= 2007–08 Texas Tech Red Raiders basketball team =

American college basketball season

2007–08 Texas Tech Red Raiders basketball
- Conference: Big 12 Conference
- Record: 16–15 (7–9 Big 12)
- Head coach: Bob Knight (7th season; first 20 games); Pat Knight (interim; final 11 games)
- Assistant coaches: Pat Knight (7th season); Chris Beard (7th season); Stew Robinson (5th season)
- Home arena: United Spirit Arena

2007–08 Big 12 men's basketball standings
	Conf.				Overall
Team	W		L	PCT	W		L	PCT
No. 7 Texas	13	–	3	.813	31	–	7	.816
No. 4 Kansas †	13	–	3	.813	37	–	3	.925
Kansas State	10	–	6	.625	21	–	12	.636
Oklahoma	9	–	7	.563	23	–	12	.657
Baylor	9	–	7	.563	21	–	11	.656
Texas A&M	8	–	8	.500	25	–	11	.694
Nebraska	7	–	9	.438	20	–	13	.606
Texas Tech	7	–	9	.438	16	–	15	.516
Oklahoma State	7	–	9	.438	17	–	16	.515
Missouri	6	–	10	.375	16	–	16	.500
Iowa State	4	–	12	.250	14	–	18	.438
Colorado	3	–	13	.188	12	–	20	.375
† 2008 Big 12 Tournament winner Rankings from AP poll

The 2007–08 Texas Tech Red Raiders basketball team represented Texas Tech University during the 2007–08 NCAA Division I men's basketball season. The Red Raiders finished 16–15 overall and 7–9 in Big 12 Conference play.

This season marked the final year that Hall of Fame coach Bob Knight led a team. He resigned with 11 games remaining to allow his son and assistant coach, Pat Knight, to lead the team prior to taking over head coaching responsibilities full-time in 2008–09. Bob Knight compiled a 12–8 record before stepping down; Pat then went 4–7 to finish out the year.
