= 2008 Big 12 men's basketball tournament =

- Classification: Division I
- Season: 2007–08
- Teams: 12
- Site: Sprint Center; Kansas City, Missouri
- Champions: Kansas (6th title)
- Winning coach: Bill Self (3rd title)
- MVP: Brandon Rush (Kansas)
- Attendance: 113,254 (overall); 19,047 (championship)
- Top scorer: D. J. Augustin (Texas) (62 points)
- Television: ESPN, ESPN2, ESPN Plus, ESPNU

2007–08 Big 12 men's basketball standings
	Conf.				Overall
Team	W		L	PCT	W		L	PCT
No. 7 Texas	13	–	3	.813	31	–	7	.816
No. 4 Kansas †	13	–	3	.813	37	–	3	.925
Kansas State	10	–	6	.625	21	–	12	.636
Oklahoma	9	–	7	.563	23	–	12	.657
Baylor	9	–	7	.563	21	–	11	.656
Texas A&M	8	–	8	.500	25	–	11	.694
Nebraska	7	–	9	.438	20	–	13	.606
Texas Tech	7	–	9	.438	16	–	15	.516
Oklahoma State	7	–	9	.438	17	–	16	.515
Missouri	6	–	10	.375	16	–	16	.500
Iowa State	4	–	12	.250	14	–	18	.438
Colorado	3	–	13	.188	12	–	20	.375
† 2008 Big 12 Tournament winner Rankings from AP poll

The 2008 Phillips 66 Big 12 men's basketball tournament was the 2008 edition of the Big 12 Conference's championship tournament held at the Sprint Center in Kansas City from March 13 until March 16, 2008. It was the 12th Big 12 tournament in the series. Texas and Kansas shared the regular season title, with Texas receiving the top seed in the tournament due to its win over Kansas earlier in the season. The top four seeds, including the two regular season champs, Oklahoma, and Kansas State automatically advanced to the quarterfinal round.

The first round featured several close games, with a combined 29-point margin of victory for the four matchups. Oklahoma State upset Texas Tech in a game that flip-flopped throughout, and the 12-seed Colorado Buffaloes defeated the 5-seed Baylor Bears in double overtime. This was both the first double-overtime game in tournament history and the first 12-seed win in tournament history. Texas A&M and Nebraska both won their games against Iowa State and Missouri, respectively.

== Regular season and tournament seeding ==
To kick off the beginning of the 2007–2008 Big 12 men's basketball season a poll of the head coaches of the Big 12 men's basketball programs found that Kansas was the preseason favorite to win the conference for a second consecutive year and receiving 10 of 12 first place votes. In second place was Texas, the 2006–2007 season's runner-up for both the regular season title and tournament title. Texas A&M was dubbed for third place and received the remaining 2 first place votes. Aggies head coach Billy Gillespie left at the end of the previous season to take up the head coaching position at Kentucky. Another important coaching change came when Bob Huggins left Kansas State after one season to return to his alma mater, West Virginia. Nonetheless, KSU was selected for fourth place in the poll, the school's highest ever selection in the conference pre-season poll. Missouri and Oklahoma tied for fifth place while Oklahoma State and Texas Tech came in seventh and eighth place, respectively. Baylor, Nebraska, Iowa State, and Colorado took the final four spots, respectively. With identical conference records of 13–3, the Texas Longhorns and the Kansas Jayhawks share the 2008 regular season title. Because Texas won the head-to-head game with Kansas, they claim the No. 1 seed for the tournament.

Standings
		Conference		Total		Post-Tournament Play	
Seed	School	W	L	W	L	NCAA/NIT	Result
1	Texas*	13	3	28	6	NCAA	Elite 8
2	Kansas*†	13	3	31	3	NCAA	National Champions
3	Kansas State	10	6	20	11	NCAA	2nd Round
4	Oklahoma	9	7	22	11	NCAA	2nd Round
5	Baylor	9	7	21	10	NCAA	1st Round
6	Texas A&M	8	8	24	10	NCAA	2nd Round
7	Nebraska	7	9	19	12	NIT	2nd Round
8	Texas Tech	7	9	16	15	See note^{1}	
9	Oklahoma State	7	9	17	15	NIT	1st Round
10	Missouri	6	10	16	16	See note^{1}	
11	Iowa State	4	12	14	18		
12	Colorado	3	13	12	20		

† – Denotes Tournament Champion. * – Denotes Regular Season Champion ^{1} – Texas Tech and Missouri were invited to the 2008 College Basketball Invitational but declined the offer.

== Schedule ==
Session	Game	Time	Matchup	Television	Attendance
First Round – Thursday, March 13
1	1	11:30 am	#9 Oklahoma State 76 vs #8 Texas Tech 72	ESPN2	18,758
1	2	2:00 pm	#12 Colorado 91 vs #5 Baylor 84 ^{2OT}	ESPNU	18,758
2	3	6:00 pm	#7 Nebraska 61 vs #10 Missouri 56	ESPN Plus	18,758
2	4	8:30 pm	#6 Texas A&M 60 vs #11 Iowa State 47	ESPNU	18,758
Quarterfinals – Friday, March 14
3	5	11:30 am	#1 Texas 66 vs #9 Oklahoma State 59	ESPNU	18,897
3	6	2:00 pm	#4 Oklahoma 54 vs #12 Colorado 49	ESPNU	18,897
4	7	6:00 pm	#2 Kansas 64 vs #7 Nebraska 54	ESPN Plus	18,897
4	8	8:30 pm	#6 Texas A&M 63 vs #3 Kansas State 60	ESPN Plus	18,897
Semifinals – Saturday, March 15
5	9	1:00 pm	#1 Texas 77 vs #4 Oklahoma 49	ESPN2	18,897
5	10	3:20 pm	#2 Kansas 77 vs #6 Texas A&M 71	ESPN2	18,897
Final – Sunday, March 16
6	11	2:00 pm	#2 Kansas 84 vs #1 Texas 74	ESPN	19,047
Game times in CT. #-Rankings denote tournament seed

== Bracket ==
First Round (March 13)
8	Texas Tech	72
9	Oklahoma State	76
5	Baylor	84^{2OT}
12	Colorado	91
7	Nebraska	61
10	Missouri	56
6	Texas A&M	60
11	Iowa State	47

Quarterfinals (March 14)
1	#6 Texas	66
9	Oklahoma State	59
4	Oklahoma	54
12	Colorado	49
2	#5 Kansas	64
7	Nebraska	54
3	Kansas State	60
6	Texas A&M	63

Semifinals (March 15)
1	#6 Texas	77
4	Oklahoma	49
2	#5 Kansas	77
6	Texas A&M	71

Championship (March 16)
1	#6 Texas	74
2	#5 Kansas	84

== Game summaries ==
=== First round ===
==== Texas Tech vs. Oklahoma State ====
Teams	1st Half	2nd Half	Final
OSU	36	40	76
TT	32	40	72

James Anderson led the Cowboys with 18 points and eight rebounds, including a crucial 12-foot jump shot with 45 seconds left to increase his team's lead to 73–70. The game was close throughout, with each team holding the lead for a good share of the game. Texas Tech's Alan Voskuil led his team in scoring with 19 points, but as Red Raider's coach Pat Knight said, "We missed eight lay-ups in the second half, missed four out of five free throws. We made a lot of dumb mistakes. It comes from being casual... It was a hard-fought game offensively and defensively. We just made too many dumb mistakes." Texas Tech had recently suffered a 109–51 loss to Kansas, which set a school record for largest loss deficit. Knight, however, said, "This is probably the most disappointed I've been because this was a game we were in." The Red Raiders briefly took the lead in the second half, but a Byron Eaton three put the Cowboys back in the lead.

==== Baylor vs. Colorado ====
Teams	1st Half	2nd Half	OT	2OT	Final
BU	31	34	9	10	84
CU	44	21	9	17	91

After gaining the lead early, Colorado managed to hold off a 2nd-half Baylor rally, taking the game into overtime twice. With the win, the Buffaloes became the first 12-seed to win a game in the tournament's eleven-year history. The game was also the first double-overtime game in tournament history. Colorado had a 15-point lead in the second half, only to see Baylor go on a 14–1 run to get back in it. With several botched possessions and failed chances to win on both sides, the game went into overtime twice. Baylor came within two during the second OT, but Kevin Rogers missed two free throws and Colorado quickly scored. A few late free throws added to the lead and gave CU the win. Baylor (21–10) had just completed one of the best seasons in the school's history, with hopes to gain an invite to the national tournament, but the loss to Colorado placed these hopes in doubt. Colorado shot 72% from the field in the first half, setting another tournament record for field goal percentage in a half.

==== Nebraska vs. Missouri ====
Teams	1st Half	2nd Half	Final
NU	30	31	61
MU	28	28	56

Aleks Maric led Nebraska with 17 points and 13 rebounds in a win over Missouri. Missouri came to within one point with under two minutes left, but series of Nebraska free throws, along with a blocked shot by Maric in the final minute, took Nebraska to the next round. Missouri (16–16) suffered this season after a Columbia fight left one of its star players with a broken jaw. They were ahead near the end of the first half, but the Cornhuskers went on a 10–3 run late and scored at the buzzer to carry the halftime lead, 28–30.

==== Texas A&M vs. Iowa State ====
Teams	1st Half	2nd Half	Final
A&M	25	35	60
ISU	17	30	47

In a physical game dominated by defensive play, Texas A&M scored their second-ever Big 12 tournament win in history. The Cyclones were held to 27% shooting from the field throughout, and their high-scorer Craig Brackins' 20 points and 12 rebounds were not enough to carry the team. The Aggies made 43% of their field goals, and were led by Donald Sloan, whose mother had died earlier that day, and Dominique Kirk with 12 points each. A&M was sitting on the bubble this year, needing some tournament wins to secure a spot in the NCAA championship tournament. With a combined 42 points in the first half, this game had the lowest scoring half in tournament history since 2003. Also, the combined margin of victory for all the tournament's first-round game was 29, the second lowest in history. The only Big 12 tournament with a lower combined margin of victory in the first round was 2006 with 28 points.

=== Quarterfinals ===
==== Oklahoma State vs. Texas ====
Teams	1st Half	2nd Half	Final
OSU	33	26	59
UT	32	34	66

A late three put the Cowboys ahead at the half, but D. J. Augustin led the Longhorns on a 14–0 run to start the second half, putting OSU far behind. Damion James held the lead in stats for Texas with 23 points and 11 rebounds. The Cowboys, with Ibrahima Thomas' 19 points, had rallied from 7 points behind to gain the lead at halftime, but went the first eight minutes of the second half without a field goal. A late rally pulled them to within three, but Texas managed to hold them off and win by seven.

==== Colorado vs. Oklahoma ====
Teams	1st Half	2nd Half	Final
CU	21	28	49
OU	26	28	54

After going scoreless for the first five minutes, Colorado fought back, holding star Sooner forward Blake Griffin to four points and keeping the game close. Other Sooners, such as Tony Crocker, Longar Longar, and Taylor Griffin, managed to make up the difference, scoring a combined 33 points in what was a largely defensive game. Both teams made only about a third of their shots from the field. Colorado's Richard Roby lead both teams in scoring with 18 points, and in rebounds with 10, and he broke a school point record with 2,001 total for his career. However, this along with Colorado's slow play, waiting the shot clock out for each possession, was not enough to keep the Sooners from advancing to meet Texas in the semifinals.

==== Kansas vs. Nebraska ====
Teams	1st Half	2nd Half	Final
KU	22	42	64
NU	27	27	54

==== Kansas State vs. Texas A&M ====
Teams	1st Half	2nd Half	Final
KSU	33	27	60
TAMU	38	25	63

Dominique Kirk hit five 3-pointers and had 19 points, and Josh Carter hit two free throws with 7 seconds left to help Texas A&M hold off third-seeded Kansas State 63–60.

Texas A&M with a (24–9) record shot 50 percent a huge improvement from its first-round game against Iowa State and didn’t let anyone besides Michael Beasley do much of anything, winning its second straight conference tournament game after going 1–11 the previous 11 years.

Beasley had 25 points and nine rebounds, but Bill Walker (10 points) was the only other double-figures scorer for Kansas State (20–11), which still got into the NCAA tournament despite the loss.

=== Semifinals ===
==== Texas vs. Oklahoma ====
Teams	1st Half	2nd Half	Final
UT	36	41	77
OU	29	20	49

==== Kansas vs. Texas A&M ====
Teams	1st Half	2nd Half	Final
KU	34	43	77
TAMU	34	37	71

=== Championship ===
==== Kansas vs. Texas ====
Teams	1st Half	2nd Half	Final
KU	45	39	84
Texas	46	28	74

== All-Tournament Team ==
Most Outstanding Player – Brandon Rush, Kansas

Player	Team	Position	Class
Brandon Rush	Kansas	Jr.	G
Mario Chalmers	Kansas	Jr.	G
A. J. Abrams	Texas	Jr.	G
D. J. Augustin	Texas	So.	G
Damion James	Texas	So.	F

== See also ==
- 2008 Big 12 Conference women's basketball tournament
- 2008 NCAA Division I men's basketball tournament
- 2007–08 NCAA Division I men's basketball rankings
