= 2007–08 Missouri Tigers men's basketball team =

American college basketball season

2007–08 Missouri Tigers men's basketball
- Conference: Big 12
- North
- Record: 16–16 (6–10 Big 12)
- Head coach: Mike Anderson
- Assistant coaches: Melvin Watkins; Matt Zimmerman; T.J. Cleveland
- Home arena: Mizzou Arena

2007–08 Big 12 men's basketball standings
	Conf.				Overall
Team	W		L	PCT	W		L	PCT
No. 7 Texas	13	–	3	.813	31	–	7	.816
No. 4 Kansas †	13	–	3	.813	37	–	3	.925
Kansas State	10	–	6	.625	21	–	12	.636
Oklahoma	9	–	7	.563	23	–	12	.657
Baylor	9	–	7	.563	21	–	11	.656
Texas A&M	8	–	8	.500	25	–	11	.694
Nebraska	7	–	9	.438	20	–	13	.606
Texas Tech	7	–	9	.438	16	–	15	.516
Oklahoma State	7	–	9	.438	17	–	16	.515
Missouri	6	–	10	.375	16	–	16	.500
Iowa State	4	–	12	.250	14	–	18	.438
Colorado	3	–	13	.188	12	–	20	.375
† 2008 Big 12 Tournament winner Rankings from AP poll

The 2007–08 Missouri Tigers men's basketball team represented the University of Missouri in the 2007-08 NCAA Division I men's basketball season. The head coach was Mike Anderson, who was in his 2nd year. The team played its home games in the Mizzou Arena in Columbia, Missouri.

== Pre-season ==
With Missouri returning four starters and eleven scholarship players from a team that surprised many by winning 18 games in head coach Mike Anderson's first year with the team, expectations were running high for the Tigers in 2007. Among the returners was the 2007 Big 12 Conference Newcomer of the Year Stefhon Hannah. In addition, the Tigers welcomed newcomer DeMarre Carroll as a transfer from Vanderbilt. Carroll was named the Big 12's Preseason Newcomer of the Year. With all of this in mind, the Big 12 coaches selected Missouri fifth in the Big 12 preseason poll.

The Tigers played two preseason games in 2007. The first was against the University of Missouri–St. Louis, winning this game 78–51. The second of their two preseason games was against Missouri Western State University. They won this game by a score of 113–55.

== Schedule ==
Date time, TV	Rank^{#}	Opponent^{#}	Result	Record	Site (attendance) city, state
Preseason
November 3, 2007; 3:06 pm		Missouri-St. Louis	W 78–51		Mizzou Arena; Columbia, MO
November 8, 2007; 7:00 pm		Missouri Western	W 113–55		Mizzou Arena; Columbia, MO
Non-Conference Regular Season
November 12, 2007*; 7:06 pm		Central Michigan; CBE Classic 1st Round	W 87–76	1–0	Mizzou Arena (5,042); Columbia, MO
November 13, 2007*; 7:06 pm		Fordham; CBE Classic 2nd Round	W 79–55	2–0	Mizzou Arena (5,076); Columbia, MO
November 16, 2007*; 7:06 pm		Southern	W 95–50	3–0	Mizzou Arena (5,287); Columbia, MO
November 19, 2007*; 8:20 pm		vs. No. 10 Michigan State; CBE Classic Semi-Finals	L 83–86	3–1	Sprint Center (18,022); Kansas City, MO
November 20, 2007*; 6:47 pm		vs. Maryland; CBE Classic Consolation Game	W 84–70	4–1	Sprint Center (16,737); Kansas City, MO
November 25, 2007*; 1:06 pm		Western Illinois	W 91–52	5–1	Mizzou Arena (4,665); Columbia, MO
November 28, 2007*; 7:05 pm		at Arkansas	L 91–94	5–2	Bud Walton Arena (18,621); Fayetteville, AR
December 1, 2007*; 8:00 pm, FSN		at California	L 72–86	5–3	Haas Pavilion (7,115); Berkeley, CA
December 8, 2007*; 3:05 pm, ESPN2		Purdue	W 73–63	6–3	Mizzou Arena (7,699); Columbia, MO
December 15, 2007*; 7:05 pm		McNeese State	W 81–44	7–3	Mizzou Arena (4,144); Columbia, MO
December 17, 2007*; 7:05 pm		North Carolina A&T	W 94–66	8–3	Mizzou Arena (5,047); Columbia, MO
December 22, 2007*; 7:30 pm, ESPN2		vs. Illinois; Busch Braggin’ Rights Game	L 58–59	8–4	Scottrade Center (21,941); St. Louis, MO
December 27, 2007*; 7:06 pm		Coppin State	W 72–38	9–4	Mizzou Arena (6,565); Columbia, MO
December 29, 2007*; 12:30 pm		at Mississippi State	L 75–87	9–5	Humphrey Coliseum (8,249); Starkville, MS
January 8, 2008*; 7:06 pm		Missouri–Kansas City	W 96–76	10–5	Mizzou Arena (5,656); Columbia, MO
Big 12 Regular Season
January 12, 2008; 12:47 pm, ESPN+		No. 12 Texas	W 97–84	11–5 (1–0)	Mizzou Arena (13,085); Columbia, MO
January 16, 2008; 7:00 pm		at Iowa State	L 67–72	11–6 (1–1)	Hilton Coliseum (12,503); Ames, IA
January 19, 2008; 7:02 pm, ESPNU		No. 3 Kansas	L 70–76	11–7 (1–2)	Mizzou Arena (15,061); Columbia, MO
January 23, 2008; 7:00 pm, ESPN+		at Texas Tech	L 84–92	11–8 (1–3)	United Spirit Arena (7,317); Lubbock, TX
January 26, 2008; 2:01 pm, ESPN+		at Colorado	W 66–62	12–8 (2–3)	Coors Events Center (5,257); Boulder, CO
January 30, 2008; 7:05 pm		Nebraska	L 62–66	12–9 (2–4)	Mizzou Arena (8,660); Columbia, MO
February 2, 2008; 12:47 pm, ESPN+		No. 22 Kansas State	W 77–74	13–9 (3–4)	Mizzou Arena (12,229); Columbia, MO
February 4, 2008; 8:05 pm, ESPN		at No. 4 Kansas	L 71–90	13–10 (3–5)	Allen Fieldhouse (16,300); Lawrence, KS
February 9, 2008; 12:47 pm, ESPN+		No. 18 Texas A&M	L 69–77	13–11 (3–6)	Mizzou Arena (12,742); Columbia, MO
February 13, 2008; 7:05 pm		at Nebraska	W 86–78	14–11 (4–6)	Bob Devaney Sports Center (10,108); Lincoln, NE
February 16, 2008; 5:05 pm, ESPN+		at No. 18 Kansas State	L 63–100	14–12 (4–7)	Bramlage Coliseum (12,528); Manhattan, KS
February 23, 2008; 7:06 pm		Colorado	W 60–53	15–12 (5–7)	Mizzou Arena (10,686); Columbia, MO
February 26, 2008; 8:05 pm, ESPNU		Oklahoma State	L 73–75	15–13 (5–8)	Mizzou Arena (7,692); Columbia, MO
March 1, 2008; 3:00 pm, ESPN+		at Baylor	L 89–100	15–14 (5–9)	Ferrell Center (8,220); Waco, TX
March 5, 2008; 7:05 pm, ESPN+		Iowa State	W 81–75	16–14 (6–9)	Mizzou Arena (7,691); Columbia, MO
March 8, 2008; 2:30 pm, ABC		at Oklahoma	L 66–75	16–15 (6–10)	Lloyd Noble Center (12,305); Norman, OK
Big 12 Tournament
March 13, 2008; 6:07 pm, ESPN	(10)	vs. (7) Nebraska; First Round	L 56–61	16–16	Sprint Center (18,758); Kansas City, MO
*Non-conference game. ^{#}Rankings from AP Poll. (#) Tournament seedings in parentheses. All times are in Central Standard Time.

== Roster ==
Name	#	Position	Height	Weight	Year	Home Town
DeMarre Carroll	1	Forward	6–8	225	JR	Birmingham, Alabama
Keon Lawrence	2	Guard	6–2	175	SO	Newark, New Jersey
Stefhon Hannah	3	Guard	6–1	175	SR	Chicago, Illinois
J.T. Tiller	4	Guard	6–3	187	SO	Marietta, Georgia
Leo Lyons	5	Forward	6–9	240	JR	Kansas City, Kansas
Nick Berardini	10	Guard	6–1	190	SR	Lake Forest, Illinois
Jason Horton	12	Guard	6–2	190	SR	Dallas, Texas
Michael Anderson Jr.	13	Guard	5–11	180	SR	Birmingham, Alabama
Marshall Brown	15	Forward	6–6	220	SR	Austin, Texas
Justin Safford	23	Forward	6–8	225	FR	Bloomington, Illinois
Vaidotas Volkus	32	Forward	6–8	220	SR	Panevėžys, Lithuania
Matt Lawrence	33	Guard	6–7	203	JR	Wildwood, Missouri
Darryl Butterfield	35	Center	6–7	225	SR	Miami, Florida

== Final Season statistics ==
Player	GP-GS	Min/G	FG%	3PT%	FT%	R/G	A/G	STL	BLK	PTS/G
**Stefhon Hannah**	20–19	28.1	.430	.385	.758	3.0	5.3	38	2	14.7
**Leo Lyons**	31–21	22.1	.583	.077	.640	5.7	1.7	22	21	13.1
**DeMarre Carroll**	32–30	25.3	.536	.176	.612	6.7	1.3	36	21	13.0
**Keon Lawrence**	32–20	29.2	.433	.349	.758	3.3	2.4	29	16	11.0
**Matt Lawrence**	32–31	26.1	.369	.348	.913	2.9	0.9	25	5	8.8
J.T. Tiller	32–12	19.7	.441	.267	.788	2.3	1.8	26	8	6.8
Marshall Brown	31–3	13.1	.409	.386	.625	1.9	0.9	14	9	4.5
Darryl Butterfield	30–1	14.2	.402	.308	.611	2.0	0.6	19	1	4.0
Jason Horton	29–13	23.0	.357	.216	.786	1.9	3.2	35	0	3.8
Justin Safford	24–0	8.9	.400	.368	.538	2.2	0.6	8	8	2.3
Vaidotas Volkus	28–10	8.0	.442	.000	.778	1.6	0.2	3	6	3.1
Nick Berardini	8–0	1.5	.600	.600	.000	0.3	0.3	1	0	1.1
Michael Anderson, Jr.	16–0	4.6	.286	.200	.000	0.1	0.4	3	0	0.3

- starters in bold (Determined as five players with most starts)

== See also ==
- 2008 NCAA Men's Division I Basketball Tournament
- 2007–08 NCAA Division I men's basketball season
- 2007–08 NCAA Division I men's basketball rankings
- List of NCAA Division I institutions
