= 2007–08 Oklahoma Sooners men's basketball team =

American college basketball season

2007–08 Oklahoma Sooners men's basketball

NCAA tournament, second round
- Conference: Big 12 Conference
- Record: 23–12 (9–7 Big 12)
- Head coach: Jeff Capel III
- Home arena: Lloyd Noble Center

2007–08 Big 12 men's basketball standings
	Conf.				Overall
Team	W		L	PCT	W		L	PCT
No. 7 Texas	13	–	3	.813	31	–	7	.816
No. 4 Kansas †	13	–	3	.813	37	–	3	.925
Kansas State	10	–	6	.625	21	–	12	.636
Oklahoma	9	–	7	.563	23	–	12	.657
Baylor	9	–	7	.563	21	–	11	.656
Texas A&M	8	–	8	.500	25	–	11	.694
Nebraska	7	–	9	.438	20	–	13	.606
Texas Tech	7	–	9	.438	16	–	15	.516
Oklahoma State	7	–	9	.438	17	–	16	.515
Missouri	6	–	10	.375	16	–	16	.500
Iowa State	4	–	12	.250	14	–	18	.438
Colorado	3	–	13	.188	12	–	20	.375
† 2008 Big 12 Tournament winner Rankings from AP poll

The 2007–08 Oklahoma Sooners men's basketball team represented the University of Oklahoma in the 2007–08 NCAA Division I men's basketball season. The head coach was Jeff Capel, who was in his second year with the team. The team played its home games in the Lloyd Noble Center in Norman, Oklahoma and was a member of the Big 12 Conference.
