= 2007–08 Iowa State Cyclones men's basketball team =

American college basketball season

2007–08 Iowa State Cyclones men's basketball
- Conference: Big 12 Conference
- Record: 14-18 (4-12 Big 12)
- Head coach: Greg McDermott (2nd season)
- Assistant coaches: T.J. Otzelberger (2nd season); Jeff Rutter; Jean Prioleau
- Home arena: Hilton Coliseum

2007–08 Big 12 men's basketball standings
	Conf.				Overall
Team	W		L	PCT	W		L	PCT
No. 7 Texas	13	–	3	.813	31	–	7	.816
No. 4 Kansas †	13	–	3	.813	37	–	3	.925
Kansas State	10	–	6	.625	21	–	12	.636
Oklahoma	9	–	7	.563	23	–	12	.657
Baylor	9	–	7	.563	21	–	11	.656
Texas A&M	8	–	8	.500	25	–	11	.694
Nebraska	7	–	9	.438	20	–	13	.606
Texas Tech	7	–	9	.438	16	–	15	.516
Oklahoma State	7	–	9	.438	17	–	16	.515
Missouri	6	–	10	.375	16	–	16	.500
Iowa State	4	–	12	.250	14	–	18	.438
Colorado	3	–	13	.188	12	–	20	.375
† 2008 Big 12 Tournament winner Rankings from AP poll

The 2007–08 Iowa State Cyclones men's basketball team represented Iowa State University during the 2007–08 NCAA Division I men's basketball season. The Cyclones were coached by Greg McDermott, who was in his second season. They played their home games at Hilton Coliseum in Ames, Iowa and competed in the Big 12 Conference.

== Previous season ==
The Cyclones finished 15–16, 6–10 in Big 12 play to finish 10th in the regular season conference standings. They lost to Oklahoma in the first round of the Big 12 tournament.

=== Offseason departures ===
Offseason departures
Name	Position	Reason for departure
Mike Taylor	Guard	Dismissed from team/2008 NBA draft
Dodie Dunson	Guard	Transferred to Vincennes JC
Corey McIntosh	Guard	Transferred to Augustana
Tyler Norman	Guard	Transferred to UNLV
Chris Ceaser	Guard	Graduated
Jessan Gray	Forward	Graduated
Jeff Bergstrom	Forward	Graduated
Dustin Streff	Forward	Graduated
Ross Marsden	Center	Retired from basketball

== Recruiting ==
College recruiting
Name	Hometown	School	Height	Weight	Commit date
Diante Garrett; PG	Milwaukee	Vincent High	6 ft 4 in (1.93 m)	170 lb (77 kg)	Aug 22, 2006
Diante Garrett; PG	Recruit ratings: Scout: Rivals: 247Sports: (80)				
Lucca Staiger; SG	Blaustein, GER	Decatur Christian	6 ft 5 in (1.96 m)	215 lb (98 kg)	Oct 18, 2006
Lucca Staiger; SG	Recruit ratings: Scout: Rivals: 247Sports: (80)				
Charles Boozer; SG	Raleigh, North Carolina	Stoneridge Prep	6 ft 3 in (1.91 m)	190 lb (86 kg)	Nov 16, 2006
Charles Boozer; SG	Recruit ratings: Scout: Rivals: 247Sports: (NR)				
Craig Brackins; PF	Palmdale, California	Brewster Academy	6 ft 10 in (2.08 m)	220 lb (100 kg)	Jun 7, 2006
Craig Brackins; PF	Recruit ratings: Scout: Rivals: 247Sports: (96)				
Overall recruit ranking: 247Sports: 50
Note: In many cases, Scout, Rivals, 247Sports, On3, and ESPN may conflict in their listings of height and weight.; In these cases, the average was taken. ESPN grades are on a 100-point scale.; Sources: "Iowa State 2007 Basketball Commitments". Rivals.; "2007 Iowa State Basketball Commits". Scout.; "ESPN". ESPN.; "Scout.com Team Recruiting Rankings". Scout.; "2007 Team Ranking". Rivals.

== Roster ==
2007–08 Iowa State Cyclones men's basketball team
Players
Coaches

Pos.	#	Name	Height	Weight	Year	Previous school	Hometown
G	0	Charles Boozer	6 ft 3 in (1.91 m)	195 lb (88 kg)	Fr	Stoneridge Prep	Raleigh, North Carolina
G	1	Cameron Lee	6 ft 2 in (1.88 m)	180 lb (82 kg)	Fr	Hillcrest	Country Club Hills, Illinois
G	2	Brock Jacobson	6 ft 2 in (1.88 m)	185 lb (84 kg)	RS So	Webster City High	Webster City, Iowa
G	3	Sean Haluska	6 ft 3 in (1.91 m)	200 lb (91 kg)	Jr	Indian Hills	Carroll, Iowa
F	4	Wesley Johnson	6 ft 7 in (2.01 m)	195 lb (88 kg)	So	Corsicana, Texas	Corsicana
G	5	Lucca Staiger (I)	6 ft 5 in (1.96 m)	220 lb (100 kg)	Fr	Decatur Christian	Blaustein, GER
G	10	Diante Garrett	6 ft 4 in (1.93 m)	180 lb (82 kg)	Fr	Vincent High	Milwaukee, Wisconsin
F	13	Rahshon Clark	6 ft 6 in (1.98 m)	190 lb (86 kg)	Sr	Bridgton Academy	Queens, New York
F	15	Alex Thompson	6 ft 10 in (2.08 m)	230 lb (104 kg)	RS Sr	Iowa	Ames, Iowa
F	21	Craig Brackins	6 ft 10 in (2.08 m)	230 lb (104 kg)	Fr	Brewster Academy	Palmdale, California
G	22	Brian Peterson	6 ft 1 in (1.85 m)	180 lb (82 kg)	Jr	Kirkwood CC	Clinton, Iowa
F	31	Cory Johnson	6 ft 7 in (2.01 m)	230 lb (104 kg)	So	Duluth East	Duluth, Minnesota
C	33	Jiri Hubalek	6 ft 11 in (2.11 m)	205 lb (93 kg)	RS Sr	Marshalltown CC	Prague
G	40	Mark Currie	6 ft 4 in (1.93 m)	205 lb (93 kg)	RS Sr	Nebraska-Omaha	Odebolt, Iowa
F	52	Mike Smith	6 ft 8 in (2.03 m)	220 lb (100 kg)	Sr	Iowa Central CC	Runnells, Iowa

Head coach

- Greg McDermott (Northern Iowa)

Assistant coach(es)

- T.J. Otzelberger (UW–Whitewater)
- Jeff Rutter (Winona State)
- Jean Prioleau (Fordham)

Legend

- (C) Team captain
- (S) Suspended
- (I) Ineligible
- (W) Walk-on
- Injured
- Current redshirt

== Schedule and results ==
Date time, TV	Rank^{#}	Opponent^{#}	Result	Record	Site city, state
Exhibition
November 1, 2007*; 7:00 pm, CloneZone		Dubuque; Exhibition	W 66-38		Hilton Coliseum; Ames, Iowa
November 4, 2007*; 6:00 pm, CloneZone		EA Sports; Exhibition	W 74-63		Hilton Coliseum; Ames, Iowa
Regular season
November 9, 2007*; 8:00 pm, Mediacom		Winston-Salem State; Cyclone Challenge	W 58-44	1-0	Hilton Coliseum; Ames, Iowa
November 10, 2007*; 8:00 pm, Mediacom		Centenary; Cyclone Challenge	W 67-57	2-0	Hilton Coliseum; Ames, Iowa
November 14, 2007*; 7:00 pm, Cyclone Television Network		at Bradley	L 56-65	2-1	Peoria Civic Center; Peoria, Illinois
November 20, 2007*; 7:00 pm, Mediacom		Minnesota	L 58-68	2-2	Hilton Coliseum; Ames, Iowa
November 27, 2007*; 7:00 pm, Mediacom		Northern Iowa	L 48-61	2-3	Hilton Coliseum; Ames, Iowa
November 30, 2007*; 10:00 pm CT, FSN		at Oregon State	W 71-64 ^{OT}	3-3	Gill Coliseum; Corvallis, OR
December 5, 2007*; 6:00 pm, DTV		at Drake	L 44-79	3-4	Knapp Center; Des Moines, Iowa
December 8, 2007*; 1:00 pm, ESPNU		Iowa; Hy-Vee Cy-Hawk Series	W 56-47	4-4	Hilton Coliseum; Ames, Iowa
December 17, 2007*; 7:00 pm, Mediacom		Bethune Cookman	W 80-57	5-4	Hilton Coliseum; Ames, Iowa
December 19, 2007*; 7:00 pm, Mediacom		Texas Southern	W 79-55	6-4	Hilton Coliseum; Ames, Iowa
December 22, 2007*; 9:30 pm CT, JumpTV Webcast		vs. Purdue; Las Vegas Classic	W 83-80	7-4	Orleans Arena; Las Vegas, Nevada
December 23, 2007*; 9:30 pm CT, JumpTV Webcast		vs. Alabama; Las Vegas Classic	L 68-83	7-5	Orleans Arena; Las Vegas, Nevada
December 30, 2007*; 7:00 pm, Mediacom		Albany	W 76-64	8-5	Hilton Coliseum; Ames, Iowa
January 2, 2008*; 7:00 pm, Cyclone Television Network		USC-Upstate	W 72-48	9-5	Hilton Coliseum; Ames, Iowa
January 5, 2008*; 7:00 pm, Cyclone Television Network		North Dakota	W 77-51	10-5	Hilton Coliseum; Ames, Iowa
January 12, 2008; 5:00 pm, ESPN Classic		at Baylor	L 67-74	10-6 (0-1)	Ferrell Center; Waco, Texas
January 16, 2008; 7:00 pm, Cyclone Television Network		Missouri	W 72-67	11-6 (1-1)	Hilton Coliseum; Ames, Iowa
January 19, 2008; 12:45 pm, ESPN Plus		Oklahoma State	W 73-66	12-6 (2-1)	Hilton Coliseum; Ames, Iowa
January 23, 2008; 6:00 pm, ESPN		at No. 2 Kansas	L 59-83	12-7 (2-2)	Allen Fieldhouse; Lawrence, Kansas
January 26, 2008; 5:00 pm, Cyclone Television Network		at Kansas State	L 57-82	12-8 (2-3)	Bramlage Coliseum; Manhattan, Kansas
January 29, 2008; 7:00 pm, Cyclone Television Network		Colorado	W 57-41	13-8 (3-3)	Hilton Coliseum; Ames, Iowa
February 2, 2008; 3:00 pm, ESPN Plus		at Nebraska	L 56-64	13-9 (3-4)	Bob Devaney Sports Center; Lincoln, Nebraska
February 5, 2008; 7:00 pm, ESPN Plus		No. 18 Texas A&M	L 51-69	13-10 (3-5)	Hilton Coliseum; Ames, Iowa
February 9, 2008; 2:30 pm, ABC		No. 12 Texas	L 64-71 ^{OT}	13-11 (3-6)	Hilton Coliseum; Ames, Iowa
February 13, 2008; 7:00 pm, ESPN Plus		at Oklahoma	L 64-76	13-12 (3-7)	Lloyd Noble Center; Norman, Oklahoma
February 16, 2008; 3:00 pm, ESPN Plus		Nebraska; ISU Basketball Centennial Celebration	W 60-52	14-12 (4-7)	Hilton Coliseum; Ames, Iowa
February 23, 2008; 12:45 pm, ESPN Plus		at Texas Tech	L 64-76	14-13 (4-8)	United Spirit Arena; Lubbock, Texas
February 27, 2008; 6:00 pm, ESPN		No. 6 Kansas	L 64-75	14-14 (4-9)	Hilton Coliseum; Ames, Iowa
March 1, 2008; 5:00 pm, ESPN Classic		at Colorado	L 55-67	14-15 (4-10)	Coors Events Center; Boulder, Colorado
March 5, 2008; 7:00 pm, ESPN Plus		at Missouri	L 75-81 ^{2OT}	14-16 (4-11)	Hearnes Center; Columbia, Missouri
March 8, 2008; 3:00 pm, ESPN Plus		Kansas State	L 69-73	14-17 (4-12)	Hilton Coliseum; Ames, Iowa
Big 12 Tournament
March 13, 2008; 8:30 pm, ESPN2		vs. Texas A&M; Big 12 Tournament First round	L 47-60	14-18 (4-12)	Kemper Arena; Kansas City, Missouri
*Non-conference game. ^{#}Rankings from AP poll. (#) Tournament seedings in parentheses. All times are in Central Time.

== Awards and honors ==
- All-Conference Selections

Jiri Hubalek (3rd Team)
Wesley Johnson (Honorable Mention)

- Ralph A. Olsen Award

Rahshon Clark (2008)
