= 2007–08 Baylor Bears basketball team =

American college basketball season

2007–08 Baylor Bears men's basketball

Paradise Jam tournament champions

NCAA Tournament, First round
- Conference: Big 12
- Record: 21–11 (9–7 Big 12)
- Head coach: Scott Drew (5th season)
- Home arena: Ferrell Center

2007–08 Big 12 men's basketball standings
	Conf.				Overall
Team	W		L	PCT	W		L	PCT
No. 7 Texas	13	–	3	.813	31	–	7	.816
No. 4 Kansas †	13	–	3	.813	37	–	3	.925
Kansas State	10	–	6	.625	21	–	12	.636
Oklahoma	9	–	7	.563	23	–	12	.657
Baylor	9	–	7	.563	21	–	11	.656
Texas A&M	8	–	8	.500	25	–	11	.694
Nebraska	7	–	9	.438	20	–	13	.606
Texas Tech	7	–	9	.438	16	–	15	.516
Oklahoma State	7	–	9	.438	17	–	16	.515
Missouri	6	–	10	.375	16	–	16	.500
Iowa State	4	–	12	.250	14	–	18	.438
Colorado	3	–	13	.188	12	–	20	.375
† 2008 Big 12 Tournament winner Rankings from AP poll

The 2007–08 Baylor Bears men's basketball team represented the Baylor University in the 2008–09 NCAA Division I men's basketball season. The team's head coach was Scott Drew, who served in his fifth year. The team played its home games at the Ferrell Center in Waco, Texas.

== Recruiting ==
College recruiting information
Name	Hometown	School	Height	Weight	Commit date
LaceDarius Dunn; SG	Monroe, LA	Excelsior Christian	6 ft 4 in (1.93 m)	190 lb (86 kg)	Jan 2, 2006
LaceDarius Dunn; SG	Recruit ratings: Scout: Rivals: (96)				
Fred Ellis; PF	Sacramento, CA	Sacramento HS	6 ft 9 in (2.06 m)	190 lb (86 kg)	Oct 15, 2006
Fred Ellis; PF	Recruit ratings: Scout: Rivals: (75)				
Delbert Simpson; C	Tyler, TX	Tyler JC	6 ft 7 in (2.01 m)	218 lb (99 kg)	Mar 14, 2007
Delbert Simpson; C	Recruit ratings: Scout: Rivals:				
Overall recruit ranking: Scout: NR Rivals: NR ESPN: NR
Note: In many cases, Scout, Rivals, 247Sports, On3, and ESPN may conflict in their listings of height and weight.; In these cases, the average was taken. ESPN grades are on a 100-point scale.; Sources: "Baylor 2007 Basketball Commitments". Rivals.; "2007 Baylor Basketball Commits". Scout.; "ESPN". ESPN.; "Scout.com Team Recruiting Rankings". Scout.; "2007 Team Ranking". Rivals.

== Roster ==
Name	#	Position	Height	Weight	Year	Home Town
Curtis Jerrells	0	Guard	6–1	205	Junior	Austin, TX
Fred Ellis	3	Forward	6–6	195	Freshman	Sacramento, CA
Henry Dugat	5	Guard	6–0	170	Junior	Dayton, TX
Delbert Simpson	11	Forward	6–8	220	Junior	Tyler, TX
Aaron Bruce	14	Guard	6–3	185	Senior	Horsham, Australia
Mamadou Diene	15	Center	7–0	250	Junior	Yeumbeul, Senegal
Richard Hurd	22	Forward	6–5	205	Senior	Houston, TX
Kevin Rogers	23	Forward	6–9	240	Junior	Dallas, TX
LaceDarius Dunn	24	Guard	6–4	200	Freshman	Monroe, LA
Mark Shepherd	40	Forward	6–9	225	Senior	Austin, TX
Tweety Carter	45	Guard	5–10	180	Sophomore	Reserve, LA
Josh Lomers	50	Center	7–0	265	Sophomore	Boerne, TX

== Schedule ==
Date time, TV	Rank^{#}	Opponent^{#}	Result	Record	Site city, state
Regular season
November 11, 2007*; 7:00 pm		Jackson State	W 100–76	1–0	Ferrell Center (5,091); Waco, TX
November 16, 2007*; 5:00 pm		vs. Wichita State; Paradise Jam tournament	W 64–55	2–0	Sports and Fitness Center; St. Thomas, U.S. Virgin Islands
November 18, 2007*; 7:30 pm, FCS		vs. Notre Dame; Paradise Jam tournament	W 68–64	3–0	Sports and Fitness Center (2,339); St. Thomas, U.S. Virgin Islands
November 19, 2007*; 7:30 pm, FCS		vs. Winthrop; Paradise Jam tournament	W 62–54	4–0	Sports and Fitness Center (3,325); St. Thomas, U.S. Virgin Islands
November 24, 2007*; 7:00 pm		Centenary	W 85–62	5–0	Ferrell Center (5,190); Waco, TX
November 30, 2007*; 8:00 pm, ESPNU		No. 6 Washington State; Big 12/Pac-10 Hardwood Series	L 64–67	5–1	Ferrell Center (10,193); Waco, TX
December 3, 2007*; 7:00 pm		Mississippi Valley State	W 82–50	6–1	Ferrell Center (5,290); Waco, TX
December 15, 2007*; 7:00 pm		Wayland Baptist	W 100–72	7–1	Ferrell Center (5,014); Waco, TX
December 19, 2007*; 6:30 pm, CSS		at South Carolina	W 92–84	8–1	Colonial Life Arena (10,880); Columbia, SC
December 21, 2007*; 7:00 pm		at Southern	W 71–60	9–1	F. G. Clark Center (750); Baton Rouge, LA
December 29, 2007*; 7:00 pm		Prairie View A&M	W 108–71	10–1	Ferrell Center (5,106); Waco, TX
December 31, 2007*; 5:00 pm		Florida A&M	W 84–61	11–1	Ferrell Center (4,616); Waco, TX
January 5, 2008*; 7:30 pm, FSNSW		vs. Arkansas	L 78–85	11–2	American Airlines Center (10,056); Dallas, TX
January 8, 2008*; 7:00 pm, FSNSW		Brown	W 72–62	12–2	Ferrell Center (4,816); Waco, TX
January 12, 2008; 5:00 pm, ESPN CL		Iowa State	W 74–67	13–2 (1–0)	Ferrell Center (7,614); Waco, TX
January 15, 2008; 7:00 pm, FSNSW		Oklahoma State	W 79–71	14–2 (2–0)	Ferrell Center (6,837); Waco, TX
January 19, 2008; 5:00 pm, ESPN+		at Nebraska	W 72–70	15–2 (3–0)	Bob Devaney Sports Center (9,408); Lincoln, NE
January 23, 2008; 7:00 pm	No. 25	at No. 18 Texas A&M	W 116–110 ^{5OT}	16–2 (4–0)	Reed Arena (12,234); College Station, TX
January 26, 2008; 3:00 pm, ESPN+	No. 25	Oklahoma	L 71–77	16–3 (4–1)	Ferrell Center (10,393); Waco, TX
February 2, 2008; 12:45 pm, ESPN+	No. 25	at No. 10 Texas	L 72–80	16–4 (4–2)	Frank Erwin Center (14,151); Austin, TX
February 6, 2008; 8:00 pm, ESPNU		Texas Tech	W 80–74	17–4 (5–2)	Ferrell Center (7,857); Waco, TX
February 9, 2008; 7:00 pm, JTV		at No. 4 Kansas	L 90–100	17–5 (5–3)	Allen Fieldhouse (16,300); Lawrence, KS
February 13, 2008; 7:00 pm		at Oklahoma State	L 83–93	17–6 (5–4)	Gallagher-Iba Arena (13,034); Stillwater, OK
February 16, 2008; 5:00 pm, ESPN		No. 11 Texas	L 77–82	17–7 (5–5)	Ferrell Center (10,521); Waco, TX
February 19, 2008; 7:00 pm, ESPN+		at Oklahoma	L 91–92 ^{OT}	17–8 (5–6)	Lloyd Noble Center (11,005); Norman, OK
February 23, 2008; 7:00 pm, FSNSW		No. 24 Kansas State	W 92–86	18–8 (6–6)	Ferrell Center (8,712); Waco, TX
February 27, 2008; 8:30 pm, FSNRM		at Colorado	W 68–57	19–8 (7–6)	Coors Events Center (3,223); Boulder, CO
March 1, 2008; 3:00 pm, ESPN+		Missouri	W 100–89	20–8 (8–6)	Ferrell Center (8,220); Waco, TX
March 5, 2008; 8:00 pm, ESPN2		Texas A&M	L 57–71	20–9 (8–7)	Ferrell Center (10,545); Waco, TX
March 8, 2008; 12:45 pm, ESPN+		at Texas Tech	W 86–73	21–9 (9–7)	United Spirit Arena (7,914); Lubbock, TX
Big 12 tournament
March 13, 2008*; 2:00 pm, ESPN+	(5)	vs. (12) Colorado; First round	L 84–91 ^{2OT}	21–10	Sprint Center; Kansas City, MO
NCAA tournament
March 20, 2008*; 1:40 pm, CBS	(11 W)	vs. (6 W) No. 20 Purdue; First round	L 79–90	21–11	Verizon Center; Washington, D.C.
*Non-conference game. ^{#}Rankings from AP Poll. (#) Tournament seedings in parentheses. All times are in Central Time.
