= 2007–08 Texas Longhorns men's basketball team =

American college basketball season

2007–08 Texas Longhorns men's basketball

Big 12 regular season co-champions

NCAA Tournament, Elite Eight
- Conference: Big 12
- South

Ranking
- Coaches: No. 5
- AP: No. 7
- Record: 31–7 (13–3 Big 12)
- Head coach: Rick Barnes
- Home arena: Frank Erwin Center

2007–08 Big 12 men's basketball standings
	Conf.				Overall
Team	W		L	PCT	W		L	PCT
No. 7 Texas	13	–	3	.813	31	–	7	.816
No. 4 Kansas †	13	–	3	.813	37	–	3	.925
Kansas State	10	–	6	.625	21	–	12	.636
Oklahoma	9	–	7	.563	23	–	12	.657
Baylor	9	–	7	.563	21	–	11	.656
Texas A&M	8	–	8	.500	25	–	11	.694
Nebraska	7	–	9	.438	20	–	13	.606
Texas Tech	7	–	9	.438	16	–	15	.516
Oklahoma State	7	–	9	.438	17	–	16	.515
Missouri	6	–	10	.375	16	–	16	.500
Iowa State	4	–	12	.250	14	–	18	.438
Colorado	3	–	13	.188	12	–	20	.375
† 2008 Big 12 Tournament winner Rankings from AP poll

The 2007–08 Texas Longhorns men's basketball team represented The University of Texas at Austin in NCAA Division I intercollegiate men's basketball competition as a member of the Big 12 Conference. The 2007–08 team shared the Big 12 championship, won a school-record 31 games, and reached the Elite Eight of the 2008 NCAA tournament.

== Roster ==
	#	Position	Height	Weight	Year	Home town
A.J. Abrams	3	Guard	5–10	155	Junior	Austin, Texas
Connor Atchley	32	Center	6–9	225	Junior	Clear Lake (Houston), Texas
D. J. Augustin	14	Guard	5-11	175	Sophomore	Sugar Land, Texas
Doğuş Balbay	2	Guard	6–0	176	Freshman	Istanbul, Turkey
Clint Chapman	53	Forward	6–10	245	Freshman	Canby, Oregon
Matt Hill	21	Forward	6–9	230	Sophomore	Lincoln, Nebraska
Damion James	5	Forward	6–7	227	Sophomore	Nacogdoches, Texas
Gary Johnson	1	Forward	6–7	247	Freshman	Houston, Texas
J.D. Lewis	4	Guard	6–1	180	Senior	Amarillo, Texas
Justin Mason	24	Guard	6–2	185	Sophomore	Amarillo, Texas
Dexter Pittman	34	Center	6–10	293	Sophomore	Rosenberg, Texas
Harrison Smith	23	Guard	6–2	185	Sophomore	Houston, Texas
Alexis Wangmene	15	Forward	6–7	241	Freshman	Blairstown, New Jersey

== Recruiting ==
College recruiting
Name	Hometown	School	Height	Weight	Commit date
Dogus Balbay; PG	Wolfeboro, New Hampshire	Brewster Academy	6 ft 1 in (1.85 m)	175 lb (79 kg)	Nov 15, 2006
Dogus Balbay; PG	Recruit ratings: Scout: Rivals: (40)				
Clint Chapman; C	Canby, Oregon	Canby HS	6 ft 9 in (2.06 m)	215 lb (98 kg)	Sep 4, 2006
Clint Chapman; C	Recruit ratings: Scout: Rivals: (96)				
Gary Johnson; PF	Houston, TX	Aldine HS	6 ft 7 in (2.01 m)	220 lb (100 kg)	Jul 3, 2006
Gary Johnson; PF	Recruit ratings: Scout: Rivals: (97)				
Alexis Wangmene; C	Blairstown, NJ	Blair Academy	6 ft 8 in (2.03 m)	235 lb (107 kg)	Sep 5, 2006
Alexis Wangmene; C	Recruit ratings: Scout: Rivals: (93)				
Overall recruit ranking: Scout: 33 Rivals: 21
Note: In many cases, Scout, Rivals, 247Sports, On3, and ESPN may conflict in their listings of height and weight.; In these cases, the average was taken. ESPN grades are on a 100-point scale.; Sources: "Texas 2007 Basketball Commitments". Rivals.; "2007 Texas Basketball Commits". Scout.; "ESPN". ESPN.; "Scout.com Team Recruiting Rankings". Scout.; "2007 Team Ranking". Rivals.

== Schedule ==
Date time, TV	Rank^{#}	Opponent^{#}	Result	Record	Site (attendance) city, state			
Exhibition games
Fri, Nov 2	7 p.m.	Xavier (La.)	#15	Frank Erwin Center • Austin, Texas		W 87–56		(1–0 exhib.)
Regular season
Mon, Nov 12	7 p.m.	Texas-San Antonio	#16	Frank Erwin Center • Austin, Texas	FSNSW (Texas)	W 58–37	10840	1–0
Fri, Nov 16	7 p.m.	UC Davis	#16	Frank Erwin Center • Austin, Texas (StubHub! Legends Classic Regional Round)		W 73–42	10792	2–0
Sun, Nov 18	5 p.m.	Arkansas-Monticello	#16	Frank Erwin Center • Austin, Texas (StubHub! Legends Classic Regional Round)		W 100–52	10483	3–0
Fri, Nov 23	6 p.m.	vs. New Mexico State	#15	Prudential Center • Newark, New Jersey (StubHub! Legends Classic Semifinals)	Versus	W 102–87		4–0
Sat, Nov 24	6 p.m.	vs. #7 Tennessee	#15	Prudential Center • Newark, New Jersey (StubHub! Legends Classic Championship Game)	FSNSW (Texas)/ Versus	W 97–78		5–0
Wed, Nov 28	7 p.m.	Texas Southern	#8	Frank Erwin Center • Austin, Texas		W 98–61	10518	6–0
Sun, Dec 2	7 p.m.	@ #2 UCLA	#8	Pauley Pavilion • Los Angeles, California (Big 12/Pac-10 Hardwood Series)	Fox Sports Net	W 63–61	12048	7–0
Wed, Dec 5	7 p.m.	North Texas	#4	Frank Erwin Center • Austin, Texas	FSNSW (Texas)	W 88–72	10913	8–0
Sat, Dec 8	7 p.m.	@ Rice	#4	Toyota Center • Houston, Texas	CSTV	W 80–54		9–0
Sat, Dec 15	5 p.m.	Texas State	#4	Frank Erwin Center • Austin, Texas	FSNSW (Texas)	W 96–81	12863	10–0
Tue, Dec 18	5:30 p.m.	Oral Roberts	#4	Frank Erwin Center • Austin, Texas	FSNSW (Texas)	W 66–56	11540	11–0
Sat, Dec 22	5:30 p.m.	vs. #9 Michigan State	#4	The Palace of Auburn Hills • Auburn Hills, Michigan (Dick’s Sporting Goods Spartan Clash)	ESPN	L 72–78		11–1
Sat, Dec 29	11 a.m.	Wisconsin	#9	Frank Erwin Center • Austin, Texas	ESPN2	L 66–67	16438	11–2
Wed, Jan 2	4 p.m.	TCU	#14	Frank Erwin Center • Austin, Texas	FSNSW (Texas)	W 67–59	12157	12–2
Sat, Jan 5	5 p.m.	St. Mary's (Calif.)	#14	Frank Erwin Center • Austin, Texas	FSNSW (Texas)	W 81–62	12525	13–2
Sat, Jan 12	12:45 p.m.	@ Missouri*	#12	Mizzou Arena • Columbia, Missouri	ESPN Plus	L 84–97		13–3 (0–1 Big 12)
Sat, Jan 19	7 p.m.	Colorado*	#19	Frank Erwin Center • Austin, Texas	ESPN Plus	W 69–67	16755	14–3 (1–1)
Mon, Jan 21	8 p.m.	@ Oklahoma State*	#12	Gallagher-Iba Arena • Stillwater, Oklahoma	ESPN	W 63–61		15–3 (2–1)
Sat, Jan 26	7 p.m.	Texas Tech*	#12	Frank Erwin Center • Austin, Texas	ESPN Plus	W 73–47	16755	16–3 (3–1)
Wed, Jan 30	8 p.m.	@ #23 Texas A&M*	#10	Reed Arena • College Station, Texas	ESPN2	L 63–80		16–4 (3–2)
Sat, Feb 2	12:45 p.m.	#25 Baylor*	#10	Frank Erwin Center • Austin, Texas	ESPN Plus	W 80–72	15458	17–4 (4–2)
Wed, Feb 6	6 p.m.	@ Oklahoma*	#12	Lloyd Noble Center • Norman, Oklahoma	ESPN2	W 64–54		18–4 (5–2)
Sat, Feb 9	2:30 p.m.	@ Iowa State*	#12	Hilton Coliseum • Ames, Iowa	ABC	W 71–65 ^{OT}		19–4 (6–2)
Mon, Feb 11	8 p.m.	#3 Kansas*	#11	Frank Erwin Center • Austin, Texas	ESPN	W 72–69	16755	20–4 (7–2)
Sat, Feb 16	5 p.m.	@ Baylor*	#11	Ferrell Center • Waco, Texas	ESPN	W 82–77		21–4 (8–2)
Mon, Feb 18	8 p.m.	#22 Texas A&M*	#7	Frank Erwin Center • Austin, Texas	ESPN	W 77–50	16755	22–4 (9–2)
Sat, Feb 23	2:30 p.m.	Oklahoma*	#7	Frank Erwin Center • Austin, Texas	ABC	W 62–45	16056	23–4 (10–2)
Mon, Feb 25	8 p.m.	@ Kansas State*	#5	Bramlage Coliseum • Manhattan, Kansas	ESPN	W 74–65		24–4 (11–2)
Sat, Mar 1	3 p.m.	@ Texas Tech*	#5	United Spirit Arena • Lubbock, Texas	CBS	L 80–83		24–5 (11–3)
Tue, Mar 4	6:30 p.m.	Nebraska*	#9	Frank Erwin Center • Austin, Texas	FSNSW (Texas)	W 70–66	14565	25–5 (12–3)
Sun, Mar 9	3 p.m.	Oklahoma State*	#9	Frank Erwin Center • Austin, Texas	ESPN	W 62–57	16505	26–5 (13–3)
2008 Big 12 Conference tournament — No. 1 Seed
Fri, Mar 14	11:30 a.m.	vs. (9) Oklahoma State*	#6	Sprint Center • Kansas City, Missouri (Big 12 Conference tournament quarterfinals)	ESPN Plus/ ESPNU	W 66–59		27–5
Sat, Mar 15	1 p.m.	vs. (4) Oklahoma*	#6	Sprint Center • Kansas City, Missouri (Big 12 Conference tournament semifinals)	ESPN Plus/ ESPN2	W 77–49		28–5
Sun, Mar 16	2 p.m.	vs. (2) #5 Kansas*	#6	Sprint Center • Kansas City, Missouri	ESPN	L 74–84		28–6
2008 NCAA tournament — No. 2 Seed
Fri, Mar 21	2 p.m.	vs. (15) Austin Peay	#7	Alltel Arena • Little Rock, Arkansas; First Round	CBS	W 74–54		29–6
Sun, Mar 23	1:15 p.m.	vs. (7) Miami (FL)	#7	Alltel Arena • Little Rock, Arkansas; Second Round	CBS	W 75–72		30–6
Fri, Mar 28	6:27 p.m.	vs. (3) #10 Stanford	#7	Reliant Stadium • Houston, Texas; Sweet Sixteen	CBS	W 82–62		31–6
Sun, Mar 30	1:20 p.m.	vs. (1) #2 Memphis	#7	Reliant Stadium • Houston, Texas; Elite Eight	CBS	L 67–85		31–7
*Big 12 Conference Game. ^{†}All times in Central Standard Time. ^{#}Rank according to Associated Press (AP) Poll. ^{OT} indicates overtime.
