= 2007–08 Kansas State Wildcats men's basketball team =

American college basketball season

2007–08 Kansas State Wildcats men's basketball

NCAA tournament, second round
- Conference: Big 12 Conference
- Record: 21–12 (10–6 Big 12)
- Head coach: Frank Martin (1st season)
- Assistant coaches: Matt Figger; Dalonte Hill; Brad Underwood
- Home arena: Fred Bramlage Coliseum (12,500)

2007–08 Big 12 men's basketball standings
	Conf.				Overall
Team	W		L	PCT	W		L	PCT
No. 7 Texas	13	–	3	.813	31	–	7	.816
No. 4 Kansas †	13	–	3	.813	37	–	3	.925
Kansas State	10	–	6	.625	21	–	12	.636
Oklahoma	9	–	7	.563	23	–	12	.657
Baylor	9	–	7	.563	21	–	11	.656
Texas A&M	8	–	8	.500	25	–	11	.694
Nebraska	7	–	9	.438	20	–	13	.606
Texas Tech	7	–	9	.438	16	–	15	.516
Oklahoma State	7	–	9	.438	17	–	16	.515
Missouri	6	–	10	.375	16	–	16	.500
Iowa State	4	–	12	.250	14	–	18	.438
Colorado	3	–	13	.188	12	–	20	.375
† 2008 Big 12 Tournament winner Rankings from AP poll

The 2007–08 Kansas State Wildcats men's basketball team represented Kansas State University in the 2007–08 college basketball season. The team was led by first-year head coach Frank Martin. The team relied on a talented crop of young players, headlined by true-freshman star Michael Beasley, the #1-ranked player in the high school class of 2007 by Rivals.com and one of the top prospects for the 2008 NBA draft.

The young team concluded the season 21–12 (10–6) and reached the second round of the NCAA tournament.

== Players ==
=== Roster ===
#	Name	Height	Weight (lbs.)	Position	Class	Hometown	Previous Team(s)
	Denis Clemente^{1}	6'	180	G	Jr.	Bayamón, Puerto Rico	Calusa Prep HS (Miami, FL); University of Miami
0	Jacob Pullen	6'1"	185	G	Fr.	Maywood, IL, U.S.	Proviso East HS
1	Fred Brown	6'3"	185	G	Fr.	West Palm Beach, FL, U.S.	Dwyer HS
2	Blake Young	6'2"	195	G	Sr.	Orlando, FL, U.S.	Oak Ridge HS; Daytona Beach CC
4	Andre Gilbert	6'7"	205	F	Jr.	Brooklyn Park, MN, U.S.	Park Center HS; South Dakota State University; Mt. San Jacinto CC
5	Clent Stewart	6'4"	195	G	Sr.	Tulsa, OK, U.S.	Union HS
12	Bill Walker^{2}	6'6"	220	F	Fr.	Huntington, WV, U.S.	North College Hill HS (North College Hill, OH)
15	David Hoskins^{3}	6'5"	230	F	Sr.	Canton, MI, U.S.	Salem HS; Central Michigan University; Schoolcraft CC
21	Jamar Samuels^{4}	6'8"	200	F	Fr.	Washington, DC, U.S.	Patterson HS (Lenoir, NC)
23	Dominique Sutton^{4}	6'5"	205	G	Fr.	Durham, NC, U.S.	Patterson HS (Lenoir, NC)
30	Michael Beasley	6'10"	235	F	Fr.	Frederick, MD, U.S.	Notre Dame Prep HS (Fitchburg, MA)
31	Chris Merriewether	6'4"	195	G	So.	Jacksonville, FL, U.S.	Arlington Country Day HS
40	Ron Anderson	6'8"	245	F	Fr.	Upper Marlboro, MD, U.S.	McCallie HS (Chattanooga, TN)
42	Darren Kent	6'10"	210	F	Jr.	Apple Valley, MN, U.S.	Eastview HS
50	Luis Colon	6'10"	275	C	So.	Bayamón, Puerto Rico	Krop HS (Miami, FL)
51	James Franklin	6'	190	G	Sr.	Kansas City, KS, U.S.	Blue Valley West HS; Cowley County CC

^{1}Transfer, ineligible for 2007–08 season.
^{2}Enrolled early to join team for Spring 2007 semester, but was injured and opted to begin freshman season in 2007–08.
^{3}Will miss all of 2007–08 season with knee injury; intends to appeal to NCAA for sixth year to complete eligibility.
^{4}Did not meet academic eligibility requirements to enroll for Fall 2007 semester; will complete academic coursework and join team for Spring 2008 semester.

=== Incoming signees ===
2007 saw the Wildcats put together one of the nation's strongest signing classes, ranked 1st according to Scout.com, 2nd according to Rivals.com, and 5th according to ESPN.com. PF Beasley (Washington, D.C.) was the standout of the class but was far from being its only talented member. The Wildcats signed two talented PGs in Fred Brown (West Palm Beach, Florida) and Jacob Pullen (Maywood, Illinois) and added SF Andre Gilbert (Brooklyn Park, Minnesota), a JUCO transfer with Division I experience. KSU signed a pair of talented players from the Patterson School in North Carolina in SF Dominique Sutton (Durham, North Carolina) and PF Jamar Samuels (Washington, D.C.). Both attended prep school for the Fall 2007 semester to improve their grades to join the team at the start of the Spring 2008 semester.

Though scheduled to graduate from high school in the Spring of 2007, SF Bill Walker (Huntington, West Virginia) finished high school early and enrolled at KSU for the 2007 Spring Semester and was allowed to join the team immediately in December of the 2006–07 season. However, he was injured in just his sixth game at KSU and opted to redshirt for the remainder of the season. He will resume his freshman season of eligibility in 2007–08. PF Ron Anderson (Upper Marlboro, Maryland), a long time AAU teammate of Beasley's, rounded out the class when he was offered a scholarship after a strong AAU showing in the Summer of 2007.

College recruiting
Name	Hometown	School	Height	Weight	Commit date
Ron Anderson; PF	Upper Marlboro, Maryland	Chattanooga (TN)-McCallie School	6 ft 7 in (2.01 m)	245 lb (111 kg)	Aug 13, 2007
Ron Anderson; PF	Recruit ratings: Scout: Rivals: (71)				
Michael Beasley; PF	Washington, D.C.	Fitchburg (MA)-Notre Dame Prep	6 ft 9 in (2.06 m)	235 lb (107 kg)	Jun 23, 2006
Michael Beasley; PF	Recruit ratings: Scout: Rivals: (92)				
Fred Brown; SG	West Palm Beach, Florida	Dwyer HS	6 ft 3 in (1.91 m)	180 lb (82 kg)	Sep 26, 2006
Fred Brown; SG	Recruit ratings: Scout: Rivals: (76)				
Andre Gilbert; SF	Brooklyn Park, Minnesota	Park Center HS, South Dakota State, Mt. San Jacinto CC	6 ft 7 in (2.01 m)	205 lb (93 kg)	May 9, 2007
Andre Gilbert; SF	Recruit ratings: Scout: Rivals: (N/A)				
Jacob Pullen; PG	Maywood, Illinois	Proviso East HS	6 ft 1 in (1.85 m)	175 lb (79 kg)	Sep 23, 2006
Jacob Pullen; PG	Recruit ratings: Scout: Rivals: (87)				
Jamar Samuels; PF	Washington, D.C.	Lenoir (NC)-Patterson School	6 ft 8 in (2.03 m)	200 lb (91 kg)	May 9, 2007
Jamar Samuels; PF	Recruit ratings: Scout: Rivals: (NA)				
Dominique Sutton; SF	Durham, North Carolina	Lenoir (NC)-Patterson School	6 ft 4 in (1.93 m)	190 lb (86 kg)	Oct 25, 2006
Dominique Sutton; SF	Recruit ratings: Scout: Rivals: (85)				
Bill Walker; SF	Huntington, West Virginia	North College Hill (OH) HS	6 ft 6 in (1.98 m)	210 lb (95 kg)	Oct 18, 2006
Bill Walker; SF	Recruit ratings: Scout: Rivals: (NA)				
Overall recruit ranking: Scout: 1 Rivals: 2 ESPN: 5
Note: In many cases, Scout, Rivals, 247Sports, On3, and ESPN may conflict in their listings of height and weight.; In these cases, the average was taken. ESPN grades are on a 100-point scale.; Sources: "2007 Kansas St. Basketball Commitment List". Rivals.; "Kansas State College Basketball Recruiting Commits". Scout.; "Scout.com Team Recruiting Rankings". Scout.; "2007 Team Ranking". Rivals.

== Schedule ==
Date time, TV	Rank^{#}	Opponent^{#}	Result	Record	Site (attendance) city, state
Exhibition
November 3*; 5:00 pm		Fort Hays State	W 95–59	0–0	Bramlage Coliseum (10,474); Manhattan, KS
Regular season
November 9*; 7:00 pm, FSN Midwest	No. 25	Sacramento State	W 94–63	1–0	Bramlage Coliseum (10,178); Manhattan, KS
November 11*; 3:00 pm, FSN Midwest	No. 25	Pittsburg State	W 76–66	2–0	Bramlage Coliseum (8,373); Manhattan, KS
November 17*; 6:00 pm	No. 22	Western Illinois	W 77–64	3–0	Bramlage Coliseum (12,528); Manhattan, KS
2007 Old Spice Classic
November 22*; 8:30 pm, ESPN2	No. 18	vs. George Mason	L 77–87	3–1	The Milk House (3,163); Lake Buena Vista, FL
November 23*; 6:30 pm, ESPNU	No. 18	vs. Central Florida	W 73–71 ^{OT}	4–1	The Milk House (2,903); Lake Buena Vista, FL
November 25*; 12:00 pm, ESPNU	No. 18	vs. Rider	W 82–69	5–1	The Milk House (783); Lake Buena Vista, FL
Big 12/Pac-10 Hardwood Series
November 29*; 8:00 pm, ESPN2	No. 25	No. 17 Oregon	L 77–80	5–2	Bramlage Coliseum (12,528); Manhattan, KS
13th Annual Jimmy V Classic
December 4*; 6:00 pm, ESPN		vs. Notre Dame	L 59–68	5–3	Madison Square Garden (8,300); Manhattan, NY
December 9*; 1:00 pm, FSN Midwest		California	W 82–75	6–3	Bramlage Coliseum (5,274); Manhattan, KS
K-State Holiday Classic presented by Subway
December 17*; 7:00 pm, FSN Midwest		vs. Florida A&M	W 87–60	7–3	Sprint Center (17,699); Kansas City, MO
December 22*; 7:00 pm, FSN Midwest		Winston-Salem State	W 90–48	8–3	Bramlage Coliseum (4,495); Manhattan, KS
December 29*; 1:00 pm, FSN Midwest		Wagner	W 101–59	9–3	Bramlage Coliseum (10,114); Manhattan, KS
December 31*; 6:00 pm, ESPNU		vs. Xavier	L 77–103	9–4	U.S. Bank Arena (5,233); Cincinnati, OH
January 7*; 7:00 pm, FSN Midwest		Savannah State	W 85–25	10–4	Bramlage Coliseum (5,476); Manhattan, KS
Big 12 Regular season
January 12; 5:00 pm, ESPN Plus		at Oklahoma	W 84–82	11–4 (1–0)	Noble Center (11,858); Norman, OK
January 19; 3:00 pm, ESPN		No. 10 Texas A&M	W 75–54	12–4 (2–0)	Bramlage Coliseum (12,528); Manhattan, KS
January 23; 8:00 pm, ESPNU		at Colorado	W 72–56	13–4 (3–0)	Coors Events Center (6,992); Boulder, CO
January 26; 5:00 pm, FSN Midwest		Iowa State	W 82–57	14–4 (4–0)	Bramlage Coliseum (12,528); Manhattan, KS
January 30; 7:00 pm, ESPN Plus	No. 22	No. 2 Kansas	W 84–75	15–4 (5–0)	Bramlage Coliseum (12,528); Manhattan, KS
February 2; 12:30 pm, ESPN Plus	No. 22	at Missouri	L 74–77	15–5 (5–1)	Mizzou Arena (12,229); Columbia, MO
February 6; 7:00 pm, FSN Midwest	No. 20	Nebraska	W 74–59	16–5 (6–1)	Bramlage Coliseum (12,393); Manhattan, KS
February 9; 5:00 pm, ESPN	No. 20	Oklahoma State	W 82–61	17–5 (7–1)	Bramlage Coliseum (12,528); Manhattan, KS
February 13; 8:00 pm, ESPN2	No. 18	at Texas Tech	L 75–84	17–6 (7–2)	United Spirit Arena (7,742); Lubbock, TX
February 16; 5:00 pm, ESPN Plus	No. 18	Missouri	W 100–63	18–6 (8–2)	Bramlage Coliseum (12,528); Manhattan, KS
February 20; 8:00 pm, ESPN2	No. 24	at Nebraska	L 64–71	18–7 (8–3)	Devaney Sports Center (9,725); Lincoln, NE
February 23; 7:00 pm, FSN Midwest	No. 24	at Baylor	L 86–92	18–8 (8–4)	Ferrell Center (8,712); Waco, TX
February 25; 8:00 pm, ESPN		No. 5 Texas	L 65–74	18–9 (8–5)	Bramlage Coliseum (12,528); Manhattan, KS
March 1; 8:00 pm, ESPN		at No. 6 Kansas; ESPN College GameDay	L 74–88	18–10 (8–6)	Allen Fieldhouse (16,300); Lawrence, KS
March 4; 8:00 pm, ESPN Plus		Colorado	W 78–72	19–10 (9–6)	Bramlage Coliseum (12,528); Manhattan, KS
March 8; 3:00 pm, ESPN Plus		at Iowa State	W 73–69	20–10 (10–6)	Hilton Coliseum (14,134); Ames, IA
Phillips 66 2008 Big 12 Championship tournament
March 14; 9:20 pm, ESPN Plus		vs. Texas A&M	L 60–63	20–11	Sprint Center (18,897); Kansas City, MO
2008 NCAA tournament
March 20*; 6:10 pm, CBS		vs. USC; First round	W 80–67	21–11	Qwest Center (17,162); Omaha, NE
March 22*; 3:20 pm, CBS		vs. No. 6 Wisconsin; Second round	L 55–72	21–12	Qwest Center (–); Omaha, NE
*Non-conference game. ^{#}Rankings from AP Poll. (#) Tournament seedings in parentheses. All times are in Central Time.

== Post-season ==
=== Big 12 tournament ===
The Wildcats went on to a 10–6 record in conference play, earning a number 3 seed in the 2008 Big 12 men's basketball tournament at the Sprint Center in Kansas City, Missouri. The Wildcats faced the No. 6 seed Texas A&M Aggies and lost 60–63.

=== NCAA tournament ===
==== First round ====
The Wildcats earned a berth in the 2008 NCAA tournament as the No. 11 seed in the Midwest Region. In the first round they beat the No. 6 seed USC Trojans, 80–67. The victory over the Trojans was the Wildcats' first win in a tournament game since beating No. 1 seed Purdue, 73–70, in the Midwest Regional semifinals on March 25, 1988.

==== Second round ====
The Wildcats faced the Wisconsin Badgers from the Big Ten Conference in the second round and were soundly defeated, 55–72.

Michael Beasley scored 23 points and grabbed 13 rebounds for his 28th double-double of the season, but he had only six after halftime.

== Statistics ==
=== Season Box Score ===
- As of 3/9/08

#	Player	GP	GS	Min	Avg	FGA	FGM	FG Pct	3FGA	3FGM	3FG Pct	FTA	FTM	FT Pct	Off Reb	Def Reb	Total Reb	Avg	PF	FO	Asst	TO	Blk	Stl	Pts	Avg
30	Beasley	30	30	940	31.3	525	282	.537	86	34	.395	256	197	.770	126	249	375	12.5	76	1	36	88	50	40	795	26.5
12	Walker	28	25	752	26.9	353	162	.459	102	32	.314	128	92	.719	73	108	181	6.5	90	2	51	74	17	27	448	16.0
0	Pullen	30	14	706	23.5	245	100	.408	124	40	.323	87	62	.713	8	36	44	1.5	49	1	99	66	1	38	302	10.1
5	Stewart	27	19	783	29.0	176	60	.341	93	28	.301	57	41	.719	32	49	81	3.0	48	1	87	61	3	25	189	7.0
2	Young	30	30	859	28.6	174	62	.356	81	26	.321	56	35	.625	40	61	101	3.4	86	7	59	42	1	29	185	6.2
4	Gilbert	24	15	448	18.7	97	37	.381	38	11	.289	27	18	.667	24	41	65	2.7	49	1	41	36	3	13	103	4.3
1	Brown	24	0	224	9.3	94	36	.383	51	19	.373	16	8	.500	11	21	32	1.3	18	0	18	13	3	10	99	4.1
23	Sutton	16	5	222	13.9	41	22	.537	5	0	.000	18	10	.556	23	20	43	2.7	29	0	10	11	4	19	54	3.4
40	Anderson	27	6	323	12.0	64	34	.531	0	0	.000	36	18	.500	52	46	98	3.6	35	0	14	13	6	9	86	3.2
42	Kent	27	0	372	13.8	67	26	.388	25	7	.280	16	8	.500	24	42	66	2.4	62	1	33	30	8	11	67	2.5
50	Colon	25	2	150	6.0	33	12	.364	0	0	.000	16	6	.375	12	17	29	1.2	36	0	6	13	7	1	30	1.2
51	Franklin	11	1	46	4.2	10	3	.300	4	1	.250	2	0	.000	3	5	8	0.7	7	0	7	3	0	4	7	0.6
31	Merriewether	25	3	225	9.0	17	5	.294	6	0	.000	9	4	.444	11	12	23	0.9	23	0	19	15	5	6	14	0.6

Player	GP	GS	Min	Avg	FGA	FGM	FG Pct	3FGA	3FGM	3FG Pct	FTA	FTM	FT Pct	Off Reb	Def Reb	Total Reb	Avg	PF	FO	Asst	TO	Blk	Stl	Pts	Avg
Opponents	30		6050		1730	726	.420	541	198	.366	643	422	.656	338	664	1002	33.4	620		415	502	107	223	2072	69.1
TEAM	30		6050		1896	841	.444	615	198	.322	724	499	.689	495	756	1251	41.7	608	14	480	468	108	232	2379	79.3
