= 2007–08 Kansas Jayhawks men's basketball team =

American college basketball season

2007–08 Kansas Jayhawks men's basketball

NCAA tournament National Champions Big 12 tournament champions Big 12 regular season co-champions

National Championship Game, W 75–68 ^{OT} vs. Memphis
- Conference: Big 12 Conference

Ranking
- Coaches: No. 1
- AP: No. 4
- Record: 37–3 (13–3 Big 12)
- Head coach: Bill Self (5th Season)
- Assistant coaches: Joe Dooley (5th season); Danny Manning (1st season); Kurtis Townsend (4th season)
- Captains: Jeremy Case; Darnell Jackson; Sasha Kaun; Russell Robinson; Rodrick Stewart
- Home arena: Allen Fieldhouse

2007–08 Big 12 men's basketball standings
	Conf.				Overall
Team	W		L	PCT	W		L	PCT
No. 7 Texas	13	–	3	.813	31	–	7	.816
No. 4 Kansas †	13	–	3	.813	37	–	3	.925
Kansas State	10	–	6	.625	21	–	12	.636
Oklahoma	9	–	7	.563	23	–	12	.657
Baylor	9	–	7	.563	21	–	11	.656
Texas A&M	8	–	8	.500	25	–	11	.694
Nebraska	7	–	9	.438	20	–	13	.606
Texas Tech	7	–	9	.438	16	–	15	.516
Oklahoma State	7	–	9	.438	17	–	16	.515
Missouri	6	–	10	.375	16	–	16	.500
Iowa State	4	–	12	.250	14	–	18	.438
Colorado	3	–	13	.188	12	–	20	.375
† 2008 Big 12 Tournament winner Rankings from AP poll

The 2007–08 Kansas Jayhawks men's basketball team represented the University of Kansas for the NCAA Division I men's intercollegiate basketball season of 2007–08, which was the Jayhawks' 110th Season. The team was led by Bill Self in his 5th season as head coach. The team played its home games in Allen Fieldhouse in Lawrence, Kansas.

The Jayhawks finished the season 37–3, 13–3 in Big 12 play to finish tied for first place. They defeated Nebraska, Texas Tech, and Texas A&M to win the Big 12 tournament championship. As a result, they received the conference's automatic bid to the NCAA tournament as the No. 1 seed in the Midwest region. They defeated Memphis in the National Championship game, marking the third NCAA tournament title in the school's history.

The Jayhawks 37 wins remains a program record. Additionally, the win total is tied for 3rd most in NCAA history (Kentucky twice won 38 and Memphis also won 38, but the wins were officially vacated).

== Recruiting ==
College recruiting information
Name	Hometown	School	Height	Weight	Commit date
Chase Buford; SG	San Antonio, TX	Alamo Heights HS	6 ft 3 in (1.91 m)	185 lb (84 kg)	N/A
Chase Buford; SG	Recruit ratings: Scout: Rivals: (71)				
Cole Aldrich; C	Bloomington, MN	Jefferson HS	6 ft 10 in (2.08 m)	245 lb (111 kg)	Nov 1, 2005
Cole Aldrich; C	Recruit ratings: Scout: Rivals: (97)				
Tyrel Reed; PG	Burlington, KS	Burlington HS	6 ft 4 in (1.93 m)	180 lb (82 kg)	Nov 15, 2006
Tyrel Reed; PG	Recruit ratings: Scout: Rivals: (93)				
Conner Teahan; SF	Leawood, KS	Rockhurst HS (Kansas City, MO)	6 ft 5 in (1.96 m)	180 lb (82 kg)	Feb 26, 2007
Conner Teahan; SF	Recruit ratings: Scout: Rivals: (NR)				
Overall recruit ranking: Scout: 34 Rivals: NR ESPN: NR
Note: In many cases, Scout, Rivals, 247Sports, On3, and ESPN may conflict in their listings of height and weight.; In these cases, the average was taken. ESPN grades are on a 100-point scale.; Sources: "Kansas 2007 Basketball Commitments". Rivals.; "2007 Kansas Basketball Commits". Scout.; "ESPN". ESPN.; "Scout.com Team Recruiting Rankings". Scout.; "2007 Team Ranking". Rivals.

== Roster ==
2007–08 Kansas Jayhawks men's basketball team
Players
Coaches

Pos.	#	Name	Height	Weight	Year	Hometown
C	45	Cole Aldrich	6 ft 11 in (2.11 m)	240 lb (109 kg)	Fr	Bloomington, MN
F	00	Darrell Arthur	6 ft 9 in (2.06 m)	225 lb (102 kg)	So	Dallas, TX
G	11	Brennan Bechard	6 ft 0 in (1.83 m)	185 lb (84 kg)	Jr	Lawrence, KS
G	22	Chase Buford	6 ft 3 in (1.91 m)	200 lb (91 kg)	Fr	San Antonio, TX
G	10	Jeremy Case	6 ft 1 in (1.85 m)	190 lb (86 kg)	Sr	McAlester, OK
G	15	Mario Chalmers	6 ft 1 in (1.85 m)	190 lb (86 kg)	Jr	Anchorage, AK
G	4	Sherron Collins	5 ft 11 in (1.8 m)	205 lb (93 kg)	So	Chicago, IL
F	32	Darnell Jackson	6 ft 8 in (2.03 m)	250 lb (113 kg)	Sr	Oklahoma City, OK
C	24	Sasha Kaun	6 ft 11 in (2.11 m)	250 lb (113 kg)	Sr	Tomsk, Russia
C	54	Matt Kleinmann	6 ft 10 in (2.08 m)	250 lb (113 kg)	Jr	Overland Park, KS
G	12	Brady Morningstar	6 ft 3 in (1.91 m)	187 lb (85 kg)	So	Lawrence, KS
G	14	Tyrel Reed	6 ft 3 in (1.91 m)	185 lb (84 kg)	Fr	Burlington, KS
G	3	Russell Robinson	6 ft 1 in (1.85 m)	205 lb (93 kg)	Sr	New York, NY
G	25	Brandon Rush	6 ft 6 in (1.98 m)	210 lb (95 kg)	Jr	Kansas City, MO
G	5	Rodrick Stewart	6 ft 4 in (1.93 m)	200 lb (91 kg)	Sr	Seattle, WA
G	2	Conner Teahan	6 ft 5 in (1.96 m)	205 lb (93 kg)	Fr	Leawood, KS
G	40	Brad Witherspoon	6 ft 1 in (1.85 m)	190 lb (86 kg)	Sr	Humboldt, KS

Head coach

- Bill Self

Assistant coach(es)

Legend

- (C) Team captain
- (S) Suspended
- (I) Ineligible
- (W) Walk-on
- Injured
- Current redshirt

== Schedule ==
Date time, TV	Rank^{#}	Opponent^{#}	Result	Record	Site (attendance) city, state
Exhibition
November 1, 2007*; 7:00 p.m., J-TV	No. 4	Pittsburg State	W 94–59		Allen Fieldhouse; Lawrence, Kansas
November 6, 2007*; 7:00 p.m., J-TV	No. 4	Fort Hays State	W 93–56		Allen Fieldhouse; Lawrence, Kansas
Regular season
November 9, 2007*; 7:00 p.m., J-TV	No. 4	Louisiana-Monroe	W 107–78	1–0	Allen Fieldhouse (16,300); Lawrence, Kansas
November 11, 2007*; 7:00 p.m., J-TV	No. 4	UMKC; Jayhawk Invitational	W 85–62	2–0	Allen Fieldhouse (16,300); Lawrence, Kansas
November 15, 2007*; 7:00 p.m., J-TV	No. 4	Washburn; Jayhawk Invitational	W 92–60	3–0	Allen Fieldhouse (16,300); Lawrence, Kansas
November 21, 2007*; 7:00 p.m., J-TV	No. 4	Northern Arizona; Jayhawk Invitational	W 87–46	4–0	Allen Fieldhouse (16,300); Lawrence, Kansas
November 25, 2007*; 7:00 p.m., ESPN	No. 4	Arizona; Jayhawk Invitational/ Big XII–Pac-10 Hardwood Series	W 76–72 ^{OT}	5–0	Allen Fieldhouse (16,300); Lawrence, Kansas
November 28, 2007*; 7:00 p.m., J-TV	No. 4	Florida Atlantic	W 87–49	6–0	Allen Fieldhouse (16,300); Lawrence, Kansas
December 2, 2007*; 1:00 p.m., FSN	No. 4	at No. 24 USC	W 59–55	7–0	Galen Center (10,017); Los Angeles, California
December 5, 2007*; 7:00 p.m., J-TV	No. 3	Eastern Washington	W 85–47	8–0	Allen Fieldhouse (16,300); Lawrence, Kansas
December 8, 2007*; 1:00 p.m., ESPN	No. 3	DePaul	W 84–66	9–0	Allen Fieldhouse (16,300); Lawrence, Kansas
December 15, 2007*; 4:00 p.m., ESPN2	No. 3	vs. Ohio; American Century Investments Shootout	W 88–51	10–0	Sprint Center (18,482); Kansas City, Missouri
December 18, 2007*; 6:00 p.m., ESPN	No. 3	at Georgia Tech	W 71–66	11–0	Alexander Memorial Coliseum (9,191); Atlanta, Georgia
December 22, 2007*; 12:00 p.m., J-TV	No. 3	Miami (OH)	W 78–54	12–0	Allen Fieldhouse (16,300); Lawrence, Kansas
December 29, 2007*; 7:00 p.m., J-TV	No. 3	Yale	W 86–53	13–0	Allen Fieldhouse (16,300); Lawrence, Kansas
January 1, 2008*; 11:00 a.m., ESPN	No. 3	at Boston College	W 85–60	14–0	Conte Forum (8,606); Chestnut Hill, Massachusetts
January 8, 2008*; 7:00 p.m., J-TV	No. 3	Loyola (MD)	W 90–60	15–0	Allen Fieldhouse (16,300); Lawrence, Kansas
January 12, 2008; 8:00 p.m., ESPN	No. 3	at Nebraska	W 79–58	16–0	Bob Devaney Sports Center (13,829); Lincoln, Nebraska
January 14, 2008; 7:00 p.m., ESPN	No. 3	Oklahoma	W 85–55	17–0	Allen Fieldhouse (16,300); Lawrence, Kansas
January 19, 2008; 7:00 p.m., ESPNU	No. 3	at Missouri	W 76–70	18–0	Mizzou Arena (15,061); Columbia, Missouri
January 23, 2008; 6:00 p.m., ESPN	No. 2	Iowa State	W 83–59	19–0	Allen Fieldhouse (16,300); Lawrence, Kansas
January 26, 2008; 12:45 p.m., BIG 12-ESPN+	No. 2	Nebraska	W 84–49	20–0	Allen Fieldhouse (16,300); Lawrence, Kansas
January 30, 2008; 7:00 p.m., BIG 12-ESPN+	No. 2	at No. 24 Kansas State	L 75–84	20–1	Bramlage Coliseum (12,528); Manhattan, Kansas
February 2, 2008; 2:30 p.m., ABC	No. 2	at Colorado	W 72–59	21–1	Coors Events Center (10,347); Boulder, Colorado
February 4, 2008; 8:00 p.m., ESPN	No. 5	Missouri	W 90–71	22–1	Allen Fieldhouse (16,300); Lawrence, Kansas
February 9, 2008; 7:00 p.m., J-TV	No. 5	Baylor	W 100–90	23–1	Allen Fieldhouse (16,300); Lawrence, Kansas
February 11, 2008; 8:00 p.m., ESPN	No. 3	at No. 11 Texas	L 69–72	23–2	Frank Erwin Center (16,755); Austin, Texas
February 16, 2008; 12:45 p.m., BIG 12-ESPN+	No. 3	Colorado	W 69–45	24–2	Allen Fieldhouse (16,300); Lawrence, Kansas
February 23, 2008; 3:00 p.m., CBS	No. 5	at Oklahoma State	L 60–61	24–3	Gallagher-Iba Arena (13,905); Stillwater, Oklahoma
February 27, 2008; 6:00 p.m., ESPN	No. 7	at Iowa State	W 75–64	25–3	Hilton Coliseum (13,624); Ames, Iowa
March 1, 2008; 8:00 p.m., ESPN	No. 7	Kansas State; ESPN College GameDay	W 88–74	26–3	Allen Fieldhouse (16,300); Lawrence, Kansas
March 3, 2008; 8:00 p.m., ESPN	No. 6	Texas Tech	W 109–51	27–3	Allen Fieldhouse (16,300); Lawrence, Kansas
March 8, 2008; 3:00 p.m., CBS	No. 6	at Texas A&M	W 72–55	28–3	Reed Arena (12,054); College Station, Texas
Big 12 Tournament
March 14, 2008; 6:00 p.m., BIG 12-ESPN+	No. 5	vs. Nebraska; Quarterfinals	W 64–54	29–3	Sprint Center (18,897); Kansas City, Missouri
March 15, 2008; 3:20 p.m., BIG 12-ESPN+	No. 5	vs. Texas A&M; Semifinals	W 77–71	30–3	Sprint Center (18,897); Kansas City, Missouri
March 16, 2008; 2:00 p.m., ESPN	No. 5	vs. No. 6 Texas; Championship	W 84–74	31–3	Sprint Center (19,047); Kansas City, Missouri
NCAA Tournament
March 20, 2008; 11:25 a.m., CBS	No. 4 (1)	vs. (16) Portland State; First round	W 85–61	32–3	Qwest Center Omaha (17,839); Omaha, Nebraska
March 22, 2008; 5:50 p.m., CBS	No. 4 (1)	vs. (8) UNLV; Second round	W 75–56	33–3	Qwest Center Omaha (17,162); Omaha, Nebraska
March 28, 2008; 8:50 p.m., CBS	No. 4 (1)	vs. (12) Villanova; Sweet Sixteen	W 72–57	34–3	Ford Field (57,028); Detroit, Michigan
March 30, 2008; 4:05 p.m., CBS	No. 4 (1)	vs. No. 23 (10) Davidson; Elite Eight	W 59–57	35–3	Ford Field (57,563); Detroit, Michigan
April 5, 2008; 8:47 p.m., CBS	No. 4 (1)	vs. No. 1 (1) North Carolina; Final Four	W 84–66	36–3	Alamodome (43,718); San Antonio, Texas
April 7, 2008; 8:21 p.m., CBS	No. 4 (1)	vs. No. 2 (1) Memphis; National Championship game	W 75–68 ^{OT}	37–3	Alamodome (43,257); San Antonio, Texas
*Non-conference game. ^{#}Rankings from AP poll, NCAA tournament seeds shown in parentheses. (#) Tournament seedings in parentheses. All times are in Central Standard Time.

== Rankings ==
Poll	Pre	Wk 1	Wk 2	Wk 3	Wk 4	Wk 5	Wk 6	Wk 7	Wk 8	Wk 9	Wk 10	Wk 11	Wk 12	Wk 13	Wk 14	Wk 15	Wk 16	Wk 17	Wk 18	Wk 19	Final
AP	4	4	4	4	3	3	3	3	3	3	3	2	2	4	3	4	6	5	4	4	–
Coaches	4	4	4	4	3	3	3	3	3	3	3	2	2	5	3	5	7	6	5	4	1

== Awards ==
Big 12 Sixth Man Award
Sherron Collins (Sophomore, Guard)
Phillips 66 Big 12 Player of the Week
Darnell Jackson (Senior, Forward), January 7 (co-winner)
Brandon Rush (Junior, Guard), March 3 (co-winner)
Sherron Collins, March 9 (co-winner)
All-Big 12 Teams
Darrell Arthur (Sophomore, Forward), First Team
Brandon Rush, First Team
Mario Chalmers (Junior, Guard), Second Team
Darnell Jackson, Third Team
Big 12 All-Defensive Team
Mario Chalmers
Russell Robinson (Senior, Guard)
Phillips 66 Big 12 Championship All-Tournament Team
Brandon Rush, Most Outstanding Player
Mario Chalmers
NCAA (Midwest) Regional All-Tournament Team
Brandon Rush
Mario Chalmers
Sasha Kaun (Senior, Center)
NCAA basketball tournament Most Outstanding Player
Mario Chalmers
