= 2007–08 Texas A&M Aggies men's basketball team =

American college basketball season

2007–08 Texas A&M Aggies men's basketball
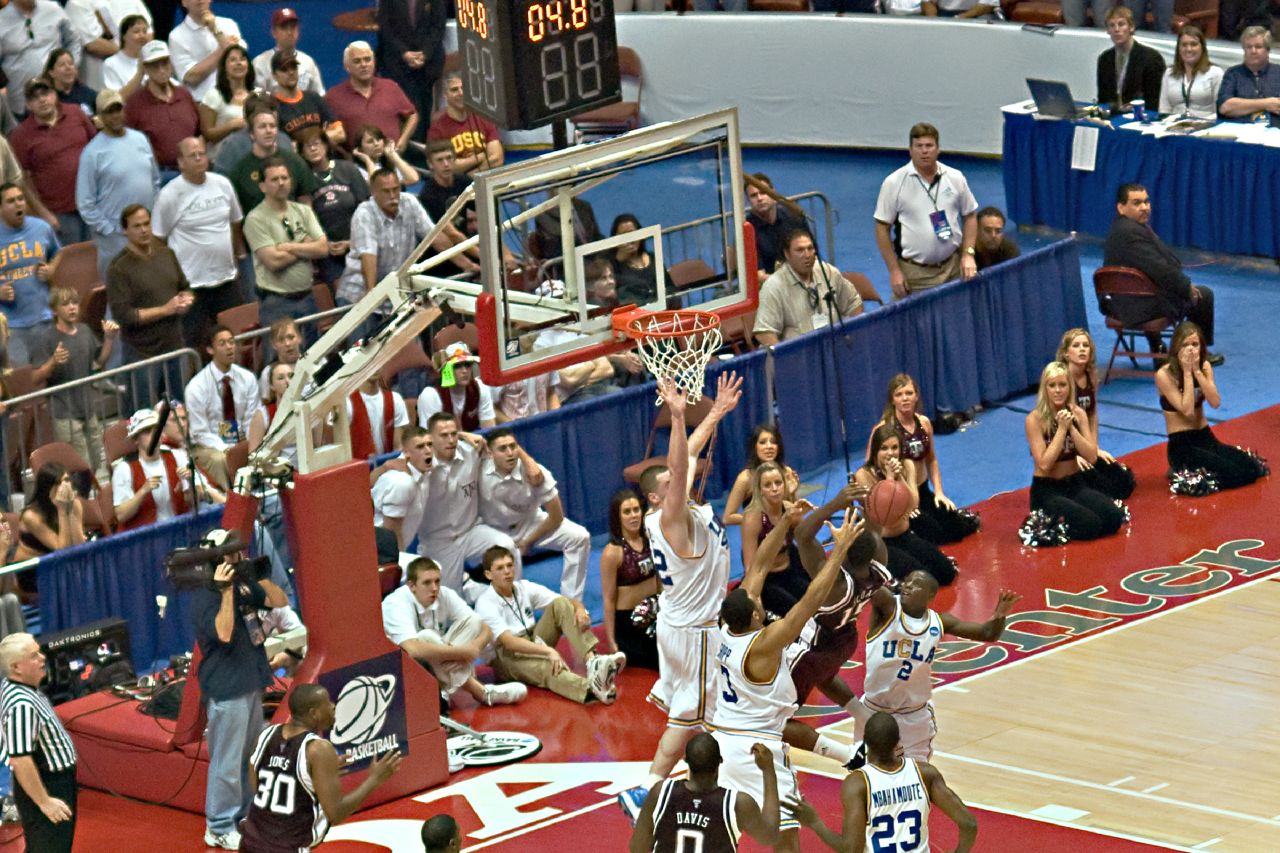

2007–08 NIT Season Tip-Off Champions

NCAA tournament, second round
- Conference: Big 12 Conference
- South
- Record: 25–11 (8–8 Big 12)
- Head coach: Mark Turgeon
- Assistant coaches: Scott Spinelli; Pooh Williamson; Byron Smith
- Home arena: Reed Arena

2007–08 Big 12 men's basketball standings
	Conf.				Overall
Team	W		L	PCT	W		L	PCT
No. 7 Texas	13	–	3	.813	31	–	7	.816
No. 4 Kansas †	13	–	3	.813	37	–	3	.925
Kansas State	10	–	6	.625	21	–	12	.636
Oklahoma	9	–	7	.563	23	–	12	.657
Baylor	9	–	7	.563	21	–	11	.656
Texas A&M	8	–	8	.500	25	–	11	.694
Nebraska	7	–	9	.438	20	–	13	.606
Texas Tech	7	–	9	.438	16	–	15	.516
Oklahoma State	7	–	9	.438	17	–	16	.515
Missouri	6	–	10	.375	16	–	16	.500
Iowa State	4	–	12	.250	14	–	18	.438
Colorado	3	–	13	.188	12	–	20	.375
† 2008 Big 12 Tournament winner Rankings from AP poll

The 2007–08 Texas A&M Aggies men's basketball team represented Texas A&M University in the 2007–08 college basketball season. The team was led by first-year head coach Mark Turgeon, who replaced Billy Gillispie in April 2007. In 2006–07, the Aggies finished 27–7 (13–3 in the Big 12), advanced to the NCAA Sweet Sixteen, and finished 9th in the final AP Poll — their first top 25 finish since the 1979–80 season.

The 2007–08 team won the NIT Season Tip-Off tournament. The 98–54 home win against Texas Tech matched the Aggies' largest margin of victory set in 1959 against Texas.

== Leading into the season ==
=== Summer games ===
Six Aggie players participated in summer games during the summer prior to the start of the season. Junior Josh Carter participated in the Kobe Bryant Skills Academy in late June, and tried out for the Team USA basketball team for the 2007 Pan American Games. Though Carter was one of the 14 finalists to play for the team, he was one of the two who got eliminated. He later joined Athletes in Action to play several games in Australia. Incoming freshmen B.J. Holmes, DeAndre Jordan, and Nathan Walkup participated in the Global Games in Dallas in June. Jordan later joined Team USA for the under-19 world championship game in Serbia, where the team lost in the gold medal game. Sophomore Donald Sloan played for a different Athletes in Action team in the William Jones Cup in July. Sloan's team finished with a 5–4 record and tied for third place. Sophomore Bryan Davis played for the East Coast All-Stars, who went on a 10-day tour in Belgium and the Netherlands in August. Against the Dutch national team, Davis scored 16 points and made 11 rebounds. Davis' team finished with a 3–4 record.

=== Rankings ===
The preseason Big 12 Coaches' Poll picked the Aggies to finish third. The preseason Coaches Poll ranked the Aggies 14th, tied with the Gonzaga Bulldogs, and the preseason AP Poll ranked the Aggies 16th. ESPN columnist Andy Katz ranked the Aggies 17th in his "pre-preseason" top 25 rankings.

=== Preseason honors ===
Joseph Jones was named to the Wooden Award preseason top 50 list, and the preseason all-Big 12 team. Though Jones declared for the NBA draft in the summer, he withdrew himself prior to the deadline and decided to continue playing for the Aggies his senior season. Josh Carter was the 2007 NCAA leader in 3 point accuracy and currently holds the Big 12 record for career accuracy. Dominique Kirk is a Defensive All-American.

=== Recruiting ===
College recruiting
Name	Hometown	School	Height	Weight	Commit date
Denzell Bowles; PF	Virginia Beach, VA	Kempsville	6 ft 9 in (2.06 m)	235 lb (107 kg)	May 16, 2007
Denzell Bowles; PF	Recruit ratings: Scout: Rivals: (78)				
B.J. Holmes; PG	Houston, TX	Hastings	5 ft 10 in (1.78 m)	160 lb (73 kg)	Jul 31, 2006
B.J. Holmes; PG	Recruit ratings: Scout: Rivals: (85)				
DeAndre Jordan; C	Houston, TX	Christian Life Center	7 ft 0 in (2.13 m)	240 lb (110 kg)	Jul 27, 2006
DeAndre Jordan; C	Recruit ratings: Scout: Rivals: (91)				
Derrek Lewis; SG	Tulsa, OK	Union	6 ft 5 in (1.96 m)	197 lb (89 kg)	Jul 5, 2005
Derrek Lewis; SG	Recruit ratings: Scout: Rivals: (40)				
Nathan Walkup; SF	Deer Park, TX	Deer Park	6 ft 6 in (1.98 m)	185 lb (84 kg)	May 4, 2006
Nathan Walkup; SF	Recruit ratings: Scout: Rivals: (40)				
Overall recruit ranking: Scout: 26
Note: In many cases, Scout, Rivals, 247Sports, On3, and ESPN may conflict in their listings of height and weight.; In these cases, the average was taken. ESPN grades are on a 100-point scale.; Sources: "Texas A&M 2007 Basketball Commitments". Rivals.; "2007 Texas A&M Commits". Scout.; "Scout.com Team Recruiting Rankings". Scout.; "2007 Team Ranking". Rivals.

== Players ==
=== Honors ===
- Senior Joseph Jones, along with Texas Longhorns player D. J. Augustin, was featured on the front cover of the November 15, 2007 issue of Sports Illustrated.
- After the Ouachita Baptist game, freshman DeAndre Jordan had made 16 consecutive field goals, breaking the Big 12 record of 13, set by Nebraska's Mikki Moore in 1998. Jordan also broke the A&M record, which was set in 1978.
- Senior point guard Dominique Kirk started his 110th consecutive game when the Aggies played Rice, breaking the Big 12 record set by Kansas point guard Aaron Miles from 2001 to 2005. Kirk's 110 consecutive starts is also an A&M record.

=== Roster ===
Name	Number	Position	Height	Weight*	Year	Hometown
Davis, Bryan	0	F/C	6–9	250	So.-1L	Dallas, Texas
Lewis, Derreck	2	G	6–5	197	Fr.	Tulsa, Oklahoma
Roland, Derrick	3	G	6–4	190	So.-1L	Dallas, Texas
Graham, Bryson	5	G	6–3	190	Jr.-1L	San Antonio, Texas
Bowles, Denzel	10	F/C	6–10	250	Fr.-HS	Virginia Beach, Virginia
Holmes, B.J.	11	G	6–0	175	Fr.-HS	Houston, Texas
Jordan, DeAndre	12	C	7–0	255	Fr.-HS	Houston, Texas
Darko, Andrew	14	G	6–0	165	Fr.	Conroe, Texas
Sloan, Donald	15	G	6–3	205	So.-1L	Dallas, Texas
Kirk, Dominique	22	G	6–4	185	Sr.-3L	Dallas, Texas
Carter, Josh	23	F	6–7	200	Jr.-2L	Dallas, Texas
Travis, Taylor	25	G	5-8	170	Fr.	Angleton, Texas
Chan, Gary	13	G	6-0	190	Fr.	League City, Texas
Jones, Joseph	30	F	6–9	255	Sr.-3L	Normangee, Texas
Chapman, Chris	31	G	5–11	170	So.	Houston, Texas
Muhlbach, Beau	32	G/F	6–5	205	Sr.-2L	Lufkin, Texas
Elonu, Chinemelu	41	F/C	6–10	235	So.-1L	Houston, Texas
Walkup, Nathan	45	F	6–6	195	Fr.-HS	Houston, Texas
Carrell, Marshall	50	F	6–8	200	Fr.	Paris, Texas

Information from 2007–08 roster and, subject to change.

== Schedule ==
Date time, TV	Rank^{#}	Opponent^{#}	Result	Record	Site (attendance) city, state
Exhibition
11/01/2007; 7:00 pm	No. 16	Emporia State	W 85–73	0–0	Reed Arena (8,521); College Station, TX
11/05/2007; 7:00 pm	No. 16	Tarleton State	W 71–62	0–0	Reed Arena (8,224); College Station, TX
Regular season
11/09/2007*; 7:00 pm, FSN-SW	No. 16	McNeese State	W 73–50	1–0	Reed Arena (9,276); College Station, TX
11/13/2007*; 8:00 pm, ESPNU	No. 15	Oral Roberts; NIT Season Tip-Off	W 67–53	2–0	Reed Arena (8,442); College Station, TX
11/14/2007*; 8:00 pm, ESPNU	No. 15	UTEP; NIT Season Tip-Off	W 81–76	3–0	Reed Arena (8,429); College Station, TX
11/17/2007*; 7:30 pm	No. 15	Ouachita Baptist	W 85–59	4–0	Reed Arena (8,237); College Station, TX
11/21/2007*; 6:00 pm, ESPN2	No. 16	vs. Washington; NIT Season Tip-Off	W 77–63	5–0	Madison Square Garden (N/A); New York City
11/23/2007*; 6:00 pm, ESPN2	No. 16	vs. Ohio State; NIT Season Tip-Off Championship Game	W 70–47	6–0	Madison Square Garden (N/A); New York City
11/28/2007*; 8:00 pm, ESPNU	No. 9	Alabama	W 76–63	7–0	Reed Arena (10,328); College Station, TX
12/02/2007*; 5:00 pm, FSN	No. 9	at Arizona; Big 12/Pac-10 Hardwood Series	L 67–78	7–1	McKale Center (14,598); Tucson, AZ
12/08/2007*; 7:00 pm, FSN-SW	No. 16	Texas State	W 109–73	8–1	Reed Arena (9,879); College Station, TX
12/16/2007*; 1:00 pm, FSN-SW	No. 14	Arkansas–Pine Bluff	W 64–37	9–1	Reed Arena (7,789); College Station, TX
12/19/2007*; 7:00 pm	No. 14	Detroit	W 79–39	10–1	Reed Arena (8,912); College Station, TX
12/22/2007*; 1:00 pm	No. 14	UC–Irvine	W 88–66	11–1	Reed Arena (8,064); College Station, TX
12/29/2007*; 1:00 pm, FSN-SW	No. 14	Florida A&M	W 83–54	12–1	Reed Arena (8,089); College Station, TX
12/31/2007*; 1:00 pm, FSN-SW	No. 12	Rice	W 68–41	13–1	Reed Arena (8,702); College Station, TX
01/05/2008*; 7:00 pm, ESPNU	No. 12	LSU	W 79–53	14–1	Reed Arena (12,255); College Station, TX
01/12/2008; 3:00 pm, ESPN Plus	No. 11	Colorado	W 86–69	15–1 (1–0)	Reed Arena (12,634); College Station, TX
01/16/2008; 8:30 pm, ESPN	No. 10	at Texas Tech	L 53–68	15–2 (1–1)	United Spirit Arena (11,268); Lubbock, TX
01/19/2008; 7:00 pm, ESPN	No. 10	at Kansas State	L 54–75	15–3 (1–2)	Bramlage Coliseum (12,528); Manhattan, KS
01/23/2008; 7:00 pm	No. 18	No. 25 Baylor; Battle of the Brazos	L 110–116 ^{5OT}	15–4 (1–3)	Reed Arena (12,234); College Station, TX
01/26/2008; 1:00 pm, ESPN	No. 18	at Oklahoma State	W 59–56	16–4 (2–3)	Gallagher-Iba Arena (12,452); Stillwater, OK
01/30/2008; 8:00 pm, ESPN	No. 23	No. 10 Texas; Lone Star Showdown	W 80–63	17–4 (3–3)	Reed Arena (13,555); College Station, TX
02/02/2008; 3:00 pm, ESPN Plus	No. 23	Oklahoma	W 60–52	18–4 (4–3)	Reed Arena (13,158); College Station, TX
02/05/2008; 7:00 pm, ESPN Plus	No. 18	at Iowa State	W 69–51	19–4 (5–3)	Hilton Coliseum (11,955); Ames, IA
02/09/2008; 12:30 pm, ESPN Plus	No. 18	at Missouri	W 77–69	20–4 (6–3)	Mizzou Arena; Columbia, MO
02/16/2008; 2:30 pm, ABC	No. 16	Oklahoma State	L 54–59	20–5 (6–4)	Reed Arena (13,584); College Station, TX
02/18/2008; 8:00 pm, ESPN	No. 22	at No. 7 Texas; Lone Star Showdown	L 50–77	20–6 (6–5)	Frank Erwin Center (16,755); Austin, TX
02/23/2008; 3:00 pm, ESPN Plus	No. 22	Nebraska	L 59–65	20–7 (6–6)	Reed Arena (11,207); College Station, TX
02/27/2008; 7:00 pm, ESPN Plus		Texas Tech	W 98–54	21–7 (7–6)	Reed Arena (10,032); College Station, TX
03/01/2008; 1:00 pm, ESPN		at Oklahoma	L 37–68	21–8 (7–7)	Lloyd Noble Center (12,202); Norman, OK
03/05/2008; 8:00 pm, ESPN		at Baylor; Battle of the Brazos	W 71–57	22–8 (8–7)	Ferrell Center (10,545); Waco, TX
03/08/2008; 3:00 pm, CBS		No. 5 Kansas	L 55–72	22–9 (8–8)	Reed Arena (12,054); College Station, TX
Postseason Big 12 Tournament
03/13/2008; 8:30 pm, ESPN Plus		vs. Iowa State; Phillips 66 Big 12 Conference tournament	W 60–47	23–9	Sprint Center (18,758); Kansas City, Missouri
03/14/2008; 8:20 pm, ESPN Plus		vs. Kansas State; Phillips 66 Big 12 Conference tournament	W 63–60	24–9	Sprint Center (18,897); Kansas City, Missouri
03/15/2008; 3:20 pm, ESPN Plus		vs. #5 Kansas; Phillips 66 Big 12 Conference tournament	L 71–77	24–10	Sprint Center (18,897); Kansas City, Missouri
NCAA Tournament
03/20/2008; 6:25 pm, CBS		vs. BYU; First Round	W 67–62	25–10	Honda Center (N/A); Anaheim, California
03/22/2008; 8:15 pm, CBS		vs. #3 UCLA; Second Round	L 49–51	25–11	Honda Center (N/A); Anaheim, California
*Non-conference game. ^{#}Rankings from AP Poll. (#) Tournament seedings in parentheses. All times are in Central Standard Time.
