= Marshall Brown (basketball, born 1985) =

American basketball player

Personal information
- Born: March 11, 1985 (age 40) Austin, Texas, U.S.
- Listed height: 6 ft 7 in (2.01 m)
- Listed weight: 225 lb (102 kg)

Career information
- High school: LB Johnson (Austin, Texas)
- College: Missouri (2004–2008)
- NBA draft: 2008: undrafted
- Playing career: 2008–2016
- Position: Small forward

Career history
- 2008–2009: Sheffield Sharks
- 2009: Palmeiras/Lupo/Araraquara
- 2010: Vermont Frost Heaves
- 2011: Halifax Rainmen
- 2011–2012: Rio Grande Valley Vipers
- 2012: Miyazaki Shining Suns
- 2012–2013: Akita Northern Happinets
- 2013–2014: Shiga Lakestars
- 2015: Perth Redbacks
- 2015–2016: Kanazawa Samuraiz
- 2016: BC Budivelnyk

Career highlights
- bj league All-Star (2014)

Marshall D. Brown (born March 11, 1985) is an American former professional basketball player. He played college basketball for the University of Missouri before playing professionally in England, Brazil, Japan, Australia and Ukraine, as well as in the Premier Basketball League and the NBA Development League.

== High school career ==
Brown attended Lyndon B. Johnson High School in Austin, Texas, where he played basketball under head coach Freddy Roland. As a junior in 2002–03, he averaged 24 points, seven rebounds and three assists per game.

In November 2003, Brown signed a National Letter of Intent to play college basketball for the University of Missouri.

Brown earned first-team All-State and first-team All-Region honors playing for Lyndon B. Johnson as a junior and senior, was a three-time all-district selection, and was named the Cen-Tex Player of the Year by the Austin American-Statesman as a senior in 2003–04.

== College career ==
As a freshman at Missouri in 2004–05, Brown scored in double figures five times, including a season-high 12 points against Texas Tech on January 19, 2005. In 33 games (six starts), he averaged 5.1 points and 1.9 rebounds in 16.8 minutes per game.

As a sophomore in 2005–06, Brown scored in double figures 14 times. He recorded his first career double-double with 19 points and a career-high 11 rebounds against Eastern Illinois on December 28, and scored a season-high 21 points on 8-for-12 shooting against Oklahoma on January 10. In 28 games (27 starts), he averaged 9.6 points, 4.8 rebounds and 1.4 assists in 27.2 minutes per game.

As a junior in 2006–07, Brown finished the year as one of three Tigers in double figures, averaging 10.1 points, 4.2 rebounds, 1.5 assists and 0.8 steals in 30 games. He recorded a career-high 28 points on 9-for-13 shooting and 8-for-8 from the free throw line against Kansas State on January 13, 2007.

Following his junior season, Brown was diagnosed with a stress fracture in his pelvis which, along with a broken foot he occurred a few months later, sidelined him for the majority of the 2007 offseason. The injuries disrupted his senior season preparation as he went into the 2007–08 season with a lesser role in coach Mike Anderson's rotation. As a senior, he averaged a career-low 4.5 points and made just three starts in 31 total games. He scored in double figures in five games, recording a season-high 14 points on 6-for-9 shooting against Texas on January 12, 2008.

=== College statistics ===
Year	Team	GP	GS	MPG	FG%	3P%	FT%	RPG	APG	SPG	BPG	PPG
2004–05	Missouri	33	6	16.8	.422	.379	.640	1.9	.5	.6	.2	5.1
2005–06	Missouri	28	27	27.2	.456	.158	.687	4.8	1.4	.7	.3	9.6
2006–07	Missouri	30	29	21.8	.450	.294	.705	4.2	1.5	.8	.4	10.1
2007–08	Missouri	31	3	13.1	.409	.386	.625	1.9	.9	.5	.3	4.5
Career		122	65	19.5	.439	.313	.678	3.1	1.1	.6	.3	7.2

== Professional career ==
=== 2008–09 season ===
On November 7, 2008, Brown was selected by the Austin Toros in the ninth round of the 2008 NBA Development League Draft. However, he was later waived by the Toros on November 21, 2008, after appearing in one preseason game. In December 2008, he signed with the Sheffield Sharks for the rest of the 2008–09 BBL season. In 21 games for the Sharks, he averaged 13.3 points, 6.7 rebounds, 2.5 assists and 1.2 steals per game.

=== 2009–10 season ===
On September 14, 2009, Brown signed with Palmeiras/Lupo/Araraquara of the Novo Basquete Brasil. However, in December 2009, he was released by the club due to off court issues that were not specified. Later that month, he signed with the Vermont Frost Heaves for the 2010 PBL season. He led Vermont in scoring with 16.8 points in 19 games as the team finished the season with a 12–8 record.

=== 2010–11 season ===
On December 16, 2010, Brown signed with the Halifax Rainmen for the 2011 PBL season. In 22 games for Halifax, he averaged 12.3 points, 5.0 rebounds and 1.4 assists per game.

=== 2011–12 season ===
On November 3, 2011, Brown joined the Rio Grande Valley Vipers of the NBA Development League, going on to make his debut for the team on November 25 in the season opener against the Erie BayHawks. In 31 minutes of action off the bench, he recorded 18 points and 8 rebounds in a 122–113 win. On December 10, 2011, he signed with the Portland Trail Blazers, but was waived a week later prior to the start of the 2011–12 NBA season. On December 20, he returned to the Vipers where he played out the season. In 41 games for the Vipers, he averaged 10.2 points, 4.7 rebounds and 1.2 assists per game.

=== 2012–13 season ===
In September 2012, Brown signed with the Miyazaki Shining Suns for the 2012–13 bj league season. However, in November 2012, he left the financially troubled team after appearing in just six games, and the following month, he joined the Akita Northern Happinets for the rest of the season. In 32 games for Akita, he averaged 19.7 points, 8.3 rebounds and 3.6 assists per game.

=== 2013–14 season ===
In August 2013, Brown signed with the Shiga Lakestars for the 2013–14 bj league season, returning to Japan for a second stint. On December 27, 2013, he was named to the Eastern Conference All-Star squad for the January 26 game. In 57 games for Shiga, he averaged 15.9 points, 6.7 rebounds, 2.9 assists and 1.2 steals per game.

=== 2014–15 season ===
On March 11, 2015, Brown signed with the Perth Redbacks for the 2015 State Basketball League season. In his second game for the team on March 20, he scored 48 points against the Lakeside Lightning. He was subsequently named Player of the Week for round two. He left the team in June 2015. In 15 games, he averaged 18.2 points, 6.6 rebounds and 2.3 assists per game.

=== 2015–16 season ===
In August 2015, Brown signed with Kanazawa Samuraiz for the 2015–16 bj league season, returning to Japan for a third stint. On November 14, he scored a then season-high 29 points in a 75–72 win over Bambitious Nara. On January 17, 2016, he recorded a season-high 32 points and 11 rebounds in an 84–68 win over Rizing Fukuoka. On March 13, he had a 28-point game in a 92–52 win over Hamamatsu. In 51 games for Kanazawa, Brown averaged 13.4 points, 6.9 rebounds, 2.8 assists and 1.1 steals per game.

=== 2016–17 season ===
In September 2016, Brown signed with BC Budivelnyk of the Ukrainian Basketball SuperLeague. He left the team in October after averaging 3.2 points and 3.0 rebounds in five games.

== Career statistics ==
Legend
GP	Games played	GS	Games started	MPG	Minutes per game
FG%	Field goal percentage	3P%	3-point field goal percentage	FT%	Free throw percentage
RPG	Rebounds per game	APG	Assists per game	SPG	Steals per game
BPG	Blocks per game	PPG	Points per game	**Bold**	Career high

=== Regular season ===
Year	Team	GP	GS	MPG	FG%	3P%	FT%	RPG	APG	SPG	BPG	PPG
2012–13	Miyazaki	6		28.5	.414	.367	.609	5.8	2.2	.8	.3	16.2
2012–13	Akita	34	27	33.0	.439	.343	.654	7.6	3.3	.9	.4	19.5
2013–14	Shiga	52	52	31.7	.419	.375	.665	6.9	3.1	1.2	.6	16.2
2015–16	Kanazawa	50	45	27.7	.456	.325	.615	6.9	2.7	1.1	.4	13.4
Japan totals		142		30.4	.436	.355	.646	7.0	2.9	1.1	.5	16.0

== Personal ==
Brown has five siblings (two brothers and three sisters), and lists his grandfather and Michael Jordan as people he looked up to growing up.
