= 2007–08 NCAA Division I men's basketball rankings =

- Season: 2007–08
- NCAA Tournament: 2008
- Preseason No. 1: North Carolina
- NCAA Tournament Champions: Kansas
NCAA Division I men's basketball rankings


Two human polls made up the 2007–08 NCAA Division I men's basketball rankings, the AP Poll and the Coaches Poll, in addition to various publications' preseason polls.

== Legend ==
	Increase in ranking
	Decrease in ranking
	Not ranked previous week
Italics	Number of first place votes
(#-#)	Win–loss record
т	Tied with team above or below also with this symbol

== AP poll ==
The Associated Press (AP) preseason poll was released on November 5, 2007. This poll is compiled by sportswriters across the nation. In Division I men's and women's college basketball, the AP Poll is largely just a tool to compare schools throughout the season and spark debate, as it has no bearing on postseason play. Generally, all top 25 teams in the poll are invited to the NCAA basketball tournament, also known as March Madness.

	Preseason Nov 5	Week 1 Nov 12	Week 2 Nov 19	Week 3 Nov 26	Week 4 Dec 3	Week 5 Dec 10	Week 6 Dec 17	Week 7 Dec 24	Week 8 Dec 31	Week 9 Jan 7	Week 10 Jan 14	Week 11 Jan 21	Week 12 Jan 28	Week 13 Feb 4	Week 14 Feb 11	Week 15 Feb 18	Week 16 Feb 25	Week 17 Mar 3	Week 18 Mar 10	Week 19 Mar 17	
1.	North Carolina 29	North Carolina (0–0) 29	North Carolina (2–0) 26	North Carolina (5–0) 28	North Carolina (7–0) 45	North Carolina (8–0) 48	North Carolina (9–0) 48	North Carolina (11–0) 47	North Carolina (13–0) 45	North Carolina (15–0) 46	North Carolina (17–0) 45	Memphis (17–0) 49	Memphis (19–0) 46	Memphis (21–0) 72	Memphis (23–0) 72	Memphis (25–0) 72	Tennessee (25–2) 69	North Carolina (27–2) 38	North Carolina (29–2) 52	North Carolina (32–2) 53	1.
2.	UCLA 24	UCLA (1–0) 24	UCLA (3–0) 26	UCLA (6–0) 25	Memphis (6–0) 22	Memphis (7–0) 19	Memphis (8–0) 19	Memphis (10–0) 24	Memphis (11–0) 26	Memphis (13–0) 25	Memphis (15–0) 24	Kansas (18–0) 23	Kansas (20–0) 26	Duke (19–1)	Duke (21–1)	Tennessee (23–2)	Memphis (26–1)	Memphis (28–1) 21	Memphis (30–1) 13	Memphis (33–1) 13	2.
3.	Memphis 18	Memphis (2–0) 18	Memphis (4–0) 19	Memphis (5–0) 18	Kansas (7–0) 2	Kansas (9–0) 2	Kansas (10–0) 2	Kansas (12–0) 1	Kansas (13–0) 1	Kansas (14–0) 1	Kansas (16–0) 3	Tennessee (16–1)	Duke (17–1)	North Carolina (21–1)	Kansas (23–1)	North Carolina (24–2)	North Carolina (26–2) 2	UCLA (26–3) 12	UCLA (28–3) 5	UCLA (31–3) 5	3.
4.	Kansas	Kansas (2–0)	Kansas (3–0)	Kansas (5–0)	Texas (7–0) 2	Texas (9–0) 2	Texas (10–0) 2	Washington State (11–0)	Washington State (12–0)	Washington State (13–0)	UCLA (16–1)	Duke (15–1)	North Carolina (19–1)	Kansas (21–1)	Tennessee (21–2)	Kansas (24–2)	UCLA (24–3) 1	Tennessee (26–3) 1	Tennessee (28–3) 2	Kansas (31–3) 1	4.
5.	Georgetown 1	Georgetown (1–0) 1	Georgetown (2–0) 1	Georgetown (3–0) 1	Georgetown (5–0) 1	Georgetown (7–0) 1	Georgetown (8–0) 1	UCLA (11–1)	UCLA (12–1)	UCLA (14–1)	Georgetown (13–1)	North Carolina (18–1)	UCLA (18–2)	UCLA (20–2)	North Carolina (22–2)	Duke (22–2)	Texas (23–4)	Kansas (26–3)	Kansas (28–3)	Tennessee (29–4)	5.
6.	Louisville	Louisville (0–0)	Louisville (2–0)	Washington State (6–0)	Duke (8–0)	Duke (9–0)	Duke (9–0)	Pittsburgh (11–0)	Michigan State (12–1)	Michigan State (13–1)	Tennessee (14–1)	Washington State (16–1)	Georgetown (16–2)	Georgetown (18–2)	UCLA (21–3)	UCLA (22–3)	Kansas (24–3)	Duke (25–3)	Texas (26–5)	Wisconsin (29–4)	6.
7.	Tennessee	Tennessee (1–0)	Tennessee (3–0)	Duke (6–0)	UCLA (7–1)	Washington State (9–0)	Washington State (9–0)	Michigan State (11–1)	Georgetown (9–1)	Georgetown (11–1)	Duke (13–1)	Indiana (16–1)	Tennessee (17–2)	Tennessee (19–2)	Stanford (20–3)	Texas (21–4)	Duke (23–3)	Stanford (24–4)	Duke (26–4)	Texas (28–6)	7.
8.	Michigan State	Indiana (0–0)	Indiana (2–0)	Texas (5–0)	Washington State (7–0)	UCLA (8–1)	UCLA (9–1)	Georgetown (8–1)	Tennessee (12–1)	Tennessee (12–1)	Washington State (14–1)	UCLA (16–2)	Michigan State (18–2)	Wisconsin (18–3)	Georgetown (19–3)	Butler (24–2)	Stanford (22–4)	Xavier (25–4)	Wisconsin (26–4)	Georgetown (27–5)	8.
9.	Indiana	Washington State (1–0)	Washington State (3–0)	Texas A&M (6–0)	Michigan State (6–1)	Michigan State (8–1)	Michigan State (9–1)	Texas (11–1)	Duke (10–1)	Duke (11–1)	Indiana (14–1)	Georgetown (14–2)	Washington State (17–2)	Stanford (18–3)	Butler (21–2)	Stanford (21–4)	Xavier (24–4)	Texas (24–5)	Georgetown (25–4)	Duke (27–5)	9.
10.	Washington State	Marquette (1–0)	Michigan State (2–0)	Michigan State (4–1)	Tennessee (7–1)	Marquette (6–1)	Marquette (7–1)	Duke (10–1)	Marquette (10–1)	Indiana (12–1)	Texas A&M (15–1)	Michigan State (16–2)	Texas (16–3)	Butler (19–2)	Michigan State (20–3)	Xavier (21–4)	Wisconsin (23–4)	Wisconsin (24–4)	Xavier (26–5)	Stanford (26–7)	10.
11.	Marquette	Oregon (2–0)	Marquette (2–0)	Tennessee (5–1)	Marquette (5–1)	Pittsburgh (9–0)	Pittsburgh (10–0)	Tennessee (11–1)	Indiana (11–1)	Texas A&M (14–1)	Michigan State (14–2)	Wisconsin (15–2)	Indiana (17–2)	Michigan State (19–3)	Texas (19–4)	Wisconsin (21–4)	Georgetown (22–4)	Georgetown (24–4)	Stanford (24–6)	Butler (29–3)	11.
12.	Oregon	Michigan State (0–0)	Oregon (4–0)	Louisville (4–1)	Pittsburgh (7–0)	Tennessee (8–1)	Tennessee (9–1)	Marquette (9–1)	Texas A&M (12–1)	Texas (13–2)	Butler (16–1)	Texas (14–3)	Butler (19–2)	Texas (17–4)	Xavier (20–4)	Georgetown (20–4)	Indiana (23–4)	Louisville (24–6)	Butler (28–3)	Xavier (27–6)	12.
13.	Duke	Duke (1–0)	Duke (2–0)	Marquette (4–1)	Butler (7–0)	Indiana (8–1)	Indiana (9–1)	Indiana (10–1)	Pittsburgh (11–1)	Vanderbilt (15–0)	Marquette (13–2)	Pittsburgh (15–3)	Wisconsin (16–3)	Xavier (18–4)	Indiana (20–3)	Connecticut (20–5)	Louisville (22–6)	Connecticut (23–6)	Louisville (24–7)	Louisville (24–8)	13.
14.	Gonzaga	Gonzaga (1–0)	Gonzaga (3–0)	Pittsburgh (5–0)	Louisville (5–1)	Texas A&M (8–1)	Texas A&M (9–1)	Texas A&M (11–1)	Texas (11–2)	Butler (13–1)	Dayton (14–1)	Vanderbilt (17–2)	Stanford (16–3)	Indiana (18–3)	Drake (22–1)	Purdue (21–5)	Butler (25–3)	Butler (27–3)	Notre Dame (24–6)	Drake (28–4)	14.
15.	Texas	Texas A&M (1–0)	Texas (3–0)	Indiana (4–1)	Indiana (6–1)	Clemson (8–0)	Clemson (8–0)	Vanderbilt (11–0)	Vanderbilt (12–0)	Marquette (11–2)	Pittsburgh (14–2)	Butler (17–2)	Xavier (17–4)	Drake (20–1)	Wisconsin (19–4)	Indiana (21–4)	Connecticut (21–6)	Purdue (23–6)	Connecticut (24–7)	Notre Dame (24–7)	15.
16.	Texas A&M	Texas (0–0)	Texas A&M (4–0)	Butler (6–0)	Texas A&M (7–1)	Oregon (7–1)	Butler (9–1)	Butler (11–1)	Butler (12–1)	Mississippi (13–0)	Vanderbilt (16–1)	Dayton (14–2)	Drake (18–1)	Marquette (16–4)	Texas A&M (20–4)	Drake (23–2)	Purdue (21–6)	Vanderbilt (24–5)	Drake (28–4)	Connecticut (24–8)	16.
17.	Arizona	Arizona (0–0)	Pittsburgh (4–0)	Oregon (5–1)	Gonzaga (7–1)	Xavier (7–1)	Vanderbilt (10–0)	Arizona (9–2)	Villanova (10–1)	Dayton (12–1)	Wisconsin (13–2)	Mississippi (15–2)	Marquette (14–4)	Washington State (17–4)	Connecticut (18–5)	Washington State (20–5)	Notre Dame (21–5)	Michigan State (23–6)	Purdue (24–7)	Pittsburgh (26–9)	17.
18.	USC	Arkansas (1–0)	Kansas State (3–0)	Clemson (5–0)	Clemson (7–0)	Butler (8–1)	Gonzaga (8–2)	Villanova (9–1)	Mississippi (12–0)	Clemson (12–2)	Mississippi (14–1)	Texas A&M (15–3) т	Pittsburgh (16–4)	Texas A&M (18–4)	Kansas State (17–5)	Louisville (20–6)	Vanderbilt (23–4)	Indiana (24–5)	Vanderbilt (25–6)	Michigan State (25–8)	18.
19.	Arkansas	Pittsburgh (3–0)	Southern Illinois (1–0)	Gonzaga (5–1)	Oregon (6–1)	Gonzaga (8–2)	Arizona (7–2)	Miami (FL) (12–0)	Clemson (11–1)	Villanova (11–2)	Texas (13–3)	Villanova (13–3) т	Vanderbilt (17–3)	Connecticut (16–5)	Purdue (19–5)	Michigan State (20–5)	Michigan State (22–5)	Notre Dame (22–6)	Michigan State (24–7)	Vanderbilt (26–7)	19.
20.	Kentucky	Stanford (3–0)	Villanova (2–0)	Wisconsin (5–0)	BYU (6–1)	Vanderbilt (9–0)	Villanova (8–1)	BYU (10–2)	Dayton (11–1)	Pittsburgh (12–2)	Xavier (14–3)	Stanford (15–3)	Florida (18–3)	Kansas State (15–5)	Notre Dame (18–4)	Vanderbilt (22–4)	Drake (24–3)	Drake (25–4)	Gonzaga (25–6)	Purdue (24–8)	20.
21.	NC State	NC State (0–0)	Syracuse (3–0)	BYU (5–1)	Xavier (6–1)	Arizona (6–2)	BYU (9–2)	Clemson (10–1)	Arizona (9–3)	Wisconsin (12–2)	Miami (FL) (14–1)	Marquette (13–4)	St. Mary's (17–2)	Pittsburgh (17–5)	Washington State (18–5)	Notre Dame (19–5)	Marquette (20–6)	Marquette (21–7)	Washington State (23–7)	Washington State (24–8)	21.
22.	Pittsburgh	Kansas State (2–0)	Butler (3–0)	USC (5–1)	Arizona (5–2)	Louisville (5–2)	Miami (FL) (9–0)	Mississippi (11–0)	USC (9–3)	Rhode Island (14–1)	Arizona State (13–2)	Drake (16–1)	Kansas State (14–4)	Notre Dame (16–4)	Pittsburgh (18–5)	Texas A&M (20–5)	Washington State (21–6)	Gonzaga (23–6)	Indiana (25–6)	Clemson (24–9)	22.
23.	Stanford	Southern Illinois (0–0)	Virginia (3–0)	Xavier (4–1)	Vanderbilt (7–0)	Villanova (7–1)	Oregon (8–2)	West Virginia (10–1)	Rhode Island (13–1)	Stanford (12–2)	Rhode Island (15–2)	Xavier (15–4)	Texas A&M (16–4)	Vanderbilt (18–4)	Louisville (18–6)	St. Mary's (22–3)	Kent State (23–5)	Washington State (22–7)	Davidson (25–6)	Davidson (26–6)	23.
24.	Southern Illinois	Villanova (1–0)	Clemson	NC State (4–1)	USC (6–2)	St. Mary's (7–0)	West Virginia (8–1)	USC (8–3)	Stanford (11–1)	Xavier (12–3)	Clemson (13–3)	Arizona State (14–3)	Mississippi (15–3)	Purdue (17–5)	Vanderbilt (20–4)	Kansas State (18–6)	Gonzaga (21–6)	Clemson (21–7)	BYU (25–6)	Gonzaga (25–7)	24.
25.	Kansas State	Butler (1–0)	Florida	Kansas State (5–1)	Villanova (5–1)	BYU (7–2)	USC (6–3)	Rhode Island (11–1)	Wisconsin (10–2)	Miami (FL) (13–1)	Villanova (11–3)	Baylor (15–2)	Baylor (16–3)	St. Mary's (18–3)	St. Mary's (20–3)	Marquette (18–6)	St. Mary's (23–4)	Davidson (23–6)	Marquette (22–8)	Marquette (24–9)	25.
	Preseason Nov 5	Week 1 Nov 12	Week 2 Nov 19	Week 3 Nov 26	Week 4 Dec 3	Week 5 Dec 10	Week 6 Dec 17	Week 7 Dec 24	Week 8 Dec 31	Week 9 Jan 7	Week 10 Jan 14	Week 11 Jan 21	Week 12 Jan 28	Week 13 Feb 4	Week 14 Feb 11	Week 15 Feb 18	Week 16 Feb 25	Week 17 Mar 3	Week 18 Mar 10	Week 19 Mar 17	
		Dropped: USC (0–1); Kentucky (1–1)	Dropped: Arizona (1–1); Arkansas (3–1); Stanford (4–1); NC State (1–1)	Dropped: Southern Illinois (3–1); Villanova (4–1); Syracuse (4–1); Virginia (5–1); Florida (5–1)	Dropped: Wisconsin (5–1); NC State (4–2); Kansas State (5–2)	Dropped: USC (6–3)	Dropped: Xavier (8–2); Louisville (5–3); St. Mary's (7–1)	Dropped: Gonzaga (9–3); Oregon (8–3)	Dropped: Miami (FL) (12–1); BYU (10–3); West Virginia (10–2)	Dropped: Arizona (10–4); USC (9–5)	Dropped: Stanford (13–3)	Dropped: Miami (FL) (14–3); Rhode Island (15–3); Clemson (14–4)	Dropped: Dayton (14–4); Villanova (13–5); Arizona State (14–5)	Dropped: Florida (18–4); Mississippi (16–4); Baylor (16–4)	Dropped: Marquette (16–6)	Dropped: Pittsburgh (19–6)	Dropped: Kansas State (18–8); Texas A&M (20–7)	Dropped: Kent State (23–6); St. Mary's (24–5)	Dropped: Clemson (22–8)	Dropped: Indiana (25–7); BYU (27–7)	

== ESPN/USA Today Coaches Poll ==
The Coaches Poll is the second oldest poll still in use after the AP Poll. It is compiled by a rotating group of 31 college Division I head coaches. The Poll operates by Borda count. Each voting member ranks teams from 1 to 25. Each team then receives points for their ranking in reverse order: Number 1 earns 25 points, number 2 earns 24 points, and so forth. The points are then combined and the team with the highest points is then ranked #1; second highest is ranked #2 and so forth. Only the top 25 teams with points are ranked, with teams receiving first place votes noted the quantity next to their name. Any team receiving votes after the top 25 are listed after the top 25 by their point totals. However, these are not real rankings: They are not considered #26, #27, etc. The maximum points a single team can earn is 775. The preseason poll was released on November 5, 2007.

	Preseason Nov 5	Week 1 Nov 12	Week 2 Nov 19	Week 3 Nov 26	Week 4 Dec 3	Week 5 Dec 10	Week 6 Dec 17	Week 7 Dec 24	Week 8 Dec 31	Week 9 Jan 7	Week 10 Jan 14	Week 11 Jan 21	Week 12 Jan 28	Week 13 Feb 4	Week 14 Feb 11	Week 15 Feb 18	Week 16 Feb 25	Week 17 Mar 3	Week 18 Mar 11	Week 19 Mar 17	Week 20 Final	
1.	North Carolina 10	North Carolina (0–0) 14	North Carolina (2–0) 14 т	UCLA (6–0) 12	North Carolina (7–0) 23	North Carolina (8–0) 25	North Carolina (9–0) 24	North Carolina (11–0) 23	North Carolina (13–0) 23	North Carolina (15–0) 23	North Carolina (17–0) 23	Memphis (17–0) 21	Memphis (19–0) 20	Memphis (21–0) 31	Memphis (23–0) 31	Memphis (25–0) 31	Tennessee (25–2) 31	North Carolina (27–2) 19	North Carolina (29–2) 23	North Carolina (32–2) 23	Kansas (37–3) 31	1.
2.	UCLA 12	UCLA (1–0) 10	UCLA (3–0) 10 т	North Carolina (5–0) 13	Memphis (6–0) 6	Memphis (7–0) 4	Memphis (8–0) 4	Memphis (10–0) 6	Memphis (11–0) 7	Memphis (13–0) 6	Memphis (15–0) 6	Kansas (18–0) 10	Kansas (20–0) 11	Duke (19–1)	Duke (21–1)	Tennessee (23–2)	North Carolina (26–2)	UCLA (26–3) 6	UCLA (28–3) 4	UCLA (31–1) 5	Memphis (38–3)	2.
3.	Memphis 8	Memphis (2–0) 6	Memphis (4–0) 6	Memphis (5–0) 5	Kansas (7–0) 1	Kansas (9–0) 1	Kansas (10–0) 1	Kansas (12–0) 2	Kansas (13–0) 1	Kansas (14–0) 2	Kansas (16–0) 2	Duke (15–1)	Duke (17–1)	North Carolina (21–1)	Kansas (23–1)	North Carolina (24–2)	Memphis (26–1)	Memphis (28–1) 6	Memphis (30–1) 3	Memphis (33–1) 3	North Carolina (36–3)	3.
4.	Kansas 1	Kansas (2–0) 1	Kansas (3–0) 1	Kansas (5–0) 1	Georgetown (5–0) 1	Georgetown (7–0) 1	Georgetown (8–0) 1	Washington State (11–0)	Washington State (12–0)	Washington State (13–0)	UCLA (16–1)	North Carolina (18–1)	North Carolina (19–1)	UCLA (20–2)	Tennessee (21–2)	Duke (22–2)	UCLA (24–3)	Tennessee (26–3)	Tennessee (28–3)	Kansas (31–3)	UCLA (35–4)	4.
5.	Georgetown	Georgetown (1–0)	Georgetown (2–0)	Georgetown (3–0)	Texas (7–0)	Texas (9–0)	Texas (10–0) 1	UCLA (11–1)	UCLA (12–1)	UCLA (14–1)	Duke (13–1)	Tennessee (16–1)	UCLA (18–2)	Kansas (21–1)	North Carolina (22–2)	Kansas (24–2)	Texas (23–4)	Duke (25–3)	Kansas (28–3) 1	Wisconsin (29–4)	Texas (31–7)	5.
6.	Louisville	Louisville (0–0)	Louisville (2–0)	Washington State (6–0)	Washington State (7–0)	Washington State (9–0)	Washington State (9–0)	Pittsburgh (11–0)	Michigan State (12–1)	Michigan State (13–1)	Georgetown (13–1)	Washington State (16–1)	Georgetown (16–2)	Georgetown (18–2)	UCLA (21–3)	UCLA (22–3)	Duke (23–3)	Kansas (26–3)	Wisconsin (26–4)	Tennessee (29–4)	Louisville (27–9)	6.
7.	Tennessee	Tennessee (1–0)	Tennessee (3–0)	Duke (6–0)	Duke (8–0)	Duke (9–0)	Duke (9–0)	Michigan State (11–1)	Georgetown (9–1)	Duke (11–1)	Tennessee (14–1)	UCLA (16–2)	Michigan State (18–2)	Tennessee (19–2)	Stanford (20–3)	Texas (21–4)	Kansas (24–3)	Stanford (24–4)	Duke (26–4)	Texas (28–6)	Tennessee (31–5)	7.
8.	Michigan State	Indiana (0–0)	Indiana (2–0)	Texas (5–0)	UCLA (7–1)	UCLA (8–1)	UCLA (9–1)	Georgetown (8–1)	Duke (10–1)	Georgetown (11–1)	Washington State (14–1)	Indiana (16–1)	Tennessee (17–2)	Wisconsin (18–3)	Georgetown (19–3)	Butler (24–2)	Stanford (22–4)	Wisconsin (24–4)	Texas (26–5)	Georgetown (27–5)	Xavier (30–7)	8.
9.	Indiana	Washington State (1–0)	Washington State (3–0)	Texas A&M (6–0)	Pittsburgh (7–0)	Pittsburgh (9–0)	Pittsburgh (10–0)	Texas (11–1)	Tennessee (12–1)	Tennessee (12–1)	Texas A&M (15–1)	Georgetown (16–2)	Washington State (17–2)	Stanford (18–3)	Michigan State (20–3)	Stanford (21–4)	Wisconsin (23–4)	Texas (24–5)	Georgetown (25–4)	Duke (27–5)	Davidson (29–7)	9.
10.	Washington State	Duke (1–0)	Duke (2–0)	Louisville (4–1)	Michigan State (6–1)	Michigan State (8–1)	Michigan State (9–1)	Duke (10–1)	Texas A&M (12–1)	Texas A&M (14–1)	Indiana (14–1)	Michigan State (16–2)	Texas (16–3)	Michigan State (19–3)	Butler (21–2)	Wisconsin (21–4)	Georgetown (22–4)	Georgetown (24–4)	Butler (28–3)	Butler (29–3)	Wisconsin (31–5)	10.
11.	Duke	Marquette (1–0)	Michigan State (2–0) т	Pittsburgh (5–0)	Louisville (5–1)	Tennessee (8–1)	Texas A&M (9–1)	Texas A&M (11–1)	Marquette (10–1)	Indiana (12–1)	Michigan State (14–2)	Wisconsin (15–2)	Indiana (17–2)	Butler (19–2)	Texas (19–4)	Georgetown (20–4)	Xavier (24–4)	Xavier (25–4)	Stanford (24–6)	Stanford (26–7)	Stanford (28–8)	11.
12.	Marquette	Michigan State (0–0)	Oregon (4–0) т	Tennessee (5–1)	Tennessee (7–1)	Texas A&M (8–1)	Tennessee (9–1)	Tennessee (11–1)	Indiana (11–1)	Vanderbilt (15–0)	Butler (16–1)	Texas (14–3)	Butler (19–2)	Texas (17–4)	Indiana (20–3)	Xavier (20–5)	Indiana (23–4)	Butler (27–3)	Xavier (26–5)	Xavier (27–6)	Georgetown (28–6)	12.
13.	Oregon	Oregon (2–0)	Marquette (2–0)	Michigan State (4–1)	Butler (7–0)	Marquette (6–1)	Marquette (7–1)	Marquette (9–1)	Pittsburgh (11–1)	Texas (13–2)	Marquette (13–2)	Vanderbilt (17–2)	Wisconsin (16–3)	Indiana (18–3)	Xavier (20–4)	Connecticut (20–5)	Butler (25–3)	Louisville (24–6)	Louisville (24–7)	Louisville (24–8)	Michigan State (27–9)	13.
14.	Gonzaga т	Gonzaga (1–0)	Gonzaga (3–0)	Marquette (4–1)	Texas A&M (7–1)	Indiana (8–1)	Indiana (9–1)	Indiana (10–1)	Texas (11–2)	Butler (13–1)	Vanderbilt (16–1)	Butler (17–2)	Stanford (16–3)	Xavier (18–4)	Wisconsin (19–4)	Indiana (21–4)	Vanderbilt (23–4)	Connecticut (23–6)	Notre Dame (24–6)	Drake (28–4)	Butler (30–4)	14.
15.	Texas A&M т	Texas A&M (1–0)	Texas A&M (4–0)	Indiana (4–1)	Indiana (6–1) т	Clemson (8–0)	Clemson (8–0)	Vanderbilt (11–0)	Vanderbilt (12–0)	Mississippi (13–0)	Mississippi (14–1)	Mississippi (15–2)	Xavier (17–4)	Drake (20–1)	Drake (22–1)	Purdue (21–5)	Michigan State (22–5)	Purdue (23–6)	Connecticut (24–7)	Notre Dame (24–7)	Washington State (26–9)	15.
16.	Texas	Texas (0–0)	Texas (3–0)	Butler (6–0)	Marquette (5–1) т	Oregon (7–1)	Villanova (8–1)	Villanova (9–1)	Villanova (10–1)	Marquette (11–2)	Pittsburgh (14–2)	Texas A&M (15–3)	Marquette (14–4)	Marquette (16–4)	Texas A&M (20–4)	Vanderbilt (22–4)	Connecticut (21–6)	Vanderbilt (24–5)	Purdue (24–7)	Vanderbilt (26–7)	Duke (28–6)	16.
17.	Arizona	Arizona (0–0)	Pittsburgh (4–0)	Oregon (5–1)	Clemson (7–0)	Xavier (7–1)	Vanderbilt (10–0)	Butler (11–1)	Butler (12–1)	Villanova (11–2)	Wisconsin (13–2)	Pittsburgh (15–3)	Drake (18–1)	Washington State (17–4)	Connecticut (18–5)	Michigan State (20–5)	Notre Dame (21–5)	Indiana (24–5)	Vanderbilt (25–6)	Connecticut (24–8)	West Virginia (26-11)	17.
18.	USC	Arkansas (1–0)	Southern Illinois (1–0)	Clemson (5–0)	Oregon (6–1)	Villanova (7–1)	Butler (9–1)	Arizona (9–2)	Mississippi (12–0)	Pittsburgh (12–2)	Dayton (14–1)	Villanova (13–3)	Vanderbilt (17–3)	Texas A&M (18–4)	Notre Dame (18–4)	Drake (23–2)	Louisville (22–6)	Michigan State (23–6)	Drake (28–4)	Purdue (24–8)	Pittsburgh (27-10)	18.
19.	Arkansas	Pittsburgh (3–0)	Villanova (2–0)	Gonzaga (5–1)	Gonzaga (7–1)	Butler (8–1)	Arizona (7–2)	Miami (FL) (12–0)	Clemson (11–1)	Clemson (12–2)	Texas (13–3)	Dayton (14–2)	Florida (18–3)	Connecticut (16–5)	Vanderbilt (20–4)	Washington State (20–5)	Purdue (21–6)	Notre Dame (22–6)	Michigan State (24–7)	Pittsburgh (26–9)	Notre Dame (25–8)	19.
20.	Pittsburgh	Stanford (3–0)	Kansas State (3–0)	Wisconsin (5–0)	Xavier (6–1)	Louisville (5–2)	Gonzaga (8–2)	Clemson (10–1)	Stanford (11–1)	Rhode Island (14–1)	Xavier (14–3)	Marquette (13–4)	St. Mary's (17–2)	Vanderbilt (18–4)	Washington State (18–5)	St. Mary's (22–3)	Drake (24–3)	Marquette (21–7)	Indiana (25–6)	Michigan State (25–8)	Purdue (25–9)	20.
21.	Stanford	Southern Illinois (0–0)	Syracuse (3–0)	Villanova (4–1)	Villanova (5–1)	Vanderbilt (9–0)	Oregon (8–2)	BYU (10–2)	Arizona (9–3)	Wisconsin (12–2)	Rhode Island (15–2) т	Stanford (15–3)	Pittsburgh (16–4)	Notre Dame (16–4)	St. Mary's (20–3)	Notre Dame (19–5)	Marquette (20–6)	Drake (25–4)	Washington State (23–7)	Washington State (24–8)	Marquette (25-10)	21.
22.	Kentucky	North Carolina State (0–0)	Clemson (3–0)	Southern Illinois (3–1)	BYU (6–1)	Arizona (6–2)	Miami (FL) (9–0)	Stanford (10–1)	Rhode Island (13–1)	Dayton (12–1)	Villanova (11–3) т	Xavier (15–4)	Mississippi (15–3)	Florida (18–4)	Kansas State (17–5)	Texas A&M (20–5)	Washington State (21–6)	Washington State (22–7)	Gonzaga (25–6)	Clemson (24–9)	WKU (29–7)	22.
23.	Southern Illinois	Villanova (1–0)	Butler (3–0)	BYU (5–1)	Wisconsin (5–1)	Gonzaga (8–2)	BYU (9–2)	West Virginia (10–1)	Dayton (11–1)	Stanford (12–2)	Clemson (13–3)	Drake (16–1)	Texas A&M (16–4)	St. Mary's (18–3)	Purdue (19–5)	Louisville (20–6)	St. Mary's (23–4)	Gonzaga (23–6)	BYU (25–6)	Davidson (26–6)	Drake (28–5)	23.
24.	North Carolina State	Kansas State (2–0)	Florida (4–0)	USC (5–1)	Arizona (5–2)	St. Mary's (7–0)	Xavier (8–2)	Mississippi (11–0)	St. Mary's (12–1)	Arizona (10–4)	Miami (FL) (14–1)	St. Mary's (15–2)	Kansas State (14–4)	Kansas State (15–5)	Pittsburgh (18–5)	Marquette (18–6)	Kent State (23–5)	BYU (23–6)	Marquette (22–8)	Indiana (25–7) т	Villanova (22-13)	24.
25.	Villanova	Syracuse (0–0)	Davidson (1–1)	Xavier (4–1)	Vanderbilt (7–0)	BYU (7–2)	Stanford (8–1)	Rhode Island (11–1)	Wisconsin (10–2)	Xavier (12–3)	Arizona State (13–2)	Clemson (14–4)	Mississippi State (14–5)	Pittsburgh (17–5)	Marquette (16–6)	Kansas State (18–6)	BYU (21–6)	Mississippi State (20–8)	Davidson (25–6)	Marquette (24–9) т	Vanderbilt (26–8)	25.
	Preseason Nov 5	Week 1 Nov 12	Week 2 Nov 19	Week 3 Nov 26	Week 4 Dec 3	Week 5 Dec 10	Week 6 Dec 17	Week 7 Dec 24	Week 8 Dec 31	Week 9 Jan 7	Week 10 Jan 14	Week 11 Jan 21	Week 12 Jan 28	Week 13 Feb 4	Week 14 Feb 11	Week 15 Feb 18	Week 16 Feb 25	Week 17 Mar 3	Week 18 Mar 11	Week 19 Mar 17	Week 20 Final	
		Dropped: USC (0–1); Kentucky (1–1)	Dropped: Arizona (1–1); Arkansas (3–1); Stanford (4–1); NC State (1–1)	Dropped: Kansas State (5–1); Syracuse (4–1); Florida (5–1); Davidson (2–2)	Dropped: Southern Illinois (3–2); USC (6–2)	Dropped: Wisconsin (6–2)	Dropped: Louisville (5–3); St. Mary's (7–1)	Dropped: Gonzaga (9–3); Oregon (8–3); Xavier (8–3)	Dropped: Miami (FL) (12–1); BYU (10–3); West Virginia (10–2)	Dropped: St. Mary's (12–2)	Dropped: Stanford (13–3); Arizona (11–5)	Dropped: Rhode Island (15–3); Miami (FL) (14–3); Arizona State (14–3)	Dropped: Villanova (13–5); Dayton (14–4); Clemson (15–5)	Dropped: Mississippi (16–4); Mississippi State (14–7)	Dropped: Florida (19–5)	Dropped: Pittsburgh (19–6)	Dropped: Kansas State (18–8); Texas A&M (20–7)	Dropped: Kent State (23–6); St. Mary's (24–5)	Dropped: Mississippi State (21–9)	Dropped: Gonzaga (25–7); BYU (27–7)	Dropped: Connecticut (24–9); Clemson (24–10); Indiana (25–8)	
