= Bill Grier =

American college basketball coach (born 1963)

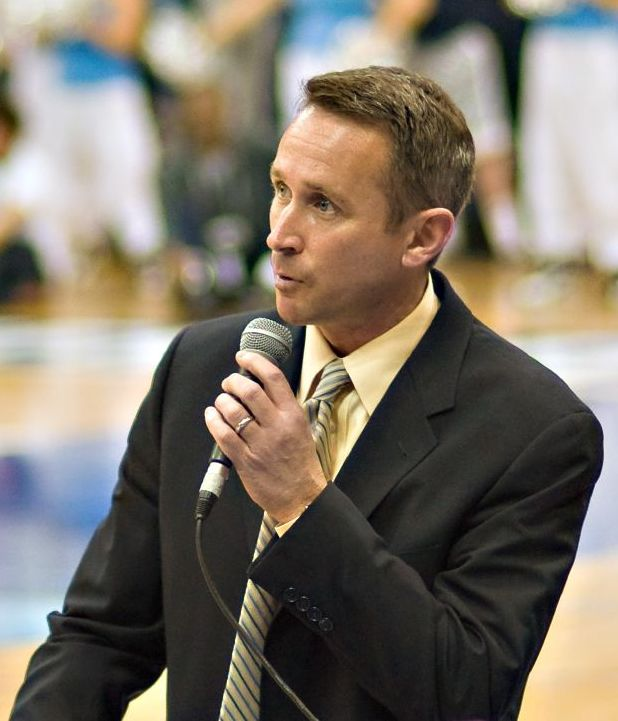

Current position
- Title: Assistant coach
- Team: Colorado
- Conference: Big 12

Biographical details
- Born: October 19, 1963 (age 63); Silverton, Oregon, U.S.
- Education: Oregon

Playing career
- 1981–1982: Central Oregon CC
- 1982–1983: Southwestern Oregon CC

Coaching career (HC unless noted)
- 1986–1990: Cottage Grove HS (asst.)
- 1990–1991: Creswell HS
- 1991–2007: Gonzaga (asst.)
- 2007–2015: San Diego
- 2015–2016: Oklahoma State (asst.)
- 2016–present: Colorado (asst.)

Head coaching record
- Overall: 117–144 (.448)
- Tournaments: 1–1 (NCAA Division I); 2–1 (CIT)

Accomplishments and honors

Championships
- WCC tournament (2008)

William Theodore Grier (born October 19, 1963) is an American college basketball coach. He is currently an assistant coach at the University of Colorado and was formerly the head men's basketball coach at the University of San Diego.

== Early career ==
Grier was born in Silverton, Oregon, and he attended Cottage Grove High School in Cottage Grove, Oregon. He began coaching freshman basketball at his alma mater in 1986. He left to attend Central Oregon Community College and Southwestern Oregon Community College, where he played basketball, before earning a Bachelor of Science degree from the University of Oregon in 1990.

== College coaching career ==
Grier coached at Creswell High School in Creswell, Oregon before becoming an assistant college coach at Gonzaga University in 1992. He remained at Gonzaga until 2007, when he was hired to coach at USD. In his first season, Grier coached the Toreros to an upset of Gonzaga in the finals of the WCC tournament. The Toreros received a #13 seed in the 2008 NCAA men's basketball tournament and upset #4 seed Connecticut in the first round.

In April 2008, Grier explored the opening at Oregon State but decided to remain at San Diego. On March 16, 2015, the University of San Diego announced they parted ways with Grier.

On August 24, 2015, Grier was announced as an assistant at Oklahoma State University, pending approved by the board of trustees.

On March 28, 2016, Grier was hired as an assistant coach for the University of Colorado under Buffaloes head coach Tad Boyle.

== Head coaching record ==
Record table
Season	Team	Overall	Conference	Standing	Postseason
San Diego Toreros (West Coast Conference) (2007–2015)
2007–08	San Diego	22–14	11–3	3rd	NCAA Division I Second Round
2008–09	San Diego	16–16	6–8	5th	
2009–10	San Diego	11–21	3–11	T–6th	
2010–11	San Diego	6–24	2–12	T–7th	
2011–12	San Diego	13–18	7–9	6th	
2012–13	San Diego	16–18	7–9	T–5th	
2013–14	San Diego	18–17	7–11	6th	CIT Quarterfinals
2014–15	San Diego	15–16	8–10	5th	
San Diego:		117–144 (.448)	51–73 (.411)		
Total:		117–144 (.448)			
National champion Postseason invitational champion Conference regular season champion Conference regular season and conference tournament champion Division regular season champion Division regular season and conference tournament champion Conference tournament champion
