= Greg Graham (basketball coach) =

American basketball coach

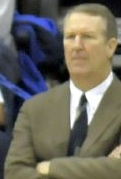
- Graham as Boise State head coach in 2008.

Biographical details
- Born: May 19, 1955 (age 71); Louisville, Ohio, U.S.

Playing career
- 1973–1977: Oregon
- Position: Guard

Coaching career (HC unless noted)
- 1978–1979: Marist Catholic HS (asst.)
- 1979–1982: Louisville HS
- 1982–1983: Oregon (asst.)
- 1983–1984: New Mexico (asst.)
- 1984–1985: Western New Mexico
- 1985–1989: San Jose State (asst.)
- 1989–1992: San Diego State (asst.)
- 1992–1997: Saint Mary's (asst.)
- 1997–2002: Oregon (asst.)
- 2002–2010: Boise State
- 2011–2014: Bradley (asst.)
- 2014–2017: Washington State (asst.)

Head coaching record
- Overall: 160–117
- Tournaments: 0–1 (NCAA Division I); 2–1 (NIT); 0–1 (CBI)

Accomplishments and honors

Championships
- WAC tournament (2008); WAC regular season (2008)

Awards
- WAC Coach of the Year (2008)

Don Gregory Graham (born May 19, 1955) is an American college basketball coach. He is a former head men's basketball coach at Boise State University.

== Early life and college playing career ==
Graham was born in Louisville, Ohio and graduated from Louisville High School in 1973. After high school, Graham attended the University of Oregon (UO) in Eugene and played at guard on the Oregon Ducks men's basketball team from 1973 to 1977 under Dick Harter. As a senior, Graham was team captain and was the team's leading scorer with 21.7 points per game, as well as the leading rebounder (9.8). Graham graduated from the University of Oregon College of Arts and Sciences in 1978 with a degree in biology.

== Coaching career ==
=== High school (1978–1982) ===
Graham stayed in Eugene after graduating from UO to be assistant coach at Marist Catholic High School for one season. In 1979, Graham became varsity boys' basketball head coach at alma mater Louisville High School and enrolled in graduate school at the University of Dayton. Graham left Louisville in 1982, the year he completed a master's degree in educational administration at Dayton.

=== Early college coaching career (1982–1984) ===
Graham returned to the University of Oregon to be assistant coach under Jim Haney for the 1982–83 season. The following season, Graham became an assistant at New Mexico under Gary Colson, in a season where New Mexico made the NIT.

=== Western New Mexico (1984–1985) ===
Graham had his first head coaching job at Western New Mexico in the 1984–85 season. He led Western New Mexico to an 18–5 record during a season on probation by the Rocky Mountain Athletic Conference and NAIA.

=== Later college assistant coaching career (1985–2002) ===
From 1985 to 1989, Graham was assistant coach at San Jose State under Bill Berry. Graham then moved to San Diego State to coach under Jim Brandenburg, from 1989 to 1992.

Graham then was an assistant coach at Saint Mary's from 1992 to 1997 in the first of several assistant coaching stints under Ernie Kent. Graham helped Saint Mary's win the West Coast Conference regular season and qualify for the NCAA tournament by virtue of winning the WCC tournament.

In 1997, Graham had his second stint as assistant coach at Oregon and second assistant coaching job under Ernie Kent. In five seasons with Graham as assistant coach, Oregon made the 1999 NIT semifinals and 2000 NCAA tournament, as well as the Pac-10 regular season championship and Elite Eight round of the NCAA tournament in 2002.

=== Boise State (2002–2010) ===
Athletic director Gene Bleymaier hired Graham to be head coach at Boise State in 2002. In eight seasons, Graham had a 142–112 record at Boise State and led Boise State to a berth in the 2004 NIT, 2008 NCAA tournament and 2009 CBI. For leading Boise State to the NCAA Tournament, the Western Athletic Conference named Graham "Coach of the Year" in 2008.

In 2010, after a 15–17 season, Bleymaier fired Graham and stated: "We appreciate everything that Coach Graham and his staff have contributed to Boise State the past eight years. We felt that in the best interest of the program we needed to make a change."

=== Assistant coaching after Boise State (2011–2017) ===
In 2011, Graham became an assistant coach again, this time at Bradley under Geno Ford.

After three seasons at Bradley, Graham became an assistant coach at Washington State in 2014, for his third coaching stint under Ernie Kent. He was let go following the 2017 season.

== Head coaching record ==
Record table
Season	Team	Overall	Conference	Standing	Postseason
Western New Mexico Mustangs (Rocky Mountain Athletic Conference) (1984–1985)
1984–85	Western New Mexico	18–5	0–0*		Ineligible*
Western New Mexico:		18–5	0–0		
Boise State Broncos (Western Athletic Conference) (2002–2010)
2002–03	Boise State	13–16	7–11	8th	
2003–04	Boise State	23–10	12–6	T–3rd	NIT second round
2004–05	Boise State	16–18	6–12	8th	
2005–06	Boise State	14–15	6–10	7th	
2006–07	Boise State	17–14	8–8	T–5th	
2007–08	Boise State	25–9	12–4	T–1st	NCAA Division I Round of 64
2008–09	Boise State	19–13	9–7	T–3rd	CBI first round
2009–10	Boise State	15–17	5–11	8th	
Boise State:		142–112	65–69		
Total:		160–117			
National champion Postseason invitational champion Conference regular season champion Conference regular season and conference tournament champion Division regular season champion Division regular season and conference tournament champion Conference tournament champion

*Due to probation from the conference, Western New Mexico had an official 0–0 conference record.
