= 2007–08 Saint Mary's Gaels men's basketball team =

American college basketball season

2007–08 Saint Mary's Gaels men's basketball

NCAA tournament, first round
- Conference: West Coast Conference
- Record: 25–7 (12–2 WCC)
- Head coach: Randy Bennett
- Assistant coaches: Kyle Smith; David Patrick; Mark Campbell
- Home arena: McKeon Pavilion

2007–08 West Coast Conference men's basketball standings
	Conf.				Overall
Team	W		L	PCT	W		L	PCT
No. 20 Gonzaga	13	–	1	.929	25	–	8	.758
Saint Mary's	12	–	2	.857	25	–	7	.781
San Diego †	11	–	3	.786	22	–	14	.611
Santa Clara	6	–	8	.429	15	–	16	.484
San Francisco	5	–	9	.357	10	–	21	.323
Pepperdine	4	–	10	.286	11	–	21	.344
Portland	3	–	11	.214	9	–	22	.290
Loyola Marymount	2	–	12	.143	5	–	26	.161
† 2008 WCC tournament winner Rankings from AP Poll

The 2007–08 Saint Mary's Gaels men's basketball team represented Saint Mary's College of California in the 2007–08 college basketball season, coached by Randy Bennett for the 7th consecutive year. The Gaels competed in the West Coast Conference and played their home games at the McKeon Pavilion. They finished conference play with a record of 12–2 to place second. They reached the semifinal round of the 2008 West Coast Conference men's basketball tournament, but received an at-large bid to the 2008 NCAA Division I men's basketball tournament where they entered as the No. 10 seed South Region. The Gaels were beaten by No. 7 seed Miami (FL) in the opening round to end their season 25–7.

== Roster ==
2007–08 Saint Mary's Gaels men's basketball team
Players
Coaches

Pos.	#	Name	Height	Weight	Year	Previous school	Hometown
F	12	Lucas Walker	6 ft 8 in (2.03 m)	225 lb (102 kg)	RS Jr	Montana State–Billings	Launceston, Australia
G	13	Patty Mills	6 ft 0 in (1.83 m)	180 lb (82 kg)	Fr	Lake Ginninderra College	Canberra, Australia
G	24	Todd Golden	6 ft 3 in (1.91 m)	180 lb (82 kg)	Sr	Sunnyslope HS	Phoenix, Arizona
G	32	Mickey McConnell	6 ft 0 in (1.83 m)	190 lb (86 kg)	Fr	Dobson HS	Mesa, AZ
C	50	Omar Samhan	6 ft 11 in (2.11 m)	260 lb (118 kg)	So	San Ramon HS	San Ramon, CA

Head coach

- Randy Bennett

Assistant coach(es)

Legend

- (C) Team captain
- (S) Suspended
- (I) Ineligible
- (W) Walk-on
- Injured
- Current redshirt

== Schedule and results ==
- All times are Pacific

Date time, TV	Rank^{#}	Opponent^{#}	Result	Record	Site (attendance) city, state
Non-conference regular season
Nov 9, 2007*		Sonoma State	W 82–57	1–0	McKeon Pavilion; Moraga, California
Nov 10, 2007*		Drake	W 72–66	2–0	McKeon Pavilion; Moraga, California
Nov 13, 2007*		Cal State Bakersfield	W 94–66	3–0	McKeon Pavilion; Moraga, California
Nov 20, 2007*		No. 12 Oregon	W 99–87	4–0	McKeon Pavilion; Moraga, California
Nov 24, 2007*		Nicholls State	W 84–63	5–0	McKeon Pavilion; Moraga, California
Dec 1, 2007*		Seton Hall	W 85–70	6–0	McKeon Pavilion; Moraga, California
Dec 8, 2007*		vs. San Diego State	W 69–64	7–0	Honda Center; Anaheim, California
Dec 11, 2007*	No. 24	at Southern Illinois	L 56–71	7–1	SIU Arena; Carbondale, Illinois
Dec 20, 2007*		vs. Tulane	W 64–57	8–1	Stan Sheriff Center; Honolulu, Hawaii
Dec 21, 2007*		vs. East Tennessee State	W 89–65	9–1	Stan Sheriff Center; Honolulu, Hawaii
Dec 22, 2007*		vs. Ohio	W 70–63	10–1	Stan Sheriff Center; Honolulu, Hawaii
Dec 28, 2007*		Howard	W 97–48	11–1	McKeon Pavilion; Moraga, California
Dec 29, 2007*		Cal State Fullerton	W 69–59	12–1	McKeon Pavilion; Moraga, California
Jan 5, 2008*		at No. 14 Texas	L 62–81	12–2	Frank Erwin Center; Austin, Texas
Jan 8, 2008*		at Fresno State	W 77–68	13–2	Save Mart Center; Fresno, California
WCC regular season
Jan 12, 2008		Santa Clara	W 76–45	14–2 (1–0)	McKeon Pavilion; Moraga, California
Jan 19, 2008		Pepperdine	W 79–74	15–2 (2–0)	McKeon Pavilion; Moraga, California
Jan 21, 2008		Loyola Marymount	W 87–55	16–2 (3–0)	McKeon Pavilion; Moraga, California
Jan 26, 2008		at San Francisco	W 79–57	17–2 (4–0)	War Memorial Gymnasium; San Francisco, California
Jan 28, 2008	No. 21	at San Diego	L 55–63	17–3 (4–1)	Jenny Craig Pavilion; San Diego, California
Feb 2, 2008	No. 21	Portland	W 86–49	18–3 (5–1)	McKeon Pavilion; Moraga, California
Feb 4, 2008	No. 25	Gonzaga	W 89–85 ^{OT}	19–3 (6–1)	McKeon Pavilion; Moraga, California
Feb 8, 2008*	No. 25	San Francisco	W 76–51	20–3 (7–1)	McKeon Pavilion; Moraga, California
Feb 11, 2008	No. 25	at Santa Clara	W 54–50	21–3 (8–1)	Leavey Center; Santa Clara, California
Feb 16, 2008	No. 25	at Loyola Marymount	W 80–49	22–3 (9–1)	Gersten Pavilion; Los Angeles, California
Feb 18, 2008	No. 23	at Pepperdine	W 100–64	23–3 (10–1)	Firestone Fieldhouse; Malibu, California
Feb 23, 2008*	No. 23	Kent State	L 57–65	23–4	McKeon Pavilion; Moraga, California
Feb 25, 2008	No. 25	San Diego	W 61–54	24–4 (11–1)	McKeon Pavilion; Moraga, California
Mar 1, 2008	No. 25	at No. 24 Gonzaga	L 76–88	24–5 (11–2)	McCarthey Athletic Center; Spokane, Washington
Mar 3, 2008		at Portland	W 64–50	25–5 (12–2)	Chiles Center; Portland, Oregon
WCC tournament
Mar 9, 2008*	(2)	at (3) San Diego; Semifinals	L 69–75 ^{2OT}	25–6	Jenny Craig Pavilion; San Diego, California
NCAA tournament
Mar 21, 2008*	(10 S)	vs. (7 S) Miami (FL); First Round	L 64–78	25–7	Alltel Arena; North Little Rock, Arkansas
*Non-conference game. ^{#}Rankings from AP poll. (#) Tournament seedings in parentheses. S=South.
