= 2007–08 Western Kentucky Hilltoppers basketball team =

American college basketball season

2007–08 Western Kentucky Hilltoppers basketball

Sun Belt Conference tournament Champion Sun Belt Conference East Division Co-Champion

NCAA Tournament, Sweet Sixteen
- Conference: Sun Belt Conference
- East Division

Ranking
- Coaches: No. 22
- Record: 29–7 (16–2 Sun Belt)
- Head coach: Darrin Horn
- Home arena: E. A. Diddle Arena

2007–08 Sun Belt Conference men's basketball standings
	Conf.				Overall
Team	W		L	PCT	W		L	PCT
East
South Alabama	16	–	2	.889	26	–	7	.788
Western Kentucky †	16	–	2	.889	29	–	7	.806
Middle Tennessee	11	–	7	.611	17	–	15	.531
Florida Atlantic	8	–	10	.444	15	–	18	.455
Florida International	6	–	12	.333	9	–	20	.310
Troy	4	–	14	.222	12	–	19	.387
West
Arkansas-Little Rock	11	–	7	.611	20	–	11	.645
Louisiana–Lafayette	11	–	7	.611	15	–	15	.500
North Texas	10	–	8	.556	20	–	11	.645
New Orleans	8	–	10	.444	19	–	13	.594
Denver	7	–	11	.389	11	–	19	.367
Arkansas State	5	–	13	.278	10	–	20	.333
Louisiana–Monroe	4	–	14	.222	10	–	21	.323
† 2008 Sun Belt Conference tournament winner Rankings from AP Poll

The 2007–08 Western Kentucky Hilltoppers men's basketball team represented Western Kentucky University during the 2007–08 NCAA Division I men's basketball season. The Hilltoppers were led by head coach Darrin Horn and by future NBA player Courtney Lee. They were members of the East Division of the Sun Belt Conference and finished the season 29–7 with a 16–2 record in Sun Belt play to finish tied for first in the East Division. The team won the Sun Belt Basketball tournament and earned the conference's automatic bid to the NCAA tournament, where they advanced to the Sweet Sixteen. Western Kentucky finished ranked 22nd in the postseason ESPN/USA Today Poll. Lee was SBC Player of the year and was joined by Tyrone Brazelton on the All SBC team. Jeremy Evans was SBC Tournament Most Valuable Player, Lee and Brazelton also made the All-Tournament team. Brazelton was named to the NCAA Tournament All-Region Team.

== Schedule ==
Date time, TV	Rank^{#}	Opponent^{#}	Result	Record	Site city, state
Regular season
11/09/2007*		Kennesaw State	W 96–61	1–0	E. A. Diddle Arena (6,271); Bowling Green, KY
11/13/2007*		Kentucky Wesleyan	W 88–67	2–0	E. A. Diddle Arena (4,848); Bowling Green, KY
11/17/2007*		Murray State	W 87–63	3–0	E. A. Diddle Arena (5,566); Bowling Green, KY
11/22/2007*		vs. No. 14 Gonzaga; Great Alaska Shootout	L 71–74	3–1	Sullivan Arena (8,383); Anchorage, AK
11/23/2007*		at Alaska Anchorage; Great Alaska Shootout	W 71–67	4–1	Sullivan Arena (6,904); Anchorage, AK
11/23/2007*		vs. Michigan; Great Alaska Shootout	W 73–69	5–1	Sullivan Arena (7,043); Anchorage, AK
12/01/2007*		at Northern Arizona	L 61–64	5–2	Walkup Skydome (1,269); Flagstaff, AZ
12/5/2007*		Nebraska	W 69–62 ^{OT}	6–2	E. A. Diddle Arena (5,809); Bowling Green, KY
12/8/2007*		at Eastern Kentucky	W 77–60	7–2	Alumni Coliseum (4,900); Richmond, VA
12/15/2007*		vs. No. 11 Tennessee; Sun Belt Classic	L 82–88	7–3	Sommet Center (18,071); Nashville, TN
12/18/2007*		North Carolina Central	W 84–53	8–3	E. A. Diddle Arena (3,879); Bowling Green, KY
12/22/2007*		at Southern Illinois	L 78–88	8–4	Banterra Center (6,010); Carbondale, IL
12/29/2007		at Troy	W 94–90	9–4 (1–0)	Sartain Hall (1,932); Troy, AL
01/2/2008		Middle Tennessee	W 62–51	10–4 (2–0)	E. A. Diddle Arena (4,186); Bowling Green, KY
1/5/2008		at South Alabama	L 61–65	10–5 (2–1)	Mitchell Center (6,783); Mobile, AL
01/10/2008		at ULM	W 71–44	11–5 (3–1)	Fant–Ewing Coliseum (1,610); Monroe, LA
01/12/2008		FIU	W 76–60	12–5 (4–1)	E. A. Diddle Arena (5,071); Bowling Green, KY
01/16/2008		Florida Atlantic	W 80–62	13–5 (5–1)	E. A. Diddle Arena (4,291); Bowling Green, KY
01/19/2008		at Louisiana–Lafayette	W 69–66	14–5 (6–1)	Cajundome (6,190); Lafayette, LA
01/23/2008		at New Orleans	W 73–55	15–5 (7–1)	Lakefront Arena (1,099); New Orleans, LA
01/27/2008		Arkansas State	W 77–68	16–5 (8–1)	E. A. Diddle Arena (6,109); Bowling Green, KY
1/31/2008		Arkansas–Little Rock	W 71–47	17–5 (9–1)	E. A. Diddle Arena (5,022); Bowling Green, KY
02/2/2008		Denver	W 78–64	18–5 (10–1)	E. A. Diddle Arena (6,567); Bowling Green, KY
02/7/2008; 7:00 pm		at North Texas	W 94–84	19–5 (11–1)	The Super Pit (3,246); Denton, TX
2/13/2008		Troy	W 92–57	20–5 (12–1)	E. A. Diddle Arena (5,803); Bowling Green, KY
02/16/2008		at Middle Tennessee	W 71–66	21–5 (13–1)	Murphy Center (5,307); Murfreesboro, TN
02/21/2008		South Alabama	L 64–69	21–6 (13–2)	E. A. Diddle Arena (7,718); Bowling Green, KY
02/23/2008		ULM	W 86–75	22–6 (14–2)	E. A. Diddle Arena (6,750); Bowling Green, KY
2/27/2008		at FIU	W 69–54	23–6 (15–2)	Ocean Bank Convocation Center (709); University Park, FL
3/1/2008		at Florida Atlantic	W 88–78	24–6 (16–2)	FAU Arena (802); Boca Raton, FL
2008 Sun Belt Conference men's basketball tournament
03/09/2008; 9:15 pm	(3)	vs. (6) North Texas; Second Round	W 84–70	25–6	Mitchell Center (4,734); Mobile, AL
03/10/2008	(3)	vs. (2) Arkansas–Little Rock; Semifinals	W 70–55	26–6	Mitchell Center (6,397); Mobile, AL
03/11/2008	(3)	vs. (4) Middle Tennessee; Championship	W 67–57	27–6	Mitchell Center (5,234); Mobile, AL
2008 NCAA Division I men's basketball tournament
03/21/2008*	(12 W)	vs. (5 W) No. 14 Drake; First Round	W 101–99 ^{OT}	28–6	St. Pete Times Forum (15,920); Tampa, FL
03/23/2008*	(12 W)	vs. (13 W) San Diego; Second Round	W 72–63	29–6	St. Pete Times Forum (14,504); Tampa, FL
03/27/2008*	(12 W)	vs. (1 W) No. 3 UCLA; Sweet Sixteen	L 78–88	29–7	US Airways Center (18,103); Phoenix, AZ
*Non-conference game. ^{#}Rankings from AP Poll (W) during NCAA Tournament is seed with Region. (#) Tournament seedings in parentheses. All times are in Central Time.
