= 2007–08 Idaho Vandals men's basketball team =

American college basketball season

2007–08 Idaho Vandals men's basketball
- Conference: Western Athletic Conference
- Record: 8–21 (5–11 WAC)
- Head coach: George Pfeifer (2nd season)
- Home arena: Cowan Spectrum

2007–08 WAC men's basketball standings
	Conf.				Overall
Team	W		L	PCT	W		L	PCT
Utah State	12	–	4	.750	24	–	11	.686
Nevada	12	–	4	.750	21	–	12	.636
New Mexico State	12	–	4	.750	21	–	14	.600
Boise State †	12	–	4	.750	25	–	9	.735
Hawaii	7	–	9	.438	11	–	19	.367
Idaho	5	–	11	.313	8	–	21	.276
Fresno State	5	–	11	.313	13	–	19	.406
San Jose State	4	–	12	.250	13	–	19	.406
Louisiana Tech	3	–	13	.188	6	–	24	.200
† Conference tournament winner Rankings from AP poll

The 2007–08 Idaho Vandals men's basketball team represented the University of Idaho during the 2007–08 NCAA Division I men's basketball season. Members of the Western Athletic Conference (WAC), the Vandals were led by second-year head coach George Pfeifer and played their home games on campus at Cowan Spectrum in Moscow, Idaho.

The Vandals were 8–20 overall in the regular season and 5–11 in conference play, tied for sixth in the standings. They met host New Mexico State in the quarterfinals of the conference tournament and lost by twenty points.

Pfeiefer was fired days later, succeeded by Don Verlin, an assistant at Utah State under Stew Morrill.

== Postseason result ==
Date time, TV	Opponent	Result	Record	Site (attendance) city, state
WAC Tournament
Thu, March 13	at (3) New Mexico State; Quarterfinal	L 53–73	8–21	Pan American Center; Las Cruces, New Mexico
*Non-conference game. ^{#}Rankings from AP poll. (#) Tournament seedings in parentheses. All times are in Pacific time.
