= 2008 WAC men's basketball tournament =

- 2008 Tournament logo
- Classification: Division I
- Season: 2007–08
- Teams: 9
- Site: Pan American Center; Las Cruces, New Mexico
- Champions: Boise State (1st title)
- Winning coach: Greg Graham (1st title)
- MVP: Reggie Larry (Boise State)

2007–08 WAC men's basketball standings
	Conf.				Overall
Team	W		L	PCT	W		L	PCT
Utah State	12	–	4	.750	24	–	11	.686
Nevada	12	–	4	.750	21	–	12	.636
New Mexico State	12	–	4	.750	21	–	14	.600
Boise State †	12	–	4	.750	25	–	9	.735
Hawaii	7	–	9	.438	11	–	19	.367
Idaho	5	–	11	.313	8	–	21	.276
Fresno State	5	–	11	.313	13	–	19	.406
San Jose State	4	–	12	.250	13	–	19	.406
Louisiana Tech	3	–	13	.188	6	–	24	.200
† Conference tournament winner Rankings from AP poll

The 2008 WAC men's basketball tournament, a part of the 2007–08 NCAA Division I men's basketball season, was held March 11–15 at the Pan American Center in Las Cruces, New Mexico.

Four teams finished the season at 12–4 in the conference standings, and all advanced to the semifinals. In the championship game, Boise State defeated host New Mexico State in triple overtime and received the Western Athletic Conference's automatic bid to the NCAA tournament. It was the Broncos' first NCAA appearance in fourteen years, when they won the Big Sky tournament (as a fifth-seed).

Boise State was seeded fourteenth in the East region and lost to Louisville in the first round.

Utah State made the National Invitation Tournament (NIT), but lost a road game in the first round.

== Tournament ==
=== Bracket ===
First round Tuesday, March 11
8	San Jose State	64
9	Louisiana Tech	62

Quarterfinals; Thursday, March 13
1	Utah State	85
8	San Jose State	65
4	Boise State	80
5	Hawaii	74
2	Nevada	64
7	Fresno State	57
3	New Mexico State	73
6	Idaho	53

Semifinals; Friday, March 14
1	Utah State	78
4	Boise State	88
2	Nevada	75
3	New Mexico State	83

Final; Saturday, March 15
4	Boise State	107
3	New Mexico State	102^{3OT}
