= 2007–08 Boise State Broncos men's basketball team =

American college basketball season

2007–08 Boise State Broncos men's basketball

WAC tournament champions WAC Regular season co-champions

NCAA tournament, First round
- Conference: Western Athletic Conference
- Record: 25–9 (12–4 WAC)
- Head coach: Greg Graham (6th season)
- Assistant coaches: James Bailey; Andy McClouskey; Tim Cleary
- Home arena: Taco Bell Arena

2007–08 WAC men's basketball standings
	Conf.				Overall
Team	W		L	PCT	W		L	PCT
Utah State	12	–	4	.750	24	–	11	.686
Nevada	12	–	4	.750	21	–	12	.636
New Mexico State	12	–	4	.750	21	–	14	.600
Boise State †	12	–	4	.750	25	–	9	.735
Hawaii	7	–	9	.438	11	–	19	.367
Idaho	5	–	11	.313	8	–	21	.276
Fresno State	5	–	11	.313	13	–	19	.406
San Jose State	4	–	12	.250	13	–	19	.406
Louisiana Tech	3	–	13	.188	6	–	24	.200
† Conference tournament winner Rankings from AP poll

The 2007–08 Boise State Broncos men's basketball team represented Boise State University in the 2007–08 college basketball season. This was head coach Greg Graham's sixth season at Boise State. The Broncos competed in the Western Athletic Conference and played their home games at the Taco Bell Arena. Boise State finished the season 25–9, 12–4 in WAC play and won the 2008 WAC men's basketball tournament to receive the conference’s automatic bid to the NCAA tournament as No. 14 seed in the East region. The team was beaten by No. 3 seed Louisville in the opening round, 79–61.

== Roster ==
2007–08 Boise State Broncos men's basketball team
Players
Coaches

Pos.	#	Name	Height	Weight	Year	Hometown
F	22	Matt Nelson	6 ft 9 in (2.06 m)	232 lb (105 kg)	Sr	Issaquah, Washington
F	24	Reggie Larry	6 ft 6 in (1.98 m)	224 lb (102 kg)	Sr	Newark, New Jersey

Head coach

- Greg Graham

Assistant coach(es)

Legend

- (C) Team captain
- (S) Suspended
- (I) Ineligible
- (W) Walk-on
- Injured
- Current redshirt

Roster

== Schedule and results ==
Date time, TV	Rank^{#}	Opponent^{#}	Result	Record	Site (attendance) city, state
Regular season
Nov 9, 2007*		Utah Valley	W 73–72 ^{OT}	1–0	Taco Bell Arena (4,550); Boise, Idaho
Nov 13, 2007*		No. 9 Washington State	L 74–86	1–1	Taco Bell Arena (6,718); Boise, Idaho
Nov 16, 2007*		at Montana State	L 84–86	1–2	Worthington Arena (4,866); Havre, Montana
Nov 21, 2007*		Montana Tech	W 107–53	2–2	Taco Bell Arena (1,821); Boise, Idaho
Nov 24, 2007*		at Southern Utah	W 75–73 ^{OT}	3–2	Centrum (1,818); Cedar City, Utah
Nov 28, 2007*		San Diego	W 77–71	4–2	Taco Bell Arena (2,944); Boise, Idaho
Dec 1, 2007*		at San Francisco	W 91–81	5–2	War Memorial Gymnasium (1,331); San Francisco, California
Dec 5, 2007*		at Idaho State	W 93–61	6–2	Holt Arena (2,883); Pocatello, Idaho
Dec 8, 2007*		Loyola Marymount	L 74–76	6–3	Taco Bell Arena (5,236); Boise, Idaho
Dec 13, 2007*		at Utah Valley	W 87–77	7–3	McKay Events Center (2,332); Orem, Utah
Dec 22, 2007*		at Albany	W 74–68	8–3	SEFCU Arena (3,214); Albany, New York
Dec 29, 2007*		No. 20 BYU	W 73–70	9–3	Taco Bell Arena (8,779); Boise, Idaho
WAC Regular Season
Jan 2, 2008		San Jose State	W 78–63	10–3 (1–0)	Taco Bell Arena (3,984); Boise, Idaho
Jan 5, 2008		at Idaho	W 95–84	11–3 (2–0)	Cowan Spectrum (1,249); Moscow, Idaho
Jan 10, 2008		New Mexico State	L 73–76	11–4 (2–1)	Taco Bell Arena (7,054); Boise, Idaho
Jan 12, 2008		Louisiana Tech	W 81–66	12–4 (3–1)	Taco Bell Arena (4,709); Boise, Idaho
Jan 17, 2008		at Utah State	L 78–82	12–5 (3–2)	Dee Glen Smith Spectrum (10,116); Logan, Utah
Jan 19, 2008		at Nevada	W 95–80	13–5 (4–2)	Lawlor Events Center (8,609); Reno, Nevada
Jan 24, 2008		Hawaii	W 95–80	14–5 (5–2)	Taco Bell Arena (4,896); Boise, Idaho
Jan 28, 2008		at Fresno State	W 90–89 ^{OT}	15–5 (6–2)	Save Mart Center (10,399); Fresno, California
Feb 2, 2008		Idaho	W 78–64	16–5 (7–2)	Taco Bell Arena (8,492); Boise, Idaho
Feb 7, 2008		at Louisiana Tech	W 73–61	17–5 (8–2)	Thomas Assembly Center (1,139); Ruston, Louisiana
Feb 9, 2008		at New Mexico State	L 80–99	17–6 (8–3)	Pan American Center (6,443); Las Cruces, New Mexico
Feb 14, 2008		Nevada	W 77–68	18–6 (9–3)	Taco Bell Arena (5,244); Boise, Idaho
Feb 16, 2008		Fresno State	W 84–72	19–6 (10–3)	Taco Bell Arena (5,268); Boise, Idaho
Feb 20, 2008*		Cal State Bakersfield	W 81–56	20–6	Taco Bell Arena (3,220); Boise, Idaho
Feb 23, 2008*		Siena; ESPN BracketBusters	L 70–93	20–7	Taco Bell Arena (5,982); Boise, Idaho
Feb 28, 2008		at San Jose State	W 74–68	21–7 (11–3)	The Event Center (2,247); San Jose, California
Mar 1, 2008		at Hawaii	W 78–71	22–7 (12–3)	Stan Sheriff Center (7,243); Honolulu, Hawaii
Mar 6, 2008		Utah State	L 69–88	22–8 (12–4)	Taco Bell Arena (10,352); Boise, Idaho
WAC Tournament
Mar 13, 2008	(4)	vs. (5) Hawaii; Quarterfinals	W 80–74	23–8	Pan American Center (4,628); Las Cruces, New Mexico
Mar 14, 2008	(4)	vs. (1) Utah State; Semifinals	W 88–78	24–8	Pan American Center (9,893); Las Cruces, New Mexico
Mar 15, 2008	(4)	at (3) New Mexico State; Championship	W 107–102 ^{3OT}	25–8	Pan American Center (10,921); Las Cruces, New Mexico
2008 NCAA tournament
Mar 21, 2008	(14 E)	vs. (3 E) No. 13 Louisville; First Round	L 61–79	25–9	Birmingham-Jefferson Civic Center (14,315); Birmingham, Alabama
*Non-conference game. ^{#}Rankings from AP poll. (#) Tournament seedings in parentheses. E=East. All times are in Mountain.
