= 2007–08 San Diego Toreros men's basketball team =

American college basketball season

2007–08 San Diego Toreros men's basketball

WCC tournament champions

NCAA tournament, second round
- Conference: West Coast Conference
- Record: 22–14 (11–3 WCC)
- Head coach: Bill Grier (1st season)
- Home arena: Jenny Craig Pavilion

2007–08 West Coast Conference men's basketball standings
	Conf.				Overall
Team	W		L	PCT	W		L	PCT
No. 20 Gonzaga	13	–	1	.929	25	–	8	.758
Saint Mary's	12	–	2	.857	25	–	7	.781
San Diego †	11	–	3	.786	22	–	14	.611
Santa Clara	6	–	8	.429	15	–	16	.484
San Francisco	5	–	9	.357	10	–	21	.323
Pepperdine	4	–	10	.286	11	–	21	.344
Portland	3	–	11	.214	9	–	22	.290
Loyola Marymount	2	–	12	.143	5	–	26	.161
† 2008 WCC tournament winner Rankings from AP Poll

The 2007–08 San Diego Toreros men's basketball team represented the University of San Diego during the 2007–08 NCAA Division I men's basketball season. The Toreros were led by first-year head coach Bill Grier. They played their home games at the Jenny Craig Pavilion in San Diego, California, as members of the West Coast Conference. The Toreros finished the season 22–14, 11–3 in WCC play to finish in 3rd place. They won the WCC tournament to receive an automatic bid to the NCAA tournament as No. 13 seed in the West region. In the opening round, San Diego upset No. 4 seed Connecticut in overtime, but fell to No. 12 seed Western Kentucky in the round of 32.

== Roster ==
2007–08 San Diego Toreros men's basketball team
Players
Coaches

Pos.	#	Name	Height	Weight	Year	Previous school	Hometown
G	1	Brandon Johnson	6 ft 0 in (1.83 m)	200 lb (91 kg)	RS So	Willowridge	Houston, TX
G	11	Trumaine Johnson	6 ft 2 in (1.88 m)	180 lb (82 kg)	Fr	Kingwood	Houston, TX
F	21	Gyno Pomare	6 ft 8 in (2.03 m)	240 lb (109 kg)	RS Jr	El Camino	Oceanside, CA
F	22	Rob Jones	6 ft 6 in (1.98 m)	230 lb (104 kg)	Fr	Archbishop Riordan	San Francisco, CA
G	23	De'Jon Jackson	6 ft 2 in (1.88 m)	200 lb (91 kg)	So	Clovis West	Fresno, CA

Head coach

- Bill Grier (Oregon)

Assistant coach(es)

Legend

- (C) Team captain
- (S) Suspended
- (I) Ineligible
- (W) Walk-on
- Injured
- Current redshirt

Roster

== Schedule and results ==
Date time, TV	Rank^{#}	Opponent^{#}	Result	Record	High points	High rebounds	High assists	Site (attendance) city, state
Non-conference regular season
Nov 9, 2007*		at Hawaii	W 73–72	1–0	–	–	–	Stan Sheriff Center; Honolulu, Hawaii
Nov 12, 2007*		Cal State Monterey Bay	W 87–76	2–0	–	–	–	Jenny Craig Pavilion; San Diego, California
Nov 17, 2007*		UNLV	L 55–66	2–1	–	–	–	Jenny Craig Pavilion; San Diego, California
Nov 19, 2007*		San Diego State	L 64–69	2–2	–	–	–	Jenny Craig Pavilion; San Diego, California
Nov 22, 2007*		vs. USC; Anaheim Classic	L 50–60	2–3	–	–	–	Anaheim Convention Center; Anaheim, California
Nov 23, 2007*		vs. South Alabama; Anaheim Classic	L 55–77	2–4	–	–	–	Anaheim Convention Center; Anaheim, California
Nov 25, 2007*		vs. UC Irvine; Anaheim Classic	W 60–57	3–4	–	–	–	Anaheim Convention Center; Anaheim, California
Nov 28, 2007*		at Boise State	L 71–77	3–5	–	–	–	Taco Bell Arena; Boise, Idaho
Dec 2, 2007*		Hawaii	W 81–67	4–5	–	–	–	Jenny Craig Pavilion; San Diego, California
Dec 5, 2007*		San Jose State	W 60–40	5–5	–	–	–	Jenny Craig Pavilion; San Diego, California
Dec 8, 2007*		at New Mexico	L 47–57	5–6	–	–	–	The Pit; Albuquerque, New Mexico
Dec 12, 2007*		at Nevada	L 62–76	5–7	–	–	–	Lawlor Events Center; Reno, Nevada
Dec 15, 2007*		Stephen F. Austin	L 50–56	5–8	–	–	–	Jenny Craig Pavilion; San Diego, California
Dec 22, 2007*		Texas-San Antonio	W 69–54	6–8	–	–	–	Jenny Craig Pavilion; San Diego, California
Dec 29, 2007*		at Kentucky	W 81–72	7–8	–	–	–	Rupp Arena; Lexington, Kentucky
Dec 31, 2007*		at Marshall	L 60–76	7–9	–	–	–	Cam Henderson Center; Huntington, West Virginia
Jan 9, 2008*		Cal State Bakersfield	L 72–80	7–10	–	–	–	Jenny Craig Pavilion; San Diego, California
WCC regular season
Jan 12, 2008		San Francisco	W 46–41	8–10 (1–0)	–	–	–	Jenny Craig Pavilion; San Diego, California
Jan 19, 2008		at Gonzaga	L 70–80	8–11 (1–1)	–	–	–	McCarthey Athletic Center; Spokane, Washington
Jan 21, 2008		at Portland	W 64–61	9–11 (2–1)	–	–	–	Chiles Center; Portland, Oregon
Jan 26, 2008*		Santa Clara	W 53–51	10–11 (3–1)	–	–	–	Jenny Craig Pavilion; San Diego, California
Jan 28, 2008*		No. 21 Saint Mary's	W 63–55	11–11 (4–1)	–	–	–	Jenny Craig Pavilion; San Diego, California
Feb 2, 2008		at Loyola Marymount	W 72–48	12–11 (5–1)	–	–	–	Gersten Pavilion; Los Angeles, California
Feb 4, 2008		at Pepperdine	W 61–58	13–11 (6–1)	–	–	–	Firestone Fieldhouse; Malibu, California
Feb 11, 2008		at San Francisco	W 73–62	14–11 (7–1)	–	–	–	War Memorial Gymnasium; San Francisco, California
Feb 16, 2008		Portland	W 78–61	15–11 (8–1)	–	–	–	Jenny Craig Pavilion; San Diego, California
Feb 18, 2008		Gonzaga	L 55–59	15–12 (8–2)	–	–	–	Jenny Craig Pavilion; San Diego, California
Feb 23, 2008		at Santa Clara	W 66–62	16–12 (9–2)	–	–	–	Leavey Center; Santa Clara, California
Feb 25, 2008		at No. 25 Saint Mary's	L 54–61	16–13 (9–3)	–	–	–	McKeon Pavilion; Moraga, California
Mar 1, 2008		Pepperdine	W 77–73	17–13 (10–3)	–	–	–	Jenny Craig Pavilion; San Diego, California
Mar 3, 2008		Loyola Marymount	W 86–65	18–13 (11–3)	–	–	–	Jenny Craig Pavilion; San Diego, California
WCC tournament
Mar 8, 2008*	(3)	(6) Pepperdine; Quarterfinals	W 73–55	19–13	–	–	–	Jenny Craig Pavilion; San Diego, California
Mar 9, 2008*	(3)	(2) Saint Mary's; Semifinals	W 75–69 ^{2OT}	20–13	–	–	–	Jenny Craig Pavilion; San Diego, California
Mar 10, 2008*	(3)	(1) No. 20 Gonzaga; Championship Game	W 69–62	21–13	–	–	–	Jenny Craig Pavilion; San Diego, California
NCAA tournament
Mar 21, 2008*	(13 W)	vs. (4 W) No. 16 Connecticut; First Round	W 70–69 ^{OT}	22–13	22 – Pomare	6 – Jones	5 – T. Johnson	St. Pete Times Forum; Tampa, Florida
Mar 23, 2008*	(13 W)	vs. (12 W) Western Kentucky; Second Round	L 63–72	22–14	20 – Pomare	9 – Pomare	4 – B. Johnson	St. Pete Times Forum; Tampa, Florida
*Non-conference game. ^{#}Rankings from AP Poll. (#) Tournament seedings in parentheses. W=West. All times are in Pacific Time.
