= 2007–08 North Texas Mean Green men's basketball team =

American college basketball season

2007–08 North Texas Mean Green men's basketball
- Conference: Sun Belt Conference
- West
- Record: 20–11 (10–8 Sun Belt)
- Head coach: Johnny Jones (7th season)
- Home arena: Super Pit

2007–08 Sun Belt Conference men's basketball standings
	Conf.				Overall
Team	W		L	PCT	W		L	PCT
East
South Alabama	16	–	2	.889	26	–	7	.788
Western Kentucky †	16	–	2	.889	29	–	7	.806
Middle Tennessee	11	–	7	.611	17	–	15	.531
Florida Atlantic	8	–	10	.444	15	–	18	.455
Florida International	6	–	12	.333	9	–	20	.310
Troy	4	–	14	.222	12	–	19	.387
West
Arkansas-Little Rock	11	–	7	.611	20	–	11	.645
Louisiana–Lafayette	11	–	7	.611	15	–	15	.500
North Texas	10	–	8	.556	20	–	11	.645
New Orleans	8	–	10	.444	19	–	13	.594
Denver	7	–	11	.389	11	–	19	.367
Arkansas State	5	–	13	.278	10	–	20	.333
Louisiana–Monroe	4	–	14	.222	10	–	21	.323
† 2008 Sun Belt Conference tournament winner Rankings from AP Poll

The 2007–08 North Texas Mean Green men's basketball team (often referred to as "North Texas" or the "Mean Green") represents the University of North Texas in the 2007–08 college basketball season. The team is led by head coach Johnny Jones. In 2006–07, North Texas set a new school-record with 23 wins, also the Mean Green won its first Sun Belt Conference title and advanced for only the second time to the NCAA Division I men's basketball tournament. The Mean Green play their home games on campus at the Super Pit in Denton, Texas.

== Preseason ==
=== Recruiting ===
College recruiting information
Name	Hometown	School	Height	Weight	Commit date
Kedrick Hogans; PF	New Orleans, Louisiana	Edna Karr	6 ft 7 in (2.01 m)	195 lb (88 kg)	
Kedrick Hogans; PF	Recruit ratings: No ratings found				
Adam McCoy; SG	Mesa, Arizona	Mesa Community College	6 ft 4 in (1.93 m)	190 lb (86 kg)	
Adam McCoy; SG	Recruit ratings: No ratings found				
Ryan McCoy; PG	Midland, Texas	Midland College	6 ft 0 in (1.83 m)	160 lb (73 kg)	
Ryan McCoy; PG	Recruit ratings: Rivals:				
Tristan Thompson; SG	Wolfeboro, New Hampshire	Brewster Academy	6 ft 5 in (1.96 m)	185 lb (84 kg)	
Tristan Thompson; SG	Recruit ratings: Rivals:				
Josh White; PG	Baton Rouge, Louisiana	Christian Life Academy	5 ft 10 in (1.78 m)	167 lb (76 kg)	
Josh White; PG	Recruit ratings: Rivals:				
Overall recruit ranking:
Note: In many cases, Scout, Rivals, 247Sports, On3, and ESPN may conflict in their listings of height and weight.; In these cases, the average was taken. ESPN grades are on a 100-point scale.; Sources: "2007 Team Ranking". Rivals.

== Schedule ==
Date time, TV	Rank^{#}	Opponent^{#}	Result	Record	Site (attendance) city, state
Exhibition
Nov. 10, 2007*; 7:00 pm		Panhandle State	W 108–71	0–0	Super Pit (N/A); Denton, Texas
Regular season
Nov. 10, 2007*; 7:30 pm		Cameron	W 106–53	1–0	Super Pit (3,136); Denton, Texas
Nov. 14, 2007*; 7:00 pm		Oklahoma State	W 82–73	2–0	Super Pit (6,793); Denton, Texas
Nov. 17, 2007*; 2:00 pm		Indiana State	W 78–69	3–0	Super Pit (2,531); Denton, Texas
Nov. 21, 2007*; 7:00 pm		at UT-Arlington	L 64–72	3–1	Texas Hall (1,289); Arlington, Texas
Nov. 30, 2007*; 7:30 pm		vs. Western New Mexico; Lou Henson Classic	W 84–82	4–1	Pan American Center (382); Las Cruces, New Mexico
Dec. 1, 2007*; 9:30 pm		at New Mexico State; Lou Henson Classic	W 75–72	5–1	Pan American Center (2,626); Las Cruces, New Mexico
Dec. 5, 2007*; 8:00 pm		at No. 5 Texas	L 72–88	5–2	Frank Erwin Center (10,913); Austin, Texas
Dec. 8, 2007*; 2:00 pm		Hartford	W 105–97	6–2	Super Pit (2,157); Denton, Texas
Dec. 17, 2007*; 7:00 pm		Southern University	W 79–58	7–2	Super Pit (2,218); Denton, Texas
Dec. 20, 2007*; 7:00 pm		Centenary	W 67–54	8–2	Super Pit (1,826); Denton, Texas
Dec. 22, 2007; 5:00 pm		at Denver	L 59–63	8–3 (0–1)	Magness Arena (1,196); Denver, Colorado
Dec. 28, 2007*; 2:00 pm		Texas A&M International	W 97–70	9–3	Super Pit (2,231); Denton, Texas
Jan. 3, 2008; 7:30 pm		at Troy	L 88–91 ^{OT}	9–4 (0–2)	Trojan Arena (1,936); Troy, Alabama
Jan. 7, 2008; 7:00 pm		Louisiana-Monroe	W 78–57	10–4 (1–2)	Super Pit (1,667); Denton, Texas
Jan. 10, 2008; 7:05 pm		at Arkansas State	W 74–63	11–4 (2–2)	Convocation Center (3,097); Jonesboro, Arkansas
Jan. 12, 2008; 7:00 pm		Louisiana-Lafayette	W 72–65	12–4 (3–2)	Super Pit (3,453); Denton, Texas
Jan. 17, 2008; 7:00 pm		New Orleans	L 61–83	12–5 (3–3)	Super Pit (3,410); Denton, Texas
Jan. 17, 2008; 6:00 pm		at Florida Atlantic	L 81–86	12–6 (3–4)	FAU Arena (768); Boca Raton, Florida
Jan. 27, 2008; 2:00 pm		at Middle Tennessee	L 60–69	12–7 (3–5)	Murphy Center (2,852); Murfreesboro, Tennessee
Jan. 31, 2008; 7:00 pm		South Alabama	W 70–68	13–7 (4–5)	Super Pit (3,218); Denton, Texas
Feb. 2, 2008; 7:00 pm		Florida International	W 60–57	14–7 (5–5)	Super Pit (3,122); Denton, Texas
Feb. 7, 2008; 7:00 pm		Western Kentucky	L 84–94	14–8 (5–6)	Super Pit (3,246); Denton, Texas
Feb. 9, 2008; 7:00 pm		at Arkansas-Little Rock	L 82–84	14–9 (5–7)	Jack Stephens Center (4,834); Little Rock, Arkansas
Feb. 14, 2008; 7:00 pm		Denver	W 62–48	15–9 (6–7)	Super Pit (2,318); Denton, Texas
Feb. 16, 2008; 7:00 pm		Troy	W 90–64	16–9 (7–7)	Super Pit (2,834); Denton, Texas
Feb. 20, 2008; 7:30 pm		at Louisiana-Monroe	W 72–40	17–9 (8–7)	Fant–Ewing Coliseum (1,147); Monroe, Louisiana
Feb. 23, 2008; 7:00 pm		Arkansas State	W 82–77	18–9 (9–7)	Super Pit (5,237); Denton, Texas
Feb. 28, 2008; 7:05 pm		at Louisiana-Lafayette	L 58–63	18–10 (9–8)	Cajundome (3,684); Lafayette, Louisiana
Mar. 1, 2008; 7:00 pm		at New Orleans	W 79–77	19–10 (10–8)	Human Performance Center (1,022); New Orleans, Louisiana
2008 Sun Belt Conference men's basketball tournament
Mar. 5, 2008*; 7:00 pm	(6)	(11) Arkansas State; First Round	W 85–63	20–10	Super Pit (4,631); Denton, Texas
Mar. 8, 2008*; 9:15 pm	(6)	vs. (3) Western Kentucky; Second Round	L 70–84	20–11	Mitchell Center (4,734); Mobile, Alabama
*Non-conference game. ^{#}Rankings from Coaches Poll. (#) Tournament seedings in parentheses. All times are in Central Time.
