= 2007–08 Gonzaga Bulldogs men's basketball team =

American college basketball season

2007–08 Gonzaga Bulldogs men's basketball

WCC regular season champions

NCAA tournament, Round of 64
- Conference: West Coast Conference

Ranking
- Coaches: No. -
- AP: No. 20
- Record: 25–8 (13–1 WCC)
- Head coach: Mark Few (9th season)
- Assistant coaches: Leon Rice (9th season); Tommy Lloyd (7th season); Ray Giacoletti (1st season)
- Home arena: McCarthey Athletic Center

2007–08 West Coast Conference men's basketball standings
	Conf.				Overall
Team	W		L	PCT	W		L	PCT
No. 20 Gonzaga	13	–	1	.929	25	–	8	.758
Saint Mary's	12	–	2	.857	25	–	7	.781
San Diego †	11	–	3	.786	22	–	14	.611
Santa Clara	6	–	8	.429	15	–	16	.484
San Francisco	5	–	9	.357	10	–	21	.323
Pepperdine	4	–	10	.286	11	–	21	.344
Portland	3	–	11	.214	9	–	22	.290
Loyola Marymount	2	–	12	.143	5	–	26	.161
† 2008 WCC tournament winner Rankings from AP Poll

During the 2007–08 season, the Gonzaga Bulldogs men's basketball team, from Gonzaga University in Washington state, played in the West Coast Conference and the Great Alaska Shootout. The team won 25 matches and lost eight, but lost in the first round of the 2008 NCAA Division I men's basketball tournament.

== Preseason ==
Coach Mark Few hit the recruiting trail hard in the offseason, proclaiming it was "the best we've ever had here". He recruited sought-after forward Austin Daye, Junior College transfer Ira Brown, Robert Sacre (a 7-foot center from Vancouver, British Columbia, Canada) and Steven Gray, a prized point/shooting guard. Returning from a suspension were the team's leading scorer from the season before, Josh Heytvelt, and Theo Davis. The team entered the season ranked 14th in the AP Poll.

=== Departures ===
Name	Number	Pos.	Height	Weight	Year	Hometown	Reason for departure
Sean Mallon	32	F	6'9"	223	Senior (redshirt)	Spokane, WA	Graduated
Derek Raivio	5	G	6'3"	177	Senior	Vancouver, WA	Graduated
Pierre Marie Altidor-Cespedes	4	G	6'0"	182	Junior	Montreal, QC	Graduated; Transferred to Marshall
David Burgess	33	F	6'10"	270	Sophomore (redshirt)	Irvine, CA	Transferred to Azusa Pacific
Jordan Mast	13	G	6'2"	180	Freshman (redshirt)	Hillsboro, OR	Left Team

=== Incoming transfers ===
Name	Pos.	Height	Weight	Year	Hometown	Previous school	Years remaining	Date eligible
Ira Brown	F	6'4"	235	Junior	Conroe, TX	Phoenix College	2	Oct. 1, 2007

=== 2007 recruiting class ===
College recruiting
Name	Hometown	School	Height	Weight	Commit date
Steven Gray; G	Bainbridge Island, WA	Bainbridge	6 ft 4 in (1.93 m)	190 lb (86 kg)	Jul 11, 2005
Steven Gray; G	Recruit ratings: Scout: Rivals: (93)				
Robert Sacre; C	North Vancouver, BC	Handsworth	7 ft 0 in (2.13 m)	255 lb (116 kg)	Oct 12, 2005
Robert Sacre; C	Recruit ratings: Scout: Rivals: (93)				
Austin Daye; F	Irvine, CA	Woodbridge	6 ft 10 in (2.08 m)	190 lb (86 kg)	May 16, 2006
Austin Daye; F	Recruit ratings: Scout: Rivals: (97)				
Overall recruit ranking: Scout: NR Rivals: 17 ESPN: 17
Note: In many cases, Scout, Rivals, 247Sports, On3, and ESPN may conflict in their listings of height and weight.; In these cases, the average was taken. ESPN grades are on a 100-point scale.; Sources: "2007 Gonzaga Rivals Commits". Rivals.; "2007 Gonzaga Scout Commits". Scout.; "2007 Gonzaga ESPN Commits". ESPN.; "Scout.com Team Recruiting Rankings". Scout.; "2007 Team Ranking". Rivals.; "2007–08 Gonzaga Bulldogs men's basketball team". 247Sports.

== Roster ==
2007–08 Gonzaga Bulldogs men's basketball team
Players
Coaches

Pos.	#	Name	Height	Weight	Year	Previous school	Hometown
F	31	Abdullahi Kuso	6 ft 9 in (2.06 m)	241 lb (109 kg)	RS Sr	Rimi; Rutgers; Tallahassee CC	Kaduna, Nigeria
G	22	David Pendergraft	6 ft 6 in (1.98 m)	223 lb (101 kg)	Sr	Brewster	Brewster, WA
F	42	Josh Heytvelt	6 ft 11 in (2.11 m)	255 lb (116 kg)	RS Jr	Clarkston	Clarkston, WA
G	11	Andrew Sorenson (W)	6 ft 2 in (1.88 m)	172 lb (78 kg)	RS Jr	Olympia	Olympia, WA
G	22	Micah Downs	6 ft 8 in (2.03 m)	190 lb (86 kg)	Jr	Juanita; Kansas	Kirkland, WA
G	2	Jeremy Pargo	6 ft 2 in (1.88 m)	219 lb (99 kg)	Jr	Robeson	Chicago, IL
F	50	Ira Brown	6 ft 4 in (1.93 m)	235 lb (107 kg)	Jr	Willis; Phoenix College	Conroe, TX
G	20	Larry Gurganious	6 ft 5 in (1.96 m)	199 lb (90 kg)	RS So	Saint Mary's	Berkeley, CA
C	45	Will Foster	7 ft 4 in (2.24 m)	260 lb (118 kg)	So	White River	Bonney Lake, WA
G	15	Matt Bouldin	6 ft 5 in (1.96 m)	214 lb (97 kg)	So	ThunderRidge	Highlands Ranch, CO
F	34	Theo Davis	6 ft 9 in (2.06 m)	207 lb (94 kg)	RS Fr	Lutheran Christian Academy	Brampton, ON
G	32	Steven Gray	6 ft 4 in (1.93 m)	190 lb (86 kg)	Fr	Bainbridge	Bainbridge Island, WA
F	5	Austin Daye	6 ft 10 in (2.08 m)	190 lb (86 kg)	Fr	Woodbridge	Irvine, CA
C	21	Robert Sacre	7 ft 0 in (2.13 m)	255 lb (116 kg)	Fr	Handsworth	North Vancouver, BC

Head coach

- Mark Few

Assistant coach(es)

- Leon Rice
- Tommy Lloyd
- Ray Giacoletti

Legend

- (C) Team captain
- (S) Suspended
- (I) Ineligible
- (W) Walk-on
- Injured
- Current redshirt

Roster

== Tournament build-up ==
Gonzaga received a 7 seed in the Midwest Region of the NCAA Tournament, and were paired against the 10 seed Davidson College, a sleeper pick by many experts. During the season, the Bulldogs played ten teams who eventually made it to the tournament, and played a total of 13 games against teams who made it into the tournament. The Zags won seven of those thirteen games, beating a 10 seed in Saint Mary's, a 13 seed in San Diego (Gonzaga won twice against San Diego), an 11 seed in Saint Joseph's, WKU, a 12 seed, a 14th seeded Georgia team, and a 4 seed in UConn. Gonzaga also lost six games against eventual tournament teams. They lost to Saint Mary's on the road, San Diego in the WCC Conference tournament, and also lost to a 1 seed in Memphis, a 2 seed in Tennessee, a 6th seeded Oklahoma Sooners team, and a 4 seed in Washington State at home.

== Schedule ==
Date time, TV	Rank^{#}	Opponent^{#}	Result	Record	Site (attendance) city, state
Regular season
11/11/2007*; 1:00 pm, FSN	No. 14	Montana	W 77–54	1–0	McCarthey Athletic Center (6,000); Spokane, WA
11/13/2007*; 8:00 pm, FSN	No. 14	Idaho	W 80–43	2–0	McCarthey Athletic Center (6,000); Spokane, WA
11/17/2007*; 5:00 pm, KHQ-TV	No. 14	UC-Riverside	W 84–48	3–0	McCarthey Athletic Center (6,000); Spokane, WA
2007 Great Alaska Shootout
11/22/2007*; 8:30 pm, ESPNU	No. 14	vs. Western Kentucky; Great Alaska Shootout	W 74–71	4–0	Sullivan Arena (8,383); Anchorage, AK
11/23/2007*; 9:00 pm, ESPN360	No. 14	vs. Texas Tech; Great Alaska Shootout	L 73–63	4–1	Sullivan Arena (8,700); Anchorage, AK
11/24/2007*; 7:00 pm, ESPN360	No. 14	vs. Virginia Tech; Great Alaska Shootout	W 82–64	5–1	Sullivan Arena (8,576); Anchorage, AK
11/29/2007*; 5:00 pm, ESPNU	No. 19	at Saint Joseph's	W 70–65 ^{OT}	6–1	Alumni Memorial Fieldhouse (3,200); Philadelphia, PA
12/01/2007*; 12:30 pm, ESPN	No. 19	at UConn; Basketball HOF Challenge	W 85–82	7–1	TD Banknorth Garden (18,007); Boston
12/05/2007*; 8:00 pm, ESPNU	No. 17	No. 8 Washington State	L 51–47	7–2	McCarthey Athletic Center (6,000); Spokane, WA
12/08/2007*; 5:00 pm, KHQ-TV	No. 17	Cal State Northridge	W 85–59	8–2	McCarthey Athletic Center (6,000); Spokane, WA
12/17/2007*; 5:00 pm, FSN	No. 18	Northern Colorado	W 77–57	9–2	McCarthey Athletic Center (6,000); Spokane, WA
12/20/2007*; 6:00 pm, ESPN2	No. 18	vs. Oklahoma; All-College Challenge	L 72–68	9–3	Ford Center (13,135); Oklahoma City, OK
12/29/2008*; 5:00 pm, ESPN2		vs. No. 11 Tennessee; Battle in Seattle	L 82–72	9–4	KeyArena (15,141); Seattle, WA
12/31/2008*; 5:00 pm, FSN		Utah	W 61–59	10–4	McCarthey Athletic Center (6,000); Spokane, WA
01/05/2008*; 5:00 pm, FSN		vs. Georgia; Ronald McDonald House Charities	W 75–67	11–4	Spokane Arena (12,064); Spokane, WA
01/12/2008; 5:30 pm, FSN		at Loyola Marymount	W 91–68	12–4 (1–0)	Gersten Pavilion (3,692); Los Angeles
01/14/2008; 9:00 pm, ESPN		at Pepperdine	W 92–57	13–4 (2-0)	Firestone Fieldhouse (2,954); Malibu, CA
01/19/2008; 1:00 pm, FSN		San Diego	W 80–70	14–4 (3–0)	McCarthey Athletic Center (6,000); Spokane, WA
01/21/2008; 9:00 pm, ESPN		San Francisco	W 72–64	15–4 (4–0)	McCarthey Athletic Center (6,000); Spokane, WA
01/26/2008*; 9:00 am, ESPN		at No. 1 Memphis	L 81–73	15–5	FedEx Forum (18,152); Memphis, TN
01/28/2008; 5:00 pm, FSN		Portland	W 79–41	16–5 (5–0)	McCarthey Athletic Center (6,000); Spokane, WA
02/02/2008; 4:00 pm, KHQ-TV		at Santa Clara	W 87–82 ^{2OT}	17–5 (6–0)	Leavey Center (4,500); Santa Clara, CA
02/04/2008; 8:00 pm, ESPN2		at No. 21 St. Mary's	L 89–85 ^{OT}	17–6 (6–1)	McKeon Pavilion (3,500); Moraga, CA
02/09/2008; 5:00 pm, KHQ-TV		Pepperdine	W 101–59	18–6 (7–1)	McCarthey Athletic Center (6,000); Spokane, WA
02/11/2008; 5:00 pm, FSN		Loyola Marymount	W 83–50	19–6 (8–1)	McCarthey Athletic Center (6,000); Spokane, WA
02/16/2008; 5:00 pm, ESPNU		at San Francisco	W 83–63	20–6 (9–1)	War Memorial Gymnasium (4,500); San Francisco, CA
02/18/2008; 8:00 pm, ESPN2		at San Diego	W 59–55	21–6 (10–1)	Jenny Craig Pavilion (5,100); San Diego, CA
02/25/2008; 8:00 pm, ESPN2	No. 24	at Portland	W 73–51	22–6 (11–1)	Chiles Center (4,527); Portland, OR
03/01/2008; 5:00 pm, KHQ-TV	No. 24	No. 25 St. Mary's	W 88–76	23–6 (12–1)	McCarthey Athletic Center (6,000); Spokane, WA
03/03/2008; 8:30 pm, ESPN2	No. 22	Santa Clara	W 88–54	24–6 (13–1)	McCarthey Athletic Center (6,000); Spokane, WA
2008 West Coast Conference tournament
03/09/2008*; 6:30 pm, ESPN2	No. 22	Santa Clara; Semifinals	W 52–48	25–6	Jenny Craig Pavilion (5,100); San Diego, CA
03/10/2008*; 6:00 pm, ESPN	No. 20	San Diego; Finals	L 69–62	25–7	Jenny Craig Pavilion (5,100); San Diego, CA
NCAA Division I men's basketball tournament
03/21/2008*; 9:25 am, CBS	No. 20 (7)	vs. No. 23 (10) Davidson; NCAA Tournament Round of 64	L 82–76	25–8	RBC Center (19,477); Raleigh, NC
*Non-conference game. ^{#}Rankings from AP Poll. (#) Tournament seedings in parentheses. All times are in Pacific Time.
