= George Pfeifer =

American college basketball coach

Biographical details
- Born: c. 1955 (age 70–71)
- Education: Lewis–Clark State, 1979

Coaching career (HC unless noted)
- 1977–1979: Lewis–Clark State (GA)
- 1979–1982: St. Maries HS (girls')
- 1982–1984: Hardin HS
- 1984–1985: Rocky Mountain (assistant)
- 1985–1987: Rocky Mountain (women's assistant)
- 1987–1989: Lewis-Clark State (assistant)
- 1989–2005: Lewis-Clark State
- 2005–2006: Idaho (assistant)
- 2006–2008: Idaho
- 2008–2011: Montana State - Billings
- 2011–2012: Montana State (assistant)
- 2014–2016: Lewis & Clark HS

Head coaching record
- Overall: 340–299 (college)

George Pfeifer (born 1955) is an American college basketball coach, whose last assignment was as an assistant coach at Montana State University in Bozeman.

He is a former head coach at three different college programs: Lewis–Clark State in Lewiston, Idaho, the University of Idaho in Moscow, and Montana State - Billings.

After serving as head coach for sixteen seasons at LCSC, his alma mater, Pfeifer left the NAIA college to become an assistant in the WAC at Idaho under Leonard Perry for the 2005–06 season. Perry was fired after the last game in March; Pfeifer was promoted later in the month, then compiled a two-season record of 12–48 (.200). He was fired in March 2008 with a year remaining on his three-year contract, succeeded by Don Verlin, an assistant at Utah State, and a previous finalist for the job in 2006.

A few months later, Pfeifer was hired as the head coach at Montana State–Billings in the Great Northwest Athletic Conference. After three seasons at the Division II school, his contract was not renewed in 2011 and he became an assistant coach in the Big Sky Conference under Brad Huse at Montana State in Bozeman.

In 2013, Pfiefer started working in basketball operations under head coach Mark Few at Gonzaga University in Spokane.

In 2014, Pfeifer became the head coach at Lewis and Clark High School in Spokane. In his first season, he compiled a record of 17–7, followed by 20–8 in 2015–16 and the Tigers placed sixth in the 4A state tournament. His two-year record at LC was 37–15 (.712), but in the late summer of 2016, Priefer resigned as the head coach to pursue a full-time teaching job in Spokane.

Pfeifer received his bachelor's degree in social science from Lewis-Clark State in 1979 and later earned a master's degree in educational administration from the University of Idaho. His first job in 1979 was as a teacher and girls' basketball coach at St. Maries High School, his alma mater.

== College head coaching record ==
Record table
Season	Team	Overall	Conference	Standing	Postseason
Lewis-Clark State (Frontier) (1989–2005)
Lewis-Clark State:		295–206			
Idaho (WAC) (2006–2008)
2006–07	Idaho	4–27	1–15	9th	
2007–08	Idaho	8–21	5–11	7th	
Idaho:		12–48	6–26		
Montana State - Billings (GNAC) (2008–2011)
2008–09	MSU Billings	10–17	5–11	7th	
2009–10	MSU Billings	15–10	9–7	4th	
2010–11	MSU Billings	8–18	6–12	8th	
MSU Billings:		33–45	20–30		
Total:		340–299			
National champion Postseason invitational champion Conference regular season champion Conference regular season and conference tournament champion Division regular season champion Division regular season and conference tournament champion Conference tournament champion
