= 2007–08 South Alabama Jaguars basketball team =

American college basketball season

2007–08 South Alabama Jaguars men's basketball

Sun Belt Regular season champions

NCAA tournament, first round
- Conference: Sun Belt Conference
- East Division
- Record: 26–7 (16–2 Sun Belt)
- Head coach: Ronnie Arrow (9th season)
- Home arena: Mitchell Center

2007–08 Sun Belt Conference men's basketball standings
| | Conf. | | | | Overall |
| Team | W | | L | PCT | W | | L | PCT |
|---|---|---|---|---|---|---|---|---|
East
| South Alabama | 16 | – | 2 | .889 | 26 | – | 7 | .788 |
| Western Kentucky † | 16 | – | 2 | .889 | 29 | – | 7 | .806 |
| Middle Tennessee | 11 | – | 7 | .611 | 17 | – | 15 | .531 |
| Florida Atlantic | 8 | – | 10 | .444 | 15 | – | 18 | .455 |
| Florida International | 6 | – | 12 | .333 | 9 | – | 20 | .310 |
| Troy | 4 | – | 14 | .222 | 12 | – | 19 | .387 |
West
| Arkansas-Little Rock | 11 | – | 7 | .611 | 20 | – | 11 | .645 |
| Louisiana–Lafayette | 11 | – | 7 | .611 | 15 | – | 15 | .500 |
| North Texas | 10 | – | 8 | .556 | 20 | – | 11 | .645 |
| New Orleans | 8 | – | 10 | .444 | 19 | – | 13 | .594 |
| Denver | 7 | – | 11 | .389 | 11 | – | 19 | .367 |
| Arkansas State | 5 | – | 13 | .278 | 10 | – | 20 | .333 |
| Louisiana–Monroe | 4 | – | 14 | .222 | 10 | – | 21 | .323 |
† 2008 Sun Belt Conference tournament winner Rankings from AP Poll

The 2007–08 South Alabama Jaguars basketball team represented the University of South Alabama during the 2007–08 NCAA Division I men's basketball season. The Jaguars were led by head coach Ronnie Arrow, in the first year of his second stint as head coach. They played their home games at the Mitchell Center, and were members of the Sun Belt Conference. They finished the season 26–7, 16–2 in Sun Belt play to finish tied for first place. They lost in the semifinals of the Sun Belt tournament, but received an at-large bid to the 2008 NCAA tournament as the 10 seed in the East region. In the opening round, the Jaguars lost to Butler.

== Roster ==
2007–08 South Alabama Jaguars men's basketball team
Players
Coaches

| Pos. | # | Name | Height | Weight | Year | Hometown |
|---|---|---|---|---|---|---|
| F | 1 | DeAndre Coleman | 6 ft 7 in (2.01 m) | 235 lb (107 kg) | Jr | Stone Mountain, Georgia |
| G | 2 | Daniel Hayles | 6 ft 5 in (1.96 m) | 210 lb (95 kg) | Jr | Mobile, Alabama |
| C | 2 | Charles Tabet | 6 ft 9 in (2.06 m) | 225 lb (102 kg) | RS Fr | Bloomfield Hills, Michigan |
| G | 3 | Domonic Tilford | 5 ft 11 in (1.8 m) | 170 lb (77 kg) | Jr | Louisville, Kentucky |
| G | 4 | Kevin Hayden | 5 ft 11 in (1.8 m) | 183 lb (83 kg) | Fr | Dallas, Texas |
| G | 5 | Daon Merritt | 5 ft 9 in (1.75 m) | 193 lb (88 kg) | Sr | Jamaica, New York |
| G | 10 | Demetric Bennett | 6 ft 5 in (1.96 m) | 205 lb (93 kg) | Sr | Albany, Georgia |
| G | 11 | DeAndrae Ross | 6 ft 2 in (1.88 m) | 175 lb (79 kg) | Fr | Panama City, Florida |
| F | 13 | Eric Chesser | 6 ft 5 in (1.96 m) | 225 lb (102 kg) | Fr | Naperville, Illinois |
| F | 21 | Brandon Davis | 6 ft 6 in (1.98 m) | 205 lb (93 kg) | Jr | Birmingham, Alabama |
| G | 22 | B. J. Ford | 6 ft 0 in (1.83 m) | 165 lb (75 kg) | Jr | Grand Rapids, Michigan |
| F | 25 | Ronald Douglas | 6 ft 8 in (2.03 m) | 225 lb (102 kg) | Jr | Baton Rouge, Louisiana |
| C | 33 | Philip Tabet | 6 ft 9 in (2.06 m) | 210 lb (95 kg) | So | Bloomfield Hills, Michigan |
| G | 42 | Chip Ivany | 6 ft 0 in (1.83 m) | 155 lb (70 kg) | So | Pflugerville, Texas |

Head coach

- Ronnie Arrow (Texas State)

Assistant coach(es)

Legend

- (C) Team captain
- (S) Suspended
- (I) Ineligible
- (W) Walk-on
- Injured
- Current redshirt

== Schedule and results ==
| Date time, TV | Rank^{#} | Opponent^{#} | Result | Record | Site (attendance) city, state |
Non-conference regular season
| Nov 10, 2007*; 7:05 p.m. | | West Florida | W 73–41 | 1–0 | Mitchell Center (4,976); Mobile, Alabama |
| Nov 13, 2007*; 7:00 p.m. | | at Ole Miss | L 78–81 | 1–1 | Tad Smith Coliseum (5,737); Oxford, Mississippi |
| Nov 17, 2007*; 7:05 p.m. | | Grambling State | W 76–56 | 2–1 | Mitchell Center (2,771); Mobile, Alabama |
| Nov 22, 2007*; 6:30 p.m. | | vs. Miami (OH); Anaheim Classic | L 59–64 | 2–2 | Anaheim Convention Center (1,607); Anaheim, California |
| Nov 23, 2007*; 7:00 p.m. | | vs. San Diego; Anaheim Classic | W 77–55 | 3–2 | Anaheim Convention Center (2,117); Anaheim, California |
| Nov 25, 2007*; 3:00 p.m. | | vs. Chattanooga; Anaheim Classic | W 84–67 | 4–2 | Anaheim Convention Center (897); Anaheim, California |
| Nov 29, 2007*; 7:00 p.m., CSS | | at Vanderbilt | L 88–91 ^{2OT} | 4–3 | Memorial Gymnasium (12,065); Nashville, Tennessee |
| Dec 2, 2007*; 3:05 p.m. | | Houston Baptist | W 66–62 | 5–3 | Mitchell Center (1,647); Mobile, Alabama |
| Dec 5, 2007*; 7:05 p.m. | | Southern Miss | W 75–68 | 6–3 | Mitchell Center (3,084); Mobile, Alabama |
| Dec 15, 2007*; 7:05 p.m. | | Mississippi State | W 71–67 | 7–3 | Mitchell Center (6,731); Mobile, Alabama |
Sun Belt Regular Season
| Dec 20, 2007; 7:05 p.m. | | Troy | W 84–73 | 8–3 (1–0) | Mitchell Center (2,758); Mobile, Alabama |
| Dec 22, 2007; 7:05 p.m. | | Middle Tennessee | W 75–61 | 9–3 (2–0) | Mitchell Center (2,660); Mobile, Alabama |
| Dec 29, 2007*; 7:05 p.m. | | Jacksonville | W 70–57 | 10–3 | Mitchell Center (2,676); Mobile, Alabama |
| Jan 2, 2008; 7:00 p.m. | | at Florida Atlantic | W 66–55 | 11–3 (3–0) | FAU Arena (595); Boca Raton, Florida |
| Jan 5, 2008; 7:05 p.m. | | Western Kentucky | W 65–61 | 12–3 (4–0) | Mitchell Center (6,783); Mobile, Alabama |
| Jan 12, 2008; 7:00 p.m. | | at New Orleans | W 97–88 | 13–3 (5–0) | Human Performance Center (882); New Orleans, Louisiana |
| Jan 16, 2008; 7:05 p.m. | | FIU | W 85–73 | 14–3 (6–0) | Mitchell Center (6,953); Mobile, Alabama |
| Jan 19, 2008; 7:05 p.m. | | at Arkansas-Little Rock | W 72–65 | 15–3 (7–0) | Jack Stephens Center (4,507); Little Rock, Arkansas |
| Jan 24, 2008; 7:05 p.m. | | Louisiana-Lafayette | W 66–60 | 16–3 (8–0) | Mitchell Center (5,832); Mobile, Alabama |
| Jan 27, 2008; 3:10 p.m. | | Denver | W 71–33 | 17–3 (9–0) | Mitchell Center (6,993); Mobile, Alabama |
| Jan 31, 2008; 7:00 p.m. | | at North Texas | L 68–70 | 17–4 (9–1) | Super Pit (3,218); Denton, Texas |
| Feb 2, 2008; 3:05 p.m. | | at Louisiana-Monroe | W 77–59 | 18–4 (10–1) | Fant-Ewing Coliseum (2,739); Monroe, Louisiana |
| Feb 7, 2008; 7:05 p.m. | | Arkansas State | W 81–58 | 19–4 (11–1) | Mitchell Center (5,797); Mobile, Alabama |
| Feb 10, 2008; 1:00 p.m. | | at Troy | W 90–74 | 20–4 (12–1) | Sartain Hall (2,169); Troy, Alabama |
| Feb 14, 2008; 7:30 p.m. | | at Middle Tennessee | L 70–76 | 20–5 (12–2) | Murphy Center (4,914); Murfreesboro, Tennessee |
| Feb 16, 2008; 7:05 p.m. | | Florida Atlantic | W 91–74 | 21–5 (13–2) | Mitchell Center (8,262); Mobile, Alabama |
| Feb 21, 2008; 7:00 p.m. | | at Western Kentucky | W 69–64 | 22–5 (14–2) | E.A. Diddle Arena (7,718); Bowling Green, Kentucky |
| Feb 25, 2008*; 7:05 p.m. | | Presbyterian | W 64–49 | 23–5 | Mitchell Center (3,606); Mobile, Alabama |
| Feb 28, 2008; 7:05 p.m. | | New Orleans | W 81–61 | 24–5 (15–2) | Mitchell Center (5,459); Mobile, Alabama |
| Mar 1, 2008; 7:30 p.m. | | at FIU | W 74–55 | 25–5 (16–2) | U.S. Century Bank Arena (956); Miami, Florida |
Sun Belt Conference tournament
| Mar 9, 2008*; 12:30 p.m. | (1) | (8) New Orleans; Quarterfinals | W 81–77 | 26–5 | Mitchell Center (6,997); Mobile, Alabama |
| Mar 10, 2008*; 6:30 p.m. | (1) | (4) Middle Tennessee; Semifinals | L 73–82 | 26–6 | Mitchell Center (6,397); Mobile, Alabama |
NCAA tournament
| Mar 21, 2008*; 2:00 p.m., CBS | (10 E) | vs. (7 E) No. 10 Butler; First Round | L 61–81 | 26–7 | Birmingham-Jefferson Civic Center (14,420); Birmingham, Alabama |
*Non-conference game. ^{#}Rankings from AP Poll. (#) Tournament seedings in parentheses. W=West. All times are in Central Time.
