= 2008 NCAA Division I men's basketball tournament =

Edition of USA college basketball tournament

- Season: 2007–08
- Teams: 65
- Finals site: Alamodome, San Antonio, Texas
- Champions: Kansas Jayhawks (3rd title, 8th title game, 13th Final Four)
- Runner-up: Memphis Tigers (Vacated) (2nd title game, 3rd Final Four)
- Semifinalists: North Carolina Tar Heels (17th Final Four); UCLA Bruins (18th Final Four)
- Winning coach: Bill Self (1st title)
- MOP: Mario Chalmers (Kansas)
- Attendance: 763,607
- Top scorer: Chris Douglas-Roberts (Memphis) (140 points)

The 2008 NCAA Division I men's basketball tournament involved 65 teams playing in a single-elimination tournament that determined the National Collegiate Athletic Association (NCAA) Division I men's basketball national champion for the 2007–08 season. The 70th annual edition of the tournament began on March 18, 2008, and concluded with the championship game on April 7, at the Alamodome in San Antonio, Texas.

For the first time since seeding began in 1979 (and the only time until the 2025 tournament), all four of the top seeds advanced to the Final Four. These were Memphis, the winner of the South region, UCLA, the winner of the West region making their third consecutive Final Four appearance, Kansas, the winner of the Midwest region, and overall number one seed and East region winner North Carolina, back in the Final Four for the first time since their 2005 national championship.

Memphis and Kansas advanced to the national championship game, with Memphis's victory in the semifinals giving them a record-setting 38 for the season, beating the mark set by Duke in 1999 (Kentucky later matched this record in 2012 and 2015). Kansas, however, spoiled their national championship hopes by handing the Tigers their second loss of the season, winning the game in overtime, 75–68. Memphis's entire season was later vacated by the NCAA due to eligibility concerns surrounding freshman guard Derrick Rose.

Entering the tournament on March 18, the top ranked team was North Carolina in both the AP Top 25 and the ESPN/USA Today Coaches' Polls, followed by Memphis, UCLA and Kansas.

American University (Patriot), UMBC (America East), Texas–Arlington (Southland), and Portland State (Big Sky) all entered the tournament for the first time in their school's history. Another school, Coppin State, won the MEAC Tournament to become the first 20-loss school to make the field. Georgia, a team that otherwise would not have advanced to the tournament, won the SEC tournament to qualify, and were awarded a #14 seed, the lowest by a major conference team in the tournament.

Although the 2007 tournament did not have many upsets, the 2008 tournament was full of them. The sub-regional pod played at the St. Pete Times Forum in Tampa, Florida, featured four games where a double digit seed won. #5 seeds Drake and Clemson fell to #12 seeds Western Kentucky and Villanova, respectively. The #4 seeds in that same pod, Vanderbilt and Connecticut, were defeated by #13 seeds Siena and San Diego. Western Kentucky advanced to the West regional in Phoenix, where the Hilltoppers lost to UCLA. Villanova was one of two double digit seeds to advance to the Midwest regional. The other was #10 seed Davidson, which rode the hot shooting of Stephen Curry to defeat Gonzaga, Georgetown, and Wisconsin before nearly upsetting Kansas in the regional final. In the Midwest region alone, four double-digit seeds advanced. In addition to Villanova, Siena, and Davidson, #11 seed Kansas State knocked off #6 seed USC.

The total tournament attendance of 763,607 set a record for highest total tournament attendance, breaking the record set during the 1999 tournament.

== Tournament procedure ==
The NCAA Division I Men's Basketball Championship is an annual single-elimination tournament featuring 65 teams representing all Division I Conferences in the nation. A "play-in" game determined which of the two lowest seeds would play in the first round of 64 against a top seed team. The Selection Committee seeded the entire field from 1 to 65 within four regionals of 16 teams; Mount St. Mary's, as the winner of the play-in game, automatically received a 16 seed.

== Schedule and venues ==
2008 opening round game (orange) and 2008 first and second rounds (green)
2008 Regionals (blue) and Final Four (red)

The following are the sites that were selected to host each round of the 2008 tournament:

Opening round

- March 18
  - University of Dayton Arena, Dayton, Ohio (Host: University of Dayton)

First and second rounds

- March 20 and 22
  - Honda Center, Anaheim, California (Host: Big West Conference)
  - Pepsi Center, Denver, Colorado (Hosts: Colorado State University, Mountain West Conference)
  - Qwest Center Omaha, Omaha, Nebraska (Hosts: Creighton University, Missouri Valley Conference)
  - Verizon Center, Washington, D.C. (Host: Georgetown University)
- March 21 and 23
  - BJCC Arena, Birmingham, Alabama (Host: Southeastern Conference)
  - Alltel Arena, North Little Rock, Arkansas (Hosts: University of Arkansas at Little Rock, Sun Belt Conference)
  - RBC Center, Raleigh, North Carolina (Host: North Carolina State University)
  - St. Pete Times Forum, Tampa, Florida (Host: University of South Florida)

Regional semifinals and finals (Sweet Sixteen and Elite Eight)

- March 27 and 29
  - East Regional, Charlotte Bobcats Arena, Charlotte, North Carolina (Host: University of North Carolina at Charlotte)
  - West Regional, US Airways Center, Phoenix, Arizona (Host: Arizona State University)
- March 28 and 30
  - Midwest Regional, Ford Field, Detroit, Michigan (Hosts: University of Detroit Mercy, Horizon League)
  - South Regional, Reliant Stadium, Houston, Texas (Hosts: University of Houston, Rice University)

National Semifinals and Championship (Final Four and Championship)

- April 5 and 7
  - Alamodome, San Antonio, Texas (Host: University of Texas at San Antonio)

== Qualifying teams ==

=== Automatic bids ===
The following teams were automatic qualifiers for the 2008 NCAA field by virtue of winning their conference's tournament (except for the Ivy League, whose regular-season champion received the automatic bid).

Conference	School	Appearance	Last bid
ACC	North Carolina	40th	2007
America East	UMBC	1st	Never
Atlantic 10	Temple	26th	2001
Atlantic Sun	Belmont	3rd	2007
Big 12	Kansas	37th	2007
Big East	Pittsburgh	20th	2007
Big Sky	Portland State	1st	Never
Big South	Winthrop	8th	2007
Big Ten	Wisconsin	14th	2007
Big West	Cal State Fullerton	2nd	1978
Colonial	George Mason	5th	2006
C-USA	Memphis	21st	2007
Horizon	Butler	8th	2007
Ivy League	Cornell	3rd	1988
MAAC	Siena	4th	2002
MAC	Kent State	5th	2006
MEAC	Coppin State	4th	1997
Missouri Valley	Drake	4th	1971
Mountain West	UNLV	16th	2007
Northeast	Mount St. Mary's	3rd	1999
Ohio Valley	Austin Peay	6th	2003
Pac-10	UCLA	42nd	2007
Patriot	American	1st	Never
SEC	Georgia	10th	2002
Southern	Davidson	10th	2007
Southland	Texas–Arlington	1st	Never
Summit	Oral Roberts	5th	2007
Sun Belt	Western Kentucky	20th	2007
SWAC	Mississippi Valley State	4th	1996
WAC	Boise State	5th	1994
West Coast	San Diego	4th	2003

=== Listed by region and seeding ===
A total of 31 teams received automatic bids for winning their conference tournament championship. Since the Ivy League does not hold a tournament, its regular season champion received the automatic bid. This left 34 at-large bids to be decided from the rest of the field by the NCAA Selection Committee. The at-large bids, along with the seeding for each team in the tournament, were announced on Sunday, March 16. Coppin State was the first team to make the tournament with 20 losses. Maryland-Baltimore County, American, Texas–Arlington, and Portland State all received their first tournament bids in school history. Four teams returned after absences from the NCAA Tournament of 20 years or more—Drake (last appearing in 1971), Cal State Fullerton (1978), Cornell (1988), and Baylor (1988).

East Regional – Charlotte
Seed	School	Conference	Record	Berth type
1	North Carolina	ACC	32–2	Automatic
2	Tennessee	SEC	29–4	At-Large
3	Louisville	Big East	24–8	At-Large
4	Washington State	Pac-10	24–8	At-Large
5	Notre Dame	Big East	24–7	At-Large
6	Oklahoma	Big 12	22–11	At-Large
7	Butler	Horizon	29–3	Automatic
8	Indiana	Big Ten	25–7	At-Large
9	Arkansas	SEC	22–11	At-Large
10	South Alabama	Sun Belt	26–6	At-Large
11	Saint Joseph's	Atlantic 10	21–12	At-Large
12	George Mason	CAA	23–10	Automatic
13	Winthrop	Big South	22–11	Automatic
14	Boise State	WAC	25–8	Automatic
15	American	Patriot League	21–11	Automatic
16	Mount St. Mary's	Northeast	18–14	Automatic
16	Coppin State	MEAC	16–20	Automatic

South Regional – Houston
Seed	School	Conference	Record	Berth type
1	Memphis	C-USA	33–1	Automatic
2	Texas	Big 12	28–6	At-Large
3	Stanford	Pac-10	26–7	At-Large
4	Pittsburgh	Big East	26–9	Automatic
5	Michigan State	Big Ten	25–8	At-Large
6	Marquette	Big East	24–9	At-Large
7	Miami (FL)	ACC	22–10	At-Large
8	Mississippi State	SEC	22–10	At-Large
9	Oregon	Pac-10	18–13	At-Large
10	Saint Mary's	West Coast	25–6	At-Large
11	Kentucky	SEC	18–12	At-Large
12	Temple	Atlantic 10	21–12	Automatic
13	Oral Roberts	Summit	24–8	Automatic
14	Cornell	Ivy League	22–5	Automatic
15	Austin Peay	Ohio Valley	24–10	Automatic
16	Texas–Arlington	Southland	21–11	Automatic

Midwest Regional – Detroit
Seed	School	Conference	Record	Berth type
1	Kansas	Big 12	31–3	Automatic
2	Georgetown	Big East	27–5	At-Large
3	Wisconsin	Big Ten	29–4	Automatic
4	Vanderbilt	SEC	26–7	At-Large
5	Clemson	ACC	24–9	At-Large
6	USC	Pac-10	21–11	At-Large
7	Gonzaga	West Coast	25–7	At-Large
8	UNLV	Mountain West	26–7	Automatic
9	Kent State	MAC	28–6	Automatic
10	Davidson	Southern	26–6	Automatic
11	Kansas State	Big 12	20–11	At-Large
12	Villanova	Big East	20–12	At-Large
13	Siena	MAAC	22–10	Automatic
14	Cal State Fullerton	Big West	24–8	Automatic
15	UMBC	America East	24–8	Automatic
16	Portland State	Big Sky	23–9	Automatic

West Regional – Phoenix
Seed	School	Conference	Record	Berth type
1	UCLA	Pac-10	31–3	Automatic
2	Duke	ACC	27–5	At-Large
3	Xavier	Atlantic 10	27–6	At-Large
4	Connecticut	Big East	24–8	At-Large
5	Drake	Missouri Valley	28–4	Automatic
6	Purdue	Big Ten	24–8	At-Large
7	West Virginia	Big East	24–10	At-Large
8	BYU	Mountain West	27–7	At-Large
9	Texas A&M	Big 12	24–10	At-Large
10	Arizona	Pac-10	19–14	At-Large
11	Baylor	Big 12	21–10	At-Large
12	Western Kentucky	Sun Belt	27–6	Automatic
13	San Diego	West Coast	21–13	Automatic
14	Georgia	SEC	17–16	Automatic
15	Belmont	Atlantic Sun	25–8	Automatic
16	Mississippi Valley State	SWAC	17–15	Automatic

Both USC and Memphis later vacated all wins from the season, leaving their official records at 0–11 and 0–1, respectively.

== Bracket ==
=== Opening Round game – Dayton, Ohio ===
Winner advances to 16th seed in East Regional vs. (1) North Carolina.

Opening Round game March 18
16a	Mount St. Mary's	69
16b	Coppin State	60

=== East Regional – Charlotte, North Carolina ===
First round March 20–21
1	North Carolina	113
16	Mount St. Mary's	74
Raleigh – Fri/Sun
8	Indiana	72
9	Arkansas	86
5	Notre Dame	68
12	George Mason	50
Denver – Thu/Sat
4	Washington St.	71
13	Winthrop	40
6	Oklahoma	72
11	Saint Joseph's	64
Birmingham – Fri/Sun
3	Louisville	79
14	Boise State	61
7	Butler	81
10	South Alabama	61
Birmingham – Fri/Sun
2	Tennessee	72
15	American	57

Second round March 22–23
1	North Carolina	108
9	Arkansas	77
5	Notre Dame	41
4	Washington State	61
6	Oklahoma	48
3	Louisville	78
7	Butler	71
2	Tennessee	76^{OT}

Regional semifinals March 27
1	North Carolina	68
4	Washington State	47
3	Louisville	79
2	Tennessee	60

Regional finals March 29
1	North Carolina	83
3	Louisville	73

=== Midwest Regional – Detroit, Michigan ===
First round March 20–21
1	Kansas	85
16	Portland State	61
Omaha – Thu/Sat
8	UNLV	71
9	Kent State	58
5	Clemson	69
12	Villanova	75
Tampa – Fri/Sun
4	Vanderbilt	62
13	Siena	83
6	~~USC~~	67
11	Kansas State	80
Omaha – Thu/Sat
3	Wisconsin	71
14	Cal State Fullerton	56
7	Gonzaga	76
10	Davidson	82
Raleigh – Fri/Sun
2	Georgetown	66
15	UMBC	47

Second round March 22–23
1	Kansas	75
8	UNLV	56
12	Villanova	84
13	Siena	72
11	Kansas State	55
3	Wisconsin	72
10	Davidson	74
2	Georgetown	70

Regional semifinals March 28
1	Kansas	72
12	Villanova	57
3	Wisconsin	56
10	Davidson	73

Regional finals March 30
1	Kansas	59
10	Davidson	57

USC vacated all 21 of its wins and its appearance in the 2008 NCAA tournament due to sanctions from the University of Southern California athletics scandal. Unlike forfeiture, a vacated game does not result in the other school being credited with a win, only with USC removing the wins from its own record.

=== South Regional – Houston, Texas ===
First round March 20–21
1	~~Memphis~~	87
16	Texas–Arlington	63
North Little Rock – Fri/Sun
8	Mississippi State	76
9	Oregon	69
5	Michigan State	72
12	Temple	61
Denver – Thu/Sat
4	Pittsburgh	82
13	Oral Roberts	63
6	Marquette	74
11	Kentucky	66
Anaheim – Thu/Sat
3	Stanford	77
14	Cornell	53
7	Miami (FL)	78
10	Saint Mary's (CA)	64
North Little Rock – Fri/Sun
2	Texas	74
15	Austin Peay	54

Second round March 22–23
1	~~Memphis~~	77
8	Mississippi State	74
5	Michigan State	65
4	Pittsburgh	54
6	Marquette	81
3	Stanford	82^{OT}
7	Miami (FL)	72
2	Texas	75

Regional semifinals March 28
1	~~Memphis~~	92
5	Michigan State	74
3	Stanford	62
2	Texas	82

Regional finals March 30
1	~~Memphis~~	85
2	Texas	67

=== West Regional – Phoenix, Arizona ===
First round March 20–21
1	UCLA	70
16	Mississippi Valley State	29
Anaheim – Thu/Sat
8	BYU	62
9	Texas A&M	67
5	Drake	99
12	Western Kentucky	101^{OT}
Tampa – Fri/Sun
4	Connecticut	69
13	San Diego	70^{OT}
6	Purdue	90
11	Baylor	79
Washington, D.C. – Thu/Sat
3	Xavier	73
14	Georgia	61
7	West Virginia	75
10	Arizona	65
Washington, D.C. – Thu/Sat
2	Duke	71
15	Belmont	70

Second round March 22–23
1	UCLA	51
9	Texas A&M	49
12	Western Kentucky	72
13	San Diego	63
6	Purdue	78
3	Xavier	85
7	West Virginia	73
2	Duke	67

Regional semifinals March 27
1	UCLA	88
12	Western Kentucky	78
3	Xavier	79^{OT}
7	West Virginia	75

Regional finals March 29
1	UCLA	76
3	Xavier	57

=== Final Four – Alamodome, San Antonio, Texas ===
National Semifinals; April 5
E1	North Carolina	66
MW1	Kansas	84
S1	~~Memphis~~	78
W1	UCLA	63

National Championship Game; April 7
MW1	Kansas	75^{OT}
S1	~~Memphis~~	68

Bracket Source

Memphis' entire 2007–08 schedule results were vacated due to NCAA sanctions involving the eligibility of Derrick Rose. Unlike forfeiture, a vacated game does not result in the other school being credited with a win, only with Memphis removing the wins from its own record.

== Game summaries ==
=== East Region ===
==== First round ====
Top seed North Carolina defeated the play-in game winner Mount St. Mary's 113–74. Their high scoring tied the mark for second most in North Carolina tournament history, aided by Tyler Hansbrough and Ty Lawson's 21 points each. They met Arkansas in the second round, a ninth seed who defeated eighth-seed Indiana 86–72. Indiana had struggled with several tough losses late in the season after a coaching scandal. Sonny Weems had a career-high 31 points despite Indiana having two AP All-Americans, D.J. White and Eric Gordon. Fifth seed Notre Dame advanced to the second round with a 68–50 win over 12th seed George Mason. George Mason had two starters from the 2006 final four team, but were unable to come back after a surge by the Irish early in the first half. In the same pod, fourth seeded Washington State defeated 13th-seed Winthrop 71–40, holding them to 11 points in the second half and leaving them far behind after a 25–1 run. In Birmingham, Alabama, the sixth seed Oklahoma defeated 11-th seeded St. Joseph's 72–64, led by David Godbold, a senior not normally known as a team leader who surprised many with his 25 points. Later in the evening, third seeded Louisville defeated WAC champion and 14th seed Boise State 79–61, sending the Broncos home for the second straight time. They had defeated Boise St. in the 1994 tournament as well, the last time the WAC team came to the tournament. In the afternoon session at Birmingham, seventh seeded Butler defeated tenth seed South Alabama in an 81–61 blowout, setting a school record for 30 wins in one season, and number two seed Tennessee survived a brief scare at the hands of 15th-seeded American, 72–57. American's star player, Garrison Carr, led his team with 26 points, tying the game at 40 with 11 minutes to go before Tennessee went on a 10–0 run to score the win.

==== Second round ====
Washington State, the region's fourth seed, was first to earn a spot in the Charlotte, North Carolina East Regional by handily beating fifth-seeded Notre Dame, 61–41 in Denver, Colorado. The rout came as a shock to many sportscasters, who expected Notre Dame's offense, which was averaging about 80 points a game, to outdo the Cougars. Instead, Notre Dame shot 24% from the field, their worst offensive effort since 1983 and the fifth-worst in the history of the NCAA tournament's opening rounds. Washington State's win brought them to their first-ever trip to the Sweet 16. Top-seeded North Carolina will challenge the Cougars after defeating Arkansas, the ninth seed, 108–77. The win marked only the third time the Tar Heels had won their first two tournament games by more than 20 points. The other two UNC teams to do this, in 1993 and 2005, went on to win the championship. With the win, North Carolina also set a school record for wins in a season, with 34. Second-seeded Tennessee survived an upset bid from number seven seed Butler, winning in overtime 76–71. Butler was behind throughout regulation, but managed to keep the game close and bring it to overtime, where they gained their first lead, 68–66, about 2 minutes into overtime. Some key defensive stands and free throws by the Volunteers, however, pulled them ahead. They will play third seed Louisville, who beat sixth seed Oklahoma, 78–48. Sooner star Blake Griffin had trouble scoring against Louisville's double-teams, and Louisville's 30-point win was the school's best tournament win since 1968.

==== Regional semifinals (Sweet Sixteen) ====
Top-seeded North Carolina defeated fourth seeded Washington State 68–47. Washington State was held to 47 points, the least allowed by a Tar Heel team in the tournament since 1946. Tyler Hansbrough struggled in the first half, but North Carolina's other players stepped to give the team a 14-point lead at halftime. In the second half, he led the team with 16 points, contributing to what was at one point in the half a 26-point lead. Third-seeded Louisville went on to face the Tar Heels in the East finals after defeating the second-seeded Tennessee Volunteers, 79–60. Earl Clark scored 17 points, 13 of them coming in the second half, and had 12 rebounds to lead the Cardinals. The Volunteers were held to 34% shooting and Louisville coach Rick Pitino improved to 8–0 in Regional semifinal games.

==== Regional final (Elite Eight) ====
CBS

March 29
9:05 PM ET

Recap

#3 Louisville Cardinals 73, #1 North Carolina Tar Heels 83
Scoring by half: 32–44, 41–39

Charlotte Bobcats Arena, Charlotte, North Carolina
Attendance: 19,092

In the East Regional finals in their home state, against third-seed Louisville, Tyler Hansbrough of the top-seeded Tar Heels carried the team with a 28-point performance, including five straight points after the Cardinals tied UNC midway through the second half to lead UNC to an 83–73 win. The Cardinals came close as the game neared its end, but a Ty Lawson 3 broke a 59–59 tie. Defensive stands combined with 8 for 8 free throw shooting down the stretch gave the Tar Heels the victory. Hansbrough was named the East Region's Tournament MVP.

=== Midwest Region ===
==== First round ====
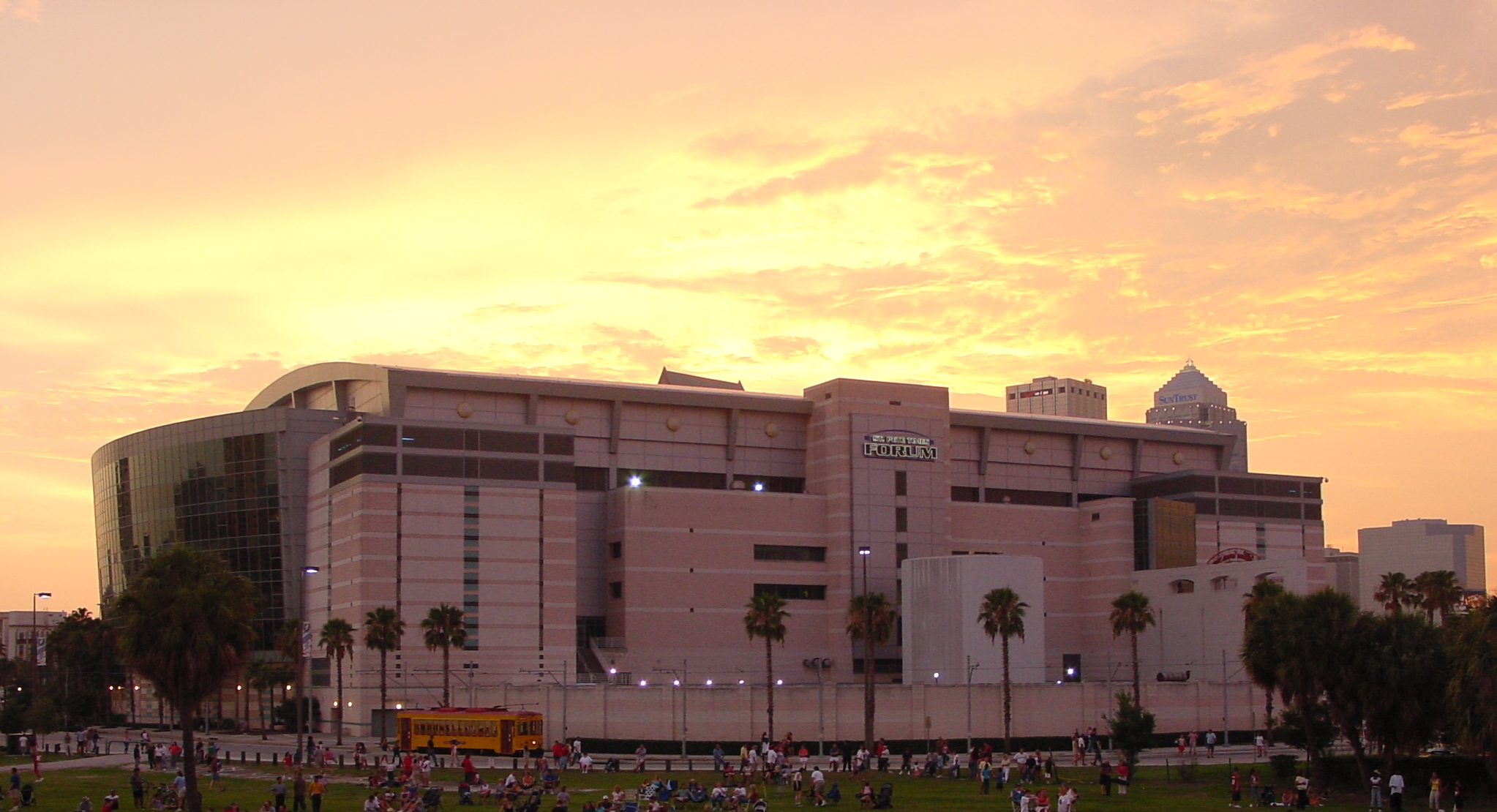
The Amalie Arena saw a record four upsets in four games in the tournament's first round.

The Midwest Region featured upsets knocking off the fourth through seventh seeds. Among these was the first upset of the tournament with 11th seed Kansas State's win over the sixth seeded Southern California Trojans 80–67 in Omaha, Nebraska. The media had focused a lot of attention on the freshman stars of both teams, the Wildcats' Michael Beasley and the Trojans' O. J. Mayo. In reality, while Beasley and Mayo did well, it was the other K-State players who made the difference, applying a strong defense to the Men of Troy's attack and coming up with the school's first tournament win since 1988. Also in the Midwest Region, #10 seed Davidson defeated seventh seeded Gonzaga 82–76 in Raleigh, North Carolina. Stephen Curry led the Wildcats with 40 points, 30 of them in the second half. His 40 points are the fifth most in NCAA tournament history, and gave Davidson their first tournament win since 1969. In the same region, 13th seed Siena upset fourth seed Vanderbilt 83–62 in Tampa, Florida. Future Harlem Globetrotter Tay Fisher made all six of his 3-point attempts, the Saints never trailed and became the first MAAC team to advance since 2004. The Midwest's first-round play ended with 12th seed Villanova's upset of fifth seed Clemson, 75–69, also in Tampa. Behind by eighteen late in the first half, the Wildcats came back, taking the lead at about the twelve-minute mark and holding it for the win. The Wildcats have won more games as an underdog in the tournament since seedings began in 1979 than any other team. With Villanova's win, the Forum saw a tournament record four upsets in one day. Earlier in the day, WKU, San Diego, and Siena defeated Drake, UConn, and Vanderbilt, to set the record.

Earlier that day in Omaha, ninth seed Kent State tied an NCAA Tournament record for scoring lows with their 10 points in one half against UNLV. Eighth-seed UNLV won the game 71–58. Top seed Kansas defeated 16th seed Portland State 85–61, thoroughly dominating both inside and outside with the win. Second-seed Georgetown defeated fifteenth seed Maryland-Baltimore County 66–47 in their first-round game, holding them to 31% shooting as compared to their 51%, and third seed Wisconsin stopped an upset threat from 14th seed Cal State Fullerton. The Titans' Josh Akognon scored 31 points, tying a career high, and Fullerton held the lead early in the second half, but were unable hold the lead under the Badgers' offensive pressure.

==== Second round ====
The third-seeded Badgers from the University of Wisconsin defeated Kansas State, 72–55 to become the first school to advance to Detroit, Michigan, and the Midwest Regional. KSU freshman star Michael Beasley was again dominant with 23 points and 14 rebounds, though he struggled in the second half with only six points due to the Badger defense. Top-seeded Kansas also advanced to the Sweet 16 by defeating eighth-seed UNLV 75–56. Four Jayhawks scored in double figures and the team shot 58% from the field while holding the Rebels to 26.7%. The following afternoon, the 12th-seeded Villanova Wildcats defeated the 13th-seeded Siena Saints in a 12-seed versus 13-seed Cinderella match-up by a score of 84–72 to reach their third Sweet 16 in four years. The Wildcats took an early lead and never trailed the entire game. Tenth-seeded Davidson became the second double-digit seed to advance to the Sweet Sixteen hours after Villanova's victory, ousting second-seeded Georgetown 74–70, to play Wisconsin in the other regional semifinal. Davidson won on the back of another tour-de-force performance in the second half by Stephen Curry. Curry singlehandedly outscored the Hoyas over the final 14:24, putting up 25 points to Georgetown's 22.

==== Regional semifinals (Sweet Sixteen) ====
Stephen Curry scored 33 points to lead Davidson to a 73–56 victory over Wisconsin. Davidson, the 10-seed, advanced to the Elite Eight for the first time since the 1969 tournament. Curry became only the fourth player in history to score 30 or more points in his first three tournament games. The Wisconsin defense, best in the nation at points allowed with 53.9, remained close until early in the second half, when some key steals and Davidson threes pulled the Wildcats far ahead.

In the night game, top-seeded Kansas defeated # 12 Villanova, 72–57. The Jayhawks went on a 14–2 run early and never faltered—Villanova never getting within six. Brandon Rush, Russell Robinson, and Mario Chalmers each scored 16, 15, and 14 points, respectively.

==== Regional final (Elite Eight) ====
CBS

March 30
5:05 PM ET

Recap

#10 Davidson Wildcats 57, #1 Kansas Jayhawks 59
Scoring by half: 28–30, 29–29

Ford Field, Detroit, Michigan
Attendance: 57,563

Kansas completed the first all top-seeded Final Four in NCAA Tournament history as they defeated tenth seeded Davidson 59–57. The outcome remained in doubt down to the final seconds. Kansas' Sherron Collins missed a shot with 21 seconds left, giving Davidson the final shot. Sophomore star Stephen Curry was double teamed, couldn't find a shot, and passed to Jason Richards, whose three-point shot missed. It was head coach Bill Self's first regional final win. The Wildcats' 25-game winning streak, the longest in the nation, was broken with the loss. Davidson's Stephen Curry scored 25 points and was chosen as the Midwest Region's Most Outstanding Player.

=== South Region ===
==== First round ====
Top seed Memphis took on Texas–Arlington, the region's 16th seed, and went on to win their opening-round contest, 87–63, in North Little Rock, Arkansas. Memphis went on to meet Mississippi State, an eight seed which came back from 13-down early in the second half against Oregon to rally for the win, 76–69. Fifth-seed Michigan State handily defeated # 12 Temple, 72–61, and fourth-seed Pittsburgh defeated 13th seed Oral Roberts 82–63, leaving the Golden Eagles behind after an 18–0 run in the first half. Sixth-seeded Marquette won its first tournament game since 2003 with a 74–66 win over #11 Kentucky in Anaheim. Kentucky got to within two points with 22 seconds remaining, but two Marquette free throws and a late steal handed the Wildcats an early tournament loss. They met third seed Stanford in the next round, who handily defeated 14th-seeded Cornell 77–53, never trailing the entire game, and never allowing the Big Red to get closer than 18 points in the second half. Miami (Florida), the seventh seed, defeated tenth seed Saint Mary's (California) 78–64, led by Jack McClinton and his 38 points. Their next opponent was second seed Texas, who never trailed in their 74–54 win over 15th seed Austin Peay, a game with four Longhorns scoring in double-figures.

==== Second round ====
Third-seeded Stanford saw Brook Lopez make the difference in overtime with a basket with 1.3 seconds left to beat Marquette 82–81 and advance to Houston, Texas. Stanford coach Trent Johnson was ejected in the first half, and Stanford had to fight a six-point deficit at halftime to come back for the win. Michigan State became the first lower seed to win in the region, with a 65–54 victory over Pittsburgh. The game was extremely physical and hard-fought, with the Panther coming back from 10 down to take the lead in the middle of the second half, only to see it vanish in the final minutes with help from eight straight points from the Spartan's Drew Neitzel. The Spartans would go on to play Memphis, the region's top seed after the Tigers beat eighth seed Mississippi State, 77–74. In their game, Memphis had four players scoring in double figures in what was a physical, defensive game—unlike what the games the Tigers were used to playing. Mississippi State gave them a late scare by coming to within two with four seconds left, but a free throw by Chris Douglas-Roberts of Memphis followed by a missed three on Mississippi's end gave the Tigers the win. Texas, the second seed, played the Cardinal in their home state after a 75–72 victory over seventh-seed Miami (Florida). Leading 66–50 with 4:15 left in the game, the Longhorns saw their lead melt in the face of a strong Hurricane rally and a hostile Arkansas crowd. Two key free throws by A. J. Abrams with 9.5 seconds left carried them to a three-point lead which held to the end of regulation.

==== Regional semifinals (Sweet Sixteen) ====
Tens of thousands of Texas fans turned out to Reliant Stadium in Houston and saw the second seeded Longhorns defeat the number three seeded Stanford Cardinal, 82–62. The unlikely defensive star of the game was Texas' Dexter Pittman. Normally not even a starter, Pittman was effective on the court, throwing his size against the tall Lopez twins, high-scorers at Stanford. On the offensive end, D. J. Augustin scored twenty-three points to combine with Damion James' 18 for the win. Stanford made things close at about the 13 minute mark of the second half, bringing it to within one at 52–51, but Texas went on a 16–2 run and turned the game into a rout. Later in the day, top-seeded Memphis defeated fifth seed Michigan State, 92–74. Memphis entered the game as the favorite but with several commentators pointing to them as the top seed most likely to lose. Instead, the Tigers went into halftime with a 30-point lead. Derrick Rose led his team with 27 points, and Chris Douglas-Roberts followed with 25, while Spartan star Drew Neitzel was held to just six.

==== Regional final (Elite Eight) ====
CBS

March 30
2:20 PM ET

Recap

#2 Texas Longhorns 67, #1 ~~Memphis Tigers~~ 85
Scoring by half: 28–39, 39–46

Reliant Stadium, Houston, Texas
Attendance: 32,798

Top seeded Memphis defeated Texas to reach the Final Four for the first time since 1985 with a convincing 85–67 win. Memphis spread the floor and used every man on the field to win. Texas star D J Augustin scored 16 points, but struggled with four turnovers in the second half. Derrick Rose won the Region's Most Outstanding Player award.

=== West Region ===
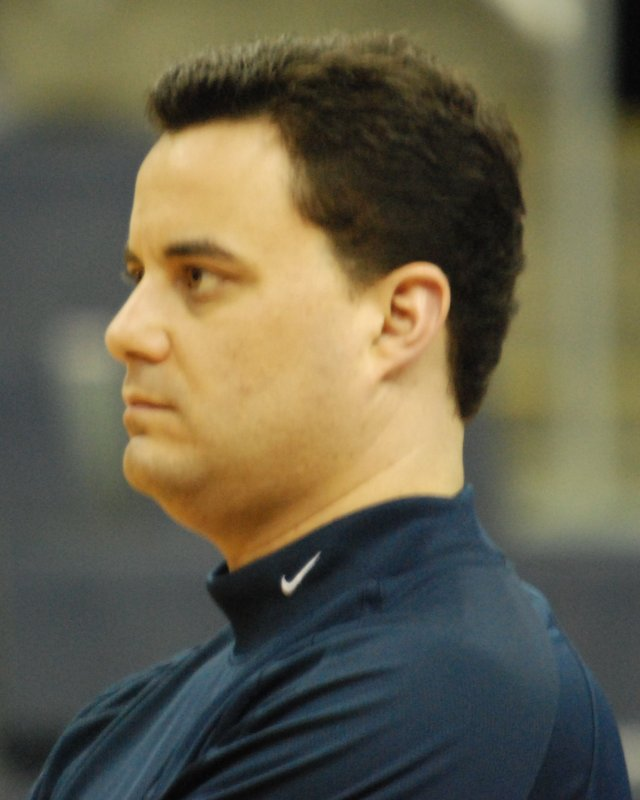
Xavier coach Sean Miller during a practice before a tournament game

==== First round ====
In the West Region, with a pod in Tampa as well, WKU entering as the 12th seed, defeated fifth seeded Drake in overtime 101–99. Drake had come back from sixteen down in the final eight minutes, bringing the game to overtime, and were ahead with 5.7 seconds left. Ty Rogers' three-pointer at the buzzer, the NCAA record-setting 30th three-point basket gave the Hilltoppers the walk-off victory. Also in the West, 13th seeded San Diego upset fourth seed Connecticut 70–69 in another overtime game. The Huskies struggled throughout the game, compounded by the loss of leading scorer A.J. Price to a torn ACL, and De'Jon Jackson's long jumper with 1.2 seconds remaining in the bonus period pulled the Toreros ahead for their first-ever tournament victory, and handed UConn their earliest egress from the tournament since 1979 as well as the first under coach Jim Calhoun. As regards close games and record-breakers, West Region 15th seed Belmont nearly upset second-seeded Duke in Washington, D.C., but a Gerald Henderson layup with 11.9 seconds left, together with a steal off the inbounds by DeMarcus Nelson in the final seconds, lifted the Blue Devils to victory. This would have been only the fifth time a 15 seed beat a 2 seed. The top seeded UCLA Bruins set several records in their win against 16th-seeded Mississippi Valley State at Anaheim, California, holding them to 29 points in a 70–29 victory. This was the lowest score in the first round in tournament history, and the lowest overall since 1946, before the shot clock rule was introduced. The Delta Devils' 19.7% shooting set another record for lowest shooting percentage in a game in tournament history.

Elsewhere in the West, third seed Xavier avoided an upset by 14th-seeded Georgia, coming back from nine down at the half to win 73–61. They were to play sixth-seeded Purdue next, who scored their tenth-straight first-round win by defeating the 11th seeded Baylor 90–79. Brigham Young, an eighth seed, lost to ninth-seeded Texas A&M 67–62. The Cougars suffered early, not scoring until about the 14-minute mark, but managed to bring the game to a tie at the half. Twenty-six points by Aggie forward Josh Carter, however, made the difference in Texas A&M's win. Lastly, West Virginia, seventh seed in the region, defeated tenth seed Arizona 75–65, scoring 11 three-point shots. With the win, the Mountaineers broke Arizona's streak of twenty straight 20-win seasons, previously the longest streak in the nation.

==== Second round ====
Seventh-seeded West Virginia began the second round of the tournament by defeating Duke, the second seed, 73–67. The Mountaineers trailed until about eight minutes into the second half, when they took a 43–40 lead. They outrebounded the Blue Devils 47–27, which, combined with several three-point shots, aided in the win. This loss marked Duke's second consecutive loss before the Sweet Sixteen round. West Virginia's Sweet Sixteen opposition in Phoenix, Arizona, was #3 Xavier, who defeated Purdue, 85–78. Xavier trailed as late as the 5:30 mark of the second half, but a widespread showing of talent from the Musketeers proved too difficult to stop, as four Xavier players scored in double figures, with two more tied at eight points each. Later that day, the top-seeded UCLA Bruins defeated ninth-seeded Texas A&M, 51–49. The Bruins trailed by as much as ten early in the first half, but slowly chipped away at the lead as the half progressed. The winning basket was scored with 9.5 seconds left on a lay-up by Darren Collison. Texas A&M had one final chance to tie it, but Donald Sloan's drive to the basket was stopped by two UCLA players (pictures show that they both appear to be grabbing Sloan, in what could have been a foul called on UCLA). The ensuing dunk by UCLA's Russell Westbrook was later waved off by officials as occurring after time had expired, making the final score 51–49. The Bruins then played WKU, a #12 seed who beat #13 seed San Diego by a 73–62 score. San Diego trailed by as much as 15 in the second half, but an 18–2 run gave them a one-point lead with 6 1/2 minutes remaining. WKU, however, managed to pull ahead once again for the win, making this tournament only the third in history to feature at least two 12-or-lower seeds in the Sweet 16.

==== Regional semifinals (Sweet Sixteen) ====
Xavier, the third seed in the West, defeated seventh seed West Virginia, 79–75 in overtime thanks to two B.J. Raymond three-pointers in the final 78 seconds. Raymond scored all eight of his points in the bonus round after being held scoreless in regulation, and poor free-throw shooting by the Mountaineers, missing four out of six free throws, sealed the victory. Josh Duncan led the Musketeers in scoring with a career-high 26 points, followed by Joe Alexander's 18 points and 10 rebounds. Xavier led by as much as 18 during the game, but trailed six late in OT, counting on Raymond's threes to give them the victory. Number one seed UCLA would play the Musketeers in the final, after outlasting 12th seeded WKU, 88–78. WKU came to within four late in the game, taking advantage of several sloppy Bruin mistakes. Kevin Love led UCLA with 29 points and 14 rebounds, aided by James Keefe's 18 points and 12 rebounds and Russell Westbrook's 14 and 11. Trailing 41–20 at the half, WKU came out of the locker room determined to win, as evidenced by Hilltopper star Tyrone Brazelton's 31 points, 25 of which came in the second half. A. J. Slaughter missed a crucial three-point shot that would have brought them to within one, and a UCLA run left them nine points behind only two minutes later.

==== Regional final (Elite Eight) ====
CBS

March 29
6:40 PM ET

Recap

#3 Xavier Musketeers 57, #1 UCLA Bruins 76
Scoring by half: 24–33, 33–43

US Airways Center, Phoenix, Arizona
Attendance: 18,103

UCLA was the first team to advance to the Final Four in San Antonio, Texas, the third straight year and the 18th time in school history they have done it, with a 76–57 victory over Xavier. Kevin Love led the Bruins with 19 points and ten rebounds, tied as high scorer with Darren Collison. Luc Richard Mbah a Moute contributed 13 points and 13 rebounds. Derrick Brown led the Musketeers with 13 points. Overall, Xavier was held to 36% shooting from the floor while UCLA shot 56.8%. Love was picked as the West Region's MOP.

=== Final Four ===
For the first time since the current seeding system started in 1979, all four #1 seeds made it to the Final Four. This would not happen again until 2025, coincidentally, also in San Antonio.

==== Memphis vs. UCLA ====
CBS

April 5
6:07 PM ET

Box score

#W1 UCLA Bruins 63, #S1 ~~Memphis Tigers~~ 78
Scoring by half: 35–38, 28–40
Pts: R. Westbrook 22; Rebs: L. Mbah a Moute 13; Asts: D. Collison 4	Pts: C. Douglas-Roberts 28; Rebs: J. Dorsey 15; Asts: D. Rose 4

Alamodome, San Antonio, Texas
Attendance: N/A
Referees: Karl Hess, Curtis Shaw, J.D. Collins

Memphis became the first team ever to win 38 games in one season by defeating UCLA 78–63 (Kentucky would match that record in 2012 and 2015). Chris Douglas-Roberts, who scored a game-high of 28 points, combined with Derrick Rose to score a total of 53 of Memphis' 78 points. UCLA star Kevin Love was held to 12 points, and the Bruins lost their second straight Final Four game. Memphis had lost to Ohio State in the Alamodome in the 2007 tournament, and had made it a goal to win in the arena in this year's tournament.

==== Kansas vs. North Carolina ====
CBS

April 5
8:47 PM ET

Box score

#MW1 Kansas Jayhawks 84, #E1 North Carolina Tar Heels 66
Scoring by half: 44–27, 40–39
Pts: B. Rush 25; Rebs: D. Arthur 9 Asts: R. Robinson 4	Pts: W. Ellington 18; Rebs: T. Hansbrough 9 Asts: Three tied at 2

Alamodome, San Antonio, Texas
Attendance: 43,718
Referees: Verne Harris, Tom Eades, Tony Greene

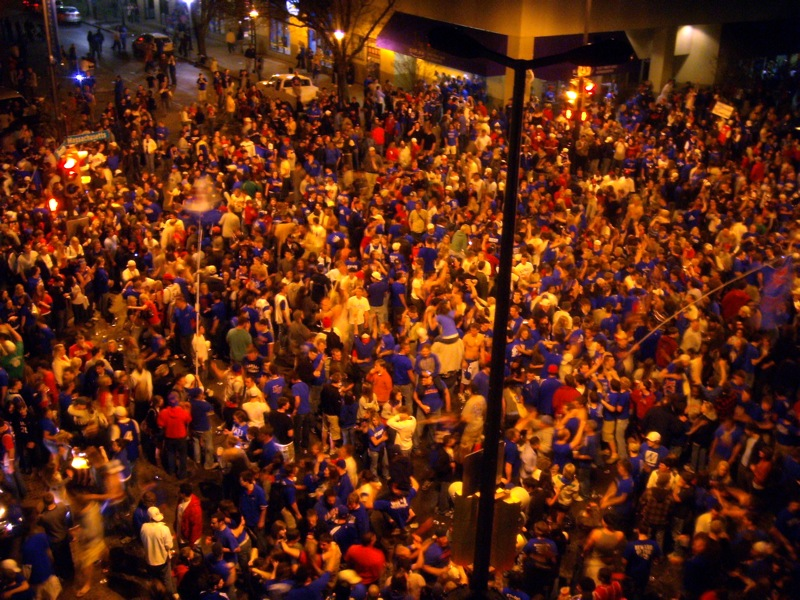
KU fans celebrating in downtown Lawrence after KU's win over UNC

The second semifinal was a highly anticipated matchup between North Carolina Head Coach Roy Williams and the team he had coached for 15 years before leaving to go to UNC. The game itself could be divided up as if it were three different games. The Jayhawks took a 40–12 lead in the first 15 minutes, causing CBS analyst Billy Packer to declare that the game was over. North Carolina narrowed the deficit to 17 at halftime on a 15–4 run and opened the second half on a 23–10 run to close to within 4 points with 11 minutes to play. After the teams traded baskets for a few minutes, Kansas pulled away, closing on a 20–7 run for an 84–66 victory. After Kansas went out to the 40–12 lead, North Carolina never held the ball with a chance to take the lead. Brandon Rush led the Jayhawks with 25 points. AP Player of the Year Tyler Hansbrough scored 17 points and had 9 rebounds, both below his season averages. The Tar Heels were led by Wayne Ellington's 18 points.

=== National Championship Game ===
CBS

April 7
9:21 PM ET

Box score

#MW1 Kansas Jayhawks 75, #S1 ~~Memphis Tigers~~ 68 (OT)
Scoring by half: 33–28, 30–35 Overtime: 12–5
Pts: Darrell Arthur 20; Rebs: Darrell Arthur 10; Asts: Sherron Collins 6	Pts: C. Douglas-Roberts 22; Rebs: Robert Dozier 10; Asts: Derrick Rose 8

Alamodome, San Antonio, Texas
Attendance: 43,257
Referees: John Cahill, Ed Hightower, Ed Corbett

The National Championship Game pitted Memphis against Kansas. The head coaches (KU's Bill Self and Memphis' John Calipari) had both been on the coaching staff of Kansas' 1986 Final Four team. Neither had garnered a national championship to this point in their head coaching careers. Memphis guard Chris Douglas-Roberts had been the leading scorer in the tournament, averaging 23.6 points per game. Memphis became the first team currently from a conference other than the six majors to play in the championship game since 1998. Utah advanced to the championship game in 1998, and UNLV was the last team from a non-major conference to win the national title in 1990.

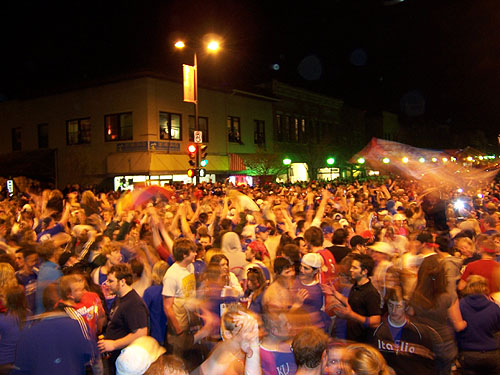
KU fans celebrating in downtown Lawrence after KU's win over Memphis

On the day of the game, the betting lines set by Las Vegas casinos Las Vegas Hilton, Station Casinos, and The Mirage made Memphis the favorite by a spread of 2 points.

The first half was back-and-forth as Kansas led for 7:37 minutes and Memphis led for 6:51 minutes. Kansas led 33–28 at halftime, the first second-half deficit that Memphis faced in the entire tournament. Memphis scored the first five points of the second half to tie the score at 33 with 18:57 left in regulation. After that Kansas maintained a small lead from the 16:04 mark until Memphis retook the lead with 8:11 remaining. Memphis then went on a 10–0 run to build a seven-point lead with 5:10 remaining and increased it to nine points with 2:12 remaining in regulation.

Kansas strategically fouled Memphis—an extremely poor free throw shooting team all season—which missed four of its final five free throws in regulation while Kansas furiously scored 12 points in the final two minutes of regulation. During that stretch Kansas made 100% of their shots going 2 for 2 from two-point range, 2 for 2 from three-point range and 2 for 2 from the free throw line. When Memphis failed to foul, which arguably would have all but assured a victory for the Tigers, Kansas guard Mario Chalmers hit a three-point basket with 2.1 seconds remaining to tie the game at 63, sending the game into overtime. Kansas fans now refer to this shot as Mario's Miracle. At the end of regulation, the Jayhawks had led the score a total of 17:55 minutes and Memphis 15:51 minutes.

In overtime, Kansas scored the first six points en route to a 75–68 win. They continued the blistering stretch they started in regulation, going 4 of 6 from the field and 4 of 4 from the line in overtime. It was KU's third NCAA title since the modern tournament began in 1939 (fifth national title overall, including two Helms decisions). It was also the first national championship for the program since the 1988 team.

This was the seventh overtime National Championship Game in NCAA Division I tournament history and first since 1997. It also represented the first national title for the Big 12 Conference.

The national championship appearance by Memphis would later be vacated as a result of NCAA rules infractions.

== Record by conference ==
Conference	# of Bids	Record	Win %	R32	S16	E8	F4	CG	NC
Big East	8	11–8	0.579	7	3	1	–	–	–
Big 12	6	12–5	0.706	5	2	2	1	1	1
Pac-10	6	8–6	0.571	3	3	1	1	–	–
SEC	6	4–6	0.400	3	1	–	–	–	–
ACC	4	6–4	0.600	3	1	1	1	–	–
Big Ten	4	5–4	0.556	3	2	–	–	–	–
Atlantic 10	3	3–3	0.500	1	1	1	–	–	–
WCC	3	1–3	0.250	1	–	–	–	–	–
Sun Belt	2	2–2	0.500	1	1	–	–	–	–
Mountain West	2	1–2	0.333	1	–	–	–	–	–
C-USA	1	5–1	0.833	1	1	1	1	1	–
Southern	1	3–1	0.750	1	1	1	–	–	–
Horizon	1	1–1	0.500	1	–	–	–	–	–
MAAC	1	1–1	0.500	1	–	–	–	–	–
Northeast	1	1–1*	0.500	–	–	–	–	–	–

* Mount St. Mary's won the opening round game.

The columns R32, S16, E8, F4, CG, and NC respectively stand for the round of 32, Sweet Sixteen, Elite Eight, Final Four, Championship Game, and National Champion.

Sixteen conferences—America East Conference, Atlantic Sun Conference, Big Sky Conference, Big South Conference, Big West Conference, Colonial Athletic Association, Ivy League, MAC, MEAC, Missouri Valley Conference, Ohio Valley Conference, Patriot League, Southland, SWAC, Summit League and WAC—went 0–1.

== Media ==
=== Television ===
==== CBS Sports ====
Jim Nantz, CBS Sports television announcer for the 2008 Final Four along with Billy Packer

For the 27th consecutive year, CBS Sports telecast the tournament, and for the 18th consecutive year, broadcast every game in the main bracket from the first round to the championship, as Jim Nantz and Billy Packer called the Final Four. ESPN carried the 64th-seed opening-round game between Coppin State and Mount St. Mary's on March 18, with Brent Musburger, Steve Lavin and Erin Andrews serving as the announcing team, as the network has done the opening-round game since 2002.

The complete list of announcing teams follows:

- Jim Nantz, Billy Packer and Sam Ryan (she was only used as Sideline Reporter for the Final Four and NCAA Championship game) – first & second round at Raleigh, North Carolina; South Regional at Houston, Texas; Final Four at San Antonio, Texas (It should be also noted that this was the 1st time Jim Nantz introduced the lineups in the Final Four semi-finals and the National Championship Game).
- Dick Enberg/Carter Blackburn and Jay Bilas – Blackburn Thursday afternoon; Enberg Thursday night, First & Second round at Anaheim, California; East Regional at Charlotte, North Carolina
- Verne Lundquist and Bill Raftery – first & second round at Birmingham, Alabama; West Regional at Phoenix, Arizona
- Gus Johnson and Len Elmore – first & second round at Denver, Colorado; Midwest Regional at Detroit, Michigan
- Kevin Harlan and Dan Bonner – first & second round at Omaha, Nebraska
- Ian Eagle and Jim Spanarkel – first & second round at Little Rock, Arkansas
- Craig Bolerjack and Bob Wenzel – first & second round at Washington, D.C.
- Tim Brando and Mike Gminski – first & second round at Tampa, Florida

Greg Gumbel once again served as the studio host, joined by analysts Clark Kellogg and Seth Davis. For the first time since the rights were acquired, the host team spent the entire tournament at the CBS Broadcast Center in New York City and did not travel to the Final Four site. CBS cited budget cutbacks ordered by the parent company, CBS Corporation. This would be Billy Packer's 35th and final tournament as a broadcaster, ending a streak that began in 1975; in July 2008, it was announced that Kellogg would replace Packer as Nantz's color man in 2009.

Several affiliates showed additional games on digital subchannels, and once, the Los Angeles area had simultaneous telecasts on two stations: On March 20, UCLA vs. Mississippi Valley State was shown on KCBS and Cal State Fullerton vs. Wisconsin was on independent station KDOC at the same time. (KCBS has a duopoly with KCAL, but KCAL was unavailable because of a third basketball game, one between the Los Angeles Lakers and the Utah Jazz in Salt Lake City.)

==== CBS College Sports Network ====
Sibling cable network CBS College Sports Network (now known as CBS Sports Network) picked up one CBS TV broadcast on each of the first two days of the tournament. It aired the Stanford-Cornell contest from Anaheim on March 20, and the St. Joseph's-Oklahoma game on March 21.

Unlike CBS Sports on the broadcast side, CBS College Sports Network did send a team to San Antonio, with Blackburn anchoring coverage and hosting the postgame highlights show, called the NCAA March Madness Highlights Show. Earlier, Greg Amsinger had hosted the postgame program from the network's studios at Chelsea Piers in lower Manhattan. Analysts included Steve Lappas, Greg Anthony, and Jay Williams.

=== Radio ===
Radio broadcasts were once again being handled again by CBS subsidiary Westwood One, hosted by Tommy Tighe.

==== Opening-round game ====
- Bill Rosinski and Steve Lappas – at Dayton, Ohio

==== First/second round ====
- Dave Sims and Bill Frieder – at Anaheim, California
- Ted Robinson and Mike Montgomery – at Denver, Colorado
- Kevin Kugler and Reid Gettys – at Omaha, Nebraska
- Mark Champion and Glenn Consor – at Washington, D.C.
- Joey Wahler and Pete Gillen – at Birmingham, Alabama
- Spencer Ross and Kyle Macy – at Little Rock, Arkansas
- Brad Sham and John Thompson – at Raleigh, North Carolina
- Wayne Larrivee and Kevin Grevey – at Tampa, Florida

==== Regionals ====
- Ian Eagle and Bill Frieder – East Regional at Charlotte, North Carolina
- Wayne Larrivee and John Thompson – Midwest Regional at Detroit, Michigan
- Brad Sham and Reid Gettys – South Regional at Houston, Texas
- Kevin Kugler and Pete Gillen – West Regional at Phoenix, Arizona

==== Final Four ====
- Kevin Kugler, John Thompson and Bill Raftery – at San Antonio, Texas

Kugler called his first Final Four replacing Harlan, with Raftery and Thompson on color commentary and Jim Gray as sideline reporter.

=== Other media ===
DirecTV once again offered NCAA Mega March Madness as a pay-per-view package for one payment of US$69. This allowed access to all tournament games in the first three rounds of the main draw not shown on the local CBS station in the viewer's area. This package was exclusive to DirecTV and not available to Dish Network, fiber optic, or cable subscribers.

Online, CBSSports.com and NCAA.com teamed up for NCAA March Madness on Demand. Computer users with broadband connections were able to watch all tournament games from the first round to the championship game for free, thanks to advertiser support from Coca-Cola, AT&T Mobility, Pontiac, and various other companies. The ads were not the same as those shown on television, and there was a separate halftime show hosted by Jason Horowitz joined by analysts including St. John's head basketball coach Norm Roberts.

== See also ==
- 2008 NCAA Division II men's basketball tournament
- 2008 NCAA Division III men's basketball tournament
- 2008 NCAA Division I women's basketball tournament
- 2008 NCAA Division II women's basketball tournament
- 2008 NCAA Division III women's basketball tournament
- 2008 National Invitation Tournament
- 2008 Women's National Invitation Tournament
- 2008 NAIA Division I men's basketball tournament
- 2008 NAIA Division II men's basketball tournament
- 2008 NAIA Division I women's basketball tournament
- 2008 NAIA Division II women's basketball tournament
- 2008 College Basketball Invitational
- 2007–08 NCAA Division I Men's Basketball season
