= 2008 Sun Belt Conference men's basketball tournament =

- Classification: Division I
- Season: 2007–08
- Teams: 13
- Site: Mitchell Center; Mobile, Alabama
- Champions: Western Kentucky (6th title)
- Winning coach: Darrin Horn (1st title)
- MVP: Jeremy Evans (WKU)
- Television: ESPN Regional Television, ESPN2

2007–08 Sun Belt Conference men's basketball standings
	Conf.				Overall
Team	W		L	PCT	W		L	PCT
East
South Alabama	16	–	2	.889	26	–	7	.788
Western Kentucky †	16	–	2	.889	29	–	7	.806
Middle Tennessee	11	–	7	.611	17	–	15	.531
Florida Atlantic	8	–	10	.444	15	–	18	.455
Florida International	6	–	12	.333	9	–	20	.310
Troy	4	–	14	.222	12	–	19	.387
West
Arkansas-Little Rock	11	–	7	.611	20	–	11	.645
Louisiana–Lafayette	11	–	7	.611	15	–	15	.500
North Texas	10	–	8	.556	20	–	11	.645
New Orleans	8	–	10	.444	19	–	13	.594
Denver	7	–	11	.389	11	–	19	.367
Arkansas State	5	–	13	.278	10	–	20	.333
Louisiana–Monroe	4	–	14	.222	10	–	21	.323
† 2008 Sun Belt Conference tournament winner Rankings from AP Poll

The 2008 Sun Belt Conference men's basketball tournament took place March 5–11, 2008. The first round was held at campus sites. The quarterfinals, semifinals and championship game took place in Mobile, Alabama at the Mitchell Center. The semifinals were televised by ESPN Regional Television. The Sun Belt Conference Championship Game were televised by ESPN2.

== Bracket ==
First round March 5
8	New Orleans	65
9	Denver	60
4	Middle Tennessee St	74
13	Louisiana-Monroe	69
5	Louisiana-Lafayette	60
12	Troy	70
6	North Texas	85
11	Arkansas State	63
7	Florida Atlantic	91
10	Florida International	64

Second round March 9
1	South Alabama	81
8	New Orleans	77
4	Middle Tennessee St	65
12	Troy	59
3	WKU	84
6	North Texas	70
2	Arkansas-Little Rock	66
7	Florida Atlantic	60

Semifinals; March 10
1	South Alabama	73
4	Middle Tennessee St	82
3	WKU	70
2	Arkansas-Little Rock	55

Sun Belt Conference Championship Game; March 11
4	Middle Tennessee St	57
3	WKU	67

Asterisk denotes game ended in overtime.
