= Cottage Grove High School =

Public school in Oregon, United States

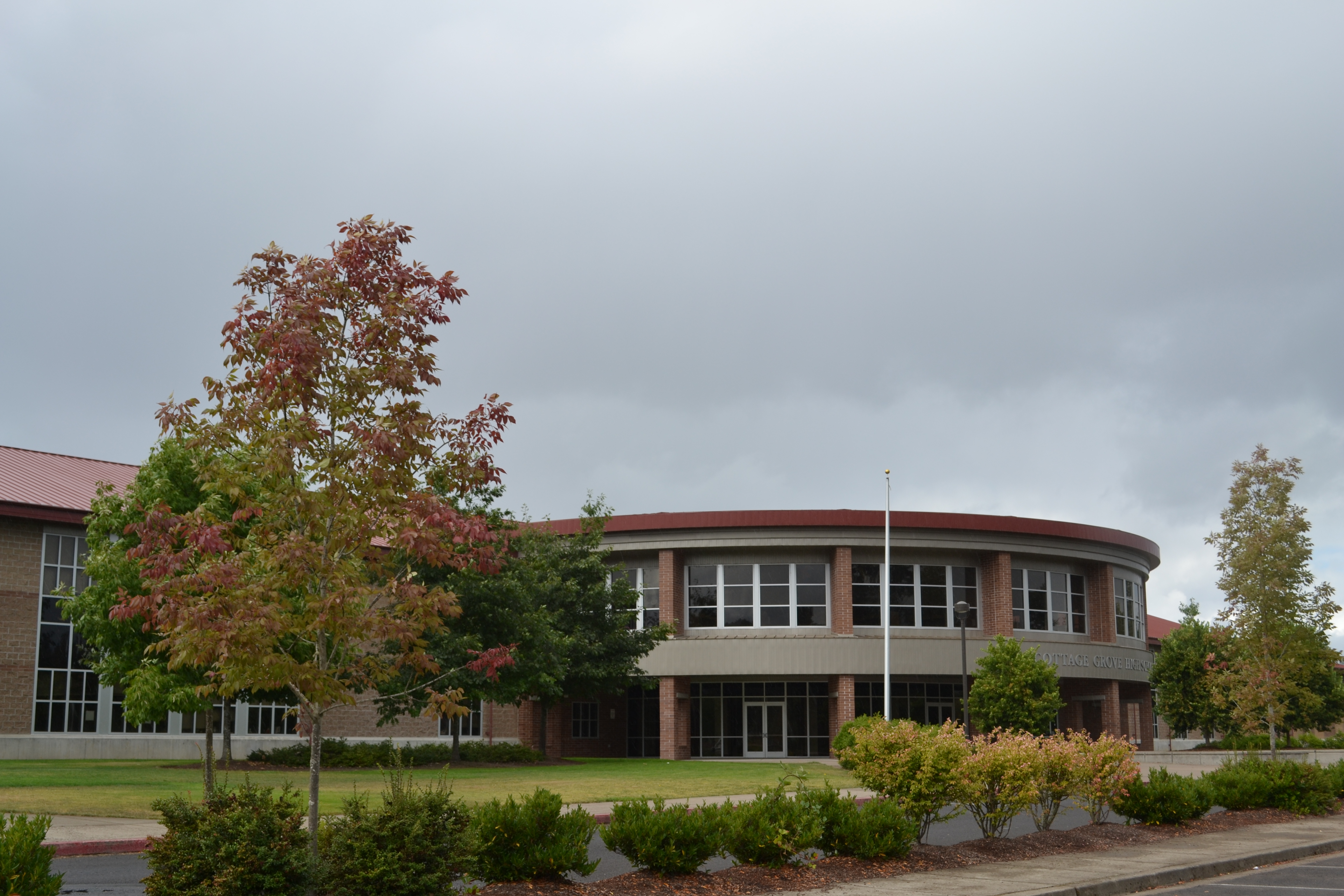

Location
- 1375 South River Road; Cottage Grove, (Lane County), Oregon 97424; United States; 43.786168°N 123.069851°W

Information
- Type: Public
- Opened: 1940 (new building opened in 2003)
- School district: South Lane School District
- Superintendent: Larry Sullivan (Interim)
- Principal: Kevin Herrington
- Staff: 41.93 (FTE)
- Grades: 9–12
- Enrollment: 674 (2023-2024)
- Student to teacher ratio: 16.07
- Colors: Royal blue and gold
- Athletics conference: OSAA Sky-Em League 4A-5
- Mascot: Lion
- USNWR ranking: 21st in Oregon (2018)
- Newspaper: Lion's Roar
- Yearbook: Lion Tracks
- Website: https://cghs.slane.k12.or.us/

Cottage Grove High School is a public high school located in Cottage Grove, Oregon, United States.

== History ==
The new school building, opened in 2003, replacing the old high school building which had been built in 1939 and held its first classes in 1940. The school was originally located at 1000 Taylor Avenue.

== Academics ==
In 2008, 92% of the school's seniors received a high school diploma. Of 195 students, 180 graduated, nine dropped out, three received a modified diploma, and three were still in high school the following year.

== Sports ==
=== State championships ===
- Boys 4A state swimming champions a total of 10 times and district/league champions 31 times
- Boys 4A state soccer champions in 2008
- Girls 4A state basketball champions in 2010
- Boys 3A state basketball champions 1991
- 3A state cheer champions 1991
- 4A state football champions 2017

== Other extracurricular activities ==
=== Notable awards ===
- Oregon High School Chess State Champions in 2011
