= Creswell High School (Oregon) =

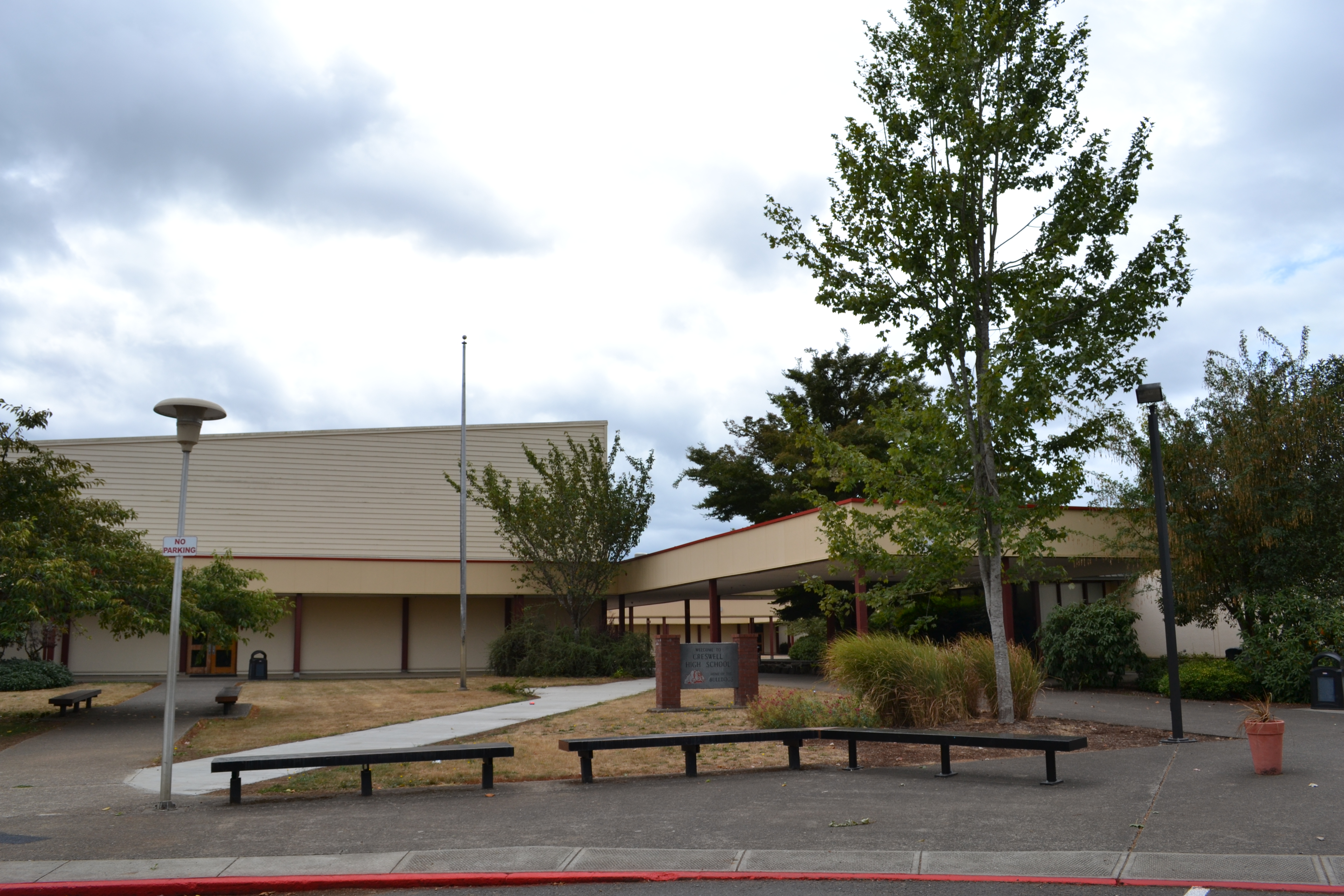

Location
- 33390 E Nieblock Lane; Creswell, Lane County, Oregon 97426; United States; 43.92451°N 123.028797°W

Information
- Type: Public
- School district: Creswell School District
- Principal: Jenny Collins
- Grades: 9-12
- Enrollment: 365 (2023–2024)
- Colors: Red, white, and black
- Athletics conference: OSAA PacWest Conference 3A-3
- Mascot: Bulldogs
- Rival: Pleasant Hill Billies
- Newspaper: Creswell Crescendo
- Website: creswell.k12.or.us/chs/

Creswell High School (Oregon) is a public high school in Creswell, Oregon, United States.

== Academics ==
In 2008, 80% of the school's seniors received their high school diploma. Of 84 students, 67 graduated, 12 dropped out, 2 received a modified diploma, and 3 remained in high school.

In 2009, 94.9% of the school's seniors received their high school diploma. Of the senior class: 93 graduated, 5 dropped out, and 0 received a modified diploma.

== Athletics ==
=== State championships ===
- Boys Basketball: 1969, 2000, 2004
- Boys Track and Field: 1962 OSAA
- Girls Track and Field: 2025
- Girls Track and Field, 4 × 400 m, Journey Meyer, Brooke Moehlmann, Kylie Leonard, Jordyn Lee:2025
- Girls Track and Field, 300mh, Kylie Leonard:2025

== Notable alumni ==
- Mark Few - Gonzaga Bulldogs men's basketball head coach (class of 1981)
- Luke Jackson - retired basketball player (class of 2000)
