= 2008 West Coast Conference men's basketball tournament =

- Classification: Division I
- Season: 2007–08
- Teams: 8
- Site: Jenny Craig Pavilion; San Diego, California
- Champions: San Diego (2nd title)
- Winning coach: Bill Grier (1st title)
- MVP: Brandon Johnson (San Diego)
- Television: ESPN2, ESPN

2007–08 West Coast Conference men's basketball standings
| | Conf. | | | | Overall |
| Team | W | | L | PCT | W | | L | PCT |
|---|---|---|---|---|---|---|---|---|
| No. 20 Gonzaga | 13 | – | 1 | .929 | 25 | – | 8 | .758 |
| Saint Mary's | 12 | – | 2 | .857 | 25 | – | 7 | .781 |
| San Diego † | 11 | – | 3 | .786 | 22 | – | 14 | .611 |
| Santa Clara | 6 | – | 8 | .429 | 15 | – | 16 | .484 |
| San Francisco | 5 | – | 9 | .357 | 10 | – | 21 | .323 |
| Pepperdine | 4 | – | 10 | .286 | 11 | – | 21 | .344 |
| Portland | 3 | – | 11 | .214 | 9 | – | 22 | .290 |
| Loyola Marymount | 2 | – | 12 | .143 | 5 | – | 26 | .161 |
† 2008 WCC tournament winner Rankings from AP Poll

The 2008 West Coast Conference men's basketball tournament took place March 7–10, 2008. The first round was held in San Diego, California at the Jenny Craig Pavilion. The semifinals were televised by ESPN2. The West Coast Conference Championship Game was televised by ESPN.

== 2008 West Coast Conference tournament ==
First round Friday, March 6
5 | San Francisco | 79
8 | Loyola Marymount | 60
6 | Pepperdine | 50
7 | Portland | 48

Quarter finals Saturday, March 7
4 | Santa Clara | 51
5 | San Francisco | 50
3 | San Diego | 73
6 | Pepperdine | 55

Semi-finals; Sunday, March 8
1 | #22 Gonzaga | 52
4 | Santa Clara | 48
2 | Saint Mary's | 69
3 | San Diego | 75^{OT}

Finals; Monday, March 9
1 | #22 Gonzaga | 62
3 | San Diego | 75
