= 2007–08 Arkansas Razorbacks men's basketball team =

American college basketball season

2007–08 Arkansas Razorbacks men's basketball

NCAA tournament, Round of 32
- Conference: Southeastern Conference
- West
- Record: 23–12 (9–7 SEC)
- Head coach: John Pelphrey (1st season)
- Assistant coaches: Rob Evans; Isaac Brown; Tom Ostrom
- Home arena: Bud Walton Arena

2007–08 Southeastern Conference men's basketball standings
	Conf.				Overall
Team	W		L	PCT	W		L	PCT
East
No. 5 Tennessee	14	–	2	.875	31	–	5	.861
Kentucky	12	–	4	.750	18	–	13	.581
No. 19 Vanderbilt	10	–	6	.625	26	–	8	.765
Florida	8	–	8	.500	24	–	12	.667
South Carolina	5	–	11	.313	14	–	18	.438
Georgia †	4	–	12	.250	17	–	17	.500
West
Mississippi State	12	–	4	.750	23	–	11	.676
Arkansas	9	–	7	.563	23	–	12	.657
Ole Miss	7	–	9	.438	24	–	11	.686
LSU	6	–	10	.375	13	–	18	.419
Alabama	5	–	11	.313	17	–	16	.515
Auburn	4	–	12	.250	14	–	16	.467
† 2008 SEC tournament winner As of April 7, 2008; Rankings from AP Poll

The 2007–08 Arkansas Razorbacks men's basketball team represented the University of Arkansas in the 2007–08 college basketball season. It was John Pelphrey's first season as head coach of the Razorbacks, replacing the fired Stan Heath. The team played its home games in Bud Walton Arena in Fayetteville, Arkansas.

== Roster ==
2007–08 Arkansas Razorbacks men's basketball team
Players
Coaches

Pos.	#	Name	Height	Weight	Year	Previous school	Hometown
F	15	Michael Washington	6 ft 9 in (2.06 m)	239 lb (108 kg)	So	Genesis One Christian School	McGehee, AR
G	12	Marcus Britt	6 ft 3 in (1.91 m)	198 lb (90 kg)	Fr	Forrest City HS	Madison, AR
G	14	Stefan Welsh	6 ft 3 in (1.91 m)	185 lb (84 kg)	So	Woodside HS; Hargrave Military Academy	Newport News, VA
G	25	Stephen Cox	6 ft 3 in (1.91 m)	201 lb (91 kg)	So	Jonesboro HS	Jonesboro, AR
F	13	Sonny Weems	6 ft 6 in (1.98 m)	201 lb (91 kg)	Sr	West Memphis HS; University of Arkansas-Fort Smith	West Memphis, AR
C	5	Darian Townes	6 ft 10 in (2.08 m)	255 lb (116 kg)	Sr	Archbishop Carroll HS; Hargrave Military Academy	Alexandria, VA
G	21	Patrick Beverley	6 ft 2 in (1.88 m)	172 lb (78 kg)	So	Marshall HS	Chicago, IL
G	0	Gary Ervin	5 ft 11 in (1.8 m)	169 lb (77 kg)	RS Sr	Robeson HS; Notre Dame Prep; Mississippi State	Brooklyn, NY
F	3	Charles Thomas	6 ft 8 in (2.03 m)	245 lb (111 kg)	Sr	Callaway HS	Jackson, MS
C	51	Steven Hill	7 ft 0 in (2.13 m)	250 lb (113 kg)	Sr	Branson HS	Branson, MO
F	33	Vincent Hunter	6 ft 10 in (2.08 m)	220 lb (100 kg)	RS Sr	J. A. Fair HS	Little Rock, AR
G	23	Levan Patsatsia	6 ft 6 in (1.98 m)	215 lb (98 kg)	Fr	58 Ltd	Tbilisi, Georgia
G	22	Nate Rakestraw	6 ft 4 in (1.93 m)	206 lb (93 kg)	Fr	Har-Ber HS	Siloam Springs, AR

Head coach

- John Pelphrey (Kentucky)

Assistant coach(es)

- Rob Evans (New Mexico State)
- Issac Brown (Louisiana–Monroe)
- Tom Ostrom (Minnesota)

Legend

- (C) Team captain
- (S) Suspended
- (I) Ineligible
- (W) Walk-on
- Injured
- Current redshirt

Roster
Last update: January 17, 2021

== Schedule and results ==
Date time, TV	Rank^{#}	Opponent^{#}	Result	Record	Site (attendance) city, state
Exhibition
November 2, 2007*		West Florida	W 117–43		Bud Walton Arena; Fayetteville, AR
November 6, 2007*		Campbellsville	W 96-56		Bud Walton Arena; Fayetteville, AR
Regular Season
November 9, 2007*	No. 19	Wofford	W 67-45	1-0	Bud Walton Arena (15,341); Fayetteville, AR
November 15, 2007*; ESPNU	No. 18	vs. Charleston; Puerto Rico Tip-Off	W 75-49	2-0	Coliseo de Puerto Rico (1,567); San Juan, Puerto Rico
November 16, 2007*; ESPNU	No. 18	vs. Providence; Puerto Rico Tip-Off	L 51-67	2-1	Coliseo de Puerto Rico (1,818); San Juan, Puerto Rico
November 18, 2007*; ESPN2	No. 18	vs. VCU; Puerto Rico Tip-Off	W 70-60	3-1	Coliseo de Puerto Rico (5,078); San Juan, Puerto Rico
November 24, 2007*		Delaware State	W 89-67	4-1	Bud Walton Arena (15,733); Fayetteville, AR
November 28, 2007*; Arkansas Sports Network (ARSN)		Missouri	W 94-91	5-1	Bud Walton Arena (18,621); Fayetteville, AR
December 1, 2007*		Oral Roberts	W 62-51	6-1	Bud Walton Arena (15,335); Fayetteville, AR
December 3, 2007*; Fox Sports Networks (FSN)		Missouri State	W 70-51	7-1	Bud Walton Arena (11,956); Fayetteville, AR
December 12, 2007*; ARSN		Texas-San Antonio	W 67-42	8-1	Bud Walton Arena (11,901); Fayetteville, AR
December 15, 2007*; ESPN2		at Oklahoma	L 72-83	8-2	Lloyd Noble Center (9,200); Norman, OK
December 19, 2007*; ARSN		Northwestern State	W 90-59	9-2	Bud Walton Arena (12,052); Fayetteville, AR
December 22, 2007*; ARSN		Appalachian State	L 67-74	9-3	Alltel Arena (10,835); North Little Rock, AR
December 29, 2007*; ARSN		Louisiana-Monroe	W 85-60	10-3	Bud Walton Arena (13,714); Fayetteville, AR
January 5, 2008*; 7:30 p.m., ARSN/Fox Sports Southwest		vs. Baylor; Border Battle	W 82-75	11-3	American Airlines Center (10,056); Dallas, TX
January 10, 2008; ESPN2		at Auburn	W 76-70	12-3	Beard-Eaves-Memorial Coliseum (6,079); Auburn, AL
January 13, 2008; Raycom Sports		Alabama	W 71-67 ^{OT}	13-3	Bud Walton Arena (19,153); Fayetteville, AR
January 16, 2008		South Carolina	L 66-70	13-4	Bud Walton Arena (17,883); Fayetteville, AR
January 19, 2008; FSN		at Georgia	L 69-82	13-5	Stegeman Coliseum (8,322); Athens, GA
January 26, 2008; ESPN Classic (ESPNC)		at LSU	W 68-52	14-5	Pete Maravich Assembly Center (8,860); Baton Rouge, LA
January 30, 2008; Raycom		Mississippi State	W 78-58	15-5	Bud Walton Arena (17,927); Fayetteville, AR
February 2, 2008; Raycom		No. 20 Florida	W 80-61	16-5	Bud Walton Arena (19,881); Fayetteville, AR
February 9, 2008; FSN		Ole Miss	W 75-69	17-5	Bud Walton Arena (19,916); Fayetteville, AR
February 13, 2008; Raycom		at No. 4 Tennessee	L 71-93	17-6	Thompson-Boling Arena (20,008); Knoxville, TN
February 16, 2008; ESPN		at Mississippi State	L 74-80	17-7	Humphrey Coliseum (10,096); Starkville, MS
February 20, 2008; Raycom		LSU	W 87-61	18-7	Bud Walton Arena (16,212); Fayetteville, AR
February 23, 2008; CBS		at Kentucky	L 58-63	18-8	Rupp Arena (24,371); Lexington, KY
February 27, 2008; Raycom		at Alabama	L 56-59	18-9	Coleman Coliseum (9,164); Tuscaloosa, AL
March 1, 2008; Raycom		No. 18 Vanderbilt	W 78-73	19-9	Bud Walton Arena (18,366); Fayetteville, AR
March 4, 2008; ESPN		at Ole Miss	L 72-81	19-10	Tad Smith Coliseum (8,168); Oxford, MS
March 8, 2008; ESPNC		Auburn	W 77-64	20-10	Bud Walton Arena (19,173); Fayetteville, AR
SEC Tournament
March 14, 2008; Raycom	(W2)	vs. (E3) No. 18 Vanderbilt; Quarterfinals	W 81-75	21-10	Georgia Dome (18,020); Atlanta, GA
March 15, 2008; Raycom	(W2)	vs. (E1) No. 4 Tennessee; Semifinals	W 92-91	22-10	Alexander Memorial Coliseum (2,517); Atlanta, GA
March 16, 2008; CBS, ESPN2	(W2)	vs. (E6) Georgia; Championship	L 57-66	22-11	Alexander Memorial Coliseum (3,700); Atlanta, GA
NCAA Tournament
March 21, 2008*; CBS	(9 E)	vs. (8 E) Indiana; First Round	W 86-72	23-11	RBC Center (19,477); Raleigh, NC
March 23, 2008*; CBS	(8 E)	vs. (1 E) No. 1 North Carolina; Second Round	L 77-108	23-12	RBC Center (19,477); Raleigh, NC
*Non-conference game. ^{#}Rankings from AP Poll. (#) Tournament seedings in parentheses. All times are in Central Time.
