= 2008 SEC men's basketball tournament =

- Classification: Division I
- Season: 2007–08
- Teams: 12
- Site: Georgia Dome and Alexander Memorial Coliseum (due to March 14 tornado); Atlanta, Georgia
- Champions: Georgia (2nd title)
- Winning coach: Dennis Felton (1st title)
- MVP: Sundiata Gaines (Georgia)
- Top scorer: Sundiata Gaines (Georgia) (69 points)
- Television: Raycom/LF Sports, CBS, ESPN2

2007–08 Southeastern Conference men's basketball standings
	Conf.				Overall
Team	W		L	PCT	W		L	PCT
East
No. 5 Tennessee	14	–	2	.875	31	–	5	.861
Kentucky	12	–	4	.750	18	–	13	.581
No. 19 Vanderbilt	10	–	6	.625	26	–	8	.765
Florida	8	–	8	.500	24	–	12	.667
South Carolina	5	–	11	.313	14	–	18	.438
Georgia †	4	–	12	.250	17	–	17	.500
West
Mississippi State	12	–	4	.750	23	–	11	.676
Arkansas	9	–	7	.563	23	–	12	.657
Ole Miss	7	–	9	.438	24	–	11	.686
LSU	6	–	10	.375	13	–	18	.419
Alabama	5	–	11	.313	17	–	16	.515
Auburn	4	–	12	.250	14	–	16	.467
† 2008 SEC tournament winner As of April 7, 2008; Rankings from AP Poll

The 2008 SEC men's basketball tournament took place on March 13–16, 2008, in Atlanta, Georgia. The University of Georgia, the improbable winner of the tournament, earned the Southeastern Conference's automatic bid to the 2008 NCAA tournament.

== Synopsis ==
The tournament was originally scheduled to be played at the Georgia Dome, but a tornado struck downtown Atlanta on the night of March 14, while the third of four quarterfinal games was in overtime. While that game was completed, SEC officials decided not to risk playing the fourth game, between the University of Kentucky and University of Georgia. That quarterfinal was subsequently postponed until Saturday morning. That game and all subsequent games were played at Alexander Memorial Coliseum on the campus of Georgia Tech, a school in the Atlantic Coast Conference (and coincidentally a former SEC member). Due to the smaller capacity, only the players' families, credentialed media, school officials and 400 fans from each school were allowed to attend the rest of the tournament.

Georgia, which had a sub-.500 record (13–16, 4–12 in the SEC) going into the tournament and had to win the title to secure an NCAA Tournament bid, was forced to play and win three games in the space of 30 hours, including two games on Saturday — the original quarterfinal game against Kentucky that was postponed by the tornado and venue change, and the subsequent semifinal game. Coincidentally, Georgia won the SEC tournament championship on the home court of its bitter rival, Georgia Tech. This was Georgia's first SEC men's basketball tournament championship since 1983.

== Television coverage ==
The first, quarterfinal, and semifinal rounds were televised by Raycom Sports, the successor to Lincoln Financial Sports (formerly Jefferson Pilot Sports), which folded into Raycom at the beginning of the year. The regular season preceding the tournament marks the 22nd season of the regionally syndicated package.

The SEC Championship Game was produced by CBS, but it was televised by ESPN2.

== Final SEC Regular Season Standings and Awards ==
=== Standings ===
SEC East
School	Coach	W	L	Seed
Tennessee	Bruce Pearl	14	2	E1
Kentucky	Billy Gillispie	12	4	E2
Vanderbilt	Kevin Stallings	10	6	E3
Florida	Billy Donovan	8	8	E4
South Carolina	Dave Odom	5	11	E5
Georgia	Dennis Felton	4	12	E6
SEC West
School	Coach	W	L	Seed
Mississippi State	Rick Stansbury	12	4	W1
Arkansas	John Pelphrey	9	7	W2
Mississippi	Andy Kennedy	7	9	W3
LSU	John Brady (fired Feb. 7); Butch Pierre (interim)	6	10	W4
Alabama	Mark Gottfried	5	11	W5
Auburn	Jeff Lebo	4	12	W6

== Bracket ==
First round March 13
W4	LSU	73
E5	South Carolina	77
E3	No. 18 Vanderbilt	93
W6	Auburn	82
E4	Florida	69
W5	Alabama	80
W3	Ole Miss	95
E6	Georgia	97*

Second round March 14, 15 †
E1	No. 4 Tennessee	89
E5	South Carolina	87
W2	Arkansas	81
E3	No. 18 Vanderbilt	75
W1	Mississippi State	69*
W5	Alabama	67
E2	Kentucky	56
E6	Georgia†	60*

Semifinals; March 15
E1	No. 4 Tennessee	91
W2	Arkansas	92
W1	Mississippi State	60
E6	Georgia	64

SEC Championship Game; March 16 ‡
W2	Arkansas	57
E6	Georgia	66

* Denotes game ended in overtime.
† Game originally scheduled for 9:45 p.m. the day before. Postponed due to tornado.
‡ - Game was originally to have been telecast on CBS.

=== All-Tournament Team ===
Sundiata Gaines, Georgia (Most Valuable Player)
Terrance Woodbury, Georgia
Charles Thomas, Arkansas
Darian Townes, Arkansas
Mykal Riley, Alabama

== Game delays and relocation ==
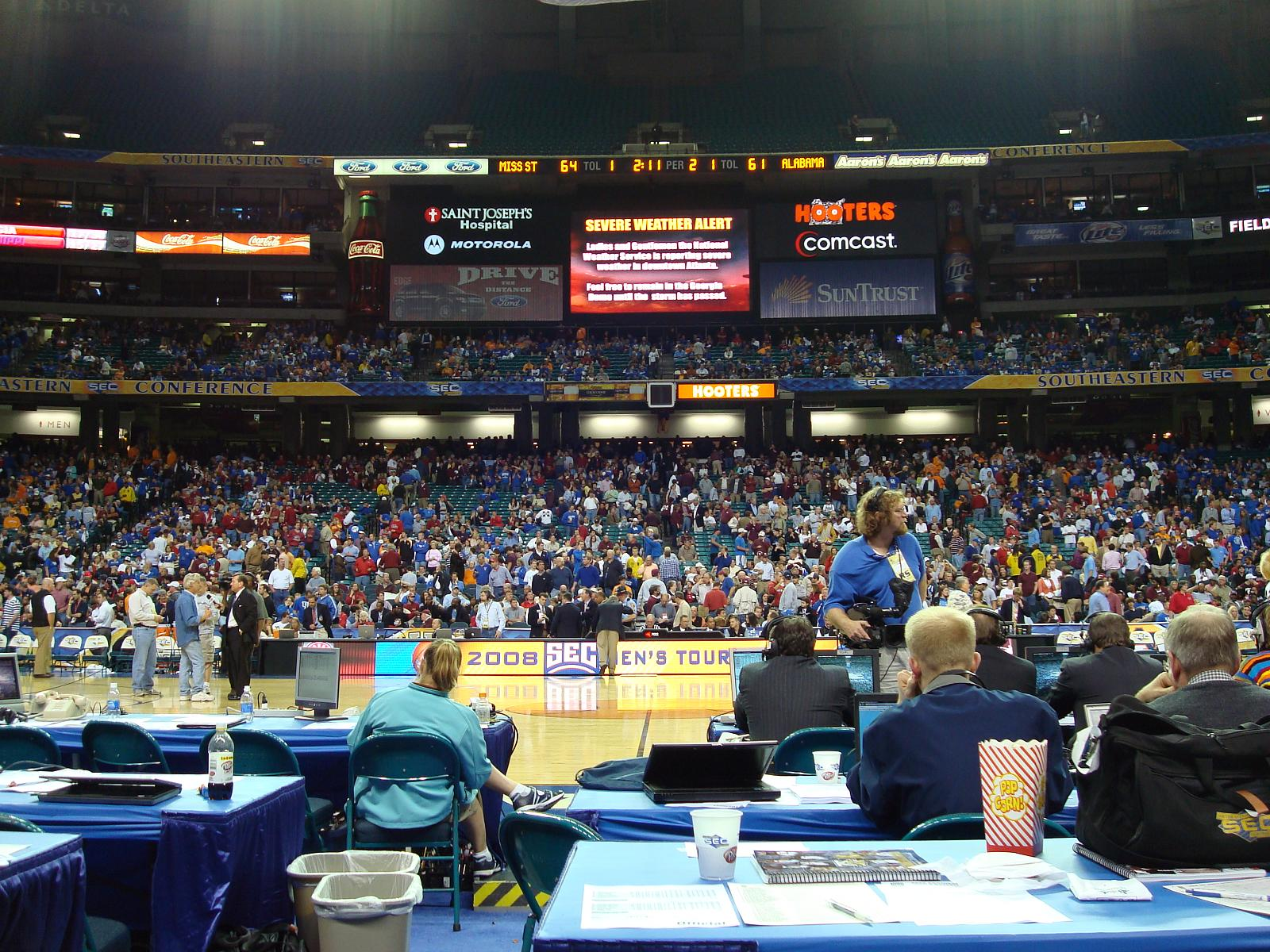
A hiatus in the Alabama vs. Mississippi State quarterfinal on March 14, 2008. The team returned to the court at 10:30 p.m. the same night, and Mississippi State defeated Alabama 69–67 in overtime.

During overtime of the Friday night quarterfinal between Mississippi State and Alabama, a tornado hit the Georgia Dome at 9:40 p.m. The National Weather Service had issued a tornado warning at 9:26 p.m., because radar indicated a thunderstorm capable of producing a tornado. The storm tore open a panel on the north side of the dome; sheared bolts and insulation fell into the arena. After the storm passed, the teams returned to the court at 10:30 and completed the game.

The Kentucky–Georgia basketball game, originally scheduled for Friday night, was postponed. It was rescheduled for Saturday at noon. Due to the severe damage suffered at the Georgia Dome, the remainder of the tournament was moved to Georgia Tech's Alexander Memorial Coliseum. The semifinals began at 6:00pm Saturday in Alexander Memorial Coliseum. Because the games were moved to a significantly smaller arena, only players' families & friends, bands, cheerleaders, and persons with working credentials were admitted. The SEC looked at several possible scenarios; one specifically mentioned by media involved playing only the Kentucky-Georgia game on Saturday, playing both semifinals on Sunday, and declaring the semifinal winners co-champions. However, tournament officials were told by the NCAA tournament selection committee (which included SEC commissioner Michael Slive) that it had to finish the tournament in order to preserve the league's automatic bid to the NCAA tournament.

The championship game was originally slated to be televised by CBS but was bumped to ESPN2 after the SEC opted to move the tip time to 3:30 p.m. (EDT). The move to ESPN2 was because CBS televised the Big Ten tournament final at 3:30 p.m. However, CBS still produced the game, with announcers Verne Lundquist and Bill Raftery calling the game. In Arkansas and Georgia, the state's CBS affiliates simulcast the SEC final live rather than the Big Ten final (which aired later on tape delay).
