= 2007–08 Ole Miss Rebels men's basketball team =

American college basketball season

2007–08 Ole Miss Rebels men's basketball

San Juan Shootout Champions

NIT, Semifinals
- Conference: Southeastern Conference
- West
- Record: 24–11 (7–9 SEC)
- Head coach: Andy Kennedy
- Assistant coaches: Mike White; Owen Miller; Torrey Ward
- Home arena: Tad Smith Coliseum

2007–08 Southeastern Conference men's basketball standings
	Conf.				Overall
Team	W		L	PCT	W		L	PCT
East
No. 5 Tennessee	14	–	2	.875	31	–	5	.861
Kentucky	12	–	4	.750	18	–	13	.581
No. 19 Vanderbilt	10	–	6	.625	26	–	8	.765
Florida	8	–	8	.500	24	–	12	.667
South Carolina	5	–	11	.313	14	–	18	.438
Georgia †	4	–	12	.250	17	–	17	.500
West
Mississippi State	12	–	4	.750	23	–	11	.676
Arkansas	9	–	7	.563	23	–	12	.657
Ole Miss	7	–	9	.438	24	–	11	.686
LSU	6	–	10	.375	13	–	18	.419
Alabama	5	–	11	.313	17	–	16	.515
Auburn	4	–	12	.250	14	–	16	.467
† 2008 SEC tournament winner As of April 7, 2008; Rankings from AP Poll

The 2007–08 Ole Miss Rebels men's basketball team represented the University of Mississippi during the 2007–08 NCAA Division I men's basketball season. Led by head coach Andy Kennedy in his second season, the Rebels competed at the Tad Smith Coliseum in Oxford, Mississippi, and were members of the West division of the Southeastern Conference.

The Rebels started their season 13–0, including a win against No. 15 Clemson in the finals of San Juan Shootout, a midseason tournament. Following the win, the Rebels were ranked for the first time since their 2000–01 season, reaching a peak of No. 16 in the AP poll. With a 7–9 conference record and 21–9 overall record during the regular season, Ole Miss ranked team third in the SEC West. In the first round of the 2008 SEC tournament, Ole Miss lost to Georgia in overtime, 97–95.

For the second year in a row, the Rebels were invited to the postseason 2008 National Invitation Tournament, where they defeated UC Santa Barbara in the first round, Nebraska in the second, and the one-seed Virginia Tech in the quarterfinals to advance to the semifinals at Madison Square Garden, where the Rebels lost to eventual tournament champions Ohio State. The Rebels finished their season with a total record of 24–11.

== Preseason ==
During the 2006–07 season, the Rebels were led by first-year head coach Andy Kennedy to a 21–13 record and 8–8 conference record, finishing with a co-West division regular season title with in-state rivals Mississippi State. In the 2007 SEC tournament, the Rebels advanced to the semifinals before falling to eventual victors Florida, who went on to win the national tournament. The Rebels also participated in that year's National Invitation Tournament, defeating Appalachian State in the first round, marking their first postseason victory since 2001, before losing in the second round to Clemson. The Rebels' 21 wins marked the most since their 2000–01 season, and the most ever by a debut coach at Ole Miss. With this performance, Kennedy was named the 2007 SEC Coach of the Year by the Associated Press.

After sitting out the 2006–07 season due to NCAA transfer rules, David Huertas, a shooting guard from Florida, became eligible to compete for the 2007–08 Rebels. On April 17, 2007, it was announced that sophomore forward Trey Hampton, sophomore center Xavier Hansbro, and freshman forward Andy Ogide would not return to the program.

In the 2007-08 SEC Media Preseason Poll, consisting of a panel of SEC and national media members, Ole Miss was predicted to finish last in the Western division. Senior Dwayne Curtis was projected to finish as a second-team All-SEC player.

=== Recruiting ===
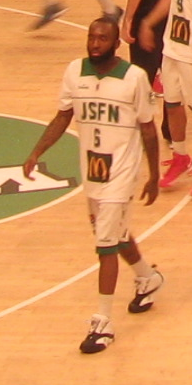
Point guard Chris Warren was part of the incoming recruiting class.

The Rebels signed three recruits during the November signing period, including Zach Graham, a 6-foot-5 small forward out of Peachtree Ridge High School in Suwanee, Georgia, where he earned All-State honors during his senior season. Rivals.com ranked him as the number 29 small forward and number 137 overall player in the nation. Also a star quarterback, Graham decided to pursue college basketball following his participation at a skills camp. Also signed was Kevin Cantinol, a 6-foot-8 center out of Clearwater, Florida, though originally from Martinique. Despite having played organized basketball for only three years, Cantinol received All-Conference honors while playing for Calvary Christian High School. The last signing of the year was Chris Warren, a 5-foot-11 point guard out of Dr. Phillips High School in Orlando, Florida. Warren earned All-State honors as a junior and was ranked the number 20 point guard in the nation by Scout.com. Warren chose Ole Miss over Old Dominion and VCU.

During the later signing period, the Rebels signed 6-foot-2 shooting guard Trevor Gaskins. Out of Chattahoochee High School in Alpharetta, Georgia, Gaskins was ranked as a three-star recruit and the number 18 recruit in the state by Rivals.com. Gaskins chose Ole Miss over Tennessee and Florida State. Also signed was 6-foot-7 small forward Wesley Jones out of Pearl River Community College in Poplarville, Mississippi. Jones, one of the top junior college recruits in the country, received All-America second-team honors during his sophomore campaign.

The Rebels also picked up 6-foot-5 shooting guard Terrence Watson out of Mott Community College in Flint, Michigan. Watson earned All-America honors after leading Mott to a National Junior College Athletic Association national championship. Watson picked Ole Miss over Charlotte, Houston, Detroit Mercy, Western Michigan, Marshall, and UAB.

The Rebels' final signing was that of Malcolm White, a 6-foot-9 power forward out of Genesis One Christian School in Mendenhall, Mississippi. Choosing Ole Miss over offers from Florida, Tennessee, Georgia, Florida State, and USC, White was a four-star recruit according to Rivals.com, who also ranked him as the number 86 player in the country, making White the highest-rated recruit in Ole Miss' incoming class.

College recruiting
Name	Hometown	School	Height	Weight	Commit date
Zach Graham; SF	Lawrenceville, Georgia	Peachtree Ridge High School (Georgia)	6 ft 5 in (1.96 m)	200 lb (91 kg)	Sep 3, 2006
Zach Graham; SF	Recruit ratings: Rivals: (93)				
Kevin Cantinol; C	Marianna, Florida	Clearwater High School (Florida)	6 ft 8 in (2.03 m)	215 lb (98 kg)	Oct 18, 2006
Kevin Cantinol; C	Recruit ratings: Rivals: (NR)				
Chris Warren; PG	Orlando, Florida	Dr. Phillips High School (Florida)	5 ft 11 in (1.80 m)	165 lb (75 kg)	Nov 9, 2006
Chris Warren; PG	Recruit ratings: Rivals: (91)				
Trevor Gaskins; SG	Alpharetta, Georgia	Chattahoochee High School (Georgia)	6 ft 2 in (1.88 m)	197.5 lb (89.6 kg)	Jan 13, 2007
Trevor Gaskins; SG	Recruit ratings: Rivals: (70)				
Wesley Jones; SF	Poplarville, Mississippi	Pearl River Community College (Mississippi)	6 ft 7 in (2.01 m)	205 lb (93 kg)	Mar 7, 2007
Wesley Jones; SF	Recruit ratings: Rivals: (JC)				
Malcolm White; PF	Baton Rouge, Louisiana	Genesis One Christian School (Mississippi)	6 ft 8.5 in (2.04 m)	217.5 lb (98.7 kg)	Mar 25, 2007
Malcolm White; PF	Recruit ratings: Rivals: (NR)				
Terrence Watson; SG	Detroit, Michigan	Mott Community College (Michigan)	6 ft 5 in (1.96 m)	213.5 lb (96.8 kg)	May 9, 2007
Terrence Watson; SG	Recruit ratings: Rivals: (JC)				
Overall recruit ranking:
Note: In many cases, Scout, Rivals, 247Sports, On3, and ESPN may conflict in their listings of height and weight.; In these cases, the average was taken. ESPN grades are on a 100-point scale.; Sources: "Ole Miss 2007 Basketball Commitments". Rivals.; "ESPN". ESPN.; "2007 Team Ranking". Rivals.

== Roster ==
2007–08 Ole Miss Rebels men's basketball team
Players
Coaches

Pos.	#	Name	Height	Weight	Year	Hometown
F	0	Jermey Parnell	6 ft 9 in (2.06 m)	242 lb (110 kg)	Sr	Gosnell, Arkansas
G	1	Rodney Jones	6 ft 4 in (1.93 m)	190 lb (86 kg)	So	Alexandria, Louisiana
G	3	Brian Smith	5 ft 11 in (1.8 m)	180 lb (82 kg)	Sr	Lexington, Kentucky
G	5	Will Poole	6 ft 3 in (1.91 m)	195 lb (88 kg)	Fr	Batesville, Mississippi
F	10	Terrence Watson	6 ft 5 in (1.96 m)	211 lb (96 kg)	Jr	Detroit, Michigan
G	12	Chris Warren	5 ft 10 in (1.78 m)	168 lb (76 kg)	Fr	Orlando, Florida
G	14	Eniel Polynice	6 ft 5 in (1.96 m)	220 lb (100 kg)	So	Sarasota, Florida
F	20	Wesley Jones	6 ft 7 in (2.01 m)	210 lb (95 kg)	So	Beatrice, Alabama
F	21	Malcolm White	6 ft 9 in (2.06 m)	220 lb (100 kg)	Fr	Baton Rouge, Louisiana
G	22	Patrick Spach	6 ft 1 in (1.85 m)	165 lb (75 kg)	Jr	Memphis, Tennessee
G	23	Trevor Gaskins	6 ft 2 in (1.88 m)	215 lb (98 kg)	Fr	Alpharetta, Georgia
G	25	Ryan Brown	6 ft 1 in (1.85 m)	208 lb (94 kg)	Jr	Texarkana, Texas
G	32	Zach Graham	6 ft 6 in (1.98 m)	218 lb (99 kg)	Fr	Suwanee, Georgia
G	33	David Huertas	6 ft 5 in (1.96 m)	200 lb (91 kg)	So	Humacao, Puerto Rico
C	44	Dwayne Curtis	6 ft 9 in (2.06 m)	262 lb (119 kg)	Sr	Chicago, Illinois
F	50	Kenny Williams	6 ft 8 in (2.03 m)	240 lb (109 kg)	Sr	Miami, Florida

Head coach

- Andy Kennedy (UAB)

Assistant coach(es)

- Mike White (Mississippi)
- Owen Miller (Mississippi Christian)
- Torrey Ward (UAB)

Legend

- (C) Team captain
- (S) Suspended
- (I) Ineligible
- (W) Walk-on
- Injured
- Current redshirt

Roster

== Season ==
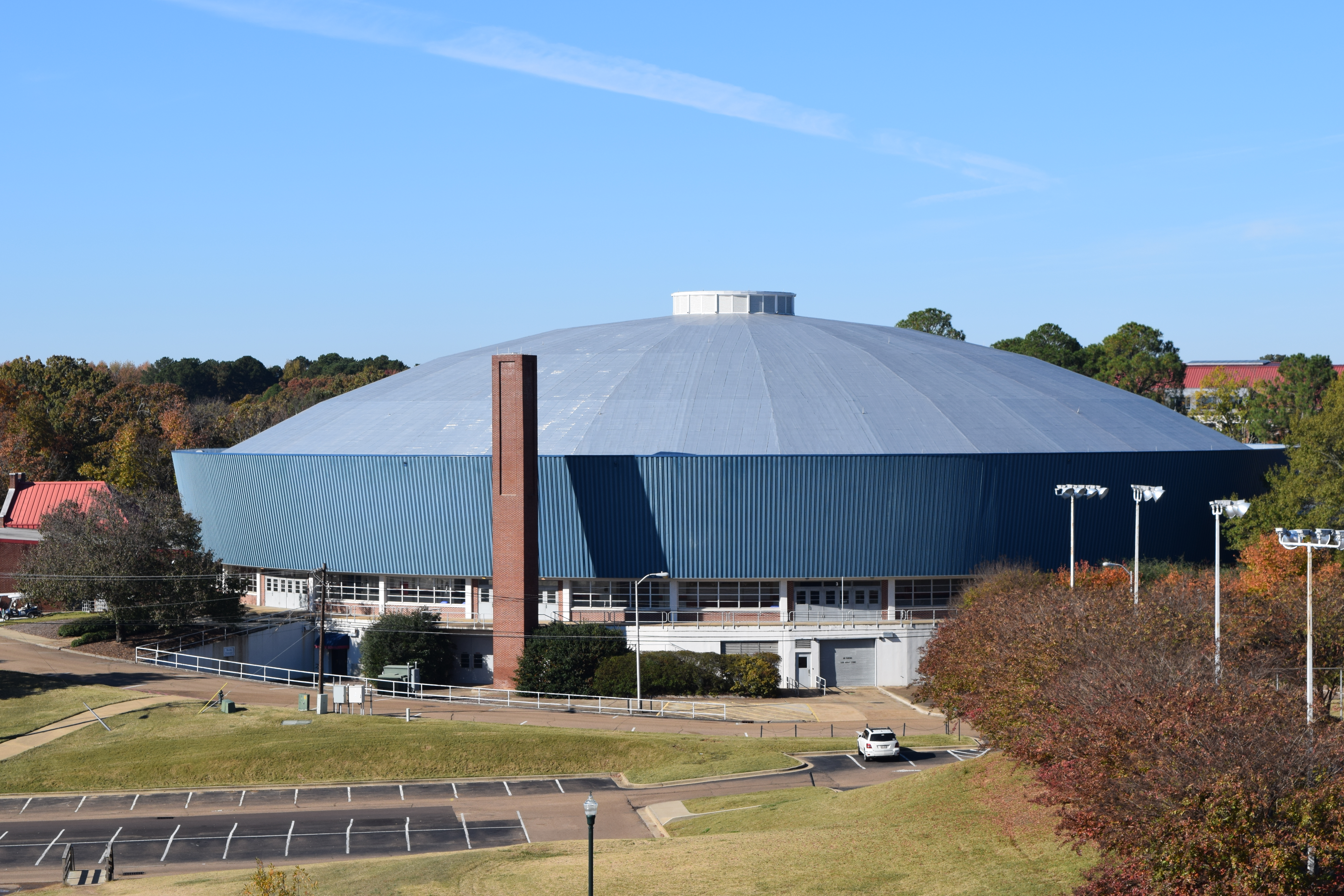
The Rebels played their home games at the Tad Smith Coliseum.

The Rebels began their season on November 2 with an exhibition game against Division II Delta State, who they soundly defeated 110–65.

=== Non-conference slate ===
On November 10, the Rebels hosted Mississippi Valley State for their season opener. They defeated the Delta Devils comfortably, 97–63. In his debut, freshman Trevor Gaskins scored seven three-pointers, one shy of the school record set by Keith Carter. Three days later, the Rebels hosted South Alabama. Despite holding a 22-point lead in the first half, the Jaguars of South Alabama nearly came back, however, Ole Miss, largely led by Eniel Polynice's 28-point performance, held them off, winning 81–78. Ole Miss continued with a string of dominant home victories, with a 108–70 win against Lamar on November 16, a 94–70 win against Louisiana–Monroe on November 24, and a 102–76 win against Troy on November 27. Following the 85–77 win against also-unbeaten New Mexico on December 1, the Rebels were off to their first 6–0 start since the 2000–01 season, which started 11–0.

On December 8, the Rebels took to the road for the first time, traveling to the newly constructed UCF Arena in Orlando, Florida, to take on UCF. The Rebels held the lead the entire game, giving the Knights their first loss in their new arena. Ole Miss then traveled to the state capital, Jackson, on December 13 for the first time since 1989 to play Winthrop at the Mississippi Coliseum, where they defeated the Eagles by a score of 76–71 after trailing by as much as 7 in the second half.

==== San Juan Shootout ====
The Rebels traveled to the Mario Morales Coliseum in Guaynabo, Puerto Rico, for the 2007 San Juan Shootout. Their first game was on December 20 against DePaul. Despite trailing 31–27 in the first half, the Rebels prevailed, 69–63, in a game that saw 11 lead changes between the two teams. Ole Miss held the Blue Demons to only six field goals in the second half, with none scored in the final nine minutes. The following day, Ole Miss defeated La Salle by a score of 84–77, despite blowing a 42–29 halftime lead and allowing the Explorers to take the lead several times in the second half.

In the final, the Rebels took on their first ranked opponent of the season, No. 15 Clemson, who were also unbeaten up to this point. The Rebels started the game with an 8-2 scoring run en route to a 48–40 halftime lead. Clemson, however, took the lead, 54–53, with 13 minutes left in the second half. An 8-point unanswered scoring run by Ole Miss would reclaim them the lead, 80–78, with under three minutes to go. They wouldn't relinquish it and won the game by a score of 85–83, marking Ole Miss' eleventh straight victory and starting the season 11-0 for only the third time in the program's history.

Following their Puerto Rico tour, now-ranked Ole Miss traveled to the DeSoto Civic Center in Southaven, Mississippi on December 28, to take on Southern Miss. They soundly defeated the Golden Eagles, 78–58, and became the first Rebels team to start a season 12–0 and tied the record for longest winning streak, previously set by the 1926 team. For their final game before SEC conference play and their first game of the new year, Ole Miss hosted Alabama A&M on January 2. The Rebels thoroughly defeated the Bulldogs, 87–50, to break the record for longest win streak in Rebel basketball history.

=== Early conference matchups ===
Now one of the NCAA's last six undefeated teams, Ole Miss traveled to the Food City Center in Knoxville, Tennessee on January 9, to take on No. 8 Tennessee. Down by 12 with eleven minutes left in the second half, the Rebels took an 83–79 lead late in the game. The Volunteers came back and tied it at 83. With 4.2 seconds left in the game, Tyler Smith hit a lay-up to give Tennessee the 85–83 victory and hand Ole Miss their first loss. The Rebels bounced back after this loss, defeating LSU 74–71 on January 12, and Florida 89–87 on January 16, their first win against the Gators since 2002.

The Rebels then embarked on a two-game road trip, first against Auburn at the Beard–Eaves–Memorial Coliseum in Auburn, Alabama on January 19. After a neck-and-neck game, the Rebels lost to the Tigers, 80–77. Seven days later, the Rebels traveled to in-state rivals Mississippi State at the Humphrey Coliseum in Starkville. The Bulldogs dominated the Rebels, winning by a score of 88–68.

The Rebels returned to Oxford and faced No. 19 Vanderbilt on January 30, defeating the slumping Commodores with a commanding 74–58 victory. Three days later, the Rebels hosted South Carolina. Ole Miss trailed for most of the game, but took a 77–75 lead late in the second half. The Gamecocks tied it 77-77, before Gamecock forward Dominique Archie scored the game-winning three-pointer with 5.9 seconds left, giving South Carolina the 80–77 upset. The woes continued for Ole Miss after travelling to Bud Walton Arena in Fayetteville, Arkansas on February 9, to take on Arkansas. The Rebels nearly came back from their early 14-point deficit, but were ultimately defeated 75–69.

=== Later conference matchups ===
Two days removed from their loss at Arkansas, Ole Miss hosted Presbyterian in their final non-conference game of the year. The Rebels won convincingly by a score of 66–55, making Ole Miss undefeated in the regular season against their non-conference opponents. Two days later, the Rebels traveled to the Coleman Coliseum to take on Alabama in Tuscaloosa. The Rebels were shut down on the court, trailing by as much as 14 as the Crimson Tide won 76–67.

On February 16, Ole Miss hosted Auburn for their second match-up of the season. Despite leading 43–42 at half-time, the Rebels lost 90–78, giving Auburn the season sweep. However, their fortunes changed four days later when they faced off against Mississippi State at home, defeating the Bulldogs 74–63 to split the season series against them. Despite this victory, Ole Miss dropped their next two: losing 69–49 against LSU on February 23 at the Pete Maravich Assembly Center in Baton Rouge to split the season series, then dropping another four days later against Kentucky at the Rupp Arena in Lexington, by a score of 58–54.

For their final homestand, Ole Miss hosted Alabama on March 1, narrowly defeating the Tide 91–88 after a missed Crimson Tide three-pointer. The game ended with 2.5 seconds left on the clock, with the referees claiming a timing error had occurred. With the win, the Rebels ended up splitting the season series. Three days later, they hosted Arkansas, defeating the Razorbacks 81–72, splitting that season series as well. For their final regular season game, the Rebels traveled to Stegeman Coliseum to take on Georgia in Athens on March 8. With their 76–62 victory, the Rebels won their first and only road conference victory of the season.

== Postseason ==
=== SEC conference tournament ===
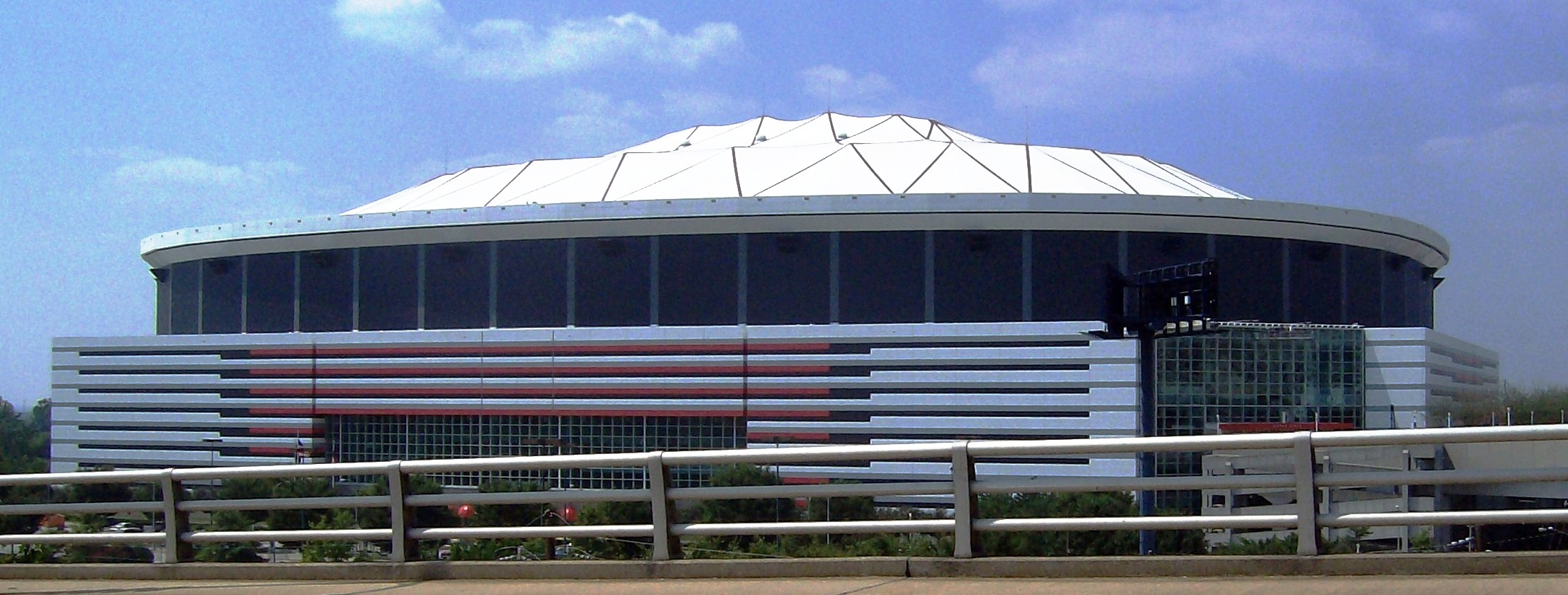
The 2008 SEC tournament was held at the Georgia Dome.

The Rebels entered the 2008 SEC men's basketball tournament with a 21–9 record, good for the third seed in the western division. This placed them against the eastern division's sixth-seed, Georgia, in the first round. Five days prior, the Rebels had soundly defeated the Bulldogs by 14 points, however, this postseason matchup was much more competitive. Trailing 81–84 in the second half, Rebels guard David Huertas made three free throws to send the game into overtime. With five seconds left in overtime, guard Chris Warren also sank three free throws to tie the game at 95 apiece. However, with just 0.4 seconds left on the clock, Georgia center Dave Bliss made a 10-foot jumper, advancing Georgia to the second round. The Bulldogs eventually won the tournament, securing a bid to the 2008 NCAA Division I men's basketball tournament.

=== National Invitation Tournament ===
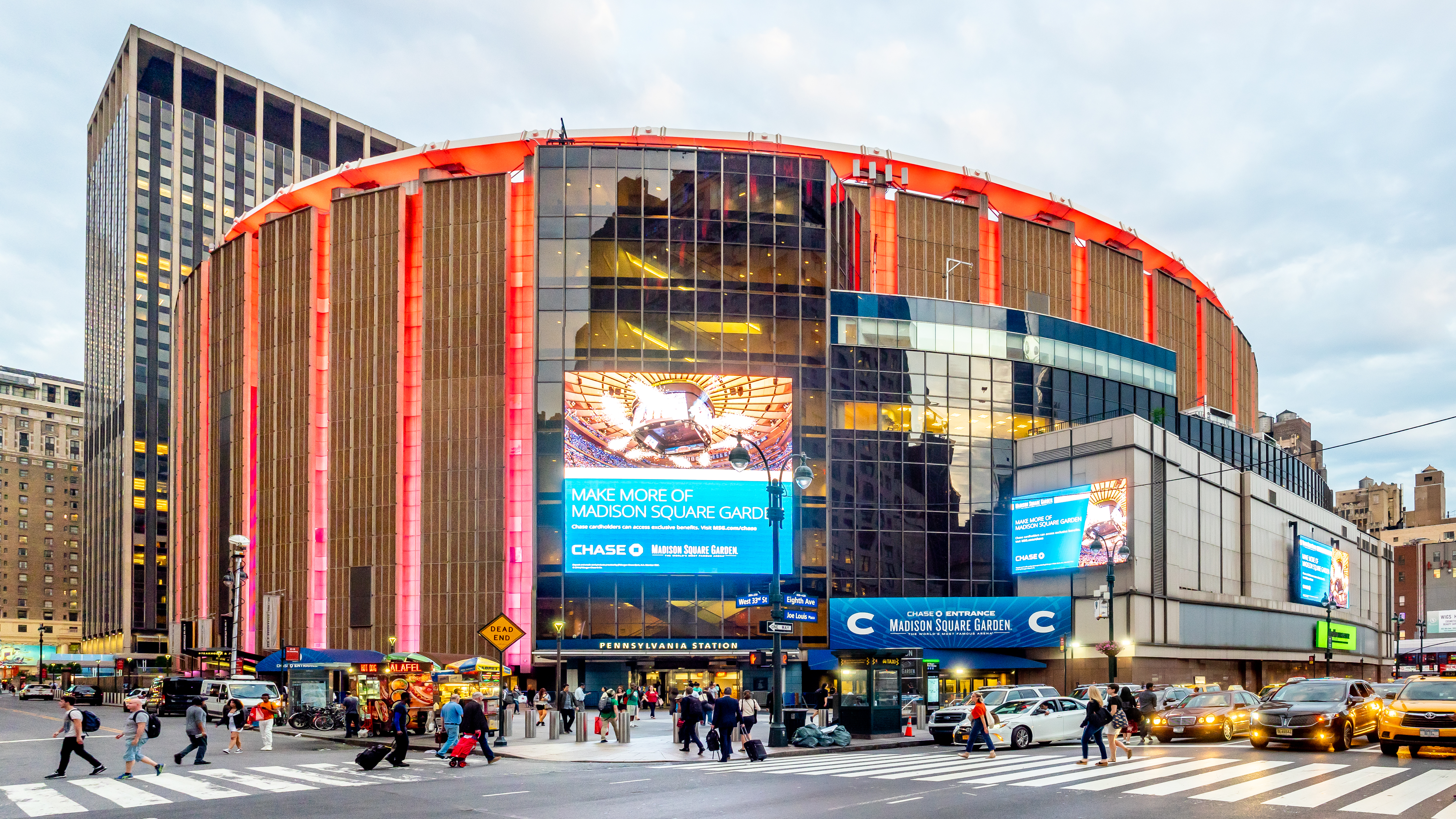
The semifinals and finals of the NIT were held at Madison Square Garden.

After not receiving a bid to the 2008 NCAA tournament, the Rebels accepted a bid to participate in the 2008 National Invitation Tournament, where they would play as a second seed. On March 19, in the first round of the tournament, Ole Miss defeated visiting UC Santa Barbara, 83–68, coming back from a 6–17 deficit early in the first half.

The Rebels' second round matchup pitted them against third-seeded Nebraska. While Nebraska trailed for most of regulation, they tied up the game at 70 with 39 seconds left, bringing the game to overtime. The Rebels commanded the overtime period, however, with Zach Graham scoring 10 points as they defeated the Huskers, 85–75.

Following the win, the Rebels traveled to Blacksburg, Virginia, for a quarterfinal matchup against the one-seed, Virginia Tech. With 10:49 left in the second half, the Rebels led 51–49 before a 9–0 scoring run in the following two minutes. Following that, the lead never got below seven points, and the Rebels finished with the upset win, defeating the Hokies, 81–72, led in large part by Chris Warren's 22-point performance. This win, the 24th of the season, made the 2007–08 season the second-winningest in program history.

Following their victory in Blacksburg, the Rebels traveled to Madison Square Garden in New York City for their semifinal matchup against Ohio State. The team struggled in the first half of the game, trailing by a deficit of 24 at halftime. While in the second half the Rebels narrowed the gap, the closest the Rebels ever got to reclaiming the lead was when they trailed 68–75 with 1:32 remaining in the second half. The game ended 81–69, with Ohio State eventually winning the tournament.

== Schedule ==
Date time, TV	Rank^{#}	Opponent^{#}	Result	Record	Site (attendance) city, state
Exhibition
November 2*; 7:00pm		Delta State	W 110–65	–	Tad Smith Coliseum; Oxford, Mississippi
Regular Season
November 10*; 2:00pm		Mississippi Valley State	W 97–63	1–0	Tad Smith Coliseum (5,833); Oxford, Mississippi
November 13*; 7:00pm		South Alabama	W 81–78	2–0	Tad Smith Coliseum (5,737); Oxford, Mississippi
November 16*; 7:00pm		Lamar	W 108–70	3–0	Tad Smith Coliseum (6,864); Oxford, Mississippi
November 24*; 2:00pm		Louisiana–Monroe	W 94–70	4–0	Tad Smith Coliseum (5,843); Oxford, Mississippi
November 27*; 7:00pm		Troy	W 102–76	5–0	Tad Smith Coliseum (5,949); Oxford, Mississippi
December 1*; 1:00pm		New Mexico	W 85–77	6–0	Tad Smith Coliseum (6,731); Oxford, Mississippi
December 8*; 7:00pm, CSS		at UCF	W 76–67	7–0	UCF Arena (5,574); Orlando, Florida
December 13*; 7:00pm, CSS		vs. Winthrop	W 76–71	8–0	Mississippi Coliseum (4,413); Jackson, Mississippi
December 20*; 6:30pm		vs. DePaul; San Juan Shootout	W 69–63	9–0	Mario Morales Coliseum (207); San Juan, Puerto Rico
December 21*; 6:30pm		vs. La Salle; San Juan Shootout	W 84–77	10–0	Mario Morales Coliseum (205); San Juan, Puerto Rico
December 22*; 6:30pm		vs. No. 15 Clemson; San Juan Shootout	W 85–82	11–0	Mario Morales Coliseum (324); San Juan, Puerto Rico
December 28*; 7:00pm	No. 22	vs. Southern Miss	W 78–58	12–0	DeSoto Civic Center (7,200); Southaven, Mississippi
January 2*; 7:00pm	No. 18	Alabama A&M	W 86–50	13–0	Tad Smith Coliseum (6,645); Oxford, Mississippi
January 9; 7:00pm, Raycom	No. 16	at No. 8 Tennessee	L 83–85	13–1	Food City Center (21,846); Knoxville, Tennessee
January 12; 5:00pm, FSN South	No. 16	LSU	W 74–71	14–1	Tad Smith Coliseum (9,328); Oxford, Mississippi
January 16; 7:00pm, Raycom	No. 18	Florida	W 89–87	15–1	Tad Smith Coliseum (9,304); Oxford, Mississippi
January 19; 4:00pm, FSN South	No. 18	at Auburn	L 77–80	15–2	Beard–Eaves–Memorial Coliseum (6,058); Auburn, Alabama
January 26; 4:00pm, FSN South	No. 17	at Mississippi State	L 68–88	15–3	Humphrey Coliseum (9,905); Starkville, Mississippi
January 30; 7:00pm	No. 24	No. 19 Vanderbilt	W 74–58	16–3	Tad Smith Coliseum (8,886); Oxford, Mississippi
February 2; 4:00pm, SportSouth	No. 24	South Carolina	L 77–80	16–4	Tad Smith Coliseum (9,109); Oxford, Mississippi
February 9; 4:05pm, SportSouth		at Arkansas	L 69–75	16–5	Bud Walton Arena (19,916); Fayetteville, Arkansas
February 11*; 7:00pm		Presbyterian	W 66–55	17–5	Tad Smith Coliseum (6,621); Oxford, Mississippi
February 13; 7:00pm		at Alabama	L 67–76	17–6	Coleman Coliseum (9,230); Tuscaloosa, Alabama
February 16; 4:00pm, FSN South		Auburn	L 78–90	17–7	Tad Smith Coliseum (9,082); Oxford, Mississippi
February 20; 7:00pm, CSS		Mississippi State	W 74–63	18–7	Tad Smith Coliseum (9,167); Oxford, Mississippi
February 23; 5:00pm, FSN South		at LSU	L 49–69	18–8	Pete Maravich Assembly Center (8,765); Baton Rouge, Louisiana
February 27; 7:00pm, Raycom		at Kentucky	L 54–58	18–9	Rupp Arena (23,330); Lexington, Kentucky
March 1; 1:00pm, Raycom		Alabama	W 91–88	19–9	Tad Smith Coliseum (8,908); Oxford, Mississippi
March 4; 8:00pm, ESPN		Arkansas	W 81–72	20–9	Tad Smith Coliseum (8,168); Oxford, Mississippi
March 8; 3:00pm		at Georgia	W 76–62	21–9	Stegeman Coliseum (7,774); Athens, Georgia
SEC tournament
March 13; 8:45pm, Raycom	(W3)	vs. (E6) Georgia	L 95–97 ^{OT}	21–10	Georgia Dome (15,563); Atlanta, Georgia
National Invitation Tournament
March 19*; 7:00pm, ESPNU	(2)	(7) UC Santa Barbara; First Round – Virginia Tech bracket	W 83–68	22–10	Tad Smith Coliseum (4,089); Oxford, Mississippi
March 24*; 8:00pm, ESPNU	(2)	(3) Nebraska; Second Round – Virginia Tech bracket	W 85–75 ^{OT}	23–10	Tad Smith Coliseum (5,149); Oxford, Mississippi
March 26*; 6:00pm, ESPN2	(2)	at (1) Virginia Tech; Quarterfinals – Virginia Tech bracket	W 81–72	24–10	Cassell Coliseum (9,615); Blacksburg, Virginia
April 1*; 8:00pm, ESPN2	(2)	vs. (1) Ohio State; Semifinals	L 69–81	24–11	Madison Square Garden (9,823); New York City, New York
*Non-conference game. ^{#}Rankings from AP Poll. (#) Tournament seedings in parentheses. All times are in Central Time.

== Rankings ==
On December 3, the Rebels received four votes in the AP poll. This marked the first time Ole Miss received votes since the January 16, 2006 poll. Three weeks later, on December 21, the Rebels were ranked in the top 25 for the first time since the 2000–01 season.

Ranking movement Legend: ██ Improvement in ranking. ██ Decrease in ranking. ██ Not ranked the previous week. RV=Others receiving votes.
Poll	Pre	Wk 1	Wk 2	Wk 3	Wk 4	Wk 5	Wk 6	Wk 7	Wk 8	Wk 9	Wk 10	Wk 11	Wk 12	Wk 13	Wk 14	Wk 15	Wk 16	WK 17	Wk 18	Final
AP	--	--	--	--	--	RV	RV	RV	22	18	16	18	17	24	RV	--	--	--	--	
Coaches	--	--	--	--	--	--	RV	RV	24	18	15	15	15	22	RV	RV	--	--	--	--

== Honors ==
=== In-season ===
During the year, Ole Miss players won honors from the Southeastern Conference several times. Chris Warren won SEC Freshman of the Week honors on December 3, December 24, and February 3. Dwayne Curtis won SEC Player of the Week on December 17. Warren was also named the MVP of the 2007 San Juan Shootout, as well as The Birmingham News' mid-season SEC Freshman of the Year winner.

=== End-of-year ===
Dwayne Curtis was named All-District by the National Association of Basketball Coaches, which placed him on the second team of District 6. Curtis had earned All-District honors his sophomore year as well, making him the tenth Rebel to win All-District honors in multiple years.

On March 11, the Southeastern Conference named their 2007–08 season award winners. Dwayne Curtis earned second-team All-SEC honors, while both Chris Warren and Trevor Gaskins earned SEC All-Freshman honors. Curtis' selection denoted his second All-SEC selection in his career, while Warren's selection was the only one of the Rebel trio to be unanimous.

Curtis was also named as one of three finalists for the Howell Trophy, honoring Mississippi's best men's college basketball player of the year. The award was won by Jamont Gordon of Mississippi State.
