= 2007–08 Tennessee Volunteers basketball team =

American college basketball season

2007–08 Tennessee Volunteers men's basketball

SEC regular season champions

NCAA tournament, Sweet Sixteen
- Conference: Southeastern Conference
- East

Ranking
- Coaches: No. 7
- AP: No. 5
- Record: 31–5 (14–2 SEC)
- Head coach: Bruce Pearl (3rd season)
- Assistant coaches: Tony Jones; Steve Forbes; Jason Shay
- Home arena: Thompson–Boling Arena

2007–08 Southeastern Conference men's basketball standings
	Conf.				Overall
Team	W		L	PCT	W		L	PCT
East
No. 5 Tennessee	14	–	2	.875	31	–	5	.861
Kentucky	12	–	4	.750	18	–	13	.581
No. 19 Vanderbilt	10	–	6	.625	26	–	8	.765
Florida	8	–	8	.500	24	–	12	.667
South Carolina	5	–	11	.313	14	–	18	.438
Georgia †	4	–	12	.250	17	–	17	.500
West
Mississippi State	12	–	4	.750	23	–	11	.676
Arkansas	9	–	7	.563	23	–	12	.657
Ole Miss	7	–	9	.438	24	–	11	.686
LSU	6	–	10	.375	13	–	18	.419
Alabama	5	–	11	.313	17	–	16	.515
Auburn	4	–	12	.250	14	–	16	.467
† 2008 SEC tournament winner As of April 7, 2008; Rankings from AP Poll

The 2007–08 Tennessee Volunteers basketball team represented the University of Tennessee in the 2008-09 NCAA Division I men's basketball season. To begin a highly touted year, the team traveled to Europe and played a few European teams going 4–1 against them. The Vols were hurt when sophomore forward Duke Crews was suspended. Crews suffered a 30-day suspension, and then missed both exhibition games with an ankle injury. Tennessee's first exhibition game was against the California-Pennsylvania Vulcans, winning handily, 106–46. Crews also missed about a month due to heart problems. The Vols finished 31–5, winning the SEC regular season championship, for the first time since 2000, but the Vols lost in the 3rd round of both the SEC and NCAA Tournament.

== Roster ==
Name	Number	Team Position	Height	Year
Ramar Smith	12	1	6–1	Sophomore
JaJuan Smith	2	2	6–2	Senior
Chris Lofton- C	5	3	6–2	Senior
Tyler Smith	1	4	6–7	Sophomore
Wayne Chism	4	5	6–9	Sophomore
J. P. Prince	30	6	6–7	Sophomore
Jordan Howell	15	7	6–3	Senior
Brian Williams	33	8	6–10	Freshman
Duke Crews	32	9	6–8	Sophomore
Ryan Childress	34	10	6–9	Junior
Josh Tabb	25	11	6–4	Sophomore

Legend: C = Team Captain

Non-Scholarship Players

Steven Pearl, Quinn Cannington, Tanner Wild, Rick Daniels-Mulholland, Justin Jackson, Brett Jackson

Coaches

Head Coach: Bruce Pearl, Associate Coach: Tony Jones, Assistant Coach: Steve Forbes, Assistant Coach: Jason Shay, Director of Basketball Operations: Ken Johnson

== Schedule and results ==
Date time, TV	Rank^{#}	Opponent^{#}	Result	Record	Site (attendance) city, state
Exhibition
November 2*; 7:30 pm	No. 7	Cal U	W 106–46	–	Thompson–Boling Arena (–); Knoxville, Tennessee
November 5*; 7:30 pm	No. 7	LMU	W 124–61	–	Thompson–Boling Arena (–); Knoxville, Tennessee
Non-conference regular season
November 9*; 7:30 pm, FSN South	No. 7	Temple	W 80–63	1–0	Thompson–Boling Arena (21,817); Knoxville, Tennessee
November 14*; 7:30 pm	No. 7	Arkansas–Monticello; Legends Classic Regionals	W 101–44	2–0	Thompson–Boling Arena (17,946); Knoxville, Tennessee
November 16*; 7:30 pm	No. 7	Prairie View A&M; Legends Classic Regionals	W 89–75	3–0	Thompson–Boling Arena (18,846); Knoxville, Tennessee
November 20*; 7:30 pm, SportSouth	No. 7	MTSU	W 109–40	4–0	Thompson–Boling Arena (18,592); Knoxville, Tennessee
November 23*; 9:00 pm, Versus	No. 7	vs. West Virginia; Legends Classic Semifinals	W 74–72	5–0	Prudential Center (5,310); Newark, New Jersey
November 24*; 6:00 pm, Versus	No. 7	vs. No. 15 Texas; Legends Classic Finals	L 78–97	5–1	Prudential Center (4,327); Newark, New Jersey
November 27*; 7:30 pm, SportSouth	No. 11	North Carolina A&T	W 93–59	6–1	Thompson–Boling Arena (17,092); Knoxville, Tennessee
November 30*; 7:30 pm	No. 11	Louisiana–Lafayette	W 98–70	7–1	Thompson–Boling Arena (19,401); Knoxville, Tennessee
December 4*; 7:00 pm	No. 10	at Chattanooga	W 76–70	8–1	McKenzie Arena (11,221); Chattanooga, Tennessee
December 15*; 9:30 pm, ESPNU	No. 12	vs. Western Kentucky; Sun Belt Classic	W 88–82	9–1	Sommet Center (18,071); Nashville, Tennessee
December 19*; 7:30 pm, SportSouth	No. 12	UNC Asheville	W 79–77	10–1	Thompson–Boling Arena (21,314); Knoxville, Tennessee
December 22*; 2:00 pm, ESPN	No. 12	at Xavier	W 82-75	11–1	Cintas Center (21,863); Cincinnati
December 29*; 4:00 pm, ESPN2	No. 11	vs. Gonzaga; Battle in Seattle	W 82–72	12–1	KeyArena (15,141); Seattle
SEC regular season
January 9; 8:00 pm, Raycom	No. 8	Ole Miss	W 85–83	13–1 (1–0)	Thompson–Boling Arena (21,846); Knoxville, Tennessee
January 12; 8:00 pm, FSN South	No. 8	at South Carolina	W 80–56	14–1 (2–0)	Colonial Life Arena (13,449); Columbia, South Carolina
January 17; 7:00 pm, ESPN	No. 6	Vanderbilt	W 80–60	15–1 (3–0)	Thompson–Boling Arena (20,799); Knoxville, Tennessee
January 19*; 3:30 pm, CBS	No. 6	Ohio State	W 76–63	16–1	Thompson–Boling Arena (14,057); Knoxville, Tennessee
January 22; 9:00 pm, ESPN	No. 3	at Kentucky	L 66–72	16–2 (3–1)	Rupp Arena (23,443); Lexington, Kentucky
January 26; 7:00 pm, FSN South	No. 3	Georgia	W 85–69	17–2 (4–1)	Thompson–Boling Arena (21,009); Knoxville, Tennessee
January 29; 9:00 pm, ESPN	No. 7	at Alabama	W 93–88	18–2 (5–1)	Coleman Coliseum (11,891); Tuscaloosa, Alabama
February 2; 7:00 pm, FSN South	No. 7	at Mississippi State	W 76–71	19–2 (6–1)	Humphrey Coliseum (10,150); Starkville, Mississippi
February 5; 9:00 pm, ESPN	No. 7	Florida	W 104–82	20–2 (7–1)	Thompson–Boling Arena (20,036); Knoxville, Tennessee
February 9; 3:00 pm, Raycom	No. 7	at LSU	W 47–45	21–2 (8–1)	Pete Maravich Assembly Center (10,165); Baton Rouge, Louisiana
February 13; 8:00 pm	No. 3	Arkansas	W 93–71	22–2 (9–1)	Thompson–Boling Arena (20,008); Knoxville, Tennessee
February 16; 3:00 pm, Raycom	No. 3	at Georgia	W 74–71	23–2 (10–1)	Stegeman Coliseum (10,039); Athens, Georgia
February 20; 7:30 pm	No. 2	Auburn	W 89–70	24–2 (11–1)	Thompson–Boling Arena (20,645); Knoxville, Tennessee
February 23*; 9:00 pm, ESPN	No. 2	at No. 1 Memphis; ESPN College GameDay	W 66–62	25–2	FedExForum (18,389); Memphis, Tennessee
February 26; 9:00 pm, ESPN	No. 1	at No. 18 Vanderbilt	L 69–72	25–3 (11–2)	Memorial Gymnasium (14,325); Nashville, Tennessee
March 2; 12:00 pm, CBS	No. 1	Kentucky	W 63–60	26–3 (12–2)	Thompson–Boling Arena (21,628); Knoxville, Tennessee
March 5; 9:00 pm, Raycom	No. 4	at Florida	W 89–86	27–3 (13–2)	O'Connell Center (12,046); Gainesville, Florida
March 9; 2:00 pm, Raycom	No. 4	South Carolina	W 89–56	28–3 (14–2)	Thompson–Boling Arena (21,734); Knoxville, Tennessee
SEC Tournament
March 14; 1:00 pm, Raycom	No. 5	vs. South Carolina; SEC Quarterfinals	W 89–87	29–3	Georgia Dome (18,020); Atlanta
March 15; 1:00 pm, Raycom	No. 5	vs. Arkansas; SEC Semifinals	L 91–92	29–4	Alexander Memorial Coliseum (2,517); Atlanta
NCAA tournament
March 21*; 12:15 pm, CBS	(2 E) No. 5	vs. (15 E) American University; First Round	W 72–57	30–4	BJCC Arena (–); Birmingham, Alabama
March 23*; 2:30 pm, CBS	(2 E) No. 5	vs. (7 E) No. 11 Butler; Second Round	W 76–71 ^{OT}	31–4	BJCC Arena (–); Birmingham, Alabama
March 27*; 9:57 pm, CBS	(2 E) No. 5	vs. (3 E) No. 13 Louisville; Sweet Sixteen	L 60–79	31–5	Charlotte Bobcats Arena (19,092); Charlotte, North Carolina
*Non-conference game. ^{#}Rankings from AP Poll. (#) Tournament seedings in parentheses. All times are in Eastern Time.
