= 2007–08 Georgia Bulldogs basketball team =

American college basketball season

2007–08 Georgia Bulldogs basketball

SEC tournament champions

NCAA tournament, first round
- Conference: Southeastern Conference
- Record: 17–17 (4–12 SEC)
- Head coach: Dennis Felton (5th season)
- Assistant coaches: Pete Herrmann; Mike Jones; Desmond Oliver
- Home arena: Stegeman Coliseum

2007–08 Southeastern Conference men's basketball standings
	Conf.				Overall
Team	W		L	PCT	W		L	PCT
East
No. 5 Tennessee	14	–	2	.875	31	–	5	.861
Kentucky	12	–	4	.750	18	–	13	.581
No. 19 Vanderbilt	10	–	6	.625	26	–	8	.765
Florida	8	–	8	.500	24	–	12	.667
South Carolina	5	–	11	.313	14	–	18	.438
Georgia †	4	–	12	.250	17	–	17	.500
West
Mississippi State	12	–	4	.750	23	–	11	.676
Arkansas	9	–	7	.563	23	–	12	.657
Ole Miss	7	–	9	.438	24	–	11	.686
LSU	6	–	10	.375	13	–	18	.419
Alabama	5	–	11	.313	17	–	16	.515
Auburn	4	–	12	.250	14	–	16	.467
† 2008 SEC tournament winner As of April 7, 2008; Rankings from AP Poll

The 2007–08 Georgia Bulldogs basketball team represented the University of Georgia during the 2007–08 NCAA Division I men's basketball season. The team's head coach was Dennis Felton, who was in his fifth season at UGA. They played their home games at Stegeman Coliseum and were members of the Southeastern Conference. They finished the season 17–17, 4–12 in SEC play.

== 2008 SEC Tournament: The Dream Dawgs ==
In the 2007–2008 season, Georgia's men's basketball team came into the 2008 SEC men's basketball tournament with a 13–16 overall record and a 4–12 conference mark. At one point, the team sustained two five-game losing streaks during a 2-of-12 stretch in conference play. In the first round of the tournament, Georgia was slated to play Ole Miss, who had beaten the Bulldogs in the season-closer, securing the Rebels' only road SEC win of the season. The game went into overtime after Rebel David Huertas hit all three free throws after a three-point shooting foul, and looked to go into a second extra period after Chris Warren did the same. However, with 0.4 seconds left in overtime, Georgia senior Dave Bliss banked in the game-winner to shock the Rebels and send Georgia into a second-round matchup with Kentucky.

On the night of March 14, 2008, tornadoes hit Atlanta, in whose Georgia Dome the SEC Tournament was housed. The Georgia-Kentucky matchup was rescheduled for the early afternoon of March 15, 2008, with the winner advancing to play the SEC West's #1 seed, Mississippi State, later that evening. The remaining games in the tournament would be played at Alexander Memorial Coliseum, the basketball complex of Georgia Tech, UGA's in-state rival. Again playing an overtime game in which Georgia star Sundiata Gaines fouled out, Georgia freshman Zac Swansey hit a turnaround three-point jumper with 1.4 seconds left to give the Bulldogs the team's first ever win over Kentucky in the SEC Tournament. That night, Georgia defeated Mississippi State 64–60 to become the first team since Kentucky in 1952 to win two tournament games in one day, and the first-ever #6 seed from a division to advance to the modern (post-1992) SEC tournament finals.

In the finals, Georgia faced Arkansas, which had lost to Georgia 82–69 in the regular season. Georgia prevailed again, at one point leading the Razorbacks by nineteen points en route to winning its first tournament championship in 25 years. Sundiata Gaines and Terrance Woodbury were both named to the All-Tournament Team, with Gaines winning the tournament's MVP. The improbable list of achievements—winning the tournament as a 6-seed, playing two games in one day to reach the finals, playing two games (against Kentucky and Mississippi State) in which Gaines fouled out with a substantial amount of time to play, doing it on a rival's home court, and winning four consecutive elimination games following a season during which their longest winning streak stood at three—earned the 2007–2008 team the nickname of Dream Dawgs.

With the victory, Georgia secured itself an automatic bid in the 2008 NCAA tournament. Georgia's appearance in the tournament was the tenth overall in team history and the first since the 2002 NCAA basketball tournament. After their SEC Championship run, the Bulldogs were seeded 14th in the NCAA Tournament, playing against the #3 seeded Xavier Musketeers. After developing a lead early in the 2nd half, the Bulldogs could not hold on, as Xavier went on to win 73–61.

== Schedule and results ==
Date time, TV	Rank^{#}	Opponent^{#}	Result	Record	Site (attendance) city, state
Exhibition
11/03/2007*; 7:00 pm		Clayton State	W 90–56		Stegeman Coliseum; Athens, GA
Non-conference regular season
11/09/2007*; 9:00 pm		Jacksonville State	W 107–65	1–0	Stegeman Coliseum (7,446); Athens, GA
11/14/2007*; 7:30 pm		Grambling State	W 83–70	2–0	Stegeman Coliseum (6,309); Athens, GA
11/20/2007*; 7:30 pm		Elon	W 76–65	3–0	Stegeman Coliseum (6,246); Athens, GA
11/24/2007*; 6:30 pm		at Wisconsin	L 49–68	3–1	Kohl Center (17,190); Madison, WI
11/28/2007*; 7:00 pm		Delaware State	W 58–47	4–1	Stegeman Coliseum (6,288); Athens, GA
12/03/2007*; 7:30 pm		Augusta State	W 81–74	5–1	Stegeman Coliseum (6,502); Athens, GA
12/08/2007*; 2:00 pm		Wake Forest	W 72–50	6–1	Stegeman Coliseum (7,800); Athens, GA
12/20/2007*; 12:30 am		vs. East Tennessee State; Rainbow Classic	L 58–76	6–2	Stan Sheriff Center; Honolulu, HI
12/21/2007*; 6:30 pm		vs. Tulane; Rainbow Classic consolation	L 69–70	6–3	Stan Sheriff Center; Honolulu, HI
12/22/2007*; 4:00 pm		vs. Hawaii; Rainbow Classic 7th place game	W 67–59	7–3	Stan Sheriff Center; Honolulu, HI
12/30/2007*; 4:00 pm		Presbyterian	W 68–58	8–3	Stegeman Coliseum (7,268); Athens, GA
01/05/2008*; 4:00 pm		vs. Gonzaga; Ronald McDonald House Charities Classic	L 67–75	8–4	Spokane Arena (12,064); Spokane, WA
01/09/2008*; 7:30 pm		Georgia Tech	W 79–72	9–4	Stegeman Coliseum (10,503); Athens, GA
SEC regular season
01/12/2008; 2:00 pm		at Mississippi State	L 49–60	9–5 (0–1)	Humphrey Coliseum (8,713); Starkville, MS
01/16/2008; 7:30 pm		Alabama	W 61–54	10–5 (1–1)	Stegeman Coliseum (7,982); Athens, GA
01/19/2008; 7:00 pm		Arkansas	W 82–69	11–5 (2–1)	Stegeman Coliseum (8,322); Athens, GA
01/26/2008; 7:00 pm		at No. 3 Tennessee	L 69–85	11–6 (2–2)	Thompson–Boling Arena (21,099); Knoxville, Tennessee
01/30/2008; 7:30 pm		at South Carolina	L 56–62	11–7 (2–3)	Colonial Life Arena (11,876); Columbia, SC
02/02/2008; 1:00 pm		Kentucky	L 58–63	11–8 (2–4)	Stegeman Coliseum (10,313); Athens, GA
02/06/2008; 7:30 pm		No. 23 Vanderbilt	L 59–67	11–9 (2–5)	Stegeman Coliseum (6,788); Athens, GA
02/09/2008; 3:00 pm		at Florida	L 67–77	11–10 (2–6)	O'Connell Center (12,131); Gainesville, FL
02/13/2008; 7:30 pm		South Carolina	W 82–64	12–10 (3–6)	Stegeman Coliseum (6,897); Athens, GA
02/16/2008; 3:00 pm		No. 4 Tennessee	L 71–74	12–11 (3–7)	Stegeman Coliseum (10,039); Athens, GA
02/19/2008; 9:00 pm		at Kentucky	L 55–61	12–12 (3–8)	Rupp Arena (22,271); Lexington, KY
02/23/2008; 4:00 pm		at No. 20 Vanderbilt	L 74–86	12–13 (3–9)	Memorial Gymnasium (14,310); Nashville, TN
02/27/2008; 7:30 pm		Florida	L 64–77	12–14 (3–10)	Stegeman Coliseum (8,695); Athens, GA
03/02/2008; 2:00 pm		at LSU	L 64–71	12–15 (3–11)	Pete Maravich Assembly Center (8,130); Baton Rouge, LA
03/05/2008; 8:00 pm		at Auburn	W 59–54	13–15 (4–11)	Beard-Eaves-Memorial Coliseum (6,111); Auburn, AL
03/08/2008; 3:00 pm		Ole Miss	L 62–76	13–16 (4–12)	Stegeman Coliseum (7,774); Athens, GA
SEC tournament
03/13/2008; 9:45 pm	(E6)	vs. (W3) Ole Miss; First Round	W 97–95 ^{OT}	14–16	Georgia Dome (15,563); Atlanta, GA
03/15/2008; 12:00 pm	(E6)	vs. (E2) Kentucky; Second Round	W 60–56 ^{OT}	15–16	Alexander Memorial Coliseum (1,458); Atlanta, GA
03/15/2008; 8:30 pm	(E6)	vs. (W1) Mississippi State; Semifinals	W 64–60	16–16	Alexander Memorial Coliseum (2,517); Atlanta, GA
03/16/2008; 3:30 pm	(E6)	vs. (W2) Arkansas; Championship Game	W 66–57	17–16	Alexander Memorial Coliseum (3,700); Atlanta, GA
NCAA tournament
03/20/2008*; 12:20 pm	(14)	vs. (3) No. 12 Xavier; First round	L 61–73	17–17	Verizon Center; Washington, D.C.
*Non-conference game. ^{#}Rankings from AP Poll. (#) Tournament seedings in parentheses. E=East Region. All times are in Eastern Time.
