= 2007–08 Alabama Crimson Tide men's basketball team =

American college basketball season

2007–08 Alabama Crimson Tide men's basketball

Las Vegas Classic Champions
- Conference: Southeastern Conference
- Western Division
- Record: 17–16 (5–11 SEC)
- Head coach: Mark Gottfried (10th season)
- Assistant coaches: Philip Pearson; James Holland; Kobie Baker
- Home arena: Coleman Coliseum (Capacity: 15,316)

2007–08 Southeastern Conference men's basketball standings
	Conf.				Overall
Team	W		L	PCT	W		L	PCT
East
No. 5 Tennessee	14	–	2	.875	31	–	5	.861
Kentucky	12	–	4	.750	18	–	13	.581
No. 19 Vanderbilt	10	–	6	.625	26	–	8	.765
Florida	8	–	8	.500	24	–	12	.667
South Carolina	5	–	11	.313	14	–	18	.438
Georgia †	4	–	12	.250	17	–	17	.500
West
Mississippi State	12	–	4	.750	23	–	11	.676
Arkansas	9	–	7	.563	23	–	12	.657
Ole Miss	7	–	9	.438	24	–	11	.686
LSU	6	–	10	.375	13	–	18	.419
Alabama	5	–	11	.313	17	–	16	.515
Auburn	4	–	12	.250	14	–	16	.467
† 2008 SEC tournament winner As of April 7, 2008; Rankings from AP Poll

The 2007–08 Alabama Crimson Tide men's basketball team (variously "Alabama", "UA", "Bama" or "The Tide") represented the University of Alabama in the 2007–08 college basketball season. The head coach was Mark Gottfried, who was in his tenth season as Alabama. The team played its home games at Coleman Coliseum in Tuscaloosa, Alabama and was a member of the Southeastern Conference. This was the 95th season of basketball in the school's history. The Crimson Tide finished the season 17–16, 5–11 in SEC play, lost in the quarterfinals of the 2008 SEC men's basketball tournament and were invited to the 2008 College Basketball Invitational but decline the invitation.

== Schedule and results ==
Date time, TV	Rank^{#}	Opponent^{#}	Result	Record	Site (attendance) city, state
Exhibition
Nov. 5 2007*; 7:00 p.m.		North Alabama	W 99–71		Coleman Coliseum; Tuscaloosa, AL
Non-conference regular season
November 9, 2007*; 7:00 p.m.		Troy	W 84–72	1–0	Coleman Coliseum (9,724); Tuscaloosa, AL
November 13, 2007*; 6:30 p.m.		at Mercer	W 90–83	2–0	Hawkins Arena (3,280); Macon, GA
November 19, 2007*; 6:00 p.m.		Belmont	L 83–85	2–1	Coleman Coliseum (9,094); Tuscaloosa, AL
November 23, 2007*; 7:00 p.m.		Southern Miss	W 79–77	3–1	Coleman Coliseum (9,140); Tuscaloosa, AL
November 28, 2007*; 8:20 p.m., ESPNU		at No. 16 Texas A&M	L 63–76	3–2	Reed Arena (10,328); College Station, TX
December 1, 2007*; 6:00 p.m.		Southeastern Louisiana	W 63–61 ^{OT}	4–2	Coleman Coliseum (9,056); Tuscaloosa, AL
December 5, 2007*; 6:00 p.m., ESPN		vs. No. 5 Georgetown; Pizza Hut SEC/BIG EAST Invitational	L 60–70	4–3	BJCC Arena (10,411); Birmingham, AL
December 13, 2007*; 12:00 p.m.		Nicholls State	W 91–53	5–3	Coleman Coliseum (8,813); Tuscaloosa, AL
December 17, 2007*; 7:00 p.m.		Wofford; Las Vegas Classic campus site game	W 80–73	6–3	Coleman Coliseum (8,478); Tuscaloosa, AL
December 19, 2007*; 7:00 p.m.		Texas–Pan American; Las Vegas Classic campus site game	W 75–65	7–3	Coleman Coliseum (8,343); Tuscaloosa, AL
December 22, 2007*; 7:00 p.m.		vs. Missouri State; Las Vegas Classic	W 81–73	8–3	Orleans Arena (2,145); Las Vegas, NV
December 23, 2007*; 9:30 p.m.		vs. Iowa State; Las Vegas Classic	W 83–68	9–3	Orleans Arena (2,337); Las Vegas, NV
December 29, 2007*; 5:00 p.m.		George Washington	W 93–57	10–3	Coleman Coliseum (9,920); Tuscaloosa, AL
January 1, 2008*; 3:30 p.m.		No. 19 Clemson	L 61–87	10–4	Coleman Coliseum (9,316); Tuscaloosa, AL
January 4, 2008*; 7:00 p.m.		Chicago State	W 93–79	11–4	Coleman Coliseum (8,646); Tuscaloosa, AL
SEC regular season
January 8, 2008; 8:00 p.m., ESPN		Florida	L 83–90	11–5 (0–1)	Coleman Coliseum (12,401); Tuscaloosa, AL
January 13, 2008; 3:00 p.m., Raycom		at Arkansas	L 74–83 ^{OT}	11–6 (0–2)	Bud Walton Arena (19,153); Fayetteville, AR
January 16, 2008; 6:30 p.m.		at Georgia	L 54–61	11–7 (0–3)	Stegeman Coliseum (7,982); Athens, GA
January 19, 2008; 2:00 p.m.		Mississippi State	L 56–66	11–8 (0–4)	Coleman Coliseum (11,290); Tuscaloosa, AL
January 26, 2008; 2:00 p.m., Raycom		Auburn; Iron Bowl of basketball	W 97–77	12–8 (1–4)	Coleman Coliseum (15,316); Tuscaloosa, AL
January 20, 2008; 8:00 p.m., ESPN		No. 7 Tennessee	L 86–93	12–9 (1–5)	Coleman Coliseum (11,891); Tuscaloosa, AL
February 2, 2008; 2:00 p.m., Raycom		LSU	W 81–72	13–9 (2–5)	Coleman Coliseum (15,316); Tuscaloosa, AL
February 6, 2008; 7:00 p.m.		at Mississippi State	L 66–73	13–10 (2–6)	Humphrey Coliseum (9,730); Starkville, MS
February 9. 2008; 12:00 p.m., Raycom		at Kentucky	L 52–62	13–11 (2–7)	Rupp Arena (24,190); Lexington, Kentucky
February 13, 2008; 7:00 p.m.		Ole Miss	W 76–67	14–11 (3–7)	Coleman Coliseum (9,230); Tuscaloosa, AL
February 16, 2008; 6:00 p.m.		at South Carolina	L 65–67	14–12 (3–8)	Colonial Center (13,336); Columbia, South Carolina
February 24, 2008; 1:00 p.m.		at Auburn; Iron Bowl of basketball	L 76–88	14–13 (3–9)	Beard-Eaves-Memorial Coliseum (10,500); Auburn, AL
February 27, 2008; 7:00 p.m., Raycom		Arkansas	W 59–56	15–13 (4–9)	Coleman Coliseum (9,164); Tuscaloosa, AL
March 1, 2008; 1:00 p.m.		at Mississippi	L 88–91	15–14 (4–10)	Tad Smith Coliseum (8,908); Oxford, MS
March 5, 2008; 7:00 p.m.		at LSU	L 74–80	15–15 (4–11)	Pete Maravich Assembly Center (9,136); Baton Rouge, LA
March 8, 2008; 1:00 p.m., Raycom		No. 16 Vanderbilt	W 78–73 ^{OT}	16–15 (5–11)	Coleman Coliseum (11,462); Tuscaloosa, AL
SEC tournament
March 13, 2008; 6:30 p.m., Raycom	(W5)	vs. (E4) Florida; First Round	W 80–69	17–15	Georgia Dome; Atlanta, GA
March 14, 2008; 6:30 p.m., Raycom	(W5)	vs. (W1) Mississippi State; Quarterfinals	L 67–69 ^{OT}	17–16	Georgia Dome; Atlanta, GA
*Non-conference game. ^{#}Rankings from AP Poll. (#) Tournament seedings in parentheses. All times are in Central Time.

== See also ==
- 2008 NCAA Men's Division I Basketball Tournament
- 2007–08 NCAA Division I men's basketball season
- 2007–08 NCAA Division I men's basketball rankings
