= 2007–08 Kentucky Wildcats men's basketball team =

2007–08 season of University of Kentucky men's basketball team

2007–08 Kentucky Wildcats men's basketball

NCAA tournament, Round of 64
- Conference: Southeastern Conference
- Eastern
- Record: 18–13 (12–4 SEC)
- Head coach: Billy Gillispie (1st season)
- Assistant coaches: Jeremy Cox; Glynn Cyprien; Tracy Webster
- Home arena: Rupp Arena

2007–08 Southeastern Conference men's basketball standings
	Conf.				Overall
Team	W		L	PCT	W		L	PCT
East
No. 5 Tennessee	14	–	2	.875	31	–	5	.861
Kentucky	12	–	4	.750	18	–	13	.581
No. 19 Vanderbilt	10	–	6	.625	26	–	8	.765
Florida	8	–	8	.500	24	–	12	.667
South Carolina	5	–	11	.313	14	–	18	.438
Georgia †	4	–	12	.250	17	–	17	.500
West
Mississippi State	12	–	4	.750	23	–	11	.676
Arkansas	9	–	7	.563	23	–	12	.657
Ole Miss	7	–	9	.438	24	–	11	.686
LSU	6	–	10	.375	13	–	18	.419
Alabama	5	–	11	.313	17	–	16	.515
Auburn	4	–	12	.250	14	–	16	.467
† 2008 SEC tournament winner As of April 7, 2008; Rankings from AP Poll

The 2007–08 Kentucky Wildcats men's basketball team represented the University of Kentucky in the college basketball season of 2007–08. The team's head coach was Billy Gillispie. It was his 1st year as Kentucky's head coach. The Wildcats played their home games at Rupp Arena in Lexington, Kentucky. The highlights of the season were the unranked Wildcats upsetting the #3 ranked Tennessee Volunteers 72–66, and pushing the then ranked #1 Vols to the final seconds in a 63–60 loss at Tennessee.

== Roster ==
2007–08 Kentucky Wildcats men's basketball team
Players
Coaches

Pos.	#	Name	Height	Weight	Year	Previous school	Hometown
G	3	Ramel Bradley	6 ft 2 in (1.88 m)	191 lb (87 kg)	Sr	IMG Academy	Brooklyn, New York
G	5	Derrick Jasper	6 ft 6 in (1.98 m)	213 lb (97 kg)	So	Paso Robles	Paso Robles, California
G	12	Mark Krebs	6 ft 5 in (1.96 m)	207 lb (94 kg)	So	Newport Central Catholic	Newport, Kentucky
G	13	Michael Porter	6 ft 3 in (1.91 m)	198 lb (90 kg)	So	Modesto Christian	Modesto, California
F	15	A.J. Stewart	6 ft 7 in (2.01 m)	218 lb (99 kg)	Fr	Arlington Country Day	Jacksonville, Florida
F	21	Perry Stevenson	6 ft 9 in (2.06 m)	215 lb (98 kg)	So	Lafayette	Lafayette, Louisiana
G	23	Jodie Meeks	6 ft 4 in (1.93 m)	208 lb (94 kg)	So	Norcross	Norcross, Georgia
C	25	Moraykinyo Williams	6 ft 11 in (2.11 m)	270 lb (122 kg)	Fr	Bishop Ireton	Alexandria, Virginia
G	30	Dwight Perry	6 ft 1 in (1.85 m)	187 lb (85 kg)	So	Southern	Durham, North Carolina
G	32	Joe Crawford	6 ft 5 in (1.96 m)	207 lb (94 kg)	Sr	Renaissance	Detroit, Michigan
F	34	Ramon Harris	6 ft 7 in (2.01 m)	218 lb (99 kg)	So	West Anchorage	Anchorage, Alaska
F	42	Mark Coury	6 ft 8 in (2.03 m)	238 lb (108 kg)	So	Detroit Country Day	Detroit, Michigan
C	43	Jared Carter	7 ft 2 in (2.18 m)	277 lb (126 kg)	Jr	Scott County	Georgetown, Kentucky
F	54	Patrick Patterson	6 ft 9 in (2.06 m)	235 lb (107 kg)	Fr	Huntington	Huntington, West Virginia

Head coach

- Billy Gillispie (Texas State)

Assistant coach(es)

- Tracy Webster (Wisconsin)
- Glynn Cyprien (Southern)
- Jeremy Cox (Mesa State)

Legend

- (C) Team captain
- (S) Suspended
- (I) Ineligible
- (W) Walk-on
- Injured
- Current redshirt

=== 2007 signees ===
College recruiting (2007)
Name	Hometown	School	Height	Weight	Commit date
Alex Legion; G	Beverly Hills, Michigan	Oak Hill Academy	6 ft 4 in (1.93 m)	199 lb (90 kg)	Apr 24, 2007
Alex Legion; G	Recruit ratings: Scout: Rivals: (97)				
Patrick Patterson; F	Huntington, West Virginia	Huntington High School	6 ft 9 in (2.06 m)	235 lb (107 kg)	May 16, 2007
Patrick Patterson; F	Recruit ratings: Scout: Rivals: (97)				
A.J. Stewart; F	Jacksonville, Florida	Arlington Country Day High School	6 ft 7 in (2.01 m)	218 lb (99 kg)	Oct 15, 2006
A.J. Stewart; F	Recruit ratings: Scout: Rivals: (93)				
Mike Williams; C	Alexandria, Virginia	Bishop Ireton High School	7 ft 0 in (2.13 m)	270 lb (120 kg)	Sep 28, 2006
Mike Williams; C	Recruit ratings: Scout: Rivals:				
Morakinyo Williams; C	Alexandria, Virginia	Bishop Ireton High School	6 ft 11 in (2.11 m)	270 lb (120 kg)	Nov 14, 2006
Morakinyo Williams; C	Recruit ratings: Scout: Rivals:				
Overall recruit ranking: Scout: 11 Rivals: 26
Note: In many cases, Scout, Rivals, 247Sports, On3, and ESPN may conflict in their listings of height and weight.; In these cases, the average was taken. ESPN grades are on a 100-point scale.; Sources: "Kentucky 2007 Basketball Commitments". Rivals.; "2007 Kentucky Basketball Commits". Scout.; "ESPN". ESPN.; "Scout.com Team Recruiting Rankings". Scout.; "2007 Team Ranking". Rivals.

== 2007–08 schedule and results ==
Date time, TV	Rank^{#}	Opponent^{#}	Result	Record	Site (attendance) city, state
Non-conference regular season
November 6, 2007*; 8:00 pm, ESPNU	No. 23	Central Arkansas	W 67–40	1–0	Rupp Arena (20,335); Lexington, Kentucky
November 7, 2007*; 9:00 pm, ESPNU	No. 23	Gardner-Webb	L 68–84	1–1	Rupp Arena (19,845); Lexington, Kentucky
November 21, 2007*; 7:00 pm, FSN		Liberty	W 80–54	2–1	Rupp Arena (21,298); Lexington, Kentucky
November 24, 2007*; 7:00 pm, FSN		Texas Southern	W 83–35	3–1	Rupp Arena (21,445); Lexington, Kentucky
November 27, 2007*; 7:00 pm, FSN South		Stony Brook	W 62–52	4–1	Rupp Arena (19,269); Lexington, Kentucky
December 1, 2007*; 2:00 pm, ESPN2		No. 1 North Carolina	L 77–86	4–2	Rupp Arena (24,252); Lexington, Kentucky
December 8, 2007*; 3:45 pm, CBS		at No. 15 Indiana	L 51–71	4–3	Assembly Hall (17,410); Bloomington, Indiana
December 15, 2007*; 2:00 pm, ESPN		UAB	L 76–79	4–4	Freedom Hall (14,241); Louisville, Kentucky
December 18, 2007*; 9:00 pm, ESPN		at Houston	L 69–83	4–5	Hofheinz Pavilion (8,517); Houston, Texas
December 22, 2007*; 1:00 pm, FSN		Tennessee Tech	W 69–47	5–5	Rupp Arena (22,371); Lexington, Kentucky
December 29, 2007*; 2:00 pm, ESPN		San Diego	L 72–81	5–6	Rupp Arena (23,756); Lexington, Kentucky
December 31, 2007*; 12:00 pm, FSN		Florida International	W 92–49	6–6	Rupp Arena (19,184); Lexington, Kentucky
January 5, 2008*; 4:00 pm, CBS		Louisville; Battle for the Bluegrass	L 75–89	6–7	Rupp Arena (24,386); Lexington, Kentucky
SEC Regular Season
January 12, 2008; 1:30 pm, CBS		No. 12 Vanderbilt	W 79–73 ^{2OT}	7–7 (1–0)	Rupp Arena (23,965); Lexington, Kentucky
January 15, 2008; 9:00 pm, ESPN		at Mississippi State	L 64–69	7–8 (1–1)	Humphrey Coliseum (9,862); Starkville, Mississippi
January 19, 2008; 9:00 pm, ESPN		at Florida 'ESPN College GameDay'	L 70–81 ^{OT}	7–9 (1–2)	O'Connell Center (12,222); Gainesville, Florida
January 22, 2008; 9:00 pm, ESPN		No. 3 Tennessee	W 72–66	8–9 (2–2)	Rupp Arena (23,443); Lexington, Kentucky
January 26, 2008; 1:00 pm, Raycom		South Carolina	W 78–70	9–9 (3–2)	Rupp Arena (23,996); Lexington, Kentucky
February 2, 2008; 1:00 pm, CBS		at Georgia	W 63–58	10–9 (4–2)	Stegeman Coliseum (10,313); Athens, Georgia
February 6, 2008; 8:00 pm, Raycom		at Auburn	W 66–63	11–9 (5–2)	Beard-Eaves-Memorial Coliseum (5,352); Auburn, AL
February 9, 2008; 12:00 pm, Raycom		Alabama	W 62–52	12–9 (6–2)	Rupp Arena (24,190); Lexington, Kentucky
February 12, 2008; 9:00 pm, ESPN		at No. 19 Vanderbilt	L 52–93	12–10 (6–3)	Memorial Gym (14,325); Nashville, Tennessee
February 16, 2008; 1:00 pm, Raycom		at LSU	W 67–63	13–10 (7–3)	Maravich Center (9,870); Baton Rouge, Louisiana
February 19, 2008; 9:00 pm, ESPN		Georgia	W 61–55	14–10 (8–3)	Rupp Arena (22,271); Lexington, Kentucky
February 23, 2008; 2:00 pm, CBS		Arkansas	W 63–58	15–10 (9–3)	Rupp Arena (24,371); Lexington, Kentucky
February 27, 2008; 8:00 pm, Raycom		Mississippi	W 58–54	16–10 (10–3)	Rupp Arena (23,330); Lexington, Kentucky
March 2, 2008; 12:00 pm, CBS		at No. 1 Tennessee	L 60–63	16–11 (10–4)	Thompson–Boling Arena (21,628); Knoxville, Tennessee
March 5, 2008; 7:00 pm, Raycom		at South Carolina	W 71–63	17–11 (11–4)	Colonial Center (13,324); Columbia, South Carolina
March 9, 2008; 12:00 pm, CBS		Florida; Senior Day	W 75–70	18–11 (12–4)	Rupp Arena (24,256); Lexington, Kentucky
2008 SEC Tournament
March 14, 2008; 12:00, Raycom	(E2)	vs. (E6) Georgia; Quarterfinals	L 56–60 ^{OT}	18–12 (12–4)	Alexander Memorial Coliseum (1,458); Atlanta, Georgia
2008 NCAA Tournament
March 20, 2008; 2:30, CBS	(11 W)	vs. (6 W) No. 25 Marquette; First round	L 66–74	18–13 (12–4)	Honda Center (N/A); Anaheim, California
*Non-conference game. ^{#}Rankings from Coaches' Poll. (#) Tournament seedings in parentheses.

== Class of 2008 commitments/signees ==
College recruiting (2008)
Name	Hometown	School	Height	Weight	Commit date
DeAndre Liggins; G	Chicago, Illinois	Findlay Prep	6 ft 6 in (1.98 m)	202 lb (92 kg)	Jun 27, 2007
DeAndre Liggins; G	Recruit ratings: Scout: Rivals: (89)				
Darius Miller; G/F	Maysville, Kentucky	Mason County	6 ft 7 in (2.01 m)	223 lb (101 kg)	Sep 7, 2007
Darius Miller; G/F	Recruit ratings: Scout: Rivals: (91)				
Kevin Galloway; G/F	Sacramento, California	College of Southern Idaho	6 ft 6 in (1.98 m)	215 lb (98 kg)	Mar 10, 2008
Kevin Galloway; G/F	Recruit ratings: Scout: Rivals: (n/a)				
Josh Harrellson; C	St. Charles, Missouri	Southwestern Illinois Community College	6 ft 10 in (2.08 m)	265 lb (120 kg)	Apr 29, 2008
Josh Harrellson; C	Recruit ratings: Scout: Rivals: (n/a)				
Overall recruit ranking: Scout: 15 Rivals: 21
Note: In many cases, Scout, Rivals, 247Sports, On3, and ESPN may conflict in their listings of height and weight.; In these cases, the average was taken. ESPN grades are on a 100-point scale.; Sources: "Kentucky 2008 Basketball Commitments". Rivals.; "2008 Kentucky Basketball Commits". Scout.; "ESPN". ESPN.; "Scout.com Team Recruiting Rankings". Scout.; "2008 Team Ranking". Rivals.
