= 2007–08 Mississippi State Bulldogs basketball team =

American college basketball season

2007–08 Mississippi State Bulldogs men's basketball

SEC Western Division champions

NCAA tournament, second round
- Conference: Southeastern Conference
- Record: 23–11 (12–4 SEC)
- Head coach: Rick Stansbury (10th season)
- Assistant coaches: Phil Cunningham; Marcus Grant; Robert Kirby
- Home arena: Humphrey Coliseum

2007–08 Southeastern Conference men's basketball standings
	Conf.				Overall
Team	W		L	PCT	W		L	PCT
East
No. 5 Tennessee	14	–	2	.875	31	–	5	.861
Kentucky	12	–	4	.750	18	–	13	.581
No. 19 Vanderbilt	10	–	6	.625	26	–	8	.765
Florida	8	–	8	.500	24	–	12	.667
South Carolina	5	–	11	.313	14	–	18	.438
Georgia †	4	–	12	.250	17	–	17	.500
West
Mississippi State	12	–	4	.750	23	–	11	.676
Arkansas	9	–	7	.563	23	–	12	.657
Ole Miss	7	–	9	.438	24	–	11	.686
LSU	6	–	10	.375	13	–	18	.419
Alabama	5	–	11	.313	17	–	16	.515
Auburn	4	–	12	.250	14	–	16	.467
† 2008 SEC tournament winner As of April 7, 2008; Rankings from AP Poll

The 2007–08 Mississippi State basketball team represented Mississippi State University in the 2007–08 college basketball season. Under head coach Rick Stansbury, the team played their home games at Humphrey Coliseum in Starkville, Mississippi, and was a member of the Southeastern Conference.

== Previous season ==
The 2006–07 Bulldogs finished the season 21–14 (8–8 in SEC play) and reached the NIT Final Four.

== Before the season ==
=== Departures ===
In additions to losing two seniors from the 2006–07, four players (80% of the 2005 recruiting class) transferred to others schools over the offseason.

Name	Number	Pos.	Height	Weight	Year	Hometown	Notes
Reginald Delk	24	Guard	6'4"	175	Sophomore	Jackson, TN	Transferred to Louisville
Richard Delk	1	Guard	6'4"	175	Sophomore	Jackson, TN	Transferred to Troy
Vernon Goodridge	40	Forward	6'9"	225	Sophomore	Brooklyn, NY	Transferred to La Salle
Bernard Rimmer	30	Forward	6'8"	195	Sophomore	Grenada, MS	Transferred to Georgia State
Deitric Slater	22	Guard	6'3"	200	Senior	Waynesboro, MS	Graduated
Piotr Stelmach	41	Forward	6'9"	240	Senior	Kamień Pomorski, Poland	Graduated

=== Recruits ===
College recruiting
Name	Hometown	School	Height	Weight	Commit date
Kodi Augustus; PF	Baton Rouge, LA	Maine Central Institute	6 ft 8 in (2.03 m)	220 lb (100 kg)	Jul 27, 2006
Kodi Augustus; PF	Recruit ratings: Scout: Rivals:				
Elgin Bailey; PF	New Orleans, LA	Belaire HS	6 ft 8 in (2.03 m)	252 lb (114 kg)	Nov 10, 2006
Elgin Bailey; PF	Recruit ratings: Scout: Rivals:				
Riley Benock; PG	Battletown, KY	Meade County HS	6 ft 4 in (1.93 m)	175 lb (79 kg)	Apr 17, 2007
Riley Benock; PG	Recruit ratings: Scout: Rivals:				
Ravern Johnson; SF	Lyon, MS	Coahoma County HS	6 ft 7 in (2.01 m)	175 lb (79 kg)	Apr 24, 2006
Ravern Johnson; SF	Recruit ratings: Scout: Rivals:				
Overall recruit ranking:
Note: In many cases, Scout, Rivals, 247Sports, On3, and ESPN may conflict in their listings of height and weight.; In these cases, the average was taken. ESPN grades are on a 100-point scale.; Sources: "Mississippi State 2007 Basketball Commitments". Rivals.; "2007 Mississippi State Basketball Commits". Scout.; "ESPN". ESPN.; "Scout.com Team Recruiting Rankings". Scout.; "2007 Team Ranking". Rivals.

== Roster ==
2007–08 Mississippi State Bulldogs men's basketball team
Players
Coaches

Pos.	#	Name	Height	Weight	Year	Previous school	Hometown
F	2	Ravern Johnson	6 ft 7 in (2.01 m)	175 lb (79 kg)	Fr	Coahoma County HS	Lyon, MS
G	3	Billy Begley (W)	6 ft 1 in (1.85 m)	190 lb (86 kg)	Sr	Webster County HS	Henderson, KY
G	10	Joseph Iupe (W)	6 ft 1 in (1.85 m)	160 lb (73 kg)	So	Madison Central HS	Madison, MS
G	11	Ben Hansbrough	6 ft 3 in (1.91 m)	205 lb (93 kg)	So	Poplar Bluff HS	Poplar Bluff, MO
G	14	Rod Bryant (W)	6 ft 1 in (1.85 m)	165 lb (75 kg)	Fr	G. W. Carver HS	Birmingham, AL
G	15	Riley Benock	6 ft 4 in (1.93 m)	180 lb (82 kg)	Fr	Meade County HS	Battletown, KY
F	21	Brian Johnson	6 ft 9 in (2.06 m)	245 lb (111 kg)	Jr	Bishop O'Connell HS	Laurinburg, NC
G	22	Barry Stewart	6 ft 2 in (1.88 m)	170 lb (77 kg)	So	Shelbyville Central HS	Shelbyville, TN
F	23	Charles Rhodes	6 ft 8 in (2.03 m)	245 lb (111 kg)	Sr	Lanier HS	Jackson, MS
F	24	Kodi Augustus	6 ft 8 in (2.03 m)	220 lb (100 kg)	Fr	Maine Central Institute	Baton Rouge, LA
G	25	Phil Turner	6 ft 3 in (1.91 m)	170 lb (77 kg)	RS Fr	Grenada HS	Grenada, MS
F	32	Jarvis Varnado	6 ft 9 in (2.06 m)	210 lb (95 kg)	So	Haywood HS	Brownsville, TN
G	33	Brandon Bolen (W)	6 ft 3 in (1.91 m)	195 lb (88 kg)	Fr	Madison-Ridgeland Academy	Madison, MS
G	44	Jamont Gordon	6 ft 4 in (1.93 m)	230 lb (104 kg)	Jr	Oak Hill Academy	Nashville, TN
F	45	Elgin Bailey	6 ft 8 in (2.03 m)	265 lb (120 kg)	Fr	Belaire HS	New Orleans, LA

Head coach

- Rick Stansbury (Campbellsville)

Assistant coach(es)

- Phil Cunningham (Campbellsville)
- Marcus Grant (Mississippi State)
- Robert Kirby (UTPA)

Legend

- (C) Team captain
- (S) Suspended
- (I) Ineligible
- (W) Walk-on
- Injured
- Current redshirt

Roster
