= 2007–08 Vanderbilt Commodores men's basketball team =

American college basketball season

2007–08 Vanderbilt Commodores men's basketball

NCAA tournament first round
- Conference: Southeastern Conference

Ranking
- Coaches: No. 25
- AP: No. 18
- Record: 26–8 (10–6, 3rd SEC East)
- Head coach: Kevin Stallings
- Assistant coaches: Dan Muller; Tom Richardson; King Rice
- Home arena: Memorial Gymnasium

2007–08 Southeastern Conference men's basketball standings
	Conf.				Overall
Team	W		L	PCT	W		L	PCT
East
No. 5 Tennessee	14	–	2	.875	31	–	5	.861
Kentucky	12	–	4	.750	18	–	13	.581
No. 19 Vanderbilt	10	–	6	.625	26	–	8	.765
Florida	8	–	8	.500	24	–	12	.667
South Carolina	5	–	11	.313	14	–	18	.438
Georgia †	4	–	12	.250	17	–	17	.500
West
Mississippi State	12	–	4	.750	23	–	11	.676
Arkansas	9	–	7	.563	23	–	12	.657
Ole Miss	7	–	9	.438	24	–	11	.686
LSU	6	–	10	.375	13	–	18	.419
Alabama	5	–	11	.313	17	–	16	.515
Auburn	4	–	12	.250	14	–	16	.467
† 2008 SEC tournament winner As of April 7, 2008; Rankings from AP Poll

The 2007–08 Vanderbilt Commodores men's basketball team represented Vanderbilt University in the 2007–08 college basketball season. The team was led by head coach Kevin Stallings and played home games at Memorial Gymnasium.

The 2007–08 team finished the season 26–8, and ranked 25th in both the AP Poll and the ESPN/USA Today (Coaches) poll. Their 16–0 start was the best in school history. The team finished in 3rd place in the SEC Eastern Division with a 10–6 conference record.

During Selection Sunday, Vanderbilt received a #4 seed in the Midwest Region of the 2008 NCAA Division I men's basketball tournament. They faced #13 seed Siena in the first round on March 21, 2008. The Commodores were upset at a final score of 83–62, becoming the second #4 seed upset after UConn's overtime loss to San Diego.

== Preseason outlook ==
Entering the season, Vanderbilt was picked by the media attending the SEC's media days in October to finish 4th in the SEC East, behind Tennessee, Kentucky and two-time defending national champion Florida.

Vanderbilt lost two starters from last year's team—2007 SEC-player of the year Derrick Byars (19.1 ppg) and shooting guard, Dan Cage (11.2 ppg) – and return three starters—swingman Shan Foster, point guard Alex Gordon and power forward Ross Neltner.

Shan Foster was the Commodores' second leading scorer last season (15.6 ppg) and is the third leading returning scorer in the SEC. Foster was selected by the SEC media to the pre-season all-SEC second team. Alex Gordon had only 51 turnovers last season, tops among starting SEC point guards, and his 2.22-to-1 assist-to-turnover ratio was fourth best in the SEC. Neltner provided a versatile presence inside, averaging 5.7 rebounds per game, dishing out 74 assists and hitting 11-of-28 attempts from three-point range.

Sophomores Jermaine Beal and George Drake and freshman Keegan Bell are expected to compete for the shooting guard spot vacated by Cage. The Commodores appear set at center, where senior Alan Metcalfe and freshman Andrew (A.J.) Ogilvy will share time. Metcalfe missed part of last season with a foot injury, while Ogilvy comes highly touted after spending four years at the Australian Institute of Sport. Other newcomers expected to vie for playing time are guard Keegan Bell and forwards Andre Walker and Darshawn McClellan.

== Game recaps ==
=== Regular season ===
Games 1–4. Vanderbilt (4–0) began its season with an 81–67 home win over Austin Peay (0–1), then won at Toledo (1–1) 77–70. The Commodores beat Valparaiso 87–78 and Utah State 77–56 in the South Padre Island Shootout.

Game 5. Vanderbilt (5–0) defeated Bradley (4–2) 95–86 in the championship game of the South Padre Island Shootout on November 24, 2007. A.J. Oglivy scored 23 points, and Shan Foster 22, to lead the Commodores. After the Commodores raced to an 18-point halftime lead (53–35), Bradley senior point guard Daniel Ruffin led the Braves back to within 85–84 late in the game. But Alex Gordon hit a 10-foot jump shot and sank four free throws in the final 30 seconds as the Commodores pulled away. Ruffin—the half-brother of former Indiana All-American A.J. Guyton – finished with 23 points and 6 assists. Bradley (22–13 last season, MVC: 10–8, 4th) was picked to finish second in the Missouri Valley Conference this season by the league's coaches, media and sports information directors, behind unanimous first-place selection Southern Illinois.

Game 6. Vanderbilt (6–0) defeated South Alabama (4–3) 91–88 in double overtime on November 29, 2007. Shan Foster scored 26 points, as the Commodores rallied from a 59–51 deficit with 12:02 left. Andrew Oglivy had 19 points and 8 rebounds, while Ross Neltner added 15. Senior guard Demetric Bennett—a preseason All-Sun Belt first team selection—led the Jaguars with 25 points and reserve junior guard Domonic Tilford had 20. South Alabama was picked to finish second in the East Division of the Sun Belt Conference preseason media poll behind Western Kentucky.

Game 7. Vanderbilt (7–0) beat Georgia Tech (3–4) 92–79 on December 1, 2007. The Yellow Jackets led briefly 2–0, but Shan Foster hit a 3 to give the Commodores a lead they would not relinquish. Vanderbilt led by as many as 28 points in the second half before emptying its bench. Foster finished with 17 points, while Andrew Oglivy had 16 and Alan Metcalfe 15. Anthony Morrow, Tech's leading scorer, had only 2 points with 5 minutes to go, when Vandy led 86–58. He came into the game averaging 19.0 ppg. Georgia Tech was picked to finish seventh in the ACC by the league's media.

Game 8. No. 23 Vanderbilt (8–0) (AP, No. 25 Coaches poll) remained perfect with a tight 83–80 win over Wake Forest (5–2) on December 5, 2007. Shan Foster scored 26 points to go with 7 rebounds, and A.J. Oglivy scored 23, for the Commodores, who are 8–0 for only the fifth time ever. The game was close throughout, and neither team led by more than six points in the second half. Harvey Hale and James Johnson led Wake with 18 points apiece. The Demon Deacons (2006: 15–16, 5–11 (10th)) were picked to finish 11th by the ACC's media.

Game 9. No. 23 Vanderbilt (9–0) (AP, No. 25 Coaches poll) used a fast start to defeat Lipscomb (4–6) 90–67 on December 8, 2007. A.J. Oglivy scored a career-high 26 points, and Shan Foster had 21 for the Commodores, who raced out to an 18–4 lead and never led by less than 8 points after that.

Game 10. No. 20 Vanderbilt (10–0) (AP, No. 21 Coaches poll) rallied from an 18-point deficit early in the second half to beat DePaul (2–4) 91–85 in overtime in Chicago on December 12, 2007. With Shan Foster and A.J. Oglivy both struggling, the Commodores trailed 58–40 after Dar Tucker scored on an alley-opp dunk with 15:15 to go. Vanderbilt seemed to revive, finally tying the score at 79–79 with 22 seconds left. Foster and Oglivy, the SEC's top two leading scorers, each finished with 19 points.

Game 11. No. 17 Vanderbilt (11–0) (AP and Coaches polls) had to overcome a large second half deficit for the second game in a row, downing Tennessee State (3–7) 83–74 on December 22, 2007. Playing after a 10-day break for exams, the Commodores trailed 56–47 with 11:53 to go. However, they stormed back with an 18–4 run to lead 65–60 with 7:33 left. Shan Foster had 22 points and Alex Gordon 16 for Vanderbilt, while Gerald Robinson led all scorers with 24 for the Tigers.

Game 12. No. 15 Vanderbilt (12–0) (AP and Coaches polls) beat UT Martin (5–8) 92–85 on December 29, 2007. The Commodores jumped out to a 13-point lead in the first half. However, Vandy's starters let UTM go on a 10–0 to start the 2nd half, even losing the lead at one point. Shan Foster hit a 3-pointer with the score tied at 83, and the Dores never trailed after that. A.J. Ogilvy led Vanderbilt with 21 points and just missed a double-double with 9 rebounds. UT-Martin's Lester Hudson (3rd in NCAA in ppg) led all scorers with 36 points.

Game 13. No. 15 Vanderbilt (13–0) (AP and Coaches polls) set a season high for points scored during a 97–73 rout of Iona (5–9) on December 29, 2007. The Commodores achieved their best ever start, bettering a 12–0 start in 2003–04. After trading baskets for much of the first half, the Commodores built a 5-point lead at halftime. Unlike their previous game, the Commodores went on a 26–5 run to start the second half, putting the game out of reach and allowing the walk-on players to get some playing time. Vanderbilt continued to display a lax defense, but more than made up for it by shooting 56% from the floor and 55% from beyond the arc. Vanderbilt had four players in double figures, led by A.J. Ogilvy (who again just missed a double-double with 20 points and 9 rebounds) and Shan Foster (20 points).

Game 14. No. 15 Vanderbilt (14–0) (AP and Coaches polls) put together a solid effort in beating Rice (3–9) 76–58 on January 3, 2008. The Commodores used a stifling defense to take control of the game from the onset, forcing a season-high 24 turnovers. Shan Foster netted 24 points, while A.J. Ogilvy added 14 points and 9 rebounds and Alex Gordon had 11 points.

Game 15. No. 15 Vanderbilt (15–0) (AP and Coaches polls) overcame deficits of 9 and 14 points to beat Massachusetts (11–3) 97–88 on January 5, 2008, tying a season high for points scored. Vandy was led by senior guard Shan Foster, who scored 32 points and hit 8 3-pointers, and freshman center A.J. Ogilvy, who notched a double-double with 25 points and 11 rebounds. Sophomore point guard Jermaine Beal added a career-high 15 points for the Commodores. Ricky Harris led the Minutemen with 25 points.

Game 16. No. 13 Vanderbilt (16–0, 1–0) (AP, No. 12 Coaches polls) won its SEC opener by beating South Carolina (8–7, 0–1) by a score of 80–73 on January 9, 2008. Vanderbilt was led by freshman sensation A.J. Ogilvy with 25 points, while seniors Alex Gordon and Shan Foster had 13 points apiece. The Gamecocks were led by Devan Downey, who had 22 points. After hitting a 3-pointer in the game, Shan Foster became the Commodores' all-time leading 3-point shooter.

Game 17. No. 13 Vanderbilt (16–1, 1–1) (AP, No. 12 Coaches poll) lost its first game of the season, 79–73 in double-overtime to Kentucky (7–7, 1–0) at Rupp Arena. The loss snapped the Commodores' 4-game winning streak against the Wildcats. Vanderbilt entered the game as one of five remaining unbeaten teams in men's Division I basketball. Kentucky controlled most of the game, taking a 16-point lead five minutes into the second half. The Commodores, who never led in regulation, tied the game on a three-pointer by Shan Foster with 14 seconds left to force overtime. The teams traded leads in the first overtime, but Vandy needed an A.J. Ogilvy-putback with 1.8 seconds left to force a second overtime. The Wildcats outscored Vanderbilt 7–1 in the second overtime to win the game. Patrick Patterson led the Wildcats with 23 points and 12 rebounds, while Ramel Bradley added 20 points and Joe Crawford 17. The Commodores were led by Foster's 20 points and Ogilvy's 16 points and 5 rebounds.

Game 18. No. 16 Vanderbilt (16–2, 1–2) (AP, No. 14 Coaches poll) lost 80–60 to No. 6 Tennessee (15–1, 3–0) (AP, No. 7 Coaches poll) in Knoxville, TN, its second loss in a row. The Vols held the Commodores well below their season scoring average (86.0 ppg) and limited them to 3 three-pointers. Vanderbilt stayed close for about 11 minutes, but a 16–3 run gave Tennessee a 33–18 lead with 3:59 left in the first half. After halftime, the Vols used a 17–6 run to take a 59–38 lead, but the Commodores responded with a 15–2 run to make it 61–53 with 7:48 to go. They would get no closer. Wayne Chism led the Vols with 18 points and 18 rebounds, while Shan Foster led the Commodores with 14 points and 6 rebounds.

Game 19. No. 16 Vanderbilt (17–2, 2–2) (AP, No. 14 Coaches poll) defeated LSU (7–11, 0–4) 92–76, ending a two-game losing skid.

Game 20. After an eight-day layoff, No. 14 Vanderbilt (17–3, 2–3) (AP, No. 13 Coaches poll) lost 86–64 to Florida (18–3, 5–1) in Gainesville. The Gators went on a 23–0 run early in the first half to put the game out of reach early.

Game 21. No. 19 Vanderbilt (17–4, 2–4) (AP, No. 18 Coaches poll) lost 74–58 to No. 24 Ole Miss (16–3, 3–4) (AP, No. 22 Coaches poll) in Oxford, Mississippi, its fourth consecutive road loss in SEC play.

Game 22. After losing four of their last five games, No. 19 Vanderbilt (18–4, 3–4) (AP, No. 18 Coaches poll) defeated Auburn (12–8, 2–5) 78–71.

Game 23. No. 23 Vanderbilt (19–4, 4–4) (AP, No. 20 Coaches poll) picked up an important road win in SEC play, defeating Georgia (11–9, 2–5) in Athens by a score of 67–59.

Game 24. No. 23 Vanderbilt (20–4, 5–4) (AP, No. 20 Coaches poll) traveled to Columbia, South Carolina to take on South Carolina (11–10, 3–4) on Saturday, February 9, 2008. The Commodores defeated the Gamecocks for the second time this season with a score of 66–65 as sophomore Jermaine Beal hit a short fadeaway jumper with 0.6 seconds left.

Game 25. No. 24 Vanderbilt (21–4, 6–4) (AP, No. 19 Coaches poll) were at home in Memorial Gymnasium to face the Kentucky Wildcats (12–10, 6–3). Kentucky suffered their worst defeat in 21 years, and their worst SEC defeat ever, as they fell to the Commodores at a final score of 93–52. Shan Foster scored 20 points and A. J. Ogilvy added another 19 for Vanderbilt.

Game 26. No. 24 Vanderbilt (22–4, 7–4) (AP, No. 19 Coaches poll) hosted the Florida Gators (19–7, 6–5), who defeated the Commodores in Gainesville earlier in the season. The Commodores won 61–58 as Alex Gordon made four free throws in the final 24 seconds; Florida freshman Nick Calethas also committed a costly backcourt violation in the closing seconds. Alex Gordon and A.J. Ogilvy each scored 12 points and Shan Foster added 19 points and 6 rebounds.

Game 27. No. 20 Vanderbilt (23–4, 8–4) (AP, No. 16 Coaches poll), for the third straight game, were at home at Memorial Gymnasium as they faced the Georgia Bulldogs (12–13, 3–9), who they had defeated just a few weeks earlier in Athens. The Bulldogs led 38–37 at halftime, but Vanderbilt stormed out of the gates in the second half as they opened on a 29–11 run. The Commodores won the game at a final score of 86–74 with 29 points from Shan Foster and 23 points from Alex Gordon.

Game 28. No. 18 Vanderbilt (24–4, 9–4) (AP, No. 14 Coaches poll) faced their toughest test of the season as they hosted in-state rivals No. 1 Tennessee Volunteers (25–3, 11–2) (AP and coaches polls). Shan Foster contributed 32 points and Jermaine Beal scored 17. With 1.8 seconds left, Tennessee threw a shot downcourt to force overtime but it was not close, and the Commodores defeated their rivals at a final score of 72–69.

Game 29. No. 18 Vanderbilt (24–5, 9–5) (AP, No. 14 Coaches poll) traveled to Fayetteville, AR to take on the Arkansas Razorbacks (19–9, 8–6). Although Shan Foster scored 22 points, becoming Vanderbilt's all-time leading scorer in the process, the Commodores fell to the Razorbacks 78–73. Down by 1 point with under 10 seconds to play and no timeouts left, Vanderbilt senior Ross Neltner called for a timeout, receiving a technical foul that sealed the win for the Razorbacks.

Game 30. No. 16 Vanderbilt (25–5, 10–5) (AP and coaches' polls) hosted Mississippi State (No. 25 coaches' poll) for their final home game of the season. On senior night, Shan Foster hit his final nine three-pointers and amassed a career high of 42 points, as Vanderbilt defeated the Bulldogs 86–85 in overtime. With the victory, Vanderbilt finished the season undefeated at home in Memorial Gym.

Game 31. No. 16 Vanderbilt (25–6, 10–6) (AP and coaches' polls) were at Coleman Coliseum to face Alabama in the final game of the season for both sides. Vanderbilt shot .280 percent from behind the arc. Though Shan Foster scored 21 points and A.J. Ogily added another 17, the Commodores fell to the Tide 78–73 in overtime. Alabama guard Mykal Riley scored 26 points, including the first 13 points for the Tide in overtime.

=== SEC tournament ===
Game 32. No. 18 Vanderbilt (26–6) (AP, No. 17 coaches' poll) traveled to Atlanta, GA for the SEC tournament to face Auburn (14–16) in a first-round matchup. Behind a career-high 27 points from A.J. Ogilvy and 26 points from Shan Foster, Vanderbilt beat the Tigers 93–82 to advance to the quarterfinals of the tournament.

Game 33. No. 18 Vanderbilt (26–7) (AP, No. 17 coaches' poll) faced off against Arkansas in an SEC tournament quarterfinal matchup. The Razorbacks extended their win streak to five games over the Commodores by dominating the rebounds and points in the paint. Vanderbilt senior Alex Gordon led all scorers with 22 points in the loss.

=== NCAA tournament ===
Game 34. No. 18 Vanderbilt (26–8) (AP, No. 17 coaches' poll) were selected as a #4 seed in the Midwest Region of the 2008 NCAA tournament to face #13 seed Siena Saints. In his final collegiate game, Shan Foster scored just 13 points and was 1-for-5 from three-point range. The Commodores struggled to find consistent offense, going 4-for-20 from beyond the arc. Siena guard Kenny Hasbrouck scored 30 points to lead the Saints to an 83–62 upset of the #4 seeded Commodores.

== Roster and individual statistics ==
#	Name	Pos.	Height	Weight	Year	Hometown	High school	GP	Min	Ppg	Rpg	Apg
0	Jermaine Beal	G	6–3	210	Sophomore	DeSoto, TX	DeSoto	34	27.5	7.6	2.1	4.6
1	Festus Ezeli^{1}	C	6–11	245	Freshman	Benin City, Nigeria	Igbinedion Education Center	–	–	–	–	–
2	Charles Hinkle^{1}	G/F	6–6	200	Freshman	Los Alamitos, CA	Hebron Academy (Maine)/Los Alamitos	–	–	–	–	–
3	Alex Gordon	G	6–0	170	Senior	Pensacola, FL	Pensacola	34	29.8	10.8	2.4	3.1
4	Andrew (A.J.) Ogilvy	C	6–10	250	Freshman	Sydney, Australia	Australian Institute of Sport, Canberra	34	26.4	17.0	6.7	1.2
11	Alan Metcalfe	F	6–9	265	Senior	St. Helens, England	Notre Dame Academy (Va.)	34	11.6	5.3	2.3	0.2
13	Keegan Bell	G	6–1	180	Freshman	Hazel Green, AL	Hazel Green	34	13.5	2.7	1.2	2.8
15	Elliott Cole^{2}	G	5–11	175	Freshman	Memphis, TN	Memphis University School	5	0.8	0.0	0.6	0.0
21	Darshawn McClellan	F	6–7	220	Freshman	Fresno, CA	Edison (Fresno)	34	14.1	2.7	3.0	0.7
22	Jamie Graham^{2}	G	5–11	180	Freshman	Nashville, TN	Whites Creek	15	4.3	1.5	0.7	0.3
24	Andre Walker	F	6–7	214	Freshman	Flossmoor, IL	Brewster Academy (N.H.)/Homewood-Flossmoor	34	11.2	2.4	2.0	1.1
32	Shan Foster	G-F	6–5	205	Senior	Kenner, LA	Alfred Bonnabel	34	33.7	20.3	4.9	1.6
34	George Drake	G-F	6–4	210	Sophomore	Calera, AL	Calera	33	8.0	2.1	1.2	0.4
41	Ross Neltner	F	6–9	240	Senior	Fort Thomas, KY	Highlands	34	27.0	8.3	5.6	2.0
50	Joe Duffy^{2}	F	6–8	225	Freshman	Charlotte, N.C.	Phillips Exeter Academy (N.H.)/Charlotte Catholic	11	1.7	0.9	0.2	0.0

^{1} Reshirted this season. ^{2} Walk-on.

Stats through 33 games. Source: ESPN.com

== 2007–08 schedule and results ==
Date time, TV	Rank^{#}	Opponent^{#}	Result	Record	Site (attendance) city, state
Exhibition
November 5*; 8:00 pm		Tusculum	W 80–79		Memorial Gymnasium; Nashville, TN
Regular season
November 10*; 7:00 pm, CSS		Austin Peay	W 81–67	1–0	Memorial Gymnasium (13,196); Nashville, TN
November 13*; 6:00 pm		at Toledo	W 77–70	2–0	Savage Hall (4,061); Toledo, OH
November 20*; 7:00 pm		Valparaiso; South Padre Island Shoot-out	W 87–78	3–0	Memorial Gymnasium (11,171); Nashville, TN
November 23*; 9:00 pm, CSTV		vs. Utah State; South Padre Island Shoot-out	W 77–56	4–0	South Padre Island Convention Centre (850); South Padre Island, TX
November 24*; 7:30 pm		vs. Bradley; South Padre Island Shoot-out	W 95–86	5–0	South Padre Island Convention Centre (750); South Padre Island, TX
November 29*; 7:00 pm, CSS		South Alabama	W 91–88 ^{2OT}	6–0	Memorial Gymnasium (12,065); Nashville, TN
December 1*; 12:00 pm, FSN		Georgia Tech	W 92–79	7–0	Memorial Gymnasium (13,322); Nashville, TN
December 5*; 7:00 pm, FSN	No. 23	Wake Forest	W 83–80	8–0	Memorial Gymnasium (13,658); Nashville, TN
December 8*; 8:00 pm, CSS	No. 23	Lipscomb	W 90–67	9–0	Memorial Gymnasium (13,788); Nashville, TN
December 12*; 7:00 pm, ESPNC	No. 20	at DePaul	W 91–85 ^{OT}	10–0	Allstate Arena (8,015); Rosemont, IL
December 22*; 8:00 pm, CSS	No. 17	Tennessee State	W 83–74	11–0	Memorial Gymnasium (13,808); Nashville, TN
December 29*; 12:00 pm	No. 15	UT-Martin	W 92–85	12–0	Memorial Gymnasium (12,559); Nashville, TN
December 31*; 12:00 pm	No. 15	Iona	W 97–73	13–0	Memorial Gymnasium (11,949); Nashville, TN
January 3*; 7:00 pm	No. 15	Rice	W 76–58	14–0	Memorial Gymnasium (11,966); Nashville, TN
January 5*; 3:00 pm, CSS	No. 15	Massachusetts	W 97–88	15–0	Memorial Gymnasium (13,750); Nashville, TN
January 9; 7:00 pm	No. 13	South Carolina	W 80–73	16–0 (1–0)	Memorial Gymnasium (14,325); Nashville, TN
January 12; 12:30 pm, CBS	No. 13	at Kentucky	L 73–79 ^{2OT}	16–1 (1–1)	Rupp Arena (23,965); Lexington, KY
January 17; 6:00 pm, ESPN	No. 16	at No. 6 Tennessee	L 60–80	16–2 (1–2)	Thompson–Boling Arena (20,799); Knoxville, TN
January 19; 12:00 pm, LFS	No. 16	LSU	W 92–76	17–2 (2–2)	Memorial Gymnasium (13,797); Nashville, TN
January 27; 12:00 pm, LFS	No. 14	at Florida	L 64–86	17–3 (2–3)	O'Connell Center (12,449); Gainesville, FL
January 30; 7:00 pm	No. 19	at No. 24 Mississippi	L 58–74	17–4 (2–4)	Tad Smith Coliseum (8,886); Oxford, MS
February 2; 4:00 pm, FSN	No. 19	Auburn	W 78–71	18–4 (3–4)	Memorial Gymnasium (13,990); Nashville, TN
February 6; 6:30 pm	No. 23	at Georgia	W 67–59	19–4 (4–4)	Stegeman Coliseum (6,788); Athens, GA
February 9; 4:00 pm, FSN	No. 23	at South Carolina	W 66–65	20–4 (5–4)	Colonial Center (13,193); Columbia, SC
February 12; 8:00 pm, ESPN	No. 24	Kentucky; Super Tuesday	W 93–52	21–4 (6–4)	Memorial Gymnasium (14,325); Nashville, TN
February 16; 2:00 pm, LFS	No. 24	Florida	W 61–58	22–4 (7–4)	Memorial Gymnasium (14,325); Nashville, TN
February 23; 3:00 pm, LFS	No. 20	Georgia	W 86–74	23–4 (8–4)	Memorial Gymnasium (14,310); Nashville, TN
February 26; 8:00 pm, ESPN	No. 18	No. 1 Tennessee; Super Tuesday	W 72–69	24–4 (9–4)	Memorial Gymnasium (14,325); Nashville, TN
March 1; 3:00 pm, LFS	No. 18	at Arkansas	L 73–78	24–5 (9–5)	Bud Walton Arena (18,366); Fayetteville, AR
March 5; 7:00 pm	No. 16	Mississippi State	W 86–85 ^{OT}	25–5 (10–5)	Memorial Gymnasium (14,316); Nashville, TN
March 8; 1:00 pm, LFS	No. 16	at Alabama	L 73–78 ^{OT}	25–6 (10–6)	Coleman Coliseum (11,462); Tuscaloosa, AL
SEC tournament
March 13; 2:15 pm, LFS	No. 18	vs. Auburn	W 93–82	26–6	Georgia Dome (12,659); Atlanta, GA
March 14; 2:15 pm, LFS	No. 18	vs. Arkansas	L 75–81	26–7	Georgia Dome (18,020); Atlanta, GA
NCAA tournament
March 21*; 6:20 pm, CBS	No. 18 (4)	vs. No. (13) Siena; First Round	L 62–83	26–8	St. Pete Times Forum (15,328); Tampa, FL
*Non-conference game. ^{#}Rankings from AP Poll. (#) Tournament seedings in parentheses. All times are in Central Time.
