= 2007–08 Florida Gators men's basketball team =

American college basketball season

2007–08 Florida Gators men's basketball

National Invitation Tournament, Semifinals
- Conference: Southeastern Conference
- East
- Record: 24–12 (8–8 SEC)
- Head coach: Billy Donovan
- Assistant coach: Larry Shyatt; Lewis Preston; Rob Lanier
- Home arena: O'Connell Center

2007–08 Southeastern Conference men's basketball standings
	Conf.				Overall
Team	W		L	PCT	W		L	PCT
East
No. 5 Tennessee	14	–	2	.875	31	–	5	.861
Kentucky	12	–	4	.750	18	–	13	.581
No. 19 Vanderbilt	10	–	6	.625	26	–	8	.765
Florida	8	–	8	.500	24	–	12	.667
South Carolina	5	–	11	.313	14	–	18	.438
Georgia †	4	–	12	.250	17	–	17	.500
West
Mississippi State	12	–	4	.750	23	–	11	.676
Arkansas	9	–	7	.563	23	–	12	.657
Ole Miss	7	–	9	.438	24	–	11	.686
LSU	6	–	10	.375	13	–	18	.419
Alabama	5	–	11	.313	17	–	16	.515
Auburn	4	–	12	.250	14	–	16	.467
† 2008 SEC tournament winner As of April 7, 2008; Rankings from AP Poll

The 2007–08 Florida Gators men's basketball team represented the University of Florida in the sport of basketball during the 2007–08 college basketball season. The Gators competed in Division I of the National Collegiate Athletic Association (NCAA) and the Eastern Division of the Southeastern Conference (SEC). They were led by head coach Billy Donovan, and played their home games in the O'Connell Center on the university's Gainesville, Florida campus.

The Gators were looking to rebuild after their 2006–07 season, when they won their second consecutive NCAA national championship. However, none of the starters returned from their 2006–07 season.

== Class of 2007 ==
College recruiting
Name	Hometown	School	Height	Weight	Commit date
Adam Allen; SG	Milton, Florida	Milton HS	6 ft 5 in (1.96 m)	185 lb (84 kg)	Jun 5, 2006
Adam Allen; SG	Recruit ratings: Scout: Rivals: (78)				
Nick Calathes; PG	Winter Park, Florida	Lake Howell HS	6 ft 5 in (1.96 m)	175 lb (79 kg)	Apr 28, 2005
Nick Calathes; PG	Recruit ratings: Scout: Rivals: (97)				
Jai Lucas; PG	Bellaire, Texas	Bellaire HS	5 ft 10 in (1.78 m)	145 lb (66 kg)	May 14, 2007
Jai Lucas; PG	Recruit ratings: Scout: Rivals: (97)				
Chandler Parsons; SF	Winter Park, Florida	Lake Howell HS	6 ft 8 in (2.03 m)	180 lb (82 kg)	Aug 26, 2006
Chandler Parsons; SF	Recruit ratings: Scout: Rivals: (96)				
Alex Tyus; PF	Cincinnati, Ohio	Harmony Christian HS	6 ft 8 in (2.03 m)	200 lb (91 kg)	Jul 11, 2006
Alex Tyus; PF	Recruit ratings: Scout: Rivals: (91)				
Overall Recruiting Rankings: Scout – 3 Rivals – 1 ESPN –

== Roster ==
Name	Number	Position	Height	Weight	Class	Hometown
Adam Allen	14	F	6–8	206	Freshman	Milton, Florida
Nick Calathes	33	G/F	6–6	185	Freshman	Winter Park, Florida
Hudson Fricke	40	G	6–1	185	Freshman	Greenville, South Carolina
Walter Hodge	15	G	6–0	170	Junior	Guaynabo, Puerto Rico
Jai Lucas	5	G	5–11	150	Freshman	Houston, Texas
Jonathan Mitchell	0	F	6–7	243	Sophomore	Mt. Vernon, New York
Chandler Parsons	25	F	6–9	200	Freshman	Winter Park, Florida
Shane Payne	4	G/F	6–5	180	Freshman	Weston, Florida
Marreese Speights	34	F/C	6–10	250	Sophomore	St. Petersburg, Florida
Alex Tyus	23	F	6–8	203	Freshman	St. Louis, Missouri
Michael Weisenberg	22	F	6–7	190	Junior	Long Beach, New York
Dan Werner	21	F	6–7	235	Sophomore	Middletown, New Jersey

=== Coaches ===
Name	Type	College	Graduating year
Billy Donovan	Head coach	Providence College	1987
Larry Shyatt	Associate head coach	College of Wooster	1973
Lewis Preston	Assistant coach	Virginia Military Institute	1993
Rob Lanier	Assistant coach	St. Bonaventure University	1990
Darren Hertz	Assistant to the head coach	University of Florida	1997
Adam Beaupre	Video coordinator	University of Florida	1999
Matt Herring	Strength & Conditioning Coordinator	University of Texas Southwestern	1994
Dave Werner	Athletic trainer	Eastern Kentucky University	
Tom Williams	Academic Counselor		

== 2007–2008 schedule and results ==
Date time, TV	Rank^{#}	Opponent^{#}	Result	Record	Site city, state
Exhibition
November 1, 2007*; 8:00 pm		Flagler	W 97–51		O'Connell Center; Gainesville, FL
November 5, 2007*; 7:00 pm		Lynn	W 101–65		O'Connell Center; Gainesville, FL
Regular season (Non-conference play)
November 9, 2007*; 8:00 pm, FSN		North Dakota State	W 75–65	1–0	O'Connell Center; Gainesville, FL
November 11, 2007*; 3:00 pm, SUN		Tennessee Tech	W 93–65	2–0	O'Connell Center; Gainesville, FL
November 14, 2007*; 7:00 pm, FSN		North Carolina Central	W 105–51	3–0	O'Connell Center; Gainesville, FL
November 17, 2007*; 7:00 pm, FSN		Rutgers	W 88–63	4–0	O'Connell Center; Gainesville, FL
November 20, 2007*; 8:00 pm, SUN	No. 24	North Florida	W 102–51	5–0	O'Connell Center; Gainesville, FL
November 23, 2007*; 8:00 pm, FSN	No. 24	Florida State	L 51–65	5–1	O'Connell Center; Gainesville, FL
November 27, 2007*; 7:00 pm, FSN		Stetson	W 71–48	6–1	O'Connell Center; Gainesville, FL
November 30, 2007*; 7:30 pm, FSN		vs. Vermont	W 86–61	7–1	St. Pete Times Forum; St. Petersburg, FL
December 3, 2007*; 7:00 pm, FSN		Jacksonville	W 88–72	8–1	O'Connell Center; Gainesville, FL
December 5, 2007*; 7:00 pm, SUN		Florida A&M	W 91–52	9–1	O'Connell Center; Gainesville, FL
December 15, 2007*; 3:00 pm, SUN		vs. Georgia Southern	W 52–49	10–1	Veterans Memorial Arena; Jacksonville, FL
December 19, 2007*; 7:00 pm, FSN		Charleston Southern	W 89–64	11–1	O'Connell Center; Gainesville, FL
December 22, 2007*; 4:00 pm, CBS		at Ohio State	L 49–62	11–2	Jerome Schottenstein Center; Columbus, OH
December 29, 2007*; 6:30 pm, FSN		vs. Temple; Orange Bowl Basketball Classic	W 86–69	12–2	BankAtlantic Center; Sunrise, FL
January 2, 2008*; 8:00 pm, FSN		High Point	W 88–70	13–2	O'Connell Center; Gainesville, FL
Regular season (SEC conference play)
January 8, 2008; 9:00 pm, ESPN		at Alabama	W 90–83	14–2 (1–0)	Coleman Coliseum; Tuscaloosa, AL
January 12, 2008; 12:00 pm, Raycom		Auburn	W 72–56	15–2 (2–0)	O'Connell Center; Gainesville, FL
January 16, 2008; 8:00 pm, Raycom		at No. 15 Ole Miss	L 87–89	15–3 (2–1)	Tad Smith Coliseum; Oxford, MS
January 19, 2008; 9:00 pm, ESPN		Kentucky; ESPN College GameDay	W 81–70 ^{OT}	16–3 (3–1)	O'Connell Center; Gainesville, FL
January 23, 2008; 8:00 pm, Raycom		at South Carolina	W 73–71	17–3 (4–1)	Colonial Center; Columbia, SC
January 27, 2008; 1:00 pm, Raycom		No. 13 Vanderbilt	W 86–64	18–3 (5–1)	O'Connell Center; Gainesville, FL
February 2, 2008; 3:00 pm, Raycom	No. 19	at Arkansas	L 61–80	18–4 (5–2)	Bud Walton Arena; Fayetteville, AR
February 5, 2008; 9:00 pm, ESPN	No. 22	at No. 7 Tennessee	L 82–104	18–5 (5–3)	Thompson-Boling Arena; Knoxville, TN
February 9, 2008; 3:00 pm, Raycom	No. 22	Georgia	W 77–67	19–5 (6–3)	O'Connell Center; Gainesville, FL
February 13, 2008; 8:00 pm, Raycom		LSU	L 73–85	19–6 (6–4)	O'Connell Center; Gainesville, FL
February 16, 2008; 3:00 pm, Raycom		at No. 19 Vanderbilt	L 58–61	19–7 (6–5)	Memorial Gymnasium; Nashville, TN
February 20, 2008; 8:00 pm, Raycom		South Carolina	W 85–82	20–7 (7–5)	O'Connell Center; Gainesville, FL
February 27, 2008; 7:30 pm, SUN		at Georgia	W 77–64	21–7 (8–5)	Stegeman Coliseum; Athens, GA
March 1, 2008; 4:00 pm, CBS		Mississippi State	L 59–68	21–8 (8–6)	O'Connell Center; Gainesville, FL
March 5, 2008; 9:00 pm, Raycom		No. 4 Tennessee	L 86–89	21–9 (8–7)	O'Connell Center; Gainesville, FL
March 9, 2008; 12:00 pm, CBS		at Kentucky	L 70–75	21–10 (8–8)	Rupp Arena; Lexington, KY
SEC tournament
March 13, 2008; 7:30 pm, Raycom		vs. Alabama; SEC tournament first round	L 69–80	21–11	Georgia Dome; Atlanta, GA
National Invitation Tournament
March 19, 2008; 9:00 pm, ESPN2	No. 2	No. 7 San Diego St; NIT First Round	W 73–49	22–11	O'Connell Center; Gainesville, FL
March 21, 2008; 9:30 pm, ESPNU	No. 2	No. 3 Creighton; NIT Second Round	W 82–54	23–11	O'Connell Center; Gainesville, FL
March 25, 2008; 9:00 pm, ESPN	No. 2	at No. 1 Arizona State; NIT Quarterfinal	W 70–57	24–11	Wells Fargo Arena; Tempe, AZ
April 1, 2008; 7:00 pm, ESPN2	No. 2	vs. No. 2 Massachusetts; NIT Semifinal	L 66–78	24–12	Madison Square Garden; New York City, NY
*Non-conference game. ^{#}Rankings from Coaches' Poll. (#) Tournament seedings in parentheses.
