= Darian Townes =

American professional basketball player

Personal information
- Born: July 31, 1984 (age 42) Alexandria, Virginia, U.S.
- Listed height: 6 ft 10 in (2.08 m)
- Listed weight: 250 lb (113 kg)

Career information
- High school: Hargrave Military
- College: University of Arkansas (2005–2008)
- NBA draft: 2008: undrafted
- Playing career: 2008–2019
- Position: Power forward

Career history
- 2008: PGE Turów Zgorzelec
- 2009: Erie BayHawks
- 2009: Leones de Ponce
- 2009: GasTerra Flames
- 2009–2010: Utah Flash
- 2010: Iowa Energy
- 2010–2011: Soproni KC
- 2011–2012: MJUS-Fortress Körmend
- 2012: Busan KT Sonicboom
- 2012–2013: Seoul Samsung Thunders
- 2013: Link Tochigi Brex
- 2013–2014: Jeonju KCC Egis
- 2014: Soproni KC
- 2014–2015: Fubon Braves
- 2015–2016: Pauian Archiland
- 2016–2017: Champville SC
- 2017–2018: Al Mouttahed Tripoli
- 2018: Reales de La Vega
- 2018–2019: Atlas Ferzol
- 2019: Samsunspor

Career highlights
- All-SEC Tournament team (2008); All-SEC Freshmen team (2006); SBL Best Foreign Player of the year (2015)

Darian Townes (born July 31, 1984) is an American professional basketball player who plays for Sporting Al Riyadi Beirut of the Lebanese Basketball League. He played college basketball for the University of Arkansas.

== Professional career ==
After going undrafted in the 2008 NBA draft, Townes signed with the Polish basketball team, PGE Turów Zgorzelec. In his first game with Turow Zgorzelec, he scored 5 points and 2 rebounds in a 82-65 win over the Legia Warsaw.

On January 24, 2020, Townes signed with the Lebanese team, Sporting Al Riyadi Beirut for the 2020 season.
