= Tyler Smith (basketball, born 1986) =

American basketball player (born 1986)

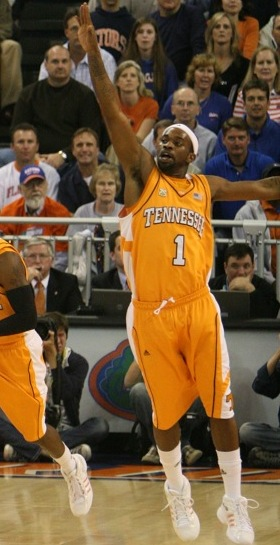

Personal information
- Born: September 4, 1986 (age 40) Pulaski, Tennessee, U.S.
- Listed height: 6 ft 7 in (2.01 m)
- Listed weight: 215 lb (98 kg)

Career information
- High school: Giles County (Pulaski, Tennessee); Hargrave Military Academy (Chatham, Virginia)
- College: Iowa (2006–2007); Tennessee (2007–2010)
- NBA draft: 2010: undrafted
- Playing career: 2010–2020
- Position: Small forward / shooting guard

Career history
- 2010–2011: Bornova
- 2011–2012: BBC Bayreuth
- 2012–2013: Hapoel Holon
- 2013–2014: Boulazac BD
- 2014–2015: Socar Petkim
- 2015–2016: Paffoni Omegna
- 2016–2017: Akhisar Belediyespor
- 2017–2018: İstanbulspor Beylikdüzü
- 2018–2019: Elitzur Eito Ashkelon

Career highlights
- 2× First-team All-SEC (2008, 2009)

David Tyler Smith (born September 4, 1986) is an American former professional basketball player. He played college basketball for Iowa and Tennessee, but his college career came to an end when he was dismissed from the Tennessee program in January 2010. He also earned the Bertelkamp Basketball Scholarship Endowment Fund and the Dane Bradshaw Endowed Athletic Scholarship. He spent his professional career playing overseas.

== High school career ==
He earned tournament MVP honors as a sophomore after leading the Bobcats to the state title. He earned first team all-state honors as a junior after averaging 24 points, nine rebounds and five assists as a junior at Giles County High School. Smith averaged 20 points, 10 rebounds and just over five assists per game at Hargrave Military Academy in Chatham, Va., in 2005–06. He helped lead Hargrave to a 28–2 record while ranking as one of the top prep school teams in the nation. He was a Second team selection on the Street & Smith's 2004 Boys High School all-America team, and was rated a four-star prospect by Rivals.com. He was the 2005 Tennessee Mr. Basketball, averaging 26 points per game as a senior.

== Collegiate career ==
=== Iowa Hawkeyes (2006–2007) ===
Smith started 29 of 31 games for the Hawkeyes as a freshman, leading the team in both rebounding and steals. He was the third freshman in school history to lead the Hawkeyes in rebounding. Additionally, Smith was second on the team in scoring (averaging 14.9 ppg) and assists. His season resulted in his being named to third-team All-Big Ten as well as to the All-Big Ten Freshman Team. Smith transferred to Tennessee after his freshman season in order to be closer to his father, who was suffering from lung cancer.

=== Tennessee Volunteers (2007–2010) ===
==== Sophomore Season (2007–08) ====
He transferred from Iowa and was granted a waiver by the Administrative Review Subcommittee to be eligible to play for the Volunteers at the start of 2007–08 season instead of sitting out a season as would normally be required. He led the Vols in assists, rebounding, and field goal percentage and was third in scoring. He ranked second on the team with 50 steals, increasing his season averages in SEC play, averaging 13.5 points and 7.8 rebounds. In SEC games, ranked 4th among the league leaders in offensive rebounds, 6th in field goal percentage, 7th in rebounding, 9th in assists, 9th in assists/turnover ratio and averaged 13.5 points per game. He started 35 of UT's 36 games. He was named the SEC Player of the Week after leading the Vols to wins over Auburn and at top-ranked Memphis. Scored in double figures in 31 of 36 games and had six double-doubles. He and teammate Chris Lofton were both named to the All-SEC first team.

==== Junior Season (2008–09) ====
He was a team leader and the only Vol to start all 34 games during the season, played primarily at the four spot but also saw time at the three position. He led the Vols in scoring 18 times, assists 16 times and rebounding 10 times. He also led the team with 17.4 points per game (6th in SEC), 3.4 assists per game (8th in the SEC), and a .766 free-throw percentage (8th in the SEC). Ranked 6th in the SEC in assist-to-turnover ratio 1.6, 7th in the SEC with 32.6 minutes played per game and 12th in the SEC in field-goal percentage .439. During the season Smith also had the first triple-double in Tennessee history against UNC Asheville and became the 42nd member of UT's 1,000-point club. He earned All-Tournament Team honors at the Old Spice Classic, averaging 17.3 points, 4.3 rebounds and 3.0 assists in UT's three games against Siena, Georgetown and Gonzaga. Smith totaled 57 points in three games while leading the Vols to their first SEC Tournament championship game appearance since 1991. He went 10-of-10 at the free-throw line and scored a game-high 21 points vs. Oklahoma State in the NCAA Tournament.

Smith was named first-team All-SEC unanimously.

==== Senior Season (2009–10) ====
In his last season at Tennessee he averaged 11.7 points per game and 4.7 rebounds, starting 12 early season games. On January 1, 2010, Tyler Smith, Cameron Tatum, Brian Williams, and Melvin Goins were arrested for weapons charges and marijuana possession. Bruce Pearl suspended the four players. Tyler Smith was dismissed from the team, Goins and Tatum were reinstated, while Williams remained on indefinite suspension. Williams was reinstated to the team on Sat., February 6, 2010.

=== College Stats ===
Season Totals

SEASON	TEAM	G	MIN	PTS	PPG	REB	AST	TO	A/T	STL	BLK	PF	FG%	FT%	3P%	PPS
2006–07	Iowa	31	33.7	461	14.9	153	111	92	.83	45	8	79	44	.727	.254	1.17
2007–08	Tennessee	36	28.3	489	13.6	242	122	79	1.02	50	20	92	54	.706	.378	1.45
2008–09	Tennessee	34	32.6	590	17.4	196	114	70	.60	25	7	72	44	.766	.292	1.32
2009–10	Tennessee	12	26.8	140	11.6	56	44	19	.60	17	3	24	57	.697	.000	1.72

== Professional career ==
After his dismissal from Tennessee, Smith signed a two-month contract with Bornova Belediye in the Turkish basketball league in March 2010. He was eligible for the 2010 NBA draft, but was not selected. Some credit this to his legal problems. On January 24, 2013, he signed a contract with Boulazac Basket Dordogne Club in France.

On December 5, 2018, Smith returned to Israel for a second stint, signing with Elitzur Eito Ashkelon for the rest of the season. In 22 games played for Ashkelon, he averaged 16 points, 8.6 rebounds and 2.5 assists per game, shooting 66 percent from 2-point range.
