= 2007–08 Pacific-10 Conference men's basketball season =

2007–08 Pac-10 Men's Basketball Season
- League: NCAA Division I
- Sport: Basketball
- Teams: 10

Regular Season
- Champion: UCLA
- Runners-up: Stanford
- Season MVP: Kevin Love, UCLA
- Top scorer: Ryan Anderson, California

Tournament
- Champions: UCLA
- Runners-up: Stanford
- Finals MVP: Darren Collison, UCLA

Basketball seasons

2007–08 Pacific-10 Conference men's basketball standings
	Conf.				Overall
Team	W		L	PCT	W		L	PCT
No. 2 UCLA†	16	–	2	.889	35	–	4	.897
No. 11 Stanford	13	–	5	.722	28	–	8	.778
No. 21 Washington State	11	–	7	.611	26	–	9	.743
Arizona State	9	–	9	.500	21	–	13	.618
Oregon	9	–	9	.500	18	–	14	.563
Arizona	8	–	10	.444	19	–	15	.559
Washington	7	–	11	.389	16	–	17	.485
California	6	–	12	.333	17	–	16	.515
Oregon State	0	–	18	.000	6	–	25	.194
USC*	0	–	7	.000	0	–	12	.000
† Conference tournament winner As of April 5, 2008; Rankings from AP Poll; *USC vacated 11 conference and 21 overall wins, due to NCAA rules violations.

The 2007–08 Pacific-10 Conference men's basketball season ended with six teams participating in the 2008 NCAA Men's Division I Basketball Tournament, two teams playing in the National Invitation Tournament (NIT) and one team playing in the College Basketball Invitational (CBI).

UCLA won the regular season & conference tournament championship and Stanford head coach Trent Johnson was named coach of the year.

Only three teams, UCLA, UCLA (#2), Stanford (#11) and Washington State (#21) finished the season in the ESPN/USA Today Coaches Poll. They were #3, #11, and #21 respectively in the "AP Top 25" polls. In the final post-NCAA tournament coaches' poll, UCLA dropped to #4, Stanford stayed at #11 and Washington State moved to #15.

== Pre-season ==
Hall of Fame basketball coach Lute Olson, who had been the head coach of the Arizona Wildcats for 24 seasons, had to take a personal leave of absence and Kevin O'Neill took over for the season on an interim basis.

Pac-10 teams participated in the Pac-10/Big 12 Series. They also took part in other x-season tournament games, including the College Basketball Experience Classic, the NIT Season Tip-Off in Madison Square Garden and the Anaheim Classic in the Anaheim Convention Center. Arizona State played in the Maui Invitational Tournament.

== Conference games ==
Oregon was first in scoring offense, field goal percentage and 3-point field goal percentage while Washington State was first in scoring defense. Stanford was first rebounding while California was first in free throw percentage in conference games. UCLA was on top in scoring margin. Arizona led the conference in attendance with a total of 241,703 in 17 games, averaging 14,218 (14,545 capacity).

== Conference tournament ==
UCLA, the #1 seed team, won the 2008 Pacific Life Pacific-10 Conference men's basketball tournament at the Staples Center in Los Angeles, California on March 15, in front of a crowd of 18,672. The team defeated #2 seed Stanford and won the school's third tournament championship. The Bruins received the conference's automatic bid to the NCAA National Tournament.

Play-in Round; March 12
8	Washington	81
9	California	84
7	Arizona	87
10	Oregon State	56

Quarterfinals; March 13
1	#3 UCLA	88
9	California	66
4	USC*	59*
5	Arizona State	55
3	#21 Washington State	75
6	Oregon	70
2	#11 Stanford	75
7	Arizona	64

Semifinals; March 14
1	#3 UCLA	57
4	USC	54
3	#21 Washington State	68
2	#11 Stanford	75

Final; March 15
1	#3 UCLA	67
2	#11 Stanford	64

* Denotes a vacated win, as the result of a January 3, 2010 announcement that USC has vacated all wins during the 2007–2008 season, including its Pac-10 Conference tournament victory over Arizona State (therefore, USC finished the season with a record of 0–12).

== Postseason ==
Six Pac-10 teams participated in the 2008 NCAA Men's Division I Basketball Tournament. Three teams won their first-round games and all three would go on to play in their regional semi-finals. UCLA would go on to advance to the Final Four, their 18th Final Four in school history. They would go on to lose to the Memphis Tigers 63–78.

Arizona State and California played in the NIT. Arizona State lost in their regional Quarterfinals against Florida 57–70. California lost in the Second round to Ohio State 56–73.

Washington played in the College Basketball Invitational (CBI), where they would lose their opening round game 71–72 to Valparaiso.

== Highlights and notes ==
Oregon State fired head coach Jay John after the Beavers started 0–6 in conference, he only had 1 winning season in five and half years at Oregon State. Kevin Mouton took over in the interim for the remainder of the season.

Two days after losing to Ohio State in the 2008 NIT, California fired head coach Ben Braun and would be replaced by former Stanford head coach Mike Montgomery.

On April 10, 2008, Stanford basketball coach announced he was leaving the program for LSU. On April 27, former Duke assistant Johnny Dawkins would becoming the 17th head coach in Stanford basketball history.

In October 2008, Arizona Wildcats hall of fame coach Lute Olson would announce his retirement from the sport for health reasons. He ended his career at Arizona with a 589–187 record, four final fours and one national title. The 589 wins would be a conference record and amassed 780–280 overall, which at the time was 10th most in wins all time. Russ Pennell became the interim head coach on October 24.

== Awards and honors ==
=== All-Americans ===
Kevin Love (C, Freshman), of UCLA was named to the 2008 Consensus All-America first team. He was listed on the Associated Press, the USBWA, and the Sporting News All-American lists to qualify for the "Consensus All-America". Ryan Anderson (PF, Sophomore), of California was a Sporting News Second team All-American. Darren Collison, (PG, Junior) was an Associated Press Third team All-American.

The following players from Pac-10 were honored on the AP All American list:

First Team (Player, School, Ht, Wt, Yr, Key stats)

- Kevin Love, UCLA, 6–10, 260, Fr., 17.5 ppg, 10.6 rpg, 1.9 apg, 29.6 min., 55.9 fg pct

Second Team (Player, School, Ht, Wt, Yr, Key stats)

- Ryan Anderson, California, 6–9, 240, So., 21.1 ppg, 9.9 rpg, 1.4 apg, 32.8 min., 49.0 fg pct

Third Team (Player, School, Ht, Wt, Yr, Key stats)

- Darren Collison, UCLA, 6–1, 160, Jr., 14.5 ppg, 2.6 rpg, 3.8 apg, 34.7 min., 48.1 fg pct

Honorable mention (Player, School)

- Jerryd Bayless, Arizona
- Jon Brockman, Washington
- James Harden, Arizona State
- O. J. Mayo, USC

=== All-Pac-10 teams ===
Regular season honors:

- Player of The Year: Kevin Love, UCLA
- Freshman of The Year: Kevin Love, UCLA
- Defensive Player of The Year: Russell Westbrook, UCLA
- Coach of The Year: Trent Johnson, Stanford

First team

(Name, School, Pos, Yr, Ht, Wt, Hometown (Last School))

- Ryan Anderson, CAL, F, So., 6–9, 240, El Dorado Hills, Cali. (Oak Ridge)
- James Harden, ASU, G, Fr., 6–5, 218, Los Angeles, Calif. (Artesia HS)
- Brook Lopez, STAN, F, So., 7–0, 260, Fresno, Cali. (San Joaquin Memorial)
- Kevin Love, UCLA, C Fr., 6–10, 260, Lake Oswego, Ore. (Lake Oswego)
- O.J. Mayo, USC, G, Fr., 6–5, 210, Huntington, W.V. (Huntington High School)

Second team

- Jerry Bayless, ARIZ, G, Fr., 6–3, 200, Phoenix, Ariz. (St. Mary's)
- Jon Brockman, WASH, F, Sr., 6–7, 255, Snohomish, Wash. (Snohomish HS)
- Darren Collison, UCLA, G, Jr., 6–0, 160, Rancho Cucamonga, Calif. (Etiwanda HS)
- Maarty Leunen, ORE, F, Sr., 6–9, 180, Redmond, Ore. (Redmond)
- Kyle Weaver, WSU, G, Sr., 6–6, 200, Beloit, Wisc. (Beloit Memorial)

Third team

- Chase Budinger, ARIZ, F, So., 6–7, 218, Encinitas, Calif. (LaCosta Canyon HS)
- Taj Gibson, USC, F, So., 6–9, 215, Brooklyn, N.Y. (Calvary Christian)
- Derrick Low, WSU, G, Sr., 6–2, 175, Honolulu, Haw. (ʻIolani School)
- Jeff Pendergraph, ASU, F, Jr., 6–9, 240, Etiwanda, Calif. (Etiwanda HS)
- Russell Westbrook, UCLA, G, Fr., 6–3, 187, Lawndale, Cali (Leuzinger)

=== All-Academic ===
The 2007–08 Pacific-10 Conference Men's Basketball All-Academic teams (minimum 3.0 overall grade-point average and be either a starter or significant contributor):

First Team (School, Year, GPA, Major)

- Bret Brielmaier, ARIZ, Sr., 3.04, Interdisciplinary Studies
- Robbie Cowgill, WSU, Sr. 3.36, Management Operations
- Taj Finger, STAN, Sr., 3.06, Communication
- Daven Harmeling, WSU, Jr., 3.51, Health and Fitness Education
- Taylor Rochestie, WSU, Jr. 3.27, Communication

Second Team (School, Year, GPA, Major)

- Alfred Aboya, UCLA, Jr. 3.06, Political Science
- Aron Baynes, WSU, Jr., 3.15, Movement Studies
- Nikola Knezevic, CAL, So., 3.21, Interdisciplinary Studies
- Nikola Koprivica, WSU, So., 3.31, Undeclared
- Roeland Schaftenaar, OSU, Jr., 3.17, Pre-Business

Robbie Cowgill, of Washington State, was named a Pacific-10 Conference winter Scholar-Athletes of the Year.

== NBA draft ==
Round	Pick	Player	Position	Nationality	Team	School/club team
1	3	O.J. Mayo	SG	United States	Minnesota Timberwolves (traded to Memphis)	USC (Fr.)
1	4	Russell Westbrook	PG	United States	Seattle SuperSonics	UCLA (So.)
1	5	Kevin Love	PF	United States	Memphis Grizzlies (traded to Minnesota)	UCLA (Fr.)
1	10	Brook Lopez	C	United States	New Jersey Nets	Stanford (So.)
1	11	Jerryd Bayless	PG	United States	Indiana Pacers (traded to Portland)	Arizona (Fr.)
1	15	Robin Lopez	C	United States	Phoenix Suns (from Atlanta)	Stanford (So.)
1	21	Ryan Anderson	PF	United States	New Jersey Nets (from Dallas)	California (So.)
2	37	Luc Mbah a Moute	SF	Cameroon	Milwaukee Bucks	UCLA (Jr.)
2	38	Kyle Weaver	SG	United States	Charlotte Bobcats	Washington State (Sr.)
2	48	Malik Hairston	SG	United States	Phoenix Suns (from Cleveland, traded to San Antonio)	Oregon (Sr.)
2	50	DeVon Hardin	C	United States	Seattle SuperSonics (from Denver)	California (Sr.)
2	54	Maarty Leunen	PF	United States	Houston	Oregon (Sr.)
