= 2007–08 California Golden Bears men's basketball team =

American college basketball season

2007–08 California Golden Bears men's basketball

National Invitation Tournament, Second round
- Conference: Pacific-10 Conference
- Record: 17–16 (6–12 Pac-10)
- Head coach: Ben Braun
- Assistant coach: Gregg Gottlieb
- Home arena: Haas Pavilion

2007–08 Pacific-10 Conference men's basketball standings
	Conf.				Overall
Team	W		L	PCT	W		L	PCT
No. 2 UCLA†	16	–	2	.889	35	–	4	.897
No. 11 Stanford	13	–	5	.722	28	–	8	.778
No. 21 Washington State	11	–	7	.611	26	–	9	.743
Arizona State	9	–	9	.500	21	–	13	.618
Oregon	9	–	9	.500	18	–	14	.563
Arizona	8	–	10	.444	19	–	15	.559
Washington	7	–	11	.389	16	–	17	.485
California	6	–	12	.333	17	–	16	.515
Oregon State	0	–	18	.000	6	–	25	.194
USC*	0	–	7	.000	0	–	12	.000
† Conference tournament winner As of April 5, 2008; Rankings from AP Poll; *USC vacated 11 conference and 21 overall wins, due to NCAA rules violations.

The 2007–08 California Golden Bears men's basketball team represented the University of California, Berkeley in the 2007–08 NCAA Division I men's basketball season. This was head coach Ben Braun's 12th season at California. The Golden Bears played their home games at Haas Pavilion and participated in the Pacific-10 Conference.

The Golden Bears finished the season 17–16 and went 11–7 in Pac-10 play to finish in ninth place. They lost to UCLA in the quarterfinals of the Pac-10 tournament. They received an invite to the 2008 National Invitation Tournament, where they were beaten by Ohio State in the second round. Coach Ben Braun was fired at the end of the season.

== Roster ==
2008–09 California Golden Bears men's basketball team
Players
Coaches

Pos.	#	Name	Height	Weight	Year	Hometown
G	0	Nican Robinson (W)	5 ft 10 in (1.78 m)	185 lb (84 kg)	RS So	Oakland, California
C	1	Max Zhang (redshirt)	7 ft 3 in (2.21 m)	225 lb (102 kg)	Fr	Yantai City, China
F	2	Jordan Fillmore (injured) (W)	6 ft 8 in (2.03 m)	240 lb (109 kg)	Fr	Lafayette, California
G	3	Jerome Randle	5 ft 10 in (1.78 m)	160 lb (73 kg)	So	Chicago, Illinois
F	10	Jamal Boykin	6 ft 8 in (2.03 m)	230 lb (104 kg)	RS So	Los Angeles, California
F	12	Thomas Fang (W)	6 ft 5 in (1.96 m)	210 lb (95 kg)	So	San Jose, California
G	13	Nikola Knezevic	6 ft 3 in (1.91 m)	185 lb (84 kg)	RS So	Belgrade, Serbia
F	14	Eric Vierneisel	6 ft 7 in (2.01 m)	205 lb (93 kg)	Sr	Algonquin, Illinois
G	15	David Liss (W)	5 ft 11 in (1.8 m)	170 lb (77 kg)	So	San Francisco, California
G	20	Patrick Armstrong (W)	5 ft 11 in (1.8 m)	215 lb (98 kg)	So	Compton, California
F	21	Omondi Amoke (redshirt)	6 ft 7 in (2.01 m)	215 lb (98 kg)	Fr	Oxnard, California
G	22	Eddie Miller (W)	6 ft 5 in (1.96 m)	190 lb (86 kg)	Fr	Antioch, California
G	23	Patrick Christopher	6 ft 5 in (1.96 m)	215 lb (98 kg)	So	Compton, California
F	24	Theo Robertson	6 ft 6 in (1.98 m)	225 lb (102 kg)	RS Jr	Pittsburgh, California
C	32	Taylor Harrison	6 ft 10 in (2.08 m)	220 lb (100 kg)	RS So	San Clemente, California
C	33	Jordan Wilkes	7 ft 0 in (2.13 m)	225 lb (102 kg)	RS So	Los Angeles, California
F	34	Ryan Anderson	6 ft 10 in (2.08 m)	240 lb (109 kg)	So	El Dorado Hills, California
C	35	DeVon Hardin	6 ft 11 in (2.11 m)	250 lb (113 kg)	Sr	Newark, California
F	43	Harper Kamp	6 ft 8 in (2.03 m)	255 lb (116 kg)	Fr	Mesa, Arizona

Head coach

- Ben Braun

Assistant coach(es)

Gregg Gottlieb

Legend

- (C) Team captain
- (S) Suspended
- (I) Ineligible
- (W) Walk-on
- Injured
- Current redshirt

Roster
Last update: 13 March 2025

== Schedule and results ==
Date time, TV	Rank^{#}	Opponent^{#}	Result	Record	Site (attendance) city, state
Non-conference regular season
Nov 14, 2007*		Southern Miss	W 67–59	1–0	Haas Pavilion; Berkeley, California
Nov 19, 2007*		Nicholls State	W 74–62	2–0	Haas Pavilion; Berkeley, California
Nov 24, 2007*		San Diego State	W 77–69	3–0	Haas Pavilion; Berkeley, California
Nov 28, 2007*		at Nevada	W 74–68	4–0	Lawlor Events Center; Reno, Nevada
Dec 1, 2007*; 6:00 p.m., FSN		Missouri	W 86–72	5–0	Haas Pavilion (7,115); Berkeley, California
Dec 5, 2007*		Jackson State	W 117–74	6–0	Haas Pavilion; Berkeley, California
Dec 9, 2007*; 11:00 a.m., FSN Midwest		at Kansas State	L 75–82	6–1	Bramlage Coliseum (5,274); Manhattan, Kansas
Dec 20, 2007*		Delaware State	W 74–57	7–1	Haas Pavilion; Berkeley, California
Dec 22, 2007*; CSN West		Utah	L 65–67	7–2	Haas Pavilion; Berkeley, California
Dec 28, 2007*		Long Beach State	W 102–65	8–2	Haas Pavilion; Berkeley, California
Dec 29, 2007*		North Dakota State	W 86–72	9–2	Haas Pavilion; Berkeley, California
Pac-10 regular season
Jan 3, 2008; 7:30 pm		No. 22 USC	W 92–82	10–2 (1–0)	Haas Pavilion (9,214); Berkeley, California
Jan 5, 2008; 3:00 pm, FSN		No. 5 UCLA	L 58–70	10–3 (1–1)	Haas Pavilion (11,877); Berkeley, California
Jan 10, 2008; 6:00 pm		at Oregon	L 70–79	10–4 (1–2)	McArthur Court (8,817); Eugene, Oregon
Jan 12, 2008; 1:35 pm, FSN		at Oregon State	W 69–59	11–4 (2–2)	Gill Coliseum (4,118); Corvallis, Oregon
Jan 17, 2008; 7:30 pm		No. 22 Arizona State	L 90–99 ^{2OT}	11–5 (2–3)	Haas Pavilion (7,604); Berkeley, California
Jan 19, 2008; 5:00 pm, CSN West		Arizona	L 75–79	11–6 (2–4)	Haas Pavilion (9,124); Berkeley, California
Jan 26, 2008; 4:00 pm, CSN West		Stanford	L 77–82	11–7 (2–5)	Haas Pavilion (10,077); Berkeley, California
Jan 31, 2008; 7:05 pm		at No. 9 Washington State	W 69–64	12–7 (3–5)	Friel Court (8,810); Pullman, Washington
Feb 2, 2008; 3:00 pm, FSN Bay Area Plus		at Washington	W 79–75	13–7 (4–5)	Bank of America Arena (9,404); Seattle, Washington
Feb 7, 2008; 7:30 pm		Oregon State	W 81–76	14–7 (5–5)	Haas Pavilion (7,077); Berkeley, California
Feb 9, 2008; 4:00 pm, CSN West		Oregon	L 70–92	14–8 (5–6)	Haas Pavilion (10,407); Berkeley, California
Feb 14, 2008; 6:30 pm, CSN West		at Arizona	L 73–83	14–9 (5–7)	McKale Center (14,472); Tucson, Arizona
Feb 16, 2008; 4:00 pm, CSN West		at Arizona State	W 76–73	15–9 (6–7)	Wells Fargo Arena (9,827); Tempe, Arizona
Feb 24, 2008; 6:00 pm, FSN		at Stanford	L 69–79	15–10 (6–8)	Maples Pavilion (7,329); Stanford, California
Feb 28, 2008; 8:00 pm, FSN		No. 22 Washington State	L 49–70	15–11 (6–9)	Haas Pavilion (8,282); Berkeley, California
Mar 1, 2008; 3:00 pm, CSN West		Washington	L 84–87	15–12 (6–10)	Haas Pavilion (8,640); Berkeley, California
Mar 6, 2008; 7:30 pm		at USC	L 89–93 ^{OT}	15–13 (6–12)	Galen Center (9,102); Los Angeles, California
Mar 8, 2008; 12:30 pm, ABC		at No. 3 UCLA	L 80–81	15–14 (6–12)	Pauley Pavilion (11,614); Los Angeles, California
Pac-10 tournament
Mar 12, 2008; 6:00 pm, FSN	(9)	vs. (8) Washington	W 84–81	16–14	Staples Center; Los Angeles, California
Mar 13, 2008; 2:30 pm, FSN	(9)	vs. (1) No. 3 UCLA	L 66–88	16–15	Staples Center (17,194); Los Angeles, California
National Invitation Tournament
Mar 19, 2008*; 8:00 pm	(4)	(5) New Mexico; First round	W 68–66	17–15	Haas Pavilion (1,906); Berkeley, California
Mar 24, 2008*; 4:00 pm	(4)	at (1) Ohio State; Second round	L 56–73	17–16	St. John Arena (13,276); Columbus, Ohio
*Non-conference game. ^{#}Rankings from AP poll. (#) Tournament seedings in parentheses. All times are in Pacific.
