= 2007–08 Arizona Wildcats men's basketball team =

American college basketball season

2007–08 Arizona Wildcats men's basketball

NCAA Tournament, Round of 64
- Conference: Pacific-10 Conference
- Record: 0–14 (19 wins, 1 loss vacated) (0–10 (8 wins vacated) Pac-10)
- Head coach: Kevin O'Neill (1st season)
- Home arena: McKale Center

2007–08 Pacific-10 Conference men's basketball standings
	Conf.				Overall
Team	W		L	PCT	W		L	PCT
No. 2 UCLA†	16	–	2	.889	35	–	4	.897
No. 11 Stanford	13	–	5	.722	28	–	8	.778
No. 21 Washington State	11	–	7	.611	26	–	9	.743
Arizona State	9	–	9	.500	21	–	13	.618
Oregon	9	–	9	.500	18	–	14	.563
Arizona	8	–	10	.444	19	–	15	.559
Washington	7	–	11	.389	16	–	17	.485
California	6	–	12	.333	17	–	16	.515
Oregon State	0	–	18	.000	6	–	25	.194
USC*	0	–	7	.000	0	–	12	.000
† Conference tournament winner As of April 5, 2008; Rankings from AP Poll; *USC vacated 11 conference and 21 overall wins, due to NCAA rules violations.

The 2007–08 Arizona Wildcats men's basketball team represented the University of Arizona during the 2007–08 NCAA Division I men's basketball season. The Wildcats, led by first year head coach Kevin O'Neill, played their home games at the McKale Center and are members of the Pacific-10 Conference.

== Recruiting class ==
College recruiting information
Name	Hometown	School	Height	Weight	Commit date
Jerryd Bayless; SG	Phoenix, Arizona	St. Mary's High School	6 ft 3 in (1.91 m)	185 lb (84 kg)	Aug 16, 2006
Jerryd Bayless; SG	Recruit ratings: Scout: Rivals: (97)				
Jamelle Horne; SF	San Diego, California	San Diego Senior High School	6 ft 6 in (1.98 m)	180 lb (82 kg)	Jan 16, 2006
Jamelle Horne; SF	Recruit ratings: Scout: Rivals: (96)				
Alex Jacobson; C	Santa Ana, California	Mater Dei High School	7 ft 0 in (2.13 m)	220 lb (100 kg)	Oct 17, 2005
Alex Jacobson; C	Recruit ratings: Scout: Rivals: (80)				
Zane Johnson; SF	Phoenix, Arizona	Thunderbird High School	6 ft 6 in (1.98 m)	200 lb (91 kg)	Jul 1, 2006
Zane Johnson; SF	Recruit ratings: Scout: Rivals: (NR)				
Laval Lucas-Perry; SG	Flint, Michigan	Luke M Powers Catholic High School	6 ft 2 in (1.88 m)	175 lb (79 kg)	Jul 19, 2006
Laval Lucas-Perry; SG	Recruit ratings: Scout: Rivals: (92)				
Overall recruit ranking: Scout: 8 Rivals: 5
Note: In many cases, Scout, Rivals, 247Sports, On3, and ESPN may conflict in their listings of height and weight.; In these cases, the average was taken. ESPN grades are on a 100-point scale.; Sources: "ESPN". ESPN.; "2007 Team Ranking". Rivals.

== Roster ==
2007–08 Arizona Wildcats men's basketball team
Players
Coaches

Pos.	#	Name	Height	Weight	Year	Hometown
G	0	Jerryd Bayless	6 ft 3 in (1.91 m)	193 lb (88 kg)	Fr	Phoenix, Arizona
F	2	Zane Johnson	6 ft 5 in (1.96 m)	204 lb (93 kg)	Fr	Phoenix, Arizona
G	5	Jawann McClellan	6 ft 4 in (1.93 m)	204 lb (93 kg)	Sr	Houston, Texas
G	11	David Bagga	6 ft 4 in (1.93 m)	180 lb (82 kg)	Jr	Santa Ana, California
G	12	Daniel Dillon	6 ft 3 in (1.91 m)	197 lb (89 kg)	Sr	Melbourne, Victoria
G	13	Nic Wise	5 ft 10 in (1.78 m)	180 lb (82 kg)	So	Kingwood, Texas
G	20	Laval Lucas-Perry	6 ft 3 in (1.91 m)	189 lb (86 kg)	Fr	Flint, Michigan
F	24	Fendi Onobun	6 ft 6 in (1.98 m)	239 lb (108 kg)	Jr	Houston, Texas
F	33	Mohamed Tangara	6 ft 9 in (2.06 m)	240 lb (109 kg)	Jr	Durham, North Carolina
F	34	Chase Budinger	6 ft 7 in (2.01 m)	190 lb (86 kg)	So	Encinitas, California
F	42	Jamelle Horne	6 ft 6 in (1.98 m)	209 lb (95 kg)	Fr	San Diego, California
F	43	Jordan Hill	6 ft 10 in (2.08 m)	220 lb (100 kg)	So	Patterson, North Carolina
F	44	Bret Brielmaier	6 ft 7 in (2.01 m)	237 lb (108 kg)	Sr	Mankato, Minnesota
C	50	Alex Jacobson (redshirt)	6 ft 11 in (2.11 m)	253 lb (115 kg)	Fr	Santa Ana, California
C	54	Kirk Walters	6 ft 11 in (2.11 m)	247 lb (112 kg)	RS Sr	Grand Rapids, Michigan

Head coach

- Kevin O'Neill (USC)

Assistant coach(es)

- Josh Pastner
- Miles Simon

Legend

- (C) Team captain
- (S) Suspended
- (I) Ineligible
- (W) Walk-on
- Injured
- Current redshirt

Roster
Last update: July 7, 2011

=== Depth chart ===
Pos.	Starting 5	Bench 1	Bench 2
C	Jordan Hill	Kirk Walters	Alex Jacobson
PF	Chase Budinger	Jamelle Horne	Mohamed Tangara
SF	Jawann McClellan	Bret Brielmaier	Fendi Onobun
SG	Jerryd Bayless	Zane Johnson	David Bagga
PG	Nic Wise	Daniel Dillion	Laval Lucas-Perry

== Schedule ==
Date time, TV	Rank^{#}	Opponent^{#}	Result	Record	Site (attendance) city, state
Regular season
November 13, 2007*; 7:30 pm, FSAZ	No. 17	Northern Arizona	W 76–69	1–0	McKale Center (13,903); Tucson, Arizona
November 17, 2007*; 8:30 pm, FSN	No. 17	Virginia	L 72–75	1–1	McKale Center (14,602); Tucson, Arizona
November 19, 2007*; 7:30 pm, FSAZ		UMKC	W 81–62	2–1	McKale Center (13,439); Tucson, Arizona
November 21, 2007*; 7:30 pm, FSAZ		Adam State	W 88–64	3–1	McKale Center (12,897); Tucson, Arizona
November 25, 2007*; 6:00 pm, ESPN		at No. 4 Kansas	L 72–76 ^{OT}	3–2	Allen Fieldhouse (16,300); Lawrence, Kansas
November 28, 2007*; 7:30 pm, FSAZ		Cal State Fullerton	W 91–65	4–2	McKale Center (13,153); Tucson, Arizona
December 2, 2007*; 4:00 pm, FSN		No. 9 Texas A&M	W 78–67	5–2	McKale Center (14,598); Tucson, Arizona
December 8, 2007*; 10:00 am, ESPN	No. 24	at Illinois	W 78–72 ^{OT}	6–2	United Center (19,573); Chicago, Illinois
December 16, 2007*; 1:00 pm, FSAZ	No. 22	Fresno State	W 69–50	7–2	McKale Center (13,501); Tucson, Arizona
December 19, 2007*; 7:00 pm, CSTV	No. 19	at UNLV	W 52–49	8–2	Thomas & Mack Center (13,676); Paradise, Nevada
December 22, 2007*; 1:00 pm, FSAZ	No. 19	San Diego State	W 74–58	9–2	McKale Center (14,608); Tucson, Arizona
December 29, 2007*; 8:00 pm, ESPN2	No. 18	at No. 2 Memphis	L 63–82	9–3	FedExForum (17,965); Memphis, Tennessee
January 3, 2008; 6:30 pm, FSAZ	No. 21	Oregon State	W 76–63	10–3 (1–0)	McKale Center (14,351); Tucson, Arizona
January 5, 2008; 12:00 pm, FSN	No. 21	Oregon	L 74–84	10–4 (1–1)	McKale Center (14,575); Tucson, Arizona
January 9, 2008; 7:30 pm, FSAZ	No. 24	at Arizona State	L 59–68 ^{OT}	10–5 (1–2)	Wells Fargo Arena (13,947); Tempe, Arizona
January 12, 2008*; 3:00 pm, ESPN2	No. 24	at Houston	W 85–71	11–5	Hofheinz Pavilion (7,917); Houston, Texas
January 17, 2008; 9:00 pm, FSN		at Stanford	L 52–56	11–6 (1–3)	Maples Pavilion (7,329); Stanford, California
January 19, 2008; 6:00 pm, FSAZ		at California	W 80–79	12–6 (2–3)	Haas Pavilion (9,124); Berkeley, California
January 24, 2008; 6:30 pm, FSN		No. 6 Washington State	W 76–64	13–6 (3–3)	McKale Center (14,598); Tucson, Arizona
January 26, 2008; 1:00 pm, FSN		Washington	W 84–69	14–6 (4–3)	McKale Center (14,602); Tucson, Arizona
January 31, 2008; 8:30 pm, FSN		at USC	W 80–69	15–6 (5–3)	Galen Center (10,258); Los Angeles, California
February 2, 2008; 7:00 pm, ESPN		at No. 5 UCLA; ESPN College GameDay	L 60–82	15–7 (5–4)	Pauley Pavilion (12,111); Los Angeles, California
February 10, 2008; 12:30 pm, FSN		Arizona State	L 54–59	15–8 (5–5)	McKale Center (14,598); Tucson, Arizona
February 14, 2008; 6:30 pm, FSAZ		California	W 83–73	16–8 (6–5)	McKale Center (14,472); Tucson, Arizona
February 16, 2008; 1:30 pm, ABC		No. 7 Stanford	L 66–67	16–9 (6–6)	McKale Center (14,589); Tucson, Arizona
February 21, 2008; 9:00 pm, FSAZ		at Washington	L 66–75	16–10 (6–7)	Bank of America Arena (9,529); Seattle, Washington
February 23, 2008; 8:00 pm, FSN		at No. 19 Washington State	W 65–55	17–10 (7–7)	Beasley Coliseum (10,288); Pullman, Washington
February 28, 2008; 7:00 pm, ESPN		USC	L 58–70	17–11 (7–8)	McKale Center (14,593); Tucson, Arizona
March 2, 2008; 2:00 pm, CBS		No. 4 UCLA	L 66–68	17–12 (7–9)	McKale Center (14,624); Tucson, Arizona
March 6, 2008; 7:00 pm, FSAZ		at Oregon State	W 81–45	18–12 (8–9)	Gill Coliseum (4,386); Corvallis, Oregon
March 8, 2008; 8:30 pm, FSN		at Oregon	L 69–78	18–13 (8–10)	McArthur Court (9,087); Eugene, Oregon
Pac-10 tournament
March 12, 2008; 8:30 pm, FSN		vs. Oregon State; First Round	W 86–57	19–13	Staples Center (11,642); Los Angeles, California
March 13, 2008; 8:30 pm, FSN		vs. No. 11 Stanford; Quarterfinal	L 64–75	19–14	Staples Center (16,442); Los Angeles, California
NCAA tournament
March 20, 2008*; 6:55 pm, CBS	(10)	vs. (7) West Virginia; First Round	L 65–75	19–15	Verizon Center (18,400); Washington, D.C.
*Non-conference game. ^{#}Rankings from AP Poll. (#) Tournament seedings in parentheses. All times are in Mountain Time.

== Awards ==
Jerryd Bayless

- Pac-10 All-Freshman First Team
- Pac-10 All-Conference Second Team
- Pac-10 Player of the Week – February 18, 2008

Chase Budinger

- Pac-10 All-Conference Third Team
- Pac-10 Player of the Week – February 2, 2009

Jordan Hill

- Pac-10 Player of the Week – December 10, 2007
