= 2007–08 Oregon Ducks men's basketball team =

American college basketball season

2007–08 Oregon Ducks men's basketball

NCAA tournament, Round of 64
- Conference: Pacific-10 Conference
- Record: 18–14 (9–9 Pac-10)
- Head coach: Ernie Kent
- Assistant coaches: Mark Hudson; Kenny Payne
- Home arena: McArthur Court

2007–08 Pacific-10 Conference men's basketball standings
	Conf.				Overall
Team	W		L	PCT	W		L	PCT
No. 2 UCLA†	16	–	2	.889	35	–	4	.897
No. 11 Stanford	13	–	5	.722	28	–	8	.778
No. 21 Washington State	11	–	7	.611	26	–	9	.743
Arizona State	9	–	9	.500	21	–	13	.618
Oregon	9	–	9	.500	18	–	14	.563
Arizona	8	–	10	.444	19	–	15	.559
Washington	7	–	11	.389	16	–	17	.485
California	6	–	12	.333	17	–	16	.515
Oregon State	0	–	18	.000	6	–	25	.194
USC*	0	–	7	.000	0	–	12	.000
† Conference tournament winner As of April 5, 2008; Rankings from AP Poll; *USC vacated 11 conference and 21 overall wins, due to NCAA rules violations.

The 2007–08 Oregon Ducks men's basketball team represented the University of Oregon in the college basketball season of 2007–08. The team was coached by Ernie Kent and played their home games at McArthur Court.

== Previous season ==
The 2006–07 Oregon Ducks experienced what many would argue as one of their most memorable and successful seasons in school history. Freshman Tajuan Porter, who was not heavily recruited, along with senior and leader Aaron Brooks helped lead the Ducks to a successful season. They began their season by completing their non-conference schedule at a perfect 12–0, including a come-from-behind win at Rice and an important east-coast win at then ranked #19 Georgetown. The Ducks suffered their first loss of the season against USC but were able to bounce back and defeat then ranked #1 UCLA marking the second time in school history the Ducks had defeated a #1 Bruins team. Towards the end of the season Oregon suffered a streak in which they lost 6 of 8 games, the skid dropped the Ducks from #7 to #23 in the AP Poll. However the Ducks managed to bounce back, winning 9 games in a row, including a sweep of the Pac-10 Championship Tournament – in dominating fashion – first round wins over Miami University (Ohio), Winthrop University, and a Sweet Sixteen victory over UNLV. Their final game of the season was a 77–85 loss to eventual NCAA men's basketball tournament champions, Florida.

== Pre-season ==
June 28 – Aaron Brooks was selected in the 2007 NBA draft as the 26th selection overall during the 1st round by the Houston Rockets.

July – Guard Tajuan Porter played on the United States' U19 team in the 2007 FIBA U19 World Championship. The tournament was played in Novi Sad, Serbia and the United States' team placed 2nd, suffering their first loss of the tournament to Serbia 69–74 in the championship game. Also, Forward Maarty Leunen played on the United States' Pan American Games team. The team place 5th in the tournament after a poor 3–2 final record in which the team lost the first two games.

November 1 – During the Pac-10's media day, the pre-season media poll picks the Ducks to finish third in the Pac-10.

== Recruiting ==
The 2008 University of Oregon Men's Basketball Recruiting Class was selected by Scout.com as the 11th best recruiting class of 2008 and was selected by Rivals.com as the 11th best recruiting class of 2008 as well.

Class of 2008 Recruits

College recruiting
Name	Hometown	School	Height	Weight	Commit date
Josh Crittle; C	Elmhurst, IL	Timothy Christian HS	6 ft 8 in (2.03 m)	225 lb (102 kg)	Oct 17, 2007
Josh Crittle; C	Recruit ratings: Scout: Rivals: (80)				
Michael Dunigan; C	Chicago, IL	Farragut Career Academy HS	6 ft 9 in (2.06 m)	240 lb (110 kg)	Jul 16, 2007
Michael Dunigan; C	Recruit ratings: Scout: Rivals: (90)				
Matthew Humphrey; SG	Chicago, IL	Hales Franciscan HS I	6 ft 5 in (1.96 m)	175 lb (79 kg)	Jul 16, 2007
Matthew Humphrey; SG	Recruit ratings: Scout: Rivals: (89)				
Drew Wiley; SF	Vida, OR	McKenzie River HS	6 ft 6 in (1.98 m)	185 lb (84 kg)	Dec 23, 2006
Drew Wiley; SF	Recruit ratings: Scout: Rivals: (80)				
Teondre Williams; SG	Norcross, GA	Meadowcreek HS	6 ft 4 in (1.93 m)	180 lb (82 kg)	Nov 5, 2007
Teondre Williams; SG	Recruit ratings: Scout: Rivals: (86)				

== Schedule ==
Date time, TV	Rank^{#}	Opponent^{#}	Result	Record	Site (attendance) city, state
11/10/2007*; 4:00 pm, OSN	No. 12	Pepperdine	W 100–70	1–0	McArthur Court (8,601); Eugene, OR
11/11/2007*; 6:00 pm, OSN	No. 12	Pacific	W 80–64	2–0	McArthur Court (8,405); Eugene, OR
11/12/2007*; 7:30 pm, OSN	No. 11	Western Michigan	W 97–88	3–0	McArthur Court (8,341); Eugene, OR
11/17/2007*; 7:00 pm, CSN	No. 11	at Portland	W 85–61	4–0	Chiles Center (4,881); Portland, OR
11/20/2007*; 7:00 pm, ESPNU	No. 12	at St. Mary's	L 87–99	4–1	McKeon Pavilion (3,500); Moraga, CA
11/24/2007*; 7:00 pm	No. 12	San Francisco	W 110–79	5–1	McArthur Court (7,033); Eugene, OR
11/29/2007*; 6:00 pm, ESPN2	No. 17	at No. 25 Kansas State	W 80–77 ^{OT}	6–1	Bramlage Coliseum (12,528); Manhattan, KS
12/08/2007*; 3:00 pm, OSN	No. 19	Utah	W 75–64	7–1	Rose Garden (11,447); Portland, OR
12/11/2007*; 7:00 pm	No. 16	Sacramento State	W 93–66	8–1	McArthur Court (8,125); Eugene, OR
12/15/2007*; 11:00 am, OSN	No. 16	at Nebraska	L 79–88 ^{OT}	8–2	Bob Devaney Sports Center (12,109); Omaha, NE
12/22/2007*; 6:00 pm, ESPNU	No. 23	vs. Oakland	L 62–68	8–3	The Palace of Auburn Hills (22,076); Auburn Hills, MI
12/28/2007*; 7:00 pm		Mount St. Mary's	W 81–73	9–3	McArthur Court (8,916); Eugene, OR
01/03/2008; 6:00 pm		at Arizona State	L 54–62	9–4	Wells Fargo Arena (7,690); Tempe, AZ
01/05/2008; 11:00 am, FSN		at No. 21 Arizona	W 84–74	10–4	McKale Center (14,575); Tucson, AZ
01/10/2008; 6:00 pm, OSN		California	W 79–70	11–4	McArthur Court (8,817); Eugene, OR
01/13/2008; 1:30 pm, CBS		No. 23 Stanford	W 71–66	12–4	McArthur Court (9,087); Eugene, OR
01/17/2008; 6:00 pm, OSN/FSN		at Washington	L 70–78	12–5	Bank of America Arena (9,628); Seattle, WA
01/20/2008; 5:00 pm, FSN		at No. 8 Washington State	L 60–69	12–6	Beasley Coliseum (11,120); Pullman, WA
01/24/2008; 7:30 pm, FSN		No. 8 UCLA	L 75–80	12–7	McArthur Court (9,087); Eugene, OR
01/26/2008; 6:00 pm, FSN		USC	L 86–95 ^{OT}	12–8	McArthur Court (9,087); Eugene, OR
02/02/2008; 3:00 pm, OSN		Oregon State; Civil War	W 79–63	13–8	McArthur Court (9,087); Eugene, OR
02/07/2008; 7:00 pm		at No. 9 Stanford	L 43–72	13–9	Maples Pavilion (7,329); Stanford, CA
02/09/2008; 4:00 pm, OSN		at California	W 92–70	14–9	Haas Pavilion (10,407); Berkeley, CA
02/14/2008; 5:30 pm, OSN		Washington	W 71–58	15–9	McArthur Court (8,866); Eugene, OR
02/16/2008; 6:00 pm, FSN		No. 21 Washington State	L 53–62	15–10	McArthur Court (9,087); Eugene, OR
02/21/2008; 8:00 pm, FSN		at USC	L 75–81	15–11	Galen Center (8,721); Los Angeles
02/23/2008; 12:30 pm, ABC		at No. 6 UCLA	L 65–75	15–12	Pauley Pavilion (11,355); Los Angeles
03/02/2008; 7:00 pm, FSN		at Oregon State; Civil War	W 80–68	16–12	Gill Coliseum (7,031); Corvallis, OR
03/06/2008; 6:00 pm, OSN		Arizona State	W 67–61	17–12	McArthur Court (8,895); Eugene, OR
03/08/2008; 7:30 pm, FSN		Arizona	W 78–69	18–12	McArthur Court (9,087); Eugene, OR
Pac-10 tournament
03/13/2008; 6:00 pm, FSN	(6)	vs. (3) No. 21 Washington State; Pac-10 Conference tournament quarterfinal	L 70–75	18–13	Staples Center (N/A); Los Angeles
NCAA tournament
03/21/2008*; 07:25 pm, CBS	(9 S)	vs. (8 S) Mississippi State; NCAA tournament first round	L 69–76	18–14	Alltel Arena (16,060); Little Rock, AR
*Non-conference game. ^{#}Rankings from AP Poll. (#) Tournament seedings in parentheses. All times are in Pacific Time.

== Roster ==
=== Centers ===
- 3 Mitch Platt – Senior – Henderson, Nev.
- 45 Ray Schafer – Senior – Wasilla, Alaska

=== Forwards ===
- 10 Maarty Leunen – Senior – Redmond, Ore.
- 11 Frantz Dorsainvil – Junior – Montreal, Quebec
- 33 Drew Viney – Freshman – Villa Park, Calif.
- 50 Joevan Catron – Sophomore – Phoenix, Ill.

=== Guards ===
- 1 Malik Hairston – Senior – Detroit, Mich.
- 4 Bryce Taylor – Senior – Encino, Calif.
- 4 Ben Voogd – Junior – Florence, Ore.
- 12 Tajuan Porter – Sophomore – Detroit, Mich.
- 13 Churchill Odia – Junior – Lagos, Nigeria
- 15 John Elorriaga – Freshman – Portland, Ore.
- 21 Nicholas Fearn – Freshman – Seattle, Wash.
- 24 LeKendric Longmire – Freshman – Pascagoula, Miss.
- 34 Kamyron Brown – Freshman – Santa Ana, Calif.

== Coaching staff ==
- Ernie Kent – Head Coach
- Mark Hudson – Assistant Coach
- Kenny Payne – Assistant Coach
- Yasir Rosemond – Assistant Coach
- Josh Jamieson – Director of Basketball Operations
- Clay Jamieson – Athletic Trainer
- Nathan Bain – Manager
- H.J. Cohn – Student Manager
- David Flasch – Manager
- Shawn Harriett – Manager
- Josh Suh – Manager

== Season Notes ==
=== Awards ===
- Malik Hairston
  - Named as one of the John R. Wooden Award's pre-season top 50 candidates.

=== Records ===
- On December 3, the Oregon Ducks men's basketball team set the school record for most consecutive weeks ranked in the AP Poll as a Top-25 team. Oregon had been ranked by the AP since December 11, 2006, which was a total of 19 polls released with the Ducks in the Top-25. The previous record was 18 weeks, set between February 4, 2002, and January 27, 2003.

== Game notes ==
Pepperdine @ Oregon

	1	2	Total
Waves	23	47	70
Ducks	53	47	100

Game Leaders
	Pepperdine	Oregon
Scoring	Malcolm Thomas: 22 Points	Malik Hariston: 17 Points
Rebounds	Malcolm Thomas: 8 Rebounds	Maarty Leunen: 14 Rebounds
Assists	Rico Tucker: 5 Assists	Tajuan Porter: 9 Assists
Steals	Tyrone Shelley: 3 Steals	Bryce Taylor: 3 Steals
Blocks	Malcolm Thomas: 2 Blocks	Maarty Leunen: 3 Blocks

Pacific @ Oregon

	1	2	Total
Tigers	27	37	64
Ducks	34	46	80

Game Leaders
	Pacific	Oregon
Scoring	Steffan Johnson: 22 Points	Tajuan Porter: 23 Points
Rebounds	Michael Nunnally: 7 Rebounds	Maarty Leunen: 10 Rebounds
Assists	Steffan Johnson: 5 Assists	Joevan Catron: 3 Assists
Steals	Steffan Johnson: 1 Steals	Kamyron Brown: 2 Steals
Blocks	Michael Nunnally: 2 Blocks	Bryce Taylor: 2 Blocks

Western Michigan @ Oregon

	1	2	Total
Broncos	30	58	88
Ducks	46	51	97

Game Leaders
	Western Michigan	Oregon
Scoring	David Kool: 24 Points	Malik Hariston: 29 Points
Rebounds	Derek Drews: 6 Rebounds	Joevan Catron: 10 Rebounds
Assists	Andre Ricks: 4 Assists	Joevan Catron: 4 Assists
Steals	Andrew Hershberger: 3 Steals	Maarty Leunen: 1 Steals
Blocks	Donald Lawson: 1 Blocks	Malik Hariston: 4 Blocks

Oregon @ Portland

	1	2	Total
Ducks	31	54	85
Pilots	29	32	61

Game Leaders
	Oregon	Portland
Scoring	Malik Hariston: 24 Points	Taishi Ito: 13 Points
Rebounds	Maarty Leunen: 10 Rebounds	Luke Sikma: 10 Rebounds
Assists	Kamyron Brown: 10 Assists	Luke Sikma: 4 Assists
Steals	Tajuan Porter: 2 Steals	Luke Sikma: 3 Steals
Blocks	Joevan Catron: 2 Blocks	Luke Sikma: 2 Blocks

Oregon @ Saint Mary's

	1	2	Total
Ducks	35	52	87
Gaels	38	61	99

Game Leaders
	Oregon	Saint Mary's
Scoring	Kamyron Brown: 20 Points	Patrick Mills: 37 Points
Rebounds	Maarty Leunen: 11 Rebounds	Diamon Simpson: 12 Rebounds
Assists	Maarty Leunen: 2 Assists	Patrick Mills: 5 Assists
Steals	Kamyron Brown: 2 Steals	Patrick Mills: 2 Steals
Blocks	Kamyron Brown: 2 Blocks	Diamon Simpson: 2 Blocks

San Francisco @ Oregon

	1	2	Total
Dons	50	29	79
Ducks	62	48	110

Game Leaders
	San Francisco	Oregon
Scoring	Manny Quezada: 30 Points	Maarty Leunen: 18 Points
Rebounds	Dior Lowhorn: 7 Rebounds	Joevan Catron: 14 Rebounds
Assists	Myron Strong: 7 Assists	Joevan Catron: 4 Assists
Steals	Manny Quezada: 2 Steals	Joevan Catron: 2 Steals
Blocks	Diamon Simpson: 2 Blocks	Kamyron Brown: 2 Blocks

Oregon @ Kansas State

	1	2	OT	Total
Ducks	29	42	9	80
Wildcats	32	39	6	77

Game Leaders
	Oregon	Kansas State
Scoring	Bryce Taylor: 18 Points	Michael Beasley: 24 Points
Rebounds	Maarty Leunen: 13 Rebounds	Michael Beasley: 12 Rebounds
Assists	Tajuan Porter: 5 Assists	Jacob Pullen: 5 Assists
Steals	Malik Hairston: 2 Steals	Jacob Pullen: 3 Steals
Blocks	Malik Hairston: 3 Blocks	Michael Beasley: 3 Blocks

Utah @ Oregon

	1	2	Total
Utes	33	31	64
Ducks	38	37	75

Game Leaders
	Utah	Oregon
Scoring	Tyler Kepkay: 23 Points	Bryce Taylor: 20 Points
Rebounds	Luke Nevill: 5 Rebounds	Joevan Catron: 7 Rebounds
Assists	Tyler Kepkay: 3 Assists	Kamyron Brown: 4 Assists
Steals	Tyler Kepkay: 2 Steals	Maarty Leunen: 3 Steals
Blocks	Luke Nevill: 1 Blocks	Malik Hariston: 1 Blocks

Sacramento @ Oregon

	1	2	Total
Hornets	36	30	66
Ducks	46	47	93

Game Leaders
	Sacramento State	Oregon
Scoring	Loren Leath: 21 Points	Maarty Leunen: 23 Points
Rebounds	Randy Adams: 8 Rebounds	Maarty Leunen: 11 Rebounds
Assists	Vinnie McGhee Jr.: 7 Assists	Kamyron Brown: 6 Assists
Steals	Loren Leath: 2 Steals	Kamyron Brown: 2 Steals
Blocks	Clark Woods: 1 Blocks	Joevan Catron: 1 Blocks

Oregon @ Nebraska

	1	2	OT	Total
Ducks	34	40	5	79
Cornhuskers	38	36	14	88

Game Leaders
	Oregon	Nebraska
Scoring	Tajuan Porter: 29 Points	Aleks Maric: 23 Points
Rebounds	Joevan Catron: 9 Rebounds	Ryan Anderson: 9 Rebounds
Assists	Kamyron Brown: 4 Assists	Jay-R Strowbridge: 5 Assists
Steals	Joevan Catron: 2 Steals	Ryan Anderson: 4 Steals
Blocks	Joevan Catron: 1 Blocks	Aleks Maric: 3 Blocks

Oregon vs. Oakland

	1	2	Total
Ducks	26	36	62
Golden Grizzlies	37	31	68

Game Leaders
	Oregon	Oakland
Scoring	Joevan Catron: 15 Points	Derick Nelson: 22 Points
Rebounds	Maarty Leunen: 12 Rebounds	Derick Nelson: 9 Rebounds
Assists	Maarty Leunen: 5 Assists	Johnathon Jones: 8 Assists
Steals	Maarty Leunen: 1 Steal	Derick Nelson: 2 Steals
Blocks	None	Keith Benson: 2 Blocks

== Stats ==
=== Team ===
	Ore	Opp
Scoring	639	538
Points per game	91.3	76.9
Scoring Margin	+14.4	–
Field goals-Att	229–451	195–471
Field Goal Pct.	.508	.414
3-Point FG-Att	61–144	49–170
3-Point FG pct.	.424	.288
3-Point FG Made per Game	8.7	7.0
Free Throws-Att	120–190	99–143
Free Throw Pct.	.632	.692

	Ore	Opp
Rebounds	294	252
Rebounds per Game	42.0	36.0
Rebounding Margin	+6.0	–
Assists	118	105
Assists per Game	16.9	15.0
Turnovers	92	100
Turnovers per Game	13.1	14.3
Turnover Margin	+1.1	–
Assist-Turnover Ratio	1.3	1.1

	Ore	Opp
Steals	38	42
Steals per Game	5.4	6.0
Blocks	36	24
Blocks per Game	5.1	3.4
Winning Streak	2	–
Home Win Streak	4	–
Attendance	32,380	20,909
Games/Avg per Game	4/8,095	3/6,970

=== Scores by half ===
	1	2	OT	Total
Oregon	1089	1196	26	2311
Opponents	1007	1122	41	2170

=== Individual ===
Name	GP	MIN	FGM	FGA	FTM	FTA	3PM	3PA	PTS	OFF	DEF	TOT	AST	TO	STL	BLK	PF
Malik Hairston	29	911	162	307	91	126	48	110	463	41	95	136	66	50	18	26	81
Maarty Leunen	30	1045	148	259	108	136	57	107	461	64	216	280	88	47	26	11	70
Tajuan Porter	30	967	140	364	53	67	75	213	408	14	56	70	73	69	14	4	66
Joevan Catron	24	637	82	160	56	84	5	13	225	52	92	144	55	50	13	11	73
Bryce Taylor	28	921	130	274	59	73	49	123	368	31	75	106	40	46	20	12	69
Kamyron Brown	28	535	41	102	35	61	8	31	125	2	47	49	93	67	22	3	42
LeKendrick Longmire	26	296	43	79	8	27	3	10	97	21	19	40	4	10	11	5	35
Frantz Dorsainvil	19	153	27	47	8	24	0	0	62	16	17	30	2	16	4	2	29
Mitch Platt	22	169	14	24	4	12	0	0	32	6	16	22	12	10	2	2	15
Churchill Odia	26	347	16	40	0	0	13	35	45	6	30	36	21	7	6	1	37
Drew Viney	10	76	6	17	2	6	4	11	18	3	10	13	2	4	1	2	14
Ray Schafer	6	18	2	4	3	4	0	0	7	2	1	3	0	1	2	0	4
Total	30	6075	811	1677	427	620	262	653	2311	309	722	1031	456	379	139	79	535

Glossary

GP: Games Played, MIN: Minutes, FGM: Field goals made, FGA: Field goals attempted, FTM: Free throws made, FTA: Free throws attempted, 3PM: 3-pointers made, 3PA: 3-pointers attempted, PTS: Points, OFF: Offensive rebounds, DEF: Defensive rebounds, REB: Rebounds, TOT: Total rebounds AST: Assists, TO: Turnovers, STL: Steals, BLK: Blocks, PF: Personal fouls
