= 2007–08 Washington State Cougars men's basketball team =

American college basketball season

2007–08 Washington State Cougars men's basketball

NCAA tournament, Sweet Sixteen
- Conference: Pacific-10 Conference

Ranking
- Coaches: No. 15
- AP: No. 21
- Record: 26–9 (11–7 Pac-10)
- Head coach: Tony Bennett (2nd season)
- Assistant coaches: Ben Johnson; Ron Sanchez; Matt Woodley; Mike Heideman
- Home arena: Beasley Coliseum

2007–08 Pacific-10 Conference men's basketball standings
| | Conf. | | | | Overall |
| Team | W | | L | PCT | W | | L | PCT |
|---|---|---|---|---|---|---|---|---|
| No. 2 UCLA† | 16 | – | 2 | .889 | 35 | – | 4 | .897 |
| No. 11 Stanford | 13 | – | 5 | .722 | 28 | – | 8 | .778 |
| No. 21 Washington State | 11 | – | 7 | .611 | 26 | – | 9 | .743 |
| Arizona State | 9 | – | 9 | .500 | 21 | – | 13 | .618 |
| Oregon | 9 | – | 9 | .500 | 18 | – | 14 | .563 |
| Arizona | 8 | – | 10 | .444 | 19 | – | 15 | .559 |
| Washington | 7 | – | 11 | .389 | 16 | – | 17 | .485 |
| California | 6 | – | 12 | .333 | 17 | – | 16 | .515 |
| Oregon State | 0 | – | 18 | .000 | 6 | – | 25 | .194 |
| USC* | 0 | – | 7 | .000 | 0 | – | 12 | .000 |
† Conference tournament winner As of April 5, 2008; Rankings from AP Poll; *USC vacated 11 conference and 21 overall wins, due to NCAA rules violations.

The 2007–08 Washington State Cougars men's basketball team represented Washington State University for the 2007–08 NCAA Division I men's basketball season. The head coach was Tony Bennett. The team played its home games on Jack Friel Court in Beasley Coliseum in Pullman, Washington. The Cougars received an at-large bid to the NCAA tournament, where they lost to North Carolina in the Sweet Sixteen.

== Roster ==
| Name | Number | Position | Height | Weight | Year | Hometown |
|---|---|---|---|---|---|---|
| Thomas Abercrombie | 20 | Guard | 6–6 | 191 | Redshirt Freshman | Auckland, New Zealand |
| Aron Baynes | 11 | Center | 6–10 | 270 | Junior | Cairns, Australia |
| Fabian Boeke | 13 | Forward | 6–11 | 230 | Freshman | Kummerfeld, Germany |
| Robbie Cowgill | 34 | Forward | 6–10 | 211 | Senior | Austin, Texas |
| Jeremy Cross | 21 | Guard | 6–2 | 207 | Redshirt Senior | Vista, California |
| Charlie Enquist | 40 | Forward | 6–8 | 204 | Freshman | Edmonds, Washington |
| Caleb Forrest | 52 | Forward | 6–8 | 228 | Junior | Pagosa Springs, Colorado |
| Daven Harmeling | 32 | Forward | 6–7 | 216 | Redshirt Junior | Grand Junction, Colorado |
| Chris Henry | 42 | Center | 6–9 | 266 | Senior | Santa Ana, California |
| Nikola Koprivica | 4 | Guard | 6–6 | 211 | Sophomore | Belgrade, Serbia |
| Abe Lodwick | 5 | Guard | 6–7 | 180 | Freshman | Bend, Oregon |
| Derrick Low | 2 | Guard | 6–2 | 196 | Senior | Honolulu, Hawaii |
| Taylor Rochestie | 10 | Guard | 6–1 | 186 | Redshirt Junior | Santa Barbara, California |
| Stephen Sauls | 1 | Guard | 6–3 | 195 | Freshman | Missouri City, Texas |
| Kyle Weaver | 25 | Guard | 6–6 | 201 | Senior | Beloit, Wisconsin |

== Schedule ==
| Date time, TV | Rank^{#} | Opponent^{#} | Result | Record | Site (attendance) city, state |
Exhibition
| November 4, 2007*; 4:00 p.m. | No. 10 | Lewis–Clark State | W 80–42 | – | Beasley Coliseum (4,321); Pullman, WA |
Regular Season
| November 9, 2007*; 6:35 p.m., FSN-NW | No. 10 | Eastern Washington | W 68–41 | 1–0 | Beasley Coliseum (10,215); Pullman, WA |
| November 13, 2007*; 6:00 p.m. | No. 9 | at Boise State | W 86–74 | 2–0 | Taco Bell Arena (6,718); Boise, ID |
| November 16, 2007*; 7:00 p.m. | No. 9 | Idaho; Battle of the Palouse | W 74–43 | 3–0 | Beasley Coliseum (8,116); Pullman, WA |
| November 23, 2007*; 7:30 p.m. | No. 9 | vs. Montana; Cougar Hispanic College Fund Challenge | W 66–55 | 4–0 | Spokane Arena (5,524); Spokane, WA |
| November 24, 2007*; 12:00 p.m. | No. 9 | vs. Mississippi Valley State; Cougar Hispanic College Fund Challenge | W 71–26 | 5–0 | Spokane Arena (N/A); Spokane, WA |
| November 25, 2007*; 2:30 p.m. | No. 9 | vs. Air Force; Cougar Hispanic College Fund Challenge | W 71–62 | 6–0 | Spokane Arena (3,585); Spokane, WA |
| November 30, 2007*; 6:00 p.m., ESPNU | No. 6 | at Baylor; Big 12/Pac-10 Hardwood Series | W 67–64 | 7–0 | Ferrell Center (10,193); Waco, TX |
| December 5, 2007*; 8:00 p.m., ESPNU | No. 6 | at No. 19 Gonzaga | W 51–47 | 8–0 | McCarthey Athletic Center (6,000); Spokane, WA |
| December 9, 2007*; 5:30 p.m. | No. 6 | Portland State | W 72–60 | 9–0 | Beasley Coliseum (7,048); Pullman, WA |
| December 20, 2007*; 7:30 p.m., FSN-NW | No. 6 | vs. The Citadel; 2007 Cougar Hardwood Classic | W 67–45 | 10–0 | KeyArena (12,471); Seattle, WA |
| December 23, 2007*; 1:05 p.m. | No. 6 | at Idaho State | W 75–45 | 11–0 | Holt Arena (2,241); Pocatello, ID |
| December 28, 2007*; 7:00 p.m. | No. 4 | North Carolina A&T | W 67–34 | 12–0 | Beasley Coliseum (6,642); Pullman, WA |
| January 5, 2008; 7:00 p.m., FSN-NW | No. 4 | at Washington; Rivalry | W 56–52 | 13–0 (1–0) | Bank of America Arena (10,000); Seattle, WA |
| January 10, 2008; 8:00 p.m., FSN | No. 4 | at USC | W 73–58 | 14–0 (2–0) | Galen Center (10,027); Los Angeles |
| January 12, 2008; 11:30 a.m., FSN | No. 4 | at No. 5 UCLA | L 74–81 | 14–1 (2–1) | Pauley Pavilion (12,590); Los Angeles |
| January 17, 2008; 7:00 p.m. | No. 8 | Oregon State | W 69–46 | 15–1 (3–1) | Beasley Coliseum (10,117); Pullman, WA |
| January 20, 2008; 5:00 p.m., FSN | No. 8 | Oregon | W 69–60 | 16–1 (4–1) | Beasley Coliseum (11,120); Pullman, WA |
| January 24, 2008; 5:30 p.m., FSN-NW | No. 6 | at Arizona | L 64-76 | 16–2 (4–2) | McKale Center (14,598); Tucson, AZ |
| January 26, 2008; 4:00 p.m., FSN-NW | No. 6 | at No. 24 Arizona State | W 56–55 | 17–2 (5–2) | Wells Fargo Arena (10,104); Tempe, AZ |
| January 31, 2008; 7:00 p.m. | No. 9 | California | L 64-69 | 17–3 (5–3) | Beasley Coliseum (8,810); Pullman, WA |
| February 2, 2008; 12:00 p.m., FSN | No. 9 | No. 14 Stanford | L 65–67 ^{OT} | 17–4 (5–4) | Beasley Coliseum (9,202); Pullman, WA |
| February 7, 2008; 7:30 p.m., FSN | No. 17 | No. 4 UCLA | L 59-67 | 17–5 (5–5) | Beasley Coliseum (9,547); Pullman, WA |
| February 9, 2008; 12:30 p.m., ABC | No. 17 | USC | W 74–50 | 18–5 (6–5) | Beasley Coliseum (9,136); Pullman, WA |
| February 14, 2008; 5:30 p.m., FSN-NW | No. 20 | at Oregon State | W 70–57 | 19–5 (7–5) | Gill Coliseum (5,321); Corvallis, OR |
| February 16, 2008; 6:00 p.m., FSN | No. 20 | at Oregon | W 62–53 | 20–5 (8–5) | McArthur Court (9,087); Eugene, OR |
| February 21, 2008; 6:00 p.m., FSN-NW | No. 19 | Arizona State | W 59–47 | 21–5 (9–5) | Beasley Coliseum (9,212); Pullman, WA |
| February 23, 2008; 7:00 p.m., FSN | No. 19 | Arizona | L 55-65 | 21–6 (9–6) | Beasley Coliseum (10,288); Pullman, WA |
| February 28, 2008; 8:00 p.m., FSN | No. 22 | at California | W 70–49 | 22–6 (10–6) | Haas Pavilion (8,282); Berkeley, CA |
| March 1, 2008; 1:00 p.m., FSN | No. 22 | at No. 8 Stanford | L 53-60 | 22–7 (10–7) | Maples Pavilion (7,329); Palo Alto, CA |
| March 8, 2008; 4:30 p.m., FSN-NW | No. 22 | Washington; Rivalry | W 76–73 ^{2OT} | 23–7 (11–7) | Beasley Coliseum (10,630); Pullman, WA |
Pac-10 tournament
| March 13, 2008; 6:00 p.m., FSN | No. 21 | vs. Oregon; Quarterfinals | W 75–70 | 24–7 | Staples Center (16,442); Los Angeles |
| March 14, 2008; 8:30 p.m., FSN | No. 21 | vs. No. 11 Stanford; Semifinals | L 68–75 | 24–8 | Staples Center (18,997); Los Angeles |
NCAA tournament
| March 20, 2008*; 4:20 p.m., CBS | No. 21 | vs. Winthrop; First Round | W 71–40 | 25–8 | Pepsi Center (19,282); Denver, CO |
| March 22, 2008*; 3:40 p.m., CBS | No. 21 | vs. No. 15 Notre Dame; Second Round | W 61–41 | 26–8 | Pepsi Center (19,299); Denver, CO |
| March 27, 2008*; 4:27 p.m., CBS | No. 21 | vs. No. 1 North Carolina; Sweet Sixteen | L 47–68 | 26–9 | Charlotte Bobcats Arena (19,092); Charlotte, NC |
*Non-conference game. ^{#}Rankings from Coaches' Poll. (#) Tournament seedings in parentheses. All times are in Pacific Time.
