= 2007–08 Stanford Cardinal men's basketball team =

American college basketball season

2007–2008 Stanford Cardinal men's basketball

NCAA tournament, Sweet Sixteen
- Conference: Pac-10 Conference

Ranking
- Coaches: No. 11
- AP: No. 10
- Record: 28–8 (13–5 Pac-10)
- Head coach: Trent Johnson (4th season)
- Assistant coaches: Doug Oliver; Donny Guerinoni; Nick Robinson
- Home arena: Maples Pavilion

2007–08 Pacific-10 Conference men's basketball standings
	Conf.				Overall
Team	W		L	PCT	W		L	PCT
No. 2 UCLA†	16	–	2	.889	35	–	4	.897
No. 11 Stanford	13	–	5	.722	28	–	8	.778
No. 21 Washington State	11	–	7	.611	26	–	9	.743
Arizona State	9	–	9	.500	21	–	13	.618
Oregon	9	–	9	.500	18	–	14	.563
Arizona	8	–	10	.444	19	–	15	.559
Washington	7	–	11	.389	16	–	17	.485
California	6	–	12	.333	17	–	16	.515
Oregon State	0	–	18	.000	6	–	25	.194
USC*	0	–	7	.000	0	–	12	.000
† Conference tournament winner As of April 5, 2008; Rankings from AP Poll; *USC vacated 11 conference and 21 overall wins, due to NCAA rules violations.

The 2007–08 Stanford Cardinal men's basketball team represented Stanford University during the 2007–08 NCAA Division I men's basketball season. The Cardinal were led by fourth-year head coach Trent Johnson, and played their home games at Maples Pavilion as a member of the Pacific-10 Conference. After the season ended, Trent Johnson left Stanford and accepted a job at LSU.

== Previous season ==
The Cardinal started the season by winning eight of their first ten games. After a small stumble against #7 Arizona and in-state rival California, the Cardinal followed it up with seven straight wins, four of which were against ranked teams. Following those four wins against ranked teams, they began the next week in the top 25 for the first time under Trent Johnson. While being ranked, Stanford would lose three of their next four, and fall out of the top 25. They ended the regular season going 3–3 in the final six games.

Stanford finished conference play in sixth place and played third seed USC in the Pac-10 Conference tournament. The Cardinal lost in overtime 83–79. They gained an at-large bid to the 2007 NCAA tournament placed in the South Region as the #11 seed, and played #6 seed Louisville. The Cardinals beat the Cardinal 78–58, ending the Cardinal season at 18–13 overall and 10–8 in conference play.

== Offseason ==
=== Departures ===
Name	Pos.	Height	Weight	Year	Hometown	Reason for departure
Carlton Weatherby	G	6'1"	180	RS senior	Tacoma, WA	Graduated
Chris Bobel	G	6'2"	195	Senior	Palo Alto, CA	Graduated

=== Incoming ===
College recruiting
Name	Hometown	School	Height	Weight	Commit date
Josh Owens; F	Kennesaw, GA	Phillips Exeter Academy	6 ft 7 in (2.01 m)	210 lb (95 kg)	
Josh Owens; F	Recruit ratings: (80)				
Overall recruit ranking:
Note: In many cases, Scout, Rivals, 247Sports, On3, and ESPN may conflict in their listings of height and weight.; In these cases, the average was taken. ESPN grades are on a 100-point scale.; Sources: "Stanford Commit List for 2007". Rivals.; "2007 Team Ranking". Rivals.

== Roster ==
2007–08 Stanford Cardinal men's basketball team
Players
Coaches

Pos.	#	Name	Height	Weight	Year	Previous school	Hometown
G	1	Mitch Johnson	6 ft 1 in (1.85 m)	185 lb (84 kg)	Jr	O'Dea High School	Seattle, WA
G	2	Landry Fields	6 ft 5 in (1.96 m)	185 lb (84 kg)	So	Los Alamitos High School	Los Alamitos, CA
G	4	Anthony Goods	6 ft 3 in (1.91 m)	195 lb (88 kg)	Jr	Centennial High School	Corona, CA
F	11	Brook Lopez	7 ft 0 in (2.13 m)	240 lb (109 kg)	So	San Joaquin Memorial	Fresno, CA
G	13	Drew Shiller	6 ft 0 in (1.83 m)	185 lb (84 kg)	RS So	Burlingame High School; San Francisco	Burlingame, CA
F	15	Lawrence Hill	6 ft 8 in (2.03 m)	205 lb (93 kg)	Jr	Deer Valley High School	Glendale, AZ
G	22	Kenny Brown	6 ft 1 in (1.85 m)	190 lb (86 kg)	RS Jr	Carroll Senior High School	Southlake, TX
F	24	Josh Owens	6 ft 8 in (2.03 m)	215 lb (98 kg)	Fr	Phillips Exeter Academy	Kennesaw, GA
F	31	Taj Finger	6 ft 8 in (2.03 m)	190 lb (86 kg)	Sr	Fox Lane High School	Mt. Kisco, NY
G	32	Da'veed Dildy (redshirt)	6 ft 5 in (1.96 m)	185 lb (84 kg)	So	King College Prep	Chicago, IL
F	34	Will Paul	6 ft 9 in (2.06 m)	220 lb (100 kg)	So	Calallen High School	Corpus Christi, TX
C	42	Robin Lopez	7 ft 0 in (2.13 m)	245 lb (111 kg)	So	San Joaquin Memorial	Fresno, CA
F	44	Fred Washington	6 ft 5 in (1.96 m)	205 lb (93 kg)	Sr	Bishop Montgomery High School	Los Angeles, CA
C	55	Peter Prowitt	6 ft 10 in (2.08 m)	250 lb (113 kg)	Sr	The Potomac School	Arlington, VA

Head coach

- Trent Johnson (Boise State)

Assistant coach(es)

- Doug Oliver (San José State)
- Donny Guerinoni (Nevada)
- Nick Robinson (Stanford)

Legend

- (C) Team captain
- (S) Suspended
- (I) Ineligible
- (W) Walk-on
- Injured
- Current redshirt

Roster
Last update: May 13, 2022

== Schedule and results ==
Date time, TV	Rank^{#}	Opponent^{#}	Result	Record	Site (attendance) city, state
Exhibition
August 22, 2007*		at Veroli; Italy Tour	W 103–52	–	Palla Coccia; Rome, Italy
August 24, 2007*		at Stella Marine; Italy Tour	W 99–44	–	Ostia, Italy
August 25, 2007*		at Sutor Basket Montegranaro; Italy Tour	L 79–93	–	Palaport Salicone (250); Norcia, Italy
August 27, 2007*		at Robeuz et Fidres; Italy Tour	W 80–68	–	Varese, Italy
August 28, 2007*		at Pallacanestro Biella; Italy Tour	L 58–72	–	Vigliano Biellese, Italy
August 29, 2007*		at Pallacanestro Varese; Italy Tour	L 68–69	–	(2,500); Varese, Italy
August 30, 2007*		at A.S. Junior Pallacanestro Casale; Italy Tour	W 82–77	–	(400); Valenza, Italy
November 5, 2007*; 7:00 PM	No. 23	Concordia	W 82–70	–	Maples Pavilion; Stanford, CA
December 16, 2007*; 7:00 PM		College of Idaho	W 81–53	–	Maples Pavilion; Stanford, CA
Regular season
November 9, 2007*; 7:00 PM	No. 23	Harvard; Basketball Travelers Classic	W 111–56	1-0	Maples Pavilion (7,329); Stanford, CA
November 10, 2007*; 7:00 PM	No. 23	Northwestern State; Basketball Travelers Classic	W 97–58	2-0	Maples Pavilion (7,329); Stanford, CA
November 11, 2007*; 3:00 PM	No. 23	UC Santa Barbara; Basketball Travelers Classic	W 67–48	3-0	Maples Pavilion (7,329); Stanford, CA
November 15, 2007*; 6:00 PM	No. 20	at Northwestern	W 71–60	4-0	Welsh–Ryan Arena (3,854); Evanston, IL
November 17, 2007*; 10:00 AM	No. 20	at Siena	L 67–79	4-1	Times Union Center (6,274); Albany, NY
November 20, 2007*; 7:00 PM		Yale	W 72–61	5-1	Maples Pavilion (7,322); Stanford, CA
November 24, 2007*; 8:00 PM		Colorado State	W 73–53	6-1	Maples Pavilion (7,339); Stanford, CA
November 27, 2007*; 7:00 PM		Sacramento State	W 84–58	7-1	Maples Pavilion (7,329); Stanford, CA
December 2, 2007*; 1:00 PM		at Colorado	W 67–43	8-1	Coors Events Conference Center (6,175); Boulder, CO
December 19, 2007*; 7:30 PM		Santa Clara	W 74–48	9-1	Maples Pavilion (7,354); Stanford, CA
December 22. 2007*; 1:30 PM		vs. Texas Tech	W 62–61	10-1	(7,119); Dallas, TX
December 29, 2007*; 2:00 PM		Fresno State	W 55–48	11-1	Maples Pavilion (7,329); Stanford, CA
Pac-10 Conference
January 3, 2008; 7:20 PM	No. 24	No. 5 UCLA	L 67–76	11-2 (0–1)	Maples Pavilion (7,329); Stanford, CA
January 5, 2008; 5:00 PM	No. 24	No. 22 USC	W 52–46	12-2 (1–1)	Maples Pavilion (7,329); Stanford, CA
January 10, 2008; 6:00 PM	No. 23	at Oregon State	W 66–46	13-2 (2–1)	Gill Coliseum (4,017); Corvallis, OR
January 13, 2008; 1:30 PM	No. 23	at Oregon	L 66–71	13-3 (2–2)	McArthur Court (9,087); Eugene, OR
January 17, 2008; 8:00 PM		Arizona	W 56–52	14-3 (3–2)	Maples Pavilion (7,329); Stanford, CA
January 19, 2008; 7:00 PM		Arizona State	W 67–52	15-3 (4–2)	Maples Pavilion (7,329); Stanford, CA
January 26, 2008; 4:00 PM	No. 20	at California	W 82–77	16-3 (5–2)	Haas Pavilion (10,077); Berkeley, CA
January 31, 2008; 7:00 PM	No. 14	at Washington	W 65–51	17-3 (6–2)	Bank of America Arena (9,373); Seattle, WA
February 2, 2008; 12:00 PM	No. 14	at No. 9 Washington State	W 67–65 ^{OT}	18-3 (7–2)	Beasley Coliseum (9,202); Pullman, WA
February 7, 2008; 7:00 PM	No. 9	Oregon	W 72–43	19-3 (8–2)	Maples Pavilion (7,329); Stanford, CA
February 9, 2008; 5:00 PM	No. 9	Oregon State	W 71–56	20-3 (9–2)	Maples Pavilion (7,329); Stanford, CA
February 14, 2008; 7:30 PM	No. 7	at Arizona State	L 68–72 ^{OT}	20-4 (9–3)	Wells Fargo Arena (7,566); Tempe, AZ
February 16, 2008; 12:30 PM	No. 7	at Arizona	W 67–66	21-4 (10–3)	McKale Center (14,589); Tucson, AZ
February 24, 2008; 6:00 PM	No. 9	California	W 79–69	22-4 (11–3)	Maples Pavilion (7,329); Stanford, CA
February 28, 2008; 7:00 PM	No. 8	Washington	W 82–79	23-4 (12–3)	Maples Pavilion (7,329); Stanford, CA
March 1, 2008; 1:00 PM	No. 8	No. 22 Washington State	W 60–53	24-4 (13–3)	Maples Pavilion (7,329); Stanford, CA
March 6, 2008; 8:00 PM	No. 7	at No. 3 UCLA	L 67–77 ^{OT}	24-5 (13–4)	Pauley Pavilion (12,671); Los Angeles, CA
March 8, 2008; 11:00 AM	No. 7	at USC	L 64–77	24-6 (13–5)	Galen Center (9,427); Los Angeles, CA
Pac-10 tournament
March 13, 2008; 8:30 pm	(2) No. 11	vs. (7) Arizona; Quarterfinals	W 75–64	25–6	Staples Center (16,442); Los Angeles, CA
March 14, 2008; 8:30 pm	(2) No. 11	vs. (3) No. 21 Washington State; Semifinals	W 75–68	26–6	Staples Center (18,997); Los Angeles, CA
March 15, 2008; 3:00 pm	(2) No. 11	vs. (1) No. 3 UCLA; Final	L 64–67	26–7	Staples Center (17,534); Los Angeles, CA
NCAA tournament
March 20, 2008*; 1:55 pm, CBS	(3) No. 10	vs. (14) Cornell; First Round	W 77–53	27–7	Honda Center (17,600); Anaheim, CA
March 22, 2008*; 3:45 pm, CBS	(3) No. 10	vs. (6) No. 25 Marquette; Second Round	W 82–81 ^{OT}	28–7	Honda Center (17,600); Anaheim, CA
March 28, 2008*; 3:27 pm, CBS	(3) No. 10	vs. (2) No. 7 Texas; Sweet Sixteen	L 62–82	28–8	Reliant Stadium (32,931); Houston, TX
*Non-conference game. ^{#}Rankings from AP Poll. (#) Tournament seedings in parentheses. S=South. All times are in Pacific Standard Time.

== Rankings ==
Ranking movements Legend: ██ Increase in ranking ██ Decrease in ranking RV = Received votes
	Week																			
Poll	Pre	1	2	3	4	5	6	7	8	9	10	11	12	13	14	15	16	17	18	Final
AP	23	20	RV	RV	RV	RV	RV	RV	24	23	RV	20	14	9	7	9	8	7	10	Not released
Coaches	21	20	RV	RV	RV	RV	25	22	20	23	RV	21	14	9	7	9	8	7	11	11

== 2008 NBA draft ==
Year	Round	Pick	Player	NBA club
2008	1	10	Brook Lopez	New Jersey Nets
2008	1	15	Robin Lopez	Phoenix Suns
