= 2007–08 Washington Huskies men's basketball team =

American college basketball season

2007–08 Washington Huskies men's basketball

CBI, First Round
- Conference: Pacific-10 Conference
- Record: 16–17 (7–11 Pac-10)
- Head coach: Lorenzo Romar
- Assistant coaches: Cameron Dollar; Paul Fortier; Jim Shaw
- Home arena: Bank of America Arena

2007–08 Pacific-10 Conference men's basketball standings
	Conf.				Overall
Team	W		L	PCT	W		L	PCT
No. 2 UCLA†	16	–	2	.889	35	–	4	.897
No. 11 Stanford	13	–	5	.722	28	–	8	.778
No. 21 Washington State	11	–	7	.611	26	–	9	.743
Arizona State	9	–	9	.500	21	–	13	.618
Oregon	9	–	9	.500	18	–	14	.563
Arizona	8	–	10	.444	19	–	15	.559
Washington	7	–	11	.389	16	–	17	.485
California	6	–	12	.333	17	–	16	.515
Oregon State	0	–	18	.000	6	–	25	.194
USC*	0	–	7	.000	0	–	12	.000
† Conference tournament winner As of April 5, 2008; Rankings from AP Poll; *USC vacated 11 conference and 21 overall wins, due to NCAA rules violations.

The 2007–08 Washington Huskies men's basketball team represented the University of Washington in the 2007–08 college basketball season. This was head coach Lorenzo Romar's 6th season at Washington. The Huskies played their home games at Bank of America Arena and were members of the Pacific-10 Conference. They finished the season 16–17, 7–11 in Pac-10 play. They lost in the first round of the 2008 Pacific-10 Conference men's basketball tournament to California. They were invited to the 2008 College Basketball Invitational, where they lost to Valparaiso in the first round.

== 2007–08 Team ==
=== Roster ===
#	Name	Height	Weight (lbs.)	Position	Class	Hometown	Previous team(s)
0	Joel Smith	6'4"	210	G	RS Jr.	Lompoc, CA, U.S.	Brewster Academy
1	Venoy Overton	5'11"	180	G	Fr.	Seattle, WA, U.S.	Franklin HS
4	Tim Morris	6'4"	210	G	Sr.	Spokane Wa, U.S.	Central Valley HS
5	Justin Dentmon	5'11"	185	G	Jr.	Carbondale, IL, U.S.	Winchendon School
11	Matthew Bryan-Amaning	6'9"	235	F	Fr.	London, England, U.K.	South Kent School
20	Ryan Appleby	6'3"	170	G	Sr.	Stanwood, WA, U.S.	Florida
21	Artem Wallace	6'8"	250	C	Jr.	Toledo, WA, U.S.	Toledo HS
22	Justin Holiday	6'6"	170	F	Fr.	Chatsworth, CA, U.S.	Campbell Hall School
24	Quincy Pondexter	6'6"	210	F	So.	Fresno, CA, U.S.	San Joaquin Memorial HS
32	Joe Wolfinger	7'0"	255	C	RS So.	Portland, OR, U.S.	Northfield Mount Hermon School
40	Jon Brockman	6'7"	255	F	Jr.	Snohomish, WA, U.S.	Snohomish Sr. HS
44	Darnell Gant	6'8"	215	F	Fr.	Los Angeles, CA, U.S.	Crenshaw HS

=== Coaching staff ===
Name	Position	Year at Washington	Alma mater (year)
Lorenzo Romar	Head coach	6th	Washington (1980)
Cameron Dollar	Assistant coach	6th	UCLA (1997)
Paul Fortier	Assistant coach	3rd	Washington (2003)
Jim Shaw	Assistant coach	4th	Western Oregon State (1985)
Lance LaVetter	Director of basketball operations	7th	Northern Arizona (1992)

== 2007–08 schedule and results ==
Date time, TV	Rank^{#}	Opponent^{#}	Result	Record	Site (attendance) city, state
Exhibition
11/05/2007*; 7:00 pm		Seattle Pacific	W 86–77	–	Bank of America Arena (8,057); Seattle, WA
Regular season
11/13/2007*; 8:00 pm		New Jersey Tech; NIT Season Tip-Off First Round	W 88–47	1–0	Bank of America Arena (8,655); Seattle, WA
11/14/2007*; 7:45 pm, ESPN2		Utah; NIT Season Tip-Off Quarterfinals	W 83–77	2–0	Bank of America Arena (7,006); Seattle, WA
11/18/2007*; 3:00 pm, FSNNW		Eastern Washington	W 82–68	3–0	Bank of America Arena (7,822); Seattle, WA
11/24/2007*; 4:00 pm, ESPN2		vs. No. 15 Texas A&M; NIT Season Tip-Off Semifinals	L 63–77	3–1	Madison Square Garden (N/A); New York, NY
11/25/2007*; 1:30 pm, ESPNU		vs. No. 21 Syracuse; NIT Season Tip-Off 3rd place game	L 85–91	3–2	Madison Square Garden (N/A); New York, NY
11/26/2007*; 1:00 pm, FSNNW		Long Beach State	W 84–69	4–2	Bank of America Arena (8,847); Seattle, WA
12/01/2007*; 2:30 pm, ESPN		at Oklahoma State; Big 12/Pac-10 Hardwood Series	L 71–96	4–3	Gallagher-Iba Arena (13,172); Stillwater, OK
12/07/2007*; 12:00 pm, FSN		No. 12 Pittsburgh	L 74–75	4–4	Bank of America Arena (9,229); Seattle, WA
12/15/2007*; 3:00 pm, FSNNW		Portland	W 67–63	5–4	Bank of America Arena (9,109); Seattle, WA
12/18/2007*; 7:30 pm, FSNNW		Portland State	W 84–65	6–4	Bank of America Arena (8,989); Seattle, WA
12/22/2007*; 3:00 pm, FSNNW		Cal State Northridge	W 80–66	7–4	Bank of America Arena (9,128); Seattle, WA
12/29/2007*; 12:00 pm, FSNSO		at LSU	W 73–65	8–4	Pete Maravich Assembly Center (8,947); Baton Rouge, LA
12/31/2007*; 3:00 pm, FSNNW		Idaho State	W 82–50	9–4	Bank of America Arena (9,543); Seattle, WA
01/05/2008; 7:00 pm, FSNNW		No. 4 Washington State	L 52–56	9–5 (0–1)	Bank of America Arena (10,000); Seattle, WA
01/10/2008; 7:30 pm, FSNNW		at No. 5 UCLA	L 55–69	9–6 (0–2)	Pauley Pavilion (11,421); Los Angeles, CA
01/12/2008; 3:30 pm		at USC	L 51–66	9–7 (0–3)	Galen Center (9,551); Los Angeles, CA
01/17/2008; 6:00 pm, FSNNW		Oregon	W 78–70	10–7 (1–3)	Bank of America Arena (9,628); Seattle, WA
01/19/2008; 3:00 pm, FSN		Oregon State	W 83–74	11–7 (2–3)	Bank of America Arena (9,421); Seattle, WA
01/24/2008; 6:00 pm		at No. 24 Arizona State	W 72–61	12–7 (3–3)	Wells Fargo Arena (8,995); Tempe, AZ
01/26/2008; 12:00 pm, FSN		at Arizona	L 69–84	12–8 (3–4)	McKale Center (14,602); Tucson, AZ
01/31/2008; 7:00 pm, FSNNW		No. 14 Stanford	L 51–65	12–9 (3–5)	Bank of America Arena (9,373); Seattle, WA
02/02/2008; 3:00 pm, FSNNW		California	L 75–79	12–10 (3–6)	Bank of America Arena (9,404); Seattle, WA
02/07/2008; 7:00 pm		USC	L 59–73	12–11 (3–7)	Bank of America Arena (9,567); Seattle, WA
02/10/2008; 1:30 pm, FSN		No. 5 UCLA	W 71–61	13–11 (4–7)	Bank of America Arena (10,000); Seattle, WA
02/14/2008; 5:30 pm		at Oregon	L 58–71	13–12 (4–8)	McArthur Court (8,866); Eugene, OR
02/16/2008; 4:00 pm, FSNNW		at Oregon State	W 97–59	14–12 (5–8)	Gill Coliseum (5,539); Corvallis, OR
02/21/2009; 8:00 pm, FSNNW		Arizona	W 75–66	15–12 (6–8)	Bank of America Arena (9,529); Seattle, WA
02/23/2008; 3:00 pm, FSN		Arizona State	L 63–77	15–13 (6–9)	Bank of America Arena (9,698); Seattle, WA
02/28/2008; 7:00 pm		at No. 8 Stanford	L 79–82	15–14 (6–10)	Maples Pavilion (7,329); Stanford, CA
03/01/2008; 3:00 pm, FSNNW		at California	W 87–84	16–14 (7–11)	Haas Pavilion (8,640); Berkeley, CA
03/08/2008; 4:30 pm, FSNNW		at No. 23 Washington State	L 73–76	16–15 (7–11)	Beasley Coliseum (10,630); Pullman, WA
2008 Pacific-10 Conference men's basketball tournament
03/12/2008; 6:00 pm, FSN		vs. California; First Round	L 81–84	16–16	Staples Center (N/A); Los Angeles, CA
2008 College Basketball Invitational
03/19/2009*; 6:00 pm, FCS		Valparaiso; First Round	L 71–72	16–17	Bank of America Arena (3,227); Seattle, WA
*Non-conference game. ^{#}Rankings from AP Poll. (#) Tournament seedings in parentheses. All times are in Pacific Time.
