= 2007–08 UCLA Bruins men's basketball team =

American college basketball season

2007–08 UCLA Bruins men's basketball

Pac-10 regular season & tournament champions College Basketball Experience champions

NCAA tournament, Final Four
- Conference: Pacific-10 Conference

Ranking
- Coaches: No. 4
- AP: No. 3
- Record: 35–4 (16–2 Pac-10)
- Head coach: Ben Howland (5th season)
- Assistant coaches: Donny Daniels; Scott Duncan; Scott Garson
- Home arena: Pauley Pavilion

2007–08 Pacific-10 Conference men's basketball standings
	Conf.				Overall
Team	W		L	PCT	W		L	PCT
No. 2 UCLA†	16	–	2	.889	35	–	4	.897
No. 11 Stanford	13	–	5	.722	28	–	8	.778
No. 21 Washington State	11	–	7	.611	26	–	9	.743
Arizona State	9	–	9	.500	21	–	13	.618
Oregon	9	–	9	.500	18	–	14	.563
Arizona	8	–	10	.444	19	–	15	.559
Washington	7	–	11	.389	16	–	17	.485
California	6	–	12	.333	17	–	16	.515
Oregon State	0	–	18	.000	6	–	25	.194
USC*	0	–	7	.000	0	–	12	.000
† Conference tournament winner As of April 5, 2008; Rankings from AP Poll; *USC vacated 11 conference and 21 overall wins, due to NCAA rules violations.

The 2007–08 UCLA Bruins men's basketball team represented the University of California, Los Angeles in the Pacific-10 Conference for the 2007–08 NCAA Division I men's basketball season. In his fifth year as head coach, Ben Howland led the team to its third straight Final Four appearance. The Bruins also set a new record number of wins for the regular season, eclipsing the 26 wins of 2006–07. Though the team was composed of many standout players, freshman center Kevin Love garnered much of the media's and school's attention with his .565 shooting percentage, 10.7 rebounds per game, 5.3 blocks, and 17.6 points per game.

The only losses the Bruins incurred during the regular season were to No. 8 Texas, and Pac-10 rivals USC and Washington, though the USC victory was later vacated upon discovery that USC player O. J. Mayo received illegal benefits while playing for USC. After becoming the Pacific-10 regular season champions and winning the Pacific-10 tournament, the Bruins were seeded No. 1 in the West Regional bracket of the 2008 NCAA Division I men's basketball tournament. In the first round of the NCAA tournament, the Bruins held Mississippi Valley State to 29 points, the lowest total ever allowed in the first or second round of the tournament. After reaching the Final Four for the third year in a row, the Bruins lost to Memphis, the South Regional Champions. On August 20, 2009, Memphis' 38 wins during the 2007–2008 season and Final Four appearances were vacated by the NCAA Committee on Infractions for the team's using an ineligible player, Derrick Rose.

== Recruiting class ==
College recruiting
Name	Hometown	School	Height	Weight	Commit date
Kevin Love; C	Lake Oswego, OR	Lake Oswego HS	6 ft 10 in (2.08 m)	260 lb (120 kg)	Jul 25, 2006
Kevin Love; C	Recruit ratings: Scout: Rivals:				
Chace Stanback; SF	Los Angeles, CA	Fairfax HS	6 ft 8 in (2.03 m)	210 lb (95 kg)	Apr 22, 2006
Chace Stanback; SF	Recruit ratings: Scout: Rivals:				
Overall recruit ranking: Scout: 12 Rivals: 11
Note: In many cases, Scout, Rivals, 247Sports, On3, and ESPN may conflict in their listings of height and weight.; In these cases, the average was taken. ESPN grades are on a 100-point scale.; Sources: "UCLA Commit List for 2007". Rivals.; "Men's Basketball Recruiting". Scout.; "ESPN – UCLA Bruins Basketball Recruiting 2007". ESPN.; "Scout.com Team Recruiting Rankings". Scout.; "2007 Team Ranking". Rivals.

== Roster ==
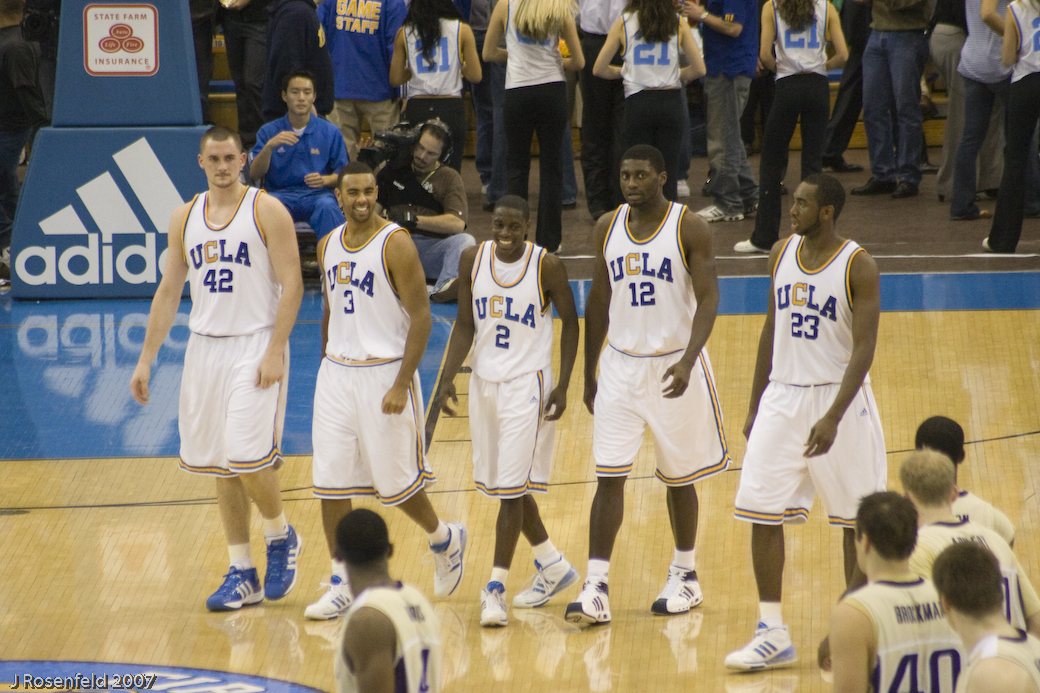
UCLA's starting lineup of (left to right) Love, Shipp, Collison, Aboya, and Mbah a Moute.

2007–08 UCLA Bruins men's basketball team
Players
Coaches

Pos.	#	Name	Height	Weight	Year	Hometown
G	10	Mustafa Abdul-Hamid	6 ft 2 in (1.88 m)	195 lb (88 kg)	So	St. Louis, Missouri
F/C	12	Alfred Aboya	6 ft 8 in (2.03 m)	245 lb (111 kg)	Jr	Yaoundé (Cameroon)
G	2	Darren Collison (C)	6 ft 1 in (1.85 m)	160 lb (73 kg)	Jr	Rancho Cucamonga, California
F	41	Nikola Dragović	6 ft 8 in (2.03 m)	216 lb (98 kg)	So	Belgrade (Serbia)
G	24	Joey Ellis (W)	6 ft 2 in (1.88 m)	185 lb (84 kg)	Jr	Hidden Hills, California
F/C	13	James Keefe	6 ft 8 in (2.03 m)	235 lb (107 kg)	So	Rancho Santa Margarita, California
G	55	Matt Lee (W)	6 ft 0 in (1.83 m)	170 lb (77 kg)	Sr	San Francisco, California
C	42	Kevin Love	6 ft 10 in (2.08 m)	260 lb (118 kg)	Fr	Lake Oswego, Oregon
F/C	14	Lorenzo Mata (C)	6 ft 9 in (2.06 m)	240 lb (109 kg)	Sr	Huntington Park, California
F	23	Luc Richard Mbah a Moute	6 ft 8 in (2.03 m)	230 lb (104 kg)	Jr	Yaoundé (Cameroon)
F	21	David McGrath (W)	6 ft 4 in (1.93 m)	205 lb (93 kg)	Jr	Oxnard, California
G	5	DeAndre Robinson (W)	6 ft 5 in (1.96 m)	210 lb (95 kg)	Jr	Riverside, California
G/F	20	Michael Roll (injured) (redshirt)	6 ft 5 in (1.96 m)	200 lb (91 kg)	Jr	Aliso Viejo, California
F	30	Kevin Schmidt (W)	6 ft 8 in (2.03 m)	220 lb (100 kg)	Fr	San Jose, California
G/F	3	Josh Shipp	6 ft 5 in (1.96 m)	220 lb (100 kg)	Sr	Los Angeles, California
F	22	Chace Stanback	6 ft 8 in (2.03 m)	210 lb (95 kg)	Fr	Los Angeles, California
G	0	Russell Westbrook	6 ft 3 in (1.91 m)	187 lb (85 kg)	So	Hawthorne, California

Head coach

Ben Howland (Weber State)

Assistant coach(es)

- Donny Daniels (Cal State Fullerton)
- Scott Duncan (College of Wooster)
- Scott Garson (UC Santa Barbara)

Legend

- (C) Team captain
- (S) Suspended
- (I) Ineligible
- (W) Walk-on
- Injured
- Current redshirt

Roster

Thirteen scholarships were available to the team, and there were sixteen players on the roster. Kevin Love received permission from Walt Hazzard to wear the No. 42 he wore as player for UCLA. Hazzard's jersey had been retired by UCLA in 1996.

== Schedule ==
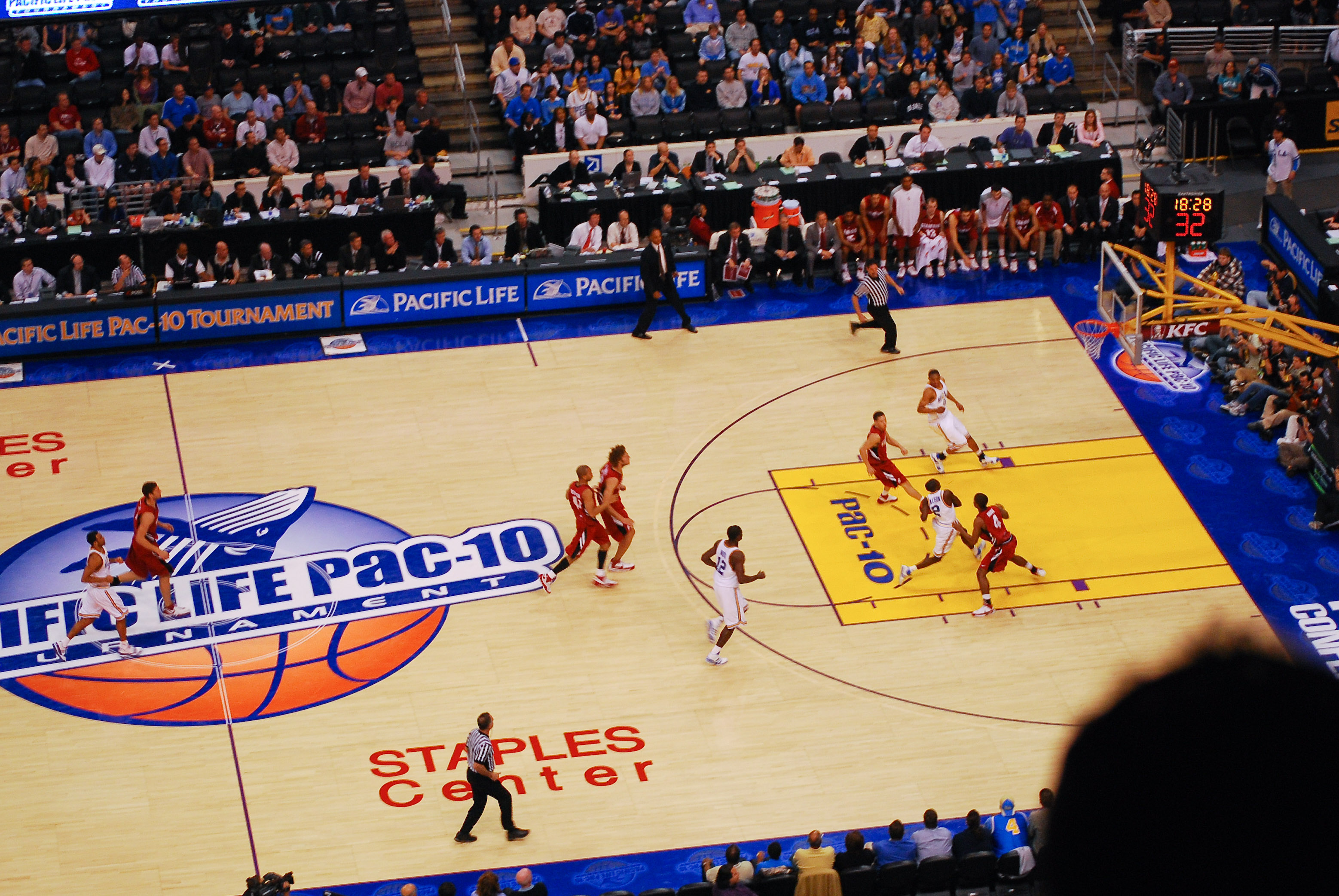
Collison at the 2008 Pac-10 Championship game

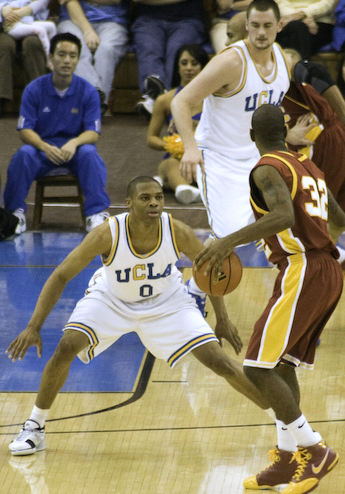
Russell Westbrook in a game against USC

Date time, TV	Rank^{#}	Opponent^{#}	Result	Record	Site city, state
Non-Conference Season
November 2, 2007	No. 2	Azusa Pacific	W 111–61	0–0	Pauley Pavilion; Los Angeles, CA
November 5, 2007	No. 2	Chico State	W 93–55	0–0	Pauley Pavilion; Los Angeles, CA
Non-Conference Season
November 9, 2007*	No. 2	Portland State	W 69–48	1–0	Pauley Pavilion (9,854); Los Angeles, CA
November 12, 2007*; ESPN2	No. 2	Youngstown State; College Basketball Experience Classic	W 83–52	2–0	Pauley Pavilion (7,695); Los Angeles, CA
November 13, 2007*; ESPN2	No. 2	Cal State San Bernardino; College Basketball Experience Classic	W 76–41	3–0	Pauley Pavilion (7,293); Los Angeles, CA
November 19, 2007*; ESPN2	No. 2	vs. Maryland; College Basketball Experience Classic	W 71–59	4–0	Sprint Center (18,022); Kansas City, MO
November 20, 2007*; ESPN2	No. 2	vs. No. 10 Michigan State; College Basketball Experience Classic	W 68–63	5–0	Sprint Center (16,737); Kansas City, MO
November 23, 2007*	No. 2	Yale	W 81–47	6–0	Pauley Pavilion (10,420); Los Angeles, CA
November 28, 2007; FSN PT	No. 1	George Washington	W 83–60	7–0	Pauley Pavilion (9,691); Los Angeles, CA
December 2, 2007*; FSN	No. 2	No. 8 Texas; Big 12/Pac-10 Hardwood Series	L 61–63	7–1	Pauley Pavilion (12,048); Los Angeles, CA
December 8, 2007*; KCAL	No. 8	vs. Davidson; John R. Wooden Classic	W 75–63	8–1	Honda Center (17,440); Anaheim, CA
December 15, 2007*; FSN West	No. 8	Idaho State	W 89–49	9–1	Pauley Pavilion (9,733); Los Angeles, CA
December 18, 2007*	No. 8	Western Illinois	W 77–52	10–1	Pauley Pavilion (8,189); Los Angeles, CA
December 22, 2007*; CBS	No. 8	at Michigan	W 69–54	11–1	Crisler Arena (13,069); Ann Arbor, MI
December 29, 2007*; FSN PT	No. 5	UC Davis	W 76–48	12–1	Pauley Pavilion (10,242); Los Angeles, CA
Conference Season
January 3, 2008; FSN	No. 5	at No. 20 Stanford	W 76–67	13–1 (1–0)	Maples Pavilion (7,329); Stanford, CA
January 5, 2008; FSN	No. 5	at California	W 70–58	14–1 (2–0)	Haas Pavilion (11,877); Berkeley, CA
January 10, 2008; FSN PT	No. 5	Washington	W 69–55	15–1 (3–0)	Pauley Pavilion (11,421); Los Angeles, CA
January 12, 2008; FSN	No. 5	No. 4 Washington State	W 81–74	16–1 (4–0)	Pauley Pavilion (12,590); Los Angeles, CA
January 19, 2008; CBS	No. 4	USC	L 63-72 (Note: USC vacated 21 wins from the 2007–08)	16–2 (4–1)	Pauley Pavilion (12,714); Los Angeles, CA
January 24, 2008; FSN	No. 7	at Oregon	W 80-75	17–2 (5–1)	McArthur Court (9,087); Eugene, OR
January 26, 2008; FSN West	No. 7	at Oregon State	W 85–62	18–2 (6–1)	Gill Coliseum (8,235); Corvallis, OR
January 31, 2008; FSN PT	No. 5	Arizona State	W 84–51	19–2 (7–1)	Pauley Pavilion (11,070); Los Angeles, CA
February 2, 2008; ESPN	No. 5	Arizona; ESPN College GameDay	W 82–60	20–2 (8–1)	Pauley Pavilion (12,111); Los Angeles, CA
February 7, 2008; FSN	No. 4	at No. 17 Washington State	W 67–59	21–2 (9–1)	Beasley Coliseum (9,547); Pullman, WA
February 10, 2008; FSN	No. 4	at Washington	L 61–71	21–3 (9–2)	Bank of America Arena (10,000); Seattle, WA
February 17, 2008; FSN	No. 6	at USC	W 56–46	22–3 (10–2)	Galen Center (10,258); Los Angeles, CA
February 21, 2008; FSN West	No. 6	Oregon State	W 84–49	23–3 (11–2)	Pauley Pavilion (9,727); Los Angeles, CA
February 23, 2008; ABC	No. 6	Oregon	W 75–65	24–3 (12–2)	Pauley Pavilion (11,355); Los Angeles, CA
February 28, 2008; FSN PT	No. 4	at Arizona State	W 79–40	25–3 (12–2)	Wells Fargo Arena (11,419); Tempe, AZ
March 2, 2008; CBS	No. 4	at Arizona	W 68–66	26–3 (14–2)	McKale Center (14,624); Tucson, AZ
March 6, 2008; FSN	No. 2	No. 7 Stanford	W 77–67 ^{OT}	27–3 (15–2)	Pauley Pavilion (12,671); Los Angeles, CA
March 8, 2008; ABC	No. 2	California	W 81–80	28–3 (16–2)	Pauley Pavilion (11,614); Los Angeles, CA
Pac-10 Tournament
March 13, 2008; FSN	No. 2 (1)	vs. (9) California; Quarterfinals	W 88–66	29–3	Staples Center (17,194); Los Angeles, CA
March 14, 2008; FSN	No. 2 (1)	vs. (4) USC; Semifinals	W 57–54	30–3	Staples Center (18,997); Los Angeles, CA
March 15, 2008; CBS	No. 2 (1)	vs. No. 11 (2) Stanford; Finals	W 67–64	31–3	Staples Center (17,534); Los Angeles, CA
NCAA tournament
March 20, 2008*; CBS	No. 2 (1 W)	vs. (16 W) Mississippi Valley State; First Round	W 70–29	32–3	Honda Center (17,600); Anaheim, CA
March 22, 2008*; CBS	No. 2 (1 W)	vs. (9 W) Texas A&M; Second Round	W 51–49	33–3	Honda Center (17,600); Anaheim, CA
March 27, 2008*; CBS	No. 2 (1 W)	vs. (12 W) Western Kentucky; Sweet Sixteen	W 88–78	34–3	US Airways Center (18,103); Phoenix, AZ
March 29, 2008*; CBS	No. 2 (1 W)	vs. No. 12 (3 W) Xavier; Elite Eight	W 76–57	35–3	US Airways Center (18,103); Phoenix, AZ
April 5, 2008; CBS	No. 2 (1 W)	vs. No. 3 (1 S) Memphis; Final Four	L 63–78 (Note: Memphis vacated 38 wins from the 2007–08)	35–4	Alamodome (43,718); San Antonio, TX
*Non-conference game. ^{#}Rankings from AP Poll. (#) Tournament seedings in parentheses. All times are in Pacific Time.

== Awards ==
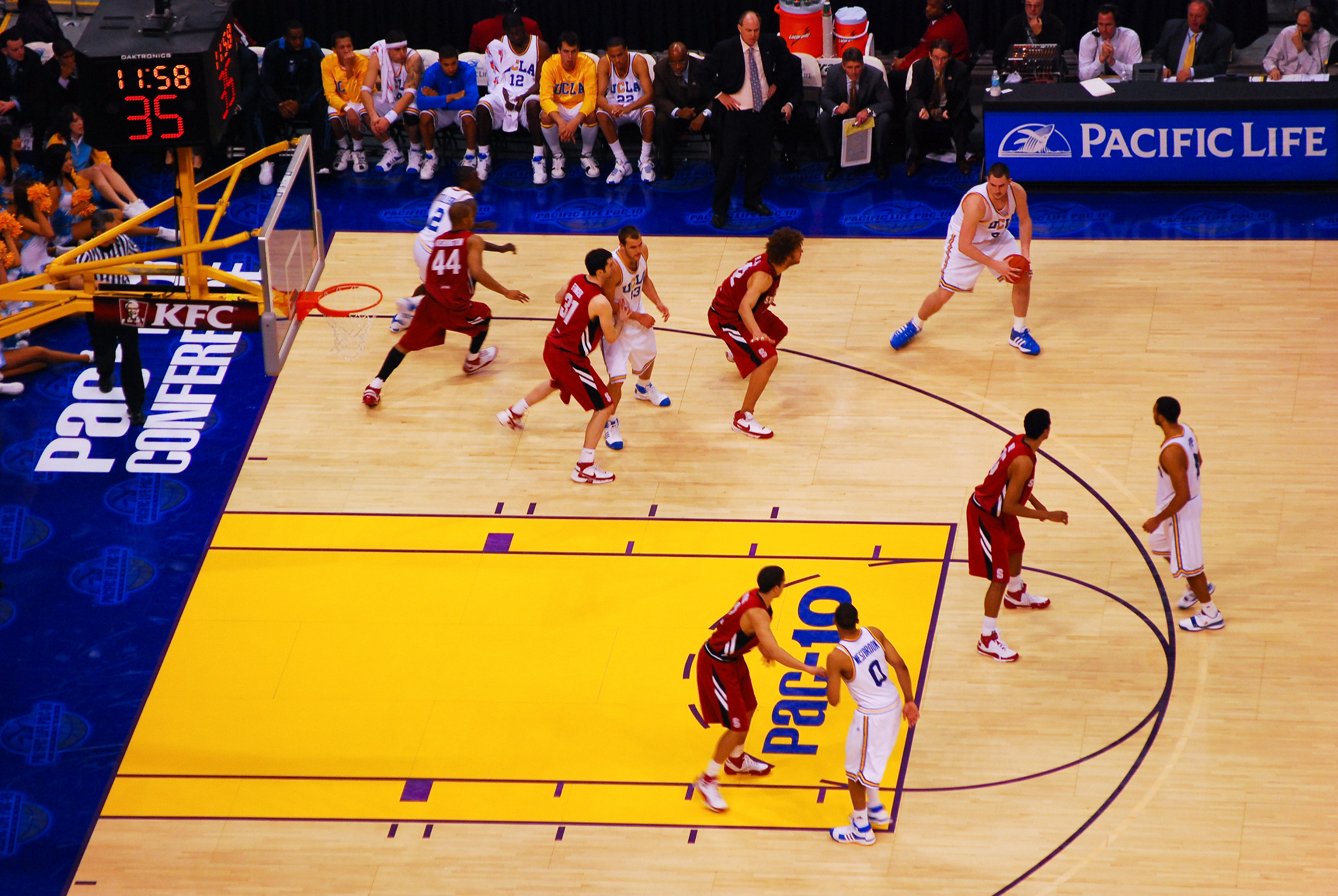
UCLA's Kevin Love on the perimeter at Pac-10 Championship game against Stanford at Staples Center, Los Angeles, 2008. Ben Howland and the UCLA bench looks on from the sideline.

Pac-10 Player of the Year

Kevin Love

Pac-10 Freshman of the Year

Kevin Love

Pac-10 Defensive Player of the Year

Russell Westbrook

All-Pac-10 first team

Kevin Love

All-Pac-10 second team

Darren Collison

All-Pac-10 third team

Russell Westbrook

Pac-10 All-Defensive team

Darren Collison
Russell Westbrook
Kevin Love (honorable mention)
Luc Richard Mbah a Moute (honorable mention)

Pac-10 Tournament Most Outstanding Player

Darren Collison

Pac-10 All-Tournament Team

Kevin Love
Russell Westbrook

U.S. Basketball Writers Association First Team All-America

Kevin Love

Oscar Robertson Trophy nominee

Kevin Love

U.S. Basketball Writers Association District IX Player of the Year

Kevin Love

U.S. Basketball Writers Association All-District IX team

Kevin Love
Darren Collison

Pac-10 Men's Basketball Player of the Week

Kevin Love – November 19–25
Kevin Love – January 7–13
Kevin Love – January 21–27
Darren Collison – February 12–18

== See also ==
- 2008 NCAA Division I men's basketball tournament
- 2008 Pacific-10 Conference men's basketball tournament
- 2007-08 NCAA Division I men's basketball season
- 2007-08 NCAA Division I men's basketball rankings

== Notes ==
- The Bruins had the most ever wins for a final record (including postseason tournaments) as well, with 35.
- Seven of the Bruins wins were vs. ranked teams (AP Top-25) at the time they played: (#11 Michigan State, #20 Stanford, #4 Washington State, #17 Washington State, #7 Stanford, #11 Stanford and #12 Xavier)
