= 2007–08 USC Trojans men's basketball team =

American college basketball season

2007–08 USC Trojans men's basketball

NCAA men's Division I tournament, first round (Vacated)
- Conference: Pacific-10 Conference
- Record: 0–11 (21 wins, 1 loss vacated) (0–7 Pac-10, 11 wins vacated)
- Head coach: Tim Floyd

2007–08 Pacific-10 Conference men's basketball standings
	Conf.				Overall
Team	W		L	PCT	W		L	PCT
No. 2 UCLA†	16	–	2	.889	35	–	4	.897
No. 11 Stanford	13	–	5	.722	28	–	8	.778
No. 21 Washington State	11	–	7	.611	26	–	9	.743
Arizona State	9	–	9	.500	21	–	13	.618
Oregon	9	–	9	.500	18	–	14	.563
Arizona	8	–	10	.444	19	–	15	.559
Washington	7	–	11	.389	16	–	17	.485
California	6	–	12	.333	17	–	16	.515
Oregon State	0	–	18	.000	6	–	25	.194
USC*	0	–	7	.000	0	–	12	.000
† Conference tournament winner As of April 5, 2008; Rankings from AP Poll; *USC vacated 11 conference and 21 overall wins, due to NCAA rules violations.

== Class of 2007 ==
College recruiting
Name	Hometown	School	Height	Weight	Commit date
Mamadou Diarra; C	Tarzana, CA	Stoneridge Preparatory School	6 ft 10 in (2.08 m)	215 lb (98 kg)	Mar 30, 2007
Mamadou Diarra; C	Recruit ratings: Scout: Rivals: (79)				
Davon Jefferson; SF	Patterson, NC	Patterson School	6 ft 7 in (2.01 m)	190 lb (86 kg)	Feb 22, 2006
Davon Jefferson; SF	Recruit ratings: Scout: Rivals: (40)				
Angelo Johnson; PG	Tarzana, CA	Stoneridge Preparatory School	5 ft 11 in (1.80 m)	170 lb (77 kg)	Apr 13, 2007
Angelo Johnson; PG	Recruit ratings: Scout: Rivals: (80)				
O. J. Mayo; PG	Huntington, WV	Huntington HS	6 ft 4 in (1.93 m)	190 lb (86 kg)	Nov 15, 2006
O. J. Mayo; PG	Recruit ratings: Scout: Rivals: (98)				
Marcus Simmons; SG	Alexandria, LA	Peabody Magnet HS	6 ft 6 in (1.98 m)	200 lb (91 kg)	Nov 15, 2006
Marcus Simmons; SG	Recruit ratings: Scout: Rivals: (93)				
Overall Recruiting Rankings: Scout – 13 Rivals – 2 ESPN –

== Roster ==
Number	Name	Height	Position	Class
0	Kyle Austin	6–7	F	SO
33	RouSean Cromwell	6–11	F	JR
43	Kasey Cunningham	6–7	F	FR
14	Mamadou Diarra	7-0	F	FR
3	James Dunleavy	6–6	G	FR
22	Taj Gibson	6–9	F	SO
30	Terence Green	5-11	G	JR
13	Daniel Hackett	6–5	G	SO
5	Davon Jefferson	6–8	F	FR
1	Angelo Johnson	5-11	F	FR
21	Dwight Lewis	6–5	G	SO
32	O. J. Mayo	6–5	G	FR
20	Marcus Simmons	6–6	G	FR
2	Ryan Wetherell	5–11	G	SO
23	Keith Wilkinson	6–10	F	JR

=== Schedule ===
Date	Location	Opponent	rank	Result	Score	Record	Pac-10 Record
11/10/2007 (Trojan TV All-Access)	Galen Center – Los Angeles, CA	Mercer	18	L	81-96	0-1	
11/15/2007	McAlister Field House – Charleston, SC	The Citadel		W	74-47	1-1	
11/17/2007	Colonial Center – Columbia, SC	South Carolina		W	85-75	2–1	
11/22/2007 (ESPN2)	Anaheim Convention Center – Anaheim, CA - Anaheim Classic	San Diego		W	60-50	3-1	
11/23/2007 (ESPNU)	Anaheim Convention Center – Anaheim, CA – Anaheim Classic	Miami (OH)		W	57-53	4-1	
11/25/2007 (ESPN2)	Anaheim Convention Center – Anaheim, CA - Anaheim Classic	#18 Southern Illinois		W	70-45	5-1	
11/29/2007 (FSN)	Galen Center – Los Angeles, CA - Big 12/Pac-10 Hardwood Series	Oklahoma	24	W	66-55	6-1	
12/02/2007 (FSN)	Galen Center – Los Angeles, CA	#4 Kansas	24	L	55-59	6-2	
12/04/2007 (ESPN)	Madison Square Garden – New York, NY	#2 Memphis (Jimmy V Classic)		L	58-62	6-3	
12/17/2007 (Trojan TV All-Access)	Galen Center – Los Angeles, CA	Delaware State		W	83-54	7-3	
12/22/2007 (Trojan TV All-Access)	Galen Center – Los Angeles, CA	Cal Poly		W	78-55	8-3	
12/29/2007 (Trojan TV All-Access)	Galen Center – Los Angeles, CA	UC Riverside		W	70-57	9-3	
1/3/2008	Haas Pavilion – Berkeley, CA	California		L	82-92	9–4	0–1
1/5/2008 (FSNPT)	Maples Pavilion – Palo Alto, CA	#20 Stanford		L	46-52	9-5	0-2
1/10/2008 (FSN)	Galen Center – Los Angeles, CA	#4 Washington State		L	58-73	9-6	0-3
1/12/2008 (FSNPT)	Galen Cener – Los Angeles, CA	Washington		W	66-51	10-6	1-3
1/19/2008 (CBS)	Pauley Pavilion – Los Angeles, CA	#4 UCLA		W	72-63	11–6	2–3
1/24/2008 (FSN West)	Gill Coliseum – Corvallis, OR	Oregon State		W	68-44	12-6	3–3
1/26/2008 (FSN)	McArthur Court – Eugene, OR	Oregon		W	95-86	13-6	4–3
1/31/2008 (FSN)	Galen Center – Los Angeles, CA	Arizona		L	69-80	13-7	4-4
2/2/2008 (FSNPT)	Galen Center – Los Angeles, CA	Arizona State		W	67-53	14-7	5-4
2/7/2008 (FSNPT)	Bank of America Arena – Seattle, WA	Washington		W	73-59	15-7	6–4
2/9/2008 (ABC)	Friel Court – Pullman, WA	#17 Washington State		L	50-74	15-8	6–5
2/17/2008 (FSN)	Galen Center – Los Angeles, CA	#6 UCLA		L	46-56	15–9	6–6
2/21/2008 (FSN)	Galen Center – Los Angeles, CA	Oregon		W	81-75	16-9	7-6
2/23/2008 (FSN West)	Galen Center – Los Angeles, CA	Oregon State		W	81-53	17-9	8-6
2/28/2008 (ESPN)	McKale Center – Tucson, AZ	Arizona		W	70-58	18-9	9-6
3/1/2008 (FSNPT)	Wells Fargo Arena – Tempe, AZ	Arizona State		L	66-80	18-10	9-7
3/6/2008	Galen Center – Los Angeles, CA	California		W	93-89 OT	19-10	10-7
3/8/2008 (CBS)	Galen Center – Los Angeles, CA	Stanford		W	77-64	20-10	11-7
3/13/2008 (FSN)	Staples Center – Los Angeles, CA - 2008 Pacific-10 Conference men's basketball tournament	Arizona State		W	59-55	21-10	
3/14/2008 (FSN)	Staples Center – Los Angeles, CA - 2008 Pacific-10 Conference men's basketball tournament	#2 UCLA		L	54-57	21-11	
3/20/2008 (CBS)	Qwest Center Omaha – Omaha, NE - NCAA tournament	Kansas State		L	67-80	21-12	

Rankings reflect the USA Today Coaches Poll.

== Regular season ==
=== Pacific-10 tournament ===
In the 2008 Pacific-10 Conference men's basketball tournament, the Trojans lost to UCLA, featuring Kevin Love, in the semi-finals. Both Mayo and Love were selected to the All-Pac-10 tournament team. In his NCAA tournament debut with the Trojans, Mayo scored 20 points as USC was beaten by Kansas State and freshman Michael Beasley.

- Quarterfinals (March 13)
  - UCLA 88, California 66
- Semifinals (March 14)
  - UCLA 57, USC 54

== NCAA tournament ==
Seeding in brackets

- Midwest
  - Kansas State (11) 80, Southern California (6) 67

== Awards and honors ==
- O. J. Mayo, All-Pac-10 tournament team

== Team players drafted into the NBA ==
Round	Pick	Player	NBA club
1	3	O. J. Mayo	Minnesota Timberwolves

== Punishment for NCAA rules violations ==
On January 3, 2010, USC announced it would punish the Men's Basketball Program for rules violations committed in the 2007–2008 season, when O. J. Mayo attended USC and Tim Floyd was still the head coach. Mayo received improper benefits in violation of NCAA rules while at USC, and Floyd was found to have assisted in the obtainment of these improper benefits. USC has declared Mayo was therefore ineligible to play in 2007–2008, and as a result, USC has vacated all wins from the 2007–2008 regular season, dropping their record to 1–32. The one win would be over Arizona State during the Pac-10 Conference tournament, as USC has only announced the vacation of all wins from the 2007–2008 regular season.*

Since the initial announcement reported by ESPN, USC clarified that all wins during the 2007–2008 season, including any wins during the Pac-10 Conference tournament, would be vacated and not forfeited, meaning USC's record for 2007–2008 is 0–12, not 1–32 as previously reported. Vacated wins result in no win/loss application for the team vacating the win, unlike a forfeit, in which the forfeiting team is charged with a loss, and its opponent awarded a victory.

Noel M. Ragsdale, law professor, University of Southern California, is the chair of the five-member Division I Infractions Appeals Committee, which hears and acts on the findings of major violations by the Division I Committee on Infractions.
