= 2007 Anaheim Classic =

- Season: 2007–08
- Teams: 8
- Finals site: Anaheim Convention Center; Anaheim, California
- Champions: USC
- MVP: O. J. Mayo, USC

The 2007 Anaheim Classic was played between November 22 and November 25, 2007 at the Anaheim Convention Center in Anaheim, California. The champion of the tournament was USC, who defeated Southern Illinois in the Championship Game. The Most Outstanding Player of the tournament was O. J. Mayo of USC.

== Bracket ==
* – Denotes overtime period

5th Place Game; November 24
Chattanooga	67
South Alabama	84
7th Place Game; November 24
UC Irvine	57
San Diego	60

Consolation 2nd Round; November 23
UC Irvine	80
Chattanooga	85
South Alabama	77
San Diego	55

First Round; November 22
Mississippi State	68
UC Irvine	53
Chattanooga	63
18	Southern Illinois	71
Miami (Ohio)	64
South Alabama	59
6	San Diego	50
USC	60

Semifinals; November 23
Mississippi State	49
18	Southern Illinois	63
Miami (Ohio)	53
USC	57

Championship; November 24
18	Southern Illinois	45
USC	70
3rd Place Game; November 24
Mississippi State	60
Miami (Ohio)	67

=== All Tournament Team ===
- O. J. Mayo, USC - Tournament MVP
- Randal Falker, Southern Illinois
- Michael Bramos, Miami (Ohio)
- Tim Pollitz, Miami (Ohio)
- Jamont Gordon, Mississippi State
