= 2007–08 Arizona State Sun Devils men's basketball team =

American college basketball season

2007–08 Arizona State Sun Devils men's basketball

National Invitation Tournament, Quarterfinals
- Conference: Pacific-10 Conference
- Record: 21–13 (9–9 Pac-10)
- Head coach: Herb Sendek
- Home arena: Wells Fargo Arena

The 2007–08 Arizona State Sun Devils men's basketball team represented Arizona State University during the 2007–08 NCAA Division I men's basketball season. The Sun Devils played their home games at the Wells Fargo Arena and were members of the Pacific-10 Conference. The Sun Devils finished with 21–13, 9–9 in Pac-10 play. They were invited to play in the 2008 National Invitation Tournament where they beat Alabama State and Southern Illinois. They subsequently lost in the quarter finals to Florida.

== Roster ==
2007–08 Arizona State Sun Devils men's basketball team
Players	Coaches
Pos. / # / Name / Height / Weight / Year / Hometown; G / 13 / James Harden / 6 ft 5 in (1.96 m) / 205 lb (93 kg) / Fr / Los Angeles, California	Head coach: Herb Sendek; Assistant coach(es) Legend: (C) Team captain; (S) Suspended; (I) Ineligible; (W) Walk-on; Injured; Current redshirt

== Schedule and results ==
Date time, TV	Rank^{#}	Opponent^{#}	Result	Record	Site city, state
Regular Season
Nov 19, 2007*		vs. Illinois; Maui Invitational Tournament	L 54–77	0–1	Lahaina Civic Center; Lahaina, Hawaii
Nov 20, 2007*		vs. Princeton; Maui Invitational Tournament	W 61–42	1–1	Lahaina Civic Center; Lahaina, Hawaii
Nov 21, 2007*		vs. LSU; Maui Invitational Tournament	W 87–84 ^{OT}	2–1	Lahaina Civic Center; Lahaina, Hawaii
Dec 2, 2007*		at Nebraska	L 47–62	4–2	Bob Devaney Sports Center; Lincoln, Nebraska
Dec 29, 2007*		Saint Francis (PA)	W 95–56	10–2	Wells Fargo Arena; Tucson, Arizona
Pac-10 Tournament
Mar 13, 2008*		vs. USC; Quarterfinals	L 55–59	19–12	Staples Center; Los Angeles, California
National Invitation Tournament
Mar 18, 2008*		Alabama State	W 64–53	20–12	Wells Fargo Arena; Tucson, Arizona
Mar 20, 2008*		Southern Illinois	W 65–51	21–12	Wells Fargo Arena; Tucson, Arizona
Mar 25, 2008*		Florida	L 57–70	21–13	Wells Fargo Arena; Tucson, Arizona
*Non-conference game. ^{#}Rankings from AP Poll. (#) Tournament seedings in parentheses.
