= McArthur Court =

Basketball arena in Oregon, United States

- The Pit, Mac Court
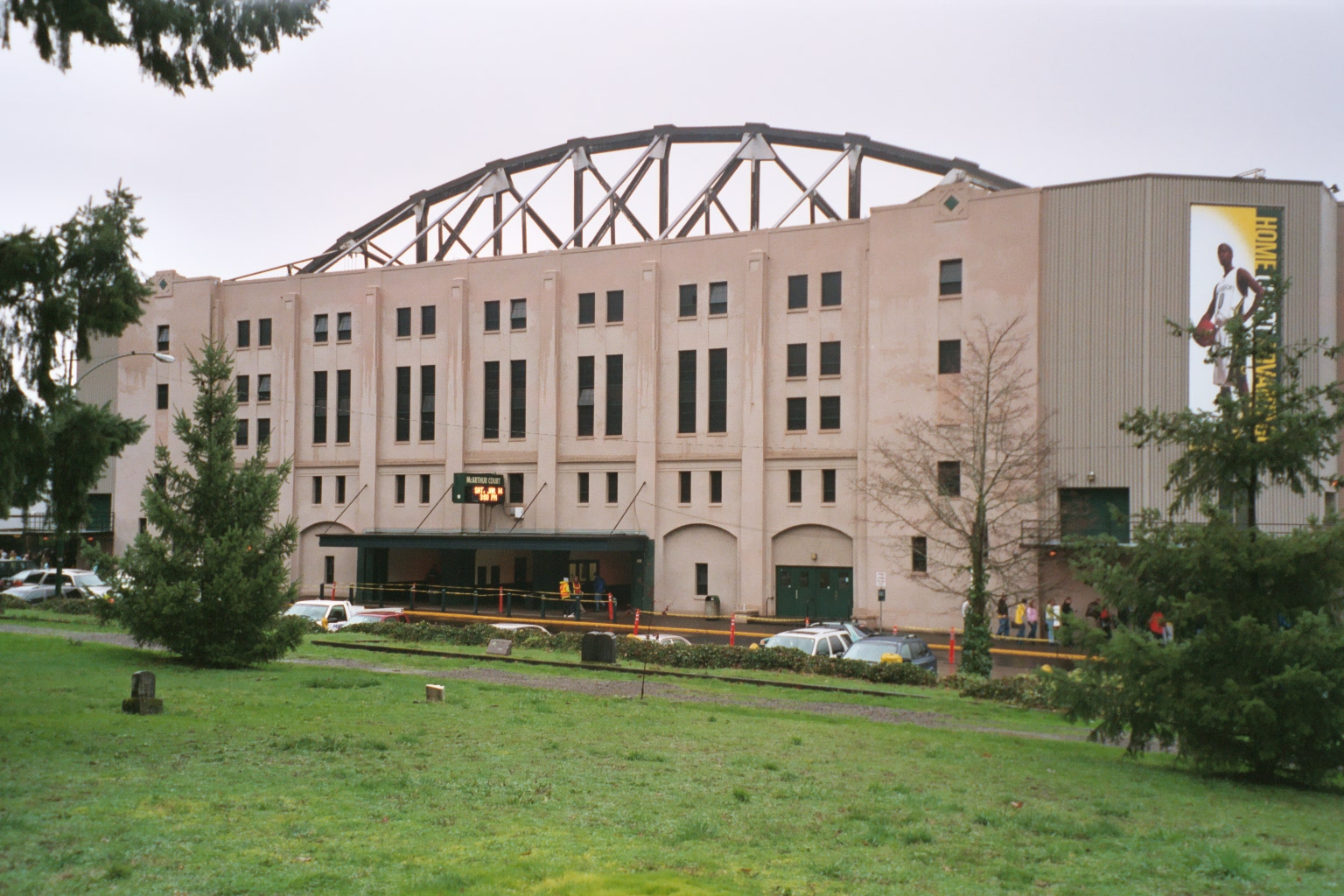

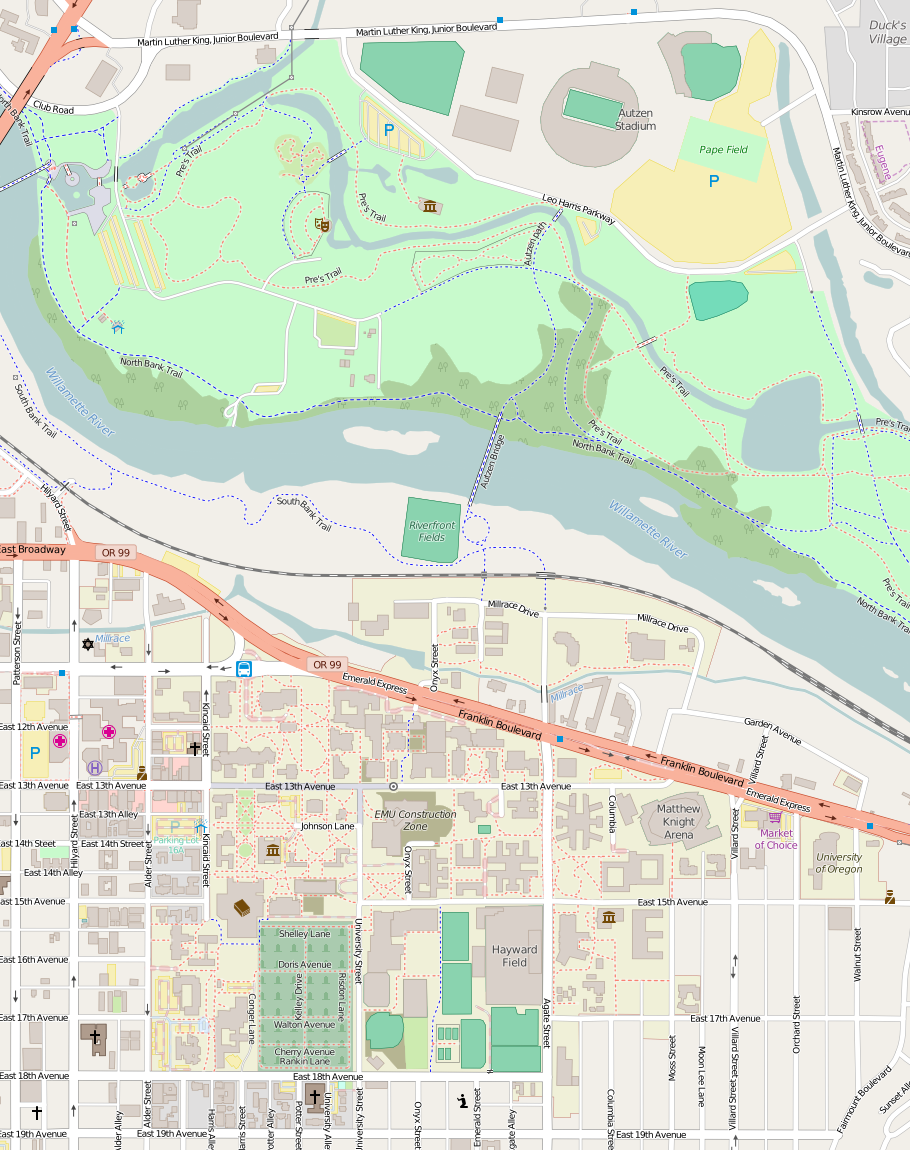
- Location within University of Oregon Campus
- Location: 1601 University Street; University of Oregon, Eugene, Oregon
- Coordinates: 44.0416°N 123.0740°W
- Owner: University of Oregon
- Operator: University of Oregon
- Capacity: 9,087

Construction
- Groundbreaking: 1926
- Opened: December 1926; 99 years ago
- Cost: $5 million (1996 renovation)
- Architects: Lawrence & Holford

McArthur Court is a basketball arena located on the campus of the University of Oregon in Eugene and the former home of the Oregon Ducks men's and women's basketball teams, replaced in 2011 by Matthew Knight Arena.

Also known as "The Pit" or "Mac Court," it was known as one of the most hostile arenas in the nation. The arena is named for Clifton N. (Pat) McArthur, U. S. Congressman and Oregon student-athlete and the school's first student body president.

Its unique and antiquated structure has the fans on top of the court. The maple floor bounces under the weight of the student section that surrounds the court. In 2001 Sporting News named it "best gym in America". For its history, character, and atmosphere, sports writer and arena researcher Bill Kintner named McArthur Court in his top five of college basketball arenas in America. He notes that McArthur Court "is a building that will give you chills even if there is no game being played."

The arena was funded by a $15 fee imposed by the Associated Students of the University of Oregon and the mortgage papers were burned as part of a public ceremony after the building was completely paid for.

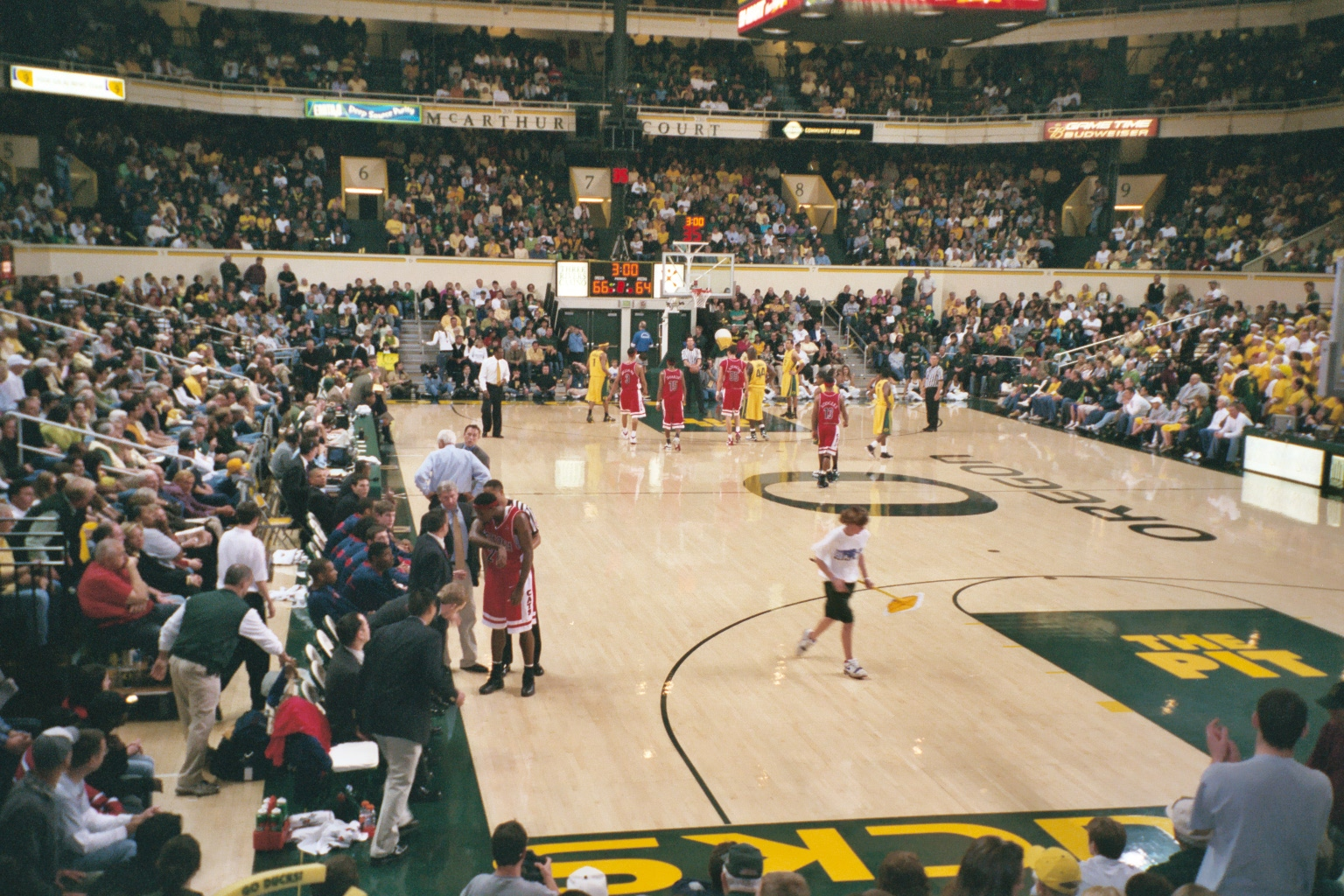
Interior of McArthur Court

Until it was replaced in 2011, it was the second-oldest on-campus arena still in use, after Fordham University's Rose Hill Gym. McArthur Court saw its first game on January 14, 1927, a 38–10 Oregon victory over Willamette University. Among its finest moments are two upsets over #1 UCLA in the mid-1970s and another upset of the top-ranked Bruins on January 6, 2007. An undefeated home season in 2001–02 propelled the Ducks to the "Elite Eight" in the NCAA Tournament. Players to call the court home over the years include Ron Lee, Greg Ballard, Blair Rasmussen, Terrell Brandon, Fred Jones, Luke Ridnour, Luke Jackson, Malik Hairston, and Aaron Brooks.

Women began playing in 1974 and played their first game at McArthur Court on January 23, 1974 against Southern Oregon University. Mac Court was also home to the OSAA high school Class A-1 state basketball tournament from 1947 to 1965, and the AA, 5A and 6A boys' basketball championships from 1971 to 1996 and 2004 to 2009.

Elvis Presley performed on 11-25-1976 and 11-27-1976. The Grateful Dead played on 05-31-1969 and 01-22-1978, the latter of which was officially released as Dave's Picks Volume 23. The Clash performed on 05-29-1984.

== McArthur Court records ==
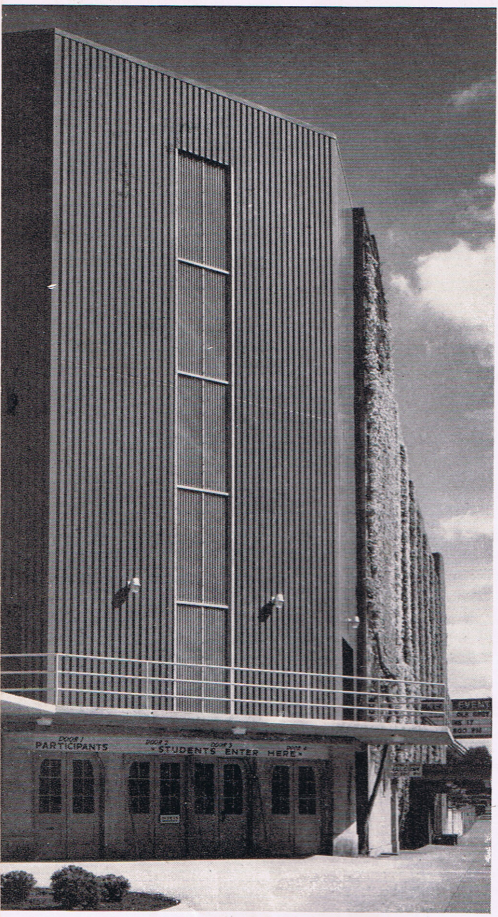
McArthur Court in 1958

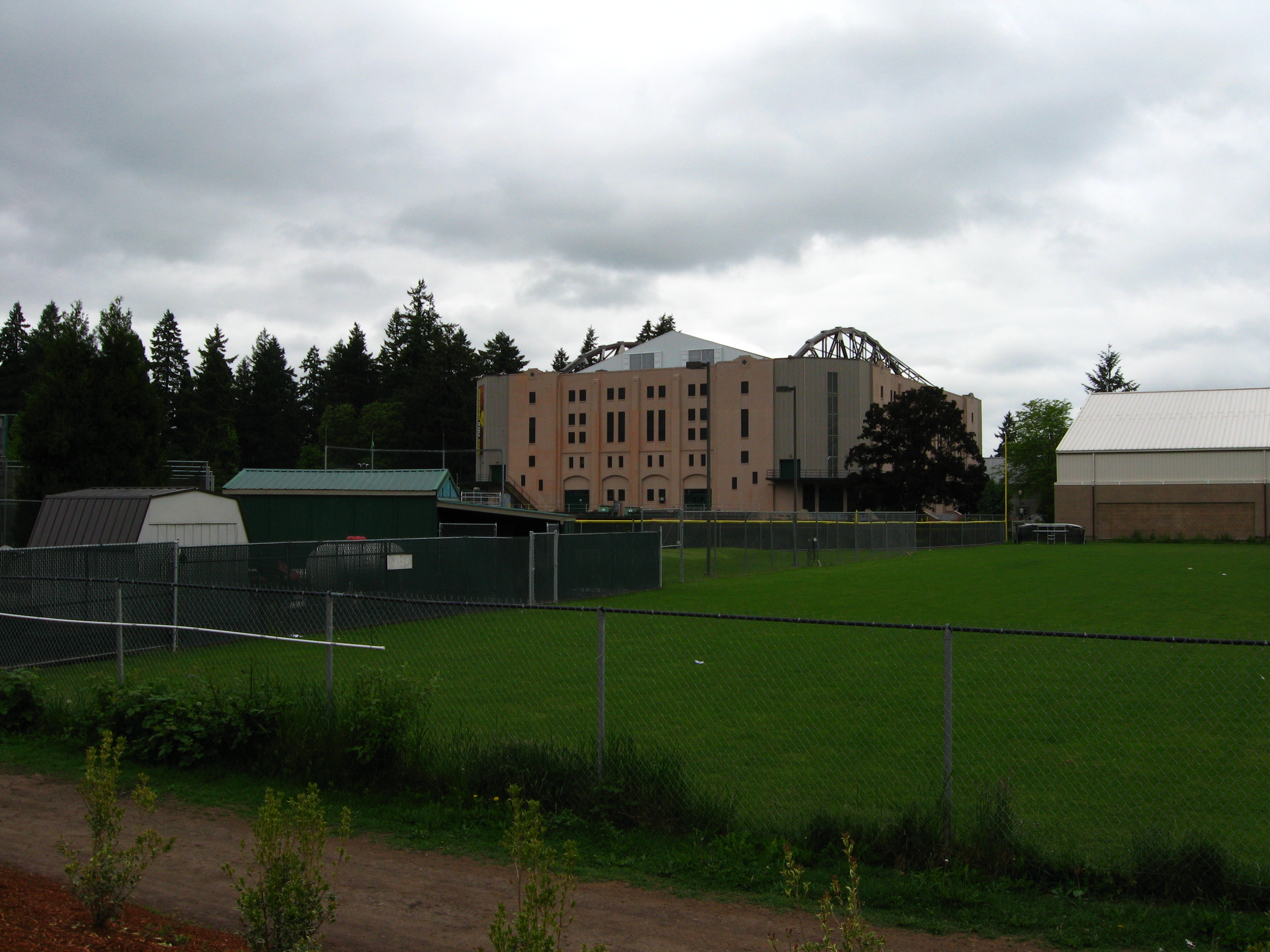
McArthur Court in 2008

Team

- Scoring – 116 vs. Villanova (12/23/1974), vs. Portland State (11/12/2006)
- Scoring, One Half – 68 vs. Portland State (11/12/2006)
- Scoring, Two Teams – 210, UCLA (107) vs. Oregon (103) (2/8/1975)
- Scoring, Two Teams, One Half – 121, Oregon (61) vs. UCLA (60) (2/8/1975)
- Field Goals Made – 45, UCLA (12/10/1968)
- Field Goal Attempts – 109 vs. Idaho (2/14/1947)
- Field Goal Percentage – .769, Stanford (30-39) (1/8/1983)
- 3-Point Field Goals Made – 17 vs. Portland State (11/12/2006)
- 3-Point Field Goal Attempts – 41, Oral Roberts (12/20/1991)
- 3-Point Field Goal Percentage – .857 (6-7) vs. Arizona State (1/2/1987), vs. Washington (1/22/1987)
- Free Throws Made – 35 vs. Arizona State (12/20/2001)
- Free Throw Attempts – 54 vs. Washington (2/10/2005)
- Free Throw Percentage – 1.000 vs. Washington State (19-19), 1-21-2003
- Rebounds – 77 vs. Brigham Young, 1-28-1955
- Fouls – 41, Cal State Northridge vs. Portland State, 11-10-2006 (40, Oregon vs. Oregon State, 3-1-1947)
- Fouls, Two Teams – 68, Oregon (36) vs. Washington (32), 2-28-1975; Cal State Northridge (41) vs. Portland State (27), 11-10-2006

Individual

- Scoring – 44, John Block, USC, 2-18-1966 (42, Luke Jackson vs. Arizona, 2-19-2004)
- Field Goals Made – 18, John Block, USC, 2-18-1966 (17, Stan Love vs. California, 2-13-1970)
- Field Goal Attempts – 33, Nick Jones vs. Washington, 1-13-1967
- 3-Point Field Goals Made – 10, Tajuan Porter vs. Portland State, 11-12-2006
- 3-Point Field Goal Attempts – 17, Kevin Franklin, Nevada, 12-16-1989 (15, James Davis vs. Arizona State, 2-21-2004)
- Free Throws Made – 18, Chuck Rask vs. Oregon State, 3-5-1960
- Free Throw Attempts – 20, Brian Rison, Washington State, 1-19-1980 (19, Max Anderson vs. Oregon State, 3-9-1957 and Chuck Rask vs. Oregon State, 3-5-1960)
- Rebounds – 32, Jim Loscutoff vs. Brigham Young, 1-28-1955
