= The Citadel Bulldogs basketball, 2000–2009 =

The Citadel Bulldogs basketball teams represented The Citadel, The Military College of South Carolina in Charleston, South Carolina, United States. The program was established in 1900–01, and has continuously fielded a team since 1912–13. Their primary rivals are College of Charleston, Furman and VMI.

== 1999–2000 ==
1999–2000 The Citadel Bulldogs men's basketball
- Conference: Southern Conference
- South Division
- Record: 10–20 (5–10 SoCon)
- Head coach: Pat Dennis
- Home arena: McAlister Field House

1999–2000 Southern Conference men's basketball standings
	Conf.				Overall
Team	W		L	PCT	W		L	PCT
North
Appalachian State†	13	–	3	.813	23	–	9	.719
Davidson	10	–	6	.625	15	–	13	.536
UNC Greensboro	9	–	7	.563	15	–	13	.536
East Tennessee State	8	–	8	.500	14	–	15	.483
Western Carolina	7	–	9	.438	14	–	14	.500
VMI	1	–	15	.063	6	–	23	.207
South
College of Charleston	13	–	3	.813	24	–	6	.800
Georgia Southern	10	–	6	.625	16	–	12	.571
Wofford	8	–	8	.500	14	–	16	.467
Chattanooga	6	–	10	.375	10	–	19	.345
The Citadel	5	–	10	.333	9	–	20	.310
Furman	5	–	10	.333	14	–	18	.438
† SoCon Tournament winner As of April 30, 2000; Rankings from AP poll

Date time, TV	Opponent	Result	Record	Site city, state
November 19*	Limestone	W 68–66	1–0	McAlister Field House; Charleston, South Carolina
November 21*	at South Carolina	L 51–68	1–1	Carolina Coliseum; Columbia, South Carolina
November 23*	Coastal Carolina	L 60–68	1–2	McAlister Field House; Charleston, South Carolina
November 27*	at Winthrop	L 51–71	1–3	Winthrop Coliseum; Rock Hill, South Carolina
November 30*	Anderson	W 84–82 ^{OT}	2–3	McAlister Field House; Charleston, South Carolina
December 3*	vs. Sacramento State; Northwest Mutual Classic	L 61–64	2–4	War Memorial Gymnasium; San Francisco
December 4*	vs. IUPUI; Northwest Mutual Classic	L 59–69	2–5	War Memorial Gymnasium; San Francisco
December 8*	Stetson	L 60–70	2–6	McAlister Field House; Charleston, South Carolina
December 11*	Emory	W 91–52	3–6	McAlister Field House; Charleston, South Carolina
December 21*	vs. South Florida; Pearl Harbor Invitational	L 72–98	3–7	George Q. Cannon Activities Center; Laie, HI
December 22*	at BYU–Hawaii; Pearl Harbor Invitational	L 78–92	3–8	George Q. Cannon Activities Center; Laie, HI
December 23*	vs. Florida A&M; Pearl Harbor Invitational	W 68–60	4–8	George Q. Cannon Activities Center; Laie, HI
December 30*	at Florida State	L 51–77	4–9	Donald L. Tucker Center; Tallahassee, Florida
January 3	Appalachian State	L 48–82	4–10 (0–1)	McAlister Field House; Charleston, South Carolina
January 8	Furman	W 78–63	5–10 (1–1)	McAlister Field House; Charleston, South Carolina
January 10	at Western Carolina	W 67–63	6–10 (2–1)	Ramsey Center; Cullowhee, North Carolina
January 15	at VMI	W 87–84 ^{OT}	7–10 (3–1)	Cameron Hall; Lexington, Virginia
January 17	Chattanooga	L 59–68	7–11 (3–2)	McAlister Field House; Charleston, South Carolina
January 22	at Georgia Southern	L 81–93	7–12 (3–3)	Hanner Fieldhouse; Statesboro, Georgia
January 25	Wofford	L 68–81	7–13 (3–4)	McAlister Field House; Charleston, South Carolina
January 29	at Furman	W N/A (Note: Record books record this game as a win due SoCon/NCAA sanctions against Furman for overscheduling.)	8–13 (4–4)	Timmons Arena; Greenville, South Carolina
January 31	at Wofford	L 68–81	8–14 (4–5)	Benjamin Johnson Arena; Spartanburg, South Carolina
February 5	Davidson	W 87–74	9–14 (5–5)	McAlister Field House; Charleston, South Carolina
February 7	at College of Charleston	L 52–65	9–15 (5–6)	John Kresse Arena; Charleston, South Carolina
February 12	Georgia Southern	L 52–58	9–16 (5–7)	McAlister Field House; Charleston, South Carolina
February 14	East Tennessee State	L 53–65	9–17 (5–8)	McAlister Field House; Charleston, South Carolina
February 19	College of Charleston	L 49–58	9–18 (5–9)	McAlister Field House; Charleston, South Carolina
February 21	at Chattanooga	W 63–61	10–18 (6–9)	McKenzie Arena; Chattanooga, Tennessee
February 26	at UNC Greensboro	L 58–75	10–19 (6–10)	Fleming Gymnasium; Greensboro, North Carolina
2000 Southern Conference men's basketball tournament
March 2	vs. East Tennessee State	L 71–85	10–20	BI-LO Center; Greenville, South Carolina
*Non-conference game. (#) Tournament seedings in parentheses. All times are in Eastern Time.

== 2000–01 ==
2000–01 The Citadel Bulldogs men's basketball
- Conference: Southern Conference
- South Division
- Record: 16–12 (9–7 SoCon)
- Head coach: Pat Dennis
- Home arena: McAlister Field House

2000–01 Southern Conference men's basketball standings
	Conf.				Overall
Team	W		L	PCT	W		L	PCT
North
East Tennessee State	13	–	3	.813	18	–	10	.643
UNC Greensboro †	10	–	6	.625	19	–	12	.613
Appalachian State	7	–	9	.438	11	–	20	.355
Davidson	7	–	9	.438	15	–	17	.469
VMI	5	–	11	.313	9	–	19	.321
Western Carolina	3	–	13	.188	6	–	25	.194
South
College of Charleston	12	–	4	.750	22	–	7	.759
Chattanooga	9	–	7	.563	17	–	13	.567
The Citadel	9	–	7	.563	16	–	12	.571
Georgia Southern	9	–	7	.563	15	–	15	.500
Wofford	7	–	9	.438	12	–	16	.429
Furman	5	–	11	.313	10	–	16	.385
† SoCon Tournament winner As of April 30, 2001; Rankings from AP poll

Date time, TV	Opponent	Result	Record	Site city, state
November 18*	Methodist	W 80–55	1–0	McAlister Field House; Charleston, South Carolina
November 20*	Limestone	W 78–72	2–0	McAlister Field House; Charleston, South Carolina
November 25*	at Clemson	L 76–84	2–1	Littlejohn Coliseum; Clemson, South Carolina
November 27*	Ferrum	W 105–75	3–1	McAlister Field House; Charleston, South Carolina
December 2*	at William & Mary	L 62–65	3–2	Kaplan Arena; Williamsburg, Virginia
December 5*	South Carolina	L 71–74	3–3	McAlister Field House; Charleston, South Carolina
December 9*	Oglethorpe	W 79–45	4–3	McAlister Field House; Charleston, South Carolina
December 18*	South Carolina State	W 62–44	5–3	McAlister Field House; Charleston, South Carolina
December 22*	at Coastal Carolina	L 74–85	5–4	Kimbel Arena; Conway, South Carolina
December 29*	vs. Colgate; Capital City Classic	W 86–55	6–4	Jake Gaither Gymnasium; Tallahassee, Florida
December 30*	vs. Morehead State; Capital City Classic	W 52–51	7–4	Jake Gaither Gymnasium; Tallahassee, Florida
January 3	UNC Greensboro	W 70–68	8–4 (1–0)	McAlister Field House; Charleston, South Carolina
January 6	at East Tennessee State	L 69–85	8–5 (1–1)	Memorial Center; Johnson City, Tennessee
January 8	Western Carolina	W 56–54 ^{OT}	9–5 (2–1)	McAlister Field House; Charleston, South Carolina
January 13	VMI	W 79–64	10–5 (3–1)	McAlister Field House; Charleston, South Carolina
January 15	at Wofford	L 58–79	10–6 (3–2)	Benjamin Johnson Arena; Spartanburg SC
January 20	at Georgia Southern	W 71–69	10–7 (3–3)	Hanner Fieldhouse; Statesboro, Georgia
January 22	at College of Charleston	L 67–74	10–8 (3–4)	John Kresse Arena; Charleston, South Carolina
January 27	Chattanooga	L 56–57	10–9 (3–5)	McAlister Field House; Charleston, South Carolina
January 29	at Appalachian State	L 74–81 ^{OT}	10–10 (3–6)	Holmes Center; Boone, North Carolina
February 3	Wofford	W 64–62	11–10 (4–6)	McAlister Field House; Charleston, South Carolina
February 5	Georgia Southern	W 71–69	12–10 (5–6)	McAlister Field House; Charleston, South Carolina
February 10	at Chattanooga	W 61–60	13–10 (6–6)	McKenzie Arena; Chattanooga, Tennessee
February 12	College of Charleston	W 62–58	14–10 (7–6)	McAlister Field House; Charleston, South Carolina
February 17	at Furman	W 65–56	15–10 (8–6)	Timmons Arena; Greenville, South Carolina
February 19	at Davidson	L 58–71	15–11 (8–7)	John M. Belk Arena; Davidson, North Carolina
February 25	Furman	W 66–56	16–11 (9–7)	McAlister Field House; Charleston, South Carolina
2001 Southern Conference men's basketball tournament
March 1	vs. Western Carolina	L 57–67	16–12	BI-LO Center; Greenville, South Carolina
*Non-conference game. (#) Tournament seedings in parentheses. All times are in Eastern Time.

== 2001–02 ==
2001–02 The Citadel Bulldogs men's basketball
- Conference: Southern Conference
- South Division
- Record: 17–12 (8–8 SoCon)
- Head coach: Pat Dennis
- Home arena: McAlister Field House

2001–02 Southern Conference men's basketball standings
	Conf.				Overall
Team	W		L	PCT	W		L	PCT
North
Davidson †	11	–	5	.688	21	–	10	.677
East Tennessee State	11	–	5	.688	18	–	10	.643
UNC Greensboro	11	–	5	.688	20	–	11	.645
Western Carolina	6	–	10	.375	12	–	16	.429
VMI	5	–	11	.313	10	–	18	.357
Appalachian State	5	–	11	.313	10	–	18	.357
South
Georgia Southern	9	–	7	.563	16	–	12	.571
Chattanooga	9	–	7	.563	16	–	14	.533
College of Charleston	9	–	7	.563	21	–	9	.700
The Citadel	8	–	8	.500	17	–	12	.586
Furman	7	–	9	.438	17	–	14	.548
Wofford	5	–	11	.313	11	–	18	.379
† SoCon Tournament winner As of March 19, 2002; Rankings from AP Poll

== 2002–03 ==
2002–03 The Citadel Bulldogs men's basketball
- Conference: Southern Conference
- South Division
- Record: 8–20 (3–13 SoCon)
- Head coach: Pat Dennis
- Assistant coach: Earl Grant
- Home arena: McAlister Field House

2002–03 Southern Conference men's basketball standings
	Conf.				Overall
Team	W		L	PCT	W		L	PCT
North
Davidson	11	–	5	.688	17	–	10	.630
East Tennessee State †	11	–	5	.688	20	–	11	.645
Appalachian State	11	–	5	.688	19	–	10	.655
Western Carolina	6	–	10	.375	9	–	19	.321
VMI	3	–	13	.188	10	–	20	.333
UNC Greensboro	3	–	13	.188	7	–	22	.241
South
College of Charleston	13	–	3	.813	25	–	8	.758
Chattanooga	11	–	5	.688	21	–	9	.700
Georgia Southern	8	–	8	.500	16	–	13	.552
Wofford	8	–	8	.500	14	–	15	.483
Furman	8	–	8	.500	14	–	17	.452
The Citadel	3	–	13	.188	8	–	20	.286
† SoCon Tournament winner As of April 30, 2003; Rankings from AP poll

Date time, TV	Opponent	Result	Record	Site city, state
November 22*	Webber International	W 83–60	1–0	McAlister Field House; Charleston, South Carolina
November 25*	at Navy	L 51–57	1–1	Alumni Hall; Annapolis, Maryland
November 27*	at No. 11 Maryland	L 49–97	1–2	Comcast Center; College Park, Maryland
December 2*	Charleston Southern	L 56–68	1–3	McAlister Field House; Charleston, South Carolina
December 5*	High Point	W 82–67	2–3	McAlister Field House; Charleston, South Carolina
December 9*	Oglethorpe	W 95–55	3–3	McAlister Field House; Charleston, South Carolina
December 18*	Southwestern (TX)	W 78–50	4–3	McAlister Field House; Charleston, South Carolina
December 21*	South Carolina State	L 66–78	4–4	McAlister Field House; Charleston, South Carolina
December 30*	at UCF	L 55–64	4–5	UCF Arena; Orlando, Florida
January 2*	at South Carolina	L 50–66	4–6	Carolina Coliseum; Columbia, South Carolina
January 5	at Davidson	L 72–86	4–7 (0–1)	John M. Belk Arena; Davidson, North Carolina
January 7*	Emmanuel	W 88–55	5–7	McAlister Field House; Charleston, South Carolina
January 11	at East Tennessee State	L 81–87	5–8 (0–2)	Memorial Center; Johnson City, Tennessee
January 13	Wofford	L 54–69	5–9 (0–3)	McAlister Field House; Charleston, South Carolina
January 18	Western Carolina	W 83–69	6–9 (1–3)	McAlister Field House; Charleston, South Carolina
January 21	at Georgia Southern	W 67–66	7–9 (2–3)	Hanner Fieldhouse; Statesboro, Georgia
January 25	College of Charleston	L 44–58	7–10 (2–4)	McAlister Field House; Charleston, South Carolina
January 27	at Chattanooga	L 64–79	7–11 (2–5)	McKenzie Arena; Chattanooga, Tennessee
February 1	at Appalachian State	L 65–75	7–12 (2–6)	Holmes Center; Boone, North Carolina
February 3	Furman	W 69–55	8–12 (3–6)	McAlister Field House; Charleston, South Carolina
February 8	Chattanooga	L 67–74	8–13 (3–7)	McAlister Field House; Charleston, South Carolina
February 10	at College of Charleston	L 75–84	8–14 (3–8)	John Kresse Arena; Charleston, South Carolina
February 15	UNC Greensboro	L 66–67	8–15 (3–9)	McAlister Field House; Charleston, South Carolina
February 17	at Furman	L 60–77	8–16 (3–10)	Timmons Arena; Greenville, South Carolina
February 22	Georgia Southern	L 63–64	8–17 (3–11)	McAlister Field House; Charleston, South Carolina
February 24	VMI	L 49–58	8–18 (3–12)	McAlister Field House; Charleston, South Carolina
March 1	at Wofford	L 63–75	8–19 (3–13)	Benjamin Johnson Arena; Spartanburg, South Carolina
2003 Southern Conference men's basketball tournament
March 5	vs. Appalachian State	L 63–73	8–20	North Charleston Coliseum; North Charleston, South Carolina
*Non-conference game. (#) Tournament seedings in parentheses. All times are in Eastern Time.

== 2003–04 ==
2003–04 The Citadel Bulldogs men's basketball
- Conference: Southern Conference
- South Division
- Record: 6–22 (2–14 SoCon)
- Head coach: Pat Dennis
- Assistant coach: Earl Grant
- Home arena: McAlister Field House

2003–04 Southern Conference men's basketball standings
	Conf.				Overall
Team	W		L	PCT	W		L	PCT
North
East Tennessee State †	15	–	1	.938	27	–	6	.818
Chattanooga	10	–	6	.625	19	–	11	.633
Elon	7	–	9	.438	12	–	18	.400
UNC Greensboro	7	–	9	.438	11	–	17	.393
Western Carolina	6	–	10	.375	13	–	15	.464
Appalachian State	4	–	12	.250	9	–	21	.300
South
Georgia Southern	11	–	5	.688	21	–	8	.724
College of Charleston	11	–	5	.688	20	–	9	.690
Davidson	11	–	5	.688	17	–	12	.586
Furman	8	–	8	.500	17	–	12	.586
Wofford	4	–	12	.250	9	–	20	.310
The Citadel	2	–	14	.125	6	–	22	.214
† SoCon Tournament winner As of April 30, 2004; Rankings from AP poll

Date time, TV	Opponent	Result	Record	Site city, state
November 22*	Webber International	W 79–75	1–0	McAlister Field House; Charleston, South Carolina
November 25*	Washington and Lee	W 62–44	2–0	McAlister Field House; Charleston, South Carolina
November 28*	UCF	L 60–74	2–1	McAlister Field House; Charleston, South Carolina
December 1	Appalachian State	L 62–72	2–2 (0–1)	McAlister Field House; Charleston, South Carolina
December 3*	South Carolina	L 38–70	2–3	McAlister Field House; Charleston, South Carolina
December 6*	Emmanuel	L 66–71 ^{OT}	2–4	McAlister Field House; Charleston, South Carolina
December 9*	at South Carolina State	L 51–65	2–5	SHM Memorial Center; Orangeburg, South Carolina
December 17*	at Tennessee	L 49–99	2–6	Thompson–Boling Arena; Knoxville, Tennessee
December 19*	Chowan	W 89–72	3–6	McAlister Field House; Charleston, South Carolina
December 22*	Georgetown	L 63–85	3–7	McAlister Field House; Charleston, South Carolina
December 30*	at High Point	L 70–94	3–8	Millis Athletic Convocation Center; High Point, North Carolina
January 2*	Army	W 82–58	4–8	McAlister Field House; Charleston, South Carolina
January 6	at Davidson	L 44–68	4–9 (0–2)	John M. Belk Arena; Davidson, North Carolina
January 10	at Georgia Southern	L 58–86	4–10 (0–3)	Hanner Fieldhouse; Statesboro, Georgia
January 17	Chattanooga	L 49–73	4–11 (0–4)	McAlister Field House; Charleston, South Carolina
January 19	Furman	L 61–76	4–12 (0–5)	McAlister Field House; Charleston, South Carolina
January 24	at UNC Greensboro	L 42–71	4–13 (0–6)	Fleming Gymnasium; Greensboro, North Carolina
January 26	at Western Carolina	L 66–75	4–14 (0–7)	Ramsey Center; Cullowhee, North Carolina
January 31	College of Charleston	L 45–69	4–15 (0–8)	McAlister Field House; Charleston, South Carolina
February 3	Davidson	L 49–67	4–16 (0–9)	McAlister Field House; Charleston, South Carolina
February 7	Wofford	L 68–78	4–17 (0–10)	McAlister Field House; Charleston, South Carolina
February 9	Elon	L 59–73	4–18 (0–11)	McAlister Field House; Charleston, South Carolina
February 14	at College of Charleston	L 39–59	4–19 (0–12)	John Kresse Arena; Charleston, South Carolina
February 16	at East Tennessee State	L 51–73	4–20 (0–13)	Memorial Center; Johnson City, Tennessee
February 21	at Furman	L 47–60	4–21 (0–14)	Timmons Arena; Greenville, South Carolina
February 23	at Wofford	W 68–65	5–21 (1–14)	Benjamin Johnson Arena; Spartanburg, South Carolina
February 28	Georgia Southern	W 68–65	6–21 (2–14)	McAlister Field House; Charleston, South Carolina
2004 Southern Conference men's basketball tournament
March 3	vs. Elon	L 56–66	6–22	North Charleston Coliseum; North Charleston, South Carolina
*Non-conference game. (#) Tournament seedings in parentheses. All times are in Eastern Time.

== 2004–05 ==
2004–05 The Citadel Bulldogs men's basketball
- Conference: Southern Conference
- South Division
- Record: 12–16 (4–12 SoCon)
- Head coach: Pat Dennis
- Home arena: McAlister Field House

2004–05 Southern Conference men's basketball standings
	Conf.				Overall
Team	W		L	PCT	W		L	PCT
North
Chattanooga †	10	–	6	.625	20	–	11	.645
UNC Greensboro	9	–	7	.563	18	–	12	.600
Appalachian State	9	–	7	.563	18	–	12	.600
Elon	5	–	11	.313	8	–	23	.258
East Tennessee State	4	–	12	.250	10	–	19	.345
Western Carolina	3	–	13	.188	8	–	22	.267
South
Davidson	16	–	0	1.000	23	–	9	.719
College of Charleston	10	–	6	.625	18	–	10	.643
Georgia Southern	10	–	6	.625	18	–	13	.581
Furman	9	–	7	.563	16	–	13	.552
Wofford	7	–	9	.438	14	–	14	.500
The Citadel	4	–	12	.250	12	–	16	.429
† SoCon Tournament winner As of April 30, 2005; Rankings from AP poll

Date time, TV	Opponent	Result	Record	Site city, state
November 20*	at Army	W 69–62	1–0	Christl Arena; West Point, New York
November 23*	Washington and Lee	W 73–62	2–0	McAlister Field House; Charleston, South Carolina
November 26*	at Georgetown	L 34–69	2–1	MCI Center; Washington, D.C.
November 29*	Chowan	W 80–61	3–1	McAlister Field House; Charleston, South Carolina
December 2*	Voorhees	W 95–60	4–1	McAlister Field House; Charleston, South Carolina
December 6*	Atlanta Christian	W 75–49	5–1	McAlister Field House; Charleston, South Carolina
December 15*	Savannah State	W 81–58	6–1	McAlister Field House; Charleston, South Carolina
December 17*	at Clemson	L 52–76	6–2	Littlejohn Coliseum; Clemson, South Carolina
December 21	Western Carolina	W 65–60	7–2 (1–0)	McAlister Field House; Charleston, South Carolina
December 30*	Navy	W 87–72	8–2	McAlister Field House; Charleston, South Carolina
January 5	at Chattanooga	L 57–66	8–3 (0–1)	McKenzie Arena; Chattanooga, Tennessee
January 8	Georgia Southern	W 76–65	9–3 (1–1)	McAlister Field House; Charleston, South Carolina
January 10*	at Savannah State	W 70–47	10–3	Tiger Arena; Savannah, Georgia
January 15	at Furman	L 59–83	10–4 (2–2)	Timmons Arena; Greenville, South Carolina
January 17	at Wofford	W 76–74	11–4 (3–2)	Benjamin Johnson Arena; Spartanburg, South Carolina
January 22	UNC Greensboro	L 68–78	11–5 (3–3)	McAlister Field House; Charleston, South Carolina
January 24	at East Tennessee State	W 80–76	12–5 (4–3)	Memorial Center; Johnson City, Tennessee
January 29	at Davidson	L 59–81	12–6 (4–4)	John M. Belk Arena; Davidson, North Carolina
January 31	Wofford	L 63–73	12–7 (4–5)	McAlister Field House; Charleston, South Carolina
February 3	at Appalachian State	L 66–84	12–8 (4–6)	Holmes Center; Boone, North Carolina
February 7	Furman	L 60–63	12–9 (4–7)	McAlister Field House; Charleston, South Carolina
February 10	College of Charleston	L 63–66	12–10 (4–8)	McAlister Field House; Charleston, South Carolina
February 14*	Georgia Southern	L 81–115	12–11 (4–9)	Hanner Fieldhouse; Statesboro, Georgia
February 17*	at Charleston Southern	L 46–65	12–12	CSU Field House; North Charleston, South Carolina
February 19	Elon	L 58–65	12–13 (4–10)	McAlister Field House; Charleston, South Carolina
February 22	Davidson	L 68–75	12–14 (4–11)	McAlister Field House; Charleston, South Carolina
February 26	at College of Charleston	L 48–80	12–15 (4–12)	John Kresse Arena; Charleston, South Carolina
2005 Southern Conference men's basketball tournament
March 2	vs. Appalachian State	L 59–68	12–16	McKenzie Arena; Chattanooga, Tennessee
*Non-conference game. (#) Tournament seedings in parentheses. All times are in Eastern Time.

== 2005–06 ==
2005–06 The Citadel Bulldogs men's basketball
- Conference: Southern Conference
- South Division
- Record: 10–21 (1–14 SoCon)
- Head coach: Pat Dennis
- Home arena: McAlister Field House

2005–06 Southern Conference men's basketball standings
	Conf.				Overall
Team	W		L	PCT	W		L	PCT
North
Elon	10	–	4	.714	15	–	14	.517
Chattanooga	8	–	6	.571	19	–	13	.594
Western Carolina	7	–	7	.500	13	–	17	.433
Appalachian State	6	–	8	.429	14	–	16	.467
UNC Greensboro	4	–	10	.286	12	–	19	.387
South
Georgia Southern	11	–	4	.733	20	–	10	.667
Davidson†	10	–	5	.667	20	–	11	.645
College of Charleston	9	–	6	.600	17	–	11	.607
Furman	8	–	7	.533	15	–	13	.536
Wofford	6	–	9	.400	11	–	18	.379
The Citadel	1	–	14	.067	10	–	21	.323
† SoCon Tournament winner As of April 30, 2006; Rankings from AP poll

Date time, TV	Opponent	Result	Record	Site city, state
November 18*	vs. Delaware; Hispanic College Fund Classic	L 57–77	0–1	RBC Center; Raleigh, North Carolina
November 19*	at NC State; Hispanic College Fund Classic	L 59–91	0–2	RBC Center; Raleigh, North Carolina
November 20*	Stetson; Hispanic College Fund Classic	W 73–60	1–2	RBC Center; Raleigh, North Carolina
November 23*	Asbury	W 75–48	2–2	McAlister Field House; Charleston, South Carolina
November 26*	at Army	W 70–68 ^{OT}	3–2	Christl Arena; West Point, New York
November 28*	Florida Christian	W 126–43	4–2	McAlister Field House; Charleston, South Carolina
December 1*	Charleston Southern	L 57–74	4–3	McAlister Field House; Charleston, South Carolina
December 5*	Atlanta Christian	W 126–61	5–3	McAlister Field House; Charleston, South Carolina
December 15*	Webber International	W 73–56	6–3	McAlister Field House; Charleston, South Carolina
December 18	at Western Carolina	L 57–83	6–4 (0–1)	Ramsey Center; Cullowhee, North Carolina
December 20*	at Duquesne	L 61–90	6–5	Palumbo Center; Pittsburgh
December 31*	at Navy	L 70–84	6–6	Alumni Hall; Annapolis, Maryland
January 4*	Penn	L 49–84	6–7	McAlister Field House; Charleston, South Carolina
January 7	Georgia Southern	L 65–83	6–8 (0–2)	McAlister Field House; Charleston, South Carolina
January 10	at Davidson	L 49–85	6–9 (0–3)	John M. Belk Arena; Davidson, North Carolina
January 14	at College of Charleston	L 65–77	6–10 (0–4)	John Kresse Arena; Charleston, South Carolina
January 16	Wofford	L 52–67	6–11 (0–5)	McAlister Field House; Charleston, South Carolina
January 21	at Furman	L 57–81	6–12 (0–6)	Timmons Arena; Greenville, South Carolina
January 23	at UNC Greensboro	L 46–65	6–13 (0–7)	Fleming Gymnasium; Greensboro, North Carolina
January 28	Appalachian State	L 65–66	6–14 (0–8)	McAlister Field House; Charleston, South Carolina
January 30	Chattanooga	L 64–74	6–15 (0–9)	McAlister Field House; Charleston, South Carolina
February 4	at Elon	L 62–73	6–16 (0–10)	Alumni Gym; Elon, North Carolina
February 7	Savannah State	W 80–73	7–16	McAlister Field House; Charleston, South Carolina
February 11	at Georgia Southern	L 68–96	7–17 (0–11)	Hanner Fieldhouse; Statesboro, Georgia
February 13	Davidson	L 77–81	7–18 (0–12)	McAlister Field House; Charleston, South Carolina
February 16	College of Charleston	L 52–72	7–19 (0–13)	McAlister Field House; Charleston, South Carolina
February 20	Furman	L 41–64	7–20 (0–14)	McAlister Field House; Charleston, South Carolina
February 22*	at Savannah State	W 70–61	8–20	Tiger Arena; Savannah, Georgia
February 25	at Wofford	W 84–80 ^{OT}	9–20 (1–14)	Benjamin Johnson Arena; Spartanburg, South Carolina
2006 Southern Conference men's basketball tournament
March 2	vs. Furman	W 65–53	10–20	North Charleston Coliseum; North Charleston, South Carolina
March 3	vs. Davidson	L 73–79	10–21	North Charleston Coliseum; North Charleston, South Carolina
*Non-conference game. (#) Tournament seedings in parentheses. All times are in Eastern Time.

== 2006–07 ==
2006–07 The Citadel Bulldogs men's basketball
- Conference: Southern Conference
- South Division
- Record: 7–23 (4–14 SoCon)
- Head coach: Ed Conroy
- Home arena: McAlister Field House

2006–07 Southern Conference men's basketball standings
	Conf.				Overall
Team	W		L	PCT	W		L	PCT
North
Appalachian State	15	–	3	.833	25	–	8	.758
UNC Greensboro	12	–	6	.667	16	–	14	.533
Western Carolina	7	–	11	.389	11	–	20	.355
Chattanooga	6	–	12	.333	15	–	18	.455
Elon	5	–	13	.278	7	–	23	.233
South
Davidson†	17	–	1	.944	29	–	5	.853
College of Charleston	13	–	5	.722	22	–	11	.667
Furman	8	–	10	.444	15	–	16	.484
Georgia Southern	7	–	11	.389	15	–	16	.484
Wofford	5	–	13	.278	10	–	20	.333
The Citadel	4	–	14	.222	7	–	23	.233
† SoCon Tournament winner As of April 30, 2007; Rankings from AP poll

Date time, TV	Opponent	Result	Record	Site city, state
November 10*	Ohio Valley	W 79–58	1–0	McAlister Field House; Charleston, South Carolina
November 12*	at Michigan State	L 41–73	1–1	Breslin Center; East Lansing, Michigan
November 13*	at Iowa	L 53–75	1–2	Carver–Hawkeye Arena; Iowa City, Iowa
November 16*	at Charleston Southern	L 63–72	1–3	North Charleston Coliseum; North Charleston, South Carolina
November 19*	at Notre Dame	L 50–74	1–4	Edmund P. Joyce Center; Notre Dame, Indiana
November 21*	at Southern California	L 47–74	1–5	Galen Center; Los Angeles, California
November 24*	at Asbury	W 81–60	2–5	McAlister Field House; Charleston, South Carolina
November 27*	South Carolina	L 59–74	2–6	McAlister Field House; Charleston, South Carolina
December 2*	Army	L 55–63	2–7	McAlister Field House; Charleston, South Carolina
December 4	Appalachian State	L 52–56	2–8 (0–1)	McAlister Field House; Charleston, South Carolina
December 18	at Western Carolina	L 63–82	2–9 (0–2)	Ramsey Center; Cullowhee, North Carolina
December 20*	at West Virginia	L 36–63	2–10	WVU Coliseum; Morgantown, West Virginia
December 30*	Atlanta Christian	W 113–59	3–10	McAlister Field House; Charleston, South Carolina
January 3	at Elon	W 53–50	4–10 (1–2)	Alumni Gym; Elon, North Carolina
January 6	at Wofford	W 74–71	5–10 (2–2)	Benjamin Johnson Arena; Spartanburg, South Carolina
January 8	College of Charleston	L 62–74	5–11 (2–3)	McAlister Field House; Charleston, South Carolina
January 13	Georgia Southern	W 74–69	6–11 (3–3)	McAlister Field House; Charleston, South Carolina
January 16	at Davidson	L 54–79	6–12 (3–4)	John M. Belk Arena; Davidson, North Carolina
January 20	UNC Greensboro	L 44–47	6–13 (3–5)	McAlister Field House; Charleston, South Carolina
January 22	at Furman	L 59–63	6–14 (3–6)	Timmons Arena; Greenville, South Carolina
January 27	at Appalachian State	L 54–95	6–15 (3–7)	Holmes Center; Boone, North Carolina
February 3	Western Carolina	L 68–78	6–16 (3–8)	McAlister Field House; Charleston, South Carolina
February 5	Elon	W 52–49	7–16 (4–8)	McAlister Field House; Charleston, South Carolina
February 10	at Chattanooga	L 43–73	7–17 (4–9)	McKenzie Arena; Chattanooga, Tennessee
February 12	Wofford	L 49–61	7–18 (4–10)	McAlister Field House; Charleston, South Carolina
February 17	Furman	L 51–69	7–19 (4–11)	McAlister Field House; Charleston, South Carolina
February 19	at Georgia Southern	L 62–81	7–20 (4–12)	Hanner Fieldhouse; Statesboro, Georgia
February 22	at College of Charleston	L 40–50	7–21 (4–13)	John Kresse Arena; Charleston, South Carolina
February 24	Davidson	L 70–87	7–22 (4–14)	McAlister Field House; Charleston, South Carolina
2007 Southern Conference men's basketball tournament
February 28	at Georgia Southern	L 46–62	7–23	North Charleston Coliseum; North Charleston, South Carolina
*Non-conference game. (#) Tournament seedings in parentheses. All times are in Eastern Time.

== 2007–08 ==
2007–08 The Citadel Bulldogs men's basketball
- Conference: Southern Conference
- South Division
- Record: 6–24 (1–19 SoCon)
- Head coach: Ed Conroy
- Home arena: McAlister Field House

2007–08 Southern Conference men's basketball standings
	Conf.				Overall
Team	W		L	PCT	W		L	PCT
North
Appalachian State	13	–	7	.650	18	–	13	.581
Chattanooga	13	–	7	.650	18	–	13	.581
UNC Greensboro	12	–	8	.600	19	–	12	.613
Elon	9	–	11	.450	14	–	19	.424
Western Carolina	6	–	14	.300	10	–	21	.323
South
No. 23 Davidson†	20	–	0	1.000	29	–	7	.806
Georgia Southern	13	–	7	.650	20	–	12	.625
College of Charleston	9	–	11	.450	16	–	17	.485
Wofford	8	–	12	.400	16	–	16	.500
Furman	6	–	14	.300	7	–	23	.233
The Citadel	1	–	19	.050	6	–	24	.200
† SoCon Tournament winner As of April 30, 2008; Rankings from AP poll

Date time, TV	Opponent	Result	Record	Site city, state
November 9*	Daniel Webster	W 131–79	1–0	McAlister Field House; Charleston, South Carolina
November 12*	at South Carolina	L 42–103	1–1	Colonial Life Arena; Columbia, South Carolina
November 15*	Southern California	L 47–74	1–2	McAlister Field House; Charleston, South Carolina
November 20*	at Penn	L 77–93	1–3	Palestra; Philadelphia
November 24*	Webber International	W 66–63	2–3	McAlister Field House; Charleston, South Carolina
November 26*	Charleston Southern	W 76–73	3–3	McAlister Field House; Charleston, South Carolina
December 1	at Chattanooga	L 74–87	3–4 (0–1)	McKenzie Arena; Chattanooga, Tennessee
December 13	at Davidson	L 74–95	3–5 (0–2)	John M. Belk Arena; Davidson, North Carolina
December 15*	Atlanta Christian	W 79–55	4–5	McAlister Field House; Charleston, South Carolina
December 20*	vs. No. 7 Washington State; Cougar Hardwood Classic	L 45–67	4–6	KeyArena; Seattle
December 31*	Cornell College	W 71–63	5–6	McAlister Field House; Charleston, South Carolina
January 3	Elon	L 63–72	5–7 (0–3)	McAlister Field House; Charleston, South Carolina
January 5	Appalachian State	L 50–63	5–8 (0–4)	McAlister Field House; Charleston, South Carolina
January 7	at UNC Greensboro	L 54–84	5–9 (0–5)	Greensboro Coliseum; Greensboro, North Carolina
January 12	Georgia Southern	L 52–73	5–10 (0–6)	McAlister Field House; Charleston, South Carolina
January 14	College of Charleston	L 46–69	5–11 (0–7)	McAlister Field House; Charleston, South Carolina
January 19	Wofford	L 76–80	5–12 (0–8)	McAlister Field House; Charleston, South Carolina
January 24	Davidson	L 70–87	5–13 (0–9)	McAlister Field House; Charleston, South Carolina
January 26	UNC Greensboro	L 63–74	5–14 (0–10)	McAlister Field House; Charleston, South Carolina
January 30	at Furman	L 51–53	5–15 (0–11)	Timmons Arena; Greenville, South Carolina
February 4	at College of Charleston	L 48–63	5–16 (0–12)	John Kresse Arena; Charleston, South Carolina
February 9	at Appalachian State	L 71–75 ^{OT}	5–17 (0–13)	Holmes Center; Boone, North Carolina
February 11	at Elon	L 51–65	5–18 (0–14)	Alumni Gym; Elon, North Carolina
February 14	Western Carolina	W 57–51	6–18 (1–14)	McAlister Field House; Charleston, South Carolina
February 16	Chattanooga	L 71–78	6–19 (1–15)	McAlister Field House; Charleston, South Carolina
February 20	at Georgia Southern	L 68–98	6–20 (1–16)	Hanner Fieldhouse; Statesboro, Georgia
February 23	at Western Carolina	L 42–61	6–21 (1–17)	Ramsey Center; Cullowhee, North Carolina
February 28	Furman	L 63–73	6–22 (1–18)	McAlister Field House; Charleston, South Carolina
March 1	at Wofford	L 77–91	6–23 (1–19)	Benjamin Johnson Arena; Spartanburg, South Carolina
2008 Southern Conference men's basketball tournament
March 7	vs. College of Charleston	L 48–66	6–24	North Charleston Coliseum; North Charleston, South Carolina
*Non-conference game. (#) Tournament seedings in parentheses. All times are in Eastern Time.

== 2008–09 ==
2008–09 The Citadel Bulldogs men's basketball
- Conference: Southern Conference
- South Division
- Record: 20–13 (15–5 SoCon)
- Head coach: Ed Conroy
- Home arena: McAlister Field House

2008–09 Southern Conference men's basketball standings
	Conf.				Overall
Team	W		L	PCT	W		L	PCT
North
Western Carolina	11	–	9	.550	16	–	15	.516
Chattanooga †	11	–	9	.550	18	–	17	.514
Samford	9	–	11	.450	16	–	16	.500
Appalachian State	9	–	11	.450	13	–	18	.419
Elon	7	–	13	.350	11	–	20	.355
UNC Greensboro	4	–	16	.200	5	–	25	.167
South
Davidson	18	–	2	.900	27	–	8	.771
The Citadel	15	–	5	.750	20	–	13	.606
Charleston	15	–	5	.750	27	–	9	.750
Wofford	12	–	8	.600	16	–	14	.533
Georgia Southern	5	–	15	.250	8	–	22	.267
Furman	4	–	16	.200	6	–	24	.200
† SoCon Tournament winner As of April 30, 2009; Rankings from AP Poll
