= 2003–04 Liberty Flames basketball team =

American college basketball season

2003–04 Liberty Flames men's basketball
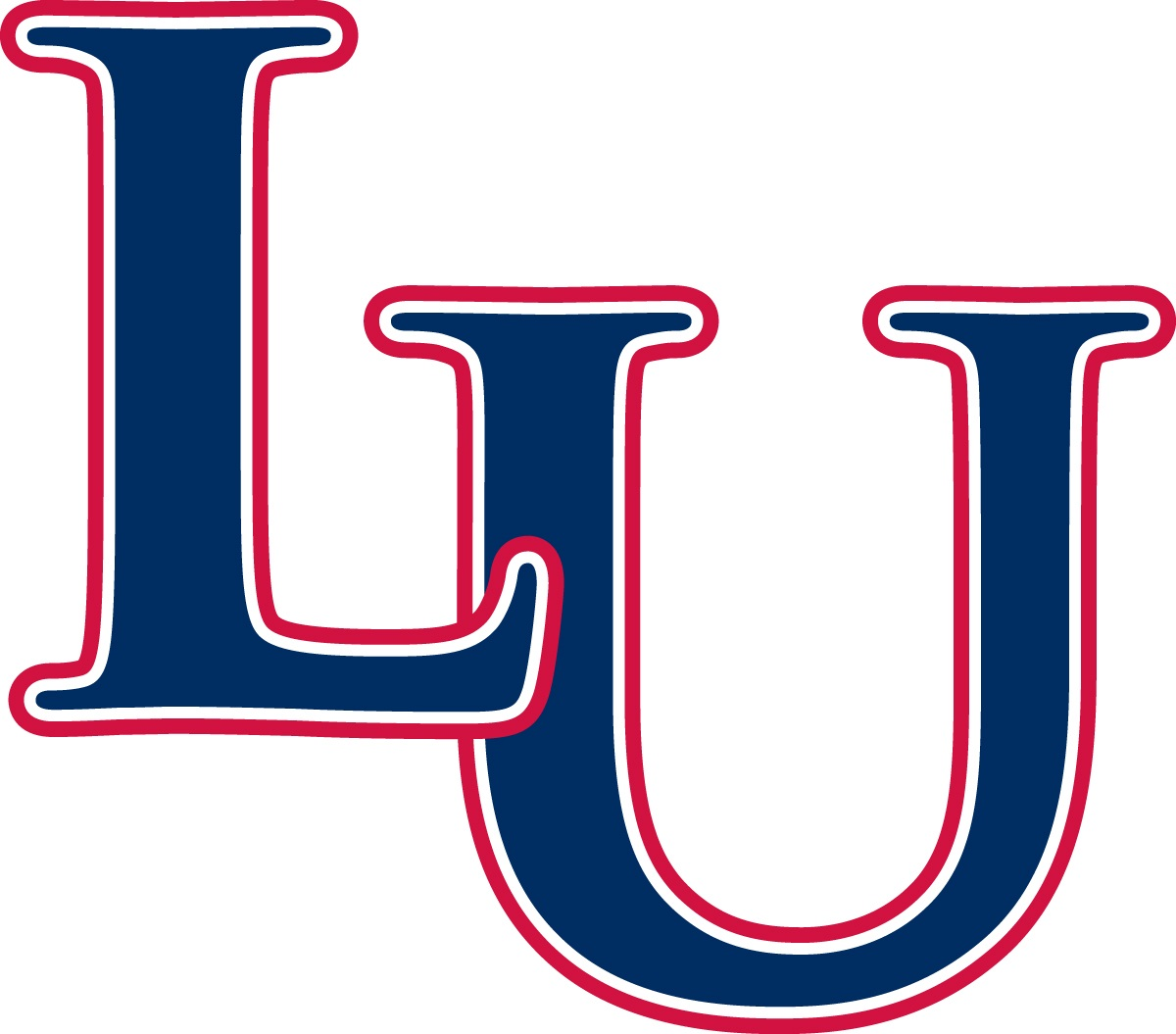

Big South tournament champions

NCAA tournament, First round
- Conference: Big South Conference
- Record: 18–15 (12–4 Big South)
- Head coach: Randy Dunton
- Home arena: Vines Center

2003–04 Big South Conference men's basketball standings
	Conf.				Overall
Team	W		L	PCT	W		L	PCT
Birmingham–Southern	12	–	4	.750	19	–	7	.731
Liberty †	12	–	4	.750	18	–	15	.545
High Point	10	–	6	.625	19	–	11	.633
Winthrop	10	–	6	.625	16	–	12	.571
Coastal Carolina	8	–	8	.500	14	–	15	.483
Radford	7	–	9	.438	12	–	16	.429
UNC Asheville	6	–	10	.375	9	–	20	.310
VMI	4	–	12	.250	6	–	22	.214
Charleston Southern	3	–	13	.188	6	–	22	.214
† 2004 Big South tournament winner Rankings from AP Poll

The 2003–04 Liberty Flames basketball team represented Liberty University during the 2003–04 NCAA Division I men's basketball season. The Flames, led by head coach Randy Dunton, played their home games at the Vines Center and were members of the North Division of the Big South Conference. The team finished atop the regular season standings, and won the Big South tournament to earn an automatic bid to the NCAA Tournament. Playing as the No. 16 seed in the East region, Liberty lost in the first round to No. 1 seed St. Joseph's, 82–63. The team finished the season with an 18–15 record (12–4 in the Big South).

== Roster ==
2003–04 Liberty Flames men's basketball team
Players	Coaches
Pos. / # / Name / Height / Weight / Year / Hometown; G / 5 / Gabe Martin / 6 ft 5 in (1.96 m) / 200 lb (91 kg) / Sr / Junction City, Kansas	Head coach: Randy Dunton; Assistant coach(es) Legend: (C) Team captain; (S) Suspended; (I) Ineligible; (W) Walk-on; Injured; Current redshirt; Roster

== Schedule ==
Date time, TV	Rank^{#}	Opponent^{#}	Result	Record	Site (attendance) city, state
Regular season
Nov 21, 2003*		Miami (OH)	L 55–71	0–1	Vines Center; Lynchburg, Virginia
Nov 23, 2003*		at William & Mary	L 64–91	0–2	Kaplan Arena; Williamsburg, Virginia
Nov 27, 2003*		vs. Canisius; Great Alaska Shootout	W 65–48	1–2	Sullivan Arena (7,705); Anchorage, Alaska
Nov 28, 2003*		vs. No. 2 Duke; Great Alaska Shootout	L 47–76	1–3	Sullivan Arena (8,430); Anchorage, Alaska
Nov 29, 2003*		vs. Seton Hall; Great Alaska Shootout	L 47–65	1–4	Sullivan Arena (8,700); Anchorage, Alaska
Dec 5, 2003*		Virginia Intermont	W 90–65	2–4	Vines Center; Lynchburg, Virginia
Dec 8, 2003*		Arkansas State	L 63–64	3–5	Vines Center; Lynchburg, Virginia
Dec 11, 2003*		Chattanooga	W 85–69	4–5	Vines Center; Lynchburg, Virginia
Dec 13, 2003*		at Iowa State	L 58–76	4–6	Hilton Coliseum; Ames, Iowa
Dec 18, 2003*		at Old Dominion	L 66–87	4–7	Chartway Arena; Norfolk, Virginia
Dec 28, 2003*		at No. 5 Arizona; Fiesta Bowl Classic	L 91–107	4–8	McKale Center; Tucson, Arizona
Dec 30, 2003*		vs. Valparaiso; Fiesta Bowl Classic	L 54–72	4–9	McKale Center; Tucson, Arizona
Jan 3, 2004		at Coastal Carolina	L 65–67	4–10 (0–1)	Kimbel Arena; Conway, South Carolina
Jan 5, 2004		at Charleston Southern	W 71–55	5–10 (1–1)	Buccaneer Field House; Charleston, South Carolina
Jan 8, 2004		UNC Asheville	W 84–72	6–10 (2–1)	Vines Center; Lynchburg, Virginia
Jan 10, 2004		High Point	W 79–66	7–10 (3–1)	Vines Center; Lynchburg, Virginia
Jan 14, 2004		at Radford	L 76–83	7–11 (3–2)	Dedmon Center; Radford, Virginia
Jan 20, 2004		VMI	W 66–46	8–11 (4–2)	Vines Center; Lynchburg, Virginia
Jan 22, 2004		at Birmingham–Southern	L 63–67	8–12 (4–3)	Bill Battle Coliseum; Birmingham, Alabama
Jan 29, 2004		Winthrop	W 66–50	9–12 (5–3)	Vines Center; Lynchburg, Virginia
Jan 31, 2004		at High Point	W 67–56	10–12 (6–3)	Millis Center; High Point, North Carolina
Feb 4, 2004		at UNC Asheville	W 82–68	11–12 (7–3)	Justice Center; Asheville, North Carolina
Feb 7, 2004		Coastal Carolina	W 79–65	12–12 (8–3)	Vines Center; Lynchburg, Virginia
Feb 9, 2004		Charleston Southern	W 71–67 ^{OT}	13–12 (9–3)	Vines Center; Lynchburg, Virginia
Feb 14, 2004		Birmingham–Southern	W 91–72	14–12 (10–3)	Vines Center; Lynchburg, Virginia
Feb 18, 2004		at Winthrop	W 74–62	15–12 (11–3)	Winthrop Coliseum; Rock Hill, South Carolina
Feb 21, 2004		at VMI	L 52–61	15–13 (11–4)	Cameron Hall; Lexington, Virginia
Feb 25, 2004*		at UNC Greensboro	L 63–74	15–14	Bodford Arena; Greensboro, North Carolina
Feb 28, 2004		Radford	W 50–49	16–14 (12–4)	Vines Center; Lynchburg, Virginia
Big South tournament
Mar 2, 2004*	(1)	(8) Charleston Southern; Quarterfinals	W 60–54	16–14	Vines Center (4,331); Lynchburg, Virginia
Mar 4, 2004*	(1)	(4) Coastal Carolina; Semifinals	W 88–73	17–14	Vines Center (6,411); Lynchburg, Virginia
Mar 6, 2004*	(1)	(2) High Point; Championship game	W 89–44	18–14	Vines Center (8,515); Lynchburg, Virginia
NCAA tournament
Mar 18, 2004*	(16 E)	vs. (1 E) No. 5 Saint Joseph's; First round	L 63–82	18–15	HSBC Arena (18,456); Buffalo, New York
*Non-conference game. ^{#}Rankings from AP Poll. (#) Tournament seedings in parentheses. All times are in Eastern Time. (#) during NCAA Tournament is seed with Region E=East.
