= VMI Keydets basketball, 2000–2007 =

== 1999–2000 ==
1999–2000 VMI Keydets men's basketball
- Conference: Southern Conference
- North Division
- Record: 6–23 (1–15 SoCon)
- Head coach: Bart Bellairs
- Home arena: Cameron Hall

1999–2000 Southern Conference men's basketball standings
	Conf.				Overall
Team	W		L	PCT	W		L	PCT
North
Appalachian State†	13	–	3	.813	23	–	9	.719
Davidson	10	–	6	.625	15	–	13	.536
UNC Greensboro	9	–	7	.563	15	–	13	.536
East Tennessee State	8	–	8	.500	14	–	15	.483
Western Carolina	7	–	9	.438	14	–	14	.500
VMI	1	–	15	.063	6	–	23	.207
South
College of Charleston	13	–	3	.813	24	–	6	.800
Georgia Southern	10	–	6	.625	16	–	12	.571
Wofford	8	–	8	.500	14	–	16	.467
Chattanooga	6	–	10	.375	10	–	19	.345
The Citadel	5	–	10	.333	9	–	20	.310
Furman	5	–	10	.333	14	–	18	.438
† SoCon Tournament winner As of April 30, 2000; Rankings from AP poll

Date time, TV	Opponent	Result	Record	Site city, state
November 18* no, no	Southern Virginia	W 99–73	1–0	Cameron Hall; Lexington, VA
November 20* no, no	Warren Wilson	W 85–38	2–0	Cameron Hall; Lexington, VA
November 21* no, no	at Virginia	L 57–98	2–1	John Paul Jones Arena; Charlottesville, VA
November 26* no, no	Oral Roberts	W 56–44	3–1	Cameron Hall; Lexington, VA
November 28* no, no	at Hawaii	L 61–78	3–2	Stan Sheriff Center; Honolulu, HI
December 1* no, no	Bluefield	W 82–76	4–2	Cameron Hall; Lexington, VA
December 2* no, no	Ferrum	W 97–65	5–2	Cameron Hall; Lexington, VA
December 6* no, no	Virginia Tech	L 46–65	5–3	Cameron Hall; Lexington, VA
December 8* no, no	Old Dominion	L 62–71	5–4	Cameron Hall; Lexington, VA
December 18* no, no	at Notre Dame	L 66–79	5–5	Edmund P. Joyce Center; Notre Dame, IN
December 21* no, no	at VCU	L 86–101	5–6	Siegel Center; Richmond, VA
December 28* no, no	at Florida	L 68–113	5–7	O'Connell Center; Gainesville, FL
January 4 no, no	at UNC Greensboro	L 71–82	5–8 (0–1)	Greensboro Coliseum; Greensboro, NC
January 8 no, no	Charleston	L 69–77	5–9 (0–2)	Cameron Hall; Lexington, VA
January 10 no, no	at Chattanooga	L 73–84	5–10 (0–3)	McKenzie Arena; Chattanooga, TN
January 15 no, no	The Citadel	L 84–87	5–11 (0–4)	Cameron Hall; Lexington, VA
January 17 no, no	at Appalachian State	L 72–97	5–12 (0–5)	Varsity Gymnasium; Boone, NC
January 22 no, no	at Davidson	L 69–80	5–13 (0–6)	John M. Belk Arena; Davidson, NC
January 24 no, no	UNC Greensboro	L 61–75	5–14 (0–7)	Cameron Hall; Lexington, VA
January 29 no, no	East Tennessee State	L 64–75	5–15 (0–8)	Cameron Hall; Lexington, VA
January 31 no, no	at Georgia Southern	L 67–69	5–16 (0–9)	Hanner Fieldhouse; Statesboro, GA
February 5 no, no	Western Carolina	L 82–85	5–17 (0–10)	Cameron Hall; Lexington, VA
February 7 no, no	at Wofford	L 69–83	5–18 (0–11)	Benjamin Johnson Arena; Spartanburg, SC
February 12 no, no	at East Tennessee State	L 60–72	5–19 (0–12)	Memorial Center; Johnson City, TN
February 14 no, no	Appalachian State	W 78–69	6–19 (1–12)	Cameron Hall; Lexington, VA
February 19 no, no	at Western Carolina	L 71–88	6–20 (1–13)	Ramsey Center; Cullowhee, NC
February 21 no, no	Davidson	L 58–71	6–21 (1–14)	Cameron Hall; Lexington, VA
February 26 no, no	Furman	L 68–71	6–22 (1–15)	Cameron Hall; Lexington, VA
2000 Southern Conference men's basketball tournament
March 2 no, no	vs. Wofford	L 72–81	6–23	BI-LO Center; Greenville, SC
*Non-conference game. (#) Tournament seedings in parentheses. All times are in Eastern Time.

== 2000–01 ==
2000–01 VMI Keydets men's basketball
- Conference: Southern Conference
- North Division
- Record: 9–19 (5–11 SoCon)
- Head coach: Bart Bellairs
- Home arena: Cameron Hall

2000–01 Southern Conference men's basketball standings
	Conf.				Overall
Team	W		L	PCT	W		L	PCT
North
East Tennessee State	13	–	3	.813	18	–	10	.643
UNC Greensboro †	10	–	6	.625	19	–	12	.613
Appalachian State	7	–	9	.438	11	–	20	.355
Davidson	7	–	9	.438	15	–	17	.469
VMI	5	–	11	.313	9	–	19	.321
Western Carolina	3	–	13	.188	6	–	25	.194
South
College of Charleston	12	–	4	.750	22	–	7	.759
Chattanooga	9	–	7	.563	17	–	13	.567
The Citadel	9	–	7	.563	16	–	12	.571
Georgia Southern	9	–	7	.563	15	–	15	.500
Wofford	7	–	9	.438	12	–	16	.429
Furman	5	–	11	.313	10	–	16	.385
† SoCon Tournament winner As of April 30, 2001; Rankings from AP poll

Date time, TV	Opponent	Result	Record	Site city, state
November 18* no, no	at Virginia Tech	L 68–92	0–1	Cassell Coliseum; Blacksburg, VA
November 20* no, no	at James Madison	L 69–87	0–2	JMU Convocation Center; Harrisonburg, VA
November 29* no, no	Howard	W 74–57	1–2	Cameron Hall; Lexington, VA
December 2* no, no	at Howard	L 88–91	1–3	Burr Gymnasium; Washington, D.C.
December 4* no, no	Virginia	L 70–89	1–4	Cameron Hall; Lexington, VA
December 6* no, no	Morehead State	L 48–57	1–5	Cameron Hall; Lexington, VA
December 16* no, no	at Old Dominion	L 81–89	1–6	Ted Constant Convocation Center; Norfolk, VA
December 18* no, no	Randolph–Macon	W 75–62	2–6	Cameron Hall; Lexington, VA
December 20* no, no	Mary Washington	W 77–47	3–6	Cameron Hall; Lexington, VA
December 28* no, no	at South Carolina	L 68–82	3–7	Carolina Coliseum; Columbia, SC
January 3 no, no	at Appalachian State	L 72–81	3–8 (0–1)	Holmes Center; Boone, NC
January 6 no, no	Western Carolina	W 70–69	4–8 (1–1)	Cameron Hall; Lexington, VA
January 10 no, no	at Furman	W 71–66	5–8 (2–1)	Timmons Arena; Greenville, SC
January 13 no, no	at The Citadel	L 64–79	5–9 (2–2)	McAlister Field House; Charleston, SC
January 15 no, no	UNC Greensboro	L 69–73	5–10 (2–3)	Cameron Hall; Lexington, VA
January 20 no, no	at Davidson	L 60–68	5–11 (2–4)	John M. Belk Arena; Davidson, NC
January 24 no, no	East Tennessee State	L 60–74	5–12 (2–5)	Cameron Hall; Lexington, VA
January 27 no, no	at Western Carolina	L 62–82	5–13 (2–6)	Ramsey Center; Cullowhee, NC
January 30 no, no	Davidson	L 67–70	5–14 (2–7)	Cameron Hall; Lexington, VA
February 3 no, no	Chattanooga	W 83–77	6–14 (3–7)	Cameron Hall; Lexington, VA
February 5 no, no	at UNC Greensboro	L 58–79	6–15 (3–8)	Greensboro Coliseum; Greensboro, NC
February 10 no, no	Wofford	W 68–60	7–15 (4–8)	Cameron Hall; Lexington, VA
February 12 no, no	Georgia Southern	L 73–78	7–16 (4–9)	Cameron Hall; Lexington, VA
February 15* no, no	at Charleston Southern	W 63–57	8–16	CSU Field House; North Charleston, SC
February 17 no, no	at Charleston	L 53–71	8–17 (4–10)	John Kresse Arena; Charleston, SC
February 21 no, no	at East Tennessee State	L 62–75	8–18 (4–11)	Memorial Center; Johnson City, TN
February 24 no, no	Appalachian State	W 73–51	9–18 (5–11)	Cameron Hall; Lexington, VA
2001 Southern Conference men's basketball tournament
March 1 no, no	vs. Georgia Southern	L 59–76	9–19	BI-LO Center; Greenville, SC
*Non-conference game. (#) Tournament seedings in parentheses. All times are in Eastern Time.

== 2001–02 ==
2001–02 VMI Keydets men's basketball
- Conference: Southern Conference
- North Division
- Record: 10–18 (5–11 SoCon)
- Head coach: Bart Bellairs
- Home arena: Cameron Hall

2001–02 Southern Conference men's basketball standings
	Conf.				Overall
Team	W		L	PCT	W		L	PCT
North
Davidson †	11	–	5	.688	21	–	10	.677
East Tennessee State	11	–	5	.688	18	–	10	.643
UNC Greensboro	11	–	5	.688	20	–	11	.645
Western Carolina	6	–	10	.375	12	–	16	.429
VMI	5	–	11	.313	10	–	18	.357
Appalachian State	5	–	11	.313	10	–	18	.357
South
Georgia Southern	9	–	7	.563	16	–	12	.571
Chattanooga	9	–	7	.563	16	–	14	.533
College of Charleston	9	–	7	.563	21	–	9	.700
The Citadel	8	–	8	.500	17	–	12	.586
Furman	7	–	9	.438	17	–	14	.548
Wofford	5	–	11	.313	11	–	18	.379
† SoCon Tournament winner As of March 19, 2002; Rankings from AP Poll

Date time, TV	Opponent	Result	Record	Site city, state
November 16* no, no	Mary Washington	W 76–51	1–0	Cameron Hall; Lexington, VA
November 28* no, no	at Morehead State	L 87–98	1–1	Ellis Johnson Arena; Morehead, KY
December 3* no, no	at Virginia Tech	L 73–74	1–2	Cassell Coliseum; Blacksburg, VA
December 5* no, no	at #11 Kentucky	L 57–99	1–3	Rupp Arena; Lexington, KY
December 8* no, no	St. Mary's (MD)	W 98–72	2–3	Cameron Hall; Lexington, VA
December 12* no, no	Charleston Southern	W 90–69	3–3	Cameron Hall; Lexington, VA
December 15* no, no	Eastern Mennonite	W 77–51	4–3	Cameron Hall; Lexington, VA
December 22* no, no	at Villanova	L 91–104	4–4	The Pavilion; Villanova, PA
December 28* no, no	at Richmond	W 82–80	5–4	Robins Center; Richmond, VA
December 29* no, no	vs. James Madison	L 84–94	5–5	Robins Center; Richmond, VA
January 2 no, no	Western Carolina	L 80–90	5–6 (0–1)	Cameron Hall; Lexington, VA
January 5 no, no	at Georgia Southern	L 60–100	5–7 (0–2)	Hanner Fieldhouse; Statesboro, GA
January 8 no, no	UNC Greensboro	L 74–80	5–8 (0–3)	Cameron Hall; Lexington, VA
January 12 no, no	at East Tennessee State	L 90–101	5–9 (0–4)	Memorial Center; Johnson City, TN
January 16 no, no	at Davidson	L 68–79	5–10 (0–5)	John M. Belk Arena; Davidson, NC
January 19 no, no	Charleston	L 55–63	5–11 (0–6)	Cameron Hall; Lexington, VA
January 21 no, no	at Appalachian State	W 93–91	6–11 (1–6)	Holmes Center; Boone, NC
January 24* no, no	at #7 Virginia	L 59–93	6–12	John Paul Jones Arena; Charlottesville, VA
January 26 no, no	Furman	W 76–68	7–12 (2–6)	Cameron Hall; Lexington, VA
January 30 no, no	East Tennessee State	L 77–96	7–13 (2–7)	Cameron Hall; Lexington, VA
February 2 no, no	at Wofford	L 68–78	7–14 (2–8)	Benjamin Johnson Arena; Spartanburg, SC
February 4 no, no	Appalachian State	W 88–81	8–14 (3–8)	Cameron Hall; Lexington, VA
February 9 no, no	at Western Carolina	W 97–91 ^{OT}	9–14 (4–8)	Ramsey Center; Cullowhee, NC
February 11 no, no	at Chattanooga	L 64–91	9–15 (4–9)	McKenzie Arena; Chattanooga, TN
February 16 no, no	at UNC Greensboro	L 71–74	9–16 (4–10)	Greensboro Coliseum; Greensboro, NC
February 18 no, no	The Citadel	L 55–75	9–17 (4–11)	Cameron Hall; Lexington, VA
February 23 no, no	Davidson	W 81–77	10–17 (5–11)	Cameron Hall; Lexington, VA
2002 Southern Conference men's basketball tournament
February 28 no, no	vs. The Citadel	L 70–80	10-18	North Charleston Coliseum; North Charleston, SC
*Non-conference game. (#) Tournament seedings in parentheses. All times are in Eastern Time.

== 2002–03 ==
2002–03 VMI Keydets men's basketball
- Conference: Southern Conference
- North Division
- Record: 10–20 (3–13 SoCon)
- Head coach: Bart Bellairs
- Home arena: Cameron Hall

2002–03 Southern Conference men's basketball standings
	Conf.				Overall
Team	W		L	PCT	W		L	PCT
North
Davidson	11	–	5	.688	17	–	10	.630
East Tennessee State †	11	–	5	.688	20	–	11	.645
Appalachian State	11	–	5	.688	19	–	10	.655
Western Carolina	6	–	10	.375	9	–	19	.321
VMI	3	–	13	.188	10	–	20	.333
UNC Greensboro	3	–	13	.188	7	–	22	.241
South
College of Charleston	13	–	3	.813	25	–	8	.758
Chattanooga	11	–	5	.688	21	–	9	.700
Georgia Southern	8	–	8	.500	16	–	13	.552
Wofford	8	–	8	.500	14	–	15	.483
Furman	8	–	8	.500	14	–	17	.452
The Citadel	3	–	13	.188	8	–	20	.286
† SoCon Tournament winner As of April 30, 2003; Rankings from AP poll

Date time, TV	Opponent	Result	Record	Site city, state
November 23* no, no	Liberty	W 68–54	1–0	Cameron Hall; Lexington, VA
November 25* no, no	at Tennessee	L 56–88	1–1	Thompson–Boling Arena; Knoxville, TN
December 1* no, no	at St. Francis	W 76–59	2–1	DeGol Arena; Loretto, PA
December 5* no, no	at Virginia Tech	L 66–71	2–2	Cassell Coliseum; Blacksburg, VA
December 7* no, no	UVA–Wise	W 77–66	3–2	Cameron Hall; Lexington, VA
December 10* no, no	at Liberty	L 69–77	3–3	Vines Center; Lynchburg, VA
December 14* no, no	Eastern Mennonite	W 100–57	4–3	Cameron Hall; Lexington, VA
December 20* no, no	Mary Washington	L 56–60	4–4	Cameron Hall; Lexington, VA
December 28* no, no	vs. Norfolk State	L 69–70	4–5	Robins Center; Richmond, VA
December 29* no, no	vs. Harvard	W 71–67	5–5	Robins Center; Richmond, VA
December 31* no, no	at Georgetown	L 48–85	5–6	Verizon Center; Washington, D.C.
January 5 no, no	at Western Carolina	W 78–56	5–7 (0–1)	Ramsey Center; Cullowhee, NC
January 11 no, no	Georgia Southern	L 84–91	5–8 (0–2)	Cameron Hall; Lexington, VA
January 13 no, no	at UNC Greensboro	L 57–76	5–9 (0–3)	Greensboro Coliseum; Greensboro, NC
January 18 no, no	East Tennessee State	L 62–67	5–10 (0–4)	Cameron Hall; Lexington, VA
January 21 no, no	Davidson	W 61–60	6–10 (1–4)	Cameron Hall; Lexington, VA
January 24 no, no	Appalachian State	L 68–85	6–11 (1–5)	Cameron Hall; Lexington, VA
January 27 no, no	at Davidson	L 56–81	6–12 (1–6)	John Kresse Arena; Charleston, SC
February 1 no, no	at Furman	L 55–61	6–13 (1–7)	Timmons Arena; Greenville, SC
February 4 no, no	at East Tennessee State	L 76–93	6–14 (1–8)	Memorial Center; Johnson City, TN
February 8 no, no	Wofford	L 93–94 ^{OT}	6–15 (1–9)	Cameron Hall; Lexington, VA
February 10 no, no	at Appalachian State	L 64–83	6–16 (1–10)	Holmes Center; Boone, NC
February 15 no, no	Western Carolina	L 58–61	6–17 (1–11)	Cameron Hall; Lexington, VA
February 18 no, no	Chattanooga	L 52–77	6–18 (1–12)	Cameron Hall; Lexington, VA
February 22 no, no	UNC Greensboro	W 61–60	7–18 (2–12)	Cameron Hall; Lexington, VA
February 24 no, no	at The Citadel	W 58–49	8–18 (3–12)	McAlister Field House; Charleston, SC
March 1 no, no	at Davidson	L 49–84	8–19 (3–13)	John M. Belk Arena; Davidson, NC
2003 Southern Conference men's basketball tournament
March 5 no, no	vs. Furman	W 62–56	9–19	North Charleston Coliseum; North Charleston, SC
March 6 no, no	vs. Davidson	W 66–60	10–19	North Charleston Coliseum; North Charleston, SC
March 7 no, no	vs. Chattanooga	L 58–77	10–20	North Charleston Coliseum; North Charleston, SC
*Non-conference game. (#) Tournament seedings in parentheses. All times are in Eastern Time.

== 2003–04 ==
2003–04 VMI Keydets men's basketball
- Conference: Southern Conference
- North Division
- Record: 6–22 (4–12 SoCon)
- Head coach: Bart Bellairs
- Home arena: Cameron Hall

2003–04 Big South Conference men's basketball standings
	Conf.				Overall
Team	W		L	PCT	W		L	PCT
Birmingham–Southern	12	–	4	.750	19	–	7	.731
Liberty †	12	–	4	.750	18	–	15	.545
High Point	10	–	6	.625	19	–	11	.633
Winthrop	10	–	6	.625	16	–	12	.571
Coastal Carolina	8	–	8	.500	14	–	15	.483
Radford	7	–	9	.438	12	–	16	.429
UNC Asheville	6	–	10	.375	9	–	20	.310
VMI	4	–	12	.250	6	–	22	.214
Charleston Southern	3	–	13	.188	6	–	22	.214
† 2004 Big South tournament winner Rankings from AP Poll

Date time, TV	Opponent	Result	Record	Site city, state
November 21* no, no	vs. Washington State; Top of the World Classic	L 46–66	0–1	Carlson Center; Fairbanks, AK
November 22* no, no	vs. UTSA; Top of the World CLassic	L 52–68	0–2	Carlson Center; Fairbanks, AK
November 23* no, no	vs. Binghamton; Top of the World Classic	L 63–72	0–3	Carlson Center; Fairbanks, AK
December 2* no, no	Southern Virginia	W 85–62	1–3	Cameron Hall; Lexington, VA
December 5* no, no	Virginia	L 56–78	1–4	Cameron Hall; Lexington, VA
December 10* no, no	at Virginia Tech	L 56–80	1–5	Cassell Coliseum; Blacksburg, VA
December 13* no, no	Eastern Mennonite	W 107–94	2–5	Cameron Hall; Lexington, VA
December 21* no, no	St. Francis	L 62–66	2–6	Cameron Hall; Lexington, VA
December 23* no, no	at #20 Louisville	L 56–107	2–7	Freedom Hall; Louisville, KY
December 29* no, no	at Old Dominion	L 52–74	2–8	Ted Constant Convocation Center; Norfolk, VA
January 3 no, no	at UNC Asheville	L 48–61	2–9 (0–1)	Justice Center; Asheville, NC
January 8 no, no	Radford	W 69–58	3–9 (1–1)	Cameron Hall; Lexington, VA
January 10 no, no	at Winthrop	L 62–78	3–10 (1–2)	Winthrop Coliseum; Rock Hill, SC
January 14 no, no	at High Point	L 57–78	3–11 (1–3)	Millis Center; High Point, NC
January 17 no, no	Birmingham–Southern	L 49–82	3–12 (1–4)	Cameron Hall; Lexington, VA
January 20 no, no	at Liberty	L 46–66	3–13 (1–5)	Vines Center; Lynchburg, VA
January 26 no, no	Coastal Carolina	L 32–49	3–14 (1–6)	Cameron Hall; Lexington, VA
January 28 no, no	Charleston Southern	W 53–50	4–14 (2–6)	Cameron Hall; Lexington, VA
January 31 no, no	Winthrop	W 68–61	5–14 (3–6)	Cameron Hall; Lexington, VA
February 4 no, no	at Radford	L 46–63	5–15 (3–7)	Dedmon Center; Radford, VA
February 9* no, no	at James Madison	L 65–76	5–16	JMU Convocation Center; Harrisonburg, VA
February 11 no, no	UNC Asheville	L 51–59	5–17 (3–8)	Cameron Hall; Lexington, VA
February 14 no, no	at Coastal Carolina	L 44–60	5–18 (3–9)	Kimbel Arena; Conway, SC
February 16 no, no	at Charleston Southern	L 49–64	5–19 (3–10)	CSU Field House; North Charleston, SC
February 21 no, no	Liberty	W 61–52	6–19 (4–10)	Cameron Hall; Lexington, VA
February 25 no, no	High Point	L 75–76	6–20 (4–11)	Cameron Hall; Lexington, VA
February 28 no, no	at Birmingham–Southern	L 55–67	6–21 (4–12)	Bill Battle Coliseum; Birmingham, AL
2004 Big South Conference men's basketball tournament
March 2 no, no	at High Point	L 43–75	6–22	Millis Center; High Point, NC
*Non-conference game. (#) Tournament seedings in parentheses. All times are in Eastern Time.

== 2004–05 ==
2004–05 VMI Keydets men's basketball
- Conference: Big South Conference
- Record: 9–18 (3–13 Big South)
- Head coach: Bart Bellairs
- Home arena: Cameron Hall

2004–05 Big South Conference men's basketball standings
	Conf.				Overall
Team	W		L	PCT	W		L	PCT
Winthrop †	15	–	1	.938	27	–	6	.818
Liberty	11	–	5	.688	13	–	15	.464
UNC Asheville	8	–	8	.500	11	–	17	.393
Birmingham–Southern	7	–	9	.438	16	–	14	.533
Charleston Southern	7	–	9	.438	13	–	17	.433
Radford	7	–	9	.438	12	–	16	.429
High Point	7	–	9	.438	13	–	18	.419
Coastal Carolina	7	–	9	.438	10	–	19	.345
VMI	3	–	13	.188	9	–	18	.333
† 2005 Big South tournament winner Rankings from AP Poll

Date time, TV	Opponent	Result	Record	Site city, state
November 22* no, no	Southern Virginia	W 71–33	1–0	Cameron Hall; Lexington, VA
November 28* no, no	at Navy	W 78–73	2–0	Alumni Hall; Annapolis, MD
December 1* no, no	at Old Dominion	L 38–86	2–1	Ted Constant Center; Norfolk, VA
December 4* no, no	Virginia Tech	W 72–68	3–1	Cameron Hall; Lexington, VA
December 8* no, no	at Longwood	W 69–64 ^{OT}	4–1	Willett Hall; Farmville, VA
December 11* no, no	Towson	L 69–84	4–2	Cameron Hall; Lexington, VA
December 13* no, no	Bluefield	W 77–70	5–2	Cameron Hall; Lexington, VA
December 28* no, no	at New Orleans	L 49–62	5–3	Lakefront Arena; New Orleans, LA
December 31* no, no	at Tulane	L 74–82	5–4	Devlin Fieldhouse; New Orleans, LA
January 5* no, no	at Loyola (MD)	L 69–70	5–5	Reitz Arena; Baltimore, MD
January 8 no, no	Charleston Southern	L 67–78	5–6 (0–1)	Cameron Hall; Lexington, VA
January 10 no, no	Coastal Carolina	L 68–79	5–7 (0–2)	Cameron Hall; Lexington, VA
January 15 no, no	at UNC Asheville	L 77–87	5–8 (0–3)	Justice Center; Asheville, NC
January 19 no, no	Radford	L 62–78	5–9 (0–4)	Cameron Hall; Lexington, VA
January 24 no, no	at Liberty	L 71–91	5–10 (0–5)	Vines Center; Lynchburg, VA
January 26 no, no	at High Point	L 72–88	5–11 (0–6)	Millis Center; High Point, NC
January 29 no, no	Birmingham–Southern	L 59–66	5–12 (0–7)	Cameron Hall; Lexington, VA
January 31 no, no	at Winthrop	L 44–69	5–13 (0–8)	Winthrop Coliseum; Rock Hill, SC
February 5 no, no	at Coastal Carolina	L 70–75	5–14 (0–9)	Kimbel Arena; Conway, SC
February 7 no, no	at Charleston Southern	L 50–56	5–15 (0–10)	CSU Field House; North Charleston, SC
February 10* no, no	Longwood	W 65–52	6–15	Cameron Hall; Lexington, VA
February 12 no, no	UNC Asheville	L 72–77	6–16 (0–11)	Cameron Hall; Lexington, VA
February 14 no, no	at Radford	W 67–54	7–16 (1–11)	Dedmon Center; Radford, VA
February 17 no, no	Liberty	W 73–67	8–16 (2–11)	Cameron Hall; Lexington, VA
February 19 no, no	at Birmingham–Southern	L 48–60	8–17 (2–12)	Bill Battle Coliseum; Birmingham, AL
February 23 no, no	Winthrop	L 48–63	8–18 (2–13)	Cameron Hall; Lexington, VA
February 26 no, no	High Point	W 69–61	9–18 (3–13)	Cameron Hall; Lexington, VA
*Non-conference game. (#) Tournament seedings in parentheses. All times are in Eastern Time.

== 2005–06 ==
2005–06 VMI Keydets men's basketball
- Conference: Big South Conference
- Record: 7–20 (2–14 Big South)
- Head coach: Duggar Baucom
- Assistant coaches: Daniel Willis; Jason Allison
- Home arena: Cameron Hall

2005–06 Big South Conference men's basketball standings
	Conf.				Overall
Team	W		L	PCT	W		L	PCT
Winthrop †	13	–	3	.813	23	–	8	.742
Birmingham–Southern	12	–	4	.750	19	–	9	.679
Coastal Carolina	12	–	4	.750	20	–	10	.667
Radford	9	–	7	.563	16	–	13	.552
High Point	8	–	8	.500	16	–	13	.552
Charleston Southern	7	–	9	.438	13	–	16	.448
UNC Asheville	6	–	10	.375	9	–	19	.321
Liberty	3	–	13	.188	7	–	23	.233
VMI	2	–	14	.125	7	–	20	.259
† 2006 Big South tournament winner Rankings from AP Poll

Date time, TV	Opponent	Result	Record	Site city, state
November 21* no, no	Army	L 49–53	0–1	Cameron Hall; Lexington, VA
November 23* no, no	at NC State	L 55–75	0–2	PNC Arena; Raleigh, NC
November 30* no, no	Old Dominion	L 62–77	0–3	Cameron Hall; Lexington, VA
December 2* no, no	UVA–Wise	W 80–50	1–3	Cameron Hall; Lexington, VA
December 5* no, no	Ferrum	W 97–74	2–3	Cameron Hall; Lexington, VA
December 8* no, no	at Army	W 72–63	3–4	Christl Arena; West Point, NY
December 10* no, no	Southern Virginia	W 105–59	4–4	Cameron Hall; Lexington, VA
December 21* no, no	at Towson	W 80–78	5–4	Towson Center; Towson, MD
December 29* no, no	Loyola (MD)	L 79–87	5–5	Cameron Hall; Lexington, VA
December 31* no, no	at No. 16 Maryland	L 68–99	5–6	Comcast Center; College Park, MD
January 5 no, no	Charleston Southern	L 73–76	5–7 (0–1)	Cameron Hall; Lexington, VA
January 7 no, no	Coastal Carolina	W 88–77	6–7 (1–1)	Cameron Hall; Lexington, VA
January 12 no, no	High Point	L 90–100	6–8 (1–2)	Cameron Hall; Lexington, VA
January 14 no, no	Liberty	W 84–68	7–8 (2–2)	Cameron Hall; Lexington, VA
January 18 no, no	at Birmingham–Southern	L 53–75	7–9 (2–3)	Bill Battle Coliseum; Birmingham, AL
January 21 no, no	at UNC Asheville	L 65–83	7–10 (2–4)	Justice Center; Asheville, NC
January 26 no, no	at Radford	L 77–101	7–11 (2–5)	Dedmon Center; Radford, VA
January 30 no, no	Winthrop	L 69–74	7–12 (2–6)	Cameron Hall; Lexington, VA
February 2 no, no	at Liberty	L 67–71	7–13 (2–7)	Vines Center; Lynchburg, VA
February 4 no, no	Birmingham–Southern	L 59–74	7–14 (2–8)	Cameron Hall; Lexington, VA
February 8 no, no	at Winthrop	L 65–98	7–15 (2–9)	Winthrop Coliseum; Rock Hill, SC
February 11 no, no	UNC Asheville	L 74–82	7–16 (2–10)	Cameron Hall; Lexington, VA
February 15 no, no	at High Point	L 72–73	7–17 (2–11)	Millis Center; High Point, NC
February 18 no, no	at Charleston Southern	L 48–59	7–18 (2–12)	CSU Field House; North Charleston, SC
February 20 no, no	at Coastal Carolina	L 63–76	7–19 (2–13)	Kimbel Arena; Conway, SC
February 23 no, no	Radford	L 69–77	7–20 (2–14)	Cameron Hall; Lexington, VA
*Non-conference game. (#) Tournament seedings in parentheses. All times are in Eastern Time.

== 2006–07 ==
2006–07 VMI Keydets men's basketball
- Conference: Big South Conference
- Record: 14–19 (5–9 Big South)
- Head coach: Duggar Baucom
- Assistant coaches: Daniel Willis; Jason Allison
- Home arena: Cameron Hall

2006–07 Big South Conference men's basketball standings
	Conf.				Overall
Team	W		L	PCT	W		L	PCT
No. 22 Winthrop †	14	–	0	1.000	29	–	5	.853
High Point	11	–	3	.786	22	–	10	.688
Liberty	8	–	6	.571	14	–	17	.452
UNC Asheville	6	–	8	.429	12	–	19	.387
Coastal Carolina	7	–	7	.500	15	–	15	.500
VMI	5	–	9	.357	14	–	19	.424
Radford	3	–	11	.214	8	–	22	.267
Charleston Southern	2	–	12	.143	8	–	22	.267
† 2007 Big South tournament winner Rankings from AP Poll

Date time, TV	Opponent	Result	Record	Site city, state
November 10* no, no	at #7 Ohio State; BCA Classic	L 69–107	0–1	Value City Arena; Columbus, OH
November 11* no, no	vs. Princeton; BCA Classic	L 68–73	0–2	Value City Arena; Columbus, OH
November 12* no, no	vs. South Dakota State; BCA Classic	W 104–89	1–2	Value City Arena; Columbus, OH
November 15* no, no	Virginia Intermont	W 156–95	2–2	Cameron Hall; Lexington, VA
November 20* no, no	Southern Virginia	W 144–127	3–2	Cameron Hall; Lexington, VA
November 22* no, no	at James Madison	L 87–89	3–3	JMU Convocation Center; Harrisonburg, VA
November 25* no, no	at Howard	L 111–116	3–4	Burr Gymnasium; Washington, D.C.
November 28* no, no	at Army	L 72–79	3–5	Christl Arena; West Point, NY
December 1* no, no	vs. Cornell; William & Mary Tip-Off Classic	L 94–99	3–6	Kaplan Arena; Williamsburg, VA
December 2* no, no	vs. Jacksonville State; William & Mary Tip-Off Classic	L 85–87	3–7	Kaplan Arena; Williamsburg, VA
December 6* no, no	Lees–McRae	W 135–75	4–7	Cameron Hall; Lexington, VA
December 9* no, no	Mercer	L 103–105	4–8	Cameron Hall; Lexington, VA
December 11* no, no	South Carolina State	W 99–87	5–8	Cameron Hall; Lexington, VA
December 20* no, no	at Richmond	W 93–84	6–8	Robins Center; Richmond, VA
December 30* no, no	at Penn State	L 111–129	6–9	Bryce Jordan Center; University Park, PA
January 6 no, no	at Winthrop	L 76–108	6–10 (0–1)	Winthrop Coliseum; Rock Hill, SC
January 10 no, no	High Point	L 104–115	6–11 (0–2)	Cameron Hall; Lexington, VA
January 13 no, no	Charleston Southern	W 116–83	7–11 (1–2)	Cameron Hall; Lexington, VA
January 15 no, no	Coastal Carolina	L 97–99	7–12 (1–3)	Cameron Hall; Lexington, VA
January 18* no, no	Bridgewater	W 125–95	8–12	Cameron Hall; Lexington, VA
January 22 no, no	at UNC Asheville	W 102–97	9–12 (2–3)	Justice Center; Asheville, NC
January 25 no, no	Radford	W 103–94	10–12 (3–3)	Cameron Hall; Lexington, VA
January 27 no, no	at Liberty	L 117–122	10–13 (3–4)	Vines Center; Lynchburg, VA
January 31 no, no	Winthrop	L 96–109	10–14 (3–5)	Cameron Hall; Lexington, VA
February 3 no, no	at Coastal Carolina	L 99–108	10–15 (3–6)	Kimbel Arena; Conway, SC
February 5 no, no	at Charleston Southern	W 105–97	11–15 (4–6)	Cameron Hall; Lexington, VA
February 10 no, no	UNC Asheville	W 102–88	12–15 (5–6)	Cameron Hall; Lexington, VA
February 14 no, no	at Radford	L 107–114	12–16 (5–7)	Dedmon Center; Radford, VA
February 21 no, no	Liberty	L 108–118	12–17 (5–8)	Cameron Hall; Lexington, VA
February 24 no, no	at High Point	L 92–109	12–17 (5–9)	Millis Center; High Point, NC
2007 Big South Conference men's basketball tournament
February 27 no, no	at Liberty	W 79–78	13–18	Vines Center; Lynchburg, VA
March 1 no, no	vs. High Point	W 91–81	14–18	Winthrop Coliseum; Rock Hill, SC
March 3 no, no	at Winthrop	L 81–84	14–19	Winthrop Coliseum; Rock Hill, SC
*Non-conference game. (#) Tournament seedings in parentheses. All times are in Eastern Time.
