= List of The Citadel Bulldogs head basketball coaches =

The Citadel Bulldogs basketball program is a college basketball team that represents The Citadel, The Military College of South Carolina in the Southern Conference. The Bulldogs compete in the National Collegiate Athletic Association (NCAA) Division I.

The Bulldogs have had 31 head coaches, with Pat Dennis serving the longest at 14 seasons. Dennis also coached the most games, at 391. J. G. Briggs, the first head coach at The Citadel, coached the fewest games at five. Darl Buse, the second head coach, recorded the highest winning percentage at .857. Jim Browning recorded the lowest winning percentage, .053, in 1954–55.

The Citadel has won one conference championship, the 1927 Southern Intercollegiate Athletic Association Tournament. In 2009, the Bulldogs participated in their only postseason event, the 2009 CollegeInsider.com Tournament, losing in the first round under Ed Conroy

== Key ==
General
#	Number of coaches (Note: A running total of the number of coaches of the Buldogs. Thus, any coach who has two or more separate terms as head coach is counted only once.)
CCs	Conference championships
*	Conference tournament champion

Overall
GC	Games coached
OW	Wins
OL	Losses
OT	Ties
O%	Winning percentage

Conference
CW	Wins
CL	Losses
C%	Winning percentage

Post-season
PW	Wins
PL	Losses

== Coaches ==
List of head basketball coaches showing season(s) coached, overall records, conference records, postseason records, championships and selected awards (Note: Statistics correct as of the end of the 2011–12 college basketball season.)
#	Name	Term	GC	OW	OL	O%	CW	CL	C%	PW	PL	CCs	Awards
1	Not Available	1900–1901	1	0	1	.000	—	—	—	—	—	—	—
2	J. G. Briggs	1912–1913	5	2	3	.400	—	—	—	—	—	—	—
3	Darl Buse	1913–1914	7	6	1	.857	—	—	—	—	—	—	—
4	Hans Kengeter	1914–1916	13	9	4	.692	—	—	—	—	—	—	—
5	Harry J. O'Brien	1916–1918	8	7	2	.778	—	—	—	—	—	—	—
6	C. F. Myers	1918–1925	80	53	27	.663	7	9	.438	—	—	—	—
7	Locke Brown	1925–1926	15	9	6	.600	4	1	.800	—	—	1*	—
8	Benny Blatt	1926–1930	74	52	22	.703	8	4	.667	—	—	—	—
9	Johnny Douglas	1930–1933	49	18	31	.367	1	3	.250	—	—	—	—
10	Charlie Willard	1933–1935	29	13	16	.448	0	0	.000	—	—	—	—
11	Rock Norman	1935–1940	75	44	31	.587	17	16	.515	—	—	—	—
12	Ben Parker	1939–1941	24	7	17	.292	4	11	.267	—	—	—	—
13	Ben Clemons	1941–1942, 1943–44	21	4	17	.190	1	13	.071	—	—	—	—
14	Bo Sherman	1942–1943	12	8	4	.667	5	3	.625	—	—	—	—
15	Ernest Wehman	1944–45	14	9	5	.643	8	4	.667	—	—	—	—
16	Eugene Clark	1945–1946	18	8	10	.444	2	6	.250	—	—	—	—
17	Whitey Piro	1946–1947	15	4	11	.267	0	10	.000	—	—	—	—
18	Bernard O'Neil	1947–1952	99	27	72	.273	9	47	.161	—	—	—	—
19	Leo Zack	1952–1954	38	6	32	.158	1	18	.053	—	—	—	—
20	Jim Browning	1954–1955	19	1	18	.053	0	10	.000	—	—	—	—
21	Hank Witt	1955–1956	21	2	19	.095	0	10	.000	—	—	—	—
22	Norm Sloan	1956–1960	95	57	38	.600	29	23	.558	—	—	—	1957 - SoCon Coach of the Year (Media)
23	Mel Thompson	1960–1967	164	67	98	.406	38	53	.418	—	—	—	—
24	Dick Campbell	1967–1971	99	45	54	.455	21	27	.438	—	—	—	—
25	George Hill	1971–1974	75	33	42	.440	15	22	.405	—	—	—	—
26	Les Robinson	1974–1985	294	132	162	.449	61	99	.381	—	—	—	1979 - SoCon Coach of the Year (Media)
27	Randy Nesbit	1985–1992	196	75	121	.383	32	72	.308	—	—	—	1988 - SoCon Coach of the Year (Coaches); 1989 - SoCon Coach of the Year (Media)
28	Pat Dennis	1992–2006	390	157	233	.403	72	146	.330	—	—	—	—
29	Ed Conroy	2006–2010, 2022–present	250	86	164	.344	43	104	.293	—	1	—	2009 - Skip Prosser Man of the Year Award, NABC District 22 Coach of the Year, SoCon Coach of the Year (Coaches, Media, Collegeinsider.com)
30	Chuck Driesell	2010–2015	155	42	113	.271	22	65	.253	—	—	—	—
31	Duggar Baucom	2015–present	182	77	136	.362	27	97	.218	—	—	—	—
