= 2000–01 UNC Greensboro Spartans men's basketball team =

American college basketball season

2000–01 UNC Greensboro Spartans men's basketball

SoCon tournament champions

NCAA tournament
- Conference: Southern Conference
- North
- Record: 19–12 (10–6 SoCon)
- Head coach: Fran McCaffery (2nd season)
- Assistant coach: Billy Taylor (2nd season)
- Home arena: Greensboro Coliseum

2000–01 Southern Conference men's basketball standings
	Conf.				Overall
Team	W		L	PCT	W		L	PCT
North
East Tennessee State	13	–	3	.813	18	–	10	.643
UNC Greensboro †	10	–	6	.625	19	–	12	.613
Appalachian State	7	–	9	.438	11	–	20	.355
Davidson	7	–	9	.438	15	–	17	.469
VMI	5	–	11	.313	9	–	19	.321
Western Carolina	3	–	13	.188	6	–	25	.194
South
College of Charleston	12	–	4	.750	22	–	7	.759
Chattanooga	9	–	7	.563	17	–	13	.567
The Citadel	9	–	7	.563	16	–	12	.571
Georgia Southern	9	–	7	.563	15	–	15	.500
Wofford	7	–	9	.438	12	–	16	.429
Furman	5	–	11	.313	10	–	16	.385
† SoCon Tournament winner As of April 30, 2001; Rankings from AP poll

The 2000–01 UNC Greensboro Spartans men's basketball team represented the University of North Carolina at Greensboro during the 2000–01 NCAA Division I men's basketball season. The Spartans were led by second-year head coach, Fran McCaffery and played its home games at Greensboro Coliseum as members of the North Division of the Southern Conference. They finished the season 19–12, 10–6 in SoCon play to finished second in the North Division. They won the Southern Conference tournament to earn the conference's automatic bid to the NCAA tournament. Playing as the No. 16 seed in the West region, the Spartans were beaten by No. 1 seed Stanford, 89–60.

== Roster ==
2000–01 UNC Greensboro Spartans men's basketball team
Players	Coaches
Pos. / # / Name / Height / Weight / Year / Hometown; G / 23 / Courtney Eldridge / 5 ft 10 in (1.78 m) / — / Jr	Head coach: Fran McCaffery; Assistant coach(es): Billy Taylor; Legend: (C) Team captain; (S) Suspended; (I) Ineligible; (W) Walk-on; Injured; Current redshirt

== Schedule and results ==
Date time, TV	Rank^{#}	Opponent^{#}	Result	Record	Site (attendance) city, state
Regular Season
Nov 17, 2000*		at Minnesota	L 61–81	0–1	Williams Arena; Minneapolis, Minnesota
Nov 25, 2000*		at West Virginia	L 71–85	1–2	WVU Coliseum; Morgantown, West Virginia
Dec 5, 2000*		at NC State	L 76–77	2–4	RBC Center; Raleigh, North Carolina
Southern Conference tournament
Mar 2, 2001*		vs. Western Carolina; Quarterfinals	W 91–69	17–11	BI-LO Center; Greenville, South Carolina
Mar 3, 2001*		vs. Davidson; Semifinals	W 73–68	18–11	BI-LO Center; Greenville, South Carolina
Mar 4, 2001*		vs. Chattanooga; Championship game	W 67–66	19–11	BI-LO Center; Greenville, South Carolina
NCAA tournament
Mar 15, 2001*	(16 W)	vs. (1 W) No. 2 Stanford; First round	L 60–89	19–12	Cox Arena; San Diego, California
*Non-conference game. ^{#}Rankings from AP Poll. (#) Tournament seedings in parentheses. W=West. All times are in Eastern Time.
