= 2006 Southern Conference men's basketball tournament =

- Classification: Division I
- Season: 2005–06
- Teams: 11
- Site: North Charleston Coliseum; North Charleston, South Carolina
- Champions: Davidson (8th title)
- Winning coach: Bob McKillop (3rd title)
- MVP: Brendan Winters (Davidson)
- Top scorer: D.J. Thompson (Appalachian State) (63 points)

2005–06 Southern Conference men's basketball standings
	Conf.				Overall
Team	W		L	PCT	W		L	PCT
North
Elon	10	–	4	.714	15	–	14	.517
Chattanooga	8	–	6	.571	19	–	13	.594
Western Carolina	7	–	7	.500	13	–	17	.433
Appalachian State	6	–	8	.429	14	–	16	.467
UNC Greensboro	4	–	10	.286	12	–	19	.387
South
Georgia Southern	11	–	4	.733	20	–	10	.667
Davidson†	10	–	5	.667	20	–	11	.645
College of Charleston	9	–	6	.600	17	–	11	.607
Furman	8	–	7	.533	15	–	13	.536
Wofford	6	–	9	.400	11	–	18	.379
The Citadel	1	–	14	.067	10	–	21	.323
† SoCon Tournament winner As of April 30, 2006; Rankings from AP poll

The 2006 Southern Conference men's basketball tournament took place from March 2–5, 2006 at the North Charleston Coliseum in North Charleston, South Carolina. The #3 seed Davidson Wildcats defeated the Chattanooga Mocs in the championship game to win their 8th title and receive the automatic berth to the 2006 NCAA tournament.

== Format ==
All eleven teams were eligible for the tournament. The tournament used a preset bracket consisting of four rounds, the first of which featured three games, with the winners moving on to the quarterfinal round. The fourth and fifth seeds also received automatic byes to the quarterfinal round and played each other.

== Bracket ==
First round March 2
8	Appalachian State	66
9	Wofford	65
7	Western Carolina	65
10	UNC Greensboro	69
6	Furman	53
11	The Citadel	65

Quarterfinals; March 3
1	Georgia Southern	61
8	Appalachian State	74
4	College of Charleston	63
5	Chattanooga	65
2	Elon	64
10	UNC Greensboro	61
3	Davidson	79
11	The Citadel	73

Semifinals; March 4
5	Chattanooga	78
8	Appalachian State	75
2	Elon	58
3	Davidson	65

Championship Game; March 5
3	Davidson	80
5	Chattanooga	55

* Overtime game

== See also ==
- List of Southern Conference men's basketball champions
