= 2005–06 Davidson Wildcats men's basketball team =

American college basketball season

2005–06 Davidson Wildcats men's basketball

SoCon tournament champions SoCon regular season champions

NCAA tournament, first round
- Conference: Southern Conference
- South
- Record: 20–11 (10–5 SoCon)
- Head coach: Bob McKillop (17th season)
- Assistant coaches: Matt Matheny; Jim Fox; Tim Sweeney
- Home arena: John M. Belk Arena

2005–06 Southern Conference men's basketball standings
	Conf.				Overall
Team	W		L	PCT	W		L	PCT
North
Elon	10	–	4	.714	15	–	14	.517
Chattanooga	8	–	6	.571	19	–	13	.594
Western Carolina	7	–	7	.500	13	–	17	.433
Appalachian State	6	–	8	.429	14	–	16	.467
UNC Greensboro	4	–	10	.286	12	–	19	.387
South
Georgia Southern	11	–	4	.733	20	–	10	.667
Davidson†	10	–	5	.667	20	–	11	.645
College of Charleston	9	–	6	.600	17	–	11	.607
Furman	8	–	7	.533	15	–	13	.536
Wofford	6	–	9	.400	11	–	18	.379
The Citadel	1	–	14	.067	10	–	21	.323
† SoCon Tournament winner As of April 30, 2006; Rankings from AP poll

The 2005–06 Davidson Wildcats men's basketball team represented Davidson College in NCAA men's Division I competition during the 2005–06 NCAA Division I men's basketball season. Coached by Bob McKillop, the Wildcats finished second in the Southern Conference regular season standings and won the SoCon tournament title, and reached the 2006 NCAA Division I men's basketball tournament. The team finished with an overall record of 20–11 (10–5 SoCon).

== Roster ==
2005–06 Davidson Wildcats men's basketball team
Players
Coaches

Pos.	#	Name	Height	Weight	Year	Hometown
G	2	Jason Richards	6 ft 2 in (1.88 m)	190 lb (86 kg)	So	Barrington, IL
F	5	Boris Meno	6 ft 8 in (2.03 m)	220 lb (100 kg)	So	Paris, France
G	12	Can Civi	6 ft 1 in (1.85 m)	180 lb (82 kg)	Fr	Istanbul, Turkey
G	14	Max Paulhus Gosselin	6 ft 6 in (1.98 m)	195 lb (88 kg)	Fr	Carignan, QC, Canada
F	15	Thomas Sander	6 ft 8 in (2.03 m)	220 lb (100 kg)	So	Cincinnati, OH
G	20	Lamar Hull	5 ft 9 in (1.75 m)	165 lb (75 kg)	Jr	Maiden, NC
G	25	John Falconi	6 ft 4 in (1.93 m)	205 lb (93 kg)	Jr	Cincinnati, OH
G	32	Brendan Winters	6 ft 5 in (1.96 m)	205 lb (93 kg)	Sr	Denver, CO
F	41	Andrew Lovedale	6 ft 8 in (2.03 m)	215 lb (98 kg)	Fr	Benin City, Nigeria

Head coach

- Bob McKillop (Hofstra)

Assistant coach(es)

- Matt Matheny (Davidson)
- Jim Fox (Geneseo State)
- Tim Sweeney (Rochester)

Legend

- (C) Team captain
- (S) Suspended
- (I) Ineligible
- (W) Walk-on
- Injured
- Current redshirt

Roster

== Schedule and results ==
Date time, TV	Rank^{#}	Opponent^{#}	Result	Record	Site city, state
Regular season
Nov 19, 2005*; 5:00 p.m., ESPN2		at No. 1 Duke	L 55–84	0–1	Cameron Indoor Stadium (9,314); Durham, North Carolina
Nov 22, 2005*; 7:00 p.m.		UMass	W 66–63	1–1	John M. Belk Arena (3,084); Davidson, North Carolina
Nov 26, 2005*; 2:30 p.m.		Saint Joseph's	W 100–94 ^{OT}	2–1	John M. Belk Arena (3,544); Davidson, North Carolina
Nov 30, 2005*; 8:15 p.m.		at Charlotte	L 81–85 ^{OT}	2–2	Dale F. Halton Arena (7,331); Charlotte, North Carolina
Dec 3, 2005; 7:00 p.m.		at Appalachian State	W 102–69	3–2 (1–0)	Holmes Center (2,653); Boone, North Carolina
Dec 7, 2005*; 8:00 p.m.		Missouri	W 82–73	4–2	John M. Belk Arena (4,221); Davidson, North Carolina
Dec 10, 2005*; 7:00 p.m.		Catholic University	W 80–56	5–2	John M. Belk Arena (2,272); Davidson, North Carolina
Dec 15, 2005*; 7:00 p.m.		St. Mary's (MD)	W 112–59	6–2	John M. Belk Arena (2,023); Davidson, North Carolina
Dec 18, 2005*; 1:00 p.m.		at Syracuse	L 80–90	6–3	Carrier Dome (16,171); Syracuse, New York
Dec 21, 2005*; 7:00 p.m.		Clark (MA)	W 108–57	7–3	John M. Belk Arena (2,160); Davidson, North Carolina
Dec 29, 2005*; 8:00 p.m.		at Illinois–Chicago	L 67–76	7–4	Credit Union 1 Arena (3,648); Chicago, Illinois
Jan 3, 2006*; 7:00 p.m.		at No. 25 North Carolina	L 58–82	7–5	Dean Smith Center (18,334); Chapel Hill, North Carolina
Jan 7, 2006; 7:00 p.m.		Wofford	W 80–62	8–5 (2–0)	John M. Belk Arena (3,078); Davidson, North Carolina
Jan 10, 2006; 7:00 p.m.		The Citadel	W 85–49	9–5 (3–0)	John M. Belk Arena (2,241); Davidson, North Carolina
Jan 14, 2006; 2:00 p.m.		at Furman	L 66–70	9–6 (3–1)	Timmons Arena (3,283); Greenville, South Carolina
Jan 17, 2006; 7:00 p.m.		at College of Charleston	W 80–70	10–6 (4–1)	John Kresse Arena (3,708); Charleston, South Carolina
Jan 21, 2006; 2:00 p.m.		Georgia Southern	W 83–58	11–6 (5–1)	John M. Belk Arena (3,684); Davidson, North Carolina
Jan 23, 2006; 7:00 p.m.		at Chattanooga	L 59–65	11–7 (5–2)	McKenzie Arena (3,459); Chattanooga, Tennessee
Jan 27, 2006; 7:00 p.m.		Elon	W 79–60	12–7 (6–2)	John M. Belk Arena (3,708); Davidson, North Carolina
Jan 29, 2006*; 7:00 p.m.		Princeton	W 65–50	13–7	John M. Belk Arena (3,517); Davidson, North Carolina
Feb 4, 2006; 1:00 p.m.		Western Carolina	L 70–77	13–8 (6–3)	John M. Belk Arena (2,839); Davidson, North Carolina
Feb 8, 2006; 7:00 p.m.		UNC Greensboro	W 92–73	14–8 (7–3)	John M. Belk Arena (2,412); Davidson, North Carolina
Feb 11, 2006; 7:00 p.m.		at Wofford	L 71–84	14–9 (7–4)	Benjamin Johnson Arena (1,089); Spartanburg, South Carolina
Feb 13, 2006; 7:15 p.m.		at The Citadel	W 81–77	15–9 (8–4)	McAlister Field House (1,565); Charleston, South Carolina
Feb 18, 2006; 2:00 p.m.		Furman	W 77–59	16–9 (9–4)	John M. Belk Arena (3,208); Davidson, North Carolina
Feb 21, 2006; 7:30 p.m.		at Georgia Southern	L 73–76	16–10 (9–5)	Hanner Fieldhouse (4,005); Statesboro, Georgia
Feb 25, 2006; 12:00 p.m.		College of Charleston	W 65–63	17–10 (10–5)	John M. Belk Arena (3,228); Davidson, North Carolina
SoCon Tournament
Mar 3, 2006*; 8:30 p.m.	(3)	vs. (11) The Citadel; Quarterfinals	W 79–73	18–10	North Charleston Coliseum (5,081); North Charleston, South Carolina
Mar 4, 2006*; 2:30 p.m.	(3)	vs. (2) Elon; Semifinals	W 65–58	19–10	North Charleston Coliseum (3,370); North Charleston, South Carolina
Mar 5, 2006*; 2:00 p.m.	(3)	vs. (5) Chattanooga; Championship	W 80–55	20–10	North Charleston Coliseum (2,884); North Charleston, South Carolina
NCAA Tournament
Mar 17, 2006*; 12:15 p.m., CBS	(15 MSP)	vs. (2 MSP) No. 6 Ohio State; First round	L 62–70	20–11	UD Arena (12,945); Dayton, Ohio
*Non-conference game. ^{#}Rankings from AP Poll. (#) Tournament seedings in parentheses. MSP=Minneapolis. All times are in Eastern Time.
