= 2001–02 The Citadel Bulldogs basketball team =

American college basketball season

2001–02 The Citadel Bulldogs men's basketball
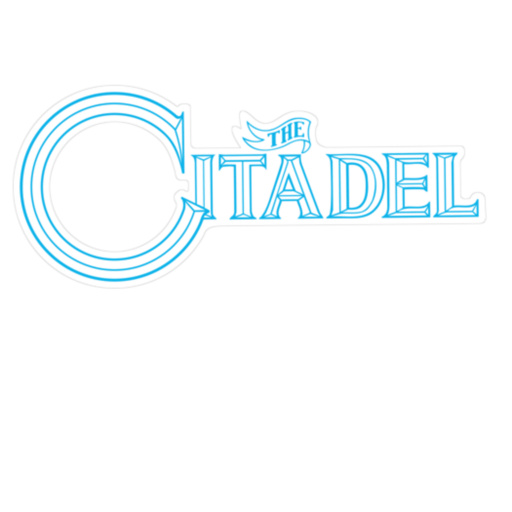
- Conference: Southern Conference
- South Division
- Record: 17–12 (8–8 SoCon)
- Head coach: Pat Dennis
- Home arena: McAlister Field House

2001–02 Southern Conference men's basketball standings
	Conf.				Overall
Team	W		L	PCT	W		L	PCT
North
Davidson †	11	–	5	.688	21	–	10	.677
East Tennessee State	11	–	5	.688	18	–	10	.643
UNC Greensboro	11	–	5	.688	20	–	11	.645
Western Carolina	6	–	10	.375	12	–	16	.429
VMI	5	–	11	.313	10	–	18	.357
Appalachian State	5	–	11	.313	10	–	18	.357
South
Georgia Southern	9	–	7	.563	16	–	12	.571
Chattanooga	9	–	7	.563	16	–	14	.533
College of Charleston	9	–	7	.563	21	–	9	.700
The Citadel	8	–	8	.500	17	–	12	.586
Furman	7	–	9	.438	17	–	14	.548
Wofford	5	–	11	.313	11	–	18	.379
† SoCon Tournament winner As of March 19, 2002; Rankings from AP Poll

The 2001–02 The Citadel Bulldogs basketball team represented The Citadel, The Military College of South Carolina in the 2001–02 NCAA Division I men's basketball season. The Bulldogs were led by fifth head coach Pat Dennis and played their home games at McAlister Field House. They were a member of the South Division of the Southern Conference.

== Roster ==
Number	Name	Position	Height	Weight	Year	Hometown
	Travis Cantrell	Guard	6–3		Senior	
	David Coisson	Forward	6–5		Sophomore	
	Gregg Jones	Centre	6-8		Junior	
	Patrick Jordan	Centre	6–8		Sophomore	
	Mike Joseph	Guard	6–5		Junior	
	Ramos Krywonis	Guard	6–5		Junior	
	Kenny Milford	Guard	6–8		Junior	
	Max Mombollet	Forward	6–8		Sophomore	
	Max Puckett	Forward	6–4		Senior	
	Sewell Setzer	Forward	6–6		Freshman	
	Ben Tobias	Forward	6–6		Junior	
	Cliff Washburn	Forward	6-7		Senior	
	Erick Wilson	Guard	6–0		Sophomore	
	Clyde Wormley	Guard	6–4		Junior	
	Kedron Young	Guard	6-0		Freshmen	

== Schedule ==
Date time, TV	Opponent	Result	Record	Site city, state
November 19	Flagler	W 69–62	1–0	McAlister Field House; Charleston, SC
November 23	at NC State	L 53–63	1–1	Raleigh Entertainment & Sports Arena; Raleigh, NC
November 26	William & Mary	W 67-62	2-1	McAlister Field House; Charleston, SC
November 29	Navy	W 83-47	3-1	McAlister Field House; Charleston, SC
December 1	Charleston Southern	L 66-70	3-2	McAlister Field House; Charleston, SC
December 5	Emmanuel	W 97-59	4-2	McAlister Field House; Charleston, SC
December 8	Davidson	W 69-50	5-2 (1–0)	McAlister Field House; Charleston, SC
December 10	at Philandar Smith	W 65-51	6-2	Mims Gymnasium; Little Rock, AR
December 17	Greensboro College	W 72-40	7-2	McAlister Field House; Charleston, SC
December 20	at South Carolina	L 57-73	7-3	Colonial Life Arena; Columbia, SC
December 29	Coastal Carolina	W 74-62	8-3	McAlister Field House; Charleston, SC
January 2	at South Carolina State	W 89-81	9-3	SHM Memorial Center; Orangeburg, SC
January 5	East Tennessee State	W 74-61	10-3 (2–0)	McAlister Field House; Charleston, SC
January 7	at Wofford	L 64-73	10-4 (2–1)	Benjamin Johnson Arena; Spartanburg, SC
January 12	at Western Carolina	W 105-97	11-4 (3–1)	Ramsey Center; Cullowhee, SC
January 14	Georgia Southern	W 85-80	12-4 (4–1)	McAlister Field House; Charleston, SC
January 19	Chattanooga	W 72-64	13-4 (5–1)	McAlister Field House; Charleston, SC
January 21	at College of Charleston	L 65-77	13-4 (5–2)	TD Arena; Charleston, SC
January 26	Appalachian State	L 74-78	13-4 (5–3)	McAlister Field House; Charleston, SC
January 28	at Furman	L 75-83	13-4 (5–4)	Timmons Arena; Greenville, SC
February 2	at Chattanooga	L 77-84	13-4 (5–5)	McKenzie Arena; Chattanooga, TN
February 4	College of Charleston	W 60-58	14-4 (6–5)	McAlister Field House; Charleston, SC
February 9	at UNC Greensboro	W 60-58	14-9 (6–6)	Greensboro Coliseum; Greensboro, NC
February 11	at Furman	L 64-70	14-10 (6–7)	McAlister Field House; Charleston, SC
February 16	at Georgia Southern	L 86-95	14-11 (6–8)	Hanner Fieldhouse; Statesboro, GA
February 18	at VMI	W 75-55	15-11 (7–8)	Cameron Hall; Lexington, VA
February 23	Wofford	W 75-55	16-11 (8–8)	McAlister Field House; Charleston, SC
2002 Southern Conference men's basketball tournament
February 28	vs. VMI	W 80–70	17-11	North Charleston Coliseum; North Charleston, SC
March 1	vs. Davidson	L 58–71	17-12	North Charleston Coliseum; North Charleston, SC
*Non-conference game. (#) Tournament seedings in parentheses. All times are in Eastern Time.
