= 2004 Big South Conference men's basketball tournament =

- Classification: Division I
- Season: 2003–04
- Teams: 8
- Site: Campus sites
- Finals site: Vines Center; Lynchburg, VA
- Champions: Liberty (2nd title)
- Winning coach: Randy Dunton (1st title)
- MVP: Danny Gathings (High Point)
- Attendance: 24,860

2003–04 Big South Conference men's basketball standings
	Conf.				Overall
Team	W		L	PCT	W		L	PCT
Birmingham–Southern	12	–	4	.750	19	–	7	.731
Liberty †	12	–	4	.750	18	–	15	.545
High Point	10	–	6	.625	19	–	11	.633
Winthrop	10	–	6	.625	16	–	12	.571
Coastal Carolina	8	–	8	.500	14	–	15	.483
Radford	7	–	9	.438	12	–	16	.429
UNC Asheville	6	–	10	.375	9	–	20	.310
VMI	4	–	12	.250	6	–	22	.214
Charleston Southern	3	–	13	.188	6	–	22	.214
† 2004 Big South tournament winner Rankings from AP Poll

The 2004 Big South Conference men's basketball tournament took place March 2–6, 2004, at campus sites. The tournament was won by the Liberty Flames, their second tournament win in school history. Liberty defeated High Point in the title game 89–44, although Danny Gathings of High Point won the tournament's Most Valuable Player.

== Format ==
Eight of the conference's nine teams participated for the tournament, with Birmingham–Southern being ineligible. Teams were seeded by conference winning percentage. All games were hosted at campus sites, with home-field advantage going to the higher seed.

== Bracket ==
Quarterfinals; March 2
1	Liberty	60
8	Charleston Southern	54
4	Coastal Carolina	67
5	Radford	62
3	Winthrop	46
6	UNC Asheville	49
2	High Point	75
7	VMI	43

Semifinals; March 4
1	Liberty	88
4	Coastal Carolina	73
6	UNC Asheville	49
2	High Point	63

Finals; March 6
1	Liberty	89
2	High Point	44

- Source

== All-Tournament Team ==
- Danny Gathings, High Point
- Larry Blair, Liberty
- Gabe Martin, Liberty
- Zione White, High Point
- K. J. Garland, UNC Asheville
