= Duffy Conroy =

American basketball player and coach

Current position
- Title: Assistant coach
- Team: Tulsa
- Conference: The American

Biographical details
- Born: Naperville, Illinois

Playing career
- 1996–2000: St. Ambrose

Coaching career (HC unless noted)
- 2000–2001: Milwaukee (DBO)
- 2001–2003: Wisconsin (VC)
- 2003–2004: Assumption HS
- 2004–2005: Wisconsin (DBO)
- 2005–2015: Milwaukee (asst.)
- 2015–2022: Louisiana Tech (asst.)
- 2022–present: Tulsa (asst.)

Administrative career (AD unless noted)
- 2003–2004: Assumption HS

Michael "Duffy" Conroy is an American college basketball coach and currently an assistant coach with the Tulsa Golden Hurricane basketball team.

== Biography ==
A native of Davenport, Iowa, Conroy is married with four children. He attended St. Ambrose University, where he played on the men's basketball team. Conroy's brother, Ed, currently is in his second stint as head coach at The Citadel.

== Coaching career ==
After serving in various position with the Panthers and the Wisconsin Badgers and at Assumption High School in Davenport, Iowa, he rejoined the Panthers as an assistant coach in 2005.
