= 2001–02 Davidson Wildcats men's basketball team =

American college basketball season

2001–02 Davidson Wildcats men's basketball

SoCon North champions SoCon tournament champions

NCAA tournament, First Round
- Conference: Southern Conference
- North
- Record: 21–10 (11–5 SoCon)
- Head coach: Bob McKillop (13th season)
- Home arena: Belk Arena

2001–02 Southern Conference men's basketball standings
| | Conf. | | | | Overall |
| Team | W | | L | PCT | W | | L | PCT |
|---|---|---|---|---|---|---|---|---|
North
| Davidson † | 11 | – | 5 | .688 | 21 | – | 10 | .677 |
| East Tennessee State | 11 | – | 5 | .688 | 18 | – | 10 | .643 |
| UNC Greensboro | 11 | – | 5 | .688 | 20 | – | 11 | .645 |
| Western Carolina | 6 | – | 10 | .375 | 12 | – | 16 | .429 |
| VMI | 5 | – | 11 | .313 | 10 | – | 18 | .357 |
| Appalachian State | 5 | – | 11 | .313 | 10 | – | 18 | .357 |
South
| Georgia Southern | 9 | – | 7 | .563 | 16 | – | 12 | .571 |
| Chattanooga | 9 | – | 7 | .563 | 16 | – | 14 | .533 |
| College of Charleston | 9 | – | 7 | .563 | 21 | – | 9 | .700 |
| The Citadel | 8 | – | 8 | .500 | 17 | – | 12 | .586 |
| Furman | 7 | – | 9 | .438 | 17 | – | 14 | .548 |
| Wofford | 5 | – | 11 | .313 | 11 | – | 18 | .379 |
† SoCon Tournament winner As of March 19, 2002; Rankings from AP Poll

The 2001–02 Davidson Wildcats men's basketball team represented Davidson College in NCAA men's Division I competition during the 2001–02 NCAA Division I men's basketball season. Led by head coach Bob McKillop, the team played its home games at Belk Arena. The Wildcats finished atop the Southern Conference North division regular season standings and won the Southern Conference tournament to receive an automatic bid to the NCAA tournament as No. 13 seed in the West region. Davidson finished win an overall record of 21–10 (11–5 SoCon).

== Roster ==
2001–02 Davidson Wildcats men's basketball team
Players
Coaches

| Pos. | # | Name | Height | Weight | Year | Hometown |
|---|---|---|---|---|---|---|
| G | 13 | Peter Anderer | 6 ft 1 in (1.85 m) | 180 lb (82 kg) | Jr | New York, New York |
| F | 22 | Chris Pearson | 6 ft 9 in (2.06 m) | 230 lb (104 kg) | Jr |

Head coach

- Bob McKillop (Hofstra)

Assistant coach(es)

Legend

- (C) Team captain
- (S) Suspended
- (I) Ineligible
- (W) Walk-on
- Injured
- Current redshirt

Roster

== Schedule and results ==
| Date time, TV | Rank^{#} | Opponent^{#} | Result | Record | Site city, state |
Regular season
| Nov 16, 2001* | | at Charlotte | L 51–65 | 0–1 | Dale F. Halton Arena; Charlotte, North Carolina |
| Nov 20, 2001* | | at North Carolina | W 58–54 | 1–1 | Dean Smith Center; Chapel Hill, North Carolina |
| Dec 19, 2001* | | at Georgia Tech | L 69–83 | 5–4 | Alexander Memorial Coliseum; Atlanta, Georgia |
| Dec 22, 2001* | | at Penn | W 75–71 ^{OT} | 6–4 | The Palestra; Philadelphia, Pennsylvania |
SoCon Tournament
| Mar 1, 2002* | | vs. The Citadel; Quarterfinals | W 71–58 | 19–9 | North Charleston Coliseum; North Charleston, South Carolina |
| Mar 2, 2002* | | vs. UNC Greensboro; Semifinals | W 68–58 | 20–9 | North Charleston Coliseum; North Charleston, South Carolina |
| Mar 3, 2002* | | vs. Furman; Championship game | W 62–57 | 21–9 | North Charleston Coliseum; North Charleston, South Carolina |
NCAA Tournament
| Mar 14, 2002* | (13 W) | vs. (4 W) No. 14 Ohio State; First round | L 64–69 | 21–10 | University Arena; Albuquerque, New Mexico |
*Non-conference game. ^{#}Rankings from AP. (#) Tournament seedings in parentheses. W=West. All times are in Eastern.
