= 2002 Southern Conference men's basketball tournament =

- Classification: Division I
- Season: 2001–02
- Teams: 12
- Site: North Charleston Coliseum; North Charleston, SC
- Champions: Davidson (7th title)
- Winning coach: Bob McKillop (2nd title)

2001–02 Southern Conference men's basketball standings
	Conf.				Overall
Team	W		L	PCT	W		L	PCT
North
Davidson †	11	–	5	.688	21	–	10	.677
East Tennessee State	11	–	5	.688	18	–	10	.643
UNC Greensboro	11	–	5	.688	20	–	11	.645
Western Carolina	6	–	10	.375	12	–	16	.429
VMI	5	–	11	.313	10	–	18	.357
Appalachian State	5	–	11	.313	10	–	18	.357
South
Georgia Southern	9	–	7	.563	16	–	12	.571
Chattanooga	9	–	7	.563	16	–	14	.533
College of Charleston	9	–	7	.563	21	–	9	.700
The Citadel	8	–	8	.500	17	–	12	.586
Furman	7	–	9	.438	17	–	14	.548
Wofford	5	–	11	.313	11	–	18	.379
† SoCon Tournament winner As of March 19, 2002; Rankings from AP Poll

The 2002 Southern Conference men's basketball tournament took place from February 28–March 3, 2002 at the North Charleston Coliseum in North Charleston, South Carolina. The Davidson Wildcats, led by head coach Bob McKillop defeated the Furman Paladins in the championship game to win their seventh title in school history and receive the automatic berth to the 2002 NCAA tournament.

== Format ==
All twelve teams were eligible for the tournament. The tournament used a preset bracket consisting of four rounds, the first of which featured four games, with the winners moving on to the quarterfinal round. The top two finishers in each division received first round byes.

== Bracket ==
First round February 28
4S	The Citadel	80
5N	VMI	70
3N	UNC Greensboro	70
6S	Wofford	41
4N	Western Carolina	61
5S	Furman	65
3S	Coll. of Charleston	85
6N	Appalachian State	61

Quarterfinals; March 1
1N	Davidson	71
4S	The Citadel	58
2S	Chattanooga	57
3N	UNC Greensboro	67
1S	Georgia Southern	70
5S	Furman	73
2N	East Tennessee St.	75
3S	Coll. of Charleston	76*

Semifinals; March 2
1N	Davidson	68
3N	UNC Greensboro	58
3S	Coll. of Charleston	43
5S	Furman	44

Championship Game; March 3
1N	Davidson	62
5S	Furman	57

* Overtime game

== See also ==
- List of Southern Conference men's basketball champions
