= Jordy Kuiper =

Dutch basketball player (born 1995)

No. 18 – Donar
- Position: Power forward
- League: BNXT League

Personal information
- Born: 2 June 1995 (age 31) Groningen, Netherlands
- Listed height: 2.06 m (6 ft 9 in)
- Listed weight: 113 kg (249 lb)

Career information
- College: UNC Greensboro (2013–2018)
- NBA draft: 2018: undrafted
- Playing career: 2018–present

Career history
- 2018–2019: Grindavík
- 2019–2020: Cáceres
- 2020–2021: CEP Lorient
- 2021–2023: Real Valladolid
- 2023-present: Donar

Jordy Kuiper (born 2 June 1995) is a Dutch basketball player who plays for Donar of the BNXT League. Standing at 2.06 m (6 ft 9 in), he plays as power forward. Kuiper played five seasons of college basketball for UNCG before turning professional in 2018. He then went on to play in Iceland, Spain and France, before returning to the Netherlands in 2023.

== Early career ==
Kuiper played with the Canarias Basketball Academy in Spain. There, he averaged 16 points and 9

== College career ==
Kuiper played college basketball for the UNC Greensboro Spartans. In his third year, he redshirted. As a student at UNCG, Kuiper majored in sociology.

== Professional career ==
In August 2018, Kuiper signed his first professional contract with Grindavík in Iceland. He averaged 16.8 points and 7.8 rebounds per game in the Icelandic Premier League.

On 7 August 2019, Kuiper signed with Cáceres Ciudad del Baloncesto for the 2019–20 season.

On 14 July 2020, Kuiper signed with CEP Lorient in France. He averaged 7.2 points in 13 games in the NM1.

On August 2, 2021, he has signed with Real Valladolid Baloncesto of the LEB Oro. Kuiper remained with Valladolid for a second season.

In August 2023, Kuiper signed a one-year agreement with Donar, the team from his hometown Groningen that he supported as a kid.

== National team career ==
On 12 November 2022, Kuipers made his senior debut for the Netherlands senior team in a 77–96 home loss to Ukraine. He scored 2 points in nine minutes of play.

== Personal ==
Kuiper has type 1 diabetes. Growing up in Groningen, he was a supporter of Donar.
