= 2001 Southern Conference men's basketball tournament =

- Classification: Division I
- Season: 2000–01
- Teams: 12
- Site: BI-LO Center; Greenville, SC
- Champions: UNC Greensboro (1st title)
- Winning coach: Fran McCaffery (1st title)

2000–01 Southern Conference men's basketball standings
	Conf.				Overall
Team	W		L	PCT	W		L	PCT
North
East Tennessee State	13	–	3	.813	18	–	10	.643
UNC Greensboro †	10	–	6	.625	19	–	12	.613
Appalachian State	7	–	9	.438	11	–	20	.355
Davidson	7	–	9	.438	15	–	17	.469
VMI	5	–	11	.313	9	–	19	.321
Western Carolina	3	–	13	.188	6	–	25	.194
South
College of Charleston	12	–	4	.750	22	–	7	.759
Chattanooga	9	–	7	.563	17	–	13	.567
The Citadel	9	–	7	.563	16	–	12	.571
Georgia Southern	9	–	7	.563	15	–	15	.500
Wofford	7	–	9	.438	12	–	16	.429
Furman	5	–	11	.313	10	–	16	.385
† SoCon Tournament winner As of April 30, 2001; Rankings from AP poll

The 2001 Southern Conference men's basketball tournament took place from March 1–4, 2001 at the BI-LO Center in Greenville, South Carolina. The UNC Greensboro Spartans won their first title as a member of the Southern Conference and received the automatic berth to the 2001 NCAA tournament.

== Format ==
All twelve teams were eligible for the tournament. The tournament used a preset bracket consisting of four rounds, the first of which featured four games, with the winners moving on to the quarterfinal round. The top two finishers in each division received first round byes.

== Bracket ==
First round March 1
4S	Georgia Southern	76
5N	VMI	59
3N	Appalachian State	58
6S	Furman	56
4N	Davidson	60
5S	Wofford	57
3S	The Citadel	57
6N	Western Carolina	67

Quarterfinals; March 2
1N	East Tennessee St.	64
4S	Georgia Southern	72
2S	Chattanooga	74
3N	Appalachian State	48
1S	Coll. of Charleston	54
4N	Davidson	57
2N	UNC Greensboro	91
6N	Western Carolina	69

Semifinals; March 3
2S	Chattanooga	84
4S	Georgia Southern	73
2N	UNC Greensboro	73
4N	Davidson	68

Championship Game; March 4
2N	UNC Greensboro	67
2S	Chattanooga	66

* Overtime game

== See also ==
- List of Southern Conference men's basketball champions
