= Ed Conroy (basketball) =

American college basketball coach (born 1967)

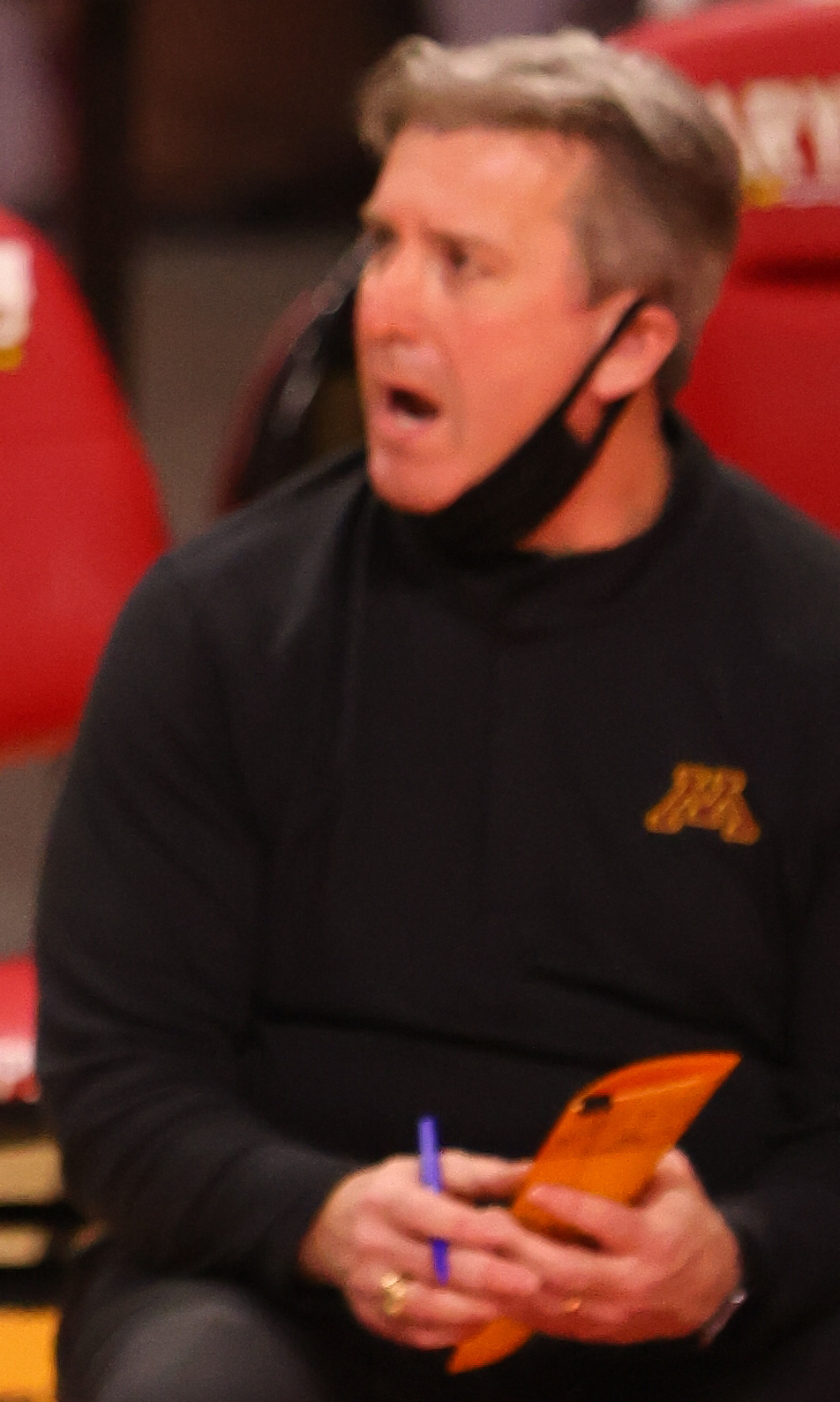
- Conroy in 2021

Current position
- Title: Head coach
- Team: The Citadel
- Conference: SoCon
- Record: 90–167 (.350)

Biographical details
- Born: February 17, 1967 (age 59); Davenport, Iowa, U.S.

Playing career
- 1985–1989: The Citadel

Coaching career (HC unless noted)
- 1990–1993: NC State (assistant)
- 1993–1994: VMI (assistant)
- 1994–1997: Furman (assistant)
- 1997–2000: Francis Marion
- 2000–2001: Tulsa (assistant)
- 2003–2005: Tennessee (assistant)
- 2005–2006: Coastal Carolina (assistant)
- 2006–2010: The Citadel
- 2010–2016: Tulane
- 2016–2021: Minnesota (assistant)
- 2021–2022: Vanderbilt (associate HC)
- 2022–present: The Citadel

Head coaching record
- Overall: 182–270 (.403)
- Tournaments: 0–1 (CBI); 1–2 (CIT)

Accomplishments and honors

Awards
- SoCon Coach of the Year (2009); Skip Prosser Man of the Year Award (2009)

Edward S. Conroy (born February 17, 1967) is an American college basketball coach who is currently serving his second stint as the head coach of The Citadel Bulldogs.

== Career ==
Conroy previously served as the associate head coach for the Vanderbilt Commodores and as an assistant coach for the Minnesota Golden Gophers. Conroy is a former head men's basketball coach at Tulane University, being hired in April 2010. Conroy was officially relieved of his duties as Tulane head coach on March 14, 2016.

Before joining Tulane, he coached four seasons at The Citadel and three seasons at Francis Marion University.

Conroy announced his return to The Citadel on March 23, 2022. During his first stint as head coach there from 2006 to 2010, he led the Bulldogs to their first 20-win season in over 30 years during the 2008–2009 season, in which the Bulldogs made the 2009 CollegeInsider.com Postseason Tournament-to date, the only postseason appearance in school history. He was selected as the SoCon Coach of the Year by the league's head coaches and media members. He was also named the NABC District 22 Coach of the Year, CollegeInsider.com Coach of the Year and the Skip Prosser Man of the Year.

His brother, Duffy, is an assistant coach at Tulsa. Ed is also a first cousin to novelist Pat Conroy.

== Head coaching record ==
Record table
Season	Team	Overall	Conference	Standing	Postseason
The Citadel Bulldogs (Southern Conference) (2006–2010)
2006–07	The Citadel	7–23	4–14	6th (South)	
2007–08	The Citadel	6–24	1–19	6th (South)	
2008–09	The Citadel	20–13	15–5	T–2nd (South)	CIT First Round
2009–10	The Citadel	16–16	9–9	4th (South)	
Tulane Green Wave (Conference USA) (2010–2014)
2010–11	Tulane	13–17	3–13	12th	
2011–12	Tulane	15–16	3–13	12th	
2012–13	Tulane	20–15	6–10	9th	CIT Second Round
2013–14	Tulane	17–17	8–8	7th	CBI First Round
Tulane Green Wave (American Athletic Conference) (2014–2016)
2014–15	Tulane	15–16	6–12	7th	
2015–16	Tulane	12–22	3–15	11th	
Tulane:		92–103 (.472)	29–71 (.290)		
The Citadel Bulldogs (Southern Conference) (2022–present)
2022–23	The Citadel	10–22	5–13	9th	
2023–24	The Citadel	11–21	3–15	9th	
2024–25	The Citadel	5–25	0–18	10th	
2025–26	The Citadel	11–22	7–11	T–8th	
2026–27	The Citadel	4–2	0–0		
The Citadel:		90–167 (.350)	43–104 (.293)		
Total:		182–270 (.403)			
National champion Postseason invitational champion Conference regular season champion Conference regular season and conference tournament champion Division regular season champion Division regular season and conference tournament champion Conference tournament champion
