= UNC Greensboro Spartans men's basketball =

UNC Greensboro Spartans
| 2026–27 UNC Greensboro Spartans men's basketball team |
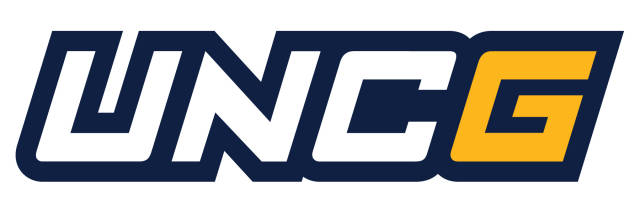
- University: University of North Carolina at Greensboro
- Head coach: Jerod Haase (1st season)
- Location: Greensboro, North Carolina
- Arena: Bodford Arena (capacity: 1,718)
- Conference: SoCon
- Nickname: Spartans
- Colors: Navy, white, and gold

NCAA Division I tournament appearances
- 1996, 2001, 2018, 2021

Conference tournament champions
- 1980 (Dixie); 1996 (Big South); 2001, 2018, 2021 (SoCon)

Conference regular-season champions
- 1981, 1987, 1988 (Dixie); 1995, 1996 (Big South); 2002, 2017, 2018, 2021 (SoCon)

Conference division champions
- 2012 (SoCon)

Uniforms
| Home | Away | Alternate |

The UNC Greensboro (UNCG) Spartans men's basketball team represents the University of North Carolina at Greensboro in NCAA Division I. The school's team currently competes in the Southern Conference. The Spartans have appeared four times in the NCAA Division I men's basketball tournament, most recently in 2021.

== History ==
The school, formerly The Women's College of The University of North Carolina, allowed male students beginning 1965-66 and started a men's basketball program the following year. The first coach was an instructor in the Physical Education program, the assistant was an administrator in the Chancellor's office, with some limited experience from the University of Kansas basketball program. Games were scheduled with Belmont Abbey, Elon, Guilford, and a few other small colleges. Players came from already-enrolled students, responding to on-campus ads. No records of results are available. UNCG formalized their program and entered into a twenty-year period participating as an NCAA Division III member, before moving up to NCAA Division II in 1988, and swiftly ascending to NCAA Division I by 1991.

=== 1991–1999: Division I firsts for the Spartans ===
Mike Dement served as the architect of the program in its move to Division I. Dement was the Spartans' head coach from 1991 to 1995, leading them from a team with no conference affiliation to the top of the Big South Conference regular season standings in just four seasons. In his last two seasons at UNCG, Dement's teams went 38–18, including a then school-record 23 wins in 1994–95, along with the Big South Conference's regular season title. That team received votes in the Associated Press and ESPN/USA Today Coaches' polls, a first for the program.

Following the 1994-95 season, Dement left to take over the men's basketball program at Southern Methodist University (SMU) and was replaced in Greensboro by Randy Peele. In only the second season in which UNCG was eligible for Division I postseason competition, the Spartans won the Big South Conference regular season and tournament championship, advancing to the NCAA tournament where they received the 15th seed in the Southeast region. In their first NCAA appearance, they fell in the first round to the Cincinnati Bearcats.

After following up their conference championship season with a 10–20 regular season, UNCG left the Big South in 1997 to join the Southern Conference (SoCon). The Spartans finished near the bottom of their division in both of their first two seasons in the SoCon and, after four years in Greensboro, Peele left the Spartans and took an assistant job at Virginia Tech.

=== 1999–2005: Fran McCaffery brings the Spartans back ===
Fran McCaffery hit the ground running in Greensboro, compiling a 15–13 record overall and a 9–7 Southern Conference mark in his first season that was the 18th-most improved record nationally among NCAA Division I teams.

In his second season, McCaffery guided the Spartans to a 19–12 record and the 2001 SoCon tournament championship. It was the school's second NCAA tournament berth. The Spartans received a 16 seed, losing in the first round to overall tournament top seed Stanford.

The following year (2001–2002) McCaffery led the Spartans to their first 20-win season since joining the SoCon. It marked the first time the program claimed a share of the SoCon North Division title as well. After falling to eventual tournament champion Davidson in the conference tournament semifinals, the Spartans were awarded a berth into the 2002 NIT, where they lost to eventual champion Memphis.

In his final year in Greensboro, McCaffery brought the Spartans to the brink of the NCAA Tournament before a SoCon Championship game loss to Chattanooga. He led UNCG to a victory over the Davidson Wildcats in the semifinals, defeating a team that had been 16–0 in conference play. A big part of that success was SoCon Freshman of the Year Kyle Hines. Hines set UNCG and SoCon records for blocked shots, and also broke several other UNCG single-game and freshman single-season marks. After the season, McCaffery left UNCG to take the head men's basketball position at Siena College.

=== 2005–2011: return of Mike Dement ===
In his first season back at UNCG, Mike Dement led a young Spartan squad to a 12–19 mark. He had two players earn all-conference status in Ricky Hickman and Kyle Hines, and another earn SoCon All-Freshman honors.

In 2006–07, Dement guided the Spartans to a 16–14 mark, including a second-place finish in the Southern Conference's Northern Division. Hines, only a junior, earned Southern Conference Player of the Year and Associated Press All-America Honorable Mention status – both accomplishments were firsts for the UNCG program. The Spartans were considered by many to be the most dangerous team in that year's SoCon Tournament, but were upended in the final seconds by Furman in the quarterfinal round.

Despite milestones like the program's first-ever win over an Atlantic Coast Conference (ACC team) (Georgia Tech in 2007), and the largest ever home crowd at a UNCG basketball game (21,124 vs Duke in 2005), Dement's teams saw little success in his return. After several seasons with fewer than 10 victories, Dement eventually resigned in the middle of the 2011-12 season.

=== Move to Greensboro Coliseum ===
Beginning with the 2009–10 season, the men's basketball team plays all of their home games in the Greensboro Coliseum. The arena, which holds over 23,000 seats, is configured to hold around 7,500 spectators for most games.

As part of the move, the Coliseum remodeled a floor to become a Spartan home floor and also completely renovated a massive locker room space for the team, complete with training room, meeting facilities, coaches offices and a players' lounge.

=== 2011–2021: sustained success under Wes Miller ===
Following the mid-season resignation of Mike Dement in December 2011, Wes Miller was given the reins of the program on an interim basis. At the time, the Spartans had a record of 2-8 and were in the midst of an eleven-game losing streak. Under Miller, the team finished Southern Conference play with a 10-8 record, 13-19 overall, winning first place in the Southern Conference North Division. Miller was named the 2012 Southern Conference Coach of the Year and was hired officially as head coach.

The Spartans struggled in Miller's first few years, but he soon brought UNCG an unprecedented run of success. The Spartans reached 25 wins for three successive seasons between 2016 and 2019, won three Southern Conference championships, reached the NCAA tournament in 2018 and 2021, and recorded the program's first postseason victory in the 2019 NIT. Miller is currently the winningest coach in the program's history.

Players recruited by Wes Miller regularly set new Spartan records. Guard Francis Alonso became UNCG's all-time leader in made 3-pointers and was a two-time first-team All-SoCon selection (2018, 2019). The Spartans also boasted four consecutive Southern Conference Defensive Players of the Year in forward James L. Dickey III (2018) and guard Isaiah Miller (2019, 2020, 2021). Isaiah Miller would go on to become the most decorated player in program history, being named SoCon Men's Basketball Player of the Year in 2020 and 2021, the first player to earn back to back SoCon Player of the Year awards since Stephen Curry at Davidson University.

The 2018–19 Spartans enjoyed their best season under Wes Miller. The team went 29–7, finishing 2nd in the Southern Conference and receiving the #1 overall seed in the NIT tournament where they beat Campbell University in the first round before losing to eventual tournament runners-up Libscomb University.

On April 14, 2021, Miller left UNCG to become the head men's basketball coach at the University of Cincinnati.

=== 2021–2026: Mike Jones era ===
On April 19, 2021, UNCG hired Mike Jones as head men's basketball coach.

== Retired numbers ==
UNCG Spartans retired numbers
| No. | Player | Position | Tenure |
| 1 | Isaiah Miller | G | 2017–21 |
| 5 | Scott Hartzell | PG | 1992–96 |
| 10 | Francis Alonso | G | 2015–19 |
| 23 | Courtney Eldridge | G | 1998–2002 |
| 42 | Kyle Hines | PF | 2004–08 |

=== Isaiah Miller No. 1 ===
Miller is first all-time in steals at UNCG with 315, second in field goals with 831, and third in career points with 1,967 career. He led the SoCon in steals for three consecutive seasons from 2018-21, and sits second all-time in the history of the conference. Miller finished his collegiate career at UNCG ranked fourth in scoring average at 14.9 points per game. After leading the Spartans to a SoCon Regular Season and Tournament title in 2021, he become the only UNCG men's basketball player to appear in multiple NCAA Tournaments.

He was later named the Bob Waters SoCon Male Athlete of the Year, the first Spartan to ever win the award. He was also named SoCon Coaches' and Media Player of the Year two times (2019-20 and 2020-21) - only the second player in conference history to do so - and SoCon Defensive Player of the Year in each of his final three seasons.

=== Scott Hartzell No. 5 ===
Hartzell was inducted into the UNCG Athletics Hall of Fame in 2006. He led UNCG in three-point field goals, three-point shooting percentage, and free throw shooting percentage all four seasons he played. He graduated in 1996 as the school's all-time leader in points at 1,539 and assists at 552. Though those marks have since been eclipsed, he still holds the UNCG record for career three-point field goal percentage (43.9%).

In 1995–96, Hartzell led the Spartans to their first NCAA men's basketball tournament appearance after winning the 1996 Big South Championship. During that memorable run, Hartzell ran his streak of consecutive games with a three-point field goal to 42 straight.

=== Francis Alonso No. 10 ===
A member of the Spartans from 2015 to 2019, Alonso leads UNCG with 396 three-pointers made in his collegiate career, 426 made free throws and an 87.1 free-throw percentage. His total for three-point baskets ranks third in SoCon history while his mark for free throws converted stands at seventh all-time in the conference's history.

Alonso is the second player in UNCG history to reach the 2,000-point plateau, with a career total of 2,142 points. He helped UNCG win its first-ever postseason game vs. Houston Baptist in the Greensboro Coliseum in 2016, and finished his college career as a two-time National Association of Basketball Coaches (NABC) All-District first team honoree as well as being voted first team All-SoCon Coaches and Media in 2017-18 and 2018-19.

=== Courtney Eldridge No. 23 ===
Eldridge led the Spartans to the 2001 Southern Conference tournament championship against University of Tennessee at Chattanooga and their second NCAA tournament appearance. During the 2001–02 season, he was ranked ninth in the nation and first in the SoCon in steals, 23rd in the nation and 3rd in the conference in assists., leading that team to the 2002 Southern Conference regular season title and earning a bid to the NIT.

Eldridge is the Spartan's all-time career leader in assists (584).

=== Kyle Hines No. 42 ===
In the 2006–07 season, Kyle Hines became the first player in UNCG history to receive the Southern Conference Player of the Year honor and to be named to the Associated Press All-America Honorable Mention. He became only the sixth player to score 2,000 points, grab 1,000 rebounds and block 300 shots in his college career, joining the ranks of David Robinson, Alonzo Mourning, Tim Duncan, Pervis Ellison and Derrick Coleman.

Hines is the Spartan's all-time leader in a number of statistical categories, including points (2187), blocks (349), points per game (18.2), and rebounds per game (8.7).

== Season-by-season results ==
Record table
| Season | Coach | Overall | Conference | Standing | Postseason |
|---|---|---|---|---|---|
Larry Hargett (Dixie Conference) (–1982)
| 1979–1980 | Larry Harget | 16–12 | 11–3 | 2nd | |
| 1980–1981 | Larry Harget | 17–8 | 11–3 | T-1st | |
| 1981–1982 | Larry Harget | 14–10 | 9–5 | 3rd | |
| Larry Harget: | | 47–30 | 31–11 | | |
Ed Douma (Dixie Conference) (1982–1984)
| 1982–1983 | Ed Douma | 16–9 | 10–4 | T-3rd | |
| 1983–1984 | Ed Douma | 12–14 | 8–6 | T-3rd | |
| Ed Douma: | | 28–23 | 18–10 | | |
Bob McEvoy (Dixie Conference) (1984–1988)
| 1984–1985 | Bob McEvoy | 9–16 | 7–7 | T-3rd | |
| 1985–1986 | Bob McEvoy | 13–14 | 8–6 | 4th | |
| 1986–1987 | Bob McEvoy | 22–6 | 12–2 | 1st | |
| 1987–1988 | Bob McEvoy | 19–8 | 13–1 | 1st | |
Bob McEvoy (NCAA Division II independent) (1988–1991)
| 1988–1989 | Bob McEvoy | 14–13 | | | |
| 1989–1990 | Bob McEvoy | 6–22 | | | |
| 1990–1991 | Bob McEvoy | 9–17 | | | |
| Bob McEvoy: | | 92–96 | 40–16 | | |
Mike Dement (NCAA Division I independent) (1991–1993)
| 1991–1992 | Mike Dement | 7–21 | | | |
| 1992–1993 | Mike Dement | 10–17 | | | |
Mike Dement (Big South) (1993–1995)
| 1993–1994 | Mike Dement | 15–12 | 11–7 | 5th | |
| 1994–1995 | Mike Dement | 23–6 | 14–2 | 1st | |
| Mike Dement: | | 55–56 | 25–9 | | |
Randy Peele (Big South) (1995–1997)
| 1995–1996 | Randy Peele | 20–10 | 11–3 | 1st | NCAA first round |
| 1996–1997 | Randy Peele | 10–20 | 6–8 | T-5th North | |
Randy Peele (Southern Conference) (1997–1999)
| 1997–1998 | Randy Peele | 9–19 | 6–9 | T-4th North | |
| 1998–1999 | Randy Peele | 7–20 | 5–11 | 5th North | |
| Randy Peele: | | 46–69 | 28–31 | | |
Fran McCaffery (Southern Conference) (1999–2005)
| 1999–2000 | Fran McCaffery | 15–13 | 9–7 | 3rd North | |
| 2000–2001 | Fran McCaffery | 19–12 | 10–6 | 2nd North | NCAA first round |
| 2001–2002 | Fran McCaffery | 20–11 | 11–5 | T-1st North | NIT first round |
| 2002–2003 | Fran McCaffery | 7–22 | 3–13 | T-5th North | |
| 2003–2004 | Fran McCaffery | 11–17 | 7–9 | T-3rd North | |
| 2004–2005 | Fran McCaffery | 18–12 | 9–7 | T-2nd North | |
| Fran McCaffery: | | 90–87 | 49–47 | | |
Mike Dement (Southern Conference) (2005–2011*)
| 2005–2006 | Mike Dement | 12–19 | 4–10 | 5th North | |
| 2006–2007 | Mike Dement | 16–14 | 12–6 | 2nd North | |
| 2007–2008 | Mike Dement | 19–12 | 12–8 | 3rd North | |
| 2008–2009 | Mike Dement | 5–25 | 4–16 | 6th North | |
| 2009–2010 | Mike Dement | 8–23 | 6–12 | T-3rd North | |
| 2010–2011 | Mike Dement | 7–24 | 6–12 | 5th North | |
| 2011–2012* | Mike Dement | 2–8 | 0–3 | | |
| Mike Dement: | | 124–181 | 74–76 | | |
Wes Miller (Southern Conference) (2011–2021)
| 2011–2012 | Wes Miller | 11–11 | 10–5 | 1st North | |
| 2012–2013 | Wes Miller | 9–22 | 6–12 | 6th North | |
| 2013–2014 | Wes Miller | 14–18 | 7–9 | 6th | |
| 2014–2015 | Wes Miller | 11–22 | 6–12 | T–7th | |
| 2015–2016 | Wes Miller | 15–19 | 10–8 | T–5th | CBI Quarterfinals |
| 2016–2017 | Wes Miller | 25-10 | 14-4 | T–1st | NIT first round |
| 2017–2018 | Wes Miller | 27–7 | 15–3 | 1st | NCAA round of 64 |
| 2018–2019 | Wes Miller | 29–7 | 15–3 | 2nd | NIT second round |
| 2019–2020 | Wes Miller | 23–8 | 13–5 | 3rd | |
| 2020–2021 | Wes Miller | 21–8 | 13–5 | 1st | NCAA round of 64 |
| Wes Miller: | | 185-133 | 109-66 | | |
Mike Jones (Southern Conference) (2021–present)
| 2021–2022 | Mike Jones | 17–15 | 9–9 | T-5th | CBI first round |
| 2022–2023 | Mike Jones | 20–12 | 14–4 | 3rd | |
| 2023–2024 | Mike Jones | 21–10 | 12–6 | 2nd | |
| 2024–2025 | Mike Jones | 0–0 | 0–0 | | |
| Mike Jones: | | 58–37 | 35–19 | | |
| Total: | | 667–656 | | | |
National champion Postseason invitational champion Conference regular season champion Conference regular season and conference tournament champion Division regular season champion Division regular season and conference tournament champion Conference tournament champion

== Postseason ==
=== NCAA Division I tournament results ===
The Spartans have appeared in the NCAA Division I tournament four times. Their combined record is 0–4.

| Year | Seed | Round | Opponent | Result |
|---|---|---|---|---|
| 1996 | #15 | First Round | #2 Cincinnati | L 61–66 |
| 2001 | #16 | First Round | #1 Stanford | L 60–88 |
| 2018 | #13 | First Round | #4 Gonzaga | L 64–68 |
| 2021 | #13 | First Round | #4 Florida State | L 54–64 |

=== NIT results ===
The Spartans have appeared in the National Invitation Tournament (NIT) three times. Their combined record is 1–3.

| Year | Round | Opponent | Result |
|---|---|---|---|
| 2002 | First Round | Memphis | L 62–82 |
| 2017 | First Round | Syracuse | L 77–90 |
| 2019 | First Round; Second Round | Campbell; Lipscomb | W 84–69; L 69–86 |

=== CBI results ===
The Spartans have appeared in the College Basketball Invitational (CBI) twice. Their record is 1–2.

| Year | Round | Opponent | Result |
|---|---|---|---|
| 2016 | First Round; Quarterfinals | Houston Baptist; Ohio | W 69–65; L 67–72 |
| 2022 | First Round | Boston University | L 68–71 |

== Current coaching staff ==
| Name | Position |
|---|---|
| Jerod Haase | Head Coach |
| Bryant Stith | Assistant Coach |
| Brent Gilbert | Assistant Coach |
| Josh Gross | Assistant Coach |
| C.J. Lee | Director of Basketball Operations |

== Notable former players ==
| Name | |
|---|---|
| Isaiah Miller | Played in the NBA G League for the Salt Lake City Stars and Iowa Wolves. |
| James L. Dickey III | Currently playing for Hapoel Ironi Eilat of the Israeli Basketball Premier League. |
| Francis Alonso | Playing for Bilbao Basket of Liga ACB (Spain) |
| Jordy Kuiper | Playing for Real Valladolid of Liga LEB Oro (Spain) |
| Marvin Smith Jr | Playing for Maine Celtics of the NBA G League |
| Diante Baldwin | Playing for Borac Mozzart of Adriatic League (Bosnia) |
| Ronnie Burrell | Currently head coach for the Osceola Magic of the NBA G League. |
| Courtney Eldridge | Currently Director of Recruiting/Player Development at the University of Iowa |
| Eric Cuthrell | Played in Spanish LEB league. (1997-2002) Won LEB MVP in 1999. Played in HEBA A1 Greek League 2002–2004. Inducted into the UNCG Athletics Hall of Fame in 2011 (Player), UNCG Athletics Hall of Fame in 2012 (1996 Men's Basketball Team) |
| Ricky Hickman | Played in Israel, Finland, Germany, Italy, Turkey; helped lead Maccabi Tel Aviv to a EuroLeague title in 2014, earning an All-EuroLeague Second Team selection in the process |
| Kyle Hines | Assistant general manager of the Long Island Nets, the NBA G League affiliate of the Brooklyn Nets; x4 EuroLeague titles, x3 EuroLeague Best Defender, EuroLeague 25th Anniversary Team, EuroLeague 2010–2020 All-Decade Team, VTB United League Hall of Fame, No. 42 retired by UNC Greensboro Spartans |
| James Maye | Currently an assistant coach for the Long Island Nets of the NBA G League. |
