= 2007–08 Cincinnati Bearcats men's basketball team =

American college basketball season

2007–08 Cincinnati Bearcats men's basketball
- Conference: Big East Conference (1979–2013)
- Record: 13–19 (8–10 Big East)
- Head coach: Mick Cronin (2nd season)
- Assistant coaches: Larry Davis (2nd season); Chris Goggin (2nd season); Tony Stubblefield (2nd season)
- Home arena: Fifth Third Arena

2007–08 Big East men's basketball standings
	Conf.				Overall
Team	W		L	PCT	W		L	PCT
No. 8 Georgetown	15	–	3	.833	28	–	6	.824
No. 13 Louisville	14	–	4	.778	27	–	9	.750
No. 15 Notre Dame	14	–	4	.778	25	–	8	.758
No. 16 Connecticut	13	–	5	.722	24	–	9	.727
West Virginia	11	–	7	.611	26	–	11	.703
No. 25 Marquette	11	–	7	.611	25	–	10	.714
No. 17 Pittsburgh†	10	–	8	.556	27	–	10	.730
Villanova	9	–	9	.500	22	–	13	.629
Syracuse	9	–	9	.500	21	–	14	.600
Cincinnati	8	–	10	.444	13	–	19	.406
Seton Hall	7	–	11	.389	17	–	15	.531
Providence	6	–	12	.333	15	–	16	.484
*DePaul	6	–	12	.333	11	–	19	.367
*St. John's	5	–	13	.278	11	–	19	.367
*South Florida	3	–	15	.167	12	–	19	.387
*Rutgers	3	–	15	.167	11	–	20	.355
† 2008 Big East tournament winner As of April 7, 2008; Rankings from AP Poll; *Did not qualify for 2008 Big East tournament.

The 2007–08 Cincinnati Bearcats men's basketball team represented the University of Cincinnati during the 2007–08 NCAA Division I men's basketball season. The team played its home games in Cincinnati, Ohio at the Fifth Third Arena, which has a capacity of 13,176. They are members of the Big East Conference. The Bearcats finished the season 13–19, 8–10 in Big East play and were defeated in the first round of the 2008 Big East men's basketball tournament by the 7th seed Pittsburgh.

The Bearcats would lose to Bradley in the first round of the 2008 College Basketball Invitational.

== Offseason ==
=== Departing players ===
Name	Number	Pos.	Height	Weight	Year	Hometown	Notes
Timmy Crowell	3	G	6'2"	170	Junior	Albuquerque, New Mexico	Transferred to Fort Lewis College
Connor Barwin	11	F	6'4"	240	Sophomore	Southfield, Michigan	Walk-on; did not return
Ronald Allen	23	F	6'9"	225	Senior	Los Angeles, California	Graduated
Walter Lewis	25	G	6'2"	190	Junior	Prince George, Virginia	Walk-on; did not return
Cedric McGowan	30	F	6'7"	225	Senior	Miami, Florida	Graduated

=== Recruiting class of 2007 ===
College recruiting
Name	Hometown	School	Height	Weight	Commit date
Larry Davis; SG	Houston, Texas	Alief Hastings High School	6 ft 3 in (1.91 m)	190 lb (86 kg)	Aug 8, 2006
Larry Davis; SG	Recruit ratings: 247Sports: (91)				
Darnell Wilks; PF	Nashville, Tennessee	Pioneer Christian Academy	6 ft 8 in (2.03 m)	205 lb (93 kg)	Nov 12, 2006
Darnell Wilks; PF	Recruit ratings: 247Sports: (93)				
Kenny Belton; PF	Salem, Virginia	Dudley High School (NC)	6 ft 7 in (2.01 m)	225 lb (102 kg)	Nov 17, 2006
Kenny Belton; PF	Recruit ratings: 247Sports: (92)				
Alvin Mitchell; SF	Fort Lauderdale, Florida	Cardinal Gibbons High School	6 ft 5 in (1.96 m)	205 lb (93 kg)	Mar 7, 2007
Alvin Mitchell; SF	Recruit ratings: 247Sports: (78)				
Rashad Bishop; SF	Paterson, New Jersey	Kennedy High School	6 ft 6 in (1.98 m)	220 lb (100 kg)	Apr 18, 2007
Rashad Bishop; SF	Recruit ratings: 247Sports: (67)				
Anthony McClain; C	Trenton, New Jersey	National Christian Academy (MD)	6 ft 11 in (2.11 m)	220 lb (100 kg)	Apr 19, 2007
Anthony McClain; C	Recruit ratings: 247Sports: (92)				
Overall recruit ranking: 247Sports: 19
Note: In many cases, Scout, Rivals, 247Sports, On3, and ESPN may conflict in their listings of height and weight.; In these cases, the average was taken. ESPN grades are on a 100-point scale.; Sources: "2007 Cincinnati Basketball Commits". ESPN.; "2007 Team Ranking". Rivals.

=== Recruiting class of 2008 ===
College recruiting (2008)
Name	Hometown	School	Height	Weight	Commit date
Yancy Gates; PF	Cincinnati, Ohio	Withrow High School	6 ft 8 in (2.03 m)	250 lb (110 kg)	Apr 15, 2007
Yancy Gates; PF	Recruit ratings: Rivals: 247Sports: (96)				
Cashmere Wright; PG	Savannah, Georgia	Urban Christian Academy	6 ft 0 in (1.83 m)	170 lb (77 kg)	Aug 16, 2007
Cashmere Wright; PG	Recruit ratings: Rivals: 247Sports: (93)				
Dion Dixon; SG	Chicago, Illinois	Crane High School	6 ft 3 in (1.91 m)	180 lb (82 kg)	Mar 2, 2008
Dion Dixon; SG	Recruit ratings: Rivals: 247Sports: (NR)				
Overall recruit ranking: 247Sports: 38
Note: In many cases, Scout, Rivals, 247Sports, On3, and ESPN may conflict in their listings of height and weight.; In these cases, the average was taken. ESPN grades are on a 100-point scale.; Sources: "2008 Cincinnati Basketball Commits". ESPN.; "2008 Team Ranking". Rivals.

== Roster ==
2007–08 Cincinnati Bearcats men's basketball team
Players
Coaches

Pos.	#	Name	Height	Weight	Year	Previous school	Hometown
G	1	Marvin Gentry	6 ft 3 in (1.91 m)	180 lb (82 kg)	Sr	McLennan CC	Fort Worth, Texas
G	5	Deonta Vaughn	6 ft 1 in (1.85 m)	190 lb (86 kg)	So	Harmony Community School	Indianapolis, Indiana
F	10	Marcus Sikes	6 ft 8 in (2.03 m)	230 lb (104 kg)	Sr	Mt. San Jacinto CC	Richmond, Virginia
G	11	Larry Davis	6 ft 3 in (1.91 m)	185 lb (84 kg)	Fr	Alief Hastings High School	Houston, Texas
F	15	Darnell Wilks	6 ft 7 in (2.01 m)	205 lb (93 kg)	Fr	Pioneer Christian Academy	Nashville, Tennessee
G	20	Branden Miller (W)	6 ft 4 in (1.93 m)	210 lb (95 kg)	Jr	Indian Hill High School	Cincinnati, Ohio
F	21	Mike Williams (injured)	6 ft 7 in (2.01 m)	240 lb (109 kg)	RS Jr	Texas	Camden, Alabama
F	22	Rashad Bishop	6 ft 6 in (1.98 m)	220 lb (100 kg)	Fr	Kennedy High School	Paterson, New Jersey
F	23	Alvin Mitchell	6 ft 5 in (1.96 m)	215 lb (98 kg)	Fr	Cardinal Gibbons High School	Ft. Lauderdale, Florida
C	30	Anthony McClain	7 ft 0 in (2.13 m)	290 lb (132 kg)	Fr	National Christian Academy	Trenton, New Jersey
F	32	Kenny Belton	6 ft 8 in (2.03 m)	255 lb (116 kg)	Fr	Dudley High School	Salem, Virginia
G	33	Jamual Warren	6 ft 2 in (1.88 m)	195 lb (88 kg)	Sr	Globe Institute of Technology	Springfield, Massachusetts
C	34	Adam Hrycaniuk	6 ft 10 in (2.08 m)	230 lb (104 kg)	Sr	Trinity Valley CC	Mysliborz, Poland
F	45	John Williamson (C)	6 ft 6 in (1.98 m)	225 lb (102 kg)	Sr	Cincinnati State	Columbus, Ohio

Head coach

- Mick Cronin (Cincinnati)

Assistant coach(es)

- Chris Goggin (Cincinnati)
- Larry Davis (Asbury)
- Tony Stubblefield (Omaha)

Legend

- (C) Team captain
- (S) Suspended
- (I) Ineligible
- (W) Walk-on
- Injured
- Current redshirt

Roster
Last update: 14 May 2020

=== Depth chart ===
Pos.	Starting 5	Bench 1	Bench 2
C	Adam Hrycaniuk	Anthony McClain
PF	John Williamson	Kenny Belton	Alvin Mitchell
SF	Rashad Bishop	Marcus Sikes	Darnell Wilks
SG	Jamual Warren	Larry Davis	Branden Miller
PG	Deonta Vaughn	Marvin Gentry

== Schedule and results ==
Date time, TV	Rank^{#}	Opponent^{#}	Result	Record	Site (attendance) city, state
Exhibition
October 31, 2007*; 7:30pm		Northern Kentucky	W 76–71		Fifth Third Arena; Cincinnati, OH
November 3, 2007*; 7:30pm		Bellarmine	W 77–58		Fifth Third Arena; Cincinnati, OH
Regular Season
November 9, 2007*; 8:00pm		Belmont; Peggy Cronin Classic	L 75–86	0–1	Fifth Third Arena; Cincinnati, OH
November 10, 2007*; 7:00pm		Western Carolina; Peggy Cronin Classic	W 66–64	1–1	Fifth Third Arena; Cincinnati, OH
November 11, 2007*; 8:00pm		Bowling Green; Peggy Cronin Classic	L 67–69	1–2	Fifth Third Arena; Cincinnati, OH
November 16, 2007*; 7:00pm		Coastal Carolina	W 74–59	2–2	Fifth Third Arena; Cincinnati, OH
November 24, 2007*; 1:00pm		Fairfield	W 69–64	3–2	Fifth Third Arena; Cincinnati, OH
November 26, 2007*; 8:00pm		USC Upstate	W 69–57	4–2	Fifth Third Arena; Cincinnati, OH
December 1, 2007*; 6:00pm		at UAB	L 54–73	4–3	Bartow Arena; Birmingham, AL
December 8, 2007*; 8:05pm		at Illinois State	L 52–62	4–4	Redbird Arena; Normal, IL
December 12, 2007*; 7:00pm		at No. 17 Xavier; Crosstown Shootout	L 59–64	4–5	Cintas Center; Cincinnati, OH
December 19, 2007*; 7:00pm		No. 2 Memphis; Rivalry	L 69–79	4–6	Fifth Third Arena; Cincinnati, OH
December 23, 2007*; 7:30pm		at North Carolina State	L 77–85	4–7	RBC Center; Raleigh, NC
December 29, 2007*; 8:00pm		Miami (OH)	W 56–50	5–7	US Bank Arena; Cincinnati, OH
Big East Regular Season
January 1, 2008; 2:30pm		at Louisville; Rivalry	W 58–57	6–7 (1–0)	Freedom Hall; Louisville, KY
January 5, 2008; 6:00pm		at St. John's	L 58–70	6–8 (1–1)	Carnesecca Arena; Queens, NY
January 9, 2008; 8:00pm		Syracuse	W 74–66	7–8 (2–1)	Fifth Third Arena; Cincinnati, OH
January 12, 2008; 7:00pm		No. 19 Villanova	W 69–66	8–8 (3–1)	Fifth Third Arena; Cincinnati, OH
January 15, 2008; 7:00pm, ESPNU		at Notre Dame	L 74–91	8–9 (3–2)	Edmund P. Joyce Center (10,231); South Bend, IN
January 19, 2008; 4:00pm		No. 15 Pittsburgh	W 62–59	9–9 (4–2)	Fifth Third Arena; Cincinnati, OH
January 23, 2008; 7:30pm		Connecticut	L 83–84	9–10 (4–3)	Fifth Third Arena; Cincinnati, OH
January 27, 2008; 12:00pm		at Seton Hall	L 61–64	9–11 (4–4)	Prudential Center; Newark, NJ
January 30, 2008; 7:00pm		at West Virginia	W 62–39	10–11 (5–4)	WVU Coliseum; Morgantown, WV
February 2, 2008; 12:00pm		No. 17 Marquette	L 60–75	10–12 (5–5)	Fifth Third Arena; Cincinnati, OH
February 9, 2008; 6:00pm		at Rutgers	W 72–68 ^{OT}	11–12 (6–5)	The RAC; Piscataway, NJ
February 13, 2008; 7:00pm		St. John's	W 60–43	12–12 (7–5)	Fifth Third Arena; Cincinnati, OH
February 20, 2008; 7:00pm		South Florida	W 52–51	13–12 (8–5)	Fifth Third Arena; Cincinnati, OH
February 23, 2008; 12:00pm, MASN		at No. 12 Georgetown	L 53–73	13–13 (8–6)	Verizon Center (17,337); Washington, D.C.
February 27, 2008; 7:30pm		Pittsburgh	L 67–73	13–14 (8–7)	Petersen Events Center; Pittsburgh, PA
March 2, 2008; 12:00pm		Providence	L 79–81 ^{OT}	13–15 (8–8)	Fifth Third Arena; Cincinnati, OH
March 6, 2008; 7:30pm		DePaul	L 54–60	13–16 (8–9)	Fifth Third Arena; Cincinnati, OH
March 9, 2008; 6:00pm		at No. 13 UConn	L 51–96	13–17 (8–10)	Harry A. Gampel Pavilion; Storrs, CT
Big East tournament
Mar 12, 2008; 7:00pm	(10)	vs. (7) Pittsburgh; First Round	L 64–70	13–18	Madison Square Garden; New York, NY
College Basketball Invitational
Mar 19, 2008*; 7:00pm	(M 4)	at (M 1) Bradley; First Round	L 67–70	13–19	Carver Arena; Peoria, IL
*Non-conference game. ^{#}Rankings from AP Poll. (#) Tournament seedings in parentheses. All times are in Eastern Time.
