= 2007–08 West Virginia Mountaineers men's basketball team =

American college basketball season

2007–08 West Virginia Mountaineers men's basketball

NCAA tournament, Sweet Sixteen
- Conference: Big East Conference|Big East

Ranking
- Coaches: No. 17
- Record: 26–11 (11–7 Big East)
- Head coach: Bob Huggins (1st season)
- Home arena: WVU Coliseum

2007–08 Big East men's basketball standings
	Conf.				Overall
Team	W		L	PCT	W		L	PCT
No. 8 Georgetown	15	–	3	.833	28	–	6	.824
No. 13 Louisville	14	–	4	.778	27	–	9	.750
No. 15 Notre Dame	14	–	4	.778	25	–	8	.758
No. 16 Connecticut	13	–	5	.722	24	–	9	.727
West Virginia	11	–	7	.611	26	–	11	.703
No. 25 Marquette	11	–	7	.611	25	–	10	.714
No. 17 Pittsburgh†	10	–	8	.556	27	–	10	.730
Villanova	9	–	9	.500	22	–	13	.629
Syracuse	9	–	9	.500	21	–	14	.600
Cincinnati	8	–	10	.444	13	–	19	.406
Seton Hall	7	–	11	.389	17	–	15	.531
Providence	6	–	12	.333	15	–	16	.484
*DePaul	6	–	12	.333	11	–	19	.367
*St. John's	5	–	13	.278	11	–	19	.367
*South Florida	3	–	15	.167	12	–	19	.387
*Rutgers	3	–	15	.167	11	–	20	.355
† 2008 Big East tournament winner As of April 7, 2008; Rankings from AP Poll; *Did not qualify for 2008 Big East tournament.

The 2007–08 West Virginia Mountaineers men's basketball team represented West Virginia University in the 2007-08 NCAA Division I men's basketball season. The team was coached by Bob Huggins and played their home games in the WVU Coliseum in Morgantown, West Virginia. It completed the season 26–11 (11–7 in the Big East) and lost to Xavier 79–75 (in overtime) in the Sweet Sixteen of the 2008 NCAA tournament. West Virginia finished the season ranked #17.

== Roster ==
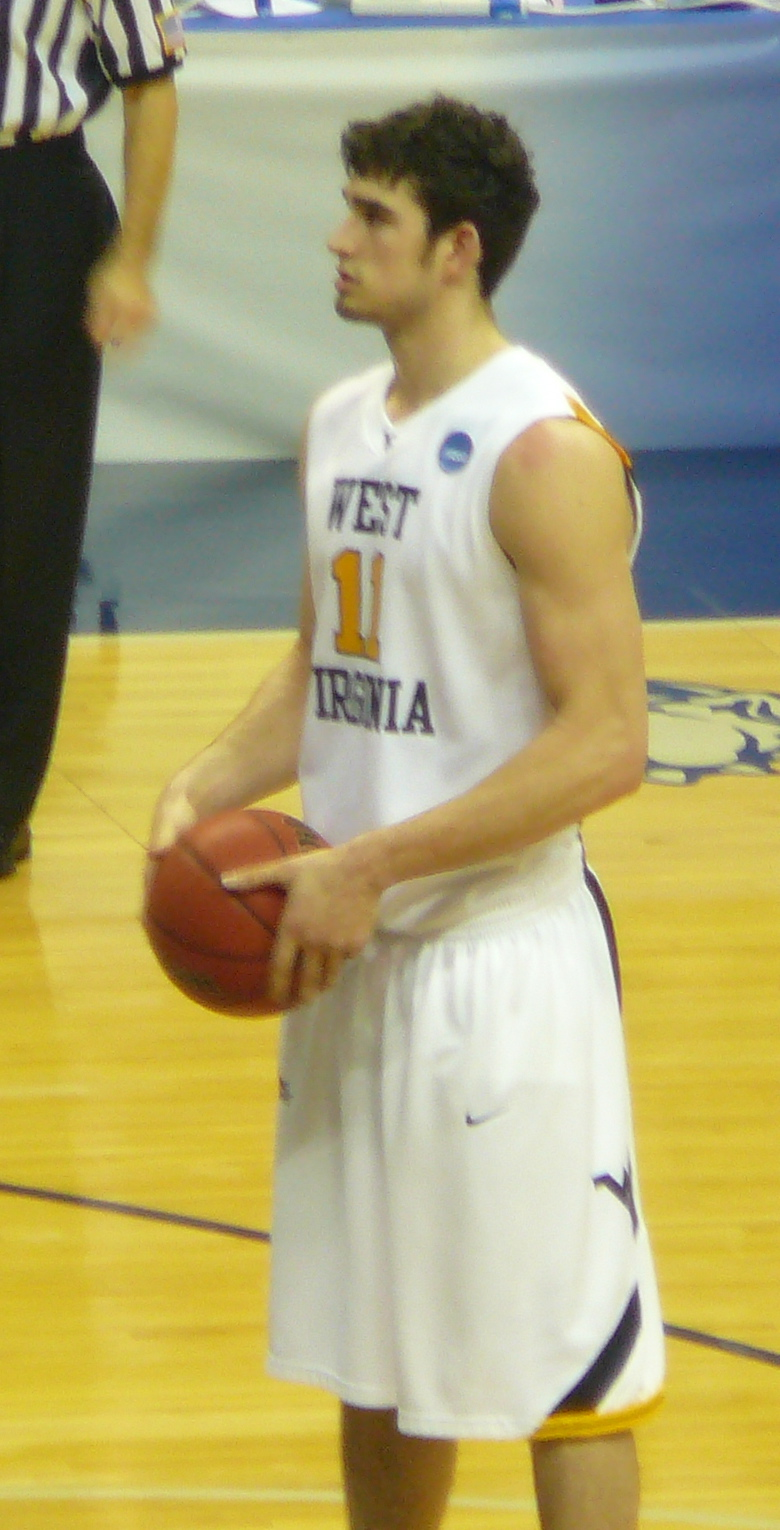
Joe Alexander

Name	Number	Position	Height	Weight	Year	Hometown
Joe Alexander	11	F	6-8	225	Junior	Mount Airy, Maryland
Jarrett Brown	31	G	6-4	220	Sophomore	West Palm Beach, Florida
Da'Sean Butler	1	F	6-7	225	Sophomore	Newark, New Jersey
John Flowers	41	F	6-7	195	Freshman	Waldorf, Maryland
Joe Mazzulla	3	G	6-2	210	Sophomore	Johnston, Rhode Island
Darris Nichols	14	G	6-3	200	Senior	Radford, Virginia
Cameron Payne	25	G	6-4	200	Freshman	Charleston, West Virginia
Alex Ruoff	22	G	6-6	215	Junior	Spring Hill, Florida
Jamie Smalligan	43	C	7-0	265	Senior	East Grand Rapids, Michigan
Wellington Smith	35	F	6-7	215	Sophomore	Summit, New Jersey
Josh Sowards	21	F	6-7	205	Sophomore	Scott Depot, West Virginia
Ted Talkington	32	G	6-2	200	Junior	New Martinsville, West Virginia
Will Thomas	24	G	6-5	205	Freshman	East Cleveland, Ohio
Cam Thoroughman	2	F	6-7	215	Freshman	Portsmouth, Ohio
Jonnie West	4	G	6-3	175	Freshman	Memphis, Tennessee

== Schedule and results ==
Date time, TV	Rank^{#}	Opponent^{#}	Result	Record	Site (attendance) city, state
Regular season
November 16, 2007*; 8:00 pm		Arkansas Monticello	W 81–53	1–0	WVU Coliseum (8,371); Morgantown, WV
November 18, 2007*; 3:00 pm		Prairie View A&M	W 106–41	2–0	WVU Coliseum (5,933); Morgantown, WV
November 23, 2007*; 9:00 pm, Versus		vs. No. 7 Tennessee; Legends Classic	L 72–74	2–1	Prudential Center (5,310); Newark, NJ
November 24, 2007*; 4:30 pm		vs. New Mexico State; Legends Classic	W 75–61	3–1	Prudential Center (4,327); Newark, NJ
November 27, 2007*; 7:00 pm		Maryland Eastern Shore	W 110–44	4–1	WVU Coliseum (5,630); Morgantown, WV
December 1, 2007*; 2:00 pm, ESPN2		Winthrop	W 70–53	5–1	WVU Coliseum (8,559); Morgantown, WV
December 5, 2007*; 9:30 pm, ESPN2		at Auburn	W 88–59	6–1	BJCC Arena (10,481); Birmingham, AL
December 8, 2007*; 7:00 pm, ESPN+		Duquesne	W 92–68	7–1	WVU Coliseum (10,071); Morgantown, WV
December 15, 2007*; 4:00 pm		UMBC	W 86–62	8–1	WVU Coliseum (7,026); Morgantown, WV
December 19, 2007*; 7:00 pm, ESPN+	No. 24	at Radford	W 90–60	9–1	Dedmon Center (4,266); Radford, VA
December 22, 2007*; 4:00 pm, ESPN+	No. 24	at Canisius	W 77–54	10–1	HSBC Arena (3,699); Buffalo, NY
December 29, 2007*; 6:00 pm, ESPN2	No. 23	Oklahoma	L 82–88 ^{2OT}	10–2	Charleston Civic Center (12,380); Charleston, WV
January 3, 2008; 7:00 pm, ESPN2		at Notre Dame	L 56–69	10–3 (0–1)	Edmund P. Joyce Center (8,327); Notre Dame, IN
January 6, 2008; 2:00 pm, ESPN+		No. 10 Marquette	W 79–64	11–3 (1–1)	WVU Coliseum (11,429); Morgantown, WV
January 10, 2008; 7:00 pm, ESPN		at Louisville	L 54–63	11–4 (1–2)	Freedom Hall (19,764); Louisville, KY
January 13, 2008; 2:30 pm, ESPNU		Syracuse	W 81–61	12–4 (2–2)	WVU Coliseum (13,560); Morgantown, WV
January 17, 2008; 7:00 pm, ESPN+		St. Johns	W 73–64	13–4 (3–2)	WVU Coliseum (13,047); Morgantown, WV
January 20, 2008; 2:00 pm, ESPN+		at South Florida	W 69–52	14–4 (4–2)	St. Pete Times Forum (12,056); Tampa, FL
January 23, 2008*; 8:00 pm, WV Media		vs. Marshall	W 66–64	15–4	Charleston Civic Center (12,580); Charleston, WV
January 26, 2008; 7:00 pm, ESPN		No. 9 Georgetown	L 57–58	15–5 (4–3)	WVU Coliseum (14,048); Morgantown, WV
January 30, 2008; 7:00 pm, ESPN2		Cincinnati	L 39–62	15–6 (4–4)	WVU Coliseum (10,082); Morgantown, WV
February 2, 2008; 7:00 pm, ESPN+		at Providence	W 77–65	16–6 (5–4)	Dunkin' Donuts Center (12,993); Providence, RI
February 7, 2008; 7:00 pm, ESPN		at No. 21 Pittsburgh; Backyard Brawl	L 54–55	16–7 (5–5)	Petersen Events Center (12,508); Pittsburgh, PA
February 14, 2008; 7:00 pm, ESPN2		Rutgers	W 81–63	17–7 (6–5)	WVU Coliseum (7,826); Morgantown, WV
February 17, 2008; 2:00 pm, ESPN+		Seton Hall	W 89–68	18–7 (7–5)	WVU Coliseum (10,074); Morgantown, WV
February 20, 2008; 8:00 pm, ESPN+		at Villanova	L 56–78	18–8 (7–6)	The Pavilion (6,500); Villanova, PA
February 23, 2008; 7:00 pm, ESPN+		Providence	W 80–53	19–8 (8–6)	WVU Coliseum (11,319); Morgantown, WV
February 27, 2008; 9:00 pm, ESPN2		at DePaul	W 85–73	20–8 (9–6)	Allstate Arena (8,777); Rosemont, IL
March 1, 2008; 12:00 pm, ESPN+		at No. 15 Connecticut	L 71–79	20–9 (9–7)	XL Center (16,294); Hartford, CT
March 3, 2008; 7:00 pm, ESPN		Pittsburgh; Backyard Brawl	W 76–62	21–9 (10–7)	WVU Coliseum (13,960); Morgantown, WV
March 8, 2008; 12:00 pm, ESPN+		at St. John's	W 83–74 ^{OT}	22–9 (11–7)	Madison Square Garden (7,363); New York, NY
Big East tournament
March 12, 2008; 2:00 pm, ESPN		vs. Providence; First Round	W 58–53	23–9	Madison Square Garden (19,562); New York, NY
March 13, 2008; 2:00 pm, ESPN		vs. No. 15 Connecticut; Quarterfinals	W 78–72	24–9	Madison Square Garden (19,562); New York, NY
March 14, 2008; 7:00 pm, ESPN		vs. No. 9 Georgetown; Semifinals	L 55–72	24–10	Madison Square Garden (19,562); New York, NY
NCAA tournament
March 20, 2008*; 9:50 pm, CBS	(7)	vs. (10) Arizona; First Round	W 75–65	25–10	Verizon Center (18,400); Washington, D.C.
March 22, 2008*; 2:10 pm, CBS	(7)	vs. (2) No. 9 Duke; Second Round	W 73–67	26–10	Verizon Center (20,533); Washington, D.C.
March 27, 2008*; 7:10 pm, CBS	(7)	vs. (3) Xavier; Sweet Sixteen	L 75–79 ^{OT}	26–11	US Airways Center (18,103); Phoenix, AZ
*Non-conference game. ^{#}Rankings from Coaches' Poll. (#) Tournament seedings in parentheses.

== Standings ==
Big East	Conference			Overall	
Big East	W-L	GB	PCT	W-L	PCT
#8 Georgetown	15-3	-	.833	27-5	.844
#15 Notre Dame	14-4	1	.778	24-7	.774
#13 Louisville	14-4	1	.778	24-8	.750
#17 Connecticut	13-5	2	.722	24-8	.750
#25 Marquette	11-7	4	.611	24-9	.727
West Virginia	11-7	4	.611	24-10	.706
Pittsburgh	10-8	5	.556	26-9	.743
Villanova	9-9	6	.500	20-12	.625
Syracuse	9-9	6	.500	19-13	.594
Cincinnati	8-10	7	.444	13-18	.419
Seton Hall	7-11	8	.389	17-15	.531
Providence	6-12	9	.333	15-16	.484
DePaul	6-12	9	.333	11-19	.367
St. John's	5-13	10	.278	11-19	.367
South Florida	3-15	12	.167	12-19	.387
Rutgers	3-15	12	.167	11-20	.355
