= 2008 Big East men's basketball tournament =

- 2008 Tournament logo
- Classification: Division I
- Season: 2007–08
- Teams: 12
- Site: Madison Square Garden; New York City
- Champions: Pittsburgh (2nd title)
- Winning coach: Jamie Dixon (1st title)
- MVP: Sam Young (Pittsburgh)
- Top scorer: Sam Young (Pittsburgh) (80 points)

2007–08 Big East men's basketball standings
	Conf.				Overall
Team	W		L	PCT	W		L	PCT
No. 8 Georgetown	15	–	3	.833	28	–	6	.824
No. 13 Louisville	14	–	4	.778	27	–	9	.750
No. 15 Notre Dame	14	–	4	.778	25	–	8	.758
No. 16 Connecticut	13	–	5	.722	24	–	9	.727
West Virginia	11	–	7	.611	26	–	11	.703
No. 25 Marquette	11	–	7	.611	25	–	10	.714
No. 17 Pittsburgh†	10	–	8	.556	27	–	10	.730
Villanova	9	–	9	.500	22	–	13	.629
Syracuse	9	–	9	.500	21	–	14	.600
Cincinnati	8	–	10	.444	13	–	19	.406
Seton Hall	7	–	11	.389	17	–	15	.531
Providence	6	–	12	.333	15	–	16	.484
*DePaul	6	–	12	.333	11	–	19	.367
*St. John's	5	–	13	.278	11	–	19	.367
*South Florida	3	–	15	.167	12	–	19	.387
*Rutgers	3	–	15	.167	11	–	20	.355
† 2008 Big East tournament winner As of April 7, 2008; Rankings from AP Poll; *Did not qualify for 2008 Big East tournament.

The 2008 Big East men's basketball tournament, a part of the 2007-08 NCAA Division I men's basketball season, took place from March 12–March 15, 2008 at Madison Square Garden in New York City. Its winner received the Big East Conference's automatic bid to the 2008 NCAA tournament. It is a single-elimination tournament with four rounds and the four highest seeds received byes in the first round. The 12 Big East teams with the best conference records were invited to participate. Georgetown, the Big East regular season winner, received the number one seed in the tournament.

The first round of the tournament saw no upsets, as each of the higher seeds won their games. However, the second round had three of the four lower seeds winning their games. In the semi-finals, number one seed, Georgetown, easily won, while the seventh seed, Pittsburgh, won in a close game. The two teams played each other for the tournament championship and Pittsburgh was victorious, winning the conference's automatic bid. After the tournament, eight of the teams that participated were invited to the NCAA Tournament. It was Pittsburgh's second Big East tournament championship.

== Before the tournament ==
Before the beginning of the season the league's coaches voted Georgetown, the 2006-07 Big East regular season and tournament winner, and Louisville to share the conference title. Additionally, it was decided that each team's conference schedule would expand from 16 to 18 games so all of the teams would play each other. Fifteen Big East teams reached the beginning of their conference schedules with winning records, with four teams having only one loss and three others with only two losses. The out of conference schedule for the league included four teams playing in the inaugural Big East/SEC Invitational, where they went 3–1, and two teams beating top–10 ranked teams. At the end of conference play, Georgetown, who was ranked tenth in the Coaches Poll, won the regular season title. Six teams ended the season ranked, while eight ended with over 20 wins. The top–12 teams in the standings were invited to the tournament.

2007-08 Big East Conference Standings
Team	Conference Record			Overall	
Team	W	L	GB	W	L
#9 Georgetown	15	3	-	27	5
#14 Notre Dame	14	4	1	24	7
#13 Louisville	14	4	1	24	8
#15 Connecticut	13	5	2	24	8
#24 Marquette	11	7	4	24	9
West Virginia	11	7	4	24	10
Pittsburgh	10	8	5	26	9
Villanova	9	9	6	20	12
Syracuse	9	9	6	19	13
Cincinnati	8	10	7	13	18
Seton Hall	7	11	8	17	15
Providence	6	12	9	15	16
DePaul	6	12	9	11	19
St. John's	5	13	10	11	19
South Florida	3	15	12	12	19
Rutgers	3	15	12	11	20

- Rankings reflect Coaches Poll as of March 10, 2008

== Tournament ==
=== Seeding ===
The twelve teams that were invited to the tournament were seeded according to their records:

- Georgetown's first-place finish in the regular season entitled the team to the top seed.
- Louisville and Notre Dame finished the season tied in second, a game behind Georgetown, but Louisville's win over Notre Dame on February 28 gave it the advantage and the second seed and Notre Dame the third seed.
- Connecticut, two games behind Georgetown, got the fourth seed, and the final first-round bye.
- West Virginia and Marquette both finished four games behind Georgetown in fifth place, but West Virginia's win over Marquette on January 6 granted it the fifth seed and left Marquette with the sixth.
- Pittsburgh finished five games behind Georgetown and was awarded the seventh seed.
- Villanova and Syracuse both finished six games behind Georgetown and split their games against one another in the regular season. After head-to-head results, the tie-breaking rules of the conference next were based on wins over top conference opponents, and, although Syracuse beat Georgetown on February 16, both teams also lost to Georgetown, so Syracuse did not have an advantage over Villanova in games against Georgetown. Tie-breaking then moved to the two teams' results against Connecticut. Villanova's win over Connecticut, coupled with Syracuse's loss, gave Villanova the advantage and the eighth seed and Syracuse the ninth seed.
- Cincinnati, at seven games behind Georgetown, received the tenth seed.
- Seton Hall, at eight games behind Georgetown, received the eleventh seed.
- Providence and DePaul finished nine games behind Georgetown, but Providence's win on February 5, gave the team the twelfth seed, the final position in the tournament.
- The teams finishing below twelfth place after taking the twelfth-seed tiebreaker into account (DePaul, St. John's, South Florida, and Rutgers) did not qualify for the tournament.

=== Bracket ===
First round March 12, 2008
8	Villanova	82
9	Syracuse	63
5	West Virginia	58
12	Providence	53
6	#25 Marquette	67
11	Seton Hall	54
7	Pittsburgh	70
10	Cincinnati	64

Quarterfinals; March 13, 2008
1	#9 Georgetown	82
8	Villanova	63
4	#15 Connecticut	72
5	West Virginia	78
3	#14 Notre Dame	79
6	#25 Marquette	89
2	#13 Louisville	69
7	Pittsburgh	76^{OT}

Semifinals; March 14, 2008
1	#9 Georgetown	72
5	West Virginia	55
6	#25 Marquette	61
7	Pittsburgh	68

Championship Game; March 15, 2008
1	#9 Georgetown	65
7	Pittsburgh	74

=== First round ===
Team	1st	2nd	Final
Villanova	27	55	82
Syracuse	28	35	63

Team	1st	2nd	Final
West Virginia	28	30	58
Providence	28	25	53

Team	1st	2nd	Final
Marquette	34	33	67
Seton Hall	29	25	54

Team	1st	2nd	Final
Pittsburgh	31	39	70
Cincinnati	25	39	64

The first round of the tournament was played on March 12 with each of the higher seeds winning. The day started with Villanova playing Syracuse, in what was called an elimination game for the NCAA Tournament. Although Syracuse held a one-point lead at half-time, Villanova took an early lead in the second half and never trailed again, winning 82–63. In the second game of the day, Providence played West Virginia. The teams both struggled throughout the game with both having scoreless streaks, but West Virginia prevailed in the end to win 58–53. In the third game of the day Cincinnati played Pittsburgh. Although the teams stayed close throughout, Pittsburgh won the game 70–64. In the final game of the day Marquette played Seton Hall. Marquette won the game by holding Seton Hall scoreless through the last five minutes of the game to finish 67–54.

=== Second round ===
Team	1st	2nd	Final
Georgetown	40	42	82
Villanova	29	34	63

Team	1st	2nd	Final
Connecticut	36	36	72
West Virginia	42	36	78

Team	1st	2nd	OT	Final
Louisville	33	29	7	69
Pittsburgh	30	32	14	76

Team	1st	2nd	Final
Notre Dame	38	41	79
Marquette	32	57	89

The second round of the tournament was played on March 13, and three of the four lower seeds won their games. The first game of the day featured Villanova facing the number one seed, Georgetown. Despite top-scorer Roy Hibbert not scoring the entire game, Georgetown won the game, 82–63, tying a tournament record with 17 three-point field goals. In the second game West Virginia played Connecticut. Although it was close for the majority of the game, West Virginia's six point half-time lead was enough to win the game, 78–72, the first upset of the tournament. In the third game Pittsburgh faced Louisville, a team they had knocked out of the tournament the previous two years. Although Pittsburgh had the largest lead in regulation at eight points, the game was tied at the end of the second half and it continued to overtime. Pittsburgh finally pulled away in the overtime period, and won 76–69. In the final game of the round, Marquette played Notre Dame. Notre Dame had a six-point lead at half-time even though conference Player of the Year, Luke Harangody, had only played for seven minutes. However, Marquette's Jerel McNeal, who had 21 points in the team's first win, scored 28 to lead Marquette to an 89–79 victory.

=== Semi-finals ===
Team	1st	2nd	Final
Georgetown	33	39	72
West Virginia	21	34	55

Team	1st	2nd	Final
Marquette	22	39	61
Pittsburgh	35	33	68

The semi-finals began with top-seed Georgetown facing West Virginia. The game was close early, but five minutes before half-time, Georgetown went on a scoring run and led 33–21 at the half. West Virginia came back and brought their deficit to six points halfway through the second period, however Georgetown never relinquished their lead. Led by Hibbert's 25 points in his double-double, Georgetown won 72–55 to return to the championship game for the second consecutive year. In the second game of the day, Marquette faced Pittsburgh. Early in the game Pittsburgh took a 12-point lead and kept a double-digit lead throughout the half. Marquette cut their deficit during the second period and had the score within three points with a minute remaining in the game. However, Pittsburgh kept their lead with free throw shooting and won the game 68–61, advancing to the championship game for the seventh time in eight years.

=== Championship game ===
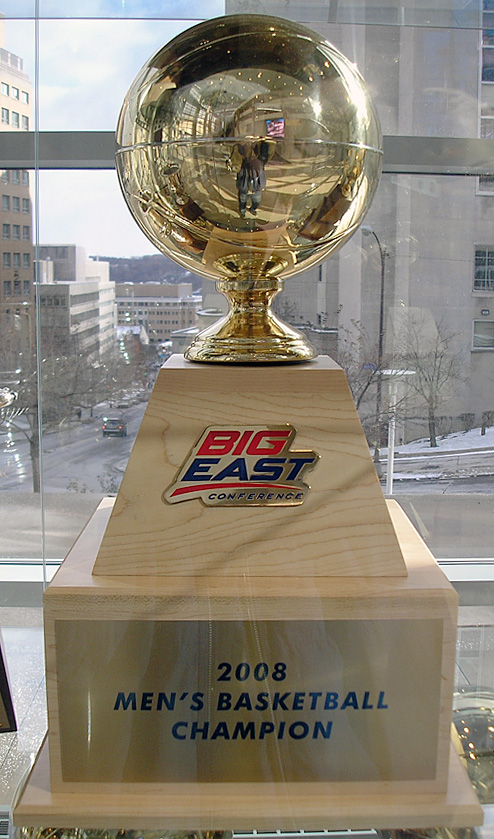
The 2008 Big East tournament trophy on display at the University of Pittsburgh's Petersen Events Center

Team	1st	2nd	Final
Georgetown	28	37	65
Pittsburgh	31	43	74

Pittsburgh faced Georgetown in a repeat of the championship game of the 2007 tournament. Throughout the first half the lead changed hands six times, with Georgetown having the largest lead of six points. Pittsburgh, however, led at half-time by three. Although Georgetown would bring their deficit to two early in the second half, Pittsburgh never relinquished the lead after half-time. Pittsburgh's Sam Young led the team with a double-double to help secure their win, the school's second overall and first for coach Jamie Dixon.

=== Awards ===
After the championship game Sam Young, who led Pittsburgh to the win and led the tournament in scoring with 80 points, was named the tournament's Most Valuable Player. Young was joined by his teammate Levance Fields, Georgetown's Jessie Sapp and Roy Hibbert, West Virginia's Joe Alexander, and Marquette's Jerel McNeal to the All-Tournament Team.

== After the tournament ==
In addition to Pittsburgh's automatic bid to the NCAA Tournament, seven other conference teams were given at-large bids in the field, tying the conference record of eight teams in the tournament. Georgetown got the highest seed of the conference with a 2 seed and Louisville got a 3 seed. Both Pittsburgh and Connecticut were given 4 seeds and Notre Dame got a 5 seed. Marquette was given a 6 seed and West Virginia got a 7 seed. Finally, Villanova was given a 12 seed and was the final at-large team invited to the tournament. Although Syracuse was not invited to the NCAA Tournament, they were the only team from the conference invited to the 2008 National Invitation Tournament.
