= 2007–08 Villanova Wildcats men's basketball team =

American college basketball season

2007–08 Villanova Wildcats men's basketball

NCAA Tournament, Sweet Sixteen
- Conference: Big East Conference

Ranking
- Coaches: No. 24
- Record: 22–13 (9–9 Big East)
- Head coach: Jay Wright
- Assistant coaches: Brett Gunning; Pat Chambers; Doug West
- Home arena: The Pavilion

2007–08 Big East men's basketball standings
	Conf.				Overall
Team	W		L	PCT	W		L	PCT
No. 8 Georgetown	15	–	3	.833	28	–	6	.824
No. 13 Louisville	14	–	4	.778	27	–	9	.750
No. 15 Notre Dame	14	–	4	.778	25	–	8	.758
No. 16 Connecticut	13	–	5	.722	24	–	9	.727
West Virginia	11	–	7	.611	26	–	11	.703
No. 25 Marquette	11	–	7	.611	25	–	10	.714
No. 17 Pittsburgh†	10	–	8	.556	27	–	10	.730
Villanova	9	–	9	.500	22	–	13	.629
Syracuse	9	–	9	.500	21	–	14	.600
Cincinnati	8	–	10	.444	13	–	19	.406
Seton Hall	7	–	11	.389	17	–	15	.531
Providence	6	–	12	.333	15	–	16	.484
*DePaul	6	–	12	.333	11	–	19	.367
*St. John's	5	–	13	.278	11	–	19	.367
*South Florida	3	–	15	.167	12	–	19	.387
*Rutgers	3	–	15	.167	11	–	20	.355
† 2008 Big East tournament winner As of April 7, 2008; Rankings from AP Poll; *Did not qualify for 2008 Big East tournament.

The Villanova Wildcats entered the 2007–08 season with much uncertainty, after losing star Curtis Sumpter, guard Mike Nardi, and center Will Sheridan to graduation. The departure of three experienced starters left the Wildcats a young team with no seniors. Villanova replaced those starters with three freshmen: Parade All-American Corey Fisher, McDonald's All-American Corey Stokes, and Malcolm Grant. Returning players included sophomore Scottie Reynolds and juniors Shane Clark and Dante Cunningham. The team also featured Antonio Pena and Andrew Ott, both returning from redshirt freshman years.

The 2007–08 schedule included 18 Big East contests, a trip to Orlando, Florida for the Old Spice Classic, a home game against LSU in the Big East/SEC Invitational, four games against Big Five rivals, and home games against Stony Brook, Bucknell, Hartford, and Columbia.

Villanova finished the regular season with a record of 19–11 overall and 9–9 in the Big East.

The Wildcats received a #12 seed in the 2008 NCAA tournament in which they defeated the #5 seed Clemson Tigers and the #13 seed Siena Saints. They reached the Sweet Sixteen before they were defeated by #1 seed Kansas 72–57 on March 28, 2008. This was the third time in 4 years that Villanova was eliminated from the tournament by the eventual champion. In 2005, Villanova reached the Sweet 16 before being defeated by eventual tournament champion North Carolina. In 2006, Villanova reached the Sweet Sixteen before being defeated by eventual champion Kansas. The team finished with a 22–13 record, and 10–10 record in the Big East.

== Class of 2007 ==
College recruiting
Name	Hometown	School	Height	Weight	Commit date
Corey Fisher; PG	Elizabeth, NJ	St. Patrick HS	5 ft 11 in (1.80 m)	170 lb (77 kg)	Jan 12, 2006
Corey Fisher; PG	Recruit ratings: Scout: Rivals: (97)				
Malcolm Grant; PG	Winchendon, MA	The Winchendon School	6 ft 1 in (1.85 m)	170 lb (77 kg)	Nov 2, 2006
Malcolm Grant; PG	Recruit ratings: Scout: Rivals: (93)				
Corey Stokes; SG	Newark, NJ	St. Benedict Prep	6 ft 5 in (1.96 m)	185 lb (84 kg)	Jun 10, 2006
Corey Stokes; SG	Recruit ratings: Scout: Rivals: (97)				
Overall Recruiting Rankings: Scout – 20 Rivals – 12 ESPN –

== Roster ==
Villanova Basketball; 2007–08 Roster
G/F	22	Dwayne Anderson	JR	Washington, DC (St. Thomas More)
F	20	Shane Clark	JR	Philadelphia, PA (Hargrave Military Academy)
G	4	Jason Colenda	FR	Fairfax, VA (Bishop O'Connell)
F	33	Dante Cunningham	JR	Silver Spring, MD (Potomac)
C	5	Cassiem Drummond	SO	West Orange, NJ (Bloomfield Tech)
G	10	Corey Fisher	FR	Bronx, NY (St. Patrick's, NJ)
G	3	Malcolm Grant	FR	Brooklyn, NY (Winchendon Academy, MA)
F	0	Antonio Pena	FR	Brooklyn, NY (St. Thomas More)
G	15	Reggie Redding	SO	Philadelphia, PA (St. Joseph's Prep)
G	1	Scottie Reynolds	SO	Herndon, VA (Herndon)
G	24	Corey Stokes	FR	Bayone, NJ (St. Benedict's)
F	42	Frank Tchuisi	JR	Douala, Cameroon (St. Benedict's)

== Coaching staff ==
Jay Wright – Head Coach

Brett Gunning – Associate Head Coach

Patrick Chambers – Assistant Coach

Doug West – Assistant Coach

== Schedule ==
Date	Opponent	rank	Location	Time	Result	Overall	Conf.
**Regular Season**
November 9, 2007	Stony Brook	25	Villanova, PA	7:00 PM ET	W 86–64	1–0	0–0
November 18, 2007	Bucknell	23	Villanova, PA	5:00 PM ET	W 70–64	2–0	0–0
November 22, 2007	@ UCF (Old Spice Classic)	19	Orlando, FL	7:00 PM ET	W 76–68	3–0	0–0
November 23, 2007	George Mason (Old Spice Classic)	19	Orlando, FL	5:00 PM ET	W 84–76	4–0	0–0
November 25, 2007	N.C. State (Old Spice Classic)	19	Orlando, FL	6:30 PM ET	L 68–69	4–1	0–0
December 1, 2007	Pennsylvania	21	Villanova, PA	7:00 PM ET	W 87–61	5–1	0–0
December 6, 2007	LSU (Big East/SEC Invitational)	21	Philadelphia, PA	9:30 PM ET	W 68–67	6–1	0–0
December 9, 2007	@ Temple	21	Philadelphia, PA	7:00 PM ET	W 101–93	7–1	0–0
December 14, 2007	Hartford	18	Villanova, PA	7:00 PM ET	W 103–75	8–1	0–0
December 22, 2007	Columbia	17	Villanova, PA	7:00 PM ET	W 72–56	9–1	0–0
December 29, 2007	La Salle	16	Villanova, PA	7:00 PM ET	W 71–58	10–1	0–0
January 3, 2008	@ **DePaul**	16	Chicago, IL	9:00 PM ET	L 76–81	10–2	0–1
January 6, 2008	**#13 Pittsburgh**	16	Villanova, PA	12:00 PM ET	W 64–63	11–2	1–1
January 12, 2008	@ **Cincinnati**	17	Cincinnati, OH	7:00 PM ET	L 66–69	11–3	1–2
January 16, 2008	**DePaul**	21	Villanova, PA	9:00 PM ET	W 76–69	12–3	2–2
January 19, 2008	@ **Syracuse**	21	Syracuse, NY	12:00 PM ET	W 81–71	13–3	3–2
January 23, 2008	@ **Rutgers**	18	Piscataway, NJ	7:00 PM ET	L 68–80	13–4	3–3
January 26, 2008	**Notre Dame**	18	Philadelphia, PA	12:00 PM ET	L 80–90	13–5	3–4
January 30, 2008	@ **#21 Pittsburgh**		Pittsburgh, PA	7:00 PM ET	L 57–69	13–6	3–5
February 2, 2008	**Syracuse**		Philadelphia, PA	12:00 PM ET	L 73–87	13–7	3–6
February 4, 2008	@ St. Joseph's		Philadelphia, PA	8:00 PM ET	L 55–77	13–8	3–6
February 9, 2008	**Seton Hall**		Villanova, PA	6:00 PM ET	W 72–70	14–8	4–6
February 11, 2008	@ **#8 Georgetown**		Washington, DC	7:00 PM ET	L 55–53	14–9	4–7
February 16, 2008	@ **St. John's**		New York, NY	8:00 PM ET	W 60–42	15–9	5–7
February 20, 2008	**West Virginia**		Villanova, PA	8:00 PM ET	W 78–56	16–9	6–7
February 23, 2008	**#13 Connecticut**		Philadelphia, PA	12:00 PM ET	W 67–65	17–9	7–7
February 25, 2008	**#21 Marquette**		Philadelphia, PA	7:00 PM ET	L 75–85	17–10	7–8
March 2, 2008	@ **#18 Louisville**		Louisville, KY	4:00 PM ET	L 54–68	17–11	7–9
March 5, 2008	**USF**		Villanova, PA	8:00 PM ET	W 72–59	18–11	8–9
March 8, 2008	@ **Providence**		Providence, RI	7:30 PM ET	W 73–63	19–11	9–9
**Big East tournament**
March 12, 2008	Syracuse		New York, NY	12:00 PM ET	W 82–63	20–11	
March 13, 2008	#9 Georgetown		New York, NY	12:00 PM ET	L 63–82	20–12	
**NCAA tournament**
March 21, 2008	#22 (5*) Clemson	(12)	Tampa, FL	9:50 PM ET	W 75–69	21–12	
March 23, 2008	(#13*) Siena	(12)	Tampa, FL	12:10 PM ET	W 84–72	22–12	
March 28, 2008	#4 (1*) Kansas	(12)	Detroit, MI	9:40 PM ET	L 72–57	22–13	
Big East regular season games in **bold**. • Philadelphia Big Five games in italics. • * represent seedings in NCAA Tournament.

== Game summaries ==
Villanova 64-Pittsburgh 63, Villanova, PA, January 6, 2008

Two free throws by Dante Cunningham with 10.3 seconds remaining lifted the number 17 Villanova Wildcats over the number 13 Pitt Panthers. Freshman Malcolm Grant came off the bench to score a career-high 22, and Antonio Pena added twelve points and three steals.

DePaul 81-Villanova 76, Chicago, IL, January 3, 2008

Villanova dropped the first game of the Big East season to DePaul, 81–76. Corey Fisher scored 23 for the 17th-ranked Wildcats. Dante Cunningham added 14 points and seven rebounds.

Villanova 71-La Salle 58, Villanova, PA, December 29, 2007

18th-Ranked Villanova won its 14th consecutive Big Five game with a 71–58 victory of La Salle. Scottie Reynolds led the Wildcats with 19 points, and freshman Corey Fisher contributed with 18 points and five assists. The win lifts Villanova's Big Five record to 3–0.

Villanova 72-Columbia 56, Villanova, PA, December 22, 2007

20th-Ranked Villanova defeated Columbia 72–56 at Villanova. Shane Clark led the Wildcats with 15 points. Scottie Reynolds added 14, and Dante Cunningham registered nine points and twelve rebounds.

Villanova 103-Hartford 75, Villanova, PA, December 14, 2007

Villanova scored over 100 points in two consecutive games for the second time in school history as the Wildcats defeated Hartford 103–75. Five Wildcats scored in double figures, led by Scottie Reynolds' 21. Dante Cunningham contributed 13 points and 13 rebounds, and Corey Fisher scored 18, including four 3-pointers.

Villanova 101-Temple 93, Philadelphia, PA, December 9, 2007

Villanova set a Big Five record with its 13th consecutive Big Five victory, a 101–93 win over Temple at Temple University. The Wildcats were led by sophomore Scottie Reynolds, who posted 27 points and nine assists. Freshman Antonio Pena scored a career-high 17 points. Villanova's 101 points is the most ever allowed by Temple at the Liacouras Center.

Villanova 68-LSU 67, Philadelphia, PA, December 6, 2007

Villanova's first lead came in the game's final seconds as the Wildcats scored an improbable come-from-behind victory against the LSU Tigers. Led by freshman Malcolm Grant, who scored 13 points in the final three minutes of the game, the Wildcats overcame a 21-point deficit in the Big East/SEC Challenge. Grant finished with 18 points, and Dante Cunningham contributed 13 for Villanova, including the winning basket with 5.9 seconds remaining. The Wildcats' comeback came after LSU's Anthony Randolph fouled out with four minutes remaining.

Villanova 87-Pennsylvania 61, Villanova, PA, December 1, 2007

The Wildcats tied a record with their 12th consecutive Big 5 victory, an 87–61 win over Penn. Scottie Reynolds led Villanova with 21 points, Corey Fisher added 13, and Antonio Pena contributed with 12 points.

North Carolina State 69-Villanova 68, Orlando, FL, November 25, 2007

Villanova suffered its first defeat of the season, as North Carolina State won the championship of the Old Spice Classic 68–68. Gavin Grant sealed the victory for N.C. State as he sunk two of three free throws with 0.4 seconds remaining following a controversial foul call. Villanova's Dante Cunningham tipped in a missed shot with 2.2 seconds remaining to bring Villanova to a one-point lead. Grant, receiving the long inbounds pass at the three-point line, launched a shot. Referee Jim Burr ruled that Cunningham hit Grant on the left arm, resulting in three free throws.

Villanova's effort was marked by poor free throw shooting, and only two successful three-point attempts. Freshman Corey Fisher scored 21 points, and sophomore Scottie Reynolds contributed 13. Cassiem Drummond grabbed a career-high 17 rebounds.

Villanova 84-George Mason 76, Orlando, FL, November 23, 2007

20th Ranked Villaova, led by Scottie Reynolds' 21 points, defeated George Mason 84–76 in the semi-final round of the Old Spice Classic. Malcolm Grant and Shane Clark each added 13 points, and Clark grabbed ten rebounds in the victory. The Wildcats will face N.C. State in the championship game.

Villanova 76-UCF 68, Orlando, FL, November 22, 2007

Scottie Reynolds led Villanova with 19 points, and freshman Corey Fisher scored 18 in his second collegiate game as Villanova topped UCF 76–68 on Thanksgiving night in the opening round of the Old Spice Classic. Sophomore Reggie Redding added 14 points for the 20th ranked Wildcats. Villanova's win sets up a second-round matchup with George Mason, which upset 18th ranked Kansas State. This game marked the first-ever meeting between the two programs.

Villanova 70-Bucknell 64, Villanova, PA, November 18, 2007

Shane Clark posted 17 points and 12 rebounds, as number 24 Villanova held off Bucknell. Scottie Reynolds added 15 points, and sophomore Reggie Redding had a career-high 12 points.

Villanova 86-Stony Brook 64, Villanova, PA, November 9, 2007

Shane Clark scored a career-high 25 points and grabbed seven rebounds as the Wildcats won their 40th consecutive home opener. Freshman Malcolm Grant scored 16 points, including four three-pointers, in his college debut. Dante Cunningham registered 14 points and six rebounds, and Scottie Reynolds added 13 points and six assists.
