= 2007–08 Notre Dame Fighting Irish men's basketball team =

American college basketball season

2007–08 Notre Dame Fighting Irish men's basketball

NCAA tournament, second round
- Conference: Big East Conference

Ranking
- Coaches: No. 19
- AP: No. 15
- Record: 25–8 (14–4 Big East)
- Head coach: Mike Brey (8th season)
- Assistant coaches: Sean Kearney; Gene Cross; Rod Balanis
- Home arena: Edmund P. Joyce Center

2007–08 Big East men's basketball standings
| | Conf. | | | | Overall |
| Team | W | | L | PCT | W | | L | PCT |
|---|---|---|---|---|---|---|---|---|
| No. 8 Georgetown | 15 | – | 3 | .833 | 28 | – | 6 | .824 |
| No. 13 Louisville | 14 | – | 4 | .778 | 27 | – | 9 | .750 |
| No. 15 Notre Dame | 14 | – | 4 | .778 | 25 | – | 8 | .758 |
| No. 16 Connecticut | 13 | – | 5 | .722 | 24 | – | 9 | .727 |
| West Virginia | 11 | – | 7 | .611 | 26 | – | 11 | .703 |
| No. 25 Marquette | 11 | – | 7 | .611 | 25 | – | 10 | .714 |
| No. 17 Pittsburgh† | 10 | – | 8 | .556 | 27 | – | 10 | .730 |
| Villanova | 9 | – | 9 | .500 | 22 | – | 13 | .629 |
| Syracuse | 9 | – | 9 | .500 | 21 | – | 14 | .600 |
| Cincinnati | 8 | – | 10 | .444 | 13 | – | 19 | .406 |
| Seton Hall | 7 | – | 11 | .389 | 17 | – | 15 | .531 |
| Providence | 6 | – | 12 | .333 | 15 | – | 16 | .484 |
| *DePaul | 6 | – | 12 | .333 | 11 | – | 19 | .367 |
| *St. John's | 5 | – | 13 | .278 | 11 | – | 19 | .367 |
| *South Florida | 3 | – | 15 | .167 | 12 | – | 19 | .387 |
| *Rutgers | 3 | – | 15 | .167 | 11 | – | 20 | .355 |
† 2008 Big East tournament winner As of April 7, 2008; Rankings from AP Poll; *Did not qualify for 2008 Big East tournament.

The 2007–08 Notre Dame Fighting Irish men's basketball team represented the University of Notre Dame in the college basketball season of 2007–08, competing in the Big East Conference. The team was led by eighth-year head coach, Mike Brey, and played their home games in the Edmund P. Joyce Center in Notre Dame, Indiana.

The previous year's team finished with a 24–8 record and 11–5 record in Big East games. They competed in the 2007 Big East men's basketball tournament and received an at-large bid to the 2007 National Collegiate Athletic Association (NCAA) Division I men's basketball tournament, where they lost their first game. The team graduated its two top-scorers between the seasons, but returned three starters and added four recruits for 2007–08. They were picked to finish ninth in the Big East.

Notre Dame began the season playing an out-of-conference schedule that included the Paradise Jam tournament, and reached their conference games with a 10–2 record. The team was ranked 14th in the Associated Press (AP) Poll and 15th in the Coaches Poll, and had a 24–7 record overall. The 14–4 record in conference placed the team tied for second in the conference, and was the most conference wins in the history of the school. Dating to 2006, the team won 37 consecutive home games, the second longest active winning streak in the nation.

== Preseason ==
The 2006-07 Notre Dame team finished their season with a 24–8 record that included a loss in the first round of the NCAA tournament. The Irish made the NCAA tournament for the first time since 2003, and the 24 wins tied the 1973–74 team for the most ever wins at Notre Dame. Because of the team's accomplishments, Mike Brey was named Big East Coach of the Year.

=== Roster changes and recruiting ===
Notre Dame lost its two top scorers, Russell Carter and Colin Falls, to graduation in 2007. Freshman Joe Harden, who played in only 14 games throughout the season, decided to transfer from Notre Dame. Kyle McAlarney, a junior, who was suspended for most of the 2006–07 season because of an arrest, was reinstated onto the team. With McAlarney's return, the team returned four former starters.

The Irish signed four recruits for their new class. Although the class was not highly ranked, it included two three–star athletes.

College recruiting
| Name | Hometown | School | Height | Weight | Commit date |
|---|---|---|---|---|---|
| Tim Abromaitis; SF | Farmington, CT | Farmington High School | 6 ft 7 in (2.01 m) | 210 lb (95 kg) | Oct 27, 2006 |
| Tim Abromaitis; SF | Recruit ratings: Scout: Rivals: (81) | | | | |
| Tyrone Nash; F | Northfield, MA | Northfield Mount Hermon School | 6 ft 6 in (1.98 m) | 205 lb (93 kg) | Oct 23, 2006 |
| Tyrone Nash; F | Recruit ratings: Scout: Rivals: (80) | | | | |
| Ty Proffitt; PG | London, KY | South Laurel High School | 6 ft 3 in (1.91 m) | 190 lb (86 kg) | Oct 25, 2006 |
| Ty Proffitt; PG | Recruit ratings: Scout: Rivals: (80) | | | | |
| Carleton Scott; PF | San Antonio, TX | Madison High School | 6 ft 8 in (2.03 m) | 200 lb (91 kg) | Aug 12, 2006 |
| Carleton Scott; PF | Recruit ratings: Scout: Rivals: (85) | | | | |
Overall recruit ranking: Scout: NR Rivals: NR
Note: In many cases, Scout, Rivals, 247Sports, On3, and ESPN may conflict in their listings of height and weight.; In these cases, the average was taken. ESPN grades are on a 100-point scale.; Sources: "Notre Dame 2007 Basketball Commitments". Rivals.; "2007 Notre Dame Commits". Scout.; "2007 Player Commitments - Notre Dame". ESPN.; "Scout.com Team Recruiting Rankings". Scout.; "2007 Team Ranking". Rivals.

=== Pre-season outlook ===
With three former starters who had experience in the NCAA tournament, the Irish hoped to have another run to the tournament. However, with only five returning upperclassmen, including only one senior, the Big East's coaches picked the team to finish ninth in the conference. Even so, the team entered the season with a 20 home game winning streak, dating to the end of the 2005–06 season.

== Regular season ==
=== Roster ===
Notre Dame began the season with 12 scholarship players and two walk-ons. Rob Kurz, the only senior on the team, was named team captain prior to the season. In the 2006–07 season, Tory Jackson took over the point guard position after Kyle McAlarney was suspended. With McAlarney's return, Brey dissolved the position, and both are listed as guards.

| Name | Number | Position | Year | Hometown |
|---|---|---|---|---|
| Tim Abromaitis | 21 | F | Freshman | Farmington, CT |
| Tim Andree | 41 | F | Sophomore | Colts Neck, NJ |
| Ryan Ayers | 42 | F/G | Junior | Blue Bell, PA |
| Luke Harangody | 44 | F | Sophomore | Schererville, IN |
| Zach Hillesland | 33 | F | Junior | Toledo, OH |
| Tory Jackson | 2 | G | Sophomore | Saginaw, MI |
| Tom Kopko | 5 | G | Freshman | Chicago, IL |
| Rob Kurz | 31 | F | Senior | Lower Gwynedd Township, PA |
| Kyle McAlarney | 23 | G | Junior | Staten Island, NY |
| Tyrone Nash | 1 | G | Freshman | Queens, NY |
| Jonathan Peoples | 20 | G | Sophomore | Bellwood, IL |
| Ty Proffitt | 13 | G | Freshman | London, KY |
| Carleton Scott | 34 | F | Freshman | San Antonio, TX |
| Luke Zeller | 40 | F/C | Junior | Washington, IN |

=== Coaches ===
Notre Dame was coached by Mike Brey and his staff. In his eighth year in the position, Brey accumulated a 142–78 (.646) record at Notre Dame before the season.

| Name | Type | College | Year |
|---|---|---|---|
| Mike Brey | Head coach | George Washington | 1982 |
| Sean Kearney | Associate head coach | Scranton | 1981 |
| Rod Balanis | Assistant coach | Georgia Tech | 1993 |
| Gene Cross | Assistant coach | Illinois | 1994 |
| Martin Ingelsby | Coordinator of basketball operations | Notre Dame | 2001 |

=== Schedule ===
Notre Dame's schedule was announced on September 5, 2007. The Big East expanded all of its teams' schedules from 16 to 18 games in conference, so that all of the teams would play each other. Notre Dame added 12 games out of conference to precede them. Notre Dame played 17 home games, eight away games, and four games on a neutral court, prior to the Big East tournament.

| Date time, TV | Rank^{#} | Opponent^{#} | Result | Record | Site (attendance) city, state |
|---|---|---|---|---|---|
| November 12, 2007*; 7:30 p.m. | | Long Island | W 82–50 | 1–0 | Edmund P. Joyce Center (8,873); Notre Dame, IN |
| November 16, 2007*; 8:30 p.m. | | vs. Monmouth; Paradise Jam tournament | W 76–33 | 2–0 | Sports and Fitness Center (2,132); St. Thomas, U.S. Virgin Islands |
| November 18, 2007*; 8:30 p.m. | | vs. Baylor; Paradise Jam Tournament | L 68–64 | 2–1 | Sports and Fitness Center (2,339); St. Thomas, U.S. Virgin Islands |
| November 19, 2007*; 6:00 p.m. | | vs. Georgia Tech; Paradise Jam Tournament | L 70–69 | 2–2 | Sports and Fitness Center (3,325); St. Thomas, U.S. Virgin Islands |
| November 24, 2007*; 7:30 p.m. | | Youngstown State | W 87–75 | 3–2 | Edmund P. Joyce Center (7,461); Notre Dame, IN |
| November 26, 2007*; 7:30 p.m. | | Colgate | W 94–63 | 4–2 | Edmund P. Joyce Center (8,977); Notre Dame, IN |
| December 1, 2007*; 7:00 p.m. | | Eastern Michigan | W 76–65 | 5–2 | Edmund P. Joyce Center (9,277); Notre Dame, IN |
| December 4, 2007*; 7:00 p.m., ESPN | | vs. Kansas State; Jimmy V Classic | W 68–59 | 6–2 | Madison Square Garden (8,300); New York, NY |
| December 8, 2007*; 7:00 p.m. | | Northern Illinois | W 108–62 | 7–2 | Edmund P. Joyce Center (10,142); Notre Dame, IN |
| December 22, 2007*; 4:00 p.m. | | San Francisco | W 84–76 | 8–2 | Edmund P. Joyce Center (8,048); Notre Dame, IN |
| December 29, 2007*; 7:00 p.m. | | Brown | W 87–54 | 9–2 | Edmund P. Joyce Center (8,386); Notre Dame, IN |
| December 31, 2007*; 1:00 p.m. | | North Florida | W 77–58 | 10–2 | Edmund P. Joyce Center (7,841); Notre Dame, IN |
| January 3, 2008; 7:00 p.m., ESPN2 | | West Virginia | W 69–56 | 11–2 (1–0) | Edmund P. Joyce Center (8,327); Notre Dame, IN |
| January 5, 2008; 9:00 p.m., ESPN | | Connecticut | W 73–67 | 12–2 (2–0) | Edmund P. Joyce Center (10,505); Notre Dame, IN |
| January 12, 2008; 2:00 p.m. | | at No. 16 Marquette | L 92–66 | 12–3 (2–1) | Bradley Center (18,906); Milwaukee, WI |
| January 15, 2008; 7:00 p.m., ESPNU | | Cincinnati | W 91–74 | 13–3 (3–1) | Edmund P. Joyce Center (10,231); Notre Dame, IN |
| January 19, 2008; 12:00 p.m., MASN | | at No. 6 Georgetown | L 84–65 | 13–4 (3–2) | Verizon Center (19,286); Washington, D.C. |
| January 26, 2008; 12:00 p.m. | | at No. 18 Villanova | W 90–80 | 14–4 (4–2) | Wachovia Center (19,989); Philadelphia, PA |
| January 31, 2008; 7:00 p.m., ESPN | | Providence | W 81–74 ^{OT} | 15–4 (5–2) | Edmund P. Joyce Center (10,179); Notre Dame, IN |
| February 2, 2008; 6:00 p.m., ESPN Classic | | DePaul | W 89–80 | 16–4 (6–2) | Edmund P. Joyce Center (11,418); Notre Dame, IN |
| February 6, 2008; 7:30 p.m. | No. 21 | at Seton Hall | W 95–69 | 17–4 (7–2) | Prudential Center (9,800); Newark, NJ |
| February 9, 2008; 12:00 p.m., ESPN | No. 21 | No. 16 Marquette | W 86–83 | 18–4 (8–2) | Edmund P. Joyce Center (11,418); Notre Dame, IN |
| February 13, 2008; 7:00 p.m. | No. 18 | at No. 17 Connecticut | L 84–78 | 18–5 (8–3) | Harry A. Gampel Pavilion (10,167); Storrs, CT |
| February 17, 2008; 12:00 p.m. | No. 18 | at Rutgers | W 71–68 | 19–5 (9–3) | Louis Brown Athletic Center (7,431); Piscataway, NJ |
| February 21, 2008; 7:00 p.m., ESPN | No. 21 | Pittsburgh | W 82–70 | 20–5 (10–3) | Edmund P. Joyce Center (11,418); Notre Dame, IN |
| February 24, 2008; 2:00 p.m., CBS | No. 21 | Syracuse | W 94–87 | 21–5 (11–3) | Edmund P. Joyce Center (11,418); Notre Dame, IN |
| February 28, 2008; 7:00 p.m., ESPN | No. 17 | at No. 18 Louisville | L 90–85 | 21–6 (11–4) | Freedom Hall (19,881); Louisville, KY |
| March 2, 2008; 1:00 p.m. | No. 17 | at DePaul | W 98–91 | 22–6 (12–4) | Allstate Arena (16,934); Rosemont, IL |
| March 5, 2008; 7:30 p.m. | No. 19 | St. John's | W 68–55 | 23–6 (13–4) | Edmund P. Joyce Center (11,418); Notre Dame, IN |
| March 8, 2008; 7:00 p.m., ESPN+ | No. 19 | at South Florida | W 67–60 | 24–6 (14–4) | USF Sun Dome (7,875); Tampa, FL |
Big East tournament
| March 13, 2008; 9:00 p.m., ESPN | No. 14 | vs. No. 24 Marquette; Second round | L 79–89 | 24–7 | Madison Square Garden (19,562); New York, NY |
NCAA tournament
| March 20, 2008*; 9:40 p.m., CBS | No. 15 | vs. George Mason; First Round | W 68–50 | 25–7 | Pepsi Center (19,282); Denver, CO |
| March 22, 2008*; 6:40 p.m., CBS | No. 15 | vs. No. 21 Washington State; Second Round | L 41–61 | 25–8 | Pepsi Center (19,299); Denver, CO |
*Non-conference game. ^{#}Rankings from Coaches' Poll. (#) Tournament seedings in parentheses.

==== Out of conference games ====
Notre Dame opened the season with a win at home against the Long Island Blackbirds. They next traveled to the U.S. Virgin Islands to face the Monmouth Hawks in the first round of the Paradise Jam tournament. After beating the Hawks, they lost in the semifinals to the Baylor Bears, and lose in the third place game to the Georgia Tech Yellow Jackets to leave the tournament with a 2–2 record. The Irish returned home for three games and won against the Youngstown State Penguins, the Colgate Raiders, and the Eastern Michigan Eagles, to move to 5–2 on the season.

They next traveled to New York to face the Kansas State Wildcats in the Jimmy V. Classic, their first televised game of the season. After a close first half, Notre Dame pulled away to get the win. Returning home again, they beat the Northern Illinois Huskies before taking two weeks off for final exams. After finals, they played three more home games, beating the San Francisco Dons, the Brown Bears, and the North Florida Ospreys, to finish their non-conference schedule with a 10–2 record.

==== Big East games ====
Notre Dame began their conference play with two home games before the students returned from Christmas break. With wins over the West Virginia Mountaineers and the Connecticut Huskies, they began conference play with a 2–0 record. They next traveled to face the 16th-ranked Marquette Golden Eagles for their first true road game of the season, but they lost by 26 points to give Mike Brey his worst loss as Notre Dame coach. The team returned home to beat the Cincinnati Bearcats, before again losing on the road against the sixth-ranked Georgetown Hoyas. They finally got their first road win a week later against the 18th-ranked Villanova Wildcats, to move to 4–2 in the Big East with a 14–4 overall record.

Notre Dame returned home to face the Providence Friars, and, although the Friars were 3–4 in conference play, the game stayed close and the Irish only won after an overtime period. They continued at home and beat DePaul in the first of two games against the Blue Demons, to move into the rankings for the first time in the season. As the 21st-ranked team in the country, the team traveled to Seton Hall to face the Pirates. They got their second road win of the season, and returned home to face 16th-ranked Marquette again. With a win over the Golden Eagles, they moved up to 18th in the rankings. They next traveled to Connecticut to face the 17th-ranked Huskies for the second time. Although the Irish led for much of the game, they lost in the end. Despite winning another road game later in the week against the Rutgers Scarlet Knights, they dropped back to 21st in the rankings with a 19–5 record overall.

The Irish next returned home to face the Pittsburgh Panthers, who had beaten them in five straight games. Although trailing at half-time, Notre Dame came back and scored 52 points in the second half to win the game. The team stayed at home to play the Syracuse Orange and led the whole game to get another conference win, but lost another away game the same week at the 18th-ranked Louisville Cardinals. They next traveled to face DePaul, and with the win, swept the Blue Demons in the season. The Irish returned home for their final home game of the season, and, although they were held to under 69 points for only the fifth time in the season, beat the St. John's Red Storm. For their final regular season game they traveled to South Florida and defeated the Bulls to win their fourteenth Big East game, a school record. With a 14–4 record in the Big East, Notre Dame finished the regular season tied for second place in the conference with Louisville.

== Post season tournaments ==
=== Big East tournament ===
With Marquette's loss to Georgetown on March 1, and Notre Dame's win over DePaul on March 2, the Irish clinched a bye in the first round of the Big East men's basketball tournament. They played their opening game, as the third seed of the tournament, on March 13 at Madison Square Garden. Marquette, the sixth seed in the tournament, defeated Seton Hall in the first round to advance and play the Irish in the second round. Despite leading scorer Luke Harangody only playing for seven minutes in the first half, the Irish held a six-point lead at half-time. However, late in the second half, Marquette took a 10-point lead, the largest of the game, and held on to the lead for the 89–79 win, dropping Notre Dame out of the tournament.

=== NCAA tournament ===
Although teams are not officially invited to the NCAA tournament until Selection Sunday (March 16, 2008), multiple publications predicted before the selection that the Irish would receive an at-large bid. The NCAA announced that the team would receive a five seed in the tournament and face the George Mason Patriots in Denver on March 20, whom they beat. The Irish went on to play Washington State, to whom they lost.

== Statistics ==
As a team, Notre Dame averages over 80 points per game and have a 45.9% field goal percentage. Top scorer Luke Harangody averages over 20 points and 10 rebounds per game, a double-double. At the end of the regular season, he led the Big East in scoring. Additionally, he was second in the conference in rebounding, and led the league in each category during conference play. Two other players average over 10 points per game, Kyle McAlarney and Rob Kurz. McAlarney also leads the conference in three-point field goal percentage. Thirteen players have accumulated statistics in games for the Irish.

| Player | GP | Min | Avg | FGM | FGA | FG pct | 3FGM | 3FGA | 3FG pct | FTM | FTA | FT pct | Pts | Avg | Off reb | Def reb | Total reb | Avg | PF | Asst | TO | Blk | Stl |
|---|---|---|---|---|---|---|---|---|---|---|---|---|---|---|---|---|---|---|---|---|---|---|---|
| Harangody | 31 | 891 | 28.7 | 248 | 482 | 51.5 | 3 | 8 | 37.5 | 145 | 189 | 76.7 | 644 | 20.8 | 103 | 212 | 315 | 10.2 | 80 | 53 | 70 | 28 | 25 |
| McAlarney | 31 | 1103 | 35.6 | 158 | 362 | 43.6 | 103 | 230 | 44.8 | 51 | 62 | 82.3 | 470 | 15.2 | 7 | 56 | 62 | 2.0 | 31 | 110 | 60 | 1 | 26 |
| Kurz | 31 | 888 | 28.6 | 120 | 264 | 45.5 | 37 | 93 | 39.8 | 120 | 141 | 85.1 | 397 | 12.8 | 61 | 170 | 231 | 7.5 | 91 | 61 | 64 | 43 | 20 |
| Jackson | 31 | 1016 | 32.8 | 93 | 238 | 39.1 | 17 | 59 | 28.8 | 49 | 96 | 51.0 | 252 | 8.1 | 54 | 102 | 156 | 5.0 | 74 | 189 | 101 | 8 | 58 |
| Ayers | 31 | 785 | 25.3 | 81 | 174 | 46.6 | 53 | 114 | 46.5 | 30 | 40 | 75.0 | 245 | 7.9 | 22 | 80 | 102 | 3.3 | 40 | 38 | 22 | 15 | 24 |
| Hillesland | 30 | 659 | 22.0 | 69 | 138 | 50.0 | 1 | 2 | 50.0 | 48 | 70 | 68.6 | 187 | 6.2 | 43 | 109 | 152 | 5.1 | 72 | 74 | 50 | 13 | 21 |
| Zeller | 31 | 375 | 12.1 | 54 | 125 | 43.2 | 31 | 80 | 38.8 | 7 | 13 | 53.8 | 146 | 4.7 | 27 | 43 | 70 | 2.3 | 42 | 14 | 7 | 5 | 12 |
| Peoples | 31 | 369 | 11.9 | 34 | 77 | 44.2 | 13 | 36 | 36.1 | 25 | 30 | 83.3 | 106 | 3.4 | 22 | 30 | 52 | 1.7 | 21 | 37 | 21 | 1 | 7 |
| Abromaitis | 10 | 38 | 3.8 | 5 | 19 | 26.3 | 1 | 8 | 12.5 | 7 | 7 | 100.0 | 18 | 1.8 | 4 | 5 | 9 | 0.9 | 5 | 3 | 4 | 1 | 1 |
| Proffitt | 6 | 20 | 3.3 | 3 | 7 | 42.9 | 2 | 5 | 40.0 | 0 | 0 | 0.00 | 8 | 1.3 | 0 | 3 | 3 | 0.5 | 0 | 2 | 0 | 0 | 2 |
| Andree | 5 | 13 | 2.6 | 2 | 2 | 100.0 | 0 | 0 | 0.00 | 2 | 2 | 100.0 | 6 | 1.2 | 1 | 3 | 4 | 0.8 | 2 | 1 | 0 | 1 | 0 |
| Nash | 13 | 57 | 4.4 | 6 | 13 | 46.2 | 0 | 1 | 0.00 | 3 | 11 | 27.3 | 15 | 1.2 | 8 | 12 | 20 | 1.5 | 6 | 5 | 2 | 1 | 2 |
| Kopko | 5 | 11 | 2.2 | 2 | 4 | 50.0 | 1 | 3 | 33.3 | 0 | 1 | 0.00 | 5 | 1.0 | 1 | 1 | 2 | 0.4 | 1 | 0 | 0 | 0 | 0 |
| Total | 31 | — | — | 875 | 1905 | 45.9 | 262 | 639 | 41.0 | 487 | 662 | 73.6 | 2499 | 80.6 | 413 | 878 | 1291 | 41.6 | 465 | 587 | 403 | 117 | 198 |

Glossary
| GP: Games played | Min: Minutes played | Avg: Average |
| FGA: Field goals attempted | FGM: Field goals made | FG pct: Field goal percentage |
| 3FGA: 3 point field goals attempted | 3FGM: 3 point field goals made | 3FG pct: 3 point field goals percentage |
| FTA: Free throws attempted | FTM: Free throws made | FT pct: Free throw percentage |
| Pts: Points | Off reb: Offensive rebounds | Def reb: Defensive rebounds |
| Total reb: Total rebounds | PF: Personal fouls | Asst: Assists |
| TO: Turnovers | Blk: Blocks | Stl: Steals |

== After the season ==
=== Legacy ===
Dating to February 2006, the Irish have won 37 consecutive home games and 18 Big East home games. The 18 wins is the second longest streak in conference history, while the 36 total wins is the second longest current streak in the country behind the BYU Cougars. With the win over St. John's on March 5, the Irish became the first Big East team to go undefeated at home in conference games in consecutive seasons.

=== Award winners ===
After the season ended, Luke Harangody was named the conference Player of the Year. Mike Brey was named conference Coach of the Year for the second year in a row. Harangody was also named to the 1st Team All Big East squad, along with Kyle McAlarney.

=== Transfers ===
Notre Dame had two players transfer in following the season. Both would sit out the 2008–09 season, per NCAA rules for transfer students.

- Scott Martin, a 6-8 swingman, transferred after his freshman season at Purdue. Playing mainly off the bench, he averaged 8.5 points and 3.8 rebounds. He had three years of eligibility remaining.
- Ben Hansbrough, a 6-3 guard, transferred after his sophomore season at Mississippi State, and had two years of eligibility at Notre Dame. The younger brother of North Carolina superstar Tyler Hansbrough, he was coming off a sophomore season in which he averaged 10.5 points, 3.8 rebounds, and 2.6 assists as a regular starter.
