= 2007–08 Marquette Golden Eagles men's basketball team =

American college basketball season

2007–08 Marquette Golden Eagles men's basketball
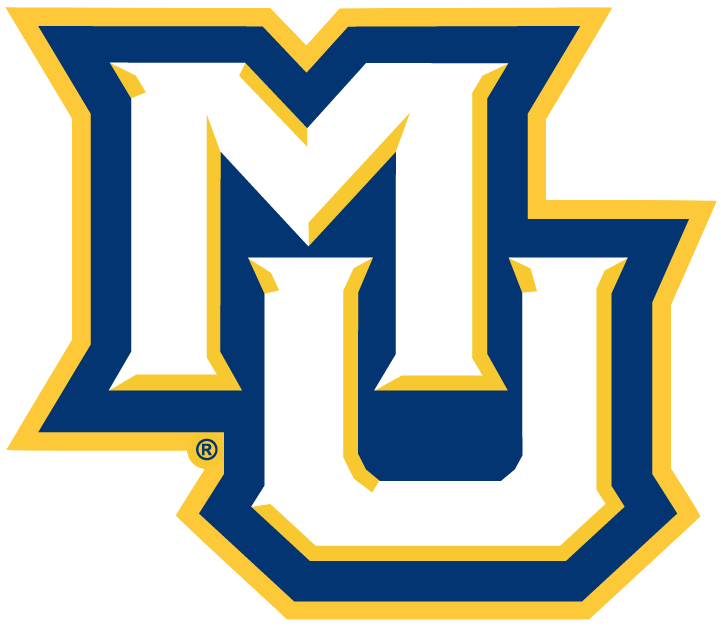

NCAA tournament, second round
- Conference: Big East Conference

Ranking
- Coaches: No. 21
- AP: No. 25
- Record: 25–10 (11–7 Big East)
- Head coach: Tom Crean (9th season)
- Assistant coach: Tim Buckley
- Home arena: Bradley Center

2007–08 Big East men's basketball standings
	Conf.				Overall
Team	W		L	PCT	W		L	PCT
No. 8 Georgetown	15	–	3	.833	28	–	6	.824
No. 13 Louisville	14	–	4	.778	27	–	9	.750
No. 15 Notre Dame	14	–	4	.778	25	–	8	.758
No. 16 Connecticut	13	–	5	.722	24	–	9	.727
West Virginia	11	–	7	.611	26	–	11	.703
No. 25 Marquette	11	–	7	.611	25	–	10	.714
No. 17 Pittsburgh†	10	–	8	.556	27	–	10	.730
Villanova	9	–	9	.500	22	–	13	.629
Syracuse	9	–	9	.500	21	–	14	.600
Cincinnati	8	–	10	.444	13	–	19	.406
Seton Hall	7	–	11	.389	17	–	15	.531
Providence	6	–	12	.333	15	–	16	.484
*DePaul	6	–	12	.333	11	–	19	.367
*St. John's	5	–	13	.278	11	–	19	.367
*South Florida	3	–	15	.167	12	–	19	.387
*Rutgers	3	–	15	.167	11	–	20	.355
† 2008 Big East tournament winner As of April 7, 2008; Rankings from AP Poll; *Did not qualify for 2008 Big East tournament.

The 2007–08 Marquette Golden Eagles men's basketball team represented Marquette University in the 2007–08 NCAA Division I men's basketball season. The Golden Eagles, led by ninth-year head coach Tom Crean, played their home games at the Bradley Center as members of the Big East Conference. They beat Kentucky in the opening round of the NCAA tournament, then lost to Stanford.

== Roster ==
2007–08 Marquette Golden Eagles men's basketball team
Players
Coaches

Pos.	#	Name	Height	Weight	Year	Previous school	Hometown
G	0	Scott Christopherson	6 ft 3 in (1.91 m)	200 lb (91 kg)	Fr	Aquinas	La Crosse, Wisconsin
G	1	Dominic James	5 ft 11 in (1.8 m)	185 lb (84 kg)	Jr	Richmond	Richmond, Indiana
G	2	Maurice Acker	5 ft 8 in (1.73 m)	165 lb (75 kg)	So	Hillcrest	Hazel Crest, Illinois
G	4	Patrick Hazel	6 ft 7 in (2.01 m)	215 lb (98 kg)	Fr	Blair Academy	Queens, New York
F	5	Dan Fitzgerald	6 ft 9 in (2.06 m)	220 lb (100 kg)	Sr	Saint Thomas Academy	Saint Paul, Minnesota
G	10	David Cubillan	6 ft 0 in (1.83 m)	175 lb (79 kg)	So	St. Benedict's Prep	Maricaibo, Venezuela
F	12	Dwight Burke	6 ft 8 in (2.03 m)	250 lb (113 kg)	Jr	St. Benedict's Prep	Brooklyn, New York
F	21	Lawrence Blackledge	6 ft 8 in (2.03 m)	185 lb (84 kg)	Sr	Carbondale	Carbondale, Illinois
G	22	Jerel McNeal	6 ft 3 in (1.91 m)	200 lb (91 kg)	Jr	Hillcrest	Chicago, Illinois
G/F	23	Wesley Matthews	6 ft 5 in (1.96 m)	210 lb (95 kg)	Jr	James Madison Memorial	Madison, Wisconsin
F	32	Lazar Hayward	6 ft 6 in (1.98 m)	220 lb (100 kg)	So		Buffalo, New York
F	33	Trevor Mbakwe	6 ft 7 in (2.01 m)	240 lb (109 kg)	Fr	Saint Bernard's	Saint Paul, Minnesota
F	41	Ousmane Barro	6 ft 10 in (2.08 m)	235 lb (107 kg)	Sr	Chicago Julian	Dakar, Senegal
G	42	Tommy Brice	5 ft 11 in (1.8 m)	174 lb (79 kg)	Sr	Lake Park	Bloomingdale, Illinois
G	45	Robert Frozena	6 ft 1 in (1.85 m)	175 lb (79 kg)	Fr	St. Mary Central	Sherwood, Wisconsin

Head coach

- Tom Crean (Central Michigan)

Assistant coach(es)

- Tim Buckley (Bemidji State)

Legend

- (C) Team captain
- (S) Suspended
- (I) Ineligible
- (W) Walk-on
- Injured
- Current redshirt

Roster

== Schedule and results ==
Date time, TV	Rank^{#}	Opponent^{#}	Result	Record	Site (attendance) city, state
Non-conference regular season
Nov 10, 2007*	No. 11	IUPUI	W 76–68	1–0	Bradley Center; Milwaukee, Wisconsin
Nov 12, 2007*	No. 10	Utah Valley	W 66–55	2–0	Bradley Center; Milwaukee, Wisconsin
Nov 19, 2007	No. 11	vs. Chaminade; Maui Invitational Tournament	W 74–63	3–0 (1–0)	Lahaina Civic Center; Lahaina, Hawaii
Nov 20, 2007*	No. 11	vs. Oklahoma State; Maui Invitational Tournament	W 91–61	4–0	Lahaina Civic Center; Lahaina, Hawaii
Nov 21, 2007*	No. 11	vs. No. 13 Duke; Maui Invitational Tournament	L 73–77	4–1	Lahaina Civic Center; Lahaina, Hawaii
Nov 30, 2007*	No. 13	Milwaukee	W 100–65	5–1	Bradley Center; Milwaukee, Wisconsin
Dec 8, 2007*	No. 11	at Wisconsin	W 81–76	6–1	Kohl Center; Madison, Wisconsin
Dec 15, 2007*	No. 10	Sacramento State	W 82–51	7–1	Bradley Center; Milwaukee, Wisconsin
Dec 17, 2007*	No. 10	Purdue Fort Wayne	W 80–56	8–1	Bradley Center; Milwaukee, Wisconsin
Dec 21, 2007*	No. 10	Coppin State	W 89–42	9–1	Bradley Center; Milwaukee, Wisconsin
Dec 29, 2007*	No. 12	Savannah State	W 77–37	10–1	Bradley Center; Milwaukee, Wisconsin
Big East regular season
Jan 3, 2008	No. 10	Providence	W 96–67	11–1 (1–0)	Bradley Center; Milwaukee, Wisconsin
Jan 6, 2008	No. 10	at West Virginia	L 64–79	11–2 (1–1)	WVU Coliseum; Morgantown, West Virginia
Jan 8, 2008	No. 15	Seton Hall	W 61–56	12–2 (2–1)	Bradley Center; Milwaukee, Wisconsin
Jan 12, 2008	No. 15	Notre Dame	W 92–66	13–2 (3–1)	Bradley Center; Milwaukee, Wisconsin
Jan 17, 2008	No. 13	at Louisville	L 51–71	13–3 (3–2)	Freedom Hall; Louisville, Kentucky
Jan 20, 2008	No. 13	at Connecticut	L 73–89	13–4 (3–3)	Harry A. Gampel Pavilion; Storrs, Connecticut
Jan 26, 2008	No. 21	DePaul	W 79–71	14–4 (4–3)	Bradley Center; Milwaukee, Wisconsin
Jan 29, 2008	No. 17	South Florida	W 62–54	15–4 (5–3)	Bradley Center; Milwaukee, Wisconsin
Feb 2, 2008	No. 17	at Cincinnati	W 75–60	16–4 (6–3)	Fifth Third Arena; Cincinnati, Ohio
Feb 4, 2008	No. 16	Louisville	L 57–71	16–5 (6–4)	Bradley Center; Milwaukee, Wisconsin
Feb 9, 2008	No. 16	at No. 22 Notre Dame	L 83–86	16–6 (6–5)	Joyce Center; Notre Dame, Indiana
Feb 12, 2008		at Seton Hall	W 89–64	17–6 (7–5)	Prudential Center; East Rutherford, New Jersey
Feb 15, 2008		No. 22 Pittsburgh	W 72–54	18–6 (8–5)	Bradley Center; Milwaukee, Wisconsin
Feb 20, 2008	No. 25	at St. John's	W 73–64	19–6 (9–5)	Madison Square Garden; New York, New York
Feb 23, 2008	No. 25	Rutgers	W 78–48	20–6 (10–5)	Bradley Center; Milwaukee, Wisconsin
Feb 25, 2008	No. 21	at Villanova	W 85–75	21–6 (11–5)	Wells Fargo Center; Philadelphia, Pennsylvania
Mar 1, 2008	No. 21	No. 11 Georgetown	L 68–70 ^{OT}	21–7 (11–6)	Bradley Center; Milwaukee, Wisconsin
Mar 4, 2008*	No. 21	Florida Gulf Coast	W 67–37	22–7	Bradley Center; Milwaukee, Wisconsin
Mar 8, 2008	No. 21	at Syracuse	L 72–87	22–8 (11–7)	Carrier Dome; Syracuse, New York
Big East tournament
Mar 12, 2008*	No. 25	vs. Seton Hall; First Round	W 67–54	23–8	Madison Square Garden; New York, New York
Mar 13, 2008*	No. 25	vs. No. 14 Notre Dame; Quarterfinals	W 89–79	24–8	Madison Square Garden; New York, New York
Mar 14, 2008*	No. 25	vs. Pittsburgh; Semifinals	L 61–68	24–9	Madison Square Garden; New York, New York
NCAA tournament
Mar 20, 2008*	(6 S) No. 25	vs. (11 S) Kentucky; First Round	W 74–66	25–9	Honda Center; Anaheim, California
Mar 22, 2008*	(6 S) No. 25	vs. (3 S) No. 10 Stanford; Second Round	L 81–82 ^{OT}	25–10	Honda Center; Anaheim, California
*Non-conference game. ^{#}Rankings from AP Poll. (#) Tournament seedings in parentheses. S=South. All times are in Central Time.
