= 2007–08 St. John's Red Storm men's basketball team =

American college basketball season

2007–08 St. John's Red Storm men's basketball
- Conference: Big East Conference
- Record: 11–19 (5–13 Big East)
- Head coach: Norm Roberts (4th year)
- Assistant coaches: Glenn Braica; Chris Casey; Fred Quartlebaum
- Home arena: Carnesecca Arena; Madison Square Garden

2007–08 Big East men's basketball standings
	Conf.				Overall
Team	W		L	PCT	W		L	PCT
No. 8 Georgetown	15	–	3	.833	28	–	6	.824
No. 13 Louisville	14	–	4	.778	27	–	9	.750
No. 15 Notre Dame	14	–	4	.778	25	–	8	.758
No. 16 Connecticut	13	–	5	.722	24	–	9	.727
West Virginia	11	–	7	.611	26	–	11	.703
No. 25 Marquette	11	–	7	.611	25	–	10	.714
No. 17 Pittsburgh†	10	–	8	.556	27	–	10	.730
Villanova	9	–	9	.500	22	–	13	.629
Syracuse	9	–	9	.500	21	–	14	.600
Cincinnati	8	–	10	.444	13	–	19	.406
Seton Hall	7	–	11	.389	17	–	15	.531
Providence	6	–	12	.333	15	–	16	.484
*DePaul	6	–	12	.333	11	–	19	.367
*St. John's	5	–	13	.278	11	–	19	.367
*South Florida	3	–	15	.167	12	–	19	.387
*Rutgers	3	–	15	.167	11	–	20	.355
† 2008 Big East tournament winner As of April 7, 2008; Rankings from AP Poll; *Did not qualify for 2008 Big East tournament.

The 2007–08 St. John's Red Storm men's basketball team represented St. John's University during the 2007–08 NCAA Division I men's basketball season. The team was coached by Norm Roberts in his fourth year at the school. St. John's home games are played at Carnesecca Arena and Madison Square Garden and the team is a member of the Big East Conference.

== Off season ==
=== Departures ===
Name	Number	Pos.	Height	Weight	Year	Hometown	Notes
Qa'rraan Calhoun	1	PF	6'7"	225	Freshman	North Bridgton, Maine	Transferred to Houston
Daryll Hill	3	PG	6'3"	170	Senior	Bayside, New York	Graduated
Avery Patterson	30	SG	6'4"	204	Junior	Kannapolis, North Carolina	Transferred to Tarleton State
Ricky Torres	22	SG	6'4"	200	Sophomore	Bronx, New York	Transferred to UMBC
Lamont Hamilton	34	PF	6'10"	225	Senior	Brooklyn, New York	Graduated
Aaron Spears	40	PF	6'9"	250	Senior	Chicago, Illinois	Graduated
Devin Mayo		G	6'8"	158	Senior	Upper Marlboro, Maryland	Graduated

=== Class of 2007 signees ===
College recruiting information
Name	Hometown	School	Height	Weight	Commit date
Paris Horne; SG	Middleton, DE	Bridgton Academy	6 ft 3 in (1.91 m)	189 lb (86 kg)	Jan 30, 2007
Paris Horne; SG	Recruit ratings: Scout: Rivals: 247Sports: (93)				
Justin Burrell; PF	Bronx, NY	Bridgton Academy	6 ft 8 in (2.03 m)	244 lb (111 kg)	May 9, 2006
Justin Burrell; PF	Recruit ratings: Scout: Rivals: 247Sports: (82)				
Dele Coker; C	Lagos, Nigeria	South Kent School	6 ft 10 in (2.08 m)	257 lb (117 kg)	Oct 9, 2006
Dele Coker; C	Recruit ratings: Scout: Rivals: 247Sports: (81)				
Malik Boothe; PG	Queens, NY	Christ the King High School	5 ft 9 in (1.75 m)	184 lb (83 kg)	Aug 16, 2006
Malik Boothe; PG	Recruit ratings: Scout: Rivals: 247Sports: (81)				
D. J. Kennedy; SF	Pittsburgh, PA	Schenley High School	6 ft 5 in (1.96 m)	185 lb (84 kg)	May 12, 2007
D. J. Kennedy; SF	Recruit ratings: Scout: Rivals: 247Sports: (81)				
Sean Evans; PF	Philadelphia, PA	Northeast High School	6 ft 8 in (2.03 m)	259 lb (117 kg)	May 23, 2007
Sean Evans; PF	Recruit ratings: Scout: Rivals: 247Sports: (76)				
Mike Cavataio; SG	Fresh Meadows, NY	St. Francis Prep School	6 ft 4 in (1.93 m)	190 lb (86 kg)	Jan 22, 2007
Mike Cavataio; SG	Recruit ratings: Rivals: 247Sports: (71)				
Overall recruit ranking:
Note: In many cases, Scout, Rivals, 247Sports, On3, and ESPN may conflict in their listings of height and weight.; In these cases, the average was taken. ESPN grades are on a 100-point scale.; Sources: "2007 Team Ranking". Rivals.

== Roster ==
2007–08 St. John's Red Storm men's basketball team
Players
Coaches

Pos.	#	Name	Height	Weight	Year	Previous school	Hometown
F	2	Anthony Mason Jr.	6 ft 7 in (2.01 m)	213 lb (97 kg)	Jr	Failey	Memphis, TN
G	3	Malik Boothe	5 ft 9 in (1.75 m)	184 lb (83 kg)	Fr	Christ the King	Queens, NY
G	4	Eugene Lawrence	6 ft 1 in (1.85 m)	210 lb (95 kg)	Sr	Abraham Lincoln	Brooklyn, NY
G	5	Larry Wright	6 ft 2 in (1.88 m)	172 lb (78 kg)	So	Saginaw	Saginaw, MI
G/F	10	D.J. Kennedy	6 ft 5 in (1.96 m)	214 lb (97 kg)	Fr	Schenley	Pittsburgh, PA
C	11	Tomas Jasiulionis	6 ft 11 in (2.11 m)	249 lb (113 kg)	Jr	Trinity Episcopal	Utena, Lithuania
F/C	15	Dele Coker	6 ft 10 in (2.08 m)	257 lb (117 kg)	Fr	South Kent	Lagos, Nigeria
F	22	Sean Evans	6 ft 8 in (2.03 m)	259 lb (117 kg)	Fr	Northeast	Philadelphia, PA
G	23	Paris Horne	6 ft 3 in (1.91 m)	189 lb (86 kg)	Fr	Bridgton Academy	Middletown, DE
F	24	Justin Burrell	6 ft 8 in (2.03 m)	244 lb (111 kg)	Fr	Bridgton Academy	Bronx, NY
G	30	Liam Biesty (W)	6 ft 0 in (1.83 m)	185 lb (84 kg)	Sr	Poly Prep	Brooklyn, NY
G/F	32	Mike Cavataio	6 ft 4 in (1.93 m)	190 lb (86 kg)	Fr	St. Francis Prep	Forest Hills, NY
F	33	Otoja Abit (W)	6 ft 6 in (1.98 m)	195 lb (88 kg)	Sr	Archbishop Molloy	Woodside, NY
G	25	Matt Duell (W)	5 ft 9 in (1.75 m)	155 lb (70 kg)	So	Greenport	Orient, NY
F	55	Rob Thomas	6 ft 6 in (1.98 m)	247 lb (112 kg)	RS Fr	South Kent	Harlem, NY

Head coach

- Norm Roberts (Queens College)

Assistant coach(es)

- Glenn Braica
- Chris Casey
- Fred Quartlebaum

Legend

- (C) Team captain
- (S) Suspended
- (I) Ineligible
- (W) Walk-on
- Injured
- Current redshirt

== Schedule and results ==
Date time, TV	Rank^{#}	Opponent^{#}	Result	Record	Site (attendance) city, state
Exhibition
11/07/07*; 7:30pm		Molloy	W 95–66		Carnesecca Arena (N/A); Queens, NY
Regular Season
11/14/07*; 7:30pm, SNY		St. Francis (NY)	W 72–64	1–0	Carnesecca Arena (3,395); Queens, NY
11/20/07*; 7:30pm		Sacred Heart	W 76–49	2–0	Carnesecca Arena (3,403); Queens, NY
11/25/07*; 7:30pm		Fairleigh Dickinson	W 92–67	3–0	Carnesecca Arena (3,190); Queens, NY
11/28/07*; 7:30pm		LIU Brooklyn	W 68–56	4–0	Carnesecca Arena (3,831); Queens, NY
12/02/07*; 4:00pm, FSN		at Miami (FL)	L 47–66	4–1	Convocation Center (3,515); Coral Gables, Florida
12/15/07*; 4:00pm, SNY		Niagara	L 73–77	4–2	Carnesecca Arena (4,015); Queens, NY
12/19/07*; 5:00pm		vs. Ohio; Rainbow Classic Opening Round	L 69–71	4–3	Stan Sheriff Center (N/A); Honolulu, HI
12/21/07*; 11:00am		vs. Hawaii; Rainbow Classic Consolation	W 68–62	5–3	Stan Sheriff Center (N/A); Honolulu, HI
12/22/07*; 6:30pm		vs. Tulane; Rainbow Classic Consolation	L 71–79	5–4	Stan Sheriff Center (N/A); Honolulu, HI
12/28/07*; 8:30pm, MSG		Marist; Aeropostale Holiday Festival Opening Round	W 62–59	6–4	Madison Square Garden (8.914); New York, NY
12/29/07*; 3:30pm, MSG		Virginia Tech; Aeropostale Holiday Festival Championship	L 48–54	6–5	Madison Square Garden (6,818); New York, NY
01/02/08; 7:00pm, SNY		at Syracuse	L 70–76	6–6 (0–1)	Carrier Dome (17,487); Syracuse, NY
01/05/08; 6:00pm, ESPN Classic		Cincinnati	W 70–58	7–6 (1–1)	Carnesecca Arena (5,019); Queens, NY
01/08/08; 7:00pm, SNY		at Connecticut	L 65–81	7–7 (1–2)	Gampel Pavilion (9,786); Storrs, CT
01/12/08; 12:00pm, MSG		DePaul	L 54–60	7–8 (1–3)	Carnesecca Arena (4,451); Queens, NY
01/17/08; 7:00pm, MSG		at West Virginia	L 64–73	7–9 (1–4)	WVU Coliseum (13,047); Morgantown, WV
01/23/08; 7:00pm, MSG		No. 13 Pittsburgh	L 57–80	7–10 (1–5)	Madison Square Garden (17,487); New York, NY
01/26/08; 3:30pm, MSG		at Louisville	L 57–67	7–11 (1–6)	Freedom Hall (19,462); Louisville, KY
01/30/08; 7:00pm, FSNY		No. 6 Georgetown	L 42–74	7–12 (1–7)	Madison Square Garden (9,924); New York, NY
02/02/08; 7:00pm, MSG		at South Florida	W 72–58	8–12 (2–7)	Sun Dome (4,836); Tampa, FL
02/06/08; 7:30pm, ESPN 360		at Rutgers	W 52–45	9–12 (3–7)	Louis Brown Athletic Center (4,159); New Brunswick, NJ
02/09/08; 12:00pm, FSNY		Providence	W 64–62	10–12 (4–7)	Carnesecca Arena (5,868); Queens, NY
02/13/08; 7:00pm, ESPN2		at Cincinnati	L 43–60	10–13 (4–8)	Fifth Third Arena (7,884); Cincinnati, OH
02/16/08; 8:00pm, ESPN Classic		Villanova	L 42–60	10–14 (4–9)	Madison Square Garden (10,823); New York, NY
02/20/08; 7:00pm, ESPN2		No. 25 Marquette	L 64–73	10–15 (4–10)	Madison Square Garden (6,413); New York, NY
02/23/08; 4:00pm, CBS		at No. 5 Duke	L 56–86	10–16	Cameron Indoor Stadium (9,314); Durham, NC
02/27/08; 9:00pm, ESPNU		at No. 11 Georgetown	L 52–64	10–17 (4–11)	Verizon Center (9,018); Washington, D.C.
03/01/08; 4:00pm, MSG		Seton Hall	W 65–62	11–17 (5–11)	Carnesecca Arena (5,537); Queens, NY
03/05/08; 7:30pm, FSNY		at No. 19 Notre Dame	L 55–68	11–18 (5–12)	Joyce Convocation Center (11,418); Notre Dame, IN
03/08/08; 12:00pm, MSG		West Virginia	L 74–83 ^{OT}	11–19 (5–13)	Madison Square Garden (7,363); New York, NY
*Non-conference game. ^{#}Rankings from AP Poll. (#) Tournament seedings in parentheses.
