= 2007–08 Connecticut Huskies men's basketball team =

American college basketball season

2007–08 Connecticut Huskies men's basketball

NCAA tournament, Round of 64
- Conference: Big East Conference

Ranking
- AP: No. 16
- Record: 24–9 (13–5 Big East)
- Head coach: Jim Calhoun (22nd season)
- Assistant coaches: George Blaney; Andre LaFleur; Patrick Sellers
- Home arena: Harry A. Gampel Pavilion

2007–08 Big East men's basketball standings
	Conf.				Overall
Team	W		L	PCT	W		L	PCT
No. 8 Georgetown	15	–	3	.833	28	–	6	.824
No. 13 Louisville	14	–	4	.778	27	–	9	.750
No. 15 Notre Dame	14	–	4	.778	25	–	8	.758
No. 16 Connecticut	13	–	5	.722	24	–	9	.727
West Virginia	11	–	7	.611	26	–	11	.703
No. 25 Marquette	11	–	7	.611	25	–	10	.714
No. 17 Pittsburgh†	10	–	8	.556	27	–	10	.730
Villanova	9	–	9	.500	22	–	13	.629
Syracuse	9	–	9	.500	21	–	14	.600
Cincinnati	8	–	10	.444	13	–	19	.406
Seton Hall	7	–	11	.389	17	–	15	.531
Providence	6	–	12	.333	15	–	16	.484
*DePaul	6	–	12	.333	11	–	19	.367
*St. John's	5	–	13	.278	11	–	19	.367
*South Florida	3	–	15	.167	12	–	19	.387
*Rutgers	3	–	15	.167	11	–	20	.355
† 2008 Big East tournament winner As of April 7, 2008; Rankings from AP Poll; *Did not qualify for 2008 Big East tournament.

The 2007–08 Connecticut Huskies men's basketball team represented the University of Connecticut and the Connecticut Huskies men's basketball program in the 2007–08 college basketball season. Coached by Jim Calhoun, they played their home games at the XL Center in Hartford, Connecticut, and Harry A. Gampel Pavilion in Storrs, Connecticut.

The Huskies finished with an overall record of 24–9, including a Big East Conference record of 13–5. The team finished the regular season in 4th place in the Big East standings. UConn lost in the first round of the 2008 NCAA Tournament to San Diego 70–69 in overtime.

== Recruiting class ==
College recruiting information
Name	Hometown	School	Height	Weight	Commit date
Donnell Beverly; PG	Lawndale, CA	Leuzinger HS	6 ft 3 in (1.91 m)	180 lb (82 kg)	Apr 12, 2007
Donnell Beverly; PG	Recruit ratings: Scout: Rivals: (76)				
Overall recruit ranking: Scout: NR Rivals: NR
Note: In many cases, Scout, Rivals, 247Sports, On3, and ESPN may conflict in their listings of height and weight.; In these cases, the average was taken. ESPN grades are on a 100-point scale.; Sources: "Connecticut Commit List for 2007". Rivals.; "Men's Basketball Recruiting". Scout.; "ESPN - Connecticut Basketball Recruiting 2007". ESPN.; "Scout.com Team Recruiting Rankings". Scout.; "2007 Team Ranking". Rivals.

== Roster ==
Listed are the student athletes who are members of the 2008–2009 team.

#	Name	Position	Year
4	Jeff Adrien	Forward	Jr
24	Craig Austrie	Guard	Jr
55	Kyle Bailey	Guard	Fr
2	Donnell Beverly	Guard	Fr
40	Johnnie Bird	Guard	Jr
11	Jerome Dyson	Guard	So
33	Gavin Edwards	Forward	So
35	Alex Hornat	Forward	So
14	Curtis Kelly	Forward	So
45	John Linder	Forward	Jr
32	Jonathan Mandeldove	Center	So
12	A. J. Price	Guard	Jr
21	Stanley Robinson	Forward	So
34	Hasheem Thabeet	Center	So
30	Jim Veronick	Forward	Jr

== Schedule ==
Date time, TV	Rank^{#}	Opponent^{#}	Result	Record	Site (attendance) city, state
Exhibition
11/1/2007*		Assumption	W 90–75		Harry A. Gampel Pavilion; Storrs, CT
11/4/2007*		Bryant	W 100–65		XL Center; Hartford, CT
Regular season
11/7/2007*; 7:00 pm, ESPNU		Morgan State; 2K Sports College Hoops Classic	W 69–65	1–0	Harry A. Gampel Pavilion (9,711); Storrs, CT
11/8/2007*; 9:00 pm, ESPNU		Buffalo; 2K Sports College Hoops Classic	W 82–57	2–0	Harry A. Gampel Pavilion (9,740); Storrs, CT
11/15/2007*; 7:00 pm, ESPN2		vs. Gardner-Webb; 2K Sports College Hoops Classic Semifinals	W 78–66	3–0	Madison Square Garden (7,308); New York, NY
11/16/2007*; 9:00 pm, ESPN2		vs. No. 3 Memphis; 2K Sports College Hoops Classic Finals	L 70–81	3–1	Madison Square Garden (8,895); New York, NY
11/20/2007*; 7:30 pm, SNY		Gardner-Webb	W 89–72	4–1	XL Center (11,172); Hartford, CT
11/26/2007*; 7:00 pm, SNY		Florida A&M	W 93–54	5–1	XL Center (11,064); Hartford, CT
12/1/2007*; 3:30 pm, ESPN		vs. No. 19 Gonzaga; The Hartford Hall of Fame Showcase	L 82–85	5–2	TD Banknorth Garden (18,007); Boston, MA
12/6/2007*; 7:30 pm, SNY		Northeastern	W 69–60	6–2	Harry A. Gampel Pavilion (9,915); Storrs, CT
12/16/2007*; 2:00 pm, SNY		Quinnipiac	W 82–49	7–2	XL Center (11,497); Hartford, CT
12/22/2007*; 1:00 pm, SNY		Maine	W 105–60	8–2	XL Center (12,244); Hartford, CT
12/28/2007*; 8:00 pm, CSTV		UCF	W 85–82	9–2	UCF Arena (6,224); Orlando, FL
1/3/2008; 7:00 pm, SNY		at Seton Hall	W 98–86	10–2 (1–0)	Prudential Center (6,962); Newark, NJ
1/5/2008; 9:00 pm, ESPN		at Notre Dame	L 67–73	10–3 (1–1)	Edmund P. Joyce Center (10,505); Notre Dame, IN
1/8/2008; 7:00 pm, SNY		St. John's	W 81–65	11–3 (2–1)	Harry A. Gampel Pavilion (9,786); Storrs, CT
1/12/2008; 2:00 pm, ESPN		at No. 7 Georgetown; Rivalry	L 69–72	11–4 (2–2)	Verizon Center (20,035); Washington, DC
1/17/2008; 7:00 pm, SNY		Providence	L 65–77	11–5 (2–3)	XL Center (13,719); Hartford, CT
1/20/2008; 1:00 pm, FSN New York		No. 13 Marquette	W 89–73	12–5 (3–3)	Harry A. Gampel Pavilion (10,167); Storrs, CT
1/23/2008; 7:30 pm, FSN New York		at Cincinnati	W 84–83	13–5 (4–3)	Fifth Third Arena (10,481); Cincinnati, OH
1/26/2008*; 1:00 pm, CBS		at No. 7 Indiana	W 68–63	14–5	Assembly Hall (17,392); Bloomington, IN
1/28/2008; 7:00 pm, ESPN		Louisville	W 69–67	15–5 (5–3)	XL Center (15,120); Hartford, CT
2/2/2008; 1:00 pm, CBS		No. 18 Pittsburgh	W 60–53	16–5 (6–3)	XL Center (16,294); Hartford, CT
2/6/2008; 7:00 pm, ESPN	No. 19	at Syracuse; Rivalry	W 63–61	17–5 (7–3)	Carrier Dome (23,721); Syracuse, NY
2/9/2008*; 4:00 pm, ESPN	No. 19	Georgia Tech	W 80–68	18–5	Harry A. Gampel Pavilion (10,167); Storrs, CT
2/13/2008; 7:00 pm, ESPNU	No. 17	No. 20 Notre Dame	W 84–78	19–5 (8–3)	Harry A. Gampel Pavilion (10,167); Storrs, CT
2/16/2008; 12:00 pm, FSN New York	No. 17	at South Florida	W 74–73 ^{OT}	20–5 (9–3)	USF Sun Dome (6,185); Tampa, FL
2/19/2008; 7:00 pm, ESPNU	No. 13	DePaul	W 65–60	21–5 (10–3)	XL Center (14,858); Hartford, CT
2/23/2008; 12:00 pm, ESPN	No. 13	at Villanova	L 65–67	21–6 (10–4)	The Pavilion (19,223); Villanova, PA
2/26/2008; 7:30 pm, MSG	No. 15	at Rutgers	W 79–61	22–6 (11–4)	Louis Brown Athletic Center (5,833); Piscataway, NJ
3/1/2008; 12:00 pm, MSG	No. 15	West Virginia	W 79–71	23–6 (12–4)	XL Center (16,294); Hartford, CT
3/6/2008; 7:00 pm, ESPN	No. 13	at Providence	L 76–85	23–7 (12–5)	Dunkin' Donuts Center (9,986); Providence, RI
3/9/2008; 6:00 pm, SNY	No. 13	Cincinnati	W 96–51	24–7 (13–5)	Harry A. Gampel Pavilion (10,167); Storrs, CT
Big East tournament
3/13/2008; 2:00 pm, ESPN	No. 15	West Virginia; Quarterfinals	L 72–78	24–8	Madison Square Garden (19,562); New York, NY
2008 NCAA Division I men's basketball tournament
3/21/2008; 3:40 pm, CBS	(4 W) No. 16	vs. (13 W) San Diego; First Round	L 69–70 ^{OT}	24–9	St. Pete Times Forum (15,920); Tampa, FL
*Non-conference game. ^{#}Rankings from AP Poll. (#) Tournament seedings in parentheses.
