= 2007–08 Syracuse Orange men's basketball team =

American college basketball season

2007–08 Syracuse Orange men's basketball

NIT, Quarterfinals
- Conference: Big East Conference
- Record: 21–14 (9–9 Big East)
- Head coach: Jim Boeheim
- Assistant coaches: Bernie Fine; Mike Hopkins; Rob Murphy
- Home arena: Carrier Dome

2007–08 Big East men's basketball standings
	Conf.				Overall
Team	W		L	PCT	W		L	PCT
No. 8 Georgetown	15	–	3	.833	28	–	6	.824
No. 13 Louisville	14	–	4	.778	27	–	9	.750
No. 15 Notre Dame	14	–	4	.778	25	–	8	.758
No. 16 Connecticut	13	–	5	.722	24	–	9	.727
West Virginia	11	–	7	.611	26	–	11	.703
No. 25 Marquette	11	–	7	.611	25	–	10	.714
No. 17 Pittsburgh†	10	–	8	.556	27	–	10	.730
Villanova	9	–	9	.500	22	–	13	.629
Syracuse	9	–	9	.500	21	–	14	.600
Cincinnati	8	–	10	.444	13	–	19	.406
Seton Hall	7	–	11	.389	17	–	15	.531
Providence	6	–	12	.333	15	–	16	.484
*DePaul	6	–	12	.333	11	–	19	.367
*St. John's	5	–	13	.278	11	–	19	.367
*South Florida	3	–	15	.167	12	–	19	.387
*Rutgers	3	–	15	.167	11	–	20	.355
† 2008 Big East tournament winner As of April 7, 2008; Rankings from AP Poll; *Did not qualify for 2008 Big East tournament.

The 2007–08 Syracuse Orange men's basketball team represented Syracuse University. The team's head coach was Jim Boeheim, serving for his 32nd year. They played its home games at the Carrier Dome in Syracuse, New York. The team finished with a 21–14 (9–9) record, while making it to the quarterfinal round of the NIT tournament. Junior Eric Devendorf was the team's elder classman for 2007–08 squad, starting at shooting guard. Sophomores Arinze Onuaku (center), and Paul Harris (guard/forward) and standout freshmen Donté Greene (forward) and Jonny Flynn (guard) rounded out the rest of the starting lineup. Following an injury to Devendorf, guard Scoop Jardine stepped in and Kristof Ongenaet also saw time in the starting lineup.

== Roster ==
Name	Number	Position	Height	Weight	Year	Hometown
Rick Jackson	00	C/F	6–9	235	Freshman	Philadelphia, PA
Andy Rautins	1	G	6–5	193	Junior	Jamesville, NY
Donté Greene	5	F	6–11	226	Freshman	Baltimore, MD
Jonny Flynn	10	G	6–0	186	Freshman	Niagara, NY
Paul Harris	11	G/F	6–5	228	Sophomore	Niagara Falls, NY
Kristof Ongenaet	12	F	6–8	215	Junior	Ghent, Belgium
Arinze Onuaku	21	C	6–9	258	Sophomore	Lanham, MD
Eric Devendorf	23	G	6–4	178	Junior	Bay City, MI
Devin Brennan-McBride	25	C	6–9	254	Sophomore	London, ON
Josh Wright	30	G	6–2	175	Senior	Utica, NY
Scoop Jardine	33	G	6–1	192	Freshman	Philadelphia, PA
Sean Williams	45	C	6–11	228	Freshman	Villa Park, CA

== Developments ==
- Eric Devendorf and Andy Rautins both suffered season-ending knee injuries
- Scoop Jardine was suspended for three games
- Josh Wright and Devin Brennan-McBride both quit the team
- Donté Greene declared for the NBA draft following the conclusion of the season
- Jonny Flynn was named co-Big East Rookie of the Year
- This marked the first season since 1982 that Syracuse missed back-to-back NCAA Tournaments
