= 2007–08 Pittsburgh Panthers men's basketball team =

American college basketball season

2007–08 Pittsburgh Panthers men's basketball

Big East tournament champions

NCAA tournament, second round
- Conference: Big East Conference (1979–2013)

Ranking
- Coaches: No. 18
- AP: No. 17
- Record: 27–10 (10–8 Big East)
- Head coach: Jamie Dixon (5th season)
- Assistant coaches: Tom Herrion (1st season); Pat Sandle (7th season); Orlando Antigua (2nd season)
- Home arena: Petersen Events Center (Capacity: 12,508)

2007–08 Big East men's basketball standings
	Conf.				Overall
Team	W		L	PCT	W		L	PCT
No. 8 Georgetown	15	–	3	.833	28	–	6	.824
No. 13 Louisville	14	–	4	.778	27	–	9	.750
No. 15 Notre Dame	14	–	4	.778	25	–	8	.758
No. 16 Connecticut	13	–	5	.722	24	–	9	.727
West Virginia	11	–	7	.611	26	–	11	.703
No. 25 Marquette	11	–	7	.611	25	–	10	.714
No. 17 Pittsburgh†	10	–	8	.556	27	–	10	.730
Villanova	9	–	9	.500	22	–	13	.629
Syracuse	9	–	9	.500	21	–	14	.600
Cincinnati	8	–	10	.444	13	–	19	.406
Seton Hall	7	–	11	.389	17	–	15	.531
Providence	6	–	12	.333	15	–	16	.484
*DePaul	6	–	12	.333	11	–	19	.367
*St. John's	5	–	13	.278	11	–	19	.367
*South Florida	3	–	15	.167	12	–	19	.387
*Rutgers	3	–	15	.167	11	–	20	.355
† 2008 Big East tournament winner As of April 7, 2008; Rankings from AP Poll; *Did not qualify for 2008 Big East tournament.

The 2007–08 Pittsburgh Panthers men's basketball team represented the University of Pittsburgh in the 2007–08 NCAA Division I men's basketball season. Led by head coach Jamie Dixon, the Panthers finished with a record of 27–10 and made it to the second round of the 2008 NCAA Division I men's basketball tournament where they lost to Michigan State.
