= 2007–08 Providence Friars men's basketball team =

American college basketball season

2007–08 Providence Friars men's basketball
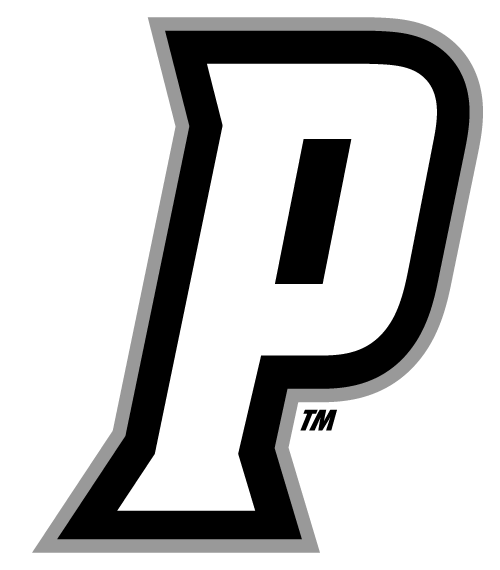
- Conference: Big East Conference (1979–2013)
- Record: 15–16 (6–12 Big East)
- Head coach: Tim Welsh
- Assistant coach: Vince Cautero
- Home arena: Dunkin' Donuts Center

2007–08 Big East men's basketball standings
| | Conf. | | | | Overall |
| Team | W | | L | PCT | W | | L | PCT |
|---|---|---|---|---|---|---|---|---|
| No. 8 Georgetown | 15 | – | 3 | .833 | 28 | – | 6 | .824 |
| No. 13 Louisville | 14 | – | 4 | .778 | 27 | – | 9 | .750 |
| No. 15 Notre Dame | 14 | – | 4 | .778 | 25 | – | 8 | .758 |
| No. 16 Connecticut | 13 | – | 5 | .722 | 24 | – | 9 | .727 |
| West Virginia | 11 | – | 7 | .611 | 26 | – | 11 | .703 |
| No. 25 Marquette | 11 | – | 7 | .611 | 25 | – | 10 | .714 |
| No. 17 Pittsburgh† | 10 | – | 8 | .556 | 27 | – | 10 | .730 |
| Villanova | 9 | – | 9 | .500 | 22 | – | 13 | .629 |
| Syracuse | 9 | – | 9 | .500 | 21 | – | 14 | .600 |
| Cincinnati | 8 | – | 10 | .444 | 13 | – | 19 | .406 |
| Seton Hall | 7 | – | 11 | .389 | 17 | – | 15 | .531 |
| Providence | 6 | – | 12 | .333 | 15 | – | 16 | .484 |
| *DePaul | 6 | – | 12 | .333 | 11 | – | 19 | .367 |
| *St. John's | 5 | – | 13 | .278 | 11 | – | 19 | .367 |
| *South Florida | 3 | – | 15 | .167 | 12 | – | 19 | .387 |
| *Rutgers | 3 | – | 15 | .167 | 11 | – | 20 | .355 |
† 2008 Big East tournament winner As of April 7, 2008; Rankings from AP Poll; *Did not qualify for 2008 Big East tournament.

The 2007–08 Providence Friars men's basketball team represented Providence College in the 2007–08 NCAA Division I men's basketball season. The Friars, led by tenth-year head coach Tim Welsh, played their home games at the Dunkin' Donuts Center as members of the Big East Conference. They finished the season 15–16 with a 6–12 record in the Big East, before losing in the first round of the Big East tournament to West Virginia.

== Previous season ==
The Friars finished the 2006–07 season with an 18–13 record with an 8–8 record in Big East play. They were the 10th seed in the 2007 Big East tournament and lost to the West Virginia Mountaineers in the first round. The team earned an at-large bid to the 2007 NIT as a 5-seed and lost in the first round.

== Roster ==
2007–08 Providence Friars men's basketball team
Players
Coaches

| Pos. | # | Name | Height | Weight | Year | Previous school | Hometown |
|---|---|---|---|---|---|---|---|
| F | 0 | Alex Kellogg | 6 ft 7 in (2.01 m) | 225 lb (102 kg) | Fr | DeSales High School | Columbus, Ohio |
| G | 1 | Jeff Xavier | 6 ft 1 in (1.85 m) | 185 lb (84 kg) | Jr | St. Raphael Academy | Pawtucket, Rhode Island |
| G | 2 | MarShon Brooks | 6 ft 5 in (1.96 m) | 200 lb (91 kg) | Fr | Tucker High School | Stone Mountain, Georgia |
| G | 4 | Sharaud Curry | 5 ft 10 in (1.78 m) | 170 lb (77 kg) | RS Jr | Joseph Wheeler High School | Gainesville, Georgia |
| G | 5 | Dwain Williams | — | 170 lb (77 kg) | So | Vista Murrieta High School | San Diego, California |
| G/F | 11 | Geoff McDermott | 6 ft 8 in (2.03 m) | 235 lb (107 kg) | Jr | New Rochelle High School | New Rochelle, New York |
| G | 12 | Luke Burchett (W) | — | 185 lb (84 kg) | So | Fenwick High School | Western Springs, Illinois |
| G | 13 | Weyinmi Efejuku | 6 ft 5 in (1.96 m) | 210 lb (95 kg) | Jr | Brewster Academy | Fresh Meadows, New York |
| F | 15 | Jamine Peterson | 6 ft 6 in (1.98 m) | 225 lb (102 kg) | Fr | Notre Dame Prep | Brooklyn, New York |
| F | 21 | Chris Baudinet (W) | 6 ft 5 in (1.96 m) | 210 lb (95 kg) | Jr | Taft School | Watertown, Connecticut |
| G | 23 | Brian McKenzie | 6 ft 4 in (1.93 m) | 205 lb (93 kg) | So | Xaverian High School | Brooklyn, New York |
| F/C | 32 | Randall Hanke | 6 ft 11 in (2.11 m) | 240 lb (109 kg) | RS Jr | Trinity-Pawling School | New York, New York |
| F | 33 | Charles Burch | 6 ft 7 in (2.01 m) | — | Sr | Tabor Academy | Dorchester, Massachusetts |
| F/C | 34 | Jonathan Kale | 6 ft 8 in (2.03 m) | 245 lb (111 kg) | Jr | St. Andrew's School | Mattapan, Massachusetts |
| C | 55 | Ray Hall | 6 ft 11 in (2.11 m) | 265 lb (120 kg) | So | J. K. Mullen High School | Denver, Colorado |

Head coach

- Tim Welsh (SUNY Potsdam)

Assistant coach(es)

Vince Cautero

Legend

- (C) Team captain
- (S) Suspended
- (I) Ineligible
- (W) Walk-on
- Injured
- Current redshirt

Roster

== Schedule and results ==
| Date time, TV | Rank^{#} | Opponent^{#} | Result | Record | High points | High rebounds | High assists | Site (attendance) city, state |
Exhibition
| November 2, 2007*; 7:34 pm | | Carleton | W 86–72 | | 15 – McDermott | 9 – Tied | 6 – Efejuku | Ryan Center; Kingston, RI |
Non-conference regular season
| November 15, 2007*; 2:30 pm, ESPNU | | Temple; O'Reilly ESPNU Puerto Rico Tip-Off | W 66–64 | 1–0 | 17 – Williams | 7 – McDermott | 3 – McDermott | Coliseo de Puerto Rico; San Juan, PR |
| November 16, 2007*; 5:30 pm, ESPNU | | No. 18 Arkansas; O'Reilly ESPNU Puerto Rico Tip-Off | W 67–51 | 2–0 | 18 – McKenzie | 8 – McDermott | 3 – Tied | Coliseo de Puerto Rico; San Juan, PR |
| November 18, 2007*; 7:30 pm, ESPNU | | Miami (FL); O'Reilly ESPNU Puerto Rico Tip-Off | L 58–64 | 2–1 | 21 – Efejuku | 11 – McDermott | 2 – Tied | Coliseo de Puerto Rico (5,078); San Juan, PR |
| November 24, 2007*; 7:30 pm | | Harvard | W 93–70 | 3–1 | 27 – Xavier | 7 – McKenzie | 4 – Tied | Dunkin' Donuts Center (7,742); Providence, RI |
| November 27, 2007*; 7:30 pm | | Maine | W 78–48 | 4–1 | 17 – McDermott | 13 – McDermott | 5 – McDermott | Dunkin' Donuts Center (5,263); Providence, RI |
| December 1, 2007*; 6:00 pm | | Boston College; The Hartford Hall of Fame Showcase | W 98–89 OT | 5–1 | 21 – Efejuku | 7 – Peterson | 10 – McDermott | TD Garden (18,007); Boston, MA |
| December 4, 2007*; 7:00 pm | | at Rhode Island | L 60–77 | 5–2 | 12 – McKenzie | 9 – Kale | 4 – Efejuku | Ryan Center (7,657); Kingston, RI |
| December 6, 2007*; 7:00 pm | | South Carolina; Big East/SEC Invitational | L 67–68 | 5–3 | 16 – McDermott | 10 – McDermott | 5 – McDermott | Wells Fargo Center (20,155); Philadelphia, PA |
| December 9, 2007*; 7:30 pm | | Brown | W 70–51 | 6–3 | 13 – Tied | 11 – McDermott | 5 – Efejuku | Dunkin Donuts Center (4,453); Providence, RI |
| December 19, 2007*; 7:30 pm | | Sacred Heart | W 94–89 | 7–3 | 22 – Efejuku | 10 – Tied | 6 – McDermott | Dunkin Donuts Center (4,933); Providence, RI |
| December 22, 2007*; 4:00 pm | | Florida State | W 101–95 | 8–3 | 27 – Xavier | 7 – McDermott | 10 – McDermott | Dunkin Donuts Center (9,069); Providence, RI |
| December 31, 2007*; 2:00 pm | | Saint Peter's | W 83–78 | 9–3 | 23 – Hanke | 14 – Hanke | 7 – Xavier | Dunkin Donuts Center (5,973); Providence, RI |
| January 3, 2008; 9:00 pm | | at No. 10 Marquette | L 67–96 | 9–4 (0–1) | 21 – McKenzie | 6 – McKenzie | 5 – McDermott | BMO Harris Bradley Center (17,041); Milwaukee, WI |
| January 5, 2008; 8:00 pm | | at DePaul | L 65–70 | 9–5 (0–2) | 20 – Efejuku | 15 – McDermott | 3 – Tied | Allstate Arena (9,477); Rosemont, IL |
| January 9, 2008; 7:30 pm | | Rutgers | W 76–50 | 10–5 (1–2) | 24 – McKenzie | 8 – Tied | 8 – McDermott | Dunkin Donuts Center (7,102); Providence, RI |
| January 12, 2008; 4:00 pm | | South Florida | W 76–50 | 11–5 (2–2) | 24 – McDermott | 7 – McDermott | 6 – Tied | Dunkin Donuts Center (8,721); Providence, RI |
| January 17, 2008; 7:00 pm | | at Connecticut | W 77–65 | 12–5 (3–2) | 23 – Williams | 11 – McDermott | 6 – McDermott | XL Center (13,719); Hartford, CT |
| January 24, 2008; 7:00 pm | | Seton Hall | L 75–88 | 12–6 (3–3) | 23 – Efejuku | 11 – McDermott | 5 – McDermott | Dunkin Donuts Center (9,147); Providence, RI |
| January 27, 2008; 2:00 pm | | at Syracuse | L 64–71 | 12–7 (3–4) | 21 – Williams | 14 – McDermott | 6 – McDermott | Carrier Dome (23,309); Syracuse, NY |
| January 31, 2008; 7:00 pm | | at Notre Dame | L 74–81 OT | 12–8 (3–5) | 20 – Williams | 8 – McDermott | 8 – McDermott | Purcell Pavilion (10,179); South Bend, IN |
| February 2, 2008; 7:00 pm | | West Virginia | L 65–77 | 12–9 (3–6) | 18 – Hanke | 4 – Tied | 7 – Xavier | Dunkin Donuts Center (12,993); Providence, RI |
| February 2, 2008; 7:00 pm | | DePaul | L 65–79 | 13–9 (4–6) | 21 – Hanke | 10 – McDermott | 6 – Xavier | Dunkin Donuts Center (6,302); Providence, RI |
| February 9, 2008; 12:00 pm | | at St. John's | L 62–64 | 13–10 (4–7) | 19 – Xavier | 9 – McDermott | 8 – McDermott | Carnesecca Arena (5,868); Queens, NY |
| February 12, 2008; 7:30 pm | | at No. 22 Pittsburgh | L 63–82 | 13–11 (4–8) | 15 – Brooks | 5 – Hanke | 5 – Williams | Petersen Events Center (10,217); Pittsburgh, PA |
| February 16, 2008; 2:00 pm | | No. 23 Louisville | L 72–80 | 13–12 (4–9) | 18 – McDermott | 9 – Xavier | 4 – McDermott | Dunkin Donuts Center (12,500); Providence, RI |
| February 18, 2008; 4:00 pm | | No. 12 Georgetown | L 58–68 | 13–13 (4–10) | 25 – Efejuku | 6 – McDermott | 5 – Xavier | Dunkin Donuts Center (11,689); Providence, RI |
| February 23, 2008; 7:00 pm | | at West Virginia | L 53–80 | 13–14 (4–11) | 15 – Xavier | 9 – McDermott | 3 – McKenzie | WVU Coliseum (11,319); Morgantown, WV |
| March 2, 2008; 12:00 pm | | at Cincinnati | W 81–79 OT | 14–14 (5–11) | 18 – McKenzie | 14 – McDermott | 9 – McDermott | Fifth Third Arena (8,773); Cincinnati, OH |
| March 6, 2008; 7:00 pm | | No. 13 Connecticut | W 85–76 | 15–14 (6–11) | 25 – Efejuku | 9 – McDermott | 5 – Tied | Dunkin Donuts Center (9,986); Providence, RI |
| March 8, 2008; 7:00 pm | | Villanova | L 63–73 | 15–15 (6–12) | 18 – Hanke | 7 – Tied | 7 – McDermott | Dunkin Donuts Center (12,034); Providence, RI |
Big East tournament
| March 12, 2008; 2:00 pm | | West Virginia | L 53–58 | 15–16 | 12 – Efejuku | 6 – Tied | 8 – McDermott | Madison Square Garden (19,562); New York, NY |
*Non-conference game. ^{#}Rankings from AP Poll. (#) Tournament seedings in parentheses. All times are in Eastern Time.
