= 2007–08 Louisville Cardinals men's basketball team =

American college basketball season

2007–08 Louisville Cardinals men's basketball

NCAA tournament, Elite Eight
- Conference: Big East Conference (1979–2013)

Ranking
- Coaches: No. 6
- AP: No. 13
- Record: 27–9 (14–4 Big East)
- Head coach: Rick Pitino (7th season)
- Assistant coaches: Steve Masiello (3rd season); Walter McCarty (1st season); Richard Pitino (1st season)
- Home arena: Freedom Hall

2007–08 Big East men's basketball standings
	Conf.				Overall
Team	W		L	PCT	W		L	PCT
No. 8 Georgetown	15	–	3	.833	28	–	6	.824
No. 13 Louisville	14	–	4	.778	27	–	9	.750
No. 15 Notre Dame	14	–	4	.778	25	–	8	.758
No. 16 Connecticut	13	–	5	.722	24	–	9	.727
West Virginia	11	–	7	.611	26	–	11	.703
No. 25 Marquette	11	–	7	.611	25	–	10	.714
No. 17 Pittsburgh†	10	–	8	.556	27	–	10	.730
Villanova	9	–	9	.500	22	–	13	.629
Syracuse	9	–	9	.500	21	–	14	.600
Cincinnati	8	–	10	.444	13	–	19	.406
Seton Hall	7	–	11	.389	17	–	15	.531
Providence	6	–	12	.333	15	–	16	.484
*DePaul	6	–	12	.333	11	–	19	.367
*St. John's	5	–	13	.278	11	–	19	.367
*South Florida	3	–	15	.167	12	–	19	.387
*Rutgers	3	–	15	.167	11	–	20	.355
† 2008 Big East tournament winner As of April 7, 2008; Rankings from AP Poll; *Did not qualify for 2008 Big East tournament.

The 2007–08 Louisville Cardinals men's basketball team represented the University of Louisville in the 2007–08 NCAA Division I men's basketball season. The Cardinals, led by 7th year head coach Rick Pitino, played their home games at Freedom Hall and were a member of the Big East Conference. The team finished their season with an overall record of 27–9 (14–5 in the Big East) (.750 overall, .737 in the Big East).

The Cardinals entered the season as a co-favorite to win the 2007–08 Big East men's basketball title and was ranked sixth in the preseason Associated Press Poll. The Cardinals lost four graduating seniors from the previous season and graduated three after the season ended.

== Regular season ==
The Cardinals entered the season as a co-favorite to win the 2007–08 Big East men's basketball title. The Associated Press also ranked the Cardinals sixth in their preseason poll.

The Cardinals won the first three games of the season before losing to BYU 78–76 on November 23, 2007. Going into the new year, the team was 9–3 and had played all but one game at Freedom Hall. During the month of January, the team went 6–3 overall and 4–4 against Big East competition. Their first game in Big East competition was on New Years Day, 2008 against Cincinnati, where the team lost 58–57. Between January 28 and March 8, 2008, the team went on a nine-game winning streak and did not lose during the month of February. The team finished the regular season with a loss to Big East rival Georgetown, losing 55–52. The team finished the regular season with an overall record of 24–7 (.774). Against Big East competition, the team compiled a 14–4 (.778) record and finished second in the conference. In three of the four losses to Big East rivals, the Cardinals lost by three or fewer points.

== Postseason ==
The Cardinals made appearances in both the Big East tournament and the NCAA tournament. They finished the season ranked sixth in the Coaches Poll and thirteenth in the AP Poll. At the conclusion of the season, the team graduated three seniors.

=== Big East Tournament ===
The team made an early exit from the Big East tournament with a 76–69 overtime loss to Pitt. Pitt would go on to defeat Georgetown in the championship game and win the tournament.

=== NCAA Tournament ===
For the third time in four years, the Cardinals qualified for the NCAA tournament and were seeded third in the East bracket. They started off the tournament by defeating 14th-seeded Boise State 75–61. They also beat 6th-seeded Oklahoma 78–48 and 2nd-seeded Tennessee 79–60 before getting eliminated by 1st-seeded North Carolina (lost 83–73) in the Elite Eight. The team finished the season with an overall record of 27–9 (14–4 in the Big East).

== Roster ==
2007–08 Louisville Cardinals men's basketball team
Players
Coaches

Pos.	#	Name	Height	Weight	Year	Previous school	Hometown
F	32	Derrick Caracter	6 ft 9 in (2.06 m)	265 lb (120 kg)	So	Notre Dame Prep	Fanwood, New Jersey
F	15	Josh Chichester	6 ft 8 in (2.03 m)	225 lb (102 kg)	So	Lakota West	West Chester, Ohio
G/F	5	Earl Clark	6 ft 9 in (2.06 m)	220 lb (100 kg)	So	Rahway	Plainfield, New Jersey
C	43	Terrance Farley	6 ft 10 in (2.08 m)	245 lb (111 kg)	Sr	Pleasure Ridge	Louisville, Kentucky
G	2	Preston Knowles	6 ft 1 in (1.85 m)	195 lb (88 kg)	Fr	George Rogers Clark	Winchester, Kentucky
G	33	Andre McGee	5 ft 10 in (1.78 m)	180 lb (82 kg)	Jr	Canyon Springs	Moreno Valley, California
G	0	Stuart Miller	5 ft 10 in (1.78 m)	170 lb (77 kg)	So	Middlesboro	Harrogate, Tennessee
F/C	4	David Padgett	6 ft 11 in (2.11 m)	245 lb (111 kg)	Sr	Reno H.S. Kansas	Reno, Nevada
F	3	Juan Palacios	6 ft 8 in (2.03 m)	250 lb (113 kg)	Sr	Our Savior New American	Medellin, Colombia
G	20	Will Scott	6 ft 3 in (1.91 m)	185 lb (84 kg)	Jr	Collegiate School; Cornell	New York, New York
G	34	Jerry Smith	6 ft 2 in (1.88 m)	190 lb (86 kg)	So	Wauwatosa East	Wauwatosa, Wisconsin
G	10	Edgar Sosa	6 ft 2 in (1.88 m)	175 lb (79 kg)	So	Rice	New York, New York
F	25	Lee Steiden	6 ft 4 in (1.93 m)	185 lb (84 kg)	Fr	St. Xavier	Louisville, Kentucky
F	1	Terrence Williams	6 ft 6 in (1.98 m)	215 lb (98 kg)	Jr	Rainier Beach	Seattle, Washington

Head coach

- Rick Pitino (UMass)

Assistant coach(es)

- Steve Masiello (Kentucky)
- Walter McCarty (Kentucky)
- Richard Pitino (Providence)

Legend

- (C) Team captain
- (S) Suspended
- (I) Ineligible
- (W) Walk-on
- Injured
- Current redshirt

== Schedule and results ==
Date time, TV	Rank^{#}	Opponent^{#}	Result	Record	High points	High rebounds	High assists	Site city, state
Non–Conference regular season
November 17, 2007*; 12:00 pm	No. 6	Hartford; Las Vegas Invitational – Campus Round	W 104–69	1–0	18 – McGee	12 – Williams	13 – Williams	Freedom Hall; Louisville, Kentucky
November 18, 2007*; 1:30 pm	No. 6	Jackson State; Las Vegas Invitational – Campus Round	W 84–53	2–0	20 – Clark	14 – Clark	7 – Clark	Freedom Hall; Louisville, Kentucky
November 21, 2007*; 9:00 pm	No. 6	at UNLV	W 68–48	3–0	16 – Clark	10 – Clark	6 – Williams	Thomas & Mack Center; Las Vegas, Nevada
November 23, 2007*; 9:00 pm	No. 6	vs. BYU; Las Vegas Invitational – Semifinals	L 76–78	3–1	24 – Caracter	11 – Caracter	2 – Tied	Orleans Arena; Las Vegas, Nevada
November 24, 2007*; 7:30 pm	No. 6	vs. Old Dominion; Las Vegas Invitational – Third Place Game	W 64–53	4–1	20 – Williams	15 – Clark	4 – Sosa	Orleans Arena; Las Vegas, Nevada
December 1, 2007*; 2:00 pm	No. 12	Miami (OH)	W 47–44	5–1	12 – Tied	11 – Clark	3 – Smith	Freedom Hall; Louisville, Kentucky
December 8, 2007*; 2:00 pm	No. 14	Dayton	L 65–70	5–2	16 – Caracter	12 – Clark	3 – Williams	Freedom Hall; Louisville, Kentucky
December 15, 2007*; 3:30 pm	No. 22	vs. Purdue	L 59–67	5–3	17 – Williams	13 – Clark	3 – Tied	Conseco Fieldhouse; Indianapolis, Indiana
December 18, 2007*; 7:00 pm		Marshall	W 85–75	6–3	23 – Clark	8 – Caracter	6 – Williams	Freedom Hall; Louisville, Kentucky
December 22, 2007*; 2:00 pm		New Mexico State	W 70–65	7–3	15 – McGee	9 – Tied	4 – Tied	Freedom Hall; Louisville, Kentucky
December 26, 2007*; 7:00 pm		Morehead State	W 73–49	8–3	17 – Tied	9 – Caracter	7 – Williams	Freedom Hall; Louisville, Kentucky
December 29, 2007*; 3:00 pm		Iona	W 67–36	9–3	22 – Williams	11 – Caracter	4 – McGee	Freedom Hall; Louisville, Kentucky
Big East regular season
January 1, 2008; 2:30 pm		Cincinnati; Rivalry Game	L 57–58	9–4 (0–1)	17 – Smith	11 – Williams	4 – Tied	Freedom Hall; Louisville, Kentucky
January 5, 2008*; 4:00 pm		at Kentucky; Rivalry Game	W 89–75	10–4	17 – Tied	6 – Tied	4 – Tied	Rupp Arena; Lexington, Kentucky
January 10, 2008; 7:00 pm		West Virginia	W 63–54	11–4 (1–1)	14 – Smith	12 – Clark	6 – Williams	Freedom Hall; Louisville, Kentucky
January 13, 2008; 12:00 pm		at Rutgers	W 64–49	12–4 (2–1)	14 – Smith	14 – Williams	4 – Sosa	Louis Brown Athletic Center; Piscataway, New Jersey
January 17, 2008; 7:00 pm		No. 13 Marquette	W 71–51	13–4 (3–1)	20 – Williams	10 – Padgett	5 – Smith	Freedom Hall; Louisville, Kentucky
January 19, 2008; 8:00 pm		at Seton Hall	L 82–92	13–5 (3–2)	25 – Smith	10 – Williams	10 – Williams	Prudential Center; Newark, New Jersey
January 23, 2008; 7:00 pm		at South Florida	W 80–60	14–5 (4–2)	18 – Clark	9 – Williams	11 – Williams	Sun Dome; Tampa, Florida
January 26, 2008; 3:30 pm		St. John's	W 67–57	15–5 (5–2)	17 – Caracter	8 – Williams	8 – Williams	Freedom Hall; Louisville, Kentucky
January 28, 2008; 7:00 pm		at UConn	L 67–69	15–6 (5–3)	16 – Palacios	7 – Williams	4 – Tied	Gampel Pavilion; Storrs, Connecticut
February 2, 2008; 3:00 pm		Rutgers	W 87–50	16–6 (6–3)	12 – Tied	10 – Tied	4 – Williams	Freedom Hall; Louisville, Kentucky
February 4, 2008; 7:00 pm		at No. 16 Marquette	W 71–57	17–6 (7–3)	18 – Sosa	7 – Clark	6 – Williams	Bradley Center; Milwaukee, Wisconsin
February 9, 2008; 9:00 pm		No. 6 Georgetown	W 59–51	18–6 (8–3)	18 – Padgett	7 – Clark	4 – Padgett	Freedom Hall; Louisville, Kentucky
February 12, 2008; 9:00 pm	No. 23	at DePaul	W 88–68	19–6 (9–3)	22 – Williams	8 – Williams	6 – Smith	Allstate Arena; Rosemont, Illinois
February 16, 2008; 2:00 pm	No. 23	at Providence	W 80–72	20–6 (10–3)	20 – Clark	9 – Clark	4 – Tied	Dunkin' Donuts Center; Providence, Rhode Island
February 18, 2008; 7:00 pm	No. 18	Syracuse	W 61–50	21–6 (11–3)	12 – Tied	10 – Padgett	5 – Padgett	Freedom Hall; Louisville, Kentucky
February 24, 2008; 12:00 pm	No. 18	at Pittsburgh	W 75–73	22–6 (12–3)	21 – Padgett	7 – Williams	5 – Williams	Petersen Events Center; Pittsburgh, Pennsylvania
February 28, 2008; 7:00 pm	No. 13	No. 17 Notre Dame	W 90–85	23–6 (13–3)	26 – Padgett	9 – Clark	4 – Tied	Freedom Hall; Louisville, Kentucky
March 2, 2008; 4:00 pm	No. 12	Villanova	W 68–54	24–6 (14–3)	13 – Palacios	10 – Smith	5 – Williams	Freedom Hall; Louisville, Kentucky
March 8, 2008; 12:00 pm	No. 12	at No. 11 Georgetown	L 52–55	24–7 (14–4)	14 – Williams	10 – Clark	3 – Tied	Verizon Center; Washington, D.C.
Big East Tournament
March 13, 2008*; 7:00 pm, ESPN	(2) No. 13	vs. (7) Pittsburgh; Quarterfinals	L 69–76 ^{OT}	24–8	19 – Clark	9 – Clark	4 – Tied	Madison Square Garden; New York, New York
NCAA Tournament
March 21, 2008*; 9:40 pm, CBS	(3 E) No. 13	vs. (14 E) Boise State; First Round	W 79–61	25–8	15 – Clark	8 – Williams	6 – Williams	BJCC Arena; Birmingham, Alabama
March 23, 2008*; 5:00 pm, CBS	(3 E) No. 13	vs. (6 E) Oklahoma; Second Round	W 74–48	26–8	14 – Clark	8 – Williams	5 – Williams	BJCC Arena; Birmingham, Alabama
March 27, 2008*; 10:00 pm, CBS	(3 E) No. 13	vs. (2 E) No. 5 Tennessee; Sweet Sixteen	W 79–60	27–8	17 – Clark	12 – Clark	3 – Tied	Time Warner Cable Arena; Charlotte, North Carolina
March 29, 2008*; 9:00 pm, CBS	(3 E) No. 13	vs. (1 E) No. 1 North Carolina; Elite Eight	L 73–83	27–9	17 – Smith	9 – Clark	6 – Padgett	Time Warner Cable Arena; Charlotte, North Carolina
*Non-conference game. ^{#}Rankings from AP Poll. (#) Tournament seedings in parentheses. E=East. All times are in Eastern Time.
