= Pioneer Christian Academy =

Location
- Whites Creek, Tennessee; United States; 36.2960°N 86.7737°W

Information
- Type: Private K-12
- Established: 1969
- Closed: 2009
- Principal: Jeff Darnell
- Grades: K-12
- Enrollment: 220
- Mascot: Buffaloes
- Website: http://www.pioneerchristianacademy.org

Pioneer Christian Academy in Tennessee was a college preparatory school in Whites Creek, Tennessee. It was a non-denominational Christian school. In 2006, it had 220 students from pre-kindergarten to twelfth grade. The school closed in 2009.

== History ==
Pioneer Christian Academy was founded in 1969 by Dr. J. Frank Bruce. 32 acres (13 ha) of land was soon donated in the Whites Creek area.

The school was founded as a segregation academy after the desegregation of public schools. In 1972, the IRS revoked the school's tax exempt status because the school failed to document that it had a racially non-discriminatory admissions policy.

In 1980, Rosemark Academy was forced to cancel a football game at Pioneer Christian Academy because Pioneer Christian administrators felt that the Rosemark Academy cheerleader's uniforms were too revealing.

In 2014, the former campus was sold to Jonathan Edwards Classical Academy.

== Athletics ==
The Pioneer Christian Academy Buffaloes athletic teams competed in the Tennessee Athletic Association of Christian Schools. The Middle Tennessee region of the TAACS is the Middle Tennessee Christian Athletic Association, or the MTCAA.

=== State championships ===
- Varsity Volleyball State Champions(9): 1979, 1980, 1986, 1987, 1988, 1989, 1990, 1991, 1992.
- Varsity Football State Champions(5): 1976, 1977, 1978, 1979, 1980.
- Varsity Boys Basketball State Champions(9): 1975, 1976, 1977, 1978, 1980, 1986, 1988, 1990, 2007.
- Varsity Girls Basketball State Champions(3): 1978, 1980, 1981.
- Varsity Baseball State Champions(2): 1977, 1978.

=== MTCAA Varsity Conference Championships ===
- Varsity Volleyball(11): 1979, 1984, 1987, 1988, 1990, 1991, 1993, 1999, 2000, 2001, 2002.
- Varsity Soccer(5): 1985, 1986, 1987, 1988, 1995.
- Varsity Girls Basketball(5): 1982, 1983, 1984, 1986, 1990.
- Varsity Boys Basketball(13): 1980, 1981, 1982, 1984, 1985, 1986, 1987, 1988, 1990, 1996, 1997, 1999, 2007.

=== MTCAA Varsity Tournament Champions ===
- Varsity Volleyball(6): 1983, 1989, 1990, 1991, 1992, 2002.
- Varsity Girls Basketball(6): 1976, 1982, 1985, 1986, 1990, 1993.
- Varsity Boys Basketball(9): 1982, 1984, 1985, 1986, 1987, 1988, 1998, 2000, 2007.

== Notable alumni ==
- Eddie Gossage, Texas Motor Speedway president and track promoter
