= Davidson Wildcats men's basketball statistical leaders =

The Davidson Wildcats men's basketball statistical leaders are individual statistical leaders of the Davidson Wildcats men's basketball program in various categories, including points, rebounds, assists, steals, and blocks. Within those areas, the lists identify single-game, single-season, and career leaders. The Wildcats represent Davidson College in the NCAA's Atlantic 10 Conference.

Davidson began competing in intercollegiate basketball in 1907. However, the school's record book does not generally list records from before the 1950s, as records from before this period are often incomplete and inconsistent. Since scoring was much lower in this era, and teams played much fewer games during a typical season, it is likely that few or no players from this era would appear on these lists anyway.

The NCAA did not officially record assists as a stat until the 1983–84 season, and blocks and steals until the 1985–86 season, but Davidson's record books includes players in these stats before these seasons. These lists are updated through the end of the 2019–20 season.

== Scoring ==
Career
Rk	Player	Points	Seasons
1	Stephen Curry	2635	2006–07 2007–08 2008–09
2	John Gerdy	2483	1975–76 1976–77 1977–78 1978–79
3	Peyton Aldridge	2171	2014–15 2015–16 2016–17 2017–18
4	Jack Gibbs	2036	2013–14 2014–15 2015–16 2016–17
5	Fred Hetzel	2032	1962–63 1963–64 1964–65
6	Derek Rucker	1952	1984–85 1985–86 1986–87 1987–88
7	Brendan Winters	1892	2002–03 2003–04 2004–05 2005–06
8	Jake Cohen	1795	2009–10 2010–11 2011–12 2012–13
9	De'Mon Brooks	1777	2010–11 2011–12 2012–13 2013–14
10	Jón Axel Guðmundsson	1700	2016–17 2017–18 2018–19 2019–20

Season
Rk	Player	Points	Season
1	Stephen Curry	974	2008–09
2	Stephen Curry	931	2007–08
3	Dick Snyder	753	1965–66
4	Mike Maloy	739	1968–69
5	Stephen Curry	730	2006–07
6	Jack Gibbs	728	2015–16
7	John Gerdy	721	1978–79
8	Fred Hetzel	709	1963–64
9	Peyton Aldridge	701	2017–18
10	Fred Hetzel	689	1964–65

Single game
Rk	Player	Points	Season	Opponent
1	Fred Hetzel	53	1964–65	Furman
2	John Gerdy	47	1978–79	Canisius
3	Fred Hetzel	46	1962–63	Jacksonville
	Dick Snyder	46	1965–66	Ohio
5	Peyton Aldridge	45	2017–18	St. Bonaventure
6	Stephen Curry	44	2008–09	NC State
	Stephen Curry	44	2008–09	Oklahoma
8	Stephen Curry	43	2008–09	Appalachian State
	Jack Gibbs	43	2015–16	Massachusetts
10	Stephen Curry	41	2008–09	Chattanooga
	Stephen Curry	41	2007–08	UNC Greensboro
	Fred Hetzel	41	1963–64	VMI
	John Gerdy	41	1977–78	Rutgers
	Jack Gibbs	41	2015–16	Charlotte
	Jack Gibbs	41	2015–16	Morehead State

== Rebounds ==
Career
Rk	Player	Rebounds	Seasons
1	Mike Maloy	1111	1966–67 1967–68 1968–69 1969–70
2	Fred Hetzel	1094	1962–63 1963–64 1964–65
3	Peyton Aldridge	892	2014–15 2015–16 2016–17 2017–18
4	Landry Kosmalski	877	1996–97 1997–98 1998–99 1999–00
5	Hobby Cobb	836	1952–53 1953–54 1954–55 1955–56
6	Rodney Knowles	804	1965–66 1966–67 1967–68
7	Jón Axel Guðmundsson	786	2016–17 2017–18 2018–19 2019–20
8	De'Mon Brooks	765	2010–11 2011–12 2012–13 2013–14
9	Bill Jarman	758	1960–61 1961–62 1962–63
10	Andrew Lovedale	752	2005–06 2006–07 2007–08 2008–09

Season
Rk	Player	Rebounds	Season
1	Mike Maloy	429	1968–69
2	Fred Hetzel	384	1964–65
3	Fred Hetzel	359	1962–63
4	Fred Hetzel	351	1963–64
5	Mike Maloy	343	1969–70
6	Mike Maloy	339	1967–68
7	Rodney Knowles	323	1966–67
	Hobby Cobb	323	1955–56
9	Andrew Lovedale	306	2008–09
10	Doug Cook	287	1968–69

Single game
Rk	Player	Rebounds	Season	Opponent
1	Fred Hetzel	27	1964–65	Furman
2	Mike Maloy	26	1969–70	Virginia Tech
3	Fred Hetzel	25	1962–63	The Citadel
4	Hobby Cobb	24	1955–56	Catawba
5	Mike Maloy	23	1966–67	St. Joseph’s (Pa.)
	Mike Maloy	23	1967–68	St. Joseph’s (Pa.), Feb. 14, 1968
	Mike Maloy	23	1969–70	Holy Cross
	Rodney Knowles	23	1966–67	Fordham
9	Dick Snyder	22	1965–66	Richmond
	Fred Hetzel	22	1964–65	Presbyterian
	Fred Hetzel	22	1964–65	Wake Forest

== Assists ==
Career
Rk	Player	Assists	Seasons
1	Jason Richards	663	2004–05 2005–06 2006–07 2007–08
2	Ali Ton	646	1995–96 1996–97 1997–98 1998–99
3	Jón Axel Guðmundsson	567	2016–17 2017–18 2018–19 2019–20
4	Chris Alpert	542	1992–93 1993–94 1994–95 1995–96
5	Kenny Grant	479	2003–04 2004–05 2005–06
6	Jack Gibbs	466	2013–14 2014–15 2015–16 2016–17
7	Derek Rucker	436	1984–85 1985–86 1986–87 1987–88
8	John Carroll	428	1979–80 1980–81 1981–82 1982–83
9	JP Kuhlman	412	2009–10 2010–11 2011–12 2012–13
10	Stephen Curry	388	2006–07 2007–08 2008–09

Season
Rk	Player	Assists	Season
1	Jason Richards	293	2007–08
2	Jason Richards	249	2006–07
3	Kenny Grant	208	2005–06
4	Chris Dodds	203	1977–78
5	Ali Ton	193	1997–98
6	Ali Ton	190	1998–99
	Ali Ton	190	1996–97
8	Stephen Curry	189	2008–09
9	Malcolm McLean	187	1951–52
10	Kenny Grant	178	2004–05

Single game
Rk	Player	Assists	Season	Opponent
1	Jason Richards	19	2006–07	Mount Saint Mary College
2	Mike Sorrentino	17	1971–72	Appalachian St.
	Chris Dodds	17	1977–78	Wofford
4	Jason Richards	16	2006–07	Colby College

== Steals ==
Career
Rk	Player	Steals	Seasons
1	Derek Rucker	250	1984–85 1985–86 1986–87 1987–88
2	Ali Ton	222	1995–96 1996–97 1997–98 1998–99
3	Stephen Curry	221	2006–07 2007–08 2008–09
4	Chris Alpert	174	1992–93 1993–94 1994–95 1995–96
5	Jack Gibbs	161	2013–14 2014–15 2015–16 2016–17
6	Jón Axel Guðmundsson	160	2016–17 2017–18 2018–19 2019–20
7	Max Paulhus Gosselin	149	2005–06 2006–07 2007–08 2008–09
8	Wayne Bernard	144	1999–00 2000–01 2001–02 2002–03
9	Michael Bree	143	1998–99 1999–00 2000–01 2001–02
10	Anthony Tanner	138	1983–84 1984–85 1985–86 1986–87

Season
Rk	Player	Steals	Season
1	Stephen Curry	86	2008–09
2	Stephen Curry	73	2007–08
3	Ali Ton	71	1998–99
4	Derek Rucker	69	1987–88
5	Derek Rucker	67	1985–86
6	Ali Ton	66	1997–98
7	Derek Rucker	63	1984–85
8	Stephen Curry	62	2006–07
9	Anthony Tanner	60	1986–87
10	Ray Minlend	57	1995–96

Single game
Rk	Player	Steals	Season	Opponent
1	Ali Ton	11	1997–98	Tufts
2	Stephen Curry	9	2008–09	Guilford
	Max Paulhus Gosselin	8	2008–09	Guilford

== Blocks ==
Career
Rk	Player	Blocks	Seasons
1	Jake Cohen	197	2009–10 2010–11 2011–12 2012–13
2	Jamie Hall	159	1978–79 1979–80 1980–81 1981–82
3	Sean Logan	150	2022–23 2023–24 2024–25 2025–26
4	Luka Brajkovic	120	2018–19 2019–20 2020–21 2021–22
5	Peyton Aldridge	116	2014–15 2015–16 2016–17 2017–18
6	Andrew Lovedale	109	2005–06 2006–07 2007–08 2008–09
7	Detlef Musch	107	1989–90 1990–91 1991–92 1992–93
8	Chris Pearson	98	1999–00 2000–01 2001–02
9	Pat Hickert	97	1975–76 1976–77 1977–78 1978–79
10	Boris Meno	89	2004–05 2005–06 2006–07 2007–08

Season
Rk	Player	Blocks	Season
1	Sean Logan	63	2025–26
2	Sean Logan	58	2023–24
3	Jake Cohen	56	2012–13
4	Jake Cohen	55	2011–12
5	Andrew Lovedale	54	2008–09
6	Chris Pearson	51	2000–01
7	Jamie Hall	49	1978–79
	Jake Cohen	49	2010–11
9	Chris Pearson	43	2001–02
10	Pat Hickert	41	1976–77
	Jamie Hall	41	1979–80

Single game
Rk	Player	Blocks	Season	Opponent
1	Tom Dore	8	1975–76	Wofford
	Sean Logan	8	2023–24	Massachusetts
3	Jamie Hall	7	1979–80	Wofford
	Martin Ides	7	2000–01	The Citadel
	Jake Cohen	7	2011–12	Western Carolina
	Sean Logan	7	2025–26	Loyola Chicago
