= 2006–07 Davidson Wildcats men's basketball team =

American college basketball season

2006–07 Davidson Wildcats men's basketball

Southern Conference tournament champions Southern Conference regular season champions

NCAA tournament, first round
- Conference: Southern Conference
- South
- Record: 29–5 (17–1 SoCon)
- Head coach: Bob McKillop (18th season)
- Assistant coaches: Matt Matheny; Jim Fox; Tim Sweeney
- Home arena: John M. Belk Arena

2006–07 Southern Conference men's basketball standings
	Conf.				Overall
Team	W		L	PCT	W		L	PCT
North
Appalachian State	15	–	3	.833	25	–	8	.758
UNC Greensboro	12	–	6	.667	16	–	14	.533
Western Carolina	7	–	11	.389	11	–	20	.355
Chattanooga	6	–	12	.333	15	–	18	.455
Elon	5	–	13	.278	7	–	23	.233
South
Davidson†	17	–	1	.944	29	–	5	.853
College of Charleston	13	–	5	.722	22	–	11	.667
Furman	8	–	10	.444	15	–	16	.484
Georgia Southern	7	–	11	.389	15	–	16	.484
Wofford	5	–	13	.278	10	–	20	.333
The Citadel	4	–	14	.222	7	–	23	.233
† SoCon Tournament winner As of April 30, 2007; Rankings from AP poll

The 2006–07 Davidson Wildcats men's basketball team represented Davidson College in NCAA men's Division I competition during the 2006–07 NCAA Division I men's basketball season. Coached by Bob McKillop and led by freshman guard Stephen Curry, the Wildcats won the Southern Conference regular season and tournament titles, and reached the 2007 NCAA Division I men's basketball tournament. The team finished with an overall record of 29–5 (17–1 SoCon).

== Roster ==
2006–07 Davidson Wildcats men's basketball team
Players
Coaches

Pos.	#	Name	Height	Weight	Year	Hometown
G	2	Jason Richards	6 ft 2 in (1.88 m)	190 lb (86 kg)	Jr	Barrington, IL
F	5	Boris Meno	6 ft 8 in (2.03 m)	220 lb (100 kg)	Jr	Paris, France
G	12	Can Civi	6 ft 1 in (1.85 m)	180 lb (82 kg)	So	Istanbul, Turkey
G	14	Max Paulhus Gosselin	6 ft 6 in (1.98 m)	195 lb (88 kg)	So	Carignan, QC, Canada
F	15	Thomas Sander	6 ft 8 in (2.03 m)	220 lb (100 kg)	Jr	Cincinnati, OH
G	20	Lamar Hull	5 ft 9 in (1.75 m)	165 lb (75 kg)	Sr	Maiden, NC
G/F	22	Will Archambault	6 ft 6 in (1.98 m)	220 lb (100 kg)	Fr	Montreal, QC, Canada
F	23	Steve Rossiter	6 ft 7 in (2.01 m)	230 lb (104 kg)	Fr	Staten Island, NY
G	24	Bryant Barr	6 ft 4 in (1.93 m)	185 lb (84 kg)	Fr	Falmouth, ME
G	25	John Falconi	6 ft 4 in (1.93 m)	205 lb (93 kg)	Sr	Cincinnati, OH
G	30	Stephen Curry	6 ft 2 in (1.88 m)	185 lb (84 kg)	Fr	Charlotte, NC
F	35	Dan Nelms	6 ft 9 in (2.06 m)	215 lb (98 kg)	Fr	Lake Forest, IL
F	41	Andrew Lovedale	6 ft 8 in (2.03 m)	215 lb (98 kg)	So	Benin City, Nigeria

Head coach

- Bob McKillop (Hofstra)

Assistant coach(es)

- Matt Matheny (Davidson)
- Jim Fox (Geneseo State)
- Tim Sweeney (Rochester)

Legend

- (C) Team captain
- (S) Suspended
- (I) Ineligible
- (W) Walk-on
- Injured
- Current redshirt

Roster

== Schedule and results ==
Date time, TV	Rank^{#}	Opponent^{#}	Result	Record	High points	High rebounds	High assists	Site city, state
Regular season
Nov 10, 2006*		vs. Eastern Michigan; John Thompson Foundation Challenge	W 81–77	1–0	19 – Sander	12 – Lovedale	–	Crisler Arena (8,426); Ann Arbor, MI
Nov 11, 2006*		at Michigan; John Thompson Foundation Challenge	L 68–78	1–1	32 – Curry	9 – Curry	–	Crisler Arena (8,762); Ann Arbor, MI
Nov 12, 2006*		vs. Central Connecticut State; John Thompson Foundation Challenge	W 91–64	2–1	26 – Sander	8 – Sander	–	Crisler Arena (8,958); Ann Arbor, MI
Nov 15, 2006*		Illinois-Chicago	W 100–89	3–1	27 – Curry	9 – Curry	–	John M. Belk Arena (2,688); Davidson, NC
Nov 19, 2006*		at Missouri	L 75–81	3–2	17 – Archambault	11 – Meno	–	Mizzou Arena (5,319); Columbia, MO
Nov 21, 2006		Colby	W 99–69	4–2 (1–0)	29 – Curry	18 – Meno	–	John M. Belk Arena (2,237); Davidson, NC
Nov 25, 2006*		at No. 9 Duke	L 47–75	4–3	17 – Richards	10 – Lovedale	–	Cameron Indoor Stadium (9,314); Durham, NC
Dec 1, 2006*		Elon	W 86–61	5–3 (1–0)	30 – Sander	17 – Lovedale	–	John M. Belk Arena (3,109); Davidson, NC
Dec 4, 2006*		at UNC Greensboro	W 66–63	6–3 (2–0)	24 – Curry	6 – Tied	–	Fleming Gymnasium (1,178); Greensboro, NC
Dec 9, 2006*		Charlotte	W 79–51	7–3	17 – Curry	10 – Tied	–	John M. Belk Arena (5,563); Davidson, NC
Dec 15, 2006		Mount Saint Mary	W 116–55	8–3	24 – Sander	10 – Rossiter	19 – Richards	John M. Belk Arena (2,231); Davidson, NC
Dec 18, 2006*		at Chattanooga	W 92–80	9–3 (3–0)	30 – Curry	11 – Curry	–	McKenzie Arena (2,930); Chattanooga, TN
Dec 21, 2006*		vs. Ohio; ASU Sleep America Classic	W 83–74	10–3	19 – Curry	16 – Meno	–	Wells Fargo Arena (4,332); Tempe, AZ
Dec 22, 2006*		at Arizona State; ASU Sleep America Classic	W 75–70	11–3	25 – Richards	5 – Tied	–	Wells Fargo Arena (4,113); Tempe, AZ
Dec 30, 2006*		Western Michigan	W 71–64	12–3	23 – Curry	6 – Tied	–	John M. Belk Arena (3,519); Davidson, NC
Jan 6, 2007*		College of Charleston	W 81–73	13–3 (4–0)	25 – Sander	10 – Sander	–	John M. Belk Arena (4,254); Davidson, NC
Jan 10, 2007*		at Furman	W 71–63	14–3 (5–0)	24 – Sander	9 – Tied	–	Timmons Arena (2,984); Greenville, SC
Jan 13, 2007*		at Wofford	W 83–78	15–3 (6–0)	25 – Meno	14 – Meno	–	Benjamin Johnson Arena (1,438); Spartanburg, SC
Jan 16, 2007*		The Citadel	W 83–78	16–3 (7–0)	17 – Curry	8 – Meno	–	John M. Belk Arena (3,218); Davidson, NC
Jan 20, 2007*		Appalachian State	L 74–81	16–4 (7–1)	15 – Tied	8 – Tied	–	John M. Belk Arena (5,580); Davidson, NC
Jan 23, 2007*		at Georgia Southern	W 81–74	17–4 (8–1)	32 – Richards	8 – Sander	–	Hanner Fieldhouse (2,489); Statesboro, GA
Jan 27, 2007*		Western Carolina	W 79–59	18–4 (9–1)	25 – Curry	14 – Meno	–	John M. Belk Arena (4,438); Davidson, NC
Jan 30, 2007*		at Elon	W 88–58	19–4 (10–1)	25 – Curry	13 – Sander	–	Alumni Gym (1,286); Elon, NC
Feb 3, 2007*		UNC Greensboro	W 75–65	20–4 (11–1)	29 – Curry	9 – Meno	–	John M. Belk Arena (4,588); Davidson, NC
Feb 6, 2007*		Chattanooga	W 87–57	21–4 (12–1)	24 – Curry	5 – Lovedale	–	John M. Belk Arena (3,017); Davidson, NC
Feb 12, 2007*		at College of Charleston	W 73–63	22–4 (13–1)	24 – Curry	10 – Sander	–	John Kresse Arena (3,784); Charleston, SC
Feb 17, 2007*		at Western Carolina	W 92–59	23–4 (14–1)	25 – Curry	11 – Meno	–	Ramsey Center (1,087); Cullowhee, NC
Feb 19, 2007*		Wofford	W 80–73	24–4 (15–1)	28 – Curry	11 – Meno	–	John M. Belk Arena (3,741); Davidson, NC
Feb 22, 2007*		Furman	W 75–57	25–4 (16–1)	24 – Curry	8 – Meno	–	John M. Belk Arena (3,912); Davidson, NC
Feb 24, 2007*		at The Citadel	W 87–70	26–4 (17–1)	21 – Barr	8 – Meno	–	McAlister Field House (1,122); Charleston, SC
SoCon Tournament
Mar 1, 2007*		vs. Chattanooga; SoCon Tournament Quarterfinal	W 78–68	27–4	20 – Tied	10 – Sander	–	North Charleston Coliseum (2,559); North Charleston, SC
Mar 2, 2007*		vs. Furman; SoCon Tournament Semifinal	W 91–68	28–4	30 – Curry	7 – Tied	–	North Charleston Coliseum (9,459); North Charleston, SC
Mar 3, 2007*		vs. College of Charleston; SoCon tournament championship	W 72–65	29–4	29 – Curry	10 – Meno	–	North Charleston Coliseum (8,009); North Charleston, SC
NCAA Tournament
Mar 15, 2007*	(13 MW) No. 23	vs. (4 MW) No. 24 Maryland; First Round	L 70–82	29–5	30 – Curry	13 – Meno	7 – Richards	HSBC Arena (18,646); Buffalo, NY
*Non-conference game. ^{#}Rankings from AP. (#) Tournament seedings in parentheses. MW=Midwest. All times are in Eastern.

== Awards and honors ==
- Stephen Curry – SoCon Freshman of the Year
- Bob McKillop – SoCon Coach of the Year
