= 2008 Southern Conference men's basketball tournament =

- Classification: Division I
- Season: 2007–08
- Teams: 11
- Site: North Charleston Coliseum; North Charleston, South Carolina
- Champions: Davidson (10th title)
- Winning coach: Bob McKillop (5th title)
- MVP: Stephen Curry (Davidson)
- Attendance: 4,181 (Championship game)
- Television: SportSouth, ESPN2

2007–08 Southern Conference men's basketball standings
	Conf.				Overall
Team	W		L	PCT	W		L	PCT
North
Appalachian State	13	–	7	.650	18	–	13	.581
Chattanooga	13	–	7	.650	18	–	13	.581
UNC Greensboro	12	–	8	.600	19	–	12	.613
Elon	9	–	11	.450	14	–	19	.424
Western Carolina	6	–	14	.300	10	–	21	.323
South
No. 23 Davidson†	20	–	0	1.000	29	–	7	.806
Georgia Southern	13	–	7	.650	20	–	12	.625
College of Charleston	9	–	11	.450	16	–	17	.485
Wofford	8	–	12	.400	16	–	16	.500
Furman	6	–	14	.300	7	–	23	.233
The Citadel	1	–	19	.050	6	–	24	.200
† SoCon Tournament winner As of April 30, 2008; Rankings from AP poll

The 2008 Southern Conference men's basketball tournament took place between Friday, March 7 and Monday, March 10 in North Charleston, South Carolina at the North Charleston Coliseum. All rounds were available on ESPN 910. The semifinals were televised by SportSouth, and the Southern Conference Championship Game was televised by ESPN2.

== Bracket ==
First round Friday, March 7
8	Wofford	58
9	Western Carolina	49
7	Elon	52
10	Furman	37
6	College of Charleston	66
11	The Citadel	48

Quarterfinals; Saturday, March 8
8	Wofford	49
1	#25 Davidson	82
4	Appalachian State	46
5	UNC Greensboro	63
7	Elon	60
2	Chattanooga	57
3	Georgia Southern	73
6	College of Charleston	87

Semifinals; Sunday, March 9
1	#25 Davidson	82
5	UNC Greensboro	52
7	Elon	75
6	College of Charleston	61

Championship Game; Monday, March 10
1	#23 Davidson	65
7	Elon	49

== See also ==
- List of Southern Conference men's basketball champions
