= 2007–08 Davidson Wildcats men's basketball team =

American college basketball season

2007–08 Davidson Wildcats men's basketball

Southern Conference tournament champions Southern Conference regular season champions

NCAA tournament, Elite Eight
- Conference: Southern Conference
- South

Ranking
- Coaches: No. 9
- AP: No. 23
- Record: 29–7 (20–0 SoCon)
- Head coach: Bob McKillop (19th season)
- Assistant coaches: Matt Matheny; Jim Fox; Tim Sweeney
- Home arena: John M. Belk Arena

2007–08 Southern Conference men's basketball standings
	Conf.				Overall
Team	W		L	PCT	W		L	PCT
North
Appalachian State	13	–	7	.650	18	–	13	.581
Chattanooga	13	–	7	.650	18	–	13	.581
UNC Greensboro	12	–	8	.600	19	–	12	.613
Elon	9	–	11	.450	14	–	19	.424
Western Carolina	6	–	14	.300	10	–	21	.323
South
No. 23 Davidson†	20	–	0	1.000	29	–	7	.806
Georgia Southern	13	–	7	.650	20	–	12	.625
College of Charleston	9	–	11	.450	16	–	17	.485
Wofford	8	–	12	.400	16	–	16	.500
Furman	6	–	14	.300	7	–	23	.233
The Citadel	1	–	19	.050	6	–	24	.200
† SoCon Tournament winner As of April 30, 2008; Rankings from AP poll

The 2007–08 Davidson Wildcats men's basketball team represented Davidson College in NCAA men's Division I competition during the 2007–08 NCAA Division I men's basketball season.

Coached by 2008 NABC Coach of the Year Bob McKillop and led by consensus Second Team All-American guard Stephen Curry, the Wildcats completed an undefeated season in the Southern Conference and reached the 2008 NCAA Division I men's basketball tournament Elite 8, upsetting Gonzaga, Georgetown, and Wisconsin before falling to eventual national champion Kansas 59–57. This marked the first time that Davidson won a tournament game since the 1969 season, when the Wildcats reached the Elite Eight under then-coach Lefty Driesell.

== Roster ==
2007–08 Davidson Wildcats men's basketball team
Players
Coaches

Pos.	#	Name	Height	Weight	Year	Hometown
G	1	Brendan McKillop	6 ft 1 in (1.85 m)	190 lb (86 kg)	Fr	Davidson, NC
G	2	Jason Richards	6 ft 2 in (1.88 m)	190 lb (86 kg)	Sr	Barrington, IL
G	4	Aaron Bond	6 ft 5 in (1.96 m)	185 lb (84 kg)	Jr	Ashburn, VA
F	5	Boris Meno	6 ft 8 in (2.03 m)	220 lb (100 kg)	Sr	Paris, France
G	12	Can Civi	6 ft 1 in (1.85 m)	180 lb (82 kg)	Jr	Istanbul, Turkey
G	14	Max Paulhus Gosselin	6 ft 6 in (1.98 m)	195 lb (88 kg)	Jr	Carignan, QC, Canada
F	15	Thomas Sander	6 ft 8 in (2.03 m)	220 lb (100 kg)	Sr	Cincinnati, OH
G/F	20	Mike Schmitt	6 ft 4 in (1.93 m)	195 lb (88 kg)	Fr	Rocky Mount, NC
G/F	22	Will Archambault	6 ft 6 in (1.98 m)	220 lb (100 kg)	So	Montreal, QC, Canada
F	23	Steve Rossiter	6 ft 7 in (2.01 m)	230 lb (104 kg)	So	Staten Island, NY
G	24	Bryant Barr	6 ft 4 in (1.93 m)	185 lb (84 kg)	So	Falmouth, ME
G	30	Stephen Curry	6 ft 2 in (1.88 m)	185 lb (84 kg)	So	Charlotte, NC
F	35	Dan Nelms	6 ft 9 in (2.06 m)	215 lb (98 kg)	So	Lake Forest, IL
F	41	Andrew Lovedale	6 ft 8 in (2.03 m)	215 lb (98 kg)	Jr	Benin City, Nigeria
F	42	Ben Allison	6 ft 9 in (2.06 m)	205 lb (93 kg)	Fr	West Sussex, England

Head coach

- Bob McKillop (Hofstra)

Assistant coach(es)

- Matt Matheny (Davidson)
- Jim Fox (Geneseo State)
- Tim Sweeney (Rochester)

Legend

- (C) Team captain
- (S) Suspended
- (I) Ineligible
- (W) Walk-on
- Injured
- Current redshirt

Roster

== Schedule and results ==
Date time, TV	Rank^{#}	Opponent^{#}	Result	Record	High points	High rebounds	High assists	Site city, state
Regular season
Nov 9, 2007; 8:00 p.m.		Emory	W 120–56	1–0	27 – Curry	13 – Meno	–	John M. Belk Arena (3,142); Davidson, NC
Nov 14, 2007*; 7:00 p.m., ESPN		vs. No. 1 North Carolina	L 68–72	1–1	24 – Curry	9 – Meno	–	Charlotte Bobcats Arena (19,299); Charlotte, NC
Nov 21, 2007*		at Western Michigan	L 76–83	1–2	25 – Curry	8 – Meno	–	University Arena (3,542); Kalamazoo, MI
Nov 24, 2007*		North Carolina Central	W 98–50	2–2	16 – Curry	10 – Rossiter	–	John M. Belk Arena (3,412); Davidson, NC
Nov 26, 2007*		at Appalachian State	W 71–60	3–2 (1–0)	38 – Curry	6 – Tied	–	Holmes Convocation Center (3,248); Boone, NC
Dec 1, 2007*; 12:00 p.m., ESPNU		vs. No. 7 Duke	L 73–79	3–3	20 – Curry	10 – Meno	–	Charlotte Bobcats Arena (17,034); Charlotte, NC
Dec 5, 2007*		at Charlotte	L 68–75	3–4	32 – Curry	14 – Sander	–	Dale F. Halton Arena (8,923); Charlotte, NC
Dec 8, 2007*		vs. No. 7 UCLA; John R. Wooden Classic	L 63–75	3–5	15 – Curry	4 – Curry	–	Honda Center (17,440); Anaheim, CA
Dec 13, 2007*		The Citadel	W 95–74	4–5 (2–0)	23 – Barr	8 – Meno	–	John M. Belk Arena (3,492); Davidson, NC
Dec 21, 2007*		at NC State	L 65–66	4–6	29 – Curry	5 – Tied	–	RBC Center (14,024); Raleigh, NC
Jan 3, 2008*; 7:00 p.m.		Georgia Southern	W 92–67	5–6 (3–0)	24 – Curry	10 – Curry	–	John M. Belk Arena (3,314); Davidson, NC
Jan 5, 2008*; 7:00 p.m.		Western Carolina	W 92–67	6–6 (4–0)	19 – Curry	10 – Sander	–	John M. Belk Arena (4,602); Davidson, NC
Jan 9, 2008*		at Elon	W 59–57	7–6 (5–0)	15 – Curry	13 – Sander	–	Alumni Gym (1,662); Elon, NC
Jan 12, 2008*		at Wofford	W 85–50	8–6 (6–0)	26 – Curry	9 – Meno	–	Benjamin Johnson Arena (2,095); Spartanburg, SC
Jan 16, 2008*		at Furman	W 73–51	9–6 (7–0)	14 – Curry	7 – Curry	–	Timmons Arena (2,061); Greenville, SC
Jan 19, 2008*		Chattanooga	W 85–58	10–6 (8–0)	37 – Curry	5 – Tied	–	John M. Belk Arena (5,361); Davidson, NC
Jan 21, 2008*		at Western Carolina	W 82–67	11–6 (9–0)	29 – Curry	8 – Tied	–	Ramsey Center (2,125); Cullowhee, NC
Jan 24, 2008*		at The Citadel	W 87–70	12–6 (10–0)	28 – Curry	9 – Meno	–	McAlister Field House (1,204); Charleston, SC
Jan 26, 2008*		at College of Charleston	W 70–58	13–6 (11–0)	21 – Sander	7 – Lovedale	–	John Kresse Arena (3,681); Charleston, SC
Jan 30, 2008*		Wofford	W 78–65	14–6 (12–0)	34 – Curry	9 – Sander	–	John M. Belk Arena (3,932); Davidson, NC
Feb 2, 2008*		at Chattanooga	W 78–71	15–6 (13–0)	24 – Curry	7 – Tied	–	McKenzie Arena (5,493); Chattanooga, TN
Feb 6, 2008*		Elon	W 74–64	16–6 (14–0)	36 – Curry	13 – Lovedale	–	John M. Belk Arena (3,424); Davidson, NC
Feb 9, 2008*		College of Charleston	W 81–56	17–6 (15–0)	26 – Curry	10 – Meno	–	John M. Belk Arena (5,753); Davidson, NC
Feb 13, 2008*		at UNC Greensboro	W 83–78	18–6 (16–0)	41 – Curry	8 – Lovedale	–	Fleming Gymnasium (1,831); Greensboro, NC
Feb 16, 2008*		Furman	W 86–51	19–6 (17–0)	28 – Archambault	7 – Richards	–	John M. Belk Arena (4,724); Davidson, NC
Feb 19, 2008*		UNC Greensboro	W 75–66	20–6 (18–0)	30 – Curry	5 – Tied	–	John M. Belk Arena (4,466); Davidson, NC
Feb 22, 2008*		at Winthrop; BracketBusters	W 60–47	21–6	24 – Richards	10 – Lovedale	–	Winthrop Coliseum (6,105); Rock Hill, SC
Feb 27, 2008*		Appalachian State	W 68–55	22–6 (19–0)	24 – Richards	7 – Sander	–	John M. Belk Arena (5,838); Davidson, NC
Mar 1, 2008*		at Georgia Southern	W 89–69	23–6 (20–0)	35 – Curry	9 – Meno	–	Hanner Fieldhouse (3,074); Statesboro, GA
SoCon Tournament
Mar 8, 2008*	(1) No. 25	vs. (8) Wofford; Quarterfinals	W 82–49	24–6	19 – Curry	11 – Lovedale	–	North Charleston Coliseum (4,289); North Charleston, SC
Mar 9, 2008*	(1) No. 25	vs. (5) UNC Greensboro; Semifinals	W 82–52	25–6	26 – Curry	7 – Rossiter	–	North Charleston Coliseum (6,612); North Charleston, SC
Mar 10, 2008*	(1) No. 23	vs. (7) Elon; Championship	W 65–49	26–6	23 – Curry	6 – Sander	11 – Richards	North Charleston Coliseum (4,181); North Charleston, SC
NCAA Tournament
Mar 21, 2008*	(10 MW) No. 23	vs. (7 MW) No. 24 Gonzaga; First Round	W 82–76	27–6	40 – Curry	13 – Lovedale	9 – Richards	RBC Center (19,477); Raleigh, NC
Mar 23, 2008*	(10 MW) No. 23	vs. (2 MW) No. 8 Georgetown; Second Round	W 74–70	28–6	30 – Curry	6 – Sander	5 – Tied	RBC Center (19,477); Raleigh, NC
Mar 28, 2008*	(10 MW) No. 23	vs. (3 MW) No. 6 Wisconsin; Sweet Sixteen	W 73–56	29–6	33 – Curry	6 – Gosselin	13 – Richards	Ford Field (57,028); Detroit, MI
Mar 30, 2008*	(10 MW) No. 23	vs. (1 MW) No. 4 Kansas; Elite Eight	L 57–59	29–7	25 – Curry	5 – Tied	9 – Richards	Ford Field (57,563); Detroit, MI
*Non-conference game. ^{#}Rankings from AP. (#) Tournament seedings in parentheses. MW=Midwest. All times are in Eastern.

== Rankings ==
Ranking movements Legend: ██ Increase in ranking ██ Decrease in ranking — = Not ranked
	Week																				
Poll	Pre	1	2	3	4	5	6	7	8	9	10	11	12	13	14	15	16	17	18	19	Final
AP	—	—	—	—	—	—	—	—	—	—	—	—	—	—	—	—	—	25	23	23	Not released
Coaches	—	—	25	—	—	—	—	—	—	—	—	—	—	—	—	—	—	—	25	23	9

== Awards and honors ==
- Stephen Curry – Consensus Second-team All-American, SoCon Player of the Year
- Jason Richards – National assists leader
- Bob McKillop – NABC Coach of the Year, Clair Bee Coach of the Year Award, SoCon Coach of the Year
