= List of Appalachian State Mountaineers men's basketball head coaches =

The following is a list of Appalachian State Mountaineers men's basketball head coaches. The Mountaineers have had 22 coaches in their 106-season history.

Appalachian State's current head coach is Dustin Kerns. He was hired in March 2019 to replace Jim Fox, who was let go by Appalachian State at the end of the 2019 season.

No.	Tenure	Coach	Years	Record	Pct.
–	1919–1920	No coach listed	1	0–1	.000
1	1920–1922 (Note: Records for these seasons are incomplete)	J. T. C. Wright	2	0–0	–
2	1922–1924 (Note: Chapel Wilson coached the 1924–25 team through December; T.R. Blaine took over starting January 1925 and left at the end of the season, to be replaced by Wilson for the 1925–26 season); 1925–1927	Chapel Wilson	4	17–5	.773
3	1925	T. R. Baine	1	0–0	–
4	1927–1928; 1944–1945	Graydon Eggers	2	21–16	.568
5	1928–1929	Vann G. Henson	1	12–8	.600
6	1929–1933	C. B. Johnston	4	46–20	.697
7	1933–1935	Eugene Garbee	2	20–17	.541
8	1935–1940; 1946–1947	Flucie Stewart	6	63–41	.606
9	1940–1942	Clyde Canipe	2	38–7	.844
10	1942–1943	Belus Smawley	1	12–9	.571
11	1943–1944	Harold Quincy	1	0–7	.000
12	1945–1946; 1947–1957	Francis Hoover	11	133–127	.512
13	1957–1972	Bob Light	15	212–179	.542
14	1972–1975	Press Maravich	3	14–63	.182
15	1975–1981	Bobby Cremins	6	100–70	.588
16	1981–1986	Kevin Cantwell	5	61–78	.439
17	1986–1996	Tom Apke	10	139–147	.486
18	1996–2000; 2009–2010	Buzz Peterson	5	103–52	.665
19	2000–2009	Houston Fancher	9	137–136	.502
20	2010–2014	Jason Capel	4	53–70	.431
21	2014–2019	Jim Fox	5	56–99	.361
22	2019–present	Dustin Kerns	7	133–91	.594
Totals		22 coaches	106 seasons	1,370–1,243	.524
Records updated through end of 2025–26 season Source
