= 2007 Southern Conference men's basketball tournament =

- Classification: Division I
- Season: 2006–07
- Teams: 11
- Site: North Charleston Coliseum; North Charleston, South Carolina
- Champions: Davidson (9th title)
- Winning coach: Bob McKillop (4th title)
- MVP: Stephen Curry (Davidson)
- Attendance: 8,009 (Championship game)

The 2007 Southern Conference men's basketball tournament took place between Wednesday, February 28 and Saturday, March 3 at the North Charleston Coliseum in North Charleston, South Carolina. The Davidson Wildcats won the championship to secure their 9th trip to the NCAA Men's Division I Basketball Championship.

== Standings ==
North Division
School	W	L
Appalachian State	15	3
UNC Greensboro	12	6
Western Carolina	7	11
Chattanooga	6	12
Elon	5	13
South Division
School	W	L
Davidson	17	1
College of Charleston	13	5
Furman	8	10
Georgia Southern	7	11
Wofford	5	13
The Citadel	4	14

== Bracket ==
First round Wednesday, February 28
8	Chattanooga	65
9	Wofford	55
7	Western Carolina	69
10	Elon	65
6	Georgia Southern	62
11	The Citadel	46

Quarterfinals; Thursday, March 1
1	Davidson	78
8	Chattanooga	68
4	UNC Greensboro	71
5	Furman	73
2	Appalachian State	78
7	Western Carolina	59
3	College of Charleston	77
6	Georgia Southern	66

Semifinals; Friday, March 2
1	Davidson	91
5	Furman	68
2	Appalachian State	87
3	College of Charleston	89*

Championship Game; Saturday, March 3
1	Davidson	72
3	College of Charleston	65

* Overtime game

== See also ==
- List of Southern Conference men's basketball champions
