= Jack Gibbs (basketball) =

American basketball player (born 1995)

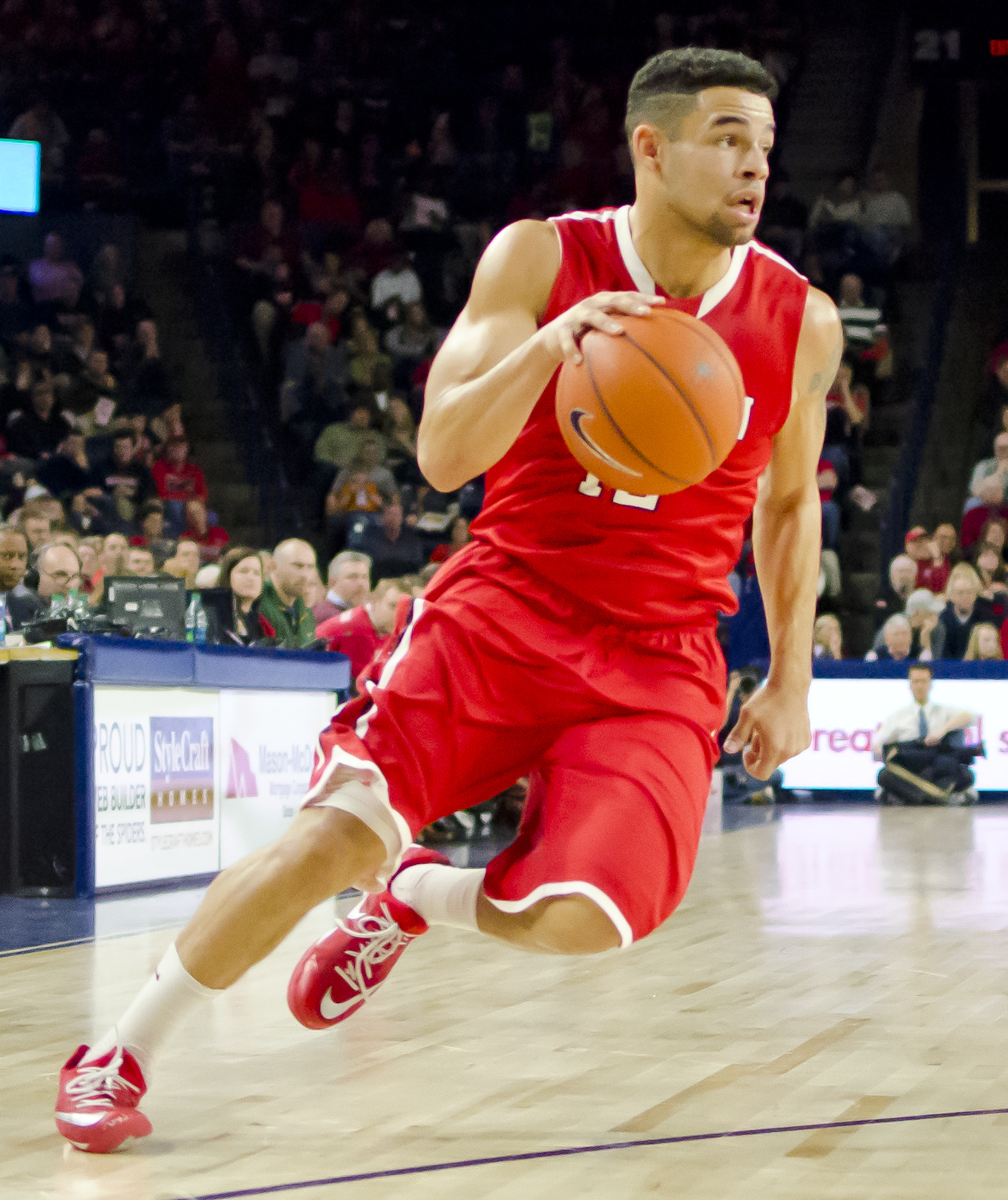
- Gibbs playing for Davidson in 2015

Free agent
- Position: Point guard

Personal information
- Born: January 29, 1995 (age 31)
- Listed height: 6 ft 0 in (1.83 m)
- Listed weight: 195 lb (88 kg)

Career information
- High school: Westerville North (Westerville, Ohio)
- College: Davidson (2013–2017)
- NBA draft: 2017: undrafted
- Playing career: 2017–present

Career history
- 2017–2018: Spirou Charleroi
- 2019: Salon Vilpas
- 2019–2020: Limburg United

Career highlights
- 2× First-team All-Atlantic 10 (2017, 2018); Second-team All-Atlantic 10 (2016)

Jack Gibbs (born January 29, 1995) is an American professional basketball player who last played for Limburg United of the Belgian Pro Basketball League. He played college basketball for Davidson.

== High school career ==
Gibbs attended Westerville North High School in Ohio. He tore his ACL in a game as a junior while being scouted by Matt McKillop, a Davidson assistant coach. He committed to play college basketball at Davidson and also received a scholarship offer from Creighton. He averaged 16.8 points, 4.8 steals and 4.1 assists per game as a senior and led the Warriors to a 21–2 record and a berth in the district semifinals. Gibbs was named Gatorade Boys Player of the Year in Ohio.

== College career ==
Gibbs played infrequently as a freshman but averaged 16.2 points per game as a sophomore despite missing seven games with a torn meniscus in his knee. He had two 30-point games, including a 37-point performance in a 95–69 win over UCF on November 26, 2014. Gibbs was a Second Team All-Atlantic 10 selection as a sophomore.

Coming into his junior year, he became Davidson's top scoring threat due to the graduation of Tyler Kalinoski. In December 2015, he had 41 points in a win over Charlotte and was congratulated by former Davidson player Stephen Curry. According to advanced statistics, Gibbs outperformed Curry in handling the ball in transition and scored more points near the rim. Gibbs was named to the First Team All-Atlantic 10 as a junior. He averaged 23.5 points per game for the Wildcats on a 20–13 team despite battling injury.

As a senior, Gibbs repeated on the First Team All-Atlantic 10. He had 34 points and surpassed the 2,000 point threshold in a 73–67 win over Dayton in the conference tournament semifinals. Gibbs averaged 22.1 points, 4.0 rebounds and 4.1 assists per game. He finished third in scoring all time at Davidson with 2,033 points.

== Professional career ==
After going undrafted in the 2017 NBA draft, Gibbs played with the Minnesota Timberwolves in the NBA Summer League. In August he signed with the Spirou Charleroi of the Belgian Pro Basketball League. In 31 games league games, Gibbs averaged 13.5 points and in 8 games in FIBA Europe Cup, he averaged 11.9 points per game.

In January 2019, Gibbs signed with Salon Vilpas of the Finnish Korisliiga. He averaged 15.5 points, 2.3 rebounds and 3.5 assists per game for Salon Vilpas. On June 7, 2019, he signed with Limburg United in Belgium. Gibbs tore a muscle in January 2020 and was sidelined for several weeks.
