= 2007–08 Georgetown Hoyas men's basketball team =

American college basketball season

2007–08 Georgetown Hoyas men's basketball

Big East Regular Season Champions

NCAA tournament, second round
- Conference: Big East Conference

Ranking
- Coaches: No. 12
- AP: No. 8
- Record: 28–6 (15–3 Big East)
- Head coach: John Thompson III (4th season)
- Assistant coaches: Robert Burke (4th season); David Cox (1st season); Kenya Hunter (1st season)
- Captains: Tyler Crawford; Roy Hibbert; Jonathan Wallace
- Home arena: Verizon Center

2007–08 Big East men's basketball standings
	Conf.				Overall
Team	W		L	PCT	W		L	PCT
No. 8 Georgetown	15	–	3	.833	28	–	6	.824
No. 13 Louisville	14	–	4	.778	27	–	9	.750
No. 15 Notre Dame	14	–	4	.778	25	–	8	.758
No. 16 Connecticut	13	–	5	.722	24	–	9	.727
West Virginia	11	–	7	.611	26	–	11	.703
No. 25 Marquette	11	–	7	.611	25	–	10	.714
No. 17 Pittsburgh†	10	–	8	.556	27	–	10	.730
Villanova	9	–	9	.500	22	–	13	.629
Syracuse	9	–	9	.500	21	–	14	.600
Cincinnati	8	–	10	.444	13	–	19	.406
Seton Hall	7	–	11	.389	17	–	15	.531
Providence	6	–	12	.333	15	–	16	.484
*DePaul	6	–	12	.333	11	–	19	.367
*St. John's	5	–	13	.278	11	–	19	.367
*South Florida	3	–	15	.167	12	–	19	.387
*Rutgers	3	–	15	.167	11	–	20	.355
† 2008 Big East tournament winner As of April 7, 2008; Rankings from AP Poll; *Did not qualify for 2008 Big East tournament.

The 2007–08 Georgetown Hoyas men's basketball team was an NCAA Division I college basketball team competing in the Big East Conference representing Georgetown University. The team finished with a regular-season record of 27–5, and won the conference regular-season title on March 8, 2008, the first time Georgetown won the Big East regular-season championship in consecutive years and the only time in the original Big East of 1979–2013. It lost to Pittsburgh in the Big East tournament championship game. It was a number-two seed in the 2008 NCAA Division I men's basketball tournament, where it lost its second-round game to Davidson in a major upset. The team was ranked No. 11 in the final Associated Press Poll of the season and No. 12 in the postseason Coaches' Poll.

== Season recap ==
=== Regular season ===
==== Non-conference schedule ====
During the previous season, the Hoyas won both the Big East regular season championship and Big East tournament championship and advanced all the way to the Final Four in the 2007 NCA tournament, all for the first time for a Georgetown team since 1989. With four returning starters – senior center Roy Hibbert, senior point guard Jonathan Wallace, sophomore forward DaJuan Summers, and junior guard Jessie Sapp – Georgetown entered the 2007–08 season ranked No. 5, the Hoyas′ highest preseason ranking since 1995, even though 2007 Big East Conference Men's Basketball Player of the Year forward Jeff Green had left Georgetown during the offseason to enter the National Basketball Association draft, foregoing his senior year. With Green gone, Hibbert became the centerpiece of Georgetown's offense.

Georgetown opened the season with eight straight victories, the first time the Hoyas had opened a season 5–0 or better since 2003. The third game, at Ball State, had been scheduled as a rematch between John Thompson III and his younger brother, Ball State head coach and former Georgetown player Ronny Thompson, whose teams had played one another a year earlier at the Verizon Center in the brothers′ first meeting as head coaches, but Ronny Thompson had left Ball State during the summer of 2007, and John Thompson III faced a Ball State team coached by Bill Taylor instead. The seventh game was against Jacksonville, the first meeting between the teams since a December 1969 game that was declared a "no contest" after Georgetown head coach John Magee pulled his players off the court at Jacksonville out of fear for their safety in the face of a hostile crowd; 38 years later, the result of the meeting was an easy 87-55 Hoya victory. During the winning streak, Hibbert had 23 points and eight rebounds in a come-from-behind win against William and Mary, 12 points against Michigan in a game that began with Georgetown pulling out to a 43–19 lead, 16 points and seven rebounds against Ball State, his first double-double of the season (14 points and 10 rebounds) in 24 minutes of play at Old Dominion, and 14 points, nine rebounds, and five blocked shots against Alabama. Over the same stretch, Jonathan Wallace had 15 points against William & Mary, 13 points against Fairfield, and 11 points against Alabama, while Jessie Sapp scored 18 points against William & Mary and 12 points each against Michigan and Alabama. DaJuan Summers had 10 points against William & Mary, 16 points against Fairfield, 18 points against Alabama, and 14 against Jacksonville. Freshman guards Chris Wright and Austin Freeman also showed their potential as their college careers began: Wright scored 10 points against Michigan and 14 against Jacksonville, while Freeman had 10 points against Michigan, 11 points at Old Dominion, 15 against Jacksonville, and 21 points in a very physical 110-51 blow-out of Radford in which Georgetown shot 65 percent from the field for the game and 71 percent in the second half, scoring 100 or more points for the first time since John Thompson III became head coach in 2004. Sophomore guard Jeremiah Rivers came off the bench to have an outstanding defensive performance and five assists in the Fairfield game.

After opening 8–0, Georgetown faced its first ranked opponent of the season on December 22, visiting No. 2 Memphis, the winner of 36 straight home games. The Hoyas led by as many as eight points in the first half – the last time was 35–27 with 4:40 left in the half – but the Tigers then began to make shots more consistently and came back to take a 41–40 lead with 40 seconds left in the first half and a 43–40 lead at halftime. In the second half, Memphis missed 11 of its first 12 shots and Georgetown took a 46–45 lead with 15:40 left in the game, but the Tigers, who dominated Georgetown in second-half rebounds, then went on a 9–0 run to lead 54–46 with 12:18 left. After that, Memphis's lead stretched to double digits and reached 17 twice, with the Tigers making 17 of their 22 free throws in the second half and four Tigers scoring in double digits during the game. For Georgetown, Austin Freeman had a team-high 14 points, DaJuan Summers scored 13, and Patrick Ewing Jr., contributed 10, but Roy Hibbert only managed a season-low six points. Memphis outrebounded Georgetown 43–30 – a season low for the Hoyas – and won the game 85–71 to drop Georgetown to 8–1 on the year.

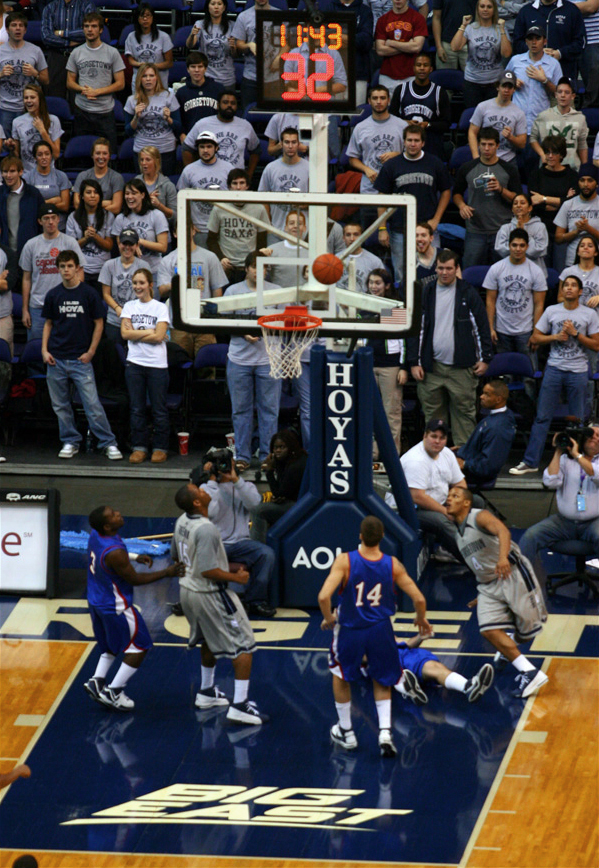
Georgetown (in gray) plays American at the Verizon Center on December 29, 2007.

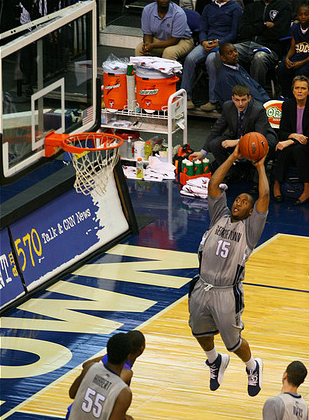
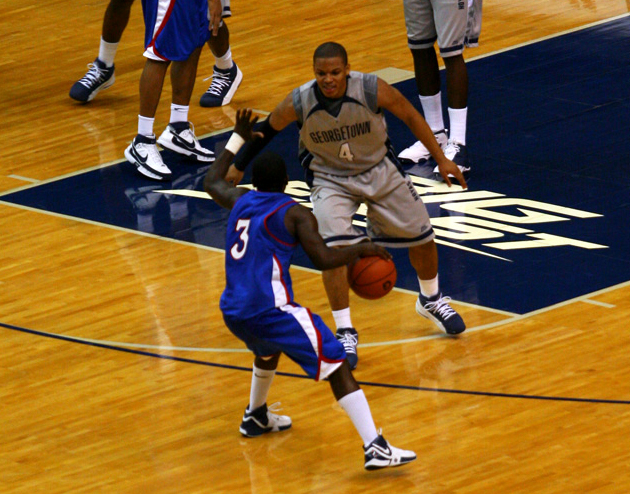
Austin Freeman takes a shot (left) and Chris Wright defends the perimeter (right) in the win against American at the Verizon Center on December 29, 2007.

The Hoyas finished 2007 and their nonconference schedule with wins over American – the first meeting between the crosstown rivals since December 1986 – and Fordham. American held a luncheon before its game with Georgetown, now ranked No. 8, to commemorate the 25th anniversary of the Eagles′ December 15, 1982, upset win over the then-No. 5 1982-83 Hoyas in December 1982 – touted as the biggest win in American's basketball history – but Georgetown dominated the Eagles this time around and won 78–51, with DaJuan Summers scoring 16 points, Chris Wright 13, and Hibbert 14, although Hibbert tied his career-low total of one rebound, the first time he had only one rebound since a game against South Florida in January 2006. The game against Fordham on New Year's Eve was the first meeting of the teams since January 1979, and the Hoyas, who had climbed to No. 7 in the Associated Press Poll that day, routed the Rams with Jonathan Wallace scoring a team-high 19 points, DaJuan Summers scoring 15 and grabbing nine rebounds, Austin Freeman contributing 12 points, and Jessie Sapp and Roy Hibbert adding 11 each. During the Fordham game, Wallace reached two career benchmarks, becoming the 39th Hoya to score 1,000 points in his career and scoring his 190th three-point shot, moving ahead of Kevin Braswell′s team record of 189 three-pointers set between 1988 and 1992.

==== Conference schedule ====
Georgetown extended its winning streak to five – opening 3–0 in conference play – as it began the Big East season in the new year of 2008 as the best team in the country in points allowed, with opponents averaging only 55.2 points per game, and in field goal percentage defense, with opponents shooting only 35.2 percent from the field against the Hoyas. The season opener saw the Hoyas beat Rutgers for the sixth time in a row and seventh time in eight games, with Austin Freeman scoring 13 points, Jonathan Wallace 11, and DaJuan Summers and Jessie Sapp 10 each. Against DePaul, Roy Hibbert had a double-double (17 points and 11 rebounds) and five assists, while Freeman scored 13 points and Jonathan Wallace and Jessie Sapp had 12 each. Four days later in a back-and-forth game against Connecticut, Hibbert had a 20-point, eight-rebound performance that he capped off with a rare three-pointer – making him 2-for-2 in three-pointers during his Georgetown career – with less than five seconds left in the game. It turned out to be the game-winning shot in a 72–69 victory, giving the Hoyas two consecutive wins over the Huskies for the first time since a six-game Hoya winning streak from 1991 to 1993. Patrick Ewing Jr., scored 14 points against Connecticut.

Entering the game as the best-shooting team from the field in the country at 51.6 percent, the Hoyas went on the road to face their first ranked Big East opponent, No. 15 Pittsburgh, winners of 12 straight games on their home court, on January 14. Ronald Ramón and Keith Benjamin came off the bench to replace injured starters Levance Fields and Mike Cook and scored 18 points each for the Panthers, while Pittsburgh freshman center DeJuan Blair, 7 inches (18 cm) shorter than Roy Hibbert, matched up well against Hibbert, scoring 15 points and grabbing nine rebounds, and the Panthers outrebounded the Hoyas 37–33. Although Hibbert scored 12 points, Jonathan Wallace scored 14, and Vernon Macklin contributed 10, the Hoyas shot only 44.2 percent from the field and 3-for-20 (15 percent) from three-point range and never led during the game; they began the second half behind only 27–26, but Pittsburgh started the second half with a 15–4 run to take a 42–30 lead. Georgetown scored eight consecutive points to close to 47–44 with 9:05 left in the game, but the Panthers responded by scoring six points of their own to stretch their led back to 52–44 with 8:14 left. Pittsburgh went on to upset Georgetown, 69–60, to break the Hoyas's five-game winning streak and drop Georgetown to 13–2 for the year and 3–1 in the Big East.

Following the setback against Pittsburgh, the Hoyas – with their defense ranked second in the country in opponents′ shooting percentage, allowing opponents to shoot only 35.8 percent from the field, and sixth in points allowed, with opponents averaging only 56.7 points per game – began another winning streak that ultimately reached six games. By the time they entered the fourth game of the streak, facing St. John's at Madison Square Garden on January 30, they ranked first in the country in opponents′ shooting percentage at 35.8 percent and fifth in points allowed at 57.5, and they handed St. John's a defeat that tied its worst Big East loss in history, a 74–42 rout – equaled only by a 72–42 loss, also at the hands of the Hoyas, on January 6, 1982 – in which the Red Storm shot only 21.3 percent from the field and Georgetown led 41–14 at halftime and opened the second half with a 12–0 run to make the lead 53–14. During the streak, Hibbert had 21 points and five assists against Notre Dame, 15 points in a close overtime victory over Syracuse, a double-double (12 points and 10 rebounds) in a narrow, come-from-behind win at West Virginia, 11 points in the blow-out of St. John's, 16 points and nine rebounds against Seton Hall, and 13 points and eight rebounds in a hard-fought, come-from-behind win over South Florida. Jonathan Wallace had 15 points against Syracuse, while DaJuan Summers had a double-double (17 points and a career-high 11 rebounds) against Notre Dame, and a career-best 24 points against South Florida. Jessie Sapp scored 15 points against West Virginia, 10 points against St. John's, and 17 points against Seton Hall, and Patrick Ewing Jr., contributed a career-high 16 points against Seton Hall. Austin Freeman scored 16 points against Notre Dame, while Vernon Macklin had a career-high and game-high 18 points against St. John's,

The Hoyas were ranked No. 6 and sported a 19–2 overall record and a conference record of 9–1 when they visited Louisville on February 9. With strong defensive performances on both sides, the Cardinals broke the Hoyas′ winning streak, dominating the Hoyas in the second half to come from behind for an upset victory in which both Roy Hibbert and Austin Freeman scored 14 points. Georgetown bounced back to beat Villanova 55-53 two days later, with Jonathan Wallace sinking two free throws with a tenth of a second left to give him 15 points and Georgetown its first home win against the Wildcats since January 27, 1997. Roy Hibbert had 13 and DaJuan Summers 12 points against Villanova. Ranked No. 8 and visiting Syracuse five days later for the second game of the season against the Orange, Georgetown suffered another setback, falling 21 points behind in the first half and losing 77–70 despite a career-high 26 points from Jonathan Wallace, a 14-point performance for DaJuan Summers, and 11 points each by Roy Hibbert and Jessie Sapp.

The 1-2 stretch caused the Hoyas to drop to No. 12 in the AP Poll, but they closed out the regular season with five straight wins. Hibbert scored 18 points and had eight rebounds and Wallace contributed 14 points against Providence on February 18; in a rout of Cincinnati five days later that stretched the Hoyas winning streak at the Verizon Center to 19 games and put them a half-game ahead of Louisville to take first place in the Big East, Jessie Sapp had a game-high 16 points, Austin Freeman scored 13, and Hibbert had 12 points and five blocked shots; and in a rematch against St. John's on February 27 that stretched the Verizon Center winning streak to 20, Summers scored 21 points on strong three-point shooting and Hibbert had 17 points.

The Hoyas topped off the five-game streak with back-to-back wins over ranked opponents. Ranked No. 11 and tied with Louisville for first place in the conference, Georgetown visited No. 21 Marquette on March 1. Marquette led 32–28 at halftime and went on a 13–2 run to take an 11-point lead with 12 minutes left in the game. Georgetown closed the gap, and with 2.8 seconds left in regulation and the Hoyas behind 63–60, Golden Eagles point guard Dominic James fouled Jonathan Wallace on a three-point attempt, Wallace sank all three free throws to tie the game and force overtime, and Georgetown then outscored Marquette to win 70–68, with Wallace and Hibbert finishing the game with 20 points each. A week later, ranked No. 11, Georgetown finished the regular season with a rematch with No. 12 Louisville. Although the Cardinals tied their season high with 14 steals, they shot only 4-for-18 (22 percent) from three-point range and 10-for-18 (55.6 percent) in free throws. DaJuan Summers took only one shot in the second half, but that was a three-pointer that put Georgetown ahead 55–52 with 40 seconds remaining. It turned out to be the winning shot and final score, as Louisville missed three straight three-point attempts to end the game. Austin Freeman had 15 points and Roy Hibbert, playing the final home game of his college career, had a 12-point, eight-rebound performance.

With the regular-season-ending victory over Louisville, No. 11 Georgetown finished with an overall record of 25-4 and a Big East record of 15–3, and repeated as Big East regular-season champion for the first time in history. It was only the second time in history and the first time since 1988 that the Big East regular-season title was determined in a game between teams tied for first place entering the season's final day.

=== Big East tournament ===
With a No. 1 seed in the Big East tournament for the second year in a row and a No.9 national ranking, Georgetown had a bye in the first round. In the quarterfinals, the Hoyas faced eighth seed Villanova, also for the second year in a row. Villanova, a heavy underdog, fell behind 34–19 with 3:58 left in the first half, but over the rest of the first half and into the second half the Wildcats went on a 28–9 run to that gave them the lead, 47–43, with 13:06 left in the game. Georgetown took the lead back at 51–50 with 12:04 left in the game and pulled away to an 82–63 victory. Although Villanova shot 23-for-28 (82.1 percent) from the free-throw line and Roy Hibbert did not score during the game and had only four rebounds before fouling out with 5:09 to play, Georgetown made up for it by setting both a Big East tournament record and a school record by connecting on 17 three-point shots during the game, shooting 17-for-28 (60.7 percent) from three-point range. Jessie Sapp hit on six three-point shots and scored a career-high 23 points, Jonathan Wallace had five three-pointers and 20 points, and DaJuan Summers had 19 points and three three-pointers.

In a semifinal game the next day, Georgetown faced fifth seed West Virginia. The Hoyas staked themselves to a 33–21 lead at halftime and Jonathan Wallace hit a three-point jumper 54 seconds into the second half to stretch the lead to 36–21. But then the Mountaineers scored on 10 straight possessions to close to 49–45 with 12:16 remaining. After that, however, the Hoyas began to pull away steadily, winning 72–55. Roy Hibbert returned to form with a double-double (25 points and 13 rebounds, both season highs) including the third three-pointer of his career, making him a perfect 3-for-3 in career three-pointers, while Jessie Sapp scored 13 points and had seven rebounds.

Georgetown advanced to the Big East tournament final for the second year in a row – its first back-to-back appearances in the final since 1991 and 1992 – to face No. 17 Pittsburgh, the tournament's seventh seed, with a chance to repeat as tournament champions for the first time since 1984 and 1985. Although they shot only 22-for-44 (50 percent) from the free-throw line, the Panthers outrebounded the Hoyas 41-29 and attacked the net with a balanced offense. Pittsburgh led 31–28 at halftime and 59–49 with 3:45 remaining in the game. Georgetown closed to a 65–60 deficit with 1:20 left to play, but Pittsburgh's Ronald Ramón went 5-for-6 from the free-throw line over the last 1:07 and Pittsburgh took the tournament championship with a 74–65 upset victory. It was the first defeat for the Hoyas in the 16 Big East tournament games they had played in as the tournament's top seed since the tournament began in 1980. Roy Hibbert had 17 points in his final Big East game, and Jonathan Wallace had 12.

=== NCAA tournament ===
With a 27–5 record and ranked No. 8 in the country, Georgetown received an at-large bid to the 2008 NCAA tournament, its third consecutive NCAA tournament appearance. Seeded second in the Midwest Regional, the Hoyas began their pursuit of their first back-to-back Final Four appearances since 1984 and 1985 by facing 15th-seeded Maryland-Baltimore County (UMBC) in the first round. The Hoyas dominated the undersized Retrievers, shooting 51 percent from the field and holding UMBC to 32-percent shooting and completely scoreless over a seven-minute stretch in the first half, during which the Retrievers missed eight straight shots: A Chris Wright three-point jumper gave the Hoyas a 31–17 lead with three minutes left in the half before UMBC's scoring drought ended. Georgetown went on a 22–5 run late in the first half, posted a 34–22 halftime lead, and won 66–47. Roy Hibbert exhibited thorough control inside and had 13 points, Jonathan Wallace also had 13, Austin Freeman contributed 11, and Patrick Ewing Jr., who filled in at center when Hibbert was on the bench, finished with 10 points.

In the second round, Georgetown met the region's tenth seed, No. 23 Davidson, the winner of 23 straight games, led by junior point guard Stephen Curry, a future National Basketball Association star. Before defeating Gonzaga in the first round two days earlier, Davidson had not won an NCAA tournament game in 39 years, but when asked about the match-up with Davidson after the win over UMBC, John Thompson III said, "Watching Davidson makes me feel worried...At this point, you just need to figure out how to get a win and move on." Despite Thompson's qualms, heavily favored Georgetown seemed to have the game under control in the first half: After a 2–0 Davidson lead, the Hoyas – featuring the country's top defense entering the game, allowing opponents to shoot only 37 percent from the field and allowing an average of only 57.6 points per game – built a 38–27 lead by halftime. Shooting 71 percent from the floor early in the second half and with Curry missing 10 of his first 12 shots of the game, Georgetown extended the lead to 46–29 with 17:56 left to play. But then Curry came alive, and the entire character of the game changed. Led by Curry, Davidson went on a 16–2 run that cut Georgetown's lead to 50–48 with 8:47 left to play. Thanks largely to Curry, for whom the Hoyas suddenly had no answer, the Wildcats went on to take a 60–58 lead – their first lead since 2-0 – with 4:40 left, and Curry then scored a three-pointer and a two-pointer to stretch the lead to 65–60. Curry made six of his last nine shots from the field and five of six free throws in the final 23 seconds and scored 30 points – 25 of them in the second half – and Davidson upset Georgetown 74–70 to extend its winning streak, the longest active streak in the country at the time, to 24 games and bring Georgetown's season to a stunning end. The Hoyas shot 63 percent from the field as a team – Jessie Sapp scored 14 points, Jonathan Wallace had 12, and DaJuan Summers finished with 10 – but Roy Hibbert managed only six points and a single rebound and Georgetown committed 20 turnovers. The loss to Davidson was the first in what became a pattern of upsets in, and early exits from, the NCAA tournament over the next several years.

For the season, Roy Hibbert shot 60.9 percent from the field and finished with 13.5 points per game, while Jonathan Wallace shot 49.4 percent from the field overall and 44.7 percent from three-point range, averaging 10.7 points per game. DaJuan Summers shot 42.9 percent and averaged 11.1 points per game, and Jessie Sapp shot 43.9 percent and averaged 9.7 points per game, while Patrick Ewing. Jr., shot 52.9 percent from the field, averaging 6.1 percent from the field.

At the end of the school year, a major turnover took place in the roster. Hibbert, Ewing, Wallace, and Tyler Crawford all graduated. The Toronto Raptors drafted Hibbert in the 2008 NBA draft and subsequently traded the rights to him to the Indiana Pacers, with whom he began his NBA career. The Sacramento Kings drafted Ewing in the same draft. Wallace went undrafted in 2008, but played in the NBA Summer League, the NBA Developmental League, Europe, and Angola from 2008 to 2016, when he returned to Georgetown as a special assistant coach under John Thompson III. Sophomore center Vernon Macklin decided in late April to leave the team in search of greater playing time, announcing in May that he would transfer to Florida; he sat out the 2008–09 season, then started 71 games for Florida between 2009 and 2011 and was selected by the Detroit Pistons in the 2011 NBA draft. Sophomore guard Jeremiah Rivers also departed, transferring to Indiana, where he believed he had a better chance of showcasing his talents than he could in Georgetown's "Princeton offense."

Georgetown finished the season with a record of 28–6, and its .824 winning percentage was its best since 1995-96. Postseason, the Hoyas were ranked No. 11 in the Associated Press Poll and No. 12 in the Coaches Poll for the year.

== Roster ==
#	Name	Height	Weight (lbs.)	Position	Class	Hometown	Previous Team(s)
1	Vernon Macklin	6'9"	230	C	So.	Portsmouth, VA, U.S.	Hargrave Military Academy
2	Jonathan Wallace	6'1"	195	G	Sr.	Harvest, AL, U.S.	Sparkman HS
3	DaJuan Summers	6'8"	249	F	So.	Baltimore, MD, U.S.	McDonogh School
4	Chris Wright	6'1"	205	G	Fr.	Bowie, MD, U.S.	St. John's College HS
5	Jeremiah Rivers	6'4"	210	G	So.	Winter Park, FL, U.S.	Winter Park HS
10	Nikita Mescheriakov	6'8"	205	F	Fr.	Minsk, Belarus	St. John's College HS
11	Bryon Jansen	6'6"	205	F	Jr.	Kent, WA, U.S.	Seattle Christian Schools
15	Austin Freeman	6'4"	220	G	Fr.	Mitchellville, MD, U.S.	DeMatha HS
21	Jessie Sapp	6'3"	210	G	Jr.	New York, NY, U.S.	National Christian Academy (Md.)
22	Tyler Crawford	6'4"	205	G	Sr.	Staunton, VA, U.S.	Robert E. Lee HS
31	Omar Wattad	6'4"	210	G/F	Fr.	Johnson City, TN, U.S.	Science Hill HS
33	Patrick Ewing Jr.	6'8"	240	F	Sr.	Marietta, GA, U.S.	Indiana University
55	Roy Hibbert	7'2"	275	C	Sr.	Adelphi, MD, U.S.	Georgetown Preparatory School

== Rankings ==
Ranking movement Legend: ██ Improvement in ranking. ██ Decrease in ranking. ██ Not ranked the previous week. RV=Others receiving votes.
Poll	Pre Nov 5	Wk 2 Nov 12	Wk 3 Nov 19	Wk 4 Nov 26	Wk 5 Dec 3	Wk 6 Dec 10	Wk 7 Dec 17	Wk 8 Dec 24	Wk 9 Dec 31	Wk 10 Jan 7	Wk 11 Jan 14	Wk 12 Jan 21	Wk 13 Jan 28	Wk 14 Feb 4	Wk 15 Feb 11	Wk 16 Feb 18	Wk 17 Feb 25	Wk 18 Mar 3	Wk 19 Mar 10	Post Wk 1 Mar 18	Post Wk 3 Mar 31
AP	5	5	5	5	5	5	5	8	7	7	5	9	6	6	8	12	11	11	9	8	(Note: No Associated Press Poll this week.)
Coaches	5	5	5	5	4	4	4	8	7	8	6	9	6	6	8	11	10	10	9	8	12

== 2007-08 schedule and results ==
Date time, TV	Rank^{#}	Opponent^{#}	Result	Record	Site (attendance) city, state
Regular season
November 10, 2007*; 12:00 p.m.	No. 5	William & Mary	W 68–53	1–0	Verizon Center (11,364); Washington, DC
November 15, 2007*; 7:30 p.m.	No. 5	Michigan	W 74–52	2–0	Verizon Center (12,653); Washington, DC
November 21, 2007; 7:30 p.m.	No. 5	at Ball State	W 57–48	3–0	John E. Worthen Arena (4,381); Muncie, IN
November 28, 2007*; 7:00 p.m., MASN	No. 5	at Old Dominion	W 66–48	4–0	Constant Convocation Center (8,424); Norfolk, VA
December 1, 2007*; 1:00 p.m.	No. 5	Fairfield	W 61–49	5–0	Verizon Center (8,764); Washington, DC
December 5, 2007*; 7:00 p.m., ESPN	No. 5	at Alabama; Pizza Hut SEC/BIG EAST Invitational	W 70–60	6–0	BJCC Arena (10,411); Birmingham, AL
December 9, 2007*; 1:00 p.m.	No. 5	Jacksonville	W 87–55	7–0	Verizon Center (8,216); Washington, DC
December 15, 2007*; 7:30 p.m., MASN	No. 5	Radford	W 110–51	8–0	McDonough Gymnasium (2,634); Washington, DC
December 22, 2007*; 12:00 p.m., ESPN	No. 5	at No. 2 Memphis	L 71–85	8–1	FedExForum (18,864); Memphis, TN
December 29, 2007*; 1:00 p.m., MASN	No. 8	American	W 78–51	9–1	Verizon Center (10,564); Washington, DC
December 31, 2007*; 2:00 p.m.	No. 7	Fordham	W 82–55	10–1	Verizon Center (7,845); Washington, DC
January 5, 2008; 2:00 p.m., MASN	No. 7	at Rutgers	W 58–46	11–1 (1–0)	Louis Brown Athletic Center (7,938); Piscataway, NJ
January 8, 2008; 9:00 p.m., ESPNU	No. 7	at DePaul	W 76–60	12–1 (2–0)	Allstate Arena (11,252); Rosemont, IL
January 12, 2008; 2:00 p.m., ESPN	No. 7	Connecticut; Rivalry	W 72–69	13–1 (3–0)	Verizon Center (20,035); Washington, DC
January 14, 2008; 7:00 p.m., ESPN	No. 5	at No. 15 Pittsburgh	L 60–69	13–2 (3–1)	Petersen Events Center (12,508); Pittsburgh, PA
January 19, 2008; 12:00 p.m., MASN	No. 5	Notre Dame	W 84–65	14–2 (4–1)	Verizon Center (19,286); Washington, DC
January 21, 2008; 7:00 p.m., ESPN	No. 9	Syracuse; Rivalry	W 64–62 ^{OT}	15–2 (5–1)	Verizon Center (20,035); Washington, DC
January 26, 2008; 7:00 p.m., ESPN	No. 9	at West Virginia	W 58–57	16–2 (6–1)	WVU Coliseum (14,048); Morgantown, WV
January 30, 2008; 7:00 p.m., MASN	No. 6	at St. John's	W 74–42	17–2 (7–1)	Madison Square Garden (9,924); New York City, NY
February 2, 2008; 12:00 p.m., MASN	No. 6	Seton Hall	W 73–61	18–2 (8–1)	Verizon Center (14,528); Washington, DC
February 5, 2008; 7:30, MASN	No. 6	South Florida	W 63–53	19–2 (9–1)	Verizon Center (8,316); Washington, DC
February 9, 2008; 9:00 p.m., ESPN	No. 6	at Louisville; ESPN College GameDay	L 51–59	19–3 (9–2)	Freedom Hall (20,083); Louisville, KY
February 11, 2008; 7:00 p.m., ESPN	No. 8	Villanova	W 55–53	20–3 (10–2)	Verizon Center (17,575); Washington, DC
February 16, 2008; 12:00 p.m., ESPN	No. 8	at Syracuse; Rivalry	L 70–77	20–4 (10–3)	Carrier Dome (31,327); Syracuse, NY
February 18, 2008; 4:00 p.m., ESPN2	No. 12	at Providence	W 68–58	21–4 (11–3)	Dunkin Donuts Center (11,689); Providence, RI
February 23, 2008; 12:00 p.m., MASN	No. 12	Cincinnati	W 73–53	22–4 (12–3)	Verizon Center (17,337); Washington, DC
February 27, 2008; 9:00 p.m., ESPNU	No. 11	St. John's	W 64–52	23–4 (13–3)	Verizon Center (9,018); Washington, DC
March 1, 2008; 2:00 p.m., CBS	No. 11	at No. 21 Marquette	W 70–68 ^{OT}	24–4 (14–3)	Bradley Center (19,085); Milwaukee, WI
March 8, 2008; 12:00 p.m., CBS	No. 11	No. 12 Louisville	W 55–52	25–4 (15–3)	Verizon Center (19,116); Washington, DC
Big East tournament
March 13, 2008*; 12:00 p.m., ESPN	No. 9	vs. Villanova; Second Round	W 82–63	26–4	Madison Square Garden (19,562); New York City, NY
March 14, 2008*; 7:00 p.m., ESPN	No. 9	vs. West Virginia; Semifinal	W 72–55	27–4	Madison Square Garden (19,562); New York City, NY
March 15, 2008*; 9:00 p.m., ESPN	No. 9	vs. No. 17 Pittsburgh; Final	L 65–74	27–5	Madison Square Garden (19,562); New York City, NY
NCAA tournament
March 21, 2008*; 3:00 p.m., CBS	No. 8	vs. UMBC; First Round	W 66–47	28–5	RBC Center (19,477); Raleigh, NC
March 23, 2008*; 2:50 p.m., CBS	No. 8	vs. No. 23 Davidson; Second Round	L 70–74	28–6	RBC Center (19,477); Raleigh, NC
*Non-conference game. ^{#}Rankings from AP Poll. (#) Tournament seedings in parentheses.

== Awards and honors ==
=== Big East Conference honors ===
Postseason honors
Honors	Player	Position	Date awarded	Ref.
All-Big East First Team	Roy Hibbert	C	March 10, 2008	
All-Big East Second Team	Jonathan Wallace	G	March 10, 2008	
Big East All-Rookie Team	Austin Freeman	G	March 10, 2008	
