= Doug Cook (basketball) =

American basketball player

Personal information
- Born: 1948 (age 77–78) Ho-Ho-Kus, New Jersey, U.S.
- Listed height: 6 ft 6 in (1.98 m)
- Listed weight: 220 lb (100 kg)

Career information
- High school: Ridgewood (Ridgewood, New Jersey)
- College: Davidson (1967–1970)
- NBA draft: 1970: 2nd round, 22nd overall pick
- Drafted by: Cincinnati Royals
- Playing career: 1970–1971
- Position: Center

Career history
- 1970–1971: Virtus Bologna

Career highlights
- First-team All-Southern (1970); 2× Second-team All-Southern (1968, 1969)
- Stats at Basketball Reference

Douglas T. Cook (born 1948) is an American former professional basketball player. He played college basketball for the Davidson Wildcats and was selected by the Cincinnati Royals as the 22nd overall pick in the 1970 NBA draft. Cook played professionally for one season with Virtus Bologna in Italy.

== Early life and high school career ==
Cook was born in Ho-Ho-Kus, New Jersey in 1948. He graduated in 1966 from Ridgewood High School in Ridgewood, New Jersey. Cook earned the starting role on the basketball team as a sophomore. He scored 1,287 points in three varsity seasons including averaging 23.9 points per game as a senior. Cook was recruited by over 100 colleges but decided to choose Davidson College because of its small college atmosphere and head basketball coach, Lefty Driesell.

Cook was inducted into the Ridgewood High School Athletic Hall of Fame in 2004.

== College career ==
Cook played for the Davidson Wildcats from 1967 to 1970 as a center. He scored 1,221 points during his career. Cook and the Wildcats made the regional final of the 1969 NCAA University Division basketball tournament; he stated in a 2011 interview, "that was probably the best team Davidson ever had." He was selected to the All-Southern Conference first-team in 1970 when he averaged a double-double for the season with 15.6 points and 10.2 rebounds per game.

Cook was inducted into the Davidson College Athletic Hall of Fame in 2003.

== Professional career ==
Cook was selected in the second round of the 1970 NBA draft by the Cincinnati Royals. He arrived at rookie camp out of shape and failed to impress head coach Bob Cousy. Cook spent the 1970–71 season with Virtus Bologna in Italy but struggled during his only year with the team. He broke his ankle twice and decided to retire from playing at the end of the season. Cook reflected on his career: "To me, basketball was a lot of fun in high school and college but professionally it wasn't a lot of fun."

== Post-playing career ==
After Cook returned to the United States, he settled in Essex Fells, New Jersey, and joined Bollinger Insurance of Short Hills, New Jersey, in 1973. He spent 38 years with the company and had been working as corporate vice president at the time of his retirement in 2011.

Cook served on the Mike Maloy Scholarship Committee at Davidson College in 2012.

== Personal life ==
Cook has three daughters. He is an avid golfer.
