= Luka Brajković =

Austrian basketball player (born 1999)

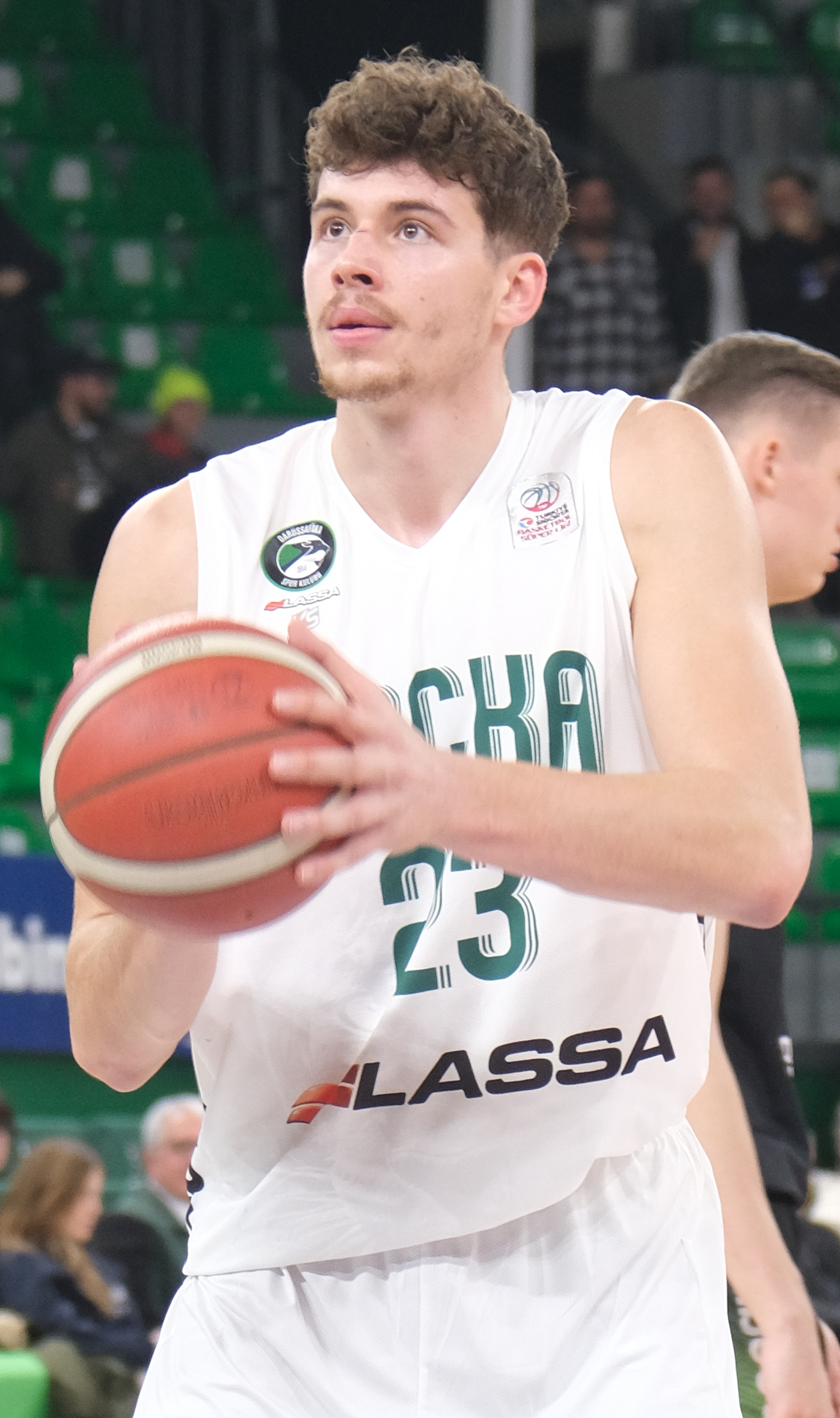
- Brajković with Darüşşafaka in 2024

No. 17 – Pallacanestro Trieste
- Position: Center / Power forward
- League: LBA

Personal information
- Born: 26 June 1999 (age 27) Feldkirch, Austria
- Listed height: 6 ft 10 in (2.08 m)
- Listed weight: 250 lb (113 kg)

Career information
- High school: Gymnasium Schillerstraße (Feldkirch, Austria)
- College: Davidson (2018–2022)
- NBA draft: 2022: undrafted
- Playing career: 2015–present

Career history
- 2015–2018: Dornbirn Lions
- 2022–2023: Río Breogán
- 2023–2024: Kolossos Rodou
- 2024: Pistoia 2000
- 2024–2025: Darüşşafaka
- 2025–2026: Cedevita Olimpija
- 2026–present: Pallacanestro Trieste

Career highlights
- Greek All-Star (2023); Atlantic 10 Player of the Year (2022); First-team All-Atlantic 10 (2022)

Luka Brajković (born 26 June 1999) is a Serbian-Austrian professional basketball player for Pallacanestro Trieste of the Lega Basket Serie A (LBA). He played college basketball for the Davidson Wildcats.

== Early career ==
Brajković joined the Dornbirn Lions of the Basketball Zweite Liga in 2015 and did not earn a salary to preserve collegiate eligibility. During the 2016–17 season, he averaged 14.4 points, 8.7 rebounds, and 2.2 blocks per game. Brajković considered moving to Germany following the season, but it did not occur. In March 2018, he committed to playing college basketball for Davidson over offers from Stanford, Purdue and Penn State. He chose the Wildcats in part because head coach Bob McKillop travelled to Austria twice to recruit him.

== College career ==
Coming into his freshman season, Brajković helped replace the scoring of the departed Peyton Aldridge at Davidson. As a freshman, Brajković averaged 11.1 points and six rebounds per game. He had to adjust to the faster speed of the American college game, including changing his passing motion. He averaged 10.3 points and five rebounds per game as a sophomore. As a junior, Brajković averaged 10.9 points and six rebounds per game. Over the summer, he trained in Serbia against professional players. On 5 February 2022, Brajković scored a career-high 30 points as well as eight rebounds in a 78–73 win over George Washington. He was named Atlantic 10 Player of the Year.

== Professional career ==
=== Rio Breogán (2022–2023) ===
On 6 August 2022, Brajković signed with Rio Breogán of the Spanish Liga ACB.

=== Kolossos Rodou (2023–2024) ===
On 3 August 2023, Brajković moved to Greek club Kolossos Rodou.

=== Pistoia Basket 2000 (2024) ===
On 29 May 2024, Brajković signed with Pistoia Basket 2000 of the Lega Basket Serie A (LBA).

=== Darüşşafaka (2024–2025) ===
On 1 November 2024, Brajković signed with Darüşşafaka of the Basketbol Süper Ligi (BSL).

=== Cedevita Olimpija (2025–2026) ===
On 18 July 2025, Brajković signed with Cedevita Olimpija of the Slovenian Basketball League (1. SKL), the ABA League, and the EuroCup.

=== Pallacanestro Trieste (2026–present) ===
On 25 September 2026, Brajković signed with Pallacanestro Trieste of the Italian Lega Basket Serie A (LBA).

== National team career ==
Brajković has represented Austria in several international basketball competitions. In the 2017 FIBA U18 European Championship Division B, he averaged 18.6 points, 10.6 rebounds, and 0.9 assists per game.

== Career statistics ==
Legend
| GP | Games played | GS | Games started | MPG | Minutes per game |
| FG% | Field goal percentage | 3P% | 3-point field goal percentage | FT% | Free throw percentage |
| RPG | Rebounds per game | APG | Assists per game | SPG | Steals per game |
| BPG | Blocks per game | PPG | Points per game | **Bold** | Career high |

=== College ===
| Year | Team | GP | GS | MPG | FG% | 3P% | FT% | RPG | APG | SPG | BPG | PPG |
|---|---|---|---|---|---|---|---|---|---|---|---|---|
| 2018–19 | Davidson | **34** | 33 | 24.9 | .549 | .357 | .704 | 6.0 | 1.4 | **.4** | **1.1** | 11.1 |
| 2019–20 | Davidson | 30 | 30 | 24.5 | .519 | .381 | **.716** | 5.0 | 1.6 | .1 | .9 | 10.3 |
| 2020–21 | Davidson | 21 | 21 | 26.8 | .536 | .315 | .623 | 6.0 | 1.8 | .3 | .9 | 10.9 |
| 2021–22 | Davidson | **34** | **34** | **29.5** | **.583** | **.409** | .637 | **7.1** | **2.5** | .3 | **1.1** | **14.4** |
| Career | | 119 | 118 | 26.4 | .551 | .373 | .673 | 6.1 | 1.8 | .3 | 1.0 | 11.8 |

=== LIGA ACB ===
| Year | Team | GP | GS | MPG | FG% | 3P% | FT% | RPG | APG | SPG | BPG | PPG |
|---|---|---|---|---|---|---|---|---|---|---|---|---|
| 2022–23 | Río Breogán | 32 | 0 | 9.3 | .494 | .143 | .600 | 1.7 | 0.4 | 0.2 | 0.3 | 3.2 |

== Personal life ==
Luka was born to Slađan and Sanja Brajković. He has a brother named Filip.
