= Matt McKillop =

American basketball coach (born 1983)

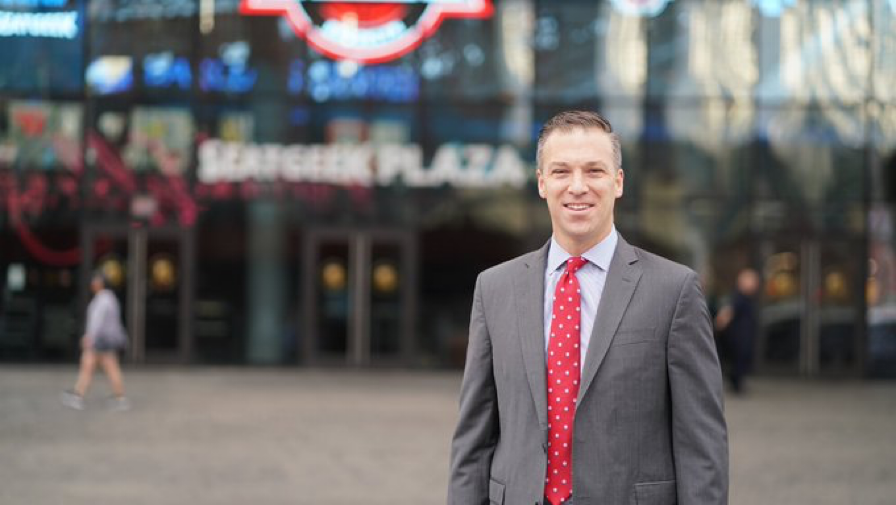

Current position
- Title: Head coach
- Team: Davidson
- Conference: Atlantic 10
- Record: 71–65 (.522)

Biographical details
- Born: March 22, 1983 (age 43)

Playing career
- 2002–2006: Davidson

Coaching career (HC unless noted)
- 2007–2008: Emory (assistant)
- 2008–2022: Davidson (assistant)
- 2022–present: Davidson

Head coaching record
- Overall: 71–65 (.522)
- Tournaments: 0–1 (NIT)

Matt McKillop (born March 22, 1983) is an American college basketball coach who is the head coach of the Davidson Wildcats men's basketball program of the Atlantic 10 Conference. He succeeded his father Bob who was the coach of the Wildcats for 33 years.

== Playing career ==
McKillop was a three year starter at Davidson under his father Bob McKillop where he averaged 8.2 points per game and made two NCAA Tournament appearances. He initially signed to play professional basketball in the Czech Republic before suffering a knee injury.

== Coaching career ==
Following one year as an assistant at Emory, McKillop joined his father's coaching staff as an assistant in 2008. Following his father's retirement in 2022, McKillop was named the head coach of Davidson.

== Head coaching record ==
=== College ===
Record table
Season	Team	Overall	Conference	Standing	Postseason
Davidson Wildcats (Atlantic 10 Conference) (2022–present)
2022–23	Davidson	16–16	8–10	T–8th	
2023–24	Davidson	15–17	5–13	T–13th	
2024–25	Davidson	17–16	6–12	12th	
2025–26	Davidson	20–14	10–8	6th	NIT First Round
2026–27	Davidson	3–2	0–0		
Davidson:		71–65 (.522)	29–43 (.403)		
Total:		71–65 (.522)			
