= Jeremiah Rivers =

American basketball player (born 1987)

Personal information
- Born: July 27, 1987 (age 39) Milwaukee, Wisconsin
- Listed height: 6 ft 5 in (1.96 m)
- Listed weight: 210 lb (95 kg)

Career information
- High school: Winter Park (Winter Park, Florida)
- College: Georgetown (2006–2008); Indiana (2009–2011)
- Playing career: 2011–2013
- Position: Point guard / shooting guard

Career history
- 2011–2012: Mega Vizura
- 2012–2013: Maine Red Claws
- Stats at Basketball Reference

Jeremiah Jordan Rivers (born July 27, 1987) is an American former professional basketball player. He played college basketball at Georgetown University, before transferring to Indiana University. He previously attended Winter Park High School in Florida. He is the son of former NBA player and Milwaukee Bucks head coach Doc Rivers, and the older brother of former NBA player Austin Rivers.

== Pro career ==
Upon college graduation, Rivers signed with Mega Vizura from Serbia in August 2011. However, Rivers injured his ankle in January 2012, and missed the rest of the 2011–12 season. He played 14 games, averaging 6.2 points per game.

After recovering from double ankle surgery, Rivers participated in the 2012 Las Vegas NBA Summer League, averaging 3.5 points and 1.8 rebounds in four games with the New York Knicks.

== Personal life ==
Rivers is the oldest son of head coach Doc Rivers and Kristen Rivers (née Campion). His younger sister Callie played volleyball for the University of Florida and is married to NBA player Seth Curry. His younger brother Austin is currently an analyst, and his youngest brother, Spencer played for UC Irvine.
