= Bob Light =

American basketball and tennis coach

Biographical details
- Born: April 27, 1927; St. Louis, Missouri, U.S.
- Died: May 11, 2015 (aged 88); Lenoir, North Carolina, U.S.

Playing career
- 1946–1950: Washington University

Coaching career (HC unless noted)

Basketball
- 1957–1972: Appalachian State

Tennis
- 1974–1988: Appalachian State

Robert George Light (April 27, 1927 – May 11, 2015) of Boone, North Carolina, was an American basketball and tennis coach for Appalachian State University.

Light was a standout basketball and Tennis player for Washington University in St. Louis from 1946 to 1950, and was named the school's most outstanding athlete for the 1949–50 year. From 1957 to 1972, Light served as the head basketball coach for Appalachian State, compiling a 212-179 (.542) record. His 15 seasons mark the longest tenure in Mountaineer history. In 1974, Light was named head tennis coach and went on to win 255 matches in that capacity.

Light, a member of the Washington University and Appalachian State athletic Halls of Fame, as well as the North Carolina Tennis Hall of Fame, died on May 11, 2015, at the age of 88.

He resided in Boone, NC with his wife, the former Patricia Parker of Jerseyville, Illinois, from 1957 until he entered palliative care in Lenoir, NC. Together they had four sons.
