= Fred Hetzel =

American basketball player (born 1942)

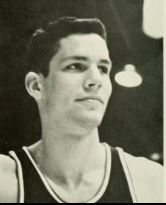
- Hetzel as a sophomore at Davidson

Personal information
- Born: July 21, 1942 (age 84) Washington, D.C., U.S.
- Listed height: 6 ft 8 in (2.03 m)
- Listed weight: 220 lb (100 kg)

Career information
- High school: Woodrow Wilson (Washington, D.C.); Landon School (Bethesda, Maryland)
- College: Davidson (1962–1965)
- NBA draft: 1965: 1st round, 1st overall pick
- Drafted by: San Francisco Warriors
- Playing career: 1965–1971
- Position: Power forward / center
- Number: 44, 21, 20, 30

Career history
- 1965–1968: San Francisco Warriors
- 1968–1969: Milwaukee Bucks
- 1969: Cincinnati Royals
- 1969–1970: Philadelphia 76ers
- 1970–1971: Los Angeles Lakers

Career highlights
- NBA All-Rookie First Team (1966); Consensus first-team All-American (1965); Consensus second-team All-American (1964); 3× SoCon Player of the Year (1963–1965); 2× SoCon Tournament MVP (1964, 1965); Fourth-team Parade All-American (1961)

Career NBA statistics
- Points: 4,658 (11.2 ppg)
- Rebounds: 2,444 (5.9 rpg)
- Assists: 462 (1.1 apg)
- Stats at NBA.com
- Stats at Basketball Reference

Fred B. Hetzel (born July 21, 1942) is an American former professional basketball player. He was an All-American college player for Davidson College. Hetzel was the No. 1 overall pick in the 1965 NBA draft by the San Francisco Warriors and played six seasons in the National Basketball Association (NBA).

== High school career ==
Hetzel initially attended Woodrow Wilson High School in Washington, D.C., and played for the Tigers in the 1958 season. He then transferred to Landon School in Bethesda, Maryland and was a 3 time All Met. As a sophomore, he averaged 20.5 ppg and 20.4 rebounds per game as a junior. As a 3 time All Met in the Washington Daily News, Washington Post, and Evening Star, he followed in the footsteps of Lew Luce and George Leftwich as the only 3-peats. He averaged 24.1 ppg in his senior season and finished with 1,210 points during his Bears career. On March 2, 1961, Undefeated Landon and DeMatha Catholic High School (ranked 1–2 in the city) faced off in Cole Field House before a crowd of 6400. Fred Hetzel led Landon that night with 18 points but it was the tandem of John Austin and Gary Ward that led the Stags to victory 57–52.

== College career ==
Hetzel played collegiately at Davidson College of the Southern Conference, recruited by Hall of Fame Coach Lefty Driesell. He was the Southern Conference Player of the Year in all three seasons for the Wildcats. Freshmen did not play varsity level, by NCAA rule in Hetzel's era. Davidson lost in the Southern Conference tournament in all three seasons of Hetzel's career, negating NCAA Tournament trips.

In 1962–1963, Hetzel averaged 23.7 points and 13.5 rebounds as Davidson finished 20–7. Davidson finished 18th in the AP/UPI polls

Davidson was 22–4 in 1963–1964, led by Hetzel's 27.3 points and 13.5 rebounds, winning the Southern Conference. Davidson finished 10th in the AP/UPI polls

As a senior, Davidson was 24–2, a perfect 12–0 in the Southern Conference in 1964–1965. behind Hetzel's 26.5 points and 14.8 rebound averages. Hetzel was a consensus All-American in 1965, along with Bill Bradley of Princeton, Cazzie Russell of Michigan, Gail Goodrich of UCLA and Rick Barry of Miami (FL). Sports Illustrated projected Davidson as the number one preseason basketball team in the US followed by Michigan.. Davidson ended the year at 6th in the AP/UPI polls.

Overall, Hetzel averaged 25.7 [2032] points and 13.8 rebounds in 79 games at Davidson, leading them to a 66–13 record over three seasons.

Before Hetzel embarked on his NBA career, he played for Team USA along with Bill Bradley in the 1965 Fifth World University Games in Budapest, Hungary. He helped the United States to a gold medal that he displayed in his living room. He averaged 12.9 points in the eight games.

== Professional career ==
A 6 feet 8 inches (2.03 m) forward-center from Davidson, Hetzel was selected by the San Francisco Warriors with the first overall pick of the 1965 NBA draft on May 6, 1965.

As a rookie, Hetzel was named to the 1966 NBA All-Rookie Team, along with Rick Barry, Billy Cunningham, Dick Van Arsdale and Tom Van Arsdale. Hetzel averaged 6. 8 points and 5.2 rebounds for Coach Alex Hannum and the Warriors, with Hall of Famers Rick Barry, Guy Rodgers and Nate Thurmond.

In 1966–1967, the Warriors improved to 44–37 under Coach Bill Sharman and advanced to the 1967 NBA Finals, where they lost to Wilt Chamberlain and the Philadelphia 76ers 4–2. Hetzel averaged 9.3 points and 4.0 rebounds in the series as the Warriors' 6th man. During the regular season, Hetzel was the team's 4th leading scorer with 12.2 points per game, along with 8.3 rebounds.

In 1967–1968, Hetzel had his finest professional season, averaging 19.0 points and 7.1 rebounds for the Warriors. The team finished 49–39, and defeated the St. Louis Hawks in the playoffs, before being swept by the Los Angeles Lakers in the Western Division Finals.

On May 6, 1968, Hetzel's Warrior career ended. He was chosen by the new Milwaukee Bucks from the San Francisco Warriors in the NBA expansion draft. During the 1968–1969 season, after 53 games with the Bucks, with Hetzel averaging 15.9 points and 8.9 rebounds, he was traded. On January 31, 1969, he was traded by the Bucks to the Cincinnati Royals for Donald Smith and cash. He finished the year with averages of 14.4 points and 7.3 rebounds.

Just before the start of the 1969–1970 season, on October 4, 1969, Hetzel was traded by the Cincinnati Royals to the Philadelphia 76ers for Craig Raymond and a future draft pick. Playing for Coach Jack Ramsay, Hetzel averaged 6.1 points and 3.3 rebounds in a reserve role for the 76ers.

On May 11, 1970, Hetzel was again claimed by a new team, when he was drafted by the new Portland Trail Blazers from the Philadelphia 76ers in the NBA expansion draft. Later, on August 28, 1970, he was claimed on waivers by the Los Angeles Lakers from the Trail Blazers.

Hetzel played 1970–1971 with the Lakers in his final season. He averaged 4.8 points and 2.9 rebounds in 59 games, playing a reserve role on a team with Hall of Famers Elgin Baylor, Wilt Chamberlain, Jerry West, Gail Goodrich and Pat Riley. The Lakers finished 48–34, losing to Lew Alcindor and the Milwaukee Bucks in the Western Division Finals.

Overall, Hetzel played six seasons in the NBA (1965–1971), averaging 11.2 points and 5.9 rebounds in 416 games.

== NBA career statistics ==
Legend
GP	Games played	GS	Games started	MPG	Minutes per game
FG%	Field goal percentage	3P%	3-point field goal percentage	FT%	Free throw percentage
RPG	Rebounds per game	APG	Assists per game	SPG	Steals per game
BPG	Blocks per game	PPG	Points per game	**Bold**	Career high

=== Regular season ===
Year	Team	GP	GS	MPG	FG%	3P%	FT%	RPG	APG	SPG	BPG	PPG
1965–66	San Francisco	56	–	12.9	.399	–	.685	5.2	0.5	–	–	6.8
1966–67	San Francisco	**77**	–	27.6	.400	–	.810	8.3	1.4	–	–	12.2
1967–68	San Francisco	**77**	–	**31.1**	.414	–	.833	7.1	**1.7**	–	–	**19.0**
1968–69	Milwaukee	53	–	30.0	.416	–	.837	**8.9**	1.6	–	–	15.9
1968–69	Cincinnati	31	–	22.1	**.488**	–	**.838**	4.5	0.9	–	–	11.9
1969–70	Philadelphia	63	–	12.0	.483	–	.835	3.3	0.7	–	–	6.1
1970–71	Los Angeles	59	–	10.4	.434	–	.779	2.5	0.6	–	–	4.8
Career		416	–	21.4	.421	–	.817	5.9	1.1	–	–	11.2

=== Playoffs ===
Year	Team	GP	GS	MPG	FG%	3P%	FT%	RPG	APG	SPG	BPG	PPG
1966–67	San Francisco	**13**	–	23.7	.383	–	.786	**7.2**	**1.8**	–	–	9.5
1967–68	San Francisco	10	–	**32.1**	.460	–	.820	6.6	1.6	–	–	**18.8**
1969–70	Philadelphia	5	–	15.0	**.520**	–	.818	3.6	0.6	–	–	7.0
1970–71	Los Angeles	7	–	5.4	.333	–	**1.000**	1.0	0.3	–	–	1.7
Career		35	–	21.2	.427	–	.814	5.3	1.3	–	–	10.3

== Personal life ==
Hetzel resides in Virginia and Florida. Starting in 1980 he owned and operated Fred Hetzel & Associates, a real estate and development company in Leesburg, Virginia. In 1985 he was elected the President of the Virginia Association of Realtors.

Reflecting on his career, Hetzel said “I was injured and had some problems that impacted my pro career,” he said.“However, I am happy to have had the experience of the NBA, to meet such great personalities and to have relationships with such great people is very special."

Hetzel's brother Will Hetzel played at Maryland from 1967 to 1970, averaging 18.0 points and 9.1 rebounds in his career. Will Hetzel played for Coach Lefty Drisell in his senior year at Maryland.

Hetzel's father, Fred Sr, played basketball at Maryland from 1928 to 1930.

== Honors ==
- In 1985, Hetzel was inducted into the Washington D.C. Metropolitan Basketball Hall of Fame.
- 1990 Recipient of the NABC Balfour Silver Anniversary Award
- Inducted into the Davidson Hall of Fame in 1990.
- 1996 SoCon 75th All Time All Star Team [Jerry West, Hot Rod Hundley, Fred Hetzel, Dick Groat, Frank Selvy]
- In 2010, Hetzel was inducted into the Southern Conference Hall of Fame.

== See also ==
- List of NCAA Division I men's basketball players with 2,000 points and 1,000 rebounds
