= Rod Knowles =

American basketball player

Personal information
- Born: February 27, 1946
- Died: October 25, 2008 (aged 62)
- Listed height: 6 ft 9 in (2.06 m)
- Listed weight: 215 lb (98 kg)

Career information
- High school: Rose (Greenville, North Carolina)
- College: Davidson (1965–1968)
- NBA draft: 1968: 6th round, 77th overall pick
- Drafted by: Phoenix Suns
- Position: Center
- Number: 23, 42

Career history
- 1968: Phoenix Suns
- 1968: New York Nets
- Stats at NBA.com
- Stats at Basketball Reference

William Rodney Knowles (February 27, 1946 – October 25, 2008) was a professional basketball player who played for the Phoenix Suns and New York Nets.

== College ==
Knowles helped lead the Davidson Wildcats to two NCAA tournament appearances in 1966 and 1968. He averaged 16.0 points per game, 10th all-time for the Wildcats. His 807 rebounds ranks 5th all-time.

== Career statistics ==
Legend
GP	Games played	GS	Games started	MPG	Minutes per game
FG%	Field goal percentage	3P%	3-point field goal percentage	FT%	Free throw percentage
RPG	Rebounds per game	APG	Assists per game	SPG	Steals per game
BPG	Blocks per game	PPG	Points per game	**Bold**	Career high

=== NBA/ABA ===
==== Regular season ====
Year	Team	GP	MPG	FG%	3P%	FT%	RPG	APG	PPG
1968–69	Phoenix (NBA)	**8**	**5.0**	**.286**	–	**.333**	**1.1**	.0	**1.1**
1968–69	N.Y. Nets (ABA)	1	3.0	–	'–	–	.0	.0	.0
Career		9	4.6	.286	–	.333	1.0	.0	1.0
