= Jason Richards (basketball) =

American basketball player (born 1986)

Pittsburgh Panthers
- Title: Director of student-athlete development

Personal information
- Born: May 20, 1986 (age 40)
- Listed height: 6 ft 2 in (1.88 m)
- Listed weight: 190 lb (86 kg)

Career information
- High school: Barrington (Barrington, Illinois)
- College: Davidson (2004–2008)
- NBA draft: 2008: undrafted
- Playing career: 2009–2010
- Position: Point guard

Career history
- 2009–2010: Utah Flash

Career highlights
- NCAA assists leader (2008); First team All-SoCon – Media (2008); 2× First team All-SoCon – Coaches (2007, 2008)

Jason Richards (born May 20, 1986) is an American former professional basketball player.

== High school ==
Richards attended Barrington High School in Barrington, Illinois.

== College career ==
Richards played college basketball for Davidson along with future NBA MVP Stephen Curry. As a senior, he led the NCAA Division I in assists, averaging 8.14 per game. Along with Curry, he helped guide the Wildcats to an NCAA Elite Eight appearance in 2008. He concluded his career as Davidson's career assists leader (663) and holds school records for assists in a season (293) and assists in a game (19).

== Professional career ==
After going undrafted in the 2008 NBA draft, Richards signed with the Miami Heat in the Orlando Summer League. He last played for the Utah Flash of the NBA Development League.

Richards was forced to retire after enduring multiple ACL injuries throughout his career. He officially ended his career on January 19, 2010.

== After basketball ==
He served as the video coordinator and director of analytics for the Pittsburgh Panthers from 2013 to 2017. In 2017–2018, he served as the Panthers Director of Basketball Operations and in April 2018, Richards was hired as the Panthers director of student-athlete development.

== Personal life ==
Richards is the son of Tom Richards, who played basketball with the Pittsburgh Panthers men's basketball team in the 1970s and later became the chairman and CEO of the CDW corporation. His sister, Lindsay, played basketball for Barrington High School and was a McDonald's All-American in 2002.
