= Bob McKillop =

American basketball coach

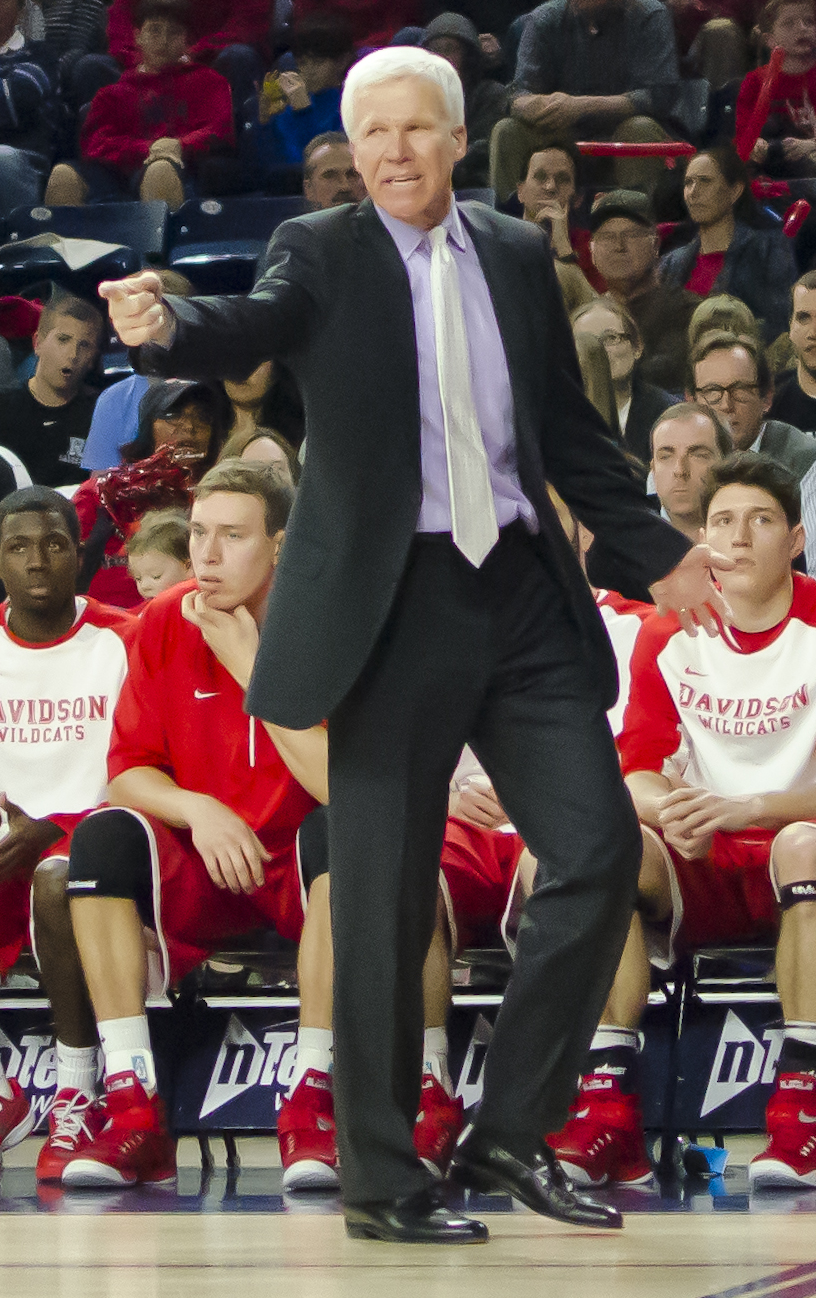

Biographical details
- Born: July 13, 1950 (age 76); Queens, New York, U.S.

Playing career
- 1967–1968: East Carolina
- 1970–1972: Hofstra

Coaching career (HC unless noted)
- 1973–1978: Holy Trinity HS (NY)
- 1978–1979: Davidson (assistant)
- 1979–1989: Long Island Lutheran HS (NY)
- 1989–2022: Davidson

Head coaching record
- Overall: 634–380 (.625)
- Tournaments: 3–10 (NCAA Division I); 2–8 (NIT); 2–1 (CBI)

Accomplishments and honors

Championships
- 11× SoCon regular season (1996, 1998, 2001, 2002, 2005, 2007–2009, 2012–2014); 7× SoCon tournament (1998, 2002, 2006–2008, 2012, 2013); 13× SoCon division (1996–1998, 2001–2005, 2007–2009, 2012, 2013); 2× A-10 regular season (2015, 2022); A-10 tournament (2018)

Awards
- Clair Bee Coach of the Year Award (2008); NABC Coach of the Year (2008); 8× SoCon Coach of the Year (1994, 1996, 1997, 2002, 2005, 2007, 2012, 2013); 2× A-10 Coach of the Year (2015, 2022), North Carolina Athletics Hall of Fame (2024), NABC International Committee Lifetime Achievement Award, Southern Conference Hall of Fame (2026), Davidson College Hall of Fame (2026)

Robert McKillop (born July 13, 1950) is an American college basketball coach who is the former head coach of the Davidson Wildcats men's team of the Atlantic 10 Conference. He had a 100 percent graduation rate for his players during a 33-year tenure.

== Early basketball career ==
Born in Queens, New York, McKillop grew up in Queens and on Long Island and played for Chaminade High School in Mineola. McKillop went on to play college ball for East Carolina University before transferring to Hofstra University. At Hofstra he was named team MVP. After graduating in 1972 with a degree in history, he was briefly signed as a free agent by the Philadelphia 76ers, but was cut.

== Coaching career ==
He then accepted a job teaching history and coaching basketball back on Long Island at Holy Trinity Diocesan High School in Hicksville. There, McKillop achieved an 86–25 record. In 1978 he became an assistant coach at Davidson College in North Carolina for one year before returning to high school ball at Long Island Lutheran Middle and High School in Brookville. There, McKillop compiled a record of 182–51, winning five New York State Championships.

== Head coach at Davidson ==
In 1989, McKillop returned to Davidson as head coach. He is Davidson's all-time leader in wins, years coached, and games coached. His 230 Southern Conference wins are more than any coach in league history. He has been the SoCon Coach of the Year seven times, has won thirteen conference division titles, seven tournament championships, and taken his team to seven NCAA tournaments and four postseason NITs. All this winning hasn't come at any academic sacrifice, as 95 per cent of his Davidson lettermen have graduated. In 2006 the Wildcats won the Southern Conference tournament and went on to face No. 4 seeded Ohio State in the NCAA tournament. 13th seeded Davidson led 29–25 at halftime before falling 70–62. On January 27, 2007, McKillop reached 300 wins with a 79–59 victory over Western Carolina in Belk Arena. On February 26, 2011 he reached 400 wins with a 78–67 victory over UNC Greensboro.

Despite the recent success of the Wildcats, the 2006–07 season promised to be a rebuilding year, as McKillop lost seven seniors, accounting for 76% of scoring. Nevertheless, Davidson finished the year with an overall record of 24–4 and 17–1 in the SoCon. They were ranked 31st in the nation by the ESPN/USA Today poll and #4 among mid-majors. In the months of December, January and February, the Wildcats lost a total of one game. This season saw the arrival of the Wildcats' greatest modern player, future two-time NBA MVP Stephen Curry.

On March 3, 2007, the Wildcats won their second straight Southern Conference tournament Championship, and third in 5 years. Davidson defeated College of Charleston 72–65, after waltzing past Furman and UT Chattanooga in the earlier rounds. In 2007, McKillop's Wildcats represented the Southern Conference in the NCAA tournament by battling number 4 seed Maryland losing by 12 at Buffalo.

In 2008, after compiling a perfect regular season conference record, the Wildcats ran their record to three straight Southern Conference tournament Championships, beating Elon in the title game. They entered the NCAA tournament as a 10-seed and took down 7-seed Gonzaga, for their first NCAA Tournament win since 1969. They then won their second-round game against the 2-seed Georgetown to advance to the Sweet 16. Almost a week after beating Georgetown, McKillop and Davidson stunned by upsetting the 3 seed and regular season Big Ten champions Wisconsin. This win put Davidson in the Elite Eight for the first time since Lefty Driesell got them there in 1969.

The 2008 season was a testament to McKillop's recruiting prowess, as they were carried by the shooting of Curry, who did not get a second look from most of the bigger programs.

In February 2014, Davidson named the playing surface at Davidson's on-campus arena, John M. Belk Arena, "McKillop Court"—much to McKillop's surprise.

== Family ==
McKillop and his wife, Cathy, have three children, all of whom graduated from Davidson—Kerrin in 2002, Matt in 2006, and Brendan in 2011. Matt played for his father from 2003 to 2006 and earned four varsity letters. After assisting former Wildcat player and assistant coach Jason Zimmerman at Emory University in Atlanta, Matt was named assistant coach to his father at Davidson in 2008, was elevated to associate head coach in 2016, and succeeded his father as Wildcats head coach in 2022. Brendan also played for his father at Davidson.

All of McKillop's children married Davidson students; Kerrin married former Wildcats baseball player Henry Heil, Matt married former Wildcats tennis player Kelsey Linville, and Brenden married Keena Classen. McKillop has seven grandchildren: Kerrin's children Maggie, Claire, and Jack Heil; Matt's children Hazel, Rosie, and Charlie McKillop; and Brenden’s daughter Elsie McKillop.

== Head coaching record ==
=== College ===
Record table
Season	Team	Overall	Conference	Standing	Postseason
Davidson Wildcats (NCAA Division I independent) (1989–1990)
1989–90	Davidson	4–24			
Davidson Wildcats (Big South Conference) (1990–1992)
1990–91	Davidson	10–19	6–8	4th	
1991–92	Davidson	11–17	6–8	6th	
Davidson Wildcats (Southern Conference) (1992–2014)
1992–93	Davidson	14–14	10–8	5th	
1993–94	Davidson	22–8	13–5	T–2nd	NIT First Round
1994–95	Davidson	14–13	7–7	3rd (North)	
1995–96	Davidson	25–5	14–0	1st (North)	NIT First Round
1996–97	Davidson	18–10	10–4	T–1st (North)	
1997–98	Davidson	20–10	13–2	T–1st (North)	NCAA Division I Round of 64
1998–99	Davidson	16–11	11–5	2nd (North)	
1999–00	Davidson	15–13	10–6	2nd (North)	
2000–01	Davidson	15–17	7–9	T–3rd (North)	
2001–02	Davidson	21–10	11–5	T–1st (North)	NCAA Division I Round of 64
2002–03	Davidson	17–10	11–5	T–1st (North)	
2003–04	Davidson	17–12	11–5	T–1st (South)	
2004–05	Davidson	23–9	16–0	1st (South)	NIT Second Round
2005–06	Davidson	20–11	10–5	2nd (South)	NCAA Division I Round of 64
2006–07	Davidson	29–5	17–1	1st (South)	NCAA Division I Round of 64
2007–08	Davidson	29–7	20–0	1st (South)	NCAA Division I Elite Eight
2008–09	Davidson	27–8	18–2	1st (South)	NIT Second Round
2009–10	Davidson	16–15	11–7	3rd (South)	
2010–11	Davidson	18–15	10–8	4th (South)	CBI Quarterfinal
2011–12	Davidson	25–8	16–2	1st (South)	NCAA Division I Round of 64
2012–13	Davidson	26–8	17–1	1st (South)	NCAA Division I Round of 64
2013–14	Davidson	20–13	15–1	1st	NIT First Round
Davidson Wildcats (Atlantic 10 Conference) (2014–2022)
2014–15	Davidson	24–8	14–4	1st	NCAA Division I Round of 64
2015–16	Davidson	20–13	10–8	6th	NIT First Round
2016–17	Davidson	17–15	8–10	9th	
2017–18	Davidson	21–12	13–5	3rd	NCAA Division I Round of 64
2018–19	Davidson	24–10	14–4	2nd	NIT First Round
2019–20	Davidson	16–14	10–8	7th	
2020–21	Davidson	13–9	7–4	3rd	NIT First Round
2021–22	Davidson	27–7	15–3	1st	NCAA Division I Round of 64
Davidson:		634–380 (.625)	381–149 (.719)		
Total:		634–380 (.625)			
National champion Postseason invitational champion Conference regular season champion Conference regular season and conference tournament champion Division regular season champion Division regular season and conference tournament champion Conference tournament champion
