= Mike Maloy =

American-Austrian basketball player

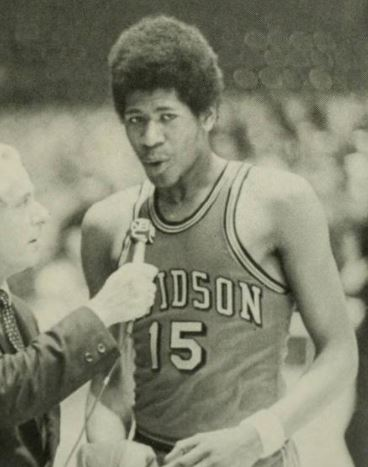
- Maloy as a junior at Davidson

Personal information
- Born: May 10, 1949 New York City, New York, U.S.
- Died: February 3, 2009 (aged 59) Vienna, Austria
- Listed height: 6 ft 7 in (2.01 m)
- Listed weight: 215 lb (98 kg)

Career information
- High school: William Cullen Bryant (Long Island City, New York)
- College: Davidson (1967–1970)
- NBA draft: 1970: 10th round, 157th overall pick
- Drafted by: Boston Celtics
- Playing career: 1970–1994
- Position: Power forward / center
- Number: 34, 54

Career history
- 1970–1972: Virginia Squires
- 1972–1973: Dallas Chaparrals
- 1975–1980: UBSC Vienna
- Mattersburg
- Klostennurburg
- Gra ABC
- Munich-Graz

Career highlights
- As player: 4× Austrian League champion (1976, 1977, 1979, 1980); Consensus second-team All-American (1969); Third-team All-American – AP, NABC (1970); 2× SoCon Player of the Year (1969, 1970)
- Stats at Basketball Reference

Michael Alvin Maloy (May 10, 1949 – February 3, 2009) was an American-Austrian professional basketball player who played in the ABA and in Austria in the OBB. He was an All-American college basketball player for the Davidson Wildcats.

== College career ==
Maloy attended Davidson College – though he never graduated – and was the first black player to play for the Davidson Wildcats men's basketball team, where he was a three-time All-American and Southern Conference Player of the Year in 1969 and 1970. Maloy is the school's all-time leading rebounder, with a total of 1111.

Maloy also became the first African American to join a college fraternity at Davidson, when he was accepted into the school's Sigma Chi chapter in 1967.

== Professional career ==
Upon becoming a professional, Maloy was drafted by the Boston Celtics of the NBA, but he rejected the NBA draft and played three seasons in the ABA instead, with the Virginia Squires and the Dallas Chaparrals. He later played professionally with UBSC Vienna in the Austrian League.

== National team career ==
After he became a naturalized citizen of Austria in 1980, Maloy was a member of the senior Austrian national team.

== After basketball ==
Upon ending his pro basketball club playing career in Austria, Maloy coached Austrian youth teams. He also taught history at the American International School Vienna, where he coached a team as well.

== Personal life ==
Maloy had two children with his wife, Leslie Clarke. He left his family behind when he moved to Austria and only saw them again once. Maloy established a new life for himself and later had a third child.

When he was not coaching or teaching, Maloy was a member of the Boring Blues Band, which performed regularly throughout Vienna. Maloy died at the age of 59 on February 3, 2009, in Vienna following a severe case of the flu.
