= Jim Fox (basketball, born 1973) =

American basketball coach

Biographical details
- Born: October 2, 1973 (age 53); Levittown, New York, U.S.
- Education: SUNY Geneseo

Coaching career (HC unless noted)
- 1996–2001: St. Dominic HS (assoc. HC)
- 2001–2012: Davidson (asst.)
- 2012–2014: Davidson (assoc. HC)
- 2014–2019: Appalachian State

Head coaching record
- Overall: 56–99 (.361)

Jim Fox (born October 2, 1973) is an American college men's basketball coach who is the former head coach for Appalachian State University. He was also a longtime assistant coach at Davidson College.

== Head coaching record ==
Record table
Season	Team	Overall	Conference	Standing	Postseason
Appalachian State Mountaineers (Sun Belt Conference) (2014–2019)
2014–15	Appalachian State	12–17	9–11	T–6th	
2015–16	Appalachian State	9–22	7–13	T–9th	
2016–17	Appalachian State	9–21	4–14	11th	
2017–18	Appalachian State	15–18	9–9	T–5th	
2018–19	Appalachian State	11–21	6–12	10th	
Appalachian State:		56–99 (.361)	35–59 (.372)		
Total:		56–99 (.361)			
National champion Postseason invitational champion Conference regular season champion Conference regular season and conference tournament champion Division regular season champion Division regular season and conference tournament champion Conference tournament champion
