= Appalachian State Mountaineers men's basketball =

2026–27 Appalachian State Mountaineers men's basketball team
- University: Appalachian State University
- Head coach: Dustin Kerns (7th season)
- Location: Boone, North Carolina
- Arena: Holmes Center (capacity: 8,325)
- Conference: Sun Belt Conference
- Nickname: Mountaineers
- Colors: Black and gold

NCAA Division I tournament round of 32
- 1979

NCAA Division I tournament appearances
- 1979, 2000, 2021

Conference tournament champions
- 1979, 2000, 2021

Conference regular-season champions
- 1940, 1941, 1943, 1948, 1950, 1967, 1978, 1979, 1981, 1998, 2000, 2003, 2024

Conference division champions
- 1998, 1999, 2000, 2003, 2007, 2008, 2010

Uniforms
Home	Away

The Appalachian State Mountaineers men's basketball team is the college basketball team at Appalachian State University in Boone, North Carolina, United States. The Mountaineers compete in the Sun Belt Conference after having competed in the Southern Conference from 1972 to 2014. They are currently a Division I member of the National Collegiate Athletic Association (NCAA). Appalachian State plays their home games at the Holmes Center.

Notable past coaches include Buzz Peterson, Press Maravich, and Bobby Cremins. The Mountaineers have appeared in the NCAA tournament three times, 1979, 2000, and 2021. They also appeared in the National Invitation Tournament in 2007 and 2024. The Mountaineers also reached the semifinals of the 2010 CollegeInsider.com Postseason Tournament.

== Conference championships ==
=== Regular season ===
Year	Conference	Record	Coach
1939–1940	North State	19–3	Flucie Stewart
1940–1941	North State	22–3	Clyde Canipe
1942–1943	North State	16–5	Belus Smawley
1947–1948	North State	20–8	Francis Hoover
1949–1950	North State	21–9	Francis Hoover
1966–1967	Carolinas	21–8	Bob Light
1977–1978	Southern	9–3	Bobby Cremins
1978–1979^	Southern	11–3	Bobby Cremins
1980–1981♦	Southern	11–5	Bobby Cremins
1997–1998♦*	Southern	13–2 (North)	Buzz Peterson
1998–1999	Southern	13–3 (North)	Buzz Peterson
1999–2000^	Southern	13–3 (North)	Buzz Peterson
2002–2003♦	Southern	11–5 (North)	Houston Fancher
2006–2007	Southern	15–3 (North)	Houston Fancher
2007–2008♦	Southern	13–7 (North)	Houston Fancher
2009–2010	Southern	13–5 (North)	Buzz Peterson
2010-2011	Southern	10–8 (North)	Jason Capel
2011-2012	Southern	7-11 (North)	Jason Capel
2012-2013	Southern	10-8 (North)	Jason Capel
2013-2014	Southern	5-11	Jason Capel
2014-2015	Sun Belt	9-11	Jim Fox
2015-2016	Sun Belt	7-13	Jim Fox
2016-2017	Sun Belt	4-14	Jim Fox
2017-2018	Sun Belt	9-9	Jim Fox
2018-19	Sun Belt	6-12	Jim Fox
2019-2020	Sun Belt	11-9	Dustin Kerns
2020-2021^	Sun Belt	7-8	Dustin Kerns
2021-2022	Sun Belt	12-6	Dustin Kerns
2022-2023	Sun Belt	9-9	Dustin Kerns
2023-2024	Sun Belt	16-2	Dustin Kerns
Total		16	
♦ Denotes first place and/or conference regular season champion
^ denotes conference tournament champion, and NCAA Tournament Bid
* The Southern Conference split into North and South divisions beginning with the 1994–95 season

=== Conference Tournament Champions ===
Year	Conference	Record	Coach
1978–1979	Southern	11-3	Bobby Cremins
1999–2000	Southern	13-3	Buzz Peterson
2020–2021	Sun Belt	7-8	Dustin Kerns
Total		3	

== Postseason results ==
=== NCAA tournament results ===
The Mountaineers have appeared in the NCAA tournament three times. Their combined record is 0–3.

Year	Seed	Round	Opponent	Result
1979	#6	Second Round	#3 LSU	L 57–71
2000	#14	First Round	#3 Ohio State	L 61–87
2021	#16	First Four	#16 Norfolk State	L 53–54

=== National Invitation Tournament results ===
The Mountaineers have appeared in the National Invitation Tournament two times. Their record is 0–2.

Year	Round	Opponent	Result
2007	First Round	Mississippi	L 59–73
2024	First Round	Wake Forest	L 76–87

=== CollegeInsider.com results ===
The Mountaineers have appeared in the CollegeInsider.com Postseason Tournament one time. Their record is 2–1.

Year	Round	Opponent	Result
2010	First Round; Quarterfinals; Semifinals	Harvard; Marshall; Pacific	W 93–71; W 80–72; L 56–64

=== The Basketball Classic results ===
The Mountaineers have appeared in The Basketball Classic one time. Their record is 0–1.

Year	Round	Opponent	Result
2022	First Round	USC Upstate	L 74–80

=== NAIA tournament results ===
The Mountaineers have appeared in the NAIA Tournament five times. Their combined record is 5–5.

Year	Round	Opponent	Result
1940	First Round; Second Round	Bemidji State; San Diego State	W 43–34; L 46–68
1941	First Round; Second Round; Quarterfinals	Baker; Baltimore; Santa Barbara State	W 63–42; W 48–36; L 29–36
1943	First Round; Second Round; Quarterfinals	Simpson (IA); Kansas Wesleyan; Northwest Missouri State	W 48–31; W 54–40; L 34–46
1948	First Round	Lawrence Tech	L 48–76
1950	First Round	Brooklyn	L 75–79

== Coaching history ==
Coach	Years	Seasons	Record	Pct.	Conf. Record	Pct.	Conf. Titles	NIT App.	NCAA App.
No Coach	1919–20/1925–34	9	86–33	.723					
Eugene Garbee	1934–35	1	8–11	.421					
Flucie Stewart	1935–40/1946–47	6	67–38	.638	48–24	.667	1		
Clyde Canipe	1940–42	2	38–7	.844	22–5	.815	1		
Belus Smawley	1942–43	1	16–5	.762	9–0	1.000	1		
Harold Quincy	1943–44	1	0–7	.000					
G. P. Eggers	1944–45	1	6–13	.316	7–5	.583			
Francis Hoover	1945–46/1947–57	11	133–127	.512	91–87	.511	2		
Bob Light	1957–72	15	212–178	.544	94–85	.525	1		
Press Maravich	1972–75	3	14–63	.182	5–30	.143			
Bobby Cremins	1975–81	6	100–70	.588	51–31	.622	3		1
Kevin Cantwell	1981–86	5	61–78	.439	33–47	.413			
Tom Apke	1986–96	10	139–147	.486	70–82	.461			
Buzz Peterson	1996–2000/2009–10	5	103–52	.665	60–17	.779	4		1
Houston Fancher	2000–09	9	137–136	.502	79–73	.520	3	1	
Jason Capel	2010–2014	4	53–70	.431	32–35	.478			
Jim Fox	2014–2019	5	56–99	.361	35–59	.372			
Dustin Kerns	2019–	7	114-79	.591	65-42	.607	2	1	1
Totals	1919–present	96	1229–1101	.527	635–562	.530	17	1	3

== Rivalries ==
Appalachian's primary basketball rivals are the East Tennessee State Buccaneers and the Georgia Southern Eagles. Appalachian State is only 55 miles from Johnson City, TN. East Tennessee State has dominated the series over the past two decades, winning 14 games and losing 3. After being highly competitive in Division I-AA Southern Conference from the late 1990s to the late 2000s, Appalachian State and Georgia Southern have rekindled a rivalry series in the Sun Belt conference. Since the transition in 2014, the Mountaineers are 6–7 against the Eagles, winning each of the last four meetings.

== Mountaineers in the NBA ==
Two former Appalachian State players has played in the NBA.

Name	Years Played	Teams
Belus Smawley	1947–1952	St. Louis Bombers, Syracuse Nationals, and Baltimore Bullets
C. J. Huntley	2025–2026	Phoenix Suns

=== NBA draft ===
Five former Appalachian State players have been drafted into the NBA.

Year	Round	Pick	Player
1950	8	91	Charles Hope
1978	8	163	Tony Searcy
1979	4	78	Darryl Robinson
1979	8	158	Renaldo Lawrence
1984	8	181	Dale Roberts
