= Davidson Wildcats men's basketball =

Men's basketball team that represents Davidson College

2026–27 Davidson Wildcats men's basketball team
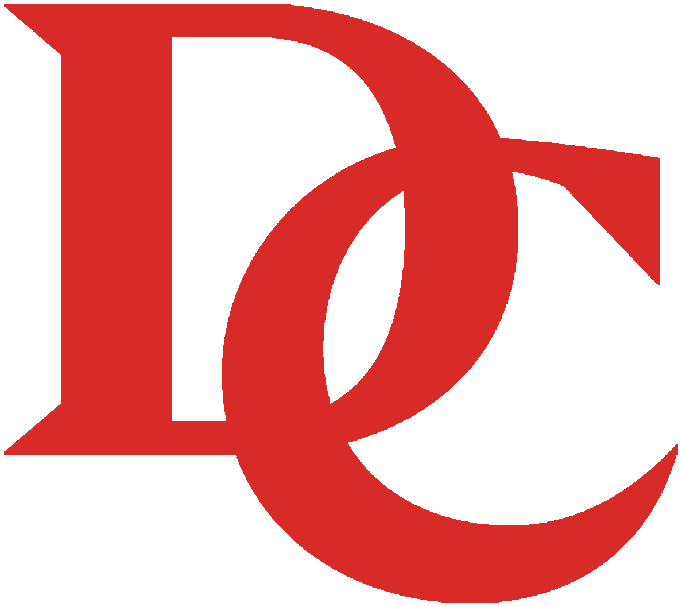
- University: Davidson College
- Head coach: Matt McKillop (5th season)
- Location: Davidson, North Carolina
- Arena: John M. Belk Arena (capacity: 5,223)
- Conference: Atlantic 10
- Nickname: Wildcats
- Colors: Red and black
- Student section: D-Block

NCAA Division I tournament Elite Eight
- 1968, 1969, 2008
Other NCAA Division I tournament results
Sweet Sixteen	1966, 1968, 1969, 2008
Appearances	1966, 1968, 1969, 1970, 1986, 1998, 2002, 2006, 2007, 2008, 2012, 2013, 2015, 2018, 2022

Conference tournament champions
- SoCon: 1966, 1968, 1969, 1970, 1986, 1998, 2002, 2006, 2007, 2008, 2012, 2013 Atlantic 10: 2018

Conference regular-season champions
- SoCon: 1964, 1965, 1966, 1968, 1969, 1970, 1971, 1972, 1973, 1981, 1996, 1997, 1998, 2002, 2003, 2004, 2005, 2007, 2008, 2009, 2012, 2013, 2014 Atlantic 10: 2015, 2022

Uniforms
Home	Away

The Davidson Wildcats basketball team is the basketball team that represents Davidson College in Davidson, North Carolina, in the NCAA. The school's team currently competes in the Atlantic 10 Conference. The team last played in the NCAA Division I men's basketball tournament in 2022. The Wildcats are currently coached by Matt McKillop, in his third season after succeeding his father Bob after the 2021–22 season. Davidson plays its home games at the Belk Arena in Baker Sports Complex on the school's campus.

== Conference affiliations ==
- 1907–08 to 1935–36: Independent
- 1936–37 to 1987–88: Southern Conference
- 1988–89 to 1989–90: NCAA Division I independent
- 1990–91 to 1991–92: Big South Conference
- 1992–93 to 2013–14: Southern Conference
- 2014–15 to present: Atlantic 10 Conference

== Postseason ==
=== NCAA tournament results ===
The Wildcats have appeared in 15 NCAA Tournaments. Their combined record is 8–16.

Year	Round	Opponent	Result
1966	First Round; Sweet Sixteen; Regional third place Game	Rhode Island; Syracuse; Saint Joseph's	W 95–68; L 78–94; L 76–92
1968	First Round; Sweet Sixteen; Elite Eight	St. John's; Columbia; North Carolina	W 79–70; W 61–59^{OT} L 66–70
1969	First Round; Sweet Sixteen; Elite Eight	Villanova; St. John's; North Carolina	W 75–61; W 79–69; L 85–87
1970	First Round	St. Bonaventure	L 72–85
1986	First Round	Kentucky	L 55–75
1998	First Round	Michigan	L 61–80
2002	First Round	Ohio State	L 64–69
2006	First Round	Ohio State	L 62–70
2007	First Round	Maryland	L 70–82
2008	First Round; Second Round; Sweet Sixteen; Elite Eight	Gonzaga; Georgetown; Wisconsin; Kansas	W 82–76; W 74–70; W 73–56; L 57–59
2012	Second Round	Louisville	L 62–69
2013	Second Round	Marquette	L 58–59
2015	Second Round	Iowa	L 52–83
2018	First Round	Kentucky	L 73–78
2022	First Round	Michigan State	L 73–74

==== 2008 NCAA tournament ====
In 2008, Davidson defeated the Gonzaga Bulldogs, Georgetown Hoyas, and Wisconsin Badgers to advance to the Elite Eight. The Wildcats nearly made the Final Four, but lost to the eventual champion Kansas Jayhawks 59–57. Prior to their Sweet Sixteen matchup, the college's board of trustees supplied students with tickets, transportation and lodging for the Sweet Sixteen and Elite Eight games. Following the tournament, the Wildcats earned a number 9 ranking in the ESPN/USA Today poll. Stephen Curry, who has since become a two-time NBA MVP with the Golden State Warriors, was the leading scorer of this team.

=== NIT results ===
The Wildcats have appeared in ten National Invitation Tournaments. Their combined record is 3–10.

Year	Round	Opponent	Result
1972	First Round	Syracuse	L 77–81
1994	First Round	West Virginia	L 69–85
1996	First Round	South Carolina	L 73–100
2005	Opening Round; First Round; Second Round	VCU; SW Missouri State; Maryland	W 77–62; W 82–71; L 63–78
2009	First Round; Second Round	South Carolina; Saint Mary's	W 70–63; L 68–80
2014	First Round	Missouri	L 77–85
2016	First Round	Florida State	L 74–84
2019	First Round	Lipscomb	L 81–89
2021	First Round	NC State	L 61–75
2026	First Round	Oklahoma State	L 80–84

=== CBI results ===
The Wildcats have appeared in one College Basketball Invitational. Their record is 1–1.

Year	Round	Opponent	Result
2011	First Round; Quarterfinals	James Madison; Creighton	W 85–65; L 92–102

== ESPN basketball ranking ==
In a system ranked by ESPN, Davidson was listed as the #44 Basketball Program of the last 50 years (1962–2012) based on its on the court accomplishments during that period. (out of 309 Division I programs that qualified)

"Positives: Under Lefty Driesell, the Wildcats were a powerhouse in the 1960s, racking up seven 20-win seasons in an eight-year span. The ’64–65 team was AP preseason No. 4 and boasted future NBA No. 1 pick Fred Hetzel. Nine combined conference titles (Regular season & Conference Tournaments) since 2005."

== Players ==
=== Retired numbers ===
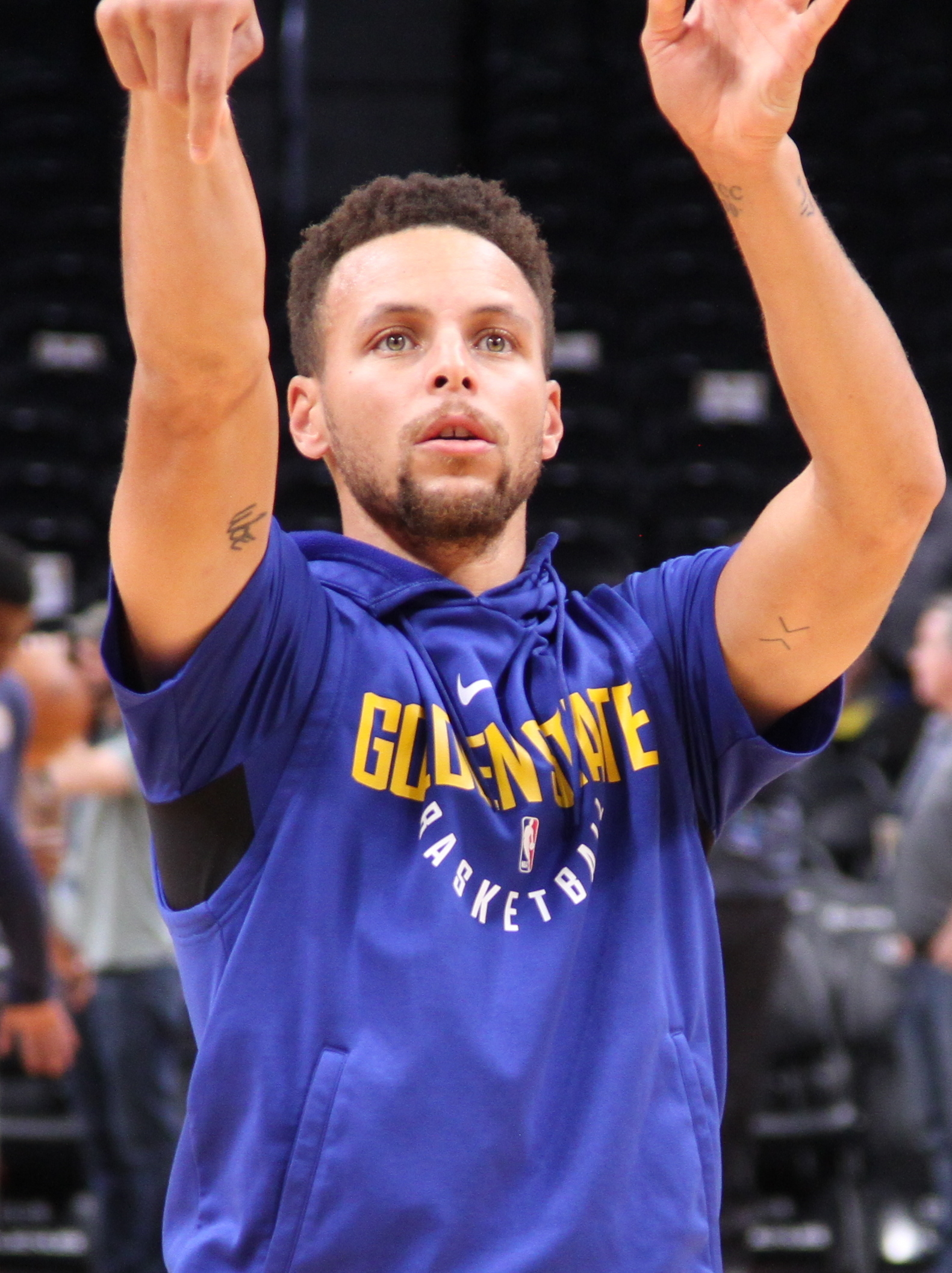
Stephen Curry became the first Wildcat to have his number retired in 2022.

Per athletic department policy, number and/or jersey retirement is reserved for players who have earned bachelor's degrees at Davidson. While six players have had jerseys retired, Stephen Curry is the first to have his number retired. Curry qualified after completing his bachelor's degree in May 2022. During the retirement ceremony held on August 31, 2022, Curry not only had his number retired, but also entered Davidson's athletic hall of fame and physically received his Davidson diploma.

Davidson Wildcats retired numbers
No.	Player	Pos.	Tenure	No. ret.	Ref.
30	Stephen Curry	PG	2006–2009	2022	

=== Retired jerseys ===
Honored, but numbers are still active:

No.	Player	Tenure
10	Dick Snyder	1963–1966
11	Derek Rucker	1984–1988
21	Hobby Cobb	1952–1956
33	John Gerdy	1975–1979
42	Terry Holland	1961–1964
42	Fred Hetzel	1962–1965

=== All-Americans ===
Player	Year(s)	Team(s)
Fred Hetzel	1964	Consensus Second Team – AP (2nd), NABC (2nd), UPI (3rd)
Fred Hetzel	1965	Consensus First Team – AP (1st), USBWA (1st), NABC (1st), UPI (1st)
Dick Snyder	1966	Consensus Second Team – AP (2nd), USBWA (1st), UPI (2nd)
Mike Maloy	1969	Consensus Second Team – AP (2nd), USBWA (1st), NABC (3rd), UPI (3rd)
Mike Maloy	1970	AP (3rd), NABC (3rd), UPI (3rd)
Stephen Curry	2008	Consensus Second Team – AP (2nd), Sporting News (2nd)
Stephen Curry	2009	Consensus First Team – AP (1st), USBWA (1st), NABC (1st), Sporting News (1st)

=== Wildcats in the NBA/ABA ===
Player	Years active	Teams	Highlights
Stephen Curry	2009–present	Golden State Warriors	4× NBA champion (2015, 2017, 2018, 2022); 2× NBA Most Valuable Player (2015, 2016); NBA Finals MVP (2022); 2× NBA All-Star Game MVP (2022, 2025); NBA Western Conference finals MVP (2022); NBA Clutch Player of the Year (2024); 11× NBA All-Star (2014–2019, 2021–2025); 11× All-NBA (first team: 2015, 2016, 2019, 2021; second team: 2014, 2017, 2022, 2023, 2025; third team: 2018, 2024); Olympic gold medalist (2024)
Fred Hetzel	1965–1971	San Francisco Warriors, Milwaukee Bucks, Cincinnati Royals, Philadelphia 76ers, Los Angeles Lakers	Top overall pick in the 1965 NBA draft
Rod Knowles	1968–1969	Phoenix Suns, New York Nets	
Mike Maloy	1970–1973	Virginia Squires, Dallas Chaparrals	
Dick Snyder	1966–1979	St. Louis Hawks, Phoenix Suns, Seattle SuperSonics, Cleveland Cavaliers	NBA champion (1979)
Brandon Williams	1997–2003	Golden State Warriors, San Antonio Spurs, Atlanta Hawks	

=== Wildcats playing in international leagues ===
- Tyler Kalinoski (born 1992), American player for Unicaja of Spanish Liga ACB
- Luka Brajkovic (born 1999), Austrian player for Rio Breogan of Liga ACB
- Jake Cohen (born 1990), American-Israeli player for Maccabi Tel Aviv and the Israeli national basketball team
- Jón Axel Guðmundsson (born 1996), Icelandic guard for Victoria Libertas Pesaro of the Italian Lega Basket Serie A
- Lee Hyun-jung (born 2000), South Korean player for Illawarra Hawks of the Australian NBL
- Sam Mennenga (born 2001), New Zealander player for New Zealand Breakers of the Australian NBL

=== Players in Davidson Athletics Hall of Fame ===
- John Belk ’43
- Hobby Cobb ‘56
- Stephen Curry (played 2006–2009; inducted in 2022)
- Fred Hetzel ’65
- Rodney Knowles ’68
- Jerry Kroll ‘70
- Doug Cook ‘70
- Mike Maloy (played 1965-1969; inducted 2020)
- Derek Rucker ’88
- Richard Snyder ’66
- John Gerdy ’79
- Brandon Williams '96
- Brendan Winters '06

=== Coaches in Davidson Athletics Hall of Fame ===
- Charles "Lefty" Driesell
