= 2008–09 San Diego State Aztecs men's basketball team =

American college basketball season

2008–09 San Diego State Aztecs men's basketball
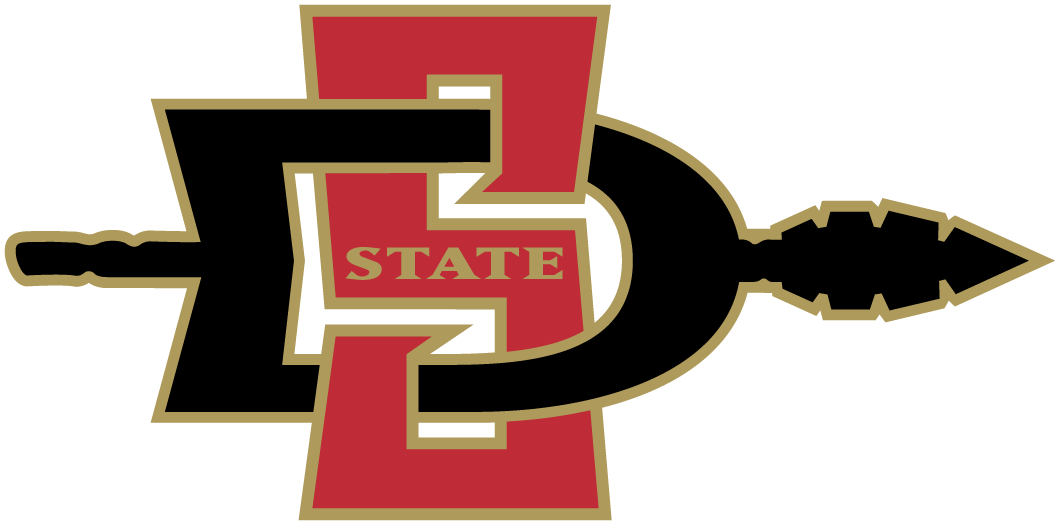

Great Alaska Shootout Champions

NIT, Semifinals
- Conference: Mountain West Conference
- Record: 26–10 (11–5 Mountain West)
- Head coach: Steve Fisher (10th season)
- Associate head coach: Brian Dutcher
- Assistant coach: Justin Hutson (3rd season)
- Home arena: Viejas Arena

2008–09 Mountain West Conference men's basketball standings
	Conf.				Overall
Team	W		L	PCT	W		L	PCT
BYU	12	–	4	.750	25	–	8	.758
No. 25 Utah †	12	–	4	.750	25	–	10	.714
New Mexico	12	–	4	.750	22	–	12	.647
San Diego State	11	–	5	.688	26	–	10	.722
UNLV	9	–	7	.563	21	–	11	.656
Wyoming	7	–	9	.438	19	–	14	.576
TCU	5	–	11	.313	14	–	17	.452
Colorado State	4	–	12	.250	9	–	22	.290
Air Force	0	–	16	.000	10	–	21	.323
† Mountain West tournament winner As of April 1, 2009; Rankings from AP Poll

The 2008–09 San Diego State men's basketball team represented San Diego State University in the 2008–09 college basketball season. This was head coach Steve Fisher's tenth season at San Diego State. The Aztecs competed in the Mountain West Conference and played their home games at Viejas Arena.

== Schedule and results ==
- All times are Pacific

Date time, TV	Rank^{#}	Opponent^{#}	Result	Record	Site (attendance) city, state
Exhibition
11/11/2008*; 7:00 pm		Point Loma Nazarene	W 92–63	–	Cox Arena; San Diego, CA
Regular Season
11/15/2008*; 1:00 pm		UC–San Diego	W 59–40	1–0	Cox Arena (4,674); San Diego, CA
11/18/2008*; 8:00 pm, CBSCS		No. 15 Arizona State	L 52–59	1–1	Cox Arena (7,966); San Diego, CA
11/22/2008*; 1:00 pm		Fresno State	W 80–56	2–1	Cox Arena (5,034); San Diego, CA
11/27/2008*; 8:30 pm		vs. Western Carolina; Great Alaska Shootout Quarterfinals	W 59–58	3–1	Sullivan Arena (5,051); Anchorage, AK
11/28/2008*; 9:00 pm		vs. Seattle; Great Alaska Shootout Semifinals	W 75–56	4–1	Sullivan Arena (5,719); Anchorage, AK
11/28/2008*; 9:00 pm		vs. Hampton; Great Alaska Shootout Championship Game	W 76–47	5–1	Sullivan Arena (5,836); Anchorage, AK
12/03/2008*; 6:05 pm		at Northern Colorado	W 73–62	6–1	Butler–Hancock Sports Pavilion (1,265); Greeley, CO
12/06/2008*; 7:00 pm, The Mtn.		San Diego; City Championship	W 57–46	7–1	Cox Arena (9,923); San Diego, CA
12/10/2008*; 6:00 pm, FSAZ		at Arizona	L 56–69	7–2	McKale Center (13,156); Tucson, AZ
12/13/2008*; 1:30 pm, 4SD		vs. Saint Mary's; John R. Wooden Classic	L 64–67	7–3	Honda Center (N/A); Anaheim, CA
12/20/2008*; 1:00 pm, The Mtn.		UC Santa Barbara	W 68–51	8–3	Cox Arena (5,042); San Diego, CA
12/22/2008*; 7:00 pm		Cal State Northridge	W 72–56	9–3	Cox Arena (4,518); San Diego, CA
12/29/2008*; 7:00 pm		Arkansas–Pine Bluff	W 93–61	10–3	Cox Arena (4,441); San Diego, CA
01/03/2009; 6:00 pm		at Air Force	W 61–44	11–3 (1–0)	Clune Arena (2,564); Colorado Springs, CO
01/10/2009; 1:00 pm, Versus		Utah	W 72–63	12–3 (2–0)	Cox Arena (6,256); San Diego, CA
01/14/2009; 5:00 pm, The Mtn.		at Wyoming	L 79–83	12–4 (2–1)	Arena-Auditorium (5,568); Laramie, WY
01/21/2009; 7:30 pm, The Mtn.		New Mexico	W 81–76	13–4 (3–1)	Cox Arena (8,001); San Diego, CA
01/24/2009; 6:00 pm, The Mtn.		at BYU	L 71–77	13–5 (3–2)	Marriott Center (13,871); Provo, UT
01/28/2009; 7:00 pm, CBSCS		TCU	W 67–50	14–5 (4–2)	Cox Arena (6,659); San Diego, CA
01/31/2009; 6:00 pm, The Mtn.		at Colorado State	W 78–59	15–5 (5–2)	Moby Arena (4,009); Fort Collins, CO
02/03/2009; 7:30 pm, The Mtn.		at UNLV	W 68–66 ^{OT}	16–5 (6–2)	Thomas & Mack Center (14,137); Paradise, NV
02/07/2009; 7:00 pm, CBSCS		Air Force	W 65–34	17–5 (7–2)	Cox Arena (9,116); San Diego, CA
02/11/2009; 7:00 pm, The Mtn.		at Utah	L 55–67	17–6 (7–3)	Jon M. Huntsman Center (9,782); Salt Lake City, UT
02/14/2009; 7:00 pm, The Mtn.		Wyoming	W 71–60	18–6 (8–3)	Cox Arena (6,428); San Diego, CA
02/21/2009; 12:00 pm, Versus		at New Mexico	L 49–75	18–7 (8–4)	University Arena (16,801); Albuquerque, NM
02/24/2009; 7:30 pm, The Mtn.		BYU	L 59–69	18–8 (8–5)	Cox Arena (9,631); San Diego, CA
02/28/2009; 5:30 pm, The Mtn.		at TCU	W 79–77 ^{OT}	19–8 (9–5)	Daniel–Meyer Coliseum (4,214); Fort Worth, TX
03/04/2009; 7:00 pm, The Mtn.		Colorado State	W 68–59	20–8 (10–5)	Cox Arena (5,350); San Diego, CA
03/07/2009; 7:00 pm, CBSCS		UNLV	W 57–46	21–8 (11–5)	Cox Arena (4,009); San Diego, CA
Mountain West tournament
03/12/2009; 2:30 pm, The Mtn.		at UNLV; Quarterfinals	W 71–57	22–8	Thomas & Mack Center (10,856); Paradise, NV
03/13/2009; 6:00 pm, CBSCS		vs. No. 25 BYU; Semifinals	W 64–62	23–8	Thomas & Mack Center (N/A); Paradise, NV
03/14/2009; 4:00 pm, Versus		vs. Utah; Championship Game	L 50–52	23–9	Thomas & Mack Center (10,307); Paradise, NV
National Invitation Tournament
03/17/2009*; 7:00 pm		Weber State; First Round	W 65–49	24–9	Cox Arena (4,314); San Diego, CA
03/20/2009*; 6:30 pm		Kansas State; Second Round	W 70–52	25–9	Jenny Craig Pavilion (5,100); San Diego, CA
03/25/2009*; 6:00 pm, ESPN		Saint Mary's; Quarterfinals	W 70–66	26–9	Cox Arena (12,414); San Diego, CA
03/31/2009*; 4:00 pm, ESPN		vs. Baylor; Semifinals	L 62–76	26–10	Madison Square Garden (11,352); New York City, NY
*Non-conference game. ^{#}Rankings from AP Poll. (#) Tournament seedings in parentheses.
