= 2009 National Invitation Tournament =

Annual NCAA basketball competition

- Season: 2008–09
- Teams: 32
- Finals site: Madison Square Garden, New York City
- Champions: Penn State Nittany Lions (1st title)
- Runner-up: Baylor Bears (1st title game)
- Semifinalists: Notre Dame Fighting Irish (6th semifinal); San Diego State Aztecs (1st semifinal)
- Winning coach: Ed DeChellis (1st title)
- MVP: Jamelle Cornley (Penn State)

The 2009 National Invitation Tournament was a single-elimination tournament of 32 National Collegiate Athletic Association (NCAA) Division I teams that were not selected to participate in the 2009 NCAA Division I men's basketball tournament. The 72nd annual tournament began on March 17 on campus sites and ended on April 2 at Madison Square Garden in New York City, with Penn State winning the final 69–63 over Baylor.

== Participants ==
=== Automatic qualifiers ===
The following teams won their conference regular season title, but failed to win conference post season tournaments. Therefore, they were not awarded their respective conference's automatic bid to the NCAA Tournament. When they did not receive at-large selections to the NCAA tournament either, they automatically qualified for the 2009 NIT.

Team	Conference	Record	Appearance	Last bid
Bowling Green	MAC	19–13	14th	2002
Davidson	Southern	26–7	5th	2005
Jacksonville	Atlantic Sun	18–13	5th	1987
UT Martin	Ohio Valley	22–9	1st	Never
Weber State	Big Sky	21–9	2nd	1984

=== Seedings ===
Seed	School	Conference	Record	Berth type
1	San Diego State	MWC	23–9	At-large
2	Saint Mary's	WCC	26–6	At-large
3	South Carolina	SEC	21–9	At-large
4	Kansas State	Big 12	21–11	At-large
5	Illinois State	MVC	24–9	At-large
6	Davidson	SoCon	26–7	Automatic
7	Washington State	Pac-10	17–15	At-large
8	Weber State	Big Sky	21–9	Automatic

Seed	School	Conference	Record	Berth type
1	Creighton	MVC	26–7	At-large
2	Notre Dame	Big East	18–14	At-large
3	New Mexico	MWC	21–11	At-large
4	Kentucky	SEC	20–13	At-large
5	UNLV	MWC	21–10	At-large
6	Nebraska	Big 12	18–12	At-large
7	UAB	C-USA	22–11	At-large
8	Bowling Green	MAC	19–13	Automatic

Seed	School	Conference	Record	Berth type
1	Auburn	SEC	22–11	At-large
2	Virginia Tech	ACC	18–14	At-large
3	Baylor	Big 12	20–14	At-large
4	Tulsa	C-USA	24–10	At-large
5	Northwestern	Big Ten	17–13	At-large
6	Georgetown	Big East	16–14	At-large
7	Duquesne	A-10	21–12	At-large
8	UT Martin	OVC	22–9	Automatic

Seed	School	Conference	Record	Berth type
1	Florida	SEC	23–10	At-large
2	Penn State	Big Ten	22–11	At-large
3	Niagara	MAAC	26–8	At-large
4	Miami (FL)	ACC	18–12	At-large
5	Providence	Big East	19–13	At-large
6	Rhode Island	A-10	22–10	At-large
7	George Mason	CAA	22–10	At-large
8	Jacksonville	A-Sun	18–13	Automatic

== Bracket ==
Played on the home court of the higher-seeded team (except #4 Miami (FL) at #5 Providence)

First round
1	San Diego State	65
8	Weber State	49
4	Kansas State	83*
5	Illinois State	79
3	South Carolina	63
6	Davidson	70
2	Saint Mary's	68
7	Washington State	57

Second round
1	San Diego State	70
4	Kansas State	52
6	Davidson	68
2	Saint Mary's	80

Quarterfinals
1	San Diego State	70
2	Saint Mary's	66

First round
1	Auburn	87
8	UT Martin	82
4	Tulsa	68
5	Northwestern	59
3	Baylor	74
6	Georgetown	72
2	Virginia Tech	116**
7	Duquesne	108

Second round
1	Auburn	74
4	Tulsa	55
3	Baylor	84
2	Virginia Tech	66

Quarterfinals
1	Auburn	72
3	Baylor	74

First round
1	Creighton	73
8	Bowling Green	71
4	Kentucky	70
5	UNLV	60
3	New Mexico	83
6	Nebraska	71
2	Notre Dame	70
7	UAB	64

Second round
1	Creighton	63
4	Kentucky	65
3	New Mexico	68
2	Notre Dame	70

Quarterfinals
4	Kentucky	67
2	Notre Dame	77

First round
1	Florida	84
8	Jacksonville	62
4	Miami (FL)	78
5	Providence	66
3	Niagara	62
6	Rhode Island	68
2	Penn State	77*
7	George Mason	73

Second round
1	Florida	74
4	Miami (FL)	60
6	Rhode Island	72
2	Penn State	83

Quarterfinals
1	Florida	62
2	Penn State	71

=== Semifinals and finals ===
Played at Madison Square Garden in New York City on March 31 and April 2

Semifinals
1	San Diego State	62
3	Baylor	76
2	Notre Dame	59
2	Penn State	67

Final
3	Baylor	63
2	Penn State	69

* denotes each overtime played

== Game summaries ==
=== NIT Championship ===
Team	1st half	2nd half	Final
Penn State	25	44	69
Baylor	29	34	63

The Penn State Nittany Lions faced off against the Baylor Bears in the NIT Championship game. The Nittany Lions won the matchup 69–63, aided by Jamelle Cornley's 18 points. In a four-point deficit at the half, the Lions went on a 7–1 spurt to take a 2-point lead at the beginning of the second. After the Bears tied it at 37, Penn State made three consecutive threes from which Baylor could not recover.

== See also ==
- 2009 Women's National Invitation Tournament
- 2009 NCAA Division I men's basketball tournament
- 2009 NCAA Division II men's basketball tournament
- 2009 NCAA Division III men's basketball tournament
- 2009 NCAA Division I women's basketball tournament
- 2009 NCAA Division II women's basketball tournament
- 2009 NCAA Division III women's basketball tournament
- 2009 NAIA Division I men's basketball tournament
- 2009 NAIA Division II men's basketball tournament
- 2009 NAIA Division I women's basketball tournament
- 2009 NAIA Division II women's basketball tournament
- 2009 College Basketball Invitational
- 2009 CollegeInsider.com Postseason Tournament
