= 2008–09 Chattanooga Mocs basketball team =

American college basketball season

2008–09 Chattanooga Mocs men's basketball

Southern Conference Tournament champion

NCAA tournament, Round of 64
- Conference: Southern Conference
- North
- Record: 18–17 (11–9 SoCon)
- Head coach: John Shulman (5th season)
- Assistant coaches: David Conrady; Brent Jolly
- Home arena: McKenzie Arena

2008–09 Southern Conference men's basketball standings
| | Conf. | | | | Overall |
| Team | W | | L | PCT | W | | L | PCT |
|---|---|---|---|---|---|---|---|---|
North
| Western Carolina | 11 | – | 9 | .550 | 16 | – | 15 | .516 |
| Chattanooga † | 11 | – | 9 | .550 | 18 | – | 17 | .514 |
| Samford | 9 | – | 11 | .450 | 16 | – | 16 | .500 |
| Appalachian State | 9 | – | 11 | .450 | 13 | – | 18 | .419 |
| Elon | 7 | – | 13 | .350 | 11 | – | 20 | .355 |
| UNC Greensboro | 4 | – | 16 | .200 | 5 | – | 25 | .167 |
South
| Davidson | 18 | – | 2 | .900 | 27 | – | 8 | .771 |
| The Citadel | 15 | – | 5 | .750 | 20 | – | 13 | .606 |
| Charleston | 15 | – | 5 | .750 | 27 | – | 9 | .750 |
| Wofford | 12 | – | 8 | .600 | 16 | – | 14 | .533 |
| Georgia Southern | 5 | – | 15 | .250 | 8 | – | 22 | .267 |
| Furman | 4 | – | 16 | .200 | 6 | – | 24 | .200 |
† SoCon Tournament winner As of April 30, 2009; Rankings from AP Poll

The 2008–09 Chattanooga Mocs men's basketball team represented the University of Tennessee at Chattanooga in the 2008–09 NCAA Division I men's basketball season. The Mocs, led by head coach John Shulman, played their home games at the McKenzie Arena in Chattanooga, Tennessee, as members of the Southern Conference. The Mocs won a share of the SoCon North Division title, and won the 2009 SoCon tournament, earning an automatic bid to the NCAA tournament as the 16th seed in the West region. Chattanooga was beaten by top seed Connecticut in the first round, 103–47.

== Roster ==
2008–09 Chattanooga Mocs men's basketball team
Players
Coaches

| Pos. | # | Name | Height | Weight | Year | Hometown |
|---|---|---|---|---|---|---|
| G | 0 | Stephen McDowell | 5 ft 11 in (1.8 m) | — | GS | Indianapolis, Indiana |
| G | 1 | Jasper Williams | 6 ft 2 in (1.88 m) | — | Fr | Washington, D.C. |
| G | 2 | Dontay Hampton | 6 ft 1 in (1.85 m) | — | Fr | Chattanooga, Tennessee |
| F | 4 | Dante Harvey | 6 ft 6 in (1.98 m) | — | Fr | Stone Mountain, Georgia |
| F | 5 | Chris Early | 6 ft 7 in (2.01 m) | — | Fr | Huntington, West Virginia |
| G | 11 | Zach Ferrell | 6 ft 1 in (1.85 m) | — | Sr | Nashville, Tennessee |
| G | 14 | Jeff Smith | 6 ft 5 in (1.96 m) | — | RS So | Chattanooga, Tennessee |
| G | 22 | Ricky Taylor | 6 ft 5 in (1.96 m) | — | Fr | Brownsville, Tennessee |
| G | 23 | Ty Patterson | 6 ft 6 in (1.98 m) | — | Jr | Anderson, South Carolina |
| G | 31 | Keyron Sheard | 6 ft 2 in (1.88 m) | — | Sr | Red Bank, New Jersey |
| F | 33 | Kevin Goffney | 6 ft 5 in (1.96 m) | — | Sr | Ethel, Louisiana |
| F | 34 | Nicchaeus Doaks | 6 ft 7 in (2.01 m) | — | Sr | Trenton, Tennessee |
| F | 44 | Khalil Hartwell | 6 ft 8 in (2.03 m) | — | Sr | Philadelphia, Pennsylvania |
| C | 53 | Jeremy Saffore | 7 ft 1 in (2.16 m) | — | RS So | Nashville, Tennessee |

Head coach

- John Shulman (East Tennessee State)

Assistant coach(es)

- David Conrady (Furman)
- Brent Jolly (Tennessee Tech)

Legend

- (C) Team captain
- (S) Suspended
- (I) Ineligible
- (W) Walk-on
- Injured
- Current redshirt

Roster
Last update: October 14, 2022

== Schedule and results ==
| Date time, TV | Rank^{#} | Opponent^{#} | Result | Record | Site city, state |
Regular season
| November 15, 2008*; 7:00 pm | | at No. 14 Tennessee | L 75–114 | 0–1 | Thompson–Boling Arena (21,864); Knoxville, TN |
| November 17, 2008*; 8:00 pm | | at Missouri; Puerto Rico Tip-Off Opening Round | L 75–103 | 0–2 | Mizzou Arena (5,275); Columbia, MO |
| November 20, 2008*; 4:30 pm | | vs. No. 13 Memphis; Puerto Rico Tip-Off | L 71–83 | 0–3 | Coliseo de Puerto Rico; San Juan, Puerto Rico |
| November 21, 2008*; 5:00 pm | | vs. No. 20 USC; Puerto Rico Tip-Off | L 46–73 | 0–4 | Coliseo de Puerto Rico; San Juan, Puerto Rico |
| November 23, 2008*; 10:30 am | | vs. Fairfield; Puerto Rico Tip-Off | L 42–61 | 0–5 | Coliseo de Puerto Rico; San Juan, Puerto Rico |
| November 29, 2008*; 7:30 pm | | Tennessee Temple | W 108–67 | 1–5 | McKenzie Arena (2,494); Chattanooga, TN |
| December 13, 2008; 7:00 pm | | at No. 20 Davidson | L 95–100 | 1–6 (0–1) | John M. Belk Arena (5,223); Davidson, NC |
| December 17, 2008*; 7:00 pm | | at East Tennessee State | L 70–82 | 1–7 | Memorial Center (3,102); Johnson City, TN |
| December 20, 2008*; 8:00 pm | | at Mississippi Valley State | W 65–61 | 2–7 | Harrison HPER Complex (245); Itta Bena, MS |
| December 22, 2008*; 7:00 pm | | at Alabama | L 63–82 | 2–8 | Coleman Coliseum (8,511); Tuscaloosa, AL |
| December 29, 2008*; 8:00 pm | | Tennessee Wesleyan; Dr. Pepper Classic | W 102–70 | 3–8 | McKenzie Arena (3,176); Chattanooga, TN |
| December 30, 2008*; 8:00 pm | | vs. Niagara; Dr. Pepper Classic | W 99–84 | 4–8 | McKenzie Arena (3,569); Chattanooga, TN |
| January 3, 2009; 5:30 pm | | at Georgia Southern | L 74–78 | 4–9 (0–2) | Hanner Fieldhouse (2,285); Statesboro, GA |
| January 8, 2009; 7:00 pm | | Wofford | L 66–69 | 4–10 (0–3) | McKenzie Arena (2,843); Chattanooga, TN |
| January 10, 2009; 7:00 pm | | Furman | W 73–46 | 5–10 (1–3) | McKenzie Arena (3,160); Chattanooga, TN |
| January 12, 2009; 7:05 pm | | at The Citadel | W 76–70 | 6–10 (2–3) | McAlister Field House (1,326); Charleston, SC |
| January 15, 2009; 7:00 pm | | Appalachian State | W 78–74 ^{OT} | 7–10 (3–3) | McKenzie Arena (3,208); Chattanooga, TN |
| January 17, 2009; 7:30 pm | | Western Carolina | W 82–75 | 8–10 (4–3) | McKenzie Arena (3,863); Chattanooga, TN |
| January 22, 2009; 7:00 pm | | at UNC Greensboro | W 72–54 | 9–10 (5–3) | Fleming Gymnasium (968); Greensboro, NC |
| January 24, 2009; 7:00 pm | | at Elon | L 85–86 ^{2OT} | 9–11 (5–4) | Alumni Gym (1,222); Elon, NC |
| January 28, 2009; 7:00 pm | | Davidson | L 70–92 | 9–12 (5–5) | McKenzie Arena (9,234); Chattanooga, TN |
| January 31, 2009; 5:00 pm | | Georgia Southern | W 100–87 | 10–12 (6–5) | McKenzie Arena (3,810); Chattanooga, TN |
| February 5, 2009; 7:00 pm | | at Wofford | W 84–77 | 11–12 (7–5) | Benjamin Johnson Arena (1,439); Spartanburg, SC |
| February 7, 2009; 4:00 pm | | at Furman | L 70–72 | 11–13 (7–6) | Timmons Arena (2,006); Greenville, SC |
| February 9, 2009; 8:30 pm | | at Samford | W 66–56 | 12–13 (8–6) | Pete Hanna Center (1,021); Birmingham |
| February 12, 2009; 7:00 pm | | Elon | W 76–54 | 13–13 (9–6) | McKenzie Arena (3,190); Chattanooga, TN |
| February 14, 2009; 7:00 pm | | UNC Greensboro | W 84–75 | 14–13 (10–6) | McKenzie Arena (3,301); Chattanooga, TN |
| February 21, 2009; 7:00 pm | | Samford | W 67–62 | 15–13 (11–6) | McKenzie Arena (4,273); Chattanooga, TN |
| February 23, 2009; 7:00 pm | | College of Charleston | L 77–86 | 15–14 (11–7) | McKenzie Arena (3,414); Chattanooga, TN |
| February 26, 2009; 7:00 pm | | at Appalachian State | L 82–88 | 15–15 (11–8) | Holmes Center (1,387); Boone, NC |
| February 28, 2009; 7:00 pm | | at Western Carolina | L 77–86 | 15–16 (11–9) | Ramsey Center (2,679); Cullowhee, NC |
Southern Conference tournament
| March 7, 2009; 7:00 pm | (N1) | (N5) Elon; SoCon Quarterfinals | W 79–78 | 16–16 | McKenzie Arena (4,560); Chattanooga, TN |
| March 8, 2009; 8:30 pm | (N1) | (N3) Samford; SoCon Semifinals | W 81–70 | 17–16 | McKenzie Arena (5,497); Chattanooga, TN |
| March 9, 2009; 7:00 pm | (N1) | (S3) College of Charleston; SoCon Championship | W 80–69 | 18–16 | McKenzie Arena (5,042); Chattanooga, TN |
NCAA tournament
| March 19, 2009 | (16 W) | vs. (1 W) No. 5 Connecticut; NCAA First Round | L 47–103 | 18–17 | Wachovia Center (18,322); Philadelphia, PA |
*Non-conference game. ^{#}Rankings from AP Poll. (#) Tournament seedings in parentheses. All times are in Eastern Time.
