= 2008–09 Utah Utes men's basketball team =

American college basketball season

2008–09 Utah Utes men's basketball

MWC tournament champions

NCAA tournament, first round
- Conference: Mountain West Conference

Ranking
- AP: No. 25
- Record: 24–10 (12–4 Mountain West)
- Head coach: Jim Boylen (2nd season)
- Assistant coaches: Jeff Smith; Barret Peery; Stan Johnson
- Home arena: Jon M. Huntsman Center

2008–09 Mountain West Conference men's basketball standings
	Conf.				Overall
Team	W		L	PCT	W		L	PCT
BYU	12	–	4	.750	25	–	8	.758
No. 25 Utah †	12	–	4	.750	25	–	10	.714
New Mexico	12	–	4	.750	22	–	12	.647
San Diego State	11	–	5	.688	26	–	10	.722
UNLV	9	–	7	.563	21	–	11	.656
Wyoming	7	–	9	.438	19	–	14	.576
TCU	5	–	11	.313	14	–	17	.452
Colorado State	4	–	12	.250	9	–	22	.290
Air Force	0	–	16	.000	10	–	21	.323
† Mountain West tournament winner As of April 1, 2009; Rankings from AP Poll

The 2008–09 Utah Utes men's basketball team represented the University of Utah during the 2008–09 NCAA Division I men's basketball season. They played their home games at the Jon M. Huntsman Center in Salt Lake City, Utah, United States, and were a member of the Mountain West Conference. The Utes were led by second-year head coach Jim Boylen. They finished the season 24–10 (12–4 in Mountain West play) and won the 2009 Mountain West Conference men's basketball tournament to earn an automatic bid to the NCAA tournament. As No. 5 seed in the Midwest region, Utah lost to Arizona in the Round of 64.

== Roster ==
2008–09 Utah Utes men's basketball team
Players
Coaches

Pos.	#	Name	Height	Weight	Year	Hometown
G	5	Luka Drča	6 ft 5 in (1.96 m)	205 lb (93 kg)	Jr	Belgrade, Serbia
G	11	Lawrence Borha	6 ft 3 in (1.91 m)	205 lb (93 kg)	Sr	Staten Island, New York
F	21	Shaun Green	6 ft 8 in (2.03 m)	220 lb (100 kg)	Sr	Salt Lake City, Utah
C	50	Luke Nevill	7 ft 2 in (2.18 m)	265 lb (120 kg)	Sr	Perth, Western Australia

Head coach

- Jim Boylen

Assistant coach(es)

Legend

- (C) Team captain
- (S) Suspended
- (I) Ineligible
- (W) Walk-on
- Injured
- Current redshirt

Roster

== Schedule and results ==
Date time, TV	Rank^{#}	Opponent^{#}	Result	Record	Site (attendance) city, state
Non-conference regular season
Nov 15, 2008*		Southwest Baptist	L 79–80	0–1	Jon M. Huntsman Center; Salt Lake City, Utah
Nov 18, 2008*		Green Bay	W 79–60	1–1	Jon M. Huntsman Center; Salt Lake City, Utah
Nov 21, 2008*		vs. Ole Miss	W 83–72	2–1	Ocean Center; Daytona Beach, Florida
Nov 22, 2008*		vs. Morgan State	W 66–37	3–1	Ocean Center; Daytona Beach, Florida
Nov 28, 2008*		at Missouri State	W 71–58	4–1	JQH Arena; Springfield, Missouri
Dec 3, 2008*		Oregon	W 95–81	5–1	Jon M. Huntsman Center; Salt Lake City, Utah
Dec 6, 2008*		at Idaho State	L 68–72	5–2	Holt Arena; Pocatello, Idaho
Dec 10, 2008*		California	L 69–72	5–3	Jon M. Huntsman Center; Salt Lake City, Utah
Dec 13, 2008*		at No. 5 Oklahoma	L 52–70	5–4	Lloyd Noble Center; Norman, Oklahoma
Dec 20, 2008*		Weber State	W 74–64	6–4	Jon M. Huntsman Center; Salt Lake City, Utah
Dec 22, 2008*		at Utah State	L 64–66	6–5	Dee Glen Smith Spectrum; Logan, Utah
Dec 27, 2008*		at UC Irvine	W 60–52	7–5	Bren Events Center; Irvine, California
Dec 31, 2008*; CBS		No. 16 Gonzaga	W 66–65	8–5	Jon M. Huntsman Center (12,571); Salt Lake City, Utah
MWC Regular season
Jan 3, 2009		Wyoming	W 91–67	9–5 (1–0)	Jon M. Huntsman Center; Salt Lake City, Utah
Jan 6, 2009*		LSU	W 91–61	10–5	Jon M. Huntsman Center; Salt Lake City, Utah
Jan 10, 2009		at San Diego State	L 63–72	10–6 (1–1)	Viejas Arena; San Diego, California
Jan 14, 2009		at Air Force	W 57–36	11–6 (2–1)	Clune Arena; Colorado Springs, Colorado
Jan 17, 2009		Colorado State	W 82–66	12–6 (3–1)	Jon M. Huntsman Center; Salt Lake City, Utah
Jan 24, 2009		at UNLV	L 65–75	12–7 (3–2)	Thomas & Mack Center; Las Vegas, Nevada
Jan 27, 2009		BYU	W 94–88 ^{OT}	13–7 (4–2)	Jon M. Huntsman Center; Salt Lake City, Utah
Jan 31, 2009		New Mexico	W 69–68	14–7 (5–2)	Jon M. Huntsman Center; Salt Lake City, Utah
Feb 4, 2009		at TCU	W 62–54	15–7 (6–2)	Daniel-Meyer Coliseum; Fort Worth, Texas
Feb 7, 2009		at Wyoming	W 80–70	16–7 (7–2)	Arena-Auditorium; Laramie, Wyoming
Feb 11, 2009		San Diego State	W 67–55	17–7 (8–2)	Jon M. Huntsman Center; Salt Lake City, Utah
Feb 14, 2009		Air Force	W 74–59	18–7 (9–2)	Jon M. Huntsman Center; Salt Lake City, Utah
Feb 18, 2009		at Colorado State	W 89–79 ^{OT}	19–7 (10–2)	Moby Arena; Fort Collins, Colorado
Feb 25, 2009		UNLV	W 70–60	20–7 (11–2)	Jon M. Huntsman Center; Salt Lake City, Utah
Feb 28, 2009		at BYU	L 50–63	20–8 (11–3)	Marriott Center; Provo, Utah
Mar 3, 2009		at New Mexico	L 71–77	20–9 (11–4)	The Pit; Albuquerque, New Mexico
Mar 7, 2009		TCU	W 68–49	21–9 (12–4)	Jon M. Huntsman Center; Salt Lake City, Utah
MWC tournament
Mar 12, 2009*	(2)	vs. (7) TCU; Quarterfinals	W 61–58	22–9	Thomas & Mack Center; Paradise, Nevada
Mar 13, 2009*	(2)	vs. (6) Wyoming; Semifinals	W 68–55	23–9	Thomas & Mack Center; Paradise, Nevada
Mar 14, 2009*	(2)	vs. (4) San Diego State; Championship Game	W 52–50	24–9	Thomas & Mack Center; Paradise, Nevada
NCAA tournament
Mar 20, 2009*	(5 MW) No. 25	vs. (12 MW) Arizona; First Round	L 71–84	24–10	American Airlines Arena; Miami, Florida
*Non-conference game. ^{#}Rankings from AP Poll/Coaches' Poll. (#) Tournament seedings in parentheses. MW=Midwest. All times are in Mountain Time.
