= 2008–09 Wyoming Cowboys basketball team =

American college basketball season

2008–09 Wyoming Cowboys basketball

CBI, First Round
- Conference: Mountain West Conference
- Record: 19–14 (7–9 MWC)
- Head coach: Heath Schroyer
- Assistant coaches: Fred Langley; Shaun Vandiver; Anthony Stewart
- Home arena: Arena-Auditorium

2008–09 Mountain West Conference men's basketball standings
	Conf.				Overall
Team	W		L	PCT	W		L	PCT
BYU	12	–	4	.750	25	–	8	.758
No. 25 Utah †	12	–	4	.750	25	–	10	.714
New Mexico	12	–	4	.750	22	–	12	.647
San Diego State	11	–	5	.688	26	–	10	.722
UNLV	9	–	7	.563	21	–	11	.656
Wyoming	7	–	9	.438	19	–	14	.576
TCU	5	–	11	.313	14	–	17	.452
Colorado State	4	–	12	.250	9	–	22	.290
Air Force	0	–	16	.000	10	–	21	.323
† Mountain West tournament winner As of April 1, 2009; Rankings from AP Poll

The 2008–09 Wyoming Cowboys basketball team represented the University of Wyoming in the 2008–09 NCAA Division I men's basketball season. They compete in the Mountain West Conference. Wyoming advanced to the semifinals of the 2009 Mountain West tournament, where they lost to Utah. They were invited to the 2009 College Basketball Invitational, where they lost in the first round to Northeastern.

== Roster ==
2008–09 Wyoming Cowboys men's basketball team
Players
Coaches

Pos.	#	Name	Height	Weight	Year	Previous school	Hometown
G	0	Sean Ogirri	6 ft 3 in (1.91 m)	200 lb (91 kg)	Sr	Wichita State; Denver East HS	Denver, CO
F	5	Ryan Dermody	6 ft 8 in (2.03 m)	195 lb (88 kg)	Jr	Loveland HS	Loveland, CO
F	11	Afam Muojeke	6 ft 8 in (2.03 m)	210 lb (95 kg)	Fr	Genesis One Prep	Jamaica, NY
G	12	Galand Thaxton	6 ft 2 in (1.88 m)	175 lb (79 kg)	Fr	Laramie HS	Laramie, WY
C	13	Mikhail Linskens	7 ft 0 in (2.13 m)	260 lb (118 kg)	So	K.A. Redingenhof Leuven	Bredene, Belgium
C	15	Adam Waddell	6 ft 10 in (2.08 m)	235 lb (107 kg)	Fr	Cody HS	Cody, WY
F	21	Tyson Johnson	6 ft 5 in (1.96 m)	245 lb (111 kg)	Sr	Blinn CC; St. Mary's HS	Long Island, NY
G	23	Brandon Ewing	6 ft 2 in (1.88 m)	190 lb (86 kg)	Sr	Julian HS	Chicago, IL
F	25	Djibirl Thiam	6 ft 10 in (2.08 m)	215 lb (98 kg)	So	Baylor; Stoneridge Prep	Dakar, Senegal
F	32	Mahamoud Diakite	6 ft 7 in (2.01 m)	225 lb (102 kg)	Jr	Antelope Valley CC; Western Illinois	Paris, France
G	51	A.J. Davis	6 ft 6 in (1.98 m)	195 lb (88 kg)	Fr	Harmony Community School	Columbus, OH

Head coach

- Heath Schroyer (Armstrong Atlantic State)

Assistant coach(es)

- Fred Langley (Fresno State)
- Shaun Vandiver (Colorado)
- Anthony Stewart (Mount Union)

Legend

- (C) Team captain
- (S) Suspended
- (I) Ineligible
- (W) Walk-on
- Injured
- Current redshirt

== Schedule ==
Date time, TV	Rank^{#}	Opponent^{#}	Result	Record	Site (attendance) city, state
Exhibition
11/08/2008*; 7:00 pm		Colorado School of Mines	W 72–60	–	Arena-Auditorium (4,728); Laramie, WY
Regular Season
11/14/2008*; 7:00 pm		Cal State Bakersfield	W 84–58	1–0	Arena-Auditorium (4,650); Laramie, WY
11/19/2008*; 7:00 pm		Prairie View A&M	W 80–75	2–0	Arena-Auditorium (6,896); Laramie, WY
11/22/2008*; 6:00 pm		Johnson & Wales	W 105–64	3–0	Arena-Auditorium (5,375); Laramie, WY
11/26/2008*; 7:00 pm		Texas State	W 97–96	4–0	Arena-Auditorium (4,415); Laramie, WY
11/29/2008*; 4:00 pm, The Mtn.		Denver	W 62–54	5–0	Arena-Auditorium (4,761); Laramie, WY
12/03/2008*; 7:05 pm		at Boise State	L 85–86	5–1	Taco Bell Arena (3,065); Boise, ID
12/06/2008*; 8:00 pm		at Loyola Marymount	W 62–55	6–1	Gersten Pavilion (2,440); Los Angeles, CA
12/13/2008*; 3:30 pm		vs. Northern Iowa; Blue Cross/Blue Shield Wyoming Shootout	W 74–65	7–1	Casper Events Center (4,048); Casper, WY
12/16/2008*; 7:00 pm		Western State	W 100–73	8–1	Arena-Auditorium (4,291); Laramie, WY
12/20/2008*; 2:00 pm		Sacramento State	W 93–70	9–1	Arena-Auditorium (4,497); Laramie, WY
12/23/2008*; 8:30 pm		at No. 13 UCLA	L 62–113	9–2	Pauley Pavilion (8,795); Los Angeles, CA
12/29/2008*; 5:30 pm		vs. Houston Baptist; Utah State Duel in the Desert	W 84–74	10–2	Dee Glen Smith Spectrum (4,088); Logan, UT
12/30/2008*; 5:30 pm		vs. Howard; Utah State Duel in the Desert	W 84–75	11–2	Dee Glen Smith Spectrum (3,827); Logan, UT
12/31/2008*; 8:00 pm		at Utah State; Utah State Duel in the Desert	L 85–90 ^{OT}	11–3	Dee Glen Smith Spectrum (8,877); Logan, UT
01/03/2008; 2:00 pm, The Mtn.		at Utah	L 67–91	11–4 (0–1)	Jon M. Huntsman Center (8,649); Salt Lake City, UT
01/14/2009; 6:00 pm, The Mtn.		San Diego State	W 83–79	12–4 (1–1)	Arena-Auditorium (5,568); Laramie, WY
01/17/2009; 8:00 pm, The Mtn.		at UNLV	L 66–83	12–5 (1–2)	Thomas & Mack Center (17,190); Las Vegas, NV
01/21/2009; 6:00 pm, The Mtn.		at TCU	L 78–79 ^{OT}	12–6 (1–3)	Daniel-Meyer Coliseum (3,450); Fort Worth, TX
01/24/2009; 4:00 pm, The Mtn.		Colorado State	W 83–74	13–6 (2–3)	Arena-Auditorium (7,014); Laramie, WY
01/27/2009; 6:00 pm, The Mtn.		Air Force	W 72–59	14–6 (3–3)	Arena-Auditorium (4,841); Laramie, WY
01/31/2009; 4:00 pm, The Mtn.		at BYU	L 60–84	14–7 (3–4)	Marriott Center (16,347); Provo, UT
02/03/2009; 8:00 pm, CBSCS		at New Mexico	L 57–86	14–8 (3–5)	University Arena (13,081); Albuquerque, NM
02/07/2009; 2:00 pm, The Mtn.		Utah	L 70–80	14–9 (3–6)	Arena-Auditorium (5,853); Laramie, WY
02/14/2009; 8:00 pm, The Mtn.		at San Diego State	L 60–71	14–10 (3–7)	Cox Arena (6,428); San Diego, CA
2/18/2009; 8:00 pm, The Mtn.		UNLV	W 77–68	15–10 (4–7)	Arena-Auditorium (4,703); Laramie, WY
02/21/2009; 1:30 pm, The Mtn.		TCU	W 61–56	16–10 (5–7)	Arena-Auditorium (5,797); Laramie, WY
02/25/2009; 6:00 pm, The Mtn.		at Colorado State	W 82–79	17–10 (6–7)	Moby Arena (5,556); Fort Collins, CO
02/28/2009; 4:00 pm, The Mtn.		at Air Force	W 65–62	18–10 (7–7)	Clune Arena (3,808); Colorado Springs, CO
03/04/2009; 6:00 pm, The Mtn.		BYU	L 68–78	18–11 (7–8)	Arena-Auditorium (6,749); Laramie, WY
03/07/2009; 1:30 pm, The Mtn.		New Mexico	L 73–74	18–12 (7–9)	Arena-Auditorium (7,412); Laramie, WY
2009 Mountain West Conference men's basketball tournament
03/12/2009; 9:30 pm, The Mtn.		vs. New Mexico; Quarterfinals	W 75–67	19–12	Thomas & Mack Center (10,011); Las Vegas, NV
03/12/2009; 9:30 pm, CBSCS		vs. Utah; Semifinals	L 55–68	19–13	Thomas & Mack Center (11,629); Las Vegas, NV
2009 College Basketball Invitational
03/17/2010; 7:00 pm, HDNet		Northeastern; First Round	L 62–64	19–14	Arena-Auditorium (2,407); Laramie, WY
*Non-conference game. ^{#}Rankings from AP Poll. (#) Tournament seedings in parentheses. All times are in Mountain Time.
