= 2008–09 New Mexico Lobos men's basketball team =

American college basketball season

2008–09 New Mexico Lobos men's basketball

Mountain West Regular Season Co–Champions

2009 NIT, Second Round
- Conference: Mountain West Conference
- Record: 22–12 (12–4 Mountain West)
- Head coach: Steve Alford (2nd Year)
- Assistant coaches: Craig Neal (2nd Year); Wyking Jones; Ryan Miller (2nd Year)
- Home arena: The Pit, University Arena

2008–09 Mountain West Conference men's basketball standings
	Conf.				Overall
Team	W		L	PCT	W		L	PCT
BYU	12	–	4	.750	25	–	8	.758
No. 25 Utah †	12	–	4	.750	25	–	10	.714
New Mexico	12	–	4	.750	22	–	12	.647
San Diego State	11	–	5	.688	26	–	10	.722
UNLV	9	–	7	.563	21	–	11	.656
Wyoming	7	–	9	.438	19	–	14	.576
TCU	5	–	11	.313	14	–	17	.452
Colorado State	4	–	12	.250	9	–	22	.290
Air Force	0	–	16	.000	10	–	21	.323
† Mountain West tournament winner As of April 1, 2009; Rankings from AP Poll

The 2008–09 New Mexico Lobos men's basketball team represented the University of New Mexico as a member of the Mountain West Conference. The Lobos were coached by second-year head coach Steve Alford and played their home games at the University Arena, also known as "The Pit", in Albuquerque, New Mexico.

The Lobos finished the season 22–12, 12–4 in Mountain West play. They were Co–Champions of the Mountain West Conference with Utah and BYU. They were defeated by Wyoming in the semifinals of the 2009 Mountain West Conference men's basketball tournament. They invited of the 2009 National Invitation Tournament. They defeated Nebraska before losing to Notre Dame in the second round.

== Roster ==
2008–09 Roster
Name	Number	Pos.	Height	Weight	Year	Hometown	High School/Last College
A.J. Hardeman	00	F	6' 8"	225	Freshman	Del Valle, Texas	Del Valle HS
Jonathan Willis	2	G	6' 6"	185	Sophomore	Carson, California	Mayfield HS
Dion Williams	4	G	5' 11"	165	Freshman	Albuquerque, New Mexico	Willow Canyon HS
Dairese Gary	5	G	6' 1"	205	Sophomore	Elkhart, Indiana	Concord HS
Nate Garth	11	G	6' 2"	180	Freshman	Sacramento, California	Hamilton HS
Will Brown	15	F	6' 9"	225	Freshman	Dallas, Texas	Woodrow Wilson HS
Phillip McDonald	23	G	6' 5"	200	Freshman	Cypress, Texas	Cypress Springs HS
Román Martínez	30	F	6' 6"	185	Sophomore	El Paso, Texas	Montwood HS
Tony Danridge	32	G/F	6' 5"	215	Senior	San Bernardino, California	Cajon HS
Chad Toppert	33	G	6' 7"	215	Senior	Albuquerque, New Mexico	Academy HS
Chris Johansen	40	G	6' 4"	190	Freshman	Albuquerque, New Mexico	St. Pius X HS
Kem Nweke	42	C	6' 10"	265	Freshman	Missouri City, Texas	Thurgood Marshall HS
Daniel Faris	53	F	6' 9"	245	Senior	Albuquerque, New Mexico	Eldorado HS

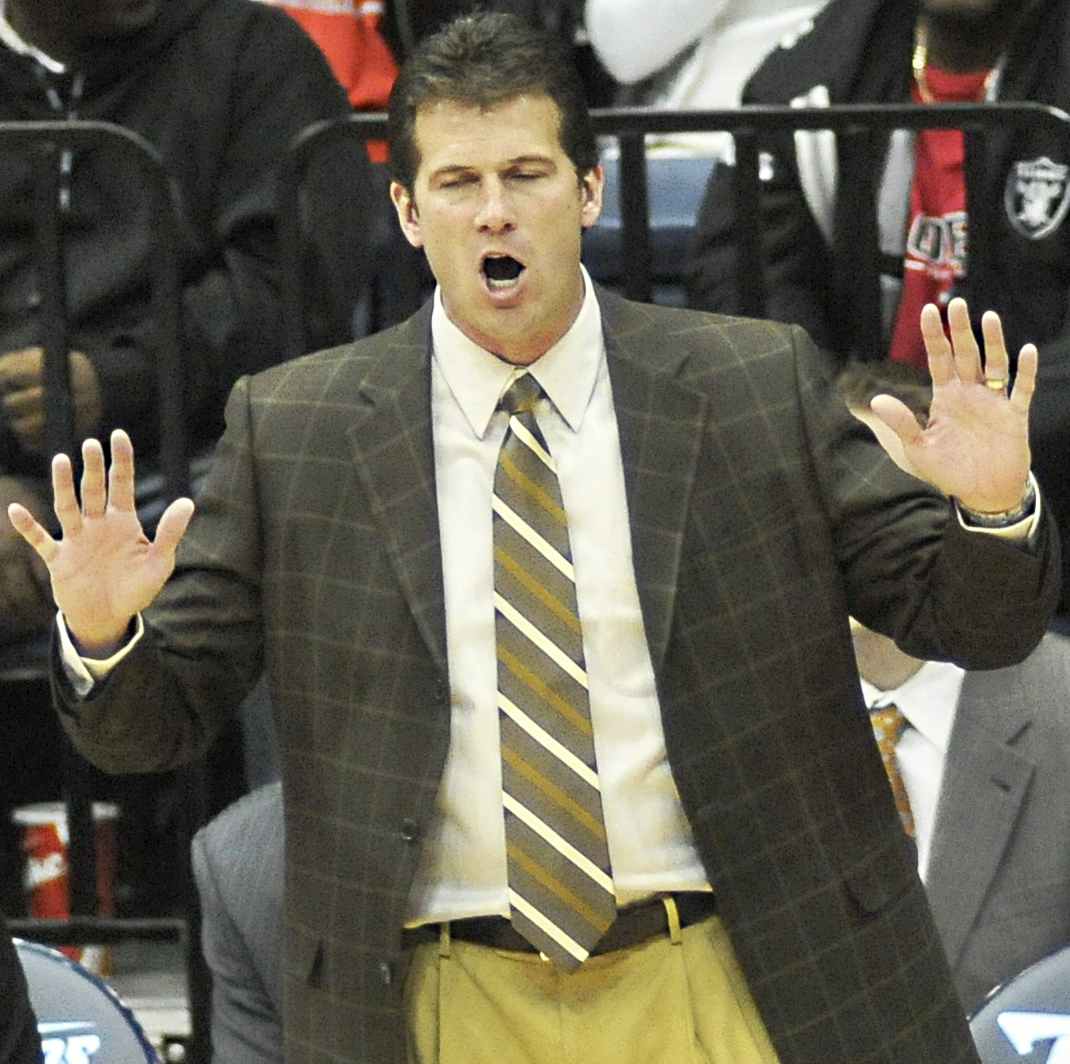
Lobo Coach Steve Alford

== Rankings ==
Ranking movement Legend: ██ Increase in ranking. ██ Decrease in ranking. ██ Not ranked the previous week.
Poll	Pre	Wk 1	Wk 2	Wk 3	Wk 4	Wk 5	Wk 6	Wk 7	Wk 8	Wk 9	Wk 10	Wk 11	Wk 12	Wk 13	Wk 14	Wk 15	Wk 16	Wk 17	Wk 18	Final
AP	NR	NR	NR	NR	NR									NR	NR	NR	NR	NR	RV	
Coaches	NR	NR	NR	NR	NR									NR	NR	NR	NR	NR	NR	

== 2008–2009 Schedule ==
Date time, TV	Rank^{#}	Opponent^{#}	Result	Record	Site (attendance) city, state
Exhibition
11/08/2008*; 3:00 pm, KASY		Western New Mexico	W 88–59	–	University Arena (11,658); Albuquerque, NM
Regular season
11/14/2008*; 7:00 pm		Southeast Missouri State	W 102–59	1–0	University Arena (13,031); Albuquerque, NM
11/16/2008*; 1:00 pm		at Creighton	L 75–82	1–1	Qwest Center Omaha (16,107); Omaha, NE
11/20/2008*; 7:00 pm, KASY		Grambling State; Cancún Challenge	W 96–50	2–1	University Arena (12,066); Albuquerque, NM
11/22/2008*; 7:00 pm, KASY		UCF; Cancún Challenge	L 71–72	2–2	University Arena (12,707); Albuquerque, NM
11/24/2008*; 7:00 pm		Cal State Northridge	W 85–74	3–2	University Arena (12,101); Albuquerque, NM
11/29/2008*; 9:00 pm, CBSCS		vs. VCU; Cancún Challenge Semifinals	L 55–67	3–3	Aventura Spa Palace (213); Cancún, MX
11/30/2008*; 6:15 pm, CBSCS		vs. Drake; Cancún Challenge 3rd place game	L 62–68	3–4	Aventura Spa Palace (201); Cancún, MX
12/06/2008*; 4:00 pm, The Mtn.		Southern Miss	W 60–58	4–4	University Arena (12,465); Albuquerque, NM
12/10/2008*; 8:00 pm, KASY		at San Diego	W 57–54	5–4	Jenny Craig Pavilion (2,034); San Diego, CA
12/13/2008*; 2:00 pm, Versus		Ole Miss	W 103–70	6–4	University Arena (13,341); Albuquerque, NM
12/17/2008*; 6:30 pm, The Mtn.		Oral Roberts	W 66–63	7–4	University Arena (13,358); Albuquerque, NM
12/20/2008*; 11:00 am, KASY		at Texas Tech	L 78–86	7–5	United Spirit Arena (8,425); Lubbock, TX
12/23/2008*; 6:30 pm, The Mtn.		New Mexico State; Rio Grande Rivalry	W 76–62	8–5	University Arena (17,197); Albuquerque, NM
12/30/2008*; 7:00 pm, AggieVision		at New Mexico State; Rio Grande Rivalry	W 68–66	9–5	Pan American Center (10,285); Las Cruces, NM
01/03/2009; 8:30 pm, The Mtn.		at UNLV	L 58–60	9–6 (0–1)	Thomas & Mack Center (14,189); Paradise, NV
01/06/2009*; 7:00 pm		UTEP	L 60–73	9–7	University Arena (13,713); Albuquerque, NM
01/10/2009; 7:30 pm, The Mtn.		Air Force	W 78–53	10–7 (1–1)	University Arena (15,212); Albuquerque, NM
01/17/2009; 2:00 pm, Versus		BYU	W 81–62	11–7 (2–1)	University Arena (15,277); Albuquerque, NM
01/21/2009; 8:30 pm, The Mtn.		at San Diego State	L 76–81	11–8 (2–2)	Cox Arena (8,001); San Diego, CA
01/24/2009; 6:00 pm		at TCU	W 69–52	12–8 (3–2)	Daniel–Meyer Coliseum (5,590); Fort Worth, TX
01/28/2009; 7:30 pm, The Mtn.		Colorado State	W 68–50	13–8 (4–2)	University Arena (13,157); Albuquerque, NM
01/31/2009; 1:30 pm, The Mtn.		at Utah	L 68–69	13–9 (4–3)	Jon M. Huntsman Center (9,676); Salt Lake City, UT
02/03/2009; 8:00 pm, CBSCS		Wyoming	W 86–57	14–9 (5–3)	University Arena (13,081); Albuquerque, NM
02/07/2009; 6:00 pm, CBSCS		UNLV	W 73–69 ^{OT}	15–9 (6–3)	University Arena (17,407); Albuquerque, NM
02/11/2009; 8:00 pm, CBSCS		at Air Force	W 76–66	16–9 (7–3)	Clune Arena (1,874); Colorado Springs, CO
02/17/2009; 8:00 pm, The Mtn.		at BYU	L 62–73	16–10 (7–4)	Marriott Center (12,911); Provo, UT
02/21/2009; 1:00 pm, Versus		San Diego State	W 75–49	17–10 (8–4)	University Arena (16,801); Albuquerque, NM
02/24/2009; 6:30 pm, The Mtn.		TCU	W 76–62	18–10 (9–4)	University Arena (14,777); Albuquerque, NM
02/28/2009; 7:00 pm		at Colorado State	W 81–79 ^{2OT}	19–10 (10–4)	Moby Arena (3,023); Fort Collins, CO
03/03/2009; 7:00 pm, The Mtn.		Utah	W 77–71	20–10 (11–4)	University Arena (18,018); Albuquerque, NM
03/07/2009; 1:30 pm, The Mtn.		at Wyoming	W 74–73	21–10 (12–4)	Arena-Auditorium (7,412); Laramie, WY
2009 MWC men's basketball tournament
03/12/2009; 9:30 pm, The Mtn.		vs. Wyoming; Quarterfinals	L 67–75	21–11	Thomas & Mack Center (10,011); Paradise, NV
2009 National Invitation Tournament
03/17/2009*; 8:00 pm, ESPNU		Nebraska; First Round	W 83–71	22–11	University Arena (7,974); Albuquerque, NM
03/19/2009*; 5:00 pm, ESPN2		at Notre Dame; Second Round	L 66–70	22–12	Joyce Center (3,013); Notre Dame, IN
*Non-conference game. ^{#}Rankings from AP Poll. (#) Tournament seedings in parentheses.
