= 2004–05 Chattanooga Mocs basketball team =

American college basketball season

2004–05 Chattanooga Mocs basketball

SoCon tournament champion

NCAA tournament, Round of 64
- Conference: Southern Conference
- North
- Record: 20–11 (10–6 SoCon)
- Head coach: John Shulman (1st season)
- Assistant coaches: David Conrady; Brent Jolly
- Home arena: McKenzie Arena

2004–05 Southern Conference men's basketball standings
	Conf.				Overall
Team	W		L	PCT	W		L	PCT
North
Chattanooga †	10	–	6	.625	20	–	11	.645
UNC Greensboro	9	–	7	.563	18	–	12	.600
Appalachian State	9	–	7	.563	18	–	12	.600
Elon	5	–	11	.313	8	–	23	.258
East Tennessee State	4	–	12	.250	10	–	19	.345
Western Carolina	3	–	13	.188	8	–	22	.267
South
Davidson	16	–	0	1.000	23	–	9	.719
College of Charleston	10	–	6	.625	18	–	10	.643
Georgia Southern	10	–	6	.625	18	–	13	.581
Furman	9	–	7	.563	16	–	13	.552
Wofford	7	–	9	.438	14	–	14	.500
The Citadel	4	–	12	.250	12	–	16	.429
† SoCon Tournament winner As of April 30, 2005; Rankings from AP poll

The 2004–05 Chattanooga Mocs men's basketball team represented the University of Tennessee at Chattanooga in the 2004–05 NCAA Division I men's basketball season. The Mocs, led by head coach John Shulman, played their home games at the McKenzie Arena in Chattanooga, Tennessee, as members of the Southern Conference. The Mocs finished atop the North Division standings, and won the 2005 SoCon tournament, earning an automatic bid to the NCAA tournament as the No. 15 seed in the Albuquerque region. Chattanooga was beaten by No. 2 seed Wake Forest in the opening round, 70–54.

== Roster ==
2004–05 Chattanooga Mocs men's basketball team
Players	Coaches
Pos. / # / Name / Height / Weight / Year / Hometown; G / 4 / Keddric Mays / 6 ft 0 in (1.83 m) / 180 lb (82 kg) / Jr / Livingston, Texas	Head coach: John Shulman (East Tennessee State); Assistant coach(es): David Conrady (Furman); Brent Jolly (Tennessee Tech); Legend: (C) Team captain; (S) Suspended; (I) Ineligible; (W) Walk-on; Injured; Current redshirt; Roster

== Schedule and results ==
Date time, TV	Rank^{#}	Opponent^{#}	Result	Record	Site city, state
Regular season
Nov 20, 2004*		Toccoa Falls	W 113–52	1–0	McKenzie Arena; Chattanooga, Tennessee
Nov 27, 2004*		at Ohio State	L 67–84	1–1	Value City Arena; Columbus, Ohio
Feb 19, 2005*		at Creighton; Bracket Buster	L 68–100	16–9	Qwest Center Omaha; Omaha, Nebraska
Southern Conference tournament
Mar 3, 2005*		East Tennessee State; Quarterfinals	W 77–70	18–10	McKenzie Arena; Chattanooga, Tennessee
Mar 4, 2005*		Appalachian State; Semifinals	W 57–51	19–10	McKenzie Arena; Chattanooga, Tennessee
Mar 5, 2005*		UNC Greensboro; Championship game	W 66–62	20–10	McKenzie Arena; Chattanooga, Tennessee
NCAA tournament
Mar 17, 2005*	(15 ABQ)	vs. (2 ABQ) No. 5 Wake Forest; First round	L 54–70	20–11	Wolstein Center; Cleveland, Ohio
*Non-conference game. ^{#}Rankings from AP Poll. (#) Tournament seedings in parentheses. All times are in Eastern Time.
