= Jim Boylen =

American basketball coach (born 1965)

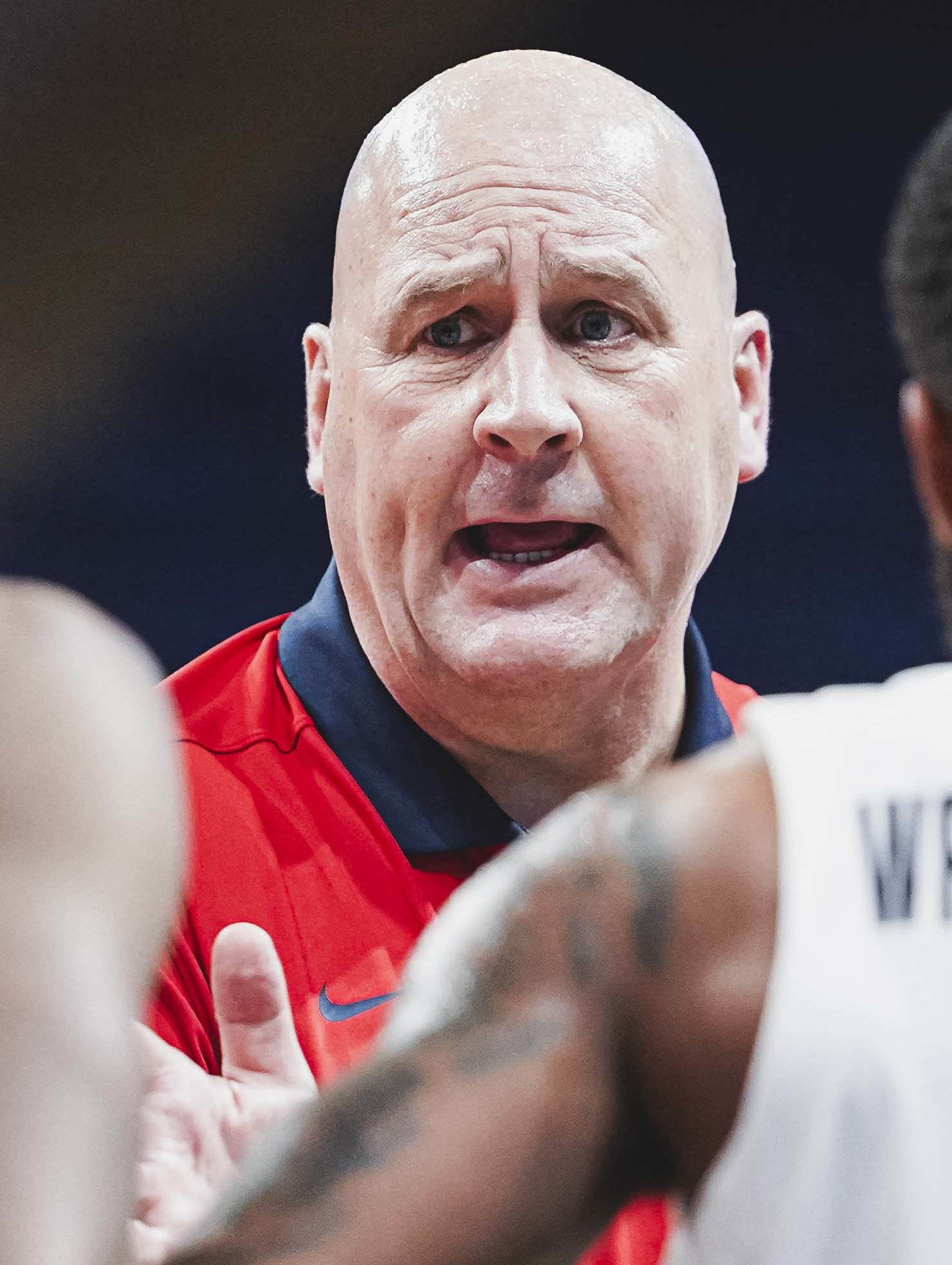
- Boylen as head coach of the United States men's national basketball team in 2022

Indiana Pacers
- Title: Assistant coach
- League: NBA

Personal information
- Born: April 18, 1965 (age 61) East Grand Rapids, Michigan, U.S.
- Listed height: 6 ft 2 in (1.88 m)

Career information
- High school: East Grand Rapids (East Grand Rapids, Michigan)
- College: Maine (1983–1987)
- Position: Guard
- Coaching career: 1987–present

Career history

Coaching
- 1987–1992: Michigan State (assistant)
- 1992–2003: Houston Rockets (assistant)
- 2003–2004: Golden State Warriors (assistant)
- 2004–2005: Milwaukee Bucks (assistant)
- 2005–2007: Michigan State (assistant)
- 2007–2011: Utah
- 2011–2013: Indiana Pacers (assistant)
- 2013–2015: San Antonio Spurs (assistant)
- 2015–2018: Chicago Bulls (assoc. HC)
- 2018–2020: Chicago Bulls
- 2023–present: Indiana Pacers (assistant)

Career highlights
- As coach: Mountain West tournament champion (2009); Mountain West Conference Regular Season (2009); As assistant coach: 3× NBA champion (1994, 1995, 2014)

James Francis Boylen (born April 18, 1965) is an American basketball coach who currently serves as an assistant coach for the Indiana Pacers of the National Basketball Association (NBA). Boylen previously served as the head coach for the Chicago Bulls from 2018 to 2020 before being fired on August 14, 2020 and the University of Utah from 2007 to 2011 before being fired on March 12, 2011. The Utah job was his first head coaching position after spending over a decade as an assistant at both the NBA and NCAA levels. He replaced Ray Giacoletti, who was fired from Utah on March 3, 2007. Prior to joining Utah, Boylen spent two years at Michigan State University (MSU) as assistant coach under Tom Izzo.

== College career ==
Boylen was born in East Grand Rapids, Michigan in 1965 and attended the University of Maine, where he was a captain during both his junior and senior seasons. As a senior, he earned First Team All-North Atlantic Conference honors after averaging 21 points per game. That same year, he finished runner-up in the conference Player of the Year voting to Northeastern's Reggie Lewis. Boylen earned a bachelor's degree in business from Maine in 1987.

== Coaching history ==
=== Early years ===
Boylen began his coaching career as an assistant under Michigan State head coach Jud Heathcote. He would stay there from 1987 to 1992 before accepting a position with the NBA's Houston Rockets, serving under Rudy Tomjanovich. As an assistant coach with the Rockets, Boylen would help coach the team to win two NBA championships. After his 11-year stint with Houston, Boylen became an assistant coach with the Golden State Warriors and then the Milwaukee Bucks. After 13 years of coaching in the NBA, he returned to Michigan State as an assistant with the Spartans. As Tom Izzo's top assistant, he helped lead Michigan State to a 45–23 record in two years, including two NCAA appearances.

=== University of Utah ===
On March 27, 2007, Boylen was named the head coach at the University of Utah.

In his first season, Boylen brought more consistency to the Utes, guiding them to their first winning record in two years and their first postseason berth since reaching the NCAA tournament in 2005. While there were some struggles, including two losses to BYU for the second consecutive year, Utah did manage to beat instate rival Utah State and earned a surprising victory on the road at Cal. The Utes also stunned New Mexico in the first round of the 2008 Mountain West tournament, all but killing the Lobos' chances of gaining an at-large berth to the NCAA Tournament. Boylen's Utes finished his inaugural season with an 18–15 mark, defeating UTEP in the first round of the 2008 College Basketball Invitational before losing to eventual champion Tulsa.

In his second season, Boylen turned the Utes into Mountain West Conference champions, guiding them to a 21–9 regular season record (12–4 in the Mountain West) and winning the conference tournament. The Utes were then given a fifth seed in the NCAA tournament but were upset by the Arizona squad with two future NBA players (Jordan Hill and Chase Budinger).

After graduating several key players from the 2008–09 team, Utah struggled in Boylen's third season, regressing to a losing record and finishing in the bottom-half of the Mountain West Conference. Their 17 losses marked their second worst total in the last 20 years with only the 2007 Utes having more on the season.

In Boylen's fourth season, the Utes went 13–18. The program fired him on March 12, 2011.

=== Indiana Pacers & San Antonio Spurs ===
On June 28, 2013, Boylen was hired by the San Antonio Spurs as an assistant coach for the 2013–14 season after serving the last 2 seasons with the Indiana Pacers. Boylen won his third NBA championship after the Spurs defeated the Miami Heat 4–1 in the 2014 NBA Finals.

On June 2, 2015, Boylen and David Vanterpool were named to Canada men's national basketball team.

=== Chicago Bulls ===
On June 17, 2015, Boylen was named associate head coach of the Chicago Bulls.

On December 3, 2018, the Bulls promoted Boylen to head coach when Fred Hoiberg was relieved of his duties after a 5–19 start to the 2018–19 season.

On August 14, 2020, the Bulls fired Boylen after a 39–84 record in two seasons without a playoff appearance. His .317 winning percentage was the second worst in franchise history (minimum 100 games) behind Tim Floyd (.205).

On October 20, 2021, the USA Basketball announced that Boylen had been selected head coach for USA Basketball World Cup qualifying team to play in November window.

=== Indiana Pacers (second stint) ===
On August 25, 2025, the Indiana Pacers promoted Boylen to the front of their bench under head coach Rick Carlisle.

== Head coaching record ==
Record table
Season	Team	Overall	Conference	Standing	Postseason
Utah Utes (Mountain West Conference) (2007–2011)
2007–08	Utah	18–15	7–9	6th	CBI 2nd Round
2008–09	Utah	24–10	12–4	T-1st	NCAA 1st Round
2009–10	Utah	14–17	7–9	T-5th	
2010–11	Utah	13–18	6–10	7th	
Utah:		69–60 (.535)	32–32 (.500)		
Total:		69–60 (.535)			
National champion Postseason invitational champion Conference regular season champion Conference regular season and conference tournament champion Division regular season champion Division regular season and conference tournament champion Conference tournament champion

=== NBA ===
Legend
Regular season	G	Games coached	W	Games won	L	Games lost	W–L %	Win–loss %
Playoffs	PG	Playoff games	PW	Playoff wins	PL	Playoff losses	PW–L %	Playoff win–loss %

Team	Year	G	W	L	W–L%	Finish	PG	PW	PL	PW–L%	Result
Chicago	2018–19	58	17	41	.293	5th in Central	—	—	—	—	Missed playoffs
Chicago	2019–20	65	22	43	.338	3rd in Central	—	—	—	—	Missed playoffs
Career		123	39	84	.317		—	—	—	—	
