= 2005 Southern Conference men's basketball tournament =

- Classification: Division I
- Season: 2004–05
- Teams: 12
- Site: McKenzie Arena; Chattanooga, Tennessee
- Champions: Chattanooga (9th title)
- Winning coach: John Shulman (1st title)
- MVP: Mindaugas Katelynas (Chattanooga)
- Top scorer: Tim Smith (East Tennessee State) (63 points)

2004–05 Southern Conference men's basketball standings
	Conf.				Overall
Team	W		L	PCT	W		L	PCT
North
Chattanooga †	10	–	6	.625	20	–	11	.645
UNC Greensboro	9	–	7	.563	18	–	12	.600
Appalachian State	9	–	7	.563	18	–	12	.600
Elon	5	–	11	.313	8	–	23	.258
East Tennessee State	4	–	12	.250	10	–	19	.345
Western Carolina	3	–	13	.188	8	–	22	.267
South
Davidson	16	–	0	1.000	23	–	9	.719
College of Charleston	10	–	6	.625	18	–	10	.643
Georgia Southern	10	–	6	.625	18	–	13	.581
Furman	9	–	7	.563	16	–	13	.552
Wofford	7	–	9	.438	14	–	14	.500
The Citadel	4	–	12	.250	12	–	16	.429
† SoCon Tournament winner As of April 30, 2005; Rankings from AP poll

The 2005 Southern Conference men's basketball tournament took place from March 2–5, 2005 at the McKenzie Arena in Chattanooga, Tennessee. The #2 seed Chattanooga Mocs defeated the UNC Greensboro Spartans in the championship game to win their ninth title in school history and receive the automatic berth to the 2005 NCAA tournament.

== Format ==
All twelve teams were eligible for the tournament. The tournament used a preset bracket consisting of four rounds, the first of which featured four games, with the winners moving on to the quarterfinal round. The top four teams in the tournament received first round byes, and the division winners were seeded first and second overall. This was the last season for East Tennessee State as a member of the conference.

== Bracket ==
First round March 2
8	Elon	64
9	Wofford	58
5	Georgia Southern	69
12	Western Carolina	57
7	Furman	84
10	East Tennessee State	87
6	Appalachian State	68
11	The Citadel	59

Quarterfinals; March 3
1	Davidson	67
8	Elon	53
4	UNC Greensboro	73
5	Georgia Southern	71
2	Chattanooga	77
10	East Tennessee State	70
3	College of Charleston	60
6	Appalachian State	63

Semifinals; March 4
1	Davidson	68
4	UNC Greensboro	73
2	Chattanooga	57
6	Appalachian State	51

Championship Game; March 5
2	Chattanooga	66
4	UNC Greensboro	62

* Overtime game

== See also ==
- List of Southern Conference men's basketball champions
