= 2008–09 Davidson Wildcats men's basketball team =

American college basketball season

2008–09 Davidson Wildcats men's basketball

Southern Conference regular season champions

NIT, second round
- Conference: Southern Conference
- South
- Record: 27–8 (18–2 SoCon)
- Head coach: Bob McKillop (20th season)
- Assistant coaches: Matt Matheny; Jim Fox; Matt McKillop
- Home arena: John M. Belk Arena

2008–09 Southern Conference men's basketball standings
	Conf.				Overall
Team	W		L	PCT	W		L	PCT
North
Western Carolina	11	–	9	.550	16	–	15	.516
Chattanooga †	11	–	9	.550	18	–	17	.514
Samford	9	–	11	.450	16	–	16	.500
Appalachian State	9	–	11	.450	13	–	18	.419
Elon	7	–	13	.350	11	–	20	.355
UNC Greensboro	4	–	16	.200	5	–	25	.167
South
Davidson	18	–	2	.900	27	–	8	.771
The Citadel	15	–	5	.750	20	–	13	.606
Charleston	15	–	5	.750	27	–	9	.750
Wofford	12	–	8	.600	16	–	14	.533
Georgia Southern	5	–	15	.250	8	–	22	.267
Furman	4	–	16	.200	6	–	24	.200
† SoCon Tournament winner As of April 30, 2009; Rankings from AP Poll

The 2008–09 Davidson Wildcats men's basketball team represented Davidson College in NCAA men's Division I competition. The Wildcats had emerged in recent years as a legitimate national power despite being a mid-major school with one of the smallest student bodies in the NCAA Division I. The team was given high expectations after advancing to the NCAA tournament Elite Eight in 2008.

This season was highlighted by the individual performance of Stephen Curry, who was the nation's leading scorer after switching from shooting guard to point guard. He averaged 28.6 points and 5.6 assists per game. Stephen also took the school record of career point-scorer from former All-American John Gerdy. After the season, Stephen announced his entry into the 2009 NBA Draft, ending his Davidson career.

The season ended on a disappointing note, as the Wildcats unexpectedly lost to College of Charleston in the SoCon Tournament semifinals, resulting in their omission from the NCAA basketball tournament. The Wildcats beat the South Carolina Gamecocks in the NIT before losing in the Round of 16 to Saint Mary's.

== Roster ==
Note: Flags indicate national team eligibility at FIBA sanctioned events. Players may hold other non-FIBA nationality not displayed.

No.		Position	Player
1	(United States)	PG	Brendan McKillop
4	(United States)	SG	Aaron Bond
12	(Turkey)	PG	Can Civi
14	(Canada)	SF	Max Paulhus Gosselin
20	(United States)	SG	Will Reigel
22	(Canada)	SF	Will Archambault
23	(United States)	PF	Steve Rossiter

No.		Position	Player
24	(United States)	SG	Bryant Barr
25	(United States)	SG	A.J Atkinson
30	(United States)	PG	Stephen Curry
34	(Nigeria)	PF	Frank Ben-Eze
35	(United States)	PF	Dan Nelms
41	(Nigeria)	PF	Andrew Lovedale
42	(England)	PF	Ben Allison

== Schedule and results ==
Date time, TV	Rank^{#}	Opponent^{#}	Result	Record	High points	High rebounds	High assists	Site city, state
Regular season
Nov 14, 2008	No. 20	Guilford	W 107–83	1–0	29 – Curry	7 – Rossiter	10 – Curry	John M. Belk Arena (5,223); Davidson, NC
Nov 17, 2008*	No. 21	vs. James Madison	W 99–64	2–0	33 – Curry	11 – Lovedale	9 – Curry	Lloyd Noble Center (9,625); Norman, OK
Nov 18, 2008*; 8:30 p.m., ESPN2	No. 21	at No. 12 Oklahoma	L 78–82	2–1	44 – Curry	8 – Lovedale	3 – Curry	Lloyd Noble Center (10,793); Norman, OK
Nov 21, 2008*	No. 21	Winthrop	W 97–70	3–1	30 – Curry	15 – Lovedale	13 – Curry	John M. Belk Arena (5,223); Davidson, NC
Nov 24, 2008*	No. 24	Florida Atlantic	W 76–60	4–1	39 – Curry	15 – Lovedale	4 – Curry	John M. Belk Arena (2,179); Davidson, NC
Nov 25, 2008*	No. 24	Loyola (MD)	W 78–48	5–1	20 – Lovedale	10 – Lovedale	6 – Rossiter	John M. Belk Arena (2,373); Davidson, NC
Dec 6, 2008*	No. 22	vs. NC State	W 72–67	6–1	44 – Curry	10 – Rossiter	3 – Curry	Time Warner Cable Arena (11,599); Charlotte, NC
Dec 9, 2008*	No. 23	vs. West Virginia	W 68–65	7–1	27 – Curry	6 – Rossiter	10 – Curry	Madison Square Garden (14,675); New York, NY
Dec 13, 2008*; 7:00 p.m.	No. 23	Chattanooga	W 100–95	8–1 (1–0)	41 – Curry	18 – Lovedale	6 – Curry	John M. Belk Arena (5,223); Davidson, NC
Dec 20, 2008*; 4:00 p.m., CBS	No. 22	vs. No. 13 Purdue; The Wooden Tradition	L 58–76	8–2	13 – Curry	8 – Curry	6 – Curry	Conseco Fieldhouse (12,754); Indianapolis, IN
Dec 29, 2008*		at College of Charleston	W 79–75	9–2 (2–0)	29 – Curry	8 – Rossiter	9 – Curry	Carolina First Arena (5,368); Charleston, SC
Jan 3, 2009*		Samford	W 76–55	10–2 (3–0)	21 – Curry	8 – Rossiter	8 – Curry	John M. Belk Arena (5,223); Davidson, NC
Jan 7, 2009*; 7:00 p.m., ESPN		at No. 2 Duke	L 67–79	10–3	29 – Curry	10 – Rossiter	6 – Curry	Cameron Indoor Stadium (9,314); Durham, NC
Jan 10, 2009*		at The Citadel	W 84–69	11–3 (4–0)	32 – Curry	6 – Tied	6 – Curry	McAlister Field House (5,336); Charleston, SC
Jan 12, 2009*		at Appalachian State	W 70–52	12–3 (5–0)	16 – Curry	6 – Paulhus Gosselin	6 – Curry	Holmes Convocation Center (8,350); Boone, NC
Jan 14, 2009*		Elon	W 83–68	13–3 (6–0)	39 – Curry	7 – Lovedale	4 – Curry	John M. Belk Arena (5,223); Davidson, NC
Jan 17, 2009*		at Georgia Southern	W 89–68	14–3 (7–0)	28 – Curry	15 – Lovedale	5 – Curry	Hanner Fieldhouse (4,360); Statesboro, GA
Jan 21, 2009*		Furman	W 83–43	15–3 (8–0)	30 – Curry	7 – Lovedale	5 – Curry	John M. Belk Arena (5,223); Davidson, NC
Jan 24, 2009*		Wofford	W 79–56	16–3 (9–0)	33 – Curry	7 – Curry	7 – Curry	John M. Belk Arena (5,223); Davidson, NC
Jan 28, 2009*		at Chattanooga	W 92–70	17–3 (10–0)	32 – Curry	11 – Lovedale	8 – Curry	McKenzie Arena (9,234); Chattanooga, TN
Jan 31, 2009*		at Samford	W 55–52	18–3 (11–0)	20 – Curry	12 – Lovedale	4 – Curry	Pete Hanna Center (5,116); Birmingham, AL
Feb 2, 2009*; 7:05 p.m.		Western Carolina	W 89–65	19–3 (12–0)	26 – Curry	8 – Curry	8 – Curry	John M. Belk Arena (5,223); Davidson, NC
Feb 5, 2009*		at UNC Greensboro	W 75–54	20–3 (13–0)	29 – Curry	13 – Rossiter	3 – Curry	Fleming Gymnasium (11,687); Greensboro, NC
Feb 7, 2009*; 6:05 p.m.		College of Charleston	L 75–77	20–4 (13–1)	25 – Curry	8 – Rossiter	4 – Curry	John M. Belk Arena (5,223); Davidson, NC
Feb 12, 2009*		at Wofford	W 78–61	21–4 (14–1)	39 – Curry	9 – Lovedale	3 – Curry	Benjamin Johnson Arena (3,500); Spartanburg, SC
Feb 14, 2009*; 4:00 p.m.		at Furman	W 75–60	22–4 (15–1)	25 – Curry	11 – Rossiter	4 – Rossiter	Timmons Arena (2,595); Greenville, SC
Feb 18, 2009*; 7:05 p.m.		The Citadel	L 46–64	22–5 (15–2)	16 – Lovedale	11 – Lovedale	2 – Rossiter	John M. Belk Arena (5,223); Davidson, NC
Feb 21, 2009*; 12:03 p.m.		No. 21 Butler; BracketBusters	L 63–75	22–6	20 – Curry	7 – Tied	6 – Curry	John M. Belk Arena (5,223); Davidson, NC
Feb 25, 2009*; 7:05 p.m.		UNC Greensboro	W 70–49	23–6 (16–2)	20 – Curry	10 – Curry	5 – Curry	John M. Belk Arena (5,223); Davidson, NC
Feb 28, 2009*; 2:05 p.m.		Georgia Southern	W 99–56	24–6 (17–2)	34 – Curry	12 – Ben-Eze	6 – Curry	John M. Belk Arena (5,223); Davidson, NC
Mar 2, 2009*; 7:00 p.m.		at Elon	W 90–78	25–6 (18–2)	26 – Curry	9 – Lovedale	5 – Curry	Alumni Gym (1,710); Elon, NC
SoCon Tournament
Mar 7, 2009*; 2:10 p.m.		vs. Appalachian State	W 84–68	26–6	43 – Curry	14 – Lovedale	7 – McKillop	McKenzie Arena (4,542); Chattanooga, TN
Mar 8, 2009*; 6:00 p.m.		vs. College of Charleston	L 52–59	26–7	20 – Curry	10 – Archambault	3 – Curry	McKenzie Arena (5,497); Chattanooga, TN
National Invitation Tournament
Mar 17, 2009*; 7:00 p.m., ESPN2		at South Carolina; First round	W 70–63	27–7	32 – Curry	9 – Lovedale	3 – Curry	Colonial Life Arena (7,251); Columbia, SC
Mar 23, 2009*; 8:40 p.m.		at Saint Mary's; Second Round	L 68–80	27–8	26 – Curry	10 – Lovedale	5 – Curry	McKeon Pavilion (3,500); Moraga, CA
*Non-conference game. ^{#}Rankings from AP. (#) Tournament seedings in parentheses. All times are in Eastern.

== Rankings ==
Ranking movements Legend: ██ Increase in ranking ██ Decrease in ranking — = Not ranked
	Week																			
Poll	Pre	1	2	3	4	5	6	7	8	9	10	11	12	13	14	15	16	17	18	Final
AP	20	21	24	22	23	22	—	—	—	—	—	—	—	—	—	—	—	—	—	Not released
Coaches	20	21	25	24	22	20	—	—	—	—	—	—	—	—	—	—	—	—	—	—

== Awards and honors ==
- Stephen Curry – National Scoring Leader, Consensus First-team All-American, SoCon Player of the Year

== Team players in the 2009 NBA draft ==
Round	Pick	Player	NBA club
1	7	Stephen Curry	Golden State Warriors
