= 2008–09 The Citadel Bulldogs basketball team =

American college basketball season

2008–09 The Citadel Bulldogs men's basketball
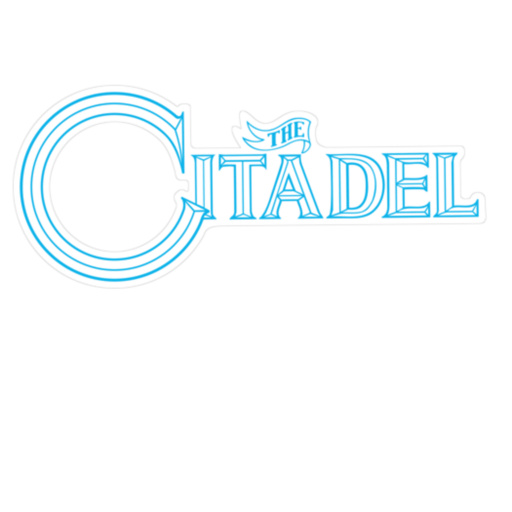

CollegeInsider.com First Round vs. ODU, L, 59–67
- Conference: Southern Conference
- South Division
- Record: 20–13 (15–5 SoCon)
- Head coach: Ed Conroy
- Home arena: McAlister Field House

2008–09 Southern Conference men's basketball standings
	Conf.				Overall
Team	W		L	PCT	W		L	PCT
North
Western Carolina	11	–	9	.550	16	–	15	.516
Chattanooga †	11	–	9	.550	18	–	17	.514
Samford	9	–	11	.450	16	–	16	.500
Appalachian State	9	–	11	.450	13	–	18	.419
Elon	7	–	13	.350	11	–	20	.355
UNC Greensboro	4	–	16	.200	5	–	25	.167
South
Davidson	18	–	2	.900	27	–	8	.771
The Citadel	15	–	5	.750	20	–	13	.606
Charleston	15	–	5	.750	27	–	9	.750
Wofford	12	–	8	.600	16	–	14	.533
Georgia Southern	5	–	15	.250	8	–	22	.267
Furman	4	–	16	.200	6	–	24	.200
† SoCon Tournament winner As of April 30, 2009; Rankings from AP Poll

The 2008–09 The Citadel Bulldogs basketball team represented The Citadel, The Military College of South Carolina in the 2008-09 NCAA Division I men's basketball season. The Bulldogs were led by third year head coach Ed Conroy and played their home games at McAlister Field House. They played as members of the Southern Conference, as they have since 1936.

The Bulldogs won 20 games for just the second time in school history, and finished tied with archrival College of Charleston for second in the SoCon South Division. They also made their first postseason appearance, earning an invitation to the 2009 CollegeInsider.com Postseason Tournament, where they were eliminated in the first round by eventual champion Old Dominion.

== Schedule ==
Date time, TV	Opponent	Result	Record	Site (attendance) city, state
Exhibition
November 9*	Georgia Southwestern State	W 69–68		McAlister Field House; Charleston, SC
Regular Season
November 14	Grace Bible	W 81–72	1–0	McAlister Field House; Charleston, SC
November 16*	at VCU	L 59–82	1–1	Stuart C. Siegel Center (5,123); Richmond, VA
November 20*	Iowa	L 48–70	1–2	McAlister Field House (2,024); Charleston, SC
November 22*	Cincinnati Christian	W 78–55	2–2	McAlister Field House; Charleston, SC
November 25*	at Charleston Southern	W 84–80	3–2	North Charleston Coliseum (2,085); North Charleston, SC
November 29*	vs. Central Arkansas; Cancún Challenge	L 53–58	3–3	Moon Palace Golf & Spa Resort; Cancún, Mexico
November 30*	vs. Grambling; Cancún Challenge	W 55–41	4–3	Moon Palace Golf & Spa Resort; Cancún, Mexico
December 4	at UNC Greenbsoro	W 57–50	5–3 (1–0)	Greensboro Coliseum (1,127); Greensboro, NC
December 6	at Elon	L 54–56	5–4 (1–1)	Alumni Gym (1,076); Elon, NC
December 15*	UC Davis	L 61–79	5–5	McAlister Field House (1,022); Charleston, SC
December 17*	at No. 19 Michigan State	L 65–79	5–6	Breslin Center (14,759); East Lansing, MI
December 20*	at South Carolina	L 66–80	5–7	Colonial Life Arena (9,493); Columbia, SC
January 3*	Bethune-Cookman	W 58–57	6–7	McAlister Field House (837); Charleston, SC
January 8	Georgia Southern	W 84–75	7–7 (2–1)	McAlister Field House (845); Charleston, SC
January 10	Davidson	L 69–84	7–8 (2–2)	McAlister Field House (5,336); Charleston, SC
January 12	Chattanooga	L 70–76	7–9 (2–3)	McAlister Field House (1,326); Charleston, SC
January 15	at Furman	W 74–69 ^{OT}	8–9 (3–3)	Timmons Arena (1,638); Greenville, SC
January 17	at Wofford	L 63–66	8–10 (3–4)	Benjamin Johnson Arena (1,327); Spartanburg, SC
January 22	Western Carolina	W 66–52	9–10 (4–4)	McAlister Field House (1,133); Charleston, SC
January 24	College of Charleston	W 72–63	10–10 (5–4)	McAlister Field House (5,107); Charleston, SC
January 26	at Samford	W 70–45	11–10 (6–4)	Pete Hanna Center (1,211); Homewood, AL
January 29	Elon	W 60–58	12–10 (7–4)	McAlister Field House (1,412); Charleston, SC
January 31	UNC Greensboro	W 66–60	13–10 (8–4)	McAlister Field House (1,640); Charleston, SC
February 5	at Appalachian State	W 74–72	14–10 (9–4)	Holmes Center (1,227); Boone, NC
February 7	at Western Carolina	W 75–66	15–10 (10–4)	Ramsey Center (1,503); Cullowhee, NC
February 12	Appalachian State	W 78–73 ^{OT}	16–10 (11–4)	McAlister Field House (2,178); Charleston, SC
February 14	at College of Charleston	W 72–58	17–10 (12–4)	Carolina First Arena (5,168); Charleston, SC
February 18	at Davidson	W 64–46	18–10 (13–4)	John M. Belk Arena (5,223); Davidson, NC
February 26	Furman	W 75–54	19–10 (14–4)	McAlister Field House (4,219); Charleston, SC
February 28	Wofford	L 55–62	19–11 (14–5)	McAlister Field House (4,485); Charleston, SC
March 2	at Georgia Southern	W 74–53	20–11 (15–5)	Hanner Fieldhouse (1,704); Statesboro, GA
2009 Southern Conference men's basketball tournament
March 6	vs. Samford	L 67–76	20–12	McKenzie Arena (4,560); Chattanooga, TN
2009 CollegeInsider.com Postseason Tournament
March 19*	Old Dominion	L 59–67	20–13	Constant Convocation Center (2,157); Norfolk, VA
*Non-conference game. (#) Tournament seedings in parentheses. All times are in Eastern Time.
