= 2009 NAIA Division I women's basketball tournament =

- Teams: 32
- Finals site: Oman Arena, Jackson, Tennessee
- Champions: Union University Bulldogs (4th title, 6th title game, 10th Fab Four)
- Runner-up: Lambuth Eagles (2nd title game, 2nd Fab Four)
- Semifinalists: Oklahoma Baptist Bison (1st Fab Four); Oklahoma City Stars (9th Fab Four)
- Coach of the year: Mark Campbell (Union (TN))
- Player of the year: Josephine Owino (Union (TN))
- Charles Stevenson Hustle Award: Chytearra Kintchen (Lambuth)
- Chuck Taylor MVP: Josephine Owino (Union (TN))
- Top scorer: Jana Cross (Freed–Hardeman) (57 points)

The 2009 NAIA Division I women's basketball tournament was the tournament held by the NAIA to determine the national champion of women's college basketball among its Division I members in the United States and Canada for the 2008–09 basketball season.

Union (TN) defeated Lambuth in the championship game, 73–63, to claim the Bulldogs' fourth NAIA national title and first since 2006.

The tournament was played at the Oman Arena in Jackson, Tennessee.

== Qualification ==
The tournament field remained fixed at thirty-two teams, which were sorted into one of four quadrants and seeded from 1 to 8 within each quadrant.

The tournament continued to utilize a simple single-elimination format.

== Bracket ==
First round
1	Oklahoma Baptist	57
8	LSU Shreveport	39
5	Columbia (MO)	64
4	Campbellsville	60
3	Trevecca Nazarene	57
6	Biola	65
7	Evangel	62
2	Lee (TN)	63
2	Point Loma Nazarene	51
7	Auburn Montgomery	38
6	William Woods	51
3	Lubbock Christian	57
5	Lindsey Wilson	63
4	Westmont	51
8	Jarvis Christian	58
1	Union (TN)	86
1	Vanguard	72
8	Berry	51
5	Loyola New Orleans	47
4	Westminster (UT)	62
3	Oklahoma City	74
6	Bethel (TN)	72
7	Langston	60
2	Saint Xavier	71
2	Freed–Hardeman	73
7	Wayland Baptist	57
6	Lewis–Clark State	54
3	Cumberlands (KY)	76
4	Southern Nazarene	55
5	Azusa Pacific	65
8	William Jewell	59
1	Lambuth	82

Second round
1	Oklahoma Baptist	81
5	Columbia (MO)	52
6	Biola	75
2	Lee (TN)	96
2	Point Loma Nazarene	82
3	Lubbock Christian	74
5	Lindsey Wilson	59
1	Union (TN)	80
1	Vanguard	80
4	Westminster (UT)	71
3	Oklahoma City	72
2	Saint Xavier	68
2	Freed–Hardeman	99
3	Cumberlands (KY)	105**
5	Azusa Pacific	70
1	Lambuth	73

Quarterfinals
1	Oklahoma Baptist	70
Lee (TN)	54
2	Point Loma Nazarene	59
1	Union (TN)	69
1	Vanguard	68
Oklahoma City	83
3	Cumberlands (KY)	54
1	Lambuth	66

Semifinals
1	Oklahoma Baptist	48
1	Union (TN)	73
Oklahoma City	63
1	Lambuth	65

National championship
1	Union (TN)	73
1	Lambuth	63

== See also ==
- 2009 NAIA Division I men's basketball tournament
- 2009 NCAA Division I women's basketball tournament
- 2009 NCAA Division II women's basketball tournament
- 2009 NCAA Division III women's basketball tournament
- 2009 NAIA Division II women's basketball tournament
