= 2008–09 BYU Cougars men's basketball team =

American college basketball season

2008–09 BYU Cougars men's basketball

Mountain West Regular Season Co–Champions

NCAA tournament, first round
- Conference: Mountain West Conference
- Record: 25–8 (12–4 Mountain West)
- Head coach: Dave Rose
- Assistant coaches: Dave Rice; John Wardenburg; Terry Nashif
- Home arena: Marriott Center

2008–09 Mountain West Conference men's basketball standings
	Conf.				Overall
Team	W		L	PCT	W		L	PCT
BYU	12	–	4	.750	25	–	8	.758
No. 25 Utah †	12	–	4	.750	25	–	10	.714
New Mexico	12	–	4	.750	22	–	12	.647
San Diego State	11	–	5	.688	26	–	10	.722
UNLV	9	–	7	.563	21	–	11	.656
Wyoming	7	–	9	.438	19	–	14	.576
TCU	5	–	11	.313	14	–	17	.452
Colorado State	4	–	12	.250	9	–	22	.290
Air Force	0	–	16	.000	10	–	21	.323
† Mountain West tournament winner As of April 1, 2009; Rankings from AP Poll

The 2008–09 BYU Cougars men's basketball team represented Brigham Young University in the 2008–09 college basketball season. This was head coach Dave Rose's fourth season at BYU. The Cougars competed in the Mountain West Conference and played their home games at the Marriott Center.

== Roster ==
#	Name	Height	Weight (lbs.)	Position	Class	Hometown	Previous Team(s)			
1	Charles Abouo	6'5"	210	G/F	Fr.	Abidjan		Côte d'Ivoire	(Ivory Coast)	Brewster Academy
2	Lamont Morgan Jr.	5'10"	170	G	Jr.	Pomona, California	(California)	United States	(United States)	Diamond Ranch HS; Saddleback CC
4	Jackson Emery	6'3"	185	G	So.	Alpine, Utah	(Utah)	United States	(United States)	Lone Peak HS
5	Archie Rose	6'5"	210	G	Sr.	Nassau		Bahamas	(The Bahamas)	Lee College
15	James Anderson	6'10"	230	F/C	Fr.	Page, Arizona	(Arizona)	United States	(United States)	Page HS
20	Matt Pinegar	6'0"	190	G	Fr.	Provo, Utah	(Utah)	United States	(United States)	Timpview HS
30	Lee Cummard	6'7"	190	G	Sr.	Mesa, Arizona	(Arizona)	United States	(United States)	Mesa HS
32	Jimmer Fredette	6'2"	195	G	So.	Glens Falls, New York	(New York (state))	United States	(United States)	Glens Falls HS
34	Noah Hartsock	6'8"	215	F	Fr.	Bartlesville, Oklahoma	(Oklahoma)	United States	(United States)	Bartlesville HS
35	Michael Boswell	6'9"	215	F	Fr.	Aloha, Oregon	(Oregon)	United States	(United States)	Aloha HS
45	Jonathan Tavernari	6'6"	215	G/F	Jr.	São Bernardo do Campo	(São Paulo (state))	Brazil	(Brazil)	Bishop Gorman HS
53	Gavin MacGregor	6'10"	240	F/C	Sr.	Ridgecrest, California	(California)	United States	(United States)	Burroughs HS
54	Chris Miles	6'11"	235	F/C	Jr.	Provo, Utah	(Utah)	United States	(United States)	Timpview HS

== Schedule and results ==
- All times are Mountain

Date time, TV	Rank^{#}	Opponent^{#}	Result	Record	Site (attendance) city, state
Exhibition
11/06/2008*; 7:05pm, BYU TV		Concordia	W 96–54		Marriott Center (7,223); Provo, UT
11/11/2008*; 7:30pm, BYU TV		Georgetown College	W 80–53		Marriott Center (7,302); Provo, UT
Regular Season
11/14/2008*; 7:05pm		Long Beach State	W 75–65	1–0	Marriott Center (15,753); Provo, UT
11/18/2008*; 8:05pm		at Pepperdine	W 82–53	2–0	Firestone Fieldhouse (1,642); Malibu, CA
11/20/2008*; 7:30pm, BYU TV		North Florida; Basketball Travelers Invitational	W 74–41	3–0	Marriott Center (7,778); Provo, UT
11/21/2008*; 8:30pm, BYU TV		Rice; Basketball Travelers Invitational	W 83–52	4–0	Marriott Center (9,277); Provo, Utah
11/22/2009*; 8:30pm, BYU TV		Cal Poly; Basketball Travelers Invitational	W 76–64	5–0	Marriott Center (7,782); Provo, UT
11/29/2008*; 7:05pm, BYU TV		at Idaho State	W 85–65	6–0	Holt Arena (4,374); Pocatello, ID
12/03/2008*; 7:05pm, BYU TV/KJZZ		at Weber State; Old Oquirrh Bucket	W 92–62	7–0	Dee Events Center (5,672); Ogden, UT
12/6/2008*; 5:07pm, BYU TV/KJZZ		vs. Utah State; Oquirrh Bucket Battle	W 68–63	8–0	EnergySolutions Arena (13,890); Salt Lake City, UT
12/10/2008*; 8:05pm, The Mtn.		Boise State	W 94–56	9–0	Marriott Center (10,506); Provo, UT
12/13/2008*; 8:05pm, The Mtn.		Portland	W 91–76	10–0	Marriott Center (9,418); Provo, UT
12/20/2008*; 2:30pm, FSN		vs. No. 20 Arizona State; Stadium Shootout	L 75–76	10–1	University of Phoenix Stadium (10,431); Glendale, AZ
12/30/2008*; 7:05pm, CBSCS		at Tulsa	W 74–68	11–1	Reynolds Center (5,545); Tulsa, OK
01/03/2009*; 6:05pm, The Mtn.		No. 6 Wake Forest	L 87–94	11–2	Marriott Center (23,096); Provo, UT
01/06/2009*; 7:35pm		Western Oregon	W 85–64	12–2	Marriott Center (8,885); Provo, UT
01/10/2009; 1:00pm, The Mtn.		at Colorado State	W 86–60	13–2 (1–0)	Moby Arena (2,958); Fort Collins, CO
01/13/2009; 8:05pm, The Mtn.		TCU	W 73–61	14–2 (2–0)	Marriott Center (11,065); Provo, Utah
01/17/2009; 2:00pm, Versus		at New Mexico	L 62–81	14–3 (2–1)	University Arena (15,277); Albuquerque, NM
01/21/2009; 8:05pm, CBSCS		UNLV	L 70–76	14–4 (2–2)	Marriott Center (12,853); Provo, UT
01/24/2009; 7:05pm, The Mtn.		San Diego State	W 77–71	15–4 (3–2)	Marriott Center (13,871); Provo, UT
01/27/2009; 6:05pm, The Mtn.		at Utah; Old Oquirrh Bucket	L 88–94 ^{OT}	15–5 (3–3)	Huntsman Center (12,250); Salt Lake City, UT
01/31/2009; 4:05pm, The Mtn.		Wyoming	W 84–60	16–5 (4–3)	Marriott Center (16,347); Provo, UT
02/03/2009; 6:05pm, The Mtn.		at Air Force	W 71–50	17–5 (5–3)	Clune Arena (2,743); Colorado Springs, CO
02/11/2009; 6:05pm, The Mtn.		Colorado State	W 94–60	18–5 (6–3)	Marriott Center (11,772); Provo, UT
02/14/2009; 7:05pm, The Mtn.		at TCU	W 79–63	19–5 (7–3)	Daniel-Meyer Coliseum (4,807); Fort Worth, TX
02/17/2009; 8:05pm, The Mtn.		New Mexico	W 73–62	20–5 (8–3)	Marriott Center (12,911); Provo, Utah
02/21/2009; 9:00pm, CBS C		at UNLV	L 75–74	20–6 (8–4)	Thomas & Mack Center (18,523); Paradise, NV
02/24/2009; 8:35pm, The Mtn.		at San Diego State	W 69–59	21–6 (9–4)	Cox Arena (9,631); San Diego, CA
02/28/2009; 3:06pm, CBSCS		Utah; Old Oquirrh Bucket	W 63–50	22–6 (10–4)	Marriott Center (20,120); Provo, UT
03/04/2009; 7:05pm, The Mtn.		at Wyoming	W 78–68	23–6 (11–4)	Arena-Auditorium (6,749); Laramie, WY
03/07/2009; 7:05pm, The Mtn.		Air Force	W 54–49	24–6 (12–4)	Marriott Center (22,700); Provo, UT
Mountain West Conference Tournament
03/12/2009; 12:00pm, The Mtn.	No. 25	vs. Air Force; Quarterfinals	W 80–69	25–6	Thomas & Mack Center; Paradise, NV
03/13/2009; 6:00pm, CBSCS	No. 25	vs. San Diego State	L 62–64	25–7	Thomas & Mack Center; Paradise, NV
NCAA Tournament
03/19/2009*; 10:30am, CBS		vs. Texas A&M; First Round	L 66–79	25–8	Wachovia Center; Philadelphia, PA
*Non-conference game. ^{#}Rankings from AP Poll. (#) Tournament seedings in parentheses.

== Rankings ==
Ranking movements Legend: ██ Increase in ranking ██ Decrease in ranking — = Not ranked RV = Received votes
	Week																			
Poll	Pre	1	2	3	4	5	6	7	8	9	10	11	12	13	14	15	16	17	18	Final
AP	RV	RV	RV	RV	RV	RV	RV	RV	RV	RV	—	—	—	—	RV	RV	RV	25	RV	Not released
Coaches	RV	RV	RV	RV	RV	RV	RV	RV	RV	RV	RV	RV	RV	RV	RV	RV	RV	RV	RV	—

*AP does not release post-NCAA Tournament rankings.
