= City Championship =

American college basketball rivalry

- San Diego Toreros San Diego State Aztecs
- Sport: Men's basketball
- First meeting: December 8, 1962; San Diego State 68, San Diego 49
- Latest meeting: December 7, 2024; San Diego State 74, San Diego 57

Statistics
- Total meetings: 52
- All-time series: San Diego State leads, 33–19
- Largest victory: San Diego, 73–45 (1999); San Diego State, 77–49 (2010)
- Longest win streak: San Diego State, 9 (2006–2014)
- Current win streak: San Diego State, 2 (2019–present)

Locations of San Diego and San Diego State

The City Championship is an American men's college basketball rivalry game between the Aztecs of San Diego State University (SDSU) and the Toreros of the University of San Diego (USD). The winner of the game becomes City Champions.

== Background ==
Founded in 1897, San Diego State University (SDSU) is a public research university in the California State University system. The San Diego State Aztecs men's basketball team is a member of the Mountain West Conference. The University of San Diego (USD), founded in 1949, is a private, Roman Catholic university, whose Toreros men's basketball team is a member of the West Coast Conference.

== History ==
The first game between SDSU and USD was in the 1962–63 college basketball season. SDSU won 68-49 at home in Peterson Gym. USD's first win in the series was on January 22, 1965, an 89-85 victory at Peterson Gym.

The series has been played most recently annually since the 1998–99 season, on a home-and-home basis alternating between the SDSU Cox Arena (now Viejas Arena) in seasons beginning with even years and the USD Sports Center (now Jenny Craig Pavilion) in seasons beginning with odd years. By the 2014–15 season, SDSU had won 9 consecutive games in the series, the longest win streak in the series.

The 2015 matchup took place on neutral ground at Petco Park, home of the San Diego Padres, as part of the first ever Bill Walton Basketball Festival. The City Championship game was played on December 6, 2015 after a week of events including high school contests, corporate play, and physical education classes. The hardwood court was placed between home plate and third base, additional seating was added on the north and east sides of the court. The Toreros had a strong first half, outscoring the Aztecs 31–13. In the second half, the Aztecs came back strong, but the Toreros were able to hold on for a final 53–48 score.

=== Game Results ===
| San Diego victories | San Diego State victories | Tie games | Vacated wins |

| No. | Date | Location | Winner | Score |
|---|---|---|---|---|
| 1 | December 8, 1962 | San Diego, CA | San Diego State | 68–49 |
| 2 | December 6, 1963 | San Diego, CA | San Diego State | 70–69 |
| 3 | January 22, 1965 | San Diego, CA | San Diego | 89–85^{2OT} |
| 4 | December 16, 1965 | San Diego, CA | San Diego | 54–47 |
| 5 | December 15, 1966 | San Diego, CA | San Diego State | 55–50^{OT} |
| 6 | December 9, 1967 | San Diego, CA | San Diego State | 69–59 |
| 7 | February 20, 1969 | San Diego, CA | San Diego | 72–65 |
| 8 | February 3, 1970 | San Diego, CA | San Diego State | 70–67 |
| 9 | January 26, 1971 | San Diego, CA | San Diego State | 97–82 |
| 10 | January 25, 1972 | San Diego, CA | San Diego State | 87–69 |
| 11 | February 27, 1973 | San Diego, CA | San Diego | 78–67 |
| 12 | February 25, 1975 | San Diego, CA | San Diego State | 84–61 |
| 13 | December 19, 1975 | San Diego, CA | San Diego State | 78–62 |
| 14 | December 8, 1976 | San Diego, CA | San Diego | 67–63 |
| 15 | December 4, 1979 | San Diego, CA | San Diego State | 67–58^{OT} |
| 16 | December 2, 1980 | San Diego, CA | San Diego State | 60–52 |
| 17 | December 10, 1981 | San Diego, CA | San Diego State | 41–36 |
| 18 | December 9, 1982 | San Diego, CA | San Diego State | 47–45 |
| 19 | January 5, 1984 | San Diego, CA | San Diego State | 61–47 |
| 20 | December 6, 1984 | San Diego, CA | San Diego State | 57–53 |
| 21 | December 14, 1985 | San Diego, CA | San Diego | 81–64 |
| 22 | December 11, 1986 | San Diego, CA | San Diego | 83–67 |
| 23 | December 19, 1987 | San Diego, CA | San Diego | 76–53 |
| 24 | December 6, 1989 | San Diego, CA | San Diego State | 85–75 |
| 25 | November 27, 1990 | San Diego, CA | San Diego | 75–74 |
| 26 | November 22, 1991 | San Diego, CA | San Diego | 60–57 |
| 27 | December 1, 1992 | San Diego, CA | San Diego | 85–60 |
| 28 | December 2, 1995 | San Diego, CA | San Diego | 69–65 |
| 29 | December 8, 1996 | San Diego, CA | San Diego State | 87–70 |
| 30 | December 19, 1998 | San Diego, CA | San Diego | 52–51 |
| 31 | December 4, 1999 | San Diego, CA | San Diego | 73–45 |
| 32 | December 9, 2000 | San Diego, CA | San Diego | 55–52 |
| 33 | December 5, 2001 | San Diego, CA | San Diego | 72–67 |
| 34 | January 8, 2003 | San Diego, CA | San Diego State | 78–72 |
| 35 | December 3, 2003 | San Diego, CA | San Diego State | 66–63 |
| 36 | December 1, 2004 | San Diego, CA | San Diego State | 83–63 |
| 37 | November 30, 2005 | San Diego, CA | San Diego | 90–80 |
| 38 | November 29, 2006 | San Diego, CA | San Diego State | 79–76 |
| 39 | November 19, 2007 | San Diego, CA | San Diego State | 69–64 |
| 40 | December 6, 2008 | San Diego, CA | San Diego State | 57–46 |
| 41 | December 2, 2009 | San Diego, CA | San Diego State | 69–62^{OT} |
| 42 | December 11, 2010 | San Diego, CA | No. 14 San Diego State | 77–49 |
| 43 | December 7, 2011 | San Diego, CA | San Diego State | 74–62 |
| 44 | December 15, 2012 | San Diego, CA | No. 18 San Diego State | 72–56 |
| 45 | December 5, 2013 | San Diego, CA | No. 24 San Diego State | 65–64 |
| 46 | December 4, 2014 | San Diego, CA | No. 13 San Diego State | 57–48 |
| 47 | December 6, 2015 | San Diego, CA | San Diego | 53–48 |
| 48 | November 11, 2016 | San Diego, CA | San Diego State | 69–59 |
| 49 | November 30, 2017 | San Diego, CA | San Diego State | 66–57 |
| 50 | December 5, 2018 | San Diego, CA | San Diego | 73–61 |
| 51 | November 20, 2019 | San Diego, CA | San Diego State | 66–49 |
| 52 | December 7, 2024 | San Diego, CA | No. 24 San Diego State | 74–57 |
Series: San Diego State leads 33–19
