= 2009 NAIA Division I men's basketball tournament =

College basketball tournament

- Teams: 32
- Finals site: Municipal Auditorium; Kansas City, Missouri
- Champions: Rocky Mountain College (1st title)
- Runner-up: Columbia College (1st title game)
- Semifinalists: Robert Morris College (4th Final Four); MidAmerica Nazarene University (1st Final Four)
- Coach of the year: Bill Dreikosen (Rocky Mountain)
- Player of the year: Geoff Payne (Westminster (Ut.))
- Charles Stevenson Hustle Award: Nate Richardson (Rocky Mountain)
- Chuck Taylor MVP: Devin Uskoski (Rocky Mountain)
- Attendance: 38,502

The 72nd Buffalo Funds - NAIA Men's Division I Basketball Tournament was held from March 18 to 24 at Municipal Auditorium in Kansas City, Missouri. The 72nd annual NAIA basketball tournament featured 32 teams playing in a single-elimination format. The Heart of America Athletic Conference was the host conference for the tournament. This was the Heart of America Athletic Conference's first year as a Division I conference.

The tournament got off to a surprising start, as five higher seeded teams lost on the opening day, including top-seeded Rogers State, who lost to William Jewell, who had only qualified for the tournament by receiving the Heart of America Athletic Conference's host bid into the field.

In the end, two unseeded teams, Rocky Mountain College of Montana and Columbia College of Missouri—neither of whom had ever won a game at the tournament prior to 2009—met in the championship game, having each disposed of three higher-ranked teams along the way. Rocky Mountain won the championship with a 77-61 victory, claiming Rocky's first national basketball title.

== Awards and honors ==
- Leading scorer: Eric Palm, McKendree (IL)
- Leading rebounder: Devin Uskoski, Rocky Mountain (MT)
- Chuck Taylor Most Valuable Player: Devin Uskoski, Rocky Mountain (MT)
- Most consecutive tournament appearances: 18th, Georgetown (KY)
- Most tournament appearances: Georgetown (KY), 28th of 30, appearances to the NAIA Tournament
- Oklahoma Baptist won their 49th tournament game, tying them with Georgetown College (KY) for the most tournament wins all-time.

== 2009 NAIA bracket ==
First round March 18, 19	Second round March 20
1	Rogers State (Okla.)	73
-	William Jewell (Mo.)	76
-	William Jewell	67
-	Auburn-Montgomery	83
-	Auburn-Montgomery (Ala.)	72
16	Cumberland (Tenn.)	62
TOP TIER; March 18
9	Fresno Pacific (Calif.)	67
-	Tougaloo (Miss.)	69
-	Tougaloo	69
8	Robert Morris	89
-	Montana State-Northern	73
8	Robert Morris (Ill.)	76*
5	Mountain State (W. Va.)	88
-	LSU-Shreveport	76
5	Mountain State	79
12	Concordia	85
-	Oklahoma Christian	55
12	Concordia (Calif.)	70
TOP TIER; March 19
13	Freed-Hardeman (Tenn.)	77
-	Rocky Mountain (Mont.)	78*
-	Rocky Mountain	71
-	Central Methodist	62
-	Central Methodist (Mo.)	73
4	Georgetown (Ky.)	64
3	Union (Tenn.)	82
-	Science and Arts (Okla.)	63
3	Union	64
-	Columbia	83
-	Columbia (Mo.)	72
14	Lee (Tenn.)	69
BOTTOM TIER; March 18
11	Cumberlands (Ky.)	81
-	Jarvis Christian (Texas)	65
11	Cumberlands	62
6	Westminster	67
-	Biola (Calif.)	63
6	Westminster (Utah)	68*
7	McKendree (Ill.)	83
-	Northwestern Oklahoma State	58
7	McKendree	87
10	Texas Wesleyan	75
-	Lindsey Wilson (Ky.)	69
10	Texas Wesleyan	75
BOTTOM TIER; March 19
15	Azusa Pacific (Calif.)	72
-	MidAmerica Nazarene (Kan.)	78
-	MidAmerica Nazarene	64
2	Oklahoma Baptist	63
-	Life (Ga.)	81
2	Oklahoma Baptist	90

Elite Eight; March 21
-	Auburn-Montgomery	76
8	Robert Morris	87
12	Concordia	64
-	Rocky Mountain	72
-	Columbia	50
6	Westminster	47
7	McKendree	55
-	MidAmerica Nazarene	59

NAIA national semifinals March 23
8	Robert Morris	70
-	Rocky Mountain	75
-	Columbia	60
-	MidAmerica Nazarene	56

NAIA national championship March 24
-	Rocky Mountain	77
-	Columbia	61

- * denotes overtime.

== See also ==
- 2009 NAIA Division I women's basketball tournament
- 2009 NCAA Division I men's basketball tournament
- 2009 NCAA Division II men's basketball tournament
- 2009 NCAA Division III men's basketball tournament
- 2009 NAIA Division II men's basketball tournament
