= 2009 NCAA Division II women's basketball tournament =

- Teams: 64
- Finals site: Bill Greehey Arena, San Antonio, Texas
- Champions: Minnesota State Mavericks (1st title)
- Runner-up: Franklin Pierce Ravens (1st title game)
- Semifinalists: Alaska Anchorage Seawolves (2nd Final Four); Delta State Lady Statesmen (9th Final Four)
- Winning coach: Pam Gohl (1st title)
- MOP: Heather Johnson (Minnesota State)

The 2009 NCAA Division II women's basketball tournament was the 28th annual tournament hosted by the NCAA to determine the national champion of Division II women's collegiate basketball in the United States.

Minnesota State defeated Franklin Pierce in the championship game, 103–94, to claim the Mavericks' first NCAA Division II national title.

The championship rounds were contested at Bill Greehey Arena on the campus of the St. Mary's University in San Antonio, Texas.

== Regionals ==
=== Atlantic - California, Pennsylvania ===
Location: Hamer Hall Host: California University of Pennsylvania

First round Round of 64; March 13
1	California (PA)	73
8	District of Columbia	55
4	Charleston (WV)	59
5	Millersville	49
6	Fayetteville State	53
3	Gannon	68
2	Indiana (PA)	78
7	Johnson C. Smith	66

Regional semifinals Round of 32; March 14
1	California (PA)	87
4	Charleston (WV)	48
3	Gannon	69*
2	Indiana (PA)	65

Regional finals Sweet Sixteen; March 16
1	California (PA)	64
3	Gannon	40

=== Midwest - Highland Heights, Kentucky ===
Location: Regents Hall Host: Northern Kentucky University

First round Round of 64; March 13
8	Grand Valley State	57
1	Northern Kentucky	66
4	Michigan Tech	70
5	Northwood	51
6	Drury	56
3	Quincy (IL)	66
2	Hillsdale	72
7	Indianapolis	73

Regional semifinals Round of 32; March 14
1	Northern Kentucky	53
4	Michigan Tech	76
3	Quincy (IL)	64
7	Indianapolis	74

Regional finals Sweet Sixteen; March 16
4	Michigan Tech	69
7	Indianapolis	52

=== Central - Mankato, Minnesota ===
Location: Taylor Center Host: Minnesota State University, Mankato

First round Round of 64; March 13
8	Augustana (SD)	68
1	Minnesota State	81
5	MSU Moorhead	67
4	Nebraska–Kearney	54
6	CSU Pueblo	55
3	Winona State	78
2	Fort Lewis	74
7	St. Cloud State	69

Regional semifinals Round of 32; March 14
1	Minnesota State	59
5	MSU Moorhead	39
3	Winona State	69
2	Fort Lewis	75*

Regional finals Sweet Sixteen; March 16
1	Minnesota State	72
2	Fort Lewis	61

=== East - Philadelphia, Pennsylvania ===
Location: Campus Center Gymnasium Host: Holy Family University

First round Round of 64; March 13
1	Franklin Pierce	80
8	Philadelphia	62
5	American International	71
4	Bentley	59
6	Saint Rose	58
3	Stonehill	62
2	Holy Family	73
7	Queens (NY)	43

Regional semifinals Round of 32; March 14
1	Franklin Pierce	65
5	American International	46
3	Stonehill	72
2	Holy Family	61

Regional finals Sweet Sixteen; March 16
1	Franklin Pierce	78
3	Stonehill	54

=== South - Cleveland, Mississippi ===
Location: Walter Sillers Coliseum Host: Delta State University

First round Round of 64; March 13
1	Delta State	58
8	Valdosta State	48
5	Arkansas–Monticello	78
4	Rollins	66
6	Clark Atlanta	63
3	Tampa	70
2	Fort Valley State	55
7	Ouachita Baptist	69

Regional semifinals Round of 32; March 14
1	Delta State	80
5	Arkansas–Monticello	56
3	Tampa	74
7	Ouachita Baptist	77

Regional finals Sweet Sixteen; March 16
1	Delta State	50
7	Ouachita Baptist	49

=== Southeast - Hickory, North Carolina ===
Location: Shuford Memorial Gymnasium Host: Lenoir-Rhyne College

First round Round of 64; March 13
8	Anderson (SC)	58
1	Lenoir-Rhyne	69
4	Francis Marion	101
5	USC Aiken	83
6	Carson-Newman	66
3	Clayton State	68
7	Lander	70
2	Tusculum	87

Regional semifinals Round of 32; March 14
1	Lenoir-Rhyne	74
4	Francis Marion	93
3	Clayton State	79
2	Tusculum	68

Regional finals Sweet Sixteen; March 16
4	Francis Marion	73
3	Clayton State	88

=== South Central - Canyon, Texas ===
Location: First United Bank Center Site: West Texas A&M University

First round Round of 64; March 13
8	Abilene Christian	53
1	West Texas A&M	78
4	Emporia State	78
5	St. Mary's (TX)	75
3	Central Oklahoma	68
6	SE Oklahoma State	66
7	Incarnate Word	38
2	Washburn	57

Regional semifinals Round of 32; March 14
1	West Texas A&M	86
4	Emporia State	83
3	Central Oklahoma	72
2	Washburn	63

Regional finals Sweet Sixteen; March 16
1	West Texas A&M	64
3	Central Oklahoma	49

=== West - Seattle, Washington ===
Location: Royal Brougham Pavilion Host: Seattle Pacific University

First round Round of 64; March 13
8	Grand Canyon	48
1	Seattle Pacific	77
4	Humboldt State	74
5	Western Washington	64
3	UC San Diego	66
6	Cal State Dominguez Hills	65
2	Alaska Anchorage	64
7	Northwest Nazarene	54

Regional semifinals Round of 32; March 14
1	Seattle Pacific	74
4	Humboldt State	56
3	UC San Diego	49
2	Alaska Anchorage	52

Regional finals Sweet Sixteen; March 16
1	Seattle Pacific	43
2	Alaska Anchorage	54

== Elite Eight - San Antonio, Texas ==
Location: St. Mary's Bill Greehey Arena Host: Saint Mary's University

National quarterfinals Elite Eight; March 24
S	Delta State	55
SC	West Texas A&M	47
NE	Franklin Pierce	88
E	California (PA)	73
W	Alaska Anchorage	66
SA	Clayton State	59
NC	Minnesota State	61
GL	Michigan Tech	53

National semifinals Final Four; March 25
S	Delta State	39
NE	Franklin Pierce	58
W	Alaska Anchorage	60
NC	Minnesota State	83

National championship March 27
NE	Franklin Pierce	94
NC	Minnesota State	103

== All-tournament team ==
- Heather Johnson, Minnesota State
- Alex Andrews, Minnesota State
- Joanne Noreen, Minnesota State
- Jennifer Leedham, Franklin Pierce
- Johannah Leedham, Franklin Pierce

== See also ==
- 2009 NCAA Division I women's basketball tournament
- 2009 NCAA Division III women's basketball tournament
- 2009 NAIA Division I women's basketball tournament
- 2009 NAIA Division II women's basketball tournament
- 2009 NCAA Division II men's basketball tournament
