= 2009 Southern Conference men's basketball tournament =

- 2009 SoCon Tournament logo
- Classification: Division I
- Season: 2008–09
- Teams: 12
- Site: McKenzie Arena; Chattanooga, Tennessee
- Champions: Chattanooga (10th title)
- Winning coach: John Shulman (2nd title)
- MVP: Stephen McDowell (Chattanooga)
- Attendance: 5,042 (Championship game)
- Television: SportSouth, ESPN

2008–09 Southern Conference men's basketball standings
	Conf.				Overall
Team	W		L	PCT	W		L	PCT
North
Western Carolina	11	–	9	.550	16	–	15	.516
Chattanooga †	11	–	9	.550	18	–	17	.514
Samford	9	–	11	.450	16	–	16	.500
Appalachian State	9	–	11	.450	13	–	18	.419
Elon	7	–	13	.350	11	–	20	.355
UNC Greensboro	4	–	16	.200	5	–	25	.167
South
Davidson	18	–	2	.900	27	–	8	.771
The Citadel	15	–	5	.750	20	–	13	.606
Charleston	15	–	5	.750	27	–	9	.750
Wofford	12	–	8	.600	16	–	14	.533
Georgia Southern	5	–	15	.250	8	–	22	.267
Furman	4	–	16	.200	6	–	24	.200
† SoCon Tournament winner As of April 30, 2009; Rankings from AP Poll

The 2009 Southern Conference men's basketball tournament took place between Friday, March 6 and Monday, March 9 in Chattanooga, Tennessee, at McKenzie Arena. The semifinals were televised by SportSouth, and the Southern Conference Championship Game was televised by ESPN.

== Bracket ==
First round Friday, March 6
N4	Appalachian State	86
S5	Georgia Southern	75
S3	Charleston	69
N6	UNC Greensboro	56
S4	Wofford	55
N5	Elon	62
N3	Samford	57
S6	Furman	52

Quarterfinals; Saturday, March 7
S1	Davidson	84
N4	Appalachian State	68
N2	Western Carolina	48
S3	Charleston	67
N1	Chattanooga	79
N5	Elon	78
S2	The Citadel	67
N3	Samford	76

Semifinals; Sunday, March 8
S1	Davidson	52
S3	Charleston	59
N1	Chattanooga	81
N3	Samford	70

Championship Game; Monday, March 9
S3	Charleston	69
N1	Chattanooga	80

== All-Tournament Team ==
First Team
Stephen McDowell, Chattanooga
Tony White Jr., College of Charleston
Stephen Curry, Davidson
Kevin Goffney, Chattanooga
Bryan Friday, Samford

Second Team
Nicchaeus Doaks, Chattanooga
Dustin Scott, College of Charleston
Donald Sims, Appalachian State
Andrew Goudelock, College of Charleston
Jeremy Simmons, College of Charleston
