= John Shulman =

American basketball coach (born 1966)

Current position
- Title: Head coach
- Team: Central Arkansas
- Conference: UAC
- Record: 31–36 (.463)

Biographical details
- Born: June 28, 1966 (age 60); Johnson City, Tennessee, U.S.
- Education: East Tennessee State (1989)

Coaching career (HC unless noted)
- 1985–1989: University HS (assistant)
- 1989–1990: Wofford (assistant)
- 1990–1996: East Tennessee State (assistant)
- 1996–1998: Wofford (assistant)
- 1998–2002: Tennessee Tech (assistant)
- 2002–2004: Chattanooga (assistant)
- 2004–2013: Chattanooga
- 2014–2018: McCallie School
- 2019–2024: Alabama-Huntsville
- 2024–present: Central Arkansas

Head coaching record
- Overall: 288–221 (.566) (NCAA); 100–32 (.758) (HS)
- Tournaments: 0–2 (NCAA D-I); 4–3 (NCAA D-II)

Accomplishments and honors

Championships
- 4 SoCon North Division (2005, 2008, 2009, 2011); 2 SoCon tournament (2005, 2009); 2 GSC tournament (2020, 2022); GSC West Division (2021); GSC regular season (2023); ASUN regular season (2026)

Awards
- ASUN Coach of the Year (2026); GSC West Division Coach of the Year (2021)

John Shulman (born June 28, 1966) is an American basketball coach who is currently the head coach at the University of Central Arkansas. He previously served as the head coach at the University of Alabama, Huntsville. He is a former head varsity boys' basketball coach at The McCallie School. Shulman also was head men's basketball coach at the University of Tennessee at Chattanooga. He joined TN-based Access America Transport in 2013 as Director of Sales for the organization. McCallie announced the hiring of Shulman in March 2014, saying he would serve not only as Head Basketball Coach, but also as the Director of Community Outreach. Shulman's nephew, Jeremy Shulman, is the head men's basketball coach at UT Martin.

== Head coaching record ==
Record table
Season	Team	Overall	Conference	Standing	Postseason
Chattanooga Mocs (Southern Conference) (2004–2013)
2004–05	Chattanooga	20–11	10–6	1st (North)	NCAA Division I First Round
2005–06	Chattanooga	19–13	8–6	2nd (North)	
2006–07	Chattanooga	15–18	6–12	4th (North)	
2007–08	Chattanooga	18–13	13–7	T–1st (North)	
2008–09	Chattanooga	18–17	11–9	T–1st (North)	NCAA Division I First Round
2009–10	Chattanooga	15–18	6–12	T–3rd (North)	
2010–11	Chattanooga	16–16	12–6	T–1st (North)	
2011–12	Chattanooga	11–21	5–13	6th (North)	
2012–13	Chattanooga	13–19	8–10	5th (North)	
Chattanooga:		145–146 (.498)	79–81 (.494)		
Alabama-Huntsville Chargers (Gulf South Conference) (2019–2024)
2019–20	Alabama-Huntsville	26–5	15–5	3rd	NCAA Division II First Round
2020–21	Alabama-Huntsville	15–4	12–1	1st (West)	NCAA Division II Regional Final
2021–22	Alabama-Huntsville	23–11	12–8	T–4th	NCAA Division II Second Round
2022–23	Alabama-Huntsville	27–8	19–5	T–1st	NCAA Division II Regional Final
2023–24	Alabama-Huntsville	21–11	17–7	T–2nd	NCAA Division II First Round
Alabama-Huntsville:		112–39 (.742)	75–26 (.743)		
Central Arkansas Bears (Atlantic Sun Conference) (2024–2026)
2024–25	Central Arkansas	9–24	4–14	T–10th	
2025–26	Central Arkansas	22–12	15–3	T–1st	
Central Arkansas:		31–36 (.463)	17–17 (.500)		
Total:		288–221 (.566)			
National champion Postseason invitational champion Conference regular season champion Conference regular season and conference tournament champion Division regular season champion Division regular season and conference tournament champion Conference tournament champion
