= 2009 Mountain West Conference men's basketball tournament =

- Classification: Division I
- Season: 2008–09
- Teams: 9
- Site: Thomas & Mack Center; Paradise, NV
- Champions: Utah (2nd title)
- Winning coach: Jim Boylen (1st title)
- MVP: Luke Nevill (Utah)
- Television: MountainWest Sports Network, CSTV, Versus

The 2009 Mountain West Conference men's basketball tournament was played at the Thomas & Mack Center in Las Vegas, Nevada from March 11–14, 2009. The tournament was sponsored by Conoco. The quarterfinal was broadcast live on the MountainWest Sports Network, the semifinal games on CBS College Sports Network, and the championship game on Versus. All games were available in HD.

Second-seeded Utah, one of three teams that shared the regular season conference title, defeated San Diego State 52–50 to claim the Mountain West Conference tournament championship and the league's automatic berth into the NCAA Tournament.

Of note, this was the first time that UNLV failed to make the championship game of the tournament when they were hosting. The Rebels did not play in the 2001 tournament due to a postseason ban.

== Regular season ==
Standings
		Conf		Overall		Post-tournament play	
Seed	School	W	L	W	L	Tournament	Eliminated
1	Brigham Young*	12	4	24	6	NCAA	1st round
2	Utah*	12	4	21	9	NCAA	1st round
3	New Mexico*	12	4	21	10	NIT	2nd round
4	San Diego State	11	5	21	8	NIT	Semifinals
5	UNLV	9	7	21	9	NIT	1st round
6	Wyoming	7	9	18	12	CBI	1st round
7	Texas Christian	5	11	14	16		
8	Colorado State	4	12	9	21		
9	Air Force	0	16	9	20		

== Tournament bracket ==
First round Wednesday, March 11
8	Colorado State	67
9	Air Force	71

Quarterfinals; Thursday, March 12
1	#25 BYU	80
9	Air Force	69
4	San Diego State	71
5	UNLV	57
3	New Mexico	67
6	Wyoming	75
2	Utah	61
7	TCU	58

Semifinals; Friday, March 13
1	#25 BYU	62
4	San Diego State	64
6	Wyoming	55
2	Utah	68

Championship; Saturday, March 14
4	San Diego State	50
2	Utah	52
