= Demetri McCamey =

American basketball player

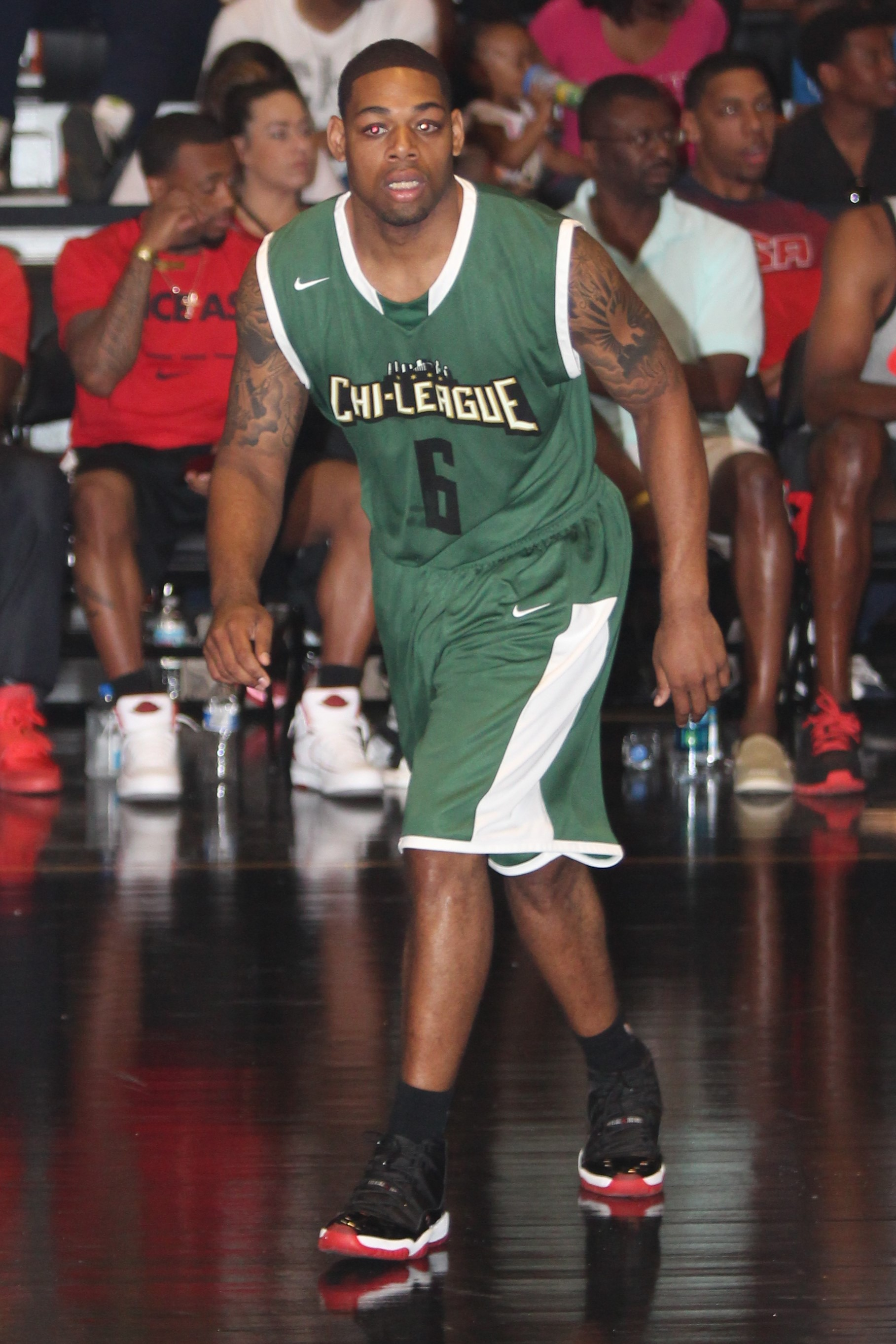
- McCamey in the Nike summer basketball Chi-League in 2014

Personal information
- Born: February 21, 1989 (age 37) Bellwood, Illinois, US
- Listed height: 6 ft 3 in (1.91 m)
- Listed weight: 200 lb (91 kg)

Career information
- High school: St. Joseph (Westchester, Illinois)
- College: Illinois (2007–2011)
- NBA draft: 2011: undrafted
- Playing career: 2011–2019
- Position: Point guard / shooting guard

Career history
- 2011: Mersin Büyükşehir Belediyesi
- 2011–2012: Hapoel Jerusalem
- 2012: Rio Grande Valley Vipers
- 2012–2013: Erie BayHawks
- 2013: Fort Wayne Mad Ants
- 2013–2014: Cairns Taipans
- 2014–2015: Oita Heat Devils
- 2015–2017: Austin Spurs
- 2017–2018: Fortitudo Bologna
- 2018–2019: Austin Spurs

Career highlights
- First-team All-Big Ten (2010); 2× Third-team All-Big Ten (2009, 2011)
- Stats at Basketball Reference

Demetri McCamey Jr. (born February 21, 1989) is an American former professional basketball player who played for the Austin Spurs of the NBA G League. His prior professional experience includes time with the NBA Development League's Erie BayHawks, Rio Grande Valley Vipers and Fort Wayne Mad Ants, as well as time abroad with Hapoel Jerusalem, Mersin Büyükşehir Belediyesi, Oita Heat Devils and Cairns Taipans. He played college basketball for the University of Illinois where he completed his senior season in 2010–11 and was the 2009–10 Big Ten assists champion (7.06) and the 2009–10 NCAA runner-up.

He played high school basketball with Big Ten Conference foe Evan Turner on the St. Joseph High School (in Westchester) basketball team. He was a first-team All-state selection according to numerous publications.

As a sophomore, he led the 2008–09 team in scoring average, and he was chosen as a third team 2008–09 All-Big Ten Conference player by both the coaches and the media. During his junior season, he led the big ten in assists per game. He holds the Illinois single-season assist/game (7.06) and single-game assists (16) records. Following the 2009–10 All-Big Ten Conference regular season, he was named a first-team All-conference selection by both the coaches and the media. He became the first Fighting Illini to average over seven assists per game over the course of a season during the 2009–10 NCAA Division I men's basketball season. As a senior, he was a third team All-Big Ten selection for the 2010–11 Big Ten season. As a senior his assist numbers fell, but his shooting percentages rose.

== High school career ==
He was part of a 2005 Chicago area sophomore class that was considered to be the best in the history of the state of Illinois. It included Derrick Rose and his St. Joseph's teammate Turner. Isiah Thomas is St. Joseph's most famous basketball alum, but McCamey was at the time mentioned as the potential next great St. Joseph's product. The class of 2007 was compared to the Chicago area class of 1979 that included Thomas, Terry Cummings, and Darrell Walker as well as the class of 1998 that included Quentin Richardson, Corey Maggette, Frank Williams, Bobby Simmons, Michael Wright. McCamey was considered the second best area prospect after Rose.

As a junior, he and Turner attended 2005 Midnight Madness with the Wisconsin Badgers men's basketball team. At the beginning of his junior season, Chicago Tribune named him to its annual top Chicago metropolitan area basketball players list, and it ranked St. Joseph number three in the area. The team went to the state sectional final before its season ended with a 75–72 sectional final loss to Proviso East High School. After his junior season, he was considered one of the top 25 prospects in the country in his class according to one scout, and he was given special mention by the Chicago Tribune and honorable mention by the Associated Press for all-state honors.

During his senior season, his team was listed second to Rose's Simeon Career Academy in the preseason Tribune Chicago area high school basketball team rankings. That season, he was named to the second-team Associated Press 2006–07 Class AA all-state team, a day before Rose's Simeon eliminated Turner's St. Joseph in the Illinois Class AA supersectional. McCamey and Turner finished sixth and third to Rose in the Illinois Mr. Basketball voting, and the Chicago Tribune chose both of them as first team All-state selections along with Rose. He was also a first team selection by Chicago Sun-Times, Champaign-Urbana News-Gazette and Illinois Basketball Coaches Association. McCamey was ranked as the #10, #11 and #10 point guard in the nation as a high school senior by ESPN, Rivals.com, and Scout.com respectively.

College recruiting
Name	Hometown	School	Height	Weight	Commit date
Demetri McCamey; PG	Chicago, Illinois	St. Joseph (IL)	6 ft 3 in (1.91 m)	200 lb (91 kg)	Jun 30, 2006
Demetri McCamey; PG	Recruit ratings: Scout: Rivals: (96)				
Overall recruit ranking: Scout: 10 (PG) Rivals: 72, 11 (PG) ESPN: 63, 10 (PG)
Note: In many cases, Scout, Rivals, 247Sports, On3, and ESPN may conflict in their listings of height and weight.; In these cases, the average was taken. ESPN grades are on a 100-point scale.; Sources: "Illinois Basketball Commitments". Rivals.; "2007 Illinois Basketball Commits". Scout.; "ESPN". ESPN.; "Scout.com Team Recruiting Rankings". Scout.; "2007 Team Ranking". Rivals.

== College career ==
=== Freshman season ===
When McCamey posted 31 points on February 7, 2008, against Indiana, it was the season high for the 2007-08 Illinois Fighting Illini men's basketball team and the most by an Illinois Fighting Illini men's basketball freshman in fourteen years. During the 2008 Big Ten Conference men's basketball tournament he made six three point shots in six attempts against Purdue, which set a Big Ten Conference men's basketball tournament single-game record and tied the Illinois school single-game record for three point field goal percentage (most made with no misses).

=== Sophomore season ===
He was chosen as a third team 2008–09 All-Big Ten Conference player by both the Big Ten coaches and the Big Ten media. McCamey was also a National Association of Basketball Coaches (NABC) Division I District 7 All‐District second team choice. Since the Big Ten Conference was its own district, this is equivalent to being named second team All-Big Ten by the NABC. He led the 2008–09 Illinois Fighting Illini team in scoring average and was second in assists. On February 12, 2009, he scored the game-winning bank shot with 2.9 seconds remaining against Northwestern. Although he only ranked fourth in the conference in assists, he had the highest assist average in conference games.

=== Junior season ===
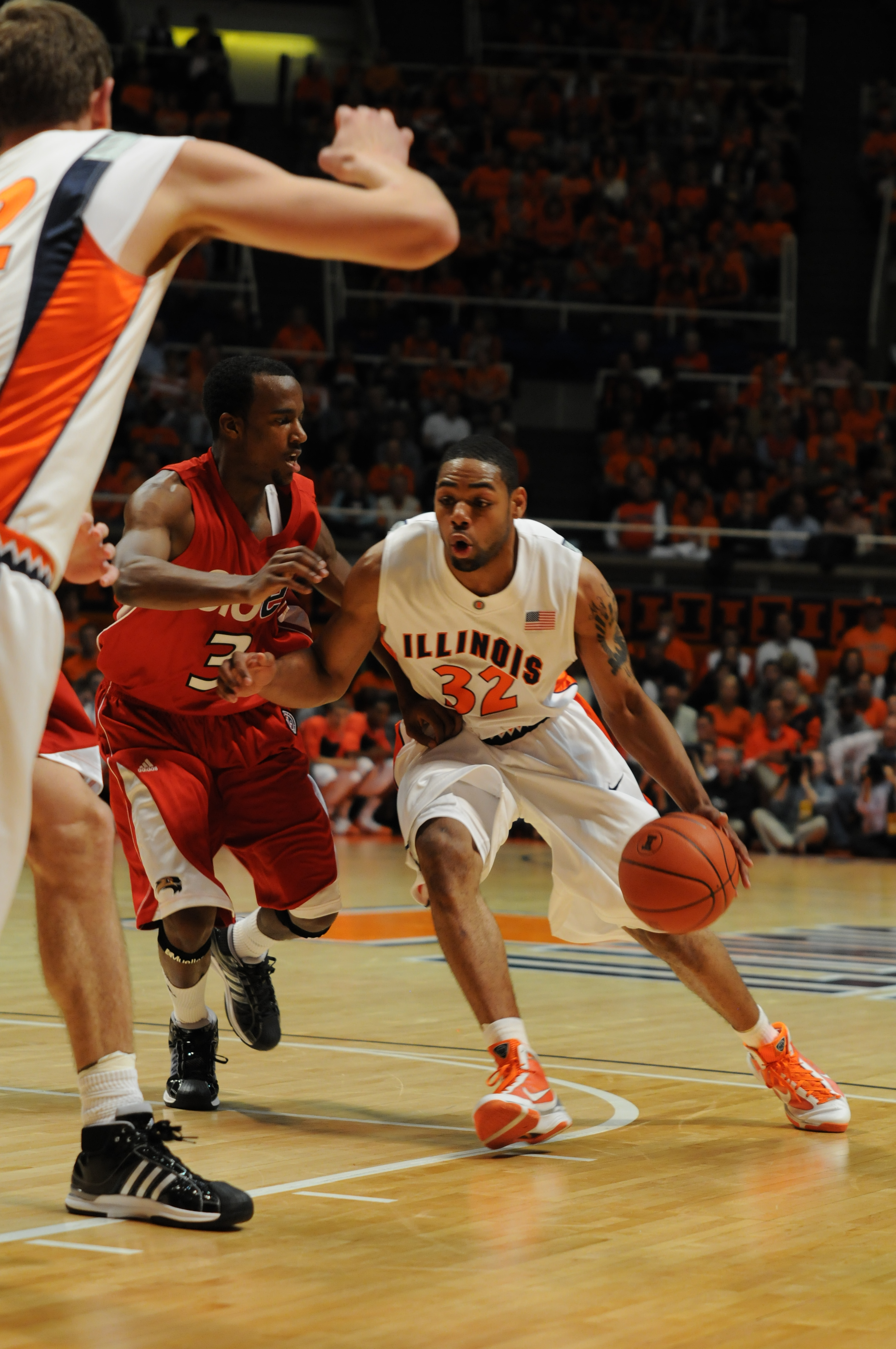
McCamey driving to the basket (2009-11-13)

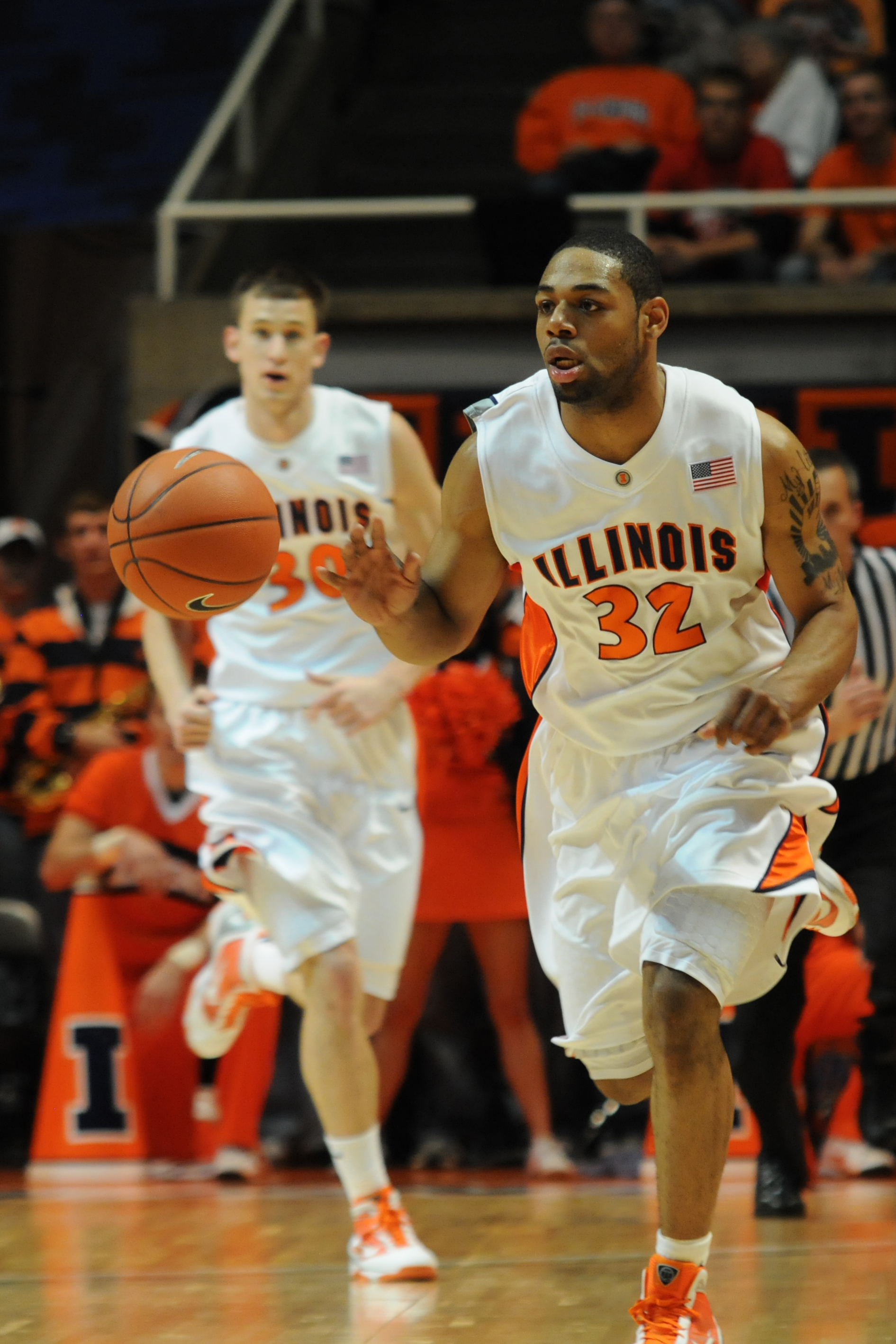
McCamey dribbling upcourt (2009-11-13)

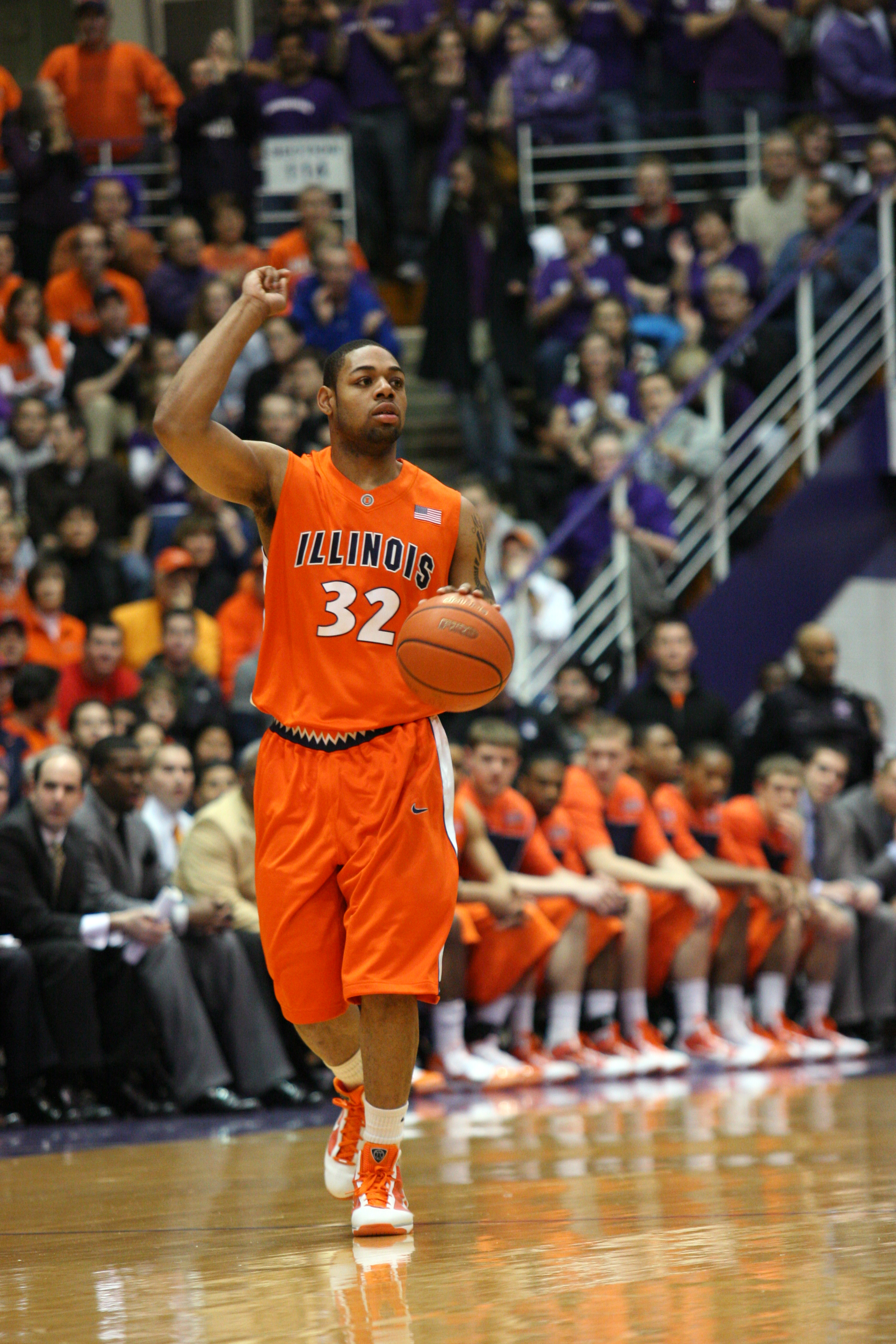
McCamey signals a play (2010-01-23)

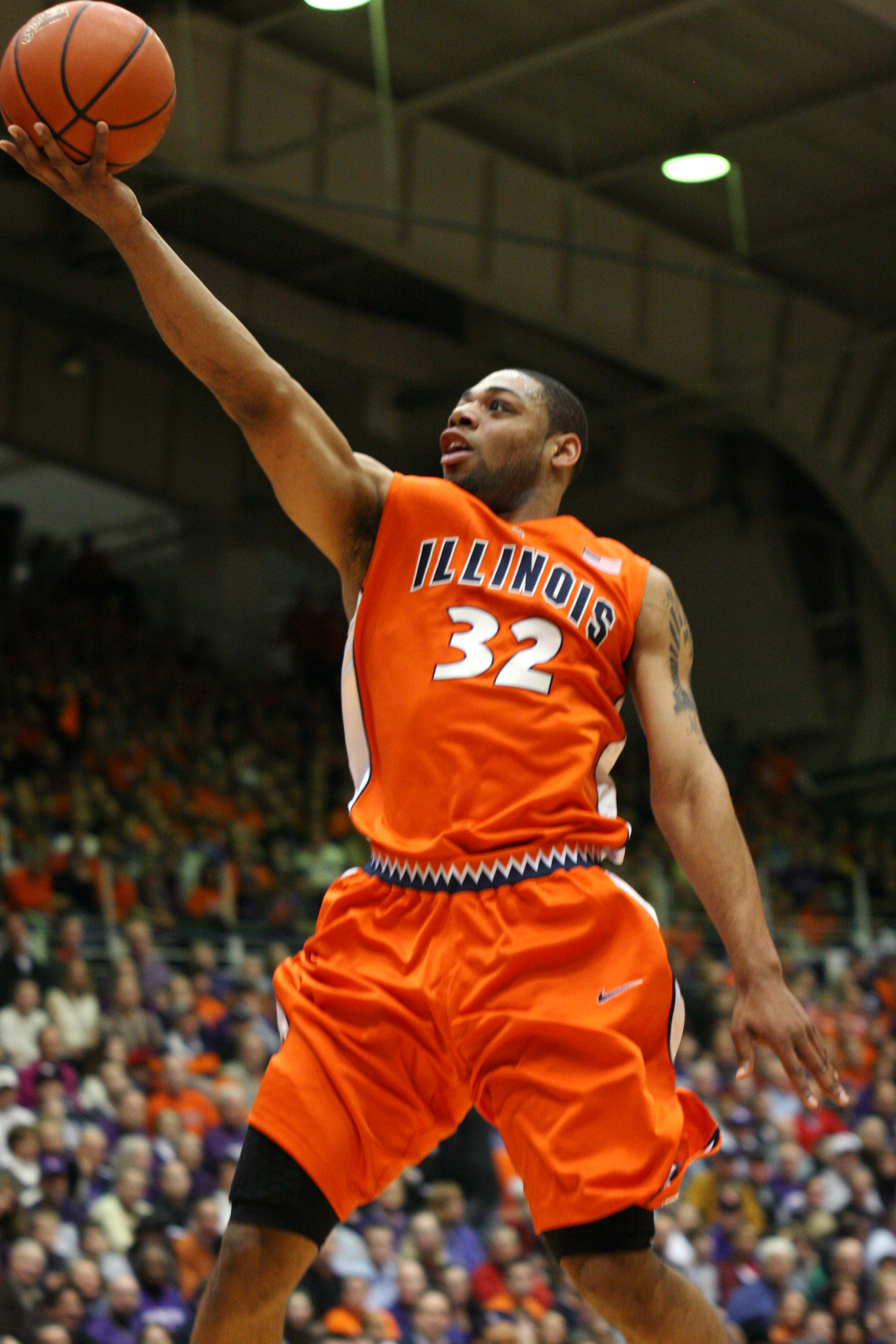
McCamey doing a finger roll (2010-01-23)

McCamey was named co-Big Ten Conference Player of the Week for February 8, 2010. On February 20, he recorded 16 assists, which is the fourth highest single-game total in Big Ten history. This total set an Illinois Fighting Illini men's basketball single-game record.

McCamey led the Big Ten in assists (7.06). He was also tenth in scoring and eighth in steals. His 254 assists in 36 games resulting in a 7.06 assist per game average eclipsed Deron Williams' 264 in 39 games (6.77 average) posted during the 2004–05 NCAA Division I men's basketball season. Thus, McCamey took over the Fighting Illini single-season assist per game record. His total of 254 was the fourth highest in Big Ten history and only 20 shy of Mateen Cleaves' Big Ten single-season record of 274. Williams' 264 is the Fighting Illini record. McCamey's total of 525 after his junior season left him 291 short of Cleaves' career record of 816. Bruce Douglas holds the Fighting Illini record with a total of 765.

At the end of the regular season, he was a first-team All-Big Ten selection by both the coaches and the media. McCamey was selected by the U.S. Basketball Writers Association to the ten-man All-District V team covering college basketball players in the states of Ohio, Indiana, Illinois, Michigan, Minnesota, and Wisconsin. McCamey was selected to the 2010 Big Ten Conference men's basketball tournament team. He was recognized as an All-District first-team selection by the National Association of Basketball Coaches, making him eligible for the State Farm Division I All‐America teams. McCamey had entered his name for the 2010 NBA draft, but did not hire an agent and withdrew his name prior to the May 8, 2010, deadline.

=== Senior season ===
He was a preseason first team all-conference selection by the Big Ten media for the 2010–11 Big Ten Conference men's basketball season. He was a preseason top 50 candidate for the Wooden Award. McCamey scored 30 points for the first time since his freshman season on December 8, 2010, against the Oakland Golden Grizzlies. On January 3, 2011, he was named co-Big Ten Player of the Week. On January 15, 2011, against Wisconsin, he made a career-high 17 free throws.

In December he was named to the 67-man Bob Cousy Award watchlist, and he was named as one of 20 finalists in January. McCamey was selected to the Naismith Award Midseason Top 30 List. Following the 2010–11 Big Ten Conference men's basketball season, he was a third team All-Big Ten selection by the coaches and the media. McCamey was selected by the United States Basketball Writers Association to its 2010–11 Men's All-District Team. He was among the final ten candidates for the Bob Cousy Award.

As a senior, his assist average fell from 7.1 to 6.1 per game, but his three-point shot and free throw percentages rose from his prior years. He shot 45.1% versus 34.1% in three point shots the prior year, which had been a career best. Both his junior and senior seasons he took 164 attempts, but he made 74 as a senior versus just 56 as a junior. His free throw percentage also recovered a bit in his senior season moving to 72.4% from 70.7% but still below his sophomore effort of 76.4%. He finished second in the Big Ten in assists to Darius Morris, but also finished third in three point shooting percentage.

== Professional career ==
=== Europe ===
On July 14, 2011, McCamey signed with Mersin Büyükşehir Belediyesi of the Turkish Basketball League. On December 8, 2011, he parted ways with Mersin after appearing in just seven games. On December 16, 2011, he signed with Hapoel Jerusalem. In January 2012, he left Hapoel after appearing in just four games.

=== National Basketball Association ===
In July 2012, McCamey joined the Chicago Bulls for the 2012 NBA Summer League. On September 25, 2012, he signed with the Houston Rockets. However, he was later waived by the Rockets on October 12, 2012. In November 2012, he was acquired by the Rio Grande Valley Vipers of the NBA Development League as an affiliate player of the Rockets. He played in games for the Vipers until December 21. On December 25, 2012, he was waived by the Vipers. Two days later, he was acquired by the Erie BayHawks and debuted with the team on December 28. On March 12, 2013, he was waived by the BayHawks. Later that month, he was acquired by the Fort Wayne Mad Ants.

In July 2013, McCamey joined the Minnesota Timberwolves for the 2013 NBA Summer League.

=== Australia ===
On August 27, 2013, McCamey signed a one-year deal with Cairns Taipans. In 28 games for the Taipans, he averaged 11.6 points, 3.3 rebounds and 2.9 assists per game.

=== Japan ===
In August 2014, McCamey signed with the Oita Heat Devils of the Japanese bj league. In 50 games for the Heat Devils, he averaged 12.9 points, 3.3 rebounds, 3.3 assists and 1.1 steals per game.

=== Return to D-League ===
On October 31, 2015, McCamey was selected by the Austin Spurs in the second round of the 2015 NBA Development League Draft. He made the opening night roster and averaged 9.4 points in 55 games during the 2015–16 season.

On October 29, 2016, McCamey was reacquired by the Spurs.

=== Italy ===
On June 17, 2017, McCamey signed with Fortitudo Pallacanestro Bologna of the Serie A2 Basket.

=== Return to Austin ===
On December 15, 2018, the Austin Spurs announced that they had re-signed McCamey.

== Personal ==
McCamey is the son of Demetri McCamey Sr. and Sabrina Watson. He has three brothers and one sister. He was a member of the Jessie White Tumbling Team as a youngster.
