= McCamey =

McCamey may refer to:

- McCamey, Texas, city in Texas, United States
- Demetri McCamey (born 1989), American basketball player
