= 2007–08 Minnesota Golden Gophers men's basketball team =

American college basketball season

2007–08 Minnesota Golden Gophers men's basketball

NIT First Round vs. Maryland, L 68–58
- Conference: Big Ten Conference
- Record: 20–14 (8–10 Big Ten)
- Head coach: Tubby Smith
- Assistant coaches: Ron Jirsa; Saul Smith; Vince Taylor
- Home arena: Williams Arena

2007–08 Big Ten Conference men's basketball standings
	Conf.				Overall
Team	W		L	PCT	W		L	PCT
No. 6 Wisconsin†	16	–	2	.889	31	–	5	.861
No. 20 Purdue	15	–	3	.833	25	–	9	.735
Indiana	14	–	4	.778	25	–	8	.758
No. 18 Michigan State	12	–	6	.667	27	–	9	.750
Ohio State	10	–	8	.556	24	–	13	.649
Minnesota	8	–	10	.444	20	–	14	.588
Penn State	7	–	11	.389	15	–	16	.484
Iowa	6	–	12	.333	13	–	19	.406
Illinois	5	–	13	.278	16	–	19	.457
Michigan	5	–	13	.278	10	–	22	.313
Northwestern	1	–	17	.056	8	–	22	.267
† 2008 Big Ten tournament winner As of March 23, 2008; Rankings from AP poll

The 2007–08 Minnesota Golden Gophers men's basketball team represented the University of Minnesota in the college basketball season of 2007–2008. The team's head coach, Tubby Smith began his first year at Minnesota after leaving Kentucky in March 2007. The Golden Gophers played their home games at Williams Arena in Minneapolis, Minnesota and are members of the Big Ten Conference.

== Season ==
On March 7, 2007, it was announced that Tubby Smith would be leaving Kentucky after ten years to coach at Minnesota. Smith still had 4 years left on his contract, but elected to sign on for seven years with the Golden Gophers. The season was highlighted with a run in the Big Ten tournament, where the Gophers defeated Northwestern in the first round, then shocked Indiana with a last second, miraculous jump shot by Blake Hoffarber to advance to the semifinals. Blake's shot earned him the second ESPY nomination of his career. Minnesota would then lose to Illinois and be selected as a #4 seed in the National Invitation Tournament, where they made a first round exit on their home court.

== Roster ==
#	Name	Height	Weight (lbs.)	Position	Class	Hometown	Previous Team(s)
0	Al Nolen	6'1"	180	G	Fr.	Minneapolis, MN, U.S.	Minneapolis Henry HS
1	Lawrence McKenzie	6'2"	180	G	RSr.	Minneapolis, MN, U.S.	Minneapolis Henry HS; Oklahoma
2	Ryan Saunders	6'1"	180	G	RJr.	Medina, MN, U.S.	Wayzata HS
3	Kevin Payton	6'5"	215	G	RSo.	Camden, NJ, U.S.	Camden HS
4	Travis Busch	6'4"	220	G/F	RSo.	Mounds View, MN, U.S.	Mounds View HS; Cal Poly
11	Jon Williams	6'9"	285	C	RJr.	St. Cloud, MN, U.S.	St. Cloud Apollo HS; Notre Dame Prep (MA)
13	Dan Coleman	6'9"	225	F	RSr.	Minneapolis, MN, U.S.	Hopkins HS
20	Lawrence Westbrook	6'0"	195	G	So.	Chandler, AZ, U.S.	Winchendon Prep
23	Brandon Smith	6'6"	220	G/F	Jr.	Minneapolis, MN, U.S.	Minneapolis Henry HS
24	Blake Hoffarber	6'4"	200	G	Fr.	Minnetonka, MN, U.S.	Hopkins HS
33	Jamal Abu-Shamala	6'5"	210	G/F	Jr.	Shakopee, MN, U.S.	Shakopee HS
34	Damian Johnson	6'7"	195	F	RSo.	Thibodaux, LA, U.S.	Thibodaux HS
50	Spencer Tollackson	6'9"	260	C	Sr.	Chaska, MN, U.S.	Chaska HS

== 2007–08 Schedule and results ==
Date time, TV	Rank^{#}	Opponent^{#}	Result	Record	Site city, state
Exhibition
November 1, 2007*; 7:00 pm		Minnesota State	W 94–68	–	Williams Arena (11,508); Minneapolis, MN
November 6, 2007*; 6:00 pm, BTN		Southwest Minnesota State	W 88–52	–	Williams Arena (11,197); Minneapolis, MN
Regular Season
November 10, 2007*; 2:00 pm		Army	W 84–52	1–0	Williams Arena (11,529); Minneapolis, MN
November 20, 2007*; 7:00 pm, Mediacom		at Iowa State	W 68–58	2–0	Hilton Coliseum (13,709); Ames, IA
November 24, 2007* no, ESPN360		Central Michigan	W 77–59	3–0	Williams Arena; Minneapolis, MN
November 27, 2007* no, ESPN2		at Florida State; ACC–Big Ten Challenge	L 75–61	3–1	Donald L. Tucker Center; Tallahassee, FL
December 1, 2007* no, BTN		UC Riverside	W 75–38	4–1	Williams Arena; Minneapolis, MN
December 3, 2007* no, BTN		North Dakota State	W 88–56	5–1	Williams Arena; Minneapolis, MN
December 8, 2007* no, ESPN360		Colorado State	W 91–74	6–1	Williams Arena; Minneapolis, MN
December 12, 2007* no, BTN		South Dakota State	W 78–72	7–1	William's Arena; Minneapolis, MN
December 22, 2007* no, ESPNU		Santa Clara	W 68–50	8–1	William's Arena; Minneapolis, MN
December 28, 2007* no, no		vs. Nicholls State; Duel in the Desert	W 77–32	9–1	Thomas & Mack Center; Paradise, NV
December 29, 2007* no, no		vs. Kennesaw State; Duel in the Desert	W 83–66	10–1	Thomas & Mack Center; Las Vegas, NV
December 30, 2007* no, no		vs. UNLV; Duel in the Desert	L 81–64	10–2	Thomas & Mack Center; Las Vegas, NV
Big Ten Regular Season
January 5, 2008 no, BTN		at No. 6 Michigan State	L 65–59	10–3 (0–1)	Breslin Center; East Lansing, MI
January 9, 2008 no, BTN		Northwestern	W 82–63	11–3 (1–1)	Williams Arena; Minneapolis, MN
January 12, 2008 no, BTN		at Penn State	W 76–73	12–3 (2–1)	Bryce Jordan Center; University Park, PA
January 17, 2008 no, ESPN		No. 9 Indiana	L 65–60	12–4 (2–2)	Williams Arena; Minneapolis, MN
January 20, 2008 no, BTN		No. 11 Michigan State	L 78–73	12–5 (2–3)	Williams Arena; Minneapolis, MN
January 26, 2008 no, BTN		at Ohio State	L 76–60	12–6 (2–4)	Jerome Schottenstein Center; Columbus, OH
January 31, 2008 no, BTN		at Michigan	W 77–65	13–6 (3–4)	Crisler Arena; Ann Arbor, MI
February 3, 2008 no, BTN		No. 13 Wisconsin	L 63–47	13–7 (3–5)	Williams Arena; Minneapolis, MN
February 6, 2008 no, BTN		at Northwestern	W 92–72	14–7 (4–5)	Welsh-Ryan Arena; Evanston, IL
February 9, 2008 no, ESPN		at Iowa	W 63–50	15–7 (5–5)	Williams Arena; Minneapolis, MN
February 12, 2008 no, BTN		Illinois	L 84–60	15–8 (5–6)	Williams Arena; Minneapolis, MN
February 16, 2008 no, BTN		at No. 15 Wisconsin	L 65–56	15–9 (5–7)	Kohl Center; Madison, WI
February 21, 2008 no, ESPN2		Michigan	W 69–60	16–9 (6–7)	Williams Arena; Minneapolis, MN
February 24, 2008 no, BTN		Penn State	W 75–68	17–9 (7–7)	Williams Arena; Minneapolis, MN
February 27, 2008 no, BTN		at No. 16 Purdue	L 65–53	17–10 (7–8)	Mackey Arena; West Lafayette, IN
March 1, 2008 no, ESPN		Ohio State	W 71–57	18–10 (8–8)	Williams Arena; Minneapolis, MN
March 5, 2008 no, BTN		at No. 18 Indiana	L 69–55	18–11 (8–9)	Assembly Hall; Bloomington, IN
March 8, 2008 no, BTN		at Illinois	L 67–58	18–12 (8–10)	Assembly Hall; Champaign, IL
2008 Big Ten tournament
March 13, 2008 no, ESPN2	(6)	vs. (11) Northwestern; First Round	W 55–52	19–12	Conseco Fieldhouse; Indianapolis, IN
March 14, 2008 no, BTN	(6)	vs. (3) No. 22 Indiana; Quarterfinals	W 59–58	20–12	Conseco Fieldhouse; Indianapolis, IN
March 15, 2008 no, CBS	(6)	vs. (10) Illinois; Semifinals	L 50–54	20–13	Conseco Fieldhouse; Indianapolis, IN
2008 National Invitation tournament
March 18, 2008 no, ESPN	(4)	(5) Maryland; First Round	L 68–58	20–14	Williams Arena; Minneapolis, MN
*Non-conference game. ^{#}Rankings from AP Poll. (#) Tournament seedings in parentheses.

== Rankings ==
The 2007–08 Minnesota Golden Gophers basketball team was not ranked during the season.
