= 2007–08 Illinois Fighting Illini men's basketball team =

American college basketball season

2007–08 Illinois Fighting Illini men's basketball
- Conference: Big Ten Conference
- Record: 16–19 (5–13 Big Ten)
- Head coach: Bruce Weber (5th season)
- Assistant coaches: Wayne McClain (7th season); Jay Price (5th season); Jerrance Howard (1st season)
- MVP: None Selected
- Captains: Chester Frazier; Brian Randle
- Home arena: Assembly Hall

2007–08 Big Ten Conference men's basketball standings
	Conf.				Overall
Team	W		L	PCT	W		L	PCT
No. 6 Wisconsin†	16	–	2	.889	31	–	5	.861
No. 20 Purdue	15	–	3	.833	25	–	9	.735
Indiana	14	–	4	.778	25	–	8	.758
No. 18 Michigan State	12	–	6	.667	27	–	9	.750
Ohio State	10	–	8	.556	24	–	13	.649
Minnesota	8	–	10	.444	20	–	14	.588
Penn State	7	–	11	.389	15	–	16	.484
Iowa	6	–	12	.333	13	–	19	.406
Illinois	5	–	13	.278	16	–	19	.457
Michigan	5	–	13	.278	10	–	22	.313
Northwestern	1	–	17	.056	8	–	22	.267
† 2008 Big Ten tournament winner As of March 23, 2008; Rankings from AP poll

The 2007–08 Illinois Fighting Illini men's basketball team represented University of Illinois at Urbana–Champaign in the 2007–08 NCAA Division I men's basketball season. This was head coach Bruce Weber's fifth season at Illinois. The team finished with 5–13 conference and 16–19 overall records. A runner-up finish in the Big Ten tournament, and the play of freshman guard Demetri McCamey highlighted the season. Shaun Pruitt was the lone all-Big-Ten honoree; he was named to the all-Big-Ten third team by the press.

== Roster ==
2007–08 Illinois Fighting Illini men's basketball team
Players
Coaches

Pos.	#	Name	Height	Weight	Year	Previous school	Hometown
G	1	Trent Meacham	6 ft 2 in (1.88 m)	195 lb (88 kg)	RS Jr	Centennial High School	Champaign, IL
G	2	Chris Hicks	6 ft 2 in (1.88 m)	195 lb (88 kg)	Sr	Whitney Young High School	Chicago, IL
G	3	Chester Frazier (C)	6 ft 2 in (1.88 m)	190 lb (86 kg)	Jr	Lake Clifton Eastern High School	Baltimore, MD
G	13	Jeffrey Jordan	6 ft 1 in (1.85 m)	185 lb (84 kg)	Fr	Loyola Academy	Highland Park, IL
G	15	Alex Legion (I)	6 ft 5 in (1.96 m)	195 lb (88 kg)	Fr	Oak Hill Academy/University of Kentucky	Detroit, MI
G	22	Steve Holdren	6 ft 5 in (1.96 m)	200 lb (91 kg)	RS Jr	Centennial High School	Champaign, IL
F	23	Rodney Alexander	6 ft 7 in (2.01 m)	225 lb (102 kg)	Jr	Benton Harbor High School/Redlands Community College	Benton Harbor, MI
F	24	Mike Davis	6 ft 9 in (2.06 m)	205 lb (93 kg)	Fr	T. C. Williams High School	Alexandria, VA
G	25	Calvin Brock	6 ft 5 in (1.96 m)	200 lb (91 kg)	RS Jr	Simeon High School	Chicago, IL
F	30	Bill Cole	6 ft 9 in (2.06 m)	210 lb (95 kg)	Fr	Richwoods High School	Peoria, IL
G	31	Jamar Smith (S) (redshirt)	6 ft 3 in (1.91 m)	185 lb (84 kg)	Jr	Richwoods High School	Peoria, IL
G	32	Demetri McCamey	6 ft 3 in (1.91 m)	205 lb (93 kg)	Fr	St. Joseph High School	Bellwood, IL
C	33	Brian Carlwell	6 ft 11 in (2.11 m)	265 lb (120 kg)	So	Proviso East High School	Maywood, IL
F	42	Brian Randle (C)	6 ft 8 in (2.03 m)	220 lb (100 kg)	RS Sr	Notre Dame High School	East Peoria, IL
F	50	Richard Semrau	6 ft 9 in (2.06 m)	235 lb (107 kg)	RS Fr	Lutheran West	Grafton, OH
C	54	Mike Tisdale	7 ft 1 in (2.16 m)	215 lb (98 kg)	Fr	Riverton High School	Riverton, IL
C	55	Shaun Pruitt	6 ft 10 in (2.08 m)	245 lb (111 kg)	Sr	West Aurora High School	Aurora, IL

Head coach

- Bruce Weber (Milwaukee)

Assistant coach(es)

- Jerrance Howard (Illinois)
- Wayne McClain (Illinois State)
- Jay Price (Kansas)

Legend

- (C) Team captain
- (S) Suspended
- (I) Ineligible
- (W) Walk-on
- Injured
- Current redshirt

Roster

== Schedule ==
Date time, TV	Rank^{#}	Opponent^{#}	Result	Record	Site (attendance) city, state
Exhibition
10/31/07*; 7:00 pm		Quincy	W 82–61		Assembly Hall (16,618); Champaign, IL
11/6/07*; 7:00 pm		Kentucky Wesleyan	W 76–39		Assembly Hall (16,618); Champaign, IL
Non-Conference regular season
11/11/07*; ESPN360		Northeastern	W 63–55	1–0	Assembly Hall (16,618); Champaign, IL
11/16/07*		at Hawaii	W 79–77	2–0	Stan Sheriff Center (6,308); Honolulu, HI
11/19/07*; ESPN2		vs. Arizona State; Maui Invitational	W 77–54	3–0	Lahaina Civic Center (2,500); Lahaina, HI
11/20/07*; ESPN		vs. No. 13 Duke; Maui Invitational	L 66-79	3–1	Lahaina Civic Center (2,500); Lahaina, HI
11/21/07*; ESPN2		vs. Oklahoma State; Maui Invitational	W 65–49	4–1	Lahaina Civic Center (2,500); Lahaina, HI
11/28/07*; ESPN2		at Maryland	L 61–69	4–2	Comcast Center (17,950); College Park, MD
12/01/07*; BTN		Weber State	W 78–61	5–2	Assembly Hall (16,618); Champaign, IL
12/08/07*; ESPN		vs. No. 22 Arizona	L 72–78 ^{OT}	5–3	United Center (19,573); Chicago, IL
12/17/07*; BTN		Western Carolina	W 58–35	6–3	Assembly Hall (16,618); Champaign, IL
12/20/07*; BTN		Miami (OH)	L 58–61 ^{OT}	6–4	Assembly Hall (16,618); Champaign, IL
12/22/07*; ESPN2		vs. Missouri; Braggin' Rights	W 59–58	7–4	Scottrade Center (21,941); St. Louis, MO
12/28/07*; BTN		Loyola (MD)	W 77–43	8–4	Assembly Hall (16,618); Champaign, IL
12/30/07; BTN		Tennessee State	L 58–60	8–5	Assembly Hall (16,618); Champaign, IL
Big Ten regular season
1/03/08; ESPN		Ohio State	L 58–74	8–6 (0–1)	Assembly Hall (16,618); Champaign, IL
1/06/08; BTN		Penn State	L 64–68	8–7 (0–2)	Assembly Hall (16,618); Champaign, IL
1/10/08; ESPN		at No. 21 Wisconsin	L 60–70	8–8 (0–3)	Kohl Center (17,190); Madison, WI
1/13/08; CBS		at No. 10 Indiana; Rivalry	L 58–62	8–9 (0–4)	Assembly Hall (17,359); Bloomington, IN
1/16/08; BTN		Michigan	W 75–57	9–9 (1–4)	Assembly Hall (16,618); Champaign, IL
1/19/08; ESPN		at Purdue	L 67–74	9–10 (1–5)	Mackey Arena (14,123); West Lafayette, IN
1/22/08; BTN		at Ohio State	L 58–64	9–11 (1–6)	Value City Arena (19,049); Columbus, OH
1/27/08; BTN		Northwestern; Rivalry	W 70–37	10–11 (2–6)	Assembly Hall (16,618); Champaign, IL
1/30/08; BTN		at No. 8 Michigan State	L 41–51	10–12 (2–7)	Breslin Center (14,759); East Lansing, MI
2/02/08; BTN		Purdue	L 75–83	10–13 (2–8)	Assembly Hall (16,618); Champaign, IL
2/07/08; ESPN		No. 14 Indiana; Rivalry	L 79–83 ^{2OT}	10–14 (2–9)	Assembly Hall (16,618); Champaign, IL
2/12/08; BTN		at Minnesota	W 84–60	11–14 (3–9)	Williams Arena (12,773); Minneapolis, MN
2/16/08; BTN		at Penn State	L 51–52	11–15 (3–10)	Bryce Jordan Center (10,632); University Park, PA
2/20/08; BTN		No. 11 Wisconsin	L 57–71	11–16 (3–11)	Assembly Hall (16,618); Champaign, IL
2/23/08; BTN		at Michigan	L 43–49	11–17 (3–12)	Crisler Arena (11,017); Ann Arbor, MI
3/01/08; BTN		at Iowa; Rivalry	W 58–47	12–17 (4–12)	Carver-Hawkeye Arena (15,500); Iowa City, IA
3/06/08; ESPN2		No. 17 Michigan State	L 51–59	12–18 (4–13)	Assembly Hall (16,618); Champaign, IL
3/08/08; BTN		Minnesota	W 67–58	13–18 (5–13)	Assembly Hall (16,618); Champaign, IL
Big Ten tournament
3/13/08; ESPN2	(10)	vs. (7) Penn State; Big Ten tournament First Round	W 64–63	14–18	Conseco Fieldhouse (13,852); Indianapolis, IN
3/14/08; BTN	(10)	vs. (2) No. 17 Purdue; Big Ten tournament quarterfinal	W 74–67 ^{OT}	15–18	Conseco Fieldhouse (18,691); Indianapolis, IN
3/15/08; CBS	(10)	vs. (6) Minnesota; Big Ten tournament semifinal	W 54–50	16–18	Conseco Fieldhouse (17,520); Indianapolis, IN
3/16/08; CBS	(10)	vs. (1) No. 8 Wisconsin; Big Ten tournament Championship	L 48–61	16–19	Conseco Fieldhouse (14,579); Indianapolis, IN
*Non-conference game. ^{#}Rankings from AP Poll. (#) Tournament seedings in parentheses. All times are in Central Time.

== Season statistics ==
Legend
GP	Games played	GS	Games started	Avg	Average per game
FG	Field-goals made	FGA	Field-goal attempts	Off	Offensive rebounds
Def	Defensive rebounds	A	Assists	TO	Turnovers
Blk	Blocks	Stl	Steals	High	Team high

Individual Player Statistics
			Minutes		Scoring		Total FGs			3-point FGs			Free-Throws			Rebounds							
Player	GP	GS	Tot	Avg	Pts	Avg	FG	FGA	Pct	3FG	3FA	Pct	FT	FTA	Pct	Off	Def	Tot	Avg	A	TO	Blk	Stl
Pruitt, Shaun	34	33	919	27.0	427	12.6	163	285	.572	0	0	.000	101	179	.564	107	141	248	7.3	27	73	20	16
Meacham, Trent	34	31	1005	29.6	345	10.1	109	265	.411	74	185	.400	53	71	.746	9	73	82	2.4	79	50	3	24
Randle, Brian	33	32	838	25.4	309	9.4	117	254	.461	8	39	.205	67	112	.598	68	114	182	5.5	46	56	16	21
McCamey, Demetri	35	17	956	27.3	287	8.2	100	275	.364	50	147	.340	37	59	.627	22	79	101	2.9	115	87	3	18
Brock, Calvin	35	16	775	22.1	258	7.4	100	220	.455	17	46	.370	41	62	.661	54	77	131	3.7	46	50	8	31
Frazier, Chester	34	29	1136	33.4	166	4.9	57	169	.337	25	91	.275	27	52	.519	35	130	165	4.9	122	76	5	28
Alexander, Rodney	31	15	424	13.7	143	4.6	49	126	.389	11	57	.193	34	48	.708	38	52	90	2.9	11	25	4	11
Tisdale, Mike	35	2	363	10.4	127	3.6	53	110	.482	2	12	.167	19	30	.633	28	30	58	1.7	9	14	15	4
Davis, Mike	34	0	355	10.4	87	2.6	36	82	.439	0	0	.000	15	32	.469	20	41	61	1.8	9	13	14	5
Cole, Bill	12	0	81	6.8	28	2.3	11	21	.524	3	10	.300	3	7	.429	7	10	17	1.4	2	7	6	4
Holdren, Steve	14	0	97	6.9	17	1.2	5	19	.263	3	15	.200	4	7	.571	1	10	11	0.8	7	2	0	2
Jordan, Jeff	26	0	139	5.3	26	1.0	7	24	.292	1	3	.333	11	18	.611	2	10	12	0.5	9	12	0	6
Hicks, Chris	10	0	13	1.3	7	0.7	2	9	.222	2	9	.222	1	2	.500	0	0	0	0.0	0	1	0	1
Semrau, Richard	8		19	2.4	0	0.0	0	1	.000	0	0	.000	0	0	.000	1	4	5	0.6	0	1	0	0
Carlwell, Brian	3		5	1.7	0	0.0	0	0	.000	0	0	.000	0	0	.000	0	0	0	0.0	0	0	0	0
Team																440	826	1266			478		
Total	35		7125		2227	63.6	809	1860	.435	196	614	.319	413	679	.608	440	826	1266	36.2	482	478	94	171
Opponents	35		7125		2139	61.1	720	1806	.399	215	641	.335	484	672	.720	352	748	1100	31.4	380	451	111	191

== See also ==
- Illinois Fighting Illini men's basketball
- 2008 Big Ten Conference men's basketball tournament
