= 2007–08 Big Ten Conference men's basketball season =

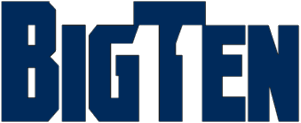
- League: NCAA Division I
- Sport: Basketball
- Duration: November 2007 through March 2008
- Teams: 11
- TV partner(s): Big Ten Network, ESPN, CBS

2007–08 NCAA Division I season
- Champion: Wisconsin (16–2)
- Runners-up: Purdue (15–3)
- Season MVP: D.J. White - IU
- Top scorer: Eric Gordon - IU

Tournament
- Venue: Conseco Fieldhouse, Indianapolis, Indiana
- Champions: Wisconsin
- Runners-up: Illinois
- Finals MVP: Marcus Landry - WIS

Basketball seasons
- ← 06–07 08–09 →

2007–08 Big Ten Conference men's basketball standings
	Conf.				Overall
Team	W		L	PCT	W		L	PCT
No. 6 Wisconsin†	16	–	2	.889	31	–	5	.861
No. 20 Purdue	15	–	3	.833	25	–	9	.735
Indiana	14	–	4	.778	25	–	8	.758
No. 18 Michigan State	12	–	6	.667	27	–	9	.750
Ohio State	10	–	8	.556	24	–	13	.649
Minnesota	8	–	10	.444	20	–	14	.588
Penn State	7	–	11	.389	15	–	16	.484
Iowa	6	–	12	.333	13	–	19	.406
Illinois	5	–	13	.278	16	–	19	.457
Michigan	5	–	13	.278	10	–	22	.313
Northwestern	1	–	17	.056	8	–	22	.267
† 2008 Big Ten tournament winner As of March 23, 2008; Rankings from AP poll

The 2007–08 Big Ten Conference men's basketball season began with practices in October, 2007 followed by the 2007–08 NCAA Division I men's basketball season in November. The conference season began in January, 2008 and concluded in March. The season marked the 103rd season of Big Ten play.

Wisconsin won the Big Ten Conference regular season championship by one game over Purdue. Indiana finished in third with Michigan State in fourth.

Indiana's D.J. White was named Big Ten Player of the Year. Purdue's Matt Painter was named Coach of the Year.

The Big Ten tournament was held from March 13–16, 2008 at Conseco Fieldhouse in Indianapolis, Indiana. Wisconsin won the tournament championship by defeating surprise championship participant No. 10-seeded Illinois. As a result of the win, Wisconsin received the conference's automatic bid to the NCAA tournament.

Four Big Ten teams (Wisconsin, Purdue, Indiana, and Michigan State) were invited to the NCAA Tournament. Two teams, Wisconsin and Michigan State, advance to the Sweet Sixteen, both losing in that round. Ohio State and Minnesota received bids to the National Invitation Tournament with Ohio State winning the tournament.

== Preseason ==
=== All-Big Ten players ===
The following players were chosen as preseason All-Big Ten by the media.

Shaun Pruitt, ILL, SR, C
D.J. White, IND, SR, F
Drew Neitzel, MSU, SR, G (Player of the Year)
Jamar Butler, OSU, SR, G
Geary Claxton, PSU, SR, G/F

=== Teams ===
The following teams were selected as the top teams in the conference by the media.

1. Michigan State
2. Indiana
3. Ohio State

== Regular season ==
=== Early-season tournaments ===
==== ACC–Big Ten Challenge ====
Date	Time	ACC team	B1G team	Score	Location	Television	Attendance	Challenge leader
Nov 26	7:00 pm	Wake Forest	Iowa	56–47	Carver–Hawkeye Arena • Iowa City, Iowa	ESPN2	9,120	ACC (1–0)
Nov 27	7:00 pm	Georgia Tech	No. 15 Indiana	83–79	Assembly Hall • Bloomington, Indiana	ESPN	17,230	Tied (1–1)
Nov 27	7:30 pm	Florida State	Minnesota	75–61	Donald L. Tucker Center • Tallahassee, Florida	ESPN2	9,349	ACC (2–1)
Nov 27	8:00 pm	Virginia	Northwestern	94–52	John Paul Jones Arena • Charlottesville, Virginia	ESPNU		ACC (3–1)
Nov 27	9:00 pm	No. 7 Duke	No. 20 Wisconsin	82–58	Cameron Indoor Stadium • Durham, North Carolina	ESPN	9,314	ACC (4–1)
Nov 27	9:30 pm	No. 18 Clemson	Purdue	61–58	Littlejohn Coliseum • Clemson, South Carolina	ESPN2	7,350	ACC (5–1)
Nov 28	7:00 pm	NC State	No. 10 Michigan State	81–58	Breslin Center • East Lansing, Michigan	ESPN	14,759	ACC (5–2)
Nov 28	7:30 pm	Maryland	Illinois	69–61	Comcast Center • College Park, Maryland	ESPN2	17,950	ACC (6–2)
Nov 28	8:00 pm	Boston College	Michigan	77–64	Crisler Arena • Ann Arbor, Michigan	ESPNU	8,716	ACC (7–2)
Nov 28	9:00 pm	No. 1 North Carolina	Ohio State	66–55	Value City Arena • Columbus, Ohio	ESPN		ACC (8–2)
Nov 28	9:30 pm	Virginia Tech	Penn State	66–61	Bryce Jordan Center • University Park, Pennsylvania	ESPN2		ACC (8–3)
WINNERS ARE IN BOLD. Game Times in EST. Rankings from AP Poll (Nov. 26). Miami did not play due to the ACC having one more team than the B1G.

=== Final standings ===
Team	B10 Conference	B10 %	B10 Home	B10 Road	All Games	All Games %	All Home	All Road	All Neutral
Wisconsin	16–2	.889	8–1	8–1	31–5	.861	16–2	10–2	5–1
Purdue	15–3	.833	9–0	6–3	25–9	.735	16–1	6–5	3–3
Indiana	14–4	.778	8–1	6–3	25–8	.758	17–2	7–3	1–3
Michigan State	12–6	.667	9–0	3–6	27–9	.750	17–0	4–6	6–3
Ohio State	10–8	.556	7–2	3–6	24–13	.649	17–3	4–8	3–2
Minnesota	8–10	.444	5–4	3–6	20–14	.588	12–5	4–8	4–1
Penn State	7–11	.389	5–4	2–7	15–16	.484	13–4	2–8	0–4
Iowa	6–12	.333	4–5	2–7	13–19	.406	10–8	3–8	0–3
Illinois	5–13	.278	3–6	2–7	16–19	.457	7–7	3–9	6–3
Michigan	5–13	.278	3–6	2–7	10–22	.313	6–9	2–10	2–3
Northwestern	1–17	.056	0–9	1–8	8–22	.452	5–11	3–10	0–1

=== Statistical leaders ===
Points per game			Rebounds per game			Assists per game			Steals per game		
Player	School	PPG	Player	School	RPG	Player	School	APG	Player	School	SPG
Eric Gordon	IND	20.9	D. J. White	IND	10.3	Jamar Butler	OSU	5.9	Chris Kramer	PUR	2.3
D. J. White	IND	17.4	Goran Suton	MSU	8.2	Travis Walton	MSU	4.3	Al Nolen	MINN	1.9
Manny Harris	MICH	16.1	Shaun Pruitt	ILL	7.3	Michael Thompson	NU	4.3	Craig Moore	NU	1.8
Jamar Butler	OSU	15.0	Jamarcus Ellis	IND	7.0	Drew Neitzel	MSU	4.0	Trevon Hughes	WIS	1.8
Kosta Koufos	OSU	14.4	Kosta Koufos	OSU	6.7	Kalin Lucas	MSU	3.8	Damian Johnson	MINN	1.7

Blocked shots per game			Field goal percentage			Three-point FG percentage			Free throw percentage		
Player	School	BPG	Player	School	FG%	Player	School	3FG%	Player	School	FT%
Ekpe Udoh	MICH	2.9	D. J. White	IND	60.5	Armon Bassett	IND	45.4	Jamar Butler	OSU	94.3
Kosta Koufos	OSU	1.8	Othello Hunter	OSU	59.6	Robbie Hummel	PUR	44.7	Jason Bohannon	WIS	86.7
Drew Naymick	MSU	1.7	Shaun Pruitt	ILL	57.2	Keaton Grant	PUR	44.0	Robbie Hummel	PUR	86.5
D. J. White	IND	1.6	Raymar Morgan	MSU	55.8	E'Twaun Moore	PUR	43.4	Drew Neitzel	MSU	86.0
Othello Hunter	OSU	1.5	Goran Suton	MSU	55.1	Michael Thompson	NU	43.3	Keaton Grant	PUR	85.1

=== Players of the week ===
Throughout the conference regular season, the Big Ten offices name a player of the week each Monday.

Week	Player of the week
November 12, 2007	DeShawn Sims, MICH
November 19, 2007	Eric Gordon, IND
November 19, 2007	Raymar Morgan, MSU
November 26, 2007	Kosta Koufos, OSU
December 3, 2007	D. J. White, IND
December 10, 2007	D. J. White, IND
December 17, 2007	Geary Claxton, PSU
December 24, 07	Shaun Pruitt, ILL
December 24, 07	Dan Coleman, MINN
December 31, 2007	Brian Butch, WIS
January 7, 2008	Raymar Morgan, MSU
January 7, 2008	Geary Claxton, PSU
January 14, 2008	D. J. White, IND
January 21, 2008	Keaton Grant, PUR
January 28, 2008	Drew Neitzel, MSU
February 4, 2008	D. J. White, IND
February 4, 2008	E'Twaun Moore, PUR
February 11, 2008	Robbie Hummel, PUR
February 18, 2008	Manny Harris, MICH
February 25, 2008	Cyrus Tate, IA
March 3, 2008	Goran Suton, MSU
March 10, 2008	Jamar Butler, OSU

== All-Big Ten Conference honors and awards ==
Two sets of conference award winners are recognized by the Big Ten – one selected by league coaches and one selected by the media.

Honor	Coaches	Media
Player of the Year	D. J. White, IND	D. J. White, IND
Coach of the Year	Matt Painter, PUR	Matt Painter, PUR
Freshman of the Year	Eric Gordon, IND	Eric Gordon, IND
Defensive Player of the Year	Chris Kramer, PUR	None Selected
Sixth Man of the Year	Jason Bohannon, WIS	None Selected
All-Big Ten First Team	Eric Gordon, IND	Eric Gordon, IND
All-Big Ten First Team	D. J. White, IND	D. J. White, IND
All-Big Ten First Team	Drew Neitzel, MSU	Jamar Butler, OSU
All-Big Ten First Team	Robbie Hummel, PUR	Robbie Hummel, PUR
All-Big Ten First Team	Brian Butch, WIS	Brian Butch, WIS
All-Big Ten Second Team	Manny Harris, MICH	Manny Harris, MICH
All-Big Ten Second Team	Raymar Morgan, MSU	Raymar Morgan, MSU
All-Big Ten Second Team	Jamar Butler, OSU	Drew Neitzel, MSU
All-Big Ten Second Team	E'Twaun Moore, PUR	E'Twaun Moore, PUR
All-Big Ten Second Team	Marcus Landry, WIS	Michael Flowers, WIS
All Big Ten Third Team	Armon Bassett, IND	Shaun Pruitt, ILL
All Big Ten Third Team	Tony Freeman, IA	Armon Bassett, IND
All Big Ten Third Team	Lawrence McKenzie, MINN	Kosta Koufos, OSU
All Big Ten Third Team	Kosta Koufos, OSU	Jamelle Cornley, PSU
All Big Ten Third Team	Michael Flowers, WIS	Chris Kramer, PUR
All Big Ten Third Team		Marcus Landry, WIS
All-Big Ten Honorable Mention	Shaun Pruitt, ILL	Jamarcus Ellis, IND
All-Big Ten Honorable Mention	DeShawn Sims, MICH	Tony Freeman, IA
All-Big Ten Honorable Mention	Kalin Lucas, MSU	Kalin Lucas, MSU
All-Big Ten Honorable Mention	Dan Coleman, MINN	Dan Coleman, MINN
All-Big Ten Honorable Mention	Kevin Coble, NU	Lawrence McKenzie, MINN
All-Big Ten Honorable Mention	Jamelle Cornley, PSU	Kevin Coble, NU
All-Big Ten Honorable Mention	Keaton Grant, PUR	Craig Moore, NU
All-Big Ten Honorable Mention	Chris Kramer, PUR	Keaton Grant, PUR
All-Big Ten Honorable Mention	Trevon Hughes, WIS	Trevon Hughes, WIS
All-Freshman Team	Eric Gordon, IND	Not Selected
All-Freshman Team	Manny Harris, MICH	Not Selected
All-Freshman Team	Kosta Koufos, OSU	Not Selected
All-Freshman Team	Robbie Hummel, PUR	Not Selected
All-Freshman Team	E'Twaun Moore, PUR	Not Selected
All Defensive Team	Ekpe Udoh, MICH	Not Selected
All Defensive Team	Travis Walton, MSU	Not Selected
All Defensive Team	Chris Kramer, PUR	Not Selected
All Defensive Team	Michael Flowers, WIS	Not Selected
All Defensive Team	Joe Krabbenhoft, WIS	Not Selected

== Postseason ==
=== Big Ten tournament ===
==== Bracket ====
Opening round March 13
8	Iowa	47
9	Michigan	55
7	Penn State	63
10	Illinois	64
6	Minnesota	55
11	Northwestern	52

Quarterfinals; March 14
1	Wisconsin	51
9	Michigan	34
4	Michigan State	67
5	Ohio State	60
2	Purdue	67
10	Illinois	74
3	Indiana	58
6	Minnesota	59

Semifinals; March 15
1	Wisconsin	65
4	Michigan State	63
10	Illinois	54
6	Minnesota	50

Championship; March 16
1	Wisconsin	61
10	Illinois	48

=== NCAA Tournament ===
Team	Bid Type	Seed	Results
Wisconsin	Automatic	3	Won First Round vs. No. 14 Cal St. Fullerton 71–56; Won Second Round vs. No. 11 Kansas State 72–55; Lost Sweet 16 vs. #10 Davidson 73–56
Michigan State	At-large	5	Won First Round vs. #12 Temple 72–61; Won Second Round vs. #4 Pittsburgh 65–54; Lost Sweet 16 vs. #1 Memphis 92–74
Purdue	At-large	6	Won First Round vs. #11 Baylor 90–79; Lost Second Round vs. #3 Xavier 85–78
Indiana	At-large	8	Lost First Round vs. #9 Arkansas 86–72

=== NIT ===
Team	Bid Type	Seed	Results
Ohio State	At-large	1	Won First Round vs. #8 UNC Asheville 84–66; Won Second Round vs. #4 California 73–56; Won Quarterfinals vs. #3 Dayton 74–63; Won NIT Semifinals vs. #2 Mississippi 81–69; Won NIT Final vs. #2 Massachusetts 92–85
Minnesota	At-large	4	Lost First Round vs. #5 Maryland 68–58

=== 2008 NBA draft ===
The following Big Ten players were selected in the 2008 NBA draft:

Round	Pick	Player	Position	Nationality	Team	School/club team
1	7	Eric Gordon	SG	United States	Los Angeles Clippers	Indiana (Fr.)
1	23	Kosta Koufos	C	Greece	Utah Jazz	Ohio State (Fr.)
1	29	D.J. White	SG	United States	Detroit Pistons (traded to Seattle)	Indiana (Sr.)
