= 2007–08 Michigan State Spartans men's basketball team =

American college basketball season

2007–08 Michigan State Spartans men's basketball

NCAA tournament, Sweet Sixteen
- Conference: Big Ten Conference

Ranking
- Coaches: No. 13
- AP: No. 18
- Record: 27–9 (12–6 Big Ten)
- Head coach: Tom Izzo (13th season)
- Associate head coach: Mark Montgomery (7th season)
- Assistant coaches: Dwayne Stephens (5th season); Mike Garland (1st season)
- Captains: Drew Neitzel; Travis Walton
- Home arena: Breslin Center

2007–08 Big Ten Conference men's basketball standings
	Conf.				Overall
Team	W		L	PCT	W		L	PCT
No. 6 Wisconsin†	16	–	2	.889	31	–	5	.861
No. 20 Purdue	15	–	3	.833	25	–	9	.735
Indiana	14	–	4	.778	25	–	8	.758
No. 18 Michigan State	12	–	6	.667	27	–	9	.750
Ohio State	10	–	8	.556	24	–	13	.649
Minnesota	8	–	10	.444	20	–	14	.588
Penn State	7	–	11	.389	15	–	16	.484
Iowa	6	–	12	.333	13	–	19	.406
Illinois	5	–	13	.278	16	–	19	.457
Michigan	5	–	13	.278	10	–	22	.313
Northwestern	1	–	17	.056	8	–	22	.267
† 2008 Big Ten tournament winner As of March 23, 2008; Rankings from AP poll

The 2007–08 Michigan State Spartans men's basketball team represented Michigan State University in the 2007–08 NCAA Division I men's basketball season. They played their home games at Breslin Center in East Lansing, Michigan and were coached by 13th-year head coach, Tom Izzo. MSU finished the season 27–9, 12–6 to finish in fourth place in Big Ten play. They defeated Ohio State in the quarterfinals of the Big Ten tournament before losing to No. 1-seeded Wisconsin in the semifinals. They received an at-large bid to the NCAA tournament, their 11th consecutive appearance in the NCAA Tournament, as the No. 5 seed in the South region. They defeated Temple in the First Round and upset No. 4-seeded Pittsburgh to reach the Sweet Sixteen. There they lost to No. 2-ranked Memphis.

== Previous season ==
The Spartans finished the 2006–07 season with an overall record of 23–12, 8–8 in Big Ten play to finish in seventh place. Michigan State received a No. 9 seed in the NCAA tournament, their 10th straight trip to the Tournament, and advanced to the Second Round before losing to North Carolina.

== Offseason ==
=== Recruiting class ===
College recruiting
Name	Hometown	School	Height	Weight	Commit date
Kalin Lucas; No. 6 PG	Orchard Lake, Michigan	St. Mary's High School	6 ft 0 in (1.83 m)	172 lb (78 kg)	Dec 29, 2005
Kalin Lucas; No. 6 PG	Recruit ratings: Rivals: (97)				
Durrell Summers; No. 14 SG	Redford, Michigan	Covenant Christian	6 ft 5 in (1.96 m)	190 lb (86 kg)	Jan 25, 2006
Durrell Summers; No. 14 SG	Recruit ratings: Rivals: (96)				
Chris Allen; No. 16 SG	Lawrenceville, Georgia	Meadowcreek High School	6 ft 3 in (1.91 m)	185 lb (84 kg)	Jan 9, 2006
Chris Allen; No. 16 SG	Recruit ratings: Rivals: (96)				
Austin Thornton; SF	Sand Lake, Michigan	Cedar Springs	6 ft 5 in (1.96 m)	190 lb (86 kg)	Feb 16, 2007
Austin Thornton; SF	Recruit ratings: Rivals: (N/A)				
Overall recruit ranking:
Note: In many cases, Scout, Rivals, 247Sports, On3, and ESPN may conflict in their listings of height and weight.; In these cases, the average was taken. ESPN grades are on a 100-point scale.; Sources:

== Season summary ==
The Spartans were led by senior Drew Neitzel (13.9 points and 4 rebounds per game), sophomore Raymar Morgan (14.0 points and 6.1 rebounds per game), and freshman Kalin Lucas (10.3 points and 3.8 assists per game).

Michigan State began the season ranked No. 8 in the country and participated in the CBE Classic, losing to No. 2 UCLA in the finals. They cruised through the remaining non-conference schedule with wins over No. 24 NC State, No. 20 BYU, and No. 4 Texas, finishing 12–1 and ranked No. 6 in the country.

MSU won six of their first seven Big Ten games, their lone loss an ugly 43–36 loss to Iowa on the road. They lost four of their next seven games thereafter at Penn State, at No. 19 Purdue, at No. 13 Indiana, and at No. 10 Wisconsin. They avenged their loss to Indiana by blowing them out 103–74 at the Breslin Center on March 2 after Indiana head coach Kelvin Sampson had resigned. They finished with a loss at Ohio State to finish in fourth place in the Big Ten with a record of 12–6 record and 24–7 overall. They finished the season ranked 18th in the country.

As the No. 4 seed tn the Big Ten tournament, they beat Ohio State 67–60 led by Drew Netizel's season-high 28 points. In the semifinals, MSU led by as many as 12 in the second half, they were defeated by two points by No. 8 Wisconsin. The Spartans were called for 30 fouls in the game and had four players foul out.

The Spartans received an at-large bid to the NCAA tournament to mark their 11th consecutive trip to the Tournament under Tom Izzo. As a No. 5 seed, the Spartans, led by Raymar Morgan's 15 points, beat No. 12-seeded Temple 72–61. In the Second Round, the Spartans looked to advance to the Sweet Sixteen for the seventh time in 11 years. Led by Drew Neitzel's 21 points and Kalin Lucas' 19, the Spartans overcame No. 17 Pittsburgh to move on to the Sweet Sixteen. In the Sweet Sixteen, the Spartans faced No. 2-ranked Memphis. Led by Derrick Rose's 27 points, the Tigers routed the Spartans, leading 50–20 at the half and cruising to 18-point win over MSU. Goran Suton led the Spartans with 23 points and Chris Allen had 20. It marked senior Drew Neitzel's final game for the Spartans.

== Roster ==
2007-

2008–00 Michigan State Spartans men's basketball team

Players
Coaches

Pos.	#	Name	Height	Weight	Year	Previous school	Hometown
G	3	Chris Allen	6 ft 3 in (1.91 m)	190 lb (86 kg)	Fr	Meadowcreek	Lawrenceville, Georgia
F	10	John Crandell	6 ft 8 in (2.03 m)	210 lb (95 kg)	So	Rochester Adams	Rochester, Michigan
G	11	Isaiah Dahlman	6 ft 6 in (1.98 m)	185 lb (84 kg)	So	Braham Area	Braham, Minnesota
F	41	Marquise Gray	6 ft 8 in (2.03 m)	235 lb (107 kg)	RS Jr	Beecher	Flint, Michigan
C	40	Tom Herzog	7 ft 0 in (2.13 m)	230 lb (104 kg)	RS Fr	Powers	Flint, Michigan
C	00	Idong Ibok	6 ft 11 in (2.11 m)	255 lb (116 kg)	RS Jr	Montverde (Fla) Academy	Lagos, Nigeria
G	20	Mike Kebler	6 ft 3 in (1.91 m)	195 lb (88 kg)	Fr	Okemos	Okemos, Michigan
G	1	Kalin Lucas	6 ft 0 in (1.83 m)	165 lb (75 kg)	Fr	Orchard Lake St. Mary's	Sterling Heights, Michigan
F	2	Raymar Morgan	6 ft 7 in (2.01 m)	220 lb (100 kg)	So	McKinley	Canton, Ohio
F	34	Drew Naymick	6 ft 10 in (2.08 m)	245 lb (111 kg)	RS Jr	North Muskegon	Muskegon, Michigan
G	11	Drew Neitzel	6 ft 0 in (1.83 m)	180 lb (82 kg)	Sr	Wyoming Park	Grand Rapids, Michigan
G	15	Durrell Summers	6 ft 5 in (1.96 m)	195 lb (88 kg)	Fr	Redford Covenant Christian	Detroit, Michigan
F	14	Goran Suton	6 ft 10 in (2.08 m)	245 lb (111 kg)	RS Jr	Everett	Lansing, Michigan
G	13	Austin Thornton	6 ft 5 in (1.96 m)	195 lb (88 kg)	Fr	Cedar Springs	Sand Lake, Michigan
G	5	Travis Walton	6 ft 2 in (1.88 m)	195 lb (88 kg)	Jr	Lima Senior	Lima, Ohio

Head coach

- Tom Izzo (Northern Michigan)

Assistant coach(es)

- Mark Montgomery (Michigan State)
- Dwayne Stephens (Michigan State)
- Mike Garland (Northern Michigan)

Legend

- (C) Team captain
- (S) Suspended
- (I) Ineligible
- (W) Walk-on
- Injured
- Current redshirt

Roster
Last update: 2016-02-10

== Schedule and results ==
Date time, TV	Rank^{#}	Opponent^{#}	Result	Record	High points	High rebounds	High assists	Site (attendance) city, state
Exhibition
Nov 02, 2007*; 7:00 pm, BTN	No. 8	Grand Valley State	L 82–85 ^{2OT}		15 – Allen	8 – Gray	4 – Lucas/Walton	Breslin Center (14,759); East Lansing, MI
Nov 07, 2007*; 7:00 pm, BTN	No. 8	Michigan Tech	W 61–55		16 – Lucas	8 – Suton	4 – Neitzel	Breslin Center (14,759); East Lansing, MI
Non-conference regular season
Nov 13, 2007*; 7:00 pm, ESPNU	No. 12	Chicago State; CBE Classic	W 86–53	1–0	25 – Morgan	15 – Morgan	8 – Neitzel	Breslin Center (14,759); East Lansing, I
Nov 14, 2007*; 7:00 pm	No. 12	Louisiana-Monroe; CBE Classic	W 83–65	2–0	17 – Allen	14 – Morgan	5 – Neitzel	Breslin Center (14,759); East Lansing, MI
Nov 19, 2007*; 9:30 pm, ESPNU	No. 10	vs. Missouri; CBE Classic semifinals	W 86–83	3–0	21 – Neitzel	9 – Suton	5 – Walton	Sprint Center (18,022); Kansas City, MO
Nov 20, 2007*; 10:00 pm, ESPN2	No. 11	vs. No. 2 UCLA; CBE Classic championship	L 63–68	3–1	13 – Neitzel	6 – Gray	4 – Walton	Sprint Center (16,737); Kansas City, MO
Nov 24, 2007*; 4:00 pm, BTN	No. 10	Oakland	W 75–71	4–1	20 – Morgan	20 – Suton	6 – Neitzel	Breslin Center (14,759); East Lansing, MI
Nov 28, 2007*; 7:00 pm, ESPN	No. 10	NC State; ACC–Big Ten Challenge	W 81–58	5–1	17 – Neitzel	12 – Suton	7 – Walton	Breslin Center (14,759); East Lansing, MI
Dec 1, 2007*; 7:00 pm, BTN	No. 10	Jacksonville	W 80–51	6–1	24 – Morgan	7 – Morgan	7 – Neitzel	Breslin Center (14,759); East Lansing, MI
Dec 04, 2007*; 9:00 pm, ESPNU	No. 9	at Bradley	W 66–61	7–1	15 – Morgan	11 – Suton	5 – Neitzel/Walton	Carver Arena (11,597); Peoria, Il
Dec 8, 2007*; 4:00 pm, Versus†	No. 9	at No. 20 BYU	W 68–61	8–1	15 – Morgan/Neitzel	13 – Suton	3 – Walton	EnergySolutions Arena (16,412); Salt Lake City, UT
Dec 15, 2007*; 5:30 pm, ESPNU	No. 9	IPFW	W 79–57	9–1	18 – Neitzel	7 – Morgan	5 – Netizel	Breslin Center (14,759); East Lansing, MI
Dec 19, 2007*; 8:00 pm, BTN	No. 9	San Jose State	W 85–45	10–1	16 – Morgan/Summers	7 – Summers/Suton	10 – Walton	Breslin Center (14,759); East Lansing, MI
Dec 22, 2007*; 6:30 pm, ESPN2	No. 9	vs. No. 4 Texas; Spartan Clash	W 78–72	11–1	18 – Lucas/Morgan	9 – Suton	6 – Lucas	The Palace of Auburn Hills (22,076); Auburn Hills, MI
Dec 29, 2007*; 4:00 pm, BTN	No. 7	Green Bay	W 93–75	12–1	24 – Morgan	8 – Morgan	11 – Walton	Breslin Center (14,759); East Lansing, MI
Big Ten regular season
Jan 5, 2008; 8:00 pm, BTN	No. 6	Minnesota	W 65–59	13–1 (1–0)	31 – Morgan	10 – Morgan	7 – Neitzel	Breslin Center (14,759); East Lansing, MI
Jan 8, 2008; 9:00 pm, BTN	No. 6	Purdue	W 78–75	14–1 (2–0)	16 – Lucas	10 – Suton	5 – Lucas/Neitzel	Breslin Center (14,759); East Lansing, MI
Jan 12, 2008; 8:30 pm, BTN	No. 6	at Iowa	L 36–43	14–2 (2–1)	10 – Morgan/Neitzel	11 – Suton	6 – Neitzel	Carver–Hawkeye Arena (13,044); Iowa City, IA
Jan 15, 2008; 7:00 pm, ESPN	No. 9	Ohio State	W 66–60	15–2 (3–1)	13 – Lucas/Neitzel	9 – Suton	5 – Lucas/Neitzel	Breslin Center (14,759); East Lansing, MI
Jan 20, 2008; 4:00 pm, BTN	No. 9	at Minnesota	W 78–73	16–2 (4–1)	19 – Neitzel	13 – Suton	6 – Walton	Williams Arena (14,625); Minneapolis, MN
Jan 24, 2008; 9:00 pm, ESPN2	No. 7	Northwestern	W 78–62	17–2 (5–1)	23 – Morgan	8 – Morgan/Naymick	6 – Walton	Welsh-Ryan Arena (6,738); Evanston, IL
Jan 27, 2008; 1:00 pm, CBS	No. 7	Michigan; Rivalry	W 77–62	18–2 (6–1)	18 – Lucas/Neitzel	7 – Neitzel/Suton	8 – Walton	Breslin Center (14,759); East Lansing, MI
Jan 30, 2008; 9:00 pm, BTN	No. 8	Illinois	W 51–41	19–2 (7–1)	15 – Neitzel	10 – Suton	5 – Walton	Breslin Center (14,759); East Lansing, MI
Feb 2, 2008; 8:00 pm, BTN	No. 8	at Penn State	L 76–85	19–3 (7–2)	18 – Lucas	9 – Suton	7 – Lucas	Bryce Jordan Center (11,159); University Park, PA
Feb 9, 2008; 7:00 pm, BTN	No. 11	Northwestern	W 70–55	20–3 (8–2)	21 – Neitzel	8 – Naymick	4 – Neitzel	Breslin Center (14,759); East Lansing, MI
Feb 12, 2008; 7:00 pm, ESPN	No. 10	at No. 19 Purdue	L 54–60	20–4 (8–3)	20 – Lucas	7 – Morgan/Suton	4 – Neitzel	Mackey Arena (14,123); West Lafayette, IN
Feb 16, 2008; 9:00 pm, ESPN	No. 10	at No. 13 Indiana	L 61–80	20–5 (8–4)	21 – Neitzel	4 – Morgan/Neitzel	4 – Walton	Assembly Hall (17,400); Bloomington, IN
Feb 20, 2008; 7:00 pm, BTN	No. 19	Penn State	W 86–49	21–5 (9–4)	16 – Morgan	7 – Gray	8 – Lucas	Breslin Center (14,759); East Lansing, MI
Feb 23, 2008; 2:00pm, ESPN	No. 19	Iowa	W 66–52	22–5 (10–4)	16 – Morgan	8 – Naymick	5 – Neitzel	Breslin Center (14,759); East Lansing, MI
Feb 28, 2008; 9:00 pm, ESPN2	No. 19	at No. 10 Wisconsin	L 42–57	22–6 (10–5)	14 – Suton	15 – Suton	3 – Lucas/Neitzel	Kohl Center (17,190); Madison, WI
Mar 2, 2008; 2:00 pm, CBS	No. 19	No. 12 Indiana	W 103–74	23–6 (11–5)	20 – Morgan	9 – Suton	11 – Walton	Breslin Center (14,759); East Lansing, MI
Mar 6, 2008; 9:00 pm, ESPN2	No. 17	at Illinois	W 59–51	24–6 (12–5)	17 – Neitzel	10 – Suton	4 – Neitzel/Suton/Walton	Assembly Hall (16,618); Champaign, IL
Mar 9, 2008; 12:00 pm, BTN	No. 17	at Ohio State	W 63–54	24–7 (12–6)	19 – Morgan	8 – Suton	4 – Lucas	Value City Arena (19,049); Columbus, OH
Big Ten tournament
Mar 14, 2008*; 2:30 pm, ESPN	(4) No. 18	vs. (5) Ohio State quarterfinals	W 67–60	25–7	28 – Neitzel	9 – Suton	5 – Walton	Conseco Fieldhouse (15,355); Indianapolis, IN
Mar 15, 2008*; 1:40 pm, CBS	(4) No. 19	vs. (1) No. 8 Wisconsin semifinals	L 63–65	25–8	26 – Neitzel	7 – Morgan	3 – Lucas	Conseco Fieldhouse (17,520); Indianapolis, IN
NCAA tournament
Mar 20, 2008*; 12:30 pm, CBS	(5 S) No. 20	vs. (12 S) Temple; First Round	W 72–61	26–8	15 – Morgan	9 – Suton	7 – Lucas	Pepsi Center (19,010); Denver, CO
Mar 22, 2008*; 7:10 pm, CBS	(5 S) No. 18	vs. (4 S) No. 17 Pittsburgh; Second Round	W 65–54	27–8	21 – Neitzel	9 – Suton	4 – Neitzel	Pepsi Center (19,299); Denver, CO
Mar 28, 2008*; 9:57 pm, CBS	(5 S) No. 20	vs. (1 S) No. 2 Memphis; Sweet Sixteen	L 74–92	27–9	23 – Suton	9 – Suton	7 – Neitzel	Reliant Stadium (32,931); Houston, TX
*Non-conference game. ^{#}Rankings from AP Poll. (#) Tournament seedings in parentheses. All times are in Eastern Time †Versus was scheduled to air the game, but did not due to a mixup with the MTW conference..

== Player statistics ==
Individual player statistics (Final)
		Scoring		Total FGs			3-point FGs			Free-Throws			Rebounds					
Player	GP	Pts	Avg	FG	FGA	Pct	3FG	3FA	Pct	FT	FTA	Pct	Tot	Avg	A	Stl	Blk	Tov
Allen, Chris	32	202	6.3	70	182	.385	36	100	.360	26	33	.788	39	1.2	20	12	3	29
Crandell, Jon	6	0	0.0	0	0		0	0		0	0		1	0.2	1	0	0	0
Dahlman, Isaiah	19	20	1.1	6	16	.375	3	8	.375	5	8	.625	9	0.5	2	0	0	5
Gray, Marquise	36	156	4.3	65	107	.607	0	0		26	40	.650	132	3.7	12	10	9	45
Herzog, Tom	13	14	1.1	6	14	.429	0	0		2	4	.500	14	1.1	0	1	6	1
Ibok, Idong	26	12	0.5	5	10	.500	0	0		2	5	.400	26	1.0	0	0	10	9
Kebler, Mike	9	2	0.2	1	3	.333	0	1	.000	0	1	.000	4	0.4	0	0	0	0
Lucas, Kalin	36	369	10.3	138	320	.431	20	55	.364	73	95	.795	56	1.6	137	30	1	73
Morgan, Raymar	36	505	14.0	187	335	.558	10	33	.303	121	180	.672	221	6.1	58	33	19	83
Naymick, Drew	36	154	4.3	65	100	.650	0	1	.000	24	31	.774	149	4.1	14	11	60	25
Neitzel, Drew	36	501	13.9	165	407	.405	97	244	.398	74	86	.860	90	2.5	145	35	2	51
Summers, Durrell	36	176	4.9	62	123	.504	11	22	.500	41	55	.745	85	2.4	20	5	7	32
Suton, Goran	36	326	9.1	136	247	.551	2	12	.167	52	67	.776	295	8.2	66	38	33	60
Walton, Travis	36	127	3.5	43	112	.384	0	7	.000	41	56	.732	71	4.3	156	33	2	65

Legend
GP	Games played	Avg	Average per game
FG	Field-goals made	FGA	Field-goal attempts	Tov	Turnovers
Blk	Blocks	Stl	Steals	A	Assists

== Rankings ==
Ranking movements Legend: ██ Increase in ranking ██ Decrease in ranking
	Week																				
Poll	Pre	1	2	3	4	5	6	7	8	9	10	11	12	13	14	15	16	17	18	19	Final
AP	8	12	10	10	9	9	9	7	6	6	11	10	8	11	10	19	19	17	19	18	Not released
Coaches	8	12	11	13	10	10	10	7	6	6	11	10	7	10	9	17	15	18	19	20	13

*AP does not release post-NCAA tournament rankings Source

== Awards and honors ==
- Drew Neitzel – All-Big Ten First Team (Coaches), All-Big Ten Second Team (Media)
- Raymar Morgan – All-Big Ten Second Team
- Kalin Lucas – All-Big Ten Honorable Mention
- Kalin Lucas – Big Ten All-Freshman Team
- Travis Walton – Big Ten All Defensive Team
