= 2007–08 Ohio State Buckeyes men's basketball team =

American college basketball season

2007–08 Ohio State Buckeyes men's basketball

NIT, Champions
- Conference: Big Ten Conference
- Record: 24–13 (10–8 Big Ten)
- Head coach: Thad Matta (4th season)
- Assistant coaches: Alan Major; Archie Miller; John Groce
- Home arena: Value City Arena

2007–08 Big Ten Conference men's basketball standings
	Conf.				Overall
Team	W		L	PCT	W		L	PCT
No. 6 Wisconsin†	16	–	2	.889	31	–	5	.861
No. 20 Purdue	15	–	3	.833	25	–	9	.735
Indiana	14	–	4	.778	25	–	8	.758
No. 18 Michigan State	12	–	6	.667	27	–	9	.750
Ohio State	10	–	8	.556	24	–	13	.649
Minnesota	8	–	10	.444	20	–	14	.588
Penn State	7	–	11	.389	15	–	16	.484
Iowa	6	–	12	.333	13	–	19	.406
Illinois	5	–	13	.278	16	–	19	.457
Michigan	5	–	13	.278	10	–	22	.313
Northwestern	1	–	17	.056	8	–	22	.267
† 2008 Big Ten tournament winner As of March 23, 2008; Rankings from AP poll

The 2007–08 Ohio State Buckeyes men's basketball team represented Ohio State University in the 2007–08 NCAA Division I men's basketball season. The team was led by fourth-year head coach Thad Matta, and played their home games at the Value City Arena, in Columbus, Ohio as members of the Big Ten Conference. They finished in fifth place in the Big Ten, squarely on the NCAA tournament bubble. However, they were not selected, marking the only time in coach Thad Matta's head coaching career his team missed the NCAA tournament while being eligible. The team dominated in the 2008 National Invitation Tournament on their way to a 92–85 victory over Massachusetts in the final.

== Preseason ==
The Buckeyes lost three important players from their 2006–07 NCAA Runners-up team to the NBA draft. Greg Oden, the 2007 Second Team All-American, was selected in the lottery of the 2007 NBA draft, going #1 to the Portland Trail Blazers. Mike Conley Jr. and Daequan Cook also were drafted in the first round, by the Memphis Grizzlies and Philadelphia 76ers, but traded to Miami Heat, respectively. Senior guard Ron Lewis also declared to the draft but went undrafted.

=== Recruiting ===
College recruiting information
Name	Hometown	School	Height	Weight	Commit date
Jon Diebler; SG	Upper Sandusky, OH	Upper Sandusky HS	6 ft 6 in (1.98 m)	200 lb (91 kg)	Sep 23, 2005
Jon Diebler; SG	Recruit ratings: Scout: Rivals: (96)				
Kosta Koufos; PF	Canton, OH	GlenOak HS	7 ft 0 in (2.13 m)	250 lb (110 kg)	May 19, 2006
Kosta Koufos; PF	Recruit ratings: Scout: Rivals: (97)				
Dallas Lauderdale; C	Solon, OH	Solon HS	6 ft 8 in (2.03 m)	235 lb (107 kg)	Jun 1, 2006
Dallas Lauderdale; C	Recruit ratings: Scout: Rivals: (95)				
Evan Turner; SF	Chicago, IL	St. Joseph's HS	6 ft 6 in (1.98 m)	175 lb (79 kg)	Jun 29, 2006
Evan Turner; SF	Recruit ratings: Scout: Rivals: (96)				
Eric Wallace; SF	Winston-Salem, NC	Hargrave Military Academy	6 ft 7 in (2.01 m)	205 lb (93 kg)	Oct 11, 2006
Eric Wallace; SF	Recruit ratings: Scout: Rivals: (91)				
Junior College/Transfers
P. J. Hill; PG	Minneapolis, MN	Midland College	6 ft 2 in (1.88 m)	165 lb (75 kg)	Jul 18, 2007
P. J. Hill; PG	Recruit ratings: Scout:				
Overall recruit ranking: Scout: 7 Rivals: 7
Note: In many cases, Scout, Rivals, 247Sports, On3, and ESPN may conflict in their listings of height and weight.; In these cases, the average was taken. ESPN grades are on a 100-point scale.; Sources: "Ohio State 2007 Basketball Commitments". Rivals.; "2007 Ohio State Basketball Commits". Scout.; "Ohio State Basketball Recruiting 2007". ESPN.; "Scout.com Team Recruiting Rankings". Scout.; "2007 Team Ranking". Rivals.

== Roster ==
2007–08 Ohio State Buckeyes men's basketball team
Players
Coaches

Pos.	#	Name	Height	Weight	Year	Hometown
G	14	Jamar Butler	6 ft 1 in (1.85 m)	195 lb (88 kg)	Sr	Lima, OH
G	33	Jon Diebler	6 ft 6 in (1.98 m)	200 lb (91 kg)	Fr	Upper Sandusky, OH
G	4	P. J. Hill	6 ft 1 in (1.85 m)	165 lb (75 kg)	So	Minneapolis, MN
F	45	Othello Hunter	6 ft 8 in (2.03 m)	225 lb (102 kg)	Sr	Winston-Salem, NC
F/C	31	Kosta Koufos	7 ft 0 in (2.13 m)	265 lb (120 kg)	Fr	Canton, OH
F	52	Dallas Lauderdale	6 ft 8 in (2.03 m)	260 lb (118 kg)	Fr	Solon, OH
G/F	23	David Lighty	6 ft 5 in (1.96 m)	215 lb (98 kg)	So	Cleveland, OH
C	15	Kyle Madsen	6 ft 9 in (2.06 m)	240 lb (109 kg)	RS So	Dublin, OH
G	13	Danny Peters	6 ft 3 in (1.91 m)	175 lb (79 kg)	So	New Albany, OH
F/C	42	Matt Terwilliger	6 ft 9 in (2.06 m)	245 lb (111 kg)	Sr	Troy, OH
G	34	Mark Titus	6 ft 4 in (1.93 m)	210 lb (95 kg)	So	Brownsburg, IN
G/F	21	Evan Turner	6 ft 6 in (1.98 m)	200 lb (91 kg)	Fr	Chicago, IL
G/F	2	Eric Wallace	6 ft 5 in (1.96 m)	215 lb (98 kg)	Fr	Winston-Salem, NC

Head coach

- Thad Matta (Butler)

Assistant coach(es)

- Alan Major (Purdue)
- Archie Miller (NC State)

Strength and conditioning coach(es)

- Dave Richardson (Louisiana–Monroe)

Athletic trainer(s)

- Vince O'Brien (Ohio State)

Legend

- (C) Team captain
- (S) Suspended
- (I) Ineligible
- (W) Walk-on
- Injured
- Current redshirt

Roster
Last update: 2010-03-28

== 2007–08 Schedule ==
Date time, TV	Rank^{#}	Opponent^{#}	Result	Record	Site (attendance) city, state
Exhibition
October 31*, BTN		Ashland	W 88–59		Schottenstein Center; Columbus, OH
November 6*, BTN		Findlay	L 68–70		Schottenstein Center; Columbus, OH
Regular season
November 12*; 9:00 pm, ESPN2		Wisconsin-Green Bay; NIT Season Tip-Off	W 91–68	1–0	Schottenstein Center (13,644); Columbus, OH
November 13*; 9:00 pm, ESPN		Columbia; NIT Season Tip-Off	W 68–54	2–0	Schottenstein Center (13,427); Columbus, OH
November 21*; 9:30 pm, ESPN2		vs. No. 21 Syracuse; NIT Season Tip-Off	W 79–65	3–0	Madison Square Garden (8,388); New York, NY
November 23*; 7:00 pm, ESPN2		vs. No. 15 Texas A&M; NIT Season Tip-Off Championship Game	L 47–70	3–1	Madison Square Garden (6,054); New York, NY
November 25*; 8:00 pm, BTN		VMI	W 90–57	4–1	St. John Arena (6,670); Columbus, OH
November 28*; 9:05 pm, ESPN		No. 1 North Carolina; ACC – Big Ten Challenge	L 55–66	4–2	Schottenstein Center (19,049); Columbus, OH
December 1*; 7:30 pm, ESPNU		at Butler	L 46–65	4–3	Hinkle Fieldhouse (10,000); Indianapolis, IN
December 10*; 8:00 pm, BTN		Coppin State	W 47–39	5–3	Schottenstein Center (15,496); Columbus, OH
December 15*; 12:00 pm, BTN		Presbyterian College	W 87–43	6–3	Schottenstein Center (16,569); Columbus, OH
December 18*; 7:05 pm, STO		vs. Cleveland State	W 80–63	7–3	Quicken Loans Arena (12,715); Cleveland, OH
December 22*; 4:00 pm, CBS		Florida	W 62–49	8–3	Schottenstein Center (19,049); Columbus, OH
December 29*; 11:00 am, BTN		Maryland-Baltimore County	W 92–83	9–3	Schottenstein Center (17,847); Columbus, OH
January 3; 7:00 pm, ESPN		at Illinois	W 74–58	10–3 (1–0)	Assembly Hall (16,618); Champaign, IL
January 6; 12:00 pm, BTN		Northwestern	W 62–51	11–3 (2–0)	Schottenstein Center (18,722); Columbus, OH
January 9; 7:00 pm, BTN		Iowa	W 79–48	12–3 (3–0)	Schottenstein Center (18,473); Columbus, OH
January 12; 4:00 pm, BTN		at Purdue	L 68–75	12–4 (3–1)	Mackey Arena (14,123); West Lafayette, IN
January 15; 7:00 pm, ESPN		at Michigan State	L 60–66	12–5 (3–2)	Breslin Center (14,759); East Lansing, MI
January 19*; 3:30 pm, CBS		at No. 7 Tennessee	L 69–74	12–6 (3–2)	Thompson–Boling Arena (21,784); Knoxville, TN
January 22; 9:00 pm, BTN		Illinois	W 64–58	13–6 (4–2)	Schottenstein Center (19,049); Columbus, OH
January 26; 8:00 pm, BTN		Minnesota	W 76–60	14–6 (5–2)	Schottenstein Center (19,049); Columbus, OH
January 26; 7:00 pm, ESPN		at Penn State	W 68–56	15–6 (6–2)	Bryce Jordan Center (10,956); University Park, PA
February 2; 5:05 pm, BTN		at Iowa	L 48–53	15–7 (6–3)	Carver–Hawkeye Arena (15,235); Iowa City, IA
February 5; 7:00 pm, ESPN		Michigan	W 65–55	16–7 (7–3)	Schottenstein Center (19,049); Columbus, OH
February 10; 1:00 pm, CBS		No. 13 Indiana	L 53–59	16–8 (7–4)	Schottenstein Center (19,049); Columbus, OH
February 13; 8:00 pm, BTN		at Northwestern	W 65–47	17–8 (8–4)	Welsh-Ryan Arena (3,822); Evanston, IL
February 17; 1:00 pm, CBS		at Michigan	L 70–80	17–9 (8–5)	Crisler Arena (13,751); Ann Arbor, MI
February 24; 4:05 pm, CBS		No. 11 Wisconsin	L 53–58	17–10 (8–6)	Schottenstein Center (19,049); Columbus, OH
February 28; 7:00 pm, ESPN		at No. 12 Indiana	L 69–72	17–11 (8–7)	Assembly Hall (17,389); Bloomington, IN
March 1; 4:00 pm, ESPN		at Minnesota	L 57–71	17–12 (8–8)	Williams Arena (13,443); Minneapolis, MN
March 4; 7:00 pm, ESPN		No. 15 Purdue	W 80–77 ^{OT}	18–12 (9–8)	Schottenstein Center (19,049); Columbus, OH
March 9; 12:00 pm, BTN		No. 18 Michigan State	W 63–54	19–12 (10–8)	Schottenstein Center (19,049); Columbus, OH
Big Ten tournament
March 14; 2:35 pm, ESPN		vs. No. 19 Michigan State; Quarterfinals	L 60–67	19–13	Conseco Fieldhouse (15,355); Indianapolis, IN
NIT tournament
March 18; 7:00 pm, ESPN2	No. NR (1)	(8) UNC Asheville; First Round – Ohio State Bracket	W 84–66	20–13	Schottenstein Center (7,117); Columbus, OH
March 24; 7:00 pm, ESPN	No. NR (1)	(4) California; Second Round – Ohio State Bracket	W 73–56	21–13	St. John Arena (13,276); Columbus, OH
March 26; 9:00 pm, ESPN2	No. NR (1)	(3) Dayton; Quarterfinal – Ohio State Bracket	W 74–63	22–13	Schottenstein Center (19,049); Columbus, OH
April 1; 9:00 pm, ESPN2	No. NR (1)	vs. (2) Mississippi; Semifinal	W 81–69	23–13	Madison Square Garden (9,823); New York, NY
April 3; 7:00 pm, ESPN	No. NR (1)	vs. (2) Massachusetts; Championship Game	W 92–85	24–13	Madison Square Garden (8,407); New York, NY
*Non-conference game. ^{#}Rankings from Coaches' Poll. (#) Tournament seedings in parentheses.

== Awards and honors ==
- Kosta Koufos, NIT Most Valuable Player

== Team players drafted into the NBA ==
Round	Pick	Player	NBA Club
1	23	Kosta Koufos	Utah Jazz

== 2008 Recruiting Class ==
College recruiting information
Name	Hometown	School	Height	Weight	Commit date
William Buford; SG	Toledo, OH	Libbey HS	6 ft 5 in (1.96 m)	188 lb (85 kg)	Oct 30, 2006
William Buford; SG	Recruit ratings: Scout: Rivals: (96)				
Anthony Crater; PG	Wolfeboro, NH	Brewster Academy	6 ft 1 in (1.85 m)	170 lb (77 kg)	Nov 27, 2006
Anthony Crater; PG	Recruit ratings: Scout: Rivals: (92)				
B.J. Mullens; C	Canal Winchester, OH	Canal Winchester HS	7 ft 0 in (2.13 m)	260 lb (120 kg)	Mar 28, 2004
B.J. Mullens; C	Recruit ratings: Scout: Rivals: (98)				
Walter Offutt; SG	Indianapolis, IN	Warren Central HS	6 ft 3 in (1.91 m)	175 lb (79 kg)	Mar 10, 2005
Walter Offutt; SG	Recruit ratings: Scout: Rivals: (88)				
Junior College/Transfers
Nicola Kecman; PF	Thatcher, AZ	Eastern Arizona College	6 ft 9 in (2.06 m)	215 lb (98 kg)	Apr 27, 2008
Nicola Kecman; PF	Recruit ratings: Rivals:				
Jeremie Simmons; PG	Flint, MI	Mott Community College	6 ft 2 in (1.88 m)	170 lb (77 kg)	Apr 27, 2008
Jeremie Simmons; PG	Recruit ratings: Rivals:				
Overall recruit ranking: Scout: 2 Rivals: 5
Note: In many cases, Scout, Rivals, 247Sports, On3, and ESPN may conflict in their listings of height and weight.; In these cases, the average was taken. ESPN grades are on a 100-point scale.; Sources: "Ohio State 2008 Basketball Commitments". Rivals.; "2008 Ohio State Basketball Commits". Scout.; "Ohio State Basketball Recruiting 2008". ESPN.; "Scout.com Team Recruiting Rankings". Scout.; "2008 Team Ranking". Rivals.
