= 2007–08 Iowa Hawkeyes men's basketball team =

American college basketball season

2007–08 Iowa Hawkeyes men's basketball
- Conference: Big Ten Conference
- Record: 13–19 (6–12 Big Ten)
- Head coach: Todd Lickliter (1st season)
- Assistant coaches: Joel Cornette; LaVall Jordan; Chad Walthall
- Home arena: Carver-Hawkeye Arena; Capacity: 15,500

2007–08 Big Ten Conference men's basketball standings
	Conf.				Overall
Team	W		L	PCT	W		L	PCT
No. 6 Wisconsin†	16	–	2	.889	31	–	5	.861
No. 20 Purdue	15	–	3	.833	25	–	9	.735
Indiana	14	–	4	.778	25	–	8	.758
No. 18 Michigan State	12	–	6	.667	27	–	9	.750
Ohio State	10	–	8	.556	24	–	13	.649
Minnesota	8	–	10	.444	20	–	14	.588
Penn State	7	–	11	.389	15	–	16	.484
Iowa	6	–	12	.333	13	–	19	.406
Illinois	5	–	13	.278	16	–	19	.457
Michigan	5	–	13	.278	10	–	22	.313
Northwestern	1	–	17	.056	8	–	22	.267
† 2008 Big Ten tournament winner As of March 23, 2008; Rankings from AP poll

The 2007–08 Iowa Hawkeyes men's basketball team represented the University of Iowa and the Iowa Hawkeyes men's basketball program in the 2007–08 college basketball season. Coached by Todd Lickliter, they played their home games at Carver-Hawkeye Arena in Iowa City, Iowa.

== Personnel ==
Note: Flags indicate national team eligibility at FIBA sanctioned events. Players may hold other non-FIBA nationality not displayed.

No.		Position	Player
2	(United States)	C	David Palmer
4	(United States)	G	J.R. Angle
11	(United States)	G	Tony Freeman
15	(United States)	G	Dan Bohall
24	(United States)	G	Justin Johnson
30	(United States)	G	Jeff Peterson
32	(United States)	G	Jake Kelly
44	(United States)	F	Cyrus Tate

No.		Position	Player
50	(United States)	F	Jarryd Cole
52	(Antigua and Barbuda)	F	Kurt Looby
53	(United States)	C	Seth Gorney
Position			Name/s
Head coach:			(United States) Todd Lickliter
Assistants:			Joel Cornette, LaVall Jordan, Chad Walthall

== Schedule ==
Date time, TV	Opponent	Result	Record	Site (attendance) city, state
Exhibition
2007-11-01*; 7:05 pm, –	Simpson	W 56–30	0–0	Carver-Hawkeye Arena (8,990); Iowa City, Iowa
Regular season
2007-11-09*; 8:05 pm, BTN	Idaho State	W 58–43	1–0	Carver-Hawkeye Arena (10,201); Iowa City, Iowa
2007-11-14*; 8:05 pm, BTN	Northern Colorado	W 59–47	2–0	Carver-Hawkeye Arena (8,483); Iowa City, Iowa
2007-11-18*; 1:05 pm, BTN	Florida Gulf Coast	W 62–49	3–0	Carver-Hawkeye Arena (9,183); Iowa City, Iowa
2007-11-20*; 8:05 pm, BTN	Maryland Eastern Shore	W 65–48	4–0	Carver-Hawkeye Arena (8,583); Iowa City, Iowa
2007-11-23*; 6:30 pm, CSTV	vs. Bradley	L 67–56	4–1	SPI Convention Centre (850); South Padre Island, Texas
2007-11-24*; 5:00 pm, –	vs. Utah State	L 75–62	4–2	SPI Convention Centre (900); South Padre Island, Texas
2007-11-26*; 6:05 pm, ESPN2	Wake Forest; ACC–Big Ten Challenge	L 56–47	4–3	Carver-Hawkeye Arena (9,120); Iowa City, Iowa
2007-11-30*; 8:05 pm, BTN	Louisiana-Monroe	L 72–67 ^{OT}	4–4	Carver-Hawkeye Arena (9,158); Iowa City, Iowa
2007-12-01*; 8:05 pm, BTN	Eastern Illinois	W 57–45	5–4	Carver-Hawkeye Arena (9,107); Iowa City, Iowa
2007-12-05*; 8:05 pm, KFXA	at Northern Iowa; Iowa Big Four	W 62–55	6–4	McLeod Center (7,043); Cedar Falls, Iowa
2007-12-08*; 1:00 pm, ESPNU	at Iowa State	L 56–47	6–5	Hilton Coliseum (14,376); Ames, Iowa
2007-12-14*; 7:05 pm, BTN	Drake; Iowa Big Four	L 56–51	6–6	Carver-Hawkeye Arena (9,619); Iowa City, Iowa
2007-12-29*; 8:05 pm, BTN	Southeastern Louisiana	W 57–50	7–6	Carver-Hawkeye Arena (10,806); Iowa City, Iowa
2008-01-02; 8:05 pm, BTN	No. 12 Indiana^{#}	L 79–76	7–7 (0–1)	Carver-Hawkeye Arena (9,890); Iowa City, Iowa
2008-01-05; 11:00 am, BTN	at No. 24 Wisconsin^{#}	L 64–51	7–8 (0–2)	Kohl Center (17,190); Madison, Wisconsin
2008-01-09; 5:05 pm, BTN	at Ohio State	L 79–48	7–9 (0–3)	Value City Arena (18,473); Columbus, Ohio
2008-01-12; 7:35 pm, BTN	No. 6 Michigan State^{#}	W 43–36	8–9 (1–3)	Carver-Hawkeye Arena (13,044); Iowa City, Iowa
2008-01-16; 6:05 pm, BTN	Purdue	L 67–62	8–10 (1–4)	Carver-Hawkeye Arena (9,701); Iowa City, Iowa
2008-01-19; 6:00 pm, BTN	at Michigan	W 68–60	9–10 (2–4)	Crisler Arena (11,638); Ann Arbor, Michigan
2008-01-23; 8:00 pm, BTN	at No. 8 Indiana^{#}	L 65–43	9–11 (2–5)	Assembly Hall (17,269); Bloomington, Indiana
2008-01-26; 5:05 pm, BTN	Penn State	W 64–49	10–11 (3–5)	Carver-Hawkeye Arena (14,572); Iowa City, Iowa
2008-01-30; 6:00 pm, BTN	at Purdue	L 51–50	10–12 (3–6)	Mackey Arena (13,370); West Lafayette, Indiana
2008-02-02; 5:05 pm, BTN	Ohio State	W 53–48	11–12 (4–6)	Carver-Hawkeye Arena (15,235); Iowa City, Iowa
2008-02-06; 8:05 pm, BTN	No. 8 Wisconsin^{#}	L 60–54	11–13 (4–7)	Carver-Hawkeye Arena (12,342); Iowa City, Iowa
2008-02-09; 1:05 pm, ESPN	at Minnesota	L 63–50	11–14 (4–8)	Williams Arena (14,625); Minneapolis, Minnesota
2008-02-14; 8:05 pm, ESPN	Michigan	L 60–52	11–15 (4–9)	Carver-Hawkeye Arena (9,662); Iowa City, Iowa
2008-02-19; 8:05 pm, BTN	Northwestern	W 53–51	12–15 (5–9)	Carver-Hawkeye Arena (9,250); Iowa City, Iowa
2008-02-23; 1:00 pm, ESPN	at No. 17 Michigan State^{#}	L 66–52	12–16 (5–10)	Breslin Center (14,759); East Lansing, Michigan
2008-02-27; 6:05 pm, BTN	at Penn State	L 65–64	12–17 (5–11)	Bryce Jordan Center (6,058); State College, Pennsylvania
2008-03-01; 5:05 pm, BTN	Illinois	L 58–47	12–18 (5–12)	Carver-Hawkeye Arena (15,500); Iowa City, Iowa
2008-03-04; 8:05 pm, BTN	at Northwestern	W 67–62	13–18 (6–12)	Welsh-Ryan Arena (3,523); Evanston, Illinois
Big Ten tournament
2008-03-13; 11:00 am, BTN	vs. Michigan	L 55–47	13–19 (6–12)	Conseco Fieldhouse (–); Indianapolis, Indiana
*Non-conference game. ^{#}Rankings from Coaches Poll. (#) Tournament seedings in parentheses.
