= 2007–08 Michigan Wolverines men's basketball team =

American college basketball season

2007–08 Michigan Wolverines men's basketball
- Conference: Big Ten Conference
- Record: 10–22 (5–13 Big Ten)
- Head coach: John Beilein (1st season)
- Assistant coaches: Jerry Dunn; Mike Jackson; John Mahoney
- MVP: Manny Harris
- Captain: Ron Coleman

2007–08 Big Ten Conference men's basketball standings
	Conf.				Overall
Team	W		L	PCT	W		L	PCT
No. 6 Wisconsin†	16	–	2	.889	31	–	5	.861
No. 20 Purdue	15	–	3	.833	25	–	9	.735
Indiana	14	–	4	.778	25	–	8	.758
No. 18 Michigan State	12	–	6	.667	27	–	9	.750
Ohio State	10	–	8	.556	24	–	13	.649
Minnesota	8	–	10	.444	20	–	14	.588
Penn State	7	–	11	.389	15	–	16	.484
Iowa	6	–	12	.333	13	–	19	.406
Illinois	5	–	13	.278	16	–	19	.457
Michigan	5	–	13	.278	10	–	22	.313
Northwestern	1	–	17	.056	8	–	22	.267
† 2008 Big Ten tournament winner As of March 23, 2008; Rankings from AP poll

The 2007–08 Michigan Wolverines men's basketball team represented the University of Michigan in intercollegiate college basketball during the 2007–08 season. The team played its home games in the Crisler Arena in Ann Arbor, Michigan, and was a member of the Big Ten Conference. Under the direction of head coach John Beilein, the team finished tied for ninth in the Big Ten Conference. The team earned a ninth seed and advanced to the second round of the 2008 Big Ten Conference men's basketball tournament. The team failed to earn an invitation to either the 2008 National Invitation Tournament or the 2008 NCAA Men's Division I Basketball Tournament. The team was unranked for all eighteen weeks of Associated Press Top Twenty-Five Poll, and ended the season unranked in the final USA Today/CNN Poll. Ron Coleman served as team captain, and Manny Harris earned team MVP honors.

The team set the Big Ten conference, single-season record for three-point field goals attempted in conference games with 434. The team would rebreak this record the following season.

Ekpe Udoh led the Big Ten in blocked shots with a 2.67 conference game average and a 2.88 all game average. Overall, Michigan led the Big Ten with a 4.28 blocks per games in conference games. Udoh would later transfer to Baylor University and, as a junior, lead the Big 12 Conference in blocked shots as well.

In the 2008 Big Ten Conference men's basketball tournament at the Conseco Fieldhouse from March 13–16, Michigan was seeded ninth. In the first round, they defeated number 8 Iowa 55–47 before losing to number 1 Wisconsin 51–34 in the second round.

== Team Players Drafted into the NBA ==
Year	Round	Pick	Player	NBA Club
2010	1	6	Ekpe Udoh*	Golden State Warriors

*Transferred to Baylor Bears basketball before being drafted

== 2007 08 Schedule and Results ==
https://mgoblue.com/sports/mens-basketball/schedule/2007-08
