= 2008 Big Ten men's basketball tournament =

- Classification: Division I
- Season: 2007–08
- Teams: 11
- Site: Conseco Fieldhouse; Indianapolis, Indiana
- Champions: Wisconsin Badgers (2nd title)
- Winning coach: Bo Ryan (2nd title)
- MVP: Marcus Landry (Wisconsin)
- Television: BTN, ESPN, ESPN2, and CBS

2007–08 Big Ten Conference men's basketball standings
	Conf.				Overall
Team	W		L	PCT	W		L	PCT
No. 6 Wisconsin†	16	–	2	.889	31	–	5	.861
No. 20 Purdue	15	–	3	.833	25	–	9	.735
Indiana	14	–	4	.778	25	–	8	.758
No. 18 Michigan State	12	–	6	.667	27	–	9	.750
Ohio State	10	–	8	.556	24	–	13	.649
Minnesota	8	–	10	.444	20	–	14	.588
Penn State	7	–	11	.389	15	–	16	.484
Iowa	6	–	12	.333	13	–	19	.406
Illinois	5	–	13	.278	16	–	19	.457
Michigan	5	–	13	.278	10	–	22	.313
Northwestern	1	–	17	.056	8	–	22	.267
† 2008 Big Ten tournament winner As of March 23, 2008; Rankings from AP poll

The 2008 Big Ten men's basketball tournament was played between March 13 and 16, 2008 at Conseco Fieldhouse in Indianapolis, Indiana. It was the eleventh annual Big Ten men's basketball tournament. The championship was won by Wisconsin who defeated Illinois in the championship game. As a result, Wisconsin received the Big Ten's automatic bid to the NCAA tournament. The win marked Wisconsin's second tournament championship in four appearances.

== Seeds ==
All Big Ten schools played in the tournament. Teams were seeded by conference record, with a tiebreaker system used to seed teams with identical conference records. Seeding for the tournament was determined at the close of the regular conference season. The top five teams received a first round bye.

Seed	School	Conference	Tiebreaker 1	Tiebreaker 2	Tiebreaker 3	Tiebreaker 4
1	Wisconsin	16–2				
2	Purdue	15–3				
3	Indiana	14–4				
4	Michigan State	12–6				
5	Ohio State	10–8				
6	Minnesota	8–10				
7	Penn State	7–11				
8	Iowa	6–12				
9	Michigan	5–13	1–1 vs Ill	0–2 vs Wisc	0–2 vs Pur	0–1 vs Ind
10	Illinois	5–13	1–1 vs Mich	0–2 vs Wisc	0–2 vs Pur	0–2 vs Ind
11	Northwestern	1–17				

== Bracket ==
Opening round March 13
8	Iowa	47
9	Michigan	55
7	Penn State	63
10	Illinois	64
6	Minnesota	55
11	Northwestern	52

Quarterfinals; March 14
1	#8 Wisconsin	51
9	Michigan	34
4	#19 Michigan State	67
5	Ohio State	60
2	#17 Purdue	67
10	Illinois	74
3	#22 Indiana	58
6	Minnesota	59

Semifinals; March 15
1	#8 Wisconsin	65
4	#19 Michigan State	63
10	Illinois	54
6	Minnesota	50

Championship; March 16
1	#8 Wisconsin	61
10	Illinois	48

== All-Tournament Team ==
- Marcus Landry, Wisconsin – Big Ten tournament Most Outstanding Player
- Demetri McCamey, Illinois
- Shaun Pruitt, Illinois
- Drew Neitzel, Michigan State
- Michael Flowers, Wisconsin
