= 2007–08 Wisconsin Badgers men's basketball team =

American college basketball season

2007–08 Wisconsin Badgers men's basketball

2008 Big Ten Season & Tournament Champions

NCAA tournament, Sweet Sixteen
- Conference: Big Ten Conference

Ranking
- Coaches: No. 10
- AP: No. 6
- Record: 31–5 (16–2 Big Ten)
- Head coach: Bo Ryan
- Assistant coaches: Greg Gard; Gary Close; Howard Moore
- Home arena: Kohl Center

2007–08 Big Ten Conference men's basketball standings
	Conf.				Overall
Team	W		L	PCT	W		L	PCT
No. 6 Wisconsin†	16	–	2	.889	31	–	5	.861
No. 20 Purdue	15	–	3	.833	25	–	9	.735
Indiana	14	–	4	.778	25	–	8	.758
No. 18 Michigan State	12	–	6	.667	27	–	9	.750
Ohio State	10	–	8	.556	24	–	13	.649
Minnesota	8	–	10	.444	20	–	14	.588
Penn State	7	–	11	.389	15	–	16	.484
Iowa	6	–	12	.333	13	–	19	.406
Illinois	5	–	13	.278	16	–	19	.457
Michigan	5	–	13	.278	10	–	22	.313
Northwestern	1	–	17	.056	8	–	22	.267
† 2008 Big Ten tournament winner As of March 23, 2008; Rankings from AP poll

The 2007–08 Wisconsin Badgers men's basketball team represented University of Wisconsin–Madison. The head coach was Bo Ryan, coaching his seventh season with the Badgers. The team played its home games at the Kohl Center in Madison, Wisconsin, and is a member of the Big Ten Conference. The team finished with a final record of 31–5 which set the school record for wins in a season.

== Season Notes ==
This was the second of back-to-back 30+ win season for Wisconsin. Brian Butch and Michael Flowers were seniors; Marcus Landry and Joe Krabbenhoft were juniors; Trevon Hughes and Jason Bohannon were sophomores. All contributed to the team's success.

Wisconsin won the Big Ten regular season title outright, won the Big Ten tournament championship, and were only awarded a #3 seed. It apparently was a down year for the Big Ten as only four teams made the NCAA tournament.

Wisconsin handled #14 seed Cal State Fullerton 71-56 in the first round. Then had to be on "upset alert" for #11 seed cinderella Kansas St, who boasted stud freshman Michael Beasley. However, Wisconsin prevailed 72-55. In the Sweet Sixteen they ran into the true cinderella, #10 seed Davidson with Steph Curry, and lost 56-73. Trevon Hughes was hobbled with a bum ankle and only played 11 minutes in that game.

This was the year all #1 seeds made the Final Four, and Kansas beat Memphis in the championship.

== Awards ==
All-Big Ten by Media

- Brian Butch - 1st team
- Michael Flowers - 2nd team
- Marcus Landry - 3rd team
- Trevon Hughes - Honorable mention

All-Big Ten by Coaches

- Brian Butch - 1st team
- Marcus Landry - 2nd team
- Michael Flowers - 3rd team & All-Defensive team
- Joe Krabbenhoft - All-Defensive team

== Roster ==
No.	Name	Position	Ht.	Wt.	Year	Hometown/High School
12	Jason Bohannon	G	6–2	195	SO	Marion, Iowa / Linn-Mar HS
14	Tanner Bronson	G	5–11	160	SR	Glendale, Wisconsin / Nicolet HS
32	Brian Butch	F	6–11	240	SR	Appleton, Wisconsin / West HS
21	Morris Cain	G	6–5	185	JR	Glendale, Wisconsin / Nicolet High School
22	Michael Flowers	G	6–2	185	SR	Madison, Wisconsin / La Follette High School
44	J.P. Gavinski	C	6–11	250	RS FR	Wisconsin Dells, Wisconsin / Wisconsin Dells HS
43	Kevin Gullikson	F	6–7	210	JR	Stillwater, Minnesota / Stillwater Sr. HS
3	Trevon Hughes	G	6–1	180	SO	Queens, New York / St. John's NW Academy
24	Tim Jarmusz	F/G	6–6	200	FR	Oshkosh, Wisconsin / West HS
45	Joe Krabbenhoft	F/G	6–6	217	JR	Sioux Falls, South Dakota / Roosevelt HS
1	Marcus Landry	F	6–7	215	JR	Milwaukee, Wisconsin / Vincent HS
30	Jon Leuer	F	6–10	208	FR	Orono, Minnesota / Orono HS
52	Keaton Nankivil	F	6–9	245	FR	Madison, Wisconsin / Memorial HS
2	Wquinton Smith	G	5–11	200	FR	Milwaukee, Wisconsin / Rufus King
34	Greg Stiemsma	C	6–11	245	SR	Randolph, Wisconsin / Randolph HS
15	Brett Valentyn	G	6–4	175	RS FR	Verona, Wisconsin / Verona HS

== Schedule ==
Date time, TV	Rank^{#}	Opponent^{#}	Result	Record	High points	High rebounds	High assists	Site (attendance) city, state
Regular Season
11/11/2007*; 6:00pm, BTN		IPFW	W 83–55	1–0	24 – Butch (1)	13 – Butch (1)	5 – Hughes (1)	Kohl Center (17,190); Madison, WI
11/15/2007*; 9:00pm, BTN		Savannah State; America's Youth Classic	W 79–32	2–0	21 – Hughes (1)	10 – Krabbenhoft (1), Butch (2)	4 – Steimsma (1), Krabbenhoft (1)	Kohl Center (17,190); Madison, WI
11/16/2007*; 8:00pm, BTN		vs. Florida A&M; America's Youth Classic	W 88–40	3–0	17 – Landry (1), Bohannon (1)	10 – Krabbenhoft (2)	5 – Flowers (1)	Kohl Center (17,190); Madison, WI
11/17/2007*; 8:00pm, BTN		Colorado; America's Youth Classic	W 78–52	4–0	18 – Hughes (2)	8 – Butch (3)	5 – Landry (1)	Kohl Center (17,190); Madison, WI
11/24/2007*; 6:30pm, BTN		Georgia	W 68–49	5–0	18 – Hughes (3)	13 – Butch (4)	5 – Krabbenhoft (2)	Kohl Center (17,190); Madison, WI
11/27/2007*; 9:00pm, ESPN	No. 20	at No. 7 Duke; ACC-Big Ten Challenge	L 82–58	5–1	12 – Leuer (1), Hughes (4)	6 – Landry (1)	3 – Flowers (2), Hughes (2)	Cameron Indoor Stadium (9,314); Durham, NC
12/3/2007*; 9:00pm, ESPN2	No. 23	Wofford	W 70–43	6–1	14 – Bohannon (2)	9 – Landry (2)	4 – Krabbenhoft (3), Flowers (3)	Kohl Center (17,190); Madison, WI
12/8/2007*; 6:00pm, ESPN360	No. 23	No. 15 Marquette	L 81–76	6–2	17 – Butch (2)	5 – Leuer (1), Krabbenhoft (3), Landry (3), Butch (5)	4 – Landry (2), Hughes (3)	Kohl Center (17,190); Madison, WI
12/12/2007*; 8:00pm		at Wisconsin–Milwaukee	W 61–39	7–2	16 – Landry (2)	7 – Butch (6)	3 – Hughes (4)	US Cellular Arena (10,017); Milwaukee, WI
12/15/2007*; 6:00pm		UW-Green Bay	W 70–52	8–2	12 – Krabbenhoft (1)	10 – Krabbenhoft (4)	5 – Krabbenhoft (4)	Kohl Center (17,190); Madison, WI
12/22/2007*; 8:30pm		Valparaiso	W 68–58	9–2	14 – Hughes (5)	11 – Krabbenhoft (5)	7 – Krabbenhoft (5)	Kohl Center (17,190); Madison, WI
12/29/2007*; 12:00pm		at No. 9 Texas	W 67–66	10–2	21 – Butch (3)	11 – Butch (7)	3 – Butch (1), Landry (3), Bohannon (1)	Frank Erwin Center (16,438); Austin, TX
1/2/2008; 7:00pm	No. 24	at Michigan	W 70–54	11–2 (1–0)	25 – Leuer (1)	6 – Landry (4)	4 – Krabbenhoft (6)	Crisler Arena (8,855); Ann Arbor, MI
1/5/2008; 12:00pm	No. 24	Iowa	W 64–51	12–2 (2–0)	22 – Butch (4)	7 – Krabbenhoft (6), Butch (8)	2 – Landry (4), Flowers (4), Hughes (5)	Kohl Center (17,190); Madison, WI
1/10/2008; 9:00pm	No. 21	Illinois	W 70–60	13–2 (3–0)	22 – Hughes (6)	7 – Butch (9)	5 – Hughes (6)	Kohl Center (17,190); Madison, WI
1/15/2008; 9:00pm	No. 17	at Penn State	W 80–55	14–2 (4–0)	23 – Flowers (1)	12 – Butch (10)	5 – Flowers (5)	Bryce Jordan Center (8,600); University Park, PA
1/19/2008; 9:00pm	No. 17	Northwestern	W 62–50	15–2 (5–0)	21 – Landry (3)	9 – Krabbenhoft (7)	2 – Bohannon (2), Flowers (6), Hughes (7)	Kohl Center (17,190); Madison, WI
1/22/2008; 7:00pm	No. 11	Michigan	W 64–61	16–2 (6–0)	14 – Flowers (2), Landry (4)	5 – Flowers (5), Krabbenhoft (8)	3 – Flowers (7), Hughes (8)	Kohl Center (17,190); Madison, WI
1/26/2008; 4:00pm	No. 11	at Purdue	L 60–56	16–3 (6–1)	20 – Butch (5)	13 – Butch (11)	3 – Flowers (8)	Mackey Arena (14,123); West Lafayette, IN
1/31/2008; 9:00pm	No. 13	No. 11 Indiana	W 62–49	17–3 (7–1)	16 – Hughes (7)	12 – Krabbenhoft (9)	5 – Krabbenhoft (7)	Kohl Center (17,190); Madison, WI
2/3/2008; 2:00pm	No. 13	at Minnesota	W 63–47	18–3 (8–1)	20 – Hughes (8)	8 – Flowers (2)	5 – Krabbenhoft (8)	Williams Arena (14,625); Minneapolis, MN
2/6/2008; 9:05pm	No. 8	at Iowa	W 60–54	19–3 (9–1)	16 – Landry (5)	8 – Krabbenhoft (10)	2 – Krabbenhoft (9)	Carver-Hawkeye Arena (12,342); Iowa City, IA
2/9/2008; 9:00pm	No. 8	Purdue	L 72–67	19–4 (9–2)	14 – Bohannon (3), Flowers (3)	9 – Landry (5), Krabbenhoft (11)	3 – Flowers (9), Hughes (9)	Kohl Center (17,190); Madison, WI
2/13/2008; 7:00pm	No. 14	at No. 12 Indiana	W 68–66	20–4 (10–2)	18 – Bohannon (4)	10 – Krabbenhoft (12)	3 – Steimsma (2), Flowers (10)	Assembly Hall (17,320); Bloomington, IN
2/16/2008; 2:00pm	No. 14	Minnesota	W 65–56	21–4 (11–2)	12 – Landry (6)	8 – Butch (12)	3 – Landry (5)	Kohl Center (17,190); Madison, WI
2/20/2008; 9:00pm	No. 10	at Illinois	W 71–57	22–4 (12–2)	18 – Hughes (9)	5 – Landry (6), Krabbenhoft (13), Butch (13)	3 – Landry (6), Flowers (11)	Assembly Hall (16,618); Champaign, IL
2/24/2008; 4:00pm, CBS	No. 10	at Ohio State	W 58–53	23–4 (13–2)	16 – Bohannon (5)	9 – Landry (7)	6 – Flowers (12)	Value City Arena (19,049); Columbus, OH
2/28/2008; 9:00pm	No. 9	No. 15 Michigan State	W 57–42	24–4 (14–2)	16 – Butch (6)	7 – Butch (14)	4 – Hughes (10)	Kohl Center (17,190); Madison, WI
3/5/2008; 9:00pm	No. 8	Penn State	W 77–41	25–4 (15–2)	15 – Landry (7)	8 – Flowers (3)	9 – Flowers (13)	Kohl Center (17,190); Madison, WI
3/8/2008; 3:00pm	No. 8	at Northwestern	W 65–52	26–4 (16–2)	20 – Butch (7)	14 – Butch (15)	4 – Krabbenhoft (10)	Welsh-Ryan Arena (8,117); Evanston, IL
Big Ten tournament
3/14/2008; 12:00pm	No. 6	vs. Michigan; Big Ten tournament – Quarterfinals	W 51–34	27–4	12 – Krabbenhoft (2)	7 – Stiemsma (1), Landry (8), Krabbenhoft (14)	2 – Flowers (14)	Conseco Fieldhouse (N/A); Indianapolis, IN
3/15/2008; 1:40pm, CBS	No. 6	vs. No. 19 Michigan State; Big Ten tournament – Semifinals	W 65–63	28–4	19 – Butch (8)	10 – Krabbenhoft (15)	3 – Flowers (15)	Conseco Fieldhouse (N/A); Indianapolis, IN
3/16/2008; 3:30pm, CBS	No. 6	vs. Illinois; Big Ten tournament – Finals	W 61–48	29–4	12 – Butch (9)	7 – Krabbenhoft (16)	4 – Landry (7)	Conseco Fieldhouse (14,579); Indianapolis, IN
NCAA tournament
3/20/2008*; 9:50pm, CBS	No. 3 (seed)	vs. No. 14 (seed) Cal St. Fullerton; First Round	W 71–56	30–4	14 – Butch (10)	12 – Landry (9)	4 – Hughes (11), Flowers (16)	Qwest Center Omaha (17,162); Omaha, NE
3/22/2008*; 4:20pm, CBS	No. 3 (seed)	vs. No. 11 (seed) Kansas State; Second Round	W 72–55	31–4	25 – Hughes (10)	7 – Stiemsma (2)	4 – Flowers (17)	Qwest Center Omaha (N/A); Omaha, NE
3/28/2008*; 3:30pm, CBS	No. 3 (seed)	vs. No. 10 (seed) Davidson; Sweet Sixteen	L 73–56	31–5	12 – Flowers (4)	6 – Flowers (4), Landry (10)	3 – Bohannon (3)	Ford Field (N/A); Detroit, MI
*Non-conference game. ^{#}Rankings from AP Poll. (#) Tournament seedings in parentheses.
