= 2007–08 Purdue Boilermakers men's basketball team =

American college basketball season

2007–08 Purdue Boilermakers men's basketball

NCAA Tournament, Round of 32
- Conference: Big Ten Conference

Ranking
- Coaches: No. 20
- AP: No. 20
- Record: 25–9 (15–3, Big Ten)
- Head coach: Matt Painter
- Assistant coaches: Cuonzo Martin; Paul Lusk; Rick Ray
- Home arena: Mackey Arena

2007–08 Big Ten Conference men's basketball standings
	Conf.				Overall
Team	W		L	PCT	W		L	PCT
No. 6 Wisconsin†	16	–	2	.889	31	–	5	.861
No. 20 Purdue	15	–	3	.833	25	–	9	.735
Indiana	14	–	4	.778	25	–	8	.758
No. 18 Michigan State	12	–	6	.667	27	–	9	.750
Ohio State	10	–	8	.556	24	–	13	.649
Minnesota	8	–	10	.444	20	–	14	.588
Penn State	7	–	11	.389	15	–	16	.484
Iowa	6	–	12	.333	13	–	19	.406
Illinois	5	–	13	.278	16	–	19	.457
Michigan	5	–	13	.278	10	–	22	.313
Northwestern	1	–	17	.056	8	–	22	.267
† 2008 Big Ten tournament winner As of March 23, 2008; Rankings from AP poll

The 2007–08 Purdue Boilermakers men's basketball team represented Purdue University. The head coach was Matt Painter, then in his 3rd season with the Boilers. The Boilers did well at home, going 9–0 in the Big Ten and losing only a single home game overall (16–1). Purdue finished second in the Big Ten with a 15–3 record. They lost to Illinois in the first round of the Big Ten tournament despite having a #2 seed. The Boilers accepted a bid to the NCAA Tournament where they made it to the second round before losing to Xavier, 85–78.

== Roster ==
No.	Name	Position	Ht.	Year	Hometown
1	Garrett Mocas	F	6–8	So.	Columbus, Indiana
2	Chad Sutor	F	6–7	Fr.	Bloomington, Indiana
3	Chris Kramer	G	6–3	So.	Huntington, Indiana
4	Robbie Hummel	G/F	6–8	Fr.	Valparaiso, Indiana
5	Keaton Grant	G	6–4	So.	Kissimmee, Florida
11	Bobby Riddell	G	5–9	Jr.	Lafayette, Indiana
12	Tarrance Crump	G	6–1	R-Sr.	Decatur, Alabama
14	Scott Martin	G/F	6–8	Fr.	Valparaiso, Indiana
20	Marcus Green	G	6–4	Jr.	Franklin Park, Illinois
21	Nemanja Calasan	F	6–9	Jr.	Srbinje, Bosnia & Herzegovina
25	JaJuan Johnson	F/C	6–10	Fr.	Indianapolis, Indiana
30	Mark Wohlford	G	6–0	So.	Columbus, Indiana
33	E'Twaun Moore	G	6–3	Fr.	East Chicago, Indiana
55	Chris Reid	F	6–9	Jr.	Castro Valley, California

== Results ==
Date time, TV	Rank^{#}	Opponent^{#}	Result	Record	Site (attendance) city, state
November 15*; 7:00 PM		Bethune-Cookman	W 66–40	1–0	Mackey Arena (12,848); West Lafayette, IN
November 20*; 9:00 PM		Lipscomb	W 66–62	2–0	Mackey Arena (12,907); West Lafayette, IN
November 24*; 2:00 PM		Loyola Chicago	W 84–53	3–0	Mackey Arena (8,115); West Lafayette, IN
November 27*; 9:30 PM		at No. 18 Clemson; ACC–Big Ten Challenge	L 58–61	3–1	Littlejohn Coliseum (7,350); Clemson, SC
December 1*; 3:00 PM		Indiana State	W 71–60	4–1	Mackey Arena (14,077); West Lafayette, IN
December 5*; 7:00 PM		Ball State	W 70–57	5–1	Mackey Arena (13,212); West Lafayette, IN
December 8*; 4:00 PM		at Missouri	L 63–73	5–2	Mizzou Arena (7,699); Columbia, MO
December 15*; 3:30 PM		vs. No. 22 Lousiville; Wooden Tradition	W 67–59	6–2	Conseco Fieldhouse (7,699); Indianapolis, IN
December 17*; 7:00 PM		Texas Southern; Las Vegas Classic on-campus game	W 76–56	7–2	Mackey Arena (7,303); West Lafayette, IN
December 19*; 7:00 PM		Wofford; Las Vegas Classic on-campus game	L 66–69	7–3	Mackey Arena (7,481); West Lafayette, IN
December 22*; 10:30 PM		vs. Iowa State; Las Vegas Classic semifinals	L 80–83	7–4	Orleans Arena; Las Vegas, NV
December 23*		vs. Missouri State; Las Vegas Classic consolation game	W 72–70	8–4	Orleans Arena; Las Vegas, NV
December 29*; 12:00 PM		FIU	W 59–44	9–4	Mackey Arena (8,828); West Lafayette, IN
January 5; 2:00 PM		Michigan	W 65–58	10–4 (1–0)	Mackey Arena (14,010); West Lafayette, IN
January 8; 9:00 PM		at No. 6 Michigan State	L 75–78	10–5 (1–1)	Breslin Center (14,759); East Lansing, MI
January 12; 4:00 PM		Ohio State	W 75–68	11–5 (2–1)	Mackey Arena (14,123); West Lafayette, IN
January 16; 7:00 PM		at Iowa	W 67–62	12–5 (3–1)	Carver-Hawkeye Arena (9,701); Iowa City, IA
January 19; 2:00 PM		Illinois	W 74–67	13–5 (4–1)	Mackey Arena (14,123); West Lafayette, IN
January 23; 7:00 PM		at Penn State	W 64–42	14–5 (5–1)	Bryce Jordan Center (6,287); University Park, PA
January 26; 4:00 PM		No. 11 Wisconsin	W 60–56	15–5 (6–1)	Mackey Arena (14,123); West Lafayette, IN
January 30; 7:00 PM		Iowa	W 51–50	16–5 (7–1)	Mackey Arena (13,370); West Lafayette, IN
February 2; 3:30 PM		at Illinois	W 83–75	17–5 (8–1)	Assembly Hall (16,618); Champaign, IL
February 5; 9:00 PM	No. 24	Penn State	W 67–53	18–5 (9–1)	Mackey Arena (13,289); West Lafayette, IN
February 9; 9:00 PM	No. 24	at No. 8 Wisconsin	W 72–67	19–5 (10–1)	Kohl Center (17,190); Madison, WI
February 12; 7:00 PM	No. 19	No. 10 Michigan State	W 60–54	20–5 (11–1)	Mackey Arena (14,123); West Lafayette, IN
February 16; 4:00 PM	No. 19	at Northwestern	W 71–56	21–5 (12–1)	Welsh-Ryan Arena (8,117); Evanston, IL
February 19; 7:00 PM	No. 14	at No. 15 Indiana; Rivalry/Crimson and Gold Cup	L 68–77	21–6 (12–2)	Assembly Hall; Bloomington, IN
February 27; 9:00 PM	No. 16	Minnesota	W 65–53	22–6 (13–2)	Mackey Arena (13,815); West Lafayette, IN
March 1; 2:00 PM	No. 16	Northwestern	W 68–43	23–6 (14–2)	Mackey Arena (14,123); West Lafayette, IN
March 4; 7:00 PM	No. 15	at Ohio State	L 77–80 ^{OT}	23–7 (14–3)	Value City Arena (19,049); Columbus, OH
March 9; 4:00 PM	No. 15	at Michigan	W 72–58	24–7 (15–3)	Crisler Arena (12,047); Ann Arbor, MI
Big Ten tournament
March 14; 6:40 PM	(2) No. 17	vs. (10) Illinois; Quarterfinals	L 67–74	24–8	Conseco Fieldhouse (18,691); Indianapolis, IN
NCAA tournament
March 20*; 2:50 PM	(6 W) No. 17	vs. (11 W) Baylor; First round	W 90–79	25–8	Verizon Center (18,400); Washington, D.C.
March 22*; 4:40 PM	(6 W) No. 17	vs. (3 W) Xavier; Second round	L 78–85	25–9	Verizon Center (18,400); Washington, D.C.
*Non-conference game. ^{#}Rankings from AP Poll. (#) Tournament seedings in parentheses. W=West region. All times are in Eastern Time.

== See also ==
- 2008 NCAA Division I men's basketball tournament
- 2007-08 NCAA Division I men's basketball season
- 2007-08 NCAA Division I men's basketball rankings
- 2007–08 Big Ten Conference men's basketball season

== Notes ==
- The 25 wins were the most for Purdue since Gene Keady's 1997-98 team, when Purdue went 28–8.
