= 2007–08 Indiana Hoosiers men's basketball team =

American college basketball season

2007–08 Indiana Hoosiers men's basketball

NCAA men's Division I tournament, Round of 64
- Conference: Big Ten Conference
- Record: 25–8 (14–4 Big Ten)
- Head coach: Kelvin Sampson (2nd season; first 26 games); Dan Dakich (remaining 7 games)
- Assistant coaches: Ray McCallum; Jeff Meyer; Rob Senderoff
- Home arena: Assembly Hall

2007–08 Big Ten Conference men's basketball standings
	Conf.				Overall
Team	W		L	PCT	W		L	PCT
No. 6 Wisconsin†	16	–	2	.889	31	–	5	.861
No. 20 Purdue	15	–	3	.833	25	–	9	.735
Indiana	14	–	4	.778	25	–	8	.758
No. 18 Michigan State	12	–	6	.667	27	–	9	.750
Ohio State	10	–	8	.556	24	–	13	.649
Minnesota	8	–	10	.444	20	–	14	.588
Penn State	7	–	11	.389	15	–	16	.484
Iowa	6	–	12	.333	13	–	19	.406
Illinois	5	–	13	.278	16	–	19	.457
Michigan	5	–	13	.278	10	–	22	.313
Northwestern	1	–	17	.056	8	–	22	.267
† 2008 Big Ten tournament winner As of March 23, 2008; Rankings from AP poll

The 2007–08 Indiana Hoosiers men's basketball team represented Indiana University during the 2007-08 NCAA Division I men's basketball season. Indiana was a member of the Big Ten Conference. They played their home games in Assembly Hall in Bloomington, Indiana. The interim head coach at the end of the season was Dan Dakich. Indiana University announced on February 22, 2008, that Kelvin Sampson had accepted a $750,000 buyout of his contract and resigned as the Indiana University men's basketball coach.

On March 10, 2008, D. J. White and Eric Gordon were named to the First Team All-Big Ten and Armon Bassett was named to the third team. White was also named the Conference Player of the Year. In the off season, starters Armon Bassett and Jamarcus Ellis were dismissed from the team after they failed to show up for a player meeting with coach Dakich, then failed to show up for a 6 a.m. run the following day. In December 2008, Eric Gordon stated that the 2007–08 season was ruined by turmoil due to drug use by some players on the team.

== Roster ==
Name	Number	Position	Height	Weight	Year	Hometown
Adam Ahlfeld	34	G	6–0	193	Senior	Indianapolis, Indiana
Armon Bassett	1	G	6–1	176	Sophomore	Terre Haute, Indiana
Jordan Crawford	5	G	6–4	195	Freshman	Detroit, Michigan
Jamarcus Ellis	13	G	6–5	200	Junior	Chicago, Illinois
Brett Finkelmeier	4	G	6–2	180	Freshman	Carmel, Indiana
Eric Gordon	23	G	6–4	215	Freshman	Indianapolis, Indiana
Eli Holman	32	C	6–9	210	Freshman	Richmond, California
Brandon McGee	24	F	6–7	220	Freshman	Chicago, Illinois
Lance Stemler	22	F	6–8	210	Senior	Columbia, Illinois
Kyle Taber	44	F	6–7	226	Junior	Evansville, Indiana
DeAndre Thomas	2	F	6–8	295	Junior	Chicago, Illinois
D. J. White	3	F	6–9	251	Senior	Tuscaloosa, Alabama
Mike White	30	F	6–6	232	Senior	Springhill, Louisiana

Coaches: Kelvin Sampson, Jeff Meyer, Dan Dakich, Ray McCallum

== Recruiting class ==
College recruiting
Name	Hometown	School	Height	Weight	Commit date
Jordan Crawford; SG	Detroit, MI	Hargrave Military Academy (VA)	6 ft 4 in (1.93 m)	180 lb (82 kg)	Nov 15, 2006
Jordan Crawford; SG	Recruit ratings: Scout: Rivals: (81)				
Jamarcus Ellis; SG	Chicago, IL	Chipola J.C. (FL)	6 ft 5 in (1.96 m)	185 lb (84 kg)	Aug 14, 2006
Jamarcus Ellis; SG	Recruit ratings: Scout: Rivals:				
Eric Gordon; SG	Indianapolis, IN	North Central	6 ft 4 in (1.93 m)	215 lb (98 kg)	Oct 13, 2006
Eric Gordon; SG	Recruit ratings: Scout: Rivals: (98)				
Eli Holman; C	Richmond, CA	Richmond	6 ft 10 in (2.08 m)	220 lb (100 kg)	Sep 2, 2006
Eli Holman; C	Recruit ratings: Scout: Rivals: (93)				
Brandon McGee; PF	Chicago, IL	Crane	6 ft 7 in (2.01 m)	220 lb (100 kg)	Aug 8, 2006
Brandon McGee; PF	Recruit ratings: Scout: Rivals: (93)				
DeAndre Thomas; PF	Chicago, IL	Chipola J.C. (FL)	6 ft 8 in (2.03 m)	303 lb (137 kg)	Apr 9, 2007
DeAndre Thomas; PF	Recruit ratings: Rivals:				
Overall recruit ranking: Scout: 10 Rivals: 9
Note: In many cases, Scout, Rivals, 247Sports, On3, and ESPN may conflict in their listings of height and weight.; In these cases, the average was taken. ESPN grades are on a 100-point scale.; Sources: "2007 Team Ranking". Rivals.

== Schedule and results ==
Date time, TV	Rank^{#}	Opponent^{#}	Result	Record	Site city, state
11/12/07*; 7:00, BTN	No. 8	Chattanooga	W 99–77	1–0	Assembly Hall; Bloomington, IN
11/18/07*; BTN	No. 8	Longwood; Chicago Invitational Challenge	W 100–49	2–0	Assembly Hall; Bloomington, IN
11/20/07*; BTN	No. 8	N.C. Wilmington; Chicago Invitational Challenge	W 95–71	3–0	Assembly Hall; Bloomington, IN
11/23/07*; 8:30, BTN	No. 8	vs. Illinois State; Chicago Invitational Challenge	W 70–57	4–0	Sears Centre; Hoffman Estates, IL
11/24/07*; 8:30, BTN	No. 8	vs. Xavier; Chicago Invitational Challenge	L 65–80	4–1	Sears Centre; Hoffman Estates, IL
11/27/07*; 7:00, ESPN	No. 15	Georgia Tech; ACC–Big Ten Challenge	W 83–79	5–1	Assembly Hall; Bloomington, IN
12/1/07*; 9:30, ESPNU	No. 15	at No. 22 Southern Illinois	W 64–51	6–1	SIU Arena; Carbondale, IL
12/3/07*; 7:00, BTN	No. 15	Tennessee State	W 84–72	7–1	Assembly Hall; Bloomington, IN
12/8/07*; 4:00, CBS	No. 15	Kentucky	W 70–51	8–1	Assembly Hall; Bloomington, IN
12/15/07*; 8:00, BTN	No. 14	Western Carolina	W 100–52	9–1	Assembly Hall; Bloomington, IN
12/22/07*; 12:00, BTN	No. 14	Coppin State	W 73–46	10–1	Assembly Hall; Bloomington, IN
12/29/07*; 7:00, BTN	No. 14	Chicago State	W 97–59	11–1	Assembly Hall; Bloomington, IN
1/2/08; 9:00, BTN	No. 12	at Iowa	W 79–76	12–1 (1–0)	Carver-Hawkeye Arena; Iowa City, IA
1/8/08; 7:00, ESPN	No. 11	at Michigan	W 78–64	13–1 (2–0)	Crisler Arena; Ann Arbor, MI
1/13/08; 4:30, CBS	No. 11	Illinois; Rivalry	W 62–58	14–1 (3–0)	Assembly Hall; Bloomington, IN
1/17/08; 9:00, ESPN	No. 10	at Minnesota	W 65–60	15–1 (4–0)	Williams Arena; Minneapolis, MN
1/20/08; 2:00, BTN	No. 10	Penn State	W 81–65	16–1 (5–0)	Assembly Hall; Bloomington, IN
1/23/08; 9:00, BTN	No. 8	Iowa	W 65–43	17–1 (6–0)	Assembly Hall; Bloomington, IN
1/26/08*; 1:00, CBS	No. 8	Connecticut	L 63–68	17–2 (6–0)	Assembly Hall; Bloomington, IN
1/31/08; 9:00, ESPN	No. 11	at No. 13 Wisconsin	L 49–62	17–3 (6–1)	Kohl Center; Madison, WI
2/3/08; 12:00, BTN	No. 11	Northwestern	W 75–63	18–3 (7–1)	Assembly Hall; Bloomington, IN
2/7/08; 9:00, ESPN	No. 13	at Illinois; Rivalry	W 83–79 ^{2OT}	19–3 (8–1)	Assembly Hall; Champaign, IL
2/10/08; 1:00, CBS	No. 13	at Ohio State	W 59–53	20–3 (9–1)	Schottenstein Center; Columbus, OH
2/13/08; 7:00, BTN	No. 12	No. 14 Wisconsin	L 66–68	20–4 (9–2)	Assembly Hall; Bloomington, IN
2/16/08; 9:00, ESPN	No. 12	No. 9 Michigan State	W 80–61	21–4 (10–2)	Assembly Hall; Bloomington, IN
2/19/08; 7:00, ESPN	No. 14	No. 15 Purdue; Rivalry/Crimson and Gold Cup	W 77–68	22–4 (11–2)	Assembly Hall; Bloomington, IN
2/23/08; 8:00, BTN	No. 14	at Northwestern	W 85–82	23–4 (12–2)	Welsh-Ryan Arena; Evanston, IL
2/26/08; 7:00, ESPN	No. 12	Ohio State	W 72–69	24–4 (13–2)	Assembly Hall; Bloomington, IN
3/2/08; 2:00, CBS	No. 12	at No. 15 Michigan State	L 74–103	24–5 (13–3)	Breslin Center; East Lansing, MI
3/5/08; 7:00, BTN	No. 17	Minnesota; Senior Night	W 69–55	25–5 (14–3)	Assembly Hall; Bloomington, IN
3/9/08; 2:00, ESPN	No. 17	at Penn State	L 64–68	25–6 (14–4)	Bryce Jordan Center; University Park, PA
Big Ten tournament
3/14/08; 9:00, BTN	No. 20	vs. Minnesota; Big Ten Quarterfinals	L 58–59	25–7	Conseco Fieldhouse; Indianapolis, IN
NCAA tournament
3/21/08*; 9:40, CBS	No. 24(8E)	vs. Arkansas(9E); NCAA Tournament First Round	L 72–86	25–8	RBC Center; Raleigh, NC
*Non-conference game. ^{#}Rankings from Coaches' Poll. (#) Tournament seedings in parentheses.

== See also ==
- Indiana Hoosiers men's basketball
- 2007–08 Big Ten Conference men's basketball season
- 2008 Big Ten Conference men's basketball tournament
- 2008 NCAA Division I men's basketball tournament
