= 2010–11 Michigan Wolverines men's basketball team =

American college basketball season

2010–11 Michigan Wolverines men's basketball
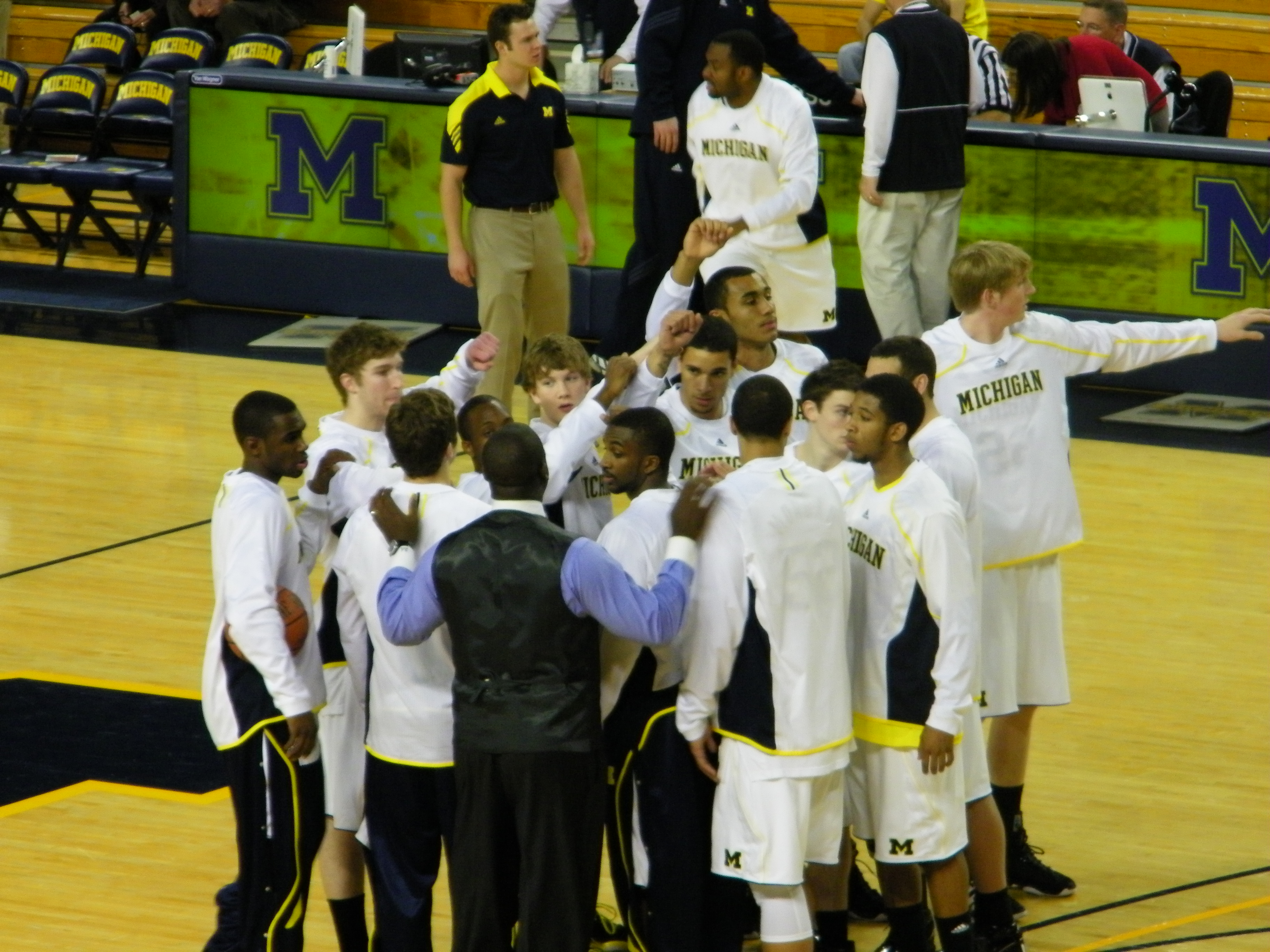

NCAA tournament, Round of 32
- Conference: Big Ten Conference
- Record: 21–14 (9–9 Big Ten)
- Head coach: John Beilein (4th season)
- Assistant coaches: Jeff Meyer; LaVall Jordan; Bacari Alexander
- MVP: Darius Morris
- Captains: Zack Novak; Stu Douglass
- Home arena: Crisler Arena

2010–11 Big Ten Conference men's basketball standings
	Conf.				Overall
Team	W		L	PCT	W		L	PCT
No. 1 Ohio State †	16	–	2	.889	34	–	3	.919
No. 13 Purdue	14	–	4	.778	26	–	8	.765
No. 16 Wisconsin	13	–	5	.722	25	–	9	.735
Michigan	9	–	9	.500	21	–	14	.600
Illinois	9	–	9	.500	20	–	14	.588
Penn State	9	–	9	.500	19	–	15	.559
Michigan State	9	–	9	.500	19	–	15	.559
Northwestern	7	–	11	.389	20	–	14	.588
Minnesota	6	–	12	.333	17	–	14	.548
Iowa	4	–	14	.222	11	–	20	.355
Indiana	3	–	15	.167	12	–	20	.375
† 2011 Big Ten tournament winner Rankings from AP poll

The 2010–11 Michigan Wolverines men's basketball team represented the University of Michigan during the 2010–11 NCAA Division I men's basketball season. The team was coached by John Beilein. The team played its home games in Ann Arbor, Michigan at the Crisler Arena, which has a capacity of 13,751, for the forty-fourth consecutive year. This season marked the team's ninety-fourth consecutive year as a member of the Big Ten Conference. The team witnessed the departure of its four tallest players and two leading scorers from the prior season. The incoming class featured the sons of two former National Basketball Association players (Tim Hardaway and Tito Horford) and the younger brother of a current one (Al Horford). Additionally Joe Dumars' son Jordan transferred to the team and Glenn Robinson's son, Glenn Robinson III verbally committed to the class of 2012. The season was marked by close losses against numerous highly ranked teams.

Although the team began with a 1–6 record in conference play, they rebounded to finish with a 9–9 conference mark. This put them in a four-way tie for fourth and earned them a number four seed in the 2011 Big Ten Conference men's basketball tournament. For the fifth consecutive year they won their first game in the tournament, but lost in the semifinals to eventual champion Ohio State. They also earned a number eight seed in the 2011 NCAA Division I men's basketball tournament, where they logged a record-setting performance in the first game, but lost in their second game (in the round of 32).

The team was captained by Zack Novak, who became one of the forty Academic All-American finalists for the second year in a row, and Stu Douglass. The team was also led by Darius Morris and Tim Hardaway Jr. who earned third team and honorable mention All-Big Ten recognition, respectively. Hardaway was one of two unanimous Big Ten All-Freshman selections. Hardaway set the school freshman single-season record for three-point shots made and Morris set the school single-season record for assists. Hardaway was selected to the 2011 Collegeinsider.com Freshmen All-America team.

On NCAA Tournament selection Sunday, The Fab Five aired and comments it contained brought attention to issues of race in sports and education and the Duke–Michigan rivalry. Past Duke and Michigan players traded barbs in leading national newspapers. The teams met in the 2011 NCAA tournament the following week with Duke prevailing.

== 2010–11 incoming team members ==
The 2010–11 Wolverines saw assistant coach John Mahoney be replaced by Bacari Alexander. Alexander had most recently been an assistant for Western Michigan. Jerry Dunn, who took a leave of absence in December of the prior season, was replaced by Jeff Meyer who had filled in for him on an interim basis. Mike Jackson left the Michigan basketball program to join rival Purdue and was replaced by LaVall Jordan, who previously served as an assistant coach for Iowa.

The team lost its four tallest contributors from the prior season: DeShawn Sims, Zack Gibson, Anthony Wright and Manny Harris. The same weekend that Harris declared for the 2010 NBA draft in late March, the team accepted a commitment from Jon Horford. Horford, who was named a 2010 Class A All-State performer from the Associated Press, the Detroit Free Press and the Detroit News, is the younger brother of Atlanta Hawk Al Horford and son of former NBA player Tito Horford. Horford did not actually sign his letter of intent until the opening of the spring signing period on April 14. After Horford's signing, the Wolverines had two scholarships available. The 2010 class included Tim Hardaway Jr., son of Tim Hardaway. With the signings and loss of Ben Cronin to injury, the 2010–11 team's front court was composed of incoming freshmen Evan Smotrycz and Horford along with redshirt freshmen Blake McLimans and Jordan Morgan.

Jordan Dumars (son of Joe Dumars) transferred to the University of Michigan in January 2010 after playing in six games for the South Florida Bulls men's basketball team. According to NCAA transfer eligibility rules, he must sit out a complete academic year. Thus, he was able to join the team following the completion of the fall 2010 semester.

College recruiting information
Name	Hometown	School	Height	Weight	Commit date
Tim Hardaway Jr. SG	Miami, Florida	Miami Palmetto High School (Florida)	6 ft 5 in (1.96 m)	185 lb (84 kg)	Jun 29, 2009
Tim Hardaway Jr. SG	Recruit ratings: Scout: Rivals: (93)				
Evan Smotrycz; SF	Reading, Massachusetts	New Hampton School (New Hampshire)	6 ft 9 in (2.06 m)	225 lb (102 kg)	Sep 4, 2009
Evan Smotrycz; SF	Recruit ratings: Scout: Rivals: (94)				
Colton Christian; SF	Bellevue, Washington	Hargrave Military Academy (Virginia)	6 ft 7 in (2.01 m)	215 lb (98 kg)	Nov 5, 2010
Colton Christian; SF	Recruit ratings: Scout: Rivals: (85)				
Jon Horford; PF	Grand Ledge, Michigan	Grand Ledge High School (Michigan)	6 ft 9 in (2.06 m)	220 lb (100 kg)	Mar 26, 2010
Jon Horford; PF	Recruit ratings: Scout: Rivals: (88)				
Overall recruit ranking: ESPN: 14
Note: In many cases, Scout, Rivals, 247Sports, On3, and ESPN may conflict in their listings of height and weight.; In these cases, the average was taken. ESPN grades are on a 100-point scale.; Sources: "Michigan 2010 Basketball Commitments". Rivals.; "2010 Michigan Basketball Commits". Scout.; "ESPN". ESPN.; "Scout.com Team Recruiting Rankings". Scout.; "2010 Team Ranking". Rivals.

College recruiting information
Name	Hometown	School	Height	Weight	Commit date
Jordan Dumars; SF/SG	Birmingham, Michigan	Detroit Country Day School (Michigan)	6 ft 4 in (1.93 m)	230 lb (100 kg)	
Jordan Dumars; SF/SG	Recruit ratings: Scout: Rivals: (80)				
Overall recruit ranking: ESPN: 127
Note: In many cases, Scout, Rivals, 247Sports, On3, and ESPN may conflict in their listings of height and weight.; In these cases, the average was taken. ESPN grades are on a 100-point scale.; Sources: "2009 South Florida Basketball Commitment List". Rivals.; "2010 South Florida College Basketball Recruiting Commits". Scout.; "ESPN". ESPN.; "Scout.com Team Recruiting Rankings". Scout.; "2010 Team Ranking". Rivals.

=== 2011–12 team recruits ===
College recruiting information
Name	Hometown	School	Height	Weight	Commit date
Trey Burke; PG	Columbus, Ohio	Northland High School (Ohio)	6 ft 1 in (1.85 m)	170 lb (77 kg)	Aug 24, 2010
Trey Burke; PG	Recruit ratings: Scout: Rivals: (93)				
Carlton Brundidge; SG/PG	Southfield, Michigan	Southfield High School (Michigan)	6 ft 1 in (1.85 m)	200 lb (91 kg)	Sep 21, 2009
Carlton Brundidge; SG/PG	Recruit ratings: Scout: Rivals: (94)				
Max Bielfeldt; PF	Peoria, Illinois	Notre Dame High School (Illinois)	6 ft 8 in (2.03 m)	240 lb (110 kg)	Mar 25, 2011
Max Bielfeldt; PF	Recruit ratings: Scout: Rivals: (87)				
Overall recruit ranking:
Note: In many cases, Scout, Rivals, 247Sports, On3, and ESPN may conflict in their listings of height and weight.; In these cases, the average was taken. ESPN grades are on a 100-point scale.; Sources: "Michigan 2011 Basketball Commitments". Rivals.; "2011 Michigan Basketball Commits". Scout.; "ESPN". ESPN.; "Scout.com Team Recruiting Rankings". Scout.; "2011 Team Ranking". Rivals.

The team also announced that Glenn Robinson III, son of Glenn Robinson verbally committed on September 14, 2010, as the first commitment in Michigan's class of 2012. On March 26, 2011, Michigan received its second verbal commitment of the class of 2012 from Canadian wing guard Nik Stauskas.

== Roster ==
2010–11 Michigan Wolverines men's basketball team
Players
Coaches

Pos.	#	Name	Height	Weight	Year	Hometown
G	0	Zack Novak (C)	6 ft 5 in (1.96 m)	210 lb (95 kg)	Jr	Chesterton, Indiana
G	1	Stu Douglass (C)	6 ft 3 in (1.91 m)	185 lb (84 kg)	Jr	Carmel, Indiana
G	2	Jordan Dumars	6 ft 5 in (1.96 m)	225 lb (102 kg)	So	Detroit, Michigan
G	4	Darius Morris	6 ft 4 in (1.93 m)	180 lb (82 kg)	So	Los Angeles, California
G	5	Eso Akunne	6 ft 3 in (1.91 m)	220 lb (100 kg)	So	Ann Arbor, Michigan
G	10	Tim Hardaway Jr.	6 ft 5 in (1.96 m)	185 lb (84 kg)	Fr	Miami, Florida
G	13	Matt Vogrich	6 ft 4 in (1.93 m)	180 lb (82 kg)	So	Lake Forest, Illinois
F	15	Jon Horford	6 ft 9 in (2.06 m)	215 lb (98 kg)	Fr	Grand Ledge, Michigan
G	20	Josh Bartelstein	6 ft 3 in (1.91 m)	190 lb (86 kg)	So	Highland Park, Illinois
F	22	Blake McLimans	6 ft 10 in (2.08 m)	240 lb (109 kg)	RS Fr	Hamburg, New York
F	23	Evan Smotrycz	6 ft 9 in (2.06 m)	225 lb (102 kg)	Fr	Reading, Massachusetts
G	32	Corey Person	6 ft 4 in (1.93 m)	200 lb (91 kg)	RS So	Kalamazoo, Michigan
F	45	Colton Christian	6 ft 7 in (2.01 m)	215 lb (98 kg)	Fr	Bellevue, Washington
C	52	Jordan Morgan	6 ft 8 in (2.03 m)	240 lb (109 kg)	RS Fr	Detroit, Michigan

Head coach

- John Beilein (Wheeling)

Assistant coach(es)

- Jeff Meyer (Taylor)
- LaVall Jordan (Butler)
- Bacari Alexander (Detroit Mercy)

Legend

- (C) Team captain
- (S) Suspended
- (I) Ineligible
- (W) Walk-on
- Injured
- Current redshirt

Roster

== Offseason ==
In June 2010, Beilein announced that he had dismissed redshirt Junior Laval Lucas-Perry from the team. In August the team took part in a four-game exhibition tour in Belgium.

== Accolades ==
=== Honors and awards ===
- Darius Morris

Big Ten Player of the Week (12-27-10, 1-31-11)
Big Ten Assists average leader
All-Big Ten (3rd team)
National Association of Basketball Coaches All-District (2nd team)
Academic All-Conference
Team MVP

- Tim Hardaway Jr.

Big Ten Freshman of the Week (12-27-10, 2-14-11, 2-21-11, 2-28-11)
Big Ten All-Freshman (unanimous)
All-Big Ten (honorable mention)
Collegeinsider.com Freshmen All-America
Team USA FIBA U19

- Zack Novak

Academic All-District
Academic All-Conference

- Jordan Morgan

Big Ten Field goal percentage leader

- Josh Bartelstein

Academic All-Conference

- Matt Vogrich,

Academic All-Conference

=== Records ===
- Team

Michigan single-game three-point field goals made

- Darius Morris

Michigan single-season assists

- Tim Hardaway Jr.

Michigan Freshman single-season three-point field goals made

N.B. All accolades cited in the text below.

== Regular season ==
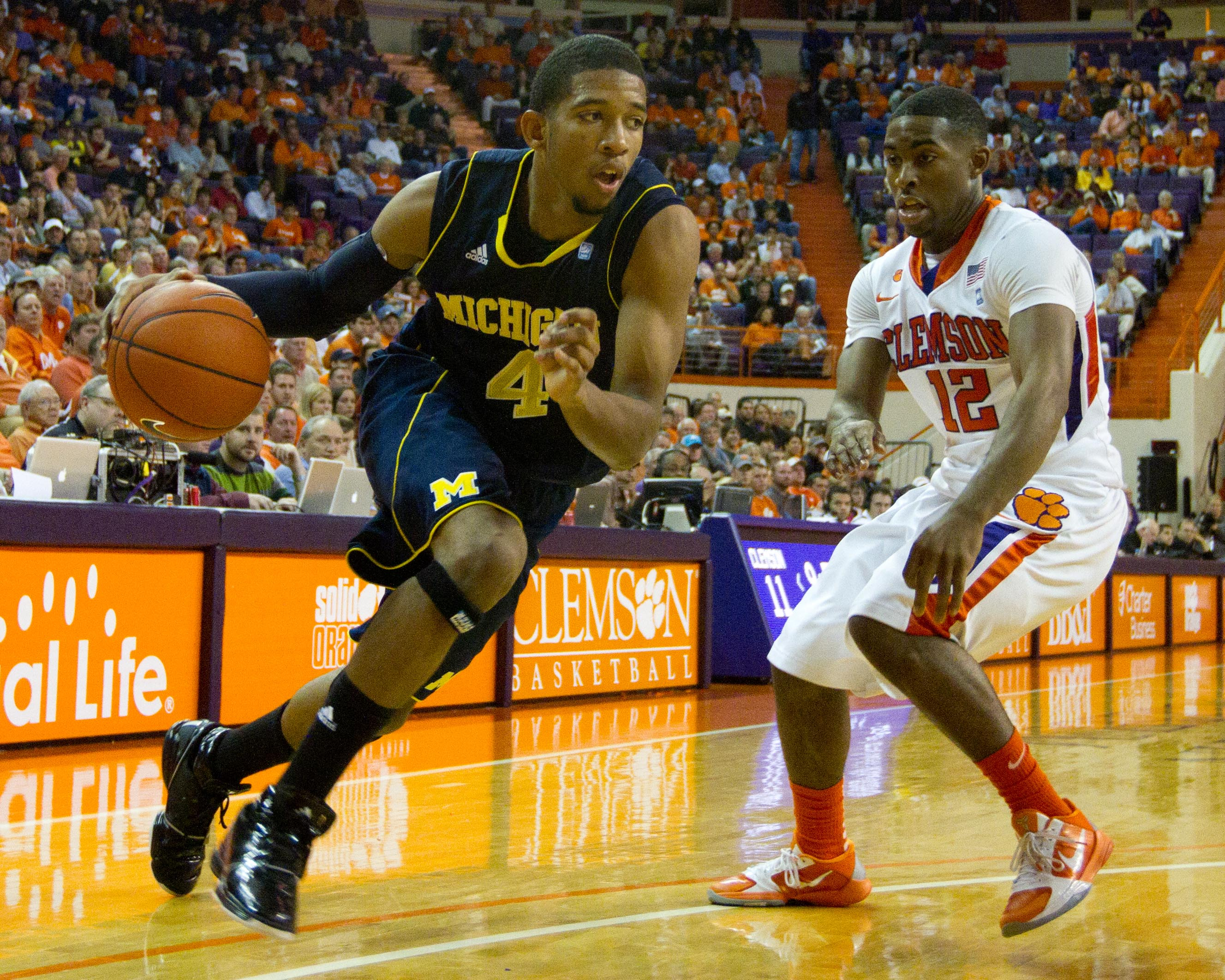
Darius Morris set the Michigan single-season assists record on his way to a third team 2010–11 All-Big Ten Conference selection

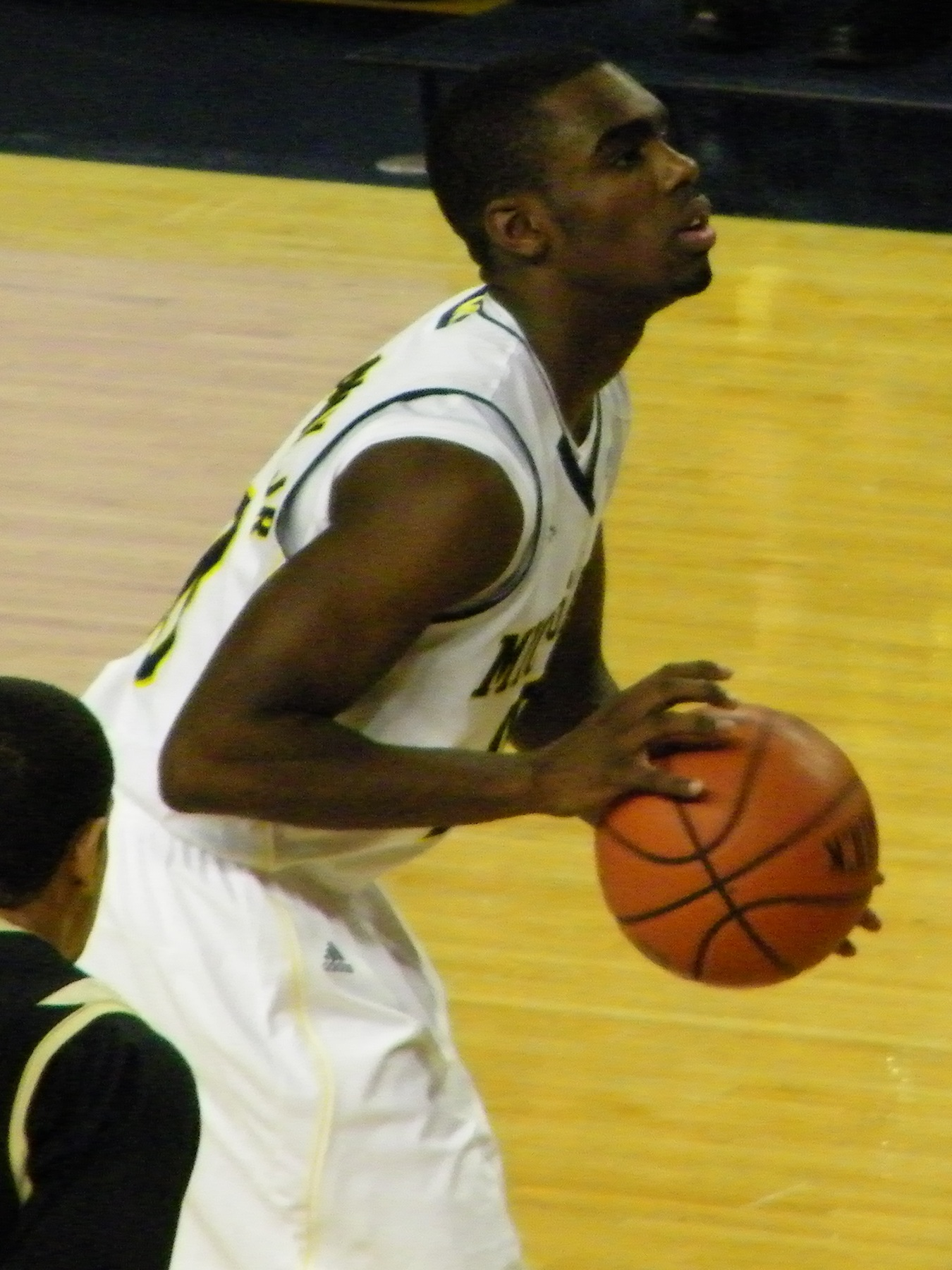
Tim Hardaway Jr. set the Michigan freshman single-season three-point shots made record on his way to a unanimous 2010–11Big Ten Conference All-Freshman selection

The seniorless 2010–11 team had one win against ranked opponents in eight regular season attempts. All but one loss against a ranked opponent was by single digits. In its first game against a top 10 team, it has lost to #10 Syracuse by 3 on November 26. The team had two wins over power conference opponents: Clemson and Utah. Those two wins were part of a November and December seven-game winning streak that was the team's first since the 2006–07 team opened its season with seven wins. The win against Clemson on November 30 was Michigan's first ACC-Big Ten Challenge win in five years. Another one of the seven wins was on December 4 against eventual 2010–11 Ivy League men's basketball season champion Harvard who was coached by former Michigan coach Tommy Amaker.

On December 23, 2010, against Bryant University, the team tied its December 13, 2008 single-game school record of 16 three-point field goals made. In the game, Darius Morris and Tim Hardaway Jr. had been two of three Wolverines to make four three-point shots. Morris had had 12 assists on his way to a double-double. It was Hardaway's first 20-point game. On December 27, the Big Ten Conference named Morris player of the week and Hardaway co-freshman of the week.

In its second and third games against top 10 teams, Michigan lost to #3 Kansas in overtime on January 9, and to #2 Ohio State by 4 on January 12. By week 11's poll, which was released on January 17, the team's first three top 10 opponents were the top three ranked teams in the country in both national polls and accounted for all the first place votes in the ESPN/USA Today Coaches' Poll.

On January 27, Morris led Michigan to its first win against Michigan State in East Lansing, Michigan at the Breslin Center since 1997. This was its only victory was against a ranked opponent as Michigan State was ranked 25 in one poll and unranked in the other on January 27. On January 30 against Iowa, he had become the third Michigan Wolverines men's basketball player (following Gary Grant and Manny Harris) to record a triple double. Morris repeated as player of the week on January 31, sharing the award with Talor Battle.

In its other close contests against ranked opponents, Michigan had a second single-digit loss to #1 Ohio State on February 3 in a game where they led at the half. They also had a one-point loss against #12 Wisconsin on February 23. On February 3, 2011, Novak was named one of 40 Academic All-District players by CoSIDA, making him a finalist to become one of fifteen Academic All-Americans on February 22. In February, Hardaway earned Big Ten Freshman of the Week honors three weeks in a row. On February 14, Hardaway earned his second Freshman of the week recognition for his first career double double on February 9 against Northwestern (17 points and career-high 10 rebounds) and a career-high 26 points on February 12 against Indiana. The following week, Hardaway earned a third Freshman of the week award as he became the first Michigan freshman to score thirty points in a game in eight years. His thirty points came in a 75–72 February 19 overtime victory over Iowa. He had also scored 10 points and added 5 assists in a 54–52 loss to Illinois. On February 28, Hardaway earned his third consecutive and fourth overall Big Ten Conference Freshman of the week recognition. During the week, Hardaway extended his double-digit scoring streak to eleven by posting 22 points against Minnesota on February 26 after scoring 16 against #12 Wisconsin on February 23. For the week, he shot 9 for 15 on his three-point shots.

After starting the conference schedule with a 1–6 record, the team won 8 of its last 11 games including a pair of games against in-state rival Michigan State to earn its first season sweep against them in 14 years and to finish tied for fourth in the conference with a 9–9 record. Following the 2010–11 Big Ten Conference men's basketball season, Darius Morris was selected as a third team All-Big Ten selection by both the coaches and the media and Hardaway was an honorable mention All-Big Ten selection by both. Hardaway was also one of two unanimous Big Ten All-Freshman team selections by the coaches. Morris was also a National Association of Basketball Coaches (NABC) Division I District 7 All-District second team choice.

== Postseason ==
The team earned the number four seed in the 2011 Big Ten Conference men's basketball tournament, based on the Big Ten tiebreaker. In the 2011 Big Ten Conference men's basketball tournament, they earned a bye in the first round as the number 4 seed. Then, in the second round, they defeated Illinois 60–55. In the conference semifinals, they lost to Ohio State 68–61. During the game, Hardaway set the Michigan freshman single-season three-point shots made record.

Michigan earned a #8 Seed in the 2011 NCAA Division I men's basketball tournament, where they defeated Tennessee by a 75–45 margin in the first round. During the victory, they established two NCAA Men's Division I Basketball Championship records: The largest victory margin by an eight seed, and the first team to ever win a tournament game without making a free throw. The game was the second largest NCAA tournament victory margin in Michigan history (surpassed by the 1989 NCAA Division I men's basketball tournament victory over Virginia). It also marked the ninth straight time that John Beilein led a team victory in its first game of a postseason tournament (5 NCAA and 4 NIT).

Michigan Wolverines men's basketball single-season 200 assist club
Player	Season	Games	Assists
Trey Burke	2012–13	39	260
Zavier Simpson	2018–19	37	244
Zavier Simpson	2019–20	30	236
Darius Morris	2010–11	35	235
Gary Grant	1987–88	34	234
Rumeal Robinson	1988–89	37	233

In the second round of the tournament, the team opposed Duke. Duke prevailed 73–71. In the game, Morris set a new Michigan single-season assist record with a total of 235. The matchup came in the week following the media storm that erupted as a result of comments made in the ESPN films 30 for 30 documentary The Fab Five by Fab Five member and former Wolverine Jalen Rose. The controversy spread to The Washington Post where columnist Jason Reid noted that the film went out of its way to present inappropriate racial commentary when it described Duke basketball head coach Mike Krzyzewski recruits as Uncle Toms. Among those critical of the racial commentary was Duke player Grant Hill who was cited in an Associated Press story that ran in major national media outlets. In fact, Hill blogged on The New York Times with a response. Hill's response was the most emailed story in The New York Times and was shared on Facebook by nearly a 100,000 people within its first few days.

Hardaway set the Michigan freshman single-season three-point shots made record. Morris set the Michigan single-season assist record with a total of 235. His average of 6.71 per game led the Big Ten and Jordan Morgan led the Big Ten in field goal percentage. The team finished last in blocked shots and offensive rebounds in the conference.

Hardaway was one of 21 players selected to the 2011 Collegeinsider.com Freshmen All-America selection on March 25. Following the season, Darius Morris sought the advice of the NBA's undergraduate advisory committee to determine his draft prospects. On 4 May, Morris announced his final decision not to withdraw his name prior to the 8 May deadline and to enter June 23 2011 NBA draft. Morris was selected by the Los Angeles Lakers with the 41st overall selection in the 2nd round of the 2011 NBA Draft. Following the season Hardaway was invited to the 17 – 24 June 2011 17-man tryouts for the 12-man FIBA Under-19 World Championship team by USA Basketball. The 12 selected players will compete as Team USA in the 2011 FIBA U19 World Championships in Latvia from June 30 – July 10, 2011. He made the final roster along with two other Big Ten rivals.

== Schedule and results ==
Date time, TV	Rank^{#}	Opponent^{#}	Result	Record	High points	High rebounds	High assists	Site (attendance) city, state
Exhibition
November 5, 2010*; 7:00 pm ET, BTN.com		Saginaw Valley State	W 68–59	—	18 – Morris	15 – Morgan	2 – 2 tied	Crisler Arena (8,470); Ann Arbor, MI
Regular Season
November 13, 2010*; 7:00 pm, BTN.com		USC Upstate	W 66–35	1–0	19 – Hardaway Jr.	8 – Novak	4 – Morris	Crisler Arena (7,632); Ann Arbor, MI
November 18, 2010*; 7:00 pm, BTN		Bowling Green; Legends Classic	W 69–50	2–0	14 – Smotrycz	8 – 2 tied	11 – Morris	Crisler Arena (7,852); Ann Arbor, MI
November 21, 2010; 2:00 pm, BTN.com		Gardner-Webb; Legends Classic	W 80–58	3–0	21 – Morris	8 – Morgan	10 – Morris	Crisler Arena (7,157); Ann Arbor, MI
November 26, 2010*; 8:00 pm, HDNet		vs. No. 9 Syracuse; Legends Classic Semifinals	L 50–53	3–1	11 – 2 tied	8 – Morgan	6 – Morris	Boardwalk Hall (6,273); Atlantic City, NJ
November 27, 2010*; 5:30 pm, HDNet		vs. UTEP; Legends Classic Third Place	L 56–65	3–2	20 – Morris	7 – Morris	4 – Morris	Boardwalk Hall (5,273); Atlantic City, NJ
November 30, 2010*; 9:00 pm, ESPN2		at Clemson; ACC–Big Ten Challenge	W 69–61	4–2	18 – Smotrycz	7 – Morris	8 – Morris	Littlejohn Coliseum (7,237); Clemson, SC
December 4, 2010*; 1:00 pm, BTN		Harvard	W 65–62	5–2	19 – Douglass	11 – Novak	5 – Morris	Crisler Arena (9,559); Ann Arbor, MI
December 6, 2010*; 7:30 pm, BTN		Concordia (MI)	W 86–65	6–2	23 – Morgan	14 – Novak	12 – Morris	Crisler Arena (9,016); Ann Arbor, MI
December 10, 2010*; 6:30 pm, BTN		Utah	W 75–64	7–2	19 – Morris	9 – Novak	10 – Morris	Crisler Arena (9,634); Ann Arbor, MI
December 14, 10*; 7:00 pm, BTN		North Carolina Central	W 64–44	8–2	12 – Morris	9 – Horford	4 – Hardaway Jr.	Crisler Arena (8,740); Ann Arbor, MI
December 18, 2010*; 12:00 pm, ESPN3		Oakland	W 69–51	9–2	18 – Morris	12 – Novak	5 – Morris	Crisler Arena (9,738); Ann Arbor, MI
December 23, 2010*; 6:00 pm, BTN		Bryant	W 87–71	10–2	26 – Morris	6 – 2 tied	12 – Morris	Crisler Arena (8,758); Ann Arbor, MI
December 28, 2010; 2:00 pm, BTN		No. 12 Purdue	L 57–80	10–3 (0–1)	15 – Douglass	5 – 2 tied	6 – Morris	Crisler Arena (13,751); Ann Arbor, MI
January 2, 2011; 4:00 pm, BTN		Penn State	W 76–69	11–3 (1–1)	20 – Morris	9 – Morgan	10 – Morris	Crisler Arena (11,771); Ann Arbor, MI
January 5, 2011; 8:30 pm, BTN		at Wisconsin	L 50–66	11–4 (1–2)	15 – Novak	5 – Novak	3 – 3 tied	Kohl Center (17,230); Madison, WI
January 9, 2011*; 4:30 pm, CBS		No. 3 Kansas	L 60–67 ^{OT}	11–5	19 – Hardaway Jr.	11 – Novak	7 – Morris	Crisler Arena (12,476); Ann Arbor, MI
January 12, 2011; 6:30 pm, BTN		No. 2 Ohio State	L 64–68	11–6 (1–3)	18 – Morris	6 – Smotrycz	8 – Morris	Crisler Arena (11,994); Ann Arbor, MI
January 15, 2011; 8:00 pm, BTN		at Indiana	L 61–80	11–7 (1–4)	22 – Morris	5 – Morgan	7 – Morris	Assembly Hall (17,168); Bloomington, IN
January 18, 2011; 9:00 pm, BTN		at Northwestern	L 60–74	11–8 (1–5)	17 – Douglass	7 – 2 tied	4 – Morris	Welsh-Ryan Arena (5,192); Evanston, IL
January 22, 2011; 7:00 pm, BTN		No. 15 Minnesota	L 64–69	11–9 (1–6)	20 – Hardaway Jr.	3 – 2 tied	6 – Douglass	Crisler Arena (12,378); Ann Arbor, MI
January 27, 2011; 7:00 pm, ESPN		at No. 25 Michigan State	W 61–57	12–9 (2–6)	19 – Novak	8 – Hardaway Jr.	8 – Morris	Breslin Student Events Center (14,797); East Lansing, MI
January 30, 2011; 4:00 pm, BTN		Iowa	W 87–73	13–9 (3–6)	19 – Hardaway Jr.	10 – Morris	11 – Morris	Crisler Arena (12,978); Ann Arbor, MI
February 3, 2011; 7:00 pm, ESPN		No. 1 Ohio State	L 53–62	13–10 (3–7)	15 – Hardaway Jr.	6 – Novak	4 – Morris	Jerome Schottenstein Center (18,809); Columbus, OH
February 6, 2011; 12:00 pm, BTN		at Penn State	W 65–62	14–10 (4–7)	23 – Morris	11 – Morgan	3 – 2 tied	Bryce Jordan Center (8,302); State College, PA
February 9, 2011; 6:30 pm, BTN		Northwestern	W 75–66	15–10 (5–7)	27 – Morgan	10 – Hardaway Jr.	7 – Morris	Crisler Arena (10,198); Ann Arbor, MI
February 12, 2011; 4:00 pm, BTN		Indiana	W 73–69	16–10 (6–7)	26 – Hardaway Jr.	7 – Novak	6 – Novak	Crisler Arena (13,751); Ann Arbor, MI
February 16, 2011; 8:30 pm, BTN		at Illinois	L 52–54	16–11 (6–8)	12 – Morgan	8 – Novak	7 – Morris	Assembly Hall (16,273); Champaign, IL
February 19, 2011; 4:30 pm, BTN		at Iowa	W 75–72 ^{OT}	17–11 (7–8)	30 – Hardaway Jr.	8 – Morgan	9 – Morris	Carver-Hawkeye Arena (13,835); Iowa City, IA
February 23, 2011; 6:30 pm, BTN		No. 12 Wisconsin	L 52–53	17–12 (7–9)	16 – Hardaway Jr.	6 – Novak	4 – Morris	Crisler Arena (11,023); Ann Arbor, MI
February 26, 2011; 4:30 pm, BTN		at Minnesota	W 70–63	18–12 (8–9)	22 – Hardaway Jr.	6 – Morgan	7 – Morris	Williams Arena (14,625); Minneapolis, MN
March 5, 2011; 2:00 pm, CBS		Michigan State	W 70–63	19–12 (9–9)	20 – Hardaway Jr.	6 – Morgan	6 – Morris	Crisler Arena (13,751); Ann Arbor, MI
Big Ten tournament
March 11, 2011; 2:30 pm, ESPN	(4)	vs. (5) Illinois; Big Ten Quarterfinals	W 60–55	20–12	17 – Morris	7 – Douglass	7 – Morris	Conseco Fieldhouse (17,975); Indianapolis, IN
March 12, 2011; 1:40 pm, CBS	(4)	vs. (1) No. 1 Ohio State; Big Ten Semifinals	L 61–68	20–13	16 – Morris	6 – 2 tied	3 – Morris	Conseco Fieldhouse (18,377); Indianapolis, IN
NCAA tournament
March 18, 2011; 12:40 pm, truTV	(8 W)	vs. (9 W) Tennessee; NCAA Second Round	W 75–45	21–13	14 – Novak	10 – Novak	9 – Morris	Time Warner Cable Arena (16,829); Charlotte, NC
March 20, 2011; 2:45 pm, CBS	(8 W)	vs. (1 W) No. 3 Duke; NCAA Third Round	L 71–73	21–14	16 – Morris	5 – Novak	6 – Morris	Time Warner Cable Arena (18,329); Charlotte, NC
*Non-conference game. ^{#}Rankings from AP Poll. (#) Tournament seedings in parentheses. W=NCAA West Regional.

== Statistics ==
The team posted the following statistics:

Name	GP	GS	Min	Avg	FG	FGA	FG%	3FG	3FGA	3FG%	FT	FTA	FT%	OR	DR	RB	Avg	Ast	Avg	PF	DQ	TO	Stl	Blk	Pts	Avg
Darius Morris	35	34	1219	34.8	201	411	0.489	16	64	0.250	108	151	0.715	31	108	139	4.0	235	6.7	74	0	103	36	1	526	15.0
Tim Hardaway Jr.	35	35	1075	30.7	159	379	0.420	76	207	0.367	91	119	0.765	27	106	133	3.8	59	1.7	68	0	45	34	5	485	13.9
Jordan Morgan	35	35	841	24.0	141	225	0.627	0	0		41	73	0.562	73	115	188	5.4	18	0.5	111	2	53	21	19	323	9.2
Zack Novak	35	35	1223	34.9	92	240	0.383	65	169	0.385	64	77	0.831	30	173	203	5.8	56	1.6	84	3	28	21	5	313	8.9
Stu Douglass	35	12	1065	30.4	97	238	0.408	53	148	0.358	3	13	0.231	17	87	104	3.0	59	1.7	62	0	42	24	9	250	7.1
Evan Smotrycz	35	24	623	17.8	77	192	0.401	45	118	0.381	20	29	0.690	23	58	81	2.3	24	0.7	84	3	31	17	9	219	6.3
Matt Vogrich	34	0	476	14.0	39	91	0.429	24	62	0.387	8	12	0.667	15	41	56	1.6	15	0.4	29	0	14	10	2	110	3.2
Jon Horford	29	0	196	6.8	22	46	0.478	1	8	0.125	13	18	0.722	18	40	58	2.0	3	0.1	40	0	10	1	11	58	2.0
Blake McLimans	25	0	135	5.4	13	41	0.317	1	19	0.053	2	2	1.000	9	11	20	0.8	4	0.2	16	0	3	3	8	29	1.2
Eso Akunne	16	0	40	2.5	3	7	0.429	1	3	0.333	0	1	0.000	0	5	5	0.3	4	0.3	3	0	1	0	0	7	0.4
Colton Christian	27	0	126	4.7	2	11	0.182	0	0		0	2	0.000	13	23	36	1.3	2	0.1	13	0	7	1	0	4	0.2
Josh Bartelstein	11	0	19	1.7	1	7	0.143	1	5	0.200	0	1	0.000	1	0	1	0.1	0	0.0	1	0	0	0	0	3	0.3
Corey Person	5	0	9	1.8	0	1	0.000	0	1	0.000	1	4	0.250	0	0	0	0.0	1	0.2	1	0	2	0	0	1	0.2
Darrick Ervin	3	0	3	1.0	0	0		0	0		0	0		0	0	0	0.0	0	0.0	1	0	0	0	0	0	0.0
TEAM	35													32	59	91	2.6					12				
Season Total	35				847	1889	0.448	283	804	0.352	351	502	0.699	289	826	1115	31.9	480	13.7	587	8	351	168	69	2328	66.5
Opponents	35				795	1854	0.429	222	696	0.319	375	553	0.678	335	843	1178	33.7	451	12.9	580		409	150	100	2187	62.5

== Team players drafted into the NBA ==
So far two players from this team have been selected in the NBA draft.

Year	Round	Pick	Overall	Player	NBA club
2011	2	11	41	Darius Morris	Los Angeles Lakers
2013	1	24	24	Tim Hardaway Jr.	New York Knicks
