= Spike Albrecht =

American basketball player (born 1992)

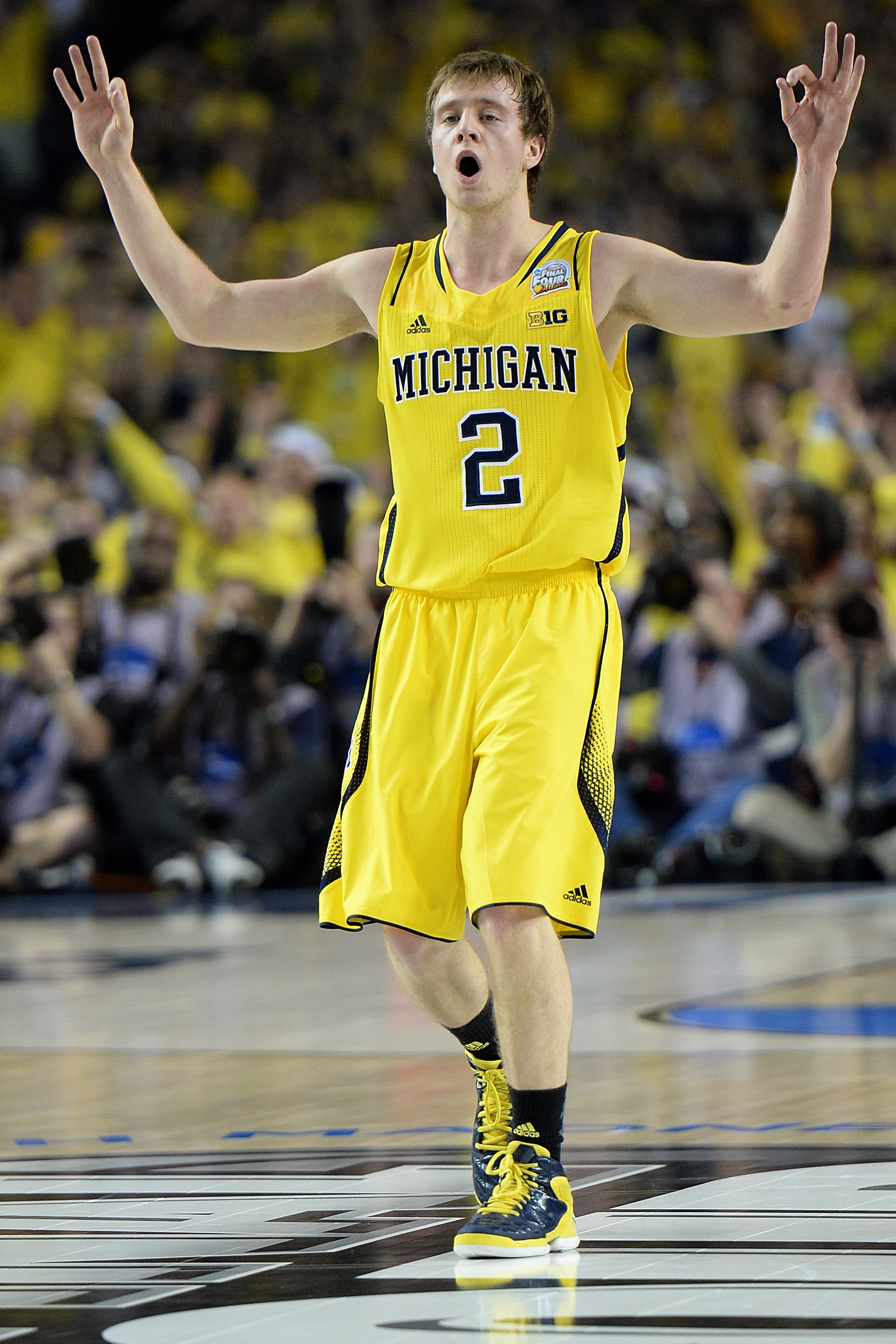
- Albrecht at the 2013 NCAA tournament against Louisville

Personal information
- Born: August 24, 1992 (age 34) Crown Point, Indiana, U.S.
- Listed height: 5 ft 11 in (1.80 m)
- Listed weight: 175 lb (79 kg)

Career information
- High school: Crown Point (Crown Point, Indiana); Northfield Mount Hermon (Gill, Massachusetts)
- College: Michigan (2012–2016); Purdue (2016–2017)
- NBA draft: 2017: undrafted

Career history

Coaching
- 2019–2020: Northfield Mount Hermon (H.S., assistant)
- 2020–2021: Louisville (GA)
- 2021–2022: Purdue (GA)

Michael Joseph "Spike" Albrecht (born August 24, 1992) is a former college basketball player who completed his collegiate eligibility as a redshirt fifth year graduate transfer student for the 2016–17 Purdue Boilermakers team. Albrecht played high school basketball in his hometown of Crown Point, Indiana. He played his undergraduate college career for the Michigan Wolverines. He is most well known for his 17-point first half performance off the bench for the 2012–13 Wolverines in the championship game of the 2013 NCAA Men's Division I Basketball Tournament. He won Big Ten Conference regular season championships with the 2013–14 Wolverines and 2016–17 Boilermakers.

== Early life ==
At age five, Michael Albrecht, son of Tammy and Charles "Chuck" Albrecht, received his first baseball spikes and refused to take them off, earning his now famous nickname. Chuck now runs a summer basketball camp at which Spike assists. Albrecht attended Taft Middle School in Crown Point before attending Crown Point High School where he averaged 21 points, five assists, three steals and four rebounds as a senior in 2011. Albrecht committed to Michigan on April 6, 2012. Albrecht led Northfield Mount Hermon School to the 2012 New England Preparatory School Athletic Council (NEPSAC) Class AAA Boys' Basketball Tournament, defeating future Michigan teammate Mitch McGary's Brewster Academy in the semifinals. Albrecht was awarded the Most Valuable Player (MVP) of the tournament. Albrecht was a former Amateur Athletic Union (AAU) teammate of McGary and future Michigan teammate Glenn Robinson III. Albrecht's father was college teammates with Zack Novak's father; a generation later, when Spike Albrecht was an incoming freshman, Zack Novak was Michigan's captain during the 2011–12 season.

College recruiting
Name	Hometown	School	Height	Weight	Commit date
Spike Albrecht; PG	Crown Point, Indiana	Crown Point High School (IN)/ Northfield Mount Hermon School (MA)	6 ft 0.5 in (1.84 m)	180 lb (82 kg)	Apr 6, 2012
Spike Albrecht; PG	Recruit ratings: Rivals: (79)				
Overall recruit ranking: ESPN: 112 (PG), 36 (IN)
Note: In many cases, Scout, Rivals, 247Sports, On3, and ESPN may conflict in their listings of height and weight.; In these cases, the average was taken. ESPN grades are on a 100-point scale.; Sources: "Michigan 2012 Basketball Commitments". Rivals.; "2012 Michigan Basketball Commits". Scout.; "ESPN". ESPN.; "Scout.com Team Recruiting Rankings". Scout.; "2012 Team Ranking". Rivals.

== College career ==
=== Michigan (2012–2016) ===
==== Freshman season (2012–2013) ====
The 2011–12 Michigan Wolverines men's basketball team had been co-champions of 2011–12 Big Ten Conference, but lost both of its co-captains, Zack Novak and Stu Douglass, to graduation and three players as transfers. The team was returning a nucleus of All-Big Ten players Trey Burke and Tim Hardaway Jr.

Michigan–Minnesota 2013–14 Big Ten season opener
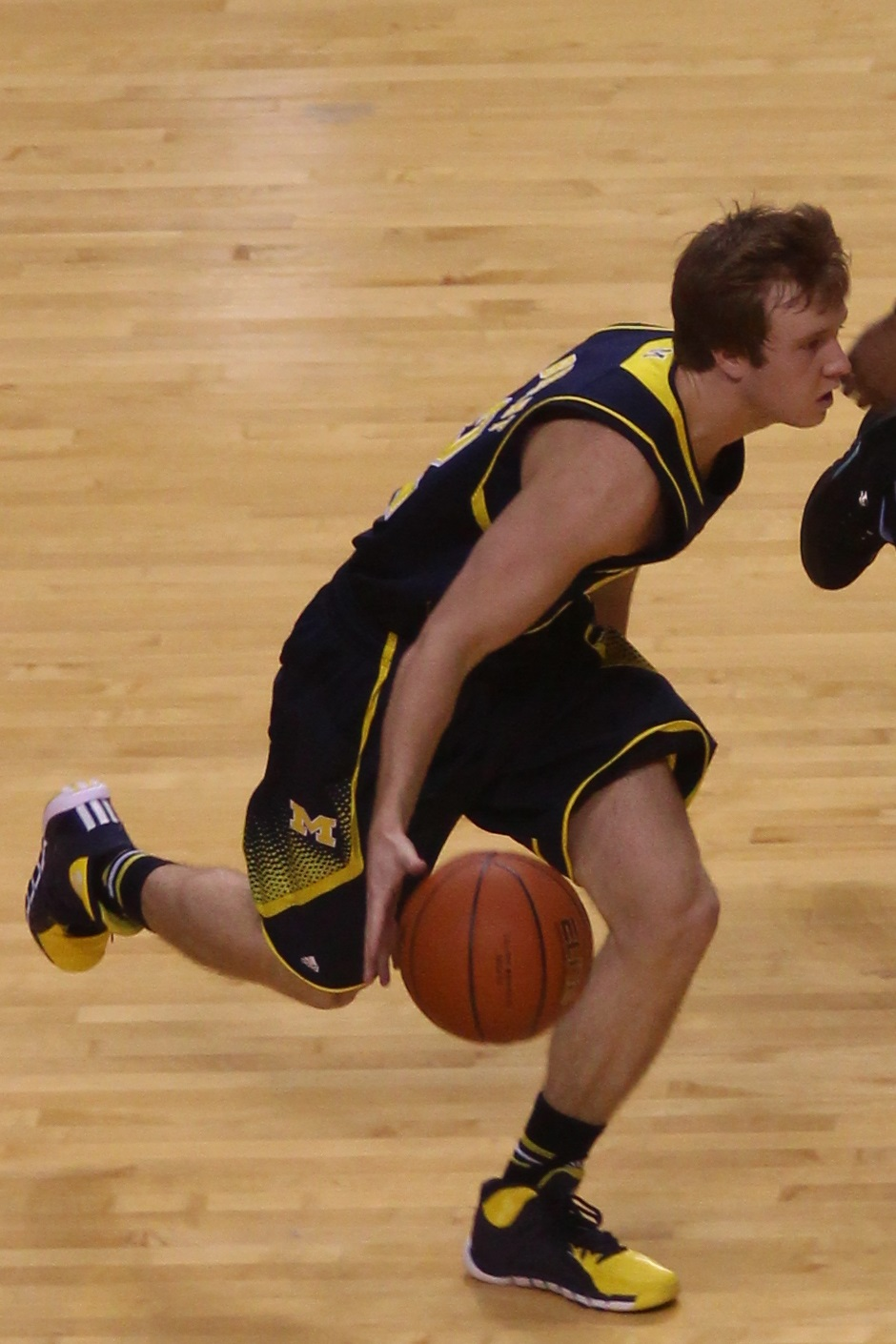
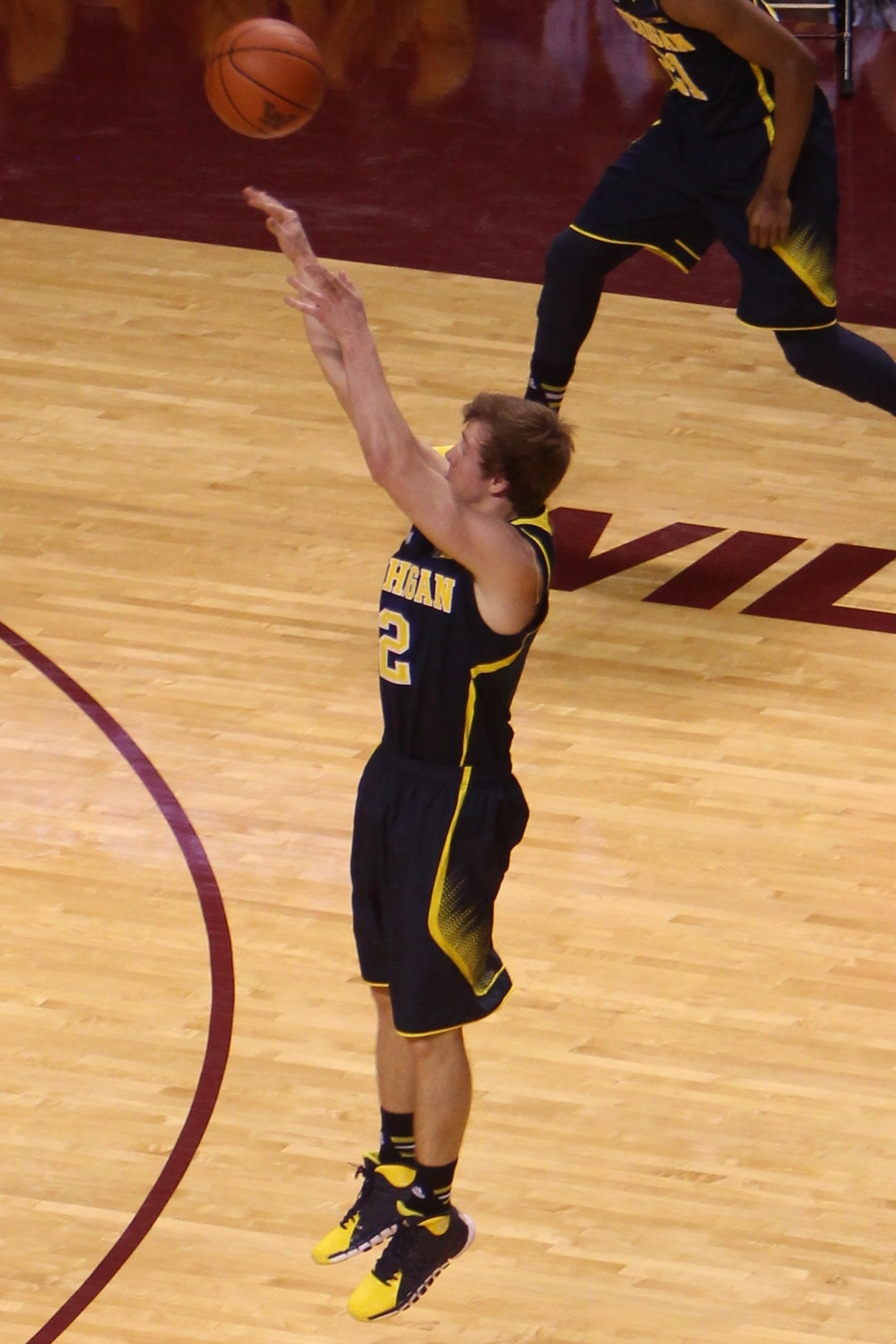

In Albrecht's role with the 2012–13 Wolverines team, he never scored more than 7 points in a game before the NCAA Tournament. In the regional finals on March 31 against Florida, Michigan built a 13–0 lead and never led by less than 10 the rest of the game. Several players had career-highs in the game, including Albrecht who had 7 points and 3 steals. The national championship rounds were held at the Georgia Dome in Atlanta, Georgia. In the April 6 national semifinal against Syracuse, Michigan emerged with its thirty-first victory, the most since the 1992–93 team went 31–5. The bench contributed 22 points, including 6 from Albrecht, who raised his NCAA tournament total to 5-for-5 on three-point shots.

Michigan advanced to the April 8, 2013 NCAA Men's Division I Basketball Tournament championship game where the team lost to Midwest number one seed Louisville by an 82–76 margin despite 17 points, including 4-for-5 three-point shooting, from Albrecht in the game. Albrecht scored 17 first-half points on 4-for-4 three-point shooting. Albrecht made the seven-man All-Tournament team (which was revised multiple times) along with teammates McGary and Trey Burke. By the end of the first half of the game, Albrecht had tied Sam Cassell by making his first 9 three-point shots in his NCAA tournament games that season, and USA Today described Albrecht's place in history as "amongst the most unexpected NCAA heroes in history".

==== Sophomore season (2013–2014) ====
Albrecht for the 2014–15 Wolverines at Welsh-Ryan Arena
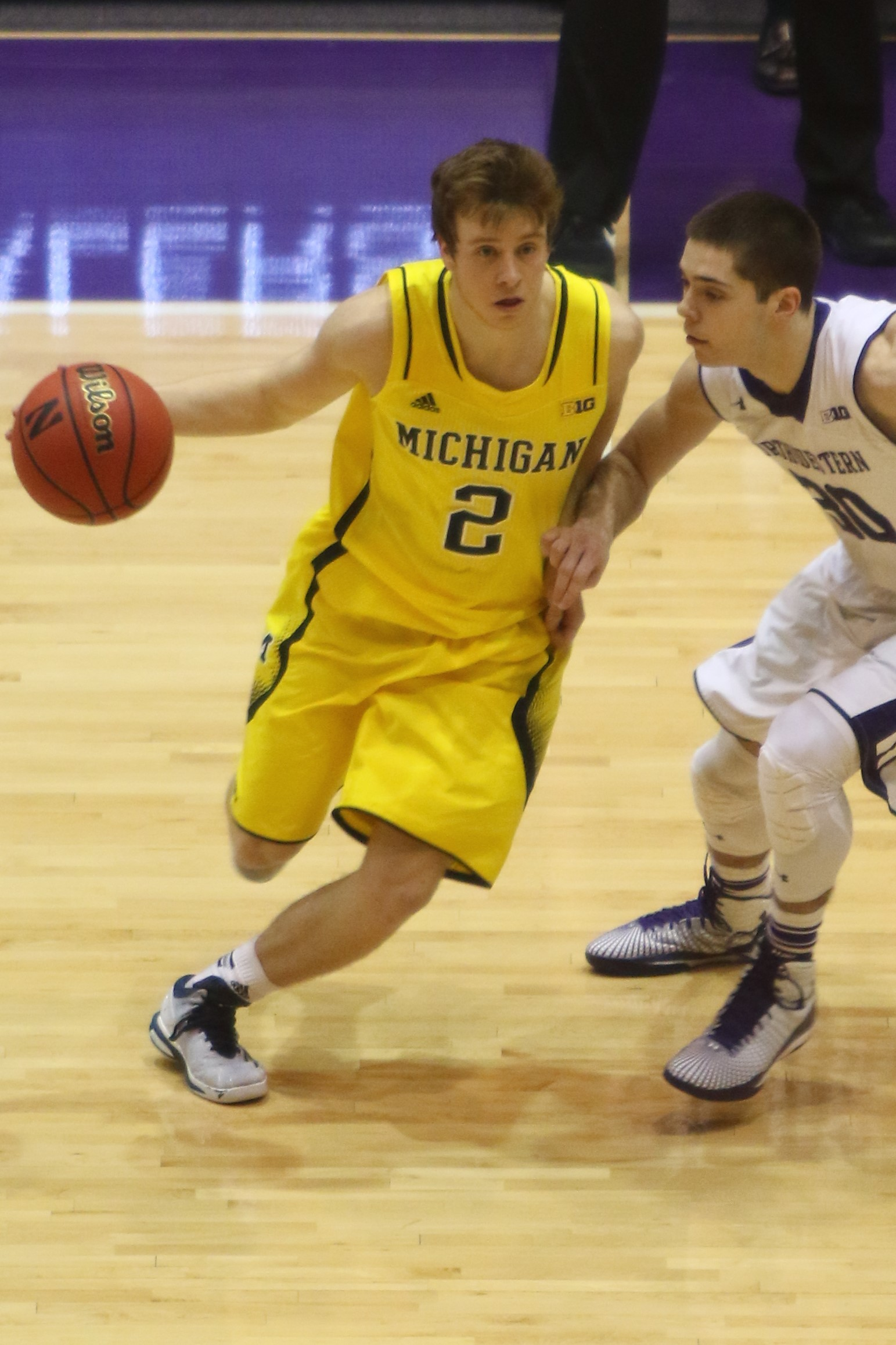
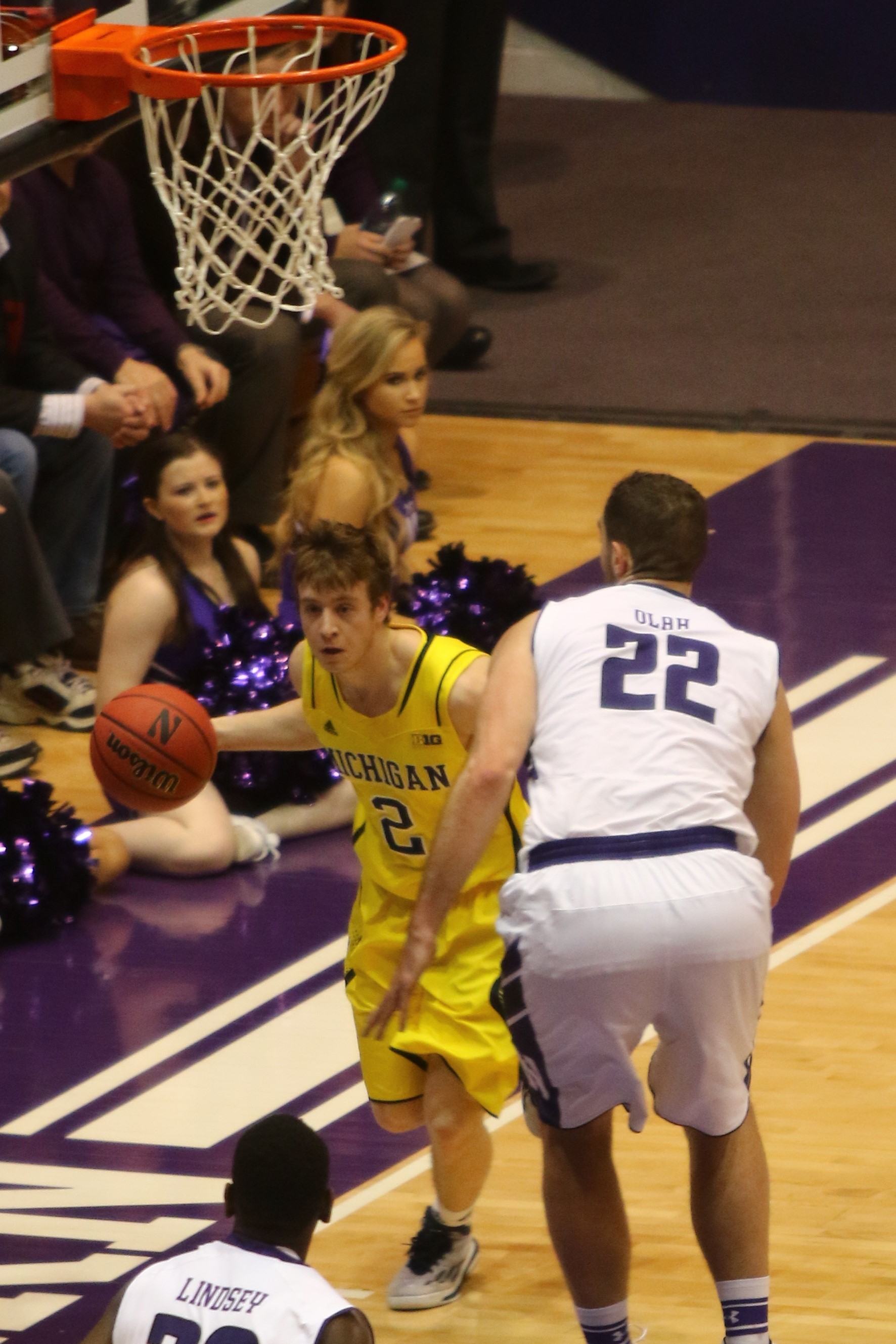

Albrecht established a career high with 6 assists as Michigan defeated Houston Baptist by 54 points on December 7, 2013. On January 22, 2014, against (#10 AP Poll/Coaches' Poll) Iowa, Albrecht made his first career start, posting new career highs of 7 assists and 4 steals, tying a career high with 3 rebounds and helping Michigan defeat consecutive ranked opponents for the first time since the 1996–97 team. Albrecht started in place of Derrick Walton who had the flu. Michigan clinched its first outright (unshared) Big Ten Conference championship since 1985–86. The 2013–14 team advanced to the elite eight round of the 2014 NCAA Men's Division I Basketball Tournament before being eliminated by Kentucky.

==== Junior season (2014–2015) ====
Albrecht was named co-captain of the 2014–15 team along with Caris LeVert. On November 29, he contributed a then career-high 7 assists against Nicholls State. Then on December 2, Albrecht posted a new career high with 9 assists and broke a 63–63 deadlock with a 31 seconds remaining to lead Michigan to a 68–65 victory over Syracuse. On January 3, 2015, against Purdue, Albrecht tied his career high with 17 points. On February 1 Albrecht tallied a career-high 18-points in the rivalry game against Michigan State. The March 3 double-overtime loss against Northwestern marked Albrecht's 8th consecutive double-digit scoring game as he picked up the scoring slack in the absence of Caris LeVert and Derrick Walton, who missed their 11th and 9th consecutive games. On March 7 against Rutgers, the streak ended, but Albrecht posted a career-high 9 assists. In April 2015, Albrecht had offseason surgery on his right hip to correct for a genetic condition. On December 2, Albrecht was named an Allstate Good Works Team nominee.

==== Senior season (2015–2016) ====
On December 11, 2015, Albrecht announced he would sit out the rest of the season for the 2015–16 Wolverines team due to injuries. During his career at Michigan, Albrecht played in 115 career games, and was named Michigan's co-MVP during the 2014–15 season, after starting 18 of 31 games and posting a career-best 7.5 points per game, while battling hip problems. On March 29, Albrecht announced that he would use the graduate transfer option to play a fifth year at another school. On April 1, head coach John Beilein decided not to restrict Albrecht or teammate Ricky Doyle from transferring to schools within the Big Ten if they desired to do so. By April 18, Albrecht was considering interest from home state Big Ten programs Purdue and Indiana as well as Wichita State, Texas A&M, Syracuse, USC, and Milwaukee (where Michigan assistant coach LaVall Jordan had just taken over as head coach).

=== Purdue (2016–2017) ===
It was announced on May 3, 2016, that Albrecht would play his final year of collegiate basketball at Purdue University. With their win over Indiana on February 28, 2017, Purdue clinched at least a share of the Big Ten regular season championship. With Wisconsin's loss on March 2, Purdue clinched an outright championship, their 23rd championship, the most in Big Ten history.

== Coaching career ==
After earning his graduate degree from Purdue in 2017, Albrecht began his professional career in medical device sales. By October 2019, Albrecht was living in Nashville. Albrecht spent the 2019–20 season as an assistant coach at Northfield Mount Hermon. During the COVID-19 pandemic in the United States, Albrecht began giving ball handling instructional videos with his sister on Zoom Video. Also in March 2020, Albrecht emailed Louisville's director of men's basketball operations, Kahil Fennell, (as well as someone at Villanova); Fennell responded that same day. Albrecht joined the Louisville staff as a graduate assistant in June. On May 28, 2021, Albrecht came back to Purdue as a graduate assistant.
