= 2011–12 Michigan Wolverines men's basketball team =

American college basketball season

2011–12 Michigan Wolverines men's basketball

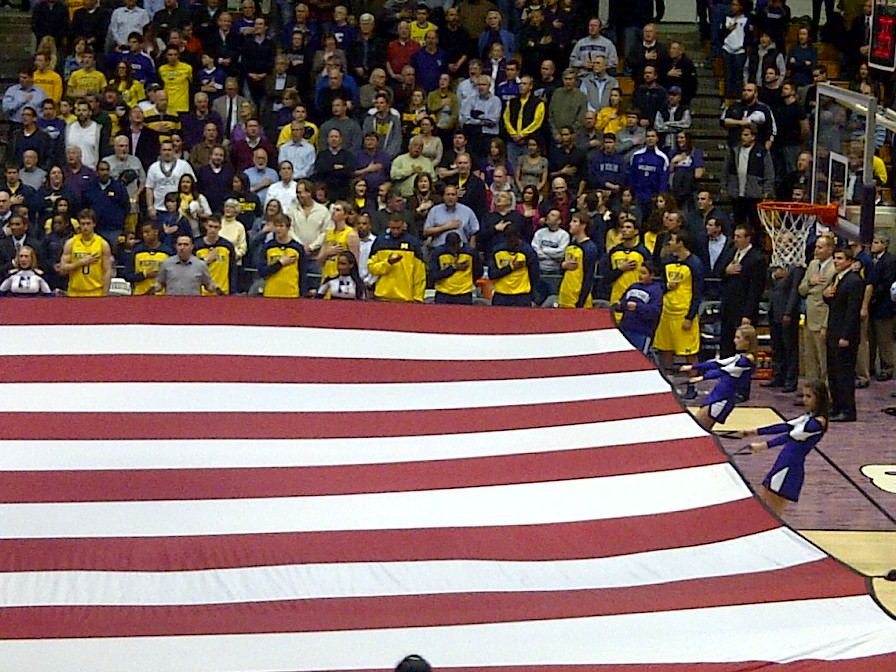

Big Ten regular season co-champions

NCAA tournament, Round of 64
- Conference: Big Ten Conference

Ranking
- Coaches: No. 22
- AP: No. 13
- Record: 24–10 (13–5 Big Ten)
- Head coach: John Beilein (5th season)
- Assistant coaches: Jeff Meyer; LaVall Jordan; Bacari Alexander
- MVP: Trey Burke
- Captains: Zack Novak; Stu Douglass
- Home arena: Crisler Center

2011–12 Big Ten Conference men's basketball standings
	Conf.				Overall
Team	W		L	PCT	W		L	PCT
No. 5 Michigan State†	13	–	5	.722	29	–	8	.784
No. 13 Michigan	13	–	5	.722	24	–	10	.706
No. 7 Ohio State	13	–	5	.722	31	–	8	.795
No. 14 Wisconsin	12	–	6	.667	26	–	10	.722
No. 16 Indiana	11	–	7	.611	27	–	9	.750
Purdue	10	–	8	.556	22	–	13	.629
Northwestern	8	–	10	.444	19	–	14	.576
Iowa	8	–	10	.444	18	–	17	.514
Illinois	6	–	12	.333	17	–	15	.531
Minnesota	6	–	12	.333	23	–	15	.605
Nebraska	4	–	14	.222	12	–	18	.400
Penn State	4	–	14	.222	12	–	20	.375
† 2012 Big Ten tournament winner Rankings from AP poll

The 2011–12 Michigan Wolverines men's basketball team represented the University of Michigan during the 2011–12 NCAA Division I men's basketball season. The team played its home games in Ann Arbor, Michigan at Crisler Center for the 45th consecutive year. It had a seating capacity of 12,721. It was also the team's 95th straight season as a member of the Big Ten Conference. Fifth-year head coach John Beilein led the team, alongside All-Big Ten players Trey Burke, Tim Hardaway Jr. and Zack Novak. Burke was named Big Ten Freshman of the Year and was Michigan's first Associated Press All-American honoree since 1998.

The team's season began with a preseason media day and practices in October 2011. In February 2012, Michigan hosted ESPN's College GameDay for the first time in a game against Ohio State. It was the eighth time a Big Ten team hosted the show, which began in 2005.

The team was in the national rankings all season and ended as the 2011–12 Big Ten co-champion with Michigan State and Ohio State. It had three victories over teams ranked in the top 10 at the time of the meeting (eighth-ranked Memphis, ninth-ranked Michigan State and sixth-ranked Ohio State). The team was undefeated at home until its last home game of the season. Michigan lost in the semifinals of the 2012 Big Ten Conference tournament and bowed out in the second round of the 2012 NCAA tournament to end the season with a 24–10 record. The team won the school's first Big Ten Conference Championship since the 1985–86 season and had the school's best Big Ten record (13–5) since the 1993–94 season.

== Preseason ==
=== 2011–12 incoming team members ===
Before the season began, point guard Darius Morris, the Big Ten assists leader in the 2010–11 season, left the team after being drafted by the Los Angeles Lakers. The incoming class included Carlton Brundidge and 2011 Ohio Mr. Basketball point guard Trey Burke. Both Brundidge and Burke were among Scout.com's top 100 players of the 2011 class; Brundidge ranked 98th and Burke ranked 94th. Max Bielfeldt committed to Michigan in April despite his family's ties to the Illinois Fighting Illini. Illinois University's Bielfeldt Athletic Administration Building was endowed by his family. Sai Tummala, who along with Bielfeldt was recruited by Ivy League schools, rounded out the incoming class. Tummala earned an academic scholarship and was considered a walk-on candidate for the basketball team.

Tim Hardaway Jr., son of former NBA All-Star Tim Hardaway, returned to the team. He was coming off a freshman season in which he was a unanimous Big Ten All-Freshman, All-Big Ten honorable mention, Collegeinsider.com Freshmen All-America and Team USA FIBA U19 honoree. Jordan Dumars, the son of Detroit Pistons All-Star Joe Dumars, left the team, citing nagging knee issues.

=== 2011–12 team recruits ===
College recruiting information
Name	Hometown	School	Height	Weight	Commit date
Trey Burke; PG	Columbus, Ohio	Northland High School (OH)	6 ft 1 in (1.85 m)	170 lb (77 kg)	Aug 24, 2010
Trey Burke; PG	Recruit ratings: Scout: Rivals: (93)				
Carlton Brundidge; SG/PG	Southfield, Michigan	Southfield High School (MI)	6 ft 1 in (1.85 m)	200 lb (91 kg)	Sep 21, 2009
Carlton Brundidge; SG/PG	Recruit ratings: Scout: Rivals: (94)				
Max Bielfeldt; PF	Peoria, Illinois	Notre Dame High School (IL)	6 ft 8 in (2.03 m)	240 lb (110 kg)	Mar 25, 2011
Max Bielfeldt; PF	Recruit ratings: Scout: Rivals: (87)				
Sai Tummala; SF	Phoenix, AZ	Brophy Prep School (AZ)	6 ft 6 in (1.98 m)	190 lb (86 kg)	
Sai Tummala; SF	Recruit ratings: Scout: Rivals: (77)				
Overall recruit ranking:
Note: In many cases, Scout, Rivals, 247Sports, On3, and ESPN may conflict in their listings of height and weight.; In these cases, the average was taken. ESPN grades are on a 100-point scale.; Sources: "Michigan 2011 Basketball Commitments". Rivals.; "2011 Michigan Basketball Commits". Scout.; "ESPN". ESPN.; "Scout.com Team Recruiting Rankings". Scout.; "2011 Team Ranking". Rivals.

== Roster ==
2011–12 Michigan Wolverines men's basketball team
Players
Coaches

Pos.	#	Name	Height	Weight	Year	Hometown
G	0	Zack Novak (C)	6 ft 4 in (1.93 m)	210 lb (95 kg)	Sr	Chesterton, IN
G	1	Stu Douglass (C)	6 ft 3 in (1.91 m)	200 lb (91 kg)	Sr	Carmel, IN
G	2	Carlton Brundidge	6 ft 1 in (1.85 m)	190 lb (86 kg)	Fr	Southfield, MI
G	3	Trey Burke	5 ft 11 in (1.8 m)	180 lb (82 kg)	Fr	Columbus, OH
G	5	Eso Akunne	6 ft 2 in (1.88 m)	225 lb (102 kg)	Jr	Ann Arbor, MI
G	10	Tim Hardaway Jr.	6 ft 6 in (1.98 m)	200 lb (91 kg)	So	Miami, FL
G	13	Matt Vogrich	6 ft 4 in (1.93 m)	195 lb (88 kg)	Jr	Lake Forest, IL
F	15	Jon Horford	6 ft 10 in (2.08 m)	250 lb (113 kg)	So	Grand Ledge, MI
G	20	Josh Bartelstein	6 ft 3 in (1.91 m)	205 lb (93 kg)	Jr	Highland Park, IL
F	22	Blake McLimans	6 ft 10 in (2.08 m)	240 lb (109 kg)	Jr	Hamburg, NY
F	23	Evan Smotrycz	6 ft 9 in (2.06 m)	235 lb (107 kg)	So	Reading, MA
F	24	Sai Tummala	6 ft 6 in (1.98 m)	190 lb (86 kg)	Fr	Phoenix, AZ
G	32	Corey Person	6 ft 3 in (1.91 m)	205 lb (93 kg)	Sr	Kalamazoo, MI
F	44	Max Bielfeldt	6 ft 7 in (2.01 m)	240 lb (109 kg)	Fr	Peoria, IL
F	45	Colton Christian	6 ft 6 in (1.98 m)	215 lb (98 kg)	So	Bellevue, WA
C	52	Jordan Morgan	6 ft 8 in (2.03 m)	250 lb (113 kg)	RS So	Detroit, MI

Head coach

- John Beilein (Wheeling)

Assistant coach(es)

- Jeff Meyer (Taylor)
- LaVall Jordan (Butler)
- Bacari Alexander (Detroit Mercy)

Legend

- (C) Team captain
- (S) Suspended
- (I) Ineligible
- (W) Walk-on
- Injured
- Current redshirt

Roster

Former team captains Travis Conlan (1996–97 and 1997–98) and C.J. Lee (2008–09) served as director of basketball operations and administrative specialist, respectively. Peter Kahler was the team's video coordinator.

== Schedule ==
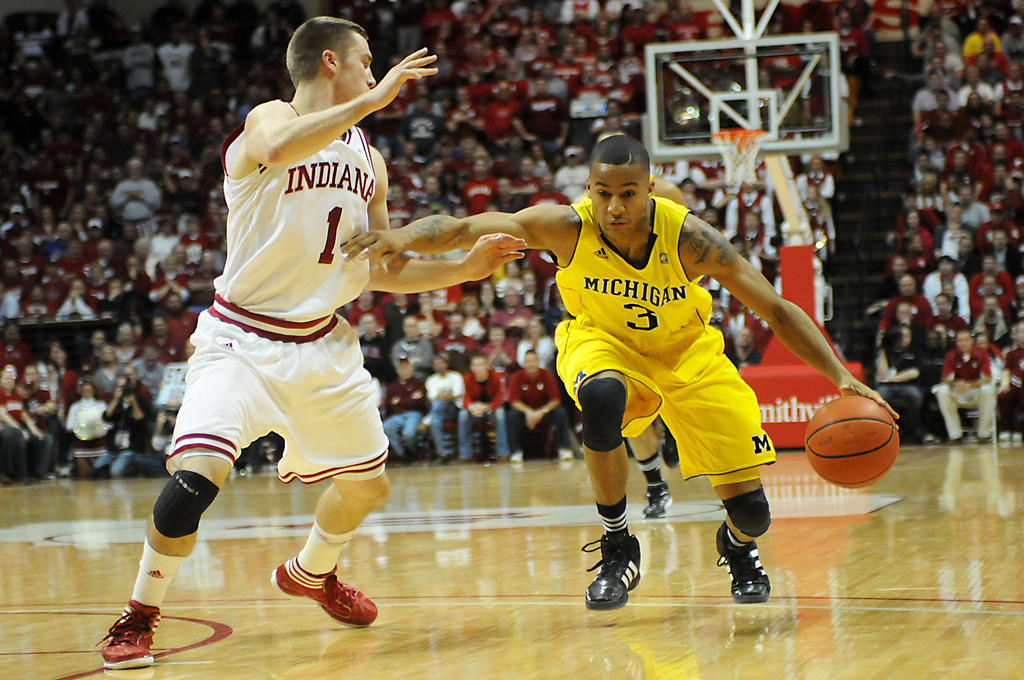
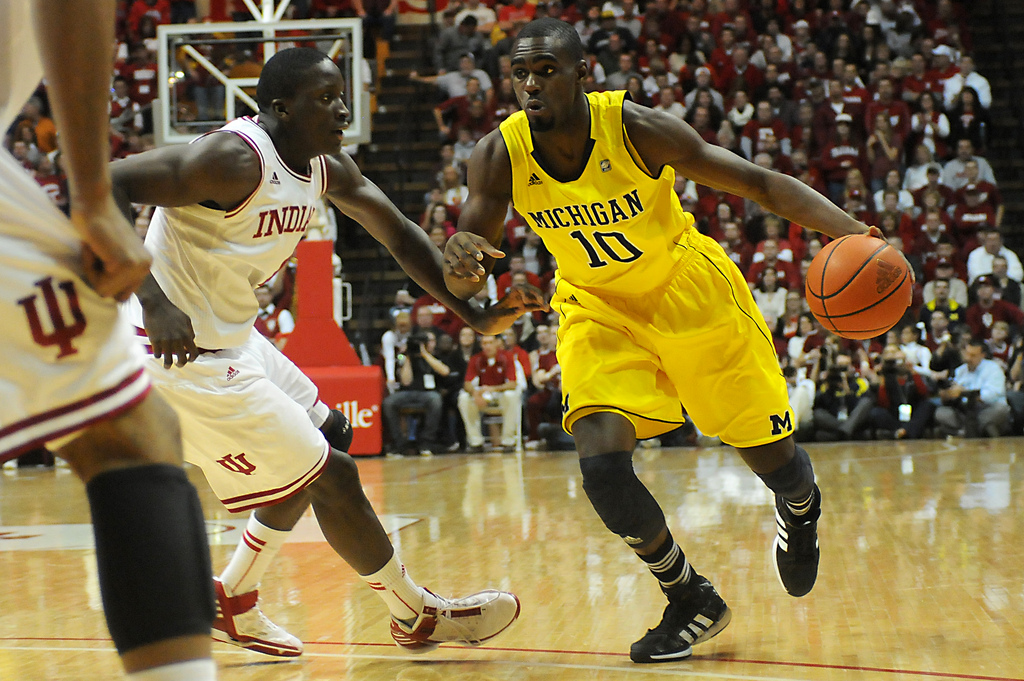
Trey Burke (above against Jordan Hulls) and Tim Hardaway Jr. (below against Victor Oladipo) for the 2011–12 team against Indiana on January 5, 2012

Michigan announced its 14-game non-conference schedule on August 1, 2011. The team began the season in a renovated Crisler Arena: new seats and a high-definition scoreboard were added, but seating capacity was reduced to 12,721 from 13,751 in the previous 10 seasons.

Michigan came in third place in the three-game 2011 Maui Invitational Tournament between November 21–23. The team defeated the eighth-ranked Memphis Tigers 73–61, lost to the sixth-ranked Duke Blue Devils 82–75, and defeated the Pac-12 favorite UCLA Bruins 79–63. Tim Hardaway Jr. was named the Big Ten Player of the Week, and Trey Burke was named Big Ten Freshman of the Week. In an ACC–Big Ten Challenge game in late November, Michigan lost to Virginia 70–58. In its next game, Michigan defeated Iowa State 76–66. On December 10, 2011, Michigan beat Oakland 90–80, its highest-scoring game since beating Northern Michigan 97–50 on November 14, 2009. It was also Michigan's first game since 2002 with three 20-point scorers (Hardaway, Burke and Evan Smotrycz). Burke earned his second Freshman of the Week honor on December 12 after scoring a season-high 20 points and nine assists in the game. On the same day, Michigan was the highest-rated Big Ten team in the Ratings Percentage Index, although the team trailed several schools in the national polls. In the final two non-conference games of the season, Smotrycz scored his first two double-doubles against Alabama A&M and Bradley on December 17 and 22.

Heading into the Big Ten Conference schedule, both of the teams Michigan had lost to were ranked (Duke was 7th and 5th in the AP and Coaches' polls and Virginia was 23rd and 24th). On December 29, Michigan won its first Big Ten Conference opener since 2006–07, beating Penn State as Smotrycz extended his double-double streak to three games. On January 2, Burke earned his first Big Ten Conference Player of the Week honor and his third Freshman of the Week honor for his 40 points in Michigan's first two conference games. On December 29 against Penn State he posted 13 points, seven assists, five rebounds and no turnovers. On January 1, 2012, he added a career-high 27 points on 8-for-11 shooting with three rebounds and three assists against Minnesota to earn Big Ten Conference Player of the Week the following day.

On January 19, Michigan became the leader in the conference with a 5–2 record, thanks to conference wins over ranked Wisconsin and Michigan State teams. Michigan remained in first place until losing to Ohio State ten days later. The team went 5–2 in conference in February, including wins over ranked Indiana and Ohio State teams. Michigan lost its final home game of the season to Purdue on February 25 to finish with a 15–1 home record. On March 1, the team defeated Illinois for their first road win in Illinois since 1995. During the game, Michigan's 30th of the season, Trey Burke broke Gary Grant's school freshman assists record, set over the course of 30 games in the 1984–85 season, by pushing his total to 143. The March 4 victory over Penn State clinched a share of the 2011–12 Big Ten Conference season regular season championship.

In the first game of the 2012 Big Ten Conference men's basketball tournament against Minnesota, Burke led the team to victory with a career-high 30 points. Burke's total was a school record for the Big Ten Conference men's basketball tournament. In the semifinal contest, however, Michigan was eliminated by Ohio State for the third year in a row. Michigan entered the 2012 NCAA Division I men's basketball tournament seeded fourth, but lost to the thirteenth-seeded Ohio Bobcats 65–60. Burke became Michigan's first Associated Press All-American honoree since Robert Traylor and Louis Bullock in 1998.

Stu Douglass concluded the season as the school's all-time leader in games played, with 136. He surpassed Loy Vaught, who played in 135 games. Novak set the school record in career minutes played with 4,357, surpassing Louis Bullock, who played 4,356 minutes. Burke had a school record-setting freshman season in assists, ending the year with 156.

== Results ==
Date time, TV	Rank^{#}	Opponent^{#}	Result	Record	High points	High rebounds	High assists	Site (attendance) city, state
Exhibition
April 11, 2011*; 7:00 pm	No. 18	Wayne State	W 47–39	–	20 – Tim Hardaway Jr.	9 – Hardaway	4 – Trey Burke	Crisler Arena (9,259); Ann Arbor, MI
Non-conference Regular Season
November 11, 2011*; 7:00 pm	No. 18	Ferris State	W 59–33	1–0	14 – Evan Smotrycz (1)/ Stu Douglass (1)	6 – Jordan Morgan (1)	4 – Douglass (1)	Crisler Arena (11,029); Ann Arbor, MI
November 14, 2011*; 8:30 pm	No. 17	Towson	W 64–47	2–0	15 – Hardaway (1)	7 – Jon Horford (1)	4 – Douglass (2)	Crisler Arena (7,901); Ann Arbor, MI
November 17, 2011*; 8:30 pm	No. 17	Western Illinois	W 59–55	3–0	16 – Hardaway (2)	5 – Morgan (2)	5 – Burke (1)	Crisler Arena (8,026); Ann Arbor, MI
November 21, 2011*; 3:00 pm, ESPN2	No. 15	vs. No. 8 Memphis; 2011 Maui Invitational	W 73–61	4–0	21 – Hardaway (3)	8 – Smotrycz (1)	5 – Hardaway (1)	Lahaina Civic Center (2,400); Maui, HI
November 22, 2011*; 7:00 pm, ESPN	No. 15	vs. No. 6 Duke; Maui Invitational Semifinals/Duke–Michigan rivalry	L 75–82	4–1	19 – Hardaway (4)	6 – Morgan (3)	9 – Burke (2)	Lahaina Civic Center (2,400); Maui, HI
November 23, 2011*; 7:30 pm, ESPN	No. 15	vs. UCLA; Maui Invitational Third Place	W 79–63	5–1	22 – Zack Novak (1)	8 – Smotrycz (2)	5 – Burke (3)	Lahaina Civic Center (2,400); Maui, HI
November 29, 2011*; 7:00 pm, ESPN2	No. 14	at Virginia; ACC–Big Ten Challenge	L 58–70	5–2	12 – Novak (2)	5 – Smotrycz (3)/Morgan (4)/Douglass (1)	4 – Burke (4)	John Paul Jones Arena (10,564); Charlottesville, VA
December 3, 2011*; 12:00 pm, BTN	No. 14	Iowa State	W 76–66	6–2	19 – Hardaway (5)	11 – Novak (1)	3 – Burke (5)/Hardaway (2)/Smotrycz (1)	Crisler Arena (10,845); Ann Arbor, MI
December 10, 2011*; 4:00 pm, FSDET	No. 20	vs. Oakland	W 90–80	7–2	21 – Hardaway (6)	9 – Smotrycz (4)	9 – Burke (6)	The Palace of Auburn Hills (17,118); Auburn Hills, MI
December 13, 2011*; 7:00 pm, ESPNU	No. 20	Arkansas–Pine Bluff	W 63–50	8–2	16 – Smotrycz (2)	8 – Smotrycz (5)	7 – Burke (7)	Crisler Arena (9,005); Ann Arbor, MI
December 17, 2011*; 12:00 pm, BTN	No. 20	Alabama A&M	W 87–57	9–2	19 – Burke (1)	11 – Smotrycz (6)	4 – Burke (8)/ Hardaway (3)/ Novak (1)	Crisler Arena (10,497); Ann Arbor, MI
December 22, 2011*; 6:30 pm, BTN	No. 20	Bradley	W 77–66	10–2	20 – Smotrycz (3)	10 – Smotrycz (7)	8 – Burke (9)	Crisler Arena (11,298); Ann Arbor, MI
Big Ten Regular Season
December 29, 2011; 7:30 pm, BTN	No. 18	Penn State	W 71–53	11–2 (1–0)	26 – Hardaway (7)	11 – Smotrycz (8)	7 – Burke (10)	Crisler Arena (12,751); Ann Arbor, MI
January 1, 2012; 4:00 pm, BTN	No. 18	Minnesota	W 61–56	12–2 (2–0)	27 – Burke (2)	12 – Morgan (5)	3 – Burke (11)	Crisler Arena (12,721); Ann Arbor, MI
January 5, 2012; 9:00 pm, ESPN2	No. 16	at No. 12 Indiana	L 71–73	12–3 (2–1)	19 – Hardaway (8)	9 – Morgan (6)	8 – Burke (12)	Assembly Hall (16,020); Bloomington, IN
January 8, 2012; 1:30 pm, CBS	No. 16	No. 18 Wisconsin	W 59–41	13–3 (3–1)	17 – Hardaway (9)	11 – Morgan (7)	2 – Burke (13)/Hardaway (4)	Crisler Arena (12,721); Ann Arbor, MI
January 11, 2012; 6:30 pm, BTN	No. 13	Northwestern	W 66–64 ^{OT}	14–3 (4–1)	19 – Hardaway (10)/Burke (3)	8 – Morgan (8)	7 – Burke (14)	Crisler Arena (12,605); Ann Arbor, MI
January 14, 2012; 1:00 pm, BTN	No. 13	at Iowa	L 59–75	14–4 (4–2)	19 – Burke (4)	8 – Novak (2)	2 – Burke (15)/Hardaway (5)/Smotrycz (2)	Carver–Hawkeye Arena (12,366); Iowa City, IA
January 17, 2012; 7:00 pm, ESPN	No. 20	No. 9 Michigan State; Rivalry	W 60–59	15–4 (5–2)	20 – Burke (5)	4 – Trey Burke (1)/Douglass (2)	3 – Burke (16)	Crisler Arena (12,721); Ann Arbor, MI
January 21, 2012*; 2:00 pm, CBS	No. 20	at Arkansas	L 64–66	15–5 (5–2)	17 – Novak (3)	8 – Novak (3)	6 – Burke (17)	Bud Walton Arena (19,050); Fayetteville, AR
January 24, 2012; 7:00 pm, ESPN	No. 20	at Purdue	W 66–64	16–5 (6–2)	19 – Hardaway (11)	8 – Novak (4)	6 – Burke (18)	Mackey Arena (14,533); West Lafayette, IN
January 29, 2012; 1:00 pm, CBS	No. 20	at No. 4 Ohio State	L 49–64	16–6 (6–3)	15 – Hardaway (12)	5 – Morgan (9)/Hardaway (1)	5 – Burke (19)	Value City Arena (18,809); Columbus, OH
February 1, 2012; 6:30 pm, BTN	No. 23	No. 20 Indiana	W 68–56	17–6 (7–3)	18 – Burke (6)	5 – Morgan (10)/Novak (5)	4 – Burke (20)/Douglass (3)	Crisler Arena (12,721); Ann Arbor, MI
February 5, 2012; 1:00 pm, CBS	No. 23	at No. 9 Michigan State; Rivalry	L 54–64	17–7 (7–4)	14 – Novak (4)	4 – Smotrycz (9)	5 – Douglass (4)	Breslin Center (14,797); East Lansing, MI
February 8, 2012; 8:30 pm, BTN	No. 22	at Nebraska	W 62–46	18–7 (8–4)	14 – Novak (5)	6 – Morgan (11)	5 – Burke (21)	Bob Devaney Sports Center (9.533); Lincoln, NE
February 12, 2012; 1:00 pm, CBS	No. 22	Illinois	W 70–61	19–7 (9–4)	15 – Hardaway (13)	9 – Novak (6)	3 – Burke (22)/Hardaway (6)/Novak (2)	Crisler Arena (12,721); Ann Arbor, MI
February 18, 2012; 9:00 pm, ESPN	No. 17	No. 6 Ohio State; ESPN College GameDay	W 56–51	20–7 (10–4)	17 – Burke (7)	11 – Morgan (12)	5 – Burke (23)	Crisler Arena (12,721); Ann Arbor, MI
February 21, 2012; 8:00 pm, BTN	No. 11	at Northwestern	W 67–55 ^{OT}	21–7 (11–4)	19 – Burke (8)	7 – Morgan (13)	5 – Douglass (5)	Welsh-Ryan Arena (8,117); Evanston, IL
February 25, 2012; 6:00 pm, BTN	No. 11	Purdue	L 61–75	21–8 (11–5)	12 – Burke (9)/Novak (6)	6 – Morgan (14)/Novak (7)/Hardaway (2)	5 – Douglass (6)	Crisler Arena (12,721); Ann Arbor, MI
March 1, 2012; 7:00 pm, ESPN	No. 13	at Illinois	W 72–61	22–8 (12–5)	25 – Hardaway (14)	11 – Hardaway (3)	5 – Burke (24)	Assembly Hall (15,244); Champaign, IL
March 4, 2012; 1:00 pm, ESPN	No. 13	at Penn State	W 71–65	23–8 (13–5)	19 – Burke (10)	5 – Morgan (15)	6 – Douglass (7)	Bryce Jordan Center (9,354); University Park, PA
Big Ten tournament
March 9, 2012; 6:30 pm, BTN	No. 10	vs. Minnesota; Quarterfinals	W 73–69 ^{OT}	24–8	30 – Burke (11)	5 – Smotrycz (10)/Hardaway (4)	3 – Burke (25)	Bankers Life Fieldhouse (18,484); Indianapolis, IN
March 10, 2012; 4:10 pm, CBS	No. 10	vs. No. 7 Ohio State; Semifinals	L 55–77	24–9	13 – Hardaway (15)	7 – Burke (2)	4 – Burke (26)	Bankers Life Fieldhouse (18,451); Indianapolis, IN
NCAA tournament
March 16*; 7:20 p.m., TNT	No. 13 (MW 4)	vs. (MW 13) Ohio; Second round	L 60–65	24–10	16 – Burke (12)	7 – Smotrycz (11)	5 – Burke (27)	Bridgestone Arena (14,557); Nashville, TN
*Non-conference game. ^{#}Rankings from AP Poll. (#) Tournament seedings in parentheses. All times are in Eastern Time.

== Statistics ==
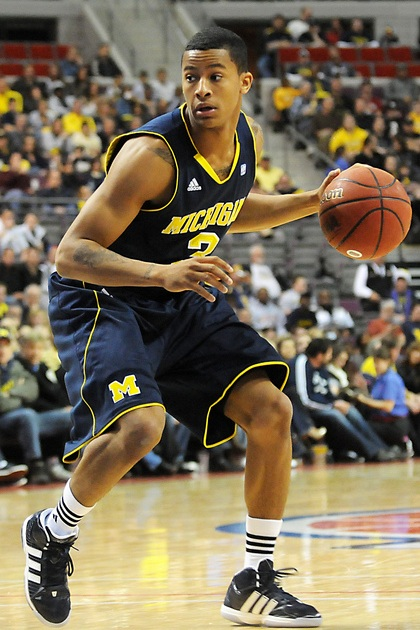
Trey Burke led the team in points, assists, steals and blocks.

The team posted the following statistics:

Name	GP	GS	Min	Avg	FG	FGA	FG%	3FG	3FGA	3FG%	FT	FTA	FT%	OR	DR	RB	Avg	Ast	Avg	PF	DQ	TO	Stl	Blk	Pts	Avg
Trey Burke	34	33	1227	36.1	177	409	0.433	57	164	0.348	93	125	0.744	22	96	118	3.5	156	4.6	53	0	94	31	13	504	14.8
Tim Hardaway Jr.	34	34	1162	34.2	167	400	0.417	53	187	0.283	108	151	0.715	26	104	130	3.8	73	2.1	71	0	66	16	11	495	14.6
Zack Novak	34	34	1145	33.7	110	231	0.476	52	127	0.409	42	49	0.857	42	112	154	4.5	61	1.8	93	4	33	26	3	314	9.2
Evan Smotrycz	34	18	716	21.1	89	185	0.481	40	92	0.435	45	58	0.776	45	120	165	4.8	30	0.9	104	6	46	27	11	263	7.7
Stu Douglass	34	17	1037	30.5	91	224	0.406	48	142	0.338	26	31	0.839	7	80	87	2.6	78	2.3	57	1	34	26	4	256	7.5
Jordan Morgan	33	32	806	24.4	102	165	0.618	0	0		29	59	0.492	72	113	185	5.6	11	0.3	77	0	52	22	9	233	7.1
Matt Vogrich	34	0	365	10.7	29	76	0.382	16	53	0.302	4	6	0.667	10	33	43	1.3	13	0.4	32	0	9	13	2	78	2.3
Blake McLimans	30	0	127	4.2	10	21	0.476	5	12	0.417	0	0		7	14	21	0.7	1	0.0	9	0	5	0	8	25	0.8
Jon Horford	9	1	97	10.8	9	17	0.529	0	0		6	7	0.857	13	19	32	3.6	1	0.1	10	0	5	3	9	24	2.7
Colton Christian	20	0	76	3.8	10	21	0.476	0	0		3	6	0.500	6	6	12	0.6	1	0.1	11	0	5	1	2	23	1.1
Eso Akunne	12	0	48	4.0	7	8	0.875	4	5	0.800	2	2	1.000	0	8	8	0.7	1	0.1	6	0	4	0	0	20	1.7
Corey Person	10	0	11	1.1	5	8	0.625	0	1	0.000	1	1	1.000	3	0	3	0.3	0	0.0	1	0	2	0	0	11	1.1
Carlton Brundidge	15	0	44	2.9	1	8	0.125	0	2	0.000	4	8	0.500	0	8	8	0.5	2	0.1	2	0	5	1	0	6	0.4
Josh Bartelstein	11	0	14	1.3	1	4	0.250	1	3	0.333	0	0		0	1	1	0.1	3	0.3	3	0	1	2	0	3	0.3
TEAM	34													38	42	80	2.4			1		9				
Season Total	34				808	1777	0.455	276	788	0.350	363	503	0.722	291	756	1047	30.8	431	12.7	530	11	370	168	72	2255	66.3
Opponents	34				756	1768	0.428	203	588	0.345	375	526	0.713	329	747	1076	31.6	384	11.3	539		424	189	84	2090	61.5

== Rankings ==
Ranking movements Legend: ██ Increase in ranking ██ Decrease in ranking
	Week																			
Poll	Pre	1	2	3	4	5	6	7	8	9	10	11	12	13	14	15	16	17	18	Final
AP	18	17	15	14	20	20	20	18	16	13	20	20	23	22	17	11	13	10	13	Not released
Coaches'	18	17	15	15	19	18	19	16	13	13	19	22	22	25	19	13	16	13	14	22

== Watchlists and awards ==
=== Preseason ===
	Wooden Top 50	Naismith Top 50
Tim Hardaway Jr. UM	✓	✓

Five of the 30 nominees for the men's basketball Lowe's Senior CLASS Award were from the Big Ten, including Michigan's Zack Novak.

=== In-season ===
	Big Ten Player of the Week			Big Ten Freshman of the Week	
Date	Name	Class	Position	Name	Position
November 28, 2011	Tim Hardaway Jr.	So.	SG	Trey Burke	PG
December 12, 2011				Trey Burke	PG
January 2, 2012	Trey Burke	Fr.	PG	Trey Burke	PG
January 23, 2012				Trey Burke	PG
February 20, 2012				Trey Burke	PG
February 27, 2012				Trey Burke	PG
March 5, 2012				Trey Burke	PG

Trey Burke was one of nearly 60 Bob Cousy Award candidates named in December 2011. On January 4, Burke was one of 20 finalists. On January 25, Novak was named one of ten finalists for the Lowe's Senior CLASS Award along with three other Big Ten athletes. He was also one of four Big Ten men's basketball players named Academic All-District, putting him among the 40 finalists for the 15-man Academic All-America team. Novak was named a third team Academic All-American.

=== Accolades and honors ===
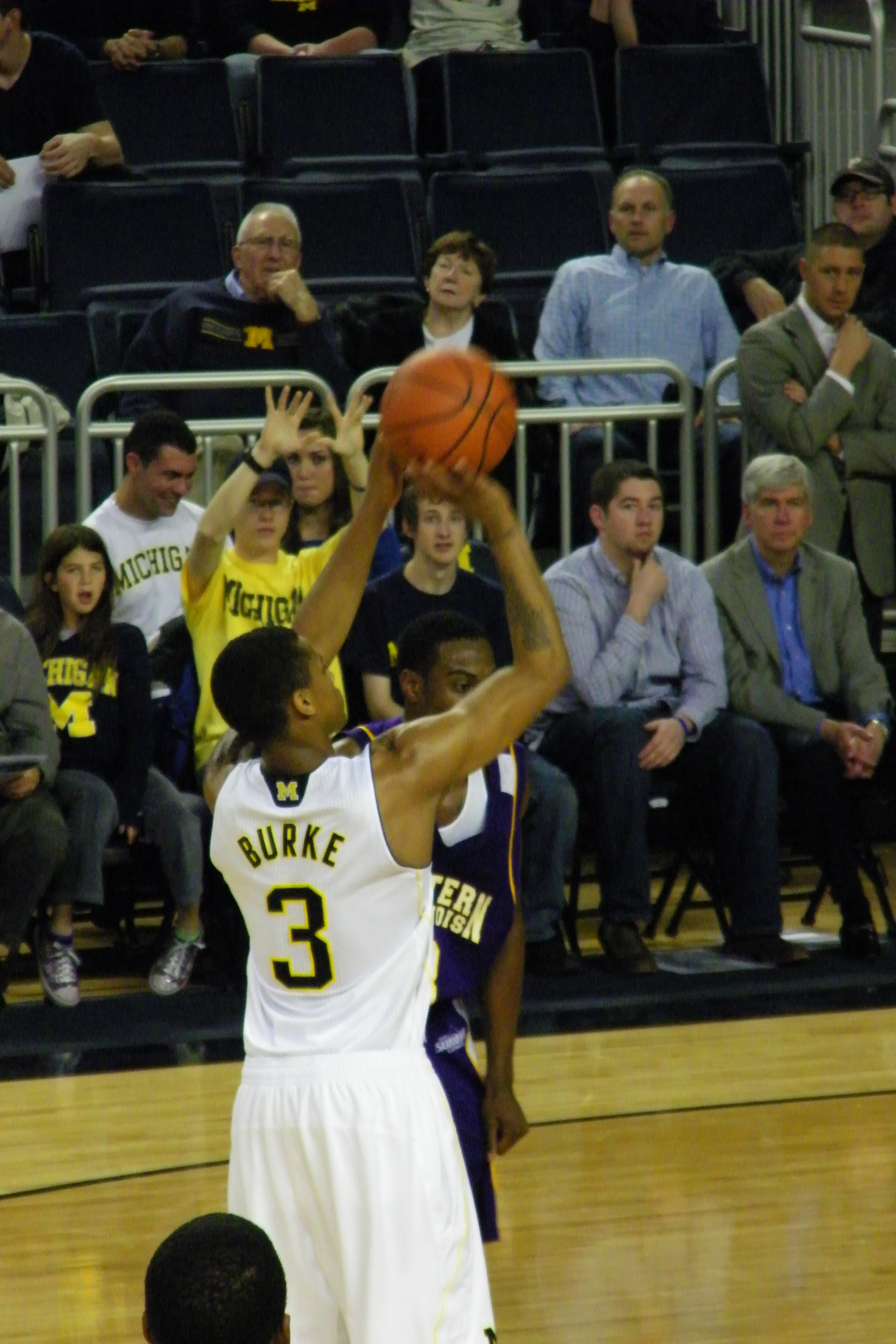
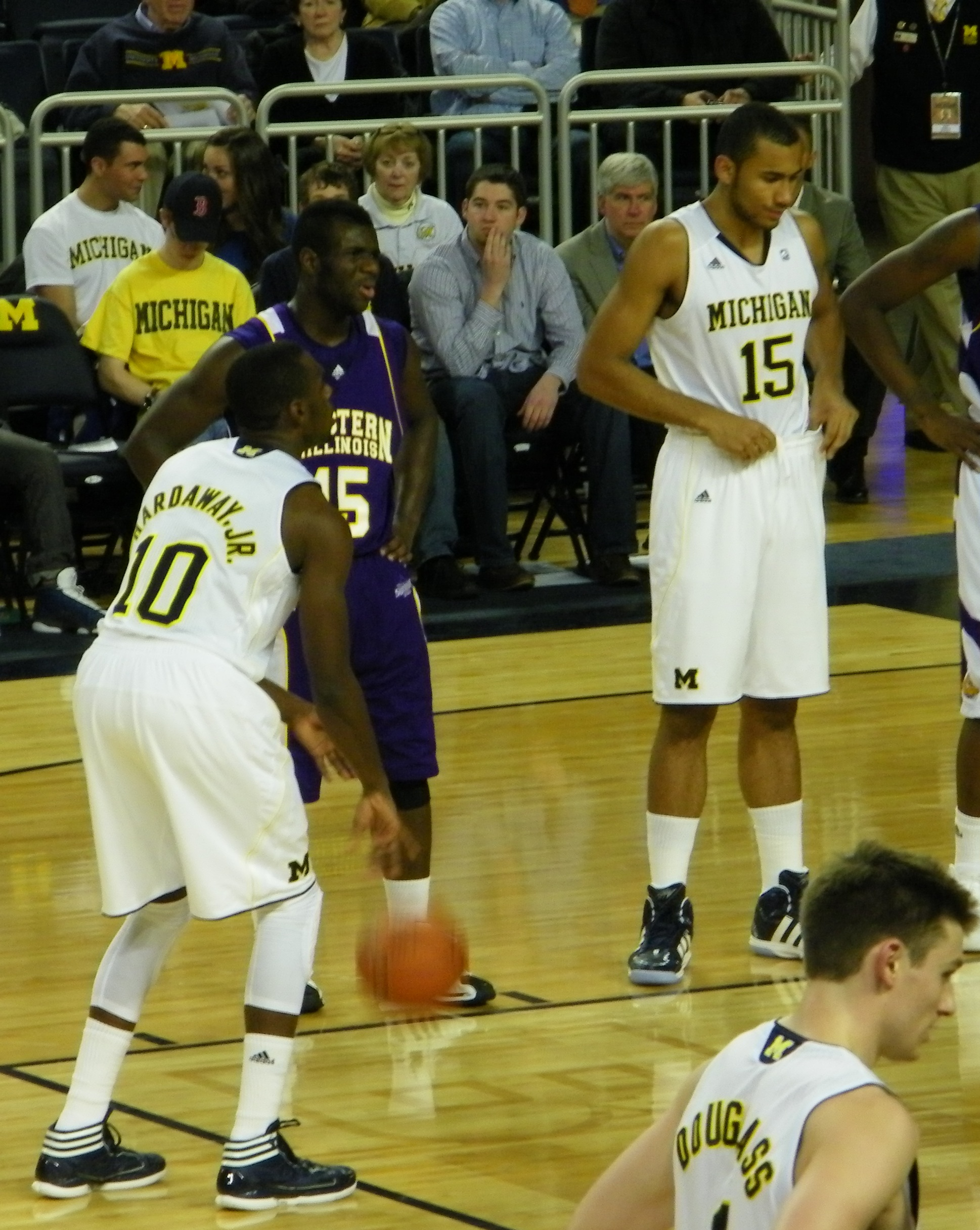
Trey Burke (left) and Tim Hardaway Jr. shooting a free throws for the 2011–12 team on November 17, 2011

Trey Burke

- CBSSports.com Second Team All-American
- Big Ten Freshman of the Year (Big Ten media)
- Co-Big Ten Freshman of the Year (Sporting News)
- All-Big Ten (second team, coaches and media)
- All-Freshman (unanimous)
- USBWA All-District V Team

Tim Hardaway

- All-Big Ten (third team, coaches and media)

Zack Novak

- Academic All-District
- Academic All-American (third team)
- All-Big Ten (honorable mention, media)
- Academic All-Big Ten

Josh Bartelstein

- Academic All-Big Ten

Matt Vogrich

- Academic All-Big Ten

== Roster changes ==
The team lost senior captains Stu Douglass and Zack Novak as well as senior reserve Corey Person to graduation following the season. Person was later granted an extra year of eligibility to return to the team. At the end of the season, three players (Evan Smotrycz, Carlton Brundidge and Colton Christian) decided to leave the program. Smotrycz, who had started in 42 of the 69 games he played in during his first two years, left the program as the program's fifth all-time three-point shooter with a percentage of 40.5. Smotrycz transferred to Maryland, Brundidge transferred to Detroit and Christian transferred to Florida International.

Following the season, Trey Burke first said he was not inclined to enter the 2012 NBA draft. A few days later, however, the realization that the pool of point guards in the 2012 draft was shallow and Burke's stock was high led to some deliberation for him and his family: "When you have a season as a freshman like he did, the NBA, they like them young," Trey's father, Benji Burke said. "They think their ceiling is higher when they're young. Trey had ... a solid season for a freshman. It's going to be one of the weaker point guard drafts in years." Some observers thought Burke was at his peak in terms of NBA potential. Eventually, he decided to return to play for Michigan for another year.

=== 2012–13 team recruits ===
The team announced in September 2010 that Glenn Robinson III, son of former first overall NBA draft pick Glenn Robinson, verbally agreed to attend Michigan, making him the first commitment in the school's class of 2012. Canadian wing guard Nik Stauskas gave Michigan its second verbal commitment for the class of 2012 on March 26, 2011. On November 3, Mitch McGary, who was ranked as the number-two prospect in the nation at the time, announced his verbal commitment to Michigan. Within hours of the commitment, ESPN said that Michigan's ranked as the fifth-best class in the nation. All three signed a National Letter of Intent with the team on November 9. After several other schools announced their commitments, the McGary's commitment moved Michigan from outside the top 25 to the seventh-best class in the nation, according to ESPN. Michael "Spike" Albrecht committed to Michigan on April 6, 2012.

College recruiting information
Name	Hometown	School	Height	Weight	Commit date
Mitch McGary; PF	Chesterton, Indiana	Brewster Academy (NH)	6 ft 10 in (2.08 m)	247.5 lb (112.3 kg)	Mar 11, 2011
Mitch McGary; PF	Recruit ratings: Scout: Rivals: (96)				
Glenn Robinson III; SF	Saint John, Indiana	Lake Central High School	6 ft 5 in (1.96 m)	183.5 lb (83.2 kg)	Sep 14, 2010
Glenn Robinson III; SF	Recruit ratings: Scout: Rivals: (97)				
Nik Stauskas; SF/SG	Mississauga, Ontario	St. Mark's School (MA)	6 ft 5 in (1.96 m)	192.5 lb (87.3 kg)	Mar 26, 2011
Nik Stauskas; SF/SG	Recruit ratings: Scout: Rivals: (92)				
Caris LeVert; SG	Pickerington, Ohio	Pickerington Central High School (OH)	6 ft 4 in (1.93 m)	175 lb (79 kg)	Dec 5, 2012
Caris LeVert; SG	Recruit ratings: Scout: Rivals: (87)				
Spike Albrecht; PG	Crown Point, Indiana	Crown Point High School (IN)/ Northfield Mount Hermon School (MA)	6 ft 1 in (1.85 m)	180 lb (82 kg)	Jun 4, 2012
Spike Albrecht; PG	Recruit ratings: Rivals: (79)				
Overall recruit ranking: Scout: 9 Rivals: 7 ESPN: 14
Note: In many cases, Scout, Rivals, 247Sports, On3, and ESPN may conflict in their listings of height and weight.; In these cases, the average was taken. ESPN grades are on a 100-point scale.; Sources: "Michigan 2012 Basketball Commitments". Rivals.; "2012 Michigan Basketball Commits". Scout.; "ESPN". ESPN.; "Scout.com Team Recruiting Rankings". Scout.; "2012 Team Ranking". Rivals.

== Team Players Drafted into the NBA ==
Year	Round	Pick	Overall	Player	NBA club
2013	1	9	9	Trey Burke	Minnesota Timberwolves
2013	1	24	24	Tim Hardaway Jr.	New York Knicks
