= Stu Douglass =

American-Israeli basketball player

Stu Douglass סטו דאגלס
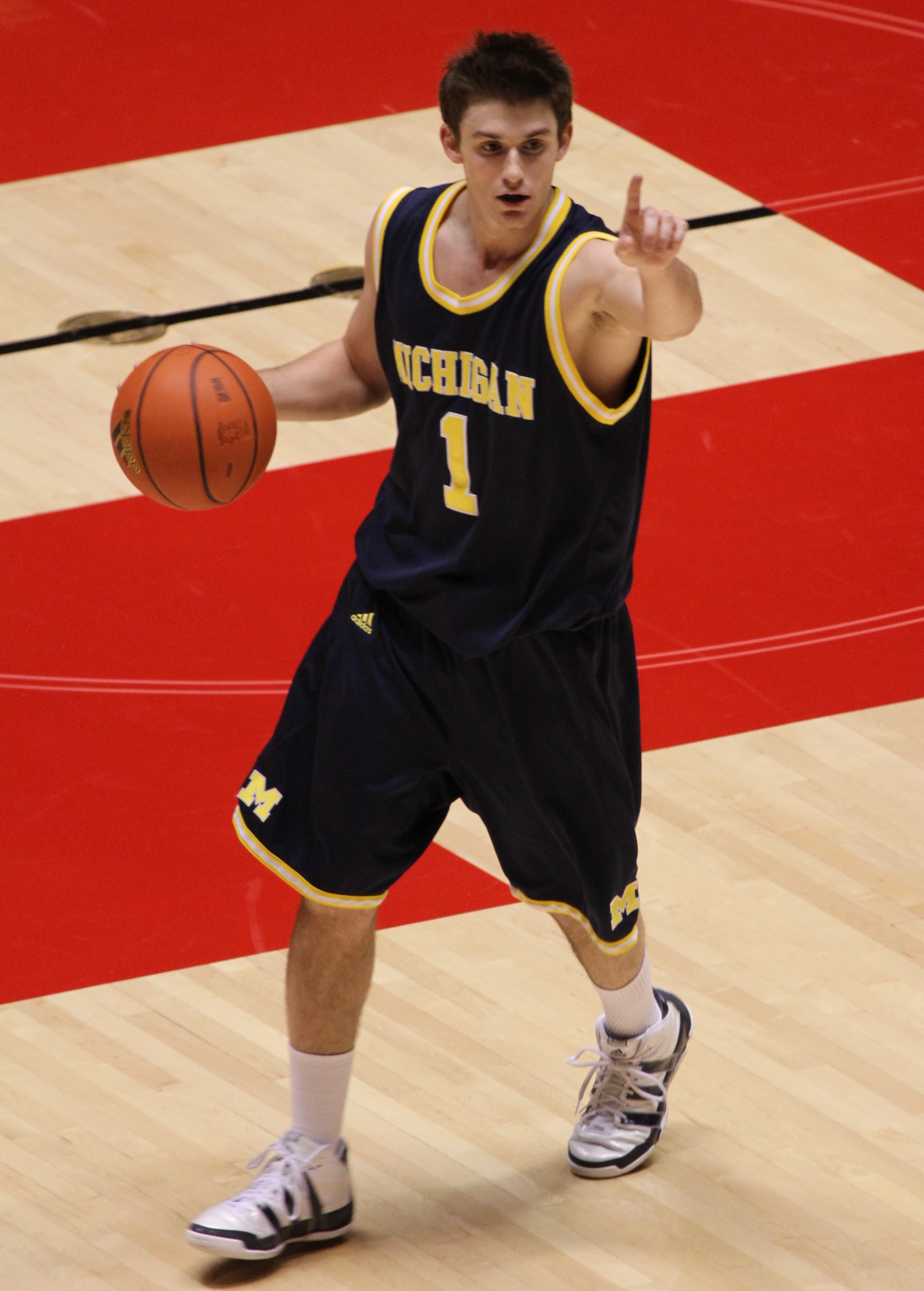
- Douglass with Michigan in 2009

No. 31 – Maccabi Ashdod
- Position: Shooting guard
- League: Israeli Premier League

Personal information
- Born: March 31, 1990 (age 36) Indianapolis, Indiana, U.S.
- Listed height: 6 ft 3 in (1.91 m)
- Listed weight: 200 lb (91 kg)

Career information
- High school: Carmel (Carmel, Indiana)
- College: Michigan (2008–2012)
- NBA draft: 2012: undrafted
- Playing career: 2012–present

Career history
- 2012–2013: Navarra
- 2013–2014: Hapoel Gilboa Galil
- 2014–2015: Hapoel Afula
- 2015–2016: Maccabi Kiryat Gat
- 2016–2018: Ironi Nahariya
- 2018–2019: Hapoel Tel Aviv
- 2019–2020: Maccabi Ashdod
- 2021: Ironi Kiryat Ata B.C.

Stuart Williams Douglass (Hebrew: סטו דאגלס; born March 31, 1990) is an American-Israeli former professional basketball player. He played college basketball at the University of Michigan and spent most of his professional career in Israel. Douglass was known as a three-point specialist.

He was born in Indianapolis, Indiana, and is Jewish.

== College career ==
Douglass played at Carmel High School before going to the University of Michigan where he was a co-captain with Zack Novak in his junior and senior seasons. Douglass played in 136 consecutive games while at Michigan, setting the record for the most games played by a Michigan basketball player. During his career at Michigan, Douglass averaged 28.7 minutes per game and 6.9 points per game while shooting 38% from the field and 34% from three-point range. During his senior season for the 2011–12 Michigan Wolverines, the team earned a share of the 2011–12 Big Ten Conference season regular season championship.

== International career ==
Douglass was part of Team USA as it won a gold medal in the men's basketball team at the 2013 Maccabiah Games in Israel.

== Professional career ==
=== Navarra (2012–2013) ===
On June 29, 2012, Douglass started his professional career with the Spanish team Basket Navarra Club of the LEB Oro. On February 8, 2013, Douglass recorded a career-high 22 points, shooting 7-of-10 from the field, along with three rebounds in a 71–67 win over Cáceres Ciudad del Baloncesto.

=== Hapoel Gilboa Galil (2013–2014) ===
On June 12, 2013, Douglass signed a two-year deal with Israeli team Hapoel Gilboa Galil. On November 24, 2013, Douglass recorded a season-high 18 points, shooting 8-of-13 from the field, along with six assists and two steals in a 63–73 loss to Barak Netanya. Douglass helped Gilboa Galil reach the 2014 Israeli League Quarterfinals, as well as reaching the 2014 Balkan League Finals, where they eventually lost to Levski Sofia.

=== Hapoel Afula (2014–2015) ===
On September 22, 2014, Douglass signed with Hapoel Afula of the Liga Leumit. In 29 games played for Afula, he averaged 14.3 points, 2.9 rebounds, and 3.3 assists, shooting 38 percent from 3-point range.

=== Maccabi Kiryat Gat (2015–2016) ===
On July 6, 2015, Douglass signed a one-year deal with Maccabi Kiryat Gat. In 33 games played during the 2015–16 season, he averaged 7.5 points, 1.9 rebounds, and 1.4 assists, shooting 39 percent from 3-point range.

=== Ironi Nahariya (2016–2018) ===
On June 25, 2016, Douglass signed with Ironi Nahariya for the 2016–17 season. On May 11, 2017, Douglass recorded a season-high 17 points, shooting 5-of-8 from three-point range, along with 3 assists and two steals in an 87–99 loss to Bnei Herzliya. Douglass helped Nahariya reach the 2017 FIBA Europe Cup Quarterfinals, as well as reaching the 2017 Israeli League Quarterfinals, where they eventually lost to Hapoel Jerusalem 2–3 in a playoff series.

On July 25, 2017, Douglass signed a one-year contract extension with Nahariya.

=== Hapoel Tel Aviv (2018–2019) ===
On August 2, 2018, Douglass signed with Hapoel Tel Aviv for the 2018–19 season. On May 27, 2019, Douglass recorded a season-high 16 points, shooting 4-of-5 from three-point range in a 72–85 playoff loss to Maccabi Tel Aviv.

=== Maccabi Ashdod (2019–2020) ===
On July 27, 2019, Douglass signed a one-year deal with Maccabi Ashdod. He was released by Ashdod in June 2020.

=== Ironi Kiryat Ata B.C. (2021) ===
In March 2021 Douglass joined Ironi Kiryat Ata B.C. He played there throughout the 2020/21 season. He announced his retirement in June.

== The Basketball Tournament ==
In June 2018, Douglass joined the Big X, a team composed of former Big Ten players, in The Basketball Tournament 2018.

== Career statistics ==
Legend
GP	Games played	MPG	Minutes per game	FG%	Field goal percentage
3P%	3-point field goal percentage	FT%	Free throw percentage	RPG	Rebounds per game
APG	Assists per game	SPG	Steals per game	BPG	Blocks per game
PPG	Points per game	**Bold**	Career high		Led the league

=== College ===
Year	Team	GP	GS	MPG	FG%	3P%	FT%	RPG	APG	SPG	BPG	PPG
2008–09	Michigan	**35**	**23**	22.7	.368	.335	.679	1.4	2.1	.7	.1	6.0
2009–10	Michigan	32	**23**	**31.4**	.333	.329	.778	2.1	**2.4**	**1.0**	.0	6.7
2010–11	Michigan	**35**	12	30.4	**.408**	**.358**	.231	**2.9**	1.6	.6	**.2**	7.1
2011–12	Michigan	34	18	30.4	.406	.338	**.839**	2.5	2.2	.7	.1	**7.5**
Career		136	76	28.7	.380	.340	.697	2.2	2.1	.8	.1	6.8

Source: RealGM

== See also ==
- List of select Jewish basketball players
