= Bacari Alexander =

American basketball coach

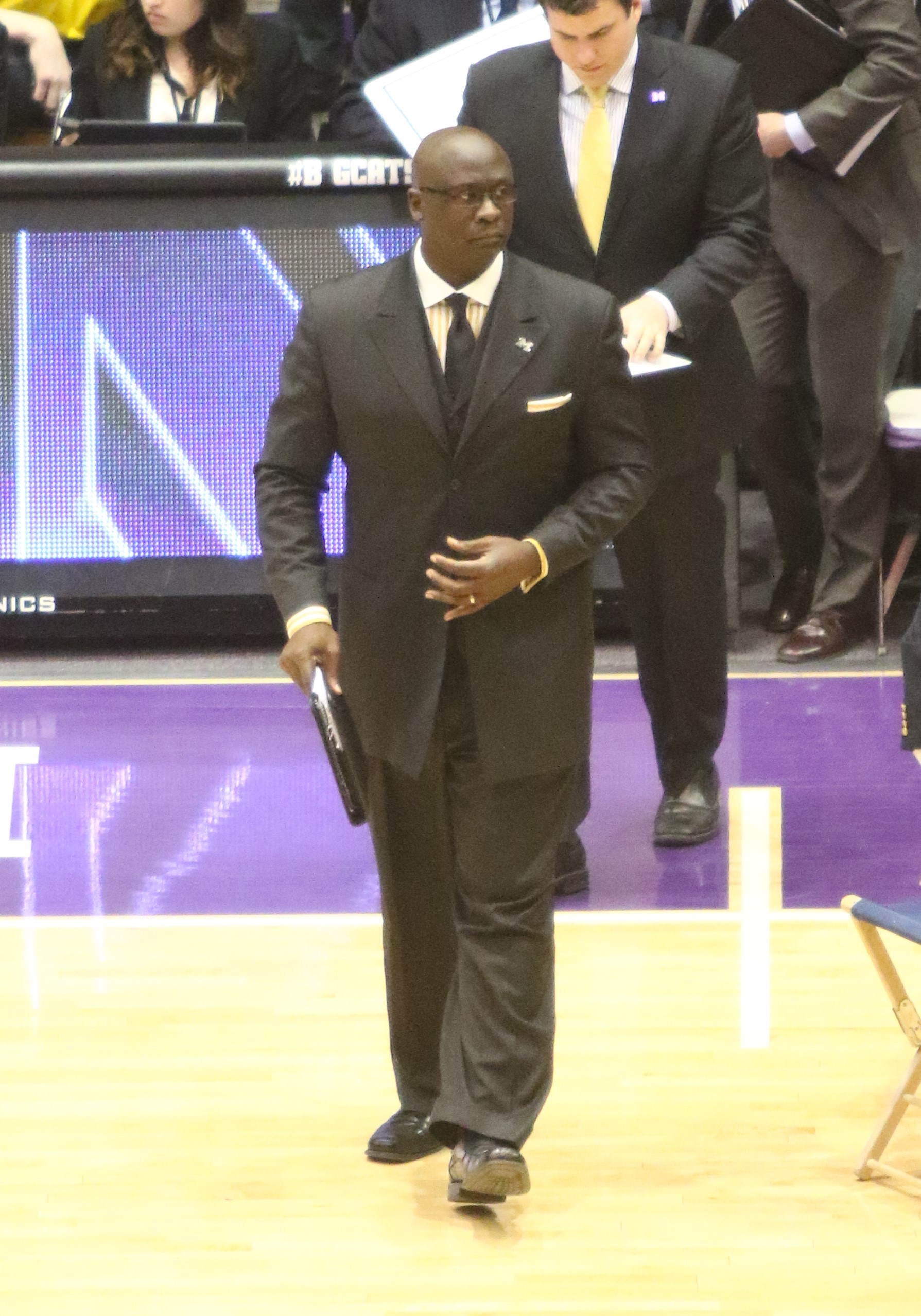
- Alexander in 2015

Biographical details
- Born: September 15, 1976 (age 50); Detroit, Michigan, U.S.

Playing career
- 1994–1996: Robert Morris
- 1997–1999: Detroit

Coaching career (HC unless noted)
- 2001–2007: Detroit (asst.)
- 2008–2008: Ohio (asst.)
- 2008–2010: Western Michigan (asst.)
- 2010–2016: Michigan (asst.)
- 2016–2018: Detroit
- 2019–2021: Denver (asst.)

Head coaching record
- Overall: 16–47 (.254)

Bacari Torrell Alexander (born September 15, 1976) is an American college basketball coach, formerly the men's basketball head coach at Detroit Mercy. He is a former assistant coach at Michigan, Western Michigan, Ohio, and Detroit Mercy. At Michigan, Alexander was responsible for coaching the team's post players, developing defensive strategies, scouting opponents and on-court coaching. In six seasons as an assistant coach under Michigan head coach John Beilein, Michigan advanced to the NCAA tournament each year, won Big Ten Conference regular season championships in 2012 and 2014 and appeared in the Elite 8 in 2014 and the National Championship in 2013.

== Playing career ==
Alexander was born in Detroit, Michigan and played high school basketball at Detroit Southwestern High School. He starred in two seasons of college basketball at Robert Morris University in Pittsburgh an earned NEC All-Newcomer honors in his freshman campaign (1994–95 season) before transferring to Detroit Mercy. In two seasons with the Detroit, Alexander appeared in 62 games and, along with teammate and fellow co-captain Jermaine Jackson, helped lead the Titans to back-to-back NCAA tournament berths in 1998 and 1999. He was known as "the enforcer" on the Titans' 1999 team.

From 1999 to 2001, Alexander played with the Harlem Globetrotters, participating in over 300 plus shows in 13 countries. He also directed camps for the Globetrotters and served as an "Advance Ambassador" for the team marketing and promotions. Alexander described his time with the Globetrotters as "the toughest job in professional ... anything. You travel to a different city every day and twice on Sunday. I played near 10 NBA regular seasons in two seasons with the Globetrotters."

== Coaching career ==
In 2001, Alexander began his coaching career as an assistant coach to Perry Watson at Detroit Mercy. He has held assistant coaching positions at Detroit (2001–2007), Ohio with Tim Oshea (2007–08), and Steve Hawkins at Western Michigan(2008–2010). Alexander also developed a reputation as an intense coach and sharp dresser and was recognized by CollegeInsider.com's Runway to the Fashionable Four as the most fashionable assistant coach in the United States in 2005, 2007, 2009, and 2010. He was also the runner-up in 2008. No other coach has won the award four times.

=== Assistant at Michigan ===
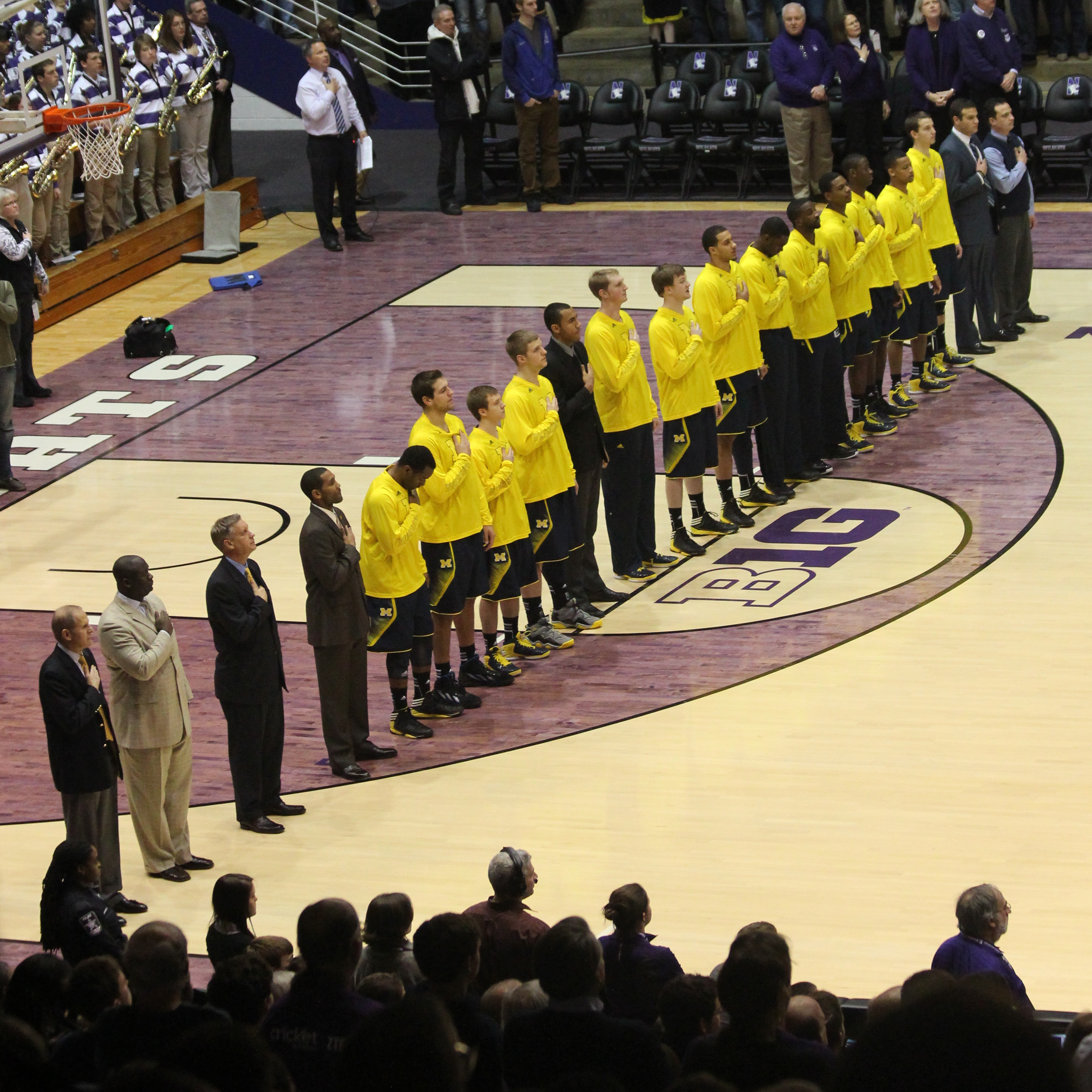
Alexander (2nd from left) with the national runner-up 2012–13 Michigan Wolverines

In April 2010, Alexander was hired as an assistant coach at the University of Michigan. At the time, Alexander told reporters, "You know, in short, it's a dream job. I can't put it any better than that. If you grow up in the state of Michigan ... the University of Michigan is a global entity. To be fortunate enough to get this opportunity is a blessing."

At Michigan, Alexander has been responsible for coaching the team's post players, developing defensive strategies, scouting opponents and on-court coaching. In Alexander's four seasons as an assistant coach at Michigan, the Wolverines have advanced each year to the NCAA tournament, won a Big Ten Conference regular season championship in 2012 and 2014, and advanced to the Final Four as the National Finalist in 2013 and Elite 8 2014.

Alexander's creative and inspiring pregame speeches, often involving props, were credited with keeping the team loose and ready to compete. Before a game against Michigan State, Alexander wore a construction hat and safety goggles while urging the group to "go to work". Before the team's Sweet Sixteen game against Kansas, he placed a picture of a Jayhawk (Kansas' mascot) in a birdcage and told the team "The JayHawk needed to be caged". Before Michigan's Elite Eight victory over Florida, Alexander sent one of the team's student managers, James Peretzman, to purchase a can of Pringles potato chips and then placed a Pringle on the shoulder of each Michigan starter and inspired the team to "play with a chip on its shoulder". On April 6, 2013, Alexander was profiled in The New York Times as "a showman often ranked among college basketball's most fashionable assistants" and "a recruiter who can regale elite young players with tales from his two seasons with the Globetrotters."

=== Head coach of Detroit Mercy ===
On April 21, 2016 Detroit Mercy announced Alexander as the new head coach of the men's basketball team, replacing Ray McCallum.

On March 26, 2018, after 47 combined losses in 2 seasons, Detroit fired Alexander.

== Head coaching record ==
Record table
Season	Team	Overall	Conference	Standing	Postseason
Detroit Titans (Horizon League) (2016–2018)
2016–17	Detroit	8–23	6–12	7th	
2017–18	Detroit	8–24	4–14	10th	
Detroit:		16–47 (.254)	10–26 (.278)		
Total:		16–47 (.254)			
National champion Postseason invitational champion Conference regular season champion Conference regular season and conference tournament champion Division regular season champion Division regular season and conference tournament champion Conference tournament champion
