= Evan Smotrycz =

American basketball player

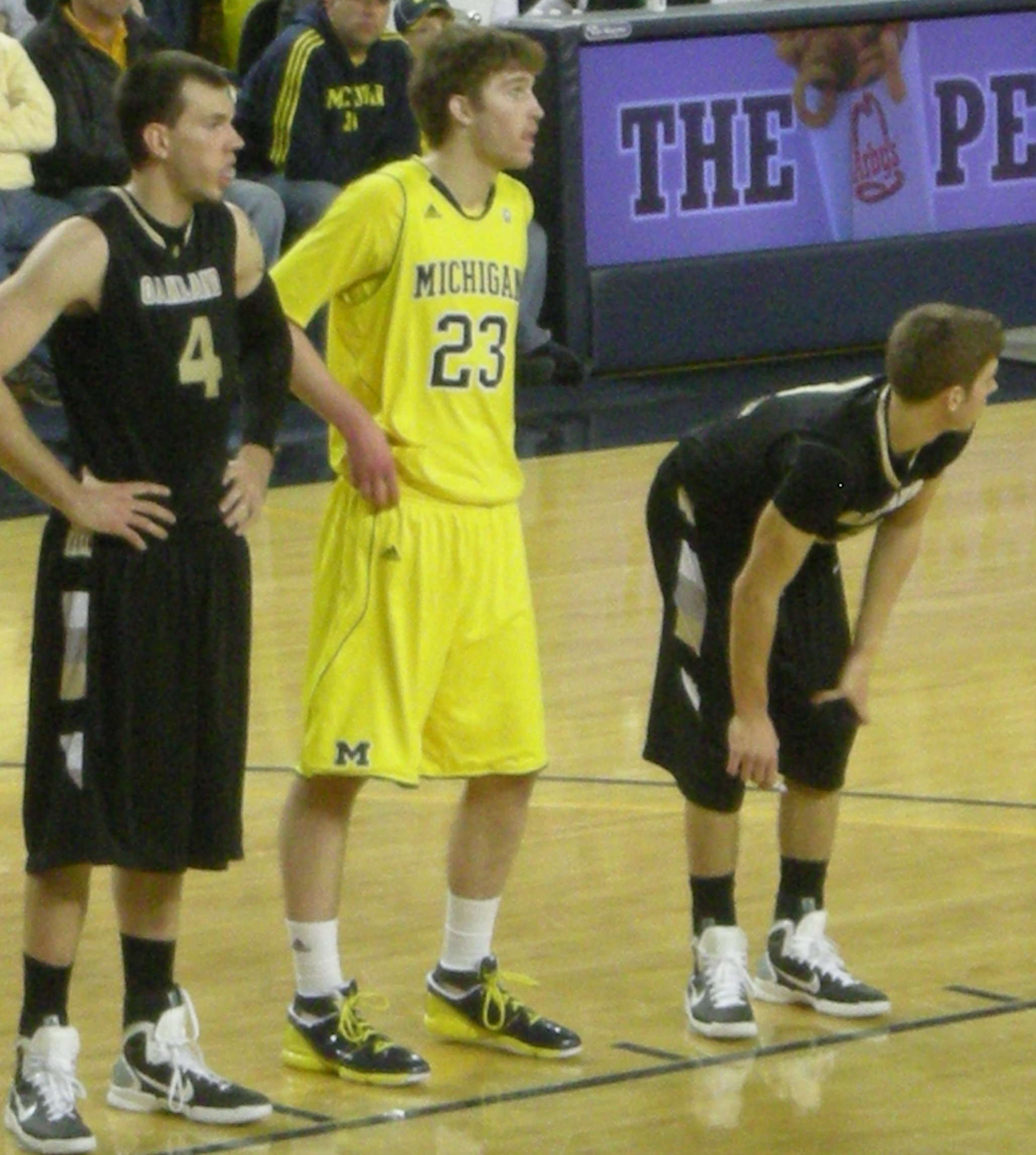
- Smotrycz (23) playing for Michigan

Free agent
- Position: Small forward

Personal information
- Born: August 2, 1991 (age 35) Stoneham, Massachusetts
- Listed height: 6 ft 9 in (2.06 m)
- Listed weight: 234 lb (106 kg)

Career information
- High school: Reading Memorial (Reading, Massachusetts); New Hampton (New Hampton, New Hampshire)
- College: Michigan (2010–2012); Maryland (2013–2015)
- NBA draft: 2015: undrafted
- Playing career: 2015–present

Career history
- 2015–2016: Keravnos B.C.
- 2016–2017: Eisbären Bremerhaven
- 2017–2018: BG Göttingen
- 2018: Ferro Carril Oeste
- 2018–2019: Iowa Wolves

Evan Michael Smotrycz (born August 2, 1991) is an American basketball player. He played college basketball for Michigan and Maryland. Married TV News-reporter Olivia DiVenti in November 2024.

== High school career ==
Smotrycz began his high school career with Reading Memorial High School in Massachusetts where he won the MVP award at a session of the Eastern Invitational Basketball Camp. He transferred to the New Hampton School and repeated his junior year to reclassify to the class of 2010. He averaged 14 points and 8 rebounds for a team that just missed out on making the playoffs. However, he began to receive heavy recruiting interest.

College recruiting
| Name | Hometown | School | Height | Weight | Commit date |
|---|---|---|---|---|---|
| Evan Smotrycz; SF | Reading, Massachusetts | New Hampton School (New Hampshire) | 6 ft 9 in (2.06 m) | 225 lb (102 kg) | Sep 4, 2009 |
| Evan Smotrycz; SF | Recruit ratings: Scout: Rivals: (94) | | | | |
Overall recruit ranking: ESPN: 14
Note: In many cases, Scout, Rivals, 247Sports, On3, and ESPN may conflict in their listings of height and weight.; In these cases, the average was taken. ESPN grades are on a 100-point scale.; Sources: "Michigan 2010 Basketball Commitments". Rivals.; "2010 Michigan Basketball Commits". Scout.; "ESPN". ESPN.; "Scout.com Team Recruiting Rankings". Scout.; "2010 Team Ranking". Rivals.

== College career ==
Smotrycz began his college career at Michigan. As a freshman, he posted 6.3 points per game, shooting 38 percent from behind the arc. In the final two non-conference games of his sophomore season, Smotrycz scored his first two double-doubles against Alabama A&M and Bradley on December 17 and 22. On December 29, Michigan won its first Big Ten Conference opener since 2006–07, beating Penn State as Smotrycz extended his double-double streak to three games. As a sophomore, he averaged 7.7 points and 4.9 rebounds per game. After the season, he opted to transfer, citing the need for a better fit. Smotrycz ultimately chose Maryland over offers from Colorado and Providence because he felt comfortable with the coaches and players. Smotrcycz 9–11 (81.8%) career three-point shot percentage in the NCAA Tournament is a Michigan school record (min 10 attempts).

He averaged 11 points and six rebounds in 28 minutes a game as a junior. Coming into his senior season, Smotrycz dealt with a broken foot in the preseason, followed by a sprained knee and later sidelined with a hairline fracture of the thumb on his shooting hand. As a result, his numbers declined to 4.7 points and 4.1 rebounds in 19 minutes per game.

== Professional career ==
After not being selected in the 2015 NBA draft, he signed his first professional contract in July with Keravnos B.C. of the First Division of Cyprus. In his rookie season Smotrycz averaged 15.4 points, 7.2 rebounds and 2.3 assists per game. The following year he played in the NBA Summer League for the Toronto Raptors. On July 26, 2016, he signed with Eisbaren Bremerhaven of the Basketball Bundesliga, but after eleven games, an injury temporarily separated him from the team. In July 2017, Smotrycz inked with BG Göttingen. On February 20, 2018, after leaving Germany, he landed in Argentina where he replaced Dijon Thompson at the Club Ferro Carril Oeste. On November 2, 2018, Smotrycz was added to the Iowa Wolves opening night roster.
