= Zack Novak =

American basketball player (born 1990)

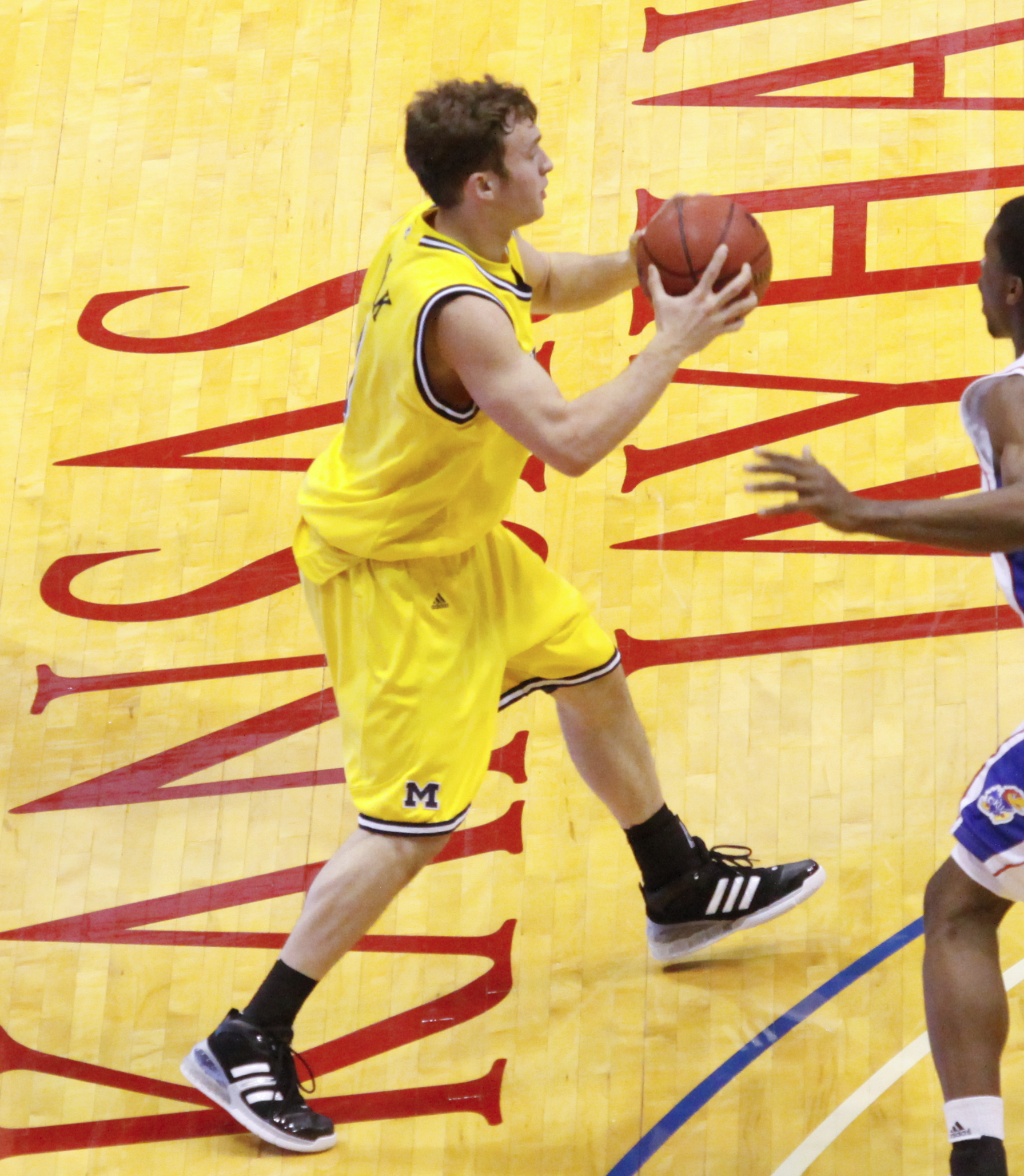
- Novak with the Michigan Wolverines in 2009

Personal information
- Born: May 17, 1990 (age 36) Hammond, Indiana
- Listed height: 6 ft 4 in (1.93 m)
- Listed weight: 210 lb (95 kg)

Career information
- High school: Chesterton (Chesterton, Indiana)
- College: Michigan (2008–2012)
- NBA draft: 2012: undrafted
- Playing career: 2012–2013
- Position: Shooting guard

Career history
- 2012–2013: Landstede

Career highlights
- All-DBL Team (2013); DBL All-Star (2013); Third team Academic All-American (2012); Senior All-American (2012)

Zachariah Joseph Novak (born May 27, 1990) is an American former professional basketball player. He played four years of college basketball for Michigan before playing one season of professional basketball in the Netherlands.

== Professional career ==
During his senior season for the 2011–12 Michigan Wolverines, the team earned a share of the 2011–12 Big Ten Conference season regular season championship. On July 23, 2012, Novak signed with Dutch team Landstede Basketbal for the 2012–13 season. He helped Landstede reach the final of the Dutch Cup and earned DBL All-Star honors and All-DBL Team recognition. In 38 games, he averaged 17.8 points, 4.8 rebounds, 1.6 assists and 1.4 steals per game.

Novak was a District four first-team 2009-2010 Academic All-District Men's Basketball Team selection, making him one of the 40 finalists for the 15-man Academic All-American team. Novak was a 2011 third team Academic All-American. He was among the 10 finalists for the Lowe's Senior CLASS Award. He was an honorable mention All-Big Ten selection by the media.

== Post-playing career ==
In December 2013, Novak moved to Chicago, where he caught on with a predictive analytics software company, Uptake. He also runs the Zack Novak Dexter Shooting Academy.
