= 2010–11 Penn State Nittany Lions basketball team =

American college basketball season

2010–11 Penn State Nittany Lions men's basketball

NCAA tournament, Round of 64
- Conference: Big Ten Conference
- Record: 19–15 (9–9 Big Ten)
- Head coach: Ed DeChellis
- Assistant coaches: Kurt Kanaskie; Lewis Preston; Dan Earl
- Home arena: Bryce Jordan Center

2010–11 Big Ten Conference men's basketball standings
	Conf.				Overall
Team	W		L	PCT	W		L	PCT
No. 1 Ohio State †	16	–	2	.889	34	–	3	.919
No. 13 Purdue	14	–	4	.778	26	–	8	.765
No. 16 Wisconsin	13	–	5	.722	25	–	9	.735
Michigan	9	–	9	.500	21	–	14	.600
Illinois	9	–	9	.500	20	–	14	.588
Penn State	9	–	9	.500	19	–	15	.559
Michigan State	9	–	9	.500	19	–	15	.559
Northwestern	7	–	11	.389	20	–	14	.588
Minnesota	6	–	12	.333	17	–	14	.548
Iowa	4	–	14	.222	11	–	20	.355
Indiana	3	–	15	.167	12	–	20	.375
† 2011 Big Ten tournament winner Rankings from AP poll

The 2010–11 Penn State Nittany Lions basketball team represented Pennsylvania State University. Head Coach Ed DeChellis was in his eighth season with the team. The team played its home games in University Park, Pennsylvania, at the Bryce Jordan Center, which has a capacity of 15,000, for the twelfth consecutive season. They finished with a record of 19–15 overall, 9–9 in Big Ten play to finish in a four-way tie for fourth place. They lost in the championship game to Ohio State in the 2011 Big Ten Conference men's basketball tournament. They received an at-large bid to the 2011 NCAA Division I men's basketball tournament, which was their first appearance since 2001. They lost in the first round to Temple on a last-second buzzer beater.

== Current coaching staff ==
Position	Name	Year	Alma mater
Head coach	Ed DeChellis	2003	Penn State (1982)
Assistant coach	Kurt Kanaskie	2003	La Salle (1980)
Assistant coach	Lewis Preston	2008	VMI (1993)
Assistant coach	Dan Earl	2005	Penn State (1997)
Director of basketball operations	Ernie Nestor	2010	Alderson Broaddus University (1968)
Athletic trainer	Jon Salazer	2001	Penn State (1993)
Video coordinator	DJ Black	2008	Penn State (2006)
Strength and conditioning coach	Brad Pantall	2006	Penn State (1996)
Graduate manager	Kyle Gifford	2010	Penn State (2009)

== Roster ==
Name	#	Position	Height	Weight	Year	Home town
Taran Buie	2	Guard	6–2	185	Freshman	State College, PA
Jermaine Marshall	3	Guard	6–4	190	RS freshman	Etters, PA
Tre Bowman	10	Guard	6–4	185	Freshman	York, PA
Alan Wisniewski	11	Forward	6–9	205	Freshman	Sterling Heights, MI
Talor Battle	12	Guard	6–0	170	Senior	Albany, NY
David Jackson	15	Forward	6–7	210	RS senior	Farrell, PA
Nick Colella	20	Guard	6–3	195	Junior	New Castle, PA
Sasa Borovnjak	21	Forward	6–9	235	Sophomore	Belgrade, Serbia
Andrew Jones	22	Forward	6–10	245	RS senior	Philadelphia, PA
Tim Frazier	23	Guard	6–1	160	Sophomore	Houston, TX
Cammeron Woodyard	24	Guard	6–5	210	Junior	Westminster, MD
Jeff Brooks	25	Forward	6–8	200	Senior	Louisville, KY
Jonathan Graham	34	Forward	6–8	218	Freshman	Baltimore, MD
Billy Oliver	35	Forward	6–8	215	RS freshman	Chatham, NJ
Steve Kirkpatrick	41	Forward	6–5	225	Senior	Carlisle, PA

== Schedule and results ==
Date time, TV	Rank^{#}	Opponent^{#}	Result	Record	Site (attendance) city, state
Exhibition
Nov 7*; 2:30 p.m.		East Stroudsburg	W 62–52	—	Bryce Jordan Center (2,887); University Park, PA
Regular season
Nov 12*; 7:30 p.m.		Lehigh	W 70–56	1–0	Bryce Jordan Center (5,996); University Park, PA
Nov 16*; 7:30 p.m.		Saint Joseph's	W 66–57	2–0	Bryce Jordan Center (5,846); University Park, PA
Nov 19*; 7:30 p.m., BTN		Fairfield	W 69–49	3–0	Bryce Jordan Center (4,177); University Park, PA
Nov 22*; 7:00 p.m., BTN		Central Connecticut	W 77–61	4–0	Bryce Jordan Center (4,196); University Park, PA
Nov 26*; 7:00 p.m.		at Ole Miss	L 71–84	4–1	Tad Smith Coliseum (6,564); Oxford, MS
Nov 28*; 3:30 p.m., BTN		Furman	W 70–49	5–1	Bryce Jordan Center (5,181); University Park, PA
Dec 1*; 9:15 p.m., ESPN2		Maryland; ACC–Big Ten Challenge	L 39–62	5–2	Bryce Jordan Center (9,078); University Park, PA
Dec 4*; 6:00 p.m., BTN		Duquesne	W 77–73	6–2	Bryce Jordan Center (5,853); University Park, PA
Dec 7*; 7:30 p.m.		Mount St. Mary's	W 57–53	7–2	Bryce Jordan Center (5,154); University Park, PA
Dec 12*; 1:00 p.m., CSN		at Virginia Tech	L 69–79	7–3	Cassell Coliseum (9,847); Blacksburg, VA
Dec 21*; 5:00 p.m.		Maine	L 64–74	7–4	Bryce Jordan Center (4,174); University Park, PA
Dec 27; 6:30 p.m., BTN		at Indiana	W 69–60	8–4 (1–0)	Assembly Hall (14,952); Bloomington, IN
Jan 2; 4:00 p.m., BTN		at Michigan	L 69–76	8–5 (1–1)	Crisler Arena (11,771); Ann Arbor, MI
Jan 5; 6:30 p.m., BTN		No. 11 Purdue	L 68–83	8–6 (1–2)	Bryce Jordan Center (5,342); University Park, PA
Jan 8; 1:00 p.m., BTN		No. 18 Michigan State	W 66–62	9–6 (2–2)	Bryce Jordan Center (8,564); University Park, PA
Jan 11; 9:00 p.m., BTN		No. 16 Illinois	W 57–55	10–6 (3–2)	Bryce Jordan Center (6,353); University Park, PA
Jan 15; 5:30 p.m., BTN		at No. 1 Ohio State	L 66–69	10–7 (3–3)	Jerome Schottenstein Center (18,809); Columbus, OH
Jan 19; 8:30 p.m., BTN		at No. 14 Purdue	L 62–63	10–8 (3–4)	Mackey Arena (14,123); West Lafayette, IN
Jan 26; 6:30 p.m., BTN		Iowa	W 65–51	11–8 (4–4)	Bryce Jordan Center (6,625); University Park, PA
Jan 29; 4:00 p.m., BTN		No. 15 Wisconsin	W 56–52	12–8 (5–4)	Bryce Jordan Center (14,292); University Park, PA
Feb 1; 9:00 p.m., BTN		at Illinois	L 51–68	12–9 (5–5)	Assembly Hall (14,996); Champaign, IL
Feb 6; 12:00 p.m., BTN		Michigan	L 62–65	12–10 (5–6)	Bryce Jordan Center (8,302); University Park, PA
Feb 10; 7:00 p.m., BTN		at Michigan State	L 57–75	12–11 (5–7)	Breslin Center (14,797); East Lansing, MI
Feb 13; 3:30 p.m., BTN		Northwestern	W 65–41	13–11 (6–7)	Bryce Jordan Center (11,239); University Park, PA
Feb 17; 7:00 p.m., ESPN		Minnesota	W 66–63	14–11 (7–7)	Bryce Jordan Center (8,446); University Park, PA
Feb 20; 6:00 p.m., BTN		at No. 10 Wisconsin	L 66–76	14–12 (7–8)	Kohl Center (17,230); Madison, WI
Feb 24; 9:00 p.m., ESPN2		at Northwestern	W 66–52	15–12 (8–8)	Welsh-Ryan Arena (4,918); Evanston, IL
Mar 1; 9:00 p.m., BTN		No. 1 Ohio State	L 61–82	15–13 (8–9)	Bryce Jordan Center (15,403); University Park, PA
Mar 6; 1:00 p.m., BTN		at Minnesota	W 66–63	16–13 (9–9)	Williams Arena (14,625); Minneapolis, MN
Big Ten tournament
Mar 10; 7:30 p.m., BTN	(6)	vs. (11) Indiana; Big Ten First Round	W 61–55	17–13	Conseco Fieldhouse (16,264); Indianapolis, IN
Mar 11; 9:00 p.m., BTN	(6)	vs. (3) No. 13 Wisconsin; Big Ten Quarterfinals	W 36–33	18–13	Conseco Fieldhouse (18,381); Indianapolis, IN
Mar 12; 4:00 p.m., CBS	(6)	vs. (7) Michigan State; Big Ten Semifinals	W 61–48	19–13	Conseco Fieldhouse (18,377); Indianapolis, IN
Mar 13; 3:30 p.m., CBS	(6)	vs. (1) No. 1 Ohio State; Big Ten Championship game	L 60–71	19–14	Conseco Fieldhouse (15,770); Indianapolis, IN
NCAA tournament
Mar 17*; 2:10 p.m., TNT	(10 W)	vs. (7 W) Temple; NCAA Second round	L 64–66	19–15	McKale Center; Tucson, AZ
*Non-conference game. ^{#}Rankings from AP Poll. (#) Tournament seedings in parentheses. W=NCAA West Regional.
