= 2011 Big Ten men's basketball tournament =

- Classification: Division I
- Season: 2010–11
- Teams: 11
- Site: Conseco Fieldhouse; Indianapolis, Indiana
- Champions: Ohio State (3rd title)
- Winning coach: Thad Matta (3rd title)
- MVP: Jared Sullinger (Ohio State)
- Top scorer: Talor Battle (70 points)
- Television: BTN, ESPN, ESPN2, and CBS

2010–11 Big Ten Conference men's basketball standings
	Conf.				Overall
Team	W		L	PCT	W		L	PCT
No. 1 Ohio State †	16	–	2	.889	34	–	3	.919
No. 13 Purdue	14	–	4	.778	26	–	8	.765
No. 16 Wisconsin	13	–	5	.722	25	–	9	.735
Michigan	9	–	9	.500	21	–	14	.600
Illinois	9	–	9	.500	20	–	14	.588
Penn State	9	–	9	.500	19	–	15	.559
Michigan State	9	–	9	.500	19	–	15	.559
Northwestern	7	–	11	.389	20	–	14	.588
Minnesota	6	–	12	.333	17	–	14	.548
Iowa	4	–	14	.222	11	–	20	.355
Indiana	3	–	15	.167	12	–	20	.375
† 2011 Big Ten tournament winner Rankings from AP poll

The 2011 Big Ten men's basketball tournament was held from March 10 through March 13, 2011 at Conseco Fieldhouse in Indianapolis, Indiana. It was the fourteenth annual Big Ten men's basketball tournament. The championship was won by Ohio State who defeated Penn State in the championship game. As a result, Ohio State received the Big Ten's automatic bid to the NCAA tournament. The win marked Ohio State's third tournament championship and second consecutive (one championship has been vacated).

== Seeds ==
All Big Ten schools played in the tournament. Teams were seeded by conference record, with a tiebreaker system used to seed teams with identical conference records. Seeding for the tournament was determined at the close of the regular conference season. The top five teams received a first round bye.

Seed	School	Conf	1st tiebreak	2nd tiebreak	3rd tiebreak	4th tiebreak	5th tiebreak	6th tiebreak	7th tiebreak
1	Ohio State	16–2							
2	Purdue	14–4							
3	Wisconsin	13–5							
4	Michigan	9–9	4–1 vs Ill, PSU, MSU						
5	Illinois	9–9	3–2 vs Mich, PSU, MSU						
6	Penn State	9–9	2–4 vs Mich, Ill, MSU	0–2 vs OSU	0–2 vs Pur	1–1 vs Wis	2–0 vs NW	2–0 vs Minn	1–0 vs Iowa
7	Michigan State	9–9	2–4 vs Mich, Ill, PSU	0–1 vs OSU	0–2 vs Pur	1–1 vs Wis	2–0 vs NW	2–0 vs Minn	1–1 vs Iowa
8	Northwestern	7–11							
9	Minnesota	6–12							
10	Iowa	4–14							
11	Indiana	3–15							

== Schedule ==
Session	Game	Time*	Matchup^{#}	Television	Score
First round - Thursday, March 10
1	1	2:30pm	#9 Minnesota vs. #8 Northwestern	ESPN2	65–75
1	2	5:00pm	#10 Iowa vs. #7 Michigan State	ESPN2	61–66
1	3	7:30pm	#11 Indiana vs. #6 Penn State	BTN	55–61
Quarterfinals - Friday, March 11
2	4	12:00pm	#8 Northwestern vs. #1 Ohio State	ESPN	61–67 OT
2	5	2:30pm	#5 Illinois vs. #4 Michigan	ESPN	55–60
3	6	6:30pm	#7 Michigan State vs. #2 Purdue	BTN	74–56
3	7	9:00pm	#6 Penn State vs. #3 Wisconsin	BTN	36–33
Semifinals - Saturday, March 12
4	8	1:40pm	#4 Michigan vs. #1 Ohio State	CBS	61–68
4	9	4:00pm	#7 Michigan State vs. #6 Penn State	CBS	48–61
Championship - Sunday, March 13
5	10	3:30pm	#6 Penn State vs. #1 Ohio State	CBS	60–71
*Game times in ET. #-Rankings denote tournament seeding.

== Bracket ==
First round Thursday, March 10
8	Northwestern	75
9	Minnesota	65
7	Michigan State	66
10	Iowa	61
6	Penn State	61
11	Indiana	55

Quarterfinals; Friday, March 11
1	#1 Ohio State	67^{OT}
8	Northwestern	61
4	Michigan	60
5	Illinois	55
2	#9 Purdue	56
7	Michigan State	74
3	#13 Wisconsin	33
6	Penn State	36

Semifinals; Saturday, March 12
1	#1 Ohio State	68
4	Michigan	61
7	Michigan State	48
6	Penn State	61

Championship; Sunday, March 13
1	#1 Ohio State	71
6	Penn State	60

== Honors ==
=== All-Tournament Team ===
- Jared Sullinger, Ohio State – Big Ten tournament Most Outstanding Player
- Kalin Lucas, Michigan State
- Michael Thompson, Northwestern
- Jon Diebler, Ohio State
- William Buford, Ohio State
- Talor Battle, Penn State
