= 2010–11 Michigan State Spartans men's basketball team =

American college basketball season

2010–11 Michigan State Spartans men's basketball

NCAA tournament, Round of 64
- Conference: Big Ten Conference
- Record: 19–15 (9–9, Big Ten)
- Head coach: Tom Izzo (16th season)
- Associate head coach: Mark Montgomery (10th season)
- Assistant coaches: Dwayne Stephens (8th season); Mike Garland (4th season)
- Captains: Kalin Lucas; Draymond Green
- Home arena: Breslin Center

2010–11 Big Ten Conference men's basketball standings
	Conf.				Overall
Team	W		L	PCT	W		L	PCT
No. 1 Ohio State †	16	–	2	.889	34	–	3	.919
No. 13 Purdue	14	–	4	.778	26	–	8	.765
No. 16 Wisconsin	13	–	5	.722	25	–	9	.735
Michigan	9	–	9	.500	21	–	14	.600
Illinois	9	–	9	.500	20	–	14	.588
Penn State	9	–	9	.500	19	–	15	.559
Michigan State	9	–	9	.500	19	–	15	.559
Northwestern	7	–	11	.389	20	–	14	.588
Minnesota	6	–	12	.333	17	–	14	.548
Iowa	4	–	14	.222	11	–	20	.355
Indiana	3	–	15	.167	12	–	20	.375
† 2011 Big Ten tournament winner Rankings from AP poll

The 2010–11 Michigan State Spartans men's basketball team represented Michigan State University in the 2010–11 NCAA Division I men's basketball season. Tom Izzo led the Spartans in his 16th year at Michigan State. The team played their home games at the Breslin Center in East Lansing, Michigan, and competed in the Big Ten Conference. The Spartans finished the season 19–15, 9–9 in Big Ten play to finish in a tie for fourth place. The Spartans lost in the semifinals of the Big Ten tournament and received an at-large bid to the NCAA tournament, their 14th consecutive appearance. As a No. 10 seed, they lost in the round of 64 to UCLA.

== Previous season ==
The Spartans finished the 2009–10 season 28–9, 14–4 in Big Ten play to finish in a three-way tie for the regular season championship. MSU lost in the quarterfinals of the Big Ten tournament to Minnesota. Michigan State received a No. 5 seed in the NCAA tournament, their 13th straight trip to the tournament. There, they defeated New Mexico State, Maryland, Northern Iowa, and Tennessee to advance to the Final Four, their sixth overall trip and second consecutive trip under Tom Izzo. In the Final Four, they lost to Butler.

== Offseason ==
The Spartans lost Raymar Morgan (11.3 points and 6.2 rebounds per game) to graduation following the season. Chris Allen was also dismissed from the team following the season.

=== 2010 Recruiting class ===
College recruiting
Name	Hometown	School	Height	Weight	Commit date
Russell Byrd; No. 20 SG	Fort Wayne, Indiana	Blackhawk Christian	6 ft 7 in (2.01 m)	190 lb (86 kg)	Oct 24, 2008
Russell Byrd; No. 20 SG	Recruit ratings: Scout: Rivals: (94)				
Keith Appling; No. 4 PG	Detroit	Pershing High School	6 ft 3 in (1.91 m)	170 lb (77 kg)	Aug 8, 2008
Keith Appling; No. 4 PG	Recruit ratings: Scout: Rivals: (95)				
Alex Gauna; No. 15 C	Eaton Rapids, Michigan	Eaton Rapids High School	6 ft 8 in (2.03 m)	215 lb (98 kg)	Apr 30, 2009
Alex Gauna; No. 15 C	Recruit ratings: Scout: Rivals: (90)				
Adreian Payne; No. 9 PF	Dayton, Ohio	Jefferson Junior/Senior High School	6 ft 10 in (2.08 m)	215 lb (98 kg)	Oct 29, 2009
Adreian Payne; No. 9 PF	Recruit ratings: Scout: Rivals: (95)				
Overall recruit ranking: Scout: 10 Rivals: 11 ESPN: 10
Note: In many cases, Scout, Rivals, 247Sports, On3, and ESPN may conflict in their listings of height and weight.; In these cases, the average was taken. ESPN grades are on a 100-point scale.; Sources: "Michigan State Commit List for 2010". Rivals.; "Men's Basketball Recruiting". Scout.; "ESPN – Michigan State Spartans Basketball Recruiting 2010". ESPN.; "Scout.com Team Recruiting Rankings". Scout.; "2010 Team Ranking". Rivals.

== Season summary ==
The Spartans were led by seniors, Kalin Lucas (17.0 points and 3.4 assists per game) and Durrell Summers (11.6 points and 4.2 rebounds per game), and junior Draymond Green (12.6 points, 8.6 rebounds, and 4.1 assists per game). On the strength of their trip to the Final Four the previous year, the team began the season ranked No. 2 in the country. The Spartans made their second trip under Izzo to the Maui Invitational and were upset again, this time by UConn. In the third place game, Michigan State defeated No. 13 Washington. MSU suffered further losses to No. 1 Duke in the ACC-Big Ten Challenge, No. 8 Syracuse in the Jimmy V Classic, and No. 18 Texas. They finished the non-conference portion of their season 8–4 and ranked No. 20 in the country.

On January 26, 2011, backup point guard Korie Lucious, who averaged 6.5 points and 4.1 assists per game for the Spartans, was dismissed from the team.

The Spartans were inconsistent in conference play, beating No. 14 Minnesota and No. 20 Wisconsin, but suffering nine losses in conference and finishing the regular season with a 17–13 overall record and 9–9 in conference and in danger of missing the NCAA Tournament. After beating Iowa and blowing out No. 9 Purdue in the Big Ten tournament, the Spartans fell to Penn State in the semifinals. The blowout win over Purdue likely ensured the Spartans inclusion in the NCAA Tournament.

Michigan State received a No. 10 seed in the Southeast Region of the NCAA tournament, their 14th straight appearance, but the lowest seeding the Spartans had received in the NCAA Tournament since 2002. The Spartans faced No. 7-seeded UCLA in the second round (formerly known as the first round). They trailed by as many as 23 points in the first half and trailed 42–24 at the half. In the second half, MSU began to foul on nearly every possession and closed the lead, outscoring UCLA 52–36 in the half. However, the rally fell short and they lost 78–76.

== Roster ==
2010–11 Michigan State Spartans men's basketball team
Players
Coaches

Pos.	#	Name	Height	Weight	Year	Previous school	Hometown
G	11	Keith Appling	6 ft 0 in (1.83 m)	170 lb (77 kg)	Fr	Pershing H.S.	Detroit, Michigan
F	0	Russell Byrd (injured)	6 ft 7 in (2.01 m)	190 lb (86 kg)	Fr	Blackhawk Christian H.S.	Fort Wayne, Indiana
F	2	Alex Gauna	6 ft 8 in (2.03 m)	215 lb (98 kg)	Fr	Eaton Rapids H.S.	Eaton Rapids, Michigan
F	23	Draymond Green (C)	6 ft 6 in (1.98 m)	235 lb (107 kg)	Jr	Saginaw H.S.	Saginaw, Michigan
C	44	Anthony Ianni	6 ft 9 in (2.06 m)	260 lb (118 kg)	Sr	Okemos H.S.	East Lansing, Michigan
G	20	Mike Kebler (W)	6 ft 4 in (1.93 m)	205 lb (93 kg)	Sr	Okemos H.S.	Okemos, Michigan
G	1	Kalin Lucas (C)	6 ft 0 in (1.83 m)	190 lb (86 kg)	Sr	St. Mary Preparatory School	Detroit, Michigan
G	34	Korie Lucious	5 ft 11 in (1.8 m)	170 lb (77 kg)	Jr	Pius XI H.S.	Milwaukee, Wisconsin
C	25	Derrick Nix	6 ft 8 in (2.03 m)	280 lb (127 kg)	So	Pershing H.S.	Detroit, Michigan
C	5	Adreian Payne	6 ft 10 in (2.08 m)	215 lb (98 kg)	Fr	Jefferson H.S.	Dayton, Ohio
F	10	Delvon Roe	6 ft 8 in (2.03 m)	230 lb (104 kg)	Jr	St. Edward H.S.	Lakewood, Ohio
C	41	Garrick Sherman	6 ft 10 in (2.08 m)	235 lb (107 kg)	So	Kenton H.S.	Kenton, Ohio
G	15	Durrell Summers	6 ft 4 in (1.93 m)	205 lb (93 kg)	Sr	Covenant H.S.	Detroit, Michigan
G	13	Austin Thornton	6 ft 5 in (1.96 m)	220 lb (100 kg)	RS Jr	Cedar Springs H.S.	Sand Lake, Michigan

Head coach

- Tom Izzo (Northern Michigan)

Assistant coach(es)

- Mark Montgomery (Michigan State)
- Dwayne Stephens (Michigan State)
- Mike Garland (Northern Michigan)

Legend

- (C) Team captain
- (S) Suspended
- (I) Ineligible
- (W) Walk-on
- Injured
- Current redshirt

Roster
Last update: February 7, 2011

== Schedule and results ==
Date time, TV	Rank^{#}	Opponent^{#}	Result	Record	High points	High rebounds	High assists	Site (attendance) city, state
Exhibition
Nov 2, 2010*; 7:00 pm	No. 2	Saginaw Valley State	W 88–44	—	13 – Lucas	8 – Roe	4 – Green	Breslin Center (14,759); East Lansing, MI
Nov 8, 2010*; 7:00 pm	No. 2	Nebraska–Omaha	W 102–72	—	25 – Lucas	13 – Payne	5 – Lucas	Breslin Center (14,759); East Lansing, MI
Non-conference regular season
Nov 12, 2010*; 8:30 pm, BTN	No. 2	Eastern Michigan	W 96–66	1–0	18 – Lucas	8 – Green/Roe/Sherman	7 – Green	Breslin Center (14,797); East Lansing, MI
Nov 16, 2010*; 10:00 pm, ESPN	No. 2	South Carolina; College Hoops Tipoff Marathon	W 82–73	2–0	22 – Summers	12 – Green	7 – Lucas	Breslin Center (14,797); East Lansing, MI
Nov 22, 2010*; 9:30 pm, ESPNU	No. 2	at Chaminade; Maui Invitational first round	W 82–74	3–0	28 – Lucas	10 – Green	4 – Green	Lahaina Civic Center (2,400); Maui, HI
Nov 23, 2010*; 7:00 pm, ESPN	No. 2	vs. Connecticut; Maui Invitational semifinals	L 67–70	3–1	22 – Green	12 – Green	5 – Green	Lahaina Civic Center (2,400); Maui, HI
Nov 24, 2010*; 5:00 pm, ESPN2	No. 2	vs. No. 13 Washington; Maui Invitational third place game	W 76–71	4–1	29 – Lucas	6 – Green	5 – Lucious	Lahaina Civic Center (2,400); Maui, HI
Nov 28, 2010*; 1:00 pm, BTN	No. 2	Tennessee Tech	W 73–55	5–1	21 – Summers	9 – Green	6 – Green	Breslin Center (14,797); East Lansing, MI
Dec 1, 2010*; 9:30 pm, ESPN	No. 6	at No. 1 Duke; ACC–Big Ten Challenge	L 79–84	5–2	20 – Lucious	6 – Green/Payne	8 – Lucious	Cameron Indoor Stadium (9,314); Durham, NC
Dec 4, 2010*; 10:00 pm	No. 6	Bowling Green	W 74–39	6–2	14 – Summers	12 – Green	6 – Lucious	Breslin Center (14,797); East Lansing, MI
Dec 7, 2010*; 9:30 pm, ESPN	No. 7	vs. No. 8 Syracuse; Jimmy V Classic	L 58–72	6–3	18 – Summers	11 – Green	5 – Green/Lucious	Madison Square Garden (19,391); New York, NY
Dec 11, 2010*; 12:30 pm, FSDET	No. 7	vs. Oakland	W 77–76	7–3	25 – Lucas	7 – Sherman	5 – Green/Lucas	Palace of Auburn Hills (17,115); Auburn Hills, MI
Dec 18, 2010*; 6:30 pm, BTN	No. 14	Prairie View A&M	W 90–51	8–3	25 – Summers	9 – Thornton	8 – Lucas	Breslin Center (14,797); East Lansing, MI
Dec 22, 2010*; 7:00 pm, ESPN2	No. 12	No. 18 Texas	L 55–67	8–4	17 – Lucas	9 – Roe	2 – Lucas/Lucious/Thornton	Breslin Center (14,797); East Lansing, MI
Big Ten regular season
Dec 31, 2010; 4:00 pm, BTN	No. 20	No. 14 Minnesota	W 71–62	9–4 (1–0)	19 – Summers	9 – Roe	7 – Lucas	Breslin Center (14,797); East Lansing, MI
Jan 3, 2011; 7:30 pm, BTN	No. 18	at Northwestern	W 65–62	10–4 (2–0)	15 – green	11 – Green	5 – Lucious	Welsh-Ryan Arena (8,117); Evanston, IL
Jan 8, 2011; 1:00 pm, BTN	No. 18	at Penn State	L 62–66	10–5 (2–1)	21 – Summers	10 – Green	6 – Green	Bryce Jordan Center (8,564); University Park, PA
Jan 11, 2011; 7:00 pm, ESPN		No. 20 Wisconsin	W 64–61 ^{OT}	11–5 (3–1)	26 – Green	9 – Green	6 – Lucas	Breslin Center (14,797); East Lansing, Michigan
Jan 15, 2011; 1:00 pm, BTN		Northwestern	W 71–67 ^{OT}	12–5 (4–1)	19 – Appling	8 – Green	6 – Lucious	Breslin Center (14,797); East Lansing, MI
Jan 18, 2011; 7:00 pm, ESPN	No. 17	at No. 23 Illinois	L 62–71	12–6 (4–2)	15 – Lucas	10 – Roe	4 – Green	Assembly Hall (16,618); Champaign, IL
Jan 22, 2011; 9:00 pm, ESPN	No. 17	at No. 14 Purdue; ESPN College GameDay	L 76–86	12–7 (4–3)	21 – Green	11 – Green	6 – Green/Lucas/Lucious	Mackey Arena (14,123); West Lafayette, IN
Jan 27, 2011; 7:00 pm, ESPN	No. 25	Michigan; Rivalry	L 57–61	12–8 (4–4)	27 – Lucas	10 – Summers	5 – Green	Breslin Center (14,797); East Lansing, MI
Jan 30, 2011; 6:00 pm, BTN	No. 25	Indiana	W 84–83 ^{OT}	13–8 (5–4)	26 – Lucas	13 – Green	5 – Green	Breslin Center (14,797); East Lansing, MI
Feb 2, 2011; 8:30 pm, BTN		at Iowa	L 52–72	13–9 (5–5)	17 – Lucas	5 – Green	4 – Lucas	Carver–Hawkeye Arena (12,158); Iowa City, IA
Feb 6, 2011; 1:00 pm, CBS		at No. 19 Wisconsin	L 56–82	13–10 (5–6)	20 – Lucas	3 – Appling/Summers	3 – Lucas	Kohl Center (17,230); Madison, WI
Feb 10, 2011; 7:00 pm, BTN		Penn State	W 75–57	14–10 (6–6)	24 – Lucas	14 – Green	10 – Green	Breslin Center (14,797); East Lansing, MI
Feb 15, 2011; 9:00 pm, ESPN		at No. 2 Ohio State	L 61–71	14–11 (6–7)	14 – Lucas	6 – Appling/Green	5 – Lucas	Value City Arena (18,809); Columbus, OH
Feb 19, 2011; 9:00 pm, ESPN		Illinois; ESPN College GameDay	W 61–57	15–11 (7–7)	25 – Lucas	7 – Roe	4 – Roe	Breslin Center (14,797); East Lansing, MI
Feb 22, 2011; 9:00 pm, BTN		at Minnesota	W 53–48	16–11 (8–7)	18 – Lucas	10 – Green	3 – Green	Williams Arena (14,625); Minneapolis, MN
Feb 27, 2011; 1:00 pm, CBS		No. 8 Purdue	L 47–67	16–12 (8–8)	23 – Lucas	8 – Green	4 – Green	Breslin Center (14,797); East Lansing, MI
Mar 2, 2011; 6:30 pm, BTN		Iowa	W 85–66	17–12 (9–8)	18 – Appling	8 – Green	6 – Lucas	Breslin Center (14,797); East Lansing, MI
Mar 5, 2011; 2:00 pm, CBS		at Michigan; Rivalry	L 63–70	17–13 (9–9)	25 – Lucas	13 – Summers	3 – Appling/Roe	Crisler Arena (13,751); Ann Arbor, MI
Big Ten tournament
Mar 10, 2011; 5:00 pm, ESPN2	(7)	vs. (10) Iowa; Big Ten First Round	W 66–61	18–13	21 – Green	14 – Green	4 – Green/Lucas	Conseco Fieldhouse (16,264); Indianapolis, IN
Mar 11, 2011; 6:30 pm, BTN	(7)	vs. (2) No. 9 Purdue; Big Ten Quarterfinals	W 74–56	19–13	30 – Lucas	13 – Green	4 – Green	Conseco Fieldhouse (18,381); Indianapolis, IN
Mar 12, 2011; 4:00 pm, CBS	(7)	vs. (6) Penn State; Big Ten Semifinals	L 48–61	19–14	16 – Lucas	7 – Green	4 – Green	Conseco Fieldhouse (18,377); Indianapolis, IN
NCAA tournament
Mar 17, 2011*; 9:20 pm, TBS	(10 SE)	vs. (7 SE) UCLA; NCAA Second Round	L 76–78	19–15	23 – Green	11 – Green	10 – Green	St. Pete Times Forum (15,504); Tampa, FL
*Non-conference game. ^{#}Rankings from AP Poll. (#) Tournament seedings in parentheses. SE=NCAA Southeast Regional; Source. All times are in Eastern Time.

== Player statistics ==
Individual player statistics (Final)
		Minutes		Scoring		Total FGs			3-point FGs			Free-Throws			Rebounds							
Player	GP	Tot	Avg	Pts	Avg	FG	FGA	Pct	3FG	3FA	Pct	FT	FTA	Pct	Off	Def	Tot	Avg	A	Stl	Blk	Tov
Appling, Keith	34	780	22.9	217	6.4	72	165	.436	39	95	.411	34	38	.895	19	77	96	2.8	45	21	16	53
Chapman, Dan	4	4	1.0	0	0.0	0	0		0	0		0	0		0	0	0	0.0	0	0	0	1
Giard, Nick	5	6	1.2	0	0.0	0	0		0	0		0	0		0	0	0	0.0	0	0	0	0
Green, Draymond	34	1023	30.1	428	12.6	147	345	.426	37	101	.366	97	142	.683	81	210	294	8.6	141	60	38	79
Heneveld, Matt	4	7	1.8	0	0.0	0	1	.000	0	0		0	0		0	0	0	0.0	0	0	0	0
Ianni, Anthony	6	8	1.3	2	0.3	1	2	.500	0	0		0	0		0	4	4	0.7	0	0	0	0
Kebler, Mike	33	333	10.1	51	1.5	20	38	.526	0	1	.000	11	12	.917	7	25	32	1.0	16	9	5	11
Lucas, Kalin	34	1136	33.4	578	17.0	194	453	.428	53	136	.390	137	167	.820	16	57	73	2.1	114	35	2	87
Lucious, Korie	18	440	24.4	117	6.5	39	125	.312	23	81	.284	16	21	.762	10	21	31	1.7	74	15	3	38
Nix, Derrick	30	246	8.2	81	2.7	27	45	.600	0	0		27	51	.529	31	28	59	2.0	8	9	8	22
Payne, Adreian	34	306	9.0	85	2.5	34	72	.472	0	1	.000	17	35	.486	31	49	80	2.4	5	9	28	21
Roe, Delvon	34	802	23.6	209	6.1	71	147	.483	0	0		67	103	.650	64	107	171	5.0	49	27	42	38
Sherman, Garrick	34	410	12.1	107	3.1	48	69	.696	0	0		11	30	.367	29	62	91	2.7	12	10	14	28
Summers, Durrell	34	997	29.3	395	11.6	140	361	.388	62	174	.356	53	77	.688	36	108	144	4.2	22	19	8	49
Thornton, Austin	34	376	11.1	68	2.0	24	71	.338	6	31	.194	14	15	.933	29	42	71	2.1	23	5	3	21

Legend
GP	Games played	Avg	Average per game
FG	Field-goals made	FGA	Field-goal attempts	Off	Offensive rebounds
Def	Defensive rebounds	A	Assists	TO	Turnovers
Blk	Blocks	Stl	Steals

== Rankings ==
Ranking movement Legend: ██ Improvement in ranking. ██ Decrease in ranking. ██ Not ranked the previous week. RV=Others receiving votes. NR=Not Ranked.
Poll	Pre	Wk 2	Wk 3	Wk 4	Wk 5	Wk 6	Wk 7	Wk 8	Wk 9	Wk 10	Wk 11	Wk 12	Wk 13	Wk 14	Wk 15	Wk 16	Wk 17	WK 18	Wk 1	Final
AP	2	2	2	6	7	14	12	20	18	RV	17	25	NR	NR	NR	NR	NR	NR	NR	N/A
Coaches	2	2	2	6	8	15	12	19	19	24	18	RV	NR	NR	NR	NR	NR	NR	NR	NR

== Awards and honors ==
- Kalin Lucas – All Big Ten Second Team
- Kalin Lucas – USBWA All-District Team
- Draymond Green – All Big Ten Third Team
