= 2010–11 Minnesota Golden Gophers men's basketball team =

American college basketball season

2010–11 Minnesota Golden Gophers men's basketball

Puerto Rico Tip-Off Champions
- Conference: Big Ten Conference
- Record: 17–14 (6–12 Big Ten)
- Head coach: Tubby Smith
- Assistant coaches: Ron Jirsa; Saul Smith; Vince Taylor
- Home arena: Williams Arena

2010–11 Big Ten Conference men's basketball standings
	Conf.				Overall
Team	W		L	PCT	W		L	PCT
No. 1 Ohio State †	16	–	2	.889	34	–	3	.919
No. 13 Purdue	14	–	4	.778	26	–	8	.765
No. 16 Wisconsin	13	–	5	.722	25	–	9	.735
Michigan	9	–	9	.500	21	–	14	.600
Illinois	9	–	9	.500	20	–	14	.588
Penn State	9	–	9	.500	19	–	15	.559
Michigan State	9	–	9	.500	19	–	15	.559
Northwestern	7	–	11	.389	20	–	14	.588
Minnesota	6	–	12	.333	17	–	14	.548
Iowa	4	–	14	.222	11	–	20	.355
Indiana	3	–	15	.167	12	–	20	.375
† 2011 Big Ten tournament winner Rankings from AP poll

The 2010–11 Minnesota Golden Gophers men's basketball team represented the University of Minnesota in the college basketball season of 2010–2011. The team's head coach, Tubby Smith was in his fourth year at Minnesota. The Golden Gophers played their home games at Williams Arena in Minneapolis, Minnesota and were members of the Big Ten Conference.

== Season ==
The Gophers began their season without Devoe Joseph, who was suspended for 6 regular season games due to a violation of team rules. Despite this, the Gophers won the early season Puerto Rico Tip-Off tournament by defeating Western Kentucky, then 8th-ranked North Carolina, and West Virginia.

Joseph then abruptly left the team in January, transferring to the University of Oregon.

== Roster ==
#	Name	Height	Weight (lbs.)	Position	Class	Hometown	Previous Team(s)
0	Al Nolen	6'1"	188	G	Sr.	Minneapolis, MN, U.S.	Minneapolis Camden HS
4	Dominique Dawson	6'7"	240	F	So.	Minneapolis, MN, U.S.	Minneapolis SW HS
10	Oto Osenieks	6'8"	205	F	Fr.	Riga, Latvia	Brehm Prep
13	Maverick Ahanmisi	6'2"	175	G	Fr.	Santa Clarita, CA, U.S.	Stoneridge Prep
15	Maurice Walker	6'10"	289	F	Fr.	Scarborough, Ontario, Canada	Brewster Academy
20	Austin Hollins	6'4"	160	G	Fr.	Germantown, TN, U.S.	Germantown HS
22	Chris Halvorsen	6'8"	190	F	So.	St. Paul, MN, U.S.	Henry Sibley HS
23	Chip Armelin	6'3"	186	G	Fr.	Sulphur, LA, U.S.	Sulphur HS
24	Blake Hoffarber	6'4"	210	G	Sr.	Minnetonka, MN, U.S.	Hopkins HS
32	Trevor Mbakwe	6'8"	240	F	RJr.	Saint Paul, MN, U.S.	St. Bernard's HS; Miami Dade College
33	Rodney Williams	6'7"	200	F	So.	Minneapolis, MN, U.S.	Robbinsdale Cooper HS
45	Colton Iverson	6'10"	258	F/C	Jr.	Yankton, SD, U.S.	Yankton HS
50	Ralph Sampson III	6'11"	241	F/C	Jr.	Duluth, GA, U.S.	Northview HS
55	Elliott Eliason	6'11"	242	C	Fr.	Chadron, NE, U.S.	Chadron HS

== 2010–11 Schedule and results ==
Date time, TV	Rank^{#}	Opponent^{#}	Result	Record	Site (attendance) city, state
Exhibition
November 2, 2010*; 7:00 pm		Northeastern State	W 109–59		Williams Arena (10,405); Minneapolis, MN
November 8, 2010*; 7:00 pm		Winona State	W 78–72		Williams Arena (11,440); Minneapolis, MN
Non-conference regular season
November 12, 2010*; 7:00 pm		Wofford	W 69–55	1–0	Williams Arena (12,228); Minneapolis, MN
November 15, 2010*; 8:00 pm, ESPNU		Siena	W 76–69	2–0	Williams Arena (10,752); Minneapolis, MN
November 18, 2010*; 6:30 pm, ESPN3		vs. Western Kentucky; Puerto Rico Tip-Off–Quarterfinal	W 95–77	3–0	Coliseo de Puerto Rico (7,205); San Juan, PR
November 19, 2010*; 7:30 pm, ESPNU		vs. No. 8 North Carolina; Puerto Rico Tip-Off–Semifinal	W 72–67	4–0	Coliseo de Puerto Rico (10,127); San Juan, PR
November 21, 2010*; 6:30 pm, ESPN2		vs. West Virginia Mountaineers; Puerto Rico Tip-Off–Championship	W 74–70	5–0	Coliseo de Puerto Rico (11,575); San Juan, PR
November 24, 2010*; 7:00 pm, ESPN3	No. 15	North Dakota State	W 84–65	6–0	Williams Arena (12,056); Minneapolis, MN
November 29, 2010*; 6:00 pm, ESPN2	No. 15	Virginia; ACC–Big Ten Challenge	L 79–87	6–1	Williams Arena (12,089); Minneapolis, MN
December 4, 2010*; 7:00 pm, BTN	No. 15	Cornell	W 71–66	7–1	William's Arena (12,633); Minneapolis, MN
December 8, 2010*; 6:00 pm	No. 22	at Saint Joseph's	W 83–73	8–1	Hagan Arena (3,911); Philadelphia, PA
December 11, 2010*; 12:00 pm, BTN	No. 22	Eastern Kentucky	W 71–58	9–1	Williams Arena (11,081); Minneapolis, MN
December 15, 2010*; 7:30 pm, BTN	No. 21	Akron	W 66–58	10–1	Williams Arena (11,237); Minneapolis, MN
December 23, 2010*; 7:00 pm, ESPN3	No. 17	South Dakota State	W 85–73	11–1	Williams Arena (13,302); Minneapolis, MN
Big Ten regular season
December 28, 2010; 6:00 pm, ESPN2	No. 14	at Wisconsin	L 60–68	11–2 (0–1)	Kohl Center (17,230); Madison, WI
December 31, 2010; 3:00 pm, BTN	No. 14	at No. 20 Michigan State	L 62–71	11–3 (0–2)	Breslin Center (14,797); East Lansing, MI
January 4, 2011; 6:00 pm, ESPN2		Indiana	W 67–63	12–3 (1–2)	Williams Arena (12,727); Minneapolis, MN
January 9, 2011; 1:00 pm, BTN		at No. 2 Ohio State	L 64–67	12–4 (1–3)	Jerome Schottenstein Center (17,392); Columbus, OH
January 13, 2011; 6:00 pm, ESPN		No. 8 Purdue	W 70–67	13–4 (2–3)	Williams Arena (14,625); Minneapolis, MN
January 16, 2011; 5:00 pm, BTN		Iowa	W 69–59	14–4 (3–3)	Williams Arena (14,625); Minneapolis, MN
January 22, 2011; 6:00 pm, BTN	No. 15	at Michigan	W 69–64	15–4 (4–3)	Crisler Arena (12,378); Ann Arbor, MI
January 26, 2011; 7:30 pm, BTN	No. 16	Northwestern	W 81–70	16–4 (5–3)	Williams Arena (14,625); Minneapolis, MN
January 29, 2011; 12:00 pm, CBS	No. 16	at No. 12 Purdue	L 61–73	16–5 (5–4)	Mackey Arena (14,123); West Lafayette, IN
February 2, 2011; 5:30 pm, BTN	No. 18	at Indiana	L 57–60	16–6 (5–5)	Assembly Hall (16,168); Bloomington, IN
February 6, 2011; 1:00 pm, ESPN	No. 18	No. 1 Ohio State	L 69–82	16–7 (5–6)	Williams Arena (14,625); Minneapolis, MN
February 10, 2011; 8:00 pm, ESPN		Illinois	L 62–71	16–8 (5–7)	Williams Arena (14,625); Minneapolis, MN
February 13, 2011; 5:00 pm, BTN		at Iowa	W 62–45	17–8 (6–7)	Carver-Hawkeye Arena (12,759); Iowa City, IA
February 17, 2011; 6:00 pm, ESPN		at Penn State	L 63–66	17–9 (6–8)	Bryce Jordan Center (8,446); University Park, PA
February 22, 2011; 8:00 pm, BTN		Michigan State	L 48–53	17–10 (6–9)	Williams Arena (14,625); Minneapolis, MN
February 26, 2011; 3:30 pm, BTN		Michigan	L 63–70	17–11 (6–10)	Williams Arena (14,625); Minneapolis, MN
March 2, 2011; 7:30 pm, BTN		at Northwestern	L 57–68	17–12 (6–11)	Welsh-Ryan Arena (4,584); Evanston, IL
March 6, 2011; 12:00 pm, BTN		Penn State	L 63–66	17–13 (6–12)	Williams Arena (14,625); Minneapolis, MN
Big Ten tournament
March 10, 2011; 1:30 pm, ESPN2	(9)	vs. (8) Northwestern; Big Ten First Round	L 65–75	17–14	Conseco Fieldhouse; Indianapolis, IN
*Non-conference game. ^{#}Rankings from AP Poll. (#) Tournament seedings in parentheses. All times are in Central Time.

== Rankings ==
Poll	Pre	Wk 1	Wk 2	Wk 3	Wk 4	Wk 5	Wk 6	Wk 7	Wk 8	Wk 9	Wk 10	Wk 11	Wk 12	Wk 13	Wk 14	Wk 15	Wk 16	Wk 17	Wk 18	Final
AP	RV	RV	15	15	22	21	17	14	RV	RV	15	16	18	RV	RV	NR				
Coaches	RV	RV	17	13	20	20	16	13	21	25	19	18	20	25	RV	NR				
