= 2010–11 Wisconsin Badgers men's basketball team =

American college basketball season

2010–11 Wisconsin Badgers men's basketball

NCAA tournament, Sweet Sixteen
- Conference: Big Ten Conference

Ranking
- Coaches: No. 15
- AP: No. 16
- Record: 25–9 (13–5 Big Ten)
- Head coach: Bo Ryan (10th season)
- Associate head coach: Greg Gard
- Assistant coaches: Gary Close; Lamont Paris
- Home arena: Kohl Center

2010–11 Big Ten Conference men's basketball standings
	Conf.				Overall
Team	W		L	PCT	W		L	PCT
No. 1 Ohio State †	16	–	2	.889	34	–	3	.919
No. 13 Purdue	14	–	4	.778	26	–	8	.765
No. 16 Wisconsin	13	–	5	.722	25	–	9	.735
Michigan	9	–	9	.500	21	–	14	.600
Illinois	9	–	9	.500	20	–	14	.588
Penn State	9	–	9	.500	19	–	15	.559
Michigan State	9	–	9	.500	19	–	15	.559
Northwestern	7	–	11	.389	20	–	14	.588
Minnesota	6	–	12	.333	17	–	14	.548
Iowa	4	–	14	.222	11	–	20	.355
Indiana	3	–	15	.167	12	–	20	.375
† 2011 Big Ten tournament winner Rankings from AP poll

The 2010–11 Wisconsin Badgers men's basketball team represented the University of Wisconsin–Madison in the 2010–11 NCAA Division I men's basketball season. The team was led by Bo Ryan in his 10th season as coach of the Badgers. They played their home games at the Kohl Center in Madison, Wisconsin as members of the Big Ten Conference. They finished the season 25–9, 13–5 in Big Ten play to finish in fourth place. They lost in the quarterfinals of the Big Ten tournament to Penn State. The Badgers received an at-large bid to the NCAA tournament as the No. 4 seed in the Southeast Region. There they defeated Belmont in the Second Round before beating Kansas State in the Third Round to advance to the Sweet Sixteen. In the Sweet Sixteen, they were defeated by eventual National Runner-up Butler.

== Previous season ==
The Badgers finished the 2009–10 season 24–9, 13–5 in Big Ten play to finish in fourth place. They lost in the quarterfinals of the Big Ten tournament to Illinois. They received an at-large bid to the NCAA tournament as the No. 4 seed in the East region. There they defeated 13th-seeded Wofford in the First Round before being upset by 12th-seeded Cornell in the Second Round.

== 2010 recruiting class ==
College recruiting information
Name	Hometown	School	Height	Weight	Commit date
Evan Anderson; C	Stanley, WI	Eau Claire North	6 ft 10 in (2.08 m)	250 lb (110 kg)	Apr 4, 2008
Evan Anderson; C	Recruit ratings: Scout: Rivals:				
Ben Brust; PG	Hawthorn Woods, IL	Mundelein High School	6 ft 1 in (1.85 m)	190 lb (86 kg)	May 7, 2010
Ben Brust; PG	Recruit ratings: Scout: Rivals:				
Duje Dukan; SF	Deerfield, IL	Deerfield High School	6 ft 8 in (2.03 m)	205 lb (93 kg)	Nov 10, 2009
Duje Dukan; SF	Recruit ratings: Scout: Rivals:				
Josh Gasser; PG	Port Washington, WI	Port Washington High School	6 ft 3 in (1.91 m)	185 lb (84 kg)	Sep 24, 2009
Josh Gasser; PG	Recruit ratings: Scout: Rivals:				
Overall recruit ranking:
Note: In many cases, Scout, Rivals, 247Sports, On3, and ESPN may conflict in their listings of height and weight.; In these cases, the average was taken. ESPN grades are on a 100-point scale.; Sources: "Wisconsin Commit List for 2010". Rivals.; "Men's Basketball Recruiting". Scout.; "ESPN – Wisconsin Badgers Basketball Recruiting 2010". ESPN.; "Scout.com Team Recruiting Rankings". Scout.; "2010 Team Ranking". Rivals.

== Roster ==
2010–11 Wisconsin Badgers men's basketball team
Players
Coaches

Pos.	#	Name	Height	Weight	Year	Hometown
G	1	Ben Brust	6 ft 1 in (1.85 m)	190 lb (86 kg)	Fr	Hawthorn Woods, IL
G	2	Wquinton Smith (W)	5 ft 10 in (1.78 m)	205 lb (93 kg)	Sr	Milwaukee, WI
G/F	5	Ryan Evans	6 ft 6 in (1.98 m)	210 lb (95 kg)	RS So	Phoenix, AZ
G	10	Dan Fahey (W)	6 ft 3 in (1.91 m)	195 lb (88 kg)	So	Chicago, IL
G	11	Jordan Taylor	6 ft 1 in (1.85 m)	195 lb (88 kg)	Jr	Bloomington, MN
F	13	Duje Dukan	6 ft 8 in (2.03 m)	205 lb (93 kg)	Fr	Deerfield, IL
G	15	Brett Valentyn (W)	6 ft 4 in (1.93 m)	195 lb (88 kg)	RS Sr	Verona, WI
G	21	Josh Gasser	6 ft 3 in (1.91 m)	185 lb (84 kg)	Fr	Port Washington, WI
G	22	J.D. Wise (W)	6 ft 0 in (1.83 m)	185 lb (84 kg)	So	Milwaukee, WI
G/F	24	Tim Jarmusz	6 ft 6 in (1.98 m)	205 lb (93 kg)	Sr	Oshkosh, WI
F	30	Jon Leuer	6 ft 10 in (2.08 m)	228 lb (103 kg)	Sr	Orono, MN
F	31	Mike Bruesewitz	6 ft 6 in (1.98 m)	220 lb (100 kg)	So	St. Paul, MN
C	32	Evan Anderson (redshirt)	6 ft 10 in (2.08 m)	250 lb (113 kg)	Fr	Stanley, WI
G/F	33	Rob Wilson	6 ft 4 in (1.93 m)	198 lb (90 kg)	Jr	Cleveland, OH
F/C	40	Jared Berggren	6 ft 10 in (2.08 m)	235 lb (107 kg)	RS So	Princeton, MN
C	44	J.P. Gavinski	6 ft 11 in (2.11 m)	255 lb (116 kg)	RS Sr	Wisconsin Dells, WI
F	52	Keaton Nankivil	6 ft 8 in (2.03 m)	240 lb (109 kg)	Sr	Madison, WI

Head coach

- Bo Ryan (Wilkes)

Assistant coach(es)

- Greg Gard (UW-Platteville)
- Gary Close (Arizona State)
- Lamont Paris (Wooster)

Legend

- (C) Team captain
- (S) Suspended
- (I) Ineligible
- (W) Walk-on
- Injured
- Current redshirt

Roster
Last update: 2010-11-9

== Schedule and results ==
Date time, TV	Rank^{#}	Opponent^{#}	Result	Record	Site (attendance) city, state
Exhibition
Nov 06, 2010*; 7:00 pm		Wisconsin–La Crosse	W 84–59	—	Kohl Center (17,230); Madison, WI
Nov 10, 2010*; 7:00 pm		Minnesota State	W 93–59	—	Kohl Center (17,230); Madison, WI
Non-conference regular season
Nov 14, 2010*; 5:00 pm		Prairie View A&M	W 99–55	1–0	Kohl Center (17,230); Madison, WI
Nov 16, 2010*; 7:00 pm		North Dakota	W 85–53	2–0	Kohl Center (17,230); Madison, WI
Nov 20, 2010*; 6:00 pm, Versus		at UNLV	L 65–68	2–1	Thomas & Mack Center (14,736); Paradise, NV
Nov 25, 2010*; 1:00 pm, ESPN2		vs. Manhattan; Old Spice Classic Quarterfinals	W 50–35	3–1	HP Field House (3,035); Orlando, FL
Nov 26, 2010*; 11:00 am, ESPN		vs. Boston College; Old Spice Classic Semifinals	W 65–55	4–1	HP Field House (3,229); Orlando, FL
Nov 28, 2010*; 6:00 pm, ESPN2		vs. Notre Dame; Old Spice Classic Championship	L 51–58	4–2	HP Field House (3,428); Orlando, FL
Dec 1, 2010*; 6:15 pm, ESPN2		NC State; ACC–Big Ten Challenge	W 87–48	5–2	Kohl Center (17,230); Madison, WI
Dec 4, 2010*; 1:00 pm		South Dakota	W 76–61	6–2	Kohl Center (17,230); Madison, WI
Dec 8, 2011*; 7:30 pm, BTN		Milwaukee	W 61–40	7–2	Kohl Center (17,230); Madison, WI
Dec 11, 2010*; 1:30 pm, ESPN2		at Marquette	W 69–64	8–2	Bradley Center (19,074); Milwaukee, WI
Dec 13, 2010*; 7:00 pm, BTN		Green Bay	W 70–56	9–2	Kohl Center (17,230); Madison, WI
Dec 23, 2010*; 7:00 pm		Coppin State	W 80–56	10–2	Kohl Center (17,230); Madison, WI
Big Ten regular season
Dec 28, 2010; 6:00 pm, ESPN2		No. 14 Minnesota	W 68–60	11–2 (1–0)	Kohl Center (17,230); Madison, WI
Jan 2, 2011; 5:00 pm, BTN		at No. 23 Illinois	L 61–69	11–3 (1–1)	Assembly Hall (16,618); Champaign, IL
Jan 5, 2011; 7:30 pm, BTN		Michigan	W 66–50	12–3 (2–1)	Kohl Center (17,230); Madison, WI
Jan 11, 2011; 6:00 pm, ESPN	No. 20	at Michigan State	L 61–64 ^{OT}	12–4 (2–2)	Breslin Center (14,797); East Lansing, MI
Jan 15, 2011; 2:00 pm, BTN	No. 20	No. 16 Illinois	W 76–66	13–4 (3–2)	Kohl Center (17,230); Madison, WI
Jan 20, 2011; 8:00 pm, ESPN	No. 18	Indiana	W 69–60	14–4 (4–2)	Kohl Center (17,230); Madison, WI
Jan 23, 2011; 11:30 am, BTN	No. 18	at Northwestern	W 78–46	15–4 (5–2)	Welsh-Ryan Arena (7,102); Evanston, IL
Jan 29, 2011; 3:00 pm, BTN	No. 17	at Penn State	L 52–56	15–5 (5–3)	Bryce Jordan Center (14,292); University Park, PA
Feb 1, 2011; 6:00 pm, ESPN	No. 19	No. 11 Purdue	W 66–59	16–5 (6–3)	Kohl Center (17,230); Madison, WI
Feb 6, 2011; 12:00 pm, CBS	No. 19	Michigan State	W 82–56	17–5 (7–3)	Kohl Center (17,230); Madison, WI
Feb 9, 2011; 7:30 pm, BTN	No. 13	at Iowa	W 62–59 ^{OT}	18–5 (8–3)	Carver-Hawkeye Arena (12,093); Iowa City, IA
Feb 12, 2011; 1:00 pm, ESPN	No. 13	No. 1 Ohio State	W 71–67	19–5 (9–3)	Kohl Center (17,230); Madison, WI
Feb 16, 2011; 5:30 pm, BTN	No. 10	at No. 11 Purdue	L 62–70	19–6 (9–4)	Mackey Arena (14,123); West Lafayette, IN
Feb 20, 2011; 5:00 pm, BTN	No. 10	Penn State	W 76–66	20–6 (10–4)	Kohl Center (17,230); Madison, WI
Feb 23, 2011; 5:30 pm, BTN	No. 12	at Michigan	W 53–52	21–6 (11–4)	Crisler Arena (11,023); Ann Arbor, MI
Feb 27, 2011; 5:00 pm, BTN	No. 12	Northwestern	W 78–63	22–6 (12–4)	Kohl Center (17,230); Madison, WI
Mar 3, 2011; 8:00 pm, ESPN	No. 10	at Indiana	W 77–67	23–6 (13–4)	Assembly Hall (16,700); Bloomington, IN
Mar 6, 2011; 3:00 pm, CBS	No. 10	at No. 1 Ohio State	L 65–93	23–7 (13–5)	Value City Arena (18,809); Columbus, OH
Big Ten tournament
Mar 11, 2011; 8:00 pm, BTN	(3) No. 13	vs. (6) Penn State; Big Ten Quarterfinals	L 33–36	23–8	Conseco Fieldhouse (18,381); Indianapolis, IN
NCAA tournament
Mar 17, 2011*; 6:27 pm, truTV	(4 SE) No. 16	vs. (13 SE) Belmont; NCAA Second Round	W 72–58	24–8	McKale Center (10,293); Tucson, AZ
Mar 19, 2011*; 7:40 pm, TNT	(4 SE) No. 16	vs. (5 SE) No. 21 Kansas State; NCAA Third Round	W 70–65	25–8	McKale Center (11,267); Tucson, AZ
Mar 24, 2011*; 8:57 pm, TBS	(4 SE) No. 16	vs. (8 SE) Butler; NCAA Sweet Sixteen	L 54–61	25–9	New Orleans Arena (12,320); New Orleans, LA
*Non-conference game. ^{#}Rankings from AP Poll. (#) Tournament seedings in parentheses. SE=NCAA Southeast Regional. All times are in Central Time.

== Rankings ==
Regular season polls
Poll	Pre- Season	Week 1	Week 2	Week 3	Week 4	Week 5	Week 6	Week 7	Week 8	Week 9	Week 10	Week 11	Week 12	Week 13	Week 14	Week 15	Week 16	Week 17	Week 18	Final
AP	RV	RV	RV			RV	RV	RV	RV	20	18	17	19	13	10	12	10	13	16	
Coaches	25	25	RV	RV	RV	RV	RV	24	RV	21	17	15	18	14	10	12	10	13	16	15

Legend
	Increase in ranking
	Decrease in ranking
	No change
(RV)	Received votes

== Player statistics ==
		        MINUTES    |--TOTAL--|   |--3-PTS--| |-F-THROWS-| |---REBOUNDS---|                 |-SCORING-| 
## Player           GP GS Tot  Avg  FG  FGA  Pct  3FG 3FA Pct FT FTA  Pct  Off Def Tot Avg PF FO A TO Blk Stl Pts Avg 
30 Leuer, Jon       34 34 1139 33.5 227 483 .470  54 146 .370 113 134 .843  57 189 246 7.2 75 1 56  54 30 17 621 18.3
11 Taylor, Jordan   34 34 1241 36.5 194 448 .433  75 175 .429 154 185 .832  32 107 139 4.1 80 3 161 42  5 25 617 18.1
52 Nankivil, Keaton 34 34 949  27.9 120 242 .496  59 129 .457  31  37 .838  62  82 144 4.2 67 2 23  29 42 16 330  9.7
21 Gasser, Josh     34 30 957  28.1 68  144 .472  19  63 .302  47  55 .855  42  90 132 3.9 80 3 75  30  2 17 202  5.9
31 Bruesewitz, Mike 34 13 675  19.9 57  121 .471  20  62 .323  22  29 .759  45  60 105 3.1 63 0 34  28  4 10 156  4.6
24 Jarmusz, Tim     34 21 805  23.7 40  105 .381  32  89 .360  21  23 .913  29  46 75  2.2 35 1 43  12  1 23 133  3.9
05 Evans, Ryan      34 0  393  11.6 33  106 .311  0   3  .000  29  39 .744  20  59 79  2.3 39 0 16  23 11  6  95  2.8 
40 Berggren, Jared  29 1  200   6.9 27  55  .491  7   22 .318   8  13 .615  10  21 31  1.1 37 1 9   14 10  1  69  2.4
33 Wilson, Rob      23 2  168   7.3 14  42  .333  1   17 .059   7   8 .875   7  16 23  1.0 14 0 8   6   0  2  36  1.6
15 Valentyn, Brett  24 0  123   5.1  8  23  .348  8   23 .348   1   2 .500   2   7  9  0.4 12 0 4   4   0  1  25  1.0
01 Brust, Ben       15 0   45   3.0  4  16  .250  2   10 .200   0   0 .000   2   5  7  0.5 5  0 1   2   0  1  10  0.7 
02 Smith, Wquinton  26 1  128   4.9  5  16  .313  1   5  .200   2   6 .333   8   4 12  0.5 12 0 12  4   0  2  13  0.5 
13 Dukan, Duje       8 0   15   1.9  1   4  .250  0   0  .000   0   0 .000   2   3  5  0.6 1  0 0   0   0  0   2  0.3
44 Gavinski, J.P.    6 0    9   1.5  0   3  .000  0   0  .000   1   2 .500   2   0  2  0.3 2  0 0   1   0  0   1  0.2
22 Wise, J.D.        1 0    1   1.0  0   0  .000  0   0  .000   0   0 .000   0   0  0  0.0 0  0 0   0   0  0   0  0.0
10 Fahey, Dan        3 0    2   0.7  0   0  .000  0   0  .000   0   0 .000   0   0  0  0.0 0  0 0   0   0  0   0  0.0
   Team                                                                    35  44  79  2.3 0        9 
   Total..........  34   6850  798 1808 .441 278 744 .374 436 533 .818 355 733 1088 32.0 522 11 442 258 105 121 2310 67.9
   Opponents......  34   6850  705 1647 .428 179 484 .370 403 542 .744 273 695 968  28.5 570 8  325 329  61 133 1992 58.6

As of March 25, 2011

== Awards ==
All-Big Ten by Media

- Jordan Taylor - 1st team (unanimous)
- Jon Leuer - 2nd team
- Keaton Nankivil - Honorable mention

All-Big Ten by Coaches

- Jordan Taylor - 1st team & All-Defensive team
- Jon Leuer - 1st team
- Keaton Nankivil - Honorable mention
