= 2010–11 Iowa Hawkeyes men's basketball team =

American college basketball season

2010–11 Iowa Hawkeyes men's basketball
- Conference: Big Ten Conference
- Record: 11–20 (4–14, 10th Big Ten)
- Head coach: Fran McCaffery (1st season)
- Assistant coaches: Sherman Dillard; Andrew Francis; Kirk Speraw
- Home arena: Carver-Hawkeye Arena (Capacity: 15,500)

2010–11 Big Ten Conference men's basketball standings
	Conf.				Overall
Team	W		L	PCT	W		L	PCT
No. 1 Ohio State †	16	–	2	.889	34	–	3	.919
No. 13 Purdue	14	–	4	.778	26	–	8	.765
No. 16 Wisconsin	13	–	5	.722	25	–	9	.735
Michigan	9	–	9	.500	21	–	14	.600
Illinois	9	–	9	.500	20	–	14	.588
Penn State	9	–	9	.500	19	–	15	.559
Michigan State	9	–	9	.500	19	–	15	.559
Northwestern	7	–	11	.389	20	–	14	.588
Minnesota	6	–	12	.333	17	–	14	.548
Iowa	4	–	14	.222	11	–	20	.355
Indiana	3	–	15	.167	12	–	20	.375
† 2011 Big Ten tournament winner Rankings from AP poll

The 2010–11 Iowa Hawkeyes men's basketball team represented the University of Iowa in the 2010–11 college basketball season. The team was led by head coach Fran McCaffery and played their home games at Carver-Hawkeye Arena, which has been their home since 1983. They were members of the Big Ten Conference. They finished the season 11–20, 4–14 in Big Ten play to finish in 10th place and lost in the first round of the Big Ten tournament to Michigan State.

== Roster ==
2010–11 Iowa Hawkeyes men's basketball team
Players
Coaches

Pos.	#	Name	Height	Weight	Year	Hometown
F	1	Melsahn Basabe	6 ft 7 in (2.01 m)	225 lb (102 kg)	Fr	Glen Cove, NY
G	2	Jordan Stoermer	6 ft 2 in (1.88 m)	185 lb (84 kg)	Jr	Coralville, IA
G	3	Cully Payne (injured)	6 ft 1 in (1.85 m)	185 lb (84 kg)	So	Schaumburg, IL
G/F	4	Roy Devyn Marble	6 ft 5 in (1.96 m)	190 lb (86 kg)	Fr	Southfield, MI
G	5	Matt Gatens	6 ft 5 in (1.96 m)	215 lb (98 kg)	Jr	Iowa City, IA
F	11	Cody Cox	6 ft 4 in (1.93 m)	190 lb (86 kg)	Jr	Waterloo, IA
F	13	T. J. Sayre	6 ft 6 in (1.98 m)	220 lb (100 kg)	Sr	Cedar Rapids, IA
F	15	Zach McCabe	6 ft 7 in (2.01 m)	225 lb (102 kg)	Fr	Sioux City, IA
F	20	Andrew Brommer	6 ft 9 in (2.06 m)	235 lb (107 kg)	Jr	Rosemount, MN
G	24	Bryce Cartwright	6 ft 1 in (1.85 m)	180 lb (82 kg)	Jr	Compton, CA
G	25	Eric May	6 ft 5 in (1.96 m)	220 lb (100 kg)	So	Dubuque, IA
G	32	Brandon Stubbs	6 ft 2 in (1.88 m)	170 lb (77 kg)	Fr	Pleasant Hill, IA
F	34	Darius Stokes	6 ft 7 in (2.01 m)	190 lb (86 kg)	Fr	Cedar Rapids, IA
F	35	Devon Archie	6 ft 9 in (2.06 m)	225 lb (102 kg)	RS Jr	Indianapolis, IN
F	50	Jarryd Cole	6 ft 7 in (2.01 m)	250 lb (113 kg)	Sr	Kansas City, KS

Head coach

- Fran McCaffery

Assistant coach(es)

- Sherman Dillard
- Andrew Francis
- Kirk Speraw

Athletic trainer(s)

- John Sreif

Legend

- (C) Team captain
- (S) Suspended
- (I) Ineligible
- (W) Walk-on
- Injured
- Current redshirt

Roster
Last update: February 7, 2011

== 2010 Commitments ==
College recruiting information
Name	Hometown	School	Height	Weight	Commit date
Melsahn Basabe; PF	Glen Cove, NY	St. Mark's High School	6 ft 7 in (2.01 m)	215 lb (98 kg)	May 1, 2010
Melsahn Basabe; PF	Recruit ratings: Scout: Rivals: (89)				
Roy Devyn Marble; SG	Southfield, MI	Southfield-Lathrup High School	6 ft 5 in (1.96 m)	173 lb (78 kg)	Jul 2, 2009
Roy Devyn Marble; SG	Recruit ratings: Scout: Rivals: (89)				
Zach McCabe; SF	Sioux City, IA	Bishop Heelen High School	6 ft 6 in (1.98 m)	191 lb (87 kg)	Jul 17, 2009
Zach McCabe; SF	Recruit ratings: Scout: Rivals: (87)				
Bryce Cartwright; PG	Paris, TX	Paris J.C.	6 ft 0 in (1.83 m)	170 lb (77 kg)	Jun 7, 2010
Bryce Cartwright; PG	Recruit ratings: Scout: Rivals: (40)				
Overall recruit ranking:
Note: In many cases, Scout, Rivals, 247Sports, On3, and ESPN may conflict in their listings of height and weight.; In these cases, the average was taken. ESPN grades are on a 100-point scale.; Sources: "ESPN- Iowa Hawkeyes Men's Basketball Recruiting". ESPN.; "2010 Team Ranking". Rivals.

== Schedule and results ==
Date time, TV	Rank^{#}	Opponent^{#}	Result	Record	Site (attendance) city, state
Exhibition
November 7, 2010*; 3:35 pm		Illinois–Springfield	W 111–66	–	Carver-Hawkeye Arena (9,050); Iowa City, IA
Regular Season
November 14, 2010*; 2:01 pm, BTN		South Dakota State	L 69–79	0–1	Carver-Hawkeye Arena (11,700); Iowa City, IA
November 16, 2010*; 7:35 pm		Louisiana–Monroe	W 68–40	1–1	Carver-Hawkeye Arena (9,023); Iowa City, IA
November 19, 2010*; 7:35 pm		vs. Xavier; Paradise Jam	L 73–86	1–2	Sports and Fitness Center (3,122); St. Thomas, VI
November 20, 2010*; 5:10 pm		vs. Alabama; Paradise Jam	W 55–47	2–2	Sports and Fitness Center (2,348); St. Thomas, VI
November 22, 2010*; 2:30 pm		vs. Long Beach State; Paradise Jam	L 72–78	2–3	Sports and Fitness Center; St. Thomas, VI
November 26, 2010*; 5:35 pm, BTN		SIU Edwardsville	W 111–50	3–3	Carver-Hawkeye Arena (11,698); Iowa City, IA
November 30, 2010*; 6:05 pm, ESPNU		at Wake Forest; ACC-Big Ten Challenge	L 73–76	3–4	LJVM Coliseum (9,086); Winston-Salem, NC
December 4, 2010*; 12:32 pm		Idaho State	W 70–53	4–4	Carver-Hawkeye Arena (9,764); Iowa City, IA
December 7, 2010*; 7:00 pm, BTN		Northern Iowa; Iowa Big Four	W 51–39	5–4	Carver-Hawkeye Arena (10,667); Iowa City, IA
December 10, 2010*; 7:35 pm, BTN		Iowa State; Hy-Vee Cy-Hawk Series	L 72–75	5–5	Carver-Hawkeye Arena (13,276); Iowa City, IA
December 18, 2010*; 7:00 pm		at Drake; Iowa Big Four	W 59–52	6–5	Knapp Center (6,671); Des Moines, IA
December 21, 2010*; 7:05 pm		Louisiana Tech	W 77–58	7–5	Carver-Hawkeye Arena (10,344); Iowa City, IA
December 29, 2010; 8:05 pm, BTN		No. 23 Illinois	L 77–87	7–6 (0–1)	Carver-Hawkeye Arena (15,500); Iowa City, IA
January 4, 2011; 8:05 pm, BTN		No. 2 Ohio State	L 68–73	7–7 (0–2)	Carver-Hawkeye Arena (9,810); Iowa City, IA
January 9, 2011; 11:05 am, BTN		at No. 11 Purdue	L 52–75	7–8 (0–3)	Mackey Arena (14,123); West Lafayette, IN
January 12, 2011; 7:35 pm, BTN		Northwestern	L 71–90	7–9 (0–4)	Carver-Hawkeye Arena (9,548); Iowa City, IA
January 16, 2011; 5:05 pm, BTN		at Minnesota	L 59–69	7–10 (0–5)	Williams Arena (14,625); Minneapolis, MN
January 19, 2011; 5:35 pm, BTN		at No. 1 Ohio State	L 48–70	7–11 (0–6)	Jerome Schottenstein Center (18,809); Columbus, OH
January 23, 2011; 2:05 pm, BTN		Indiana	W 91–77	8–11 (1–6)	Carver-Hawkeye Arena (11,860); Iowa City, IA
January 26, 2011; 5:35 pm, BTN		at Penn State	L 51–65	8–12 (1–7)	Bryce Jordan Center (6,625); University Park, PA
January 30, 2011; 3:05 pm, BTN		at Michigan	L 73–87	8–13 (1–8)	Crisler Arena (12,978); Ann Arbor, MI
February 2, 2011; 7:35 pm, BTN		Michigan State	W 72–52	9–13 (2–8)	Carver-Hawkeye Arena (12,158); Iowa City, IA
February 5, 2011; 3:05 pm, ESPN2		at Indiana	W 64–63	10–13 (3–8)	Assembly Hall (17,225); Bloomington, IN
February 9, 2011; 7:35 pm, BTN		No. 13 Wisconsin	L 59–62 ^{OT}	10–14 (3–9)	Carver-Hawkeye Arena (12,093); Iowa City, IA
February 13, 2011; 5:05 pm, BTN		Minnesota	L 45–62	10–15 (3–10)	Carver-Hawkeye Arena (12,759); Iowa City, IA
February 17, 2011; 8:05 pm, BTN		at Northwestern	L 70–73	10–16 (3–11)	Welsh-Ryan Arena (5,124); Evanston, IL
February 19, 2011; 3:35 pm, BTN		Michigan	L 72–75 ^{OT}	10–17 (3–12)	Carver-Hawkeye Arena (13,835); Iowa City, IA
February 26, 2011; 6:05 pm, BTN		at Illinois	L 68–81	10–18 (3–13)	Assembly Hall (16,618); Champaign, IL
March 2, 2011; 5:35 pm, BTN		at Michigan State	L 66–85	10–19 (3–14)	Breslin Center (14,797); East Lansing, MI
March 5, 2011; 3:00 pm, ESPN		No. 6 Purdue	W 67–65	11–19 (4–14)	Carver-Hawkeye Arena (12,132); Iowa City, IA
Big Ten tournament
March 10, 2011; 4:00 pm, ESPN2	(10)	vs. (7) Michigan State; Big Ten First Round	L 61–66	11–20	Conseco Fieldhouse (16,264); Indianapolis, IN
*Non-conference game. ^{#}Rankings from AP Poll. (#) Tournament seedings in parentheses.
