= 2010–11 Indiana Hoosiers men's basketball team =

American college basketball season

2010–11 Indiana Hoosiers men's basketball
- Conference: Big Ten Conference
- Record: 12–20 (3–15, 11th Big Ten)
- Head coach: Tom Crean (3rd season)
- Assistant coaches: Tim Buckley (3rd season); Bennie Seltzer (3rd season); Steve McClain (1st season)
- Home arena: Assembly Hall

2010–11 Big Ten Conference men's basketball standings
	Conf.				Overall
Team	W		L	PCT	W		L	PCT
No. 1 Ohio State †	16	–	2	.889	34	–	3	.919
No. 13 Purdue	14	–	4	.778	26	–	8	.765
No. 16 Wisconsin	13	–	5	.722	25	–	9	.735
Michigan	9	–	9	.500	21	–	14	.600
Illinois	9	–	9	.500	20	–	14	.588
Penn State	9	–	9	.500	19	–	15	.559
Michigan State	9	–	9	.500	19	–	15	.559
Northwestern	7	–	11	.389	20	–	14	.588
Minnesota	6	–	12	.333	17	–	14	.548
Iowa	4	–	14	.222	11	–	20	.355
Indiana	3	–	15	.167	12	–	20	.375
† 2011 Big Ten tournament winner Rankings from AP poll

The 2010–11 Indiana Hoosiers men's basketball team represented Indiana University in the 2010–11 college basketball season. Their head coach was Tom Crean, in his third season with the Hoosiers. The team played its home games at the Assembly Hall in Bloomington, Indiana, and was a member of the Big Ten Conference. They finished the season 12–20, 3–15 in Big Ten play to finish in 11th place, and lost in the first round of the Big Ten tournament to Penn State.

== 2010–11 roster ==
No.	Name	Position	Ht.	Wt.	Year	Hometown/high school
0	Kory Barnett	F	6–5	195	Jr.	Rochester, Indiana / Rochester High School
1	Jordan Hulls	G	6–0	172	So.	Bloomington, Indiana / Bloomington High School South
2	Christian Watford	F	6–8	230	So.	Birmingham, Alabama / Shades Valley High School
3	Maurice Creek	G	6–5	200	So.	Oxon Hill, Maryland / Hargrave Military Academy
4	Victor Oladipo	G	6–5	210	Fr.	Hyattsville, Maryland / DeMatha High School
5	Jeremiah Rivers	G	6–5	214	Sr.	Winter Park, Florida / Georgetown University
10	Will Sheehey	G/F	6–6	195	Fr.	Stuart, Florida / The Sagemont School
11	Daniel Moore	G	5–10	170	Jr.	Carmel, Indiana / Carmel High School
12	Verdell Jones III	G	6–5	185	Jr.	Champaign, Illinois / Champaign Central High School
15	Guy-Marc Michel	C	7–0	277	Jr.	Sainte-Marie, Martinique / North Idaho College
23	Bobby Capobianco	F	6–9	235	So.	Loveland, Ohio / Loveland High School
24	Jeff Howard	F	6–8	225	Fr.	Westfield, Indiana / Westfield High School
25	Tom Pritchard	F	6–9	250	Jr.	Westlake, Ohio / St. Edward High School
30	Matt Roth	G	6–3	192	Jr.	Washington, Illinois / Washington Community High School
32	Derek Elston	F	6–9	235	So.	Tipton, Indiana / Tipton High School

== Recruiting class ==
College recruiting
Name	Hometown	School	Height	Weight	Commit date
Victor Oladipo; SG	Hyattsville, MD	DeMatha	6 ft 4 in (1.93 m)	180 lb (82 kg)	Sep 7, 2009
Victor Oladipo; SG	Recruit ratings: Scout: Rivals: (90)				
Will Sheehey; SG	Stuart, FL	Sagemont	6 ft 5 in (1.96 m)	190 lb (86 kg)	Nov 16, 2009
Will Sheehey; SG	Recruit ratings: Scout: Rivals: (90)				
Overall recruit ranking:
Note: In many cases, Scout, Rivals, 247Sports, On3, and ESPN may conflict in their listings of height and weight.; In these cases, the average was taken. ESPN grades are on a 100-point scale.; Sources: "2010 Team Ranking". Rivals.

== Schedule and results ==
Date time, TV	Rank^{#}	Opponent^{#}	Result	Record	Site (attendance) city, state
Exhibition
11/3/2010*; 7:00pm		Franklin (IN)	W 89–37		Assembly Hall; Bloomington, IN
11/8/2010*; 7:00pm		Ferris State	W 78–65 ^{OT}		Assembly Hall; Bloomington, IN
Regular season
11/12/2010*; 6:30pm, BTN		Florida Gulf Coast	W 88–60	1–0	Assembly Hall (15,478); Bloomington, IN
11/14/2010*; 7:00pm, ESPNU		Wright State	W 67–44	2–0	Assembly Hall (15,261); Bloomington, IN
11/16/2010*; 7:00pm, BTN		Mississippi Valley State	W 71–54	3–0	Assembly Hall (15,540); Bloomington, IN
11/21/2010*; 1:00pm, BTN		Evansville	W 67–54	4–0	Assembly Hall (16,251); Bloomington, IN
11/23/2010*; 7:00pm, BTN		North Carolina Central	W 72–56	5–0	Assembly Hall (11,183); Bloomington, IN
11/26/2010*; 7:30pm		Northwestern State	W 100–66	6–0	Assembly Hall (12,816); Bloomington, IN
12/01/2010*; 7:15pm, ESPNU		at Boston College; ACC – Big Ten Challenge	L 76–88	6–1	Conte Forum (5,329); Chestnut Hill, MA
12/04/2010*; 6:00pm, ESPNU		Savannah State	W 79–57	7–1	Assembly Hall (15,837); Bloomington, IN
12/11/2010*; 5:15pm, ESPN		at No. 17 Kentucky	L 62–81	7–2	Rupp Arena (24,337); Lexington, KY
12/17/2010*; 7:00pm, BTN		SIU Edwardsville; IBN Las Vegas Classic	W 88–54	8–2	Assembly Hall (11,908); Bloomington, IN
12/19/2010*; 4:00pm, BTN		South Carolina State; IBN Las Vegas Classic	W 102–60	9–2	Assembly Hall (12,795); Bloomington, IN
12/22/2010*; 7:30pm, CBSCS		vs. Northern Iowa; IBN Las Vegas Classic	L 61–67	9–3	Orleans Arena (2,867); Paradise, NV
12/23/2010*; 7:30pm, CBSCS		vs. Colorado; IBN Las Vegas Classic	L 69–78	9–4	Orleans Arena (2,867); Paradise, NV
12/27/2010; 6:30pm, BTN		Penn State	L 60–69	9–5 (0–1)	Assembly Hall (14,952); Bloomington, IN
12/31/2010; 6:00pm, ESPN2		No. 2 Ohio State	L 67–85	9–6 (0–2)	Assembly Hall (14,883); Bloomington, IN
1/04/2011; 7:00 p.m., ESPN2		at No. 21 Minnesota	L 63–67	9–7 (0–3)	Williams Arena (12,727); Minneapolis, MN
1/09/2011; 7:00 p.m., BTN		at Northwestern	L 81–93	9–8 (0–4)	Welsh-Ryan Arena (6,719); Evanston, IL
1/15/2011; 8:00pm, BTN		Michigan	W 80–61	10–8 (1–4)	Assembly Hall (17,168); Bloomington, IN
1/20/2011; 9:00pm, ESPN		at No. 18 Wisconsin	L 60–69	10–9 (1–5)	Kohl Center (17,230); Madison, WI
1/23/2011; 3:00pm, BTN		at Iowa	L 77–91	10–10 (1–6)	Carver–Hawkeye Arena (11,860); Iowa City, IA
1/27/2011; 9:00pm, BTN		No. 20 Illinois; Rivalry	W 52–49	11–10 (2–6)	Assembly Hall (16,297); Bloomington, IN
1/30/2011; 6:00pm, BTN		at No. 25 Michigan State	L 83–84 ^{OT}	11–11 (2–7)	Breslin Center (14,797); East Lansing, MI
2/02/2011; 6:30pm, BTN		No. 18 Minnesota	W 60–57	12–11 (3–7)	Assembly Hall (16,168); Bloomington, IN
2/05/2011; 4:00pm, ESPN2		Iowa	L 63–64	12–12 (3–8)	Assembly Hall (17,225); Bloomington, IN
2/08/2011; 7:00pm, ESPN		at No. 14 Purdue; Rivalry/Crimson and Gold Cup	L 53–67	12–13 (3–9)	Mackey Arena (14,123); West Lafayette, IN
2/12/2011; 4:00pm, BTN		at Michigan	L 69–73	12–14 (3–10)	Crisler Arena (13,751); Ann Arbor, MI
2/19/2011; 7:00pm, BTN		Northwestern	L 64–70	12–15 (3–11)	Assembly Hall (17,169); Bloomington, IN
2/23/2011; 8:30pm, BTN		No. 8 Purdue; Rivalry/Crimson and Gold Cup	L 61–72	12–16 (3–12)	Assembly Hall (17,032); Bloomington, IN
2/27/2011; 4:00pm, CBS		at No. 2 Ohio State	L 61–82	12–17 (3–13)	Jerome Schottenstein Center (18,809); Columbus, OH
3/03/2011; 9:00pm, ESPN		No. 10 Wisconsin	L 67–77	12–18 (3–14)	Assembly Hall (16,700); Bloomington, IN
3/05/2011; 12:00pm, BTN		at Illinois; Rivalry	L 48–72	12–19 (3–15)	Assembly Hall (16,618); Champaign, IL
Big Ten tournament
3/10/2011; 7:30pm, BTN	(11)	vs. (6) Penn State; Big Ten First Round	L 55–61	12–20	Conseco Fieldhouse (16,264); Indianapolis, IN
*Non-conference game. ^{#}Rankings from AP Poll. (#) Tournament seedings in parentheses.
