= 2010–11 Purdue Boilermakers men's basketball team =

American college basketball season

2010–11 Purdue Boilermakers men's basketball

NCAA tournament, Round of 32
- Conference: Big Ten Conference

Ranking
- Coaches: No. 17
- AP: No. 13
- Record: 26–8 (14–4 Big Ten)
- Head coach: Matt Painter (6th Season)
- Assistant coaches: Paul Lusk; Jack Owens; Mike Jackson
- Home arena: Mackey Arena

2010–11 Big Ten Conference men's basketball standings
	Conf.				Overall
Team	W		L	PCT	W		L	PCT
No. 1 Ohio State †	16	–	2	.889	34	–	3	.919
No. 13 Purdue	14	–	4	.778	26	–	8	.765
No. 16 Wisconsin	13	–	5	.722	25	–	9	.735
Michigan	9	–	9	.500	21	–	14	.600
Illinois	9	–	9	.500	20	–	14	.588
Penn State	9	–	9	.500	19	–	15	.559
Michigan State	9	–	9	.500	19	–	15	.559
Northwestern	7	–	11	.389	20	–	14	.588
Minnesota	6	–	12	.333	17	–	14	.548
Iowa	4	–	14	.222	11	–	20	.355
Indiana	3	–	15	.167	12	–	20	.375
† 2011 Big Ten tournament winner Rankings from AP poll

The 2010–11 Purdue Boilermakers men's basketball team represented Purdue University. The head coach was Matt Painter, in his sixth season with the Boilers. The team played its home games in Mackey Arena in West Lafayette, Indiana, and was a member of the Big Ten Conference.

Purdue finished the season 26–8, 14–4 in Big Ten play to finish in second place. As the No. 2 seed in the Big Ten tournament, they lost to Michigan State in the quarterfinals. They received a bid to the NCAA tournament as No. 3 seed in the Southwest Region. They defeated Saint Peter's in the Second Round before losing to eventual Final Four participant VCU in the Third Round.

== Season notes ==
- After initially entering their names into the 2010 NBA draft, both E'Twaun Moore and JaJuan Johnson removed their names from consideration on May 8, 2010, and announced their intentions to return for their senior seasons.
- On October 4, 2010, Robbie Hummel, Moore, and Johnson were named to the John R. Wooden Award Pre-Season watch list. Purdue was the only school with three individuals recognized on the list of 50 possible candidates.
- On October 16, Hummel re-tore the same ACL that he had injured the previous season during team practice and will miss the season. Hummel has stated that he plans to take a medical redshirt and prepare for the 2011–12 season.
- Johnson was named a Preseason First-Team All-American by the Associated Press and ESPN.
- Both Moore and Johnson were named to the Preseason First-Team All-Big Ten Team.
- Junior John Hart received a fracture in his foot in early December. He returned against West Virginia on January 16.
- E'Twaun Moore became the program's career record holder for minutes played, three point field goals made, and most starts.
- E'Twaun Moore scored a career high 38 points against Ohio State, the most points in a game by a Boiler since Glenn Robinson in 1994.
- E'Twaun Moore scored his 2,000th career point against Ohio State on February 20, 2011.
- JaJuan Johnson scored a career high 31 points against Indiana State.
- E'Twaun Moore made a career high 7 three-point field goals multiple times against Northwestern and Ohio State.
- Junior Ryne Smith was named Big Ten Co-Player of the Week, averaging 19 points and shooting 11–14 beyond the arc in wins against Penn State and Iowa.
- JaJuan Johnson was named a Sporting News Midseason First-Team All-American
- Purdue defeated back-to-back top ten teams at home for the first time in school history (#10 Wisconsin, #2 Ohio State)
- JaJuan Johnson tied a career high 7 blocks against Michigan State on February 27, 2011. In the same contest, he tallied a career high 17 rebounds.
- Purdue went undefeated at home, going 16–0, for the first time since the 1968–1969 season.
- At the conclusion of the regular season, JaJuan Johnson was named the Big Ten Conference Player of the Year, as well as the Big Ten Conference Defensive Player of the Year.
- Matt Painter was named consecutive Big Ten Conference Coach of the Year honors.
- E'Twaun Moore was named First Team-All Big Ten for consecutive seasons.
- Kelsey Barlow was suspended on March 15, three days before the Boilermakers played their second-round game against St. Peter's.

== Roster ==
2010–11 Purdue Boilermakers men's basketball team
Players
Coaches

Pos.	#	Name	Height	Weight	Year	Hometown
G	0	Terone Johnson	6 ft 2 in (1.88 m)	211 lb (96 kg)	Fr	Indianapolis, IN
G	1	Anthony Johnson (redshirt)	6 ft 3 in (1.91 m)	175 lb (79 kg)	Fr	Chicago, IL
PG	2	Bubba Day	6 ft 0 in (1.83 m)	195 lb (88 kg)	Jr	West Lafayette, IN
F	4	Robbie Hummel (injured) (redshirt)	6 ft 8 in (2.03 m)	228 lb (103 kg)	Sr	Valparaiso, IN
G	12	Kelsey Barlow (S)	6 ft 5 in (1.96 m)	193 lb (88 kg)	So	Indianapolis, IN
G	14	Dru Anthrop	6 ft 0 in (1.83 m)	175 lb (79 kg)	So	Lafayette, IN
G	21	DJ Byrd	6 ft 5 in (1.96 m)	225 lb (102 kg)	So	Crawfordsville, IN
G	23	Lewis Jackson	5 ft 9 in (1.75 m)	165 lb (75 kg)	Jr	Decatur, IL
G	24	Ryne Smith	6 ft 3 in (1.91 m)	190 lb (86 kg)	Jr	Toledo, OH
F/C	25	JaJuan Johnson	6 ft 10 in (2.08 m)	221 lb (100 kg)	Sr	Indianapolis, IN
G	32	John Hart	6 ft 2 in (1.88 m)	196 lb (89 kg)	RS So	Beech Grove, IN
G	33	E'Twaun Moore	6 ft 3 in (1.91 m)	191 lb (87 kg)	Sr	East Chicago, IN
F	41	Patrick Bade	6 ft 8 in (2.03 m)	229 lb (104 kg)	So	Indianapolis, IN
C	50	Travis Carroll	6 ft 9 in (2.06 m)	230 lb (104 kg)	Fr	Danville, IN
F	55	Aleksandar Marcius	6 ft 9 in (2.06 m)	257 lb (117 kg)	RS Fr	Nedelisce, Croatia

Head coach

Matt Painter (Purdue)

Assistant coach(es)

Paul Lusk (Southern Illinois)
Jack Owens (Eastern Illinois)
Mike Jackson (Detroit Mercy)

Legend

- (C) Team captain
- (S) Suspended
- (I) Ineligible
- (W) Walk-on
- Injured
- Current redshirt

Roster
Last update: 2010-05-09

=== Incoming recruits ===
College recruiting information
Name	Hometown	School	Height	Weight	Commit date
Anthony Johnson; SG	Chicago, IL	Whitney Young Magnet High School	6 ft 3 in (1.91 m)	175 lb (79 kg)	Oct 6, 2008
Anthony Johnson; SG	Recruit ratings: Scout: Rivals: (89)				
Terone Johnson; PG	Indianapolis, IN	North Central High School	6 ft 2 in (1.88 m)	180 lb (82 kg)	Sep 21, 2008
Terone Johnson; PG	Recruit ratings: Scout: Rivals: (92)				
Travis Carroll; C	Danville, IN	Danville Community High School	6 ft 9 in (2.06 m)	210 lb (95 kg)	Jun 21, 2008
Travis Carroll; C	Recruit ratings: Scout: Rivals: (93)				
Overall recruit ranking: Rivals: #9 ESPN: #9
Note: In many cases, Scout, Rivals, 247Sports, On3, and ESPN may conflict in their listings of height and weight.; In these cases, the average was taken. ESPN grades are on a 100-point scale.; Sources: "2010 Purdue Signees". Rivals.; "2010 Purdue Signees". Scout.; "2010 Purdue Signees". ESPN.; "Scout.com Team Recruiting Rankings". Scout.; "2010 Team Ranking". Rivals.

== Schedule and results ==
Date time, TV	Rank^{#}	Opponent^{#}	Result	Record	Site (attendance) city, state
Exhibition
November 2*; 7:00 pm, BTN	No. 14	Indianapolis	W 83–59	—	Mackey Arena; West Lafayette, IN
November 9*; 7:00 pm, BTN	No. 14	Midwestern State	W 78–58	—	Mackey Arena; West Lafayette, IN
Regular season
November 14*; 5:00 pm, BTN	No. 14	Howard	W 76–40	1–0	Mackey Arena (14,123); West Lafayette, IN
November 17*; 7:00 pm, BTN	No. 14	Alcorn State	W 103–48	2–0	Mackey Arena (14,123); West Lafayette, IN
November 21*; 7:00 pm, BTN	No. 14	Oakland; Chicago Invitational Challenge	W 82–67	3–0	Mackey Arena (14,123); West Lafayette, IN
November 23*; 7:00 pm, ESPN3	No. 10	Austin Peay; Chicago Invitational Challenge	W 87–65	4–0	Mackey Arena (14,123); West Lafayette, IN
November 26*; 8:30 pm, BTN	No. 10	vs. Southern Illinois; Chicago Invitational Challenge	W 79–60	5–0	Sears Centre (3,392); Hoffman Estates, IL
November 27*; 8:30 pm, BTN	No. 10	vs. Richmond; Chicago Invitational Challenge	L 54–65	5–1	Sears Centre (2,832); Hoffman Estates, IL
December 1*; 7:30 pm, ESPN	No. 22	at Virginia Tech; ACC-Big Ten Challenge	W 58–55 ^{OT}	6–1	Cassell Coliseum (9,847); Blacksburg, VA
December 4*; 3:30 pm, ESPN2	No. 22	Alabama	W 66–47	7–1	Mackey Arena (14,123); West Lafayette, IN
December 7*; 9:00 pm, ESPNU	No. 19	at Valparaiso	W 76–58	8–1	Athletics–Recreation Center (5,432); Valparaiso, IN
December 11*; 6:30 pm, BTN	No. 19	North Florida	W 77–57	9–1	Mackey Arena (14,123); West Lafayette, IN
December 18*; 4:00 pm, BTN	No. 19	vs. Indiana State; Boilermaker Blockbuster	W 65–52	10–1	Conseco Fieldhouse (7,666); Indianapolis, IN
December 21*; 6:30 pm, BTN	No. 14	IPFW	W 77–52	11–1	Mackey Arena (11,148); West Lafayette, IN
December 28; 2:00 pm, BTN	No. 12	at Michigan	W 80–57	12–1 (1–0)	Crisler Arena (13,751); Ann Arbor, MI
December 31; 12:00 pm, ESPN2	No. 12	Northwestern	W 82–69	13–1 (2–0)	Mackey Arena (13,789); West Lafayette, IN
January 5; 6:30 pm, BTN	No. 11	at Penn State	W 83–68	14–1 (3–0)	Bryce Jordan Center (5,342); State College, PA
January 9; 12:00 pm, BTN	No. 11	Iowa	W 75–52	15–1 (4–0)	Mackey Arena (14,123); West Lafayette, IN
January 13; 7:00 pm, ESPN	No. 8	at Minnesota	L 67–70	15–2 (4–1)	Williams Arena (14,625); Minneapolis, MN
January 16*; 1:30 pm, CBS	No. 8	at West Virginia	L 64–68	15–3	WVU Coliseum (14,173); Morgantown, WV
January 19; 8:30 pm, BTN	No. 14	Penn State	W 63–62	16–3 (5–1)	Mackey Arena (14,123); West Lafayette, IN
January 22; 9:00 pm, ESPN	No. 14	No. 17 Michigan State; ESPN College GameDay	W 86–76	17–3 (6–1)	Mackey Arena (14,123); West Lafayette, IN
January 25; 9:00 pm, ESPN	No. 12	at No. 1 Ohio State	L 67–87	17–4 (6–2)	Jerome Schottenstein Center (17,556); Columbus, OH
January 29; 1:00 pm, CBS	No. 12	No. 16 Minnesota	W 73–61	18–4 (7–2)	Mackey Arena (14,123); West Lafayette, IN
February 1; 7:00 pm, ESPN	No. 11	at No. 19 Wisconsin	L 59–66	18–5 (7–3)	Kohl Center (17,230); Madison, WI
February 8; 7:00 pm, ESPN	No. 14	Indiana	W 67–53	19–5 (8–3)	Mackey Arena (14,123); West Lafayette, IN
February 13; 1:00 pm, CBS	No. 14	at Illinois	W 81–70	20–5 (9–3)	Assembly Hall (16,618); Champaign, IL
February 16; 6:30 pm, BTN	No. 11	No. 10 Wisconsin	W 70–62	21–5 (10–3)	Mackey Arena (14,123); West Lafayette, IN
February 20; 1:00 pm, CBS	No. 11	No. 2 Ohio State	W 76–63	22–5 (11–3)	Mackey Arena (14,123); West Lafayette, IN
February 23; 8:30 pm, BTN	No. 8	at Indiana	W 72–61	23–5 (12–3)	Assembly Hall (17,032); Bloomington, IN
February 27; 1:00 pm, ESPN	No. 8	at Michigan State	W 67–47	24–5 (13–3)	Breslin Student Events Center (14,797); East Lansing, MI
March 1; 7:00 pm, ESPN	No. 6	Illinois	W 75–67	25–5 (14–3)	Mackey Arena (14,123); West Lafayette, IN
March 5; 4:00 pm, ESPN	No. 6	at Iowa	L 65–67	25–6 (14–4)	Carver-Hawkeye Arena (12,132); Iowa City, IA
Big Ten tournament
March 11; 6:30 pm, BTN	(2) No. 9	vs. (7) Michigan State; Big Ten Quarterfinals	L 56–74	25–7	Conseco Fieldhouse; Indianapolis, IN
NCAA tournament
March 18*; 7:20 pm, TNT	(3 SW) No. 13	vs. (14 SW) Saint Peter's; NCAA Second Round	W 65–43	26–7	United Center; Chicago, IL
March 20*; 7:10 pm, TBS	(3 SW) No. 13	vs. (11 SW) VCU; NCAA Third Round	L 76–94	26–8	United Center; Chicago, IL
*Non-conference game. ^{#}Rankings from AP Poll. (#) Tournament seedings in parentheses. SW=NCAA Southwest Regional. All times are in Eastern Time.

== Rankings ==
Poll	Preseason	Wk 1	Wk 2	Wk 3	Wk 4	Wk 5	Wk 6	Wk 7	Wk 8	Wk 9	Wk 10	Wk 11	Wk 12	Wk 13	Wk 14	Wk 15	Wk 16	Wk 17	Postseason	Final
AP	14	14	10	22	19	19	14	12	11	8	14	12	11	14	11	8	6	9	13	
Coaches	8	9	8	18	18	17	13	11	10	8	13	12	10	12	11	8	6	9	15	17

== 2011 Signing Class ==
The 2011 recruiting class was weak compared to Purdue's recent history recruiting. The class brought in two power forwards. Donnie Hale was ranked the #25 power forward in this recruiting class. Hale committed to Purdue June 23, 2009. He transferred his sophomore year to the Bellarmine Knights. Jacob Lawson was the #31 ranked power forward. He committed to Purdue on April 28, 2011.

College recruiting information
Name	Hometown	School	Height	Weight	Commit date
Donnie Hale; PF	New Albany, IN	New Albany Senior High School	6 ft 7 in (2.01 m)	190 lb (86 kg)	Jun 23, 2009
Donnie Hale; PF	Recruit ratings: Scout: Rivals: (91)				
Jacob Lawson; PF	Greensboro, NC	Oak Ridge Military Academy	6 ft 7 in (2.01 m)	200 lb (91 kg)	Sep 2, 2010
Jacob Lawson; PF	Recruit ratings: Scout: Rivals: (91)				
Overall recruit ranking:
Note: In many cases, Scout, Rivals, 247Sports, On3, and ESPN may conflict in their listings of height and weight.; In these cases, the average was taken. ESPN grades are on a 100-point scale.; Sources: "2011 Purdue Signees". Rivals.; "2011 Purdue Signees". Scout.; "2011 Purdue Signees". ESPN.; "Scout.com Team Recruiting Rankings". Scout.; "2011 Team Ranking". Rivals.

== See also ==
- 2011 NCAA Division I men's basketball tournament
- 2010-11 NCAA Division I men's basketball season
- 2010-11 NCAA Division I men's basketball rankings
- List of NCAA Division I institutions
