= 2010–11 Northwestern Wildcats men's basketball team =

American college basketball season

2010–11 Northwestern Wildcats men's basketball

NIT, Quarterfinals
- Conference: Big Ten Conference
- Record: 20–14 (7–11 Big Ten)
- Head coach: Bill Carmody
- Assistant coaches: Mitch Henderson; Tavaras Hardy; Ivan Vujic
- Home arena: Welsh-Ryan Arena

2010–11 Big Ten Conference men's basketball standings
	Conf.				Overall
Team	W		L	PCT	W		L	PCT
No. 1 Ohio State †	16	–	2	.889	34	–	3	.919
No. 13 Purdue	14	–	4	.778	26	–	8	.765
No. 16 Wisconsin	13	–	5	.722	25	–	9	.735
Michigan	9	–	9	.500	21	–	14	.600
Illinois	9	–	9	.500	20	–	14	.588
Penn State	9	–	9	.500	19	–	15	.559
Michigan State	9	–	9	.500	19	–	15	.559
Northwestern	7	–	11	.389	20	–	14	.588
Minnesota	6	–	12	.333	17	–	14	.548
Iowa	4	–	14	.222	11	–	20	.355
Indiana	3	–	15	.167	12	–	20	.375
† 2011 Big Ten tournament winner Rankings from AP poll

The 2010–11 Northwestern Wildcats men's basketball team represented Northwestern University in the 2010–11 college basketball season. This is head coach Bill Carmody's eleventh season at the Northwestern. The Wildcats were members of the Big Ten Conference and played their home games at Welsh-Ryan Arena. In the previous year, they finished the season 20–14, 7–10 in Big Ten play, lost in the quarterfinals of the 2010 Big Ten Conference men's basketball tournament and were invited to the 2010 National Invitation Tournament where they lost in the quarterfinals to Washington State.

== 2010–11 Roster ==
No.	Name	Position	Ht.	Wt.	Year	Hometown/High School
1	Crawford, Drew	G/F	6–5	205	SO	Naperville, Illinois/Naperville Central
3	Capocci, Mike	F	6–6	195	SR	Lombard, Illinois/Glenbard East
4	Marcotullio, Alex	G	6–3	180	SO	Warren, Michigan/De La Salle
5	Ryan, Jeff	G/F	6–7	205	SR	Glenview, Illinois/Glenbrook South
10	Nichols, Austin	G	6–0	192	SO	Lansing, Michigan/Lansing Catholic
11	Hearn, Reggie	G	6–4	205	SO	Fort Wayne, Indiana/Snider
12	Mirković, Luka	F/C	6–11	248	JR	Belgrade, Serbia/La Lumiere (LaPorte, Ind.)
15	Fruendt, Nick	G	6–5	200	JR	Batavia, Illinois/Batavia
21	Peljusic, Ivan	F	6–8	220	SR	Zadar, Croatia/V. Nazor Gymnasium
22	Thompson, Michael	G	5–10	190	SR	Chicago, Illinois/Lincoln Park
23	Cobb, JerShon	G	6–5	180	FR	Decatur, Georgia/Columbia
24	Shurna, John	F	6–8	215	JR	Glen Ellyn, Illinois/Glenbard West
30	Curletti, Davide	F	6–9	238	JR	Farmington Hills, Michigan/Orchard Lake St. Mary's

== Schedule and results ==
Date time, TV	Rank^{#}	Opponent^{#}	Result	Record	Site city, state
Exhibition
Thu, Nov 4*; 7:00 pm		Robert Morris	W 91–71	—	Welsh-Ryan Arena; Evanston, IL
Regular season
Fri, Nov 12*; 8:00 pm		at Northern Illinois	W 97–78	1–0	Convocation Center; DeKalb, IL
Wed, Nov 17*; 7:00 pm		at Texas–Pan American	W 77–71	2–0	UTPA Fieldhouse; Edinburg, TX
Fri, Nov 19*; 7:00 pm		Arkansas–Pine Bluff	W 71–45	3–0	Welsh-Ryan Arena; Evanston, IL
Sun, Nov 28*; 7:30 pm, BTN		Creighton	W 65–52	4–0	Welsh-Ryan Arena; Evanston, IL
Tue, Nov 30*; 6:00 pm, ESPN2		Georgia Tech; ACC–Big Ten Challenge	W 91–71	5–0	Welsh-Ryan Arena; Evanston, IL
Mon, Dec 13*; 7:00 pm		Long Island	W 81–65	6–0	Welsh-Ryan Arena; Evanston, IL
Thu, Dec 16*; 7:00 pm, BTN		American	W 78–62	7–0	Welsh-Ryan Arena; Evanston, IL
Mon, Dec 20*; 6:00 pm, MSG		vs. St. Francis Brooklyn; Madison Square Garden Holiday Festival	W 92–61	8–0	Madison Square Garden; New York City, NY
Tue, Dec 21*; 8:30 pm, MSG		vs. St. John's; Madison Square Garden Holiday Festival	L 69–85	8–1	Madison Square Garden; New York City, NY
Thu, Dec 23*; 2:00 pm		Mount St. Mary's	W 70–47	9–1	Welsh-Ryan Arena; Evanston, IL
Fri, Dec 31; 11:00 am, ESPN2		at No. 12 Purdue	L 69–82	9–2 (0–1)	Mackey Arena; West Lafayette, IN
Mon, Jan 03; 6:30 pm, BTN		No. 18 Michigan State	L 62–65	9–3 (0–2)	Welsh-Ryan Arena; Evanston, IL
Thu, Jan 06; 8:00 pm, BTN		at No. 20 Illinois	L 63–88	9–4 (0–3)	Assembly Hall; Champaign, IL
Sun, Jan 09; 6:00 pm, BTN		Indiana	W 93–81	10–4 (1–3)	Welsh-Ryan Arena; Evanston, IL
Wed, Jan 12; 7:30 pm, BTN		at Iowa	W 90–71	11–4 (2–3)	Carver-Hawkeye Arena; Iowa City, IA
Sat, Jan 15; 12:00 pm, BTN		at Michigan State	L 67–71 ^{OT}	11–5 (2–4)	Breslin Center; East Lansing, MI
Tue, Jan 18; 8:00pm, BTN		Michigan	W 74–60	12–5 (3–4)	Welsh-Ryan Arena; Evanston, IL
Thu, Jan 20*; 5:30pm		SIU Edwardsville	W 98–55	13–5	Welsh-Ryan Arena; Evanston, IL
Sun, Jan 23; 11:30 am, BTN		Wisconsin	L 46–78	13–6 (3–5)	Welsh-Ryan Arena; Evanston, IL
Wed, Jan 26; 7:30 pm, BTN		at No. 16 Minnesota	L 70–81	13–7 (3–6)	Williams Arena; Minneapolis, MN
Sat, Jan 29; 5:00pm, ESPN2		No. 1 Ohio State	L 57-58	13–8 (3–7)	Welsh-Ryan Arena; Evanston, IL
Sat, Feb 05; 12:00 pm, CBS		Illinois	W 71–70	14–8 (4–7)	Welsh-Ryan Arena; Evanston, IL
Wed, Feb 09; 5:30 pm, BTN		at Michigan	L 66–75	14–9 (4–8)	Crisler Arena; Ann Arbor, MI
Sun, Feb 13; 2:30 pm, BTN		at Penn State	L 41–65	14–10 (4–9)	Bryce Jordan Center; University Park, PA
Thu, Feb 17; 8:00 pm, BTN		Iowa	W 73–70	15–10 (5–9)	Welsh-Ryan Arena; Evanston, IL
Sat, Feb 19; 6:00 pm, BTN		at Indiana	W 70–64	16–10 (6–9)	Assembly Hall; Bloomington, IN
Thu, Feb 24; 8:00 pm, ESPN2		Penn State	L 52–66	16–11 (6–10)	Welsh-Ryan Arena; Evanston, IL
Sun, Feb 27; 5:00pm, BTN		at No. 12 Wisconsin	L 63–78	16–12 (6–11)	Kohl Center; Madison, WI
Wed, Mar 2; 7:30 pm, BTN		Minnesota	W 68–57	17–12 (7–11)	Welsh-Ryan Arena; Evanston, IL
Big Ten tournament
Thu, Mar 10; 1:30 pm, ESPN2	(8)	vs. (9) Minnesota; Big Ten First Round	W 75–65	18–12	Conseco Fieldhouse; Indianapolis, IN
Fri, Mar 11; 11:00 am, ESPN	(8)	vs. (1) No. 1 Ohio State; Quarterfinals	L 61–67 ^{OT}	18–13	Conseco Fieldhouse; Indianapolis, IN
NIT
Wed, Mar 16*; 7:00pm, ESPN3	(4 BC)	(5 BC) Milwaukee; NIT First Round	W 70–61	19–13	Welsh-Ryan Arena; Evanston, IL
Sat, Mar 19*; 10:00 am, ESPN	(4 BC)	at (1 BC) Boston College; NIT Second Round	W 85–67	20–13	Conte Forum; Chestnut Hill, MA
Wed, Mar 23*; 8:00 pm, ESPN2	(4 BC)	at (2 BC) Washington State; NIT Quarterfinals	L 66–69 ^{OT}	20–14	Beasley Coliseum; Pullman, WA
*Non-conference game. ^{#}Rankings from AP Poll. (#) Tournament seedings in parentheses. BC=NIT Boston College bracket. All times are in Central.
