= 2010–11 Illinois Fighting Illini men's basketball team =

American college basketball season

2010–11 Illinois Fighting Illini men's basketball

NCAA tournament, Round of 32
- Conference: Big Ten Conference
- Record: 20–14 (9–9 Big Ten)
- Head coach: Bruce Weber (8th season)
- Assistant coaches: Wayne McClain (10th season); Jay Price (8th season); Jerrance Howard (4th season)
- MVP: Mike Davis
- Captains: Bill Cole; Demetri McCamey; Mike Tisdale
- Home arena: Assembly Hall

2010–11 Big Ten Conference men's basketball standings
	Conf.				Overall
Team	W		L	PCT	W		L	PCT
No. 1 Ohio State †	16	–	2	.889	34	–	3	.919
No. 13 Purdue	14	–	4	.778	26	–	8	.765
No. 16 Wisconsin	13	–	5	.722	25	–	9	.735
Michigan	9	–	9	.500	21	–	14	.600
Illinois	9	–	9	.500	20	–	14	.588
Penn State	9	–	9	.500	19	–	15	.559
Michigan State	9	–	9	.500	19	–	15	.559
Northwestern	7	–	11	.389	20	–	14	.588
Minnesota	6	–	12	.333	17	–	14	.548
Iowa	4	–	14	.222	11	–	20	.355
Indiana	3	–	15	.167	12	–	20	.375
† 2011 Big Ten tournament winner Rankings from AP poll

The 2010–11 Illinois Fighting Illini men's basketball team represented the University of Illinois at Urbana–Champaign in the 2010–11 NCAA Division I men's basketball season. This was head coach Bruce Weber's eighth season at Illinois. They played their home games at Assembly Hall and were members of the Big Ten Conference. They finished the season 20–14, 9–9 in Big Ten play and lost in the quarterfinals of the 2011 Big Ten Conference men's basketball tournament to Michigan. They received an at-large bid to the 2011 NCAA Division I men's basketball tournament, where they beat UNLV in the second round before falling to Kansas in the third round.

== Pre-season ==
Illinois welcomed back all five starters and its top seven players from the previous season. The Illini returned 89.4 percent of its points, 79 percent of its rebounds, and 85 percent of its minutes played from the 2009–10 campaign. In addition to the returning players, Illinois added a top-15 ranked recruiting class to its roster. Three true freshmen joined the squad this season: guard/forward Jereme Richmond, center Meyers Leonard, and guard Crandall Head. The 2010 recruiting class was ranked No. 11 by Scout.com and No. 13 by both Rivals.com and ESPNU. Richmond earned Illinois Mr. Basketball honors and was selected to play in the 2010 McDonald's All-American Game, becoming Illinois' 13th McDonald's All-American and first since Dee Brown. A top-25 recruit, Richmond averaged 21 points, 11.5 rebounds, three assists and three blocks as a senior. Leonard was a consensus first-team all-state selection who led Robinson High School to the 2010 Illinois state title in Class 2A. A top-50 recruit, Leonard averaged 19 points, 11 rebounds and 4.5 blocks as a senior. He is the younger brother of former Illini All-American Luther Head. Crandall missed his senior season after having surgery to repair a torn ACL. He was a top-75 recruit who earned all-state honors as a junior, averaging 21 points, seven rebounds and four steals.

=== Departures ===
Name	Number	Pos.	Height	Weight	Year	Hometown	Reason for departure
Jeffrey Jordan	13	G	6'1"	175	Junior	Highland Park, IL	Transferred to Central Florida
Bubba Chisholm	15	G	5'11"	180	Senior	Champaign, IL	Graduated
Stan Simpson	21	C	6'10"	230	RS freshman	Chicago, IL	Transferred to John A. Logan College then to Memphis
Dominique Keller	23	F	6'7"	230	Senior	Port Arthur, TX	Graduated
Alex Legion	33	G	6'5"	200	RS junior	Detroit	Transferred to Florida International
Richard Semrau	50	F	6'10"	245	RS junior	Grafton, OH	Graduated

=== 2010 additions ===
College recruiting
Name	Hometown	School	Height	Weight	Commit date
Meyers Leonard; C	Robinson, IL	Robinson High School	7 ft 0 in (2.13 m)	240 lb (110 kg)	Jul 29, 2008
Meyers Leonard; C	Recruit ratings: Scout: Rivals: (95)				
Crandall Head; SG	Chicago, IL	Crane Technical Prep	6 ft 4 in (1.93 m)	185 lb (84 kg)	Jan 4, 2008
Crandall Head; SG	Recruit ratings: Scout: Rivals: (94)				
Jereme Richmond; SF	Waukegan, IL	Waukegan High School	6 ft 7 in (2.01 m)	205 lb (93 kg)	Oct 26, 2006
Jereme Richmond; SF	Recruit ratings: Scout: Rivals: (95)				
Overall recruit ranking: Scout: 11 Rivals: 13 247Sports: 12 On3: 6
Note: In many cases, Scout, Rivals, 247Sports, On3, and ESPN may conflict in their listings of height and weight.; In these cases, the average was taken. ESPN grades are on a 100-point scale.; Sources: "Illinois Commit List for 2010". Rivals.; "Men's Basketball Recruiting". Scout.; "ESPN – Illinois Fighting Illini Basketball Recruiting 2010". ESPN.; "Scout.com Team Recruiting Rankings". Scout.; "2010 Team Ranking". Rivals.; "2010–11 Illinois Fighting Illini men's basketball team". 247Sports.; "2010–11 Illinois Fighting Illini men's basketball team". On3.

== Roster ==
2010–11 Illinois Fighting Illini men's basketball team
Players
Coaches

Pos.	#	Name	Height	Weight	Year	Previous school	Hometown
G	1	D. J. Richardson	6 ft 3 in (1.91 m)	195 lb (88 kg)	So	Central High School	Peoria, IL
G	2	Joseph Bertrand	6 ft 5 in (1.96 m)	195 lb (88 kg)	RS Fr	Sterling High School	Sterling, IL
G	3	Brandon Paul	6 ft 4 in (1.93 m)	200 lb (91 kg)	So	Warren Township High School	Gurnee, IL
G	4	Crandall Head	6 ft 4 in (1.93 m)	185 lb (84 kg)	Fr	Rich South High School	Matteson, IL
C	12	Meyers Leonard	7 ft 0 in (2.13 m)	240 lb (109 kg)	Fr	Robinson High School	Robinson, IL
G	15	Jean Selus (W)	6 ft 2 in (1.88 m)	195 lb (88 kg)	Jr	Winter Garden High School	Montreal, Quebec
G	21	Kervin Berardini	6 ft 0 in (1.83 m)	175 lb (79 kg)	RS Fr	Lake Forest High School/Loyola Marymount	Lake Forest, IL
G/F	22	Jereme Richmond	6 ft 7 in (2.01 m)	205 lb (93 kg)	Fr	Waukegan High School	Waukegan, IL
F	24	Mike Davis	6 ft 9 in (2.06 m)	225 lb (102 kg)	Sr	T. C. Williams High School	Alexandria, VA
F	30	Bill Cole (C)	6 ft 9 in (2.06 m)	215 lb (98 kg)	Sr	Richwoods High School	Peoria, IL
G	32	Demetri McCamey (C)	6 ft 3 in (1.91 m)	200 lb (91 kg)	Sr	St. Joseph High School	Bellwood, IL
F	42	Tyler Griffey	6 ft 8 in (2.03 m)	235 lb (107 kg)	So	Lafayette High School	Wildwood, MO
C	54	Mike Tisdale (C)	7 ft 1 in (2.16 m)	235 lb (107 kg)	Sr	Riverton High School	Riverton, IL

Head coach

- Bruce Weber (Milwaukee)

Assistant coach(es)

- Wayne McClain (Illinois State)
- Jay Price (Kansas)
- Jerrance Howard (Illinois)
- Gary Nottingham (Glenville State)
- Sean Harrington (Illinois)
- Chester Frazier (Illinois)

Legend

- (C) Team captain
- (S) Suspended
- (I) Ineligible
- (W) Walk-on
- Injured
- Current redshirt

Roster
Last update: 2010-10-22

== Schedule ==
Date time, TV	Rank^{#}	Opponent^{#}	Result	Record	High points	High rebounds	High assists	Site (attendance) city, state
Exhibition
Fri, Oct 29, 2010*; 7:00 pm, BTN.com		Lewis	W 75–65		15 – Davis	7 – Davis	3 – Richmond	Assembly Hall (14,737); Champaign, IL
Tue, Nov 02, 2010*; 7:00 pm, BTN.com		Southern Indiana	W 76–67		21 – Tisdale	14 – Davis	7 – McCamey	Assembly Hall (14,637); Champaign, IL
Non-conference regular season
Mon, Nov 08, 2010*; 7:00 pm, ESPN3	No. 13	UC Irvine	W 79–65	1–0	18 – Paul	8 – Davis, Tisdale	8 – McCamey	Assembly Hall (15,287); Champaign, IL
Wed, Nov 10, 2010*; 7:00 pm, ESPN3	No. 13	Toledo	W 84–45	2–0	13 – McCamey	8 – Tisdale	7 – McCamey	Assembly Hall (15,333); Champaign, IL
Sat, Nov 13, 2010*; 7:00 pm, BTN	No. 13	Southern Illinois	W 85–63	3–0	18 – McCamey	7 – Davis	9 – McCamey	Assembly Hall (16,618); Champaign, IL
Thu, Nov 18, 2010*; 8:00 pm, ESPN2	No. 13	vs. Texas; Coaches Vs. Cancer Classic	L 84–90 ^{OT}	3–1	22 – McCamey	13 – Davis	8 – McCamey	Madison Square Garden (12,210); New York, NY
Fri, Nov 19, 2010*; 4:00pm, ESPN2	No. 13	vs. Maryland; Coaches Vs. Cancer Classic	W 80–76	4–1	20 – McCamey	6 – Richmond	7 – McCamey	Madison Square Garden (11,723); New York, NY
Tue, Nov 23, 2010*; 8:45 pm, ESPNU	No. 19	Yale	W 73–47	5–1	16 – Richardson	13 – Tisdale	7 – McCamey	Assembly Hall (13,858); Champaign, IL
Sat, Nov 27, 2010*; 1:00 pm, ESPN3	No. 19	at Western Michigan	W 78–63	6–1	18 – Tisdale	7 – Tisdale	10 – McCamey	University Arena (4,532); Kalamazoo, MI
Tue, Nov 30, 2010*; 8:30 pm, ESPN	No. 20	North Carolina; ACC – Big Ten Challenge	W 79–67	7–1	20 – Davis	10 – Davis	5 – Davis	Assembly Hall (16,618); Champaign, IL
Sat, Dec 04, 2010*; 4:00 pm, ESPN	No. 20	vs. Gonzaga; Battle in Seattle	W 73–61	8–1	15 – Davis, Richardson	6 – Davis	7 – McCamey	KeyArena (14,789); Seattle, WA
Wed, Dec 08, 2010*; 7:00 pm, BTN.com	No. 16	Oakland	W 74–63	9–1	30 – McCamey	12 – Tisdale	3 – McCamey, Tisdale	Assembly Hall (15,256); Champaign, IL
Sun, Dec 12, 2010*; 5:00 pm, BTN	No. 16	Northern Colorado	W 86–76	10–1	14 – Tisdale, Richardson	10 – Davis	8 – McCamey	Assembly Hall (14,814); Champaign, IL
Sat, Dec 18, 2010*; 1:00 pm, BTN	No. 12	vs. Illinois-Chicago	L 54–57	10–2	16 – McCamey	12 – Richmond	6 – McCamey	United Center (13,117); Chicago, IL
Wed, Dec 22, 2010*; 8:00 pm, ESPN2	No. 21	vs. No. 9 Missouri; Braggin' Rights	L 64–75	10–3	17 – Davis	13 – Tisdale	6 – McCamey	Scottrade Center (21,906); St. Louis, MO
Big Ten regular season
Wed, Dec 29, 2010; 8:00 pm, BTN	No. 23	at Iowa; Rivalry	W 87–77	11–3 (1–0)	20 – McCamey	7 – Tisdale	10 – McCamey	Carver-Hawkeye Arena (15,500); Iowa City, IA
Sun, Jan 02, 2011; 5:00 pm, BTN	No. 23	Wisconsin	W 69–61	12–3 (2–0)	21 – McCamey	14 – Davis	7 – McCamey	Assembly Hall (16,618); Champaign, IL
Thu, Jan 06, 2011; 8:00 pm, ESPN2	No. 20	Northwestern; Rivalry	W 88–63	13–3 (3–0)	14 – McCamey	7 – Davis	7 – Davis, McCamey	Assembly Hall (14,862); Champaign, IL
Tue, Jan 11, 2011; 8:00 pm, BTN	No. 16	at Penn State	L 55–57	13–4 (3–1)	16 – Tisdale	14 – Tisdale	5 – McCamey	Bryce Jordan Center (6,353); University Park, PA
Sat, Jan 15, 2011; 2:00 pm, BTN	No. 16	at No. 20 Wisconsin	L 66–76	13–5 (3–2)	23 – McCamey	9 – Tisdale	5 – McCamey	Kohl Center (17,230); Madison, WI
Tue, Jan 18, 2011; 6:00 pm, ESPN	No. 23	No. 17 Michigan State	W 71–62	14–5 (4–2)	20 – Paul	11 – Davis	11 – McCamey	Assembly Hall (16,618); Champaign, IL
Sat, Jan 22, 2011; 11:00 am, CBS	No. 23	No. 1 Ohio State	L 68–73	14–6 (4–3)	18 – Richmond	10 – Richmond	5 – McCamey	Assembly Hall (16,618); Champaign, IL
Thu, Jan 27, 2011; 8:00 pm, BTN	No. 20	at Indiana; Rivalry	L 49–52	14–7 (4–4)	14 – Davis	18 – Richmond	3 – McCamey	Assembly Hall (16,297); Bloomington, IN
Tue, Feb 01, 2011; 8:00 pm, BTN		Penn State	W 68–51	15–7 (5–4)	22 – Davis	10 – Richmond	5 – McCamey, Paul	Assembly Hall (14,996); Champaign, IL
Sat, Feb 05, 2011; 12:00PM, CBS		at Northwestern; Rivalry	L 70–71	15–8 (5–5)	21 – Paul	6 – Davis	4 – McCamey, Richmond	Welsh-Ryan Arena (8,117); Evanston, IL
Thu, Feb 10, 2011; 8:00 pm, ESPN(2)		at Minnesota	W 71–62	16–8 (6–5)	17 – McCamey, Davis	9 – Davis	4 – McCamey, Richmond	Williams Arena (14,625); Minneapolis, MN
Sun, Feb 13, 2011; 12:00 pm, CBS		No. 14 Purdue	L 70–81	16–9 (6–6)	23 – Paul	7 – Davis	4 – McCamey	Assembly Hall (16,618); Champaign, IL
Wed, Feb 16, 2011; 7:30 pm, BTN		Michigan	W 54–52	17–9 (7–6)	18 – McCamey	10 – Davis	5 – Davis	Assembly Hall (16,273); Champaign, IL
Sat, Feb 19, 2011; 8:00 pm, ESPN		at Michigan State; ESPN College GameDay	L 57–61	17–10 (7–7)	15 – McCamey	5 – Davis	5 – McCamey	Breslin Center (14,797); East Lansing, MI
Tue, Feb 22, 2011; 6:00 pm, ESPN		at No. 2 Ohio State	L 70–89	17–11 (7–8)	18 – Davis	9 – Richmond	6 – McCamey	Schottenstein Center (18,085); Columbus, OH
Sat, Feb 26, 2011; 6:00 pm, BTN		Iowa; Rivalry	W 81–68	18–11 (8–8)	25 – Tisdale	9 – Davis	7 – McCamey	Assembly Hall (16,618); Champaign, IL
Tue, Mar 01, 2011; 6:00 pm, ESPN		at No. 6 Purdue	L 67–75	18–12 (8–9)	18 – McCamey	10 – Davis	4 – McCamey, Tisdale	Mackey Arena (14,123); West Lafayette, IN
Sat, Mar 05, 2011; 11:00 am, BTN		Indiana; Rivalry	W 72–48	19–12 (9–9)	22 – McCamey	9 – Davis, Tisdale	4 – McCamey	Assembly Hall (16,618); Champaign, IL
Big Ten tournament
Fri, Mar 11, 2011; 1:30 pm, ESPN	(5)	vs. (4) Michigan; Quarterfinals	L 55–60	19–13	10 – McCamey, Tisdale, Paul	7 – Davis, Tisdale	5 – McCamey	Conseco Fieldhouse (17,975); Indianapolis, IN
NCAA tournament
Fri, Mar 18, 2011*; 8:20 pm, TBS	(9 SW)	vs. (8 SW) UNLV; First Round	W 73–62	20–13	22 – Davis	9 – Davis	7 – McCamey	BOK Center (14,353); Tulsa, OK
Sun, Mar 20, 2011*; 7:40 pm, TNT	(9 SW)	vs. (1 SW) No. 2 Kansas; Second Round	L 59–73	20–14	17 – Davis	11 – Tisdale	7 – McCamey	BOK Center (15,839); Tulsa, OK
*Non-conference game. ^{#}Rankings from AP Poll. (#) Tournament seedings in parentheses. All times are in Central Time.

== National rankings ==
Various publications and news sources released their preseason rankings prior to the start of the 2010–11 season. Illinois was ranked by the publications below. The Fighting Illini were ranked 13th in the AP Poll and 16th in the Coaches Poll in their respective pre-season polls.

Pre-season rankings
Athlon	Lindy's	Sporting News	Fox Sports	CBS Sports	Rivals.com	Blue Ribbon
19	9	15	12	16	14	9

Regular season polls
Poll	Pre- season	Week 1	Week 2	Week 3	Week 4	Week 5	Week 6	Week 7	Week 8	Week 9	Week 10	Week 11	Week 12	Week 13	Week 14	Week 15	Week 16	Week 17	Week 18	Final
AP	13	13	19	20	16	12	21	23	20	16	23	20	RV	RV						
Coaches	16	16	19	21	17	14	21	25	20	16	22	21	24	RV						RV

Legend
	Increase in ranking
	Decrease in ranking
	No change
(RV)	Received votes

== Season statistics ==
Legend
GP	Games played	GS	Games started	Avg	Average per game
FG	Field-goals made	FGA	Field-goal attempts	Off	Offensive rebounds
Def	Defensive rebounds	A	Assists	TO	Turnovers
Blk	Blocks	Stl	Steals	High	Team high

Individual player statistics
			Minutes		Total FGs			3-point FGs			Free-throws			Rebounds										Scoring	
Player	GP	GS	Tot	Avg	FG	FGA	Pct	3FG	3FA	Pct	FT	FTA	Pct	Off	Def	Tot	Avg	PF	FO	A	TO	Blk	Stl	Pts	Avg
McCamey, Demetri	31	29	1026	33.1	153	335	.457	68	147	.463	91	124	.734	16	90	106	3.4	62	0	189	89	6	31	465	15.0
Davis, Mike	31	31	1009	32.5	158	295	.536	0	1	.000	61	90	.678	50	170	220	7.1	73	1	51	41	26	28	377	12.2
Tisdale, Mike	31	29	792	25.5	119	230	.517	18	42	.429	56	70	.800	70	129	199	6.4	111	5	36	52	50	15	312	10.1
Paul, Brandon	31	8	673	21.7	90	225	.400	38	108	.352	66	84	.786	18	71	89	2.9	53	0	61	55	10	29	284	9.2
Richardson, D.J.	31	29	853	27.5	91	224	.406	50	130	.385	25	33	.758	11	46	57	1.8	63	1	60	36	5	20	257	8.3
Richmond, Jereme	30	6	669	22.3	101	193	.523	2	11	.182	26	43	.605	53	101	154	5.1	50	1	57	51	13	13	230	7.7
Cole, Bill	31	21	627	20.2	53	117	.453	29	80	.363	17	21	.810	29	51	80	2.6	53	0	40	12	16	19	152	4.9
Leonard, Meyers	30	1	260	8.7	27	57	.474	0	1	.000	10	15	.667	10	31	41	1.4	46	0	5	24	12	5	64	2.1
Griffey, Tyler	24	0	166	6.9	14	42	.333	4	11	.364	10	15	.667	11	18	29	1.2	20	0	1	12	3	5	42	1.8
Bertrand, Joseph	13	0	49	3.8	7	13	.538	0	1	.000	3	4	.750	1	5	6	0.5	6	0	3	3	2	1	17	1.3
Head, Crandall	15	1	83	5.5	7	18	.389	1	7	.143	4	6	.667	1	2	3	0.2	8	0	10	11	0	3	19	1.3
Berardini, Kevin	8	0	14	1.8	1	1	1.000	0	0	.000	4	6	.667	1	2	4	0.4	2	0	1	2	0	1	6	0.8
Selus, Jean	5	0	5	1.0	0	1	.000	0	1	.000	1	2	.500	0	0	0	0.0	1	0	1	0	0	1	1	0.2
Team														47	49	96		1			7				
Total	31		6226		821	1751	.469	210	540	.389	374	513	.729	318	765	1083	34.9	549	8	515	395	143	171	2226	71.8
Opponents	31		6227		712	1777	.401	183	612	.299	420	582	.722	361	670	1031	33.3	509	5	375	382	91	171	2027	65.4
