= 2010–11 Ohio State Buckeyes men's basketball team =

American college basketball season

2010–11 Ohio State Buckeyes men's basketball

Big Ten regular season champions Big Ten tournament champions

NCAA tournament, Sweet Sixteen
- Conference: Big Ten

Ranking
- Coaches: No. 5
- AP: No. 1
- Record: 34–3 (16–2 Big Ten)
- Head coach: Thad Matta
- Assistant coaches: Jeff Boals; Dave Dickerson; Brandon Miller
- Home arena: Value City Arena

2010–11 Big Ten Conference men's basketball standings
	Conf.				Overall
Team	W		L	PCT	W		L	PCT
No. 1 Ohio State †	16	–	2	.889	34	–	3	.919
No. 13 Purdue	14	–	4	.778	26	–	8	.765
No. 16 Wisconsin	13	–	5	.722	25	–	9	.735
Michigan	9	–	9	.500	21	–	14	.600
Illinois	9	–	9	.500	20	–	14	.588
Penn State	9	–	9	.500	19	–	15	.559
Michigan State	9	–	9	.500	19	–	15	.559
Northwestern	7	–	11	.389	20	–	14	.588
Minnesota	6	–	12	.333	17	–	14	.548
Iowa	4	–	14	.222	11	–	20	.355
Indiana	3	–	15	.167	12	–	20	.375
† 2011 Big Ten tournament winner Rankings from AP poll

The 2010–11 Ohio State Buckeyes men's basketball team represented Ohio State University during the 2010–11 NCAA Division I men's basketball season. Their head coach was Thad Matta, in his 7th season with the Buckeyes. The team played its home games at Value City Arena in Columbus, Ohio, and is a member of the Big Ten Conference. The Buckeyes finished the regular season 32–2 and were ranked #1 overall in the media polls seven weeks during the season. The team won their second consecutive Big Ten regular season championship and Big Ten tournament championship. They entered the 2011 NCAA Division I men's basketball tournament as the overall #1 seed. They defeated Texas–San Antonio in the second round and George Mason in the third round to advance to the Sweet Sixteen where they were upset by Kentucky to finish the season 34–3.

== Pre-season ==
=== Departures ===
The Ohio State Buckeyes lost a key player in Evan Turner in the 2010 NBA draft. Turner left Ohio State after completing his junior season leading OSU to a 29–8 record and a trip to the Sweet Sixteen in the NCAA tournament. Turner was selected second overall to the Philadelphia 76ers only behind former Kentucky Wildcat John Wall. Other senior departs are noted below.

- #2 Jeremie Simmons – G
- #4 P.J. Hill – G
- #13 Danny Peters – G
- #15 Kyle Madson – C
- #34 Mark Titus – G

=== 2010 Recruiting Class ===
College recruiting information
Name	Hometown	School	Height	Weight	Commit date
Aaron Craft; PG	Findlay, Ohio	Liberty Benton	6 ft 2 in (1.88 m)	172 lb (78 kg)	Jun 7, 2009
Aaron Craft; PG	Recruit ratings: Scout: Rivals: (92)				
Jordan Sibert; SG	Cincinnati, Ohio	Princeton	6 ft 4 in (1.93 m)	180 lb (82 kg)	Sep 20, 2008
Jordan Sibert; SG	Recruit ratings: Scout: Rivals: (93)				
Lenzelle Smith Jr. SF	Zion, Illinois	Zion Benton	6 ft 3 in (1.91 m)	200 lb (91 kg)	Sep 22, 2008
Lenzelle Smith Jr. SF	Recruit ratings: Scout: Rivals: (94)				
Jared Sullinger; C	Columbus, Ohio	Northland	6 ft 8 in (2.03 m)	260 lb (120 kg)	May 10, 2007
Jared Sullinger; C	Recruit ratings: Scout: Rivals: (98)				
Deshaun Thomas; PF	Fort Wayne, Indiana	Bishop Luers	6 ft 6 in (1.98 m)	208 lb (94 kg)	Jun 1, 2007
Deshaun Thomas; PF	Recruit ratings: Scout: Rivals: (96)				
J. D. Weatherspoon; PF	Columbus, Ohio	Northland	6 ft 6 in (1.98 m)	200 lb (91 kg)	Aug 11, 2009
J. D. Weatherspoon; PF	Recruit ratings: Scout: Rivals: (91)				
Overall recruit ranking: Rivals: 3
Note: In many cases, Scout, Rivals, 247Sports, On3, and ESPN may conflict in their listings of height and weight.; In these cases, the average was taken. ESPN grades are on a 100-point scale.; Sources: "2010 Team Ranking". Rivals.

== Roster ==
2010–11 Ohio State Buckeyes men's basketball team
Players
Coaches

Pos.	#	Name	Height	Weight	Year	Hometown
F	0	Jared Sullinger	6 ft 9 in (2.06 m)	260 lb (118 kg)	Fr	Columbus, Ohio
F	1	Deshaun Thomas	6 ft 9 in (2.06 m)	260 lb (118 kg)	Fr	Fort Wayne, Indiana
G	2	Jordan Sibert	6 ft 4 in (1.93 m)	180 lb (82 kg)	Fr	Cincinnati, Ohio
G	4	Aaron Craft	6 ft 2 in (1.88 m)	195 lb (88 kg)	Fr	Findlay, Ohio
G	10	Eddie Days	6 ft 0 in (1.83 m)	180 lb (82 kg)	Sr	Richmond Heights, Ohio
F	15	J.D. Weatherspoon	6 ft 7 in (2.01 m)	210 lb (95 kg)	Fr	Columbus, Ohio
G/F	23	David Lighty	6 ft 5 in (1.96 m)	220 lb (100 kg)	Sr	Cleveland, Ohio
F	24	Nikola Kecman	6 ft 8 in (2.03 m)	220 lb (100 kg)	Jr	Belgrade, Serbia
F	30	Evan Ravenel	6 ft 8 in (2.03 m)	260 lb (118 kg)	Jr	Tampa, Florida
G	32	Lenzelle Smith Jr.	6 ft 3 in (1.91 m)	230 lb (104 kg)	Fr	Zion, Illinois
G	33	Jon Diebler	6 ft 6 in (1.98 m)	205 lb (93 kg)	Sr	Upper Sandusky, Ohio
G	44	William Buford	6 ft 5 in (1.96 m)	205 lb (93 kg)	Jr	Toledo, Ohio
F	52	Dallas Lauderdale	6 ft 8 in (2.03 m)	255 lb (116 kg)	Sr	Solon, Ohio

Head coach

- Thad Matta

Assistant coach(es)

- Jeff Boals
- Dave Dickerson
- Brandon Miller

Legend

- (C) Team captain
- (S) Suspended
- (I) Ineligible
- (W) Walk-on
- Injured
- Current redshirt

Roster
Last update: 2010-10-20

=== Depth chart ===
Pos.	Starting 5	Bench 1	Bench 2
C	Dallas Lauderdale
PF	Jared Sullinger	Deshaun Thomas	Evan Ravenel
SF	David Lighty	J.D. Weatherspoon	Nikola Kecman
SG	Jon Diebler	Jordan Sibert
PG	William Buford	Aaron Craft	Eddie Days

== 2010–2011 Schedule ==
Date time, TV	Rank^{#}	Opponent^{#}	Result	Record	Site (attendance) city, state
Exhibition
11/7/10*; 2:00 p.m.	No. 4	Walsh	W 102–56	—	Value City Arena (12,234); Columbus, OH
Regular season
11/12/10*; 7:00 p.m., ESPN3	No. 4	North Carolina A&T; Global Sports Invitational	W 102–61	1–0	Value City Arena (13,302); Columbus, OH
11/16/10*; 6:00 p.m., ESPN	No. 4	at No. 9 Florida; Global Sports Invitational	W 93–75	2–0	O'Connell Center (12,110); Gainesville, FL
11/20/10*; 8:00 p.m., BTN	No. 4	UNC Wilmington; Global Sports Invitational	W 81–41	3–0	Value City Arena (11,882); Columbus, OH
11/23/10*; 7:00 p.m., ESPN3	No. 3	Morehead State; Global Sports Invitational	W 64–45	4–0	Value City Arena (12,305); Columbus, OH
11/26/10*; 4:00 p.m., BTN	No. 3	Miami (OH)	W 66–45	5–0	Value City Arena (15,935); Columbus, OH
11/30/10*; 7:30 p.m., ESPN	No. 2	at Florida State; ACC–Big Ten Challenge	W 58–44	6–0	Donald L. Tucker Center (10,457); Tallahassee, FL
12/9/10*; 7:00 p.m., BTN	No. 2	IUPUI	W 75–64	7–0	Value City Arena (11,410); Columbus, OH
12/12/10*; 2:00 p.m.	No. 2	Western Carolina	W 85–60	8–0	St. John Arena (6,905); Columbus, OH
12/15/10*; 6:30 p.m., BTN	No. 2	Florida Gulf Coast	W 83–55	9–0	Value City Arena (12,613); Columbus, OH
12/18/10*; 2:00 p.m., CBS	No. 2	South Carolina	W 79–57	10–0	Value City Arena (15,497); Columbus, OH
12/21/10*; 8:30 p.m., BTN	No. 2	UNC Asheville	W 96–49	11–0	Value City Arena (12,658); Columbus, OH
12/23/10*; 8:00 p.m., BTN	No. 2	Oakland	W 92–63	12–0	Value City Arena (13,459); Columbus, OH
12/27/10*; 8:30 p.m., BTN	No. 2	UT Martin	W 100–40	13–0	Value City Arena (15,133); Columbus, OH
12/31/10; 6:00 p.m., ESPN2	No. 2	at Indiana	W 85–67	14–0 (1–0)	Assembly Hall (14,883); Bloomington, IN
1/4/11; 9:00 p.m., BTN	No. 2	at Iowa	W 73–68	15–0 (2–0)	Carver–Hawkeye Arena (9,810); Iowa City, IA
1/9/11; 2:00 p.m., BTN	No. 2	Minnesota	W 67–64	16–0 (3–0)	Value City Arena (17,392); Columbus, OH
1/12/11; 6:30 p.m., BTN	No. 2	at Michigan	W 68–64	17–0 (4–0)	Crisler Arena (11,994); Ann Arbor, MI
1/15/11; 5:30 p.m., BTN	No. 2	Penn State	W 69–66	18–0 (5–0)	Value City Arena (18,809); Columbus, OH
1/19/11; 6:30 p.m., BTN	No. 1	Iowa	W 70–48	19–0 (6–0)	Value City Arena (14,321); Columbus, OH
1/22/11; 12:00 p.m., CBS	No. 1	at No. 23 Illinois	W 73–68	20–0 (7–0)	Assembly Hall (16,618); Champaign, IL
1/25/11; 9:00 p.m., ESPN	No. 1	No. 12 Purdue	W 87–64	21–0 (8–0)	Value City Arena (17,556); Columbus, OH
1/29/11; 6:00 p.m., ESPN2	No. 1	at Northwestern	W 58–57	22–0 (9–0)	Welsh-Ryan Arena (8,117); Evanston, IL
2/3/11; 7:00 p.m., ESPN	No. 1	Michigan	W 62–53	23–0 (10–0)	Value City Arena (18,809); Columbus, OH
2/6/11; 2:00 p.m., ESPN	No. 1	at No. 18 Minnesota	W 82–69	24–0 (11–0)	Williams Arena (14,625); Minneapolis, MN
2/12/11; 2:00 p.m., ESPN	No. 1	at No. 13 Wisconsin	L 67–71	24–1 (11–1)	Kohl Center (17,230); Madison, WI
2/15/11; 9:00 p.m., ESPN	No. 2	Michigan State	W 71–61	25–1 (12–1)	Value City Arena (18,802); Columbus, OH
2/20/11; 1:00 p.m., CBS	No. 2	at No. 11 Purdue	L 63–76	25–2 (12–2)	Mackey Arena (14,123); West Lafayette, IN
2/22/11; 7:00 p.m., ESPN	No. 2	Illinois	W 89–70	26–2 (13–2)	Value City Arena (18,085); Columbus, OH
2/27/11; 4:00 p.m., CBS	No. 2	Indiana	W 82–61	27–2 (14–2)	Value City Arena (18,809); Columbus, OH
3/1/11; 9:00 p.m., BTN	No. 1	at Penn State	W 82–61	28–2 (15–2)	Bryce Jordan Center (15,403); University Park, PA
3/6/11; 4:00 p.m., CBS	No. 1	No. 10 Wisconsin	W 93–65	29–2 (16–2)	Value City Arena (18,809); Columbus, OH
Big Ten tournament
3/11/11; 12:00 p.m., ESPN	(1) No. 1	vs. (8) Northwestern; Big Ten Quarterfinals	W 67–61 ^{OT}	30–2	Conseco Fieldhouse (17,975); Indianapolis, IN
3/12/11; 1:40 p.m., CBS	(1) No. 1	vs. (4) Michigan; Big Ten Semifinals	W 68–61	31–2	Conseco Fieldhouse (18,377); Indianapolis, IN
3/13/11; 3:30 p.m., CBS	(1) No. 1	vs. (6) Penn State; Big Ten Championship Game	W 71–60	32–2	Conseco Fieldhouse (15,770); Indianapolis, IN
NCAA tournament
3/18/11*; 4:40 p.m., TNT	(1 E) No. 1	vs. (16 E) UTSA; NCAA Second Round	W 75–46	33–2	Quicken Loans Arena (20,164); Cleveland, OH
3/20/11*; 5:15 p.m., CBS	(1 E) No. 1	vs. (8 E) George Mason; NCAA Third Round	W 98–66	34–2	Quicken Loans Arena (20,164); Cleveland, OH
3/25/11*; 9:45 p.m., CBS	(1 E) No. 1	vs. (4 E) No. 11 Kentucky; NCAA Sweet Sixteen	L 60–62	34–3	Prudential Center (18,343); Newark, NJ
*Non-conference game. ^{#}Rankings from AP Poll. (#) Tournament seedings in parentheses. E=NCAA East Regional. All times are in Eastern Time.

== Game Notes – NCAA tournament ==
=== Second Round: UT–San Antonio ===
Teams	1st	2nd	Final
(16) UTSA	21	25	46
(1) OSU	37	38	75

Ohio State began the 2011 NCAA tournament bid with a commanding 75–46 win of the University of Texas-San Antonio Roadrunners. The Buckeyes were contested early however took control of the game halfway through the first half. Leading 37–21 at halftime, the Buckeyes opened their lead and moved on to the third round of the tournament where they faced the George Mason Patriots.

=== Third round: George Mason ===
Teams	1st	2nd	Final
(8) GMU	26	40	66
(1) OSU	52	46	98

The third round showcased a match up between the #1 Ohio State Buckeyes and #8 George Mason Patriots. George Mason opened the game on an 11–2 run and quickly took the momentum. However, the overall seed in Ohio State would not back down. Led by senior David Lighty and Jon Diebler, the Buckeyes quickly went on a run to end the first half of play with a 52–26 lead. The pounding by the Buckeyes continued as they worked the ball around to their star freshmen in Jared Sullinger and Aaron Craft. Ending the game as they had in the first half, Ohio State continued to cruise through and went on to win the game 98–66 in front of biased crowd in Cleveland, Ohio.

=== Regional semifinal: Kentucky ===
Teams	1st	2nd	Final
(4) UK	30	32	62
(1) OSU	30	30	60

The Buckeyes reached the Sweet Sixteen for the second year in a row and for the second year they faced an SEC opponent. Ohio State and Kentucky both began the game struggling to shoot and to get any sort of momentum going with both teams tied at 30 heading into the second half. The second half remained an extremely close affair with neither team really able to pull away. In the final second of the game Kentucky was able to put together a game winning shot and put the Wildcats ahead 62–60, which would be the final score in the game. This loss ended the season for the Buckeyes, and for the second year in a row, Ohio State fell in the Sweet Sixteen.

== Rankings ==
Ranking movement Legend: ██ Increase in ranking. ██ Decrease in ranking. ██ Not ranked the previous week.
Poll	Pre	Wk 1	Wk 2	Wk 3	Wk 4	Wk 5	Wk 6	Wk 7	Wk 8	Wk 9	Wk 10	Wk 11	Wk 12	Wk 13	Wk 14	Feb 21	Feb 28	Mar 7	Wk 18	Final
AP	4	4	3	2	2	2	2	2	2	2	1	1	1	1	2	2	1	1	1	
Coaches	5	5	3	2	2	2	2	2	2	2	1	1	1	1	3	3	1	1	1	5

== See also ==
- 2011 NCAA Division I men's basketball tournament
- 2010-11 NCAA Division I men's basketball season
- List of NCAA Division I institutions
