= 2010 Maui Invitational =

- Season: 2010–11
- Teams: 8
- Finals site: Lahaina Civic Center, Maui, Hawaii
- Champions: UConn (2nd title)
- Runner-up: Kentucky (2nd title game)
- Semifinalists: Michigan State (4th semifinal); Washington (1st semifinal)
- Winning coach: Jim Calhoun (2nd title)
- MVP: Kemba Walker (UConn)

The 2010 Maui Invitational Tournament, an annual early-season college basketball tournament held in Lahaina, Hawaii, was won by the Connecticut Huskies.

== Bracket ==
Fifth Place Game; November 21
Wichita State	70
Virginia	57
Seventh Place Game
Oklahoma	64
Chaminade	68

Consolation 2nd Round; November 23
Wichita State	79
Chaminade	58
Oklahoma	56
Virginia	74

First round November 22
Wichita State	79
Connecticut	83
2	Michigan State	82
Chaminade	74
Oklahoma	54
9	Kentucky	67
Virginia	63
11	Washington	106

Semifinals; November 23
Connecticut	70
2	Michigan State	67
9	Kentucky	74
11	Washington	67

Championship; November 24
Connecticut	84
9	Kentucky	67
Third-place game
2	Michigan State	76
11	Washington	71
