= 2010–11 Big Ten Conference men's basketball season =

- League: NCAA Division I
- Sport: Basketball
- Duration: December 27, 2010 – March 6, 2011
- Teams: 11
- Total attendance: 2,475,440
- Average attendance: 12,826
- TV partner(s): Big Ten Network, ESPN, CBS

2010–11 NCAA Division I season
- Regular season champions: Ohio State
- Runners-Up: Purdue
- Season MVP: JaJuan Johnson

Tournament
- Venue: Conseco Fieldhouse, Indianapolis, Indiana
- Champions: Ohio State
- Runners-up: Penn State
- Finals MVP: Jared Sullinger

Basketball seasons
- 2009–10 2011–12

2010–11 Big Ten Conference men's basketball standings
	Conf.				Overall
Team	W		L	PCT	W		L	PCT
No. 1 Ohio State †	16	–	2	.889	34	–	3	.919
No. 13 Purdue	14	–	4	.778	26	–	8	.765
No. 16 Wisconsin	13	–	5	.722	25	–	9	.735
Michigan	9	–	9	.500	21	–	14	.600
Illinois	9	–	9	.500	20	–	14	.588
Penn State	9	–	9	.500	19	–	15	.559
Michigan State	9	–	9	.500	19	–	15	.559
Northwestern	7	–	11	.389	20	–	14	.588
Minnesota	6	–	12	.333	17	–	14	.548
Iowa	4	–	14	.222	11	–	20	.355
Indiana	3	–	15	.167	12	–	20	.375
† 2011 Big Ten tournament winner Rankings from AP poll

The 2010–11 Big Ten Conference men's basketball season marked the continuation of the annual tradition of competitive basketball among Big Ten Conference members that began in 1904. The non-conference portion of the 2010–11 NCAA Division I men's basketball season began on November 8, 2010. Conference play began on December 27, 2010. Ohio state won the regular season Big Ten title. Following conference play, Conseco Fieldhouse in Indianapolis hosted the 2011 Big Ten Conference men's basketball tournament from Thursday, March 10 through Sunday, March 13, which was also won by Ohio State. The Big Ten Conference hosted second and third round games of the 2011 NCAA Men's Division I Basketball Tournament at the United Center in Chicago March 18 and 20, 2011.

The Big Ten had seven teams invited to the 68-team 2011 NCAA Men's Division I Basketball Tournament (NCAA tournament) and one team invited to the 2011 National Invitation Tournament (NIT). Ohio State was a number one seed and along with Wisconsin survived until the Sweet Sixteen round. No Big Ten teams made the elite eight and the Big Ten finished with a 7–7 record in the tournament. Northwestern made the elite eight round of the 32-team NIT before being eliminated.

JaJuan Johnson was the regular season MVP and Jared Sullinger was the 2011 Big Ten Conference men's basketball tournament MVP. Both earned first team recognition as 2011 NCAA Men's Basketball All-Americans and Sullinger earned numerous National Freshman of the Year Awards, including the USBWA National Freshman of the Year. Blake Hoffarber earned 2nd team Academic All-America recognition. The conference led the nation in attendance for the 35th straight season with a 12,826 overall average and 7 of the top 25 schools.

Following the season several athletes represented the Big Ten as members of USA Basketball team USA honorees: Keith Appling, Meyers Leonard and Tim Hardaway Jr. were on Team USA for the 2011 FIBA Under-19 World Championship, while Trevor Mbakwe and Draymond Green were on Team USA for the 2011 Summer Universiade coached by Matt Painter. Five Big Ten athletes were drafted in the 2011 NBA draft with JaJuan Johnson (27th overall) and four additional selections (Jon Leuer, Darius Morris, Jon Diebler and E'Twaun Moore) in the second round.

== Preseason ==
Seventeen members of the 2009-10 All-Conference teams returned, including five players who earned first-team honors over the prior two seasons and a previous Big Ten Player of the Year. Eight career 1,000-points scorers, including two 1,500-point scorers returned. Fourteen of the conference's top scorers and rebounders in all games played from last season, including five of the top 10 of each category returned. Eight players that led the conference in a statistical category last season for all games played also returned.

The Big Ten media panel announced that they selected Michigan State, Ohio State and Purdue as the preseason media day selections. They also announced the 2010–11 All-Big Ten Conference first-team selections: Kalin Lucas MSU, Demetri McCamey ILL, E'Twaun Moore PUR, Jon Leuer WIS, and JaJuan Johnson PUR. Lucas repeated as the preseason conference player of the year.

=== Preseason watchlists ===
On October 4, 2010, the Wooden Award preseason watch list included eight Big Ten players. The watchlist was composed of 50 players who were not transfers, freshmen or medical redshirts. The list will be reduced to a 30-player mid-season watchlist in December and a final national ballot of about 20 players in March. The Naismith College Player of the Year watchlist of 50 players was announced on November 16, 2010. In late February, a shorter list of the Top 30 will be compiled in preparation for a March vote to narrow the list to the four finalists.

	Wooden	Naismith
Talor BattlePSU	✓	✓
William BufordOSU	✓	✓
Robbie HummelPUR	✓	
JaJuan JohnsonPUR	✓	✓
Jon LeuerWIS	✓	✓
Kalin LucasMSU	✓	✓
Demetri McCameyILL	✓	✓
E'Twaun MoorePUR	✓	✓
John ShurnaNU	✓	✓
Jared SullingerOSU		✓
Durrell SummersMSU	✓	✓

Lauer, Moore, Minnesota's Blake Hoffarber, and Ohio State's David Lighty were named as candidates for the Lowe's Senior CLASS Award.

== Rankings ==
The Big Ten Conference entered the season with five teams ranked in the USA Today/ESPN Preseason Top 25 Men's Basketball Coaches' Poll.

Legend
	Improvement in ranking
	Drop in ranking
	Not ranked previous week
RV	Received votes but were not ranked in Top 25 of poll

		Pre	Wk 1	Wk 2	Wk 3	Wk 4	Wk 5	Wk 6	Wk 7	Wk 8	Wk 9	Wk 10	Wk 11	Wk 12	Wk 13	Wk 14	Wk 15	Wk 16	Wk 17	Final
Illinois	AP	13	13	19	20	16	12	21	23	20	16	23	20	RV	RV					
Illinois	C	16	16	19	21	17	14	21	25	20	16	22	21	24	RV					RV
Indiana	AP																			
Indiana	C																			
Iowa	AP																			
Iowa	C																			
Michigan	AP																			
Michigan	C																			RV
Michigan State	AP	2 (8)	2 (7)	2 (6)	6	7	14	12	20	18	RV	17	25							
Michigan State	C	2 (2)	2 (2)	2 (2)	6	8	15	12	19	19	24	18	RV							
Minnesota	AP	RV	RV	15	15	22	21	17	14	RV	RV	15	16	18	RV					
Minnesota	C	RV	RV	17	13	20	20	16	13	21	25	19	18	20	25					
Northwestern	AP					RV	RV	RV	RV											
Northwestern	C	RV	RV	RV	RV	RV	RV	RV	RV											
Ohio State	AP	4	4	3	2	2	2	2 (1)	2	2	2	1 (49)	1 (63)	1 (65)	1 (65)	2 (14)	2 (10)	1 (45)	1 (52)	
Ohio State	C	5	5	3	2	2	2	2	2	2	2	1 (28)	1 (31)	1 (31)	1 (31)	3 (3)	3 (4)	1 (17)	1 (25)	5 (1)
Penn State	AP												RV	RV						
Penn State	C																			
Purdue	AP	14	14	10	22	19	19	14	12	11	8	14	12	11	14	11	8	6	9	
Purdue	C	8	9	8	18	18	17	13	11	10	8	13	12	10	12	11	8	6	9	17
Wisconsin	AP	RV	RV	RV			RV	RV	RV	RV	20	18	17	19	13	10	12	10	13	
Wisconsin	C	24	25	RV	RV	RV	RV	RV	24	RV	21	17	15	18	14	10	12	10	13	15

== Preconference schedules ==
=== Tournaments ===
Big Ten teams emerged victorious in the following tournament:

Name	Dates	Num. teams	Champions
Puerto Rico Tip-Off	Nov. 18–21	8	Minnesota

=== ACC–Big Ten Challenge ===
The 12th annual ACC–Big Ten Challenge matchups were announced on May 12, 2010. The November 29—December 1 schedule with game times and locations was set on August 9, 2010.

Date	Time	ACC Team	Big Ten Team	Location	Television	Attendance	Winner	Challenge Leader
Mon., Nov 29	7:00PM	Virginia	#13 Minnesota	Williams Arena • Minneapolis, MN	ESPN2	12,089	Virginia (87-79)	ACC (1-0)
Tue., Nov 30	7:00PM	Wake Forest	Iowa	LJVM Coliseum • Winston-Salem, NC	ESPNU	9,086	Wake Forest (76-73)	ACC (2-0)
Tue., Nov 30	7:00PM	Georgia Tech	Northwestern	Welsh-Ryan Arena • Evanston, IL	ESPN2	4,455	Northwestern (91-71)	ACC (2-1)
Tue., Nov 30	7:30PM	Florida State	#2 Ohio State	Donald L. Tucker Center • Tallahassee, FL	ESPN	10,457	Ohio State (58-44)	Tied (2-2)
Tue., Nov 30	9:00PM	Clemson	Michigan	Littlejohn Coliseum • Clemson, SC	ESPN2	7,237	Michigan (69-61)	Big Ten (3-2)
Tue., Nov 30	9:30PM	North Carolina	#21 Illinois	Assembly Hall • Champaign, IL	ESPN	16,618	Illinois (79-67)	Big Ten (4-2)
Wed., Dec 1	7:15PM	Boston College	Indiana	Conte Forum • Chestnut Hill, MA	ESPNU	5,329	Boston College (88-76)	Big Ten (4-3)
Wed., Dec 1	7:15PM	NC State	Wisconsin	Kohl Center • Madison, WI	ESPN2	17,230	Wisconsin (87-48)	Big Ten (5-3)
Wed., Dec 1	7:30PM	Virginia Tech	#18 Purdue	Cassell Coliseum • Blacksburg, VA	ESPN	9,847	Purdue (58-55 OT)	Big Ten (6-3)
Wed., Dec 1	9:15PM	Maryland	Penn State	Bryce Jordan Center • University Park, PA	ESPN2	9,078	Maryland (62-39)	Big Ten (6-4)
Wed., Dec 1	9:30PM	#1 Duke	#6 Michigan State	Cameron Indoor Stadium • Durham, NC	ESPN	9,314	Duke (84-79)	Big Ten (6-5)
Game Times in EST. Rankings from ESPN Coaches Poll (11/29). Miami did not play due to its last place finish in the ACC during the 2009–2010 season.

== Season ==
The non-conference portion of the 2010–11 NCAA Division I men's basketball season began on November 8, 2010, with Illinois defeating UC Irvine in the opening round of the 2010 Coaches Vs. Cancer Classic. Conference play began on December 27, 2010, with Penn State traveling to play Indiana in Bloomington, Indiana.

On December 17, 2010, the Big Ten Commissioner Jim Delany announced that Michigan State head coach Tom Izzo would serve a one-game suspension for what the National Collegiate Athletic Association determined was a "inadvertent secondary recruiting violation".

On March 1, Jon Diebler tied the Big Ten record with 10 made three-point shots as Ohio State clinched a share of the Big Ten championship in a victory over Penn State. On March 6, they clinched the title outright in a victory over Wisconsin. Ohio State achieved 34 victories, marking the highest total by a conference member since the 2006–07 Buckeyes went 35–4 and the 34–3 record was the conference's highest winning percentage (.919) since the 2004–05 Illinois Fighting Illini went 37–2 (.948).

The Big Ten's 12,826-fans average attendance led the nation the 35th consecutive season by more than 1,500 fans more than the next-closest conference. It was the 19th consecutive year the Big Ten achieved two million attendanees. Its seven top 25 average attendance schools surpassed all other conferences by at least three. The following schools were among the top 25 Wisconsin (7th, 17,230), Illinois (10th, 15,851), Indiana (12th, 15,259), Ohio State (13th, 15,125), Michigan State (15th, 14,797), Purdue (17th, 13,916), Minnesota (24th, 13,241). Other top-5 conferences were Big East (11,323), SEC (11,187), Big 12 (10,716), and ACC (10,266).

== Player of the week ==
Players of the week

Throughout the conference regular season, the Big Ten offices named a player of the week each Monday.

Week	Player of the week	Freshman of the week
11-15-10	John Shurna, NU	Jared Sullinger, OSU
11-22-10	Trevor Mbakwe, MINN	Jared Sullinger (2), OSU
11-22-10	Jared Sullinger, OSU	Jared Sullinger (2), OSU
11-29-10	Kalin Lucas, MSU	Deshaun Thomas, OSU
12-06-10	Jon Leuer, WIS	Jared Sullinger (3), OSU
12-13-10	Jared Sullinger (2), OSU	Jared Sullinger (4), OSU
12-20-10	John Shurna (2), NU	Jared Sullinger (5), OSU
12-27-10	Darius Morris, MICH	Jared Sullinger (6), OSU
01-03-11	Demetri McCamey, ILL	Jared Sullinger (7), OSU
01-03-11	E'Twaun Moore, PUR	Jared Sullinger (7), OSU
01-10-11	Jared Sullinger (3), OSU	Jared Sullinger (8), OSU
01-10-11	Ryne Smith, PUR	Jared Sullinger (8), OSU
01-17-11	Draymond Green, MSU	Aaron Craft, OSU
01-24-11	Jared Sullinger (4), OSU	Jared Sullinger (9), OSU
01-31-11	Darius Morris (2), MICH	Jared Sullinger (10), OSU
01-31-11	Talor Battle, PSU	Jared Sullinger (10), OSU
02-07-11	Jon Leuer (2), WIS	Jared Sullinger (11), OSU
02-14-11	Jordan Taylor, WIS	Tim Hardaway Jr., MICH
02-22-11	E'Twaun Moore (2), PUR	Tim Hardaway Jr. (2), MICH
02-28-11	JaJuan Johnson, PUR	Tim Hardaway Jr. (3), MICH
03-07-11	Jon Diebler, OSU	Jared Sullinger (12), OSU

== Honors and accolades ==
On February 3, 2011, Michigan's Zack Novak (District 4), Northwestern's Drew Crawford (District 5) and Minnesota's Blake Hoffarber (District 5) were selected by CoSIDA as among the forty Academic All-District players, making them finalists for fifteen Academic All-American selections later in the month. Hoffarber was named as a second team Academic All-American. The conference also had 37 Academic All-Conference Team selections.

Jared Sullinger and JaJuan Johnson were among the ten finalists for the Oscar Robertson Trophy. Demetri McCamey, Sullinger, Johnson E'Twaun Moore and Jon Leuer were Naismith Award Midseason Top 30 List selections. McCamey and Jordan Taylor are Bob Cousy Award finalists. Sullinger was among the five finalists for the Wayman Tisdale Award. Moore, Leuer and David Lighty were selected among the ten Lowe's Senior CLASS Award finalists.

=== Conference honors ===
Two sets of conference award winners were recognized by the Big Ten - one selected by league coaches and one selected by the media.

Honor	Coaches	Media
Player of the Year	JaJuan Johnson, PUR	JaJuan Johnson, PUR
Coach of the Year	Matt Painter, PUR	Matt Painter, PUR
Freshman of the Year	Jared Sullinger, OSU	Jared Sullinger, OSU
Defensive Player of the Year	JaJuan Johnson, PUR	None Selected
Sixth Man of the Year	Aaron Craft, OSU	None Selected
All Big Ten First Team	Jared Sullinger, OSU	Jared Sullinger, OSU
All Big Ten First Team	JaJuan Johnson, PUR	JaJuan Johnson, PUR
All Big Ten First Team	E'Twaun Moore, PUR	E'Twaun Moore, PUR
All Big Ten First Team	Jordan Taylor, WIS	Jordan Taylor, WIS
All Big Ten First Team	Jon Leuer, WIS	Talor Battle, PSU
All Big Ten Second Team	Kalin Lucas, MSU	Kalin Lucas, MSU
All Big Ten Second Team	Trevor Mbakwe, MINN	Trevor Mbakwe, MINN
All Big Ten Second Team	William Buford, OSU	William Buford, OSU
All Big Ten Second Team	David Lighty, OSU	David Lighty, OSU
All Big Ten Second Team	Talor Battle, PSU	Jon Leuer, WIS
All Big Ten Third Team	Demetri McCamey, ILL	Demetri McCamey, ILL
All Big Ten Third Team	Darius Morris, MICH	Darius Morris, MICH
All Big Ten Third Team	Draymond Green, MSU	Draymond Green, MSU
All Big Ten Third Team	Michael Thompson, NU	Michael Thompson, NU
All Big Ten Third Team	Jon Diebler, OSU	Jon Diebler, OSU
All Big Ten Third Team	John Shurna, NU	
All Big Ten Honorable Mention	Mike Davis, ILL	Mike Davis, ILL
All Big Ten Honorable Mention	Melsahn Basabe, IOWA	Melsahn Basabe, IOWA
All Big Ten Honorable Mention	Tim Hardaway Jr., MICH	Tim Hardaway Jr., MICH
All Big Ten Honorable Mention	Jeff Brooks, PSU	Jeff Brooks, PSU
All Big Ten Honorable Mention	Lewis Jackson, PUR	Lewis Jackson, PUR
All Big Ten Honorable Mention	Keaton Nankivil, WIS	Keaton Nankivil, WIS
All Big Ten Honorable Mention		Mike Tisdale, ILL
All Big Ten Honorable Mention		Bryce Cartwright, IOWA
All Big Ten Honorable Mention		Blake Hoffarber, MINN
All Big Ten Honorable Mention		John Shurna, NU
All Big Ten Honorable Mention		Aaron Craft, OSU
All-Freshman Team	Jereme Richmond, ILL	Not Selected
All-Freshman Team	Melsahn Basabe, IOWA	Not Selected
All-Freshman Team	Tim Hardaway Jr., MICH	Not Selected
All-Freshman Team	Aaron Craft, OSU	Not Selected
All-Freshman Team	Jared Sullinger, OSU	Not Selected
All Defensive Team	Delvon Roe, MSU	Not Selected
All Defensive Team	Aaron Craft, OSU	Not Selected
All Defensive Team	David Lighty, OSU	Not Selected
All Defensive Team	JaJuan Johnson, PUR	Not Selected
All Defensive Team	Jordan Taylor, WIS	Not Selected

=== NABC ===
The National Association of Basketball Coaches announced their Division I All-District teams on March 9, recognizing the nation's best men's collegiate basketball student-athletes. Selected and voted on by member coaches of the NABC, 245 student-athletes, from 24 districts were chosen. The selection on this list were then eligible for the State Farm Coaches' Division I All-America teams. The following list represented the Big Ten players chosen to the list. Since the Big Ten Conference was its own district, this is equivalent to being named All-Big Ten by the NABC.

First Team

- JaJuan Johnson Purdue
- Jared Sullinger Ohio State
- Jordan Taylor Wisconsin
- Jon Leuer Wisconsin
- Talor Battle Penn State
Second Team
- E'Twaun Moore Purdue
- William Buford Ohio State
- David Lighty Ohio State
- Darius Morris Michigan
- Trevor Mbakwe Minnesota

=== USBWA ===
On March 10, the U.S. Basketball Writers Association released its 2010–11 Men's All-District Teams, based on voting from its national membership. There were nine regions from coast to coast, and a player and coach of the year were selected in each. The following lists all the Big Ten representatives selected within their respective regions.

District II (NY, NJ, DE, DC, PA, WV)
- Talor Battle, Penn State
District V (OH, IN, IL, MI, MN, WI)

Player of the Year

- JaJuan Johnson, Purdue

Coach of the Year

- Matt Painter, Purdue

All-District Team

- JaJuan Johnson, Purdue
- Jon Leuer, Wisconsin
- Kalin Lucas, Michigan State
- Demetri McCamey, Illinois
- E'Twaun Moore, Purdue
- Jared Sullinger, Ohio State
- Jordan Taylor, Wisconsin
District VI (IA, MO, KS, OK, NE, ND, SD)

None Selected

=== National postseason honors ===
Jordan Taylor, Jon Leuer, Jared Sullinger, JaJuan Johnson, E'Twaun Moore were among the 20 players on the final ballot for the John R. Wooden Award.

Johnson and Sullinger were named first team 2011 NCAA Men's Basketball All-Americans by the United States Basketball Writers Association (USBWA). They were also first team selections by Sporting News and Associated Press who also selected Jordan Taylor to their second teams. The National Association of Basketball Coaches named Johnson and Sullinger to its first team and Taylor and Moore to its third team. The Associated Press named Talor Battle, Jon Leuer, and E'Twaun Moore as honorable mention selections. No other conference had 2 first-team selections by USBWA, Sporting News and AP, and the Big Ten was the only conference with three on the first or second AP and Sporting News teams.

Sullinger won the Wayman Tisdale Award as the USBWA's National Freshman of the Year and Sporting News' Freshman of the Year. Sullinger, Aaron Craft, Jereme Richmond and Tim Hardaway Jr. were among the 21 players selected to the 2011 Collegeinsider.com Freshmen All-America team.

Following the season four players were invited to the June 17 – 24, 2011 17-man tryouts for the 12-man 2011 FIBA Under-19 World Championship team by USA Basketball: Hardaway (UofM), Keith Appling (MSU), Melsahn Basabe (Iowa) and Meyers Leonard (Ill.). The 12 selected players will compete as Team USA in the 2011 FIBA U19 World Championships in Latvia from June 30 – July 10, 2011. Appling, Hardaway and Leonard made the final roster.

Matt Painter coached Team USA to a 5th-place finish in the 2011 World University Games. The team included Trevor Mbakwe and Draymond Green.

== Postseason ==
With 8 invitations to either the 2011 NCAA Men's Division I Basketball Tournament or 2011 National Invitation Tournament for its 11 schools, the Big Ten Conference had the highest combined percentage of competitors (72.7%) of all conferences in these two tournaments.

=== Big Ten tournament ===
Ohio State won the 2011 Big Ten Conference men's basketball tournament behind Tournament most outstanding player, Jared Sullinger as repeat Big Ten men's basketball tournament champions. Finalist Penn State was attempting to be the first school to win the championship by winning 4 games since the 2000–01 Iowa Hawkeyes did so in the 2001 Big Ten Conference men's basketball tournament.

=== NCAA tournament ===
The Big Ten Conference landed 7 2011 NCAA Men's Division I Basketball Tournament invitations, including the overall number 1 seed in the tournament, Ohio State, who is making its 23rd appearance and 3rd consecutive. Purdue (3 seed, 24th and 5th consecutive appearance), Wisconsin (4 seed, 17th and 13th consecutive appearance), Michigan (8 seed, 18th appearance, first since 2009), Illinois (9 seed, 29th appearance, first since 2009), Penn State (10 seed, 9th appearance, first since 2001) and Michigan State (10 seed, 25th and 14th consecutive appearance) also received bids. Seven NCAA bids tied the conference record (1990 and 2009). The opening Friday of the tournament marked the first time that the Big Ten has ever gone 4–0 on a day in the tournament. This marked the fourth consecutive season that the Big Ten had at least 2 Sweet Sixteen participants (Ohio State and Wisconsin).

Team	Bid Type	Seed	Results
Ohio State	Automatic	1	Won vs. #16 UTSA 75–46; Won vs. #8 George Mason 98–66; Lost vs. #4 Kentucky 62–60
Purdue	At-large	3	Won vs. #14 Saint Peter's 65–43; Lost vs. #11 VCU 94–76
Wisconsin	At-large	4	Won vs. #13 Belmont 72–58; Won vs. #5 Kansas State 70–65; Lost vs. #8 Butler 61–54
Michigan	At-large	8	Won vs. #9 Tennessee 75–45; Lost vs. #1 Duke 73–71
Illinois	At-large	9	Won vs. #8 UNLV 73–62; Lost vs. #1 Kansas 73–59
Penn State	At-large	10	Lost vs. #7 Temple 66–64
Michigan State	At-large	10	Lost vs. #7 UCLA 78–76

=== National Invitation tournament ===
Northwestern's NIT invitation gave it the schools third consecutive postseason invitation, a school record.

Team	Bid Type	Seed	Results
Northwestern	At-large	4	Won vs. #5 Milwaukee 70–61; Won vs. #1 Boston College 85–67; Lost vs. #2 Washington State 69–66 (OT)

=== Other tournaments ===
The Big Ten did not have any entrants in the other post season tournaments.

=== 2011 NBA draft ===
The following All-Big Ten performers were listed as seniors: JaJuan Johnson, E'Twaun Moore, Talor Battle, David Lighty, Jon Leuer, Demetri McCamey, Jon Diebler, and Michael Thompson
Darius Morris has sought the advice of the NBA's undergraduate advisory committee to determine his draft prospects. On May 4, Morris announced his final decision not to withdraw his name prior to the May 8 deadline and to enter the June 23, 2011 NBA draft.
The following were Big Ten underclassmen, who declared early for the 2011 draft: Darius Morris, Jereme Richmond, Ralph Sampson III, John Shurna.
The following were Big Ten underclassmen who entered their name in the draft but who did not hire agents and opted to return to college:Ralph Sampson III & John Shurna.

A total of five Big Ten players were selected in the 2011 NBA draft: JaJuan Johnson (1st round, 27th overall), Jon Leuer (2nd round, 40th overall), Darius Morris (2nd round, 41st overall), Jon Diebler (2nd round, 51st overall), and E'Twaun Moore (2nd round, 55th overall).

Round	Pick	Player	Position	Nationality	Team	School/club team
1	27	JaJuan Johnson	PF	United States	New Jersey Nets (from L.A. Lakers,^{[h]} traded to Boston)^{[E]}	Purdue (Sr.)
2	40	Jon Leuer	PF	United States	Milwaukee Bucks	Wisconsin (Sr.)
2	41	Darius Morris	PG	United States	Los Angeles Lakers (from Golden State via New Jersey)^{[h]}	Michigan (So.)
2	51	Jon Diebler	SG	United States	Portland Trail Blazers	Ohio State (Sr.)
2	55	E'Twaun Moore	SG	United States	Boston Celtics	Purdue (Sr.)

==== Draft-day trades ====
- ^{E 1} The New Jersey Nets acquired the draft rights to 25th pick Marshon Brooks from the Boston Celtics in exchange for the draft rights to 27th pick JaJuan Johnson and a 2014 second-round draft pick.

==== Pre-draft trades ====
- ^{h 1} ^{2} On December 15, 2010, the New Jersey Nets acquired Sasha Vujačić and a 2011 first-round draft pick from the Los Angeles Lakers, while the Lakers acquired Joe Smith, Golden State's 2011 and Chicago's 2012 second-round draft picks from the Nets in a three-team trade with the Lakers and the Houston Rockets. Previously, the Nets acquired a 2011 second-round draft pick from the Golden State Warriors as a compensation for delaying the sending of the 2011 conditional first-round draft pick to at least 2012. In the original trade on July 22, 2008, the Nets acquired a 2011 conditional first-round draft pick on July 22, 2008, from the Golden State Warriors in exchange for Marcus Williams.
