= E'Twaun Moore =

American basketball player (born 1989)

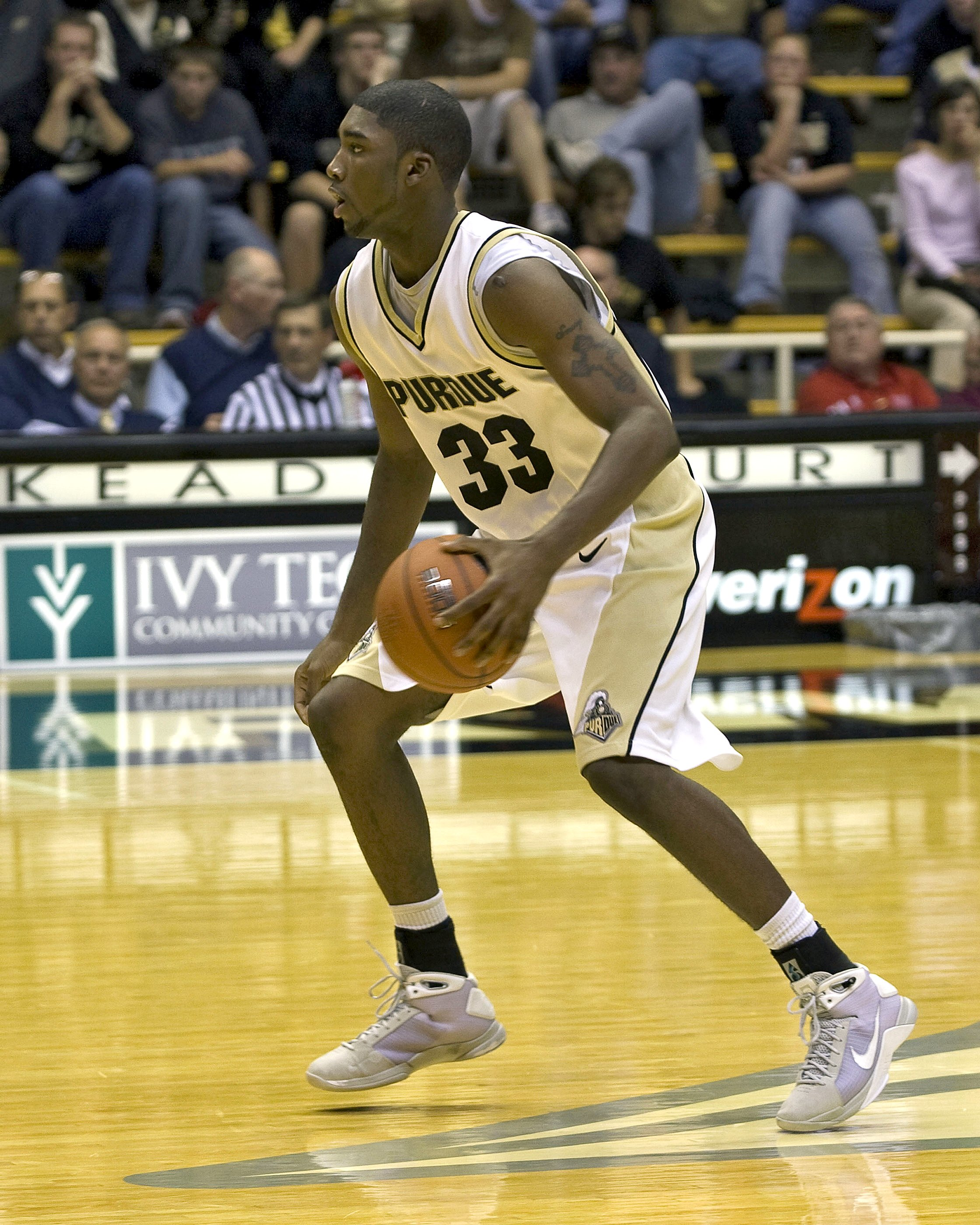
- Moore with Purdue in 2008

Chicago Bulls
- Title: Scout
- League: NBA

Personal information
- Born: February 25, 1989 (age 37) East Chicago, Indiana, U.S.
- Listed height: 6 ft 3 in (1.91 m)
- Listed weight: 191 lb (87 kg)

Career information
- High school: Central (East Chicago, Indiana)
- College: Purdue (2007–2011)
- NBA draft: 2011: 2nd round, 55th overall pick
- Drafted by: Boston Celtics
- Playing career: 2011–2021
- Position: Shooting guard
- Number: 55

Career history
- 2011: Universo Treviso Basket
- 2011–2012: Boston Celtics
- 2012–2014: Orlando Magic
- 2014–2016: Chicago Bulls
- 2016–2020: New Orleans Pelicans
- 2020–2021: Phoenix Suns

Career highlights
- Third-team All-American – NABC (2011); 2× AP honorable mention All-American (2010, 2011); 2× First-team All-Big Ten (2010, 2011); 2× Second-team All-Big Ten (2008, 2009); Big Ten All-Freshman team (2008); Third-team Parade All-American (2007)
- Stats at NBA.com
- Stats at Basketball Reference

E'Twaun Donte Moore (born February 25, 1989) is an American former professional basketball player who is a scout for the Chicago Bulls of the National Basketball Association (NBA). He was drafted by the Boston Celtics in the 2011 NBA draft after playing college basketball for the Purdue Boilermakers. In high school, he led East Chicago's Central High School to an IHSAA state championship.

He was a second-team All-Big Ten selection as both a freshman and a sophomore and a first-team All-Big Ten selection as a junior and a senior for Purdue Boilermakers men's basketball. He was a two-time Academic All-Big Ten selection, as well as a second-team Academic All-American selection at the conclusion of the 2009–10 Big Ten Conference regular season. As a junior, as well, he was named a Yahoo! Sports third-team All-American and an AP honorable mention All-American. He repeated as an AP honorable mention selection and was named NABC third-team All-America as a senior.

After being selected by the Celtics in the second round of the 2011 NBA draft, Moore made his NBA debut in December 2011. He was traded in July 2012 to the Orlando Magic as part of a three-team deal, with whom he played for the 2012–13 and 2013–14 seasons. In September 2014, Moore signed with the Bulls, with whom he played for two seasons. He signed with the New Orleans Pelicans in 2016, playing for the team through the 2019–20 season. While with the Pelicans, he scored a career-high 36 points in a game against the Houston Rockets in December 2017. Moore played for the Phoenix Suns during the 2020–21 season, during which the team made the NBA Finals. He re-signed with the Magic for the 2021–22 season, but suffered a preseason knee injury and was waived without playing a game for the team. In 2024, the Bulls hired him as a scout.

== High school career ==
Moore played high school basketball at Central High School in East Chicago, where he averaged 21.2 points, 5.5 rebounds and 3.3 assists per game during his senior year. That same season, along with 6 ft 11 in (2.11 m) teammate Ángel García and future Carolina Panther Kawann Short, Moore led his team to the 2007 Indiana High School Athletic Association 4A State Championship, scoring 28 points against Indianapolis North Central High School, which starred 2007 Indiana Mr. Basketball and current NBA player, Eric Gordon. Moore earned the tournament's Trester Award. Moore was named to the Indiana All-Star Team, and was also honored as a third-team Parade All-American.

=== Recruiting ===
Moore was ranked as the number eight high school basketball shooting guard in the nation by Scout.com. Rivals.com ranked him as the number seven shooting guard in the nation, the second best player in Indiana (after Gordon) and the 35th best player in the nation. Hoopmaster.com ranked him as the 26th best player in the nation, sixth best shooting guard and second best hoosier. ESPN evaluated him as a point guard and rated him as the 4th best point guard and 20th best player in the nation.

He received scholarship offers from Illinois, Indiana, Iowa, Miami, Tennessee, and Virginia Tech. Following Indiana's struggles with head coach, Mike Davis' resignation, Purdue swept the best talent from the Indiana class of 2007. Moore was expected to make the transition to the next level and contribute immediately. As a top 40 recruit, he joined Robbie Hummel, Scott Martin and JaJuan Johnson as part of the nations number 5 and 6 ranked recruiting class according to Scout.com and Rivals.com, respectively. Moore, Hummel and Martin were teammates in the Amateur Athletic Union (AAU) basketball program and were united with Johnson on the Indiana State All-Star squad.

College recruiting information
Name	Hometown	School	Height	Weight	Commit date
E'Twaun Moore; SG/PG	East Chicago, Indiana	Central High School (IN)	6 ft 3 in (1.91 m)	170 lb (77 kg)	Jul 14, 2006
E'Twaun Moore; SG/PG	Recruit ratings: Scout: Rivals: (97)				
Overall recruit ranking: Scout: 8 (SG) Rivals: 35, 7 (SG), 2 (IN) ESPN: 20, 4 (PG)
Note: In many cases, Scout, Rivals, 247Sports, On3, and ESPN may conflict in their listings of height and weight.; In these cases, the average was taken. ESPN grades are on a 100-point scale.; Sources: "Purdue Basketball Commitments". Rivals.; "2007 Purdue Basketball Commits". Scout.; "ESPN". ESPN.; "Scout.com Team Recruiting Rankings". Scout.; "2007 Team Ranking". Rivals.

== College career ==
=== Freshman season (2007–2008) ===
Moore attended Purdue University to play under head coach Matt Painter. He became roommates with fellow freshman teammate, Robbie Hummel, and shared a common bathroom with JaJuan Johnson and Scott Martin. On February 4, 2008, Moore was named co-Big Ten Player of the Week for his efforts against the Iowa Hawkeyes and the Illinois Fighting Illini on January 30 and February 2. He led the "baby boilers" in scoring with 12.9 points a game, becoming the first true freshman in Boilermaker history to lead in that category. He broke the Purdue freshmen record with most three point field goals made with 66. Chris Lutz had previously set the record for the 2006 team when he finished with 53. He also reached second place among Purdue Freshmen in total points scored with 437 behind Russell Cross' 540. Moore helped lead Purdue to a 2nd straight NCAA tournament appearance, losing to a senior-led Xavier team in the Second Round after defeating the Baylor Bears, and led the Boilers to a 25–9 overall record. He was named a Second Team All-Big Ten selection, while selected to the Big Ten All-Freshmen Team.

=== Sophomore season (2008–2009) ===
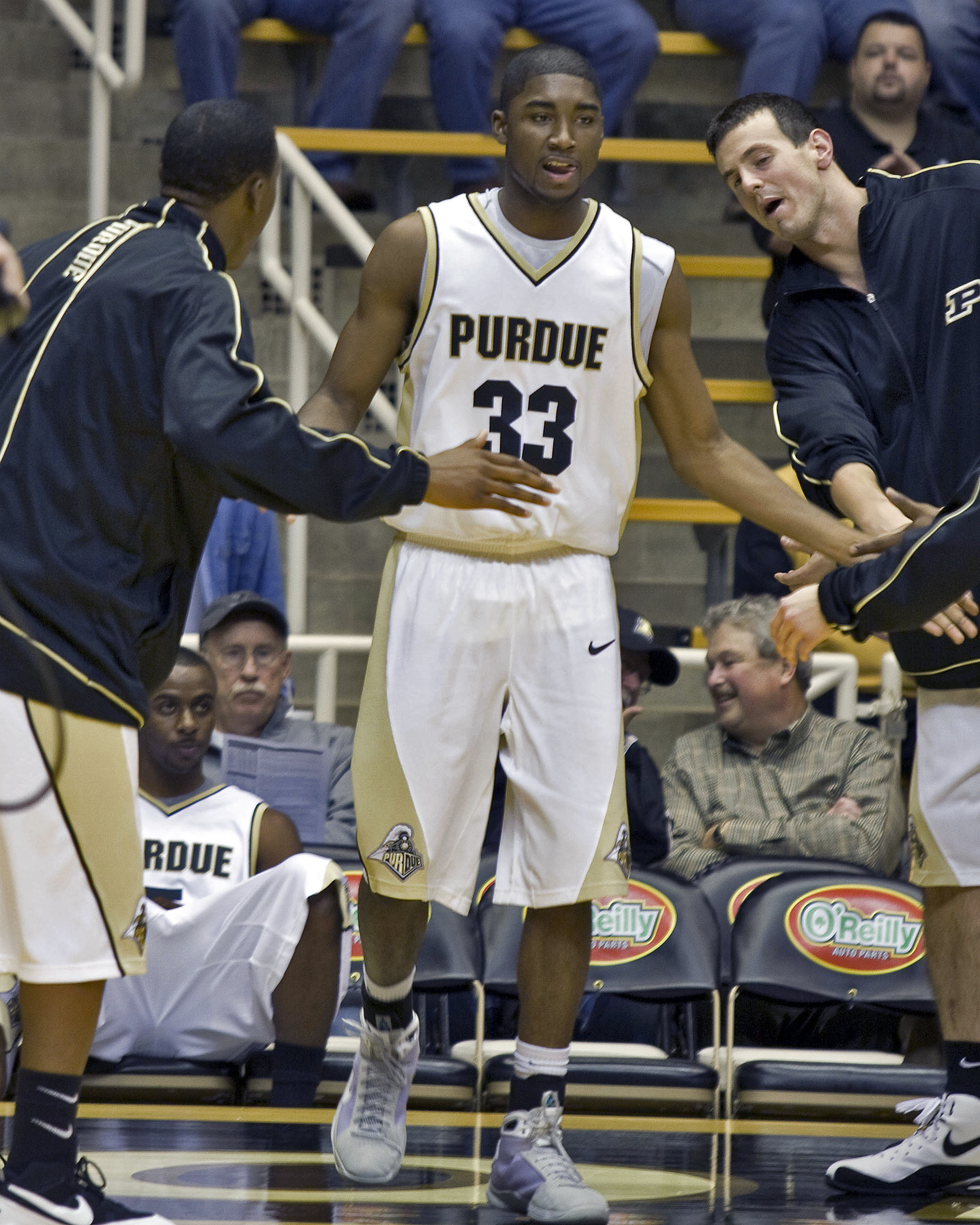
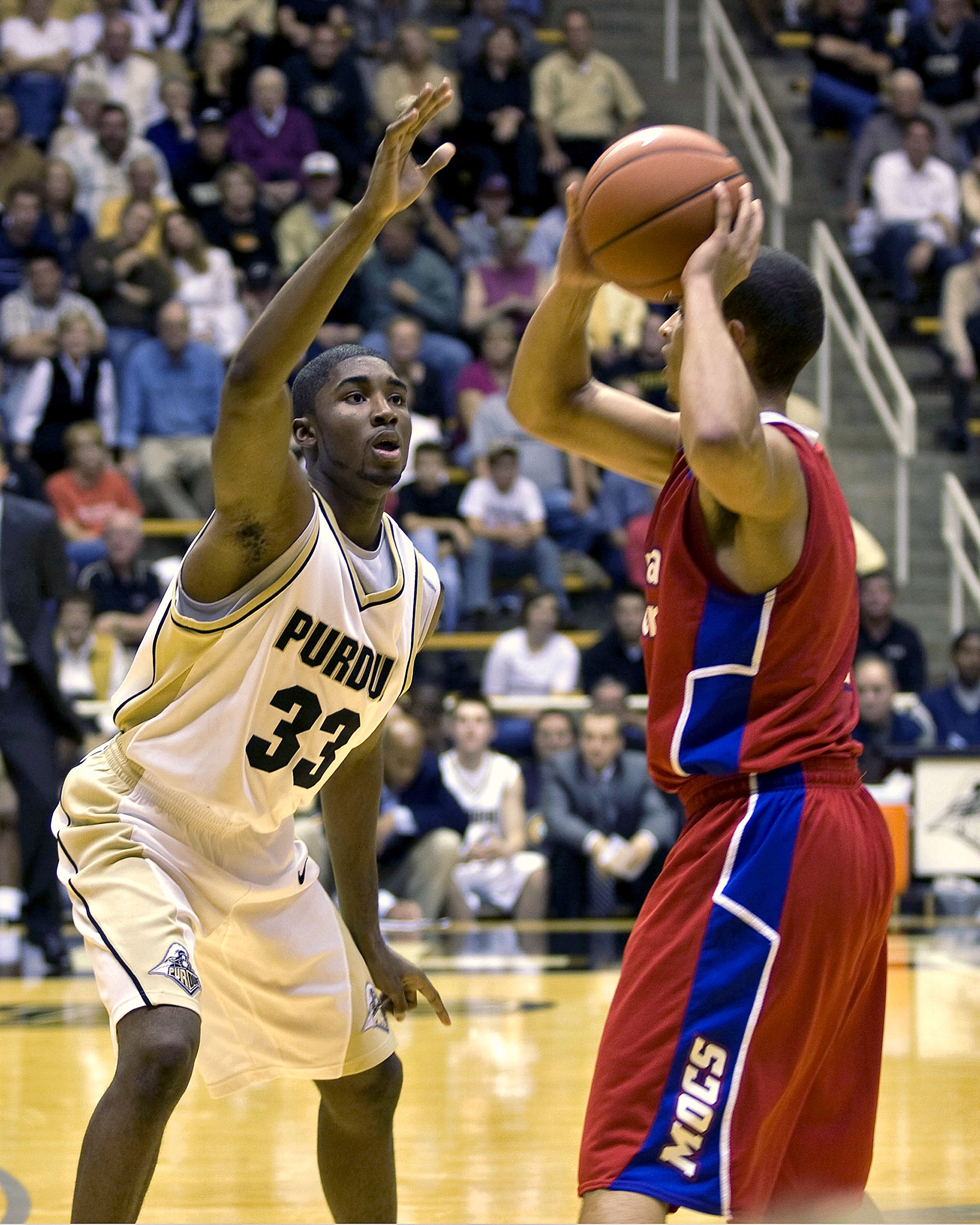
Moore in the October 31, 2008 exhibition game

Moore finished his sophomore season for the 2008–09 Boilermakers as the leading scorer for the team again and ranked second in assists as well as third in rebounds. He earned his second conference player of the week award on December 1, 2008, following his performance in the final week of the 2008 NIT Season Tip-Off, where he helped Purdue finish second in the 16-team field. In the semifinals at Madison Square Garden, he led the team to a 71–64 victory of Boston College with 19 points. Then, in the championship game, he helped the team reach overtime against Oklahoma despite Blake Griffin's double double by scoring 22 points. He scored in double figures 30 times (23–7), including three 20+ point performances (1–2). He helped lead the Boilers to an 11–2 preseason record and an 11–7 record in conference play. Moore scored a season high 26 points against Indiana and recorded two double-doubles in league play. He was named Second Team All-Big Ten. He was also recognized as a Conference All-Academic selection. He helped lead Purdue to its first Big Ten tournament championship in school history and was one of three Boilers to be named to the all-conference tournament team. Moore then led them to the program's 2009 NCAA tournament, its third straight appearance and onto its first Sweet Sixteen appearance in 9 years. Moore played in 1,222 minutes on the season, the second most in school history behind Joe Barry Carroll's 1,235 in the 1979–80 season. The 37 games in which he appeared in is a season-school record, which he shares with JaJuan Johnson, Marcus Green and Keaton Grant.

=== Junior season (2009–2010) ===
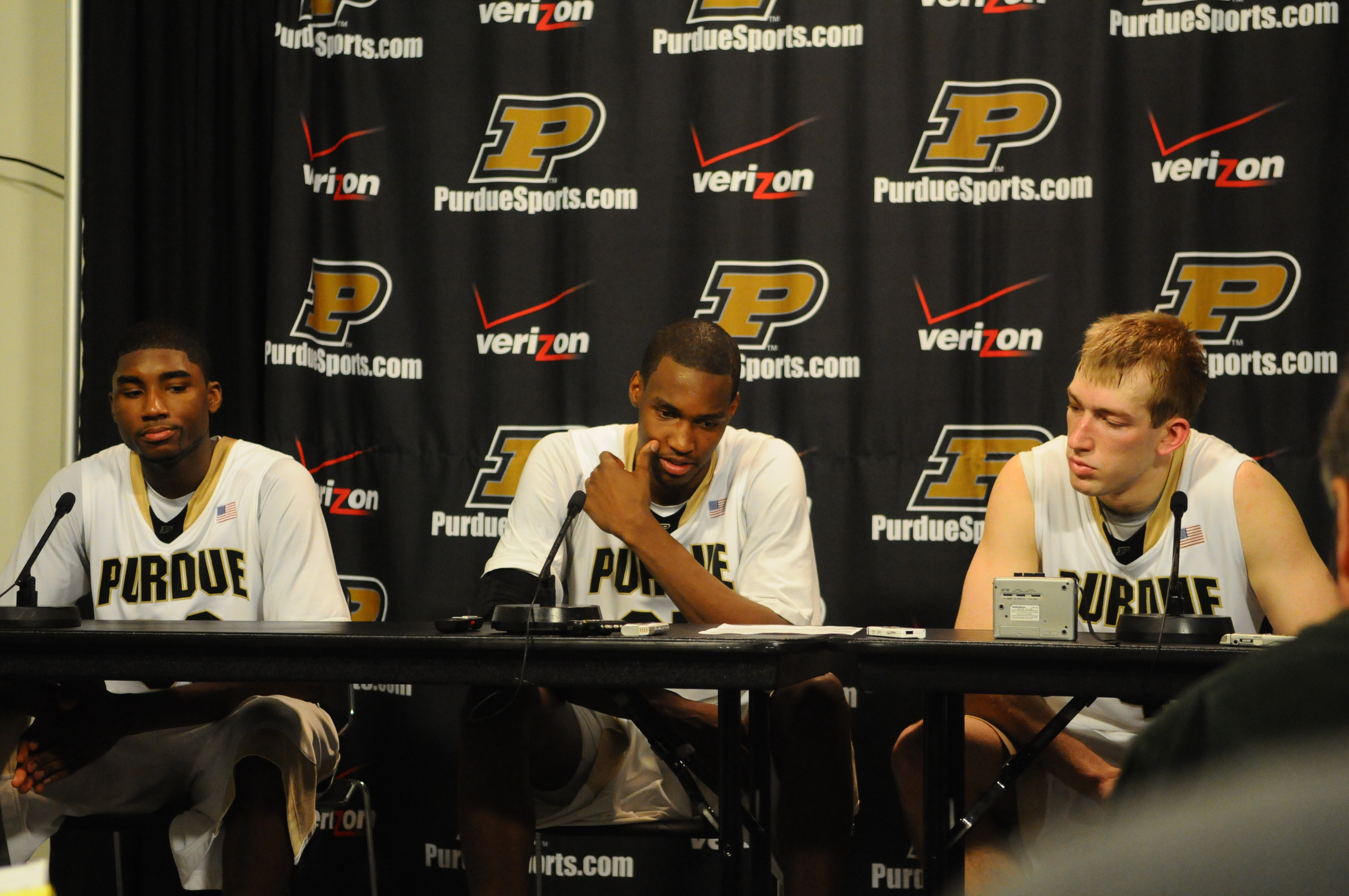
Moore, JaJuan Johnson and Robbie Hummel at press conference, January 2010

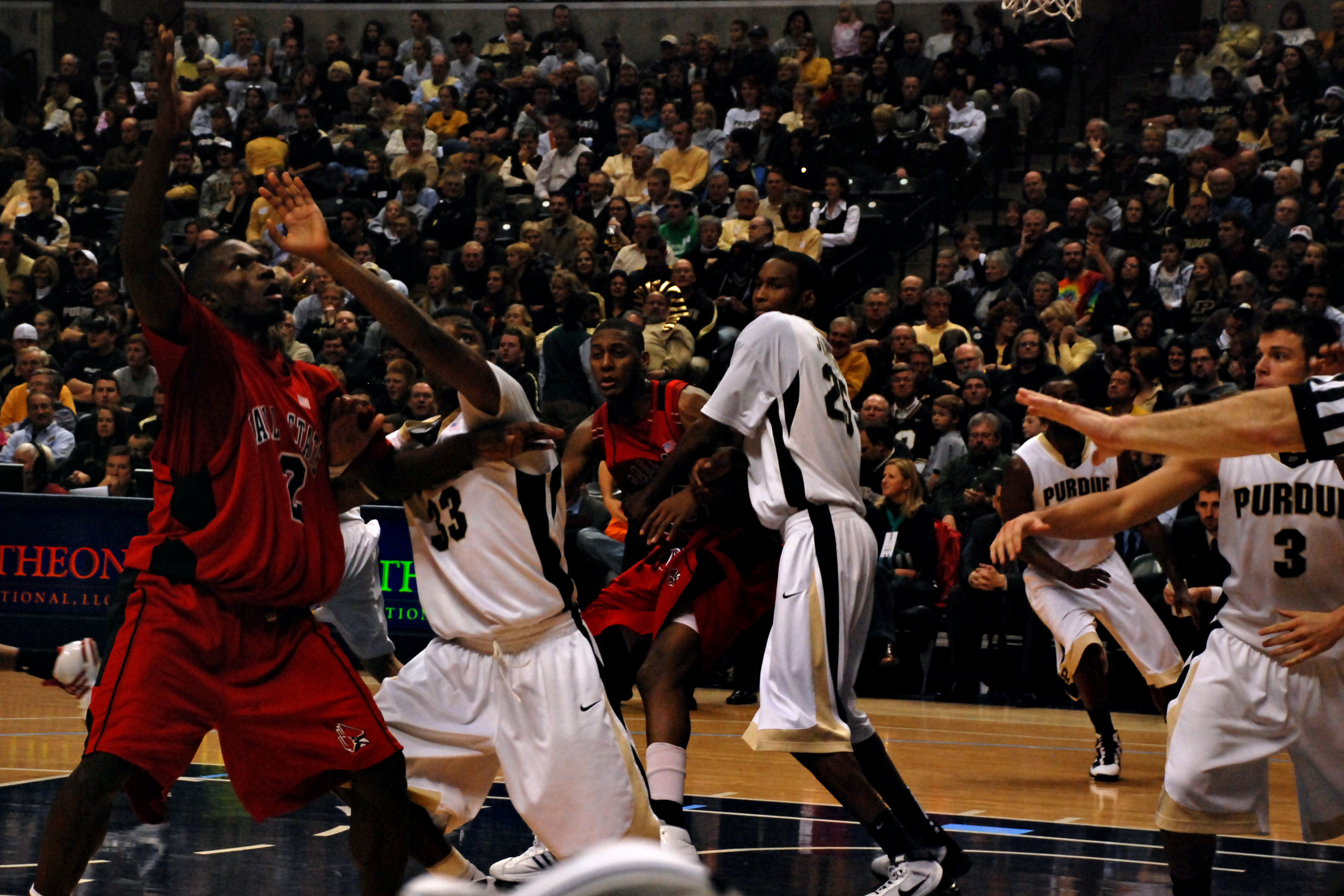
Moore, JaJuan Johnson and Chris Kramer on defense, December 2009

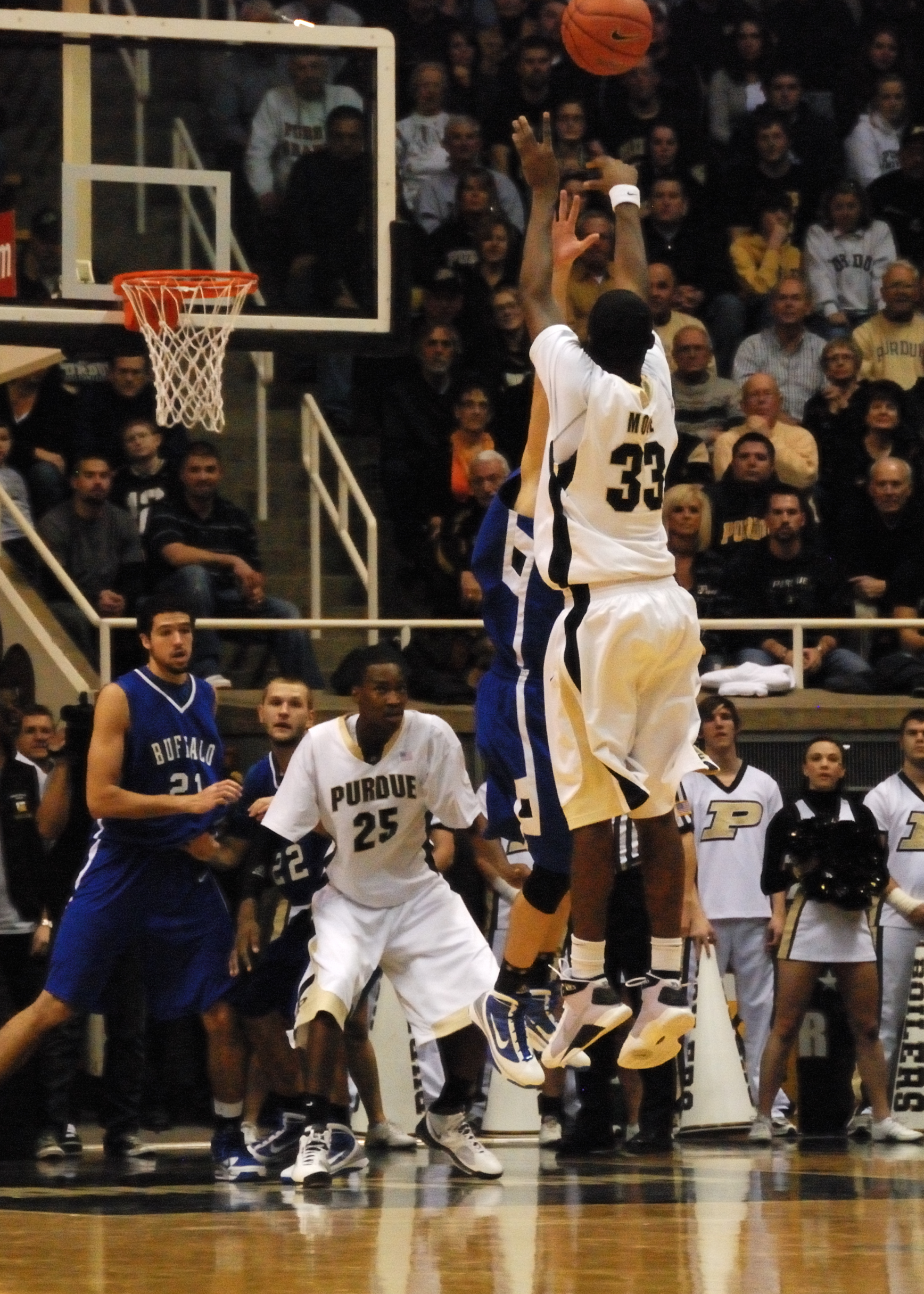
Moore shoots against Buffalo. December 2009

To start the 2009–10 season, Moore was named a preseason candidate for the John R. Wooden Award along with teammate, Robbie Hummel. With a 22-point performance against Tennessee and being named the 2009 Paradise Jam tournament MVP, he became the 43rd Boilermaker to score his 1,000th career point. He helped lead Purdue to a 14–0 season start, which tied the Glenn Robinson-led 1993–94 team as the best start in school history. He was named to the District 5 First Team Academic All-District Team, as selected by ESPN The Magazine and College Sports Information Directors of America, making him one of 40 finalists for the 15-man Academic All-American team, in which he was eventually selected as a Second Team Academic All-American. Moore had a 28-game double-digit scoring streak that extended from November 20 – March 3. The streak consisted of eight 20+ point performances, which included a career high 28 points on March 12, 2010, in the quarterfinals of the 2009 Big Ten Conference men's basketball tournament against Northwestern. Leading Purdue in scoring with 16.5 points a game and shooting beyond the arc at 34.3 percent, he was also second on the team with 2.7 assists per outing behind Lewis Jackson's 3.5 mark. With a 14–4 record in conference play, Moore helped Purdue to its share of the first Big Ten Conference regular season title in fourteen years. Moore was named a First Team All-Big Ten selection by both the coaches and the media at the conclusion of the regular season. He was selected by the U.S. Basketball Writers Association to the 10-man All-District V team covering college basketball players in the states of Ohio, Indiana, Illinois, Michigan, Minnesota, and Wisconsin. Moore was a Third-Team All-American selection by Yahoo! Sports and an Honorable Mention All-American by the Associated Press., while being recognized as an All-District First-Team selection by the National Association of Basketball Coaches. Moore led Purdue to a 4 seed in the NCAA tournament, culminating with a consecutive Sweet Sixteen after beating Siena and Texas A&M. Eventually losing to Duke for the second time in his career, he led Purdue to a 29–6 record, which tied for the most season wins in school history. He concluded the season sixth in the Big Ten Conference in scoring (teammates Hummel and Johnson finished seventh and eighth) and ninth in steals. With 93 assists to go along with his scoring, he is only the third boilermaker to lead the team in total points and assists since Larry Weatherford did in the 1970–1971 season. He is the first person to lead the team in scoring three straight seasons since Troy Lewis did in the late 80s. He earned repeat recognition as an Academic All-Big Ten selection.

=== Senior season (2010–2011) ===
After being named First Team All-Big Ten in his junior season, Moore decided to enter the 2010 NBA draft along with teammate JaJuan Johnson. On the deadline of May 8, both players decided to pull out of the draft and return for their senior seasons. Moore began his senior season as a Preseason First Team All-Big Ten selection by the Big Ten media for the 2010–11 Big Ten Conference men's basketball season., a preseason top 50 candidate for the Wooden Award and a candidate for the Lowe's Senior CLASS Award. On November 26, 2010, Moore recorded his first 30-point game performance when he scored 31 points by going 9 of 18 from the floor against Southern Illinois. Moore had another 31 point performance New Year's Eve against Northwestern, which included a career-high of 7 made three-point field goals in a game. He recorded season highs of 7 assists against Alcorn State on November 17, 9 rebounds (4 times), and 4 steals against Austin Peay. On January 3, he was named Co-Big Ten Player of the Week. In early-mid January, Moore went cold, making only 15 of his 57 shot attempts from the floor, while not attempting a single free throw in four games (2–2). On February 20, Moore led #11 Purdue with a career-high 38 points over #3 Ohio State, which included a career-high 7 three-point field goals, while scoring his 2,000th career point. The performance earned Moore Big Ten Player of the Week recognition. Moore was named one of ten finalists for the Lowe's Senior Class Award, as well as selected to both the midseason Naismith Award and midseason Wooden Award top-30 lists. Moore helped lead #9 Purdue to a 2nd-place finish in conference play with a 14–4 record and 25–6 overall. Moore was again selected for the First-Team All-Big Ten along with teammate JaJuan Johnson. Moore was also a National Association of Basketball Coaches (NABC) Division I District 7 All‐District second team choice. Since the Big Ten Conference was its own district, this is equivalent to being named second team All-Big Ten by the NABC. Moore was selected by the United States Basketball Writers Association to its 2010–11 Men's All-District Team. Moore was among the 20 players on the final ballot for the John R. Wooden Award. Moore finished his senior year averaging career highs of 18 points (2nd on team), 5.1 rebounds (2nd), 3.2 assists (2nd), and .5 blocks. He shot 44.7 from the floor, 71 percent from the line, and 40 percent from beyond the arc. He scored 20+ points in eleven games, including three 30+ point games. The National Association of Basketball Coaches named Moore a third team All-American Selection, and he was picked as a Third Team All-American by Fox Sports. The Associated Press named Moore an honorable mention.

=== Career notes ===
E'Twaun Moore became the third player in Big Ten history to tally 2,000 points (2,136), 500 rebounds (611), and 400 assists (400) in a career. He left Purdue being the third highest scorer, trailing only Rick Mount and Joe Barry Carroll, although he has since been passed by Zach Edey. At the close of his collegiate career, Moore was tied for program records for wins (107) and games played (140), and he held the Purdue career records for most minutes played (4,517), three-point field-goals made (243), and games started (136), although he three-point field goal record has since been surpassed by Dakota Mathias and Carsen Edwards. He led Purdue in scoring in each of his first three seasons (2008, 2009, 2010). Moore had career averages of 15.3 points, 4.4 rebounds, 2.9 assists, 1.2 steals, .4 blocks, and shot 44 percent from the field, 73 percent from the line, and 38 percent beyond the arc during his time at Purdue.

== Professional career ==
=== Benetton Treviso (2011) ===
Moore was selected with the 55th overall in the 2nd round of the 2011 NBA draft by the Boston Celtics. Due to the lockout, Moore signed a deal with Italy's Benetton Treviso that featured an opt-out clause that let him return to the Celtics once the lockout ended.

=== Boston Celtics (2011–2012) ===
On December 9, 2011, Moore signed a guaranteed contract with the Celtics. He debuted briefly (for less than 1 minute) in the Celtics' season-opener against the New York Knicks on Christmas Day. He posted his first rebound and assist on December 28 against the Charlotte Bobcats. He scored his first points on January 4, 2012, against the New Jersey Nets. He got significant minutes for the first time in a game against the Indiana Pacers at Bankers Life Fieldhouse in his home state, when he played 20 minutes. In the subsequent weeks with Keyon Dooling and Sasha Pavlović injured he often received a significant amount of playing time. He recorded 16 points on January 26, 2012, against the Orlando Magic, going 4–4 from distance. On April 24, Moore established a career high of 7 rebounds against the Miami Heat.

=== Orlando Magic (2012–2014) ===
On July 20, 2012, Moore was traded to the Houston Rockets in a three team deal between the Celtics, Rockets and Portland Trail Blazers that sent Moore, JaJuan Johnson, Sean Williams and Jon Diebler to the Rockets, Courtney Lee to the Celtics and Sasha Pavlović to the Trail Blazers. He was waived by the Rockets shortly afterwards. On September 6, 2012, he signed with the Orlando Magic. With Jameer Nelson and Hedo Türkoğlu beginning the season injured for the 2012–13 Orlando Magic, Moore began the 2012–13 NBA season as a starter. Moore posted a career-high 17 points on November 6, 2012, against the Chicago Bulls. He topped this with 18 points on November 6 against the Brooklyn Nets. Nelson returned to the starting lineup on November 16 after missing the first six games of the season. On December 28, Moore suffered an elbow sprain when he and Cartier Martin landed on his arm during a loose ball scramble against the Washington Wizards. The injury made his status day-to-day. Moore was unable to play the following night. He did not practice with the team again until January 13. Moore returned to the lineup the following day. He again scored 18 points to tie his career high on January 28 against the Detroit Pistons. When Nelson incurred a bruised left forearm, Moore returned to the starting lineup on February 2 against the Milwaukee Bucks. As a starter on February 4, he again tied his career high with 18 points against Philadelphia 76ers. Although Nelson returned to the starting lineup after two starts, JJ Redick was injured prior to the game on February 4 and Arron Afflalo continued to be injured, necessitating Moore's continued role as a starter. On February 13, both Redick and Afflalo returned to the lineup, relegating Moore to a reserve role. On February 21, the Magic traded away Redick, and Nelson was diagnosed with a strained left knee patella tendon. Thus, Moore returned to the starting lineup on February 22. On March 1, Moore posted a career-high 11 assists against the Houston Rockets. On March 5, Nelson returned to the starting lineup.

For the first 15 games of the 2013–14 NBA season, Nelson started at point guard for the Orlando Magic, but on November 29, he missed the game due to injury. Victor Oladipo moved from shooting guard to point guard, while Moore became the starting shooting guard against the San Antonio Spurs. Moore missed some action due to injury with the game against Sacramento on December 21. He returned to the lineup three games later on December 29. On February 18 against the Milwaukee Bucks, Moore had 17 points and 2 blocks, which were season highs. Moore tied his season high of 17 points on 6-for-6 shooting, including 5-for-5 on three point shots on April 9 against the Brooklyn Nets.

=== Chicago Bulls (2014–2016) ===
On September 18, 2014, Moore signed with the Chicago Bulls. With injuries sidelining Derrick Rose, Jimmy Butler and Taj Gibson on March 5, 2015, Moore scored a career-high 19 points and hit the game winning three-point shot with 2.1 seconds remaining to help the Bulls defeat the Oklahoma City Thunder 108–105. On January 14, 2016, with Rose again sidelined, Moore scored Chicago's first 7 points in overtime as the Bulls overcame both a 24-point deficit and a 4-point overtime deficit to defeat the Philadelphia 76ers. Starting in place of Butler on February 3, Moore posted a career-high 24 points, including 13 points on 5-for-5 shooting in the first half, against the Sacramento Kings. On February 21 against the Los Angeles Lakers, Moore scored 24 points again on the night that Kobe Bryant made his farewell visit to the United Center.

=== New Orleans Pelicans (2016–2020) ===
On July 21, 2016, Moore signed with the New Orleans Pelicans. Moore began the season with a 10-point performance as a starter in his debut for the Pelicans on October 26, 2016, against the Denver Nuggets, but missed a game-tying three point shot attempt with 24 seconds left.

On November 13, 2017, Moore tied a career high with 24 points in a 106–105 win over the Atlanta Hawks. On December 4, 2017, he set a new career high with 27 points in a 125–115 loss to the Golden State Warriors. On December 11, 2017, he had a career-high 36 points and made a career-best six 3-pointers in a 130–123 loss to the Houston Rockets. On April 4, 2018, he scored 30 points and made a career-high seven 3-pointers in 10 attempts in a 123–95 win over the Memphis Grizzlies.

On November 12, 2018, Moore scored a season-high 30 points in a 126–110 win over the Toronto Raptors. He then scored 31 points on November 14 against Minnesota.

Moore's role varied for the 2019–20 New Orleans Pelicans. He witnessed the final 7 games of the team's 13-game losing streak from the bench. His December return to the main rotation coincided with the team winning 5 of 6 contests, which included a 4-game winning streak in which he averaged 23 minutes of play (over 9 minutes per fourth quarter) and scored many important points.

=== Phoenix Suns (2020–2021) ===
On November 30, 2020, Moore signed with the Phoenix Suns. After playing in only two games around the start of the season, Moore started receiving more playing time with the Suns, starting with their January 27, 2021 against the Oklahoma City Thunder. Moore eventually received a start on February 8 with Chris Paul out due to a sore right hamstring, scoring a season-high 17 points with 4 assists in 39:41 minutes of action for a 119–113 win over the Cleveland Cavaliers. The Suns made it to the 2021 NBA Finals, but lost to the Milwaukee Bucks in 6 games.

On September 8, 2021, Moore signed with the Orlando Magic, returning to the franchise for his second stint with the team. He suffered a sprained left knee during the preseason. On February 10, 2022, Moore was waived by the Magic before appearing in a game for them, following the trade for Bol Bol.

== NBA career statistics ==
Legend
GP	Games played	GS	Games started	MPG	Minutes per game
FG%	Field goal percentage	3P%	3-point field goal percentage	FT%	Free throw percentage
RPG	Rebounds per game	APG	Assists per game	SPG	Steals per game
BPG	Blocks per game	PPG	Points per game	**Bold**	Career high
*	Led the league

=== Regular season ===
Year	Team	GP	GS	MPG	FG%	3P%	FT%	RPG	APG	SPG	BPG	PPG
2011–12	Boston	38	0	8.7	.387	.378	**1.000**	.9	.9	.3	.1	2.9
2012–13	Orlando	75	21	22.4	.396	.340	.797	2.2	**2.7**	.7	.3	7.8
2013–14	Orlando	79	3	19.1	.428	.354	.765	1.7	1.4	.8	.2	6.3
2014–15	Chicago	56	0	9.0	.446	.342	.600	.8	.6	.4	.1	2.7
2015–16	Chicago	59	22	21.4	.481	**.452**	.629	2.3	1.7	.6	.3	7.5
2016–17	New Orleans	73	22	24.9	.457	.370	.770	2.1	2.2	.7	**.4**	9.6
2017–18	New Orleans	**82***	**80**	**31.5**	**.508**	.425	.706	**2.9**	2.3	**1.0**	.1	**12.5**
2018–19	New Orleans	53	36	27.6	.481	.432	.763	2.4	1.9	.8	.2	11.9
2019–20	New Orleans	56	6	18.2	.426	.377	.689	2.3	1.4	.6	.2	8.3
2020–21	Phoenix	27	1	14.4	.455	.314	.857	1.7	1.5	.6	.2	4.9
Career		598	191	21.0	.455	.388	.742	2.0	1.8	.7	.2	7.9

=== Playoffs ===
Year	Team	GP	GS	MPG	FG%	3P%	FT%	RPG	APG	SPG	BPG	PPG
2012	Boston	**9**	0	2.3	.250	.000	.500	.3	.3	.0	**.1**	.6
2015	Chicago	3	0	3.0	.333	**1.000**	—	1.0	.0	**.7**	.0	1.7
2018	New Orleans	**9**	**9**	**31.6**	**.466**	.360	**.688**	**2.6**	**1.7**	**.7**	**.1**	**11.3**
2021	Phoenix	7	0	6.6	.444	.200	—	1.4	1.3	.1	.0	2.4
Career		28	9	12.9	.442	.333	.667	1.4	1.0	.3	.1	4.6

== Post-playing career ==
The day after he was waived by the Orlando Magic, Moore was contacted by his cousin who works as a developer about an opportunity to invest in the development of Dallas Executive Airport; he estimates that his involvement in the project as an investor will yield more money than his NBA career. His business portfolio also includes ownership of two McAlister's Deli restaurants, an executive transportation company in Orlando, and real estate in Indiana, New Orleans and Texas.

In 2024, Moore was hired as a scout by the Chicago Bulls.

== Personal life ==
Moore was born in East Chicago, Indiana to parents Ezell and Edna Moore. He has a brother, Ezell and a sister, Ekeisha.
