= Darius Morris =

American basketball player (1991–2024)

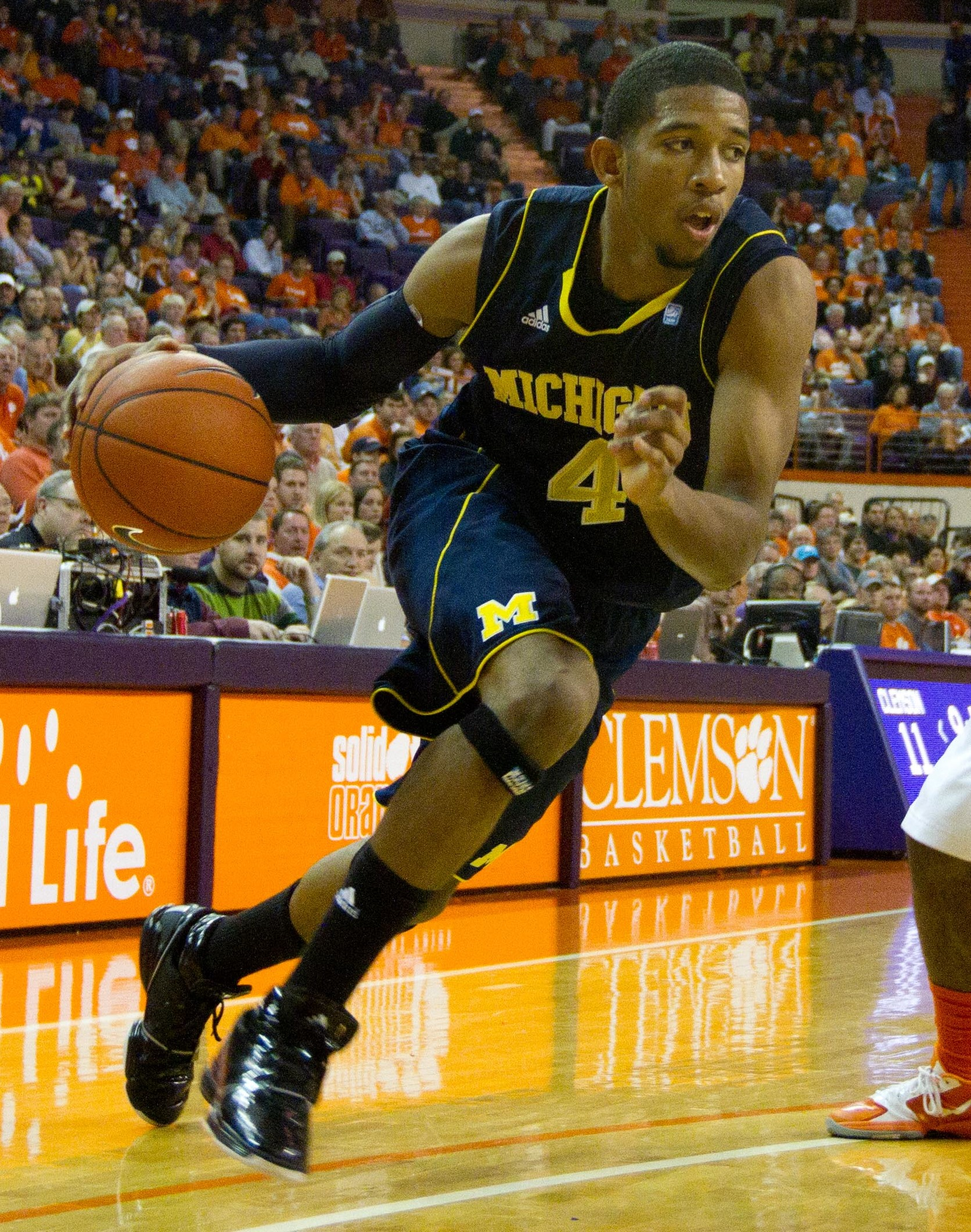
- Morris for the Michigan Wolverines in 2010

Personal information
- Born: January 3, 1991 Los Angeles, California, U.S.
- Died: May 2, 2024 (aged 33) Greater Los Angeles, California, U.S.
- Listed height: 6 ft 4 in (1.93 m)
- Listed weight: 195 lb (88 kg)

Career information
- High school: Windward School (Los Angeles, California)
- College: Michigan (2009–2011)
- NBA draft: 2011: 2nd round, 41st overall pick
- Drafted by: Los Angeles Lakers
- Playing career: 2011–2020
- Position: Point guard
- Number: 1, 7, 14

Career history
- 2011–2013: Los Angeles Lakers
- 2012–2013: →Los Angeles D-Fenders
- 2013: Philadelphia 76ers
- 2014: Los Angeles Clippers
- 2014: Memphis Grizzlies
- 2014: Rio Grande Valley Vipers
- 2014–2015: Brooklyn Nets
- 2016–2018: Rio Grande Valley Vipers
- 2018: Guangdong Southern Tigers
- 2018–2019: Santa Cruz Warriors
- 2019–2020: BC Enisey
- 2020: BCM Gravelines-Dunkerque

Career highlights
- Third-team All-Big Ten (2011)
- Stats at NBA.com
- Stats at Basketball Reference

Darius Aaron Morris (January 3, 1991 – May 2, 2024) was an American professional basketball player. Morris was selected as the 41st pick in the 2011 NBA draft by the Los Angeles Lakers and played the point guard position. He also played for the Brooklyn Nets, Philadelphia 76ers, Los Angeles Clippers and Memphis Grizzlies of the NBA as well as the Los Angeles D-Fenders and Rio Grande Valley Vipers of the NBA D-League. He also played overseas in China, Russia and France.

Morris spent two seasons playing college basketball with the Michigan Wolverines. While playing for the 2010–11 team, he was the Big Ten assists leader and set the Michigan single-season assist record (since broken by Trey Burke). He earned third team All-Big Ten honors his sophomore season.

Prior to attending Michigan, Morris led Windward School to the 2009 California state championship while earning the California Interscholastic Federation (CIF) Division 5A State John Wooden High School Player of the Year Award. He was a 2010–11 All-Big Ten 3rd team selection by the coaches and the media. The National Association of Basketball Coaches named him as a 2nd team All-District selection for the district composed of Big Ten schools.

== Early life ==
Morris was raised in Carson, California. In high school, Morris, the son of Dewayne Sr. and Robin Morris, attended Windward School. As a brash freshman, Morris promised the media that he would be able to dunk and lead Windward to a state championship before he graduated.

== High school career ==
Morris was invited to numerous All-star basketball camps hosted by LeBron James, Steve Nash, the National Basketball Players Association and Nike. He was twice selected as a first-team All-State player in California. He was also named the MVP of numerous tournaments and invited to participate in numerous all-star games, including the Academic All-American Classic. Morris's father worked for the United States Postal Service office in Venice.

As a senior, Morris led Windward High School to the California Division V state title, posting a game-high 25 points, eight rebounds and four assists in the championship game. Darius Morris was named the MVP of Olympic League, CIF Division 5A Southern Section Player of Year, and CIF Division 5A State Player of Year. Also Darius was awarded a John Wooden High School Player of the Year Award, received by Jrue Holiday the year before. He was ranked as the 11th, 15th and 20th best high school basketball point guard in the nation by ESPN, Rivals.com and Scout.com, respectively. Rivals and ESPN included him on their lists of best overall basketball players at 77th and 100th, respectively.

College recruiting
Name	Hometown	School	Height	Weight	Commit date
Darius Morris; PG	Los Angeles, California	Windward School (CA)	6 ft 4 in (1.93 m)	190 lb (86 kg)	Nov 8, 2008
Darius Morris; PG	Recruit ratings: Scout: Rivals: (90)				
Overall recruit ranking: Scout: 20 (PG) Rivals: 77, 15 (PG) ESPN: 100, 11 (PG)
Note: In many cases, Scout, Rivals, 247Sports, On3, and ESPN may conflict in their listings of height and weight.; In these cases, the average was taken. ESPN grades are on a 100-point scale.; Sources: "Michigan 2009 Basketball Commitments". Rivals.; "2009 Michigan Basketball Commits". Scout.; "ESPN". ESPN.; "Scout.com Team Recruiting Rankings". Scout.; "2009 Team Ranking". Rivals.

== College career ==
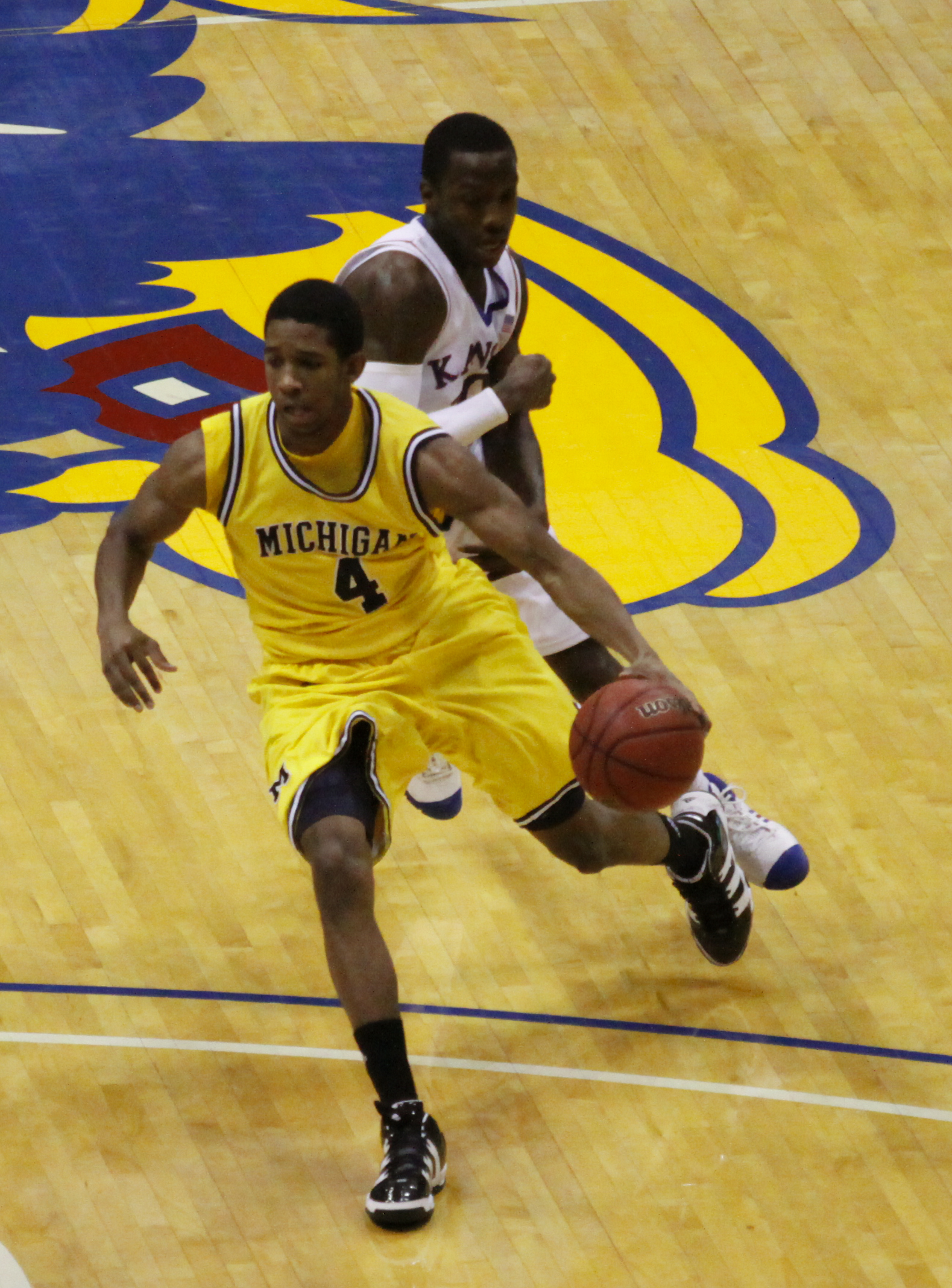
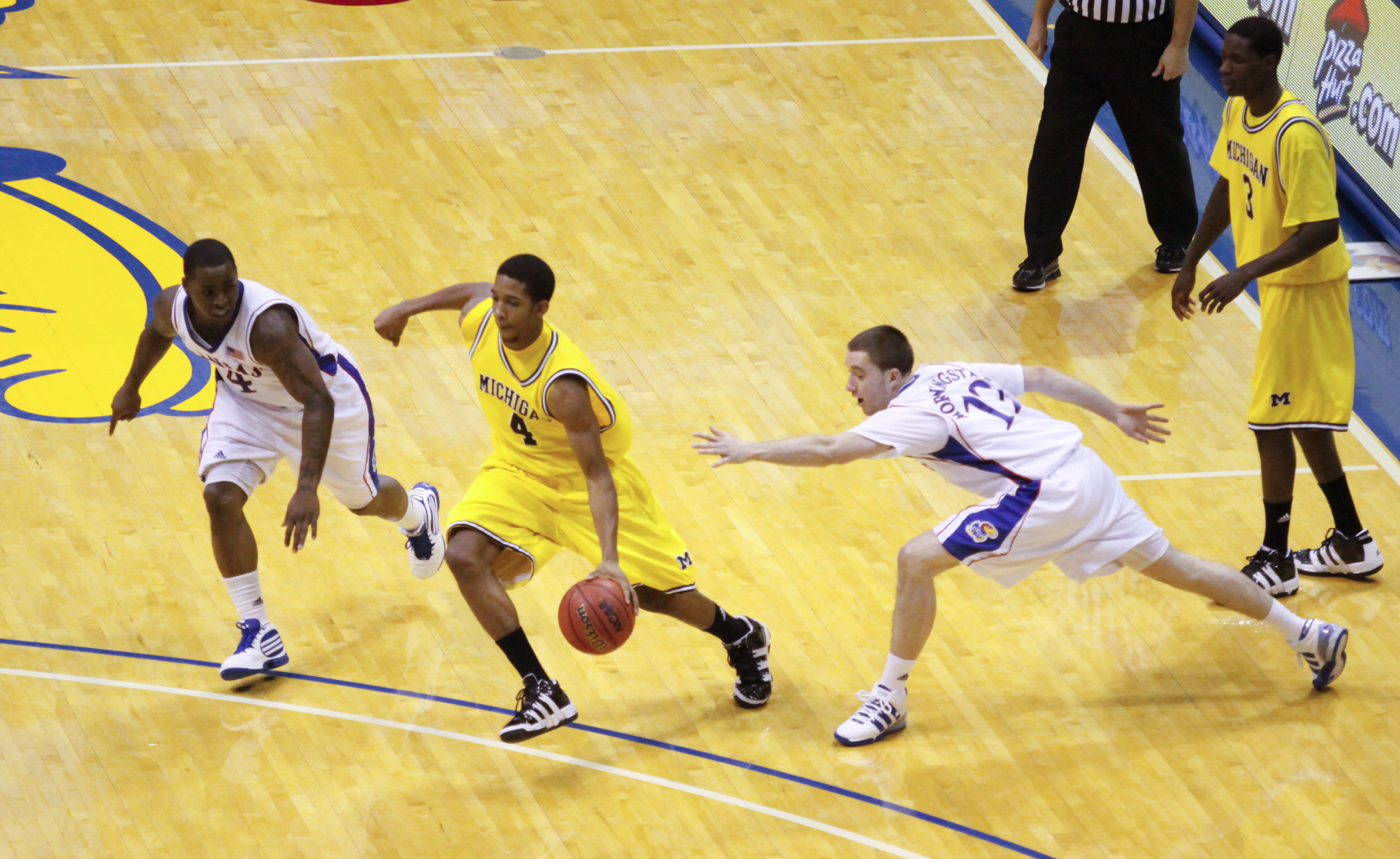
Morris against the 2009–10 Kansas Jayhawks, December 19, 2009

As a freshman with the 2009–10 team, Morris averaged 4.4 points and 2.6 assists per game in 24.3 minutes of playing time per game. On November 14, Morris began the season for #15 ranked Wolverines in the starting lineup, posting 11 points and 5 assists against Northern Michigan. He had a season-high 7 assists against Northwestern on January 10, 2010.

On December 23, 2010, Morris was one of three Wolverines to make 4 three-point shots as the team set a school single-game record by making 16 against Bryant University. He also had 12 assists on his way to a double-double. On December 27, 2010, the Big Ten Conference named Morris player of the week. Ann Arbor media felt his omission from the 67-man 2011 Bob Cousy Award watchlist was a surprise. Morris repeated as (co-)player of the week on January 31, 2011, sharing the award with Talor Battle, after becoming the third Michigan Wolverines men's basketball player (following Gary Grant and Manny Harris) to record a triple-double. On February 1, 2011, The Wall Street Journal calculated that Morris was by far the most valuable player to his team among major conference players because his combined assists and field goals account for over 53% of his team's points.

Morris established a new Michigan single-season assists record during the 2011 NCAA Division I men's basketball tournament (235 in 35 games). The previous highest single-season assists totals in Michigan history were by Gary Grant (234 in 34 games, 1987–88) and Rumeal Robinson (233 in 37 games, 1988–89). His average of 6.71 assists per game led the Big Ten Conference. For the season, Morris also led the 2010–11 team in points per game and steals per game.

Following the 2010–11 Big Ten Conference men's basketball season, Darius Morris was selected as a third team All-Big Ten selection by both the conference's coaches and the conference's media. Morris was also a National Association of Basketball Coaches (NABC) Division I District 7 All‐District second team choice. Since the Big Ten Conference is its own district, this is equivalent to being named second team All-Big Ten by the NABC.

Following the season, Morris sought the advice of the NBA's undergraduate advisory committee to determine his draft prospects. On May 4, Morris announced his final decision not to withdraw his name prior to the May 8 deadline and to enter the June 23, 2011, NBA draft.

== Professional career ==
=== 2011–12 season ===
ESPN's Chad Ford described Morris at 6 feet 5 inches (1.96 m) as the biggest true point guard in the draft. Morris was selected by his hometown Los Angeles Lakers in the second round of the 2011 NBA draft with the 41st overall selection. In the week prior to the beginning of the 2011–12 NBA season, Morris appeared along with teammates Derek Fisher, Steve Blake and Matt Barnes on the December 22 season 1 finale of The X Factor during a performance by 50 Cent. On January 11, he played 13 minutes against Utah in his first game for the Lakers, contributing his first four points, his first two assists and first rebound. The game went to overtime and marked the Lakers' first road victory of the season in four attempts. Morris began seeing action as Blake endured a costrochaondral fracture of the cartilage that connects the rib to the sternum in subsequent games. Morris stayed in the main rotation for seven games during Blake's rib injury before returning to a limited role. On March 7, 2012, Morris was assigned to the Los Angeles D-Fenders of the NBA D-League. Morris debuted for the Defenders with 21 points on March 10. He was recalled by the Lakers on March 16, 2012. On April 26, against the Sacramento Kings in the last game of the regular season, Morris tallied 9 points and 5 assists.

=== 2012–13 season ===
Morris agreed to re-sign with the Lakers on July 2, 2012, and was named to the Lakers team for the July 13–22 Las Vegas NBA Summer League. During the Summer League, Morris led the Lakers in scoring and assists. On November 9, 2012, Darius Morris recorded 10 points, a career-high 5 rebounds, 5 assists, and 1 steal in a 101–77 Lakers win over the Golden State, backing up Blake, while Steve Nash was injured. On November 13, with both Blake and Nash injured, Morris made his first career start against the San Antonio Spurs. As a starter, Morris posted career highs of 31 minutes and 6 assists on November 16 against the Phoenix Suns. On December 4, Chris Duhon overtook Morris as the replacement starter. On December 16, Morris posted a career-high 15 points against the Philadelphia 76ers. A few nights later, Kobe Bryant praised him for his defensive effort. When Nash returned to the starting lineup on December 22, Morris started in place of Metta World Peace, who came off the bench. This was part of a common strategy employed by Lakers head coach Mike D'Antoni to play players out of position. While a starter, Morris's responsibility was to defend against the opponents' most dangerous perimeter player. On January 4, World Peace returned to the starting lineup in Morris's place. Then in late January, Jodie Meeks replaced Morris in the rotation as Blake also returned to the rotation.

On March 7, 2013, Morris was reassigned to the Los Angeles D-Fenders. He played for the D-Fenders on March 9, scoring 21 points and adding 6 rebounds, 2 assists and a steal. He was recalled on March 9, 2013. On April 3, 2013, the Lakers sent him to the D-Fenders once again. He was recalled the next day. On April 26 in the 2013 NBA playoffs against the San Antonio Spurs, with Bryant, Nash, Blake and Meeks sidelined, Morris had his best day as a pro, tallying 24 points and 6 assists in a starting role.

On June 28, the Lakers decided that they would not make Morris the $1.2 million qualifying offer prior to the July 1 deadline that would have been necessary to make him a restricted free agent. Although the team expressed interest in re-signing Morris at a lower-priced contract and having him represent the team again in the summer league, he would become an unrestricted free agent at the deadline because the qualifying offer was not made.

=== 2013–14 season ===
On September 27, 2013, Morris signed with the Philadelphia 76ers. As the September 28 training camp date approached, Morris was expected to battle with Tony Wroten for the backup point guard position behind Michael Carter-Williams. When Carter-Williams missed games, it was Wroten who moved into the starting lineup. On November 16, 2013, he scored an NBA regular season career-high 20 points along with 2 assists in a 135–98 loss to the New Orleans Pelicans. On November 20, 2013, he was waived by the 76ers as part of roster moves that included signing Elliot Williams and Lorenzo Brown and waiving Kwame Brown. In December, he was one of several guards to work out with the Memphis Grizzlies. That month, he was also considered by the Los Angeles Lakers when Kobe Bryant was injured since point guards Blake, Nash and Jordan Farmar were all injured. The Lakers, however, decided to sign Kendall Marshall who was averaging 19.4 points and 9.6 assists in the D-League at the time.

On January 6, 2014, Morris signed a 10-day contract with the Los Angeles Clippers after Chris Paul suffered a separated shoulder. Later that same day, Morris played his first game for the Clippers, logging 8 minutes off the bench in a 101–81 win over the Orlando Magic, and scoring his first point as a Clipper off a free throw. On January 16, Morris signed a second 10-day contract with the Clippers. On January 26, his second 10-day contract expired and the Clippers decided not to sign him for the rest of the season.

On February 3, 2014, Morris signed a 10-day contract with the Memphis Grizzlies. Mike Conley Jr. had been injured and Jerryd Bayless had been recently traded, leaving the team short at point guard. On March 17, 2014, Morris was acquired by the Rio Grande Valley Vipers of the NBA D-League. On March 20, he posted his first professional double-double with 21 points and 10 assists against the Bakersfield Jam. Morris posted 31 points on March 21 against the Austin Toros. On April 12, Morris posted 51 points and 18 assists in an overtime playoff loss to the Iowa Energy. The performance established a D-League single-game playoff record for assists and was the second-highest all-time single-game playoff point total.

=== 2014–15 season ===
In July 2014, Morris joined the San Antonio Spurs for the 2014 NBA Summer League. On September 24, 2014, he signed with the Portland Trail Blazers. However, he was later waived by the Trail Blazers on October 25, 2014. On December 11, 2014, the Brooklyn Nets made a two-for-one trade clearing a space on their roster. Morris signed with the team that day and made his debut for them the next day, recording two points and one assist in the 88–70 win over the Philadelphia 76ers. On June 29, he was waived by the Nets.

=== 2015–16 and 2016–17 seasons ===
On March 29, 2016, Morris was reacquired by the Rio Grande Valley Vipers. That night, he made his season debut in a 118–97 win over the Oklahoma City Blue, recording nine points, three rebounds, four assists and two steals in 24 minutes off the bench. Morris led the 2016–17 Vipers in scoring and assists during the regular season with 20.0 points and 6.4 assists per game. He also led the team with 23.3 points and 7.9 assists per game during the playoffs.

=== 2017–18 season ===
On January 5, 2018, Morris was conditionally signed by Guangdong Southern Tigers of the Chinese Basketball Association (CBA) to replace Edwin Jackson. On February 21, 2018, he did not renew his contract with the Guangdong Southern Tigers after the team signed Donald Sloan as the replacement. On March 21, Morris re-signed with the Rio Grande Valley Vipers.

=== 2018–19 season ===
On September 4, 2018, Morris was signed to join the New Orleans Pelicans for training camp. The Pelicans waived him on October 12. He then joined the Santa Cruz Warriors of the G League. On November 10, he posted a 25-point, 10-rebound, 10-assist triple-double against the Iowa Energy, which was his second G League triple double.

=== 2019–20 season ===
On August 20, 2019, he signed with BC Enisey of the VTB United League.

On January 12, 2020, he signed with BCM Gravelines-Dunkerque of the French league, LNB Pro A. He played seven games with this team until the basketball season was suspended due to the COVID-19 pandemic in France.

== Career statistics ==
Legend
GP	Games played	GS	Games started	MPG	Minutes per game
FG%	Field goal percentage	3P%	3-point field goal percentage	FT%	Free throw percentage
RPG	Rebounds per game	APG	Assists per game	SPG	Steals per game
BPG	Blocks per game	PPG	Points per game	**Bold**	Career high

=== NBA ===
==== Regular season ====
Year	Team	GP	GS	MPG	FG%	3P%	FT%	RPG	APG	SPG	BPG	PPG
2011–12	L.A. Lakers	19	0	8.9	.429	**.444**	.667	.8	1.1	.1	.0	2.4
2012–13	L.A. Lakers	**48**	**17**	14.2	.388	.364	.649	1.2	1.6	.4	.0	4.0
2013–14	Philadelphia	12	0	**16.1**	**.433**	.417	**.714**	1.1	**2.6**	**.7**	.0	**6.9**
2013–14	L.A. Clippers	10	0	5.4	.308	.000	.500	.5	.5	.2	.0	.9
2013–14	Memphis	5	0	13.2	.375	.286	.333	**1.6**	1.6	.6	.0	3.0
2014–15	Brooklyn	38	0	7.9	.340	.212	.444	.7	1.3	.2	.0	2.2
Career		132	17	11.1	.384	.322	.630	1.0	1.4	.3	.0	3.3

==== Playoffs ====
Year	Team	GP	GS	MPG	FG%	3P%	FT%	RPG	APG	SPG	BPG	PPG
2012	L.A. Lakers	**4**	0	2.0	**1.000**	**1.000**	.750	.0	.8	.0	.0	2.5
2013	L.A. Lakers	**4**	**2**	**26.3**	.457	.333	**.778**	**1.3**	**3.0**	**.5**	.0	**10.5**
2015	Brooklyn	1	0	5.0	.000	.000	.000	.0	.0	.0	.0	.0
Career		9	2	13.1	.487	.400	.769	.6	1.7	.2	.0	5.8

=== NBA D/G League ===
==== Regular season ====
Year	Team	GP	GS	MPG	FG%	3P%	FT%	RPG	APG	SPG	BPG	PPG
2011–12	Los Angeles	1	0	28.0	.438	.333	**.857**	1.0	4.0	1.0	.0	**21.0**
2012–13	Los Angeles	2	2	**35.0**	.355	.182	.545	**6.0**	5.5	1.0	.0	15.0
2013–14	Rio Grande	9	7	29.3	.508	.179	.641	4.3	6.7	.8	.0	17.1
2015–16	Rio Grande	3	0	28.3	.429	**.538**	.571	4.3	4.3	**1.7**	.0	13.7
2016–17	Rio Grande	**47**	**39**	33.7	.447	.330	.824	4.3	6.4	1.2	.0	20.0
2017–18	Rio Grande	3	2	26.3	**.538**	.500	.818	4.7	**7.7**	.3	.0	19.0
2018–19	Santa Cruz	34	25	29.4	.404	.295	.684	3.4	6.2	.7	**.2**	15.2
Career		99	75	31.4	.438	.314	.763	4.0	6.3	1.0	.1	17.8

==== Playoffs ====
Year	Team	GP	GS	MPG	FG%	3P%	FT%	RPG	APG	SPG	BPG	PPG
2014	Rio Grande	6	6	38.5	**.551**	**.474**	**.762**	**4.8**	**10.2**	1.0	**.2**	**30.0**
2016	Rio Grande	3	0	27.0	.227	.250	–	2.0	2.7	.7	.0	4.0
2017	Rio Grande	**9**	**9**	**41.3**	.458	.296	.675	4.4	7.9	**1.9**	.1	23.3
2018	Rio Grande	2	2	32.0	.400	.200	.750	4.5	6.0	1.0	.0	12.5
2019	Santa Cruz	2	2	29.0	.444	.273	.667	2.0	6.0	.5	.0	15.5
Career		22	19	36.6	.469	.333	.717	4.0	7.5	1.3	.1	20.8

==== College ====
*	Led NCAA Division I

Year	Team	GP	GS	MPG	FG%	3P%	FT%	RPG	APG	SPG	BPG	PPG
2009–10	Michigan	32	19	24.3	.406	.179	.630	1.8	2.6	.6	**.2**	4.4
2010–11	Michigan	**35**	**34**	**34.8**	**.489**	**.250**	**.715**	**4.0**	**6.7***	**1.0**	.0	**15.0**
Career		67	53	29.8	.469	.223	.695	2.9	4.8	.8	.1	9.9

== See also ==
- Michigan Wolverines men's basketball statistical leaders

== Death ==
Morris died in Los Angeles on May 2, 2024, at the age of 33. His cause of death was reported as coronary artery disease with drug and alcohol use as contributing factors. He was interred at Inglewood Park Cemetery.
