= John Shurna =

American basketball player (born 1990)

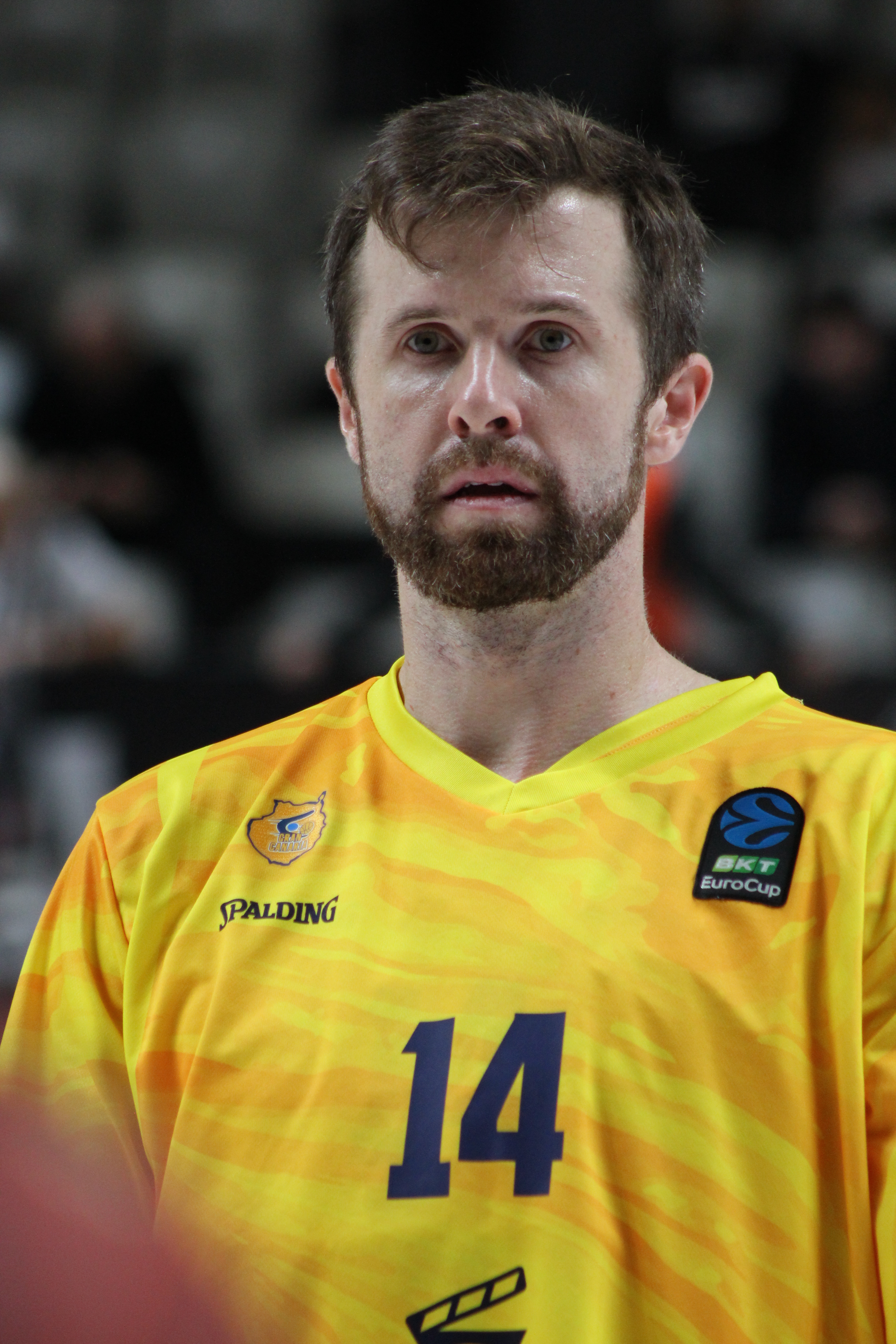
- Shurna with Gran Canaria in 2024

No. 22 – Força Lleida
- Position: Power forward
- League: Liga ACB

Personal information
- Born: April 30, 1990 (age 36) Glen Ellyn, Illinois, U.S.
- Listed height: 6 ft 9 in (2.06 m)
- Listed weight: 220 lb (100 kg)

Career information
- High school: Glenbard West (Glen Ellyn, Illinois)
- College: Northwestern (2008–2012)
- NBA draft: 2012: undrafted
- Playing career: 2012–present

Career history
- 2012–2013: Strasbourg IG
- 2013–2014: FIATC Joventut
- 2014–2015: Darüşşafaka
- 2015–2016: Valencia Basket
- 2016–2017: Cedevita Zagreb
- 2017–2019: Andorra
- 2019–2025: Herbalife Gran Canaria
- 2025–present: Força Lleida

Career highlights
- EuroCup champion (2023); EuroCup Finals MVP (2023); All-EuroCup First Team (2023); Croatian League champion (2017); Croatian Cup winner (2017); First-team All-Big Ten (2012); Second-team All-Big Ten (2010); Third-team All-Big Ten – Coaches (2011)
Medals
Men's basketball
Representing the United States
FIBA U-19 World Championship
Gold medal – first place	2009 New Zealand	Team

John William Shurna (born April 30, 1990) is an American–Lithuanian professional basketball player who plays for Força Lleida of the Spanish Liga ACB. He is the 2012 Big Ten scoring champion. He played in the 2012 NBA Summer League with the Atlanta Hawks. He then signed with the New York Knicks, but was waived at the end of the preseason.

He played college basketball for the Northwestern Wildcats. He has been a three-time All-Big Ten Conference selection (2010–2nd team; 2011–3rd team coaches/honorable mention media; 2012–1st team) and the Northwestern statistical leader in several categories. He was the 2010 Sporting News Most Improved Player. He formerly held the Northwestern career and single-season scoring records. He was selected as an honorable mention Associated Press 2012 NCAA Men's Basketball All-American. He won the State Farm College 3-Point Championship three-point shooting contest at the 2012 Final Four.

In high school, he was the 2008 Illinois High School Association (IHSA) Class 4A Slam Dunk Champion. He was a member of the gold medal-winning USA Basketball team at the 2009 FIBA Under-19 World Championship.

== High school career ==
Shurna was a 2007 and 2008 Chicago Tribune All-State boys basketball team special mention selection. As a junior, in March 2007, he led Glenbard West High School to the Class AA supersectional for the first time since 1938, but they lost to Lockport Township High School 53–50 despite 27 points by Shurna, according to the Chicago Sun-Times, but only 21 according to the Daily Southtown and Chicago Tribune. He committed to Northwestern University on May 13, 2007, but he did not sign his National Letter of Intent until November 14.

As a senior, he was selected to the IHSA 4A all-state second-team by Associated Press and the 3A/4A all-state first-team by Illinois Basketball Coaches Association. In addition, he won the 2008 IHSA 4A slam dunk championship at the state tournament, but finished second to Marland Johnson by a point in a contest of the winners of the four classes. As a senior, he finished 8th in the Illinois Mr. Basketball voting. Following his senior season, he participated in local and regional All-Star contests such as the 34th annual Foundation For Student Athletes city-suburban all-star event. Although ESPN.com ranked Shurna as the 53rd best high school basketball power forward in the national class of 2008, he was not among the ranked players by state or position according to either Rivals.com or Scout.com.

College recruiting
Name	Hometown	School	Height	Weight	Commit date
John Shurna; PF	Glen Ellyn, Illinois	Glenbard West (IL)	6 ft 8 in (2.03 m)	195 lb (88 kg)	May 13, 2007
John Shurna; PF	Recruit ratings: Rivals: (82)				
Overall recruit ranking: ESPN: 53 (PF)
Note: In many cases, Scout, Rivals, 247Sports, On3, and ESPN may conflict in their listings of height and weight.; In these cases, the average was taken. ESPN grades are on a 100-point scale.; Sources: "Northwestern Basketball Commitments". Rivals.; "2008 Northwestern Basketball Commits". Scout.; "ESPN". ESPN.; "Scout.com Team Recruiting Rankings". Scout.; "2008 Team Ranking". Rivals.

== College career ==
=== Freshman ===
As a true freshman, he started all 31 games for the 2008–09 Northwestern Wildcats. Shurna was a member of Team USA basketball during the 2009 FIBA Under-19 World Championship competition held in Auckland, New Zealand from July 2, 2009, until July 12. He played in all 9 games, starting 2. Despite averaging the fewest minutes (12.2), he was fifth on the team in rebounding with (3.9). The USA team earned the gold medal.

=== Sophomore ===
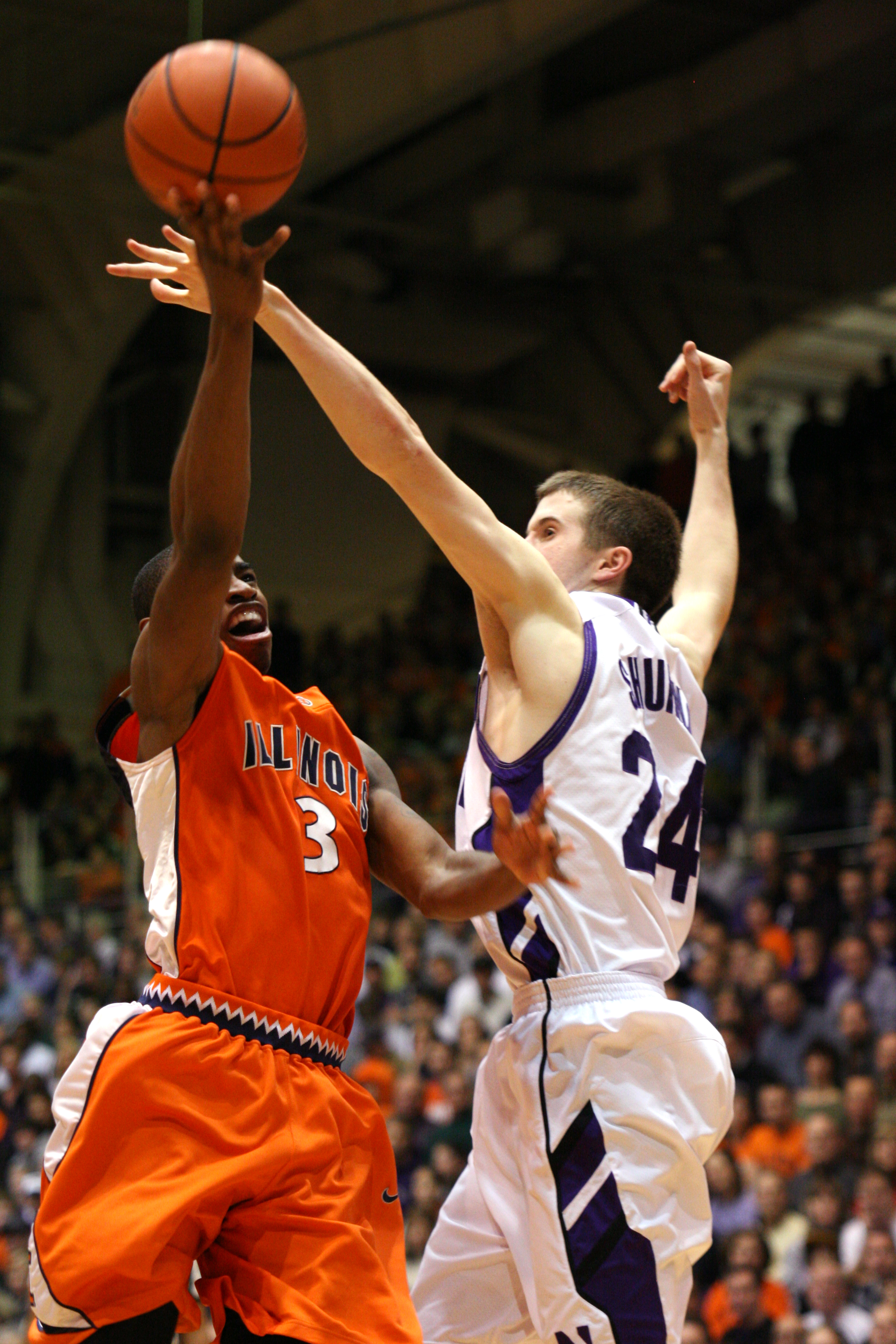
Shurna defends against Brandon Paul of Illinois (1–23–2010)

He played forward for the 2009–10 Northwestern Wildcats and led the team in scoring and rebounding. Following the 2009–10 All-Big Ten Conference regular season, he was named a second-team All-conference selection by both the coaches and the media. He was twice named Big Ten men's basketball player of the week during the season. He was recognized as an All-District second-team selection by the National Association of Basketball Coaches making him eligible for the State Farm Division I All‐America teams. He finished his sophomore season among the Big Ten leaders in many statistical categories: 3rd in scoring, 7th in rebounding, 10th in free throw percentage, 8th in blocked shots, and 6th in minutes played. He was recognized by Sporting News as the Most Improved Player after raising his scoring average from 7.3 points as a freshman to 18.5 as a sophomore, while improving his rebounding average from 2.6 to 6.4. During the season, he established new Northwestern Wildcats basketball single-season records in both total points (619), surpassing Evan Eschmeyer, and field goals made (217), surpassing Dale Kelly. In so doing, he helped Northwestern establish a new school record for single-season wins with 20.

=== Junior ===
As a junior, he was a preseason top 50 candidate for both the John R. Wooden Award and the Naismith College Player of the Year. In the first game of his junior season, Shurna tied his career-high with 31 points on his way to Big Ten Player of the Week honors. On December 20, in week 6 of the season, Shurna repeated as conference player of the week. Following the 2010–11 Big Ten Conference men's basketball season, he was a third team All-Big Ten selection by the coaches and an honorable mention by the media. Sports Illustrated named him as one of the ten best players in the Big Ten Conference.

Shurna submitted the paperwork to declare for the 2011 NBA draft following the season, though he did not hire an agent. He withdrew his name prior to the May 8 deadline and chose to return for his senior year. He was one of 20 players who tried out to represent USA Basketball at the 2011 Summer Universiade, but did not make the team.

=== Senior ===
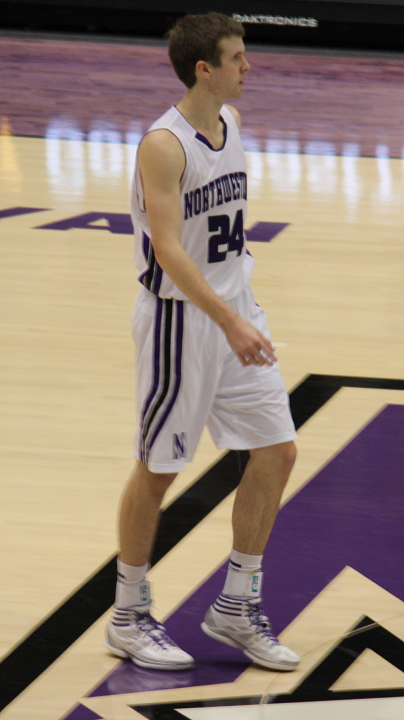
Shurna in 2012

As a senior, he repeated as a preseason top 50 watchlist selection for the Wooden Award and the Naismith Award. He was also a Sporting News Preseason All-American (2nd team). When Shurna scored 37 points on November 17 against LSU it heralded a career-high and tied for the most points scored by a Northwestern player during the 12-year Bill Carmody era. On December 18, he scored 32 points as Northwestern defeated Eastern Illinois. Shurna earned Co-Big Ten Player of the week on February 6 after averaging 26 points, 4 rebounds and 2 steals in wins over Nebraska and Illinois on February 2 and 5, respectively. On February 12, he posted his third 30-point game of the season against Purdue. With three 30-point games as a senior, he brought his career total to six. On February 18 he became Northwestern's all-time leading scorer in a game against Minnesota, passing Billy McKinney's record of 1,900 points (a record since surpassed by Boo Buie in 2024). He was selected as a first team All-Big Ten selection by both the coaches and the media. He was selected by the U.S. Basketball Writers Association to its 10-man 2011–12 Men's All-District V (OH, IN, IL, MI, MN, WI) Team. Shurna was a first team selection to the National Association of Basketball Coaches Division I All‐District 7 team on March 14. Shurna finished the season with a 20.0 point per game average, which led the Big Ten Conference. He was named an honorable mention Associated Press All-American. He competed in the 2012 State Farm 3-Point Contest, beating Juan Fernandez 21–20 in the final round by making his final seven shots. Shurna was also selected to participate in the NABC 2012 Reese's Division I All-Star Game at the 2012 NCAA Men's Division I Basketball Tournament final four. Shurna had 12 points in the game. Shurna's single-season scoring records were surpassed by Nick Martinelli in 2025.

== Professional career ==
After going undrafted in the 2012 NBA draft, Shurna signed a 2012 Las Vegas NBA Summer League contract with the Atlanta Hawks. On September 10, 2012, Shurna signed a 1-year partially guaranteed contract with the New York Knicks. He was waived at the end of the preseason. By the beginning of December 2012, he had made his professional debut with Strasbourg IG of LNB Pro A. Shurna was originally signed as an injury replacement for Nicolas de Jong until the end of 2012, but was signed longer term as it became apparent that de Jong would be out for an extended period.

After he played on the Milwaukee Bucks' 2013 NBA Summer League team, Shurna signed a 2-year contract with Joventut Badalona. He signed with the Toronto Raptors for the 2014 NBA Summer League and posted 21 points on 6-for-9 field goal shooting including 5 three point shots in his July 11 debut. In August 2014, he signed a one-year contract with Turkish Basketball League team Darüşşafaka. He played in the 2015 NBA Summer League with the Cleveland Cavaliers. On July 27, 2015, he signed a one-year contract with Valencia Basket of Spain. On November 13, 2016, Shurna signed with Croatian club Cedevita Zagreb for the rest of the season.

On July 27, 2017, Shurna signed a one-year deal with MoraBanc Andorra of the Liga ACB. On August 18, 2018, Shurna re-signed a one-year deal with MoraBanc Andorra of the Liga ACB. On July 27, 2019, he signed with Herbalife Gran Canaria. Shurna was re-signed to a two-year contract with the team on June 11, 2021. On June 28, 2023, he signed a two-year contract extension.

On July 24, 2025, Shurna was signed to a two-year contract with Força Lleida of Liga ACB.

== Personal life ==
Shurna was born in Glen Ellyn, Illinois, to Tony and Suzy Shurna. At Northwestern, he was a double major in sociology and learning and organizational change. On July 11, 2014, Shurna acquired Lithuanian citizenship per Lithuanian nationality law.
