= Melsahn Basabe =

American basketball player

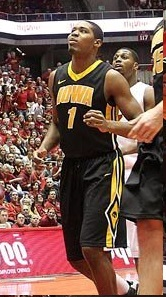
- Basabe with Iowa in 2011

Free agent
- Position: Power forward

Personal information
- Born: May 29, 1992 (age 34) Winston-Salem, North Carolina
- Listed height: 6 ft 8 in (2.03 m)
- Listed weight: 220 lb (100 kg)

Career information
- High school: St. Mark's School (Southborough, Massachusetts)
- College: Iowa (2010–2014)
- NBA draft: 2014: undrafted
- Playing career: 2014–present

Career history
- 2014–2015: Helsinki Seagulls
- 2015–2016: Antwerp Giants
- 2016–2017: Doxa Lefkadas
- 2017: Lukoil Academic
- 2017: AZS Koszalin
- 2017–2018: Cuore Napoli
- 2018: Helsinki Seagulls
- 2018–2019: Hapoel Kfar Saba
- 2019–2020: Lučenec
- 2020: Slávia Žilina
- 2020–2021: Indios de Mayagüez
- 2021–2022: Real Estelí
- 2022–2023: Mets de Guaynabo
- 2023–2024: Piratas de Quebradillas
- 2024–2025: Santeros de Aguada

Career highlights
- LSB champion (2021); Bulgarian League champion (2017); Big Ten All-Freshman team (2011)

Melsahn Basabe (born May 29, 1992) is a Puerto Rican professional basketball player, who most recently played for the Santeros de Aguada of the Baloncesto Superior Nacional (BSN). He played college basketball at the University of Iowa.

== Personal life ==
Basabe was born in Winston-Salem, North Carolina to father Carlos Basabe and mother Aloha Wilks. Although born in North Carolina, Basabe attended St. Mark's School in Southborough, Massachusetts.

=== High school career ===
Basabe's high school coach was David Lubick. During the summer of 2009, Basabe was a member of the highly regarded New York Gauchos. He averaged 13 points and nine rebounds the following year playing for the NEPSAC Class C runner-up Lions, including an impressive showing in his team's first 2010 playoff game, in which he scored 30 points. He was a team captain, and he received all-league honors as a senior.

== College career ==
Rivals.com rated Basabe as a 3-star power forward. He was set to play for current Iowa coach Fran McCaffery when McCaffery was still coaching Siena. When Iowa fired then coach Todd Lickliter after three years of mediocrity, Basabe decided to follow McCaffery to Iowa. Boston College and St. John's were thought to be interested in Basabe as well. He finished the year averaging 11 points second on the team, 6.8 rebounds first on the team, and 1.3 blocks per game also first on the team. Basabe had a career high 22 points against then #2 Ohio State on January 4, 2011. Basabe also added 13 rebounds and 6 blocks, despite being covered by Jared Sullinger for most of the game.

Basabe led Iowa in rebounding and blocks as a freshman. He is the first Hawkeye, regardless of class, to collect 325 points, 200 rebounds, and 40 blocks in a single season since Ryan Bowen in 1998.

Basabe and teammate Bryce Cartwright were awarded honorable mention all-Big Ten recognition. Basabe was named to the Big Ten's all-freshman team, which is selected by coaches.

== Professional career ==
Basabe signed his first pro contract with the Helsinki Seagulls of the Korisliiga. He played 42 games, averaging 31:52 minutes, 19.4 points and 12 rebounds per game. For the 2015–2016 season, he signed with Antwerp Giants of the Belgian League.

On September 30, 2016, Basabe signed with Doxa Lefkadas of the Greek Basket League.

On September 15, 2017, Basabe signed with AZS Koszalin of the Polish Basketball League.

On February 5, 2018, Basabe signed with the Helsinki Seagulls of the Finnish Korisliiga, beginning his second stint with the squad.

On August 5, 2018, Basabe signed a one-year deal with the Israeli team Hapoel Kfar Saba of the Liga Leumit. In 11 games played for Kfar Saba, Basabe averaged 14.5 points and 10.4 rebounds per game, shooting 61.6 percent from the field. However, on January 15, 2019, Basabe parted ways with Kfar Saba.

On September 10, 2019, he has signed with BKM Lučenec of the Slovak Basketball League. Basabe finished the season with Slávia Žilina of the Slovak league, averaging 13.8 points, 10.2 rebounds and 1.8 assists per game.

On September 30, 2020, he signed with Indios de Mayagüez of the Baloncesto Superior Nacional.
