= Naismith Award =

Naismith Award is a basketball award named after James Naismith, and awarded by the Atlanta Tipoff Club.

Naismith Awards include:

- Naismith College Player of the Year (men's and women's; NCAA Division I basketball)
- Naismith College Coach of the Year (men's and women's; NCAA Division I basketball)
- Naismith Defensive Player of the Year (men's and women's; NCAA Division I basketball)
- Naismith Prep Player of the Year (male and female)
- Naismith College Official of the Year (men's and women's)
- Naismith Legacy Award, "presented to players, coaches and other individuals or organizations from the game of basketball honoring their role in furthering the values of honor, respect and integrity -- both on an [sic] off the court."

Another "Naismith Award", defunct since 2013, was not administered by the Atlanta Tipoff Club, and was named after John Naismith's daughter-in-law Frances Pomeroy Naismith:

- Frances Pomeroy Naismith Award — NCAA Division I basketball; men's award, handed out by the National Association of Basketball Coaches, was restricted to players no taller than 6 ft/1.83 m, and women's award, handed out by the Women's Basketball Coaches Association, was restricted to players no taller than 5 ft 8 in/1.73 m
