= Senior CLASS Award =

US college athletics award

The Senior CLASS Award is awarded to the most outstanding senior student-athlete in 10 NCAA Division I sports. An acronym for "Celebrating Loyalty and Achievement for Staying in School," the Senior CLASS Award focuses on the total student-athlete and encourages them to use their platform in athletics to make a positive impact as leaders in their communities. The awards were sponsored by Lowe's until 2012 and were popularly known as the Lowe's Senior CLASS Awards during this time.

== History ==
The award was born in 2001 when sportscaster Dick Enberg suggested a national award for senior basketball players during the CBS telecast of the NCAA Final Four championship game. In that game, Shane Battier led Duke to the NCAA Division I Men's Basketball title. Battier's decision to turn down the NBA and return for his senior season was one of the media stories of the year in college basketball. Soon after, Premier Sports Management, in partnership with Lowe's, announced the formation of the Senior CLASS Award. Enberg agreed to serve as honorary chair of the award and CBS Sports provided broadcast support, announcing the winner each year during the Final Four telecast. The scope of the award program was expanded the following year with the addition of a women's basketball award, and still further in 2007 with the addition of six NCAA Division I sports: men's and women's soccer, men's lacrosse, men's ice hockey, softball, and baseball. The Football Bowl Subdivision was added in 2008 and women's volleyball in 2010. The current spokesperson is CBS Sports's Emmy Award-winning sports broadcaster Jim Nantz.

In 2021, Premier Sports Management announced a modification to the nomination process with respect to the 2020–21 school year. Due to COVID-19 disruptions, the NCAA ruled that the 2020–21 school year would not be counted against the eligibility of players in fall and winter sports. As a result, many student-athletes were likely to return for a de facto second senior season in 2021–22. The policy for these individuals is:

- All individuals who would have exhausted their athletic eligibility at the end of the 2020–21 school year were eligible for nomination as seniors in that year.
- Among individuals who returned for a second senior season in 2021–22, only those chosen as finalists for a 2020–21 award are ineligible for a 2021–22 award.

== Selection process ==
Selection of candidates from the many nominations is based on four criteria that exemplify a "complete" student-athlete: community, classroom, character, and competition.

== Award winners ==
For the current academic year's winner, First Team members, Second Team members, and previous years' recipients (in each sport), see footnote
