= 2007–08 Florida State Seminoles men's basketball team =

American college basketball season

2007–08 Florida State Seminoles men's basketball

NIT, 1st round
- Conference: Atlantic Coast Conference
- Record: 19-15 (7-9 ACC)
- Head coach: Leonard Hamilton
- Home arena: Donald L. Tucker Civic Center

2007–08 ACC men's basketball standings
	Conf.				Overall
Team	W		L	PCT	W		L	PCT
No. 1 North Carolina †	14	–	2	.875	36	–	3	.923
No. 9 Duke	13	–	3	.813	28	–	6	.824
No. 22 Clemson	10	–	6	.625	24	–	10	.706
Virginia Tech	9	–	7	.563	21	–	14	.600
Miami (FL)	8	–	8	.500	23	–	11	.676
Maryland	8	–	8	.500	19	–	15	.559
Georgia Tech	7	–	9	.438	15	–	17	.469
Wake Forest	7	–	9	.438	17	–	13	.567
Florida State	7	–	9	.438	19	–	15	.559
Virginia	5	–	11	.313	17	–	16	.515
Boston College	4	–	12	.250	14	–	17	.452
NC State	4	–	12	.250	15	–	16	.484
† 2008 ACC tournament winner Rankings from AP Poll

The 2007–08 Florida State Seminoles men's basketball team represented Florida State University in the 2007–08 NCAA Division I men's basketball season. The team was coached by Leonard Hamilton.

The Seminoles finished the season with a 19–15 record. They were eliminated from the ACC tournament in a 2nd round loss to North Carolina 82–70. In the 2008 NIT, the Seminoles lost in the first round to Akron 65–60 in overtime, ending their season.
