= 2007–08 Atlantic Coast Conference men's basketball season =

2007–08 Atlantic Coast Conference Men's Basketball Season
- League: NCAA Division I
- Sport: Basketball
- Teams: 12
- TV partner(s): Raycom, ESPN

Regular Season
- First place: North Carolina (14–2)
- Runners-up: Duke (13–3)
- Season MVP: Tyler Hansbrough – UNC

Tournament
- Champions: North Carolina (17th)
- Runners-up: Clemson
- Finals MVP: Tyler Hansbrough

Basketball seasons
- ← 2006–07 2008–09 →

2007–08 ACC men's basketball standings
	Conf.				Overall
Team	W		L	PCT	W		L	PCT
No. 1 North Carolina †	14	–	2	.875	36	–	3	.923
No. 9 Duke	13	–	3	.813	28	–	6	.824
No. 22 Clemson	10	–	6	.625	24	–	10	.706
Virginia Tech	9	–	7	.563	21	–	14	.600
Miami (FL)	8	–	8	.500	23	–	11	.676
Maryland	8	–	8	.500	19	–	15	.559
Georgia Tech	7	–	9	.438	15	–	17	.469
Wake Forest	7	–	9	.438	17	–	13	.567
Florida State	7	–	9	.438	19	–	15	.559
Virginia	5	–	11	.313	17	–	16	.515
Boston College	4	–	12	.250	14	–	17	.452
NC State	4	–	12	.250	15	–	16	.484
† 2008 ACC tournament winner Rankings from AP Poll

The 2007–08 Atlantic Coast Conference men's basketball season was the 55th season for the league. The North Carolina Tar Heels won both the regular-season and conference titles. The ACC sent four teams to the NCAA tournament: North Carolina, Duke, Clemson and Miami.

== Final standings ==
Team	ACC Regular Season	ACC %	ACC Home	ACC Road	All Games	All Games %	All Home	All Road	All Neutral
North Carolina	14–2	.875	6–2	8–0	35–2	.946	14–2	13–0	9–1
Duke	13–3	.813	7–1	6–2	28–6	.824	15–1	8–2	5–3
Clemson	10–6	.625	7–1	3–5	24–10	.706	14–2	6–5	4–3
Virginia Tech	9–7	.563	6–2	3–5	21–14	.600	14–3	4–8	3–3
Miami	8–8	.500	6–2	2–6	23–11	.676	14–2	4–6	5–3
Maryland	8–8	.500	4–4	4–4	19–15	.559	13–6	6–5	0–4
Georgia Tech	7–9	.438	3–5	4–4	15–17	.469	6–7	6–8	3–2
Wake Forest	7–9	.438	6–2	1–7	17–13	.567	15–2	2–10	0–1
Florida State	7–9	.438	4–4	3–5	19–15	.559	13–5	4–7	2–3
Virginia	5–11	.313	3–5	2–6	17–16	.515	13–7	4–7	0–2
Boston College	4–12	.250	3–5	1–7	14–17	.452	11–8	2–7	1–2
North Carolina State	4–12	.250	3–5	1–7	15–16	.484	10–6	2–9	3–0

== Statistical leaders ==
Points per game			Rebounds per game			Assists per game			Steals per game		
Player	School	PPG	Player	School	RPG	Player	School	APG	Player	School	SPG
Tyler Hansbrough	UNC	22.6	Tyler Hansbrough	UNC	10.2	Greivis Vásquez	MD	6.8	Toney Douglas	FSU	2.7
Tyrese Rice	BC	21.0	J. J. Hickson	NCSU	8.5	Sean Singletary	UVA	6.1	Jeff Allen	VT	2.1
Sean Singletary	UVA	19.8	James Johnson	WF	8.1	Ty Lawson	UNC	5.2	Cliff Hammonds	Clem.	1.9
Jack McClinton	Mia.	17.7	James Gist	MD	7.9	Tyrese Rice	BC	5.0	K. C. Rivers	Clem.	1.9
Greivis Vásquez	MD	17.0	Jeff Allen	VT	7.6	Ishmael Smith	WF	4.7	Jeff Teague	WF	1.8

Blocked shots per game			Field goal percentage			Three-point FG percentage			Free throw percentage		
Player	School	BPG	Player	School	FG%	Player	School	3FG%	Player	School	FT%
Tyrelle Blair	BC	3.4	J. J. Hickson	NCSU	59.1	Anthony Morrow	GT	44.8	Jack McClinton	Mia.	91.9
James Gist	MD	2.3	Tyler Hansbrough	UNC	54.0	Jack McClinton	Mia.	42.7	Jon Scheyer	Duke	88.9
Bambale Osby	MD	2.1	James Gist	MD	49.6	Terrence Oglesby	Clem.	40.3	Lance Hurdle	Mia.	86.5
Trevor Booker	Clem.	1.9	DeMarcus Nelson	Duke	49.0				Sean Singletary	UVA	85.1
Chas McFarland	WF	1.6	James Johnson	WF	48.7				Tyrese Rice	BC	84.6

== Players of the week ==
Throughout the conference season, the ACC offices name a player and rookie of the week. North Carolina's Tyler Hansbrough broke the ACC single-season record for player of the week honors during the 2007–08 season with eight awards. The record had previously been seven, held by JJ Redick and Antawn Jamison. The MVP of the ACC tournament is the automatic winner of the final ACC player of the week of each season.

Week	Player of the week	Rookie of the week
11/12/07	Anthony Morrow, GT	Jeff Allen, VT
11/19/07	Sean Singletary, UVA	J. J. Hickson, NCSU
11/26/07	Tyler Hansbrough, UNC	Kyle Singler, Duke
12/3/07	K. C. Rivers, Clem.	Kyle Singler, Duke
12/3/07	Wayne Ellington, UNC	Kyle Singler, Duke
12/10/07	Tyler Hansbrough, UNC	Corey Raji, BC
12/17/07	Jack McClinton, Mia.	Jeff Teague, WF
12/24/07	Tyler Hansbrough, UNC	Terrence Oglesby, Clem.
12/31/07	Tyler Hansbrough, UNC	J. J. Hickson, NCSU
12/31/07	Toney Douglas, FSU	J. J. Hickson, NCSU
1/7/08	Wayne Ellington, UNC	Kyle Singler, Duke
1/14/08	Trevor Booker, Clem.	Jeff Allen, VT
1/21/08	James Gist, MD	James Johnson, WF
1/28/08	Matt Causey, GT	J. J. Hickson, NCSU
1/28/08	DeMarcus Nelson, Duke	J. J. Hickson, NCSU
2/4/08	Tyler Hansbrough, UNC	Jeff Teague, WF
2/11/08	Tyler Hansbrough, UNC	Kyle Singler, Duke
2/18/08	Greivis Vásquez, MD	Jeff Teague, WF
2/18/08	Tyrese Rice, BC	Jeff Teague, WF
2/25/08	Tyler Hansbrough, UNC	Maurice Miller, GT
3/3/08	Tyrese Rice, BC	Terrence Oglesby, Clem.
3/10/08	Sean Singletary, UVA	Jeff Teague, WF
3/17/08	Tyler Hansbrough, UNC	None Selected

== Conference honors ==
ACC Conference awards were handed out at the conclusion of the regular season. Tyler Hansbrough was the unanimous choice for ACC player of the year, while Virginia Tech's Seth Greenberg won conference Coach of the Year honors for guiding the Hokies to a fourth-place finish after being picked tenth in the preseason. Duke swept the remaining individual honors as Kyle Singler and DeMarcus Nelson won Rookie of the Year and Defensive Player of the Year respectively.

=== Player of the year ===
Tyler Hansbrough, North Carolina

=== Rookie of the year ===
Kyle Singler, Duke

=== Coach of the year ===
Seth Greenberg, Virginia Tech

=== Defensive player of the year ===
DeMarcus Nelson, Duke

=== All-Atlantic Coast Conference ===
First Team

- Tyler Hansbrough, Jr., North Carolina
- Tyrese Rice, Jr., Boston College
- Sean Singletary, Sr., Virginia
- DeMarcus Nelson, Sr., Duke
- Jack McClinton, Jr., Miami

Second Team

- Greivis Vásquez, So., Maryland
- James Gist, Sr., Maryland
- Wayne Ellington, So., North Carolina
- A. D. Vassallo, Jr., Virginia Tech
- K. C. Rivers, Jr., Clemson

Third Team

- Kyle Singler, Fr., Duke
- Cliff Hammonds, Sr., Clemson
- Toney Douglas, Jr., Florida State
- James Johnson, Fr., Wake Forest
- Greg Paulus, Jr., Duke

Honorable Mention: Ty Lawson, So., UNC; J. J. Hickson, Fr., NCSU; Deron Washington, Sr., VT; Anthony Morrow, Sr., GT

=== All-ACC freshman team ===
- Kyle Singler, Duke
- James Johnson, Wake Forest
- J. J. Hickson, NC State
- Jeff Allen, Virginia Tech
- Jeff Teague, Wake Forest

Honorable Mention: Terrence Oglesby, Clemson

=== All-ACC Defensive team ===
- DeMarcus Nelson, Sr., Duke
- Toney Douglas, Jr., Florida State
- Tyrelle Blair, Sr., Boston College
- Marcus Ginyard, Jr., North Carolina
- James Gist, Sr., Maryland

Honorable Mention: Cliff Hammonds, Sr., Clemson; D'Andre Bell, Jr., GT; Tyler Hansbrough, Jr., UNC; Jeff Allen, Fr., VT; Deron Washington, Sr., VT; James Mays, Sr., Clemson

== ACC tournament ==
See 2008 ACC men's basketball tournament

== Postseason ==
=== NCAA tournament ===
ACC Record: 6–4

1 North Carolina (4–1) – Final Four

W 16 Mount St. Mary's 113–76
W 9 Arkansas 108–77
W 4 Washington State 68–47
W 3 Louisville 83–73
L 1 Kansas 66–84

2 Duke (1–1)

W 15 Belmont 71–70
L 7 West Virginia 67–73

5 Clemson (0–1)

L 12 Villanova 69–75

7 Miami (1–1)

W 10 St, Mary's 78–64
L 2 Texas 72–75

=== NIT ===
ACC Record: 3–3

1 Virginia Tech (2–1)

W 8 Morgan State 94–62
W 5 Alabama-Birmingham 75–49
L 2 Ole Miss 72–81

3 Florida State (0–1)

L 6 Akron 60–63 (OT)

5 Maryland (1–1)

W 4 Minnesota 68–58
L 1 Syracuse 72–88

=== CBI ===
ACC Record: 2–1

1 Virginia (2–1)

W 4 Richmond 66–64
W 2 Old Dominion 80–76
L 1 Bradley 85–96
