= 2007–08 Maryland Terrapins men's basketball team =

American college basketball season

2007–08 Maryland Terrapins men's basketball
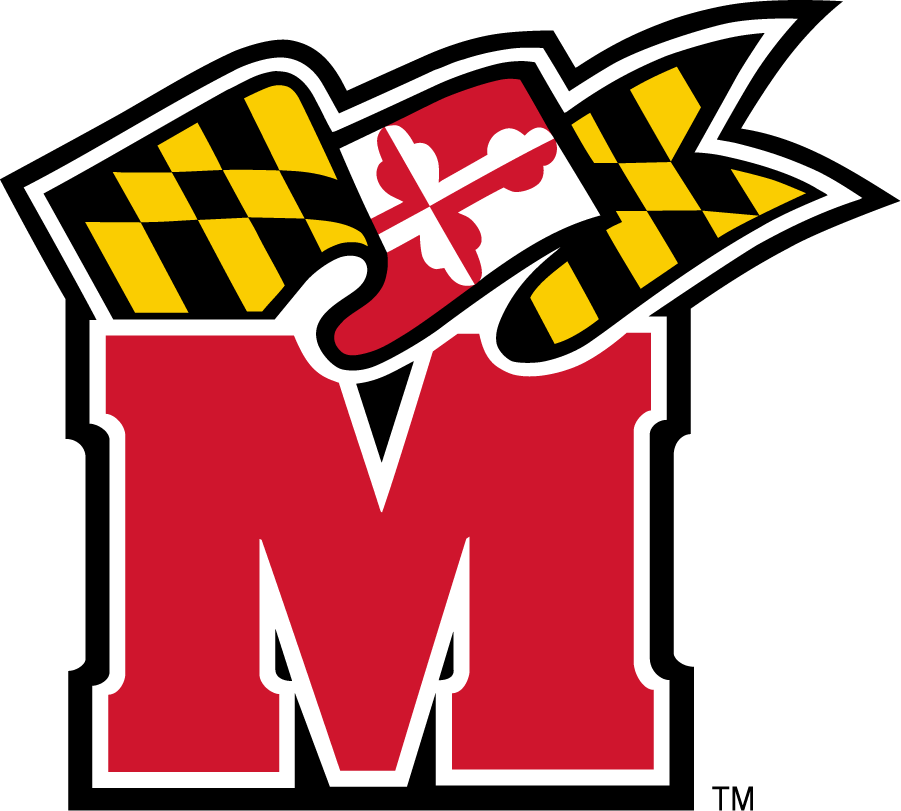
- Conference: Atlantic Coast Conference
- Record: 19–15 (8–8 ACC)
- Head coach: Gary Williams
- Home arena: Comcast Center

2007–08 ACC men's basketball standings
	Conf.				Overall
Team	W		L	PCT	W		L	PCT
No. 1 North Carolina †	14	–	2	.875	36	–	3	.923
No. 9 Duke	13	–	3	.813	28	–	6	.824
No. 22 Clemson	10	–	6	.625	24	–	10	.706
Virginia Tech	9	–	7	.563	21	–	14	.600
Miami (FL)	8	–	8	.500	23	–	11	.676
Maryland	8	–	8	.500	19	–	15	.559
Georgia Tech	7	–	9	.438	15	–	17	.469
Wake Forest	7	–	9	.438	17	–	13	.567
Florida State	7	–	9	.438	19	–	15	.559
Virginia	5	–	11	.313	17	–	16	.515
Boston College	4	–	12	.250	14	–	17	.452
NC State	4	–	12	.250	15	–	16	.484
† 2008 ACC tournament winner Rankings from AP Poll

The 2007–08 Maryland Terrapins men's basketball team represented the University of Maryland in the 2007–08 college basketball season as a member of the Atlantic Coast Conference (ACC). The team was led by 19th-year head coach Gary Williams. Maryland finished with a 19–15 record, and did not qualify for the NCAA tournament. The Terrapins were eliminated in the second round of the National Invitation Tournament by Syracuse.

== Roster ==
Note: Flags indicate national team eligibility at FIBA sanctioned events. Players may hold other non-FIBA nationality not displayed.

No.		Position	Player
1	(United States)	F	Landon Milbourne
2	(England)	F	Shane Walker
4	(United States)	C	Braxton Dupree
5	(United States)	G	Eric Hayes
10	(United States)	G	Jason McAlpin
15	(United States)	F	James Gist
21	(Venezuela)	G	Greivis Vásquez

No.		Position	Player
22	(United States)	G	Adrian Bowie
23	(United States)	G	David Pearman
24	(United States)	G	Cliff Tucker
32	(United States)	F	Jerome Burney
33	(United States)	F	Dino Gregory
35	(United States)	F	Dave Neal
50	(United States)	F	Bambale Osby

== Schedule and results ==
Date time, TV	Rank^{#}	Opponent^{#}	Result	Record	Site (attendance) city, state
CBE Classic
November 11, 2007*; 8:00 pm, ESPNU		North Florida	W 79–50	1–0	Comcast Center (17,950); College Park, MD
November 12, 2007*; 9:00 pm		Hampton	W 70–64	2–0	Comcast Center (17,950); College Park, MD
November 15, 2007*; 8:00 pm, ESPNU		Northeastern	W 74–72 ^{OT}	3–0	Comcast Center (17,950); College Park, MD
November 19, 2007*; 6:00 pm, ESPN2		vs. No. 1 UCLA; College Basketball Experience Classic	L 59–71	3–1	Sprint Center (18,022); Kansas City, MO
November 20, 2007*; 6:30 pm, ESPNU		vs. Missouri; College Basketball Experience Classic	L 70–84	3–2	Sprint Center (16,737); Kansas City, MO
Regular season
November 23, 2007*; 4:00 pm, CSN		Lehigh	W 72–51	4–2	Comcast Center (17,950); College Park, MD
November 28, 2007*; 7:30 pm, ESPN2		Illinois	W 69–61	5–2	Comcast Center (17,950); College Park, MD
December 2, 2007*; 7:30 pm, MASN		vs. VCU; BB&T Classic	L 76–85	5–3	Verizon Center (12,085); Washington, D.C.
December 6, 2007*; 8:00 pm, CSN		Morgan State	W 89–65	6–3	Comcast Center (17,950); College Park, MD
December 9, 2007; 7:30 pm, FSN		Boston College	L 78–81	6–4 (0–1)	Comcast Center (17,950); College Park, MD
December 12, 2007*; 8:00 pm, CSN		Ohio	L 55–61	6–5 (0–1)	Comcast Center (17,950); College Park, MD
December 22, 2007*; 4:00 pm, CSN		American	L 59–67	6–6 (0–1)	Comcast Center (17,950); College Park, MD
December 28, 2007*; 6:00 pm, CSN		Delaware	W 76–46	7–6 (0–1)	Comcast Center (17,950); College Park, MD
January 2, 2008*; 8:00 pm		Savannah State	W 75–48	8–6 (0–1)	Comcast Center (17,950); College Park, MD
January 5, 2008*; 12:00 pm, ESPNU		at Charlotte	W 76–72	9–6 (0–1)	Charlotte Bobcats Arena (9,841); Charlotte, NC
January 8, 2008*; 8:00 pm, CSN		Holy Cross	W 73–48	10–6 (0–1)	Comcast Center (17,950); College Park, MD
January 12, 2008; 2:00 pm, Raycom/LFS		at Virginia Tech	L 66–67	10–7 (0–2)	Cassell Coliseum (9,847); Blacksburg, VA
January 15, 2008; 9:00 pm, Raycom/LFS		Wake Forest	W 71–64	11–7 (1–2)	Comcast Center (17,950); College Park, MD
January 19, 2008; 3:30 pm, ABC		at No. 1 North Carolina	W 82–80	12–7 (2–2)	Dean Smith Center (21,033); Chapel Hill, NC
January 27, 2008; 6:30 pm, FSN		No. 4 Duke	L 84–93	12–8 (2–3)	Comcast Center (17,950); College Park, MD
January 30, 2008; 7:00 pm, ESPN		Virginia	W 85–75	13–8 (3–3)	Comcast Center (17,950); College Park, MD
February 2, 2008; 12:00 pm, ESPN		at Georgia Tech	W 88–86	14–8 (4–3)	Alexander Memorial Coliseum (9,191); Atlanta, GA
February 6, 2008; 7:00 pm, ESPNU		at Boston College	W 70–65	15–8 (5–3)	Conte Forum (6,449); Chestnut Hill, MA
February 9, 2008; 8:00 pm, Raycom/LFS		North Carolina State	W 84–70	16–8 (6–3)	Comcast Center (17,950); College Park, MD
February 13, 2008; 7:00 pm, ESPN		at No. 2 Duke	L 65–77	16–9 (6–4)	Cameron Indoor Stadium (9,314); Durham, NC
February 16, 2008; 3:00 pm, Raycom/LFS		Florida State	W 82–72	17–9 (7–4)	Comcast Center (17,950); College Park, MD
February 20, 2008; 9:00 pm, Raycom/LFS		Virginia Tech	L 65–69	17–10 (7–5)	Comcast Center (17,950); College Park, MD
February 23, 2008; 2:00 pm, Raycom/LFS		at Miami (FL)	L 63–68	17–11 (7–6)	BankUnited Center (6,058); Coral Gables, FL
February 28, 2008; 8:00 pm, Raycom/LFS		at Wake Forest	W 74–70	18–11 (8–6)	Lawrence Joel Veterans Memorial Coliseum (13,686); Winston-Salem, NC
March 2, 2008; 7:30 pm, FSN		Clemson	L 70–73	18–12 (8–7)	Comcast Center (17,950); College Park, MD
March 9, 2008; 7:30 pm, FSN		at Virginia	L 76–91	18–13 (8–8)	John Paul Jones Arena (14,154); Charlottesville, VA
ACC tournament
March 13, 2008; 9:40 pm, Raycom/LFS		vs. Boston College; First Round	L 68–71	18–14 (8–8)	Charlotte Bobcats Arena (20,035); Charlotte, NC
National Invitation Tournament
March 18, 2008*; 9:30 pm, ESPN		at Minnesota; First Round	W 68–58	19–14 (8–8)	Williams Arena (3,882); Minneapolis, MN
March 20, 2008*; 7:05 pm, ESPNU		at Syracuse; Second Round	L 72–88	19–15 (8–8)	Carrier Dome (14,768); Syracuse, NY
*Non-conference game. ^{#}Rankings from Coaches' Poll. (#) Tournament seedings in parentheses.

== See also ==
- Maryland Terrapins men's basketball
