= 2007–08 Georgia Tech Yellow Jackets men's basketball team =

American college basketball season

2007–08 Georgia Tech Yellow Jackets men's basketball
- Conference: Atlantic Coast Conference
- Record: 15–17 (7–9 ACC)
- Head coach: Paul Hewitt (8th season)
- Assistant coaches: John O'Connor; Charlton Young; Peter Zaharis
- Home arena: Alexander Memorial Coliseum

2007–08 ACC men's basketball standings
	Conf.				Overall
Team	W		L	PCT	W		L	PCT
No. 1 North Carolina †	14	–	2	.875	36	–	3	.923
No. 9 Duke	13	–	3	.813	28	–	6	.824
No. 22 Clemson	10	–	6	.625	24	–	10	.706
Virginia Tech	9	–	7	.563	21	–	14	.600
Miami (FL)	8	–	8	.500	23	–	11	.676
Maryland	8	–	8	.500	19	–	15	.559
Georgia Tech	7	–	9	.438	15	–	17	.469
Wake Forest	7	–	9	.438	17	–	13	.567
Florida State	7	–	9	.438	19	–	15	.559
Virginia	5	–	11	.313	17	–	16	.515
Boston College	4	–	12	.250	14	–	17	.452
NC State	4	–	12	.250	15	–	16	.484
† 2008 ACC tournament winner Rankings from AP Poll

The 2007–08 Georgia Tech Yellow Jackets men's basketball team plays college basketball for the Georgia Tech Yellow Jackets in the National Collegiate Athletic Association. The head coach was Paul Hewitt who led the team to a 15–17 record overall (7–9 in the Atlantic Coast Conference).

== Roster ==
Information from 2007-08 roster, subject to change.

Name	Number	Position	Height	Weight	Year	Hometown
Lewis Clinch	0	G	6-3	195	Junior	Cordele, Georgia
Matt Causey	2	G	6-0	186	Redshirt Senior	Gainesville, Georgia
Maurice Miller	3	G	6-1	181	Freshman	Memphis, Tennessee
Ra'Sean Dickey	4	F-C	6-10	250	Senior	Clio, South Carolina
Lance Storrs	10	G	6-4	212	Freshman	Decatur, Georgia
Ty Anderson	14	G	6-4	197	Sophomore	Watkinsville, Georgia
Anthony Morrow	23	G	6-5	210	Senior	Charlotte, North Carolina
Gary Cage	24	G	6-0	188	Junior	Atlanta, Georgia
Gani Lawal	31	F	6-8	216	Freshman	Riverdale, Georgia
Jeremis Smith	32	F	6-8	236	Senior	Fort Worth, Texas
Brad Sheehan	34	F-C	6-11	220	RS Freshman	Latham, New York
Zach Peacock	35	F	6-8	235	Sophomore	Miami, Florida
Alade Aminu	41	F-C	6-10	225	Junior	Stone Mountain, Georgia

== Schedule ==
Date	Opponent	Location	Time (EST)	Result	Overall	Conf.	Preview	Recap
**Exhibition Games**
November 2, 2007	Carson-Newman	Alexander Memorial Coliseum • Atlanta, GA	7:00 PM	**W** 126-86				
**Regular Season**
November 9, 2007	UNC Greensboro	Alexander Memorial Coliseum • Atlanta, GA	6:00 PM	**L** 83-74	0-1	0-0		
November 11, 2007	@ Tennessee State	Gentry Center • Nashville, TN	6:00 PM	**W** 99-85	1-1	0-0		
November 16, 2007	vs. Charlotte^{1}	Sports and Fitness Center • Saint Thomas, USVI	3:00 PM	**W** 82-77	2-1	0-0		
November 18, 2007	vs. Winthrop^{1}	Sports and Fitness Center • Saint Thomas, USVI	8:00 PM	**L** 79-73	2-2	0-0		
November 19, 2007	vs. Notre Dame^{1}	Sports and Fitness Center • Saint Thomas, USVI	6:00 PM	**W** 70-69	3-2	0-0		
November 27, 2007	@ #15 Indiana^{2}	Assembly Hall • Bloomington, IN	7:00 PM	**L** 83-79	3-3	0-0		
December 1, 2007	@ Vanderbilt	Memorial Gymnasium • Nashville, TN	1:00 PM	**L** 79-92	3-4	0-0		
December 5, 2007	@ Georgia State	GSU Sports Arena • Atlanta, GA	9:00 PM	**W** 72-67	4-4	0-0		
December 18, 2007	#3 Kansas	Alexander Memorial Coliseum • Atlanta, GA	7:00 PM	**L** 66-71	4-5	0-0		
December 22, 2007	Centenary	Alexander Memorial Coliseum • Atlanta, GA	2:00 PM	**W** 86-41	5-5	0-0		
December 27, 2007	Tennessee Tech	Alexander Memorial Coliseum • Atlanta, GA	7:00 PM	**W** 83-63	6-5	0-0		
December 30, 2007	**Florida State**	Alexander Memorial Coliseum • Atlanta, GA	5:30 PM	**L** 66-64	6-6	0-1		
January 6, 2008	Presbyterian	Alexander Memorial Coliseum • Atlanta, GA	1:00 PM	**W** 77-64	7-6	0-1		
January 9, 2008	@ Georgia	Stegeman Coliseum • Athens, GA	7:30 PM	**L** 79-72	6-7	0-1		
January 12, 2008	@ #25 **Miami**	BankUnited Center • Coral Gables, FL	2:00 PM	**L** 78-68	7-8	0-2		
January 16, 2008	#1 **North Carolina**	Alexander Memorial Coliseum • Atlanta, GA	9:00 PM	**L** 83-82	7-9	0-3		
January 19, 2008	**Virginia Tech**	Alexander Memorial Coliseum • Atlanta, GA	1:00 PM	**W** 81-70	8-9	1-3		
January 23, 2008	**NC State**	RBC Center • Raleigh, NC	7:00 PM	**W** 77-74	9-9	2-3		
January 27, 2008	**Virginia**	John Paul Jones Arena • Charlottesville, VA	4:30 PM	**W** 92-82	10-9	3-3		
February 2, 2008	**Maryland**	Alexander Memorial Coliseum • Atlanta, GA	12:00 PM	**L** 88-86	10-10	3-4		
February 6, 2008	**Wake Forest**	Lawrence Joel Veterans Memorial Coliseum • Winston-Salem, NC	7:00 PM	**W** 89-83	11-10	4-4		
*Conference games in **bold**. ^{1}Paradise Jam tournament ^{2}ACC–Big Ten Challenge
