= 2007–08 Clemson Tigers men's basketball team =

American college basketball season

2007–08 Clemson Tigers men's basketball

NCAA tournament, first round
- Conference: Atlantic Coast Conference

Ranking
- AP: No. 22
- Record: 24–10 (10–6 ACC)
- Head coach: Oliver Purnell
- Assistant coaches: Ron Bradley; Shaka Smart; Frank Smith
- Home arena: Littlejohn Coliseum

2007–08 ACC men's basketball standings
	Conf.				Overall
Team	W		L	PCT	W		L	PCT
No. 1 North Carolina †	14	–	2	.875	36	–	3	.923
No. 9 Duke	13	–	3	.813	28	–	6	.824
No. 22 Clemson	10	–	6	.625	24	–	10	.706
Virginia Tech	9	–	7	.563	21	–	14	.600
Miami (FL)	8	–	8	.500	23	–	11	.676
Maryland	8	–	8	.500	19	–	15	.559
Georgia Tech	7	–	9	.438	15	–	17	.469
Wake Forest	7	–	9	.438	17	–	13	.567
Florida State	7	–	9	.438	19	–	15	.559
Virginia	5	–	11	.313	17	–	16	.515
Boston College	4	–	12	.250	14	–	17	.452
NC State	4	–	12	.250	15	–	16	.484
† 2008 ACC tournament winner Rankings from AP Poll

The 2007–08 Clemson Tigers men's basketball team represented Clemson University. The head coach is Oliver Purnell. The team played its home games in Littlejohn Coliseum in Clemson, South Carolina.

== Post-season ==
=== 2008 ACC tournament ===
The Tigers entered the tournament seeded third in the conference, their highest seeding since their 1989–90 team won the regular-season championship. After defeating Boston College in their first game, the Tigers advanced to the ACC Tournament Final for the first time in 46 years (1962) and only the second time in school history by knocking off the #7 Duke Blue Devils by a score of 78–74. In the finals, they were defeated by #1 North Carolina 86–81.

=== 2008 NCAA tournament ===
Clemson received the #5 seed in the Midwest region of the 2008 NCAA Tournament. It was the first time in 10 years that the Tigers made the field of 64. After building as much as an 18-point lead in the first half, the Tigers eventually fell to the #12 seed Wildcats by a final of 75–69. This marked the first time in NCAA Tournament history that 4 lower seeded teams (Villanova, Siena, Kansas State, Davidson) from one region (Midwest) all advanced to the second round.

== 2007–08 roster ==
No.	Name	Ht.	Wt.	Position	Year	Hometown
5	Zavier Anderson	5'9"	160	G	FR	Greenville, South Carolina
4	Jonah Baize	6'6"	200	G/F	FR	Evansville, Indiana
35	Trevor Booker	6'7"	240	C/F	SO	Whitmire, South Carolina
45	Jerai Grant	6'8"	215	F	FR	Bowie, Maryland
25	Cliff Hammonds	6'3"	200	G	SR	Cairo, Georgia
40	James Mays	6'9"	230	F	SR	Garner, North Carolina
24	Matt Morris	6'5"	200	F	SR	Georgetown, South Carolina
22	Terrence Oglesby	6'2"	185	G	FR	Cleveland, Tennessee
32	Sam Perry	6'5"	215	F	SR	Greenville, South Carolina
55	Karolis Petrukonis	6'11"	260	C	SO	Trakai, Lithuania
15	David Potter	6'6"	205	G/F	SO	Severn, Maryland
42	Julius Powell	6'7"	220	F	JR	Newton, North Carolina
1	K. C. Rivers	6'5"	215	G/F	JR	Charlotte, North Carolina
2	Demontez Stitt	6'2"	170	G	FR	Matthews, North Carolina
12	Raymond Sykes	6'9"	220	C/F	JR	Jacksonville, Florida
44	Jesse Yanutola	6'4"	215	F	SR	Tega Cay, South Carolina

== Schedule and results ==
Date time, TV	Rank^{#}	Opponent^{#}	Result	Record	Site (attendance) city, state
Exhibition
10/20/07; 10:00am		Orange & White Scrimmage			Littlejohn Coliseum; Clemson, SC
11/06/07*; 4:00pm		Augusta State	W 79–66		Littlejohn Coliseum (2,500); Clemson, SC
Regular season
11/12/07*; 7:30pm		Furman	W 91–46	1–0	Littlejohn Coliseum (7,694); Clemson, SC
11/15/07*; 8:00pm, FSNS		at Mississippi State	W 84–82	2–0	Humphrey Coliseum (9,950); Starkville, MS
11/18/07*; 2:00pm, ACC Select		Old Dominion	W 66–53	3–0	Littlejohn Coliseum (6,528); Clemson, SC
11/21/07*; 7:30pm, ACC Select	No. 24	Presbyterian	W 74–57	4–0	Littlejohn Coliseum (7,313); Clemson, SC
11/24/07*; Noon, ACC Select	No. 24	Gardner-Webb	W 96–67	5–0	Littlejohn Coliseum (6,320); Clemson, SC
11/27/07*; 9:30pm, ESPN2	No. 18	Purdue; ACC–Big Ten Challenge	W 61–58	6–0	Littlejohn Coliseum (7,350); Clemson, SC
12/01/07*; 4:00pm, FSN	No. 18	South Carolina; Carolina-Clemson Rivalry	W 85–74	7–0	Littlejohn Coliseum (9,281); Clemson, SC
12/05/07*; 7:00pm, CSS	No. 18	at East Carolina	W 82–67	8–0	Williams Arena at Minges Coliseum (6,556); Greenville, NC
12/20/07*; 3:00pm	No. 15	at UPR-Mayagüez; San Juan Shootout	W 90–73	9–0	Mario Morales Coliseum (N/A); Guaynabo, PR
12/21/07*; 3:00pm	No. 15	vs. DePaul; San Juan Shootout	W 90–74	10–0	Mario Morales Coliseum (121); Guaynabo, Puerto Rico
12/22/07*; 5:30pm	No. 15	vs. Mississippi; San Juan Shootout	L 82–85	10–1	Mario Morales Coliseum (324); Guaynabo, Puerto Rico
12/29/07*; 4:00pm, ACC Select	No. 21	Samford	W 78–45	11–1	Littlejohn Coliseum (9,512); Clemson, SC
1/01/08*; 4:30pm, FSN	No. 19	at Alabama	W 87–61	12–1	Coleman Coliseum (9,316); Tuscaloosa, AL
1/06/08; 7:30pm, FSN	No. 19	No. 1 North Carolina	L 88–90 ^{OT}	12–2 (0–1)	Littlejohn Coliseum (10,000); Clemson, SC
1/09/08*; 7:30pm, ACC Select	No. 18	Charlotte	L 72–82	12–3	Littlejohn Coliseum (9,349); Clemson, SC
1/12/08; 7:00pm, ACC Select	No. 18	Florida State	W 97–85 ^{2OT}	13–3 (1–1)	Littlejohn Coliseum (10,000); Clemson, SC
1/15/08; 7:00pm, RSN	No. 24	North Carolina State	W 70–54	14–3 (2–1)	Littlejohn Coliseum (9,046); Clemson, SC
1/19/08; 6:00pm, ESPN	No. 24	at No. 7 Duke	L 80–93	14–4 (2–2)	Cameron Indoor Stadium (9,314); Durham, NC
1/22/08; 7:00pm, RSN		Wake Forest	W 80–75 ^{OT}	15–4 (3–2)	Littlejohn Coliseum (8,349); Clemson, SC
1/27/08; 1:00pm, R/LF		at Miami (FL)	L 72–75	15–5 (3–3)	BankUnited Center (4,859); Coral Gables, FL
2/02/08; 8:00pm, ACC Select		Boston College	W 78–56	16–5 (4–3)	Littlejohn Coliseum (10,000); Clemson, SC
2/07/08; 7:00pm, ESPN2		at Virginia	W 82–51	17–5 (5–3)	John Paul Jones Arena (13,929); Charlottesville, VA
2/10/08; 6:30pm, FSN		at No. 3 North Carolina	L 93–103 ^{2OT}	17–6 (5–4)	Dean Smith Center (20,767); Chapel Hill, NC
2/14/08; 9:00pm, R/LF Split		Georgia Tech	W 82–67	18–6 (6–4)	Littlejohn Coliseum (7,650); Clemson, SC
2/16/08; 3:00pm, R/LF Split		at North Carolina State	W 71–64	19–6 (7–4)	RBC Center (18,985); Raleigh, NC
2/19/08; 7:00pm, FSN		at Florida State	L 55–64	19–7 (7–5)	Donald L. Tucker Center (7,075); Tallahassee, FL
2/27/08; 7:30pm, ACC Select		Miami (FL)	W 79–69	20–7 (8–5)	Littlejohn Coliseum (9,347); Clemson, SC
3/02/08; 7:30pm, FSN		at Maryland	W 73–70	21–7 (9–5)	Comcast Center (17,950); College Park, MD
3/06/08; 7:00pm, ESPN	No. 24	at Georgia Tech	L 75–80	21–8 (9–6)	Alexander Memorial Coliseum (9,191); Atlanta, GA
3/09/08; 1:30pm, R/LF	No. 24	Virginia Tech	W 70–69	22–8 (10–6)	Littlejohn Coliseum (10,000); Clemson, SC
ACC tournament
3/14/08; 9:00pm, RLF/ESPN2		vs. Boston College; Quarterfinals	W 82–48	23–8	Charlotte Bobcats Arena (20,035); Charlotte, NC
3/15/08; 3:30pm, RLF/ESPN		vs. No. 7 Duke; Semifinals	W 78–74	24–8	Charlotte Bobcats Arena (20,035); Charlotte, NC
3/16/08; 1:00pm, RLF/ESPN2		vs. No. 1 North Carolina; Finals	L 81–86	24–9	Charlotte Bobcats Arena (20,035); Charlotte, NC
NCAA tournament
3/21/08*; 9:55pm, CBS	No. 22	vs. Villanova; First Round	L 69–75	24–10	St. Pete Times Forum (15,328); Tampa, FL
*Non-conference game. ^{#}Rankings from AP Poll. (#) Tournament seedings in parentheses. All times are in Eastern Standard Time.

== Rankings ==
Ranking Movement	Week																			
Poll	Pre	1	2	3	4	5	6	7	8	9	10	11	12	13	14	15	16	17	18	Final
USA Today/ESPN Coaches	RV	RV	22	22	18	17	15	20	19	19	23	25	RV	RV	RV	RV	RV	RV	22	RV
Associated Press	RV	RV	24	24	18	18	15	21	19	18	24	RV	RV	RV	RV	RV	RV	24	22	22
