= 2007–08 Virginia Tech Hokies men's basketball team =

American college basketball season

2007–08 Virginia Tech Hokies men's basketball

NIT, Quarterfinals
- Conference: Atlantic Coast Conference
- Record: 21–14 (9–7 ACC)
- Head coach: Seth Greenberg
- Assistant coaches: James Johnson; Ryan Odom; Stacey Palimore
- Home arena: Cassell Coliseum

2007–08 ACC men's basketball standings
	Conf.				Overall
Team	W		L	PCT	W		L	PCT
No. 1 North Carolina †	14	–	2	.875	36	–	3	.923
No. 9 Duke	13	–	3	.813	28	–	6	.824
No. 22 Clemson	10	–	6	.625	24	–	10	.706
Virginia Tech	9	–	7	.563	21	–	14	.600
Miami (FL)	8	–	8	.500	23	–	11	.676
Maryland	8	–	8	.500	19	–	15	.559
Georgia Tech	7	–	9	.438	15	–	17	.469
Wake Forest	7	–	9	.438	17	–	13	.567
Florida State	7	–	9	.438	19	–	15	.559
Virginia	5	–	11	.313	17	–	16	.515
Boston College	4	–	12	.250	14	–	17	.452
NC State	4	–	12	.250	15	–	16	.484
† 2008 ACC tournament winner Rankings from AP Poll

The 2007–08 Virginia Tech Hokies men's basketball team is an NCAA Division I college basketball team competing in the Atlantic Coast Conference. The Hokies lost five seniors off of their 2006–07 season team, which finished as the third place team in the conference.

== Coaching staff ==
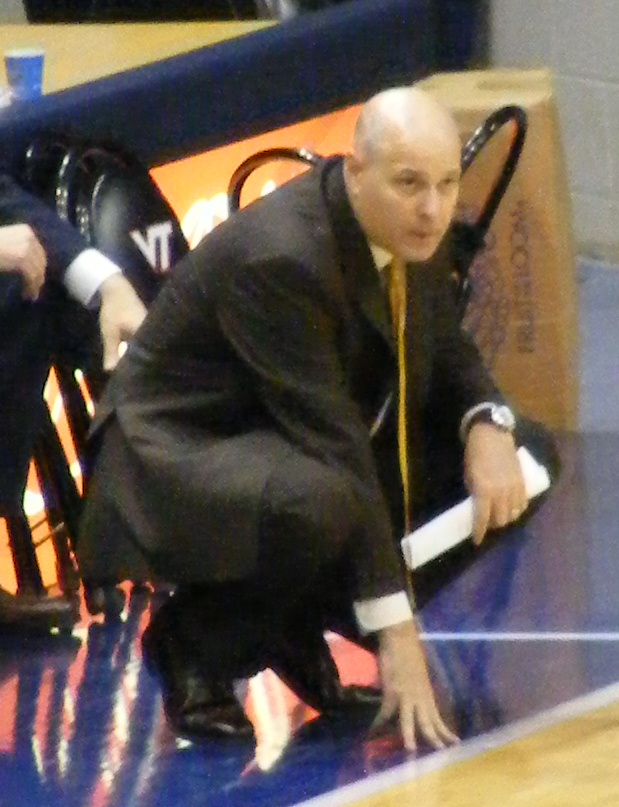
Seth Greenberg, head coach

Position	Name	First year at VT
Head coach	Seth Greenberg	2003
Assistant coach	James Johnson	2007
Assistant coach	Ryan Odom	2003
Assistant coach	Stacey Palmore	2004
Source: http://www.hokiesports.com/mbasketball/players/

== Roster ==
Note: Flags indicate national team eligibility at FIBA sanctioned events. Players may hold other non-FIBA nationality not displayed.

No.		Position	Player
0	(United States)	F	**Jeff Allen**
1	(United States)	F	Terrell Bell
3	(United States)	G	Tom Amalfe
5	(United States)	G	Marcus Travis
10	(United States)	G	Hank Thorns
13	(United States)	F/G	**Deron Washington**
15	(United States)	F	Terrance Vinson

No.		Position	Player
21	(United States)	F	Lewis Witcher
23	(United States)	G	**Malcolm Delaney**
32	(United States)	G	Paul Debnam
33	(United States)	F	J. T. Thompson
34	(Mali)	F	**Cheick Diakite**
40	(Puerto Rico)	F/G	**A. D. Vassallo**

Starters are indicated in bold

== Schedule and results ==
Date	Opponent	Location	Result	Overall	Conf.
**Regular Season**
November 9, 2007	Elon	Blacksburg, VA	W 69–64	1–0	0–0
November 22, 2007	Eastern Washington^{1}	Anchorage, AK	W 69–52	2–0	0–0
November 23, 2007	#22 Butler^{1}	Anchorage, AK	L 78–84 (OT)	2–1	0–0
November 24, 2007	#14 Gonzaga^{1}	Anchorage, AK	L 64–82	2–2	0–0
November 28, 2007	Penn State^{2}	University Park, PA	L 61–66	2–3	0–0
December 1, 2007	UNC Asheville	Blacksburg, VA	W 65–51	3–3	0–0
December 4, 2007	UNC Greensboro	Blacksburg, VA	W 67–39	4–3	0–0
December 9, 2007	George Washington	Blacksburg, VA	W 68–36	5–3	0–0
December 16, 2007	Old Dominion	Norfolk, VA	L 69–72	5–4	0–0
December 19, 2007	Liberty	Blacksburg, VA	W 58–46	6–4	0–0
December 23, 2007	**Wake Forest**	Winston-Salem, NC	L 75–77	6–5	0–1
December 28, 2007	Hofstra^{3}	Madison Square Garden, NY	W 84–59	7–5	0–1
December 29, 2007	St. John's^{3}	Madison Square Garden, NY	W 54–48	8–5	0–1
January 3, 2008	Richmond	Richmond, VA	L 49–52	8–6	0–1
January 7, 2008	Charleston Southern	Blacksburg, VA	W 79–49	9–6	0–1
January 12, 2008	**Maryland**	Blacksburg, VA	W 67–66	10–6	1–1
January 16, 2008	**Virginia**	Charlottesville, VA	W 70–69 OT	11–6	2–1
January 19, 2008	**Georgia Tech**	Atlanta, GA	L 70–81	11–7	2–2
January 24, 2008	#4 **Duke**	Blacksburg, VA	L 64–81	11–8	2–3
January 26, 2008	**Boston College**	Chestnut Hill, MA	W 81–73 OT	12–8	3–3
January 29, 2008	**Florida State**	Blacksburg, VA	W 89–80	13–8	4–3
February 2, 2008	**Virginia**	Blacksburg, VA	W 72–65 OT	14–8	5–3
February 5, 2008	**NC State**	Raleigh, NC	L 63–73	14–9	5–4
February 9, 2008	**Miami**	Blacksburg, VA	L 71–74	14–10	5–5
February 16, 2008	#5 **North Carolina**	Chapel Hill, NC	L 53–92	14–11	5–6
February 20, 2008	**Maryland**	College Park, MD	W 69–65	15–11	6–6
February 23, 2008	**Georgia Tech**	Blacksburg, VA	W 92–84	16–11	7–6
February 26, 2008	**Boston College**	Blacksburg, VA	W 67–48	17–11	8–6
March 4, 2008	**Wake Forest**	Blacksburg, VA	W 80–58	18–11	9–6
March 9, 2007	#24 **Clemson**	Clemson, SC	L 69–70	18–12	9–7
**ACC tournament**
March 14, 2008	Miami	Charlotte, NC	W 63–49	19–12	
March 15, 2008	#1 North Carolina	Charlotte, NC	L 66–68	19–13	
**NIT tournament**
March 19, 2008	Morgan State	Blacksburg, VA	W 94–62	20–13	
March 24, 2008	UAB	Blacksburg, VA	W 75–49	21–13	
March 26, 2008	Ole Miss	Blacksburg, VA	L 72–81	21–14	
*Conference games in **bold**. ^{1}Great Alaska Shootout, ^{2}ACC–Big Ten Challenge, ^{3}ECAC Holiday Festival, rankings from the AP Poll at the time of the game

NIT, Quarterfinals
