= 2007–08 Virginia Cavaliers men's basketball team =

American college basketball season

2007–08 Virginia Cavaliers men's basketball

CBI, Semifinals
- Conference: Atlantic Coast Conference
- Record: 17–16 (5–11 ACC)
- Head coach: Dave Leitao (3rd season)
- Assistant coaches: Bill Courtney (3rd season); Steve Seymour (3rd season); Drew Diener (1st season)
- Home arena: John Paul Jones Arena

2007–08 ACC men's basketball standings
	Conf.				Overall
Team	W		L	PCT	W		L	PCT
No. 1 North Carolina †	14	–	2	.875	36	–	3	.923
No. 9 Duke	13	–	3	.813	28	–	6	.824
No. 22 Clemson	10	–	6	.625	24	–	10	.706
Virginia Tech	9	–	7	.563	21	–	14	.600
Miami (FL)	8	–	8	.500	23	–	11	.676
Maryland	8	–	8	.500	19	–	15	.559
Georgia Tech	7	–	9	.438	15	–	17	.469
Wake Forest	7	–	9	.438	17	–	13	.567
Florida State	7	–	9	.438	19	–	15	.559
Virginia	5	–	11	.313	17	–	16	.515
Boston College	4	–	12	.250	14	–	17	.452
NC State	4	–	12	.250	15	–	16	.484
† 2008 ACC tournament winner Rankings from AP Poll

The 2007–08 Virginia Cavaliers men's basketball team is an NCAA Division I college basketball team competing in the Atlantic Coast Conference. The Cavaliers sought to continue their 2006–07 season success in which they finished tied for first place in the conference with North Carolina (see 2006–07 Atlantic Coast Conference men's basketball season).

The Cavaliers were picked to finish 5th place for the 2007–2008 season in the ACC Preseason Poll. Senior Sean Singletary was named to the five-member preseason All-ACC team.

== Players ==
=== Roster ===
2007–08 Virginia Cavaliers men's basketball team
Players
Coaches

Pos.	#	Name	Height	Weight	Year	Previous school	Hometown
G	1	Jeff Jones	6 ft 4 in (1.93 m)	192 lb (87 kg)	Fr	Monsignor Bonner	Chester, Pa.
G	2	Mustapha Farrakhan, Jr.	6 ft 4 in (1.93 m)	180 lb (82 kg)	Fr	Thornton Township	Harvey, Ill.
G	4	Calvin Baker	6 ft 2 in (1.88 m)	180 lb (82 kg)	RS So	Woodside/William & Mary	Newport News, Virginia
F	11	Laurynas Mikalauskas	6 ft 8 in (2.03 m)	255 lb (116 kg)	Jr	Blue Ridge School	Palanga, Lithuania
F	12	Jamil Tucker	6 ft 8 in (2.03 m)	230 lb (104 kg)	So	West Side	Gary, Indiana
G	13	Sammy Zeglinski	6 ft 0 in (1.83 m)	175 lb (79 kg)	Fr	William Penn Charter School	Philadelphia
C	21	Tunji Soroye	6 ft 11 in (2.11 m)	245 lb (111 kg)	Sr	Montrose Christian	Dugbe Ibadan, Nigeria
F	22	Will Sherrill	6 ft 9 in (2.06 m)	208 lb (94 kg)	Fr	Phillips Academy Andover	New York City
G/F	24	Mamadi Diane	6 ft 5 in (1.96 m)	197 lb (89 kg)	Jr	DeMatha Catholic	Potomac, Maryland
F	30	Adrian Joseph (C)	6 ft 7 in (2.01 m)	205 lb (93 kg)	Sr	Brewster Academy	San Fernando, Trinidad
F	31	Andy Burns	6 ft 8 in (2.03 m)	202 lb (92 kg)	So	Bishop Ireton	Alexandria, Virginia
F	32	Mike Scott	6 ft 8 in (2.03 m)	225 lb (102 kg)	Fr	Deep Creek/Hargrave Military	Chesapeake, Virginia
F/C	34	Ryan Pettinella	6 ft 9 in (2.06 m)	238 lb (108 kg)	Sr	McQuaid Jesuit	Webster, New York
G/F	43	Will Harris	6 ft 6 in (1.98 m)	230 lb (104 kg)	So	Brewster Academy	Corona, New York
G	44	Sean Singletary (C)	6 ft 0 in (1.83 m)	185 lb (84 kg)	Sr	William Penn Charter School	Philadelphia
G/F	45	Solomon Tat	6 ft 5 in (1.96 m)	220 lb (100 kg)	So	Community Christian School	Jos Plateau, Nigeria
F/C	55	Jerome Meyinsse	6 ft 8 in (2.03 m)	230 lb (104 kg)	So	McKinley	Baton Rouge, Louisiana

Head coach

- Dave Leitao (Northeastern)

Assistant coach(es)

- Bill Courtney (Bucknell)
- Steve Seymour (Bridgewater (MA))
- Drew Diener (St. Louis)

Legend

- (C) Team captain
- (S) Suspended
- (I) Ineligible
- (W) Walk-on
- Injured
- Current redshirt

Roster
Last update: 12 December 2014

=== Recruits ===
The Virginia Cavalier 2007 recruiting class consisted of four signed players. The class was headlined by consensus four star shooting guard Jeff Jones.

College recruiting (2007)
Name	Hometown	School	Height	Weight	Commit date
Mustapha Farrakhan; SG	Harvey, Illinois	Thornton Township High School	6 ft 3 in (1.91 m)	170 lb (77 kg)	Nov 14, 2006
Mustapha Farrakhan; SG	Recruit ratings: Scout: Rivals: (86)				
Jeff Jones; SG	Drexel Hill, Pennsylvania	Monsignor Bonner High School	6 ft 4 in (1.93 m)	185 lb (84 kg)	Aug 18, 2006
Jeff Jones; SG	Recruit ratings: Scout: Rivals: (89)				
Mike Scott; PF	Chesapeake, Virginia	Deep Creek High School	6 ft 8 in (2.03 m)	215 lb (98 kg)	Nov 28, 2006
Mike Scott; PF	Recruit ratings: Scout: Rivals: (80)				
Sam Zeglinski; PG	Philadelphia, Pennsylvania	William Penn Charter School	6 ft 1 in (1.85 m)	180 lb (82 kg)	Sep 25, 2005
Sam Zeglinski; PG	Recruit ratings: Scout: Rivals: (84)				
Overall recruit ranking:
Note: In many cases, Scout, Rivals, 247Sports, On3, and ESPN may conflict in their listings of height and weight.; In these cases, the average was taken. ESPN grades are on a 100-point scale.; Sources: "UVa Commit List 2007". Rivals.; "Scout.com Recruiting: UVa". Scout.; "2007 Player Commitments – UVa". ESPN.; "Scout.com Team Recruiting Rankings". Scout.; "2007 Team Ranking". Rivals.

=== Watch list ===
- Sean Singletary
  - Pre-season All American (CBS Sportsline, Collegehoops.net, CollegeInsider.com)
  - Wooden Award Candidate
  - Naismith Award Candidate
  - Bob Cousy Award Candidate
  - Pre-season All Atlantic Coast Conference

== Schedule and results ==
Date time, TV	Rank^{#}	Opponent^{#}	Result	Record	Site (attendance) city, state
Non-conference regular season
Nov. 11*; 2:00 pm		Vermont	W 90–72	1–0	John Paul Jones Arena (11,893); Charlottesville, Virginia
Nov. 14*; 7:00 pm		Howard	W 92–53	2–0	John Paul Jones Arena (11,162); Charlottesville, Virginia
Nov. 17*; 10:30 pm, FSN		at No. 17 Arizona	W 75–72	3–0	McKale Center (14,602); Tucson, Arizona
Nov. 20*; 8:00 pm, CN8	No. 23	Drexel; Philly Classic	W 72–58	4–0	John Paul Jones Arena (10,975); Charlottesville, Virginia
Nov. 23*; 9:00 pm, CN8	No. 23	vs. Pennsylvania; Philly Classic	W 100–85	5–0	The Palestra (3,116); Philadelphia, Pennsylvania
Nov. 24*; 9:00 pm, CN8	No. 23	vs. Seton Hall; Philly Classic	L 60–74	5–1	The Palestra (3,871); Philadelphia, Pennsylvania
Nov. 27*; 7:00 pm, ESPNU		Northwestern; ACC–Big Ten Challenge	W 94–52	6–1	John Paul Jones Arena (12,609); Charlottesville, Virginia
Dec. 5*; 7:30 pm, ESPN2		Syracuse	L 68–70	6–2	John Paul Jones Arena (13,603 ) Charlottesville, Virginia
Dec. 7*; 7:00 pm		Longwood	W 76–57	7–2	John Paul Jones Arena (11,366); Charlottesville, Virginia
Dec. 19*; 7:00 pm		Hampton	W 79–65	8–2	John Paul Jones Arena (10,516); Charlottesville, Virginia
Dec. 22*; 2:00 pm, CSN		Elon	W 91–61	9–2	John Paul Jones Arena (11,626); Charlottesville, Virginia
Dec. 30*; 3:00 pm		Hartford	W 78–70	10–2	John Paul Jones Arena (11,647); Charlottesville, Virginia
Jan. 3*; 9:00 pm, CSTV		at Xavier	L 70–108	10–3	Cintas Center (10,073); Cincinnati
Conference regular season
Jan. 13; 8:00 pm, FSN		at No. 7 Duke	L 65–87	10–4 (0–1)	Cameron Indoor Stadium (9,314); Durham, North Carolina
Jan. 16; 7:00 pm, ESPNU		Virginia Tech	L 69–70	10–5 (0–2)	John Paul Jones Arena (14,433); Charlottesville, Virginia
Jan. 19; 8:00 pm, RLF		Boston College	W 84–66	11–5 (1–2)	John Paul Jones Arena (14,039); Charlottesville, Virginia
Jan. 23; 7:00 pm		at Florida State	L 66–69	11–6 (1–3)	Donald L. Tucker Center (7,314); Tallahassee, Florida
Jan. 27; 4:30 pm, FSN		Georgia Tech	L 82–92 ^{OT}	11–7 (1–4)	John Paul Jones Arena (14,138); Charlottesville, Virginia
Jan. 30; 7:00 pm, ESPN		at Maryland	L 75–95	11–8 (1–5)	Comcast Center (17,950); College Park, Maryland
Feb. 2; 1:00 pm, RLF		at Virginia Tech	L 65–72 ^{OT}	11–9 (1–6)	Cassell Coliseum (9,847); Blacksburg, Virginia
Feb. 7; 7:00 pm, ESPN2		Clemson	L 51–82	11–10 (1–7)	John Paul Jones Arena (13,929); Charlottesville, Virginia
Feb. 9; 3:30 pm, ABC		at Wake Forest	L 64-80	11–11 (1–8)	LJVM Coliseum (14,179); Winston-Salem, North Carolina
Feb. 12; 8:00 pm, ESPN2/RLF		No. 5 North Carolina	L 74–75	11–12 (1–9)	John Paul Jones Arena (13,765); Charlottesville, Virginia
Feb. 17; 1:00 pm, RLF		at Boston College	W 79–74	12–12 (2–9)	Silvio O. Conte Forum (7,154); Chestnut Hill, Massachusetts
Feb. 24; 4:30 pm, FSN		NC State	W 78–60	13–12 (3–9)	John Paul Jones Arena (13,630); Charlottesville, Virginia
Mar. 1; 2:00 pm, RLF		at Miami	L 93–95	13–13 (3–10)	BankUnited Center (6,128); Coral Gables, Florida
Mar. 3; 7:00 pm, RSN		Georgia Tech	W 76–74	14–13 (4–10)	Alexander Memorial Coliseum (9,191); Atlanta, Georgia
Mar. 5; 7:00 pm, ESPN		No. 6 Duke	L 70–86	14–14 (4–11)	John Paul Jones Arena (14,273); Charlottesville, Virginia
Mar. 9; 7:30 pm, FSN		Maryland	W 91–76	15–14 (5–11)	John Paul Jones Arena (14,154); Charlottesville, Virginia
ACC Tournament
Mar. 13; 7:00 pm, ESPN		vs. Georgia Tech; ACC tournament	L 76–94	15–15	Charlotte Bobcats Arena (20,035); Charlotte, North Carolina
College Basketball Invitational
Mar. 18*; 7:00 pm, FCS		Richmond; CBI First Round	W 66–64	16–15	John Paul Jones Arena (4,022); Charlottesville, Virginia
Mar. 24*; 7:00 pm, FCS		Old Dominion; CBI Quarterfinals	W 80–76	17–15	John Paul Jones Arena (6,460); Charlottesville, Virginia
Mar. 26*; 7:00 pm, FCS		Bradley; CBI Semifinals	L 85–96	17–16	John Paul Jones Arena (5,852); Charlottesville, Virginia
*Non-conference game. ^{#}Rankings from Associated Press Poll prior to game. (#) Tournament seedings in parentheses. All times are in Eastern Time.
