= 2007–08 Duke Blue Devils men's basketball team =

American college basketball season

2007–08 Duke Blue Devils men's basketball

Maui Invitational champions

NCAA tournament, Round of 32
- Conference: Atlantic Coast Conference

Ranking
- Coaches: No. 16
- AP: No. 9
- Record: 28–6 (13–3 ACC)
- Head coach: Mike Krzyzewski (28th season)
- Assistant coaches: Johnny Dawkins; Chris Collins; Steve Wojciechowski
- Home arena: Cameron Indoor Stadium

2007–08 ACC men's basketball standings
	Conf.				Overall
Team	W		L	PCT	W		L	PCT
No. 1 North Carolina †	14	–	2	.875	36	–	3	.923
No. 9 Duke	13	–	3	.813	28	–	6	.824
No. 22 Clemson	10	–	6	.625	24	–	10	.706
Virginia Tech	9	–	7	.563	21	–	14	.600
Miami (FL)	8	–	8	.500	23	–	11	.676
Maryland	8	–	8	.500	19	–	15	.559
Georgia Tech	7	–	9	.438	15	–	17	.469
Wake Forest	7	–	9	.438	17	–	13	.567
Florida State	7	–	9	.438	19	–	15	.559
Virginia	5	–	11	.313	17	–	16	.515
Boston College	4	–	12	.250	14	–	17	.452
NC State	4	–	12	.250	15	–	16	.484
† 2008 ACC tournament winner Rankings from AP Poll

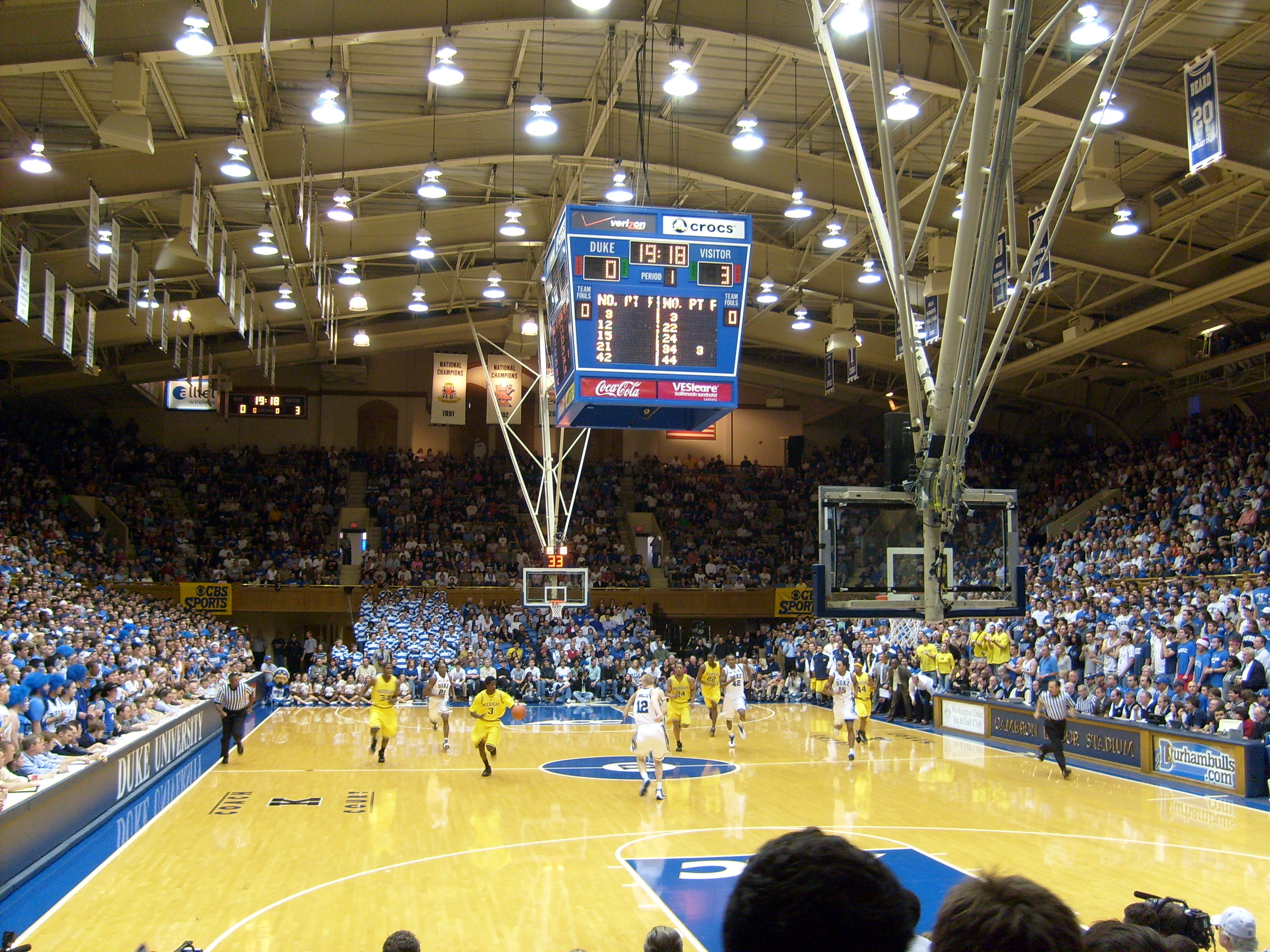
Michigan at Duke, December 8

The 2007–08 Duke Blue Devils men's basketball team represented Duke University. The head coach was Mike Krzyzewski, serving for his 28th year. The team played its home games in Cameron Indoor Stadium in Durham, North Carolina. The team finished with a 28–6 (13–3) record, while making it to the second round of the NCAA tournament. Senior DeMarcus Nelson was the sole senior and captain for the 2007–2008 squad, starting at shooting guard. Junior Greg Paulus (point guard), sophomores Gerald Henderson, Jr. (guard/forward) and Lance Thomas (forward), and freshman Kyle Singler (forward) rounded out the rest of the starting lineup. Jon Scheyer (shooting guard) served as the sixth man, playing significant minutes off the bench.

== Recruiting ==
College recruiting
Name	Hometown	School	Height	Weight	Commit date
Taylor King; SF	Huntington Beach, California	Santa Ana Mater Dei High School	6 ft 6 in (1.98 m)	230 lb (100 kg)	Jan 12, 2006
Taylor King; SF	Recruit ratings: Scout: Rivals: (97)				
Kyle Singler; SF	Medford, Oregon	South Medford High School	6 ft 8 in (2.03 m)	230 lb (100 kg)	Oct 26, 2006
Kyle Singler; SF	Recruit ratings: Scout: Rivals: (98)				
Nolan Smith; SG	Upper Marlboro, Maryland	Oak Hill Academy (VA)	6 ft 2 in (1.88 m)	185 lb (84 kg)	Jan 12, 2006
Nolan Smith; SG	Recruit ratings: Scout: Rivals: (98)				
Overall recruit ranking: Scout: 6 Rivals: 5 ESPN: N/A
Note: In many cases, Scout, Rivals, 247Sports, On3, and ESPN may conflict in their listings of height and weight.; In these cases, the average was taken. ESPN grades are on a 100-point scale.; Sources: "Duke Basketball Commitments". Rivals.; "2008 Duke Basketball Commits". Scout.; "ESPN". ESPN.; "Scout.com Team Recruiting Rankings". Scout.; "2007 Team Ranking". Rivals.

== Roster ==
Name	Number	Position	Height	Weight	Year	Hometown
Jordan Davidson	41	G	6–1	180	Junior	Melbourne, Arkansas
Gerald Henderson, Jr.	15	G	6–4	210	Sophomore	Merion, Pennsylvania
Steve Johnson	51	F	6–5	195	Sophomore	Colorado Springs, Colorado
Taylor King	20	F	6–6	230	Freshman	Huntington Beach, California
David McClure	14	F	6–6	200	Junior	Ridgefield, Connecticut
DeMarcus Nelson(c)	21	G	6–4	200	Senior	Elk Grove, California
Greg Paulus	3	G	6–1	185	Junior	Syracuse, New York
Martynas Pocius	5	G/F	6–5	190	Junior	Vilnius, Lithuania
Jon Scheyer	30	G	6–5	180	Sophomore	Northbrook, Illinois
Kyle Singler	12	F	6–8	220	Freshman	Medford, Oregon
Nolan Smith	2	G	6–2	180	Freshman	Upper Marlboro, Maryland
Lance Thomas	42	F	6–8	220	Sophomore	Scotch Plains, New Jersey
Brian Zoubek	55	C	7–1	260	Sophomore	Haddonfield, New Jersey

== Rankings ==
Ranking movements Legend: ██ Increase in ranking ██ Decrease in ranking
	Week																			
Poll	Pre	1	2	3	4	5	6	7	8	9	10	11	12	13	14	15	16	17	18	Final
AP	13	13	13	7	6	6	6	10	9	9	7	4	3	2	2	5	7	6	7	9
Coaches	11	10	10	7	7	7	7	10	8	7	5	3	3	2	2	4	6	5	7	9

== Schedule ==
Date time, TV	Rank^{#}	Opponent^{#}	Result	Record	Site (attendance) city, state
October 27, 2007*; 7:00 pm		Blue/White; Scrimmage			Cameron Indoor Stadium; Durham, NC
Exhibition
November 1, 2007*; 6:30 pm		Shaw; Exhibition	W 134–55		Cameron Indoor Stadium; Durham, NC
November 3, 2007*; 5:00 pm		Barton College; Exhibition	W 105–44		Cameron Indoor Stadium; Durham, NC
Regular season
November 9, 2007*; 7:00 pm, ACC Select	No. 11	North Carolina Central	W 121–56	1–0	Cameron Indoor Stadium (9,314); Durham, NC
November 12, 2007*; 7:00 pm, ESPN2	No. 10	New Mexico State	W 86–61	2–0	Cameron Indoor Stadium (9,314); Durham, NC
November 19, 2007*; 9:00 pm, ESPN2	No. 10	vs. Princeton; EA Sports Maui Invitational Tournament	W 83–61	3–0	Lahaina Civic Center (2,500); Lahaina, HI
November 20, 2007*; 9:00 pm, ESPN2	No. 10	vs. Illinois; EA Sports Maui Invitational Tournament	W 79–66	4–0	Lahaina Civic Center (2,500); Lahaina, HI
November 21, 2007*; 10:00 pm, ESPN	No. 10	vs. No. 11 Marquette; EA Sports Maui Invitational Tournament	W 77–73	5–0	Lahaina Civic Center (2,500); Lahaina, HI
November 25, 2007*; 1:00 pm, FSN	No. 10	Eastern Kentucky	W 78–43	6–0	Cameron Indoor Stadium (9,314); Durham, NC
November 27, 2007*; 9:00 pm, ESPN	No. 7	No. 20 Wisconsin; ACC–Big Ten Challenge	W 85–58	7–0	Cameron Indoor Stadium (9,314); Durham, NC
December 1, 2007*; 12:00 pm, ESPNU	No. 7	at Davidson	W 79–73	8–0	Charlotte Bobcats Arena (17,034); Charlotte, NC
December 8, 2007*; 2:00 pm, CBS	No. 7	Michigan	W 95–67	9–0	Cameron Indoor Stadium (9,314); Durham, NC
December 17, 2007*; 7:00 pm, ESPN2	No. 7	Albany	W 117–70	10–0	Cameron Indoor Stadium (9,314); Durham, NC
December 20, 2007*; 7:00 pm, ESPN	No. 7	vs. No. 11 Pittsburgh; Aeropostale Classic	L 64–65 ^{OT}	10–1	Madison Square Garden (19,544); New York, NY
January 6, 2008*; 5:30 pm, FSN	No. 8	Cornell	W 81–67	11–1	Cameron Indoor Stadium (9,314); Durham, NC
January 9, 2008*; 7:00 pm, ESPN	No. 7	at Temple	W 74–64	12–1	Wachovia Center (18,030); Philadelphia, PA
January 13, 2008; 8:00 pm, FSN	No. 7	Virginia	W 87–65	13–1 (1–0)	Cameron Indoor Stadium (9,314); Durham, NC
January 16, 2008; 7:00 pm, ESPN	No. 5	at Florida State	W 70–57	14–1 (2–0)	Donald L. Tucker Center (11,548); Tallahassee, FL
January 19, 2008; 6:00 pm, ESPN	No. 5	No. 24 Clemson	W 93–80	15–1 (3–0)	Cameron Indoor Stadium (9,314); Durham, NC
January 24, 2008; 7:00 pm, ESPN	No. 3	Virginia Tech	W 81–64	16–1 (4–0)	Cassell Coliseum (9,847); Blacksburg, VA
January 27, 2008; 6:30 pm, FSN	No. 3	at Maryland	W 93–84	17–1 (5–0)	Comcast Center (17,950); Park, MD
January 31, 2008; 9:00 pm, Raycom/ESPN2	No. 3	North Carolina State	W 92–82	18–1 (6–0)	Cameron Indoor Stadium (9,314); Durham, NC
February 2, 2008; 3:30 pm, ABC	No. 3	Miami (FL)	W 88–73	19–1 (7–0)	Cameron Indoor Stadium (9,314); Durham, NC
February 6, 2008; 9:00 pm, Raycom/ESPN	No. 2	at No. 3 North Carolina	W 89–78	20–1 (8–0)	Dean Smith Center (21,750); Chapel Hill, NC
February 9, 2008; 1:00 pm, CBS	No. 2	Boston College	W 90–80	21–1 (9–0)	Cameron Indoor Stadium (9,314); Durham, NC
February 13, 2008; 7:00 pm, ESPN	No. 2	Maryland	W 77–65	22–1 (10–0)	Cameron Indoor Stadium (9,314); Durham, NC
February 17, 2008; 7:30 pm, FSN	No. 2	at Wake Forest	L 73–86	22–2 (10–1)	Lawrence Joel Veterans Memorial Coliseum (14,646); Winston-Salem, NC
February 20, 2008; 9:00 pm, Raycom	No. 4	at Miami (FL)	L 95–96	22–3 (10–2)	BankUnited Center (6,670); Coral Gables, FL
February 23, 2008*; 4:00 pm, CBS	No. 4	St. John's	W 86–56	23–3	Cameron Indoor Stadium (9,314); Durham, NC
February 27, 2008; 9:00 pm, ESPN	No. 6	Georgia Tech	W 71–58	24–3 (11–2)	Cameron Indoor Stadium (9,314); Durham, NC
March 1, 2008; 12:00 pm, CBS	No. 6	at North Carolina State	W 87–86	25–3 (12–2)	RBC Center (17,742); Raleigh, NC
March 5, 2008; 7:00 pm, ESPN	No. 5	at Virginia	W 86–70	26–3 (13–2)	John Paul Jones Arena (14,273); Charlottesville, VA
March 8, 2008; 9:00 pm, ESPN	No. 5	No. 1 North Carolina; ESPN College GameDay	L 68–76	26–4 (13–3)	Cameron Indoor Stadium (9,314); Durham, NC
ACC Tournament
March 14, 2008; 7:00 pm, Raycom/ESPN2	No. 7	vs. Georgia Tech; ACC Tournament Quarterfinals	W 82–70	27–4	Charlotte Bobcats Arena (20,035); Charlotte, NC
March 15, 2008; 4:00 pm, Raycom/ESPN	No. 7	vs. Clemson; ACC Tournament Semifinals	L 74–78	27–5	Charlotte Bobcats Arena (20,035); Charlotte, NC
NCAA tournament
March 20, 2008*; 7:10 pm, CBS	No. 9 (2)	vs. No. (15) Belmont; First Round	W 71–70	28–5	Verizon Center (18,400); Washington, D.C.
March 22, 2008*; 2:10 pm, CBS	No. 9 (2)	vs. No. (7) West Virginia; Second Round	L 67–73	28–6	Verizon Center (18,400); Washington, D.C.
*Non-conference game. ^{#}Rankings from Coaches' Poll. (#) Tournament seedings in parentheses.

== Accomplishments ==
- 15–1 record at home
- Ranked as high as #2 in the AP poll
- Began ACC with 10–0 record
- 8–3 record vs. teams in the NCAA tournament field during the regular season
- 4–2 record vs. ranked teams
- ACC honors:
  - DeMarcus Nelson was first team All-ACC and ACC Defensive Player of the Year
  - Kyle Singler was third team All-ACC and ACC Rookie of the Year
