= 2008 ACC men's basketball tournament =

- 2008 ACC Tournament logo
- Classification: Division I
- Season: 2007–08
- Teams: 12
- Site: Charlotte Bobcats Arena; Charlotte, North Carolina
- Champions: North Carolina (17th title)
- Winning coach: Roy Williams (2nd title)
- MVP: Tyler Hansbrough (North Carolina)
- Television: ESPN, Raycom Sports

The 2008 Atlantic Coast Conference men's basketball tournament took place from March 13 to 16, 2008, at the Charlotte Bobcats Arena in Charlotte, North Carolina. The tournament was broadcast on the ESPN family of networks, along with Raycom Sports in the ACC footprint. Both broadcasters had the games available in HD.

Florida State and Miami (FL) won their first-round games for the second year in a row. Miami became the first #5 seed to win an ACC tournament game since the conference expanded to 12 teams. The past two seasons, the #12 seed pulled off the upset.

Tyler Hansbrough of North Carolina was named tournament MVP.

2007–08 ACC men's basketball standings
	Conf.				Overall
Team	W		L	PCT	W		L	PCT
No. 1 North Carolina †	14	–	2	.875	36	–	3	.923
No. 9 Duke	13	–	3	.813	28	–	6	.824
No. 22 Clemson	10	–	6	.625	24	–	10	.706
Virginia Tech	9	–	7	.563	21	–	14	.600
Miami (FL)	8	–	8	.500	23	–	11	.676
Maryland	8	–	8	.500	19	–	15	.559
Georgia Tech	7	–	9	.438	15	–	17	.469
Wake Forest	7	–	9	.438	17	–	13	.567
Florida State	7	–	9	.438	19	–	15	.559
Virginia	5	–	11	.313	17	–	16	.515
Boston College	4	–	12	.250	14	–	17	.452
NC State	4	–	12	.250	15	–	16	.484
† 2008 ACC tournament winner Rankings from AP Poll

== Bracket ==
First round March 13, 2008
8	Wake Forest	60
9	Florida State	70
5	Miami (FL)	63
12	NC State	50
7	Georgia Tech	94
10	Virginia	76
6	Maryland	68
11	Boston College	71

Quarterfinals; March 14, 2008
1	#1 North Carolina	82
9	Florida State	70
4	Virginia Tech	63
5	Miami	49
2	#9 Duke	82
7	Georgia Tech	70
3	#22 Clemson	82
11	Boston College	48

Semifinals; March 15, 2008
1	#1 North Carolina	68
4	Virginia Tech	66
2	#9 Duke	74
3	#22 Clemson	78

Championship Game; March 16, 2008
1	#1 North Carolina	86
3	#22 Clemson	81

AP Rankings at time of tournament
