= 2007–08 North Carolina Tar Heels men's basketball team =

American college basketball season

2007–08 North Carolina Tar Heels men's basketball

ACC Tournament Champions ACC Regular Season Champions

NCAA tournament, Final Four
- Conference: Atlantic Coast Conference

Ranking
- Coaches: No. 3
- AP: No. 1
- Record: 36–3 (14–2 ACC)
- Head coach: Roy Williams (5th season)
- Assistant coaches: Joe Holladay; Steve Robinson; Jerod Haase
- Home arena: Dean Smith Center

2007–08 ACC men's basketball standings
	Conf.				Overall
Team	W		L	PCT	W		L	PCT
No. 1 North Carolina †	14	–	2	.875	36	–	3	.923
No. 9 Duke	13	–	3	.813	28	–	6	.824
No. 22 Clemson	10	–	6	.625	24	–	10	.706
Virginia Tech	9	–	7	.563	21	–	14	.600
Miami (FL)	8	–	8	.500	23	–	11	.676
Maryland	8	–	8	.500	19	–	15	.559
Georgia Tech	7	–	9	.438	15	–	17	.469
Wake Forest	7	–	9	.438	17	–	13	.567
Florida State	7	–	9	.438	19	–	15	.559
Virginia	5	–	11	.313	17	–	16	.515
Boston College	4	–	12	.250	14	–	17	.452
NC State	4	–	12	.250	15	–	16	.484
† 2008 ACC tournament winner Rankings from AP Poll

The 2007–08 North Carolina Tar Heels men's basketball team represented the University of North Carolina at Chapel Hill during the 2007–08 NCAA Division I men's basketball season. Their head coach was Roy Williams. The team played its home games in the Dean Smith Center in Chapel Hill, North Carolina as a member of the Atlantic Coast Conference.

== Roster ==
2007–08 North Carolina Tar Heels men's basketball team
Players
Coaches

Pos.	#	Name	Height	Weight	Year	Previous school	Hometown
G	2	Marc Campbell	5 ft 11 in (1.8 m)	165 lb (75 kg)	RS So	Ravenscroft	Raleigh, NC
F	40	Mike Copeland	6 ft 7 in (2.01 m)	225 lb (102 kg)	Jr	R. J. Reynolds	Winston-Salem, NC
G	22	Wayne Ellington	6 ft 4 in (1.93 m)	195 lb (88 kg)	So	Episcopal Academy	Wynnewood, PA
G	4	Bobby Frasor	6 ft 3 in (1.91 m)	208 lb (94 kg)	Jr	Brother Rice	Blue Island, IL
G/F	1	Marcus Ginyard	6 ft 5 in (1.96 m)	218 lb (99 kg)	Jr	Bishop O'Connell	Alexandria, VA
F	13	Will Graves	6 ft 6 in (1.98 m)	245 lb (111 kg)	RS Fr	Dudley	Greensboro, NC
G/F	14	Danny Green	6 ft 6 in (1.98 m)	210 lb (95 kg)	Jr	St. Mary's	North Babylon, NY
C	50	Tyler Hansbrough	6 ft 9 in (2.06 m)	245 lb (111 kg)	Jr	Poplar Bluff	Poplar Bluff, MO
G	5	Ty Lawson	5 ft 11 in (1.8 m)	193 lb (88 kg)	So	Oak Hill Academy	Clinton, MD
G	34	Greg Little	6 ft 4 in (1.93 m)	210 lb (95 kg)	Fr	Hillside	Durham, NC
F	35	Patrick Moody	6 ft 4 in (1.93 m)	195 lb (88 kg)	Jr	T. C. Roberson	Arden, NC
F/C	32	Alex Stepheson	6 ft 9 in (2.06 m)	235 lb (107 kg)	So	Harvard-Westlake	Los Angeles, CA
G	15	J. B. Tanner	6 ft 0 in (1.83 m)	185 lb (84 kg)	Jr	West Henderson	Hendersonville, NC
G	11	Quentin Thomas	6 ft 3 in (1.91 m)	185 lb (84 kg)	Sr	Oakland Technical Senior	Oakland, CA
F	21	Deon Thompson	6 ft 8 in (2.03 m)	240 lb (109 kg)	So	Torrance	Torrance, CA
F	24	Surry Wood	6 ft 5 in (1.96 m)	205 lb (93 kg)	Sr	Cary Academy	Raleigh, NC
G	30	Jack Wooten	6 ft 2 in (1.88 m)	190 lb (86 kg)	Jr	Walter Williams	Burlington, NC

Head coach

Roy Williams

Assistant coach(es)

Joe Holladay
Steve Robinson
Jerod Haase

Legend

- (C) Team captain
- (S) Suspended
- (I) Ineligible
- (W) Walk-on
- Injured
- Current redshirt

Roster
Last update: October 29, 2012

- Note: During the December 27 game against Nevada, backup point guard Bobby Frasor was injured, requiring surgery and ending his season.

== Schedule and results ==
The Tar Heels began the season ranked atop both major polls, and stayed there for the first two months of the season despite closer-than-expected games against Davidson and Clemson. They suffered their first loss of the season against Maryland on January 19. Three games later, point guard Ty Lawson twisted his ankle and missed most of February. Despite this, the Tar Heels didn't miss a beat, going 8–1 the rest of the way. They regained the top spot in the polls in late February and held it for the rest of the season. They clinched their 26th ACC regular season title by avenging their earlier loss to Duke in the last game of the season.

In the ACC Tournament held in Charlotte, the top-seeded Tar Heels defeated Florida State, Virginia Tech and Clemson to win their 17th conference tournament title. In so doing, they went into the NCAA Tournament with a 32–2 record—the most wins going into the tourney in school history.

In the NCAA Tournament, the Tar Heels were seeded first in the East Regional, and were also the overall top seed in the tournament. They routed Mount St. Mary's and Arkansas while playing just 30 minutes from campus at the RBC Center in Raleigh. They were no less dominant in the regional phase in Charlotte, scoring convincing wins over Washington State and Louisville to make their 17th trip to the Final Four, but in their national semifinal game, they lost to Kansas, who went on to win the national championship. Remarkably, the Tar Heels made the Final Four while not having to leave the state of North Carolina for a little over a month (a total of 10 games), and while notching two losses at the Smith Center—an arena where they have traditionally been all but unbeatable. They also set a school record for wins in a season, with 36. With Memphis having its 38-win 2007–08 season vacated by the NCAA, the 2007–08 Tar Heels' 36 wins are now the second-most in Division I history.

Date time, TV	Rank^{#}	Opponent^{#}	Result	Record	Site (attendance) city, state
Exhibition
November 3*; 8:15 p.m.	No. 1	Shaw	W 114–62		Dean Smith Center (19,343); Chapel Hill, NC
November 9*; 7:30 p.m.	No. 1	Lenoir-Rhyne	W 107–52		Dean Smith Center (18,357); Chapel Hill, NC
Regular Season
November 14*; 7:00 p.m., ESPN	No. 1	at Davidson	W 72–68	1–0	Charlotte Bobcats Arena (19,299); Charlotte, NC
Las Vegas Invitational
November 18*; 6:00 p.m., ESPNU	No. 1	Iona; Las Vegas Invitational	W 107–72	2–0	Dean Smith Center (18,970); Chapel Hill, NC
November 20*; 7:30 p.m.	No. 1	South Carolina State; Las Vegas Invitational	W 110–64	3–0	Dean Smith Center (18,318); Chapel Hill, NC
November 23*; 11:55 p.m., ESPNU	No. 1	vs. Old Dominion; Las Vegas Invitational	W 99–82	4–0	Orleans Arena (5,500); Las Vegas, NV
November 24*; 10:30 p.m., ESPN	No. 1	vs. Brigham Young; Las Vegas Invitational	W 73–63	5–0	Orleans Arena (5,500); Las Vegas, NV
November 28*; 9:00 p.m., ESPN	No. 1	at Ohio State; ACC–Big Ten Challenge	W 66–55	6–0	Value City Arena (19,049); Columbus, OH
December 1*; 2:00 p.m., ESPN2	No. 1	at Kentucky	W 86–77	7–0	Rupp Arena (24,252); Lexington, KY
December 4*; 7:00 p.m., ESPN2	No. 1	at Penn	W 106–71	8–0	The Palestra (8,722); Philadelphia, PA
December 16*; 8:00 p.m., ESPN	No. 1	at Rutgers	W 93–71	9–0	Louis Brown Athletic Center (8,312); Piscataway, NJ
December 19*; 9:00 p.m., ESPNU	No. 1	Nicholls State	W 88–78	10–0	Dean Smith Center (17,706); Chapel Hill, NC
December 22*; 1:00 p.m., FSN	No. 1	UC Santa Barbara	W 105–70	11–0	Dean Smith Center (20,520); Chapel Hill, NC
December 27*; 7:00 p.m., ESPN2	No. 1	Nevada	W 106–70	12–0	Dean Smith Center (21,750); Chapel Hill, NC
December 30*; 7:30 p.m., FSN	No. 1	Valparaiso	W 90–58	13–0	Dean Smith Center (21,046); Chapel Hill, NC
January 2*; 8:00 p.m., ESPN	No. 1	Kent State	W 90–61	14–0	Dean Smith Center (20,356); Chapel Hill, NC
January 6; 7:30 p.m., FSN	No. 1	at No. 19 Clemson	W 90–88 ^{OT}	15–0 (1–0)	Littlejohn Coliseum (10,000); Clemson, SC
January 9*; 7:00 p.m., ESPNU	No. 1	UNC Asheville	W 93–81	16–0 (1–0)	Dean Smith Center (20,326); Chapel Hill, NC
January 12; 12:00 p.m., ESPN	No. 1	North Carolina State	W 93–62	17–0 (2–0)	Dean Smith Center (21,750); Chapel Hill, NC
January 16; 9:00 p.m., ESPN	No. 1	at Georgia Tech	W 83–82	18–0 (3–0)	Alexander Memorial Coliseum (9,191); Atlanta, GA
January 19; 3:30 p.m., ABC	No. 1	Maryland	L 80–82	18–1 (3–1)	Dean Smith Center (21,033); Chapel Hill, NC
January 23; 9:00 p.m., Raycom	No. 5	at Miami (FL)	W 98–82	19–1 (4–1)	BankUnited Center (7,000); Coral Gables, FL
January 31; 7:00 p.m., ESPN	No. 4	Boston College	W 91–69	20–1 (5–1)	Dean Smith Center (21,247); Chapel Hill, NC
February 3; 2:00 p.m., FSN	No. 4	at Florida State	W 84–73 ^{OT}	21–1 (6–1)	Donald L. Tucker Center (11,066); Tallahassee, FL
February 6; 9:00 p.m., Raycom/ESPN	No. 3	No. 2 Duke	L 78–89	21–2 (6–2)	Dean Smith Center (21,750); Chapel Hill, NC
February 10; 6:30 p.m., FSN	No. 3	Clemson	W 103–93 ^{2OT}	22–2 (7–2)	Dean Smith Center (20,767); Chapel Hill, NC
February 12; 8:00 p.m., Raycom/ESPN2	No. 5	at Virginia	W 75–74	23–2 (8–2)	John Paul Jones Arena (13,765); Charlottesville, VA
February 16; 1:00 p.m., CBS	No. 5	Virginia Tech	W 92–53	24–2 (9–2)	Dean Smith Center (20,890); Chapel Hill, NC
February 20; 7:00 p.m., ESPN	No. 3	at North Carolina State	W 84–70	25–2 (10–2)	RBC Center (19,700); Raleigh, NC
February 24; 6:30 p.m., FSN	No. 3	Wake Forest	W 89–73	26–2 (11–2)	Dean Smith Center (21,004); Chapel Hill, NC
March 1; 3:30 p.m., ABC	No. 3	at Boston College	W 90–80	27–2 (12–2)	Conte Forum (8,606); Chestnut Hill, MA
March 4; 8:00 p.m., Raycom	No. 1	Florida State	W 90–77	28–2 (13–2)	Dean Smith Center (20,520); Chapel Hill, NC
March 8; 9:00 p.m., ESPN	No. 1	at No. 6 Duke; ESPN College GameDay	W 76–68	29–2 (14–2)	Cameron Indoor Stadium (9,314); Durham, NC
ACC tournament
March 14; 12:00 p.m., Raycom/ESPN2	(1) No. 1	vs. (9) Florida State; Quarterfinals	W 82–70	30–2	Charlotte Bobcats Arena (20,035); Charlotte, NC
March 15; 1:30 p.m, Raycom/ESPN	(1) No. 1	vs. (4) Virginia Tech; Semifinals	W 68–66	31–2	Charlotte Bobcats Arena (20,035); Charlotte, NC
March 16; 1:00 p.m., Raycom/ESPN	(1) No. 1	vs. (3) Clemson; Championship	W 86–81	32–2	Charlotte Bobcats Arena (20,035); Charlotte, NC
NCAA tournament
March 21*; 7:10 p.m., CBS	(1 E) No. 1	vs. (16 E) Mount St. Mary's; First Round	W 113–74	33–2	RBC Center (19,477); Raleigh, NC
March 23*; 5:20 p.m., CBS	(1 E) No. 1	vs. (9 E) Arkansas; Second Round	W 108–77	34–2	RBC Center (19,477); Raleigh, NC
March 27*; 7:27 p.m., CBS	(1 E) No. 1	vs. (4 E) No. 21 Washington State; Sweet Sixteen	W 68–47	35–2	Charlotte Bobcats Arena (19,092); Charlotte, NC
March 29*; 9:05 p.m., CBS	(1 E) No. 1	vs. (3 E) No. 13 Louisville; Elite Eight	W 83–73	36–2	Charlotte Bobcats Arena (19,092); Charlotte, NC
April 5*; 8:47 p.m., CBS	(1 E) No. 1	vs. (1 MW) No. 4 Kansas; Final Four	L 66–84	36–3	Alamodome (43,718); San Antonio, TX
*Non-conference game. ^{#}Rankings from AP Poll time zone=Eastern Time. (#) Tournament seedings in parentheses.

== Team players drafted into the NBA ==
Year	Round	Pick	Player	NBA club
2009	1	13	Tyler Hansbrough	Indiana Pacers
2009	1	18	Ty Lawson	Denver Nuggets
2009	1	28	Wayne Ellington	Minnesota Timberwolves
2009	2	46	Danny Green	Cleveland Cavaliers
