= 2007–08 Miami Hurricanes men's basketball team =

American college basketball season

2007–08 Miami Hurricanes men's basketball

Puerto Rico Tip-Off champions

NCAA tournament, second round
- Conference: Atlantic Coast Conference
- Record: 23–11 (8–8 ACC)
- Head coach: Frank Haith (4th season)
- Assistant coaches: Jorge Fernandez; Jake Morton; Michael Schwartz
- Home arena: BankUnited Center

2007–08 ACC men's basketball standings
	Conf.				Overall
Team	W		L	PCT	W		L	PCT
No. 1 North Carolina †	14	–	2	.875	36	–	3	.923
No. 9 Duke	13	–	3	.813	28	–	6	.824
No. 22 Clemson	10	–	6	.625	24	–	10	.706
Virginia Tech	9	–	7	.563	21	–	14	.600
Miami (FL)	8	–	8	.500	23	–	11	.676
Maryland	8	–	8	.500	19	–	15	.559
Georgia Tech	7	–	9	.438	15	–	17	.469
Wake Forest	7	–	9	.438	17	–	13	.567
Florida State	7	–	9	.438	19	–	15	.559
Virginia	5	–	11	.313	17	–	16	.515
Boston College	4	–	12	.250	14	–	17	.452
NC State	4	–	12	.250	15	–	16	.484
† 2008 ACC tournament winner Rankings from AP Poll

The 2007–08 Miami Hurricanes men's basketball team represented the University of Miami during the 2007–08 NCAA Division I men's basketball season. The Hurricanes, led by 4th-year head coach Frank Haith, played their home games at the BankUnited Center and were members of the Atlantic Coast Conference. They finished the season 23–11, 8–8 in ACC play to finish in a three-way tie for fourth place. They lost in the quarterfinals of the ACC Basketball tournament to Florida State. They were invited to the 2008 NCAA tournament as the No. 7 seed in the South region. They defeated St. Mary's in the first round before falling in the second round to Texas.

== Roster ==
2007–08 Miami Hurricanes men's basketball team
Players
Coaches

Pos.	#	Name	Height	Weight	Year	Hometown
F	00	Jimmy Graham	6 ft 8 in (2.03 m)	251 lb (114 kg)	Jr	Goldsboro, NC
G	1	Lance Hurdle	6 ft 2 in (1.88 m)	180 lb (82 kg)	Jr	San Diego, CA
G	5	Eddie Rios	6 ft 0 in (1.83 m)	193 lb (88 kg)	Fr	Miami, FL
G	10	Landon Glover (W)	6 ft 2 in (1.88 m)	185 lb (84 kg)	Sr	Montclair, NJ
F	20	Cyrus McGowan	6 ft 9 in (2.06 m)	232 lb (105 kg)	Jr	Brooksville, MS
F	21	Dwayne Collins	6 ft 8 in (2.03 m)	235 lb (107 kg)	So	Miami, FL
F	22	Fabio Nass	6 ft 11 in (2.11 m)	210 lb (95 kg)	Sr	Santa Catarina, Brazil
G	23	James Dews	6 ft 3 in (1.91 m)	203 lb (92 kg)	So	West Chester, OH
G	25	Jonathan Stratton (W)	6 ft 3 in (1.91 m)	185 lb (84 kg)	Sr	Sandusky, OH
F	30	Adrian Thomas	6 ft 7 in (2.01 m)	222 lb (101 kg)	RS So	Pembroke Pines, FL
F	32	Brian Asbury	6 ft 7 in (2.01 m)	223 lb (101 kg)	Jr	Miami, FL
G	33	Jack McClinton	6 ft 1 in (1.85 m)	185 lb (84 kg)	Jr	Baltimore, MD
F	42	Raymond Hicks	6 ft 7 in (2.01 m)	238 lb (108 kg)	Sr	Longview, TX
C	45	Julian Gamble	6 ft 9 in (2.06 m)	258 lb (117 kg)	Fr	Durham, NC
C	50	Anthony King	6 ft 9 in (2.06 m)	246 lb (112 kg)	RS Sr	Durham, NC

Head coach

- Frank Haith (Elon)

Assistant coach(es)

- Jorge Fernandez (Stetson)
- Jake Morton (Miami (FL))
- Michael Schwartz (Texas)

Legend

- (C) Team captain
- (S) Suspended
- (I) Ineligible
- (W) Walk-on
- Injured
- Current redshirt

Roster

== Schedule ==
Date time, TV	Rank^{#}	Opponent^{#}	Result	Record	High points	High rebounds	High assists	Site (attendance) city, state
Non-conference regular season
Nov 9, 2007*; 7:30 pm		Florida Southern	W 104–61	1–0	15 – Tied	11 – Graham	7 – McClinton	BankUnited Center (2,367); Coral Gables, FL
Nov 15, 2007*; 12:30 pm		vs. Marist; Puerto Rico Tip-Off First Round	W 85–61	2–0	13 – King	5 – Tied	8 – Rios	José Miguel Agrelot Coliseum (1,567); San Juan, PR
Nov 16, 2007*; 2:30 pm		vs. VCU; Puerto Rico Tip-Off Semifinals	W 69–63	3–0	23 – McClinton	15 – King	2 – Graham	José Miguel Agrelot Coliseum (1,818); San Juan, PR
Nov 18, 2007*; 8:30 pm		vs. Providence; Puerto Rico Tip-Off Championship	W 64–58	4–0	17 – Dews	8 – King	4 – Tied	José Miguel Agrelot Coliseum (5,078); San Juan, PR
Nov 24, 2007*; 1:00 pm		Morgan State	W 55–51	5–0	11 – King	8 – King	4 – Rios	BankUnited Center (1,777); Coral Gables, FL
Nov 28, 2007*; 7:30 pm		Alabama State	W 83–74	6–0	16 – Collins	12 – King	5 – Rios	BankUnited Center (2,339); Coral Gables, FL
Dec 2, 2007*; 4:00 pm		St. John's	W 66–47	7–0	13 – Tied	8 – King	4 – Hurdle	BankUnited Center (3,515); Coral Gables, FL
Dec 8, 2007*; 7:00 pm		at Florida International	W 67–53	8–0	14 – Tied	9 – Tied	4 – McClinton	Pharmed Arena (4,121); Miami, FL
Dec 13, 2007*; 7:00 pm		at Mississippi State	W 64–58	9–0	29 – McClinton	7 – Tied	2 – Tied	Humphrey Coliseum (7,912); Starkville, MS
Dec 17, 2007*; 9:00 pm	No. 22	Stetson	W 89–53	10–0	18 – Asbury	9 – Asbury	5 – Tied	BankUnited Center (1,893); Coral Gables, FL
Dec 20, 2007*; 7:30 pm	No. 22	North Florida	W 85–63	11–0	13 – Tied	11 – Collins	6 – McClinton	BankUnited Center (2,253); Coral Gables, FL
Dec 23, 2007*; 1:00 pm	No. 22	North Carolina A&T	W 95–64	12–0	17 – McClinton	7 – Tied	8 – Asbury	BankUnited Center (2,755); Coral Gables, FL
Dec 29, 2007*; 4:00 pm	No. 19	vs. Winthrop; Orange Bowl Basketball Classic	L 70–76	12–1	30 – McClinton	9 – King	4 – McClinton	Bank Atlantic Center (13,153); Sunrise, FL
Jan 2, 2008*; 8:00 pm		Penn	W 88–62	13–1	22 – Asbury	12 – Collins	6 – Dews	BankUnited Center (3,138); Coral Gables, FL
ACC regular season
Jan 12, 2008; 2:00 pm	No. 25	Georgia Tech	W 78–68	14–1 (1–0)	20 – Dews	8 – King	2 – Tied	BankUnited Center (7,000); Coral Gables, FL
Jan 15, 2008; 9:00 pm	No. 21	at Boston College	L 66–76	14–2 (1–1)	20 – McClinton	8 – Collins	3 – McClinton	Conte Forum (5,127); Boston, MA
Jan 19, 2008; 8:00 pm	No. 21	at NC State	L 77–79 ^{OT}	14–3 (1–2)	26 – McClinton	9 – Graham	3 – Dews	RBC Center (12,400); Raleigh, NC
Jan 23, 2008; 9:00 pm		No. 5 North Carolina	L 82–98	14–4 (1–3)	20 – Hurdle	7 – King	7 – McClinton	BankUnited Center (7,000); Coral Gables, FL
Jan 27, 2008; 1:00 pm		Clemson	W 75–72	15–4 (2–3)	16 – Collins	12 – Collins	3 – McClinton	BankUnited Center (4,859); Coral Gables, FL
Jan 29, 2008; 7:00 pm		at Wake Forest	L 68–70	15–5 (2–4)	16 – McClinton	7 – King	6 – Hurdle	LJVM Coliseum (12,417); Winston-Salem, NC
Feb 2, 2008; 3:45 pm		at No. 3 Duke	L 73–88	15–6 (2–5)	15 – Dews	7 – Tied	3 – Hurdle	Cameron Indoor Stadium (9,314); Durham, NC
Feb 6, 2008; 7:30 pm		Florida State	L 55–62	15–7 (2–6)	16 – McClinton	12 – Graham	5 – Hurdle	BankUnited Center (5,447); Coral Gables, FL
Feb 9, 2008; 2:00 pm		at Virginia Tech	W 74–71	16–7 (3–6)	19 – McClinton	11 – King	2 – Hurdle	Cassell Coliseum (9,847); Blacksburg, VA
Feb 17, 2008; 1:00 pm		at Georgia Tech	W 64–63	17–7 (4–6)	23 – McClinton	7 – Collins	2 – Tied	Alexander Memorial Coliseum (9,191); Atlanta, GA
Feb 20, 2008; 9:00 pm		No. 5 Duke	W 96–95	18–7 (5–6)	26 – Collins	7 – Collins	4 – Tied	BankUnited Center (6,670); Coral Gables, FL
Feb 23, 2008; 2:00 pm		Maryland	W 78–63	19–7 (6–6)	14 – King	6 – Collins	3 – Hurdle	BankUnited Center (6,058); Coral Gables, FL
Feb 27, 2008; 7:30 pm		at Clemson	L 69–79	19–8 (6–7)	18 – McClinton	10 – Collins	6 – Rios	Littlejohn Coliseum (9,347); Clemson, SC
Mar 1, 2008; 2:30 pm		Virginia	W 95–93	20–8 (7–7)	34 – McClinton	8 – King	8 – Rios	BankUnited Center (6,128); Coral Gables, FL
Mar 5, 2008; 7:00 pm		Boston College	W 74–61	21–8 (8–7)	21 – McClinton	8 – King	2 – Tied	BankUnited Center (5,953); Coral Gables, FL
Mar 8, 2008; 12:00 pm		at Florida State	L 72–75 ^{OT}	21–9 (8–8)	22 – McClinton	10 – Collins	5 – Dews	Tallahassee-Leon County Civic Center (6,780); Tallahassee, FL
ACC tournament
Mar 13, 2008*; 2:30 pm	(5)	vs. (12) NC State; First Round	W 63–50	22–9	14 – Dews	6 – Tied	5 – Hurdle	Charlotte Bobcats Arena (20,035); Charlotte, NC
Mar 14, 2008*; 2:30 pm	(5)	vs. (4) Virginia Tech; Quarterfinals	L 49–63	22–10	16 – McClinton	5 – Tied	4 – McClinton	Charlotte Bobcats Arena (20,035); Charlotte, NC
NCAA tournament
Mar 21, 2008*; 11:30 am	(7 S)	vs. (10 S) Saint Mary's; First Round	W 78–64	23–10	38 – McClinton	9 – Collins	3 – Tied	Alltel Arena (16,060); North Little Rock, AR
Mar 23, 2008*; 1:15 pm	(7 S)	vs. (2 S) No. 7 Texas; Second Round	L 72–75	23–11	18 – McClinton	6 – King	3 – Tied	Alltel Arena (16,060); North Little Rock, AR
*Non-conference game. ^{#}Rankings from AP Poll. (#) Tournament seedings in parentheses. All times are in Eastern Time.
