= 2007–08 Boston College Eagles men's basketball team =

American college basketball season

2007–08 Boston College Eagles men's basketball
- Conference: Atlantic Coast Conference
- Record: 14–17 (4–12 ACC)
- Head coach: Al Skinner (11th season)
- Assistant coaches: Pat Duquette (11th season); Bonzie Colson; Mo Cassara
- Home arena: Conte Forum

2007–08 ACC men's basketball standings
	Conf.				Overall
Team	W		L	PCT	W		L	PCT
No. 1 North Carolina †	14	–	2	.875	36	–	3	.923
No. 9 Duke	13	–	3	.813	28	–	6	.824
No. 22 Clemson	10	–	6	.625	24	–	10	.706
Virginia Tech	9	–	7	.563	21	–	14	.600
Miami (FL)	8	–	8	.500	23	–	11	.676
Maryland	8	–	8	.500	19	–	15	.559
Georgia Tech	7	–	9	.438	15	–	17	.469
Wake Forest	7	–	9	.438	17	–	13	.567
Florida State	7	–	9	.438	19	–	15	.559
Virginia	5	–	11	.313	17	–	16	.515
Boston College	4	–	12	.250	14	–	17	.452
NC State	4	–	12	.250	15	–	16	.484
† 2008 ACC tournament winner Rankings from AP Poll

The 2007–08 Boston College Eagles men's basketball team represented college basketball for Boston College during the 2007–08 NCAA Division I men's basketball season. The Eagles were led by eleventh-year head coach Al Skinner, played their home games at the Conte Forum, and were members of the Atlantic Coast Conference.

== Roster ==
Name	Number	Pos.	Height	Weight	Year	Hometown	High School
Tyrese Rice	4	G	6–1	190	Junior	Richmond, Virginia	L.C. Bird
Biko Paris	5	G	6–1	200	Freshman	New Orleans, Louisiana	Cypress Christian (TX)
Brennan Bennett	10	G	6–0	185	Sophomore	Whitinsville, Massachusetts	Northbridge
Corey Raji	11	F	6–6	218	Freshman	Township of Washington, Bergen County, New Jersey	Westwood
Joe Trapani	12	F	6–8	215	Sophomore	Madison, Connecticut	Daniel Hand
Daye Kaba	13	G	6–4	214	Sophomore	Ridge, New York	Our Savior New American
Rakim Sanders	15	G-F	6–5	228	Freshman	Pawtucket, Rhode Island	St. Andrew's
Tyler Roche	21	F	6–7	200	Sophomore	Hooksett, New Hampshire	Manchester Central
John Oates	32	F	6–10	255	Senior	Harriman, New York	Don Bosco Prep
Shamari Spears	34	F	6–6	238	Sophomore	Salisbury, North Carolina	Blair (NJ)
Tyrelle Blair	44	C	6–11	242	Senior	Monticello, Florida	FSU High School
Josh Southern	52	C	6–10	255	Freshman	Saginaw, Michigan	Saginaw
Cortney Dunn	55	F	6–8	215	Freshman	Dallas, Texas	Lake Highlands

== Schedule and results ==
Date time, TV	Rank^{#}	Opponent^{#}	Result	Record	Site city, state
Sun, Nov 4*; 2:00 p.m.		Carleton; Exhibition	W 70–47		Conte Forum; Chestnut Hill, MA
Regular Season
Sat, Nov 10*; 4:00 p.m.		New Hampshire	W 67–57	1–0	Conte Forum; Chestnut Hill, MA
Mon, Nov 12*; 7:00 p.m.		Florida Atlantic	W 68–62	2–0	Conte Forum; Chestnut Hill, MA
Sun, Nov 18*; 2:00 p.m.		Mercer	W 73–56	3–0	Conte Forum; Chestnut Hill, MA
Wed, Nov 21*; 4:00 p.m.		Rhode Island	W 76–72	4–0	Conte Forum; Chestnut Hill, MA
Wed, Nov 28*; 7:00 p.m., ESPNU		Michigan; ACC-Big Ten Challenge	W 77–64	5–0	Crisler Arena; Ann Arbor, MI
Sat, Dec 01*; 6:00 p.m., ESPN Classic		vs. Providence; Hall of Fame Classic	L 89–98 ^{OT}	5–1	T.D. Banknorth Garden; Boston
Tue, Dec 04*; 7:00 p.m.		St. Louis	W 61–39	6–1	Conte Forum; Chestnut Hill, MA
Sun, Dec 09; 7:30 p.m., FSN		at Maryland	W 81–78	7–1 (1–0)	Comcast Center; College Park, MD
Wed, Dec 12*; 9:00 p.m., ESPNU		Massachusetts	L 80–83	7–2	Conte Forum; Chestnut Hill, MA
Sat, Dec 22*; 4:00 p.m.		Northeastern	W 57–55	8–2	Conte Forum; Chestnut Hill, MA
Fri, Dec 28*; 7:00 p.m.		Sacred Heart	W 80–75	9–2	Conte Forum; Chestnut Hill, MA
Wed, Jan 02*; 7:00 p.m.		Longwood	W 81–52	10–2	Conte Forum; Chestnut Hill, MA
Sat, Jan 05*; 12:00 p.m., ESPN		No. 4 Kansas	L 60–85	10–3	Conte Forum; Chestnut Hill, MA
Mon, Jan 07*; 7:00 p.m.		Robert Morris	L 51–57	10–4	Conte Forum; Chestnut Hill, MA
Sat, Jan 12; 4:00 p.m.		Wake Forest	W 112–73	11–4 (2–0)	Conte Forum; Chestnut Hill, MA
Tue, Jan 15; 9:00 p.m.		Miami (FL)	W 76–66	12–4 (3–0)	Conte Forum; Chestnut Hill, MA
Sat, Jan 19; 2:00 p.m.		at Virginia	L 66–84	12–5 (3–1)	John Paul Jones Arena; Charlottesville, VA
Sat, Jan 26; 4:00 p.m.		Virginia Tech	L 73–81	12–6 (3–2)	Conte Forum; Chestnut Hill, MA
Thur, Jan 31; 7:00 p.m., ESPN		at No. 1 North Carolina	L 69–91	12–7 (3–3)	Dean Smith Center; Chapel Hill, NC
Sat, Feb 02; 8:00 p.m.		Clemson	L 56–78	12–8 (3–4)	Littlejohn Coliseum; Clemson, SC
Wed, Feb 06; 7:00 p.m., ESPNU		Maryland	L 65–70	12–9 (3–5)	Conte Forum; Chestnut Hill, MA
Sat, Feb 09; 1:00 p.m., CBS		at No. 9 Duke	L 80–90	12–10 (3–6)	Cameron Indoor Stadium; Durham, NC
Thur, Feb 14; 7:00 p.m., ESPN2		NC State	W 82–65	13–10 (4–6)	Conte Forum; Chestnut Hill, MA
Sun, Feb 17; 1:00 p.m.		Virginia	L 74–79	13–11 (4–7)	Conte Forum; Chestnut Hill, MA
Sat, Feb 23; 12:00 p.m.		at Florida State	L 63–66	13–12 (4–8)	Donald L. Tucker Center; Tallahassee, FL
Tue, Feb 26; 7:00 p.m., ESPNU		at Virginia Tech	L 48–67	13–13 (4–9)	Cassell Coliseum; Blacksburg, VA
Sat, Mar 01; 3:30 p.m., ABC		No. 1 North Carolina	L 80–90	13–14 (4–10)	Conte Forum; Chestnut Hill, MA
Wed, Mar 05; 7:00 p.m., ESPNU		at Miami (FL)	L 61–74	13–15 (4–11)	BankUnited Center; Coral Gables, FL
Sat, Mar 08; 3:30 p.m., ABC		Georgia Tech	L 78–86	13–16 (4–12)	Conte Forum; Chestnut Hill, MA
ACC Tournament
Thur, Mar 13; 9:30 p.m., Raycom Sports		vs. Maryland	W 71–68	14–16	Time Warner Cable Arena; Charlotte, NC
Fri, Mar 14; 9:30 p.m., Raycom Sports		vs. No. 22 Clemson	L 48–82	14–17	Time Warner Cable Arena; Charlotte, NC
*Non-conference game. ^{#}Rankings from Coaches' Poll. (#) Tournament seedings in parentheses. All times are in Eastern Time.
