= James Johnson (basketball, born 1987) =

American basketball player (born 1987)

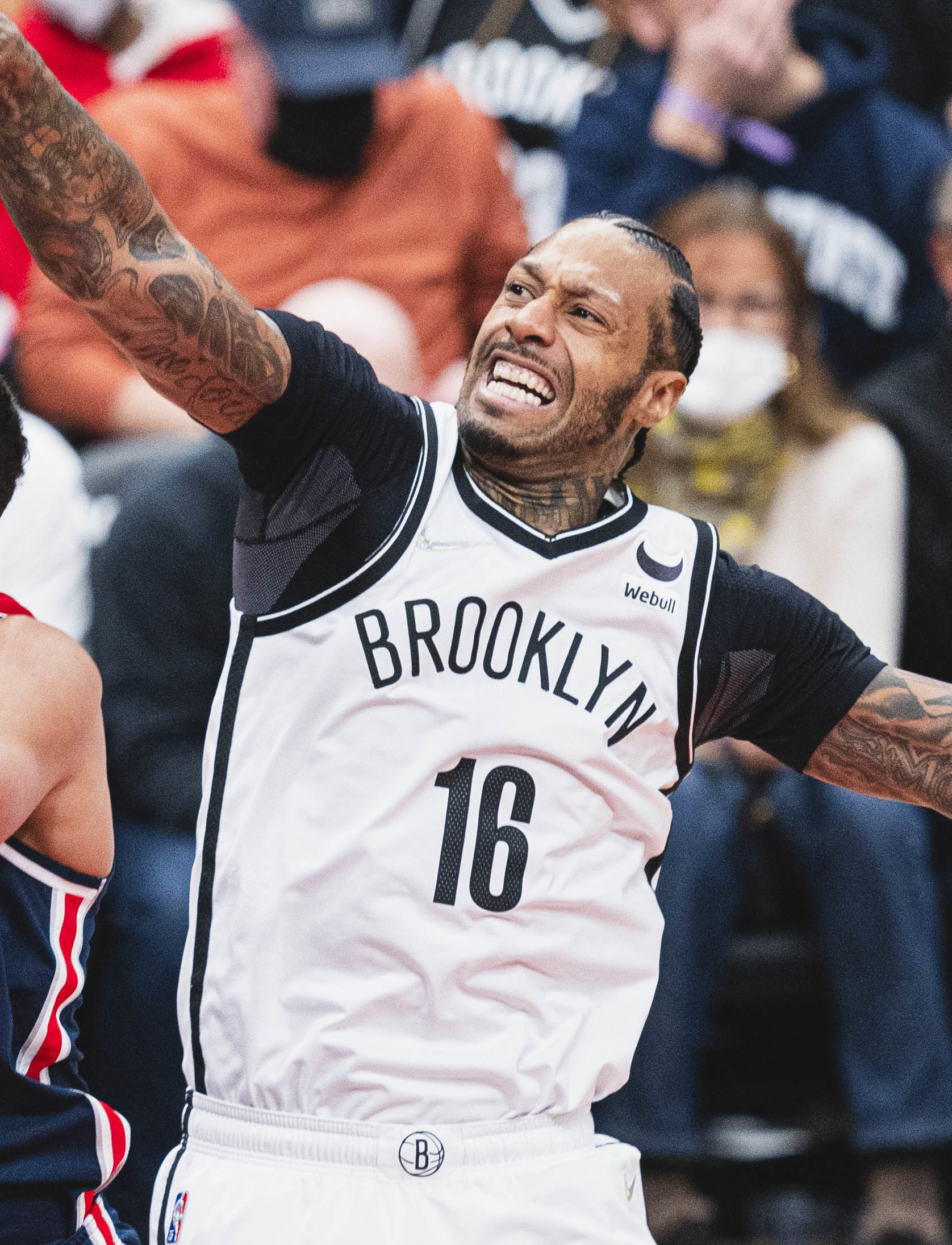
- Johnson with the Brooklyn Nets in 2022

Free agent
- Position: Power forward / small forward

Personal information
- Born: February 20, 1987 (age 39) Cheyenne, Wyoming, U.S.
- Listed height: 6 ft 8 in (2.03 m)
- Listed weight: 240 lb (109 kg)

Career information
- High school: Cheyenne East (Cheyenne, Wyoming)
- College: Wake Forest (2007–2009)
- NBA draft: 2009: 1st round, 16th overall pick
- Drafted by: Chicago Bulls
- Playing career: 2009–present

Career history
- 2009–2011: Chicago Bulls
- 2011: →Iowa Energy
- 2011–2012: Toronto Raptors
- 2012–2013: Sacramento Kings
- 2013: Rio Grande Valley Vipers
- 2013–2014: Memphis Grizzlies
- 2014–2016: Toronto Raptors
- 2016–2020: Miami Heat
- 2020: Minnesota Timberwolves
- 2020–2021: Dallas Mavericks
- 2021: New Orleans Pelicans
- 2021–2022: Brooklyn Nets
- 2022–2025: Indiana Pacers

Career highlights
- 2× Third-team All-ACC (2008, 2009); ACC All-Freshman team (2008)
- Stats at NBA.com
- Stats at Basketball Reference

James Patrick Johnson (born February 20, 1987) is an American professional basketball player who last played for the Indiana Pacers of the National Basketball Association (NBA). He was the starting power forward for the Wake Forest Demon Deacons from 2007 to 2009. He was drafted 16th overall in the 2009 NBA draft by the Chicago Bulls.

== High school career ==
Johnson attended Cheyenne East High School in Cheyenne, Wyoming. During his senior year, he averaged 28 points and nine rebounds per game. Johnson and his brother, Scott, were both wide receivers on the football team as well.

Considered a four-star recruit by Rivals.com, Johnson was listed as the No. 16 small forward and the No. 62 player in the nation in 2007.

== College career ==
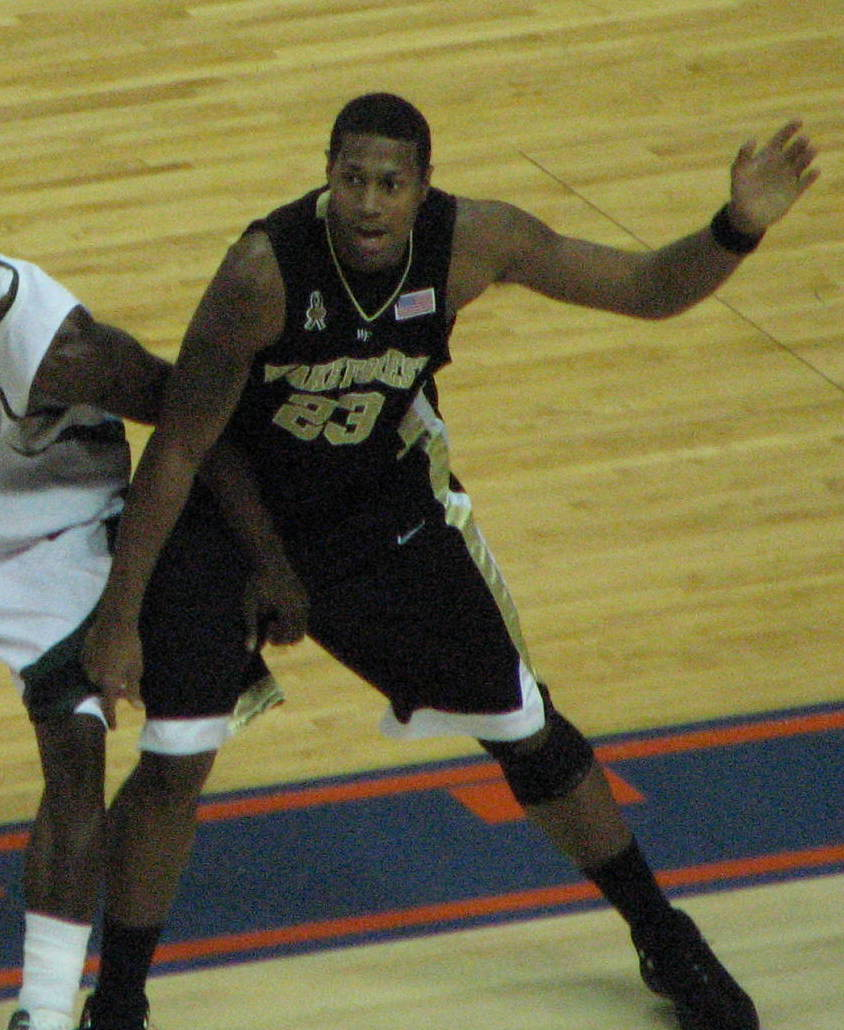
Johnson with Wake Forest in 2007

As a freshman at Wake Forest in 2007–08, Johnson had an instant impact, garnering third-team All-ACC honors as a freshman and finishing second in the 2008 ACC Rookie of the Year balloting, as he led the Demon Deacons in scoring and rebounding.

As a sophomore, Johnson again led the team in rebounding, leading the team to a 24–5 record and a #1 ranking during the 2008–09 season. He was again named third team All-ACC. Following the season, Johnson declared his eligibility for the 2009 NBA draft.

== Professional career ==
=== Chicago Bulls (2009–2011) ===
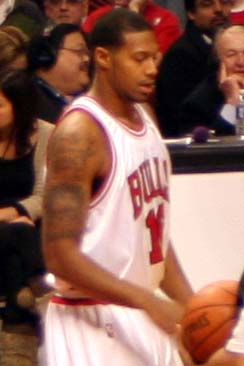
Johnson with the Chicago Bulls in 2009

Johnson was drafted 16th overall by the Chicago Bulls in the 2009 NBA draft. On July 8, 2009, he signed his first professional contract with the Bulls. On January 27, 2011, Johnson was assigned to the Iowa Energy of the NBA D-League. On February 14, 2011, he was recalled by the Bulls.

=== Toronto Raptors (2011–2012) ===
On February 22, 2011, Johnson was traded to the Toronto Raptors in exchange for the 2011 first-round pick that they had acquired from the Miami Heat.

=== Sacramento Kings (2012–2013) ===
On July 16, 2012, Johnson was traded to the Sacramento Kings in exchange for a 2014 second-round draft pick. On December 28, Johnson hit a game-winning three-pointer at the buzzer which gave the Kings a 106–105 victory over the New York Knicks.

=== Rio Grande Valley Vipers (2013) ===
On September 30, 2013, Johnson signed with the Atlanta Hawks. He was waived on October 21.

In November 2013, Johnson was acquired by the Rio Grande Valley Vipers. In 10 games with the Vipers, he averaged 18.5 points, 9.1 rebounds, 4.8 assists, 1.9 steals, and 3.4 blocks per game.

=== Memphis Grizzlies (2013–2014) ===
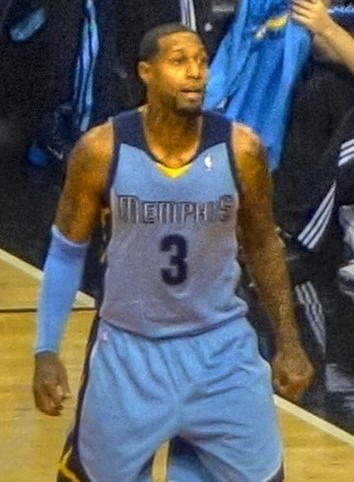
Johnson with the Memphis Grizzlies in 2014

On December 16, 2013, Johnson signed with the Memphis Grizzlies.

=== Return to Toronto (2014–2016) ===
On July 17, 2014, Johnson signed with the Toronto Raptors, returning for a second stint.

On December 19, 2014, in Detroit, after Johnson's dunk on Andre Drummond made it 95–75 midway through the fourth, on Toronto's next possession, Drummond smashed into Johnson with a forearm and hip smash. This set off a melee that saw Drummond get a flagrant foul and four technicals called. Following the game, Johnson said "That was nasty, but that's basketball. I don't expect anything less from anybody that's trying to win. Frustration sets in when you want to win—no hard feelings." When asked to comment on the dunk itself, Johnson remarked, "That was nasty, right? I cocked that joint back and banged on him!" Johnson's quote, combined with the dunk, garnered social media buzz by Raptor fans, gaining popularity as a catchphrase associated with him to the point that it was printed on T-shirts and sold online for a charitable campaign.

On February 21, 2015, Johnson scored a career-high 27 points in a 76–98 loss to the Houston Rockets.

=== Miami Heat (2016–2020) ===
On July 10, 2016, Johnson signed a one-year, $4 million contract with the Miami Heat. He made his debut for the Heat in their season opener on October 26, 2016, recording 11 points and six assists off the bench in a 108–96 win over Orlando Magic. On February 10, 2017, he scored a season-high 26 points in a 108–99 win over the Brooklyn Nets, helping the Heat record their 13th straight win. On April 5, 2017, he went 6 of 7 from three-point range and had 26 points in a 112–99 win over the Charlotte Hornets.

On July 7, 2017, Johnson re-signed with the Heat on a 4-year, $60 million contract. On January 10, 2018, he was suspended for one game without pay for an altercation with Serge Ibaka during a game against the Toronto Raptors a day earlier. On March 19, 2018, he scored a career-high 31 points in a 149–141 double-overtime win over the Denver Nuggets.

Johnson missed the first month of the 2018–19 season following off-season sports hernia surgery.

=== Minnesota Timberwolves (2020) ===
On February 6, 2020, Johnson was traded to the Minnesota Timberwolves in a three-team trade.

=== Dallas Mavericks (2020–2021) ===
On November 20, 2020, Johnson was traded, alongside the draft rights to Aleksej Pokuševski and Minnesota's 2024 second-round pick, to the Oklahoma City Thunder in exchange for Ricky Rubio and the draft rights to Jaden McDaniels and Immanuel Quickley. On November 27, Johnson was traded to the Dallas Mavericks in a three-team trade involving the Detroit Pistons.

=== New Orleans Pelicans (2021) ===
On March 26, 2021, Johnson was traded, alongside Wes Iwundu and a second-round draft pick, to the New Orleans Pelicans in exchange for JJ Redick and Nicolò Melli.

=== Brooklyn Nets (2021–2022) ===
On August 6, 2021, Johnson signed a one-year contract with the Brooklyn Nets. On March 1, 2022, he logged a season-high 19 points, alongside three assists, in a 108–109 loss to the Toronto Raptors. On April 7, Johnson was waived by the Nets.

=== Indiana Pacers (2022–2025) ===
On September 16, 2022, Johnson signed with the Indiana Pacers, reuniting him with former head coach Rick Carlisle. On February 9, 2023, he was waived alongside Goga Bitadze to make room for new trade–deadline acquisitions Jordan Nwora, George Hill, and Serge Ibaka. Four days later, he re-signed with the Pacers for the remainder of the season following the release of Ibaka.

On December 15, 2023, Johnson re-signed with the Indiana Pacers. After playing only five games, Johnson was waived on January 17, 2024, to complete a trade for Pascal Siakam. Two days later, he signed a 10 day contract with the Pacers and on January 29, he signed a second one. On February 8, Johnson signed with the Pacers for the rest of the season.

On July 25, 2024, Johnson re-signed with the Pacers. In Game 6 of the 2025 NBA Finals against the Oklahoma City Thunder, Johnson came off the bench for two minutes before being called on a hard shove and getting ejected with under a minute on the clock.

On September 22, 2026, Johnson signed a non–guaranteed, training camp contract with Indiana.

== Career statistics ==
Legend
GP	Games played	GS	Games started	MPG	Minutes per game
FG%	Field goal percentage	3P%	3-point field goal percentage	FT%	Free throw percentage
RPG	Rebounds per game	APG	Assists per game	SPG	Steals per game
BPG	Blocks per game	PPG	Points per game	**Bold**	Career high

=== NBA ===
==== Regular season ====
Year	Team	GP	GS	MPG	FG%	3P%	FT%	RPG	APG	SPG	BPG	PPG
2009–10	Chicago	65	11	11.6	.452	.326	.729	2.0	.7	.3	.7	3.9
2010–11	Chicago	13	0	9.4	.415	.222	.462	1.8	1.1	.6	.7	3.2
2010–11	Toronto	25	25	**27.9**	.464	.240	.707	4.7	3.0	1.0	1.1	9.2
2011–12	Toronto	62	40	25.2	.450	.317	.704	4.7	2.0	1.1	**1.4**	9.1
2012–13	Sacramento	54	11	16.3	.413	.095	.597	2.7	1.1	.8	.9	5.1
2013–14	Memphis	52	4	18.4	.464	.253	.844	3.2	2.1	.8	1.1	7.4
2014–15	Toronto	70	17	19.6	**.589**	.216	.657	3.7	1.4	.8	1.0	7.9
2015–16	Toronto	57	32	16.2	.475	.303	.574	2.2	1.2	.5	.6	5.0
2016–17	Miami	**76**	5	27.4	.479	.341	.707	**4.9**	3.6	1.0	1.1	**12.8**
2017–18	Miami	73	**41**	26.6	.503	.308	.698	**4.9**	**3.8**	1.0	.7	10.8
2018–19	Miami	55	33	21.2	.433	.336	.714	3.2	2.5	.6	.5	7.8
2019–20	Miami	18	0	15.6	.448	.356	.571	2.9	1.2	.3	.7	5.7
2019–20	Minnesota	14	1	24.2	.500	**.370**	.676	4.7	**3.8**	**1.4**	**1.4**	12.0
2020–21	Dallas	29	1	17.4	.462	.250	.586	3.0	1.7	.8	.8	5.7
2020–21	New Orleans	22	11	24.5	.434	.267	.596	4.1	2.2	.8	.9	9.2
2021–22	Brooklyn	62	10	19.2	.469	.271	.527	3.5	2.1	.5	.5	5.5
2022–23	Indiana	18	1	9.0	.449	.200	.500	1.7	.8	.4	.3	2.8
2023–24	Indiana	9	0	5.2	.300	.000	**1.000**	.4	.9	.6	.1	.9
2024–25	Indiana	12	0	3.1	.364	.000	.000	.5	.3	.0	.2	.7
Career		786	243	19.8	.473	.300	.678	3.5	2.0	.7	.8	7.4

==== Playoffs ====
Year	Team	GP	GS	MPG	FG%	3P%	FT%	RPG	APG	SPG	BPG	PPG
2010	Chicago	4	0	5.0	.000	.000	—	.3	.3	.0	.0	.0
2014	Memphis	3	0	9.3	.333	.400	**.700**	2.0	.0	.3	.0	6.3
2015	Toronto	2	0	6.0	.333	—	.000	1.0	.5	.0	.0	2.0
2016	Toronto	**10**	0	9.8	.480	.444	.667	1.5	.6	.3	.0	3.0
2018	Miami	5	**5**	**32.1**	.548	**.538**	.643	**6.0**	**4.8**	**1.2**	**1.2**	**12.4**
2024	Indiana	1	0	1.0	—	—	.500	.0	.0	.0	.0	1.0
2025	Indiana	5	0	3.6	**.600**	.000	.500	.2	.4	.4	.4	1.4
Career		30	5	11.3	.474	.448	.541	1.8	1.1	.4	.3	4.1

=== College ===
Year	Team	GP	GS	MPG	FG%	3P%	FT%	RPG	APG	SPG	BPG	PPG
2007–08	Wake Forest	30	28	29.2	.487	.280	.689	8.1	1.2	**1.4**	1.3	14.6
2008–09	Wake Forest	**31**	**31**	**30.5**	**.542**	**.319**	**.697**	**8.5**	**2.0**	**1.4**	**1.5**	**15.0**
Career		61	59	29.9	.515	.296	.693	8.3	1.6	1.4	1.4	14.8

== Personal life ==
Johnson is of African-American and Samoan heritage. He is a black belt in karate. Johnson also claims a kickboxing record of 20–0 and to have also fought in MMA; however, neither of these claims has been corroborated.

Johnson has a tattoo of his son's name, "Naymin", inscribed around his front neck.

Johnson was arrested for domestic assault on June 7, 2014, after allegedly hitting and choking his wife, Callie, at their home. On June 30, 2014, the domestic assault case against Johnson was dismissed after his wife failed to appear in court. The couple later divorced, with Callie gaining custody of their son.
