= 2007–08 Wake Forest Demon Deacons men's basketball team =

American college basketball season

2007–08 Wake Forest Demon Deacons men's basketball
- Conference: Atlantic Coast Conference
- Record: 17–13 (7–9 ACC)
- Head coach: Dino Gaudio
- Assistant coaches: Jeff Battle; Pat Kelsey; Mike Muse
- Home arena: LJVM Coliseum

2007–08 ACC men's basketball standings
	Conf.				Overall
Team	W		L	PCT	W		L	PCT
No. 1 North Carolina †	14	–	2	.875	36	–	3	.923
No. 9 Duke	13	–	3	.813	28	–	6	.824
No. 22 Clemson	10	–	6	.625	24	–	10	.706
Virginia Tech	9	–	7	.563	21	–	14	.600
Miami (FL)	8	–	8	.500	23	–	11	.676
Maryland	8	–	8	.500	19	–	15	.559
Georgia Tech	7	–	9	.438	15	–	17	.469
Wake Forest	7	–	9	.438	17	–	13	.567
Florida State	7	–	9	.438	19	–	15	.559
Virginia	5	–	11	.313	17	–	16	.515
Boston College	4	–	12	.250	14	–	17	.452
NC State	4	–	12	.250	15	–	16	.484
† 2008 ACC tournament winner Rankings from AP Poll

The 2007–08 Wake Forest Demon Deacons men's basketball team represented Wake Forest University in the 2007–08 NCAA Division I men's basketball season. The Demon Deacons, led by first-year head coach Dino Gaudio, played their games at Lawrence Joel Veterans Memorial Coliseum, and were members of the Atlantic Coast Conference.

In first season under their new head coach (who replaced former coach Skip Prosser, who died in the off-season), the Deacons lost leading scorer from 2006 to 2007, Kyle Visser, but brought in a good recruiting class (ranked 28th nationally by Scout.com), including guards Jeff Teague and Gary Clark, and forward James Johnson.

== Roster ==
#	Name	Position	Height	Class	Hometown
2	Gary Clark	G	6'4"	Freshman	Sarasota, Florida
35	Kyle Fowler	G	6'2"	Freshman	Wheaton, Illinois
4	Harvey Hale	G	6'2"	Junior	Albuquerque, New Mexico
52	Bobby Hoekstra	F	6'7"	Junior	Lewisville, North Carolina
23	James Johnson	F	6'8"	Freshman	Cheyenne, Wyoming
20	Mike Lepore	G	6'1"	Junior	Flemington, New Jersey
13	Chas McFarland	C	6'11"	Sophomore	Lovington, Illinois
30	Matt Smith	G	6'2"	Junior	Advance, North Carolina
45	Jason Philippe	G	6'3"	Freshman	South Ozone Park, New York
31	Jamie Skeen	F	6'8"	Sophomore	Charlotte, North Carolina
10	Ishmael Smith	G	6'0"	Sophomore	Concord, North Carolina
11	Cameron Stanley	F	6'6"	(RS) Junior	Raleigh, North Carolina
0	Jeff Teague	G	6'2"	Freshman	Indianapolis, Indiana
44	David Weaver	F/C	6'10"	(RS) Sophomore	Black Mountain, North Carolina
42	L. D. Williams	G	6'4"	Sophomore	Yadkinville, North Carolina

== Schedule ==
Date time, TV	Rank^{#}	Opponent^{#}	Result	Record	Site city, state
Regular season
Nov 9, 2007*		Fairfield	W 85–60	1–0	LJVM Coliseum; Winston-Salem, NC
Nov 19, 2007*		NC Central	W 75–58	2–0	LJVM Coliseum; Winston-Salem, NC
Nov 23, 2007*		Winston-Salem	W 73–53	3–0	LJVM Coliseum; Winston-Salem, NC
Nov 26, 2007*		at Iowa	W 56–47	4–0	Carver–Hawkeye Arena; Iowa City, IA
Nov 29, 2007*		at Charlotte	L 59–63	4–1	Dale F. Halton Arena; Charlotte, NC
Dec 1, 2007*		USC Upstate	W 72–48	5–1	LJVM Coliseum; Winston-Salem, NC
Dec 5, 2007*		at No. 23 Vanderbilt	L 80–83	5–2	Memorial Gymnasium; Nashville, TN
Dec 8, 2007*		at Georgia	L 50–72	5–3	Stegeman Coliseum; Athens, GA
Dec 16, 2007		Bucknell	W 72–56	6–3	LJVM Coliseum; Winston-Salem, NC
Dec 19, 2007*		South Florida	W 74–61	7–3	LJVM Coliseum; Winston-Salem, NC
Dec 23, 2007		Virginia Tech	W 77–75	8–3 (1–0)	LJVM Coliseum; Winston-Salem, NC
Dec 30, 2007*		Air Force	W 78–67	9–3	LJVM Coliseum; Winston-Salem, NC
Jan 2, 2008*		Presbyterian	W 70–58	10–3	LJVM Coliseum; Winston-Salem, NC
Jan 8, 2008*		BYU	W 79–62	11–3	LJVM Coliseum; Winston-Salem, NC
Jan 12, 2008		at Boston College	L 73–112	11–4 (1–1)	Conte Forum; Boston, MA
Jan 15, 2008		at Maryland	L 64–71	11–5 (1–2)	Comcast Center; College Park, MD
Jan 20, 2008		Florida State	W 74–57	12–5 (2–2)	LJVM Coliseum; Winston-Salem, NC
Jan 22, 2008*		Clemson	L 75–80 ^{OT}	12–6 (2–3)	Littlejohn Coliseum; Clemson, SC
Jan 29, 2008		Miami (FL)	W 70–68	13–6 (3–3)	LJVM Coliseum; Winston-Salem, NC
Feb 3, 2008		at NC State; Rivalry	L 65–67	13–7 (3–4)	RBC Center; Raleigh, NC
Feb 6, 2008		Georgia Tech	L 83–89	13–8 (3–5)	LJVM Coliseum; Winston-Salem, NC
Feb 9, 2008		Virginia	W 80–64	14–8 (4–5)	LJVM Coliseum; Winston-Salem, NC
Feb 14, 2008		at Florida State	W 78–70	15–8 (5–5)	Tallahassee-Leon County Civic Center; Tallahassee, FL
Feb 17, 2008		No. 2 Duke	W 86–73	16–8 (6–5)	LJVM Coliseum; Winston-Salem, NC
Feb 24, 2008		at No. 3 North Carolina; Rivalry	L 73–89	16–9 (6–6)	Dean Smith Center; Chapel Hill, NC
Feb 28, 2008		Maryland	L 70–74	16–10 (6–7)	LJVM Coliseum; Winston-Salem, NC
Mar 1, 2008		at Georgia Tech	L 79–87 ^{OT}	16–11 (6–8)	Alexander Memorial Coliseum; Atlanta, GA
Mar 4, 2008		at Virginia Tech	L 58–80	16–12 (6–9)	Cassell Coliseum; Blacksburg, VA
Mar 8, 2008		NC State; Rivalry	W 78–67	17–12 (7–9)	LJVM Coliseum; Winston-Salem, NC
ACC tournament
Mar 13, 2008	(8)	vs. (9) Florida State; First Round	L 60–70	17–13	Charlotte Bobcats Arena; Charlotte, NC
*Non-conference game. ^{#}Rankings from AP Poll. (#) Tournament seedings in parentheses.
