= James Gist =

American basketball player (born 1986)

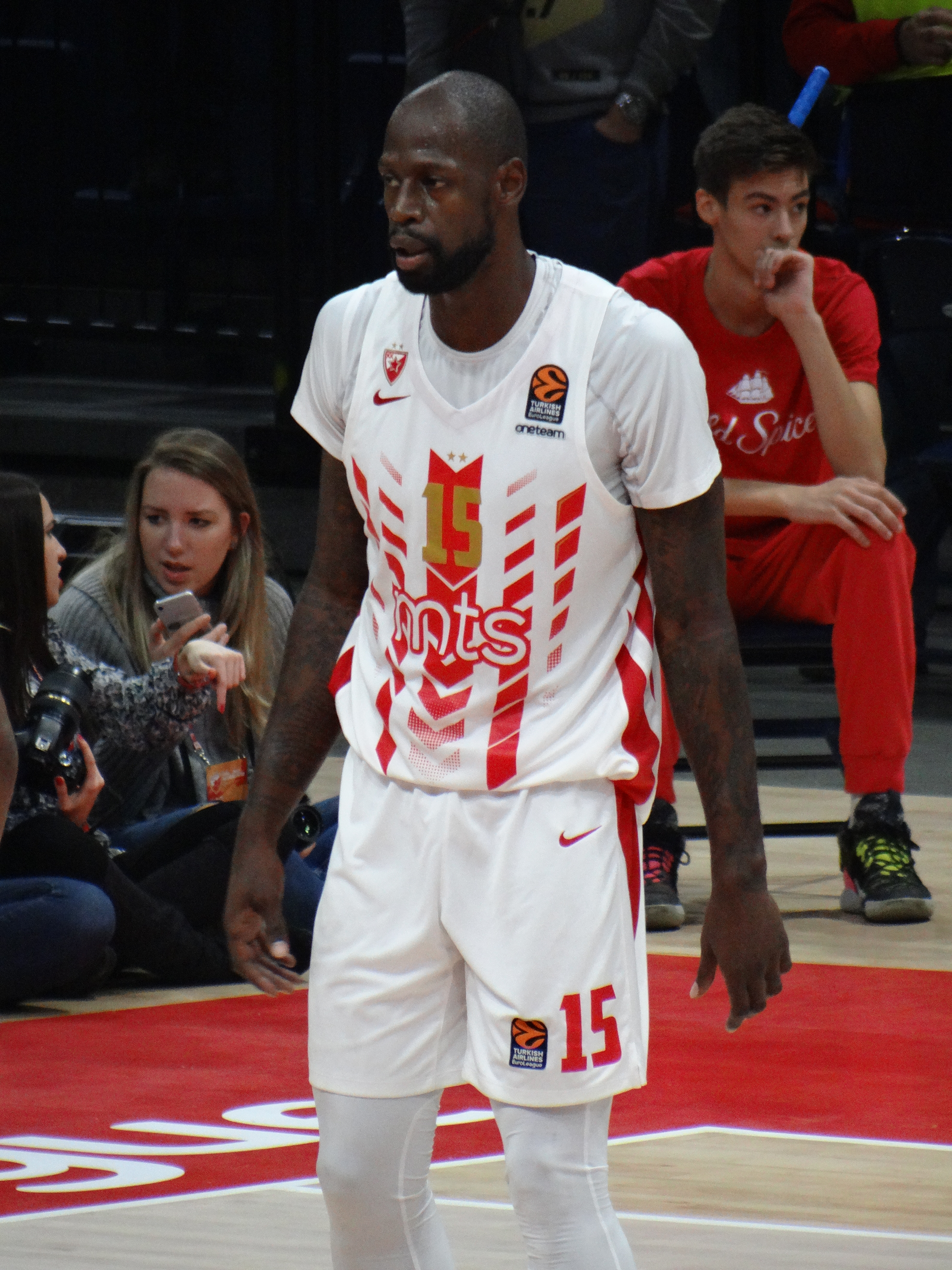
- Gist with Crvena zvezda in 2019

Personal information
- Born: October 26, 1986 (age 40) Adana, Turkey
- Listed height: 6 ft 9 in (2.06 m)
- Listed weight: 235 lb (107 kg)

Career information
- High school: Our Lady of Good Counsel (Wheaton, Maryland)
- College: Maryland (2004–2008)
- NBA draft: 2008: 2nd round, 57th overall pick
- Drafted by: San Antonio Spurs
- Playing career: 2008–2024
- Position: Power forward

Career history
- 2008–2009: Biella
- 2009–2010: Lokomotiv Kuban
- 2010–2011: Partizan
- 2011–2012: Fenerbahçe
- 2012: Málaga
- 2012–2019: Panathinaikos
- 2019–2020: Crvena zvezda
- 2020–2021: Bayern Munich
- 2021–2022: ASVEL
- 2022–2023: Bahçeşehir Koleji
- 2023: Peñarol
- 2024: Prawira Bandung

Career highlights
- Pro A champion (2022); 5× Greek League champion (2013, 2014, 2017–2019); 3× All-Greek League Defensive Team (2015–2017); 3× All-Greek League Second Team (2014–2017); 6× Greek Cup winner (2013–2017, 2019); 4× Greek All-Star Game (2013, 2014, 2018, 2019); ABA League champion (2011); Serbian League champion (2011); Serbian Cup winner (2011); Serbian Cup MVP (2011); Spanish League League Slam Dunk Contest winner (2012); Turkish Super League All-Star (2012); Second-team All-ACC (2008); ACC All-Defensive Team (2008)
- Stats at Basketball Reference

James Clough Gist III (born October 26, 1986) is an American former professional basketball player. Standing at 6 ft 9 in (2.06 m), he played as a power forward and small ball center. Born in Adana, Turkey, he played high school basketball for Our Lady of Good Counsel, before enrolling to the University of Maryland to play college basketball for the Terrapins, from 2004 to 2008. Gist was considered for a time one of the best forward-centers in Europe, due to his defensive abilities and for his dunks, alley-oops, and his athleticism.

== High school career ==
Gist attended Our Lady of Good Counsel High School. In his senior season, he averaged 19.5 points per game, to go along with 10.3 rebounds and 3.5 blocks per game, while he also became his school's all-time leader in blocked shots, with over 300.

== College career ==
Gist played college basketball at the University of Maryland, where he played with the Maryland Terrapins. Gist scored a career-high 31 points against Wake Forest. Throughout the course of 4 NCAA Division I seasons, Gist appeared in 130 games for Maryland, averaging 10.9 points per game, 6.0 rebounds per game, and 1.8 blocks per game. At the time of his graduation, Gist was fourth all-time in blocked shots for Maryland, with 231, tenth in rebounds, with 783, and seventeenth in points scored, with 1,414 (later surpassed by Greivis Vásquez).

== Professional career ==
Gist was drafted 57th overall, in the 2008 NBA draft, by the San Antonio Spurs. After spending a year with the Italian League club Biella, Gist signed a contract with the Russian team Lokomotiv-Kuban for the 2009–10 season. Gist played for the Spurs in the 2010 NBA Summer League, but was waived on October 19, 2010.

Then he played with Partizan Belgrade during the 2010–11 season, where he won the Basketball League of Serbia championship, the Radivoj Korać Cup, and the Adriatic League championship. In the summer of 2011, he signed a contract with the Turkish League club Fenerbahçe Ülker. Shortly afterwards, it was announced that he had a sample that tested positive for cannabis use, while playing for Partizan. On July 7, 2012, Fenerbahçe announced that Gist would not play the next season with the club.

On August 15, 2012, Gist signed one-year deal (with an option for one more season) with the Spanish League club Unicaja Málaga. On September 26, he won the slam dunk contest of the Spanish League. Gist joined the legendary Greek League club Panathinaikos, in December 2012, as part of a trade with Andy Panko. At the end of the season, Gist renewed his contract with Panathinaikos for two additional seasons.

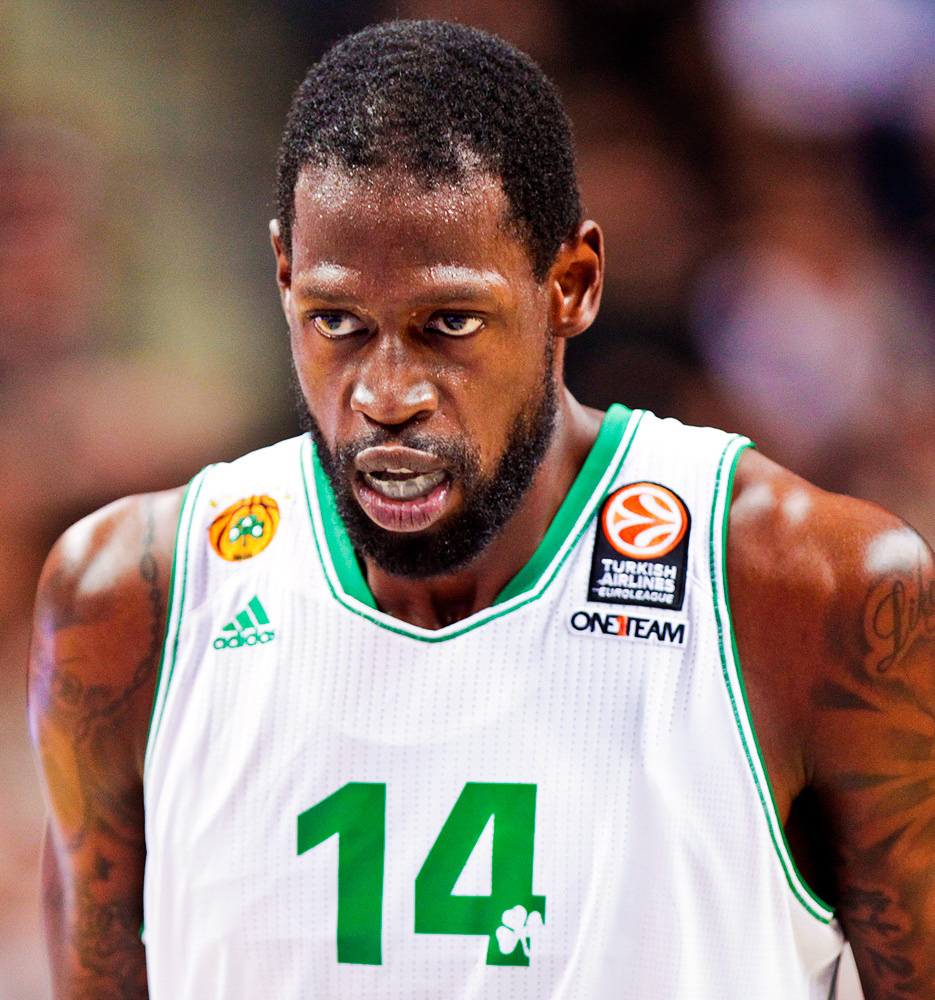
Gist with Panathinaikos

On March 17, 2015, Panathinaikos announced that they had agreed to terms with Gist to renew his contract for an extra two years, keeping him in Athens until 2017.

On April 5, 2015, Gist again tested positive for cannabis use, for the second time in his career, after the Greek Cup final against Apollon Patras. Eventually, on May 12, Gist was suspended for 8 months from participating in sports events. In the end, his suspension was reduced to 6 months, and Gist was allowed to play normally, from the beginning of the season. On October 22, 2015, while competing with Panathinaikos in a EuroLeague 2015–16 season game against Karşıyaka, Gist made a new personal EuroLeague career single-game scoring high, with 27 points scored.

On July 5, 2017, Gist signed a two-year contract extension with Panathinaikos.

On July 8, 2019, Gist signed a two-year contract with Serbian team Crvena zvezda. He averaged 7.0 points, 4.4 rebounds and 1.3 assists per game.

On December 3, 2020, he signed with Bayern Munich of the Basketball Bundesliga.

On September 25, 2021, he has signed with ASVEL of the LNB Pro A. The contract was extended to the end of the season on December 15.

On November 4, 2022, he signed with Bahçeşehir Koleji of the Basketbol Süper Ligi (BSL). He also played in Uruguay for Peñarol and in Indonesia for Prawira Bandung, before ending his playing career by joining the Pro-Fit Basketball Training camp as a trainer.

== Personal life ==
Gist is the son of Linda and James C. Gist Jr., and was born in İncirlik, Adana, Turkey, on October 26, 1986, when his father was in the US Air Force, and stationed at İncirlik Air Base. He was the first American child who was born at İncirlik Air Base.

== Career statistics ==
Legend
GP	Games played	GS	Games started	MPG	Minutes per game
FG%	Field-goal percentage	3P%	3-point field-goal percentage	FT%	Free-throw percentage
RPG	Rebounds per game	APG	Assists per game	SPG	Steals per game
BPG	Blocks per game	PPG	Points per game	PIR	Performance index rating
**Bold**	Career high

=== Career statistics ===
Year	Team	GP	GS	MPG	FG%	3P%	FT%	RPG	APG	SPG	BPG	PPG	PIR
2010–11	Partizan	14	9	**29.9**	.384	**.467**	.681	**6.9**	**1.6**	1.0	**1.0**	**11.4**	**11.8**
2011–12	Fenerbahçe	16	16	25.1	.479	.321	**.769**	4.5	.9	**1.3**	.9	7.4	8.8
2012–13	Unicaja / Panathinaikos	29	14	22.2	.426	.347	.587	4.5	.6	.7	.7	8.1	8.1
2013–14	Panathinaikos	26	17	23.4	.530	.342	.629	3.6	.8	1.1	.7	8.9	9.5
2014–15	Panathinaikos	28	17	23.0	.456	.319	.731	4.3	1.5	1.0	.6	9.5	10.5
2015–16	Panathinaikos	26	26	26.3	.535	.345	.565	4.6	1.5	1.0	.6	10.9	11.4
2016–17	Panathinaikos	15	14	22.5	.536	.167	.633	4.3	.8	1.1	.5	8.5	8.9
2017–18	Panathinaikos	**34**	**28**	25.2	**.546**	.250	.674	4.4	1.0	.8	.4	9.8	10.5
2018–19	Panathinaikos	33	14	20.8	.534	.391	.706	3.5	1.2	.6	.4	7.8	9.1
2019–20	Crvena zvezda	25	7	20.3	.417	.211	.593	4.4	1.3	.7	.4	7.0	6.7
2020–21	Bayern Munich	23	12	21.6	.444	.167	.638	3.0	.7	.7	.3	5.6	4.2
2021–22	ASVEL	28	21	21.3	.444	.185	.533	2.5	.6	.6	.6	6.0	4.8
2024	Prawira Harum Bandung	16	16	27.6	.483	.220	.694	**8.8**	**2.7**	**1.3**	**1.1**	**11.4**	
