= 2007–08 NCAA Division I men's basketball season =

Basketball season

- Preseason AP No. 1: North Carolina Tar Heels
- Regular season: November 5, 2007– March 16, 2008
- NCAA Tournament: 2008
- Tournament dates: March 20 – April 7, 2008
- National Championship: Alamodome; San Antonio, Texas
- NCAA Champions: Kansas Jayhawks
- Other champions: Ohio State Buckeyes (NIT), Tulsa Golden Hurricane (CBI)
- Player of the Year (Naismith, Wooden): Tyler Hansbrough, North Carolina Tar Heels

The 2007–08 NCAA Division I men's basketball season began on November 5, 2007 ended with the 2008 NCAA Division I men's basketball tournament's championship game on April 7, 2008, at the Alamodome in San Antonio, Texas.

== Season headlines ==
- Behind Mario Chalmers' clutch three-pointer at the end of regulation, the Kansas Jayhawks won an overtime battle against the Memphis Tigers to take their third NCAA tournament title, twenty years after Danny Manning led the Jayhawks to their last championship. Bill Self sheds the title of "best coach never to go to a Final Four" in dramatic fashion.
- For the first time since teams were seeded for the NCAA tournament, all four number one seeds (Kansas, Memphis, North Carolina, and UCLA) advanced to the Final Four.
- In February, Kelvin Sampson agreed to a buyout and was relieved of his duties as coach of Indiana University following a recruiting scandal concerning impermissible phone calls. Dan Dakich was named interim coach, but the damage had been done as the Hoosiers (ranked No. 14 at the time Sampson was fired) go 3–4 the rest of the season and bow out to Arkansas in a listless performance in the first round of the NCAA tournament. After the season, IU hired Marquette coach Tom Crean to tackle the major rebuilding job ahead.
- Sophomore Stephen Curry put on a shooting display as the Davidson Wildcats upset Gonzaga, Georgetown and Wisconsin - then narrowly succumbed to eventual champion Kansas 59–57 - to go to their first Elite Eight since 1969. Curry scored 40, 30, 33 and 25 points in the four games and was named the Midwest Region Most Outstanding Player.
- North Carolina's Tyler Hansbrough and Kansas State's Michael Beasley engaged in a season-long battle for National player of the year honors. Hansbrough swept the POY awards, while Beasley won all Freshman of the Year awards and joined Hansbrough as a unanimous first-team All-American.
- Memphis flirted with being the first undefeated team since 1976. They started the season 26–0, but on February 23 cross-state rival Tennessee defeated the Tigers 66–62 on Memphis' home floor in a battle of the #1 and #2 teams. The Tigers finished the season 38–2, setting a single-season record for wins. However, all 38 wins were vacated by the NCAA in 2009, due to an invalid SAT score for star Derrick Rose.
- After beating Memphis, Tennessee attained the #1 ranking for the first time in school history. They lost their next game at Vanderbilt.
- The preseason AP All-American team was named on November 5. Tyler Hansbrough of North Carolina was the leading vote-getter (71 of 72 votes). The rest of the team included Roy Hibbert of Georgetown (62 votes), Chris Lofton of Tennessee (61), Drew Neitzel of Michigan State (31) and Darren Collison of UCLA (31).
- The Drake Bulldogs — picked in the preseason to finish ninth in the 10-team Missouri Valley Conference — had a dream season, starting 13–0, finishing 28–5 - and were ranked as high as #14 at one point during the season. Drake's charge was led by an unlikely hero — senior point guard Adam Emmenecker, a three-year walk-on who would go on to capture both the MVC's regular-season and tournament Most Valuable Player awards.
- On February 4, career coaching wins leader Bob Knight retired as head coach of Texas Tech, handing the reins to his son Pat. Knight would reappear as a studio host for ESPN in the postseason.
- A severe storm ripped a hole in the Georgia Dome, wreaking havoc on the SEC tournament. After game delays and a venue change, the Georgia Bulldogs scored an unlikely championship run that included winning two games in one day.
- At Arizona, coach Lute Olson took an unexpected leave of absence just prior to the season's start. Kevin O'Neill, assistant coach and supposed Olson successor, was named interim coach. Olson announced he would return for 2008–09 and did not retain O'Neill on his staff as rumors of a disagreement between the two swirled.
- The first College Basketball Invitational was held, offering a post-season alternative to teams not selected for the NCAA tournament or NIT. Tulsa defeats Bradley in a best of three series to take the inaugural title.
- Wake Forest head coach Skip Prosser died at 56 of an apparent heart attack the July before the season began. Assistant Dino Gaudio was named successor and led the Deacons through an emotional year punctuated by an upset of Duke.
- Lester Hudson of Tennessee-Martin recorded the first-ever quadruple-double in NCAA history. Against Central Baptist College, Hudson scored 25 points, grabbed 12 rebounds, dished out 10 assists and recorded 10 steals in a 116–74 win.
- On January 23, Baylor beat Texas A&M 116–110 in five overtimes in the season's longest (and perhaps wildest) game.
- Houston's Rob McKiver scored 52 points (including seven three-pointers) in a game against Southern Mississippi to set the single-game scoring high for the season.
- Stephen Curry broke the NCAA record for three-pointers made in a season, connecting on 162. The previous record had been held by Butler's Darrin Fitzgerald set in 1987.
- Mike Krzyzewski, and Eddie Sutton each won their 800th career games.
- North Carolina's Tyler Hansbrough, Tennessee's Chris Lofton, Vanderbilt's Shan Foster, Virginia's Sean Singletary, Western Kentucky's Courtney Lee, Utah State's Jaycee Carroll, Colorado's Richard Roby, UNC Greensboro's Kyle Hines, High Point's Arizona Reid, Rider's Jason Thompson, Hofstra's Antoine Agudio, New Orleans' Bo McCalebb and VMI's Reggie Williams all eclipsed the career 2000-point mark during the season.
- Effective this season, the Mid-Continent Conference changed its name to The Summit League.
- Presbyterian, Cal State Bakersfield, Florida Gulf Coast, South Carolina Upstate and North Carolina Central, all moved up to Division I competition.
- Conference realignments: IPFW, North Dakota State and South Dakota State began play in the Summit League, while UC Davis competed in the Big West Conference for the first time. All four programs were independent in 2006–07. Valparaiso began play in the Horizon League after leaving the Summit League. Florida Gulf Coast and South Carolina Upstate joined the Atlantic Sun Conference.
- Charles Barkley, Arnie Ferrin, Danny Manning, Billy Packer, Jim Phelan, Nolan Richardson and Dick Vitale were inducted into the College Basketball Hall of Fame.
- Billy Packer announced his last Final Four after 34 years of broadcasting the event.

== Major rule changes ==
Beginning in 2007–08, the following rules changes were implemented:

- During free throws, eliminated the first lane space nearest the basket on each side of the lane and used the second, third and fourth lane space on each side as an alignment for free throws. This rule had been used in NCAA women's basketball since the 2001–02 season.
- Use of courtside monitor allowed for determining whether a flagrant foul occurred or to assess the situation during a fight.

== Season outlook ==
=== Pre-season polls ===
The top 25 from the AP and ESPN/USA Today Coaches Polls November 5, 2007.

Associated Press
| Ranking | Team |
|---|---|
| 1 | North Carolina (29) |
| 2 | UCLA (24) |
| 3 | Memphis (18) |
| 4 | Kansas |
| 5 | Georgetown (1) |
| 6 | Louisville |
| 7 | Tennessee |
| 8 | Michigan State |
| 9 | Indiana |
| 10 | Washington State |
| 11 | Marquette |
| 12 | Oregon |
| 13 | Duke |
| 14 | Gonzaga |
| 15 | Texas |
| 16 | Texas A&M |
| 17 | Arizona |
| 18 | USC |
| 19 | Arkansas |
| 20 | Kentucky |
| 21 | North Carolina State |
| 22 | Pittsburgh |
| 23 | Stanford |
| 24 | Southern Illinois |
| 25 | Kansas State |

ESPN/USA Today Coaches
| Ranking | Team |
|---|---|
| 1 | North Carolina (10) |
| 2 | UCLA (12) |
| 3 | Memphis (8) |
| 4 | Kansas (1) |
| 5 | Georgetown |
| 6 | Louisville |
| 7 | Tennessee |
| 8 | Michigan State |
| 9 | Indiana |
| 10 | Washington State |
| 11 | Duke |
| 12 | Marquette |
| 13 | Oregon |
| 14 | Gonzaga |
| 15 | Texas A&M |
| 16 | Texas |
| 17 | Arizona |
| 18 | USC |
| 19 | Arkansas |
| 20 | Pittsburgh |
| 21 | Stanford |
| 22 | Kentucky |
| 23 | Southern Illinois |
| 24 | North Carolina State |
| 25 | Villanova |

== Conference membership changes ==
These schools joined new conferences for the 2007–08 season.

| School | Former conference | New conference |
|---|---|---|
| Cal State Bakersfield Roadrunners | CCAA (D-II) | NCAA Division I independent |
| Florida Gulf Coast Eagles | NCAA Division II independent | Atlantic Sun Conference |
| Indiana–Purdue Fort Wayne (IPFW) Mastodons | NCAA Division I independent | Summit League |
| North Carolina Central Eagles | CIAA (D-II) | NCAA Division I independent |
| North Dakota State Bison | NCAA Division I independent | Summit League |
| Presbyterian Blue Hose | South Atlantic Conference (D-II) | NCAA Division I independent |
| South Carolina (USC) Upstate Spartans | Peach Belt Conference (D-II) | Atlantic Sun Conference |
| South Dakota State Jackrabbits | NCAA Division I independent | Summit League |
| UC Davis Aggies | NCAA Division I independent | Big West Conference |
| Valparaiso Crusaders | Summit League | Horizon League |
| Winston-Salem State Rams | NCAA Division I independent | Mid-Eastern Athletic Conference |

== Regular season ==
=== Conferences ===
==== Conference winners and tournaments ====
Thirty conference seasons concluded with a single-elimination tournament. Conference tournament winners received an automatic bid to the 2008 NCAA Division I men's basketball tournament. The Ivy League was the only NCAA Division I conference that did not hold a conference tournament, instead sending its regular-season champion, Cornell, to the NCAA tournament.

| Conference | Regular Season Winner | Conference Player of the Year | Conference Tournament | Tournament Venue (City) | Tournament winner |
|---|---|---|---|---|---|
| America East Conference | UMBC | Marqus Blakely, Vermont | 2008 America East men's basketball tournament | Binghamton University Events Center (Binghamton, New York) | UMBC |
| Atlantic 10 Conference | Xavier | Gary Forbes, Massachusetts | 2008 Atlantic 10 men's basketball tournament | Boardwalk Hall (Atlantic City, New Jersey) | Temple |
| Atlantic Coast Conference | North Carolina | Tyler Hansbrough, North Carolina | 2008 ACC men's basketball tournament | Charlotte Bobcats Arena (Charlotte, North Carolina) | North Carolina |
| Atlantic Sun Conference | Belmont | Thomas Sanders, Gardner-Webb | 2008 Atlantic Sun men's basketball tournament | Allen Arena (Nashville, Tennessee) | Belmont |
| Big 12 Conference | Kansas & Texas | Michael Beasley, Kansas State | 2008 Big 12 men's basketball tournament | Sprint Center (Kansas City, Missouri) | Kansas |
| Big East Conference | Georgetown | Luke Harangody, Notre Dame | 2008 Big East men's basketball tournament | Madison Square Garden (New York City, New York) | Pittsburgh |
| Big Sky Conference | Portland State | Jeremiah Dominguez, Portland State | 2008 Big Sky men's basketball tournament | Rose Garden (Portland, Oregon) | Portland State |
| Big South Conference | UNC Asheville & Winthrop | Arizona Reid, High Point | 2008 Big South Conference men's basketball tournament | Campus Sites | Winthrop |
| Big Ten Conference | Wisconsin | D. J. White, Indiana | 2008 Big Ten Conference men's basketball tournament | Conseco Fieldhouse (Indianapolis, Indiana) | Wisconsin |
| Big West Conference | Cal State Fullerton, Cal State Northridge & UC Santa Barbara | Scott Cutley, Cal State Fullerton & Alex Harris, UC Santa Barbara | 2008 Big West Conference men's basketball tournament | Anaheim Convention Center (Anaheim, California) | Cal State Fullerton |
| Colonial Athletic Association | VCU | Eric Maynor, VCU | 2008 CAA men's basketball tournament | Richmond Coliseum (Richmond, Virginia) | George Mason |
| Conference USA | Memphis | Chris Douglas-Roberts, Memphis | 2008 Conference USA men's basketball tournament | FedExForum (Memphis, Tennessee) | Memphis |
| Horizon League | Butler | Mike Green, Butler | 2008 Horizon League men's basketball tournament | Campus Sites | Butler |
| Ivy League | Cornell | Louis Dale, Cornell | No Tournament | | |
| Metro Atlantic Athletic Conference | Rider & Siena | Jason Thompson, Rider | 2008 MAAC men's basketball tournament | Times Union Center (Albany, New York) | Siena |
| Mid-American Conference | Kent State (East); Western Michigan (West) | Al Fisher, Kent State | 2008 MAC men's basketball tournament | Quicken Loans Arena (Cleveland, Ohio) | Kent State |
| Mid-Eastern Athletic Conference | Morgan State | Jamar Smith, Morgan State | 2008 Mid-Eastern Athletic Conference men's basketball tournament | RBC Center (Raleigh, North Carolina) | Coppin State |
| Missouri Valley Conference | Drake | Adam Emmenecker, Drake | 2008 Missouri Valley Conference men's basketball tournament | Scottrade Center (St. Louis, Missouri) | Drake |
| Mountain West Conference | BYU | Lee Cummard, BYU & J. R. Giddens, New Mexico | 2008 MWC men's basketball tournament | Thomas & Mack Center (Las Vegas, Nevada) | UNLV |
| Northeast Conference | Robert Morris | Tony Lee, Robert Morris | 2008 Northeast Conference men's basketball tournament | Campus Sites | Mount St. Mary's |
| Ohio Valley Conference | Austin Peay | Lester Hudson, Tennessee-Martin | 2008 Ohio Valley Conference men's basketball tournament | Nashville Municipal Auditorium (Nashville, Tennessee) | Austin Peay |
| Pacific-10 Conference | UCLA | Kevin Love, UCLA | 2008 Pacific-10 Conference men's basketball tournament | Staples Center (Los Angeles, California) | UCLA |
| Patriot League | American | Greg Sprink, Navy | 2008 Patriot League men's basketball tournament | Campus Sites | American |
| Southeastern Conference | Tennessee (East); Mississippi State (West) | Shan Foster, Vanderbilt | 2008 SEC men's basketball tournament | Georgia Dome and Alexander Memorial Coliseum (Atlanta, Georgia) | Georgia |
| Southern Conference | Appalachian State & Chattanooga (North); Davidson (South) | Stephen Curry, Davidson | 2008 Southern Conference men's basketball tournament | North Charleston Coliseum (North Charleston, South Carolina) | Davidson |
| Southland Conference | Lamar (East); Stephen F. Austin (West) | Josh Alexander, Stephen F. Austin | 2008 Southland Conference men's basketball tournament | Leonard E. Merrell Center (Katy, Texas) | Texas-Arlington |
| Southwestern Athletic Conference | Alabama State | Andrew Hayles, Alabama State | 2008 Southwestern Athletic Conference men's basketball tournament | Fair Park Arena (Birmingham, Alabama) | Mississippi Valley State |
| The Summit League | Oral Roberts | George Hill, IUPUI | 2008 Summit League men's basketball tournament | John Q. Hammons Arena (Tulsa, Oklahoma) | Oral Roberts4Tea |
| Sun Belt Conference | South Alabama (East); Arkansas-Little Rock & Louisiana-Lafayette (West) | Courtney Lee, Western Kentucky | 2008 Sun Belt men's basketball tournament | Mitchell Center (Mobile, Alabama) | Western Kentucky |
| West Coast Conference | Gonzaga | Jeremy Pargo, Gonzaga | 2008 West Coast Conference men's basketball tournament | Jenny Craig Pavilion (San Diego, California) | San Diego |
| Western Athletic Conference | Utah State; Nevada; New Mexico State & Boise State | Jaycee Carroll, Utah State | 2008 WAC men's basketball tournament | Pan American Center (Las Cruces, New Mexico) | Boise State |

==== Conference standings ====
2007–08 America East men's basketball standings
| | Conf. | | | | Overall |
| Team | W | | L | PCT | W | | L | PCT |
|---|---|---|---|---|---|---|---|---|
| UMBC † | 13 | – | 3 | .813 | 24 | – | 9 | .727 |
| Hartford | 10 | – | 6 | .625 | 18 | – | 16 | .529 |
| Albany | 10 | – | 6 | .625 | 15 | – | 15 | .500 |
| Vermont | 9 | – | 7 | .563 | 16 | – | 15 | .516 |
| Binghamton | 9 | – | 7 | .563 | 14 | – | 16 | .467 |
| Boston University | 9 | – | 7 | .563 | 14 | – | 17 | .452 |
| New Hampshire | 6 | – | 10 | .375 | 9 | – | 20 | .310 |
| Stony Brook | 3 | – | 13 | .188 | 7 | – | 23 | .233 |
| Maine | 3 | – | 13 | .188 | 7 | – | 23 | .233 |
† America East tournament winner As of March 17, 2008; Rankings from AP Poll

2007–08 Atlantic 10 men's basketball standings
| | Conf. | | | | Overall |
| Team | W | | L | PCT | W | | L | PCT |
|---|---|---|---|---|---|---|---|---|
| No. 12 Xavier | 14 | – | 2 | .875 | 30 | – | 7 | .811 |
| Temple † | 11 | – | 5 | .688 | 21 | – | 13 | .618 |
| UMass | 10 | – | 6 | .625 | 25 | – | 11 | .694 |
| Saint Joseph's | 9 | – | 7 | .563 | 21 | – | 13 | .618 |
| Charlotte | 9 | – | 7 | .563 | 20 | – | 14 | .588 |
| Richmond | 9 | – | 7 | .563 | 16 | – | 15 | .516 |
| Dayton | 8 | – | 8 | .500 | 23 | – | 11 | .676 |
| La Salle | 8 | – | 8 | .500 | 15 | – | 17 | .469 |
| Rhode Island | 7 | – | 9 | .438 | 21 | – | 12 | .636 |
| Duquesne | 7 | – | 9 | .438 | 17 | – | 13 | .567 |
| Saint Louis | 7 | – | 9 | .438 | 16 | – | 15 | .516 |
| Fordham | 6 | – | 10 | .375 | 12 | – | 17 | .414 |
| George Washington | 5 | – | 11 | .313 | 9 | – | 17 | .346 |
| St. Bonaventure | 2 | – | 14 | .125 | 8 | – | 22 | .267 |
† 2008 Atlantic 10 Tournament winner Rankings from AP poll

2007–08 ACC men's basketball standings
| | Conf. | | | | Overall |
| Team | W | | L | PCT | W | | L | PCT |
|---|---|---|---|---|---|---|---|---|
| No. 1 North Carolina † | 14 | – | 2 | .875 | 36 | – | 3 | .923 |
| No. 9 Duke | 13 | – | 3 | .813 | 28 | – | 6 | .824 |
| No. 22 Clemson | 10 | – | 6 | .625 | 24 | – | 10 | .706 |
| Virginia Tech | 9 | – | 7 | .563 | 21 | – | 14 | .600 |
| Miami (FL) | 8 | – | 8 | .500 | 23 | – | 11 | .676 |
| Maryland | 8 | – | 8 | .500 | 19 | – | 15 | .559 |
| Georgia Tech | 7 | – | 9 | .438 | 15 | – | 17 | .469 |
| Wake Forest | 7 | – | 9 | .438 | 17 | – | 13 | .567 |
| Florida State | 7 | – | 9 | .438 | 19 | – | 15 | .559 |
| Virginia | 5 | – | 11 | .313 | 17 | – | 16 | .515 |
| Boston College | 4 | – | 12 | .250 | 14 | – | 17 | .452 |
| NC State | 4 | – | 12 | .250 | 15 | – | 16 | .484 |
† 2008 ACC tournament winner Rankings from AP Poll

2007–08 Atlantic Sun men's basketball standings
| | Conf. | | | | Overall |
| Team | W | | L | PCT | W | | L | PCT |
|---|---|---|---|---|---|---|---|---|
| Belmont † | 14 | – | 2 | .875 | 25 | – | 9 | .735 |
| Jacksonville | 12 | – | 4 | .750 | 18 | – | 13 | .581 |
| East Tennessee State | 11 | – | 5 | .688 | 19 | – | 13 | .594 |
| Stetson | 11 | – | 5 | .688 | 16 | – | 16 | .500 |
| Gardner–Webb | 9 | – | 7 | .563 | 16 | – | 16 | .500 |
| Lipscomb | 9 | – | 7 | .563 | 15 | – | 16 | .484 |
| Kennesaw State | 7 | – | 9 | .438 | 10 | – | 20 | .333 |
| Mercer | 6 | – | 10 | .375 | 11 | – | 19 | .367 |
| Florida Gulf Coast | 6 | – | 10 | .375 | 10 | – | 21 | .323 |
| Campbell | 5 | – | 11 | .313 | 10 | – | 20 | .333 |
| USC Upstate | 5 | – | 11 | .313 | 7 | – | 23 | .233 |
| North Florida | 1 | – | 15 | .063 | 3 | – | 26 | .103 |
† 2008 Atlantic Sun Tournament winner As of March 3, 2008; Rankings from AP Poll

2007–08 Big East men's basketball standings
| | Conf. | | | | Overall |
| Team | W | | L | PCT | W | | L | PCT |
|---|---|---|---|---|---|---|---|---|
| No. 8 Georgetown | 15 | – | 3 | .833 | 28 | – | 6 | .824 |
| No. 13 Louisville | 14 | – | 4 | .778 | 27 | – | 9 | .750 |
| No. 15 Notre Dame | 14 | – | 4 | .778 | 25 | – | 8 | .758 |
| No. 16 Connecticut | 13 | – | 5 | .722 | 24 | – | 9 | .727 |
| West Virginia | 11 | – | 7 | .611 | 26 | – | 11 | .703 |
| No. 25 Marquette | 11 | – | 7 | .611 | 25 | – | 10 | .714 |
| No. 17 Pittsburgh† | 10 | – | 8 | .556 | 27 | – | 10 | .730 |
| Villanova | 9 | – | 9 | .500 | 22 | – | 13 | .629 |
| Syracuse | 9 | – | 9 | .500 | 21 | – | 14 | .600 |
| Cincinnati | 8 | – | 10 | .444 | 13 | – | 19 | .406 |
| Seton Hall | 7 | – | 11 | .389 | 17 | – | 15 | .531 |
| Providence | 6 | – | 12 | .333 | 15 | – | 16 | .484 |
| *DePaul | 6 | – | 12 | .333 | 11 | – | 19 | .367 |
| *St. John's | 5 | – | 13 | .278 | 11 | – | 19 | .367 |
| *South Florida | 3 | – | 15 | .167 | 12 | – | 19 | .387 |
| *Rutgers | 3 | – | 15 | .167 | 11 | – | 20 | .355 |
† 2008 Big East tournament winner As of April 7, 2008; Rankings from AP Poll; *Did not qualify for 2008 Big East tournament.

2007–08 Big Sky men's basketball standings
| | Conf. | | | | Overall |
| Team | W | | L | PCT | W | | L | PCT |
|---|---|---|---|---|---|---|---|---|
| Portland State † | 14 | – | 2 | .875 | 23 | – | 10 | .697 |
| Northern Arizona | 11 | – | 5 | .688 | 21 | – | 11 | .656 |
| Weber State | 10 | – | 6 | .625 | 16 | – | 14 | .533 |
| Montana | 8 | – | 8 | .500 | 14 | – | 16 | .467 |
| Idaho State | 8 | – | 8 | .500 | 12 | – | 19 | .387 |
| Montana State | 7 | – | 9 | .438 | 15 | – | 15 | .500 |
| Northern Colorado | 6 | – | 10 | .375 | 13 | – | 16 | .448 |
| Eastern Washington | 6 | – | 10 | .375 | 11 | – | 19 | .367 |
| Sacramento State | 2 | – | 14 | .125 | 4 | – | 24 | .143 |
† 2008 Big Sky tournament winner Rankings from AP Poll

2007–08 Big South men's basketball standings
| | Conf. | | | | Overall |
| Team | W | | L | PCT | W | | L | PCT |
|---|---|---|---|---|---|---|---|---|
| UNC Asheville | 10 | – | 4 | .714 | 23 | – | 10 | .697 |
| Winthrop † | 10 | – | 4 | .714 | 22 | – | 12 | .647 |
| High Point | 8 | – | 6 | .571 | 17 | – | 14 | .548 |
| Liberty | 7 | – | 7 | .500 | 16 | – | 16 | .500 |
| VMI | 6 | – | 8 | .429 | 14 | – | 15 | .483 |
| Coastal Carolina | 6 | – | 8 | .429 | 13 | – | 15 | .464 |
| Radford | 5 | – | 9 | .357 | 10 | – | 20 | .333 |
| Charleston Southern | 4 | – | 10 | .286 | 10 | – | 20 | .333 |
† 2008 Big South tournament winner As of March 8, 2008; Rankings from AP Poll

2007–08 Big Ten Conference men's basketball standings
| | Conf. | | | | Overall |
| Team | W | | L | PCT | W | | L | PCT |
|---|---|---|---|---|---|---|---|---|
| No. 6 Wisconsin† | 16 | – | 2 | .889 | 31 | – | 5 | .861 |
| No. 20 Purdue | 15 | – | 3 | .833 | 25 | – | 9 | .735 |
| Indiana | 14 | – | 4 | .778 | 25 | – | 8 | .758 |
| No. 18 Michigan State | 12 | – | 6 | .667 | 27 | – | 9 | .750 |
| Ohio State | 10 | – | 8 | .556 | 24 | – | 13 | .649 |
| Minnesota | 8 | – | 10 | .444 | 20 | – | 14 | .588 |
| Penn State | 7 | – | 11 | .389 | 15 | – | 16 | .484 |
| Iowa | 6 | – | 12 | .333 | 13 | – | 19 | .406 |
| Illinois | 5 | – | 13 | .278 | 16 | – | 19 | .457 |
| Michigan | 5 | – | 13 | .278 | 10 | – | 22 | .313 |
| Northwestern | 1 | – | 17 | .056 | 8 | – | 22 | .267 |
† 2008 Big Ten tournament winner As of March 23, 2008; Rankings from AP poll

2007–08 Big 12 men's basketball standings
| | Conf. | | | | Overall |
| Team | W | | L | PCT | W | | L | PCT |
|---|---|---|---|---|---|---|---|---|
| No. 7 Texas | 13 | – | 3 | .813 | 31 | – | 7 | .816 |
| No. 4 Kansas † | 13 | – | 3 | .813 | 37 | – | 3 | .925 |
| Kansas State | 10 | – | 6 | .625 | 21 | – | 12 | .636 |
| Oklahoma | 9 | – | 7 | .563 | 23 | – | 12 | .657 |
| Baylor | 9 | – | 7 | .563 | 21 | – | 11 | .656 |
| Texas A&M | 8 | – | 8 | .500 | 25 | – | 11 | .694 |
| Nebraska | 7 | – | 9 | .438 | 20 | – | 13 | .606 |
| Texas Tech | 7 | – | 9 | .438 | 16 | – | 15 | .516 |
| Oklahoma State | 7 | – | 9 | .438 | 17 | – | 16 | .515 |
| Missouri | 6 | – | 10 | .375 | 16 | – | 16 | .500 |
| Iowa State | 4 | – | 12 | .250 | 14 | – | 18 | .438 |
| Colorado | 3 | – | 13 | .188 | 12 | – | 20 | .375 |
† 2008 Big 12 Tournament winner Rankings from AP poll

2007–08 Big West men's basketball standings
| | Conf. | | | | Overall |
| Team | W | | L | PCT | W | | L | PCT |
|---|---|---|---|---|---|---|---|---|
| UC Santa Barbara | 12 | – | 4 | .750 | 23 | – | 9 | .719 |
| Cal State Northridge | 12 | – | 4 | .750 | 20 | – | 10 | .667 |
| Cal State Fullerton† | 12 | – | 4 | .750 | 24 | – | 9 | .727 |
| Pacific | 11 | – | 5 | .688 | 21 | – | 10 | .677 |
| UC Irvine | 9 | – | 7 | .563 | 18 | – | 16 | .529 |
| Cal Poly | 7 | – | 9 | .438 | 12 | – | 18 | .400 |
| UC Riverside | 4 | – | 12 | .250 | 9 | – | 21 | .300 |
| Long Beach State | 3 | – | 13 | .188 | 6 | – | 25 | .194 |
| UC Davis | 2 | – | 14 | .125 | 9 | – | 22 | .290 |
† 2008 Big West tournament winner As of April 10, 2008; Rankings from AP poll

2007–08 CAA men's basketball standings
| | Conf. | | | | Overall |
| Team | W | | L | PCT | W | | L | PCT |
|---|---|---|---|---|---|---|---|---|
| VCU | 15 | – | 3 | .833 | 24 | – | 8 | .750 |
| UNC Wilmington | 12 | – | 6 | .667 | 20 | – | 13 | .606 |
| George Mason † | 12 | – | 6 | .667 | 23 | – | 11 | .676 |
| Old Dominion | 11 | – | 7 | .611 | 18 | – | 16 | .529 |
| William & Mary | 10 | – | 8 | .556 | 17 | – | 16 | .515 |
| Northeastern | 9 | – | 9 | .500 | 14 | – | 17 | .452 |
| Delaware | 9 | – | 9 | .500 | 14 | – | 17 | .452 |
| Hofstra | 8 | – | 10 | .444 | 12 | – | 18 | .400 |
| Towson | 7 | – | 11 | .389 | 13 | – | 18 | .419 |
| Drexel | 5 | – | 13 | .278 | 12 | – | 20 | .375 |
| James Madison | 5 | – | 13 | .278 | 13 | – | 17 | .433 |
| Georgia State | 5 | – | 13 | .278 | 9 | – | 21 | .300 |
† 2008 CAA tournament winner Rankings from AP poll

2007–08 Conference USA men's basketball standings
| | Conf. | | | | Overall |
| Team | W | | L | PCT | W | | L | PCT |
|---|---|---|---|---|---|---|---|---|
| No. 2 Memphis | 16 | – | 0 | 1.000 | 38 | – | 2 | .950 |
| UAB | 12 | – | 4 | .750 | 23 | – | 11 | .676 |
| Houston | 11 | – | 5 | .688 | 24 | – | 10 | .706 |
| Southern Miss | 9 | – | 7 | .563 | 19 | – | 14 | .576 |
| UCF | 9 | – | 7 | .563 | 16 | – | 15 | .516 |
| Tulsa | 8 | – | 8 | .500 | 25 | – | 14 | .641 |
| UTEP | 8 | – | 8 | .500 | 19 | – | 14 | .576 |
| Marshall | 8 | – | 8 | .500 | 16 | – | 14 | .533 |
| Tulane | 6 | – | 10 | .375 | 17 | – | 15 | .531 |
| East Carolina | 5 | – | 11 | .313 | 11 | – | 19 | .367 |
| SMU | 4 | – | 12 | .250 | 10 | – | 20 | .333 |
| Rice | 0 | – | 16 | .000 | 3 | – | 27 | .100 |
† 2008 C-USA Tournament winner Rankings from AP Poll

2007–08 Horizon League men's basketball standings
| | Conf. | | | | Overall |
| Team | W | | L | PCT | W | | L | PCT |
|---|---|---|---|---|---|---|---|---|
| No. 11 Butler † | 16 | – | 2 | .889 | 30 | – | 4 | .882 |
| Cleveland State | 12 | – | 6 | .667 | 21 | – | 13 | .618 |
| Wright State | 12 | – | 6 | .667 | 21 | – | 10 | .677 |
| Valparaiso | 9 | – | 9 | .500 | 22 | – | 14 | .611 |
| UIC | 9 | – | 9 | .500 | 18 | – | 15 | .545 |
| Green Bay | 9 | – | 9 | .500 | 15 | – | 15 | .500 |
| Milwaukee | 9 | – | 9 | .500 | 14 | – | 16 | .467 |
| Loyola Chicago | 6 | – | 12 | .333 | 12 | – | 19 | .387 |
| Youngstown State | 5 | – | 13 | .278 | 9 | – | 21 | .300 |
| Detroit | 3 | – | 15 | .167 | 7 | – | 23 | .233 |
† Horizon League Tournament winner Rankings from AP Poll

2007–08 Ivy League men's basketball standings
| | Conf. | | | | Overall |
| Team | W | | L | PCT | W | | L | PCT |
|---|---|---|---|---|---|---|---|---|
| Cornell | 14 | – | 0 | 1.000 | 22 | – | 6 | .786 |
| Brown | 11 | – | 3 | .786 | 19 | – | 10 | .655 |
| Penn | 8 | – | 6 | .571 | 13 | – | 18 | .419 |
| Columbia | 7 | – | 7 | .500 | 14 | – | 15 | .483 |
| Yale | 7 | – | 7 | .500 | 13 | – | 15 | .464 |
| Dartmouth | 3 | – | 11 | .214 | 10 | – | 18 | .357 |
| Harvard | 3 | – | 11 | .214 | 8 | – | 22 | .267 |
| Princeton | 3 | – | 11 | .214 | 6 | – | 23 | .207 |
Rankings from AP Poll

2007–08 MAAC men's basketball standings
| | Conf. | | | | Overall |
| Team | W | | L | PCT | W | | L | PCT |
|---|---|---|---|---|---|---|---|---|
| Siena † | 13 | – | 5 | .722 | 23 | – | 11 | .676 |
| Rider | 13 | – | 5 | .722 | 23 | – | 11 | .676 |
| Niagara | 12 | – | 6 | .667 | 19 | – | 10 | .655 |
| Loyola (MD) | 12 | – | 6 | .667 | 19 | – | 14 | .576 |
| Fairfield | 11 | – | 7 | .611 | 14 | – | 16 | .467 |
| Marist | 11 | – | 7 | .611 | 18 | – | 14 | .563 |
| Iona | 8 | – | 10 | .444 | 12 | – | 20 | .375 |
| Manhattan | 5 | – | 13 | .278 | 12 | – | 19 | .387 |
| Saint Peter's | 3 | – | 15 | .167 | 6 | – | 24 | .200 |
| Canisius | 2 | – | 16 | .111 | 6 | – | 25 | .194 |
† 2008 MAAC tournament winner Rankings from AP Poll

2007–08 Mid-American Conference men's basketball standings
| | Conf. | | | | Overall |
| Team | W | | L | PCT | W | | L | PCT |
|---|---|---|---|---|---|---|---|---|
East
| Kent State † | 13 | – | 3 | .813 | 28 | – | 7 | .800 |
| Akron | 11 | – | 5 | .688 | 24 | – | 11 | .686 |
| Ohio | 9 | – | 7 | .563 | 20 | – | 13 | .606 |
| Miami (OH) | 9 | – | 7 | .563 | 17 | – | 16 | .515 |
| Bowling Green | 7 | – | 9 | .438 | 13 | – | 16 | .448 |
| Buffalo | 3 | – | 13 | .188 | 10 | – | 20 | .333 |
West
| Western Michigan | 12 | – | 4 | .750 | 20 | – | 12 | .625 |
| Central Michigan | 8 | – | 8 | .500 | 14 | – | 17 | .452 |
| Eastern Michigan | 8 | – | 8 | .500 | 14 | – | 17 | .452 |
| Toledo | 7 | – | 8 | .467 | 11 | – | 19 | .367 |
| Ball State | 5 | – | 11 | .313 | 6 | – | 24 | .200 |
| Northern Illinois | 3 | – | 12 | .200 | 6 | – | 22 | .214 |
† 2008 MAC tournament winner Rankings from AP Poll

2007–08 MEAC men's basketball standings
| | Conf. | | | | Overall |
| Team | W | | L | PCT | W | | L | PCT |
|---|---|---|---|---|---|---|---|---|
| Morgan State | 14 | – | 2 | .875 | 22 | – | 11 | .667 |
| Hampton | 11 | – | 5 | .688 | 18 | – | 12 | .600 |
| Norfolk State | 11 | – | 5 | .688 | 16 | – | 15 | .516 |
| Delaware State | 10 | – | 6 | .625 | 14 | – | 16 | .467 |
| North Carolina A&T | 9 | – | 7 | .563 | 15 | – | 16 | .484 |
| Florida A&M | 9 | – | 7 | .563 | 15 | – | 17 | .469 |
| Coppin State † | 7 | – | 9 | .438 | 16 | – | 21 | .432 |
| South Carolina State | 7 | – | 9 | .438 | 13 | – | 20 | .394 |
| Bethune–Cookman | 5 | – | 11 | .313 | 11 | – | 21 | .344 |
| Howard | 3 | – | 13 | .188 | 6 | – | 26 | .188 |
| Maryland Eastern Shore | 2 | – | 14 | .125 | 4 | – | 28 | .125 |
| Winston-Salem State | | – | | – | 12 | – | 18 | .400 |
† 2008 MEAC tournament winner Rankings from AP Poll

2007–08 Missouri Valley Conference men's basketball standings
| | Conf. | | | | Overall |
| Team | W | | L | PCT | W | | L | PCT |
|---|---|---|---|---|---|---|---|---|
| No. 14 Drake † | 15 | – | 3 | .833 | 28 | – | 5 | .848 |
| Illinois State | 13 | – | 5 | .722 | 25 | – | 10 | .714 |
| Southern Illinois | 11 | – | 7 | .611 | 18 | – | 15 | .545 |
| Creighton | 10 | – | 8 | .556 | 22 | – | 11 | .667 |
| Bradley | 9 | – | 9 | .500 | 21 | – | 17 | .553 |
| Northern Iowa | 9 | – | 9 | .500 | 18 | – | 14 | .563 |
| Missouri State | 8 | – | 10 | .444 | 17 | – | 16 | .515 |
| Indiana State | 8 | – | 10 | .444 | 15 | – | 16 | .484 |
| Wichita State | 4 | – | 14 | .222 | 11 | – | 20 | .355 |
| Evansville | 3 | – | 15 | .167 | 9 | – | 21 | .300 |
† 2008 MVC tournament winner Rankings from AP Poll

2007–08 Mountain West Conference men's basketball standings
| | Conf. | | | | Overall |
| Team | W | | L | PCT | W | | L | PCT |
|---|---|---|---|---|---|---|---|---|
| BYU | 14 | – | 2 | .875 | 27 | – | 8 | .771 |
| UNLV † | 12 | – | 4 | .750 | 27 | – | 8 | .771 |
| New Mexico | 11 | – | 5 | .688 | 24 | – | 9 | .727 |
| San Diego State | 9 | – | 7 | .563 | 20 | – | 13 | .606 |
| Air Force | 8 | – | 8 | .500 | 16 | – | 14 | .533 |
| Utah | 7 | – | 9 | .438 | 18 | – | 15 | .545 |
| TCU | 6 | – | 10 | .375 | 14 | – | 16 | .467 |
| Wyoming | 5 | – | 11 | .313 | 12 | – | 18 | .400 |
| Colorado State | 0 | – | 16 | .000 | 7 | – | 25 | .219 |
† 2008 Mountain West tournament winner Rankings from AP Poll

2007–08 Northeast Conference men's basketball standings
| | Conf. | | | | Overall |
| Team | W | | L | PCT | W | | L | PCT |
|---|---|---|---|---|---|---|---|---|
| Robert Morris | 16 | – | 2 | .889 | 26 | – | 8 | .765 |
| Wagner | 15 | – | 3 | .833 | 23 | – | 8 | .742 |
| Sacred Heart | 13 | – | 5 | .722 | 18 | – | 14 | .563 |
| Mount St. Mary's † | 11 | – | 7 | .611 | 19 | – | 15 | .559 |
| Quinnipiac | 11 | – | 7 | .611 | 15 | – | 15 | .500 |
| Central Connecticut | 10 | – | 8 | .556 | 14 | – | 16 | .467 |
| Long Island | 7 | – | 11 | .389 | 15 | – | 15 | .500 |
| Monmouth | 4 | – | 14 | .222 | 7 | – | 24 | .226 |
| Fairleigh Dickinson | 4 | – | 14 | .222 | 8 | – | 20 | .286 |
| St. Francis (NY) | 4 | – | 14 | .222 | 7 | – | 22 | .241 |
| Saint Francis (PA) | 4 | – | 14 | .222 | 6 | – | 23 | .207 |
† 2008 NEC tournament winner

2007–08 Ohio Valley Conference men's basketball standings
| | Conf. | | | | Overall |
| Team | W | | L | PCT | W | | L | PCT |
|---|---|---|---|---|---|---|---|---|
| Austin Peay † | 16 | – | 4 | .800 | 24 | – | 11 | .686 |
| Murray State | 13 | – | 7 | .650 | 18 | – | 13 | .581 |
| Morehead State | 12 | – | 8 | .600 | 15 | – | 15 | .500 |
| UT Martin | 11 | – | 9 | .550 | 17 | – | 16 | .515 |
| Samford | 10 | – | 10 | .500 | 14 | – | 16 | .467 |
| Tennessee State | 10 | – | 10 | .500 | 15 | – | 17 | .469 |
| Tennessee Tech | 10 | – | 10 | .500 | 13 | – | 19 | .406 |
| Eastern Kentucky | 10 | – | 10 | .500 | 14 | – | 16 | .467 |
| Eastern Illinois | 6 | – | 14 | .300 | 7 | – | 22 | .241 |
| Jacksonville State | 5 | – | 15 | .250 | 7 | – | 22 | .241 |
| Southeast Missouri State | 7 | – | 13 | .350 | 12 | – | 19 | .387 |
† 2008 OVC tournament winner Rankings from AP Poll

2007–08 Pacific-10 Conference men's basketball standings
| | Conf. | | | | Overall |
| Team | W | | L | PCT | W | | L | PCT |
|---|---|---|---|---|---|---|---|---|
| No. 2 UCLA† | 16 | – | 2 | .889 | 35 | – | 4 | .897 |
| No. 11 Stanford | 13 | – | 5 | .722 | 28 | – | 8 | .778 |
| No. 21 Washington State | 11 | – | 7 | .611 | 26 | – | 9 | .743 |
| Arizona State | 9 | – | 9 | .500 | 21 | – | 13 | .618 |
| Oregon | 9 | – | 9 | .500 | 18 | – | 14 | .563 |
| Arizona | 8 | – | 10 | .444 | 19 | – | 15 | .559 |
| Washington | 7 | – | 11 | .389 | 16 | – | 17 | .485 |
| California | 6 | – | 12 | .333 | 17 | – | 16 | .515 |
| Oregon State | 0 | – | 18 | .000 | 6 | – | 25 | .194 |
| USC* | 0 | – | 7 | .000 | 0 | – | 12 | .000 |
† Conference tournament winner As of April 5, 2008; Rankings from AP Poll; *USC vacated 11 conference and 21 overall wins, due to NCAA rules violations.

2007–08 Patriot League men's basketball standings
| | Conf. | | | | Overall |
| Team | W | | L | PCT | W | | L | PCT |
|---|---|---|---|---|---|---|---|---|
| American † | 10 | – | 4 | .714 | 21 | – | 12 | .636 |
| Navy | 9 | – | 5 | .643 | 16 | – | 14 | .533 |
| Colgate | 7 | – | 7 | .500 | 18 | – | 14 | .563 |
| Lehigh | 7 | – | 7 | .500 | 14 | – | 15 | .483 |
| Army | 6 | – | 8 | .429 | 14 | – | 16 | .467 |
| Lafayette | 6 | – | 8 | .429 | 15 | – | 15 | .500 |
| Bucknell | 6 | – | 8 | .429 | 12 | – | 19 | .387 |
| Holy Cross | 5 | – | 9 | .357 | 15 | – | 14 | .517 |
† 2008 Patriot League tournament winner

2007–08 Southeastern Conference men's basketball standings
| | Conf. | | | | Overall |
| Team | W | | L | PCT | W | | L | PCT |
|---|---|---|---|---|---|---|---|---|
East
| No. 5 Tennessee | 14 | – | 2 | .875 | 31 | – | 5 | .861 |
| Kentucky | 12 | – | 4 | .750 | 18 | – | 13 | .581 |
| No. 19 Vanderbilt | 10 | – | 6 | .625 | 26 | – | 8 | .765 |
| Florida | 8 | – | 8 | .500 | 24 | – | 12 | .667 |
| South Carolina | 5 | – | 11 | .313 | 14 | – | 18 | .438 |
| Georgia † | 4 | – | 12 | .250 | 17 | – | 17 | .500 |
West
| Mississippi State | 12 | – | 4 | .750 | 23 | – | 11 | .676 |
| Arkansas | 9 | – | 7 | .563 | 23 | – | 12 | .657 |
| Ole Miss | 7 | – | 9 | .438 | 24 | – | 11 | .686 |
| LSU | 6 | – | 10 | .375 | 13 | – | 18 | .419 |
| Alabama | 5 | – | 11 | .313 | 17 | – | 16 | .515 |
| Auburn | 4 | – | 12 | .250 | 14 | – | 16 | .467 |
† 2008 SEC tournament winner As of April 7, 2008; Rankings from AP Poll

2007–08 Southern Conference men's basketball standings
| | Conf. | | | | Overall |
| Team | W | | L | PCT | W | | L | PCT |
|---|---|---|---|---|---|---|---|---|
North
| Appalachian State | 13 | – | 7 | .650 | 18 | – | 13 | .581 |
| Chattanooga | 13 | – | 7 | .650 | 18 | – | 13 | .581 |
| UNC Greensboro | 12 | – | 8 | .600 | 19 | – | 12 | .613 |
| Elon | 9 | – | 11 | .450 | 14 | – | 19 | .424 |
| Western Carolina | 6 | – | 14 | .300 | 10 | – | 21 | .323 |
South
| No. 23 Davidson† | 20 | – | 0 | 1.000 | 29 | – | 7 | .806 |
| Georgia Southern | 13 | – | 7 | .650 | 20 | – | 12 | .625 |
| College of Charleston | 9 | – | 11 | .450 | 16 | – | 17 | .485 |
| Wofford | 8 | – | 12 | .400 | 16 | – | 16 | .500 |
| Furman | 6 | – | 14 | .300 | 7 | – | 23 | .233 |
| The Citadel | 1 | – | 19 | .050 | 6 | – | 24 | .200 |
† SoCon Tournament winner As of April 30, 2008; Rankings from AP poll

2007–08 Southland Conference men's basketball standings
| | Conf. | | | | Overall |
| Team | W | | L | PCT | W | | L | PCT |
|---|---|---|---|---|---|---|---|---|
East
| Lamar | 13 | – | 3 | .813 | 19 | – | 11 | .633 |
| Southeastern Louisiana | 9 | – | 7 | .563 | 17 | – | 13 | .567 |
| Northwestern State | 9 | – | 7 | .563 | 15 | – | 18 | .455 |
| McNeese State | 7 | – | 9 | .438 | 13 | – | 16 | .448 |
| Nicholls State | 5 | – | 11 | .313 | 10 | – | 21 | .323 |
| Central Arkansas | 4 | – | 12 | .250 | 14 | – | 16 | .467 |
West
| Stephen F. Austin | 13 | – | 3 | .813 | 26 | – | 6 | .813 |
| Sam Houston State | 10 | – | 6 | .625 | 23 | – | 8 | .742 |
| Texas–Arlington † | 7 | – | 9 | .438 | 21 | – | 12 | .636 |
| UTSA | 7 | – | 9 | .438 | 13 | – | 17 | .433 |
| Texas State | 6 | – | 10 | .375 | 13 | – | 16 | .448 |
| Texas A&M–Corpus Christi | 6 | – | 10 | .375 | 9 | – | 20 | .310 |
† 2008 Southland tournament winner Rankings from AP poll

2007–08 SWAC men's basketball standings
| | Conf. | | | | Overall |
| Team | W | | L | PCT | W | | L | PCT |
|---|---|---|---|---|---|---|---|---|
| Alabama State | 15 | – | 3 | .833 | 20 | – | 11 | .645 |
| Mississippi Valley State † | 12 | – | 6 | .667 | 17 | – | 16 | .515 |
| Alabama A&M | 11 | – | 7 | .611 | 14 | – | 15 | .483 |
| Jackson State | 10 | – | 8 | .556 | 14 | – | 20 | .412 |
| Southern | 9 | – | 9 | .500 | 11 | – | 19 | .367 |
| Arkansas–Pine Bluff | 8 | – | 10 | .444 | 13 | – | 18 | .419 |
| Grambling State | 7 | – | 11 | .389 | 7 | – | 19 | .269 |
| Prairie View A&M | 6 | – | 12 | .333 | 8 | – | 22 | .267 |
| Alcorn State | 6 | – | 12 | .333 | 7 | – | 24 | .226 |
| Texas Southern | 6 | – | 12 | .333 | 7 | – | 25 | .219 |
† 2008 SWAC tournament winner Rankings from AP Poll

2007–08 Summit League men's basketball standings
| | Conf. | | | | Overall |
| Team | W | | L | PCT | W | | L | PCT |
|---|---|---|---|---|---|---|---|---|
| Oral Roberts † | 16 | – | 2 | .889 | 24 | – | 9 | .727 |
| IUPUI | 15 | – | 3 | .833 | 26 | – | 7 | .788 |
| Oakland | 11 | – | 7 | .611 | 17 | – | 14 | .548 |
| North Dakota State | 10 | – | 8 | .556 | 16 | – | 13 | .552 |
| Southern Utah | 9 | – | 9 | .500 | 11 | – | 19 | .367 |
| IPFW | 9 | – | 9 | .500 | 13 | – | 18 | .419 |
| Western Illinois | 7 | – | 11 | .389 | 12 | – | 18 | .400 |
| UMKC | 6 | – | 12 | .333 | 11 | – | 21 | .344 |
| Centenary | 4 | – | 14 | .222 | 10 | – | 21 | .323 |
| South Dakota State | 3 | – | 15 | .167 | 8 | – | 21 | .276 |
† 2008 Summit League Tournament winner Rankings from AP Poll

2007–08 Sun Belt Conference men's basketball standings
| | Conf. | | | | Overall |
| Team | W | | L | PCT | W | | L | PCT |
|---|---|---|---|---|---|---|---|---|
East
| South Alabama | 16 | – | 2 | .889 | 26 | – | 7 | .788 |
| Western Kentucky † | 16 | – | 2 | .889 | 29 | – | 7 | .806 |
| Middle Tennessee | 11 | – | 7 | .611 | 17 | – | 15 | .531 |
| Florida Atlantic | 8 | – | 10 | .444 | 15 | – | 18 | .455 |
| Florida International | 6 | – | 12 | .333 | 9 | – | 20 | .310 |
| Troy | 4 | – | 14 | .222 | 12 | – | 19 | .387 |
West
| Arkansas-Little Rock | 11 | – | 7 | .611 | 20 | – | 11 | .645 |
| Louisiana–Lafayette | 11 | – | 7 | .611 | 15 | – | 15 | .500 |
| North Texas | 10 | – | 8 | .556 | 20 | – | 11 | .645 |
| New Orleans | 8 | – | 10 | .444 | 19 | – | 13 | .594 |
| Denver | 7 | – | 11 | .389 | 11 | – | 19 | .367 |
| Arkansas State | 5 | – | 13 | .278 | 10 | – | 20 | .333 |
| Louisiana–Monroe | 4 | – | 14 | .222 | 10 | – | 21 | .323 |
† 2008 Sun Belt Conference tournament winner Rankings from AP Poll

2007–08 WAC men's basketball standings
| | Conf. | | | | Overall |
| Team | W | | L | PCT | W | | L | PCT |
|---|---|---|---|---|---|---|---|---|
| Utah State | 12 | – | 4 | .750 | 24 | – | 11 | .686 |
| Nevada | 12 | – | 4 | .750 | 21 | – | 12 | .636 |
| New Mexico State | 12 | – | 4 | .750 | 21 | – | 14 | .600 |
| Boise State † | 12 | – | 4 | .750 | 25 | – | 9 | .735 |
| Hawaii | 7 | – | 9 | .438 | 11 | – | 19 | .367 |
| Idaho | 5 | – | 11 | .313 | 8 | – | 21 | .276 |
| Fresno State | 5 | – | 11 | .313 | 13 | – | 19 | .406 |
| San Jose State | 4 | – | 12 | .250 | 13 | – | 19 | .406 |
| Louisiana Tech | 3 | – | 13 | .188 | 6 | – | 24 | .200 |
† Conference tournament winner Rankings from AP poll

2007–08 West Coast Conference men's basketball standings
| | Conf. | | | | Overall |
| Team | W | | L | PCT | W | | L | PCT |
|---|---|---|---|---|---|---|---|---|
| No. 20 Gonzaga | 13 | – | 1 | .929 | 25 | – | 8 | .758 |
| Saint Mary's | 12 | – | 2 | .857 | 25 | – | 7 | .781 |
| San Diego † | 11 | – | 3 | .786 | 22 | – | 14 | .611 |
| Santa Clara | 6 | – | 8 | .429 | 15 | – | 16 | .484 |
| San Francisco | 5 | – | 9 | .357 | 10 | – | 21 | .323 |
| Pepperdine | 4 | – | 10 | .286 | 11 | – | 21 | .344 |
| Portland | 3 | – | 11 | .214 | 9 | – | 22 | .290 |
| Loyola Marymount | 2 | – | 12 | .143 | 5 | – | 26 | .161 |
† 2008 WCC tournament winner Rankings from AP Poll

=== Division I independents ===
Nine schools played as Division I independents. Only Chicago State, Longwood, Savannah State, and Texas–Pan American were considered full NCAA Division I schools, as the rest were still in a transition phase from NCAA Division II.

2007–08 NCAA Division I men's basketball independents standings
| | Conf. | | | | Overall |
| Team | W | | L | PCT | W | | L | PCT |
|---|---|---|---|---|---|---|---|---|
| Texas–Pan American | | – | | – | 18 | – | 13 | .581 |
| Utah Valley State | | – | | – | 15 | – | 14 | .517 |
| Savannah State | | – | | – | 13 | – | 18 | .419 |
| Chicago State | | – | | – | 11 | – | 17 | .393 |
| Longwood | | – | | – | 9 | – | 22 | .290 |
| Cal State Bakersfield | | – | | – | 8 | – | 21 | .276 |
| Presbyterian | | – | | – | 5 | – | 25 | .167 |
| North Carolina Central | | – | | – | 4 | – | 26 | .133 |
| NJIT | | – | | – | 0 | – | 29 | .000 |
Rankings from AP Poll

=== Informal championships ===
| Conference | Regular season winner | Most Valuable Player |
|---|---|---|
| Philadelphia Big 5 | Temple & Villanova | Pat Calathes, Saint Joseph's, & Mark Tyndale, Temple |

Temple and Villanova finished with 3–1 records in head-to-head competition among the Philadelphia Big 5.

=== Statistical leaders ===
Source for additional stats categories

| Points per game | | | Rebounds per game | | | Assists per game | | | Steals per game | | |
| Player | School | PPG | Player | School | RPG | Player | School | APG | Player | School | SPG |
| Reggie Williams | VMI | 27.8 | Michael Beasley | Kansas State | 12.4 | Jason Richards | Davidson | 8.1 | Devin Gibson | TX-San Antonio | 3.3 |
| Charron Fisher | Niagara | 27.6 | Jason Thompson | Rider | 12.1 | TeeJay Bannister | Liberty | 7.2 | Devan Downey | South Carolina | 3.2 |
| Michael Beasley | Kansas State | 26.2 | Jon Brockman | Washington | 11.6 | Paul Stoll | TX-Pan American | 7.2 | Chris Gaynor | Winthrop | 2.9 |
| Stephen Curry | Davidson | 25.9 | Durell Vinson | Wagner | 11.5 | Jay Greene | UMBC | 7.2 | Lester Hudson | Tenn.-Martin | 2.8 |
| Lester Hudson | Tenn.-Martin | 25.7 | Marqus Blakely | Vermont | 11.0 | Mike Jefferson | High Point | 7.0 | Tony Lee | Robert Morris | 2.8 |
| | | | Arizona Reid | High Point | 11.0 | | | | | | |

| Blocked shots per game | | | Field goal percentage | | | Three-point FG percentage | | | Free throw percentage | | |
| Player | School | BPG | Player | School | FG% | Player | School | 3FG% | Player | School | FT% |
| Jarvis Varnado | Miss. St. | 4.6 | Kenny George | UNC-Asheville | 69.6 | Jaycee Carroll | Utah St. | 49.8 | Tyler Relph | St. Bonaventure | 93.8 |
| Mickell Gladness | Alabama A&M | 4.5 | Vladimir Kuljanin | UNC-Wilmington | 66.7 | Chad Toppert | New Mexico | 48.0 | Jaycee Carroll | Utah St. | 91.9 |
| Hasheem Thabeet | UConn | 4.5 | Matt Nelson | Boise St. | 64.7 | Shawn Huff | Valparaiso | 47.9 | Jack McClinton | Miami (FL) | 91.9 |
| Kleon Penn | McNeese St. | 4.0 | Ahmad Nivins | St. Joseph's | 64.7 | Darnell Harris | La Salle | 47.9 | Justin Hare | Belmont | 91.8 |
| Shawn James | Duquesne | 4.0 | Will Thomas | George Mason | 64.2 | Henry Salter | TCU | 47.7 | Julio Anthony | E. Illinois | 91.5 |

== Post-season tournaments ==
=== NCAA tournament ===
The NCAA Tournament tipped off on March 18, 2008 with the opening round game in Dayton, Ohio, and concluded on April 7 at the Alamodome in San Antonio, Texas. Of the 65 teams that were invited to participate, 31 were automatic bids while 34 were at-large bids. The 34 at-large teams came from 10 conferences, with the Big East tying its own 2006 record with eight bids. Three other conferences, the Big 12, Pacific-10 Conference, and Southeastern Conference, had six teams invited to the tournament. Notably absent from the field were Florida and Ohio State, the champions and runners-up of the 2007 tournament, the first time that both teams from a previous year's finals failed to make the tournament since 1980. Kansas defeated Memphis, 75–68 in overtime to win their third NCAA Tournament championship, and Jayhawks guard Mario Chalmers was named the tournament's Most Outstanding Player.

==== Final Four – Alamodome, San Antonio, Texas ====
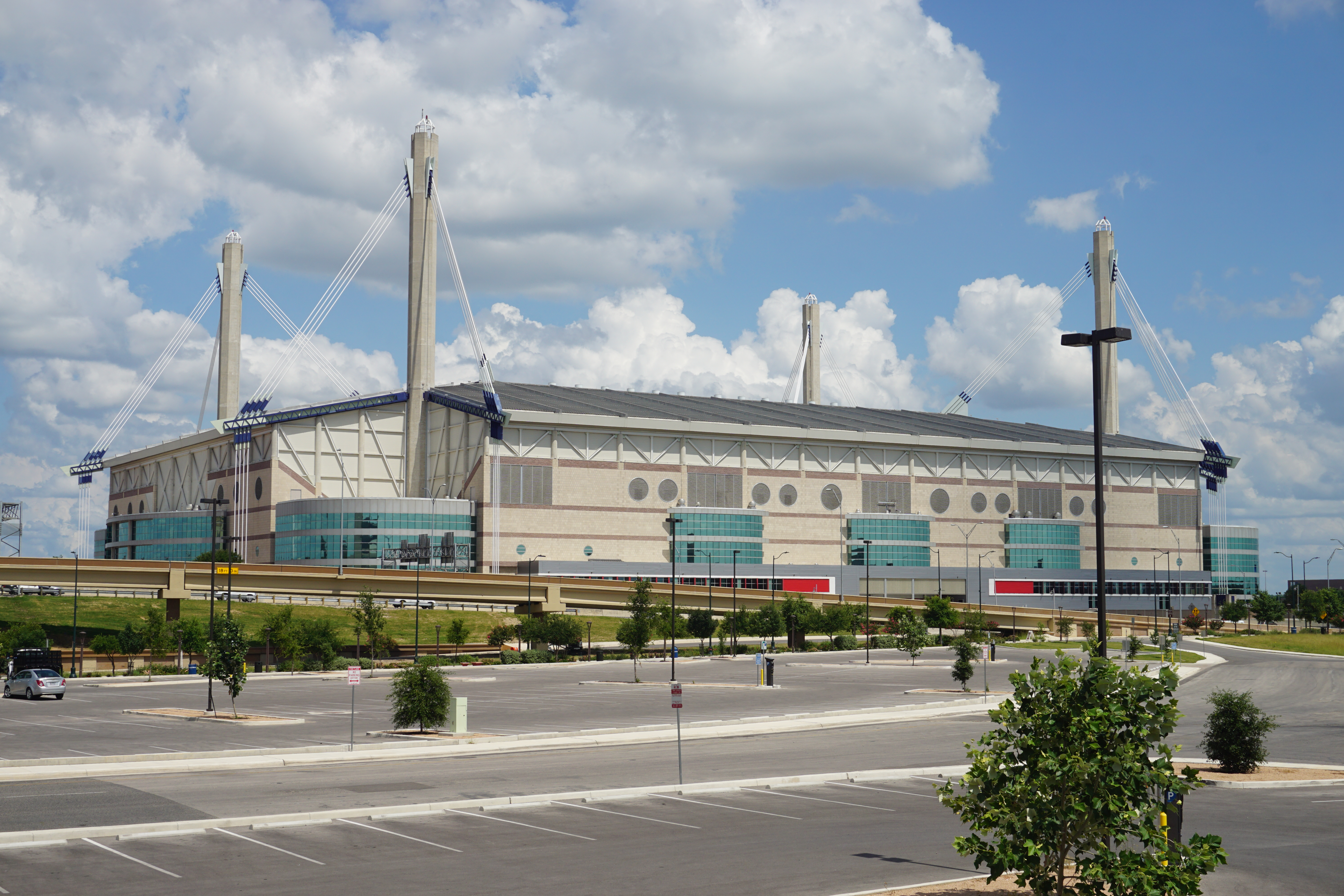
The Alamodome in San Antonio, Texas was the site of the season-ending Final Four and Championship game for 2007-08.

National semifinals April 5
E1 | North Carolina | 66
M1 | Kansas | 84
S1 | Memphis | 78
W1 | UCLA | 63

National championship game April 7
M1 | Kansas | 75*
S1 | Memphis | 68

=== National Invitation tournament ===
After the NCAA Tournament field was announced, the National Invitation Tournament invited teams to participate. Eight teams were given automatic bids for winning their conference regular seasons, and 24 other teams were also invited. The field came from 10 conferences, with the Atlantic 10 having the most teams invited with four. The Atlantic Coast and Missouri Valley Conferences each had three bids, and five other conferences placed two teams in the tournament. Last year's NCAA finalists, Ohio State and Florida both made the semifinals, with the Buckeyes winning the tournament, defeating UMass 92–85 in the final. Ohio State center Kosta Koufos was named tournament MVP.

==== NIT semifinals and final ====
Played at Madison Square Garden in New York City on April 1 and 3

Semifinals
1 | Ohio State | 81
2 | Mississippi | 69
2 | Florida | 66
2 | UMass | 78

Final
1 | Ohio State | 92
2 | UMass | 85

=== College Basketball Invitational ===
The inaugural College Basketball Invitational (CBI) Tournament was held starting March 18 and ended with a best-of-three final which saw Tulsa defeat Bradley for the championship. Jerome Jordan of Tulsa was named tournament MVP.

Semifinals (Reseeded)
1 | Virginia | 85
4 | Bradley | 96
2 | Tulsa | 73
3 | Houston | 69

Finals (Best of three)
4 | Bradley | 68 | 83 | 64
2 | Tulsa | 73 | 74 | 70

== Major upsets ==
=== Regular season and conference tournaments ===
- Oakland 68, Oregon 62
- Gardner-Webb 84, Kentucky 68
- Robert Morris 57, Boston College 51
- Winthrop 76, Miami (FL) 71
- Dayton 80, Pittsburgh 55
- Maryland 82, North Carolina 80
- Kentucky 72, Tennessee 66
- Wake Forest 86, Duke 73
- Washington 71, UCLA 61

=== NCAA tournament ===
- #13 San Diego 70, #4 Connecticut 69 (OT)
- #13 Siena 83, #4 Vanderbilt 64
- #10 Davidson 74, #2 Georgetown 70
- #10 Davidson 73, #3 Wisconsin 56
- #12 Western Kentucky 101, #5 Drake 99 (OT)

== Award winners ==
=== Consensus All-American teams ===
Consensus First Team
| Player | Position | Class | Team |
|---|---|---|---|
| D. J. Augustin | G | Sophomore | Texas |
| Michael Beasley | F | Freshman | Kansas State |
| Chris Douglas-Roberts | G-F | Junior | Memphis |
| Tyler Hansbrough | C | Junior | North Carolina |
| Kevin Love | C | Freshman | UCLA |

Consensus Second Team
| Player | Position | Class | Team |
|---|---|---|---|
| Stephen Curry | G | Sophomore | Davidson |
| Shan Foster | G-F | Senior | Vanderbilt |
| Luke Harangody | F | Sophomore | Notre Dame |
| Roy Hibbert | C | Senior | Georgetown |
| Chris Lofton | G | Senior | Tennessee |
| D. J. White | F-C | Senior | Indiana |

=== Major player of the year awards ===
- Wooden Award: Tyler Hansbrough, North Carolina
- Naismith Award: Tyler Hansbrough, North Carolina
- Associated Press Player of the Year: Tyler Hansbrough, North Carolina
- NABC Player of the Year: Tyler Hansbrough, North Carolina
- Oscar Robertson Trophy (USBWA): Tyler Hansbrough, North Carolina
- Adolph Rupp Trophy: Tyler Hansbrough, North Carolina
- CBS/Chevrolet Player of the Year: Tyler Hansbrough, North Carolina
- Sporting News Player of the Year: Tyler Hansbrough, North Carolina

=== Major freshman of the year awards ===
- USBWA Freshman of the Year: Michael Beasley, Kansas State
- Sporting News Freshman of the Year: Michael Beasley, Kansas State

=== Major coach of the year awards ===
- Associated Press Coach of the Year: Keno Davis, Drake
- Henry Iba Award (USBWA): Keno Davis, Drake
- NABC Coach of the Year: Bob McKillop, Davidson
- Naismith College Coach of the Year: John Calipari, Memphis
- CBS/Chevrolet Coach of the Year: Keno Davis, Drake
- Adolph Rupp Cup: Bruce Pearl, Tennessee
- Sporting News Coach of the Year: Keno Davis, Drake

=== Other major awards ===
- Bob Cousy Award (Best point guard): D. J. Augustin, Texas
- Pete Newell Big Man Award (Best big man): Michael Beasley, Kansas State
- NABC Defensive Player of the Year: Hasheem Thabeet, Connecticut
- Frances Pomeroy Naismith Award (Best player under 6'0): Mike Green, Butler
- Lowe's Senior CLASS Award (top senior): Shan Foster, Vanderbilt
- Robert V. Geasey Trophy (Top player in Philadelphia Big 5): Pat Calathes, St. Joseph's and Mark Tyndale, Temple (Co-MVPs)
- NIT/Haggerty Award (Top player in New York City metro area): Jason Thompson, Rider
- Chip Hilton Player of the Year Award (Strong personal character): Mike Green, Butler

== Coaching changes ==
A number of teams changed coaches during the season and after it ended.

| Team | Former Coach | Interim Coach | New Coach | Reason |
|---|---|---|---|---|
| Alcorn State | Samuel West | | Larry Smith | West was fired after a 7–23 season, former Alcorn State star and ex-NBA player Smith was hired |
| Arizona | Lute Olson | Kevin O'Neill | Lute Olson | Olsen took a leave of absence due to a divorce; but announced he would return in 2008–09. O'Neill left following season. However, Olson would ultimately retire on October 23, 2008, before the 2008–09 season; several days later, Olson revealed (through his personal physician) that he had suffered a stroke during the season. |
| Arkansas-Pine Bluff | Van Holt | | George Ivory | Holt resigned after going 50–124 in six years. |
| Arkansas State | Dickey Nutt | Shawn Forest; Al Grushkin | John Brady | Nutt resigned three wins shy of becoming the Red Wolves' winningest coach. Coincidentally, his resignation came shortly after his brother, Houston Nutt, was forced out as football coach of the Arkansas Razorbacks. |
| Brown | Craig Robinson | | Jesse Agel | Robinson left to take the Oregon State job |
| Bucknell | Pat Flannery | | Dave Paulsen | Flannery retires as coach. |
| California | Ben Braun | | Mike Montgomery | Montgomery goes across the bay from Stanford, where he coached before going to the Golden State Warriors. |
| Centenary | Rob Flaska | | Greg Gary | |
| Detroit | Perry Watson | Kevin Mondro | Ray McCallum | Retired after taking a medical leave of absence during the season. |
| Drake | Keno Davis | | Mark Phelps | Davis left to take the Providence job. Phelps was an assistant at Arizona State. |
| Florida Atlantic | Rex Walters | | Mike Jarvis | Walters left for San Francisco, while Jarvis comes back after a self-imposed retitrement. |
| Grambling | Larry Wright | | Rick Duckett | |
| Idaho | George Pfeifer | | Don Verlin | Pfeifer was fired following a 12–48 record in two years. |
| Indiana | Kelvin Sampson | Dan Dakich | Tom Crean | Sampson was embroiled in a cell phone controversy. |
| James Madison | Dean Keener | | Matt Brady | |
| Kent State | Jim Christian | | Geno Ford | Ford replaces Christian, who went to TCU. |
| LSU | John Brady | Butch Pierre | Trent Johnson | Brady was fired in midst of disappointing season, two years after guiding LSU to the Final Four. |
| Loyola Marymount | Rodney Tention | | Bill Bayno | |
| Marist | Matt Brady | | Chuck Martin | Brady left to go to JMU. Martin takes his first head coaching job after serving as an assistant at Memphis. |
| Marquette | Tom Crean | | Buzz Williams | Crean resigned to take Indiana job; ex-University of New Orleans coach takes over after serving as an assistant. |
| UMass | Travis Ford | | Derek Kellogg | Ford left for the Oklahoma State job. UMass alum Kellogg was hired off of ex-Minutemen coach John Calipari's staff at Memphis. |
| Mercer | Mark Slonaker | | Bob Hoffman | |
| Missouri State | Barry Hinson | | Cuonzo Martin | |
| NJIT | Jim Casciano | | Jim Engles | Team in first year of D-I hoops went 5-24 |
| Oklahoma State | Sean Sutton | | Travis Ford | Son of Eddie Sutton resigned. |
| Oregon State | Jay John | Kevin Mouton | Craig Robinson | John was fired in midst of horrid season. The brother-in-law of Barack Obama comes in from Brown as permanent coach. |
| Pepperdine | Vance Walberg | Eric Bridgeland | Tom Asbury | Walberg resigned mid-season with 12–48 overall mark. Former Waves head coach Asbury returned to take the position. |
| Providence | Tim Welsh | | Keno Davis | |
| Rice | Willis Wilson | | Ben Braun | After firing at Cal, Braun comes to C-USA. |
| Sacramento State | Jerome Jenkins | | Brian Katz | |
| San Francisco | Jessie Evans | Eddie Sutton | Rex Walters | Sutton won his 800th game this year, coming out of retirement for an interim stint. |
| South Carolina | Dave Odom | | Darrin Horn | Odom retired after the season. |
| Stanford | Trent Johnson | | Johnny Dawkins | Johnson leaves Stanford to take the job at LSU. Duke associate head coach Dawkins takes his first head coaching job. |
| TCU | Neil Dougherty | | Jim Christian | |
| Texas Tech | Bob Knight | Pat Knight | Pat Knight | Winningest coach in D-I resigned, son Pat took over. |
| Toledo | Stan Joplin | | Gene Cross | |
| Western Illinois | Derek Thomas | | Jim Molinari | |
| Western Kentucky | Darrin Horn | | Ken McDonald | Horn goes to South Carolina. |
