= 2008 NCAA Men's Basketball All-Americans =

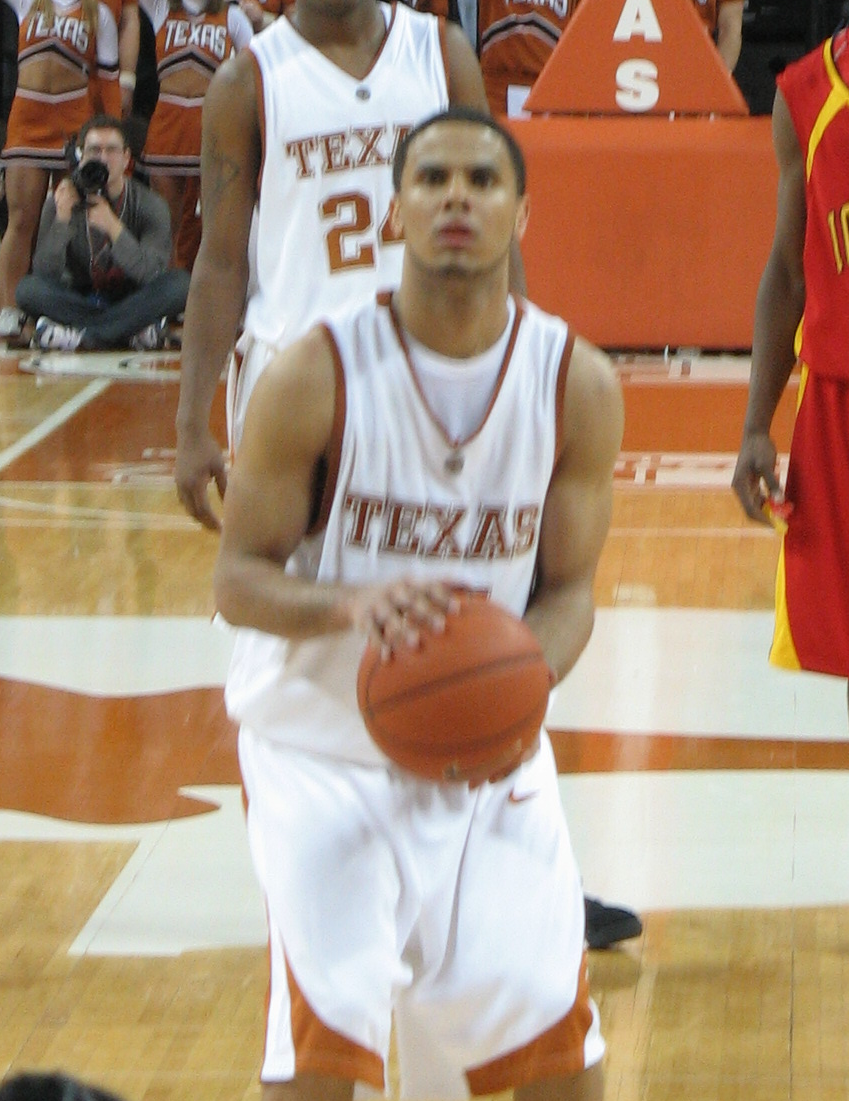
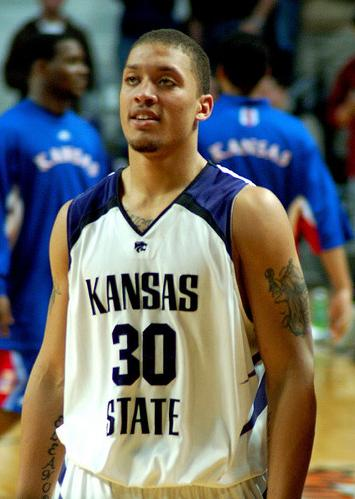
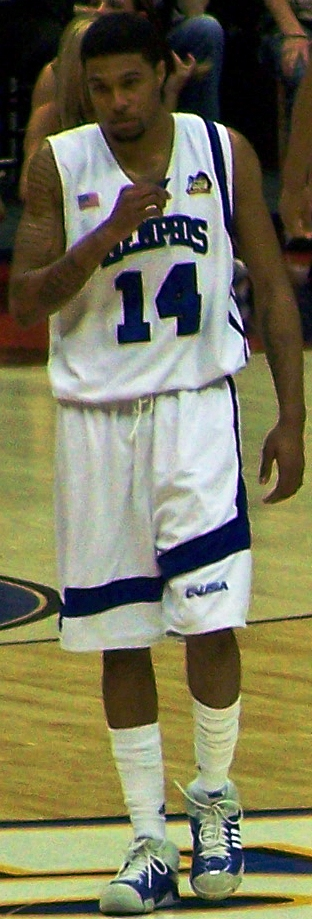
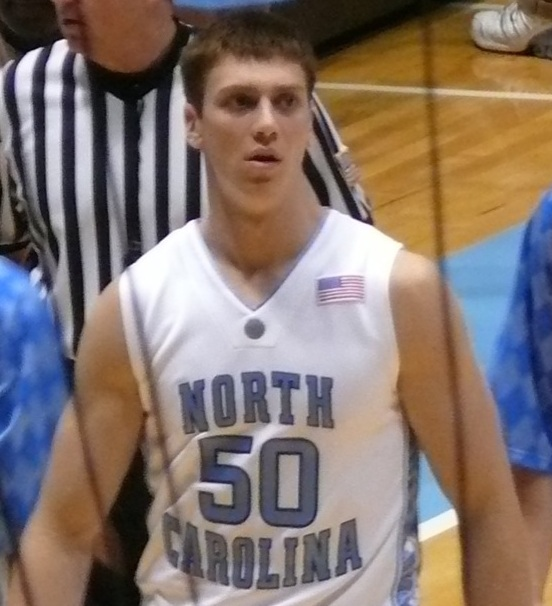
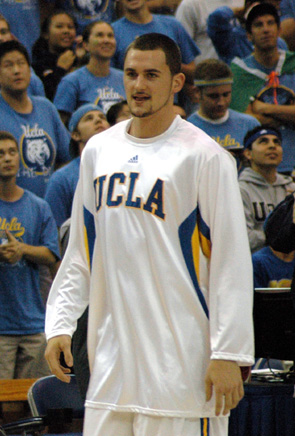
- The 2008 consensus first team. Clockwise from top left: Augustin, Beasley, Douglas-Roberts, Love, Hansbrough.
- Awarded for: 2007–08 NCAA Division I men's basketball season

The Consensus 2008 College Basketball All-American team, as determined by aggregating the results of four major All-American teams. To earn "consensus" status, a player must win honors from a majority of the following teams: the Associated Press, the USBWA, The Sporting News and the National Association of Basketball Coaches.

== 2008 Consensus All-America team ==
The following players were consensus All-Americans.

Consensus First Team
Player	Position	Class	Team
D. J. Augustin	G	Sophomore	Texas
Michael Beasley	F	Freshman	Kansas State
Chris Douglas-Roberts	G-F	Junior	Memphis
Tyler Hansbrough	C	Junior	North Carolina
Kevin Love	C	Freshman	UCLA

Consensus Second Team
Player	Position	Class	Team
Stephen Curry	G	Sophomore	Davidson
Shan Foster	G-F	Senior	Vanderbilt
Luke Harangody	F	Sophomore	Notre Dame
Roy Hibbert	C	Senior	Georgetown
Chris Lofton	G	Senior	Tennessee
D. J. White	F-C	Senior	Indiana

== Individual All-America teams ==
All-America Team
All-America Team	First team		Second team		Third team	
All-America Team	Player	School	Player	School	Player	School
Associated Press	D. J. Augustin	Texas	Stephen Curry	Davidson	Darren Collison	UCLA
Associated Press	Michael Beasley	Kansas State	Shan Foster	Vanderbilt	Eric Gordon	Indiana
Associated Press	Chris Douglas-Roberts	Memphis	Luke Harangody	Notre Dame	Chris Lofton	Tennessee
Associated Press	Tyler Hansbrough	North Carolina	Roy Hibbert	Georgetown	Brook Lopez	Stanford
Associated Press	Kevin Love	UCLA	D. J. White	Indiana	Derrick Rose	Memphis
USBWA	D. J. Augustin	Texas	Shan Foster	Vanderbilt	No third team	
USBWA	Michael Beasley	Kansas State	Luke Harangody	Notre Dame	No third team	
USBWA	Chris Douglas-Roberts	Memphis	Chris Lofton	Tennessee	No third team	
USBWA	Tyler Hansbrough	North Carolina	A. J. Price	Connecticut	No third team	
USBWA	Kevin Love	UCLA	D. J. White	Indiana	No third team	
NABC	D. J. Augustin	Texas	Eric Gordon	Indiana	Shan Foster	Vanderbilt
NABC	Michael Beasley	Kansas State	Roy Hibbert	Georgetown	Brook Lopez	Stanford
NABC	Chris Douglas-Roberts	Memphis	Chris Lofton	Tennessee	DeMarcus Nelson	Duke
NABC	Tyler Hansbrough	North Carolina	Kevin Love	UCLA	Derrick Rose	Memphis
NABC	Luke Harangody	Notre Dame	D. J. White	Indiana	Brandon Rush	Kansas
Sporting News	D. J. Augustin	Texas	Ryan Anderson	California	No third team	
Sporting News	Michael Beasley	Kansas State	Stephen Curry	Davidson	No third team	
Sporting News	Chris Douglas-Roberts	Memphis	Shan Foster	Vanderbilt	No third team	
Sporting News	Tyler Hansbrough	North Carolina	Luke Harangody	Notre Dame	No third team	
Sporting News	Kevin Love	UCLA	D. J. White	Indiana	No third team	

AP Honorable Mention:

- Joe Alexander, West Virginia
- Josh Alexander, Stephen F. Austin
- Ryan Anderson, California
- Darrell Arthur, Kansas
- Jerryd Bayless, Arizona
- Marqus Blakely, Vermont
- Jon Brockman, Washington
- Chase Budinger, Arizona
- Jaycee Carroll, Utah State
- Mario Chalmers, Kansas
- Lee Cummard, BYU
- Scott Cutley, Cal State Fullerton
- Louis Dale, Cornell
- Jeremiah Dominguez, Portland State
- Wayne Ellington, North Carolina
- Adam Emmenecker, Drake
- Al Fisher, Kent State
- Gary Forbes, Massachusetts
- J. R. Giddens, New Mexico
- Jamont Gordon, Mississippi State
- Mike Green, Butler
- James Harden, Arizona State
- Alex Harris, UC Santa Barbara
- Andrew Hayles, Alabama State
- Richard Hendrix, Alabama
- George Hill, IUPUI
- Lester Hudson, Tennessee-Martin
- Ty Lawson, North Carolina
- Courtney Lee, Western Kentucky
- Tony Lee, Robert Morris
- Eric Maynor, VCU
- O. J. Mayo, USC
- Drew Neitzel, Michigan State
- DeMarcus Nelson, Duke
- David Padgett, Louisville
- Jeremy Pargo, Gonzaga
- A. J. Price, Connecticut
- Arizona Reid, High Point
- Tyrese Rice, Boston College
- Brandon Rush, Kansas
- Thomas Sanders, Gardner-Webb
- Sean Singletary, Virginia
- Jamar Smith, Morgan State
- Tyler Smith, Tennessee
- Greg Sprink, Navy
- Jason Thompson, Rider
- Sam Young, Pittsburgh

== Academic All-Americans ==
On February 26, 2008, CoSIDA and ESPN The Magazine announced the 2009 Academic All-American team with Adam Emmenecker headlining the University Division as the men's college basketball Academic All-American of the Year.

2007–08 ESPN The Magazine Academic All-America Men’s Basketball Team (University Division) as selected by CoSIDA:

First Team
Player	School	Class	GPA/Major
D. J. Augustin	Texas	Sophomore	3.64/ Education
Adam Emmenecker	Drake	Senior	3.97/ Business and Finance
Justin Hare	Belmont	Senior	3.87/ Exercise Science, Pre-Med
Jack Leasure	Coastal Carolina	Senior	3.82/ History
Brett Winkelman	North Dakota State	Junior	3.84/ Industrial engineering & Management

Second Team
Player	School	Class	GPA/Major
A. J. Graves	Butler	Senior	3.35/ Actuarial Science
Bryan Mullins	Southern Illinois	Junior	4.00/ Finance
Drew Neitzel	Michigan State	Senior	3.27/ Interdisciplinary Studies
Joe Reitz	Western Michigan	Senior	3.72/ Finance
Michael Schachtner	Wisconsin-Green Bay	Junior	3.81/ Psychology

Third Team
Player	School	Class	GPA/Major
Ryan Bright	Sam Houston State	Senior	3.59/ Political science
Matt Nelson	Boise State	Senior	3.52/ Business
Greg Paulus	Duke	Junior	3.30/ Political Science
Alex Ruoff	West Virginia	Junior	3.79/ History
Drew Streicher	Butler	Graduate	3.95/ Chemistry, MBA
