= 2007–08 Drake Bulldogs men's basketball team =

American college basketball season

2007–08 Drake Bulldogs men's basketball

MVC Regular Season Champions MVC Tournament Champions

NCAA 1st Round vs. Western Kentucky, L, 99–101
- Conference: Missouri Valley Conference

Ranking
- Coaches: No. 23
- AP: No. 14
- Record: 28–5 (15–3 MVC)
- Head coach: Keno Davis
- Assistant coaches: Chris Davis; Rodell Davis; Justin Ohl
- Home arena: Knapp Center

2007–08 Missouri Valley Conference men's basketball standings
| | Conf. | | | | Overall |
| Team | W | | L | PCT | W | | L | PCT |
|---|---|---|---|---|---|---|---|---|
| No. 14 Drake † | 15 | – | 3 | .833 | 28 | – | 5 | .848 |
| Illinois State | 13 | – | 5 | .722 | 25 | – | 10 | .714 |
| Southern Illinois | 11 | – | 7 | .611 | 18 | – | 15 | .545 |
| Creighton | 10 | – | 8 | .556 | 22 | – | 11 | .667 |
| Bradley | 9 | – | 9 | .500 | 21 | – | 17 | .553 |
| Northern Iowa | 9 | – | 9 | .500 | 18 | – | 14 | .563 |
| Missouri State | 8 | – | 10 | .444 | 17 | – | 16 | .515 |
| Indiana State | 8 | – | 10 | .444 | 15 | – | 16 | .484 |
| Wichita State | 4 | – | 14 | .222 | 11 | – | 20 | .355 |
| Evansville | 3 | – | 15 | .167 | 9 | – | 21 | .300 |
† 2008 MVC tournament winner Rankings from AP Poll

The 2007–08 Drake Bulldogs men's basketball team represented Drake University in the 2007–08 college basketball season. The team was led by first-year head coach Keno Davis. In 2006–07, the Bulldogs finished 17–15 (6–10 in the Missouri Valley Conference). Drake improved upon their first winning season since the 1986–1987 season, making their first NCAA tournament appearance since their run to the Elite Eight in 1971 and their first postseason appearance since their National Invitational tournament appearance in 1986.

== Preseason ==
The preseason Missouri Valley Conference Coaches' Poll picked the Bulldogs to finish ninth. No Drake players were voted to the preseason first or second teams. It is also noteworthy that Drake only returned one starter from the 2006–07 team that won 17 games, namely shooting guard Josh Young.

Drake's starters were so lightly regarded on paper that ESPN.com reporter Adam Rittenberg remarked just before the 2008 NCAA tournament that they "not long ago looked better suited for the scout team than the starting lineup":

- Point guard Adam Emmenecker was a three-year walk-on who only received a scholarship two days before his senior season, and had career totals of 64 assists and 57 points entering the 2007–08 season.
- Power forward Jonathan "Bucky" Cox was, like Emmenecker, a former walk-on.
- Shooting guard Leonard Houston was a three-year reserve who had 193 career points entering the season.
- Small forward Klayton Korver missed the 2005–06 season after microfracture knee surgery; while he came back to be a starter at the beginning of the 2006–07 season, he had lost his starting job by season's end.
- Even returning starter Josh Young was not highly regarded coming out of high school; all of his 30 scholarship offers were from mid-majors.

== Regular season ==
On November 9 and 10, Drake competed in the Saint Mary's Tip-Off Classic. They defeated UC San Diego and lost to Saint Mary's College in the championship game. On December 1, 2007, Drake won the Iowa Realty Invitational with victories over North Carolina Central and Duquesne. On December 8, 2007, Drake won the Drake Regency Classic with victories over Chicago State and Texas-Pan American. On December 14, 2007, Drake broke a 20-year winless streak at Iowa with a 56–51 victory. With the victory Drake improved to 9–1 for the first time since the 1979–80 season. On December 17, 2007, Drake received 6 points in the AP Top 25 poll. That had them ranked T-37th in the nation. The last time Drake was ranked was March 16, 1971. On December 24, 2007, Drake received 3 points in the AP Top 25 poll. That had them ranked T-40th. On December 30, 2007, Drake's RPI rating was 19th in the nation. On December 31, 2007, Drake received 8 points in the AP Top 25 poll. That had them ranked T-35th.

On January 2, 2007, Drake won its first game against Southern Illinois since February 17, 1999. Their 11–1 record tied the best start in school history set by the 1969–70 team. It was the first 2–0 start by the Bulldogs in the MVC since the 1995–96 season. With the Bulldogs' 71–68 win over Evansville on January 6, 2008, they set a new Drake record for the best start in school history with a 12–1 mark. They were 3–0 in the MVC for the first time since the 1982–83 season. On January 7, 2008, Drake received its first vote of the year in the USA Today/ESPN Top 25 coaches poll. They also received a season-high 22 points in the AP Top 25 poll with a ranking of T-31.

With Drake's victory over Indiana State on January 9, 2008, Drake started 4–0 in the MVC for the first time since 1970. On January 10, 2008, Drake's RPI rating was 15th in the nation. On January 12, 2008, Drake won their first game against Missouri State after losing the last 10 games. They also set a school record with a 14–1 mark for the best start in school history. As of before the day's game, Drake's RPI was 11th in the nation. On January 14, 2008, Drake received 17 points in the USA Today/ESPN Top 25 coaches poll which had them ranked 30th. They also were ranked 26th in the AP Top 25 poll with 75 points.

On January 19, 2008, Drake improved their record to 16–1 with a victory over Illinois State in what was the first meeting between two teams with 6–0 conference records in Missouri Valley Conference play. On January 21, 2008, Drake received 92 points in the USA Today/ESPN Top 25 coaches poll which had them ranked 23rd. They also were ranked 22nd in the AP Top 25 poll with 313 points. It was the first time Drake had been ranked since they were ranked 16th in the AP Top 20 poll in March 1975. On January 25, 2008, Drake was ranked 9th in RPI ratings. On January 28, 2008, Drake received 220 points in the USA Today/ESPN Top 25 coaches poll, which had them ranked 17th. They also were ranked 16th in the AP Top 25 poll with 616 points. On January 30, 2008, with the Drake win over Creighton and Kansas' loss to Kansas State, Drake held the 2nd longest winning streak in the nation at 18 wins in a row. They were second only to Memphis' 20 consecutive wins. On February 2, 2008, Drake won 20 games in a season for the first time since the 1970–71 season. On February 4, 2008, Drake received 334 points in the USA Today/ESPN Top 25 coaches poll, which had them ranked 15th. They also were ranked 15th in the AP Top 25 poll with 817 points. On February 9, 2008, Drake extended their winning streak to 21 games. On February 11, 2008, Drake received 361 points in the USA Today/ESPN Top 25 coaches poll which had them ranked 15th. They also were ranked 14th in the AP Top 25 poll with 863 points.

On February 16, 2008, Drake won the Missouri Valley Conference regular season championship for the first time since the 1970–71 season. Also with the win they now held the second most wins in Drake history with 23, with the school record being 26 by the 1968–69 team. On February 18, 2008, Drake received 243 points in the USA Today/ESPN Top 25 coaches poll which had them ranked 18th. They also were ranked 16th in the AP Top 25 poll with 612 points. On February 23, 2008, with Drake's 71–64 win over No. 8 Butler, they claimed their first win over a top-10 team since a 56–55 home victory over No. 7 Tulsa on February 15, 1982. On February 25, 2008, Drake received 259 points in the USA Today/ESPN Top 25 coaches poll which had them ranked 20th. They also were ranked 20th in the AP Top 25 poll with 621 points.

On March 1, 2008, with Drake's win over Wichita State, Drake won its most games ever in the Missouri Valley Conference with 15. On March 3, 2008 Drake received 116 points in the USA Today/ESPN Top 25 coaches poll which had them ranked 21st. They also were ranked 20th in the AP Top 25 poll with 346 points. The ranking marked the 7th consecutive week Drake was ranked in the AP and Coaches polls. This tied the Drake record set by the 1969–1970 team set from January 27, 1970, through March 10, 1970. This was also the first time a Missouri Valley Conference team had been ranked for seven consecutive weeks since Creighton was ranked during the 2002–2003 season.

On March 10, 2008, Drake received 235 points in the USA Today/ESPN Top 25 coaches poll which had them ranked 18th. They also were ranked 16th in the AP Top 25 poll with 672 points. On March 18, 2008, Drake received 310 points in the USA Today/ESPN Top 25 coaches poll which had them ranked 14th. They also were ranked 14th in the AP Top 25 poll with 794 points. On April 7, 2008, Drake received 117 points in the USA Today/ESPN Top 25 coaches poll which had them ranked 23rd.

== Postseason ==
On March 7, 2008 Drake tied the school record for most wins in a season, set by the 1968–1969 team, with their 26th win over Indiana State in the Missouri Valley Conference tournament. On March 8, 2008 Drake set a new school record for wins in a season with its semifinal victory over 4th seeded Creighton. The victory also earned them their first Missouri Valley Conference tournament appearance. On March 9, 2008 Drake won their first ever Missouri Valley Conference tournament with a 79–49 victory over Illinois State. With the win they also clinched their first NCAA Tournament appearance since the 1970–1971 season.

The Bulldogs were well represented on the MVC postseason honors list:

- Emmenecker was named the league's MVP. The official conference press release announcing him as MVP called him "perhaps the most improbable MVC Player of the Year (based on pre-season expectations) in league history." In 2007–08, he set a single-season school record with 177 assists in the regular season (since extended to 213), and his average of 6.1 per game led the MVC. He started every game for the Bulldogs after making only two starts in his previous three seasons, and his regular-season totals in assists, points (223), and rebounds (129) more than doubled his previous career totals in all three categories.
- Young also made the All-MVC first team.
- Cox and Houston made the All-MVC second team.
- Emmenecker, Cox, and Houston were all named to the MVC Most Improved Team, with Emmenecker selected as captain.
- Emmenecker, who carried a 3.97 grade point average in a four-major academic program going into his final academic term at Drake, was also named MVC Scholar-Athlete of the Year.
- Keno Davis was named MVC Coach of the Year.

In the 2008 NCAA tournament 5th-seeded Drake took on the 12th-seeded Western Kentucky Hilltoppers. After overcoming a 16-point deficit in the last 8 minutes of the game to send the game into overtime, the Bulldogs lost 101–99 on Ty Rogers' desperation 26-foot 3-pointer as time expired.

== Roster ==
2007–08 Drake Bulldogs men's basketball team
Players
Coaches

| Pos. | # | Name | Height | Weight | Year | Previous school | Hometown |
|---|---|---|---|---|---|---|---|
| F | 2 | Alex White | 6 ft 6 in (1.98 m) | 235 lb (107 kg) | Jr | Rio Grande High School; Cochise College | Albuquerque, NM |
| F | 4 | Brent Heemskerk | 6 ft 8 in (2.03 m) | 225 lb (102 kg) | Jr | Christian High School | Grand Rapids, MI |
| G | 5 | Leonard Houston | 6 ft 3 in (1.91 m) | 175 lb (79 kg) | Sr | West Ottawa High School | Holland, MI |
| G | 11 | Jacob Baryenbruch | 6 ft 0 in (1.83 m) | 170 lb (77 kg) | Jr | River Valley High School | Spring Green, WI |
| G | 13 | Kit Avery | 6 ft 2 in (1.88 m) | 185 lb (84 kg) | RS Fr | Southwest Christian High School | Deephaven, MN |
| G | 15 | Adam Emmenecker | 6 ft 1 in (1.85 m) | 189 lb (86 kg) | Sr | Arthur Hill High School | Saginaw, MI |
| G | 20 | Josh Young | 6 ft 1 in (1.85 m) | 170 lb (77 kg) | So | Lawton Christian High School | Lawton, OK |
| F | 22 | Bill Eaddy | 6 ft 5 in (1.96 m) | 215 lb (98 kg) | So | Massanutten Military Academy | Ypsilanti, MI |
| G | 23 | Josh Parker | 6 ft 0 in (1.83 m) | 165 lb (75 kg) | Fr | Thornton High School | Harvey, IL |
| F | 24 | Klayton Korver | 6 ft 5 in (1.96 m) | 210 lb (95 kg) | Sr | Pella High School | Pella, IA |
| F | 31 | Jonathan "Bucky" Cox | 6 ft 5 in (1.96 m) | 225 lb (102 kg) | Jr | Barrington High School | Barrington, IL |
| G | 32 | Ryan Daniels | 6 ft 1 in (1.85 m) | 165 lb (75 kg) | So | LaCueva High School; Butler Community College | Albuquerque, NM |
| G | 34 | Tyson "Dirty" Dirks | 6 ft 2 in (1.88 m) | 185 lb (84 kg) | Fr | Gladbrook Reinbeck High School | Reinbeck, IA |
| F | 41 | Brett Spiker | 6 ft 6 in (1.98 m) | 205 lb (93 kg) | Jr | Chariton High School; Peru State College | Chariton, IA |
| G/F | 44 | Adam Templeton | 6 ft 5 in (1.96 m) | 225 lb (102 kg) | Jr | Central High School; University of California, Irvine | Rapid City, SD |
| G | 50 | John Michael Hall | 6 ft 5 in (1.96 m) | 205 lb (93 kg) | Jr | Colquitt County High School; Abraham Baldwin College | Moultrie, GA |

Head coach

- Keno Davis (Iowa)

Assistant coach(es)

- Chris Davis (Michigan)
- Rodell Davis (Iowa)
- Justin Ohl (Drake)

Legend

- (C) Team captain
- (S) Suspended
- (I) Ineligible
- (W) Walk-on
- Injured
- Current redshirt

== Missouri Valley Conference standings ==
| # | Team | Conference | Pct. | Overall | Pct. |
|---|---|---|---|---|---|
| 1 | Drake | 15–3 | .833 | 28–5 | .848 |
| 2 | Illinois State | 13–5 | .722 | 25–10 | .714 |
| 3 | Southern Illinois | 11–7 | .611 | 18–15 | .545 |
| 4 | Creighton | 10–8 | .556 | 23–11 | .676 |
| 5 | Bradley | 9–9 | .500 | 20–17 | .541 |
| 6 | Northern Iowa | 9–9 | .500 | 18–14 | .563 |
| 7 | Missouri State | 8–10 | .444 | 17–16 | .515 |
| 8 | Indiana State | 8–10 | .444 | 15–16 | .484 |
| 9 | Wichita State | 4–14 | .222 | 11–20 | .355 |
| 10 | Evansville | 3–15 | .167 | 9–21 | .300 |

== Leaders ==
- Minutes: Adam Emmenecker 1093
- MPG: Adam Emmenecker 33.1
- Points: Josh Young 477
- PPG: Josh Young 15.9
- Rebounds: Jonathan Cox 282
- RPG: Jonathan Cox 8.5
- Field Goals: Leonard Houston 156
- FG%: Brent Heemskerk .690
- 3FG: Josh Young 86
- 3FG%: Bill Eaddy .750
- Assists: Adam Emmenecker 213
- APG: Adam Emmenecker 6.5
- Blocks: Jonathan Cox 3
- BPG: Jonathan Cox 1.0
- Steals: Adam Emmenecker 53
- SPG: Adam Emmenecker 1.6
- Free Throws: Adam Emmenecker 125
- FT%: Klayton Korver .860
- Making Babies: Alex White 1

== Player statistics ==
Note: GP= Games played; MPG= Minutes per Game; SPG= Steals per Game; RPG = Rebounds per Game; APG. = Assists per Game; BPG = Blocks per Game; PPG = Points per Game

| Player | GP | MPG | SPG | RPG | APG | BPG | PPG |
|---|---|---|---|---|---|---|---|
| Kit Avery | 8 | 1.6 | 0.0 | 0.5 | 0.3 | 0.0 | 0.0 |
| Jacob Baryenbruch | 33 | 10.4 | 0.1 | 0.6 | 0.8 | 0.0 | 2.2 |
| Jonathan Cox | 33 | 31.0 | 0.8 | 8.5 | 0.7 | 1.0 | 12.3 |
| Tyson Dirks | 8 | 1.3 | 0.0 | 0.1 | 0.0 | 0.0 | 0.0 |
| Bill Eaddy | 14 | 2.8 | 0.1 | 0.6 | 0.1 | 0.1 | 1.6 |
| Adam Emmenecker | 33 | 33.1 | 1.6 | 4.6 | 6.5 | 0.1 | 8.6 |
| John Michael Hall | 33 | 9.9 | 0.5 | 1.1 | 0.6 | 0.0 | 3.5 |
| Brent Heemskerk | 33 | 18.1 | 0.8 | 3.3 | 0.6 | 0.8 | 4.7 |
| Leonard Houston | 33 | 31.6 | 1.4 | 4.5 | 1.8 | 0.2 | 14.1 |
| Klayton Korver | 33 | 27.0 | 0.7 | 3.9 | 1.2 | 0.1 | 10.4 |
| Josh Parker | 31 | 7.0 | 0.2 | 1.0 | 0.9 | 0.0 | 2.1 |
| Alex White | 10 | 9.8 | 0.7 | 2.9 | 0.3 | 0.3 | 3.7 |
| Josh Young | 30 | 31.9 | 1.4 | 2.5 | 1.8 | 0.1 | 15.9 |

== Schedule ==
| Date time, TV | Rank^{#} | Opponent^{#} | Result | Record | High points | High rebounds | High assists | Site (attendance) city, state |
Exhibition
| October 31, 2007*; 7:05 pm | | Central College | W 83–29 | 1–0 | 17 – Hall | 10 – White | 4 – Emmenecker | Knapp Center (3,859); Des Moines, IA |
| November 3, 2007*; 2:05 pm | | Southwest Minnesota State | W 69–51 | 2–0 | 19 – Korver | 6 – Young | 5 – Emmenecker | Knapp Center (3,669); Des Moines, IA |
Regular season
| November 9, 2007*; 3:30 pm | | vs. UC San Diego; Saint Mary's Tip-Off Classic First Round | W 81–63 | 1–0 | 21 – Houston | 10 – Cox | 4 – Emmenecker | McKeon Pavilion (257); Moraga, CA |
| November 10, 2007*; 9:35 pm | | at St. Mary's; Saint Mary's Tip-Off Classic Championship | L 66–72 | 1–1 | 18 – Cox | 9 – Cox | 4 – Emmenecker | McKeon Pavilion (1,836); Moraga, CA |
| November 14, 2007*; 7:05 pm | | Cornell | W 92–55 | 2–1 | 23 – Houston, Young | 9 – White | 6 – Emmenecker | Knapp Center (3,724); Des Moines, IA |
| November 24, 2007*; 7:05 pm | | at UW-Milwaukee | W 80–59 | 3–1 | 24 – Young | 10 – Cox | 6 – Emmenecker, Houston | U.S. Cellular Arena (3,550); Milwaukee, WI |
| November 30, 2007*; 7:30 pm, Mediacom | | North Carolina Central; Iowa Realty Invitational First Round | W 85–48 | 4–1 | 18 – Houston | 5 – Cox, Heemskerk, Houston, Korver, White | 7 – Emmenecker | Knapp Center (4,124); Des Moines, IA |
| December 1, 2007*; 7:30 pm, Mediacom | | Duquesne; Iowa Realty Invitational Championship | W 77–73 | 5–1 | 23 – Houston | 9 – Cox | 7 – Emmenecker | Knapp Center (3,793); Des Moines, IA |
| December 5, 2007*; 6:05 pm, KDSM, KFXA | | Iowa State | W 79–44 | 6–1 | 23 – Young | 7 – Cox | 4 – Emmenecker | Knapp Center (6,103); Des Moines, IA |
| December 7, 2007*; 7:37 pm, Mediacom | | Chicago State; Drake Regency Classic First Round | W 83–53 | 7–1 | 23 – Young | 10 – Cox | 3 – Emmenecker, Hall | Knapp Center (4,605); Des Moines, IA |
| December 8, 2007*; 7:30 pm, Mediacom | | Texas-Pan American; Drake Regency Classic Championship | W 83–55 | 8–1 | 18 – Heemskerk | 14 – Cox | 5 – Emmenecker | Knapp Center (4,274); Des Moines, IA |
| December 14, 2007*; 7:05 pm, Big Ten Network | | at Iowa | W 56–51 | 9–1 | 14 – Young | 10 – Cox | 3 – Emmenecker, Young | Carver-Hawkeye Arena (9,619); Iowa City, IA |
| December 29, 2007; 7:05 pm | | at Wichita State | W 62–54 | 10–1 (1–0) | 17 – Young | 8 – Cox, Emmenecker | 5 – Young | Charles Koch Arena (10,478); Wichita, KS |
| January 2, 2008; 7:05 pm, Mediacom | | Southern Illinois | W 61–51 | 11–1 (2–0) | 24 – Young | 7 – Houston | 3 – Emmenecker | Knapp Center (6,821); Des Moines, IA |
| January 6, 2008; 2:05 pm, FSN Midwest, Fox College Sports | | at Evansville | W 71–68 | 12–1 (3–0) | 19 – Cox | 6 – Cox | 10 – Emmenecker | Roberts Municipal Stadium (5,356); Evansville, IN |
| January 9, 2008; 7:05 pm, Mediacom | | Indiana State | W 75–50 | 13–1 (4–0) | 18 – Cox | 14 – Cox | 6 – Emmenecker | Knapp Center (7,168); Des Moines, IA |
| January 12, 2008; 7:05 pm, Mediacom | | Missouri State | W 65–54 | 14–1 (5–0) | 19 – Korver | 6 – Cox | 6 – Emmenecker | Knapp Center (7,047); Des Moines, IA |
| January 16, 2008; 7:05 pm | | at Bradley | W 69–68 | 15–1 (6–0) | 19 – Houston | 7 – Cox, Houston, Korver | 5 – Baryenbruch, Emmenecker, Houston | Carver Arena (9,029); Peoria, IL |
| January 19, 2008; 7:05 pm, Mediacom | | Illinois State | W 79–73 | 16–1 (7–0) | 19 – Emmenecker | 12 – Cox | 6 – Emmenecker | Knapp Center (7,152); Des Moines, IA |
| January 22, 2008; 7:05 pm | No. 23 | at Creighton | W 68–60 ^{OT} | 17–1 (8–0) | 14 – Korver | 6 – Cox, Emmenecker | 7 – Emmenecker | Qwest Center Omaha (17,053); Omaha, NE |
| January 26, 2008; 5:05 pm, KDSM, KFXA TV, ESPN Plus | No. 23 | Northern Iowa | W 68–64 | 18–1 (9–0) | 23 – Korver | 12 – Cox | 7 – Emmenecker | Knapp Center (7,152); Des Moines, IA |
| January 30, 2008; 7:05 pm, Mediacom | No. 17 | Creighton | W 75–65 | 19–1 (10–0) | 24 – Young | 10 – Cox | 9 – Emmenecker | Knapp Center (7,152); Des Moines, IA |
| February 2, 2008; 6:00 pm | No. 17 | at Indiana State | W 83–77 | 20–1 (11–0) | 20 – Emmenecker | 6 – Cox, Heemskerk, Houston | 8 – Emmenecker | Hulman Center (9,512); Terre Haute, IN |
| February 5, 2008; 7:05 pm | No. 15 | at Illinois State | W 73–70 | 21–1 (12–0) | 22 – Houston | 6 – Cox | 8 – Emmenecker | Redbird Arena (8,185); Normal, IL |
| February 9, 2008; 7:05 pm, Mediacom | No. 15 | Evansville | W 73–65 | 22–1 (13–0) | 21 – Cox | 7 – Houston | 9 – Emmenecker | Knapp Center (7,152); Des Moines, IA |
| February 13, 2008; 7:05 pm | No. 15 | at Southern Illinois | L 62–65 | 22–2 (13–1) | 17 – Young | 10 – Cox | 4 – Emmenecker | SIU Arena (5,712); Carbondale, IL |
| February 16, 2008; 1:05 pm, KDSM, KFXA | No. 15 | at Northern Iowa | W 65–55 | 23–2 (14–1) | 13 – Emmenecker | 7 – Cox, Emmenecker | 8 – Emmenecker | McLeod Center (7,293); Cedar Falls, IA |
| February 19, 2008; 7:35 pm, FSN Midwest, Fox College Sports | No. 18 | Bradley | L 71–72 | 23–3 (14–2) | 23 – Young | 7 – Houston | 7 – Emmenecker | Knapp Center (7,152); Des Moines, IA |
| February 23, 2008*; 4:00 pm, ESPN2 | No. 18 | at No. 8 Butler | W 71–64 | 24–3 | 25 – Young | 11 – Cox | 7 – Emmenecker | Hinkle Fieldhouse (10,000); Indianapolis, IN |
| February 26, 2008; 7:05 pm, Mediacom | No. 20 | at Missouri State | L 83–86 | 24–4 (14–3) | 18 – Young | 8 – Cox | 7 – Emmenecker | Hammons Student Center (7,507); Springfield, MO |
| March 1, 2008; 7:05 pm, ESPN2 | No. 20 | Wichita State | W 73–63 | 25–4 (15–3) | 19 – Korver | 7 – Cox | 8 – Emmenecker | Knapp Center (7,152); Des Moines, IA |
Missouri Valley Conference tournament
| March 7, 2008; 12:05 pm, Fox Sports | No. 21 | vs. Indiana State; Missouri Valley Conference tournament quarterfinals | W 68–46 | 26–4 | 16 – Houston | 10 – Emmenecker | 5 – Emmenecker | Scottrade Center (Unknown); St. Louis, MO |
| March 8, 2008; 1:35 pm, Fox Sports | No. 21 | vs. Creighton; Missouri Valley Conference tournament semifinals | W 75–67 | 27–4 | 20 – Emmenecker | 11 – Cox | 11 – Emmenecker | Scottrade Center (Unknown); St. Louis, MO |
| March 9, 2008; 1:05 pm, CBS | No. 21 | vs. Illinois State; Missouri Valley Conference tournament Championship | W 79–49 | 28–4 | 20 – Cox | 7 – Cox | 6 – Emmenecker | Scottrade Center (11,088); St. Louis, MO |
NCAA tournament
| March 21, 2008*; 11:30 am, CBS | No. 14 | vs. Western Kentucky; NCAA Tournament first round | L 99–101 ^{OT} | 28–5 | 29 – Cox | 16 – Cox | 14 – Emmenecker | St. Pete Times Forum (Unknown); Tampa, FL |
*Non-conference game. ^{#}Rankings from ESPN/USA Today Coaches Poll. (#) Tournament seedings in parentheses. All times are in Central Time..
