= Kevin Mouton =

American basketball coach

Kevin Mouton was hired as the head basketball coach at Second Baptist School in Houston, Texas in 2011. He has coached the team to three TAPPS 5A Final Fours, the 2018 state championship, and was named 2017-2018 Texas Association of Basketball Coaches coach of the Year.

He is a former college basketball assistant coach for Rice University in Houston, Texas. Mouton was formerly the interim head coach at Oregon State University. He became the head coach of the Beavers after the school fired Jay John on January 20, 2008. He was previously an assistant coach at the school.

Mouton is a graduate of the University of San Francisco. Prior to going to OSU, he coached at University of Nebraska–Lincoln, St. Mary's College, Eastern Illinois University, University of New Hampshire, Butler University, and Colorado School of Mines.
