= Tony Lee (basketball) =

American basketball player

Personal information
- Born: May 29, 1986 (age 40)
- Listed height: 6 ft 0 in (1.83 m)
- Listed weight: 205 lb (93 kg)

Career information
- High school: Charlestown (Boston, Massachusetts)
- College: Robert Morris (2004–2008)
- NBA draft: 2008: undrafted
- Playing career: 2008–2010
- Position: Point guard

Career history
- 2008–2009: Sportino Inowrocław
- 2010: Flyers Wels

Career highlights
- AP Honorable Mention All-American (2008); NEC Player of the Year (2008); First-team All-NEC (2008); Second-team All-NEC (2007); NEC All-Rookie Team (2005)

Tony Lee (born May 29, 1986) is an American former basketball player. He was a standout college player for the Robert Morris Colonials and played professionally in several countries.

Hailing from Boston, Lee played at Charlestown High School. He was lightly recruited due his size, but ultimately was signed by coach Mark Schmidt at Robert Morris over offers from Maryland Eastern Shore and Merrimack. He made his mark at the school, finishing his career in the school's top ten in points, rebounds and assists.

In the 2007–08 season, Lee led the Colonials to a Northeast Conference (NEC) regular season championship. He averaged 13.6 points, 6.6 rebounds and 6.4 assists per game and recorded triple-doubles in consecutive games. At the close of the season he was named the Northeast Conference Player of the Year and first-team all-NEC.

Following his college career, Lee played professionally in Poland and Austria. He was first tested in Slovenia and then played the 2008–09 season in Poland with Sportino Inowrocław. For the 2009–10 season, he joined BK Ventspils in Latvia but left the team before making his debut. For the 2010–11 season, he joined Flyers Wels in Austria but left after playing 11 games. His final game came on November 27, 2010.
