= 2007–08 Wichita State Shockers men's basketball team =

American college basketball season

2007–08 Wichita State Shockers men's basketball
- Conference: Missouri Valley Conference
- Record: 11–20 (4–14 MVC)
- Head coach: Gregg Marshall (1st season)
- Assistant coaches: Earl Grant; Marty Gross; Chris Jans
- Home arena: Charles Koch Arena (Capacity: 10,502)

2007–08 Missouri Valley Conference men's basketball standings
	Conf.				Overall
Team	W		L	PCT	W		L	PCT
No. 14 Drake †	15	–	3	.833	28	–	5	.848
Illinois State	13	–	5	.722	25	–	10	.714
Southern Illinois	11	–	7	.611	18	–	15	.545
Creighton	10	–	8	.556	22	–	11	.667
Bradley	9	–	9	.500	21	–	17	.553
Northern Iowa	9	–	9	.500	18	–	14	.563
Missouri State	8	–	10	.444	17	–	16	.515
Indiana State	8	–	10	.444	15	–	16	.484
Wichita State	4	–	14	.222	11	–	20	.355
Evansville	3	–	15	.167	9	–	21	.300
† 2008 MVC tournament winner Rankings from AP Poll

The 2007–08 Wichita State Shockers men's basketball team represented Wichita State University in the 2007–08 NCAA Division I men's basketball season. The team, which played in the Missouri Valley Conference (MVC), was led by first-year head coach Gregg Marshall.

== Missouri Valley Conference standings ==
#	Team	Conference	Pct.	Overall	Pct.
1	Drake	15–3	.833	28–5	.848
2	Illinois State	13–5	.722	25–10	.714
3	Southern Illinois	11–7	.611	18–15	.545
4	Creighton	10–8	.556	23–11	.676
5	Bradley	9–9	.500	20–17	.541
6	Northern Iowa	9–9	.500	18–14	.563
7	Missouri State	8–10	.444	17–16	.515
8	Indiana State	8–10	.444	15–16	.484
9	Wichita State	4–14	.222	11–20	.355
10	Evansville	3–15	.167	9–21	.300
