= Rob Flaska =

American basketball coach (born 1960)

Biographical details
- Born: March 23, 1960 (age 66); Normal, Michigan, U.S.

Playing career
- 1978–1982: Michigan Tech

Coaching career (HC unless noted)
- 1982–1984: Indiana State (assistant)
- 1984–1986: Detroit (assistant)
- 1986–1991: Mott CC
- 1991–1992: Texas–Pan American (assistant)
- 1992–1995: Trinity Valley CC (assistant)
- 1995–1998: FCCJ
- 1998–2002: TCU (assistant)
- 2002–2005: Arkansas (assistant)
- 2005–2008: Centenary
- 2008–2016: Texas State (assistant)

Head coaching record
- Overall: 24–65 (college)

Rob Flaska (born March 23, 1960) is an American former basketball coach. He served as the head men's basketball coach at Centenary College of Louisiana from 2005 to 2008. His contract was not renewed following his third season with the Gentlemen.

Prior to arriving at Centenary, Flaska served as an assistant coach at the University of Arkansas and Texas Christian University (TCU), playing integral parts in recruiting at both schools. Flaska was also a head coach at the junior college level, spending five years as the head man at Mott Community College in Flint, Michigan, and another three years as head coach at Florida Community College at Jacksonville.

Flaska played college basketball at Michigan Technological University, where he set career records in steals and assists.

== Head coaching record ==
=== College ===
Record table
Season	Team	Overall	Conference	Standing	Postseason
Centenary Gentlemen (Summit League) (2005–2008)
2005–06	Centenary	4–23	2–14	9th	
2006–07	Centenary	10–21	3–11	T–7th	
2007–08	Centenary	10–21	4–14	9th	
Centenary:		24–65	9–39		
Total:		24–65			
