= 2007–08 Illinois State Redbirds men's basketball team =

American college basketball season

2007–08 Illinois State Redbirds men's basketball

NIT, Second Round
- Conference: Missouri Valley Conference
- Record: 25–10 (13–5 MVC)
- Head coach: Tim Jankovich (1st season)
- Assistant coaches: Rob Judson; Anthony Beane; Paris Parham
- Home arena: Doug Collins Court at Redbird Arena

2007–08 Missouri Valley Conference men's basketball standings
	Conf.				Overall
Team	W		L	PCT	W		L	PCT
No. 14 Drake †	15	–	3	.833	28	–	5	.848
Illinois State	13	–	5	.722	25	–	10	.714
Southern Illinois	11	–	7	.611	18	–	15	.545
Creighton	10	–	8	.556	22	–	11	.667
Bradley	9	–	9	.500	21	–	17	.553
Northern Iowa	9	–	9	.500	18	–	14	.563
Missouri State	8	–	10	.444	17	–	16	.515
Indiana State	8	–	10	.444	15	–	16	.484
Wichita State	4	–	14	.222	11	–	20	.355
Evansville	3	–	15	.167	9	–	21	.300
† 2008 MVC tournament winner Rankings from AP Poll

The 2007–08 Illinois State Redbirds men's basketball team represented Illinois State University during the 2007–08 NCAA Division I men's basketball season. The Redbirds, led by first year head coach Tim Jankovich, played their home games at Doug Collins Court at Redbird Arena and were a member of the Missouri Valley Conference.

The Redbirds finished the season 25–10, 13–5 in conference play to finish in second place. They were the number two seed for the Missouri Valley Conference tournament. They won their quarterfinal game versus Missouri State University and semifinal game versus the University of Northern Iowa but lost their final game versus Drake University.

The Redbirds received an at-large bid to the 2008 National Invitation Tournament and were assigned the number two seed in the Ohio State University regional. They were victorious over Utah State University in the first round and were defeated by Dayton University in the second round.

== Roster ==
2007–08 Illinois State Redbirds men's basketball team
Players
Coaches

Pos.	#	Name	Height	Weight	Year	Hometown
C	32	Levi Dyer	6 ft 11 in (2.11 m)	220 lb (100 kg)	Sr	Eaton, CO
G	10	Dom Johnson	6 ft 0 in (1.83 m)	185 lb (84 kg)	Sr	Bell City, MO
G	22	Julius Moor	6 ft 3 in (1.91 m)	185 lb (84 kg)	Sr	Kieler, WI
G	5	Keith Richardson	5 ft 8 in (1.73 m)	160 lb (73 kg)	Sr	Kansas City, KS
F	4	Anthony Slack	6 ft 7 in (2.01 m)	210 lb (95 kg)	Sr	New Orleans, LA
G	1	Emmanuel Holloway	6 ft 2 in (1.88 m)	190 lb (86 kg)	Jr	Cartersville, GA
G	45	Brandon Holtz	6 ft 4 in (1.93 m)	185 lb (84 kg)	Jr	Bloomington, IL
G	25	Sead Odzic	6 ft 3 in (1.91 m)	192 lb (87 kg)	Jr	Skokie, IL
C	41	Brandon Sampay	6 ft 8 in (2.03 m)	255 lb (116 kg)	Jr	Inglewood, CA
F	31	Mike Vandello	6 ft 7 in (2.01 m)	220 lb (100 kg)	Jr	Bettendorf, IA
F	42	Dinma Odiakosa	6 ft 8 in (2.03 m)	240 lb (109 kg)	RS So	Akwukwu, Nigeria
G	0	Osiris Eldridge	6 ft 3 in (1.91 m)	190 lb (86 kg)	So	Chicago, IL
G	3	Alex Rubin	6 ft 1 in (1.85 m)	185 lb (84 kg)	Fr	Plymouth, MN

Head coach

- Tim Jankovich (Kansas State)

Assistant coach(es)

- Rob Judson (Illinois)
- Anthony Beane (Kansas State)
- Paris Parham (Minnesota State)

Legend

- (C) Team captain
- (S) Suspended
- (I) Ineligible
- (W) Walk-on
- Injured
- Current redshirt

== Schedule ==
Date time, TV	Rank^{#}	Opponent^{#}	Result	Record	High points	High rebounds	High assists	Site (attendance) city, state
Exhibition Season
November 7, 2007; 7:05 pm		Quincy	W 81–61		19 – Dyer	10 – Eldridge	6 – Eldridge	Doug Collins Court at Redbird Arena; Normal, IL
Regular Season
November 11, 2007*; 1:05 pm		Missouri–St. Louis	W 70–37	1–0	12 – Slack	7 – Slack	3 – Dyer, Johnson, Richardson	Doug Collins Court at Redbird Arena (4,185); Normal, IL
November 14, 2007*; 7:05 pm		Southeast Missouri State; Chicago Invitational Challenge [Campus Site]	W 90–71	2–0	27 – Eldridge	13 – Slack	6 – Richardson	Doug Collins Court at Redbird Arena (4,522); Normal, IL
November 18, 2007*; 2:05 pm		North Carolina–Wilmington; Chicago Invitational Challenge [Campus Site]	W 89–73	3–0	30 – Eldridge	7 – Eldridge	6 – Johnson	Doug Collins Court at Redbird Arena (4,433); Normal, IL
November 23, 2007*; 7:30 pm, BTN		vs. No. 8 Indiana; Chicago Invitational Challenge [Semifinal]	L 57–70	3–1	18 – Dyer	8 – Odiakosa	5 – Eldridge	Sears Centre (4,500); Hoffman Estates, IL
November 24, 2007*; 5:00 pm		vs. Kent State; Chicago Invitational Challenge [Third Place]	L 59–65	3–2	11 – Eldridge	9 – Slack	3 – Johnson, Richardson, Holtz	Sears Centre (4,000); Hoffman Estates, IL
November 27, 2007*; 7:05 pm		Chicago State	W 81–49	4–2	16 – Dyer	10 – Dyer	7 – Richardson	Doug Collins Court at Redbird Arena (4,818); Normal, IL
December 1, 2007*; 7:05 pm		Illinois–Chicago	W 73–47	5–2	25 – Dyer	8 – Slack	8 – Richardson	Doug Collins Court at Redbird Arena (4,749); Normal, IL
December 4, 2007*; 6:00 pm		at Eastern M⁬ichigan	L 63–72	5–3	18 – Eldridge	13 – Eldridge	5 – Richardson	Convocation Center (385); Ypsilanti, MI
December 8, 2007*; 7:05 pm		Cincinnati	W 62–52	6–3	20 – Eldridge	9 – Eldridge	4 – Johnson	Doug Collins Court at Redbird Arena (6,529); Normal, IL
December 16, 2007*; 1:00 pm		at Bowling Green State	W 69–58	7–3	16 – Johnson	11 – Eldridge	4 – Richardson, Holloway	Anderson Arena (659); Bowling Green, OH
December 22, 2007*; 1:00 pm		at Ball State	W 65–49	8–3	16 – Richardson	12 – Odiakosa	6 – Richardson	John E. Worthen Arena (2,636); Muncie, IN
December 29, 2007; 7:05 pm, CSN/FSN		at Creighton	W 80–67	9–3 (1–0)	20 – Dyer	11 – Slack	5 – Johnson, Richardson, Slack	Qwest Center Omaha (16,808); Omaha, NE
January 1, 2008; 7:05 pm		at Wichita State	W 49–46	10–3 (2–0)	11 – Eldridge	8 – Eldridge	4 – Richardson	Charles Koch Arena (10,478); Wichita, KS
January 5, 2008; 7:05 pm		Southern Illinois	W 56–47	11–3 (3–0)	14 – Dyer	6 – Slack	4 – Johnson, Richardson	Doug Collins Court at Redbird Arena (9,437); Normal, IL
January 8, 2008; 7:05 pm		Northern Iowa	W 51–46	12–3 (4–0)	13 – Eldridge	9 – Eldridge	3 – Eldridge	Doug Collins Court at Redbird Arena (5,082); Normal, IL
January 12, 2008; 7:05 pm, CSN/FSN		Evansville	W 74–66	13–3 (5–0)	17 – Eldridge	8 – Sampay	4 – Sampay	Doug Collins Court at Redbird Arena (7,117); Normal, IL
January 16, 2008; 7:05 pm		Wichita State	W 72–51	14–3 (6–0)	21 – Eldridge	4 – Dyer, Slack	5 – Dyer	Doug Collins Court at Redbird Arena (6,723); Normal, IL
January 19, 2008; 7:05 pm		at Drake	L 73–79	14–4 (6–1)	21 – Slack, Eldridge	9 – Eldridge	4 – Johnson	The Knapp Center (7,152); Des Moines, IA
January 23, 2008; 7:05 pm, CSN		at Bradley	L 75–76	14–5 (6–2)	17 – Richardson	7 – Sampay, Eldridge	4 – Richardson	Carver Arena (11,421); Peoria, IL
January 27, 2008; 2:05 pm		Indiana State	W 65–62	15–5 (7–2)	15 – Eldridge, Odiakosa	9 – Sampay	5 – Richardson, Eldridge	Doug Collins Court at Redbird Arena (8,016); Normal, IL
January 30, 2008; 7:05 pm		at Northern Iowa	L 61–69	15–6 (7–3)	17 – Johnson	7 – Sampay	2 – Vandello	McLeod Center (4,454); Cedar Falls, IA
February 2, 2008; 7:05 pm		at Missouri State	W 64–63	16–6 (8–3)	23 – Johnson	8 – Slack	6 – Richardson	John Q. Hammons Student Center (7,003); Springfield, MO
February 5, 2008; 7:05 pm		No. 15 Drake	L 70–73	16–7 (8–4)	17 – Johnson	10 – Slack	8 – Johnson	Doug Collins Court at Redbird Arena (8,185); Normal, IL
February 9, 2008; 7:05 pm		Bradley	W 72–68	17–7 (9–4)	24 – Eldridge	9 – Odiakosa	8 – Johnson	Doug Collins Court at Redbird Arena (10,200); Normal, IL
February 13, 2008; 7:05 pm		Missouri State	W 69–57	18–7 (10–4)	24 – Eldridge	10 – Slack	5 – Johnson	Doug Collins Court at Redbird Arena (5,446); Normal, IL
February 16, 2008; 1:00 pm		at Indiana State	L 72-76	18–8 (10–5)	34 – Eldridge	8 – Odiakosa	3 – Richardson, Odzic	Hulman Center (4,570); Terre Haute, IN
February 20, 2008; 7:05 pm		at Evansville	W 49–47	19–8 (11–5)	10 – Richardson, Holloway	12 – Slack	3 – Richardson	Roberts Municipal Stadium (4,907); Evansville, IN
February 24, 2008*; 5:30 pm, ESPNU		Wright State; O’Reilly ESPNU BracketBusters	W 54–46	20–8	16 – Holloway	8 – Slack	4 – Holloway	Doug Collins Court at Redbird Arena (6,089); Normal, IL
February 27, 2008; 7:05 pm		Creighton	W 68–54	21–8 (12–5)	15 – Slack, Eldridge	20 – Slack	7 – Richardson	Doug Collins Court at Redbird Arena (6,563); Normal, IL
March 1, 2008; 7:30 pm		at Southern Illinois	W 57–49	22–8 (13–5)	27 – Eldridge	9 – Odiakosa	2 – Richardson	SIU Arena (9,345); Carbondale, IL
State Farm Missouri Valley Conference {MVC} tournament
March 7, 2008; 6:05 pm, CSN/FSN	(2)	vs. (7) Missouri State; Quarterfinal	W 63–58	23–8	14 – Richardson	7 – Sampay	3 – Holloway	Scottrade Center (15,204); St. Louis, MO
March 8, 2008; 4:05 pm, CSN/FSN	(2)	vs. (6) Northern Iowa; Semifinal	W 56–42	24–8	13 – Eldridge	8 – Eldridge	5 – Richardson	Scottrade Center (16,829); St. Louis, MO
March 9, 2008; 1:05 pm, CBS	(2)	vs. (1) No. 20 Drake; Final	L 49–79	24–9	14 – Eldridge	5 – Slack, Odiakosa	4 – Holloway	Scottrade Center (11,088); St. Louis, MO
MasterCard National Invitation {NIT} tournament
March 19, 2008; 9:00 pm, ESPNU	(2)	(7) Utah State; Ohio State Regional [First Round]	W 61–57	25–9	14 – Eldridge	7 – Slack	6 – Eldridge	Doug Collins Court at Redbird Arena (6,397); Normal, IL
March 24, 2008; 6:00 pm, ESPNU	(2)	(3) Dayton; Ohio State Regional [Second Round]	L 48–55	25–10	14 – Odiakosa	14 – Slack	6 – Johnson	Doug Collins Court at Redbird Arena (8,802); Normal, IL
*Non-conference game. ^{#}Rankings from AP Poll. (#) Tournament seedings in parentheses. All times are in Central Standard Time.
