= Adam Emmenecker =

American basketball player (born 1985)

Personal information
- Born: December 3, 1985 (age 40) Saginaw, Michigan, U.S.
- Listed height: 6 ft 1 in (1.85 m)
- Listed weight: 189 lb (86 kg)

Career information
- High school: Arthur Hill (Saginaw, Michigan)
- College: Drake (2004–2008)
- NBA draft: 2008: undrafted
- Playing career: 2008–2009
- Position: Point guard
- Number: 15

Career history
- 2008–2009: Skyliners Frankfurt

Career highlights
- MVC Player of the Year (2008); First-team All-MVC (2008); MVC tournament MVP (2008); Academic All-American of the Year (2008)

Adam Cannata Emmenecker (born December 3, 1985) is an American basketball player who completed his college career as a point guard at Drake University in Des Moines, Iowa in 2008.

During the 2007–08 basketball season, Emmenecker, who had been a walk-on (non-scholarship player) for his first three years at Drake, emerged from obscurity to lead the Bulldogs to a sweep of the regular-season and tournament titles in the Missouri Valley Conference, and received numerous honors for his performance as both a player and a student.

== Early life ==
Emmenecker was born in Saginaw, Michigan.

While at Arthur Hill High School in Saginaw, Emmenecker was a two-sport star, starting for and captaining the basketball team for three years and earning all-league honors twice in baseball. His high school basketball statistics were those of a pass-first point guard—8.4 assists per game as opposed to only 4.7 points per game. He also averaged 5.9 rebounds and 3.2 steals per game. In his senior season of 2003–04, he led his team to a 22–2 record and a ranking of #25 in that year's final USA Today national high school basketball poll. Emmenecker was an honorable mention all-state player in Michigan's Class A, and was also named Arthur Hill's outstanding graduate of 2004.

== Drake ==
=== Walk-on obscurity ===
Emmenecker received no NCAA Division I scholarship offers in basketball, and nearly decided to play baseball at Boston College before opting to attend Drake. He received a Presidential Scholarship, a partial tuition scholarship "for academic achievement," and also walked on to the basketball team. In his first season (2004–05), he played in 12 games, with his most extensive game action being six minutes against Western Illinois. As a sophomore in 2005–06, he played in 29 games, starting two, and averaged seven minutes. The following year, he became the Bulldogs' top reserve guard, averaging 11 minutes per game in 23 games before his season ended with a shoulder injury against Missouri State.

=== Statistics ===
==== Averages ====
Season	Age	Team	GP	GS	MPG	FG%	3P%	FT%	OFF	DEF	RPG	APG	SPG	BPG	TO	PF	PPG
2004–05	18	Drake	12	0	2.0	.000	.000	1.000	0.00	0.08	0.1	0.4	0.0	0.0	0.4	0.3	0.3
2005–06	19	Drake	29	2	7.3	.353	.000	.625	0.20	0.65	0.9	0.9	0.3	0.0	0.8	0.7	0.8
2006–07	20	Drake	23	0	11.3	.278	.000	.704	0.65	0.78	1.4	1.6	.8	0.0	1.1	0.9	1.3
2007–08	21	Drake	33	33	33.1	.459	.000	.833	2.15	2.48	4.6	6.5	1.6	0.1	3.1	2.1	8.6
Career			97	35	16.4	.432	.000	.802	0.95	1.24	2.2	2.9	0.8	0.06	1.6	1.2	3.5

==== Totals ====
Year	Age	Team	G	GS	MIN	FGM	FGA	3PM	3PA	FTM	FTA	OFF	DEF	REB	AST	STL	BLK	TO	PF	PTS
2004–05	18	Drake	12	0	24	0	1	0	0	4	4	0	1	1	5	0	0	5	4	4
2005–06	19	Drake	29	2	213	6	17	0	1	10	16	6	19	25	27	9	1	23	19	22
2006–07	20	Drake	23	0	259	5	18	0	1	19	27	15	18	33	37	18	1	25	20	29
2007–08	21	Drake	33	33	1093	79	172	0	2	125	150	71	82	153	213	53	4	103	69	283
4 Season Totals			97	35	1589	90	208	0	4	158	197	92	120	212	282	80	6	156	112	338

Source: "DrakeBulldogs.org". Archived from the original on May 5, 2006. and espn.com

== Campus life ==
=== 2007–08: The Cinderella season ===
Going into the 2007–08 season, Drake was lightly regarded, returning only one starter, forward Klayton Korver, from a 2006–07 team that had won 17 games. In the MVC's preseason poll of media members, league coaches, and league sports information directors, the Bulldogs were picked to finish ninth out of 10 teams, and no Drake player was selected even as an honorable mention on the league's preseason all-conference team. Emmenecker did achieve a personal milestone two days before the Bulldogs started their season. After three years as a walk-on, he was given a full athletic scholarship for his final season.

After splitting two games in California to open the season, Drake emerged as one of the surprises of the 2007–08 basketball season, embarking on a winning streak that would reach 21 games before ending on February 13, 2008, against Southern Illinois. The Bulldogs went on to finish 15–3 in conference play, winning their first MVC regular-season title since 1971 by two games. They added the MVC tournament to their regular-season crown, securing their first NCAA tournament bid since 1971 and their first postseason berth of any kind since the 1986 NIT. The Bulldogs went on to lose an overtime heartbreaker in the first round of the NCAA tournament to Western Kentucky on a long three-pointer at the buzzer by Western's Ty Rogers. In his final competitive game, Emmenecker struggled with his shooting from the field, going 0-for-10, but still got a double-double with 11 points and 14 assists.

The former walk-on emerged as a major star in Drake's Cinderella season. Although he averaged only 8.5 points per game for the season, his average in MVC regular-season play was 10.3. Emmenecker's contributions in other facets of the game proved much more important than his scoring. His 6.45 assists per game led the MVC by more than one per game, and he set a single-season school record for assists. He was also among the league's top five in steals and assist-to-turnover ratio, and in the league's top 10 in minutes played, free throw percentage, and—somewhat surprisingly for a 6-foot-1-inch (1.85 m) point guard—offensive rebounds.

Emmenecker became the MVC's most-decorated player of the 2007–08 season:

- He was named as the captain of the MVC's All-Improved Team, joining Drake teammates Jonathan Cox and Leonard Houston on that team.
- He also made the All-MVC first team alongside Josh Young.
- In addition, he was named the Larry Bird MVC Player of the Year.
- Finally, he was named MVP of the 2008 MVC Tournament.

When the MVC announced him as season MVP, it called him "perhaps the most improbable MVC Player of the Year (based on pre-season expectations) in league history." Entering the 2007–08 season, he had played 58 games in three seasons, but had only started two, and had career totals of 57 points and 64 assists. His 2007–08 season totals in points, assists, and rebounds all were at least double his previous career statistics in each category.

Emmenecker's 2007–08 season, and indeed his Drake career, may best be summed up by Keno Davis, who was a Drake assistant under his father, Dr. Tom Davis, when Emmenecker arrived as a walk-on, succeeded his father as head coach for the 2007–08 season, was named 2008 MVC Coach of the Year, and won multiple national Coach of the Year awards:

We thought that maybe by his senior year he could start for us. But I never had any idea he could do this. He's exceeded all of our expectations, kind of like our team has.

Emmenecker was recognized as Honorable Mention on the AP All-American Team.

=== Jethro’s Challenge ===
Jethro's BBQ, a local eatery chain in Des Moines, named a food challenge after Emmenecker. It consists of a cheeseburger topped with bacon, Texas beef brisket, fried cheese cubes, white cheddar sauce, buffalo chicken strips, a pork tenderloin, all on a bun topped with a spicy pickle. It is accompanied by one pound of waffle fries. This entire meal must be consumed in 15 minutes to win. This challenge was featured on the Travel Channel show Man v. Food and the Flemish tourist show Reizen Waes.

=== Academic accolades ===
Emmenecker's accomplishments on the court in 2007–08 were arguably eclipsed by his academic record. As of February 2008, he carried a 3.97 grade point average in three majors—management, finance, and entrepreneurial management. He was chosen as the 2008 Academic All-American of the Year in men's Division I basketball by the College Sports Information Directors of America, and was also named the MVC Scholar-Athlete of the Year in men's basketball.

== Pro career ==
=== Basketball Bundesliga ===
Emmenecker played for the Deutsche Bank Skyliners in Frankfurt, Germany in 2008–2009.
