= 2008 Missouri Valley Conference men's basketball tournament =

- Classification: Division I
- Season: 2007–08
- Teams: 10
- Site: Scottrade Center; St. Louis, Missouri
- Champions: Drake (1st title)
- Winning coach: Keno Davis (1st title)
- MVP: Adam Emmenecker (Drake)

2007–08 Missouri Valley Conference men's basketball standings
| | Conf. | | | | Overall |
| Team | W | | L | PCT | W | | L | PCT |
|---|---|---|---|---|---|---|---|---|
| No. 14 Drake † | 15 | – | 3 | .833 | 28 | – | 5 | .848 |
| Illinois State | 13 | – | 5 | .722 | 25 | – | 10 | .714 |
| Southern Illinois | 11 | – | 7 | .611 | 18 | – | 15 | .545 |
| Creighton | 10 | – | 8 | .556 | 22 | – | 11 | .667 |
| Bradley | 9 | – | 9 | .500 | 21 | – | 17 | .553 |
| Northern Iowa | 9 | – | 9 | .500 | 18 | – | 14 | .563 |
| Missouri State | 8 | – | 10 | .444 | 17 | – | 16 | .515 |
| Indiana State | 8 | – | 10 | .444 | 15 | – | 16 | .484 |
| Wichita State | 4 | – | 14 | .222 | 11 | – | 20 | .355 |
| Evansville | 3 | – | 15 | .167 | 9 | – | 21 | .300 |
† 2008 MVC tournament winner Rankings from AP Poll

The 2008 Missouri Valley Conference men's basketball tournament was played in St. Louis, Missouri at the conclusion of the 2007–2008 regular season.

== Tournament Bracket ==
Opening Round; Thursday, March 6
8 | Indiana State | 71
9 | Wichita State | 67
7 | Missouri State | 69
10 | Evansville | 46

Quarterfinals; Friday, March 7
1 | No. 20 Drake | 68
8 | Indiana State | 46
4 | Creighton | 74
5 | Bradley | 70
2 | Illinois State | 63
7 | Missouri State | 58
3 | Southern Illinois | 49
6 | Northern Iowa | 54

Semifinals; Saturday, March 8
1 | No. 20 Drake | 75
4 | Creighton | 67
2 | Illinois State | 56
6 | Northern Iowa | 42

Final; Sunday, March 9
1 | No. 20 Drake | 79
2 | Illinois State | 49

== See also ==
- Missouri Valley Conference
