= Keno Davis =

American basketball coach (born 1972)

Indiana Pacers
- Position: College coaching consultant

Personal information
- Born: March 10, 1972 (age 54) Easton, Pennsylvania, U.S.

Career information
- College: Iowa
- Coaching career: 1991–present

Career history

Coaching
- 1991–1995: Iowa (assistant)
- 1995–1997: Southern Indiana (assistant)
- 1997–2003: Southeast Missouri State (assistant)
- 2003–2007: Drake (assistant)
- 2007–2008: Drake
- 2008–2011: Providence
- 2012–2021: Central Michigan
- 2022–2023: Flint United
- 2023–2024: Indiana Pacers (college scouting consultant)

Career highlights
- MVC regular season (2008); MVC tournament (2008); MAC regular season (2015); 2 MAC West Division regular season (2015, 2016); AP National Coach of the Year (2008); Sporting News Coach of the Year (2008); Henry Iba Award (2008); Hugh Durham Award (2008); MVC Coach of the Year (2008); MAC Coach of the Year (2015); Skip Prosser Man of the Year (2015)

Keno Emlen Davis (born March 10, 1972) an American basketball coach who worked last season as a college basketball color analyst, and as a college scouting consultant for the Indiana Pacers of the NBA. He was most recently the men's basketball head coach at Central Michigan University. Davis was previously head coach at Drake University for one season (2007–08), where he was named the 2008 Associated Press College Basketball Coach of the Year, and at Providence College for three seasons (2008–2011). Davis also served as an assistant coach at Drake from 2003–2007 under his father Tom Davis prior to starting his coaching career.

== Coaching career ==
Davis served as an undergraduate assistant coach at the University of Iowa under his father from 1991–1995. After graduating, he served as an assistant coach at the University of Southern Indiana from 1995–1997 and at Southeast Missouri State University from 1997–2003. He rejoined his father as an assistant coach after the elder Davis was named head coach at Drake University in April 2003. When his father retired in 2007, Keno Davis became the team's head coach, and led the Bulldogs to a 28–5 record and a berth in the 2008 NCAA Division I men's basketball tournament. Following the season, Davis was named the College Basketball Coach of the Year by 6 organizations including the Associated Press and U.S. Basketball Writers Association. Davis left Drake University to join the Big East Conference as the head coach of Providence College in April 2008. After the 2010–11 season, Davis joined the Big Ten Network as an analyst for the 2011–12 college basketball season.

Davis was introduced by Central Michigan University as the Chippewas' 20th head men's basketball coach on April 3, 2012. Just four players would be on CMU's roster from the previous season (all of which would be reserves for Davis). One of the youngest teams in the country, the Chippewas found a way to win in double figures each season though only acquiring a 21–41 overall record.

Central Michigan finished the 2014–15 regular season 22–7 (12–6) and earned the top seed in the MAC conference tournament.

== Head coaching record ==
Record table
Season	Team	Overall	Conference	Standing	Postseason
Drake Bulldogs (Missouri Valley Conference) (2007–2008)
2007–08	Drake	28–5	15–3	1st	NCAA Division I Round of 64
Drake:		28–5 (.848)	15–3 (.833)		
Providence Friars (Big East Conference) (2008–2011)
2008–09	Providence	19–14	10–8	T–6th	NIT First Round
2009–10	Providence	12–19	4–14	15th	
2010–11	Providence	15–17	4–14	14th	
Providence:		46–50 (.479)	18–36 (.333)		
Central Michigan Chippewas (Mid-American Conference) (2012–2021)
2012–13	Central Michigan	11–20	4–12	5th (West)	
2013–14	Central Michigan	10–21	3–15	5th (West)	
2014–15	Central Michigan	23–9	12–6	1st (West)	NIT First Round
2015–16	Central Michigan	17–16	10–8	T–1st (West)	CIT First Round
2016–17	Central Michigan	16–16	6–12	6th (West)	
2017–18	Central Michigan	21–15	7–11	5th (West)	CIT Quarterfinal
2018–19	Central Michigan	23–12	10–8	2nd (West)	CBI First Round
2019–20	Central Michigan	14–18	7–11	4th (West)	
2020–21	Central Michigan	7–16	3–13	11th	
Central Michigan:		142–143 (.498)	62–96 (.392)		
Total:		216–198 (.522)			
National champion Postseason invitational champion Conference regular season champion Conference regular season and conference tournament champion Division regular season champion Division regular season and conference tournament champion Conference tournament champion
