= Adam Rittenberg =

American journalist (born 1981)

- Born: August 15, 1981 (age 45); Berkeley, California, U.S.
- Occupation: Journalist
- Website: www.espn.com/college-football/

Adam Rittenberg (born August 15, 1981) is a sports journalist and senior writer for ESPN's college football section. Before 2008 when he joined ESPN, he was a sports writer at Daily Herald (Arlington Heights) in Illinois. Rittenberg is a graduate of Northwestern University and resides near Chicago, Illinois.

== See also ==
- ESPN
- ESPN College Football
- Big Ten Conference
