= Eric Bridgeland =

American basketball coach

Eric Bridgeland is a college basketball coach and the former head coach of the Whitman College Blues. Prior to that he was the interim head coach at Pepperdine University. He became the head coach of the Waves after Vance Walberg resigned for personal reasons on January 17, 2008. He was previously an assistant coach at the school.

In April 2020 he was named the head coach of the University of Redlands Bulldogs.

Bridgeland is a graduate of the University of Manitoba. Prior to going to Pepperdine, he coached at University of Puget Sound, University of California, Santa Cruz, Stephen F. Austin University, and the Colorado School of Mines.
