= Jay John =

American basketball coach

Biographical details
- Born: May 29, 1958 (age 68); Tucson, Arizona, U.S.

Coaching career (HC unless noted)
- 1980–1983: Salpointe Catholic HS (asst.)
- 1983–1985: Jamestown CC (asst.)
- 1985–1986: Oregon (asst.)
- 1986–1988: Jamestown CC
- 1988–1989: San Francisco (asst.)
- 1989–1997: Butler (asst.)
- 1997–1998: Oregon (asst.)
- 1998–2002: Arizona (asst.)
- 2002–2008: Oregon State
- 2008–2012: California (asst.)

Jay John (born May 29, 1958) is a college basketball coach, most recently an assistant men's basketball coach for the California Golden Bears at the University of California, Berkeley. He was the former men's basketball head coach of the Oregon State Beavers at Oregon State University.

== Early life ==
Born in Tucson, Arizona, John's college basketball playing career was as a walk-on player at Northern Arizona University. He also was a walk-on football player at NAU as well. He later transferred and is a 1981 graduate of the University of Arizona with a degree in biology. He continued his education at Butler, where he earned a Master of Science degree in 1994.

== Coaching career ==
John's first coaching position was as a basketball coach at his alma mater, Salpointe Catholic High School in Tucson, Arizona. At Salpointe, John served as the freshman head coach and a varsity assistant for three seasons from 1980 to 1983. He also taught physical science and biology there.

John's next job was at Jamestown Community College in New York, as an assistant from 1983 to 1985. He left Jamestown in 1985 to become an assistant coach with the University of Oregon, serving under head coach Don Monson. After one season with the Ducks, John returned to Jamestown to become the head coach for the 1986–87 and 1987–88 seasons. He led JCC to a two-year mark of 41–19 and to the Region 3 West Zone title game his first year. John was named the conference's Coach of the Year.

After two seasons as the head coach at Jamestown, John left to become an assistant coach at the University of San Francisco. He remained in San Francisco for one season.

John moved on again to become an assistant to Barry Collier at Butler University. He was a member of the Bulldogs' staff from 1989 to 1997, and helped the team to a then-school record 23 wins his final year. The 1997 team advanced to the NCAA Tournament for the first time in 35 years.

In 1997, John again became an assistant coach at the University of Oregon. He remained with the Ducks for one season.

The following season, John was hired as an assistant at the University of Arizona, under legendary coach Lute Olson (a 2002 Naismith Hall of Fame inductee). In four seasons at Arizona, John helped the Wildcats to four NCAA Tournament appearances, including the national championship game in 2001. While in Tucson, Arizona finished in the top 12 in the national rankings every season, six student-athletes were selected in the NBA Draft, and on nine occasions individuals were selected to the All-Pac-10 team. John has been credited with the development of the Wildcats’ power forwards and centers during his tenure. Lindy's College Basketball Yearbook named him one of five assistant coaches to watch, and Hoop Scoop ranked him number one in its top 25 assistant coaches poll.

In April 2002, John was introduced as the 19th head basketball coach in Oregon State's storied history.

In his first season at Oregon State, John's team earned its most conference victories in eight seasons, going 6–12 in the Pac-10 (6th-T), Oregon State's highest conference standing in 10 years. His team won at USC and UCLA in the same season for the first time in 15 years and captured the most road victories in one season in a decade.

The 2004–05 season, year 3 for John, was the season that things really got turned around. The team posted their first winning record in 15 seasons, going 8–10 in the Pac-10 and 17–15 overall. This was Oregon State's most conference wins and highest place in the conference(5th) since the 1992–93 season. John's squad won a Pac-10 Tournament game for the first time since 1989, beating UCLA in the first round. The Beavers earned a post-season berth for the first time since 1990, receiving a bid to the National Invitation Tournament.

However, the Beavers regressed over the next two seasons, winning a total of eight games in Pac-10 play. After starting 6–12 in 2007–08 (including 0–6 in Pac-10 play), John was relieved of his duties on January 20, 2008.

On April 23, 2008, John was announced as a member of Mike Montgomery's staff on the California Golden Bears men's basketball team.

== Personal life ==
John lives with his wife Lisa and their two sons Tyler and Trevor.

== Head coaching record ==
Record table
Season	Team	Overall	Conference	Standing	Postseason
Oregon State (Pacific-10 Conference) (2002–present)
2002–03	Oregon State	13–15	6–12	T-6th	
2003–04	Oregon State	12–16	6–12	9th	
2004–05	Oregon State	17–15	8–10	5th	NIT First Round
2005–06	Oregon State	13–18	5–13	8th	
2006–07	Oregon State	11–21	3–15	9th	
2007–08	Oregon State	6–12	0–6	10th	
Oregon State:		72–97	28–68		
Total:		72–97			
National champion Postseason invitational champion Conference regular season champion Conference regular season and conference tournament champion Division regular season champion Division regular season and conference tournament champion Conference tournament champion
