= 2007–08 Richmond Spiders men's basketball team =

American college basketball season

2007–2008 Richmond Spiders men's basketball

CBI First Round vs. Virginia, L 64–66
- Conference: Atlantic 10 Conference
- Record: 16–15 (9–7 A-10)
- Head coach: Chris Mooney (3rd season)
- Assistant coaches: Kevin McGeehan (3rd season); Carlin Hartman (3rd season); Jamal Brunt (1st season)
- Home arena: Robins Center

2007–08 Atlantic 10 men's basketball standings
	Conf.				Overall
Team	W		L	PCT	W		L	PCT
No. 12 Xavier	14	–	2	.875	30	–	7	.811
Temple †	11	–	5	.688	21	–	13	.618
UMass	10	–	6	.625	25	–	11	.694
Saint Joseph's	9	–	7	.563	21	–	13	.618
Charlotte	9	–	7	.563	20	–	14	.588
Richmond	9	–	7	.563	16	–	15	.516
Dayton	8	–	8	.500	23	–	11	.676
La Salle	8	–	8	.500	15	–	17	.469
Rhode Island	7	–	9	.438	21	–	12	.636
Duquesne	7	–	9	.438	17	–	13	.567
Saint Louis	7	–	9	.438	16	–	15	.516
Fordham	6	–	10	.375	12	–	17	.414
George Washington	5	–	11	.313	9	–	17	.346
St. Bonaventure	2	–	14	.125	8	–	22	.267
† 2008 Atlantic 10 Tournament winner Rankings from AP poll

The 2007–08 Richmond Spiders men's basketball team represented the University of Richmond in National Collegiate Athletic Association (NCAA) Division I college basketball during the 2008–09 season. Richmond competed as a member of the Atlantic 10 Conference (A-10) under third-year head basketball coach Chris Mooney and played its home games at the Robins Center.

== Roster ==
2007–08 Richmond Spiders men's basketball team
Players
Coaches

Pos.	#	Name	Height	Weight	Year	Hometown
G	2	Chris Richard	6 ft 3 in (1.91 m)	175 lb (79 kg)	Fr	Portland, Oregon
G	3	Mark McGonigal	6 ft 0 in (1.83 m)	190 lb (86 kg)	Jr	Absecon, New Jersey
F	4	Jarhon Giddings	6 ft 9 in (2.06 m)	235 lb (107 kg)	RS Jr	Winston-Salem, North Carolina
G	5	David Gonzalvez	6 ft 4 in (1.93 m)	200 lb (91 kg)	So	Marietta, Georgia
G	10	Duncan McLean	6 ft 1 in (1.85 m)	185 lb (84 kg)	Jr	Wilmette, Illinois
F	11	Oumar Sylla	6 ft 7 in (2.01 m)	225 lb (102 kg)	RS Sr	Bamako, Mali
F	12	Kevin Smith	6 ft 5 in (1.96 m)	180 lb (82 kg)	Fr	Murfreesboro, Tennessee
G	13	Chris McClain	6 ft 4 in (1.93 m)	175 lb (79 kg)	Fr	Dallas, Texas
G	14	Kevin Anderson	5 ft 11 in (1.8 m)	165 lb (75 kg)	Fr	Duluth, Georgia
F	15	Gaston Moliva	6 ft 7 in (2.01 m)	240 lb (109 kg)	Sr	Yaoundé, Cameroon
G/F	21	Kevin Hovde	6 ft 5 in (1.96 m)	200 lb (91 kg)	Jr	Kennett Square, Pennsylvania
F	31	Conor Smith	6 ft 8 in (2.03 m)	200 lb (91 kg)	Fr	Brookfield, Wisconsin
F	32	Justin Harper	6 ft 9 in (2.06 m)	210 lb (95 kg)	Fr	Richmond, Virginia
C	41	Dan Geriot	6 ft 9 in (2.06 m)	235 lb (107 kg)	So	Springfield, Pennsylvania
G/F	44	Ryan Butler	6 ft 6 in (1.98 m)	200 lb (91 kg)	RS So	Richmond, Virginia

Head coach

- Chris Mooney (Princeton)

Assistant coach(es)

- Kevin McGeehan (Gettysburg)
- Carlin Hartman (Tulane)
- Jamal Brunt (Randolph-Macon)

Legend

- (C) Team captain
- (S) Suspended
- (I) Ineligible
- (W) Walk-on
- Injured
- Current redshirt

== Schedule ==
Date time, TV	Rank^{#}	Opponent^{#}	Result	Record	Site (attendance) city, state
Regular Season
November 5*; 4:00 pm		vs. Maine; Coaches Vs. Cancer Classic	W 44–42	1–0	FedEx Forum (N/A); Memphis, Tennessee
November 6*; 9:00 pm, ESPNU		at No. 3 Memphis; Coaches Vs. Cancer Classic	L 63–80	1–1	FedEx Forum (16,771); Memphis, Tennessee
November 10*; 7:00 pm		Norfolk State	L 69–72	1–2	Robins Center (4,125); Richmond, Virginia
November 13*; 8:00 pm, Comcast Richmond		at East Carolina	W 67–65 ^{OT}	2–2	Minges Coliseum (4,241); Greenville, North Carolina
November 17*; 7:00 pm		Maryland Baltimore County	L 68–70	2–3	Robins Center (3,850); Richmond, Virginia
November 20*; 8:20 pm		at Rice	W 61–55	3–3	Reliant Arena (756); Houston, Texas
November 24*; 7:30 pm		at Marist	L 62–64	3–4	McCann Field House (2,373); Poughkeepsie, New York
November 28*; 7:00 pm		William & Mary	W 58–55	4–4	Robins Center (2,850); Richmond, Virginia
December 5*; 7:00 pm		South Florida	L 65–79	4–5	Robins Center (3,120); Richmond, Virginia
December 8*; 7:30 pm, CN8		at VCU; Farm Bureau Insurance Black & Blue Classic	L 45–65	4–6	Siegel Center (7,530); Richmond, Virginia
December 19*; 7:00 pm		Old Dominion	W 55–49	5–6	Robins Center (3,350); Richmond, Virginia
December 30*; 6:00 pm		Virginia Military Institute	W 71–69	6–6	Robins Center (4,092); Richmond, Virginia
January 3*; 6:00 pm, CSTV		Virginia Tech; Bank of America Challenge	W 52–49	7–6	Robins Center (4,840); Richmond, Virginia
January 9; 12:00 pm		at La Salle	W 75–74 ^{3OT}	8–6 (1–0)	Tom Gola Arena (2,210); Philadelphia, Pennsylvania
January 12; 7:00 pm		at Saint Joseph's	L 63–81	8–7 (1–1)	Alumni Memorial Fieldhouse (9,847); Philadelphia, Pennsylvania
January 16; 7:00 pm		St. Bonaventure	W 75–64	9–7 (2–1)	Robins Center (3,125); Richmond, Virginia
January 19; 4:00 pm, CSTV (regional)		La Salle	L 67–76	9–8 (2–2)	Robins Center (3,250); Richmond, Virginia
January 26; 7:00 pm		No. 16 Dayton	L 63–80	10–8 (3–2)	Robins Center (7,125); Richmond, Virginia
January 30; 7:00 pm, Cox Sports		at Rhode Island	L 64–78	10–9 (3–3)	Ryan Center (5,835); Kingston, Rhode Island
February 2; 3:00 pm, Time Warner Cable		at Charlotte	W 64–58	11–9 (4–3)	Halton Arena (9,105); Charlotte, North Carolina
February 6; 7:00 pm		Temple	W 64–58	12–9 (5–3)	Robins Center (3,560); Richmond, Virginia
February 10; 2:00 pm, KPLR-TV		Saint Louis	L 55–64	12–10 (5–4)	Robins Center (5,105); Richmond, Virginia
February 16; 7:00 pm		at Duquesne	W 69–66	13–10 (6–4)	A.J. Palumbo Center (3,943); Pittsburgh, Pennsylvania
February 20; 7:00 pm		Charlotte	W 79–76 ^{OT}	14–10 (7–4)	Robins Center (3,253); Richmond, Virginia
February 23; 2:00 pm		at George Washington	L 53–59	14–11 (7–5)	Smith Center (3,129); Washington, D.C.
February 27; 7:00 pm		at St. Bonaventure	W 82–71	15–11 (8–5)	Reilly Center (2,559); St. Bonaventure, New York
March 1; 7:00 pm		Massachusetts	L 74–78	15–12 (8–6)	Robins Center (5,074); Richmond, Virginia
March 5; 7:00 pm		Fordham	W 58–53	16–12 (9–6)	Robins Center (3,149); Richmond, Virginia
March 8; 7:00 pm, Fox Sports Ohio		at No. 8 Xavier	L 61–86	16–13 (9–7)	Cintas Center (10,250); Cincinnati, Ohio
2008 Atlantic 10 men's basketball tournament
March 13; 2:45 pm, CSN Mid-Atlantic		vs. Saint Joseph's; First Round	L 47–61	16–14	Boardwalk Hall (4,401); Atlantic City, New Jersey
2008 College Basketball Invitational
March 18*; 7:00 pm, Fox College Sports		at Virginia; First Round	L 64–66	16–15	John Paul Jones Arena (4,022); Charlottesville, Virginia
*Non-conference game. ^{#}Rankings from AP Poll. (#) Tournament seedings in parentheses. All times are in Eastern Time.
