= 2007–08 Drexel Dragons men's basketball team =

American college basketball season

2007–08 Drexel Dragons men's basketball
- Conference: Colonial Athletic Association
- Record: 12–20 (5–13 CAA)
- Head coach: Bruiser Flint (7th season)
- Home arena: Daskalakis Athletic Center

2007–08 CAA men's basketball standings
	Conf.				Overall
Team	W		L	PCT	W		L	PCT
VCU	15	–	3	.833	24	–	8	.750
UNC Wilmington	12	–	6	.667	20	–	13	.606
George Mason †	12	–	6	.667	23	–	11	.676
Old Dominion	11	–	7	.611	18	–	16	.529
William & Mary	10	–	8	.556	17	–	16	.515
Northeastern	9	–	9	.500	14	–	17	.452
Delaware	9	–	9	.500	14	–	17	.452
Hofstra	8	–	10	.444	12	–	18	.400
Towson	7	–	11	.389	13	–	18	.419
Drexel	5	–	13	.278	12	–	20	.375
James Madison	5	–	13	.278	13	–	17	.433
Georgia State	5	–	13	.278	9	–	21	.300
† 2008 CAA tournament winner Rankings from AP poll

The 2007–08 Drexel Dragons men's basketball team represented Drexel University during the 2007–08 NCAA Division I men's basketball season. The Dragons, led by 7th year head coach Bruiser Flint, played their home games at the Daskalakis Athletic Center and were members of the Colonial Athletic Association.

== Roster ==
2007–08 Drexel Dragons men's basketball team
Players
Coaches

Pos.	#	Name	Height	Weight	Year	Previous school	Hometown
G	0	Tramayne Hawthorne	6 ft 0 in (1.83 m)	180 lb (82 kg)	Jr	Steelton-Highspire	Steelton, PA
G	1	Bobby Jordan	6 ft 0 in (1.83 m)	180 lb (82 kg)	Jr	Roman Catholic HS	Philadelphia, PA
G	3	Scott Rodgers	6 ft 3 in (1.91 m)	200 lb (91 kg)	Jr	Central HS	Philadelphia, PA
G	11	Gerald Colds	5 ft 11 in (1.8 m)	160 lb (73 kg)	Fr	St. Raymond's	New York, NY
G	12	Rob Hampton	6 ft 4 in (1.93 m)	200 lb (91 kg)	So	Christ the King HS	Queens, NY
F	13	Yannick Formbor	6 ft 8 in (2.03 m)	255 lb (116 kg)	RS Fr	St. Patrick's	Roselle, NJ
G	14	Bill Lally	6 ft 0 in (1.83 m)	170 lb (77 kg)	So	Roman Catholic HS	Philadelphia, PA
G	15	Frank Elegar	6 ft 9 in (2.06 m)	225 lb (102 kg)	Sr	St. Raymond's	Bronx, NY
G	23	Jamie Harris	5 ft 10 in (1.78 m)	165 lb (75 kg)	Fr	Wings Academy	New York, NY
G	24	Adrian Hynes-Guery	6 ft 4 in (1.93 m)	185 lb (84 kg)	Fr	Dawson College	Montreal, Quebec
F	25	Randy Oveneke	6 ft 7 in (2.01 m)	225 lb (102 kg)	Sr	Saint Anna College	Antwerpen, Belgium
G	30	Chris Mohl	6 ft 3 in (1.91 m)	180 lb (82 kg)	Jr	Bishop McDevitt HS	Philadelphia, PA
F	33	Evan Neisler	6 ft 8 in (2.03 m)	215 lb (98 kg)	RS So	Boston College	Raleigh, NC
G	34	Lance Feurtado	6 ft 5 in (1.96 m)	190 lb (86 kg)	So	Uniondale HS	Uniondale, NY
F	42	Kenny Tribbett	6 ft 9 in (2.06 m)	250 lb (113 kg)	RS So	Chester (Pa.)	Berlin, NJ
F	44	Stuart Cameron	6 ft 8 in (2.03 m)	235 lb (107 kg)	So	Wilmington Charter	Wilmington, DE

Head coach

- James "Bruiser" Flint (Saint Joseph's)

Assistant coach(es)

Legend

- (C) Team captain
- (S) Suspended
- (I) Ineligible
- (W) Walk-on
- Injured
- Current redshirt

Roster

== Schedule ==
Date time, TV	Rank^{#}	Opponent^{#}	Result	Record	High points	High rebounds	High assists	Site (attendance) city, state
Exhibition
November 1, 2007*; 7:00 pm		Holy Family	W 88–79	1–0	23 – Elegar	9 – Elegar	9 – Harris	Daskalakis Athletic Center; Philadelphia, PA
Regular season
November 9, 2007*; 7:00 pm		at Penn; Battle of 33rd Street	W 67–59 ^{OT}	1–0	18 – Tied	11 – Elegar	4 – Tied	Palestra (6,656); Philadelphia, PA
November 11, 2007*; 4:00 pm		Navy; Philly Classic	W 86–70	2–0	24 – Elegar	14 – Elegar	4 – Rodgers	Daskalakis Athletic Center (2,119); Philadelphia, PA
November 14, 2007*; 7:00 pm		at Florida Gulf Coast	W 77–58	3–0	22 – Hawthorne	7 – Rodgers	6 – Hawthorne	Alico Arena (3,216); Fort Myers, FL
November 20, 2007*; 8:00 pm, CN8		at No. 23 Virginia; Philly Classic	L 58–72	3–1	23 – Elegar	7 – Oveneke	3 – Tied	John Paul Jones Arena (10,975); Charlottesville, VA
November 23, 2007*; 2:00 pm		vs. Robert Morris; Philly Classic	W 56–40	4–1	14 – Colds	10 – Elegar	5 – Hawthorne	Palestra (1,073); Philadelphia, PA
November 24, 2007*; 2:00 pm, CN8		vs. Loyola (MD); Philly Classic	W 54–52	5–1	21 – Elegar	5 – Oveneke	5 – Hawthorne	Palestra (1,038); Philadelphia, PA
November 29, 2007; 7:00 pm, CSN		at George Mason	L 38–85	5–2 (0–1)	11 – Hawthorne	6 – Formbor	4 – Hawthorne	EagleBank Arena (7,121); Fairfax, VA
December 1, 2007*; 4:30 pm, CN8		Creighton	L 38–85	5–3	12 – Hawthorne	6 – Oveneke	2 – Tied	Daskalakis Athletic Center (2,532); Philadelphia, PA
December 8, 2007*; 7:00 pm		Toledo	L 44–57	5–4	12 – Elegar	8 – Elegar	3 – Oveneke	Daskalakis Athletic Center (3,901); Philadelphia, PA
December 15, 2007*; 12:00 pm, ESPNU		vs. Temple	L 51–64	5–5	18 – Elegar	12 – Elegar	4 – Tied	Palestra (3,254); Philadelphia, PA
December 22, 2007*; 6:00 pm, CN8		Bucknell	W 65–53	6–5	18 – Rodgers	5 – Tied	6 – Harris	Daskalakis Athletic Center (2,011); Philadelphia, PA
December 27, 2007*; 7:30 pm		Rider	W 73–66	7–5	15 – Hawthorne	10 – Elegar	6 – Tied	Daskalakis Athletic Center (1,787); Philadelphia, PA
December 31, 2007*; 6:00 pm, CN8		vs. Saint Joseph's	L 51–69	7–6	18 – Oveneke	8 – Elegar	4 – Rodgers	Palestra (5,284); Philadelphia, PA
CAA Regular Season
January 2, 2008; 7:00 pm, MASN		UNC Wilmington	W 70–60	8–6 (1–1)	21 – Elegar	11 – Elegar	4 – Hawthorne	Daskalakis Athletic Center (912); Philadelphia, PA
January 5, 2008; 4:00 pm		Delaware	L 63–67	8–7 (1–2)	33 – Elegar	17 – Elegar	5 – Hampton	Daskalakis Athletic Center (2,237); Philadelphia, PA
January 9, 2008; 7:00 pm		at Northeastern	L 45–79	8–8 (1–3)	11 – Oveneke	7 – Oveneke	3 – Hampton	Matthews Arena (1,782); Boston, MA
January 12, 2008; 4:30 pm, CN8		at Towson	L 77–86	8–9 (1–4)	29 – Elegar	11 – Elegar	5 – Rodgers	Towson Center (1,923); Towson, MD
January 16, 2008; 7:30 pm, CN8		Georgia State	W 58–51	9–9 (2–4)	23 – Hawthorne	6 – Elegar	5 – Rodgers	Daskalakis Athletic Center (1,132); Philadelphia, PA
January 19, 2008; 12:00 pm, CSN		Hofstra	L 58–67	9–10 (2–5)	23 – Elegar	13 – Elegar	6 – Hawthorne	Daskalakis Athletic Center (2,083); Philadelphia, PA
January 23, 2008; 12:00 pm		William & Mary	L 72–73 ^{OT}	9–11 (2–6)	24 – Elegar	15 – Elegar	4 – Tied	Daskalakis Athletic Center (1,027); Philadelphia, PA
January 26, 2008; 6:00 pm, CN8		at Virginia Commonwealth	L 62–76	9–12 (2–7)	15 – Hampton	5 – Tied	5 – Hampton	Stuart C. Siegel Center (7,506); Richmond, VA
January 30, 2008; 7:30 pm		at Georgia State	L 58–64	9–13 (2–8)	17 – Hawthorne	6 – Oveneke	3 – Tied	GSU Sports Arena (1,122); Atlanta, GA
February 2, 2008; 5:00 pm, CN8		Northeastern	L 40–63	9–14 (2–9)	12 – Tied	13 – Oveneke	4 – Rodgers	Daskalakis Athletic Center (1,918); Philadelphia, PA
February 7, 2008; 7:00 pm, ESPNU		George Mason	L 65–75	9–15 (2–10)	18 – Rodgers	11 – Elegar	7 – Hampton	Daskalakis Athletic Center (1,838); Philadelphia, PA
February 9, 2008; 4:00 pm		Towson	W 65–51	10–15 (3–10)	13 – Tied	8 – Tied	3 – Tied	Daskalakis Athletic Center (1,981); Philadelphia, PA
February 14, 2008; 7:00 pm, ESPNU		at Old Dominion	L 71–75 ^{2OT}	10–16 (3–11)	21 – Hawthorne	9 – Elegar	4 – Tied	Ted Constant Convocation Center (5,822); Norfolk, VA
February 16, 2008; 2:00 pm		at Delaware	W 62–60	11–16 (4–11)	22 – Elegar	11 – Elegar	4 – Colds	Bob Carpenter Center (3,834); Newark, DE
February 20, 2008; 7:00 pm		at William & Mary	L 50–57	11–17 (4–12)	14 – Hawthorne	7 – Oveneke	3 – Tied	Kaplan Arena (2,446); Williamsburg, VA
February 23, 2008*; 4:00 pm		Fairfield	L 51–60	11–18	12 – Oveneke	6 – Tied	4 – Hawthorne	Daskalakis Athletic Center (1,032); Philadelphia, PA
February 27, 2008; 7:30 pm		James Madison	W 70–67	12–18 (5–12)	14 – Hampton	12 – Elegar	8 – Harris	Daskalakis Athletic Center (1,117); Philadelphia, PA
March 1, 2008; 12:00 pm, CN8		at Hofstra	L 48–56	12–19 (5–13)	13 – Tied	7 – Elegar	4 – Rodgers	Hofstra Arena (2,976); Hempstead, NY
CAA tournament
March 7, 2008; 6:00 pm	(10)	vs. (7) Delaware	L 51–60	12–20	15 – Elegar	7 – Oveneke	4 – Hawthorne	Richmond Coliseum (5,381); Richmond, VA
*Non-conference game. ^{#}Rankings from AP. (#) Tournament seedings in parentheses. All times are in Eastern Time.

== Awards ==
Gerald Colds

- CAA Rookie of the Week

Frank Elegar

- CAA All-Conference Second Team
- CAA All-Defensive Team
- CAA Player of the Week
