= Saint Joseph's Hawks men's basketball =

Men's basketball team

2026–27 Saint Joseph's Hawks men's basketball team
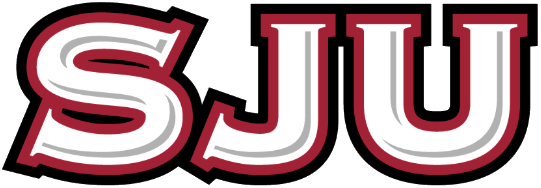
- University: Saint Joseph's University
- Head coach: Steve Donahue (2nd season)
- Location: Philadelphia, Pennsylvania, U.S.
- Arena: Hagan Arena (capacity: 4,200)
- Conference: Atlantic 10
- Nickname: Hawks
- Colors: Crimson and gray

NCAA Division I tournament Final Four
- 1961
Other NCAA Division I tournament results
Elite Eight	1961, 1963, 1981, 2004
Sweet Sixteen	1959, 1960, 1961, 1962, 1963, 1965, 1966, 1981, 1997, 2004
Appearances	1959, 1960, 1961, 1962, 1963, 1965, 1966, 1969, 1971, 1973, 1974, 1981, 1982, 1986, 1997, 2001, 2003, 2004, 2008, 2014, 2016

Conference tournament champions
- 1981, 1982, 1986, 1997, 2014, 2016

Conference regular-season champions
- 1959, 1960, 1961, 1962, 1963, 1965, 1966, 1970, 1971, 1973, 1974, 1976, 1980, 1986, 1997, 2001, 2002, 2003, 2004, 2005

Conference division champions
- 1997

Uniforms
Home	Away

The Saint Joseph's Hawks men's basketball team represents Saint Joseph's University in Philadelphia, Pennsylvania. The program is classified in the NCAA's Division I, and the team competes in the Atlantic 10 Conference. Saint Joseph's competes as well as part of the Philadelphia Big 5. Their home court is the Hagan Arena. The team is led by head coach Steve Donahue.

Through the years they have produced a number of NBA players. Saint Joseph's primary rivalry is with the Villanova Wildcats. Other rivals include the Temple Owls, the La Salle Explorers, the Penn Quakers, who make up the rest of the Big 5. Saint Joseph's basketball program was ranked 43rd best of all time by Smith & Street's magazine in 2005.

== History ==
Men's basketball is the most popular sport at Saint Joseph's University. The Hawks have competed in 21 NCAA Tournaments and 16 NIT Tournaments. Throughout the school's history, 29 different players have been drafted into the NBA. The Hawks have been ranked 77 times in their history, 51 of which have been in the top 10. The Hawks appeared in 11 NCAA Tournaments between 1959 and 1974. They were coached by Hall of Fame coach "Dr. Jack" Ramsay from 1955 to 1966. Ramsay compiled a 234–72 record in his 11 years at Saint Joseph's. They reached the Final Four in 1961 (although their 1961 third-place finish was later revoked by the NCAA). Ramsay went on to coach several NBA teams and won the 1977 NBA Championship.

Jack McKinney took over after Ramsay left and led the Hawks to four more NCAA tournaments between 1969 and 1974.

Following the 1974 season, the Hawks, with 11 fellow larger schools from the Middle Atlantic Conference, formed the new East Coast Conference.

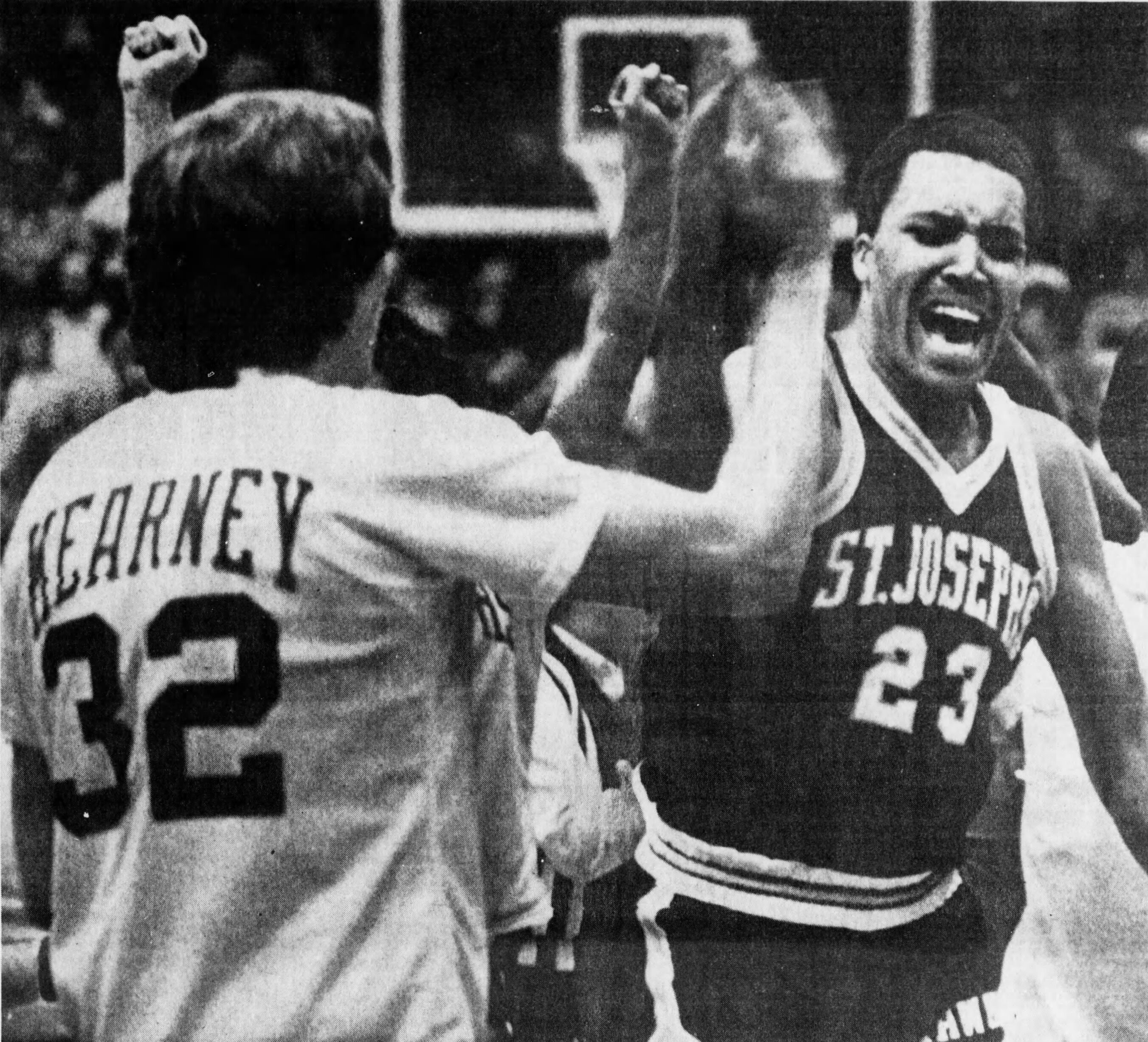
Bob Kearney and Tony Costner celebrate their upset win over 1-seed DePaul at the 1981 NCAA tournament.

In 1980–81, the Hawks, led by coach Jim Lynam, finished in second place in ECC play and won the ECC Tournament to receive a bid to the NCAA tournament. As a #9 seed, the Hawks defeated Creighton in the first round and upset the #1 seeded and #1 ranked DePaul to reach the Sweet Sixteen. The Hawks defeated Boston College to advance to the Elite Eight before losing to eventual national champion Indiana. Lynam also left the Hawks to enjoy a long career as a coach and executive in the NBA.

Saint Joseph's joined the Atlantic 10 Conference prior to the 1982–83 season.

The Hawks' basketball program has also produced several NBA coaches. The first St. Joseph's player to become a professional team coach was George Senesky, who led the Philadelphia Warriors from 1955 to 1958. When Jack Ramsay left Saint Joseph's in 1968 he became the head coach of the Philadelphia 76ers. Ramsey then coached the Buffalo Braves from 1972 to 1976 before moving to the Portland Trail Blazers where he won the NBA championship in 1977. This victory upset the favored 76ers who featured Julius Erving and George McGinnis. From Portland he moved on to coach the Indiana Pacers from 1986 to 1988, after which he retired.

Another noted St. Joseph alum who coached for many years in the NBA was Jack McKinney. Coach McKinney, who followed Dr. Ramsey as the Hawks' head coach, left St. Joseph's to become an assistant head coach for the Milwaukee Bucks for two years before joining Dr. Ramsey at Portland. In 1979, coach McKinney was selected as the head coach of the Los Angeles Lakers. His tenure in LA lasted only 14 games when he suffered major injuries in a bicycle accident. Assistant Head Coach and another St. Joe alum Paul Westhead took over for the injured McKinney and led LA to the NBA Championship. He stayed with the Lakers for three years and left to coach the Chicago Bulls and then the Denver Nuggets. He left Denver and became an assistant coach for three other NBA teams retiring in 2009. Following recovery from his injuries and with the success of Coach Westhead with the Lakers, McKinney took the head coaching job at the Indiana Pacers. After four successful years with Indiana, Coach McKinney ended his career in a nine-game stint with the Kansas City Kings.

Hawk basketball standout Jim Lynam started his NBA coaching career in 1981 as an assistant in Portland. Two years later he got his first head coaching job with the San Diego/Los Angeles Clippers. After two years in the West Coach Lynam came back home to Philadelphia to be an assistant with 76ers and in 1987 he was named the team's head coach. He remained in that position for five years before leaving to coach the Washington Bullets. In 1987 he left head coaching to become an assistant for three NBA teams before retiring in 2010.

Jim O'Brien began his NBA coaching career in 1987 as an assistant with the New York Knicks and then two years later the Boston Celtics. In 2001, he was named the Celtics head coach and stayed through part of the 2004 season. A year later he was at the helm of the 76ers then left for a four-year stint with the Pacers. He finished his coaching career as an assistant for three teams, retiring in 2017.

Matty Guokas, a successful NBA player in his own right, became an assistant coach of the 76ers in 1983. He went on to coach Philadelphia from 1985 to 1988. He then left the Sixers and took the head coaching position with the Orlando Magic and retired after four seasons.

=== Perfect regular season ===
The 2003–2004 Saint Joseph's University Hawks were the last Division I college basketball team to finish the regular season undefeated before the Wichita State Shockers did so in 2013–14 . Saint Joseph's ended the regular season with a 27–0 record and secured a #1 national ranking and a #1 seed in the NCAA tournament. The Hawks were led by a backcourt of Jameer Nelson and Delonte West, both of whom were drafted in the 1st round of the 2004 NBA draft. The Hawks advanced to the Elite Eight with wins over Liberty, Texas Tech, and #17 Wake Forest. In the Elite Eight, they lost to Oklahoma State 64–62.

Nelson was named National Player of the Year while coach Phil Martelli was named Coach of the Year.

In 2009, the 2004 Hawks were named the best single-season team of the decade by Sports Illustrated.

=== Current era ===
The 2004–05 team attempted to repeat the prior year's success without its two star players. The Hawks again won the A-10, but lost the A-10 tournament championship to George Washington and failed to receive a bid to the NCAA tournament. However, they did receive a bid to the NIT and advanced to the Championship game before losing to South Carolina, 60–57.

The Hawks were able to repeat their trip to the NIT in 2006, but the Hawks lost in the second round to Hofstra.

The 2007–08 team finished in 4th place in A-10 play with a 21–13 record. They lost to Temple in the A-10 tournament and received an at-large bid to the NCAA tournament. There, they lost to Oklahoma in the First Round.

The Hawks made trips to the NIT in 2012 and 2013, losing in the first round both years.

The 2013–14 Hawks finished the season with a 24–10 record and a third-place finish in A-10 play. The Hawks won the A-10 tournament by beating #23 VCU and earned the school's first bid since 2008 to the NCAA tournament. The Hawks lost to eventual National Champions, Connecticut, in the Second Round (formerly the First Round).

Following the NCAA appearance in 2014, the Hawks looked to build on their success in 2014–15, but suffered a setback, finishing the season with 13–18 record.

The most recent appearance in the NCAA Tournament came in 2016. The 2015–16 team finished the season with a 28–8 record, a game out of first place in A-10 play. DeAndre' Bembry was named A-10 Player of the Year. The Hawks won the A-10 tournament for the fourth time by defeating VCU. The Hawks were awarded a #8 seed in the NCAA Tournament and defeated 9 seed Cincinnati in the First Round before losing to 1 seed Oregon.

The Hawks won the inaugural Big 5 Classic in 2023, defeating Temple 74-65. St. Joe's went 2-0 in "pool play" defeating Penn 69-61, and defeating 18th ranked Villanova in the Holy War 78-65. This was the Hawks' 21st Big 5 Championship and 10th outright.

== Postseason ==
=== NCAA tournament results ===
The Hawks have appeared in the NCAA tournament 21 times (with one vacated appearance). Their combined record is 19–25. The 1961 appearance was subsequently vacated.

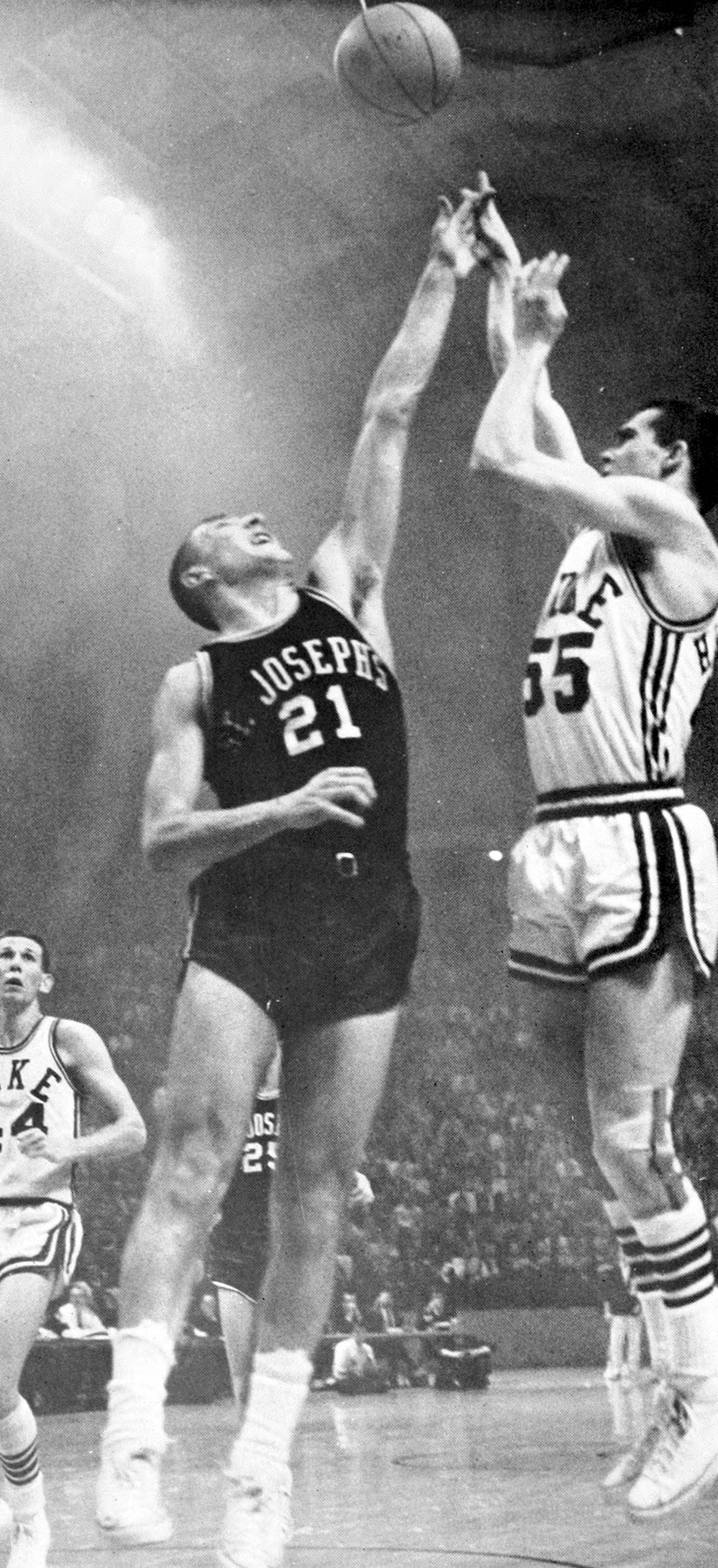
St. Joseph's (dark uniform) vs Duke game of 1962–63 season

Year	Seed	Round	Opponent	Result
1959		Sweet Sixteen; Regional 3rd Place Game	West Virginia; Navy	L 92–95; L 56–70
1960		Sweet Sixteen; Regional 3rd Place Game	Duke; West Virginia	L 56–58; L 100–106
1961		Sweet Sixteen; Elite Eight; Final Four; National 3rd Place Game	Princeton; Wake Forest; Ohio State; Utah	W 72–67; W 96–86; L 69–95; W 127–120^{4OT}
1962		Sweet Sixteen; Regional 3rd Place Game	Wake Forest; NYU	L 85–96^{OT} L 85–94
1963		First Round; Sweet Sixteen; Elite Eight	Princeton; West Virginia; Duke	W 82–81^{OT} W 97–88; L 59–73
1965		First Round; Sweet Sixteen; Regional 3rd Place Game	Connecticut; Providence; NC State	W 67–61; L 73–81^{OT} L 81–103
1966		First Round; Sweet Sixteen; Regional 3rd Place Game	Providence; Duke; Davidson	W 65–48; L 74–76; W 92–76
1969		First Round	Duquesne	L 52–74
1971		First Round	Villanova	L 75–93
1973		First Round	Providence	L 76–86
1974		First Round	Pittsburgh	L 42–54
1981	#9	First Round; Second Round; Sweet Sixteen; Elite Eight	#8 Creighton #1 DePaul #5 Boston College #3 Indiana	W 59–57; W 49–48; W 42–41; L 46–78
1982	#6	First Round	#11 Northeastern	L 62–63
1986	#6	First Round; Second Round	#11 Richmond #14 Cleveland State	W 60–59; L 69–75
1997	#4	First Round; Second Round; Sweet Sixteen	#13 Pacific #5 Boston College #1 Kentucky	W 75–65; W 81–77^{OT} L 68–83
2001	#9	First Round; Second Round	#8 Georgia Tech #1 Stanford	W 66–62; L 83–90
2003	#7	First Round	#10 Auburn	L 63–65^{OT}
2004	#1	First Round; Second Round; Sweet Sixteen; Elite Eight	#16 Liberty #8 Texas Tech #4 Wake Forest #2 Oklahoma State	W 82–63; W 70–65; W 84–80; L 62–64
2008	#11	First Round	#6 Oklahoma	L 64–72
2014	#10	Second Round	#7 Connecticut	L 81–89^{OT}
2016	#8	First Round; Second Round	#9 Cincinnati #1 Oregon	W 78–76; L 64–69

=== NIT results ===
The Hawks have appeared in the National Invitation Tournament (NIT) 19 times. Their combined record is 18–18.

Year	Round	Opponent	Result
1956	Quarterfinals; Semifinals; 3rd Place Game	Seton Hall; Louisville; St. Francis (NY)	W 74–65; L 79–89; W 93–82
1958	First Round; Quarterfinals	Saint Peter's; St. Bonaventure	W 83–76; L 75–79
1964	First Round; Quarterfinals	Miami (FL); Bradley	W 86–76; L 81–83
1972	First Round	Maryland	L 55–67
1979	First Round	Ohio State	L 66–80
1980	First Round	Texas	L 61–70
1984	First Round	Boston College	L 63–75
1985	First Round; Second Round	Missouri; Virginia	W 68–67; L 61–68
1993	First Round	Southwest Missouri State	L 34–56
1995	First Round	Coppin State	L 68–75
1996	First Round; Second Round; Quarterfinals; Semifinals; Finals	Iona; Providence; Rhode Island; Alabama; Nebraska	W 82–78; W 82–62; W 76–59; W 74–69; L 56–60
2002	Opening Round; First Round	George Mason; Ball State	W 73–64; L 65–75
2005	Opening Round; First Round; Second Round; Quarterfinals; Semifinals; Finals	Hofstra; Buffalo; Holy Cross; Texas A&M; Memphis; South Carolina	W 53–44; W 55–50; W 68–60; W 58–51; W 70–58; L 57–60
2006	First Round; Second Round	Rutgers; Hofstra	W 71–62; L 75–77
2012	First Round	Northern Iowa	L 65–67
2013	First Round	St. John's	L 61–63
2024	First Round	Seton Hall	L 72–75
2025	First Round	UAB	L 65–69
2026	First Round; Second Round; Quarterfinals	Colorado State; California; New Mexico	W 69–64; W 76–75; L 84-69

== Rivals ==
The main rival has been the Villanova University Wildcats which is locally referred to as the Holy War. Saint Joseph's also has a heated rivalry with the Temple University Owls, the La Salle University Explorers, and the University of Pennsylvania Quakers. Because games against Drexel University are in-city, the two teams are sometimes considered rivals but Saint Joseph's leads the all-time series 43–6. The all-time series between La Salle and the Hawks is 63–49 in SJU's favor. They are losing the all-time series against Temple 63–75, Villanova 25–50, and winning the series with Penn 45–32.

== Traditions ==
Fans of the Hawks often chant "The Hawk Will Never Die!". In a September 2003 issue, Sports Illustrated listed that cheer among The 100 Things You Gotta Do Before You Graduate (Whatever the Cost), calling it "the most defiant cheer in college sports".

- Midnight Madness The first men's varsity basketball practice, Midnight Madness is an event which allows students and fans to attend. Players entertain the crowd by putting on events such as slam dunk contests.

- The Drum It is believed the Drum played a significant role in many important wins. The Drum leads the student section during fight songs and chants. Today this tradition lives on with a new generation of drummers.

- Rollouts During Big 5 match-ups, each student section prepares written messages on large rollouts that are passed down the crowd.

- The Double Dip Anytime the Saint Joseph's Hawks win the same day or night the Villanova Wildcats lose. The ultimate double dip occurs when the Hawks beat the Wildcats.

- Fight Songs 'When the Hawks Go Flying In' is sung before every game and 'Mine Eyes' is sung immediately after every game regardless of the outcome.

- Cheers Cheers include "Let's go St. Joe's!" and of course "The Hawk Will Never Die!" which is reserved for the end of games.

- 54th Airborne The student section at SJU basketball games is known for being deafening. At Hagan Arena there are about 1,200 seats for students (over 1/4 of the total seating). The section, along with the pep band, leads the cheers for the rest of the crowd. In order to formalize the student section, the 54th Airborne was created in 2010 by Bryan Keister '12. The name is derived from the location of Hagan Arena at the corner of 54th St and City Ave, and while Airborne is appropriate for a Hawk mascot it also pays hommage to the military focused second place mascot name from student led voting in 1929, "Grenadiers". The core members of the 54th Airborne continue to make up the Student Booster Club. These students work to come up with the rollouts for Big 5 games.

== Retired numbers ==
The Hawks have retired four numbers for seven players, with No. 4 retired in honor of four players:

Saint Joseph's Hawks retired numbers
No.	Player	Career	Ref.
4	George Senesky	1939–1943	
4	Paul Senesky	1947–1950	
4	Jim Lynam	1960–1963	
4	Billy Oakes	1963–1966	
14	Jameer Nelson	2000–2004	
30	Cliff Anderson	1964–1967	
44	Mike Bantom	1970–1973	

== Accolades and achievements ==
- In 2004, the Hawks—as Atlantic 10 East Division champions—were one of the three inaugural-year recipients of the Pride of Philadelphia Award from the Philadelphia Sports Hall of Fame.
- In 2005, the Saint Joseph's University men's basketball team was ranked 43rd best of all time by Smith & Street's magazine.
- In 2009, the 2004 Hawks were named the best single-season team of the decade (2000–2009) by Sports Illustrated.
- The Hawks have won seven Atlantic 10 regular season titles and four A-10 tournament championships and rank 33rd all-time in wins with 1,439 and 44th all-time with a .605 winning percentage.
- Saint Joseph's recently ranked 57th in the "Prestige Rankings" of the best programs since 1985 by ESPN.

== Notable players ==
=== NBA Draftees ===
- 1947 – Round 2, Pick 16: Norman Butz (Philadelphia Warriors)
- 1950 – Round 4, Pick 39: Paul Senesky (Philadelphia Warriors)
- 1953 – Round 11, Pick 88: John Doogan (Philadelphia Warriors)
- 1957 – Round 4, Pick 2: Kurt Engelbert (Detroit Pistons)
- 1957 – Round 4, Pick 6: Ray Radziszewski (Philadelphia Warriors)
- 1959 – Round 6, Pick 3: Joe Spratt (Philadelphia Warriors)
- 1960 – Round 3, Pick 3: Bob McNeill (New York Knicks)
- 1960 – Round 7, Pick 7: Bob Clarke (Philadelphia Warriors)
- 1960 – Round 9, Pick 69: Joe Gallo (Philadelphia Warriors)
- 1961 – Round 3, Pick 6: Jack Egan (Philadelphia Warriors)
- 1961 – Round 15, Pick 1: Vince Kempton (New York Knicks)
- 1964 – Round 3, Pick 8: Steve Courtin (Cincinnati Royals)
- 1966 – Round 1, Pick 9: Matt Guokas (Philadelphia 76ers)
- 1966 – Round 5, Pick 9: Tom Duff (Philadelphia 76ers)
- 1967 – Round 4, Pick 4: Cliff Anderson (Los Angeles Lakers)
- 1967 – Round 8, Pick 11: Al Grundy (San Diego Rockets)
- 1970 – Round 9, Pick 12: Mike Hauer (Philadelphia 76ers)
- 1973 – Round 1, Pick 8: Mike Bantom (Phoenix Suns)
- 1973 – Round 2, Pick 10: Pat McFarland (New York Knicks)
- 1980 – Round 9, Pick 19: Luke Griffin (Philadelphia 76ers)
- 1981 – Round 8, Pick 15: John Smith (Portland Trail Blazers)
- 1982 – Round 2, Pick 2: Bryan Warrick (Washington Bullets)
- 1982 – Round 6, Pick 8: Jeff Clark (Indiana Pacers)
- 1982 – Round 9, Pick 11: Mark Dearborn (Portland Trail Blazers)
- 1984 – Round 2, Pick 10: Tony Costner (Washington Bullets)
- 1984 – Round 3, Pick 19: Kevin Springman (Detroit Pistons)
- 1985 – Round 5, Pick 5: Bob Lojewski (Sacramento Kings)
- 1986 – Round 1, Pick 16: Mo Martin (Denver Nuggets)
- 1987 – Round 7, Pick 3: Wayne Williams (New York Knicks)
- 2004 – Round 1, Pick 20: Jameer Nelson (Orlando Magic)
- 2004 – Round 1, Pick 24: Delonte West (Boston Celtics)
- 2009 – Round 2, Pick 26: Ahmad Nivins (Dallas Mavericks)
- 2016 – Round 1, Pick 21: DeAndre' Bembry (Atlanta Hawks)
- 2025 - Round 2, Pick 31: Rasheer Fleming (Minnesota Timberwolves)

=== Active professional players ===
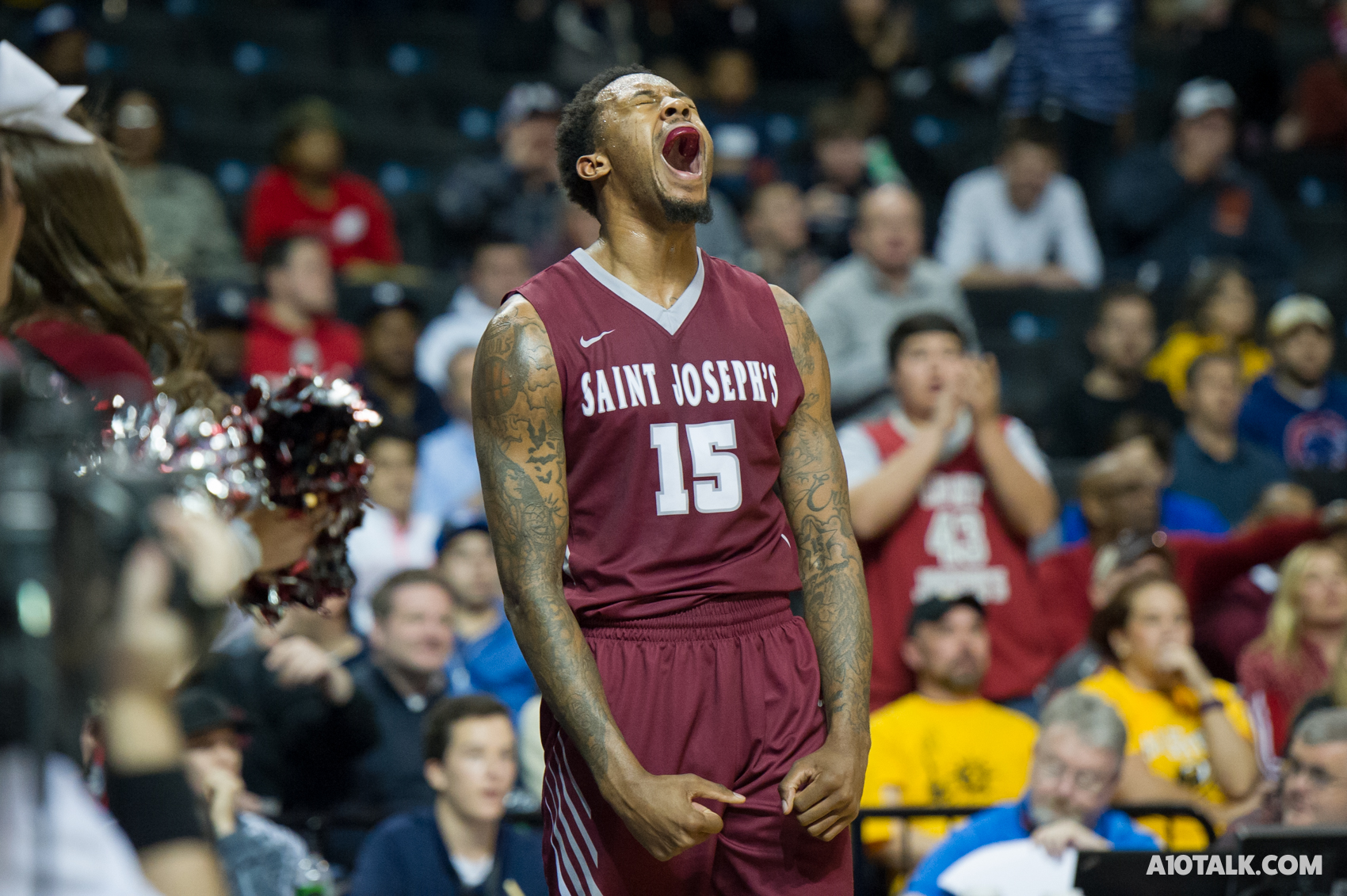
Isaiah Miles

- C. J. Aiken - Taoyuan Pauian Archiland (Taiwan - Super Basketball League)
- DeAndre Bembry - Milwaukee Bucks (NBA)
- Charlie Brown Jr. - New York Knicks (NBA)
- Langston Galloway - Atlanta
- Darrin Govens - Cholet Basket (France - LNBA Pro A)
- Jordan Hall - San Antonio Spurs (NBA)
- Carl Jones, "Tay" - Mineros (Mexico)
- Isaiah Miles - Hapoel Tel Aviv (Israeli Basketball Premier League)
- Garrett Williamson - London Lightning (Canada - NBLC)

== Men's basketball in Saint Joseph's athletics Hall of Fame ==
- Cliff Anderson (1999, Men's Basketball, '67)
- Mike Bantom (2000, Men's Basketball, '73)
- Rodney Blake (2001, Men's Basketball, '88)
- Tony Costner (1989, Men's Basketball, '84)
- Harry Booth (2006, Baseball/Men's Basketball '62)
- Kurt Engelbert (1976, Men's Basketball ‘57)
- Bill Ferguson (2006, Men's Basketball)
- James "Bruiser" Flint (1998, Men's Basketball, '87)
- Matt Guokas Jr. (2000, Men's Basketball, '67)
- Mike Hauer (2011, Men's Basketball, '70)
- The Hawk (1999, Mascot, '56)
- Dan Kelly (2011, Men's Basketball, '70)
- Jim Lynam (2003, Men's Basketball, '63)
- Maurice Martin (2006, Men's Basketball, '86)
- Paul McDermitt (2006, Baseball/Men's Basketball/Golf/Track, '59)
- Pat McFarland (2005, Men's Basketball, '73)
- Jack McKinney (2004, Men's Basketball/Track, '57)
- Bob McNeill (2001, Men's Basketball, '60)
- Mighty Mites (2000, Men's Basketball, 1934–38)
- Jameer Nelson (2011, Men's Basketball, '04)
- Ahmad Nivins (2018, Men's Basketball, '09)
- Marvin O'Connor (2008, Men's Basketball, '02)
- Jack Ramsay (1999, Men's Basketball, '49)
- George Senesky (1999, Men's Basketball, '43)
- Joe Spratt (2002, Men's Basketball, '59)
- Tom Wynne (2003, Men's Basketball/Baseball. '63)

== Current coaching staff ==
- Steve Donahue – Head Coach (2025)
- John Griffin III – Assistant Coach (2019)
- Justin Scott – Assistant Coach (2019)
- John Linehan – Assistant Coach (2022)
- Eric Lang - Head Strength and Conditioning Coach (2019)
- Amanda Casale - Director of Men's Basketball Operations (2019)
- Thomas Boyle - Director of Scouting and Analytics (2019)
- Reggie Cameron - Graduate Manager (2019)
- Michelle Thomas - Program Services Specialist (2019)

== Alumni who are current Div. I coaches/administrators ==
- Geoff Arnold (1982–1986 – player) – Assistant, Rider
- Kevin Baggett (1986–1988 – player) – Head Coach, Rider
- Rich Carragher (1996–2000 – student manager) – Associate Athletics Director, Monmouth
- Na'im Crenshaw (1998-2002 – player) - Assistant, West Chester
- Mike Farrelly (2001–2003 – player) – Assistant, Notre Dame
- John Gallagher (1995–1999 – player) – Head Coach, Manhattan
- Dwayne Lee (2002–2006 – player) – Assistant, Quinnipiac
- Phil Martelli Jr. (1999–2003 – player) – Head Coach, Virginia Commonwealth University
- Bill Phillips (1999–2002 – player) – Assistant, Delaware
- Rob Sullivan (2002-2006 – player) - Associate Athletics Director, Saint Joseph's
- Ryan Whalen (2005–2008 – student assistant) – Assistant, Seton Hall
- Ernest Pearsall (2000–2004 – manager) – Assistant, Mississippi Valley State
