= 2008 CAA men's basketball tournament =

- Classification: Division I
- Season: 2007–08
- Teams: 12
- Site: Richmond Coliseum; Richmond, Virginia
- Champions: George Mason (4th title)
- Winning coach: Jim Larranaga (3rd title)
- MVP: Folarin Campbell (George Mason)
- Television: Comcast, ESPN

2007–08 CAA men's basketball standings
	Conf.				Overall
Team	W		L	PCT	W		L	PCT
VCU	15	–	3	.833	24	–	8	.750
UNC Wilmington	12	–	6	.667	20	–	13	.606
George Mason †	12	–	6	.667	23	–	11	.676
Old Dominion	11	–	7	.611	18	–	16	.529
William & Mary	10	–	8	.556	17	–	16	.515
Northeastern	9	–	9	.500	14	–	17	.452
Delaware	9	–	9	.500	14	–	17	.452
Hofstra	8	–	10	.444	12	–	18	.400
Towson	7	–	11	.389	13	–	18	.419
Drexel	5	–	13	.278	12	–	20	.375
James Madison	5	–	13	.278	13	–	17	.433
Georgia State	5	–	13	.278	9	–	21	.300
† 2008 CAA tournament winner Rankings from AP poll

The 2008 CAA men's basketball tournament was an NCAA Division 1 College Basketball Conference tournament that was held at the Richmond Coliseum on March 7–10, 2008, to decide the Colonial Athletic Association conference champion. The winner advanced to the NCAA Men's Division I Basketball Championship tournament, a 64-team tournament to decide a national champion of college basketball.

== Bracket ==
First round Friday, March 7
8	Hofstra	66
9	Towson	81
5	William & Mary	58
12	Georgia State	57
7	Delaware	60
10	Drexel	51
6	Northeastern	73
11	James Madison	55

Quarterfinals; Saturday, March 8
9	Towson	46
1	VCU	57
5	William & Mary	63
4	Old Dominion	60
2	UNC Wilmington	82
7	Delaware	59
3	George Mason	63
6	Northeastern	52

Semifinals; Sunday, March 9
1	VCU	54
5	William & Mary	56
2	UNC Wilmington	41
3	George Mason	53

Final; Monday, March 10
5	William & Mary	59
3	George Mason	68

== Honors ==
CAA All-Tournament Team	Player	School	Position	Year
CAA All-Tournament Team	Folarin Campbell	George Mason	Guard	Senior
CAA All-Tournament Team	Laimis Kisielius	William & Mary	Forward	Senior
CAA All-Tournament Team	Eric Maynor	Virginia Commonwealth	Guard	Junior
CAA All-Tournament Team	David Schneider	William & Mary	Guard	Sophomore
CAA All-Tournament Team	Danny Sumner	William & Mary	Forward	Sophomore
CAA All-Tournament Team	Will Thomas	George Mason	Forward	Senior

== Notable games ==
=== First round ===
- William and Mary d. Georgia State 58–57: David Schneider made a 3-pointer with less than a second remaining to eliminate the Panthers one year after the Tribe lost to GSU the same way.

=== Quarterfinals ===
- George Mason d. Northeastern 63–52: One week prior to this game, Northeastern had beaten GMU in the regular season finale.

=== Semifinals ===
- William and Mary d. VCU 56–54: Laimus Kisielius banked in a layup with 3 seconds left to earn W&M its first-ever trip to the CAA Championship game. The fans stormed the Richmond Coliseum court.

=== Championship ===
- George Mason d. William and Mary 68–59: The win secured GMU coach Jim Larranaga's fourth NCAA Tournament appearance with the Patriots since 1998.
