= 2007–08 Saint Joseph's Hawks men's basketball team =

American college basketball season

2007–08 Saint Joseph's Hawks men's basketball
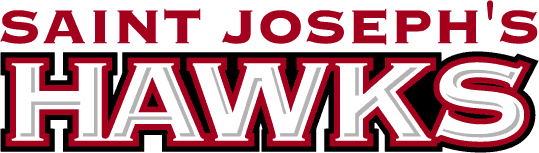

NCAA tournament, First Round
- Conference: Atlantic 10 Conference
- Record: 21–13 (9–7 A-10)
- Head coach: Phil Martelli (13th season)
- Home arena: Alumni Memorial Fieldhouse

2007–08 Atlantic 10 men's basketball standings
| | Conf. | | | | Overall |
| Team | W | | L | PCT | W | | L | PCT |
|---|---|---|---|---|---|---|---|---|
| No. 12 Xavier | 14 | – | 2 | .875 | 30 | – | 7 | .811 |
| Temple † | 11 | – | 5 | .688 | 21 | – | 13 | .618 |
| UMass | 10 | – | 6 | .625 | 25 | – | 11 | .694 |
| Saint Joseph's | 9 | – | 7 | .563 | 21 | – | 13 | .618 |
| Charlotte | 9 | – | 7 | .563 | 20 | – | 14 | .588 |
| Richmond | 9 | – | 7 | .563 | 16 | – | 15 | .516 |
| Dayton | 8 | – | 8 | .500 | 23 | – | 11 | .676 |
| La Salle | 8 | – | 8 | .500 | 15 | – | 17 | .469 |
| Rhode Island | 7 | – | 9 | .438 | 21 | – | 12 | .636 |
| Duquesne | 7 | – | 9 | .438 | 17 | – | 13 | .567 |
| Saint Louis | 7 | – | 9 | .438 | 16 | – | 15 | .516 |
| Fordham | 6 | – | 10 | .375 | 12 | – | 17 | .414 |
| George Washington | 5 | – | 11 | .313 | 9 | – | 17 | .346 |
| St. Bonaventure | 2 | – | 14 | .125 | 8 | – | 22 | .267 |
† 2008 Atlantic 10 Tournament winner Rankings from AP poll

The 2007–08 Saint Joseph's Hawks basketball team represented Saint Joseph's University during the 2007–08 NCAA Division I men's basketball season. The Hawks, led by 13th-year head coach Phil Martelli, played their home games at Alumni Memorial Fieldhouse in Philadelphia, Pennsylvania as members of the Atlantic 10 Conference. After finishing the regular season tied for fourth in the A-10 standings, the Hawks reached the championship game of the A-10 tournament before losing to Temple. Saint Joseph's secured an at-large bid to the NCAA tournament as No. 11 seed in the East region. In the opening round, the Hawks were defeated by Oklahoma to end the season at 21–13 (9–7 A-10).

== Roster ==
2007–08 Saint Joseph's Hawks men's basketball team
Players
Coaches

| Pos. | # | Name | Height | Weight | Year | Previous school | Hometown |
|---|---|---|---|---|---|---|---|
| G | 12 | Pat Calathes | 6 ft 10 in (2.08 m) | 210 lb (95 kg) | Sr | Lake Howell | Casselberry, Florida |
| G | 13 | Darrin Govens | 6 ft 1 in (1.85 m) | 187 lb (85 kg) | So | Chester | Chester, Pennsylvania |
| F | 34 | Ahmad Nivins | 6 ft 9 in (2.06 m) | 242 lb (110 kg) | Jr | St. Anthony | Jersey City, New Jersey |

Head coach

- Phil Martelli (Widener)

Assistant coach(es)

Legend

- (C) Team captain
- (S) Suspended
- (I) Ineligible
- (W) Walk-on
- Injured
- Current redshirt

Roster

== Schedule ==
| Date time, TV | Rank^{#} | Opponent^{#} | Result | Record | Site (attendance) city, state |
Regular season
| Nov 12, 2007* | | vs. Fairleigh Dickinson | W 86–66 | 1–0 | Carrier Dome; Syracuse, New York |
| Nov 13, 2007* | | at Syracuse | L 69–72 | 1–1 | Carrier Dome; Syracuse, New York |
| Nov 17, 2007* | | at Boston University | W 57–48 | 2–1 | Agganis Arena; Boston, Massachusetts |
| Nov 27, 2007*; 7:00 pm | | Ball State | W 74–63 | 3–1 | Alumni Memorial Fieldhouse; Philadelphia, Pennsylvania |
| Nov 29, 2007*; ESPNU | | No. 19 Gonzaga | L 65–70 ^{OT} | 3–2 | Alumni Memorial Fieldhouse (3,200); Philadelphia, Pennsylvania |
| Dec 1, 2007* | | Penn State | W 79–67 | 4–2 | Alumni Memorial Fieldhouse; Philadelphia, Pennsylvania |
| Dec 4, 2007* | | Holy Cross | L 66–71 | 4–3 | Alumni Memorial Fieldhouse; Philadelphia, Pennsylvania |
| Dec 9, 2007* | | at Creighton | L 84–90 ^{OT} | 4–4 | Qwest Center Omaha; Omaha, Nebraska |
| Dec 21, 2007* | | at Fairfield | W 78–70 | 5–4 | Arena at Harbor Yard; Fairfield, Connecticut |
| Dec 28, 2007* | | at Siena | W 74–68 | 6–4 | Times Union Center; Albany, New York |
| Dec 31, 2007* | | at Drexel | W 69–51 | 7–4 | Daskalakis Athletic Center; Philadelphia, Pennsylvania |
| Jan 9, 2008; 7:30 pm | | at UMass | W 98–92 | 8–4 (1–0) | Mullins Center (5,121); Amherst, Massachusetts |
| Jan 12, 2008 | | Richmond | W 81–63 | 9–4 (2–0) | Alumni Memorial Fieldhouse (9,847); Philadelphia, Pennsylvania |
| Jan 16, 2008 | | at Charlotte | L 66–70 | 9–5 (2–1) | Dale F. Halton Arena; Charlotte, North Carolina |
| Jan 19, 2008* | | at Penn | W 82–42 | 10–5 | The Palestra; Philadelphia, Pennsylvania |
| Jan 23, 2008; 6:00 pm | | UMass | W 81–77 | 11–5 (3–1) | Alumni Memorial Fieldhouse (3,200); Philadelphia, Pennsylvania |
| Jan 26, 2008 | | at Temple | W 68–67 | 12–5 (4–1) | Liacouras Center; Philadelphia, Pennsylvania |
| Jan 30, 2008 | | at George Washington | W 61–59 | 13–5 (5–1) | Charles E. Smith Center; Washington, D.C. |
| Feb 2, 2008 | | Fordham | W 70–55 | 14–5 (6–1) | Alumni Memorial Fieldhouse; Philadelphia, Pennsylvania |
| Feb 4, 2008* | | Villanova | W 77–55 | 15–5 | Alumni Memorial Fieldhouse; Philadelphia, Pennsylvania |
| Feb 6, 2008 | | at Duquesne | L 88–102 | 15–6 (6–2) | A.J. Palumbo Center; Pittsburgh, Pennsylvania |
| Feb 10, 2008 | | at No. 13 Xavier | L 72–76 | 15–7 (6–3) | Cintas Center; Cincinnati, Ohio |
| Feb 13, 2008 | | St. Bonaventure | W 81–56 | 16–7 (7–3) | Alumni Memorial Fieldhouse; Philadelphia, Pennsylvania |
| Feb 18, 2008 | | La Salle | L 89–90 | 16–8 (7–4) | Alumni Memorial Fieldhouse; Philadelphia, Pennsylvania |
| Feb 24, 2008 | | at Rhode Island | W 90–83 | 17–8 (8–4) | Thomas M. Ryan Center; Kingston, Rhode Island |
| Feb 28, 2008 | | Saint Louis | L 55–64 | 17–9 (8–5) | Alumni Memorial Fieldhouse; Philadelphia, Pennsylvania |
| Mar 2, 2008 | | Temple | L 56–57 | 17–10 (8–6) | Alumni Memorial Fieldhouse; Philadelphia, Pennsylvania |
| Mar 6, 2008 | | No. 8 Xavier | W 71–66 | 18–10 (9–6) | Alumni Memorial Fieldhouse; Philadelphia, Pennsylvania |
| Mar 8, 2008 | | at Dayton | L 67–79 | 18–11 (9–7) | University of Dayton Arena (13,435); Dayton, Ohio |
A-10 tournament
| Mar 12, 2008* | | vs. Fordham; First Round | W 80–62 | 19–11 | Boardwalk Hall; Atlantic City, New Jersey |
| Mar 13, 2008* | | vs. Richmond; Quarterfinals | W 61–47 | 20–11 | Boardwalk Hall; Atlantic City, New Jersey |
| Mar 14, 2008* | | vs. No. 10 Xavier; Semifinals | W 61–53 | 21–11 | Boardwalk Hall; Atlantic City, New Jersey |
| Mar 15, 2008* | | vs. Temple; Championship Game | L 64–69 | 21–12 | Boardwalk Hall; Atlantic City, New Jersey |
NCAA tournament
| Mar 21, 2008* | (11 E) | vs. (6 E) Oklahoma; First Round | L 64–72 | 21–13 | Birmingham-Jefferson Civic Center; Birmingham, Alabama |
*Non-conference game. ^{#}Rankings from AP Poll. (#) Tournament seedings in parentheses. E=East. All times are in Eastern Time.
