= 2007–08 George Mason Patriots men's basketball team =

American college basketball season

2007–08 George Mason Patriots men's basketball

CAA Conference tournament champions

NCAA 1st Round vs. Notre Dame, L, 50–68
- Conference: Colonial Athletic Association
- Record: 23–11 (12–6 CAA)
- Head coach: Jim Larranaga
- Assistant coaches: Eric Konkol; Chris Caputo; Michael Huger
- Home arena: Patriot Center

2007–08 CAA men's basketball standings
	Conf.				Overall
Team	W		L	PCT	W		L	PCT
VCU	15	–	3	.833	24	–	8	.750
UNC Wilmington	12	–	6	.667	20	–	13	.606
George Mason †	12	–	6	.667	23	–	11	.676
Old Dominion	11	–	7	.611	18	–	16	.529
William & Mary	10	–	8	.556	17	–	16	.515
Northeastern	9	–	9	.500	14	–	17	.452
Delaware	9	–	9	.500	14	–	17	.452
Hofstra	8	–	10	.444	12	–	18	.400
Towson	7	–	11	.389	13	–	18	.419
Drexel	5	–	13	.278	12	–	20	.375
James Madison	5	–	13	.278	13	–	17	.433
Georgia State	5	–	13	.278	9	–	21	.300
† 2008 CAA tournament winner Rankings from AP poll

The 2007–08 George Mason Patriots men's basketball team began their 42nd season of collegiate play on November 9, 2007 at the Patriot Center versus Vermont. George Mason won the 2008 CAA tournament and advanced to the 2008 NCAA tournament. The Patriots were awarded a #12 seed, but lost in the first round to Notre Dame.

== Season notes ==
- On February 20, 2008, Coach Jim Larranaga earned his 400th career victory.
- On January 19, 2008, Junior guard Dre Smith set an NCAA Division I record for most 3 point field goals made without a miss (10).
- On December 21, 2007, it was announced that freshman guard Jay Threatt was released from his basketball commitment and will seek a transfer from the university.
- On December 18, 2007, it was announced that senior forward Darryl Monroe will take a medical redshirt for the 2007–2008 season and will maintain his last year of eligibility for the 2008–2009 season.

== Awards ==
First Team All-CAA

- Will Thomas

Second Team All-CAA

- Folarin Campbell

CAA All-Defensive Team

- Will Thomas

CAA Player of the Week

- Will Thomas – Nov. 19
- Will Thomas – Nov. 26
- Dre Smith – Jan. 21
- Folarin Campbell – Feb. 11

CAA Rookie of the Week

- Cam Long – Jan. 14

== Roster ==
2007–08 George Mason Patriots men's basketball team
Players
Coaches

Pos.	#	Name	Height	Weight	Year	Previous school	Hometown
F	33	Louis Birdsong	6 ft 6 in (1.98 m)	230 lb (104 kg)	So	Mount Saint Joseph’s	Baltimore, MD
G	42	Folarin Campbell	6 ft 4 in (1.93 m)	205 lb (93 kg)	Sr	Springbrook	Silver Spring, MD
G	2	Jordan Carter	6 ft 0 in (1.83 m)	175 lb (79 kg)	Sr	Brebeuf	Indianapolis, IN
F	40	Chris Fleming	6 ft 7 in (2.01 m)	240 lb (109 kg)	Jr	Osbourn Park	Manassas, VA
G	20	Cam Long	6 ft 4 in (1.93 m)	177 lb (80 kg)	Fr	Freedom	Palm Bay, FL
F	41	Vlad Moldoveanu	6 ft 10 in (2.08 m)	206 lb (93 kg)	Fr	St. John's College	Romania
F	32	Darryl Monroe (injured)	6 ft 7 in (2.01 m)	275 lb (125 kg)	Sr	First Colonial	Virginia Beach, VA
G	1	Dre Smith	6 ft 0 in (1.83 m)	185 lb (84 kg)	Jr	Lamar	Houston, TX
G	25	Isaiah Tate	6 ft 4 in (1.93 m)	214 lb (97 kg)	Fr	DeMatha	Upper Marlboro, MD
F	34	Will Thomas	6 ft 7 in (2.01 m)	230 lb (104 kg)	Sr	Mount Saint Joseph’s	Baltimore, MD
G	23	John Vaughn	6 ft 3 in (1.91 m)	179 lb (81 kg)	RS Jr	Laurel	Laurel, MD

Head coach

- Jim Larranaga (Providence)

Assistant coach(es)

- Eric Konkol (Wisconsin-Eau Claire)
- Michael Huger (Bowling Green)
- Chris Caputo (Westfield)

Legend

- (C) Team captain
- (S) Suspended
- (I) Ineligible
- (W) Walk-on
- Injured
- Current redshirt

Roster
Last update: 2010-07-27

== Stats ==
Player	GP	GS	MPG	FG%	3FG%	FT%	RPG	APG	SPG	BPG	PPG
Will Thomas	34	34	35.6	.642	1.000	.672	10.4	2.0	.9	.1	16.1
Folarin Campbell	34	34	32.9	.419	.364	.733	4.5	3.3	1.1	.5	15.6
John Vaughan	34	33	33.2	.426	.336	.741	4.0	2.1	.8	.3	12.3
Dre Smith	34	22	25.3	.391	.377	.639	2.0	1.3	.7	.1	8.4
Louis Birdsong	34	28	23.6	.539	.000	.677	3.9	.9	.6	1.0	6.1
Cam Long	34	4	17.9	.450	.375	.650	2.4	1.6	.1	.7	4.1
Jordan Carter	27	11	16.8	.356	.344	.720	1.9	1.7	.6	.1	3.0
Vlad Moldoveanu	31	4	11.4	.379	.154	.800	2.1	.3	.2	.5	2.3
Chris Fleming	34	0	6.8	.489	.000	.500	.9	.1	.1	.0	1.4
Isaiah Tate	22	0	4.6	.320	.222	1.000	.5	.2	.1	.0	1.3
Jay Threatt	4	0	3.3	.000	.000	.000	.5	.5	.0	.0	0.0

== Game log ==
Date time, TV	Rank^{#}	Opponent^{#}	Result	Record	High points	High rebounds	High assists	Site (attendance) city, state
Non-conference regular season
November 9, 2007*; 7:00 pm, MASN		Vermont	W 60–53	1–0	16 – Thomas	17 – Thomas	5 – Carter	Patriot Center (-); Fairfax, VA
November 13, 2007*; 7:00 pm, Cox Sports		Cleveland State	W 56–47	2–0	18 – Thomas, Vaughan	8 – Thomas	4 – Carter	Patriot Center (-); Fairfax, VA
November 17, 2007*; 7:00 pm, Cox Sports		Dayton	W 67–56	3–0	20 – Campbell	17 – Thomas	5 – Vaughan	Patriot Center (7,274); Fairfax, VA
November 22, 2007*; 9:00 pm, ESPN2		vs. No. 18 Kansas State; Old Spice Classic	W 87–77	4–0	21 – Vaughan	9 – Carter	8 – Carter	The Milk House (-); Orlando, FL
November 23, 2007*; 5:00 pm, ESPN2		vs. No. 20 Villanova; Old Spice Classic	L 76–84	4–1	25 – Campbell	8 – Thomas	3 – Thomas, Vaughan	The Milk House (-); Orlando, FL
November 25, 2007*; 4:30 pm, ESPN2		vs. South Carolina; Old Spice Classic	W 69–68	5–1	22 – Thomas	11 – Thomas	5 – Long	The Milk House (-); Orlando, FL
November 29, 2007; 7:00 pm, Comcast		Drexel	W 85–38	6–1 (1–0)	16 – Smith	8 – Thomas	4 – Carter	Patriot Center (-); Fairfax, VA
December 2, 2007*; 5:00 pm, MASN		vs. East Carolina; BB&T Classic	L 65–68	6–2	16 – Smith	11 – Thomas	2 – Carter, Vaughan	Verizon Center (-); Washington, DC
December 5, 2007*; 7:00 pm, Cox Sports		Hampton	W 57–54	7–2	16 – Campbell	11 – Thomas	5 – Campbell	Patriot Center (-); Fairfax, VA
December 8, 2007*; 2:00 pm		at Kent State	L 55–73	7–3	17 – Vaughan	7 – Birdsong	2 – Long, Vaughan	MAC Center (-); Kent, OH
December 21, 2007*; 7:00 pm		at FIU	W 86–68	8–3	21 – Smith	9 – Birdsong	5 – Vaughan	FIU Arena (-); Miami, FL
December 30, 2007*; 5:30 pm, MASN		Liberty	W 72–64	9–3	17 – Thomas	11 – Thomas	8 – Campbell	Patriot Center (-); Fairfax, VA
CAA regular season
January 2, 2008; 3:00 pm		at Georgia State	L 64–66	9–4 (1–1)	18 – Vaughan	8 – Thomas	4 – Campbell	GSU Sports Arena (-); Atlanta, GA
January 5, 2008; 4:30 pm, CN8		Towson	W 72–63	10–4 (2–1)	20 – Thomas	14 – Thomas	3 – Campbell, Thomas	Patriot Center (-); Fairfax, VA
January 9, 2008; 7:00 pm, MASN		at Delaware	L 68–73 ^{OT}	10–5 (2–2)	20 – Thomas	13 – Thomas	3 – Campbell	Bob Carpenter Center (-); Newark, DE
January 12, 2008; 2:00 pm, Comcast		Northeastern	W 80–52	11–5 (3–2)	16 – Vaughan	10 – Thomas	4 – Thomas	Patriot Center (-); Fairfax, VA
January 17, 2008; 7:00 pm, ESPNU		at Hofstra	W 85–78 ^{2OT}	12–5 (4–2)	29 – Thomas	9 – Thomas	4 – Campbell	Hofstra Arena (-); Hempstead, NY
January 19, 2008; 8:00 pm, MASN		at James Madison	W 96–75	13–5 (5–2)	34 – Smith	8 – Birdsong	5 – Campbell, Thomas	JMU Convocation Center (-); Harrisonburg, VA
January 23, 2008; 8:00 pm, WSKY4/CN8		Old Dominion	W 86–53	14–5 (6–2)	25 – Campbell	12 – Thomas	6 – Campbell	Patriot Center (-); Fairfax, VA
January 26, 2008; 7:00 pm, MASN		at UNC-Wilmington	L 58–61	14–6 (6–3)	19 – Vaughan	14 – Thomas	4 – Campbell	Trask Coliseum (-); Wilmington, NC
January 29, 2008; 7:00 pm, ESPN2		Virginia Commonwealth	W 63–51	15–6 (7–3)	21 – Thomas	15 – Thomas	4 – Vaughan	Patriot Center (-); Fairfax, VA
February 2, 2008; 2:00 pm, Comcast		James Madison	W 72–46	16–6 (8–3)	20 – Campbell	5 – Birdsong, Campbell, Thomas	5 – Campbell	Patriot Center (-); Fairfax, VA
February 7, 2008; 7:00 pm, ESPNU		at Drexel	W 75–65	17–6 (9–3)	25 – Campbell	12 – Thomas	5 – Thomas	Daskalakis Athletic Center (-); Philadelphia, PA
February 9, 2008; 4:00 pm, Comcast		at Old Dominion	L 64–72	17–7 (9–4)	28 – Campbell	16 – Thomas	3 – Campbell, Long, Smith	Ted Constant Convocation Center (-); Norfolk, VA
February 13, 2008; 9:00 pm, MASN		at Towson	W 85–73	18–7 (10–4)	19 – Vaughan	10 – Thomas	6 – Campbell	Towson Center (-); Towson, MD
February 16, 2008; 6:00 pm, ESPNU		UNC-Wilmington; Homecoming	L 73–75	18–8 (10–5)	24 – Campbell	14 – Thomas	6 – Thomas	Patriot Center (-); Fairfax, VA
February 20, 2008; 1:00 pm, Fios1		Delaware	W 70–58	19–8 (11–5)	24 – Thomas	14 – Thomas	4 – Long	Patriot Center (-); Fairfax, VA
February 23, 2008*; 1:00 pm, ESPN2		at Ohio; ESPN Bracket Busters	L 57–69	19–9	18 – Campbell	9 – Thomas	5 – Campbell	OU Convocation Center (-); Athens, OH
February 27, 2008; 9:00 pm, MASN		William & Mary	W 60–54	20–9 (12–5)	17 – Campbell	8 – Thomas	2 – Campbell, Long, Moldoveanu	Patriot Center (-); Fairfax, VA
March 1, 2008; 2:00 pm, Comcast		at Northeastern	L 59–70	20–10 (12–6)	23 – Campbell	8 – Thomas	6 – Vaughan	Matthews Arena (-); Boston
CAA tournament
March 8, 2008; 8:30 pm, CN8	(3)	vs. (6) Northeastern; Quarterfinals	W 63–52	21–10	20 – Campbell	8 – Thomas	3 – Campbell, Vaughan	Richmond Coliseum (-); Richmond, VA
March 9, 2008; 5:30 pm, CN8	(3)	vs. (2) UNC-Wilmington; Semifinals	W 53–41	22–10	15 – Campbell	14 – Thomas	3 – Long	Richmond Coliseum (-); Richmond, VA
March 10, 2008; 7:00 pm, ESPN	(3)	vs. (5) William & Mary; Championship	W 68–59	23–10	20 – Campbell	13 – Thomas	4 – Campbell	Richmond Coliseum (-); Richmond, VA
NCAA tournament
March 20, 2008*; 9:40 pm, CBS Regional	(12 E)	vs. (5 E) No. 15 Notre Dame; First Round	L 50–68	23–11	25 – Thomas	7 – Thomas	3 – Thomas	Pepsi Center (-); Denver, CO
*Non-conference game. ^{#}Rankings from AP Poll. (#) Tournament seedings in parentheses. All times are in Eastern Time.

== Recruiting ==
The following is a list of players signed for the 2008–09 season:

College recruiting information
Name	Hometown	School	Height	Weight	Commit date
Andre Cornelius; PG	Charlotte, North Carolina	Victory Christian	5 ft 10 in (1.78 m)	175 lb (79 kg)	
Andre Cornelius; PG	Recruit ratings: Scout: Rivals: (87)				
Kevin Foster; PF	Lakeland, Florida	Briarcrest Christian	6 ft 7 in (2.01 m)	205 lb (93 kg)	
Kevin Foster; PF	Recruit ratings: Scout: Rivals: (40)				
Michael Morrison; PF	St. Petersburg, Florida	Lakewood	6 ft 8 in (2.03 m)	200 lb (91 kg)	
Michael Morrison; PF	Recruit ratings: Scout: Rivals: (40)				
Ryan Pearson; SF	Far Rockaway, New York	Christ the King	6 ft 6 in (1.98 m)	200 lb (91 kg)	
Ryan Pearson; SF	Recruit ratings: Scout: Rivals: (76)				
Overall recruit ranking:
Note: In many cases, Scout, Rivals, 247Sports, On3, and ESPN may conflict in their listings of height and weight.; In these cases, the average was taken. ESPN grades are on a 100-point scale.; Sources: "ESPN". ESPN.; "2008 Team Ranking". Rivals.
