= 2007–08 Dayton Flyers men's basketball team =

American college basketball season

2007–08 Dayton Flyers men's basketball
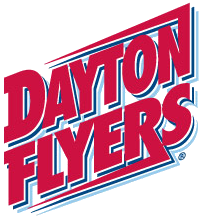

NIT, Quarterfinals
- Conference: Atlantic 10 Conference
- Record: 23–11 (8–8 A-10)
- Head coach: Brian Gregory (5th season)
- Assistant coaches: Billy Schmidt; Anthony Solomon; Jon Borovich
- Home arena: University of Dayton Arena

2007–08 Atlantic 10 men's basketball standings
	Conf.				Overall
Team	W		L	PCT	W		L	PCT
No. 12 Xavier	14	–	2	.875	30	–	7	.811
Temple †	11	–	5	.688	21	–	13	.618
UMass	10	–	6	.625	25	–	11	.694
Saint Joseph's	9	–	7	.563	21	–	13	.618
Charlotte	9	–	7	.563	20	–	14	.588
Richmond	9	–	7	.563	16	–	15	.516
Dayton	8	–	8	.500	23	–	11	.676
La Salle	8	–	8	.500	15	–	17	.469
Rhode Island	7	–	9	.438	21	–	12	.636
Duquesne	7	–	9	.438	17	–	13	.567
Saint Louis	7	–	9	.438	16	–	15	.516
Fordham	6	–	10	.375	12	–	17	.414
George Washington	5	–	11	.313	9	–	17	.346
St. Bonaventure	2	–	14	.125	8	–	22	.267
† 2008 Atlantic 10 Tournament winner Rankings from AP poll

The 2007–08 Dayton Flyers men's basketball team represented the University of Dayton during the 2007–08 NCAA Division I men's basketball season. The Flyers, led by fifth year head coach Brian Gregory, played their home games at the University of Dayton Arena and were members of the Atlantic 10 Conference. They finished the season 23–11, 8–8 in A-10 play. They received an at-large bid to the NIT where they defeated Cleveland State in the first round and Illinois State in the second round before falling to eventual champion Ohio State in the quarterfinals. The Flyers started the season 14–1 and were ranked as high as 14th in the AP poll, the program's highest ranking since the 1967–68 season. Dayton finished the regular season 6–8 after injuries to starter Charles Little and highly rated freshman Chris Wright.

== Previous season ==
The 2006–07 Dayton Flyers finished the season with an overall record of 19–12, with a record of 8–8 in the Atlantic 10 regular season. The Flyers started the season 10–1, with wins over Louisville, Holy Cross, and Creighton. The Flyers faltered in conference play, and fell to Xavier in the quarterfinals of the 2007 Atlantic 10 men's basketball tournament. They were not selected to play in a postseason tournament.

== Offseason ==
=== Departures ===
Name	Number	Pos.	Height	Weight	Year	Hometown	Notes
Monty Scott	1	F	6'6"	230	Senior	Reynoldsburg, OH	Graduated
Nick Stafford	5	F	6'8"	225	Junior	Springfield, MA	Transferred
Desmond Adedeji	20	C	6'9"	298	Senior	Landover, MD	Transferred to Stony Brook
Norman Plummer	21	F	6'7"	238	Junior	Cincinnati, OH	Transferred to Southern Indiana

=== Incoming transfers ===
Name	Number	Pos.	Height	Weight	Year	Hometown	Previous School
Mickey Perry	0	G	6'2"	193	Sophomore	Maywood, IL	Transfer from Wisconsin.
Thiago Cordero	54	F	6'9"	220	Junior	Pernambuco, Brazil	Junior college transfer from Barton Community College.

== Incoming recruits ==
College recruiting information
Name	Hometown	School	Height	Weight	Commit date
Chris Wright; PF	Trotwood, OH	Trotwood-Madison High School	6 ft 6 in (1.98 m)	205 lb (93 kg)	Nov 7, 2005
Chris Wright; PF	Recruit ratings: Scout: Rivals: (95)				
Stephen Thomas; PG	Indianapolis, IN	Cathedral High School	6 ft 2 in (1.88 m)	180 lb (82 kg)	Sep 22, 2006
Stephen Thomas; PG	Recruit ratings: Scout: Rivals: (92)				
Devin Searcy; PF	Detroit, MI	Romulus High School	6 ft 9 in (2.06 m)	205 lb (93 kg)	Nov 1, 2006
Devin Searcy; PF	Recruit ratings: Scout: Rivals: (80)				
Overall recruit ranking:
Note: In many cases, Scout, Rivals, 247Sports, On3, and ESPN may conflict in their listings of height and weight.; In these cases, the average was taken. ESPN grades are on a 100-point scale.; Sources: "2007 Team Ranking". Rivals.

== Roster ==
2007–08 Dayton Flyers men's basketball team
Players
Coaches

Pos.	#	Name	Height	Weight	Year	Previous school	Hometown
G	2	Brian Roberts	6 ft 2 in (1.88 m)	175 lb (79 kg)	Sr	St. John's	Toledo, OH
G	3	Andres Sandoval	6 ft 4 in (1.93 m)	198 lb (90 kg)	RS Sr	Winchendon/Santa Fe CC	Milford, MA
G	11	Stephen Thomas	6 ft 1 in (1.85 m)	184 lb (83 kg)	Fr	Cathedral	Indianapolis, IN
G	14	London Warren	6 ft 0 in (1.83 m)	180 lb (82 kg)	So	Raines	Jacksonville, FL
F	15	Charles Little	6 ft 6 in (1.98 m)	237 lb (108 kg)	Jr	Cleveland	Cleveland, TN
F	23	Chris Wright	6 ft 8 in (2.03 m)	214 lb (97 kg)	Fr	Trotwood-Madison	Trotwood, OH
G	24	Luke Hendrick (W)	6 ft 4 in (1.93 m)	170 lb (77 kg)	So	Nouvel Catholic Central	Saginaw, MI
G	25	Logan Nourse (W)	6 ft 1 in (1.85 m)	176 lb (80 kg)	Fr	Spencerville	Spencerville, OH
G	30	Dan Fox (W)	6 ft 4 in (1.93 m)	190 lb (86 kg)	So	Lakeland	Wolcottville, IN
G	32	Marcus Johnson	6 ft 3 in (1.91 m)	193 lb (88 kg)	So	St. Vincent-St. Mary	Cleveland, OH
F	33	Jimmy Binnie	6 ft 7 in (2.01 m)	211 lb (96 kg)	Sr	Johnston	Des Moines, IA
F/C	34	Devin Searcy	6 ft 10 in (2.08 m)	240 lb (109 kg)	Fr	Romulus Senior	Romulus, MI
F/C	41	Kurt Huelsman	6 ft 10 in (2.08 m)	240 lb (109 kg)	So	St. Henry	St. Henry, OH
G	45	Michael Laing (W)	6 ft 1 in (1.85 m)	164 lb (74 kg)	Fr	Marquette	Oconomowoc, WI
F/C	54	Thiago Cordero	6 ft 9 in (2.06 m)	220 lb (100 kg)	Jr	Atual/Barton CC	Pernambuco, Brazil
G		Mickey Perry (redshirt)	6 ft 2 in (1.88 m)	193 lb (88 kg)	RS So	Proviso East	Maywood, IL

Head coach

- Brian Gregory (Oakland)

Assistant coach(es)

- Billy Schmidt (Wake Forest)
- Anthony Solomon (Virginia)
- Jon Borovich (Central Michigan)

Legend

- (C) Team captain
- (S) Suspended
- (I) Ineligible
- (W) Walk-on
- Injured
- Current redshirt

Roster

== Schedule ==
Date time, TV	Rank^{#}	Opponent^{#}	Result	Record	Site (attendance) city, state
Exhibition
11/01/2007*; 7:00 pm		Findlay	W 81–78	–	UD Arena; Dayton, OH
11/05/2007*; 7:00 pm		California (PA)	W 62–49	–	UD Arena; Dayton, OH
Non-conference regular season
11/10/2008*; 2:00 pm		East Tennessee State	W 78–74	1–0	UD Arena (12,115); Dayton, OH
11/17/2007*; 7:00 pm		at George Mason	L 56–67	1–1	Patriot Center (7,274); Fairfax, VA
11/21/2007*; 2:00 pm		Toledo	W 76–70	2–1	UD Arena (12,211); Dayton, OH
11/24/2007*; 2:00 pm		SMU	W 82–57	3–1	UD Arena (12,242); Dayton, OH
11/28/2007*; 7:30 pm		at Miami (OH)	W 63–62	4–1	Millett Hall (5,234); Oxford, OH
12/01/2007*; 7:00 pm		at Holy Cross	W 55–53	5–1	DCU Center (3,721); Worcester, MA
12/05/2007*; 8:00 pm		High Point	W 68–54	6–1	UD Arena (11,984); Dayton, OH
12/08/2007*; 2:00 pm		at No. 14 Louisville	W 70–65	7–1	Freedom Hall (19,128); Louisville, KY
12/15/2007*; 7:00 pm		Coppin State	W 66–34	8–1	UD Arena (12,063); Dayton, OH
12/19/2007*; 7:00 pm		American	W 63–56	9–1	UD Arena (12,508); Dayton, OH
12/22/2008*; 7:00 pm		Loyola Maryland	W 91–74	10–1	UD Arena (12,859); Dayton, OH
12/29/2008*; 8:00 pm		No. 6 Pittsburgh	W 80–55	11–1	UD Arena (13,435); Dayton, OH
1/02/2008*; 7:00 pm	No. 20	Akron	W 83–81 ^{2ot}	12–1	UD Arena (12,434); Dayton, OH
Atlantic 10 regular season
01/09/2008; 1:00 pm	No. 17	No. 22 Rhode Island	W 92–83	13–1 (1–0)	UD Arena (13,435); Dayton, OH
01/12/2008; 8:00 pm	No. 17	at Saint Louis	W 68–57 ^{ot}	14–1 (2–0)	Scottrade Center (11,108); St. Louis, MO
01/16/2008; 7:00 pm	No. 14	Massachusetts	L 71–82	14–2 (2–1)	UD Arena (13,435); Dayton, OH
01/24/2008; 8:00 pm	No. 16	at No. 23 Xavier; Blackburn/McCafferty Trophy	L 43–69	14–3 (2–2)	Cintas Center (10,250); Cincinnati, OH
01/26/2008; 7:00 pm	No. 16	at Richmond	L 63-80	14–4 (2–3)	Robins Center (7,125); Richmond, VA
01/30/2008; 7:00 pm		Saint Louis	W 63–36	15–4 (3–3)	UD Arena (13,435); Dayton, OH
02/02/2008; 2:00 pm		at Rhode Island	L 70–82	15–5 (3–4)	Ryan Center (7,657); Kingston, RI
02/06/2008; 7:00 pm		Charlotte	W 69–64	16–5 (4–4)	UD Arena (2,110); Dayton, OH
02/09/2008; 7:00 pm		at George Washington	L 54–57	16–6 (4–5)	Smith Center (3,154); Charlotte, NC
02/13/2008; 7:00 pm		Duquesne	L 61–63	16–7 (4–6)	UD Arena (13,040); Dayton, OH
02/16/2008; 4:00 pm		Temple	W 77–66	17–7 (5–6)	UD Arena (13,435); Dayton, OH
02/21/2008; 7:00 pm		at La Salle	L 78–81 ^{ot}	17–8 (5–7)	Tom Gola Arena (2,347); Philadelphia, PA
02/24/2008; 2:00 pm		No. 10 Xavier; Blackburn/McCafferty Trophy	L 51–57	17–9 (5–8)	UD Arena (13,435); Dayton, OH
03/01/2008; 7:00 pm		at Fordham	W 57–50	18–9 (6–8)	Rose Hill Gym (3,200); Bronx, NY
03/05/2008; 7:00 pm		at St. Bonaventure	W 78–73	19–9 (7–8)	Reilly Center (4,821); St. Bonaventure, NY
03/08/2008; 2:00 pm		Saint Joseph's	W 79–67	20–9 (8–8)	UD Arena (13,435); Dayton, OH
Atlantic 10 tournament
03/12/2008; 12:00 pm		vs. Saint Louis; First round	W 63–62	21–9	Boardwalk Hall (3,342); Atlantic City, NJ
03/13/2009; 12:00 pm		vs. No. 12 Xavier; Quarterfinals	L 65–74	21–10	Boardwalk Hall (4,401); Atlantic City, NJ
NIT
03/19/2008*; 6:00 pm	No. (3)	(6) Cleveland State; First round	W 66–57	22–10	UD Arena (7,012); Dayton, OH
03/24/2008*; 7:05 pm	No. (3)	at (2) Illinois State; Second round	W 55–48	23–10	Redbird Arena (8,802); Normal, IL
03/26/2008*; 9:00 pm	No. (3)	at (1) Ohio State; Quarterfinals	L 63–74	23–11	Value City Arena (19,409); Columbus, OH
*Non-conference game. ^{#}Rankings from AP Poll. (#) Tournament seedings in parentheses. All times are in Eastern Time.
