= 2007–08 Old Dominion Monarchs basketball team =

American college basketball season

2007–08 Old Dominion Monarchs basketball

CBI tournament, Quarterfinals
- Conference: Colonial Athletic Association
- Record: 18–16 (11–7 CAA)
- Head coach: Blaine Taylor (7th season)
- Assistant coaches: Jim Corrigan (14th season); Rob Wilkes (6th season); Travis DeCuire (5th season)
- Home arena: Ted Constant Convocation Center

2007–08 CAA men's basketball standings
	Conf.				Overall
Team	W		L	PCT	W		L	PCT
VCU	15	–	3	.833	24	–	8	.750
UNC Wilmington	12	–	6	.667	20	–	13	.606
George Mason †	12	–	6	.667	23	–	11	.676
Old Dominion	11	–	7	.611	18	–	16	.529
William & Mary	10	–	8	.556	17	–	16	.515
Northeastern	9	–	9	.500	14	–	17	.452
Delaware	9	–	9	.500	14	–	17	.452
Hofstra	8	–	10	.444	12	–	18	.400
Towson	7	–	11	.389	13	–	18	.419
Drexel	5	–	13	.278	12	–	20	.375
James Madison	5	–	13	.278	13	–	17	.433
Georgia State	5	–	13	.278	9	–	21	.300
† 2008 CAA tournament winner Rankings from AP poll

The 2007–08 Old Dominion Monarchs basketball team represented Old Dominion University in National Collegiate Athletic Association (NCAA) Division I men's basketball during the 2007–08 season. Playing in the Colonial Athletic Association (CAA) and led by seventh-year head coach Blaine Taylor, the Monarchs finished the season with a 18–16 overall record (11–7 CAA). After finishing fourth in the CAA regular season standings, Old Dominion lost to the William & Mary Tribe in the CAA Tournament quarterfinal.

Despite an unsuccessful conference postseason, ODU secured a bid to the 2008 College Basketball Invitational. Playing as the No. 2 seed in the East region, the Monarchs beat No. 3 seed Rider in the opening round and lost to Virginia in the quarterfinals.

== Roster ==
2007–08 Old Dominion Monarchs men's basketball team
Players
Coaches

Pos.	#	Name	Height	Weight	Year	Previous school	Hometown
G	0	Abdi Lidonde	6 ft 2 in (1.88 m)	200 lb (91 kg)	Jr	St. Andrews HS	Sutton, Massachusetts
G/F	2	Ben Finney	6 ft 5 in (1.96 m)	215 lb (98 kg)	So	I.C. Norcom HS	Portsmouth, Virginia
G	3	Darius James (redshirt)	6 ft 0 in (1.83 m)	170 lb (77 kg)		Tallwood HS	Virginia Beach, Virginia
G	4	Brandon Johnson	6 ft 1 in (1.85 m)	182 lb (83 kg)	Sr	Edgewater HS	Orlando, Florida
G	10	Etoile Imama	6 ft 3 in (1.91 m)	195 lb (88 kg)	Fr	Champlain St. Lambert	Montreal, Canada
F	12	Gerald Lee	6 ft 10 in (2.08 m)	250 lb (113 kg)	So	Korihait	Uusikaupunki, Finland
G	20	Brian Henderson	6 ft 4 in (1.93 m)	200 lb (91 kg)	RS Sr	Varina HS	Richmond, Virginia
F	21	Frank Hassell	6 ft 9 in (2.06 m)	255 lb (116 kg)	RS So	Indian River HS	Chesapeake, Virginia
G	23	Marsharee Neely (redshirt)	6 ft 2 in (1.88 m)	190 lb (86 kg)		Walter Hines Page HS	Greensboro, North Carolina
G/F	24	Kent Bazemore (redshirt)	6 ft 5 in (1.96 m)	195 lb (88 kg)		Bertie HS	Kelford, North Carolina
C	30	Sam Harris	7 ft 3 in (2.21 m)	270 lb (122 kg)	Sr	Lake Ginninderra	Launceston, Australia
F	33	Keyon Carter	6 ft 8 in (2.03 m)	218 lb (99 kg)	RS So	Dwyer HS	Riviera Beach, Florida
F	34	Jonathan Adams	6 ft 6 in (1.98 m)	215 lb (98 kg)	Jr	Baylor School (TN)	Ringgold, Georgia

Head coach

- Blaine Taylor (Montana '81)

Assistant coach(es)

- Jim Corrigan (Duke '80)
- Rob Wilkes (Stetson '93)
- Travis DeCuire (Montana '94)

Legend

- (C) Team captain
- (S) Suspended
- (I) Ineligible
- (W) Walk-on
- Injured
- Current redshirt

Roster
Last update: January 4, 2024

== Schedule and results ==
Date time, TV	Rank^{#}	Opponent^{#}	Result	Record	Site city, state
Exhibition
October 31, 2007*; 6:00 p.m.		Mount Olive	W 83–53		Ted Constant Center; Norfolk, VA
November 5, 2007*; 7:00 p.m.		Shepherd	W 78–65		Ted Constant Center; Norfolk, VA
Non-conference regular season
November 11, 2007*; 2:00 p.m.		South Carolina State	W 64–54	1–0	Ted Constant Center; Norfolk, VA
November 16, 2007*; 7:00 p.m., WSKY4		Toledo	W 66–35	2–0	Ted Constant Center; Norfolk, VA
November 18, 2007*; 2:00 p.m., ACC Select		at Clemson	L 53–66	2–1	Littlejohn Coliseum (6,528); Clemson, SC
November 20, 2007*; 7:00 p.m.		Iona; Las Vegas Invitational	W 74–63	3–1	Ted Constant Center; Norfolk, VA
November 23, 2007*; 11:55 p.m., ESPNU		vs. No. 1 North Carolina; Las Vegas Invitational	L 82–99	3–2	Orleans Arena (5,500); Las Vegas, NV
November 24, 2007*; 7:30 p.m.		vs. No. 12 Louisville; Las Vegas Invitational	L 53–64	3–3	Orleans Arena; Las Vegas, NV
November 28, 2007*; 7:00 p.m., MASN		No. 5 Georgetown	L 48–66	3–4	Ted Constant Center (8,424); Norfolk, VA
December 1, 2007; 7:30 p.m.		at Georgia State	W 72–64	4–4 (1–0)	GSU Sports Arena; Atlanta, GA
December 8, 2007*; 7:00 p.m.		UMES	W 74–49	5–4	Ted Constant Center; Norfolk, VA
December 16, 2007*; 4:00 p.m., Comcast		Virginia Tech	W 72–69	6–4	Ted Constant Center; Norfolk, VA
December 19, 2007*; 7:00 p.m.		at Richmond	L 49–55	6–5	Robins Center (3,350); Richmond, VA
December 21, 2007*; 7:00 p.m.		at Winthrop	L 69–72	6–6	Winthrop Coliseum (3,054); Rock Hill, SC
December 29, 2007*; 8:00 p.m.		at UAB	L 57–70	6–7	Bartow Arena; Birmingham, AL
CAA regular season
January 2, 2008; 7:00 p.m.		Hofstra	W 75–54	7–7 (2–0)	Ted Constant Center; Norfolk, VA
January 5, 2008; 8:00 p.m., Comcast		William & Mary; Rivalry	L 61–70	7–8 (2–1)	Ted Constant Center; Norfolk, VA
January 9, 2008; 7:00 p.m.		at Towson	W 71–59	8–8 (3–1)	Towson Center; Towson, MD
January 12, 2008; 7:00 p.m., WSKY4		at Delaware	L 74–81	8–9 (3–2)	Bob Carpenter Center; Newark, DE
January 16, 2008; 7:00 p.m., Comcast		James Madison; Rivalry	W 79–52	9–9 (4–2)	Ted Constant Center; Norfolk, VA
January 19, 2008; 4:00 p.m., Comcast		VCU; Rivalry	L 68–78	9–10 (4–3)	Ted Constant Center; Norfolk, VA
January 23, 2008; 8:00 p.m., WSKY4/CN8		at George Mason	L 53–86	9–11 (4–4)	Patriot Center; Fairfax, VA
January 26, 2008; 7:00 p.m.		at William & Mary	W 72–59	10–11 (5–4)	Kaplan Arena; Williamsburg, VA
January 30, 2008; 7:00 p.m.		UNC Wilmington	L 65–68	10–12 (5–5)	Ted Constant Center; Norfolk, VA
February 2, 2008; 4:00 p.m.		Georgia State	W 73–50	11–12 (6–5)	Ted Constant Center; Norfolk, VA
February 6, 2008; 7:00 p.m.		at Northeastern	L 60–67	11–13 (6–6)	Matthews Arena; Boston, MA
February 9, 2008; 4:00 p.m., Comcast		George Mason	W 72–64	12–13 (7–6)	Ted Constant Center; Norfolk, VA
February 14, 2007; 7:00 p.m., ESPNU		Drexel	W 75–71 ^{2OT}	13–13 (8–6)	Ted Constant Center (5,822); Norfolk, VA
February 16, 2008; 8:00 p.m., ESPN2		at VCU; Rivalry	W 67–66	14–13 (9–6)	Siegel Center; Richmond, VA
February 20, 2008; 7:00 p.m., WSKY4		at James Madison	W 72–52	15–13 (10–6)	JMU Convocation Center; Harrisonburg, VA
February 23, 2008*; 7:00 p.m.		Bucknell; ESPN BracketBusters	W 65–55	16–13	Ted Constant Center; Norfolk, VA
February 27, 2008; 7:00 p.m.		Northeastern	W 70–58	17–13 (11–6)	Ted Constant Center; Norfolk, VA
March 1, 2008; 4:00 p.m., Comcast		at UNC Wilmington	L 64–72	17–14 (11–7)	Trask Coliseum; Wilmington, NC
CAA tournament
March 8, 2008*; 2:30 p.m., WSKY4	(4)	vs. (5) William & Mary; Quarterfinals	L 60–63	17–15	Richmond Coliseum; Richmond, VA
CBI tournament
March 18, 2008*; 7:00 p.m.	(E2)	(E3) Rider; First Round	W 68–65	18–15	Ted Constant Center; Norfolk, VA
March 24, 2008*; 7:00 p.m.	(E2)	at (E1) Virginia; Quarterfinals	L 76–80	18–16	John Paul Jones Arena (6,460); Charlottesville, VA
*Non-conference game. ^{#}Rankings from AP Poll. (#) Tournament seedings in parentheses. All times are in Eastern Time.
