= Paul Senesky =

American basketball player (1925-1994)

Personal information
- Born: January 25, 1925 Mahanoy City, Pennsylvania, U.S.
- Died: July 11, 1994 (aged 69) Pompano Beach, Florida, U.S.
- Listed height: 6 ft 2 in (1.88 m)
- Listed weight: 165 lb (75 kg)

Career information
- College: Saint Joseph's (1947–1950)
- NBA draft: 1950: 4th round, 39th overall pick
- Drafted by: Philadelphia Warriors
- Playing career: 1950–1952
- Position: Forward

Career history
- 1950–1952: Sunbury Mercuries

Career highlights
- EPBL champion (1951); All-EPBL First Team (1951)
- Stats at Basketball Reference

Paul J. Senesky (January 25, 1925 – July 11, 1994) was an American professional basketball player. He played college basketball for the Saint Joseph's Hawks. Senesky was drafted by the Philadelphia Warriors of the National Basketball Association (NBA) in 1950 but turned down the offer to pursue a career in law.

== Early life ==
Senesky was born and educated in Mahanoy City, Pennsylvania, and was the brother of fellow basketball player George. He enlisted in the United States Army after his high school graduation and served in World War II from 1943 to 1946. Senesky worked in radio intelligence with the 66th Infantry Division and helped to break German codes. He survived the sinking of the SS Léopoldville in 1944.

== Playing career ==
Senesky attended Saint Joseph's University (then Saint Joseph's College) and played college basketball for the Hawks from 1947 to 1950. He emerged as a star forward for the team and scored 1,471 points in his career. Senesky was drafted by the Philadelphia Warriors of the National Basketball Association (NBA), where his brother played, but he turned down a contract to instead attend the Temple University School of Law. He paid for his tuition by playing for the Sunbury Mercuries of the Eastern Professional Basketball League (EPBL), where he led the league in scoring with 537 points and was selected to the All-EPBL First Team in 1950–51. He won an EPBL championship with the Mercuries in 1951.

== Later life ==
Senesky practiced law in the Philadelphia area for 30 years until his retirement in 1988. He specialised in admiralty law, then negligence cases as a defense lawyer, and finally in products liability.

Senesky died in Pompano Beach, Florida, on July 11, 1994, aged 69.
