= 2007–08 Xavier Musketeers men's basketball team =

American college basketball season

2007–08 Xavier Musketeers men's basketball

Atlantic 10 regular season champions

NCAA tournament, Elite Eight
- Conference: Atlantic 10 Conference

Ranking
- Coaches: No. 8
- AP: No. 12
- Record: 30–7 (14–2 A-10)
- Head coach: Sean Miller (4th season)
- Assistant coaches: Chris Mack; James Whitford; Emanuel Richardson
- Home arena: Cintas Center

2007–08 Atlantic 10 men's basketball standings
	Conf.				Overall
Team	W		L	PCT	W		L	PCT
No. 12 Xavier	14	–	2	.875	30	–	7	.811
Temple †	11	–	5	.688	21	–	13	.618
UMass	10	–	6	.625	25	–	11	.694
Saint Joseph's	9	–	7	.563	21	–	13	.618
Charlotte	9	–	7	.563	20	–	14	.588
Richmond	9	–	7	.563	16	–	15	.516
Dayton	8	–	8	.500	23	–	11	.676
La Salle	8	–	8	.500	15	–	17	.469
Rhode Island	7	–	9	.438	21	–	12	.636
Duquesne	7	–	9	.438	17	–	13	.567
Saint Louis	7	–	9	.438	16	–	15	.516
Fordham	6	–	10	.375	12	–	17	.414
George Washington	5	–	11	.313	9	–	17	.346
St. Bonaventure	2	–	14	.125	8	–	22	.267
† 2008 Atlantic 10 Tournament winner Rankings from AP poll

The 2007–08 Xavier Musketeers men's basketball team represented Xavier University in the 2007–08 college basketball season. They were led by head coach Sean Miller in his fourth season at Xavier. The Musketeers were members of the Atlantic 10 Conference and played their home games at the Cintas Center. Xavier finished the season with a record of 30–7, 14–2 in A-10 play to win the regular season championship. The Musketeers lost in the semifinals of the A-10 tournament to Saint Joseph's. They received an at-large bid to the NCAA tournament as the No. 3 seed in the West region. The Musketeers defeated Georgia, Purdue, and West Virginia to advance to the Elite Eight before losing to UCLA.

== Roster ==
2007–08 Xavier Musketeers men's basketball team
Players
Coaches

Pos.	#	Name	Height	Weight	Year	Previous school	Hometown
F	1	Josh Duncan	6 ft 8 in (2.03 m)	225 lb (102 kg)	Sr	Moeller HS	Cincinnati, OH
G	2	Adrion Graves	6 ft 4 in (1.93 m)	200 lb (91 kg)	So	Hughes Center	Cincinnati, OH
F	5	Derrick Brown	6 ft 8 in (2.03 m)	225 lb (102 kg)	So	Chaminade Julienne HS	Dayton, OH
G/F	11	B. J. Raymond	6 ft 6 in (1.98 m)	225 lb (102 kg)	Jr	St. John's Jesuit HS	Toledo, OH
G	13	Stephen Duckett	6 ft 4 in (1.93 m)	190 lb (86 kg)	Fr	Bishop Byrne HS	Memphis, TN
F	15	Andrew Taylor	6 ft 8 in (2.03 m)	215 lb (98 kg)	So	St. John's Jesuit HS	Toledo, OH
G/F	20	C. J. Anderson	6 ft 6 in (1.98 m)	220 lb (100 kg)	Jr	Winton Woods HS	Cincinnati, OH
F	22	Jamel McLean	6 ft 8 in (2.03 m)	245 lb (111 kg)	So	Bethel High HS	Hampton, VA
G	24	Drew Lavender	5 ft 7 in (1.7 m)	153 lb (69 kg)	Sr	Brookhaven HS	Columbus, OH
G	25	Dante' Jackson	6 ft 5 in (1.96 m)	205 lb (93 kg)	Fr	McClain HS	Greenfield, OH
F/C	31	Jason Love	6 ft 9 in (2.06 m)	265 lb (120 kg)	So	Abington Friends	Philadelphia, PA
F	33	Joe Hughes	6 ft 6 in (1.98 m)	200 lb (91 kg)	Fr	Cathedral HS	Indianapolis, IN
G	34	Stanley Burrell	6 ft 3 in (1.91 m)	210 lb (95 kg)	Sr	Ben Davis HS; Hargrave Military Academy	Indianapolis, IN

Head coach

- Sean Miller (Pittsburgh)

Assistant coach(es)

- Chris Mack (Xavier)
- James Whitford (Wisconsin)
- Emanuel Richardson

Legend

- (C) Team captain
- (S) Suspended
- (I) Ineligible
- (W) Walk-on
- Injured
- Current redshirt

Roster

== Schedule and results ==
Date time, TV	Rank^{#}	Opponent^{#}	Result	Record	Site (attendance) city, state
Regular season
Nov 10, 2007*		Southeast Missouri State	W 90–59	1–0	Cintas Center; Cincinnati, Ohio
Nov 13, 2007*		at Miami (OH)	L 57–59	1–1	Millett Hall; Oxford, Ohio
Nov 20, 2007*		Coppin State	W 98–49	2–1	Cintas Center; Cincinnati, Ohio
Nov 23, 2007*		vs. Kent State	W 78–65	3–1	Sears Centre; Hoffman Estates, Illinois
Nov 24, 2007*		vs. No. 8 Indiana	W 80–65	4–1	Sears Centre; Hoffman Estates, Illinois
Nov 28, 2007*	No. 23	Oakland	W 93–68	5–1	Cintas Center; Cincinnati, Ohio
Dec 1, 2007*	No. 23	Belmont	W 90–49	6–1	Cintas Center; Cincinnati, Ohio
Dec 5, 2007*	No. 21	Creighton	W 79–66	7–1	Cintas Center; Cincinnati, Ohio
Dec 12, 2007*	No. 17	Cincinnati	W 64–59	8–1	Cintas Center; Cincinnati, Ohio
Dec 15, 2007*	No. 17	at Arizona State	L 55–77	8–2	Wells Fargo Arena; Tempe, Arizona
Dec 22, 2007*		No. 12 Tennessee	L 75–82	8–3	Cintas Center; Cincinnati, Ohio
Dec 28, 2007*		Delaware State	W 65–33	9–3	Cintas Center; Cincinnati, Ohio
Dec 31, 2007*		vs. Kansas State	W 103–77	10–3	Riverfront Coliseum; Cincinnati, Ohio
Jan 3, 2008*		Virginia	W 108–70	11–3	Cintas Center; Cincinnati, Ohio
Jan 6, 2008*		at Auburn	W 80–57	12–3	Beard-Eaves-Memorial Coliseum; Auburn, Alabama
Jan 9, 2008	No. 24	St. Bonaventure	W 83–68	13–3 (1–0)	Cintas Center; Cincinnati, Ohio
Jan 12, 2008	No. 24	Fordham	W 68–50	14–3 (2–0)	Cintas Center; Cincinnati, Ohio
Jan 16, 2008	No. 20	at Temple	L 59–78	14–4 (2–1)	Liacouras Center; Philadelphia, Pennsylvania
Jan 19, 2008	No. 20	at George Washington	W 74–66	15–4 (3–1)	Charles E. Smith Center; Washington, D.C.
Jan 24, 2008	No. 23	No. 16 Dayton	W 69–43	16–4 (4–1)	Cintas Center; Cincinnati, Ohio
Jan 27, 2008*	No. 23	at UMass	W 77–65	17–4 (5–1)	Mullins Center; Amherst, Massachusetts
Feb 2, 2008	No. 15	La Salle	W 75–62	18–4 (6–1)	Cintas Center; Cincinnati, Ohio
Feb 7, 2008	No. 13	at Saint Louis	W 70–68	19–4 (7–1)	Scottrade Center; St. Louis, Missouri
Feb 10, 2008	No. 13	Saint Joseph's	W 76–72	20–4 (8–1)	Cintas Center; Cincinnati, Ohio
Feb 13, 2008	No. 12	at UNC Charlotte	W 62–60	21–4 (9–1)	Dale F. Halton Arena; Charlotte, North Carolina
Feb 18, 2008	No. 10	at Rhode Island	W 81–77	22–4 (10–1)	Thomas M. Ryan Center; Kingston, Rhode Island
Feb 21, 2008	No. 10	Duquesne	W 75–48	23–4 (11–1)	Cintas Center; Cincinnati, Ohio
Feb 24, 2008	No. 10	at Dayton	W 57–51	24–4 (12–1)	UD Arena; Dayton, Ohio
Mar 1, 2008	No. 9	George Washington	W 66–56	25–4 (13–1)	Cintas Center; Cincinnati, Ohio
Mar 6, 2008	No. 8	at Saint Joseph's	L 66–71	25–5 (13–2)	Hagan Arena; Philadelphia, Pennsylvania
Mar 8, 2008	No. 8	Richmond	W 86–61	26–5 (14–2)	Cintas Center; Cincinnati, Ohio
A-10 tournament
Mar 13, 2008*	(1) No. 10	vs. (8) Dayton; Quarterfinal	W 74–65	27–5	Boardwalk Hall; Atlantic City, New Jersey
Mar 14, 2008*	(1) No. 10	vs. (5) Saint Joseph's; Semifinal	L 53–61	27–6	Boardwalk Hall; Atlantic City, New Jersey
NCAA tournament
Mar 20, 2008*	(3 W) No. 12	vs. (14 W) Georgia; First round	W 73–61	28–6	Verizon Center; Washington, D.C.
Mar 22, 2008*	(3 W) No. 12	vs. (6 W) No. 20 Purdue; Second Round	W 85–78	29–6	Verizon Center; Washington, D.C.
Mar 27, 2008*	(3 W) No. 12	vs. (7 W) West Virginia; West Regional semifinal – Sweet Sixteen	W 79–75 ^{OT}	30–6	US Airways Center (18,103); Phoenix, Arizona
Mar 29, 2008*	(3 W) No. 12	vs. (1 W) No. 3 UCLA; West Regional final – Elite Eight	L 57–76	30–7	US Airways Center (18,103); Phoenix, Arizona
*Non-conference game. ^{#}Rankings from AP Poll. (#) Tournament seedings in parentheses. W=West.

== Rankings ==
Ranking movements Legend: ██ Increase in ranking ██ Decrease in ranking — = Not ranked RV = Received votes
	Week																				
Poll	Pre	1	2	3	4	5	6	7	8	9	10	11	12	13	14	15	16	17	18	19	Final
AP	—	—	—	23	21	17	RV	RV	RV	24	20	23	15	13	12	10	9	8	10	12	Not released
Coaches	—	—	—	25	20	17	24	RV	RV	25	20	22	15	14	13	12	11	11	12	12	8
