= 2007–08 UMass Minutemen basketball team =

American college basketball season

2007–08 UMass Minutemen men's basketball

NIT, Finals
- Conference: Atlantic 10 Conference
- Record: 25-11 (10-6 A-10)
- Head coach: Travis Ford (3rd season)
- Assistant coaches: Adam Ginsburg; Tim Maloney; Steve Middleton
- Home arena: William D. Mullins Memorial Center

2007–08 Atlantic 10 men's basketball standings
	Conf.				Overall
Team	W		L	PCT	W		L	PCT
No. 12 Xavier	14	–	2	.875	30	–	7	.811
Temple †	11	–	5	.688	21	–	13	.618
UMass	10	–	6	.625	25	–	11	.694
Saint Joseph's	9	–	7	.563	21	–	13	.618
Charlotte	9	–	7	.563	20	–	14	.588
Richmond	9	–	7	.563	16	–	15	.516
Dayton	8	–	8	.500	23	–	11	.676
La Salle	8	–	8	.500	15	–	17	.469
Rhode Island	7	–	9	.438	21	–	12	.636
Duquesne	7	–	9	.438	17	–	13	.567
Saint Louis	7	–	9	.438	16	–	15	.516
Fordham	6	–	10	.375	12	–	17	.414
George Washington	5	–	11	.313	9	–	17	.346
St. Bonaventure	2	–	14	.125	8	–	22	.267
† 2008 Atlantic 10 Tournament winner Rankings from AP poll

The 2007–08 UMass Minutemen basketball team represented the University of Massachusetts Amherst during the 2007–08 NCAA Division I men's basketball season. The Minutemen, led by third year head coach Travis Ford, played their home games at William D. Mullins Memorial Center and are members of the Atlantic 10 Conference. They finished the season 25–11, 10–6 in A-10 play to finish for third place.

UMass reached the championship game of the 2008 NIT, where they lost to Ohio State.

== Roster ==
Number	Name	Position	Height	Weight	Year	Hometown
1	Papa Lo	Forward/Center	6–9	215	Freshman	Theis, Senegal
2	Sedale Jones	Guard	6–4	190	Freshman	Pittsfield, Massachusetts
3	Gary Forbes	Forward/Guard	6–7	220	RS Senior	Brooklyn, New York
4	Anthony Gurley	Guard	6–3	185	Sophomore	Boston, Massachusetts
5	Ricky Harris	Guard	6–2	175	Sophomore	Baltimore, Maryland
11	Gary Correia	Guard	6–1	180	Freshman	Providence, Rhode Island
12	Matt Pennie	Forward	6–7	210	Graduate Student	Hanson, Massachusetts
13	Max Groebe	Guard	6–4	185	Freshman	North Miami Beach, Florida
14	Chris Lowe	Guard	6–0	160	Junior	Mount Vernon, New York
20	Dante Milligan	Forward	6–9	215	RS Senior	New York, New York
21	Trey Lang	Forward	6–7	215	Freshman	Marietta, Georgia
22	Etienne Brower	Forward	6–7	215	RS Senior	West Hempsted, New York
24	Tony Gaffney	Forward	6–8	208	RS Junior	Berkley, Massachusetts
31	Luke Bonner	Center	7-1	245	RS Junior	Concord, New Hampshire
33	Matt Glass	Guard	6–7	190	Freshman	Underhill Center, Vermont
40	Nana Ampim	Guard	6–1	195	Senior	London, England
50	Matt Hill	Forward	6–7	210	Freshman	Middletown, Connecticut

== Schedule ==
Date time, TV	Rank^{#}	Opponent^{#}	Result	Record	Site (attendance) city, state
Exhibition
11/01/2007*; 7:30 pm		AIC	W 103-66		Mullins Center (1,982); Amherst, Massachusetts
1/0/2007*; 9:30 pm		Concordia (NY)	W 107-80		Curry Hicks Cage (1,002); Amherst, MA
Regular Season
11/09/2007*; 3:00 pm		vs. Cal Poly; BTI Tipoff Tournament	W 90-64	1–0	McLeod Center (206); Cedar Falls, Iowa
11/10/2007*; 6:30 pm		vs. Northern Illinois; BTI Tipoff Tournament	W 102-87	2–0	McLeod Center (312); Cedar Falls, Iowa
11/11/2007*; 5:00 pm		vs. Northern Iowa; BTI Tipoff Tournament	L 68-75	2–1	McLeod Center (4,503); Cedar Falls, Iowa
11/14/2007*; 8:00 pm		Yale	W 89–80	3–1	Mullins Center (3,548); Amherst, MA
11/17/2007*; 7:30 pm		Wisconsin-Green Bay	W 93–78	4–1	Mullins Center (4,025); Amherst, MA
11/28/2007*; 7:00 pm		at Syracuse	W 107-100	5–1	Carrier Dome (20,644); Syracuse, New York
12/01/2007*; 7:00 pm		at IUPUI	L 77–89	5-2	IUPUI Gymnasium (1,123); Indianapolis, Indiana
12/08/2007*; 7:30 pm		vs. Marist	W 83-68	6-2	Mohegan Sun Arena (2,642); Uncasville, Connecticut
12/12/2007*; 9:00 pm		at Boston College	W 83–80	7-2	Conte Forum (5,162); Chestnut Hill, Massachusetts
12/15/2007*; 7:30 pm		Toledo	W 68-61	8-2	Mullins Center (4,349); Amherst, MA
12/22/2007*; 7:30 pm		Central Connecticut State	W 79-55	9-2	Mullins Center (3,895); Amherst, MA
12/29/2007*; 7:30 pm		Boston University	W 70-61	10-2	Mullins Center (4,482); Amherst, MA
1/02/2008*; 7:00 pm		Houston	W 95-89	11-2	Mullins Center (4,321); Amherst, MA
1/05/2008*; 4:00 pm		at Vanderbilt	L 88-97	11-3	Memorial Gymnasium (13,750); Nashville, Tennessee
1/09/2008; 7:30 pm		St. Joseph's	L 92-98	11-4 (0-1)	Mullins Center (5,121); Amherst, MA
1/16/2008; 7:00 pm		at No. 14 Dayton	W 82-71	12-4 (1-1)	University of Dayton Arena (13,435); Dayton, Ohio
01/19/2008; 4:00 pm		Charlotte	W 86-79	13-4 (2–1)	Mullins Center (6,628); Amherst, MA
01/23/2008; 6:00 pm		at St. Joseph's	L 77-81	13-5 (2–2)	Alumni Memorial Fieldhouse (3,200); Philadelphia, Pennsylvania
01/27/2008; 12:00 pm		No. 23 Xavier	L 65-77	13-6 (2–3)	Mullins Center (8,221); Amherst, MA
01/30/2008; 7:00 pm		at Duquesne	W 94-80	14-6 (3-3)	Palumbo Center (2,913); Pittsburgh, Pennsylvania
02/02/2008; 2:00 pm		at St. Louis	L 59-71	14-7 (3–4)	Scottrade Center (8,602); St. Louis, Missouri
02/07/2008; 8:00 pm		Rhode Island	W 78-76	15-7 (4-4)	Mullins Center (6,782); Amherst, MA
2/10/2008; 2:00 pm		at Temple	W 80-70 ^{OT}	15-8 (4–5)	Liacouras Center (6,506); Philadelphia, Pennsylvania
02/14/2008; 9:00 pm		Fordham	L 72-76	15-9 (4-6)	Mullins Center (4,521); Amherst, MA
02/17/2008; 2:00 pm		St. Louis	W 88-77	16-9 (5-6)	Mullins Center (5,149); Amherst, MA
02/21/2008; 7:00 pm		at Rhode Island	W 98-91	17-9 (6-6)	Ryan Center (7,657); Kingston, Rhode Island
02/24/2008; 2:00 pm		St. Bonaventure	W 79-56	18-9 (7-6)	Mullins Center (5,998); Amherst, MA
03/01/2008; 7:00 pm		at Richmond	W 78-74	19-9 (8-6)	Robins Center (5,074); Richmond, Virginia
03/05/2008; 7:30 pm		La Salle	W 100-63	20-9 (9-6)	Mullins Center (6,122); Amherst, MA
03/08/2008; 7:30 pm		at George Washington	W 67-63	21-9 (10-6)	Charles E. Smith Athletic Center (3,294); Washington, DC
2008 Atlantic 10 men's basketball tournament
03/13/2008; 9:00 pm		vs. Charlotte; 1st Round	L 65-69	21-10	Boardwalk Hall (4996); Atlantic City, New Jersey
2008 NIT
03/18/2008*; 6:00 pm, ESPNU		Stephen F. Austin; First Round	W 80-60	22–10	Mullins Center (2,112); Amherst, MA
03/22/2008*; 12:00 pm, ESPN		Akron; Second Round	W 68-63	23-10	Mullins Center (3,118); Amherst, MA
03/25/2008*; 7:00 pm, ESPN		at Syracuse; Quarterfinals	W 81-77	24–10	Carrier Dome (20,162); Syracuse, New York
04/01/2008*; 7:00 pm, ESPN2		vs. Florida; Semifinals	W 78-66	25–10	Madison Square Garden (??); New York, NY
04/03/2008*; 7:00 pm, ESPN		vs. Ohio State; Finals	L 85-92	25–11	Madison Square Garden (8,407); New York, NY
*Non-conference game. ^{#}Rankings from AP Poll. (#) Tournament seedings in parentheses. All times are in Eastern Time.
