= 2007–08 William & Mary Tribe men's basketball team =

American college basketball season

2007–08 William & Mary Tribe men's basketball
- Conference: Colonial Athletic Association
- Record: 17–16 (10–8 CAA)
- Head coach: Tony Shaver (5th season)
- Assistant coaches: Dee Vick; Antwan Jackson; Ben Wilkins; Jamie Smith (director of basketball operations)
- Home arena: Kaplan Arena

2007–08 CAA men's basketball standings
	Conf.				Overall
Team	W		L	PCT	W		L	PCT
VCU	15	–	3	.833	24	–	8	.750
UNC Wilmington	12	–	6	.667	20	–	13	.606
George Mason †	12	–	6	.667	23	–	11	.676
Old Dominion	11	–	7	.611	18	–	16	.529
William & Mary	10	–	8	.556	17	–	16	.515
Northeastern	9	–	9	.500	14	–	17	.452
Delaware	9	–	9	.500	14	–	17	.452
Hofstra	8	–	10	.444	12	–	18	.400
Towson	7	–	11	.389	13	–	18	.419
Drexel	5	–	13	.278	12	–	20	.375
James Madison	5	–	13	.278	13	–	17	.433
Georgia State	5	–	13	.278	9	–	21	.300
† 2008 CAA tournament winner Rankings from AP poll

The 2007–08 William & Mary Tribe men's basketball team represented The College of William & Mary during the 2007–08 college basketball season. This was head coach Tony Shaver's fifth season at William & Mary. The Tribe competed in the Colonial Athletic Association and played their home games at Kaplan Arena. They finished the season 17–16, 10–8 in CAA play and lost in the championship game of the 2008 CAA men's basketball tournament to George Mason after a surprising run through the tournament with wins against Georgia State in the first round, rivals Old Dominion in the quarterfinals, and VCU in the semifinals. They did not participate in any post-season tournaments.
