= 2008 Atlantic 10 men's basketball tournament =

- Classification: Division I
- Season: 2007–08
- Teams: 12
- Site: Boardwalk Hall; Atlantic City, New Jersey
- Champions: Temple (7th title)
- Winning coach: Fran Dunphy (1st title)
- MVP: Dionte Christmas (Temple)

2007–08 Atlantic 10 men's basketball standings
	Conf.				Overall
Team	W		L	PCT	W		L	PCT
No. 12 Xavier	14	–	2	.875	30	–	7	.811
Temple †	11	–	5	.688	21	–	13	.618
UMass	10	–	6	.625	25	–	11	.694
Saint Joseph's	9	–	7	.563	21	–	13	.618
Charlotte	9	–	7	.563	20	–	14	.588
Richmond	9	–	7	.563	16	–	15	.516
Dayton	8	–	8	.500	23	–	11	.676
La Salle	8	–	8	.500	15	–	17	.469
Rhode Island	7	–	9	.438	21	–	12	.636
Duquesne	7	–	9	.438	17	–	13	.567
Saint Louis	7	–	9	.438	16	–	15	.516
Fordham	6	–	10	.375	12	–	17	.414
George Washington	5	–	11	.313	9	–	17	.346
St. Bonaventure	2	–	14	.125	8	–	22	.267
† 2008 Atlantic 10 Tournament winner Rankings from AP poll

The 2008 Atlantic 10 men's basketball tournament was played at Boardwalk Hall in Atlantic City, New Jersey from March 12 to March 15, 2008. By winning the tournament, Temple received an automatic bid to the 2008 NCAA Men's Division I Basketball Tournament and was crowned Atlantic 10 Conference champion. Xavier and Saint Joseph's also received at-large bids to the NCAA tournament. Dionte Christmas of Temple was named the tournament's Most Outstanding Player.

== Seeding ==
The seeding for the tournament is based on regular-season record during Atlantic 10 Conference play. Each team played a 16-game schedule. Charlotte, Richmond, and Saint Joseph's all finished with records of 9–7. Richmond won the tiebreaker by having a 2–1 record among the tied schools. Saint Joseph's came second from the tiebreaker with a record of 1–1. Also, La Salle and Dayton both finished with 8–8 records. La Salle won the tiebreaker by beating Dayton during the regular season. Lastly, Duquesne, Rhode Island, and Saint Louis all finished with records of 7–9. Since the teams were all 1–1 in games amongst each other, the tie was broken by record against the highest-ranked teams in the conference. In the end, Saint Louis won the tiebreaker as a result of a 1–1 record vs. Massachusetts. Duquesne (0–1 vs. Massachusetts) then got the tiebreaker over Rhode Island (0–2).

The top four teams receive byes to the second round of the tournament. Because they did not finish in the top 12 in the Atlantic 10, George Washington and St. Bonaventure did not qualify for the tournament.

== Bracket ==
First round March 12
8	Dayton	63*
9	Saint Louis	62
5	Saint Joseph's	80
12	Fordham	62
7	La Salle	82
10	Duquesne	79
6	Charlotte	75
11	Rhode Island	73

Second round March 13
1	#10 Xavier	74
8	Dayton	65
4	Richmond	47
5	St. Joseph's	61
2	Temple	84
7	La Salle	75
3	Massachusetts	65
6	Charlotte	69

Semifinals; March 14
1	#10 Xavier	53
5	St. Joseph's	61
2	Temple	60
6	Charlotte	45

Championship Game; March 15
5	St. Joseph's	64
2	Temple	69

Asterisk denotes game ended in overtime.
