= 2007–08 VCU Rams men's basketball team =

American college basketball season

2007–08 VCU Rams men's basketball

CAA regular season champions

NIT, First Round
- Conference: Colonial Athletic Association
- Record: 24–8 (15–3 CAA)
- Head coach: Anthony Grant
- Assistant coaches: Tony Pujol; John Brannen; Allen Edwards
- Home arena: Stuart C. Siegel Center

2007–08 CAA men's basketball standings
	Conf.				Overall
Team	W		L	PCT	W		L	PCT
VCU	15	–	3	.833	24	–	8	.750
UNC Wilmington	12	–	6	.667	20	–	13	.606
George Mason †	12	–	6	.667	23	–	11	.676
Old Dominion	11	–	7	.611	18	–	16	.529
William & Mary	10	–	8	.556	17	–	16	.515
Northeastern	9	–	9	.500	14	–	17	.452
Delaware	9	–	9	.500	14	–	17	.452
Hofstra	8	–	10	.444	12	–	18	.400
Towson	7	–	11	.389	13	–	18	.419
Drexel	5	–	13	.278	12	–	20	.375
James Madison	5	–	13	.278	13	–	17	.433
Georgia State	5	–	13	.278	9	–	21	.300
† 2008 CAA tournament winner Rankings from AP poll

The 2007–08 VCU Rams men's basketball team represented Virginia Commonwealth University during the 2007–08 NCAA Division I men's basketball season. The Rams played in the Colonial Athletic Association. They earned an invitation to the 2008 National Invitation Tournament, where they were defeated in the first round by UAB.

== Schedule ==
Date	Opponent^{#}	Rank^{#}	Site	Result	Record
Regular season
11/09/07	Maryland Eastern Shore		Stuart C. Siegel Center • Richmond, Virginia	W 70–51	1–0
11/15/07	vs. Houston		Coliseo Rubén Rodríguez • Bayamón, PR (Puerto Rico Tip-Off First Round)	W 73–72	2–0
11/16/07	vs. Miami (FL)		Coliseo Rubén Rodríguez • Bayamón, PR (Puerto Rico Tip-Off Semifinals)	L 63–69	2–1
11/18/07	vs. #18 Arkansas		Coliseo Rubén Rodríguez • Bayamón, PR (Puerto Rico Tip-Off Consolation Game)	L 60–70	2–2
11/24/07	Elon		Stuart C. Siegel Center • Richmond, Virginia	W 79–61	3–2
11/29/07	at Hampton		Hampton Convocation Center • Hampton, Virginia	L 55–64	3–3
12/02/07	vs. Maryland		Verizon Center • Washington, D.C. (BB&T Classic)	W 85–76	4–3
12/05/07	William & Mary		Stuart C. Siegel Center • Richmond, Virginia	W 71–57	5–3 (1–0)
12/08/07	Richmond Spiders		Stuart C. Siegel Center • Richmond, Virginia	W 65-45	6-3
12/15/07	Longwood		Stuart C. Siegel Center • Richmond, Virginia	W 78-45	7-3
12/22/07	at Bradley		Carver Arena • Peoria, Illinois	W 79-64	8-3
01/02/08	at James Madison		Convocation Center • Harrisonburg, Virginia	L 61-62	8-4 (1-1)
01/05/08	at UNC Wilmington		Trask Coliseum • Wilmington, North Carolina	W 72-57	9-4 (2-1)
01/10/08	Georgia State		Stuart C. Siegel Center • Richmond, Virginia	W 49-47	10-4 (3-1)
01/12/08	Hofstra		Stuart C. Siegel Center • Richmond, Virginia	W 59-49	11-4 (4-1)
01/16/08	Delaware		Stuart C. Siegel Center • Richmond, Virginia	W 60-39	12-4 (5-1)
01/19/08	at Old Dominion		Ted Constant Convocation Center • Norfolk, Virginia	W 78-68	13-4 (6-1)
01/23/08	at Hofstra		Hofstra Arena • Hempstead, New York	W 82-65	14-4 (7-1)
01/26/08	Drexel		Stuart C. Siegel Center • Richmond, Virginia	W 76-62	15-4 (8-1)
01/29/08	at George Mason		Patriot Center • Fairfax, Virginia	L 51-63	15-5 (8-2)
02/02/08	Towson		Stuart C. Siegel Center • Richmond, Virginia	W 65-42	16-5 (9-2)
02/06/08	at Georgia State		GSU Sports Arena • Atlanta	W 65-60^{OT}	17-5 (10-2)
02/09/08	at Delaware		Bob Carpenter Center • Newark, Delaware	W 83-73	18-5 (11-2)
02/13/08	James Madison		Stuart C. Siegel Center • Richmond, Virginia	W 75-56	19-5 (12-2)
02/16/08	Old Dominion		Stuart C. Siegel Center • Richmond, Virginia	L 66-67	19-6 (12-3)
02/20/08	at Northeastern		Matthews Arena • Boston	W 66-62	20-6 (13-3)
02/23/08	at Akron		James A. Rhodes Arena • Akron, Ohio (ESPNU BracketBusters)	W 57-52	21-6
02/27/08	UNC Wilmington		Stuart C. Siegel Center • Richmond, Virginia	W 72-58	22-6 (14-3)
03/03/08	at William & Mary		Kaplan Arena • Williamsburg, Virginia	W 54-43	23-6 (15-3)
CAA tournament
03/08/08	vs. Towson		Richmond Coliseum • Richmond, Virginia (quarterfinals)	W 57-46	24-6
03/09/08	vs. William & Mary		Richmond Coliseum • Richmond, Virginia (semifinals)	L 54-56	24-7
National Invitation tournament
03/19/08	vs. UAB		Stuart C. Siegel Center • Richmond, Virginia (first round)	L 77-80	24-8
