= 2007–08 Temple Owls men's basketball team =

American college basketball season

2007–08 Temple Owls men's basketball

A-10 Tournament Champions

NCAA tournament, first round
- Conference: Atlantic 10 Conference
- Record: 21–13 (11–5 A-10)
- Head coach: Fran Dunphy
- Assistant coaches: Dave Duke; Matt Langel; Shawn Trice
- Home arena: Liacouras Center

2007–08 Atlantic 10 men's basketball standings
	Conf.				Overall
Team	W		L	PCT	W		L	PCT
No. 12 Xavier	14	–	2	.875	30	–	7	.811
Temple †	11	–	5	.688	21	–	13	.618
UMass	10	–	6	.625	25	–	11	.694
Saint Joseph's	9	–	7	.563	21	–	13	.618
Charlotte	9	–	7	.563	20	–	14	.588
Richmond	9	–	7	.563	16	–	15	.516
Dayton	8	–	8	.500	23	–	11	.676
La Salle	8	–	8	.500	15	–	17	.469
Rhode Island	7	–	9	.438	21	–	12	.636
Duquesne	7	–	9	.438	17	–	13	.567
Saint Louis	7	–	9	.438	16	–	15	.516
Fordham	6	–	10	.375	12	–	17	.414
George Washington	5	–	11	.313	9	–	17	.346
St. Bonaventure	2	–	14	.125	8	–	22	.267
† 2008 Atlantic 10 Tournament winner Rankings from AP poll

The 2007–08 Temple Owls men's basketball team represented Temple University in the 2007–08 NCAA Division I men's basketball season. They were led by head coach Fran Dunphy and played their home games at the Liacouras Center. The Owls are members of the Atlantic 10 Conference.

On December 29, 2007, Temple lost to Florida 86-69 in the Orange Bowl Basketball Classic.

They finished the season 21–13 and 11–5 in A-10 play. They won the 2008 Atlantic 10 men's basketball tournament to receive the conference's automatic bid to the 2008 NCAA Division I men's basketball tournament. The Owls were eliminated in the Round of 64 by #5 Michigan State.

== Roster ==
#	Name	Height	Weight (lbs.)	Position	Class	Hometown		High school
1	Chris Clark	5 ft 8 in (1.73 m)	165 pounds (75 kg)	G	Sr.	Narberth, Pennsylvania	U.S.	St. Joseph's Prep
2	Ryan Brooks	6 ft 4 in (1.93 m)	200 pounds (91 kg)	G	So.	Narberth, Pennsylvania	U.S.	Lower Merion HS
5	Martavis Kee	6 ft 2 in (1.88 m)	190 pounds (86 kg)	G	Fr.	Fort Lauderdale, Florida	U.S.	St. Thomas Aquinas HS
10	Luis Guzman	6 ft 3 in (1.91 m)	200 pounds (91 kg)	G	So.	New York City, New York	U.S.	Paramus Catholic HS
13	Mark Tyndale	6 ft 5 in (1.96 m)	210 pounds (95 kg)	G	Sr.	Philadelphia, Pennsylvania	U.S.	Simon Gratz HS
15	Semaj Inge	6 ft 4 in (1.93 m)	190 pounds (86 kg)	G	Jr.	Camden, New Jersey	U.S.	Woodrow Wilson HS
21	Rafael DeLeon	6 ft 5 in (1.96 m)	200 pounds (91 kg)	F	So.	District Heights, Maryland	U.S.	Bishop McNamara HS
22	Dionte Christmas	6 ft 5 in (1.96 m)	205 pounds (93 kg)	G	Jr.	Philadelphia, Pennsylvania	U.S.	Lutheran Christian Academy
24	Lavoy Allen	6 ft 9 in (2.06 m)	225 pounds (102 kg)	F	Fr.	Morrisville, Pennsylvania	U.S.	Pennsbury HS
30	Craig Williams	6 ft 9 in (2.06 m)	240 pounds (110 kg)	F	Fr.	Christiansted, U.S. Virgin Islands	U.S.	St. Croix Central HS
41	Sergio Olmos	7 ft 0 in (2.13 m)	220 pounds (100 kg)	C	Jr.	Valencia	Spain	Vincente Blasco Ibanez HS
43	Orlando Miller	6 ft 6 in (1.98 m)	190 pounds (86 kg)	F	Sr.	Lanham, Maryland	U.S.	High Point HS
