= Folarin Campbell =

Nigerian-American basketball player

Free agent
- Position: Shooting guard / small forward

Personal information
- Born: February 27, 1986 (age 40) Silver Spring, Maryland, U.S.
- Listed height: 6 ft 4 in (1.93 m)
- Listed weight: 205 lb (93 kg)

Career information
- High school: Springbrook (Silver Spring, Maryland)
- College: George Mason (2004–2008)
- NBA draft: 2008: undrafted
- Playing career: 2008–present

Career history
- 2008–2009: Solsonica Rieti
- 2009–2010: Artland Dragons
- 2010–2011: Telekom Baskets Bonn
- 2011: FastWeb Casale Monferrato
- 2011–2012: Pallacanestro Sant'Antimo
- 2012–2013: BK Ventspils
- 2013–2014: Enel Brindisi
- 2014–2015: MHP Riesen Ludwigsburg
- 2015: Orlandina Basket
- 2015–2016: Czarni Słupsk
- 2016–2017: BK Ventspils
- 2017–2018: Maccabi Kiryat Motzkin

Folarin Yaovi Campbell (born February 27, 1986) is a Nigerian-American basketball player who last played for Maccabi Kiryat Motzkin of the Israeli National League. He played college basketball for the George Mason Patriots. Campbell started at guard for the Patriots, including during his sophomore season when the Patriots made their improbable run to the NCAA Tournament's Final Four in 2006. The team was nicknamed the Cinderella Team.

== Career ==
Campbell is a former resident of Lanham, Maryland. While there, Campbell attended Glenridge Elementary School, Kenmoor Middle School, Charles Carroll Middle School, and Fairmont Heights High School for one year. In 2001, Campbell moved to Silver Spring, Maryland and became a 2004 graduate of Springbrook High School. At Springbrook, Campbell was selected first-team All-Metropolitan by the Washington Post as a junior and senior and was the Montgomery County public schools' leading scorer as a junior, averaging 26.3 points per game.

Campbell chose to attend George Mason University over Providence, Boston College, Virginia Commonwealth, and Georgetown, among others. As a freshman during the 2004–05 season, he appeared in 29 games, started one and was named to the CAA all-Rookie team, averaging 6.4 points and 2.2 rebounds per game. As a sophomore, he was an integral part of George Mason's run to the 2006 Final Four, starting 34 of 35 games. He scored in double figures in all five of Mason's NCAA Tournament contest, with 21 against Michigan State, 15 against North Carolina, 16 against Wichita State and 15 against Connecticut. During his junior year, Campbell was named Third-Team All-CAA. He led the team in scoring, assists, 3-pointers and steals and was one of two players to finish among top 12 in the CAA in scoring, assists and steals. Campbell finished his career at George Mason by being selected to the Second-Team All-CAA team. He scored 15 or more points in 17 straight games heading into the NCAA Tournament that year (2007–08), and scored in double figures 76 times over his career. He is the only player in school history with 1,500 points, 450 rebounds, 350 assists, 150 3-pointers, 100 steals, and 50 blocks.

Campbell signed his first professional contract with Solsonica Rieti of Italy for Lega Basket Serie A 2008–09 campaign. Following year Campbell moved to Germany, spending 2009–2010 season with German Basketball Bundesliga team Artland Dragons. He played 2010–11 season for the Telekom Baskets Bonn in Germany. After two years in Germany, Campbell returned to Italy for short stint with FastWeb Casale Monferrato. Campbell spent 2011–2012 season playing for Italian LegaDue team Pallacanestro Sant'Antimo. In November 2012, he signed to play with Latvian team BK Ventspils. After stints with Enel Brindisi and MHP Riesen Ludwigsburg, he signed with Orlandina Basket on March 2, 2015.

On October 15, 2015, Campbell signed with Czarni Słupsk of the Polish Basketball League.

On September 29, 2017, Campbell signed with the Israeli team Maccabi Kiryat Motzkin of the Israeli National League for the 2017–18 season.

== Personal ==
Campbell is of Nigerian descent. His name Folarin in Yoruba means "Walking with wealth". He has inspired members of his own family to pursue careers in basketball. His parents are Quasi and Teni Campbell.
