= Danny Green (basketball) =

American basketball player (born 1987)

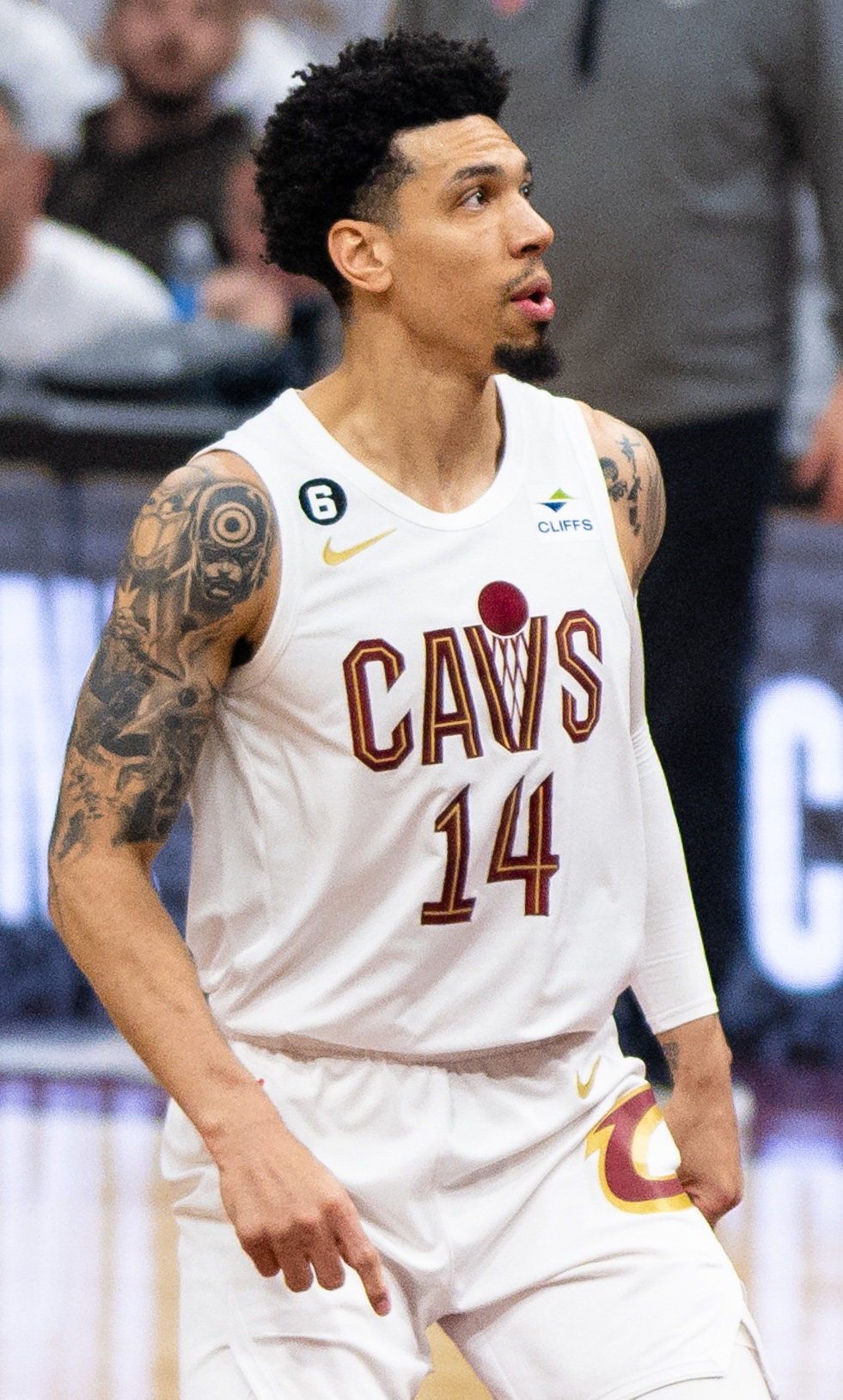
- Green with the Cleveland Cavaliers in 2023

Personal information
- Born: June 22, 1987 (age 39) North Babylon, New York, U.S.
- Listed height: 6 ft 6 in (1.98 m)
- Listed weight: 215 lb (98 kg)

Career information
- High school: North Babylon (North Babylon, New York); St. Mary's (Manhasset, New York)
- College: North Carolina (2005–2009)
- NBA draft: 2009: 2nd round, 46th overall pick
- Drafted by: Cleveland Cavaliers
- Playing career: 2009–2023
- Position: Shooting guard / small forward
- Number: 14, 4

Career history
- 2009–2010: Cleveland Cavaliers
- 2010: →Erie BayHawks
- 2010–2018: San Antonio Spurs
- 2011: →Reno Bighorns
- 2011: →Austin Toros
- 2011: →Union Olimpija
- 2018–2019: Toronto Raptors
- 2019–2020: Los Angeles Lakers
- 2020–2022: Philadelphia 76ers
- 2022–2023: Memphis Grizzlies
- 2023: Cleveland Cavaliers
- 2023: Philadelphia 76ers

Career highlights
- 3× NBA champion (2014, 2019, 2020); NBA All-Defensive Second Team (2017); Slovenian Cup champion (2011); NCAA champion (2009); Third-team All-ACC (2009); ACC All-Defensive Team (2009); McDonald's All-American (2005); Second-team Parade All-American (2005)

Career NBA statistics
- Points: 7,204 (8.7 ppg)
- Rebounds: 2,827 (3.4 rpg)
- Assists: 1,277 (1.5 apg)
- Stats at NBA.com
- Stats at Basketball Reference

Daniel Richard Green Jr. (born June 22, 1987) is an American former professional basketball player. In his NBA career, Green played for six teams. As of 2025, Green is one of just four players in history to have won NBA championships with three different teams; he won titles with the San Antonio Spurs in 2014, the Toronto Raptors in 2019, and the Los Angeles Lakers in 2020.

Green spent his college basketball career at the University of North Carolina (UNC) from 2005 to 2009. He played in more games (145) and had more wins (123) than any Tar Heel before him. In 2009, during his senior year at UNC, Green won an NCAA championship.

Green was selected by the Cleveland Cavaliers with the 46th overall pick in the 2009 NBA draft. After being waived by the Cavaliers, Green played for the San Antonio Spurs, the Reno Bighorns of the NBA Developmental League, and KK Olimpija in Slovenia. Green became a starting guard for the Spurs during the 2011–2012 season and remained with the Spurs until 2018. During the 2013 NBA Finals, Green set an NBA record for most three-point field goals made in a Finals series (23). He then won an NBA championship with the San Antonio Spurs in 2014. Known for his perimeter defense, Green was selected to the NBA All-Defensive Second Team in the 2016–17 season. In 2019, he won a second NBA championship in his only season with the Toronto Raptors. Green won a third championship in 2020 with the Los Angeles Lakers. He also played for the Philadelphia 76ers and the Memphis Grizzlies.

== High school career ==
As a high school freshman, Green attended North Babylon High School in North Babylon, New York, on Long Island and in addition to basketball, he played quarterback on the football team. From his sophomore year onwards, Green attended St. Mary's High School, a private school, in Manhasset, New York. He averaged 20 points, 10 rebounds, 4 assists and 4 blocks as a senior. Considered a four-star recruit by Rivals.com, Green was listed as the No. 8 shooting guard and the No. 31 player in the nation in 2005.

== College career ==
Green came off the bench as the sixth man during his freshman year at UNC. He averaged 5.2 points and 2.8 rebounds in his sophomore season. After his second year at North Carolina, Green considered transferring, but would ultimately finish his college career there.

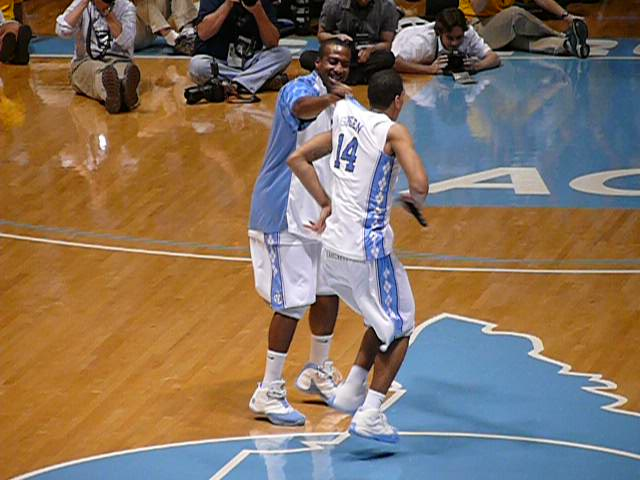
Green at UNC in 2009

In Green's junior year, he averaged 11.5 points, 4.9 rebounds, 2.0 assists, 1.9 turnovers, 1.2 steals, 1.2 blocks in 22.3 minutes per game. He also improved his true shooting percentage (TS%) significantly, increasing his field goal percentage to 46.9% and his free throw percentage to 87.3%. He shot 37.3% from the three-point line.

Approaching his senior season, Green declared himself eligible for the 2008 NBA draft. However, he refrained from signing with an agent so that he had the option to return to school, which he decided to do on June 16, 2008. He was named team captain alongside Bobby Frasor and Tyler Hansbrough for the year, and started every game as the Tar Heels won their fifth national championship. Green averaged 13.1 points, 4.7 rebounds, 2.7 assists, 1.7 turnovers, 1.8 steals and 1.3 blocks in 27.4 minutes per game for the season, again improving his shooting percentages, averaging 47.1% and 41.8% from the field and three-point line, respectively. Green was selected to the All-ACC third team, and the ACC's All-Defensive Team. He ended his college career with 1,368 points for the Tar Heels, and held the school's all-time record for wins, with 123. Green played in more games (145) than any Tar Heel before him. As of 2009, Green was also the only player in the history of the Atlantic Coast Conference (ACC) with at least 1,000 points, 500 rebounds, 250 assists, 150 three-pointers, 150 blocks and 150 steals.

== Professional career ==
=== Cleveland Cavaliers (2009–2010) ===
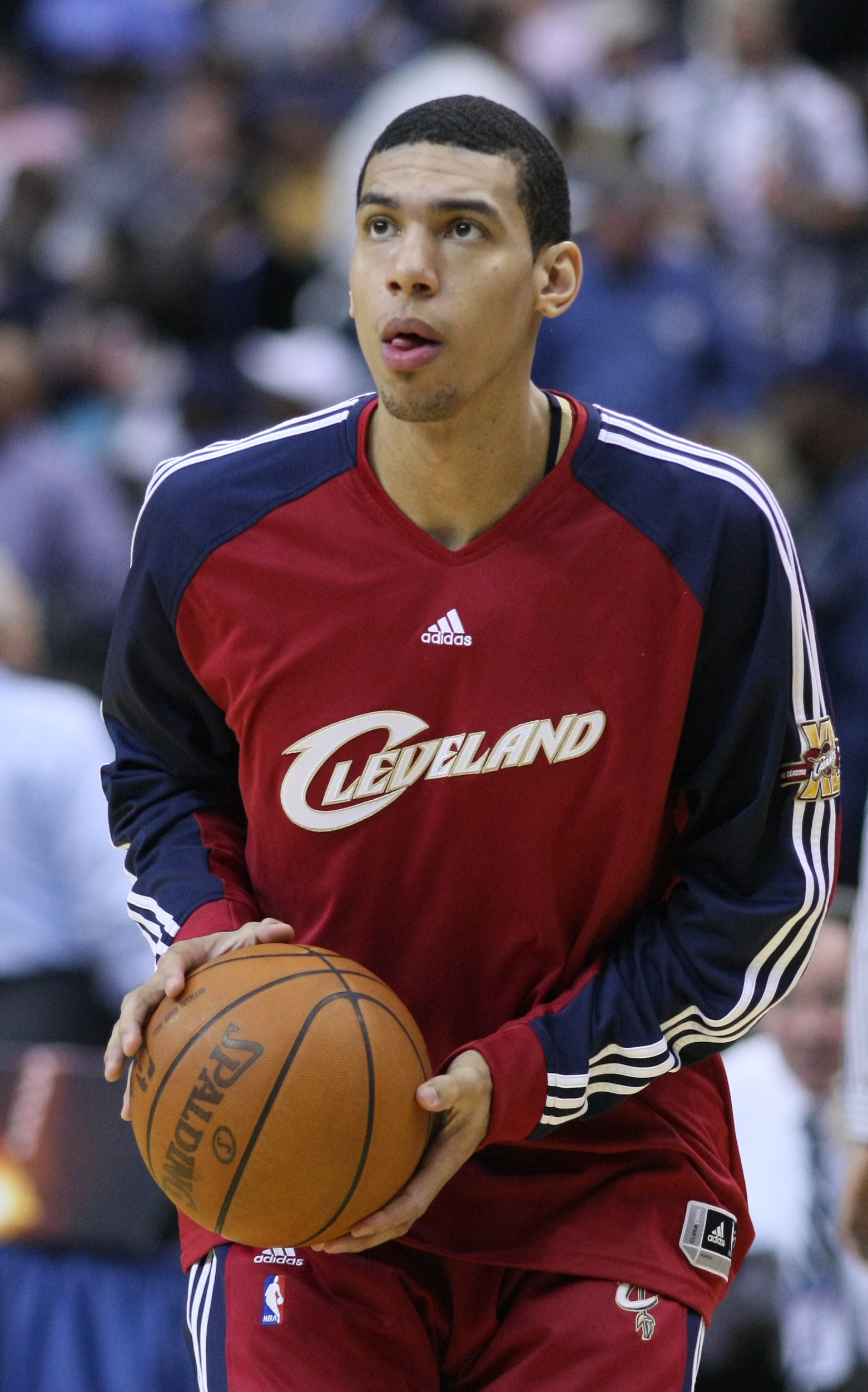
Danny Green with the Cleveland Cavaliers in November 2009

The Cleveland Cavaliers selected Green as the 46th overall pick of the 2009 NBA draft. After he played in 20 games in his rookie year with the Cavaliers, the team waived Green at the beginning of the next season.

=== San Antonio Spurs (2010) ===
Green was picked up by the San Antonio Spurs on November 17, 2010. The Spurs waived him six days later after he appeared in two games.

=== Reno Bighorns (2011) ===
In January 2011, Green was acquired by the Reno Bighorns of the NBA Development League. He averaged 20 points, a team high, and 7.5 rebounds in 16 games with the Bighorns.

=== Return to San Antonio (2011) ===
The Spurs signed Green again in March 2011, assigned him to the Austin Toros of the NBA Development League on April 2, and then recalled him on April 3.

=== Olimpija (2011) ===
In August 2011, Green signed a one-year contract with KK Union Olimpija, which included an NBA-out clause option when the 2011 NBA lockout ended.

=== Third stint with Spurs (2011–2018) ===
==== 2011–13: Playoff upsets ====
Green returned to the Spurs in 2011 after the lockout ended. Green had a breakout 2011–2012 season, starting 38 of his 66 games played and averaging 9.1 ppg. Green became the starting shooting guard for the Spurs when Manu Ginóbili returned to being the sixth man in the rotation. After the season, Green finished ninth in the league in voting for the NBA Most Improved Player Award.

On July 11, 2012, Green re-signed with the Spurs for $12 million over three years. In his first game of the season, he scored 9 points and added 2 blocks in San Antonio's win over the New Orleans Hornets. On November 1, 2012, he scored 13 points in a win over the Oklahoma City Thunder. Then on November 3, Green scored 21 points to help the Spurs beat the Utah Jazz in a 110–100 win. On November 13, 2012, he hit a game-winner against the Los Angeles Lakers, finishing the game with 11 points. On February 6, 2013, Green recorded career highs of 28 points and 8 three-pointers made in a win over the Minnesota Timberwolves. He was one three-point field goal shy of Chuck Person's record for most three-pointers made in a single game as a Spur.

In game 2 of the 2013 NBA Finals, Green was perfect from the field, including 5–5 from the three-point line. However, the Spurs lost in a blowout to the Miami Heat, 103–84. In game 3 of the NBA Finals, Green hit 7–9 from three-point range, including the one to set a Finals record for most three-pointers in a game by a team. He notched 27 total points in the Spurs' blowout 113–77 victory as the team took a 2–1 series lead in the process. On June 16 in game 5, Green made six three-pointers for a total of 25 in the series to that point, breaking the record for an NBA Finals series previously held by Ray Allen, who made 22 in six games with the Boston Celtics in 2008. By the end of the series, Green had made 27 three-pointers, but the Spurs lost the series in seven games. The record was later broken by Stephen Curry in 2016.

==== 2013–18: First championship and final years with Spurs ====
On April 11, 2014, Green scored a career-high 33 points in a 112–104 win over the Phoenix Suns. On June 15, 2014, Green won his first NBA championship after the Spurs defeated the Miami Heat 4 games to 1 in the 2014 NBA Finals. In doing so, Green joined Michael Jordan and James Worthy as the third Tar Heel to win both the NCAA and NBA championship.

On December 19, 2014, Green scored a season-high 27 points in the 119–129 triple overtime loss to the Portland Trail Blazers. On April 12, 2015, Green recorded 3 three-pointers against the Phoenix Suns to set a franchise record for the most three-pointers in a season at 191.

On July 14, 2015, Green re-signed with the Spurs to a reported four-year, $45 million contract. On January 6, 2016, Green hit two three-pointers against the Utah Jazz, giving him 662 with San Antonio to surpass Bruce Bowen (661) for second in franchise history.

On November 9, 2016, Green made his season debut for San Antonio, scoring eight points against the Houston Rockets in his return from a strained left quadriceps. At the season's end, he was named to the NBA All-Defensive Second Team.

On December 28, 2017, against the New York Knicks, Green became the 127th player in league history to reach 900 career three-pointers.

=== Toronto Raptors (2018–2019) ===
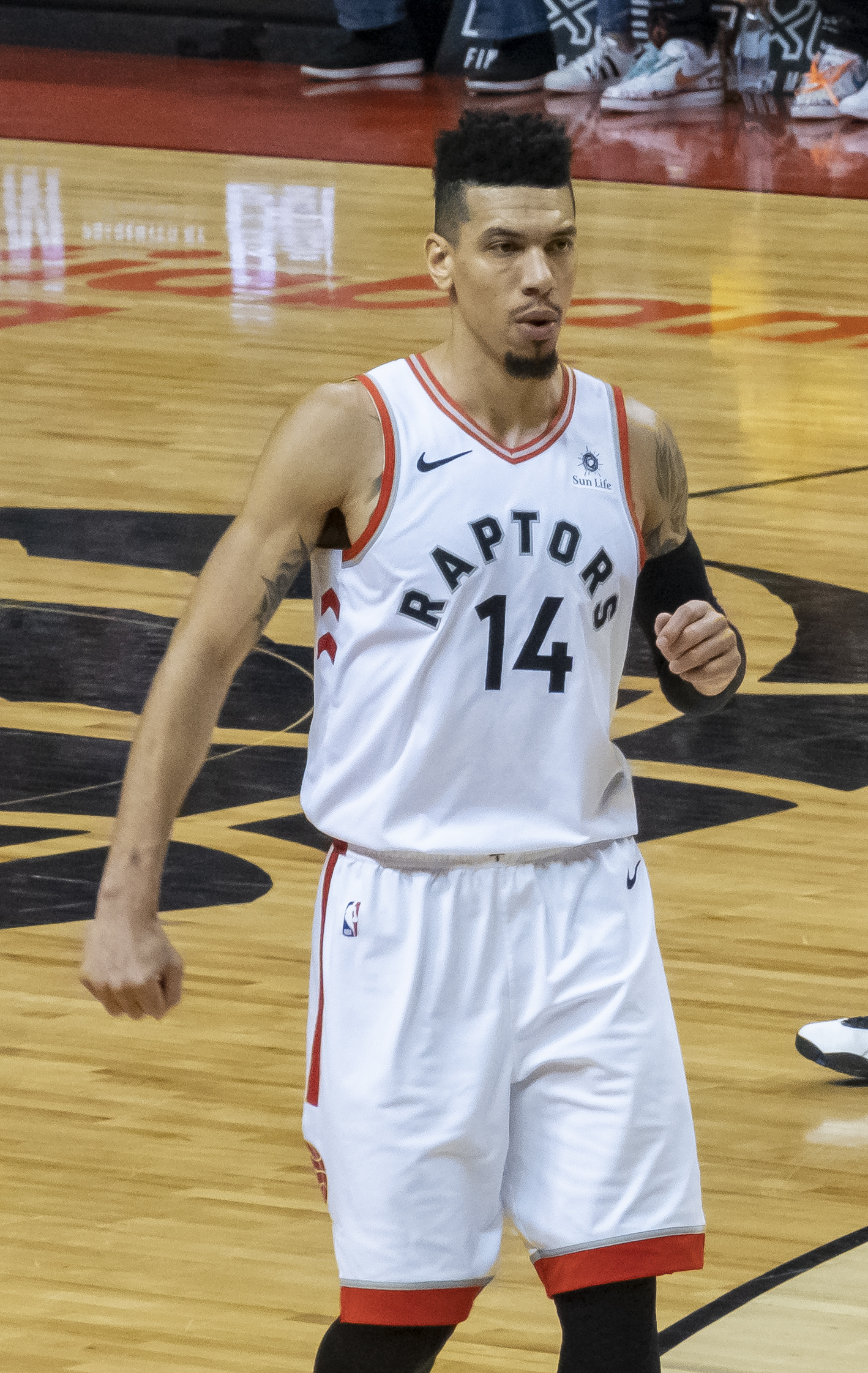
Green in 2019

On July 18, 2018, Green and teammate Kawhi Leonard were traded to the Toronto Raptors in exchange for DeMar DeRozan, Jakob Pöltl and a protected 2019 first round draft pick. On November 10, 2018, in a 128–112 win over the New York Knicks, Green reached 1,000 three-pointers for his career. On December 14, he had 19 points and 11 rebounds while matching his season high with five three-pointers in a 128–122 loss to the Portland Trail Blazers. On January 19, he had a season-high 24 points and set a franchise record for three-pointers in a quarter with seven in the third, as the Raptors beat the Memphis Grizzlies 119–90. With 21 points in the third, he fell one shy of Kyle Lowry's franchise record for a quarter. Green also matched a career high with eight threes for the game. On April 1, he scored a season-high 29 points in a 121–109 win over the Orlando Magic. Green helped the Raptors reach the 2019 NBA Finals, where they defeated the Golden State Warriors in six games, with Green earning his second NBA championship.

=== Los Angeles Lakers (2019–2020) ===
The Los Angeles Lakers signed Green to a two-year $30 million contract on July 6, 2019. He debuted for the Lakers on October 22, 2019, where he led the team with 28 points in 32 minutes on 10-of-14 field goal makes and 7-of-9 three-point makes in a 112–102 loss to the Los Angeles Clippers. His 28 points are the most points in a debut in franchise history, breaking Kareem Abdul-Jabbar's record of 27 points.

Green contributed to the Lakers finishing as the top seed in the Western Conference in a shortened season due to the COVID-19 pandemic that suspended the season for four months. The Lakers reached the 2020 NBA Finals, where they defeated the Miami Heat 4–2 to win the 2020 NBA championship. Green and teammate LeBron James became the third and fourth players in league history to win a championship with three different teams, joining John Salley and Robert Horry.

=== Philadelphia 76ers (2020–2022) ===
On November 18, 2020, Green, along with the draft rights to Jaden McDaniels, was traded to the Oklahoma City Thunder in exchange for Dennis Schröder. On December 8, Green, Terrance Ferguson and Vincent Poirier were traded to the Philadelphia 76ers for Al Horford, the draft rights of Théo Maledon and Vasilije Micić, and a 2025 first-round pick.

On August 7, 2021, Green re-signed with the 76ers on a two-year, $20 million contract. On May 12, 2022, during game 6 of the 76ers' second-round series against the Miami Heat, Green suffered a left knee injury in a 99–90 loss, due to a collision with his teammate Joel Embiid. The next day, he was diagnosed with a torn anterior cruciate ligament (ACL) and lateral collateral ligament (LCL) in his left knee.

=== Memphis Grizzlies (2022–2023) ===
During the 2022 NBA draft, Green, along with the draft rights to David Roddy, were traded to the Memphis Grizzlies in exchange for De'Anthony Melton. On February 1, 2023, Green made his Grizzlies debut, putting up three points in 10 minutes played in a 122–112 loss to the Portland Trail Blazers.

=== Return to Cleveland (2023) ===
On February 9, 2023, Green was traded to the Houston Rockets in a three-team trade involving the Los Angeles Clippers. He and the Rockets agreed to a contract buyout three days later, and he was subsequently waived.

On February 15, 2023, Green signed with the Cleveland Cavaliers. He made his Cavaliers debut the same day, scoring three points in a 118–112 loss to the Philadelphia 76ers.

=== Second stint with 76ers (2023) ===
On September 13, 2023, Green signed with the Philadelphia 76ers. On November 1, he was waived by the 76ers.

On October 10, 2024, Green announced his retirement from professional basketball.

== Career statistics ==
Legend
GP	Games played	GS	Games started	MPG	Minutes per game
FG%	Field goal percentage	3P%	3-point field goal percentage	FT%	Free throw percentage
RPG	Rebounds per game	APG	Assists per game	SPG	Steals per game
BPG	Blocks per game	PPG	Points per game	**Bold**	Career high
†	Won an NBA championship	*	Led the league

=== NBA ===
==== Regular season ====
Year	Team	GP	GS	MPG	FG%	3P%	FT%	RPG	APG	SPG	BPG	PPG
2009–10	Cleveland	20	0	5.8	.385	.273	.667	.9	.3	.3	.2	2.0
2010–11	San Antonio	8	0	11.5	.486	.368	—	1.9	.3	.3	.1	5.1
2011–12	San Antonio	66*	38	23.1	.442	.436	.790	3.5	1.3	.9	.7	9.1
2012–13	San Antonio	80	**80**	27.5	.448	.429	.848	3.1	1.8	1.2	.7	10.5
2013–14†	San Antonio	68	59	24.3	.432	.415	.794	3.4	1.5	1.0	.9	9.1
2014–15	San Antonio	**81**	**80**	**28.5**	.436	.418	.874	**4.2**	**2.0**	1.2	**1.1**	**11.7**
2015–16	San Antonio	79	79	26.1	.376	.332	.739	3.8	1.8	1.0	.8	7.2
2016–17	San Antonio	68	68	26.6	.392	.379	.844	3.3	1.8	1.0	.9	7.3
2017–18	San Antonio	70	60	25.6	.387	.363	.769	3.6	1.6	.9	**1.1**	8.6
2018–19†	Toronto	80	**80**	27.7	.465	**.455**	.841	4.0	1.6	.9	.7	10.3
2019–20†	L.A. Lakers	68	68	24.8	.416	.367	.688	3.3	1.3	**1.3**	.5	8.0
2020–21	Philadelphia	69	69	28.0	.412	.405	.775	3.8	1.7	**1.3**	.8	9.5
2021–22	Philadelphia	62	28	21.8	.394	.380	.786	2.5	1.0	1.0	.6	5.9
2022–23	Memphis	3	0	14.3	.273	.375	—	1.3	.7	.3	.0	3.0
2022–23	Cleveland	8	0	11.9	**.500**	.448	**1.000**	1.3	.5	.6	.4	6.5
2023–24	Philadelphia	2	0	9.2	.000	.000	—	1.0	.5	.5	.0	.0
Career		832	709	25.1	.421	.400	.805	3.4	1.5	1.0	.8	8.7

==== Playoffs ====
Year	Team	GP	GS	MPG	FG%	3P%	FT%	RPG	APG	SPG	BPG	PPG
2011	San Antonio	4	0	1.8	.333	.250	—	.3	.5	.3	.3	1.3
2012	San Antonio	14	12	20.6	.418	.345	.700	3.2	1.1	.5	.7	7.4
2013	San Antonio	21	21	**31.9**	.446	.482	.800	**4.1**	1.5	1.0	**1.1**	**11.1**
2014†	San Antonio	23	23	23.0	**.491**	.475	.818	3.0	.9	1.4	.7	9.3
2015	San Antonio	7	7	29.1	.344	.300	.667	3.1	2.1	1.0	1.0	8.3
2016	San Antonio	10	10	26.7	.462	**.500**	.667	3.1	.7	**2.1**	.8	8.6
2017	San Antonio	16	16	27.2	.405	.342	.571	3.6	1.4	.6	.9	7.8
2018	San Antonio	5	5	20.6	.267	.250	—	2.2	.2	.2	.8	4.2
2019†	Toronto	**24**	**24**	28.5	.342	.328	**.913**	3.6	1.1	1.3	.5	6.9
2020†	L.A. Lakers	21	21	25.0	.347	.339	.667	3.1	1.2	1.0	.8	8.0
2021	Philadelphia	8	8	24.9	.438	.378	—	2.6	**2.6**	1.1	1.0	7.0
2022	Philadelphia	12	12	26.6	.404	.408	.000	3.1	.8	1.0	.3	8.6
2023	Cleveland	4	0	9.9	.200	.250	—	1.8	.3	.5	.3	.8
Career		169	159	25.3	.404	.388	.745	3.2	1.2	1.0	.7	7.9

=== College ===
Year	Team	GP	GS	MPG	FG%	3P%	FT%	RPG	APG	SPG	BPG	PPG
2005–06	North Carolina	31	0	15.3	.433	.355	.792	3.7	1.1	.7	1.0	7.5
2006–07	North Carolina	37	0	13.6	.411	.296	.848	2.8	1.1	.6	.7	5.2
2007–08	North Carolina	**39**	1	22.3	.469	.373	**.873**	**4.9**	2.0	1.2	1.2	11.5
2008–09	North Carolina	38	**38**	**27.4**	**.471**	**.418**	.852	4.7	**2.7**	**1.8**	**1.3**	**13.1**
Career		145	39	19.9	.455	.375	.845	4.1	1.8	1.1	1.1	9.4

== Personal life ==
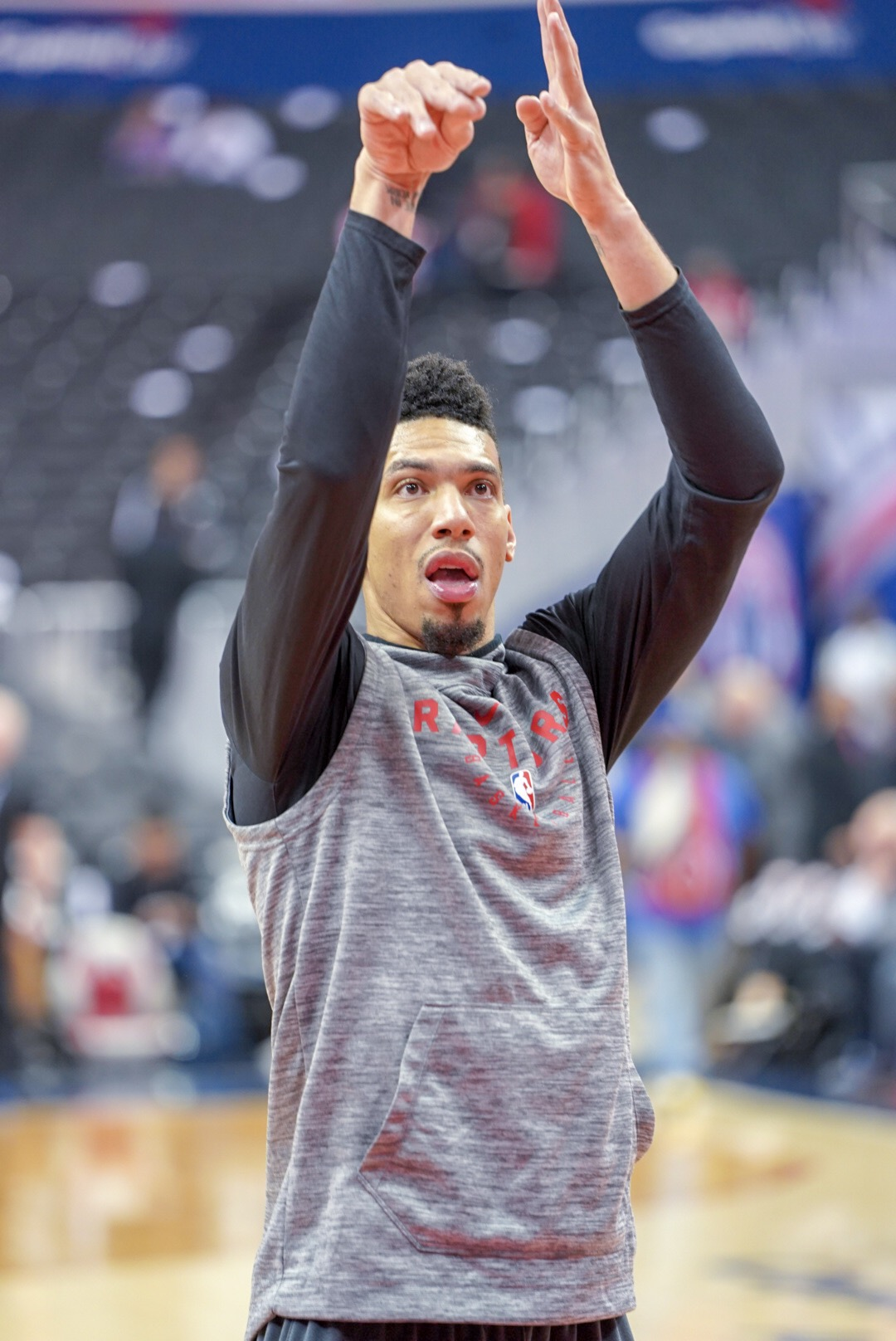
Green with the Toronto Raptors

=== Family ===
Green's brother, Rashad, played for Manhattan College in 2007–08 and the University of San Francisco from 2009 to 2012. His younger brother, Devonte Green, played for Indiana University. His second cousins are professional players Gerald Green and Garlon Green. A first cousin, Jordan Green, played for Texas A&M University. A third cousin, Willie Green, played for the University of Detroit Mercy and then in the NBA, and later became the head coach of New Orleans Pelicans. In 2020, Green got engaged to his longtime girlfriend, Blair Bashen. The two were married in 2021.

=== Podcast ===
In 2018, Green and longtime friend and sports broadcaster Harrison Sanford launched a podcast entitled "Inside the Green Room". While they intended to start with a soft launch in the summer of 2018, Green was traded to the Toronto Raptors just prior to recording what was to be the pilot episode, so they decided to do a full launch with the first episode. The podcast gained sponsorship from Yahoo Sports Canada. Episodes have featured players and coaches from the Toronto Raptors, as well as players from other teams and other sports journalists. Green has expressed an interest in moving into sports broadcasting after his playing career is over.

== See also ==
- List of NBA career 3-point scoring leaders
- List of NBA career playoff 3-point scoring leaders
