= 2005 McDonald's All-American Boys Game =

American high school basketball game

West	East
110	115
	1st half	2nd half	Total
West	43	67	110
East	65	50	115
- Date: March 30, 2005
- Venue: Joyce Center, South Bend, Indiana
- MVP: Josh McRoberts
- Referees: John Garcia; Arthur Prenell; Brad Roos; Chris Boehn
- Attendance: 7,660
- Network: ESPN

McDonald's All-American

The 2005 McDonald's All-American Boys Game was an All-star basketball game played on Wednesday, March 30, 2005, at the Joyce Center in South Bend, Indiana, home of the Fighting Irish of Notre Dame. The game's rosters featured the best and most highly recruited high school boys graduating in 2005. The game was the 28th annual version of the McDonald's All-American Game first played in 1978.

The 48 players were selected from 2,500 nominees by a committee of basketball experts. They were chosen not only for their on-court skills, but for their performances off the court as well. Coach Morgan Wootten, who had more than 1,200 wins as head basketball coach at DeMatha High School, was chairman of the selection committee. Legendary UCLA coach John Wooden, who has been involved in the McDonald's All American Games since its inception, served as chairman of the Games and as an advisor to the selection committee.

Proceeds from the 2005 McDonald's All American High School Basketball Games went to Ronald McDonald House Charities (RMHC) of South Bend and Fort Wayne, Indiana and their Ronald McDonald House programs.

== 2005 Game ==
The game was telecast live by ESPN. At first glance, the 2005 edition of the McDonald's All American boys team seemed to lack the "star power" of the 2003 and 2004 squads as they invaded Notre Dame's Joyce Center in March 2005. That perception was soon put to rest as seven players were taken in the 2005 NBA Draft.

Unlike most all-star events, the 2005 McDonald's Game was a close contest that brought much excitement to the Joyce Center. The East held a hefty lead most of the game and ended the first half with a 22-point lead thanks to high flying Gerald Green (former Dallas Maverick), who led all scorers with 24 points on 8-of-12 shooting. Greg Paulus had nine assists and 13 points, making 7-of-8 free throws in the final 2 minutes to help the East hang onto the 115–110 victory.

Other key contributors for the East included, shooting guards Louis Williams and Eric Devendorf (Syracuse), who recorded 14 and 13 points respectively.

The West team had several players who helped lead the charge from their 22-point deficit. Mario Chalmers (Miami Heat) led the West with a team high 20 points, five steals and five assists. Martell Webster (Portland Trail Blazers) started the game with two consecutive three-point baskets on his way to 16 points for the contest. Small forward Julian Wright (New Orleans Hornets) had a solid performance with 14 points, four assists and three rebounds.

=== West Roster ===
#	Name	Height	Weight	Position	Hometown	High school	College choice
00	Byron Eaton	5-11	200	G	Dallas, Texas	Lincoln High School	Oklahoma State
11	Monta Ellis	6-4	189	G	Jackson, Mississippi	Lanier High School	Mississippi State (Note: This individual never played at his chosen college, instead opting to enter the NBA draft.)
12	Amir Johnson	6-9	215	C	Westchester, California	Westchester High School	Louisville
15	Mario Chalmers	6-2	180	G	Anchorage, Alaska	Bartlett High School	Kansas
18	Luke Zeller	6-11	245	F	Washington, Indiana	Washington High School	Notre Dame
22	Micah Downs	6-8	192	F	Bothell, Washington	Juanita High School	Kansas (Note: Downs left Kansas midway through his first season of 2005–06 and transferred to Gonzaga. He left Gonzaga in 2009 for a professional career with one season of eligibility remaining.)
30	Julian Wright	6-9	215	F	Chicago Heights, Illinois	Homewood-Flossmoor High School	Kansas
32	Martell Webster	6-7	235	G	Edmonds, Washington	Seattle Preparatory School	Washington
34	Calvin Miles	6-6	207	F	Dallas, Texas	Skyline High School	Texas
40	Jon Brockman	6-8	245	F	Snohomish, Washington	Snohomish High School	Washington
42	Bobby Frasor	6-3	190	G	Blue Island, Illinois	Brother Rice High School	North Carolina
50	Tyler Hansbrough	6-9	250	F	Poplar Bluff, Missouri	Poplar Bluff High School	North Carolina

=== East Roster ===
#	Name	Height	Weight	Position	Hometown	High school	College choice
14	Danny Green	6-6	205	G	North Babylon, New York	St. Mary's High School	North Carolina
20	Greg Paulus	6-2	185	G	Manlius, New York	Christian Brothers Academy	Duke (Note: After completing his eligibility at Duke, Paulus transferred to Syracuse. Because he had received a bachelor's degree from Duke, he was allowed under NCAA rules to play one season at Syracuse in another sport, and started at quarterback for the Syracuse football team in 2009.)
22	Eric Devendorf	6-4	180	G	Bay City, Michigan	Oak Hill Academy	Syracuse
24	Louis Williams	6-3	185	G	Snellville, Georgia	South Gwinnett High School	Georgia (Note: This individual never played at his chosen college, instead opting to enter the NBA draft.)
25	Gerald Green	6-8	200	F	Houston, Texas	Gulf Shores Academy	Oklahoma State
32	Korvotney Barber	6-9	230	F	Manchester, Georgia	Manchester High School	Auburn
33	Andrew Bynum	7-0	300	C	Plainsboro Twp., New Jersey	St. Joseph High School	Connecticut
34	Brandon Costner	6-9	230	F	Montclair, New Jersey	Seton Hall Preparatory School	North Carolina State
35	Richard Hendrix	6-9	255	F	Athens, Alabama	Athens High School	Alabama
44	Josh McRoberts	6-10	235	F	Carmel, Indiana	Carmel High School	Duke
50	Tasmin Mitchell	6-8	235	F	Denham Springs, Louisiana	Denham Springs High School	LSU
52	Eric Boateng	6-10	240	C	London, England	St. Andrew's School	Duke

=== Coaches ===
The West team was coached by:

- Head Coach Al Rhodes of Logansport North High School (Logansport, Indiana)
- Asst Coach Pete Smith of Guerin Catholic High School (Noblesville, Indiana)

The East team was coached by:

- Head Coach Jack Keefer of Lawrence North High School (Indianapolis, Indiana)
- Asst Coach Ralph Scott of Lawrence North High School (Indianapolis, Indiana)

=== Boxscore ===
==== Visitors: West ====
##	Player	FGM/A	3PM/A	FTM/A	Points	Off Reb	Def Reb	Tot Reb	PF	Ast	TO	BS	ST	Min
11	*Monta Ellis	3/10	1/ 5	1/ 3	8	1	2	3	4	2	1	0	2	17
18	*Luke Zeller	0/ 2	0/ 0	0/ 0	0	1	1	2	1	2	1	0	1	15
32	*Martell Webster	6/15	2/ 7	2/ 2	16	3	3	6	1	0	0	2	2	23
42	*Bobby Frasor	0/ 4	0/ 2	2/ 4	2	0	1	1	1	0	1	0	0	14
50	*Tyler Hansbrough	4/ 7	1/ 1	6/ 6	15	6	2	8	2	0	0	0	0	21
00	Byron Eaton	2/ 3	1/ 2	2/ 8	7	0	1	1	2	3	0	0	2	13
12	Amir Johnson	0/ 5	0/ 0	1/ 2	1	2	5	7	4	2	1	2	1	19
15	Mario Chalmers	8/16	3/ 9	1/ 3	20	1	3	4	1	5	3	0	5	19
22	Micah Downs	3/ 5	2/ 3	0/ 0	8	0	2	2	2	1	1	0	0	11
30	Julian Wright	7/ 9	0/ 1	0/ 1	14	2	1	3	3	4	1	0	2	17
34	Calvin Miles	5/10	3/ 5	0/ 0	13	0	3	3	3	2	3	1	0	13
40	Jon Brockman	3/ 6	0/ 0	0/ 0	6	5	2	7	3	0	1	0	2	18
	Team					1	2	3						
	TOTALS	41/92	13/35	15/29	110	22	28	50	27	21	13	5	17	200

==== Home: East ====
##	Player	FGM/A	3PM/A	FTM/A	Points	Off Reb	Def Reb	Tot Reb	PF	Ast	TO	BS	ST	Min
14	*Danny Green	2/ 6	1/ 2	2/ 2	7	1	3	4	3	2	4	1	1	18
20	*Greg Paulus	2/ 6	0/ 2	9/10	13	0	1	1	3	9	1	0	0	24
24	*Lou Williams	5/10	1/ 3	3/ 3	14	1	2	3	1	11	3	0	1	20
35	*Richard Hendrix	2/ 3	0/ 0	2/ 4	6	1	3	4	1	0	0	2	0	14
44	*Josh McRoberts	7/ 8	2/ 3	1/ 3	17	3	9	12	0	1	4	0	1	24
22	Eric Devendorf	7/ 9	1/ 2	4/ 6	21	2	0	2	1	13	4	0	0	18
25	Gerald Green	8/12	6/ 9	2/ 3	24	0	1	1	5	0	1	0	1	20
32	Korvotney Barber	0/ 0	0/ 0	4/ 6	4	1	0	1	2	0	1	0	0	10
33	Andrew Bynum	3/ 5	0/ 0	3/ 3	9	2	3	5	3	0	0	1	0	11
34	Brandon Costner	1/ 8	0/ 4	0/ 0	2	3	4	7	1	3	4	0	1	18
50	Tasmin Mitchell	3/ 5	0/ 0	0/ 2	6	0	1	1	3	0	0	0	0	13
52	Eric Boateng	0/ 0	0/ 0	0/ 0	0	0	6	6	1	1	2	0	0	10
	Team					2	3	5						
	TOTALS	37/72	11/25	30/42	115	16	36	52	24	20	24	4	5	200

(* = Starting Line-up)

== All-American Week ==
=== Schedule ===
- Tuesday, March 29: Powerade Jamfest
  - Slam Dunk Contest
  - Three-Point Shoot-out
  - Timed Basketball Skills Competition
- Wednesday, March 30: 28th Annual Boys All-American Game

The Powerade JamFest is a skills-competition evening featuring basketball players who demonstrate their skills in three crowd-entertaining ways. The slam dunk contest was first held in 1987, and a 3-point shooting challenge was added in 1989. This year, for the first time, a timed basketball skills competition was added to the schedule of events.

=== Contest Winners ===
- The 2005 Powerade Slam Dunk contest was won by Gerald Green.
- Mario Chalmers was winner of the 2005 3-point shoot-out.
- The skills competition was won by Richard Hendrix

== See also ==
- 2005 McDonald's All-American Girls Game
