= Brother Rice High School =

Brother Rice High School may refer to:

- Brother Rice High School (Chicago)
- Brother Rice High School (Michigan)
