= Brother Rice =

Brother Rice can refer to:

- Brother Rice High School in Bloomfield Hills, Michigan
- Brother Rice High School in Chicago, Illinois
- Edmund Ignatius Rice, the Irish missionary after which both of these schools are named.
