= Kingery =

Kingery is a surname. It may refer to:

== Persons ==
- Gayle Kingery (born 1939), American politician, teacher
- Mike Kingery (born 1961), American baseball player
- Paul Kingery, band member of Three Dog Night
- Scott Kingery (born 1994), American Major League Baseball player
- W. David Kingery (1926–2000), American material scientist
- Wayne Kingery (1927–2016), American football halfback and defensive back

== Others ==
- Kingery Expressway, formerly called the Tri-State Highway, a freeway in Illinois, USA
