= Eddie Moss =

American football player (born 1948)

No. 27, 36
- Position: Running back

Personal information
- Born: September 27, 1948 (age 78); Dell, Arkansas, U.S.
- Listed height: 6 ft 0 in (1.83 m)
- Listed weight: 215 lb (98 kg)

Career information
- High school: Poplar Bluff (MO)
- College: Southeast Missouri State
- NFL draft: 1972: 13th round, 313th overall pick

Career history
- St. Louis Cardinals (1973–1976); Washington Redskins (1977)

Career NFL statistics
- Rushing attempts: 22
- Rushing yards: 66
- Rushing TDs: 1
- Stats at Pro Football Reference

Eddie B. Moss (born September 27, 1948) is an American former professional football player who was a running back in the National Football League (NFL) for the St. Louis Cardinals and the Washington Redskins. He played college football for the Southeast Missouri State Redhawks and was selected by the Buffalo Bills in the 13th round of the 1972 NFL draft.

== High school and college years ==
Moss was a 1967 graduate of Poplar Bluff High School where he starred on both sides of the ball. He was named all-conference at linebacker and running back his senior season on a team that finished with a 9–0 record. After high school, Moss played two seasons for Centerville Community College in Iowa and then transferred to Southeast Missouri State, in Cape Girardeau. At SEMO, he led the team in rushing his junior and senior years and combined to score 16 touchdowns.

== Pro career ==
Moss was selected by the Buffalo Bills in the 13th round of the 1972 NFL draft but failed to make the team. He signed with the Cardinals in 1973 where he played four seasons, primarily on special teams and blocking for Terry Metcalf. The Cardinals won two NFC East division titles during his stay in St. Louis. He spent the final two years of his career in Washington before retiring after the 1978 season.

== Post career ==
After retirement, Moss spent 27 years with the United Parcel Service and was inducted into the Missouri Sports Hall of Fame in 2016.

== Personal life ==
He is the brother of former CFL running back, Leroy Moss.
