= Leroy Moss =

Canadian football player (born 1951)

Profile
- Position: Running back

Personal information
- Born: March 27, 1951 (age 75)
- Listed height: 5 ft 8 in (1.73 m)
- Listed weight: 195 lb (88 kg)

Career information
- College: Missouri

Career history
- 1974–1975: Edmonton Eskimos
- 1977: BC Lions

Awards and highlights
- Grey Cup champion (1975)

Leroy Moss (born March 27, 1951) is a retired Canadian football player who played for the Edmonton Eskimos and BC Lions. He won the Grey Cup with Edmonton in 1975. He played college football at the University of Missouri from 1972 to 1973.

He is the brother of former NFL running back, Eddie Moss.
