= Eric Boateng =

British basketball player (born 1985)

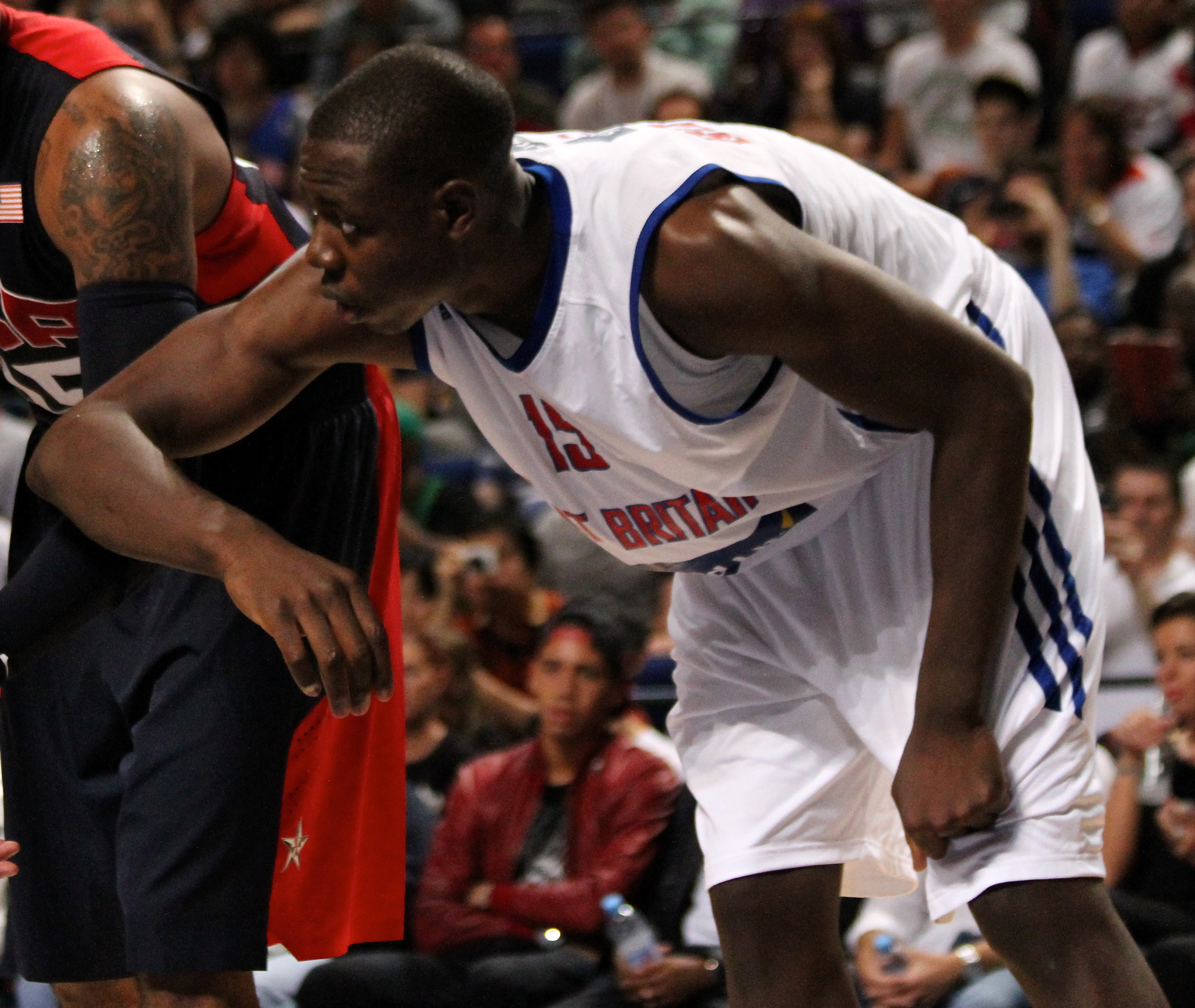
- Boateng playing for Great Britain in 2012

Personal information
- Born: 20 November 1985 (age 40) London, England
- Listed height: 6 ft 10 in (2.08 m)
- Listed weight: 257 lb (117 kg)

Career information
- High school: St. Andrew's School (Middletown, Delaware)
- College: Duke (2005–2006); Arizona State (2007–2010)
- NBA draft: 2010: undrafted
- Playing career: 2010–2019
- Position: Center

Career history
- 2010–2011: Idaho Stampede
- 2011: Austin Toros
- 2011–2012: Peristeri
- 2012–2013: Phantoms Braunschweig
- 2013: La Unión
- 2014: Élan Béarnais Pau-Orthez
- 2014–2015: FC Mulhouse
- 2015–2017: ADA Blois
- 2017–2019: SVBD

Career highlights
- Fourth-team Parade All-American (2005); McDonald's All-American (2005)
- Stats at Basketball Reference

Eric Yamoah Boateng (born 20 November 1985) is a British former professional basketball player. He is a former college basketball player with the Arizona State Sun Devils men's basketball team. He attended high school at St. Andrew's School in Middletown, Delaware. Boateng committed to Duke University out of high school, but transferred after one season to Arizona State. He is also a member of the senior men's Great Britain national basketball team. In November 2014, he was elected to a four-year term on the British Olympic Association's Athletes' Commission. He was reelected to the Commission in November 2018.

== High school career ==
Eric Boateng attended Ernest Bevin College in Tooting, South London, between 1997 and 2002, he later attended high school at St. Andrew's School in Middletown, Delaware, where he averaged 19.6 points, 13.6 rebounds and 4.6 blocked shots a game. Boateng was named Delaware high school player of the year by the Delaware Sportswriters & Broadcasters Association, and earned national recognition that included Gatorade State Player of the Year, 4th Team, and garnering the ranking of the 3rd best center for the 2005 recruiting class, behind only Andrew Bynum and Amir Johnson.

Boateng received scholarship offers from Boston College, Georgetown, Michigan, UCLA, Villanova, and Duke. He eventually committed to attend Duke.

=== McDonald's All American Game ===
After his high school career, Boateng was added to the 2005 McDonald's All-American Boys Game roster. Boateng played for the East squad, for whom he grabbed 6 rebounds, and had an assist, in 10 minutes.

== College career ==
Boateng played four years of NCAA's Division I basketball between 2005 and 2010. After spending his first year at Duke, Boateng transferred to Arizona State. Due to NCAA rules, Boateng was forced to sit out a year before playing his final 3 seasons. As a senior, Boateng scored a career-high 24 points on 11-of-11 shooting against Stanford on 25 February 2010, tying school and Pac-10 records for highest field-goal percentage in a conference game, minimum of 10 shots taken. Boateng added six rebounds and three assists.

"He wouldn't let us lose," ASU coach Herb Sendek said. "I'm so happy for him, because he's had an uphill climb to be in this place, to enjoy this moment."

=== College statistics ===
Season Averages
Season	Team	G	PTS	REB	AST	STL	BLK	FG%	3P%	FT%	MIN	TO
2005–06	Duke Blue Devils	20	.7	.6	.1	.1	0	.857	.000	1.0	2.5	.3
2006–07	Arizona State Sun Devils	Did not play (transfer rules)										
2007–08	Arizona State Sun Devils	34	3.9	2.6	.2	.1	.3	.615	.000	.365	1.6	1.2
2008–09	Arizona State Sun Devils	31	1.8	2	.2	.2	.2	.615	.000	.409	8.2	.3
2009–10	Arizona State Sun Devils	33	8.8	7.2	.9	.6	.8	.665	.000	.542	27.1	2.1
Totals:		29.5	3.8	3.1	.35	.25	.325	.688	.000	.579	12.35	.975

== Professional career ==
After going undrafted in the 2010 NBA draft, Boateng joined the New York Knicks for the 2010 NBA Summer League, where he averaged 3.6 points per game and 3.2 rebounds per game. His performances impressed the Denver Nuggets, who signed him to play in their pre-season squad. Through 5 games with the Nuggets, Boateng averaged 1.6 points per game and 4.2 rebounds per game, including a career high 10 rebounds in a win against the Los Angeles Clippers. He was the last player cut by the Nuggets before the start of the 2010–11 NBA season.

Boateng was selected by the Idaho Stampede in the 2010 NBA D-League draft. On 2 February 2011, Boateng was traded to the Austin Toros, in a three team trade. He made his debut for the team on 3 February, playing 11 minutes against the Fort Wayne Mad Ants.

In November 2011, Boateng signed with the Greek Basket League team Peristeri. Boateng was sidelined in January 2012 with a calf injury.

In 2012, he joined Phantoms Braunschweig of the BBL for the 2012–13 season.

On 25 September 2013, Boateng signed with the Los Angeles Lakers. However, he was waived on 9 October.

In late October 2013, he joined La Unión (Formosa) of the LNB.

On 21 June 2015, he signed to play with ADA Blois Basket 41 in Blois.

In August 2017, Boateng signed with Saint-Vallier Basket Drôme of the NM1 (French third division).

== International career ==
Boateng made his debut for Great Britain against Finland in 2006, maintaining his place in the squad ever since. Boateng began 2011 in great form, winning the MVP of the tri-test series with the Netherlands and Nigeria. He followed this up with some solid performances in the London Prepares Olympic test event, averaging almost 6 points per game against world class opposition. Boateng was then selected to be part of the British national team that competed in the 2011 EuroBasket championship in Lithuania. His best game came at EuroBasket 2011 was a career-high 7 rebounds and 4 points, in 25 minutes against Turkey.
