= Bobby Frasor =

American basketball player (born 1986)

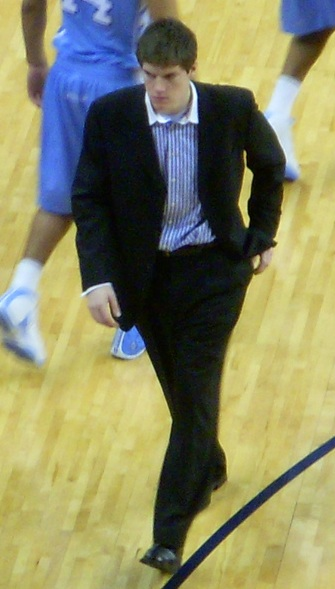

Personal information
- Born: October 31, 1986 (age 40) Blue Island, Illinois, U.S.
- Listed height: 6 ft 4 in (1.93 m)
- Listed weight: 209 lb (95 kg)

Career information
- High school: Brother Rice (Chicago, Illinois)
- College: North Carolina (2005–2009)
- NBA draft: 2009: undrafted
- Playing career: 2009–2011
- Position: Point guard / shooting guard
- Number: 4

Career history

Playing
- 2009–2010: BC Levski Sofia
- 2010–2011: Achilleas

Coaching
- 2011–2012: North Carolina (video coordinator)
- 2012–2014: UAB (director of operations)
- 2015–2022: Brother Rice HS

Career highlights
- NCAA champion (2009); ACC All-Freshman Team (2006); Fourth-team Parade All-American (2005); McDonald's All-American (2005)

Robert John Frasor (born October 31, 1986) is an American former professional basketball player and former college and high school coach. He was born in Blue Island, Illinois to Bob and Donna Frasor. His father won 298 games in 27 years as head basketball coach at Eisenhower High School. Bobby Frasor played at North Carolina from 2005 to 2009 as both point guard and shooting guard.

== High school career ==
Frasor attended Brother Rice High School from 2001 to 2005, and was coached by Pat Richardson. Throughout those years, Frasor was a success both on the basketball court and in the classroom. Academically, Frasor was a member of the National Honor Society and a four-year member of the "high honors," which means he averaged a 3.9 or higher grade point average (GPA). On the basketball court, Frasor began to stand out as a junior when he averaged twelve points and five assists on a team that finished the season 26–2. The following year, Frasor's senior season, he averaged 21 points, five rebounds and seven assists along with being named the Chicago Catholic League Player of the Year. In his total time at Brother Rice, he earned all conference honors three times and earned all-state honors twice. Before making the bridge from his high school career to his college career at the University of North Carolina at Chapel Hill, Frasor earned McDonald's All-American honors along with EA Sports All-American honors.

== Collegiate career ==
=== Freshman season ===
Frasor averaged 27.5 minutes, 6.4 points, 2.2 rebounds, and 4.4 assists to end his freshman season. He started all 31 games at point guard. His season high in scoring took place against North Carolina State as he put up 17 points, and his season-high twelve assists took place against Saint Louis. He was fourth in the Atlantic Coast Conference (ACC) in assists and also fourth in the ACC in assist-to-error ratio. With these numbers, he, along with teammate Tyler Hansbrough, were members of the 2006 ACC All-freshman team.

=== Sophomore season ===
Frasor completed his sophomore season averaging 10.1 minutes, 2.4 points, 0.7 rebounds, 1.6 assists, and 0.8 turnovers per game. He played in 28 games as a sophomore however his playing time significantly decreased after returning from multiple foot injuries. He missed ten games in two different stretches due to an injured right foot and later in the season missed six games for a sore right foot and bruised hip.

=== Junior season ===
Although embattled by more injuries, Frasor ended his junior campaign averaging 16.3 minutes, 3.2 points, 1.8 rebounds, 2.1 assists, and 0.8 turnovers. While only playing in twelve games, he saw action at both shooting guard and point guard and also earned defensive player of the game eight of his twelve games. However, during the second half of the Nevada game on December 27, 2007, Frasor tore his left anterior cruciate ligament (ACL) while going for a steal. He then was forced to go through reconstructive surgery on January 14, 2008, and missed the remainder of his junior season. Despite suffering from a season-ending injury, Frasor was still able to win the team's scholar-athlete award for the 2007–08 season. He was cleared by doctors to play in early July to begin preparing for his senior season.

=== Senior season ===
In a season ending with victory in the NCAA Men's Division I Basketball Championship, Frasor completed the season averaging 17.4 minutes, 2.6 points, 2.0 rebounds, 1.4 assists, and 0.7 turnovers. He went undrafted in the 2009 NBA draft.

== Professional career ==
Following the completion of his college career, Frasor joined BC Levski Sofia, which plays in the Balkan League and Bulgarian National League, which went on to win the basketball Bulgarian Cup. For the 2010–11 season, Frasor signed with Cypriot team Achilleas Kaimakliou.

== Coaching career ==
In 2011, Frasor retired from basketball and joined Roy Williams' staff as assistant video coordinator. In 2012, he was hired by the University of Alabama at Birmingham head basketball coach Jerod Haase as the director of operations with the goal being to groom him to be a Division I coach. He coached for seven years at his alma mater, Brother Rice High School. Frasor won two regional titles in two of his first three seasons and compiled an overall record of 143-56 in seven seasons. The Crusaders won a pair of Catholic League championships under Frasor.
