= C. J. Miles =

American basketball player (born 1987)

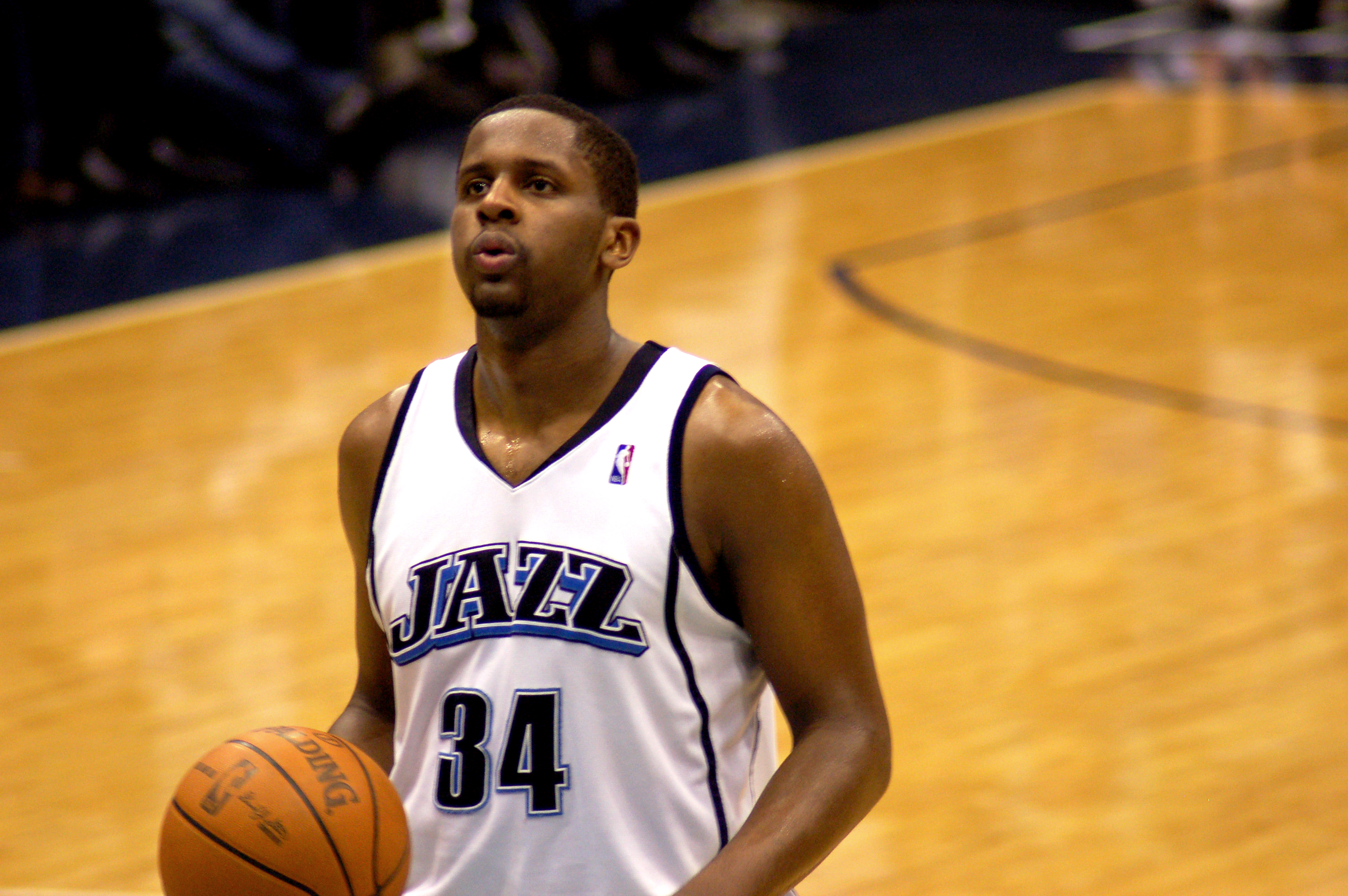
- Miles with the Utah Jazz in 2010

Personal information
- Born: March 18, 1987 (age 39) Dallas, Texas, U.S.
- Listed height: 6 ft 6 in (1.98 m)
- Listed weight: 220 lb (100 kg)

Career information
- High school: Skyline (Dallas, Texas)
- NBA draft: 2005: 2nd round, 34th overall pick
- Drafted by: Utah Jazz
- Playing career: 2005–2022
- Position: Small forward / shooting guard
- Number: 34, 0, 6, 50

Career history
- 2005–2012: Utah Jazz
- 2006: →Albuquerque Thunderbirds
- 2007: →Idaho Stampede
- 2012–2014: Cleveland Cavaliers
- 2014–2017: Indiana Pacers
- 2017–2019: Toronto Raptors
- 2019: Memphis Grizzlies
- 2019–2020: Washington Wizards
- 2021: NBA G League Ignite
- 2021: Boston Celtics
- 2022: NBA G League Ignite

Career highlights
- First-team Parade All-American (2005); McDonald's All-American (2005); Texas Mr. Basketball (2005)

Career NBA statistics
- Points: 8,108 (9.6 ppg)
- Rebounds: 2,011 (2.4 rpg)
- Assists: 914 (1.1 apg)
- Stats at NBA.com
- Stats at Basketball Reference

Calvin Andre "C. J." Miles Jr. (born March 18, 1987) is an American former professional basketball player who played in the National Basketball Association (NBA). A native of Dallas, Miles was drafted in 2005 by the Utah Jazz after finishing high school.

== High school career ==
Miles attended Skyline High School for Architecture in Dallas, where he was named to the Parade All-American First Team. He averaged 23.2 points, 11.2 rebounds and 3.3 assists as a junior and 23.5 points, 10.0 rebounds and 4.8 assists as a senior.

Miles led Skyline to the Class 5A Region II quarterfinals as a senior and was named All-Dallas Area Player of the Year by The Dallas Morning News. He was also named a 2005 McDonald's High School All-American. He was listed as the 19th best senior prospect by Rivals.com and ranked the 10th best senior in the country by Scout.com.

Skyline retired his No. 34 jersey making him only the second player in school history to receive the honor, joining former NBA star Larry Johnson.

He capped off his high school career by scoring 13 points in the McDonald's High School All-America Game and 16 points in the Michael Jordan Classic.

== Professional career ==
=== Utah Jazz (2005–2012) ===
Miles committed to the University of Texas at Austin, stating that if he was not selected in the first round of the NBA draft he would play for the Longhorns. He was drafted by the Utah Jazz in the 2nd round, with the 34th pick of the 2005 NBA draft but decided to forego college when the Jazz offered a two-year guaranteed contract equivalent to that of a late first round selection. At age 18, he became the youngest player in Jazz franchise history.

During the 2005–06 season, the Jazz assigned Miles to the Albuquerque Thunderbirds of the NBA Development League (D-League) in order for him to attain more experience.

After playing 21 games during the 2006–07 NBA season, he was again assigned by the Jazz to the D-League, this time to the Idaho Stampede.

Miles is known as the subject of one of the most memorable post-game interviews of the 2006–07 NBA season, where coach Jerry Sloan stated, "I don't care if he's 19 or 30. If he's going to be on the floor in the NBA, he's got to be able to step up and get after it. We can't put diapers on him one night, and a jockstrap the next night. It's just the way it is." Miles at the time was the youngest player on the Jazz roster.

On July 18, 2008, Miles signed a 4-year, 14.8 million offer sheet with the Oklahoma City Thunder. Since he was a restricted free agent, the Jazz had seven days to decide to match the offer or not. They matched the deal on July 25, making Miles stay in Utah. At the start of the 2010-2011 NBA season, Miles was assigned the role of the Jazz's sixth man. On November 20, 2010, set a career high in three-point field goals made with 7. On March 16, 2011, Miles recorded a career-high 40 points against the Minnesota Timberwolves.

=== Cleveland Cavaliers (2012–2014) ===
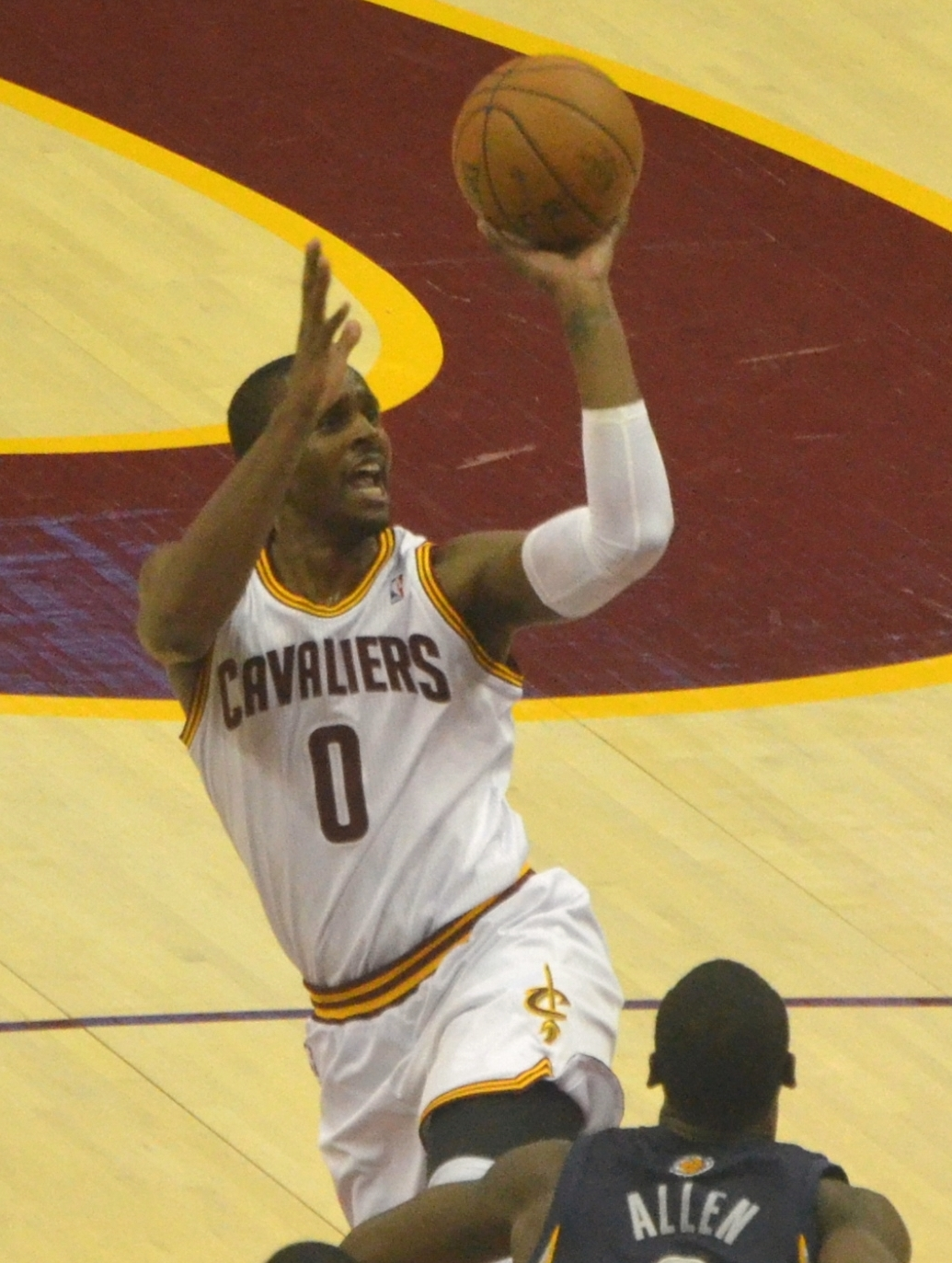
Miles with the Cavaliers in March 2013

On August 8, 2012, Miles signed with the Cleveland Cavaliers. On January 7, 2014, Miles recorded a Cavaliers franchise-high 10 three-pointers in a 111–93 victory over the Philadelphia 76ers.

=== Indiana Pacers (2014–2017) ===
On July 11, 2014, Miles signed a four-year, $18 million contract with the Indiana Pacers. On November 24, 2015, he had his best game as a Pacer, scoring 32 points on 10-of-16 shooting in a 123–106 win over the Washington Wizards.

=== Toronto Raptors (2017–2019) ===
On July 18, 2017, Miles signed a three-year, $25 million contract with the Toronto Raptors. In his debut for the Raptors in their season opener on October 19, 2017, Miles scored 22 points in a 117–100 win over the Chicago Bulls. He went 6 for 9 from 3-point range and had five rebounds.

=== Memphis Grizzlies (2019) ===
On February 7, 2019, Miles was traded, along with Jonas Valančiūnas, Delon Wright and a 2024 second-round draft pick, to the Memphis Grizzlies in exchange for Marc Gasol.

=== Washington Wizards (2019–2020) ===
On July 6, 2019, Miles was traded to the Washington Wizards in exchange for Dwight Howard. On December 4, 2019, the Wizards announced that Miles had undergone successful surgery to repair ligament damage in his left wrist and would be sidelined. On January 12, 2020, Miles was waived by the Washington Wizards.

=== NBA G League Ignite (2021) ===
On December 17, 2021, Miles signed with the NBA G League Ignite, playing that night.

=== Boston Celtics (2021) ===
On December 20, 2021, Miles signed a 10-day contract with the Boston Celtics.

=== Return to the Ignite (2022) ===
On January 20, 2022, Miles re-joined the NBA G League Ignite.

== NBA career statistics ==
Legend
| GP | Games played | GS | Games started | MPG | Minutes per game |
| FG% | Field goal percentage | 3P% | 3-point field goal percentage | FT% | Free throw percentage |
| RPG | Rebounds per game | APG | Assists per game | SPG | Steals per game |
| BPG | Blocks per game | PPG | Points per game | **Bold** | Career high |

=== Regular season ===
| Year | Team | GP | GS | MPG | FG% | 3P% | FT% | RPG | APG | SPG | BPG | PPG |
|---|---|---|---|---|---|---|---|---|---|---|---|---|
| 2005–06 | Utah | 23 | 0 | 8.8 | .368 | .250 | .750 | 1.7 | .7 | .3 | .1 | 3.4 |
| 2006–07 | Utah | 37 | 13 | 10.1 | .345 | .219 | .609 | .9 | .7 | .3 | .1 | 2.7 |
| 2007–08 | Utah | 60 | 13 | 11.5 | **.479** | .390 | .788 | 1.3 | .9 | .5 | .1 | 5.0 |
| 2008–09 | Utah | 72 | **72** | 22.5 | .459 | .352 | .876 | 2.3 | 1.5 | .6 | .2 | 9.1 |
| 2009–10 | Utah | 63 | 28 | 23.8 | .429 | .341 | .695 | 2.7 | **1.7** | .9 | .3 | 9.9 |
| 2010–11 | Utah | **78** | 19 | 25.2 | .407 | .322 | .811 | **3.3** | **1.7** | .9 | **.5** | 12.8 |
| 2011–12 | Utah | 56 | 14 | 20.4 | .381 | .307 | .794 | 2.1 | 1.2 | .8 | .3 | 9.1 |
| 2012–13 | Cleveland | 65 | 13 | 21.0 | .415 | .384 | .869 | 2.7 | 1.0 | .8 | .3 | 11.2 |
| 2013–14 | Cleveland | 51 | 34 | 19.3 | .435 | .393 | .853 | 2.0 | 1.0 | .9 | .3 | 9.9 |
| 2014–15 | Indiana | 70 | 40 | **26.3** | .398 | .345 | .807 | 3.1 | 1.1 | .9 | .4 | **13.5** |
| 2015–16 | Indiana | 64 | 24 | 22.9 | .409 | .367 | .750 | 2.7 | 1.0 | .8 | **.5** | 11.8 |
| 2016–17 | Indiana | 76 | 29 | 23.4 | .434 | **.413** | .903 | 3.0 | .6 | .6 | .3 | 10.7 |
| 2017–18 | Toronto | 70 | 3 | 19.1 | .379 | .361 | .835 | 2.2 | .8 | .5 | .3 | 10.0 |
| 2018–19 | Toronto | 40 | 1 | 14.1 | .340 | .314 | .795 | 1.7 | .6 | .5 | .3 | 5.5 |
| 2018–19 | Memphis | 13 | 0 | 22.6 | .400 | .364 | **.929** | 2.1 | 1.1 | .6 | .4 | 9.3 |
| 2019–20 | Washington | 10 | 0 | 16.1 | .322 | .314 | .750 | 1.2 | 1.2 | **1.0** | .4 | 6.4 |
| 2021–22 | Boston | 1 | 0 | 2.0 | — | — | — | .0 | .0 | .0 | .0 | .0 |
| Career | | 849 | 303 | 20.4 | .411 | .358 | .809 | 2.4 | 1.1 | .7 | .3 | 9.6 |

=== Playoffs ===
| Year | Team | GP | GS | MPG | FG% | 3P% | FT% | RPG | APG | SPG | BPG | PPG |
|---|---|---|---|---|---|---|---|---|---|---|---|---|
| 2007 | Utah | 1 | 0 | 3.0 | .000 | .000 | .500 | .0 | .0 | .0 | .0 | 1.0 |
| 2008 | Utah | 7 | 0 | 3.7 | .357 | .250 | .000 | .7 | .0 | .3 | .0 | 1.7 |
| 2009 | Utah | 5 | 0 | 11.6 | .300 | .250 | .750 | 1.4 | .2 | .4 | .2 | 3.4 |
| 2010 | Utah | **10** | **10** | **33.7** | .443 | .326 | .897 | 2.5 | **2.8** | .6 | **.6** | **14.4** |
| 2016 | Indiana | 7 | 0 | 13.1 | .263 | .100 | .667 | **3.4** | .6 | .1 | .1 | 3.4 |
| 2017 | Indiana | 4 | 2 | 20.5 | **.458** | .313 | **1.000** | 2.0 | .3 | .5 | .3 | 7.3 |
| 2018 | Toronto | 10 | 1 | 22.7 | .451 | **.422** | .813 | 2.4 | .8 | **.7** | .3 | 9.6 |
| Career | | 44 | 13 | 18.8 | .407 | .315 | .848 | 2.1 | 1.0 | .5 | .3 | 7.3 |

== Personal life ==
In 2010, Miles began dating Lauren Smith while she was playing college basketball as a senior at Texas A&M University–Corpus Christi. The couple got engaged in 2015 and married in 2016. His wife gave birth to a girl on November 23, 2017.

On July 3, 2020, Miles and his wife gave birth to another baby girl amid the COVID-19 Pandemic. Their third child, a boy, was born in June 2023.

In October 2022, Miles and Amit Mann started a Toronto Raptors-based podcast, titled Strictly Hoops. The podcast is made in partnership with Yahoo! Sports Canada.
