= Gayle Kingery =

American politician (born 1939)

Member of the Missouri House of Representatives from the 154th district
- In office 2003–2011
- Succeeded by: Todd Richardson

Personal details
- Born: July 21, 1939 (age 87) Harviell, Missouri
- Party: Republican
- Spouse: Bette
- Children: 5
- Education: Southeast Missouri State University (BS)
- Occupation: Teacher

Gayle Kingery (born July 21, 1939) is an American former teacher, and former Republican member of the Missouri House of Representatives. He represented the 154th district, which includes part of Butler County, from 2003 to 2011. He was also a candidate for the Republican nomination for Missouri's 25th district in the state senate until he dropped out of the race in June 2011.

== Early life and career ==
Gayle Kingery was born in Harviell in 1939. He graduated from Poplar Bluff Senior High School in 1957. He was in the U.S. Air Force from 1961 to 1965. He then received a B.S. in education from Southeast Missouri State University. He was then a teacher and coach in Jackson, Missouri for three years and then a teacher, coach, and administrator in Poplar Bluff, Missouri for thirty years. Kingery is a member of the First United Methodist Church in Poplar Bluff. He is married with five kids.

== Political career ==
Gayle Kingery was first elected to the Missouri House of Representatives in 2002. He won the Republican nomination against Robert L. Myers and the general election against Democrat Bill Stanberry and Libertarian Chip Taylor. In 2004, Kingery won reelection unopposed. In 2006, he won reelection against Democrat Nancy Lou Norman. In 2008, he won reelection against Libertarian Larry S. Busby. In 2010, Kingery was ineligible to run for reelection due to term limits. In 2011, Gayle Kingery decided to run for the 25th district in the Missouri Senate. It was an open seat because Rob Mayer is unable to run for reelection due to term limits. He dropped out of the race in June 2011, citing a need to spend more time with his family.

== Electoral history ==
2008 General Election for Missouri’s 154th District House of Representatives
Party	Candidate	Votes	%	±%
Republican	Gayle Kingery	10,277	73.8	
Libertarian	Larry S. Busby	3,640	26.2	

2006 General Election for Missouri’s 154th District House of Representatives
Party	Candidate	Votes	%	±%
Republican	Gayle Kingery	7,781	73.5	
Democratic	Nancy Lou Norman	2,802	26.5	

2004 General Election for Missouri’s 154th District House of Representatives
Party	Candidate	Votes	%	±%
Republican	Gayle Kingery	11,292	100.0	

2002 General Election for Missouri’s 154th District House of Representatives
Party	Candidate	Votes	%	±%
Republican	Gayle Kingery	5,998	68.1	
Democratic	Bill Stanberry	2,267	25.8	
Libertarian	Chip Taylor	538	6.1	
