= Tyler Hansbrough =

American basketball player (born 1985)

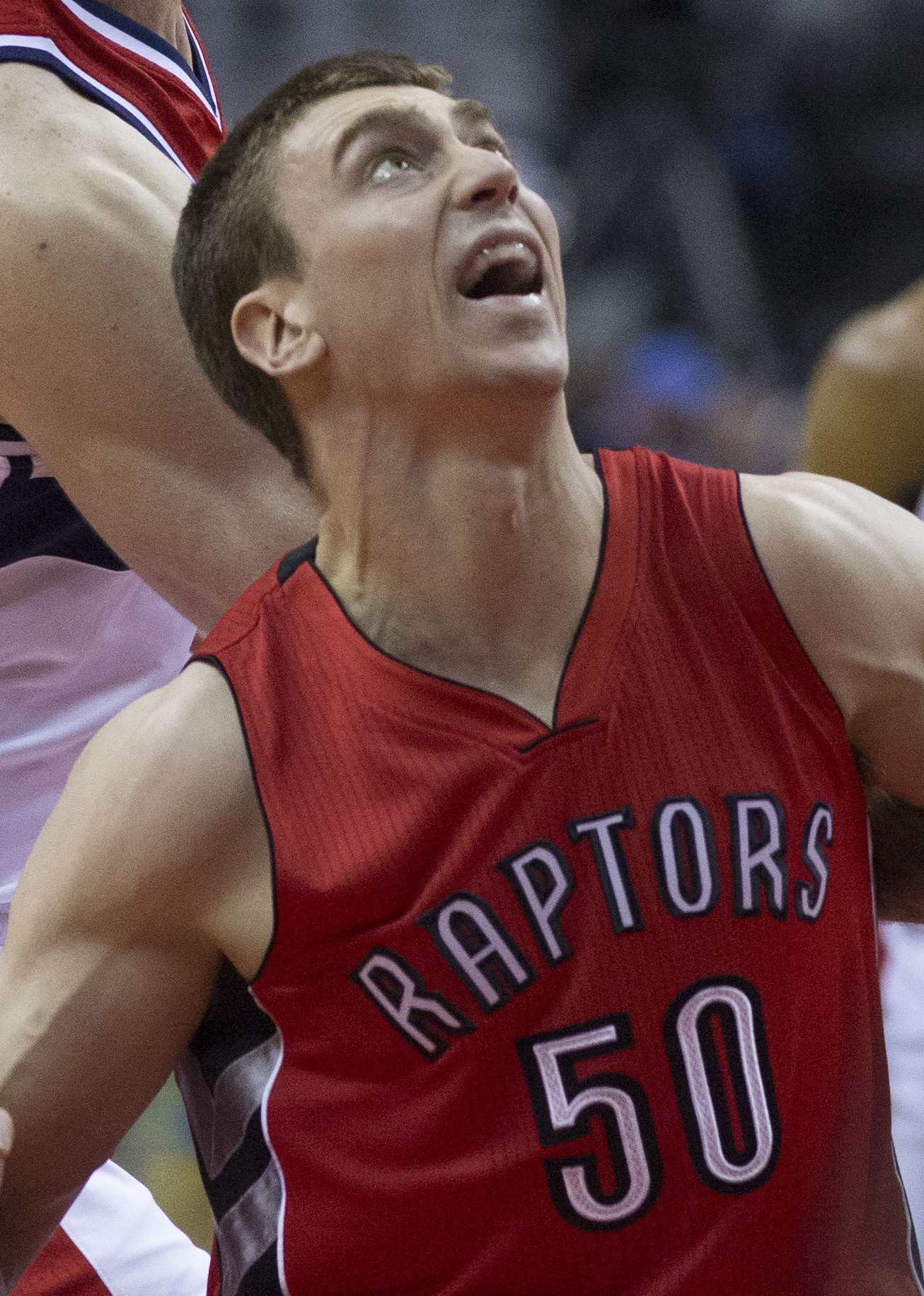
- Hansbrough with the Toronto Raptors in 2015

Personal information
- Born: November 3, 1985 (age 41) Columbia, Missouri, U.S.
- Listed height: 6 ft 9 in (2.06 m)
- Listed weight: 250 lb (113 kg)

Career information
- High school: Poplar Bluff (Poplar Bluff, Missouri)
- College: North Carolina (2005–2009)
- NBA draft: 2009: 1st round, 13th overall pick
- Drafted by: Indiana Pacers
- Playing career: 2009–2022
- Position: Power forward / center
- Number: 50

Career history
- 2009–2013: Indiana Pacers
- 2013–2015: Toronto Raptors
- 2015–2016: Charlotte Hornets
- 2017: Fort Wayne Mad Ants
- 2017–2018: Guangzhou Long-Lions
- 2018–2019: Zhejiang Golden Bulls
- 2019–2020: Sichuan Blue Whales
- 2022: Cangrejeros de Santurce

Career highlights
- NCAA champion (2009); National college player of the year (2008); 3× Consensus first-team All-American (2007–2009); Consensus second-team All-American (2006); USBWA National Freshman of the Year (2006); ACC Player of the Year (2008); 4× First-team All-ACC (2006–2009); ACC Rookie of the Year (2006); ACC All-Freshman Team (2006); ACC tournament MVP (2008); No. 50 retired by North Carolina Tar Heels; McDonald's All-American (2005); First-team Parade All-American (2005); Mr. Show-Me Basketball (2005)
- Stats at NBA.com
- Stats at Basketball Reference
- Collegiate Basketball Hall of Fame

Andrew Tyler Hansbrough (born November 3, 1985) is an American former professional basketball player. He played in the National Basketball Association (NBA) for seven seasons and also played internationally.

In college, Hansbrough was a star with the North Carolina Tar Heels from 2005 to 2009. He was the first player in Atlantic Coast Conference history to be named first-team All-ACC four times and to be a first-team All-American four times (he was a consensus first team pick in three of those seasons). Hansbrough was named ACC Rookie of the Year in 2006 and ACC Player of the Year in 2008; he also swept all national player of the year awards in 2008. Hansbrough won an NCAA championship in his senior season at North Carolina in 2009.

Following his college career, Hansbrough was selected by the Indiana Pacers with the 13th overall pick in the 2009 NBA draft. He played four seasons for the Pacers, two seasons for the Toronto Raptors and one season for the Charlotte Hornets. Hansbrough later played professionally in the NBA Development League, the Chinese Basketball Association, and the Baloncesto Superior Nacional.

== Early life ==
Hansbrough attended Poplar Bluff High School in Poplar Bluff, Missouri, where he led the Mules to back-to-back state championships and scored more than 2,500 career points. He had 29 points, 16 rebounds and two blocks in a 72–56 win over Vashon High in the state Class 5 championship game on March 12, 2005, ending the opposition's 60-game win streak. He averaged 28 points and 7.3 rebounds as a senior. In addition to being named Gatorade Player of the Year in Missouri, he was named a McDonald's and Parade All-American. He had 15 points and eight rebounds in the McDonald's All-America game, and had 24 points and nine rebounds and was named co-MVP of the Jordan Brand Classic.

On April 9, 2005, Hansbrough scored 31 points in a 106–98 USA win over the World Select Team in the Nike Hoop Summit in Memphis, Tennessee, tying the USA record for points in the game.

== College career ==
=== Freshman season ===
As a freshman at North Carolina in 2005–06, Hansbrough became the only player in ACC history to earn First Team All-America honors as a freshman. He was honored by The Sporting News and Rupp, and was named third-team All-America by the Associated Press, NABC and Basketball Times. He was only the third ACC freshman to earn AP All-America honors, joining Kenny Anderson and Stephon Marbury of Georgia Tech. He was selected the National Freshman of the Year by USBWA, ESPN.com, The Sporting News, and Basketball Times, and earned unanimous selection as the ACC Rookie of the Year and was the first freshman to earn unanimous first-team All-ACC honors in league history. On February 15, 2006, Hansbrough set a Dean Smith Center scoring record and an ACC freshman scoring record when he scored 40 points in a home game against Georgia Tech. Hansbrough had the highest scoring average ever by a Tar Heel freshman at 18.9 per game, good for second in the ACC in scoring. He became the first Tar Heel freshman to lead the team in scoring and rebounding, and was the first Tar Heel (and seventh ACC player) to lead his team in scoring, rebounding, field goal percentage and steals in the same season.

=== Sophomore season ===
A consensus first-team All-American as a sophomore in 2006–07, Hansbrough was voted UNC's Most Valuable Player by his teammates and coaches. He was a unanimous first-team All-ACC selection for the second consecutive year and led UNC (fourth in the ACC) in scoring with an average of 18.4 points per game. Tyler led the team and was second in the ACC in rebounds (7.9 per game) and grabbed double figures in rebounds 11 times. He was sixth in the ACC in field goal percentage and ninth in free throw percentage, and was one of three players (along with Florida State's Al Thornton and Boston College's Jared Dudley) to rank in the Top 10 in both field goal and free throw percentage.

On March 4, 2007, Hansbrough had 26 points and 17 rebounds before suffering an injury in the closing seconds of the Tar Heels' 86–72 win over Duke, clinching the top seed in the Atlantic Coast Conference tournament. With 14.5 seconds left in the game, Hansbrough leaped for a rebound after a missed free throw attempt by a teammate. After the ball left his hand, he was struck in the face by Gerald Henderson's right elbow. The errant elbow broke Hansbrough's nose. Henderson was ejected from the game and received an automatic one-game suspension from the NCAA.

=== Junior season ===
As a junior in 2007–08, Hansbrough was named the consensus National Player of the Year (NPOY). He became the 11th Tar Heel to earn NPOY honors and was the fourth player in ACC history to win National Player of the Year, ACC Player of the Year, ACC Tournament MVP and NCAA Regional MVP honors in the same season. He was voted the ACC Male Athlete of the Year, only the third Tar Heel to win the award in 24 years, and became the third player in ACC history to be unanimously selected three times to the All-ACC team, joining North Carolina State's David Thompson (1973–75) and Duke's Art Heyman (1961–63).

Hansbrough tied the ACC single-season record by scoring in double figures in 39 games, and scored 882 points, second-most in school history, and the most since Lennie Rosenbluth had 895 in 1956–57. Hansbrough was second in total points in the NCAA behind Davidson's Stephen Curry (931), and had 399 rebounds, a UNC single-season record. He led the ACC in scoring and rebounding and ranked 12th nationally in scoring and 17th in rebounding, becoming the first player to lead the ACC in both categories since Antawn Jamison in 1997–98. Hansbrough's average of 22.6 points per game was the highest average by a Tar Heel since Charlie Scott (27.1 ppg) in 1969–70. With 10.2 rebounds per game, he became the seventh Tar Heel to lead the ACC in rebounding and just the third Tar Heel in 30 years to average a double-double.

On February 3, 2008, in a game against Florida State, Hansbrough broke Lennie Rosenbluth's 51-year-old school record for made free throws. In the ACC semifinals on March 15, 2008, Hansbrough hit a baseline jump shot with 0.8 seconds remaining to give the Tar Heels a 68–66 victory over Virginia Tech. In the Final Four, Hansbrough was held below his season averages in both points and rebounds against Kansas, largely by freshman Cole Aldrich, as North Carolina lost the national semifinal, 84–66.

=== Senior season ===
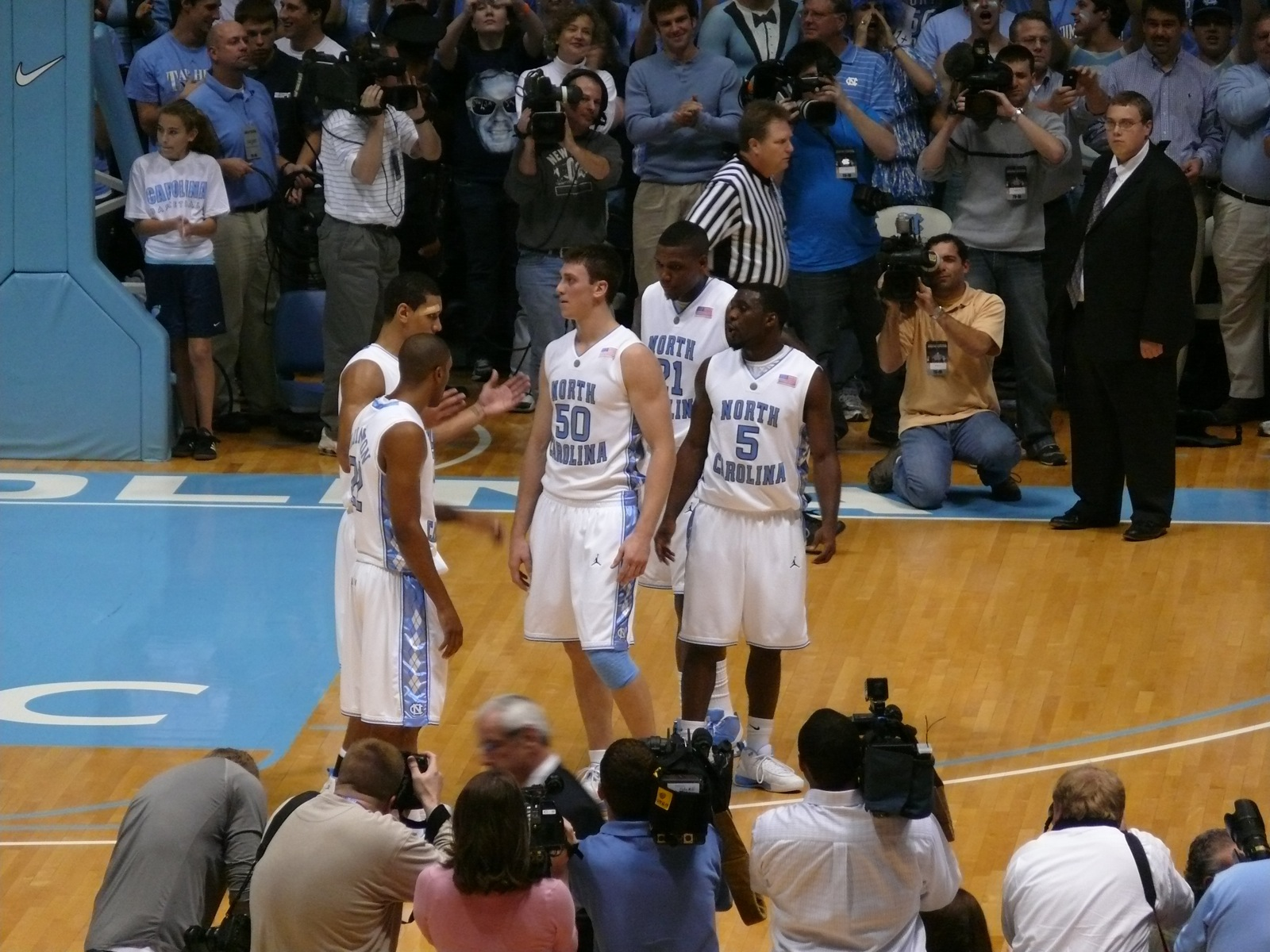
Hansbrough is congratulated after setting the school scoring record on December 18, 2008.

Hansbrough was the Tar Heels' co-MVP with Ty Lawson as a senior in 2008–09. He finished third in the ACC Player of the Year balloting behind Lawson and Florida State's Toney Douglas, after finishing the year second in the ACC in scoring at 20.7 points per game and sixth in field goal percentage, free throw percentage and rebounding. He made a career-best 28 straight free throws early in the season and shot a career-best 84.1 percent from the free throw line, improving his free throw accuracy for a third straight season. He scored 18 points in each of North Carolina's Final Four wins against Villanova and Michigan State, helping the Tar Heels win the 2009 NCAA championship and subsequently being named to the All-Final Four team.

Due to right shin and left ankle ailments, Hansbrough missed four games early on in the 2008–09 season, the first he had missed as a Tar Heel. On December 18, 2008, in a home game against Evansville, Hansbrough broke North Carolina's all-time career scoring record, surpassing a 30-year-old mark held by Phil Ford (2,290 points). Ten days later, Hansbrough grabbed his 1,000th career rebound in a game against Rutgers, becoming one of seven UNC players to record 1,000 career rebounds. On February 28, 2009, Hansbrough made his 906th career free throw in UNC's 104–74 win over Georgia Tech, breaking Dickie Hemric's (Wake Forest) NCAA record, set in 1955. His unorthodox post moves drew many whistles from officials. Hansbrough finished his career with 982 made free throws.

=== Career highs ===
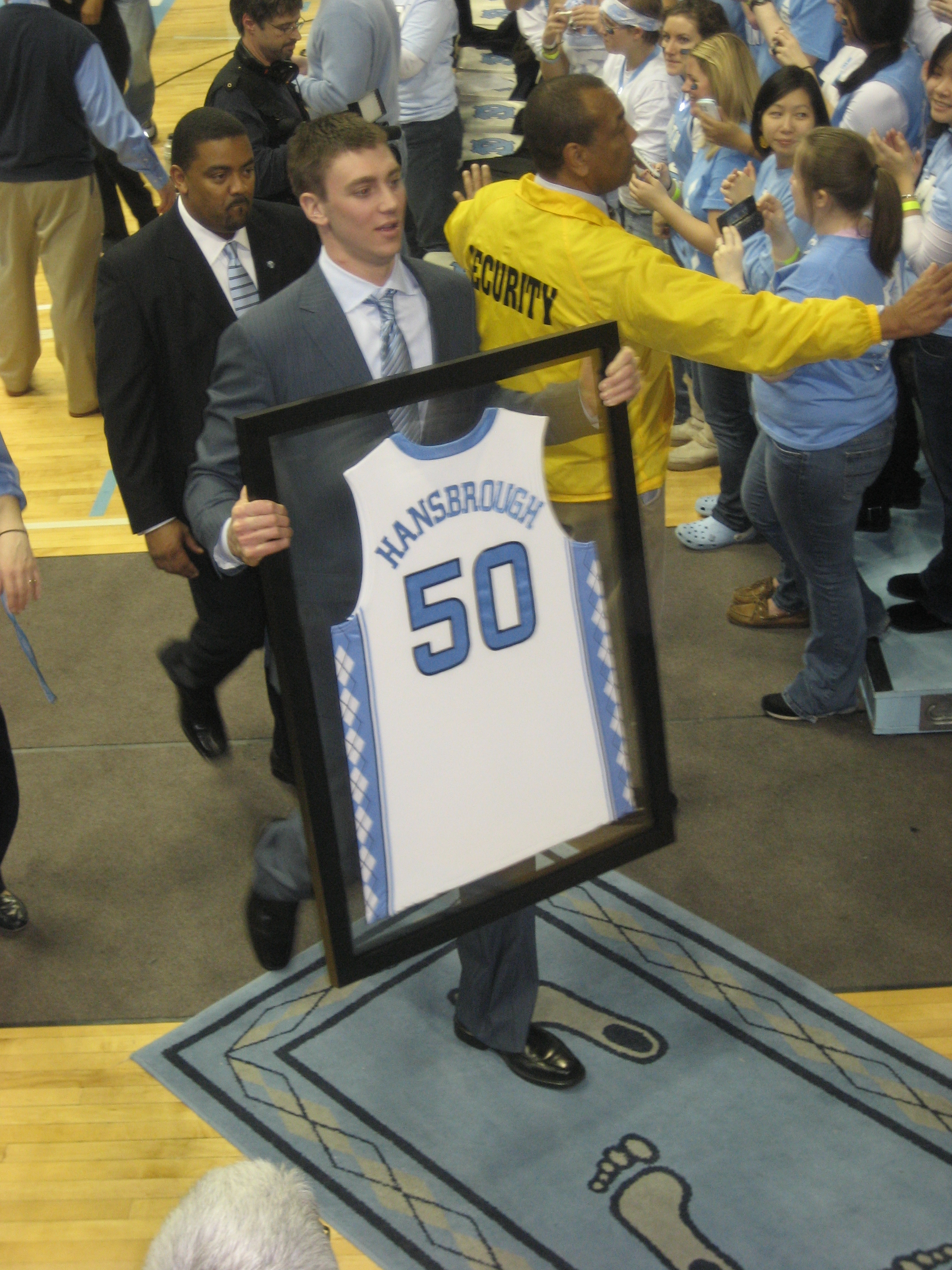
Hansbrough walking back to the players' tunnel after his jersey retirement ceremony on February 10, 2010

- Points: 40 vs. Georgia Tech (2/15/06)
- Field Goals: 13 vs. Georgia Tech (2/15/06), vs. Notre Dame (11/26/08)
- Field Goal Attempts: 21 vs. Duke (2/6/08), at Duke (3/8/08)
- Three-Pointers: 2 vs. Duke (3/8/09)
- Free Throws Made: 17 vs. Clemson (2/10/08)
- Free Throw Attempts: 19 vs. Georgia Tech (2/15/06), vs. Clemson (2/10/08)
- Offensive Rebounds: 9 vs. UC Santa Barbara (11/25/05), vs. Duke (3/4/07)
- Rebounds: 21 at Florida State (2/3/08)
- Assists: 4 vs. Tennessee (11/24/06), NC State (2/18/09)
- Turnovers: 8 at Maryland (2/2/06)
- Blocks: 3 at Virginia (1/15/09)
- Steals: 8 vs. UNC Asheville (12/28/05)
- Minutes: 47 vs. Clemson (2/10/08, 2OT)

=== College career legacy ===
Hansbrough was the first player in ACC history to earn first-team All-America and first-team All-ACC honors in each of his four seasons. He finished his career with a league-record 2,872 points and a school-record 1,219 rebounds to go with the NCAA record of 982 made free throws. While attending North Carolina, Hansbrough was given the nickname "Psycho T" due to his size and aggressive play style, as well as his off-court personality.

In 2008, Hansbrough swept all major individual honors in men's college basketball. For a North Carolina men's player to be eligible to have his jersey retired, he must win at least one of six national player of the year awards: Associated Press, U.S. Basketball Writers Association, National Association of Basketball Coaches, Sporting News, Naismith, and Wooden. Since Hansbrough won all six, he had his number 50 retired during halftime against Duke on February 10, 2010.

== Professional career ==
=== Indiana Pacers (2009–2013) ===
In 2009, Hansbrough was selected by the Indiana Pacers with the 13th overall pick in the 2009 NBA draft. After missing the preseason and the first four games of the regular season with an injury to his shin, he made his NBA debut against the Washington Wizards on November 6, 2009. Hansbrough was limited to 29 games in his rookie season due to assorted injuries including a season-long bout with vertigo.

In the 2010–2011 season, Hansbrough played in 70 games for the Pacers and started 29. He averaged 11 points and 5.3 rebounds per game. On June 30, 2013, the Pacers tendered a qualifying offer to make Hansbrough a restricted free agent. However, two days later, the Pacers rescinded their qualifying offer to Hansbrough, making him an unrestricted free agent.

=== Toronto Raptors (2013–2015) ===
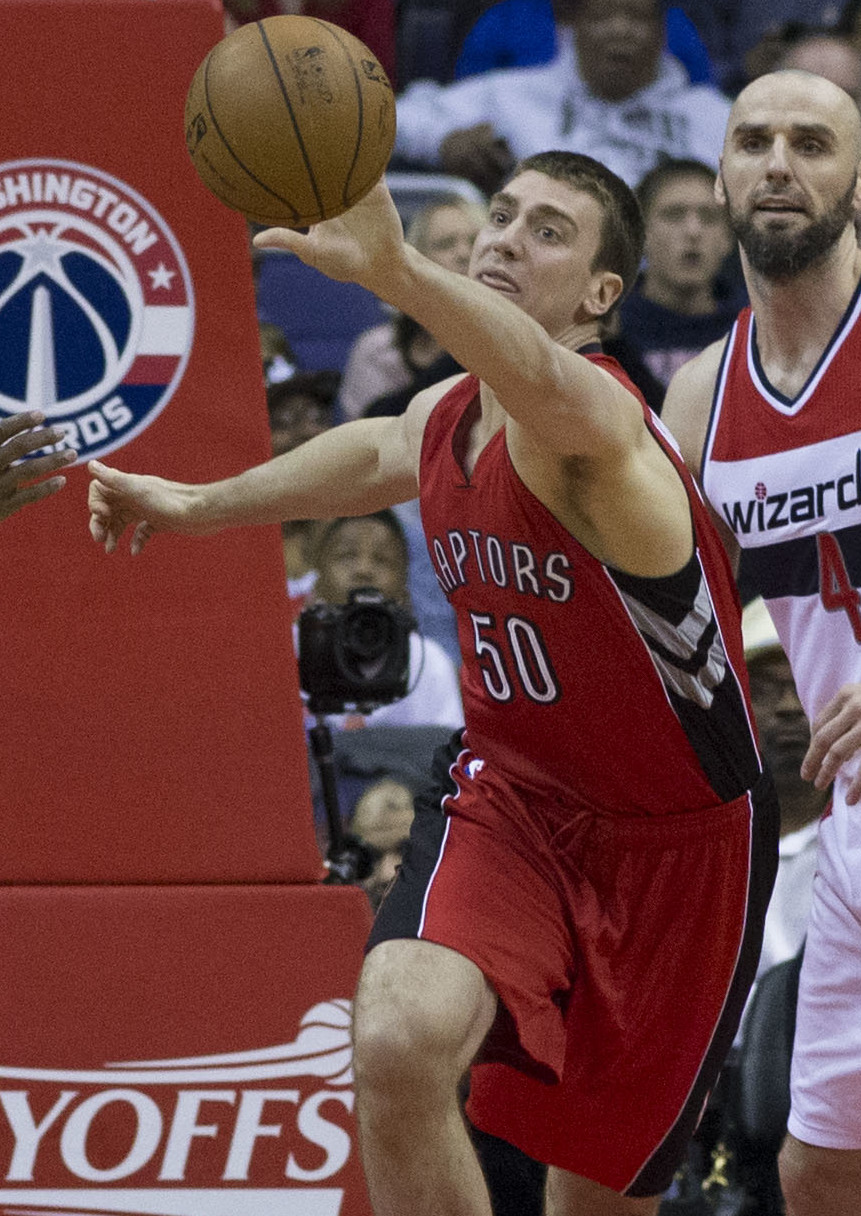
Hansbrough with the Raptors in April 2015

Hansbrough signed a two-year deal with the Toronto Raptors on July 15, 2013.

=== Charlotte Hornets (2015–2016) ===
On July 22, 2015, Hansbrough signed a one-year deal with the Charlotte Hornets.

=== Fort Wayne Mad Ants (2017) ===
On March 1, 2017, Hansbrough was acquired by the Fort Wayne Mad Ants of the NBA Development League.

=== Guangzhou Long-Lions (2017–2018) ===
Hansbrough signed with the Guangzhou Long-Lions of the Chinese Basketball Association on July 26, 2017.

=== Zhejiang Golden Bulls (2018–2019) ===
In October 2018, Hansbrough signed with the Zhejiang Golden Bulls, returning to China for a second stint.

=== Sichuan Blue Whales (2019–2021) ===
On November 28, 2019, Hansbrough was reported to have signed with the Sichuan Blue Whales. On December 13, 2019, Hansbrough recorded a career-high 49 points and 22 rebounds in a 108–105 victory over the Jiangsu Dragons. The Chinese Basketball Association suspended play on February 1, 2020, due to the COVID-19 pandemic before later resuming in June of the same year.

On October 4, 2020, Hansbrough was reported to have re-signed with the Sichuan Blue Whales for a second season, but did not appear in a game for the team during the 2020–21 Chinese Basketball Association season due to the ongoing COVID-19 Pandemic and associated travel restrictions.

== Broadcasting career ==
Hansbrough made his broadcasting debut on February 18, 2021, as a color commentator for the ACC Network when the North Carolina Tar Heels took on the Northeastern Huskies.

== Career statistics ==
Legend
GP	Games played	GS	Games started	MPG	Minutes per game
FG%	Field goal percentage	3P%	3-point field goal percentage	FT%	Free throw percentage
RPG	Rebounds per game	APG	Assists per game	SPG	Steals per game
BPG	Blocks per game	PPG	Points per game	**Bold**	Career high
*	Led the league

=== NBA ===
==== Regular season ====
Year	Team	GP	GS	MPG	FG%	3P%	FT%	RPG	APG	SPG	BPG	PPG
2009–10	Indiana	29	1	17.6	.360	.000	.743	4.8	**1.0**	.6	**.3**	8.5
2010–11	Indiana	70	**29**	**21.9**	.465	.000	.779	**5.2**	.6	.5	.2	**11.0**
2011–12	Indiana	66*	0	21.8	.405	.000	**.813**	4.4	.5	**.8**	.1	9.3
2012–13	Indiana	**81**	8	16.9	.432	.000	.720	4.6	.4	.4	.2	7.0
2013–14	Toronto	64	4	15.3	.474	.000	.681	4.5	.3	.4	**.3**	4.9
2014–15	Toronto	74	8	14.3	**.521**	.143	.698	3.6	.3	.4	.2	3.6
2015–16	Charlotte	44	0	7.8	.451	**.667**	.585	2.0	.2	.3	.2	2.4
Career		428	50	16.9	.439	.136	.738	4.2	.4	.5	.2	6.7

==== Playoffs ====
Year	Team	GP	GS	MPG	FG%	3P%	FT%	RPG	APG	SPG	BPG	PPG
2011	Indiana	5	**5**	**32.8**	.333	.000	**.889**	**5.4**	**1.0**	**1.2**	.0	**11.2**
2012	Indiana	11	0	14.9	.340	.000	.667	3.2	.5	.5	**.3**	4.4
2013	Indiana	**19**	0	12.7	**.419**	.000	.591	3.2	.3	.3	.0	4.1
2014	Toronto	3	0	9.7	.333	.000	.833	2.0	.3	.0	.0	2.3
2015	Toronto	4	2	12.0	.200	.000	.750	1.5	.8	.5	**.3**	1.3
2016	Charlotte	2	0	3.0	.000	.000	.000	.0	.0	.0	.0	.0
Career		44	7	14.8	.361	.000	.688	3.1	.5	.4	.1	4.4

=== G-League ===
==== Regular season ====
Year	Team	GP	GS	MPG	FG%	3P%	FT%	RPG	APG	SPG	BPG	PPG
2016	Fort Wayne	13	11	33.4	.543	.333	.776	12.2	0.7	0.8	.5	17.6
Career		13	11	33.4	.543	.333	.776	12.2	0.7	0.8	.5	17.6

==== Playoffs ====
Year	Team	GP	GS	MPG	FG%	3P%	FT%	RPG	APG	SPG	BPG	PPG
2017	Fort Wayne	3	3	44.3	.634	.000	.885	15.3	1.7	2.7	1.0	25.0
Career		3	3	44.3	.634	.000	.885	15.3	1.7	2.7	1.0	25.0

=== CBA ===
Year	Team	GP	GS	MPG	FG%	3P%	FT%	RPG	APG	SPG	BPG	PPG
2017–18	Guangzhou	**39**	1	26.7	**.591**	.000	.811	9.9	0.7	1.3	.6	20.9
2018–19	Zhejiang	27	**15**	32.0	.555	.000	.790	10.9	1.0	1.6	.5	20.1
2019–20	Sichuan	17	6	**36.5**	.545	**.143**	**.883**	**13.4**	**1.4**	**1.7**	.6	**32.3**
Career		83	22	30.4	.567	.074	.827	11.0	1.0	1.5	.6	23.0

=== College ===
Year	Team	GP	GS	MPG	FG%	3P%	FT%	RPG	APG	SPG	BPG	PPG
2005–06	North Carolina	31	30	30.4	**.570**	**.500**	.739	7.8	**1.3**	1.2	**.7**	18.9
2006–07	North Carolina	38	38	29.9	.525	.250	.768	7.9	1.2	1.1	.4	18.4
2007–08	North Carolina	**39**	**39**	**33.0**	.540	.000	.806	**10.2**	.9	**1.5**	.4	**22.6**
2008–09	North Carolina	34	34	30.3	.514	.391	**.849**	8.1	1.0	1.2	.4	20.7
Career		142	141	31.0	.536	.316	.791	8.6	1.1	1.3	.5	20.2

== Personal life ==
Hansbrough's parents, Gene and Tami, are divorced. His father is an orthopedic surgeon, while his mother served as an associate director of development at the UNC School of Dentistry between 2008 and 2012.

Hansbrough and his two brothers, Greg and Ben, have always been close. They formed a special bond when big brother Greg had a brain tumor removed at age eight. Greg, despite being told he would never play organized sports, became the captain of his high school cross-country team, lettered in basketball and by 2011, he had run three marathons and 13 half-marathons. Hansbrough is a bachelor.

== See also ==
- List of NCAA Division I men's basketball career scoring leaders
- List of NCAA Division I men's basketball career free throw scoring leaders
- List of NCAA Division I men's basketball players with 2000 points and 1000 rebounds
