= Poplar Bluff High School =

Location
- 3209 Oak Grove Road; Poplar Bluff, Missouri 63901; United States; 36.7922°N 90.4513°W

Information
- Type: Public high school
- Established: c. 1896
- School district: Poplar Bluff R-1 School District
- Superintendent: Scott Dill
- Principal: Dr. Valerie Ivy
- Teaching staff: 86.63 (FTE)
- Grades: 9-12
- Enrollment: 1,416 (2024-2025)
- Student to teacher ratio: 16.35
- Colors: Maroon and white
- Team name: Mules
- Website: hs.pbmules.com

Poplar Bluff High School is a public high school in Poplar Bluff, Missouri, United States. It is a part of the Poplar Bluff R-1 School District.

== Notable alumni ==
- Darrell Atchison - member of the Missouri House of Representatives
- Ben Hansbrough – former NBA player
- Tyler Hansbrough – former NBA player, 2009 NCAA champion with North Carolina
- Gayle Kingery – former member of the Missouri House of Representatives
- Kameron Misner – professional baseball player in the Tampa Bay Rays organization
- Derland Moore – former NFL defensive lineman
