= Brother Rice High School (Chicago) =

Location
- 10001 South Pulaski Road; Chicago, Illinois, 60655-3356; United States; 41°42′40″N 87°43′11″W

Information
- Type: Private parochial boys' school
- Motto: Viriliter in Christo Jesu (Act Manfully in Christ Jesus)
- Denomination: Catholic
- Established: 1956
- Authority: Congregation of Christian Brothers
- Oversight: Congregation of Christian Brothers
- Principal: Robert Alberts
- Teaching staff: 57.3 (on an FTE basis)
- Grades: 9–12
- Enrollment: 698
- Student to teacher ratio: 12.2
- Campus type: Urban
- Colors: Maroon and orange
- Athletics conference: Chicago Catholic League
- Nickname: Crusaders
- Accreditation: North Central Association of Colleges and Schools
- Tuition: US$12,480
- Website: www.brotherrice.org

Brother Rice High School is a Catholic, all-male college preparatory institution in Chicago, Illinois, administered under the Congregation of Christian Brothers. On the same block of land, directly to the east, is the all-female Mother McAuley Liberal Arts High School, while Saint Xavier University is just to the south of Mother McAuley, and to the southeast of Brother Rice. Its enrollment is mostly drawn from local neighborhoods such as Beverly, Mount Greenwood, West Lawn, Morgan Park, and Ashburn, as well as local suburban municipalities such as Oak Lawn, Evergreen Park, Palos Heights, Orland Park, Tinley Park, Burbank, and Alsip. The Christian Brothers founded the school in 1956. The school's namesake is the founder of their religious order, Edmund Ignatius Rice. It is affiliated with the identically-named Brother Rice High School in Bloomfield Hills, Michigan.

== School colors and seal ==
The school colors are maroon and orange. The maroon was taken from the maroon and gold colors of Iona College founded in 1940 by the Congregation of Christian Brothers in New Rochelle, New York. The orange is taken from the black and orange colors of Leo Catholic High School in Chicago, Illinois, also opened by the Christian Brothers in 1926. The Brother Rice school seal has similar design features to the seal of Iona College.

== Academics ==
The school is a college preparatory school. The minimum graduation requirements for every student give them the qualifications to enter any state university in Illinois.

=== Honors/Advanced Placement program ===
The school offers the following Advanced Placement courses: Spanish Language, French Language, U.S. History, European History, Music Theory, Chemistry, German Language, Economics, and U.S. Government.

The school also offers one of the AP Computer Science courses, but calls it AP Java without specifying whether the course is AP Computer Science 'A' or 'AB'. The school also lists an "Advanced Placement" Computer Science course using C++, though this has been discontinued by the College Board as an option in their AP program, which exclusively emphasizes Java. The school lists a single AP course which prepares students to take both the AP English Language and AP English Literature tests. The AP Calculus class permits students the option to take either the 'AB' or 'BC' AP test.

A four-semester course, open to juniors and seniors, allows CCNA certification.

=== Curriculum and Educational Support Committees ===
The Curriculum Committee and Educational Support Committee serve as advisory boards to the principal on all matters relating to educational improvement, course offerings, course changes, and overall curriculum development. This school board addresses concerns of the faculty, staff, administration, and students in efforts of academic improvement.

== Athletics ==
Brother Rice competes in the Chicago Catholic League (CCL), and is a member of the Illinois High School Association (IHSA), the organization which governs most sports and competitive activities in the state. The team is nicknamed the Crusaders.

The school sponsors interscholastic teams in baseball, basketball, bass fishing, bowling, cross country, football, golf, soccer, swimming & diving, tennis, track & field, volleyball, water polo, wrestling and lacrosse. While not sponsored by the IHSA, the school also sponsors teams in ice hockey and rugby. The Brother Rice rugby team has won nine state championships and one national championship since the team's formation.

The following teams have won their respective state tournaments sponsored by the IHSA:

- Baseball: 1976 (runner-up in 2023)
- Football: 1981, 2025 (runner-up in 1985 and 2018)
- Water Polo: 2003
- Rugby: 2019

Prior to the IHSA sponsoring water polo in 2002, Brother Rice won 13 state titles (1980, 1981, 1982, 1983, 1984, 1985, 1986, 1988, 1989, 1994, 1995, 1996, 1998).

The Chicago Catholic League's ice hockey champion wins the Kennedy Cup, an award that has been contested since 1964; the oldest high school ice hockey prize in Illinois. Brother Rice has won this award five times (1970, 1971, 1972, 1976, 2001).

The Prep Bowl pits the Chicago Catholic League champion versus the Chicago Public League champion, in a football game played at Soldier Field. Brother Rice has appeared in eight Prep Bowls (1975, 1980, 1992, 1994, 2004, 2005, 2006, 2012), having won five, which is the 4th most of all time.

== Notable alumni ==
- Mike Castle (2007), actor best known for starring in the TBS television series Clipped.
- Kevin Cronin (1969), songwriter, rhythm guitarist, and lead singer of REO Speedwagon
- Michael Flatley (1977), Irish dancer, creator of Lord of the Dance and co-choreographer of Riverdance
- John R. Powers (1963), author of Do Black Patent Leather Shoes Really Reflect Up?, which was made into a Broadway play (1945-2013)
- John C. Reilly (1983), actor and comedian, nominated for an Academy Award for performance in 2002 musical film Chicago
- Thomas Tunney (1973), alderman in Chicago's north side Lakeview neighborhood.
- John J. York (1977), actor on General Hospital
- Jim Zulevic (1983), actor and comedian (1965-2006)

=== Sports ===
- Jim Adduci (1977), former MLB outfielder, starred collegiately at Southern Illinois
- David Diehl (1998), former NFL offensive lineman for the New York Giants, Super Bowl champion & Pro Bowler, starred collegiately at Illinois
- Mark Donahue (1974), former NFL offensive lineman, starred collegiately as a 2-time All-American at Michigan
- Bobby Frasor (2005), McDonald's HS All-American point guard, played at North Carolina where he won the 2009 national title. Former head varsity basketball coach at Brother Rice
- Andy Gallik (2010), former NFL center for the Tennessee Titans.
- Phil Hicks (1971), former NBA forward, drafted #27 in 1976 NBA Draft, starred collegiately at Tulane
- Rico Hill (1995), former CBA, NBA-D League and European Basketball forward, drafted #31 in 1999 NBA Draft, starred collegiately at Illinois State and was named 1998 Missouri Valley Conference POY
- Paul Hutchins (1989), former NFL Offensive Tackle for Green Bay Packers 1993–1994, starred collegiately at Western Michigan
- Jack Lausch (2022), college baseball outfielder at Northwestern and former starting quarterback
- Pete Mackanin (1969), former MLB manager of the Philadelphia Phillies, Pittsburgh Pirates and Cincinnati Reds, former MLB infielder (1973–81)
- John Meyer (1960), former AFL linebacker and NFL assistant coach, starred collegiately at Notre Dame
- Michael Massey (2016), American professional baseball second baseman for the Kansas City Royals of Major League Baseball (MLB). He made his MLB debut in 7/15/2022.
- Ed Olczyk (1984), United States Hockey Hall of Famer, Stanley Cup champion, former center, head coach and broadcaster, drafted #3 in 1984 NHL Draft
- Trey Pierce (2023), college football defensive tackle for the Michigan Wolverines
- Lance Ten Broeck (1974), PGA golfer currently on the Senior Tour, won 1984 Illinois Open Championship, starred collegiately as an All-American at Texas
- Xazavian Valladay (2018), NFL running back for the DC Defenders of the United Football League (UFL), starred collegiately at Wyoming and Arizona State
