= 2008–09 NCAA Division I men's basketball rankings =

- Season: 2008–09
- NCAA Tournament: 2009
- Preseason No. 1: North Carolina
- NCAA Tournament Champions: North Carolina
NCAA Division I men's basketball rankings


Two human polls made up the 2008–09 NCAA Division I men's basketball rankings, the AP Poll and the Coaches Poll, in addition to various publications' preseason polls.

== Legend ==
	Increase in ranking
	Decrease in ranking
	Not ranked previous week
Italics	Number of first place votes
(#-#)	Win–loss record
т	Tied with team above or below also with this symbol

== AP poll ==
The Associated Press (AP) preseason poll was released on October 31, 2008. This poll is compiled by sportswriters across the nation. In Division I men's and women's college basketball, the AP Poll is largely just a tool to compare schools throughout the season and spark debate, as it has no bearing on postseason play. Generally, all top 25 teams in the poll are invited to the NCAA basketball tournament, also known as March Madness.

	Preseason Oct 31	Week 1 Nov 17	Week 2 Nov 24	Week 3 Dec 1	Week 4 Dec 8	Week 5 Dec 15	Week 6 Dec 22	Week 7 Dec 29	Week 8 Jan 5	Week 9 Jan 12	Week 10 Jan 19	Week 11 Jan 26	Week 12 Feb 2	Week 13 Feb 9	Week 14 Feb 16	Week 15 Feb 23	Week 16 Mar 2	Week 17 Mar 9	Week 18 Mar 16	
1.	North Carolina (72)	North Carolina (2–0) 72	North Carolina (3–0) 72	North Carolina (7–0) 72	North Carolina (8–0) 72	North Carolina (9–0) 72	North Carolina (11–0) 71	North Carolina (12–0) 72	Pittsburgh (14–0) 70	Pittsburgh (15–0) 70	Wake Forest (16–0) 68	Duke (18–1) 62	Connecticut (20–1) 64	Connecticut (22–1) 67	Connecticut (24–1) 66	Pittsburgh (25–2) 69	Connecticut (27–2) 67	North Carolina (27–3) 35	Louisville (28–5) 45	1.
2.	Connecticut	Connecticut (1–0)	Connecticut (4–0)	Connecticut (6–0)	Connecticut (8–0)	Connecticut (8–0)	Connecticut (10–0)	Connecticut (11–0)	Duke (12–1)	Wake Forest (14–0) 2	Duke (16–1) 4	Connecticut (18–1) 6	Oklahoma (21–1) 5	Oklahoma (23–1) 3	Oklahoma (25–1) 4	Connecticut (25–2) 1	North Carolina (25–3) 3	Pittsburgh (28–3) 33	North Carolina (28–4) 11	2.
3.	Louisville	Louisville (0–0)	Louisville (2–0)	Pittsburgh (7–0)	Pittsburgh (9–0)	Pittsburgh (10–0)	Pittsburgh (12–0)	Pittsburgh (12–0)	North Carolina (13–1) 2	Duke (14–1)	Connecticut (16–1)	Pittsburgh (18–1) 3	North Carolina (19–2) 3	North Carolina (21–2) 2	North Carolina (23–2) 2	Oklahoma (25–2) 2	Pittsburgh (26–3) 1	Connecticut (27–3)	Memphis (31–3) 11	3.
4.	UCLA	UCLA (2–0)	Pittsburgh (4–0)	Duke (7–0)	Gonzaga (6–0)	Oklahoma (10–0)	Oklahoma (11–0)	Oklahoma (12–0)	Wake Forest (13–0)	Connecticut (14–1)	Pittsburgh (16–1)	Oklahoma (19–1) 1	Duke (19–2)	Pittsburgh (21–2)	Pittsburgh (23–2)	North Carolina (24–3)	Oklahoma (26–3)	Memphis (28–3) 2	Pittsburgh (28–4) 3	4.
5.	Pittsburgh	Michigan State (1–0)	Michigan State (2–0)	Gonzaga (5–0)	Oklahoma (8–0)	Texas (8–1)	Duke (10–1)	Duke (10–1)	Connecticut (12–1)	North Carolina (14–2)	North Carolina (16–2)	North Carolina (17–2)	Louisville (17–3)	Louisville (18–4)	Memphis (22–3)	Memphis (24–3)	Memphis (26–3) 1	Louisville (25–5) 1	Connecticut (27–4) 1	5.
6.	Michigan State	Pittsburgh (1–0)	Texas (2–0)	Oklahoma (6–0)	Texas (6–1)	Duke (8–1)	Wake Forest (10–0)	Wake Forest (11–0)	Oklahoma (13–1)	Oklahoma (15–1)	Oklahoma (17–1)	Wake Forest (16–1)	Pittsburgh (19–2)	Duke (20–3)	Michigan State (20–4)	Louisville (21–5)	Louisville (23–5)	Oklahoma (27–4)	Duke (28–6)	6.
7.	Texas	Texas (1–0)	Duke (6–0)	Notre Dame (5–1)	Duke (8–1)	Xavier (9–0)	Gonzaga (8–2)	Notre Dame (9–2)	Texas (11–2)	Michigan State (13–2)	Michigan State (15–2)	Louisville (15–3)	Wake Forest (17–2)	Wake Forest (18–3)	Louisville (19–5)	Duke (22–5)	Duke (24–5)	Michigan State (25–5)	Oklahoma (27–5)	7.
8.	Duke	Notre Dame (1–0)	Notre Dame (2–0)	Texas (5–1)	Tennessee (6–1)	Gonzaga (7–1)	Notre Dame (8–2)	Texas (10–2)	Michigan State (11–2)	Syracuse (16–1)	Syracuse (17–2)	Marquette (17–2)	Marquette (19–2)	Memphis (20–3)	Wake Forest (19–4)	Marquette (23–4)	Michigan State (23–5)	Wake Forest (24–5)	Michigan State (26–6)	8.
9.	Notre Dame	Gonzaga (1–0)	Gonzaga (2–0)	Purdue (5–1)	Louisville (4–1)	Louisville (6–1)	Texas (9–2)	Purdue (11–2)	Georgetown (10–2)	UCLA (13–2)	Louisville (13–3)	Michigan State (16–3)	Xavier (19–2)	Michigan State (19–4)	Duke (20–5)	Michigan State (21–5)	Kansas (24–5)	Duke (25–6)	Missouri (28–6)	9.
10.	Gonzaga	Duke (3–0)	Purdue (4–0)	Tennessee (5–1)	Xavier (7–0)	Wake Forest (9–0)	Purdue (9–2)	Michigan State (9–2)	UCLA (12–2)	Clemson (16–0)	Clemson (16–1)	Xavier (17–2)	Clemson (18–2)	Marquette (20–3)	Marquette (21–4)	Villanova (22–5)	Wake Forest (22–5)	Villanova (25–6)	Gonzaga (26–5)	10.
11.	Purdue	Purdue (1–0)	Oklahoma (4–0)	Louisville (2–1)	Wake Forest (8–0)	Syracuse (9–0)	Michigan State (8–2)	Georgetown (9–1)	Syracuse (14–1)	Texas (12–3)	Marquette (16–2)	Texas (14–4)	Butler (19–1)	UCLA (19–4)	Missouri (22–4)	Missouri (23–4)	Villanova (23–6)	Kansas (25–6)	Villanova (26–7)	11.
12.	Oklahoma	Oklahoma (1–0)	Tennessee (3–0)	UCLA (4–1)	Notre Dame (6–2)	Notre Dame (7–2)	Georgetown (8–1)	UCLA (10–2)	Clemson (14–0)	Notre Dame (12–3)	Georgetown (12–4)	Clemson (17–2)	Purdue (17–4)	Clemson (19–3)	Villanova (20–5)	Clemson (22–4)	LSU (25–4)	Gonzaga (25–5)	Wake Forest (24–6)	12.
13.	Memphis	Memphis (1–0)	UCLA (3–1)	Michigan State (4–1)	Syracuse (8–0)	Purdue (8–2)	UCLA (8–2)	Syracuse (12–1)	Notre Dame (10–3)	Georgetown (11–3)	UCLA (14–3)	Butler (18–1)	Michigan State (17–4)	Villanova (19–4)	Clemson (20–4)	Wake Forest (20–5)	Marquette (23–6)	Washington (24–7)	Syracuse (26–9)	13.
14.	Tennessee	Tennessee (1–0)	Arizona State (3–0)	Xavier (6–0)	Purdue (6–2)	UCLA (6–2)	Xavier (9–1)	Tennessee (8–2)	Purdue (11–3)	Marquette (15–2)	Texas (13–4)	Arizona State (16–3)	Memphis (18–3)	Xavier (20–3)	Arizona State (20–5)	Arizona State (21–5)	Gonzaga (23–5)	Missouri (25–6)	Kansas (25–7)	14.
15.	Arizona State	Arizona State (1–0) т	Marquette (3–0)	Wake Forest (6–0)	Villanova (8–0)	Georgetown (7–1)	Ohio State (8–0)	Villanova (11–1)	Tennessee (9–3)	Xavier (13–2)	Xavier (15–2)	Syracuse (17–4)	UCLA (17–4)	Butler (21–2)	Kansas (20–5)	Kansas (22–5)	Missouri (24–5)	UCLA (24–7)	Washington (25–8)	15.
16.	Marquette	Marquette (1–0) т	Xavier (5–0)	Syracuse (6–0)	UCLA (5–2)	Tennessee (6–2)	Tennessee (8–2)	Gonzaga (8–3)	Xavier (11–2)	Arizona State (14–2)	Butler (16–1)	Purdue (15–4)	Texas (15–5)	Kansas (19–4)	Xavier (21–4)	Purdue (21–6)	Washington (22–7)	Butler (26–4)	Florida State (25–9)	16.
17.	Miami (FL)	Miami (FL) (1–0)	Florida (3–0)	Villanova (6–0)	Memphis (5–1)	Ohio State (6–0)	Syracuse (11–1)	Arizona State (10–1)	Boston College (13–2)	Butler (14–1)	Arizona State (15–3)	UCLA (15–4)	Villanova (17–4)	Missouri (20–4)	Gonzaga (19–5)	Gonzaga (21–5)	Xavier (23–5)	Clemson (23–7)	Purdue (25–9)	17.
18.	USC	Florida (2–0)	Memphis (4–1)	Memphis (4–1)	Michigan State (5–2)	Villanova (10–1)	Villanova (10–1)	Louisville (8–2)	Marquette (13–2)	Minnesota (15–1)	Purdue (14–4)	Memphis (16–3)	Gonzaga (16–4)	Arizona State (18–5)	Illinois (21–5)	LSU (23–4)	Clemson (22–6)	Syracuse (23–8)	UCLA (25–8)	18.
19.	Florida	USC (1–0)	Wake Forest (2–0)	Arizona State (5–1)	Georgetown (5–1)	Michigan State (6–2)	Louisville (7–2)	Baylor (10–1)	Villanova (12–2)	Purdue (12–4)	Notre Dame (12–5)	Illinois (17–3)	Minnesota (18–3)	Gonzaga (17–5)	Purdue (19–6)	Xavier (22–5)	Purdue (22–7)	Xavier (24–6)	Arizona State (24–9)	19.
20.	Davidson	Wake Forest (1–0)	Villanova (3–0)	Georgetown (4–1)	Arizona State (7–1)	Arizona State (8–1)	Arizona State (9–1)	Clemson (12–0)	Arizona State (12–2)	Louisville (11–3)	Villanova (14–3)	Gonzaga (14–4)	Syracuse (17–5)	Purdue (17–6)	UCLA (19–6)	Illinois (22–6)	UCLA (22–7)	LSU (25–6)	Xavier (25–7)	20.
21.	Wake Forest	Davidson (1–0)	Georgetown (2–0)	Miami (FL) (4–1)	Ohio State (5–0)	Baylor (8–1)	Baylor (9–1)	Minnesota (12–0)	Butler (12–1)	Baylor (13–2)	Minnesota (16–2)	Villanova (15–4)	Kansas (17–4)	Utah State (23–1)	Butler (22–3)	Washington (20–7)	Arizona State (21–7)	Marquette (23–8)	LSU (26–7)	21.
22.	Georgetown	Georgetown (0–0)	Miami (FL) (2–1) т	Davidson (5–1)	Baylor (7–1)	Davidson (8–1)	Clemson (12–0)	Xavier (9–2)	Minnesota (13–1)	California (15–2)	Memphis (14–3)	Saint Mary's (18–1)	Washington (16–5)	Illinois (19–5)	Washington (19–6)	UCLA (20–7)	Butler (25–4)	Florida State (23–8)	Butler (26–5)	22.
23.	Villanova	Villanova (1–0)	Kansas (2–0) т	Florida (5–1)	Davidson (7–1)	Memphis (5–2)	Minnesota (10–0)	Michigan (9–2)	Baylor (12–2)	Villanova (13–3)	Gonzaga (12–4)	Washington (15–4)	Illinois (18–4)	Syracuse (18–6)	LSU (21–4)	Florida State (21–6)	Illinois (23–7)	Arizona State (22–8)	Marquette (24–9)	23.
24.	Kansas	Kansas (1–0)	Davidson (3–1)	Baylor (6–1)	Marquette (7–1)	Marquette (8–1)	Michigan (8–2)	Ohio State (9–1)	Louisville (9–3)	Tennessee (10–4)	Florida (16–2)	Kentucky (16–4)	Arizona State (16–5)	Ohio State (17–5)	Syracuse (19–7)	Butler (23–4)	Florida State (22–7)	Purdue (22–9)	Clemson (23–8)	24.
25.	Wisconsin	Wisconsin (1–0)	Wisconsin (4–0)	Marquette (5–1)	Kansas (7–1)	Clemson (10–0)	Missouri (9–1)	Butler (10–1)	West Virginia (11–2)	Michigan (13–3)	Illinois (15–3)	Georgetown (12–6)	Utah State (21–1)	Florida State (18–5)	Dayton (23–3)	Texas (18–8)	Syracuse (21–8)	BYU (24–6)	Utah (24–9)	25.
	Preseason Oct 31	Week 1 Nov 17	Week 2 Nov 24	Week 3 Dec 1	Week 4 Dec 8	Week 5 Dec 15	Week 6 Dec 22	Week 7 Dec 29	Week 8 Jan 5	Week 9 Jan 12	Week 10 Jan 19	Week 11 Jan 26	Week 12 Feb 2	Week 13 Feb 9	Week 14 Feb 16	Week 15 Feb 23	Week 16 Mar 2	Week 17 Mar 9	Week 18 Mar 16	
		None	Dropped: USC (3–2)	Dropped: Kansas (4–1); Wisconsin (5–1)	Dropped: Miami (FL) (5–2); Florida (6–2)	Dropped: Kansas (7–2)	Dropped: Davidson (8–2); Memphis (7–3); Marquette (9–2)	Dropped: Missouri (10–2)	Dropped: Gonzaga (8–4); Michigan (11–3); Ohio State (10–2)	Dropped: Boston College (13–4); West Virginia (11–4)	Dropped: Baylor (14–3); California (15–3); Tennessee (11–5); Michigan (13–5)	Dropped: Notre Dame (12–6); Minnesota (17–3); Florida (17–3)	Dropped: Saint Mary's (18–3); Kentucky (16–6); Georgetown (12–8)	Dropped: Texas (15–7); Minnesota (18–5); Washington (17–6)	Dropped: Utah State (24–2); Ohio State (17–6); Florida State (19–6)	Dropped: Syracuse (19–8); Dayton (23–4)	Dropped: Texas (19–9)	Dropped: Illinois (23–8)	Dropped: BYU (25–7)	

== ESPN/USA Today Coaches Poll ==
The Coaches Poll is the second oldest poll still in use after the AP Poll. It is compiled by a rotating group of 31 college Division I head coaches. The Poll operates by Borda count. Each voting member ranks teams from 1 to 25. Each team then receives points for their ranking in reverse order: Number 1 earns 25 points, number 2 earns 24 points, and so forth. The points are then combined and the team with the highest points is then ranked #1; second highest is ranked #2 and so forth. Only the top 25 teams with points are ranked, with teams receiving first-place votes noted in the quantity next to their name. Any team receiving votes after the top 25 is listed after the top 25 by their point totals. However, these are not real rankings: They are not considered #26, #27, etc. The maximum number of points a single team can earn is 775. The preseason poll was released on October 30, 2008.

	Preseason Oct 30	Week 1 Nov 17	Week 2 Nov 24	Week 3 Dec 1	Week 4 Dec 8	Week 5 Dec 15	Week 6 Dec 22	Week 7 Dec 29	Week 8 Jan 5	Week 9 Jan 12	Week 10 Jan 19	Week 11 Jan 26	Week 12 Feb 2	Week 13 Feb 9	Week 14 Feb 16	Week 15 Feb 23	Week 16 Mar 2	Week 17 Mar 9	Week 18 Mar 16	Week 19 Final	
1.	North Carolina (31)	North Carolina (1–0) 30	North Carolina (3–0) 31	North Carolina (7–0) 31	North Carolina (8–0) 31	North Carolina (9–0) 31	North Carolina (11–0) 31	North Carolina (12–0) 31	Pittsburgh (14–0) 30	Pittsburgh (15–0) 29	Wake Forest (16–0) 25	Duke (18–1) 30	Connecticut (20–1) 28	Connecticut (22–1) 30	Connecticut (24–1) 30	Pittsburgh (25–2) 30	Connecticut (27–2) 27	North Carolina (27–3) 23	Louisville (28–5) 14	North Carolina (34–4) 31	1.
2.	Connecticut	Connecticut (1–0) 1	Connecticut (4–0)	Connecticut (6–0)	Connecticut (8–0)	Connecticut (8–0)	Connecticut (10–0)	Connecticut (11–0)	Duke (12–1)	Duke (14–1)	Duke (16–1) 6	Connecticut (18–1) 1	Oklahoma (21–1) 3	Oklahoma (23–1) 1	Oklahoma (25–1) 1	Connecticut (25–2) 1	North Carolina (25–3)	Pittsburgh (28–3) 5	Memphis (31–3) 11	Michigan State (31–7)	2.
3.	Louisville	Louisville (0–0)	Louisville (2–0)	Pittsburgh (7–0)	Pittsburgh (9–0)	Pittsburgh (10–0)	Pittsburgh (12–0)	Pittsburgh (12–0)	North Carolina (13–1) 1	Wake Forest (14–0) 2	Connecticut (16–1)	Pittsburgh (18–1)	Duke (19–2)	North Carolina (21–2)	North Carolina (23–2)	Oklahoma (25–2)	Memphis (26–3) 4	Memphis (28–3) 3	North Carolina (28–4) 6	Connecticut (31–5)	3.
4.	UCLA	UCLA (2–0)	Pittsburgh (4–0)	Duke (7–0)	Gonzaga (6–0)	Oklahoma (10–0)	Oklahoma (11–0)	Oklahoma (12–0)	Wake Forest (13–0)	Connecticut (14–1)	Pittsburgh (16–1)	Wake Forest (16–1)	North Carolina (19–2)	Pittsburgh (21–2)	Pittsburgh (23–2)	Memphis (24–3)	Pittsburgh (26–3)	Connecticut (27–3)	Pittsburgh (28–4)	Villanova (30–8)	4.
5.	Duke	Duke (3–0)	Duke (6–0)	Gonzaga (5–0)	Oklahoma (8–0)	Texas (8–1)	Duke (10–1)	Duke (10–1)	Connecticut (12–1)	Oklahoma (15–1)	Oklahoma (17–1)	Oklahoma (19–1)	Pittsburgh (19–2)	Duke (20–3)	Michigan State (20–4)	North Carolina (24–3)	Oklahoma (26–3)	Louisville (25–5)	Duke (28–6)	Louisville (31–6)	5.
6.	Pittsburgh	Pittsburgh (1–0)	Michigan State (2–0)	Oklahoma (6–0)	Texas (6–1)	Duke (8–1)	Wake Forest (10–0)	Wake Forest (11–0)	Oklahoma (13–1)	North Carolina (14–2)	North Carolina (16–2)	North Carolina (17–2)	Wake Forest (17–2)	UCLA (19–4)	Memphis (22–3)	Louisville (21–5)	Louisville (23–5)	Michigan State (25–5)	Connecticut (27–4)	Pittsburgh (31–5)	6.
7.	Michigan State	Michigan State (1–0)	Texas (2–0)	Notre Dame (5–1)	Duke (8–1)	Gonzaga (7–1) т	Gonzaga (8–2)	Texas (10–2)	Texas (11–2) т	UCLA (13–2)	Michigan State (15–2)	Louisville (15–3)	Louisville (17–3)	Louisville (18–4)	Louisville (19–5)	Duke (22–5)	Duke (24–5)	Oklahoma (27–4)	Michigan State (26–6)	Oklahoma (30–6)	7.
8.	Texas	Texas (1–0)	Notre Dame (2–0)	Texas (5–1)	Tennessee (6–1)	Xavier (9–0) т	Texas (9–2)	Georgetown (9–1)	UCLA (12–2) т	Syracuse (16–1)	Syracuse (17–2)	Marquette (17–2)	Marquette (19–2)	Wake Forest (18–3)	Wake Forest (19–4)	Missouri (23–4)	Michigan State (23–5)	Duke (25–6)	Oklahoma (27–5)	Missouri (31–7)	8.
9.	Notre Dame	Notre Dame (1–0)	Purdue (4–0)	UCLA (4–1)	Xavier (7–0)	Louisville (6–1)	Georgetown (8–1)	UCLA (10–2)	Syracuse (14–1)	Clemson (16–0)	Clemson (16–1)	Michigan State (16–3)	Xavier (19–2)	Michigan State (19–4)	Duke (20–5)	Michigan State (21–5)	Kansas (24–5)	Wake Forest (24–5)	Missouri (28–6)	Memphis (33–4)	9.
10.	Purdue	Purdue (1–0)	Gonzaga (2–0)	Purdue (5–1)	Louisville (4–1)	Wake Forest (9–0)	UCLA (8–2)	Notre Dame (9–2)	Georgetown (10–2)	Michigan State (13–2)	Marquette (16–2)	Xavier (17–2)	Clemson (18–2)	Memphis (20–3)	Missouri (22–4)	Marquette (23–4)	Wake Forest (22–5)	Washington (24–7)	Gonzaga (26–5)	Kansas (27–8)	10.
11.	Gonzaga	Gonzaga (1–0)	UCLA (3–1)	Louisville (2–1)	Wake Forest (8–0)	Syracuse (9–0)	Notre Dame (8–2)	Purdue (11–2) т	Clemson (14–0)	Texas (12–3)	UCLA (14–3)	Clemson (17–2)	Butler (19–1)	Clemson (19–3)	Marquette (21–4) т	Arizona State (21–5)	LSU (25–4)	Kansas (25–6)	Wake Forest (24–6)	Duke (30–7)	11.
12.	Memphis	Memphis (1–0)	Tennessee (3–0)	Michigan State (4–1)	Villanova (8–0)	UCLA (6–2)	Xavier (9–1)	Syracuse (12–1) т	Michigan State (11–2)	Georgetown (11–3)	Louisville (13–3)	Texas (14–4)	UCLA (17–4)	Marquette (20–3)	Arizona State (20–5) т	Villanova (22–5)	Missouri (24–5)	Gonzaga (25–5)	Villanova (26–7)	Syracuse (28-10)	12.
13.	Tennessee	Tennessee (1–0)	Oklahoma (4–0)	Tennessee (5–1)	Notre Dame (6–2)	Georgetown (7–1)	Ohio State (8–0)	Villanova (11–1)	Notre Dame (10–3)	Notre Dame (12–3)	Xavier (15–2)	Butler (18–1)	Purdue (17–4)	Villanova (19–4)	Clemson (20–4)	Clemson (22–4)	Washington (22–7)	Villanova (25–6)	Kansas (25–7)	Gonzaga (28–6)	13.
14.	Oklahoma	Oklahoma (1–0)	Arizona State (3–0)	Xavier (6–0)	UCLA (5–2)	Notre Dame (7–2)	Syracuse (11–1)	Arizona State (10–1)	Purdue (11–3)	Marquette (15–2)	Georgetown (12–4)	Arizona State (16–3)	Michigan State (17–4)	Xavier (20–3)	Villanova (20–5)	Wake Forest (20–5)	Gonzaga (23–5)	UCLA (24–7)	Washington (25–8)	Purdue (27-10)	14.
15.	Arizona State	Arizona State (1–0)	Marquette (3–0)	Memphis (4–1)	Memphis (5–1)	Villanova (10–1)	Purdue (9–2)	Michigan State (9–2)	Marquette (13–2)	Arizona State (14–2)	Texas (13–4)	Syracuse (17–4)	Memphis (18–3)	Butler (21–2)	UCLA (19–6)	Kansas (22–5)	Marquette (23–6)	Missouri (25–6)	Syracuse (26–9)	Xavier (27–8)	15.
16.	Miami (FL)	Miami (FL) (1–0)	Georgetown (2–0)	Villanova (6–0)	Syracuse (8–0)	Ohio State (6–0)	Villanova (10–1)	Clemson (12–0)	Arizona State (12–2)	Xavier (13–2)	Arizona State (15–3)	UCLA (15–4)	Villanova (17–4)	Kansas (19–4)	Illinois (21–5)	Purdue (21–6)	Villanova (23–6)	LSU (25–6)	Florida State (25–9)	Washington (26–9)	16.
17.	Marquette	Marquette (1–0)	Memphis (4–1)	Wake Forest (6–0)	Purdue (6–2)	Arizona State (8–1)	Arizona State (9–1)	Gonzaga (8–3)	Villanova (12–2)	Minnesota (15–1)	Butler (16–1)	Purdue (15–4)	Texas (15–5)	Utah State (23–1)	Xavier (21–4)	Gonzaga (21–5)	UCLA (22–7)	Butler (26–4)	UCLA (25–8)	LSU (27–8)	17.
18.	Georgetown	Georgetown (0–0)	Florida (3–0)	Georgetown (4–1)	Arizona State (7–1)	Purdue (8–2)	Michigan State (8–2)	Louisville (8–2) т	Xavier (11–2)	Butler (14–1)	Purdue (14–4)	Saint Mary's (18–1)	Gonzaga (16–4)	Arizona State (18–5)	Kansas (20–5)	LSU (23–4)	Xavier (23–5)	Clemson (23–7)	Purdue (25–9)	UCLA (26–9)	18.
19.	Florida	Florida (2–0)	Wisconsin (4–0)	Arizona State (5–1)	Georgetown (5–1)	Tennessee (6–2)	Louisville (7–2)	Tennessee (8–2) т	Minnesota (13–1)	Purdue (12–4)	Notre Dame (12–5)	Memphis (16–3)	Minnesota (18–3)	Missouri (20–4)	Washington (19–6)	UCLA (20–7)	Clemson (22–6)	Xavier (24–6)	Arizona State (24–9)	Arizona State (25-10)	19.
20.	Davidson	USC (1–0)	Xavier (5–0)	Syracuse (6–0)	Michigan State (5–2)	Davidson (8–1)	Clemson (12–0)	Baylor (10–1)	Butler (12–1)	Louisville (11–3)	Minnesota (16–2)	Illinois (17–3)	Syracuse (17–5)	Illinois (19–5)	Gonzaga (19–5)	Illinois (22–6)	Purdue (22–7)	Syracuse (23–8)	LSU (26–7)	Wake Forest (24–7)	20.
21.	USC т	Davidson (1–0)	Miami (FL) (2–1)	Florida (5–1)	Ohio State (5–0)	Memphis (5–2)	Tennessee (8–2)	Minnesota (12–0)	Louisville (9–3)	Baylor (13–2)	Villanova (14–3)	Villanova (15–4)	Illinois (18–4)	Gonzaga (17–5)	Purdue (19–6)	Washington (20–7)	Arizona State (21–7)	Marquette (23–8)	Clemson (23–8)	Marquette (25-10)	21.
22.	Wisconsin т	Wisconsin (1–0)	Villanova (3–0)	Miami (FL) (4–1) т	Davidson (6–1)	Michigan State (6–2)	Baylor (9–1)	Xavier (9–2)	West Virginia (11–2)	Villanova (13–3)	Saint Mary's (17–1)	Notre Dame (12–6)	Utah State (21–1)	Syracuse (18–6)	Butler (22–3)	Xavier (22–5)	Butler (25–4)	Florida State (23–8)	Xavier (25–7)	Florida State (25-10)	22.
23.	Kansas	Villanova (1–0)	Kansas (2–0)	Wisconsin (5–1) т	Kansas (7–1)	Marquette (8–1)	Minnesota (10–0)	Ohio State (9–1)	Baylor (12–2)	California (15–2)	Baylor (14–3)	Georgetown (12–6)	Arizona State (16–5)	Purdue (17–6)	Utah State (24–2)	Butler (23–4)	Illinois (23–7)	Arizona State (22–8)	Butler (26–5)	Texas (23-12)	23.
24.	Wake Forest	Kansas (1–0)	Wake Forest (2–0)	Davidson (5–1)	Marquette (7–1)	Baylor (8–1)	Memphis (6–3)	Michigan (9–2)	Boston College (13–2)	Michigan (13–3)	Illinois (15–3) т	Minnesota (17–3)	Kansas (17–4)	Washington (17–6)	LSU (21–4)	Texas (18–8)	Florida State (22–7)	Purdue (22–9)	Marquette (24–9)	Arizona (21-14)	24.
25.	Villanova	Wake Forest (1–0)	Davidson (3–1)	Kansas (4–1)	Miami (FL) (5–2)	Clemson (10–0)	Marquette (9–2)	Marquette (11–2)	Tennessee (9–3)	Saint Mary's (15–1)	Memphis (14–3) т	Gonzaga (14–4)	Washington (16–5)	Florida State (18–5)	Syracuse (19–7)	Florida State (21–6)	Syracuse (21–8)	Illinois (23–8)	Utah State (30–4)	Butler (26–6)	25.
	Preseason Oct 30	Week 1 Nov 17	Week 2 Nov 24	Week 3 Dec 1	Week 4 Dec 8	Week 5 Dec 15	Week 6 Dec 22	Week 7 Dec 29	Week 8 Jan 5	Week 9 Jan 12	Week 10 Jan 19	Week 11 Jan 26	Week 12 Feb 2	Week 13 Feb 9	Week 14 Feb 16	Week 15 Feb 23	Week 16 Mar 2	Week 17 Mar 9	Week 18 Mar 16	Week 19 Final	
		None	Dropped: USC (3–2)	Dropped: Marquette (5–1)	Dropped: Florida (6–2); Wisconsin (6–2)	Dropped: Kansas (7–2); Miami (FL) (7–2)	Dropped: Davidson (8–2)	Dropped: Memphis (7–3)	Dropped: Gonzaga (8–4); Ohio State (10–2); Michigan (11–3)	Dropped: West Virginia (11–4); Boston College (13–4); Tennessee (10–4)	Dropped: California (15–3); Michigan (13–5)	Dropped: Baylor (15–4)	Dropped: Saint Mary's (18–3); Notre Dame (12–8); Georgetown (12–8)	Dropped: Texas (15–7); Minnesota (18–5)	Dropped: Florida State (19–6)	Dropped: Utah State (25–3); Syracuse (19–8)	Dropped: Texas (19–9)	None	Dropped: Illinois (24–9)	Dropped: Clemson (23–9); Utah State (30–5)	
