= 2008–09 Florida State Seminoles men's basketball team =

American college basketball season

2008–09 Florida State Seminoles men's basketball

NCAA tournament, Round of 64
- Conference: Atlantic Coast Conference

Ranking
- Coaches: No. 22
- AP: No. 16
- Record: 25–10 (10–6 ACC)
- Head coach: Leonard Hamilton (7th season)
- Assistant coaches: Stan Jones; Andy Enfield; Corey Williams
- Home arena: Donald L. Tucker Center (Capacity: 12,100)

2008–09 ACC men's basketball standings
	Conf.				Overall
Team	W		L	PCT	W		L	PCT
No. 2 North Carolina	13	–	3	.813	34	–	4	.895
No. 6 Duke†	11	–	5	.688	30	–	7	.811
No. 12 Wake Forest	11	–	5	.688	24	–	7	.774
No. 16 Florida State	10	–	6	.625	25	–	10	.714
No. 24 Clemson	9	–	7	.563	23	–	9	.719
Boston College	9	–	7	.563	22	–	12	.647
Maryland	7	–	9	.438	21	–	14	.600
Virginia Tech	7	–	9	.438	19	–	15	.559
Miami (FL)	7	–	9	.438	19	–	13	.594
NC State	6	–	10	.375	16	–	14	.533
Virginia	4	–	12	.250	10	–	18	.357
Georgia Tech	2	–	14	.125	12	–	19	.387
† 2009 ACC tournament winner Rankings from AP Poll

The 2008–09 Florida State Seminoles men's basketball team represented Florida State University in the 2008–2009 NCAA Division I basketball season. The Seminoles were coached by Leonard Hamilton and played their home games at the Donald L. Tucker Center in Tallahassee, Florida. The Seminoles were a member of the Atlantic Coast Conference.

The Seminoles finished the season 25–10, 10–6 in ACC play. They lost in the quarterfinals of the 2009 ACC men's basketball tournament. They received an at-large bid to the 2009 NCAA Division I men's basketball tournament, earning the No. 5 seed in the East Region, where they lost to No. 12 seed Wisconsin in the first round.

== Roster ==
2008–09 Florida State Seminoles men's basketball team
Players
Coaches

Pos.	#	Name	Height	Weight	Year	Hometown
F	1	Xavier Gibson	6 ft 11 in (2.11 m)	248 lb (112 kg)	Fr	Dothan, Alabama
G	3	Luke Loucks	6 ft 5 in (1.96 m)	201 lb (91 kg)	Fr	Clearwater, Florida
G	4	Deividas Dulkys	6 ft 5 in (1.96 m)	196 lb (89 kg)	Fr
G	22	Derwin Kitchen	6 ft 4 in (1.93 m)	204 lb (93 kg)	So	Jacksonville, Florida
G	23	Toney Douglas	6 ft 1 in (1.85 m)	205 lb (93 kg)	Sr	Jonesboro, Georgia
F	31	Chris Singleton	6 ft 9 in (2.06 m)	220 lb (100 kg)	Fr	Canton, Georgia
C	32	Solomon Alabi	7 ft 1 in (2.16 m)	251 lb (114 kg)	So
F	41	Uche Echefu	6 ft 9 in (2.06 m)	225 lb (102 kg)	Sr
F	42	Ryan Reid	6 ft 8 in (2.03 m)	235 lb (107 kg)	Jr	Lauderdale Lakes, Florida

Head coach

- Leonard Hamilton

Assistant coach(es)

Legend

- (C) Team captain
- (S) Suspended
- (I) Ineligible
- (W) Walk-on
- Injured
- Current redshirt

Roster

== Schedule and results ==
Date time, TV	Rank^{#}	Opponent^{#}	Result	Record	Site (attendance) city, state
Regular season
Nov 15, 2008*		at Jacksonville	W 59–57	1–0	Jacksonville Veterans Memorial Arena; Jacksonville, Florida
Nov 18, 2008*		at La Salle	W 65–61	2–0	Tom Gola Arena; Philadelphia, Pennsylvania
Nov 20, 2008*		Stetson	W 79–77	3–0	Donald L. Tucker Center; Tallahassee, Florida
Nov 22, 2008*		Coastal Carolina; Global Sports Classic	W 82–70	4–0	Donald L. Tucker Center; Tallahassee, Florida
Nov 24, 2008*		Western Illinois; Global Sports Classic	W 67–55	5–0	Donald L. Tucker Center; Tallahassee, Florida
Nov 28, 2008*		vs. Cincinnati; Global Sports Classic	W 58–47	6–0	Thomas & Mack Center; Paradise, Nevada
Nov 29, 2008*		vs. California; Global Sports Classic	W 80–77	7–0	Thomas & Mack Center; Paradise, Nevada
Dec 3, 2008*; ESPN2		at Northwestern	L 59–73	7–1	Welsh-Ryan Arena; Evanston, Illinois
Dec 7, 2008*		No. 23 Florida	W 57–55	8–1	Donald L. Tucker Center; Tallahassee, Florida
Dec 13, 2008*		at Georgia State	W 62–57	9–1	GSU Sports Arena; Atlanta, Georgia
Dec 16, 2008*		Tennessee Tech	W 69–59	10–1	Donald L. Tucker Center; Tallahassee, Florida
Dec 18, 2008*		Charleston Southern	W 71–48	11–1	Donald L. Tucker Center; Tallahassee, Florida
Dec 21, 2008*		No. 3 Pittsburgh	L 48–56	11–2	Donald L. Tucker Center; Tallahassee, Florida
Dec 28, 2008*		vs. Western Kentucky; Orange Bowl Basketball Classic	W 82–69	12–2	BankAtlantic Center; Sunrise, Florida
Jan 3, 2009*		Texas A&M	W 69–48	13–2	Donald L. Tucker Center; Tallahassee, Florida
Jan 10, 2009		No. 2 Duke	L 58–66	13–3 (0–1)	Donald L. Tucker Center; Tallahassee, Florida
Jan 13, 2009		at NC State	W 78–65	14–3 (1–1)	RBC Center; Raleigh, North Carolina
Jan 17, 2009		Maryland	W 76–73 ^{OT}	15–3 (2–1)	Donald L. Tucker Center; Tallahassee, Florida
Jan 21, 2009		at Miami (FL)	L 69–75	15–4 (2–2)	BankUnited Center; Miami, Florida
Jan 24, 2009		at Virginia	W 73–62	16–4 (3–2)	John Paul Jones Arena; Charlottesville, Virginia
Jan 28, 2009		No. 5 North Carolina	L 77–80	16–5 (3–3)	Donald L. Tucker Center; Tallahassee, Florida
Feb 5, 2009		Georgia Tech	W 62–58	17–5 (4–3)	Donald L. Tucker Center; Tallahassee, Florida
Feb 7, 2009		at No. 10 Clemson	W 65–61	18–5 (5–3)	Littlejohn Coliseum; Clemson, South Carolina
Feb 10, 2009	No. 25	Virginia	W 68–57	19–5 (6–3)	Donald L. Tucker Center; Tallahassee, Florida
Feb 14, 2009	No. 25	at No. 7 Wake Forest	L 63–86	19–6 (6–4)	Lawrence Joel Coliseum; Winston-Salem, North Carolina
Feb 18, 2009		Miami (FL)	W 80–67	20–6 (7–4)	Donald L. Tucker Center; Tallahassee, Florida
Feb 21, 2009		at Virginia Tech	W 67–65	21–6 (8–4)	Cassell Coliseum; Blacksburg, Virginia
Feb 24, 2009	No. 23	at Boston College	L 67–72	21–7 (8–5)	Silvio O. Conte Forum; Boston, Massachusetts
Feb 28, 2009	No. 23	No. 12 Clemson	W 73–66	22–7 (9–5)	Donald L. Tucker Center; Tallahassee, Florida
Mar 3, 2009	No. 24	at No. 7 Duke	L 81–84	22–8 (9–6)	Cameron Indoor Stadium; Durham, North Carolina
Mar 8, 2009	No. 24	Virginia Tech	W 63–53	23–8 (10–6)	Donald L. Tucker Center; Tallahassee, Florida
ACC tournament
Mar 13, 2009*	No. 22	at Georgia Tech; Quarterfinals	W 64–62	24–8	Georgia Dome; Atlanta, Georgia
Mar 14, 2009*	No. 22	vs. No. 1 North Carolina; Semifinals	W 73–70	25–8	Georgia Dome; Atlanta, Georgia
Mar 15, 2009*	No. 22	vs. No. 9 Duke; Championship Game	L 69–79	25–9	Georgia Dome; Atlanta, Georgia
NCAA tournament
Mar 20, 2009*	(5 E) No. 16	vs. (12 E) Wisconsin; First Round	L 59–61 ^{OT}	25–10	Taco Bell Arena; Boise, Idaho
*Non-conference game. ^{#}Rankings from AP poll. (#) Tournament seedings in parentheses. E=East.
