= 2009 ACC men's basketball tournament =

- 2009 ACC Tournament logo
- Classification: Division I
- Season: 2008–09
- Teams: 12
- Site: Georgia Dome; Atlanta, Georgia
- Champions: Duke (17th title)
- Winning coach: Mike Krzyzewski (11th title)
- MVP: Jon Scheyer (Duke)
- Television: ESPN, Raycom Sports

2008–09 ACC men's basketball standings
	Conf.				Overall
Team	W		L	PCT	W		L	PCT
No. 2 North Carolina	13	–	3	.813	34	–	4	.895
No. 6 Duke†	11	–	5	.688	30	–	7	.811
No. 12 Wake Forest	11	–	5	.688	24	–	7	.774
No. 16 Florida State	10	–	6	.625	25	–	10	.714
No. 24 Clemson	9	–	7	.563	23	–	9	.719
Boston College	9	–	7	.563	22	–	12	.647
Maryland	7	–	9	.438	21	–	14	.600
Virginia Tech	7	–	9	.438	19	–	15	.559
Miami (FL)	7	–	9	.438	19	–	13	.594
NC State	6	–	10	.375	16	–	14	.533
Virginia	4	–	12	.250	10	–	18	.357
Georgia Tech	2	–	14	.125	12	–	19	.387
† 2009 ACC tournament winner Rankings from AP Poll

The 2009 Atlantic Coast Conference men's basketball tournament took place from March 12 to 15 at the Georgia Dome in Atlanta. The tournament was broadcast on the ESPN family of networks, along with Raycom Sports in the ACC footprint.

The championship game matched Duke against Florida State, who made their first appearance in the ACC championship game since joining the league in 1992. Duke won 79–69 for their 8th conference title in 11 years.

== Schedule ==
Session	Game	Time	Matchup^{#}	Television	Attendance
First Round - Thursday, March 12
1	1	Noon	#8 Virginia Tech vs #9 Miami	Raycom	26,352
1	2	2:00PM	#5 Clemson vs #12 Georgia Tech	Raycom	26,352
2	3	7:00PM	#7 Maryland vs #10 NC State	Raycom/ESPN2	26,352
2	4	9:00PM	#6 Boston College vs #11 Virginia	Raycom	26,352
Quarterfinals - Friday, March 13
3	5	Noon	#1 North Carolina vs #8 Virginia Tech	Raycom/ESPN2	
3	6	2:00PM	#4 Florida State vs #12 Georgia Tech	Raycom/ESPN2	
4	7	7:00PM	#2 Wake Forest vs #7 Maryland	Raycom/ESPN2	
4	8	9:00PM	#3 Duke vs #6 Boston College	Raycom/ESPN2	
Semifinals - Saturday, March 14
5	9	1:30PM	#1 North Carolina vs #4 Florida State	Raycom/ESPN	
5	10	4:00PM	#7 Maryland vs #3 Duke	Raycom/ESPN	
Championship Game - Sunday, March 15
6	11	1:00PM	#4 Florida State vs #3 Duke	Raycom/ESPN	
Game Times in EDT. #-Rankings denote tournament seeding.

== Seeding ==
Teams were seeded based on the final regular-season standings, with ties broken under an ACC policy.

Wake Forest and Duke split their regular-season games, each winning one. Wake Forest was awarded the second seed for its better record against top-seeded North Carolina: Wake won its only game, while Duke lost both games.

By finishing fourth in the conference, Florida State joined North Carolina, Duke and Wake Forest as teams that received a first-round bye in the tournament. It was the first time that the Seminoles had earned a bye since joining the conference in time for the 1991–92 season.

Clemson received the fifth seed because it beat Boston College in their only meeting.

The three-way tie among Maryland, Virginia Tech, and Miami was broken based on the record of games played among the three teams. Maryland received the seventh seed for having the best winning percentage (2–1), Virginia Tech received the eighth seed (1–1), and Miami received the ninth seed (1–2).

== Bracket ==
First round Thursday, March 12, 2009
8	Virginia Tech
9	Miami
5	Clemson
12	Georgia Tech
7	Maryland
10	NC State
6	Boston College
11	Virginia

Quarterfinals; Friday, March 13, 2009
1	UNC
4	Florida State
2	Wake Forest
3	Duke

Semifinals; Saturday, March 14, 2009

ACC Championship Game; Sunday, March 15, 2009

== Awards and honors ==
Tournament MVP

- Jon Scheyer - Duke

All-Tournament Team

First Team

- Jon Scheyer - Duke
- Toney Douglas - Florida State
- Kyle Singler - Duke
- Tyler Hansbrough - North Carolina
- Gerald Henderson - Duke

Second Team

- Solomon Alabi - Florida State
- Wayne Ellington - North Carolina
- Eric Hayes - Maryland
- Greivis Vasquez - Maryland
- Lewis Clinch - Georgia Tech
