= 2008–09 Virginia Cavaliers men's basketball team =

American college basketball season

2008–09 Virginia Cavaliers men's basketball
- Conference: Atlantic Coast Conference
- Record: 10–18 (4–12 ACC)
- Head coach: Dave Leitao (4th season)
- Assistant coaches: Bill Courtney (4th season); Steve Seymour (4th season); Drew Diener (2nd season)
- Home arena: John Paul Jones Arena

2008–09 ACC men's basketball standings
	Conf.				Overall
Team	W		L	PCT	W		L	PCT
No. 2 North Carolina	13	–	3	.813	34	–	4	.895
No. 6 Duke†	11	–	5	.688	30	–	7	.811
No. 12 Wake Forest	11	–	5	.688	24	–	7	.774
No. 16 Florida State	10	–	6	.625	25	–	10	.714
No. 24 Clemson	9	–	7	.563	23	–	9	.719
Boston College	9	–	7	.563	22	–	12	.647
Maryland	7	–	9	.438	21	–	14	.600
Virginia Tech	7	–	9	.438	19	–	15	.559
Miami (FL)	7	–	9	.438	19	–	13	.594
NC State	6	–	10	.375	16	–	14	.533
Virginia	4	–	12	.250	10	–	18	.357
Georgia Tech	2	–	14	.125	12	–	19	.387
† 2009 ACC tournament winner Rankings from AP Poll

The 2008–09 Virginia Cavaliers men's basketball team represented the University of Virginia during the 2008–09 NCAA Division I men's basketball season. The team was led by fourth-year head coach Dave Leitao, and played their home games at John Paul Jones Arena in Charlottesville, Virginia as members of the Atlantic Coast Conference.

The Cavaliers were picked to finish last in the conference this season in the pre-season media poll. While they only finished 11th, ahead of Georgia Tech, their record of 10–18 and 4–12 in conference was the worst the team had received in over forty years. At the end of the season, head coach Dave Leitao resigned. On April 1, 2009, Washington State head coach Tony Bennett was announced as his replacement.

== Last season ==
The Cavaliers had a record of 17–16, with a conference record of 5–11.

== Roster ==
2008–09 Virginia Cavaliers men's basketball team
Players
Coaches

Pos.	#	Name	Height	Weight	Year	Previous school	Hometown
G	2	Mustapha Farrakhan, Jr.	6 ft 4 in (1.93 m)	175 lb (79 kg)	So	Thornton Township	Harvey, Illinois
G	4	Calvin Baker (C)	6 ft 2 in (1.88 m)	186 lb (84 kg)	RS Jr	Woodside/William & Mary	Newport News, Virginia
C	5	Assene Sene	7 ft 0 in (2.13 m)	226 lb (103 kg)	Fr	South Kent	Saint-Louis, Senegal
F	12	Jamil Tucker	6 ft 9 in (2.06 m)	241 lb (109 kg)	Jr	West Side	Gary, Indiana
G	13	Sammy Zeglinski	6 ft 0 in (1.83 m)	175 lb (79 kg)	Fr	William Penn Charter School	Philadelphia
G	15	Sylven Landesberg	6 ft 6 in (1.98 m)	209 lb (95 kg)	Fr	Holy Cross	Flushing, New York
G	21	Tunji Soroye (C)	6 ft 11 in (2.11 m)	252 lb (114 kg)	Sr	Montrose Christian	Dugbe Ibadan, Nigeria
F	22	Will Sherrill	6 ft 9 in (2.06 m)	215 lb (98 kg)	So	Phillips Academy Andover	New York, N.Y.
G	23	Jeff Jones	6 ft 4 in (1.93 m)	193 lb (88 kg)	So	Monsignor Bonner	Chester, Pennsylvania
G/F	24	Mamadi Diane (C)	6 ft 5 in (1.96 m)	201 lb (91 kg)	Sr	DeMatha Catholic	Potomac, Maryland
C	25	John Brandenberg	6 ft 11 in (2.11 m)	225 lb (102 kg)	Fr	De Smet Jesuit	Des Peres, Missouri
F	32	Mike Scott	6 ft 8 in (2.03 m)	233 lb (106 kg)	So	Deep Creek/Hargrave Military	Chesapeake, Virginia
G/F	45	Solomon Tat	6 ft 5 in (1.96 m)	223 lb (101 kg)	Jr	Community Christian School	Jos Plateau, Nigeria
F/C	55	Jerome Meyinsse	6 ft 9 in (2.06 m)	245 lb (111 kg)	Jr	McKinley	Baton Rouge, Louisiana

Head coach

- Dave Leitao (Northeastern)

Assistant coach(es)

- Bill Courtney (Bucknell)
- Steve Seymour (Bridgewater (MA))
- Drew Diener (St. Louis)

Legend

- (C) Team captain
- (S) Suspended
- (I) Ineligible
- (W) Walk-on
- Injured
- Current redshirt

Roster
Last update: 13 December 2014

== Schedule ==
Date time, TV	Opponent	Result	Record	Site (attendance) city, state
Exhibition game
Nov. 9*; 2:00 pm	Shepherd	W 87–52		John Paul Jones Arena; Charlottesville, Virginia
Regular season
Nov. 16*; 4:00 pm, CSN	VMI	W 107–97	1–0	John Paul Jones Arena (9,955); Charlottesville, Virginia
Nov. 19*; 7:00 pm	South Florida	W 77–75	2–0	John Paul Jones Arena (8,810); Charlottesville, Virginia
Nov. 21*; 7:00 pm	Radford	W 68–66	3–0	John Paul Jones Arena (10,311); Charlottesville, Virginia
Nov. 25*; 7:00 pm	Liberty	L 82–86	3–1	John Paul Jones Arena (9,263); Charlottesville, Virginia
Nov. 28*; 7:00 pm	at Syracuse	L 70–73	3–2	Carrier Dome (22,096); Syracuse, New York
Dec. 2*; 9:30 pm, ESPN2	at Minnesota; ACC/Big Ten Challenge	L 56–66	3–3	Williams Arena (12,424); Minneapolis, Minnesota
Dec. 17*; 7:00 pm	Longwood	W 90–61	4–3	John Paul Jones Arena (8,543); Charlottesville, Virginia
Dec. 20*; 4:00 pm, CSN	Auburn	L 56–58	4–4	John Paul Jones Arena (11,070); Charlottesville, Virginia
Dec. 23*; 7:00 pm	Hampton	W 74–48	5–4	John Paul Jones Arena (9,158); Charlottesville, Virginia
Dec. 28; 5:30 pm, FSN	at Georgia Tech	W 88–84 ^{OT}	6–4 (1–0)	Alexander Memorial Coliseum (7,230); Atlanta, Georgia
Jan. 3*; 2:00 pm, CSN	No. 22 Xavier	L 70–84	6–5	John Paul Jones Arena (10,174); Charlottesville, Virginia
Jan. 6*; 7:00 pm	Brown	W 74–50	7–5	John Paul Jones Arena (8,357); Charlottesville, Virginia
Jan. 10; 4:00 pm, RSN	at Virginia Tech	L 75–78	7–6 (1–1)	Cassell Coliseum (9,847); Blacksburg, Virginia
Jan. 15; 9:00 pm, ESPN	No. 5 North Carolina	L 61–83	7–7 (1–2)	John Paul Jones Arena (13,811); Charlottesville, Virginia
Jan. 20; 8:00 pm, Raycom	at Maryland	L 78–84	7–8 (1–3)	Comcast Center (16,205); College Park, Maryland
Jan. 24; 4:00 pm, RSN	Florida State	L 62–73	7–9 (1–4)	John Paul Jones Arena (10,981); Charlottesville, Virginia
Feb. 1; 2:00 pm, FSN	at No. 1 Duke	L 54–79	7–10 (1–5)	Cameron Indoor Stadium (9,314); Durham, North Carolina
Feb. 4; 7:00 pm, ESPNU	Boston College	L 70–80	7–11 (1–6)	John Paul Jones Arena (9,631); Charlottesville, Virginia
Feb. 7; 4:00 pm, Raycom	at No. 3 North Carolina	L 61–76	7–12 (1–7)	Dean Smith Center (20,879); Chapel Hill, North Carolina
Feb. 10; 7:00 pm, RSN	at No. 25 Florida State	L 57–68	7–13 (1–8)	Donald L. Tucker Center (7,921); Tallahassee, Florida
Feb. 15; 1:00 pm, Raycom	No. 12 Clemson	W 85–81 ^{OT}	8–13 (2–8)	John Paul Jones Arena (10,971); Charlottesville, Virginia
Feb. 18; 8:00 pm, Raycom	Virginia Tech	W 75–61	9–13 (3–8)	John Paul Jones Arena (11,174); Charlottesville, Virginia
Feb. 21; 1:00 pm, Raycom	at NC State	L 67–72	9–14 (3–9)	PNC Arena (16,353); Raleigh, North Carolina
Feb. 26; 8:00 pm, Raycom	Miami	L 55–62	9–15 (3–10)	John Paul Jones Arena (9,392); Charlottesville, Virginia
Feb. 28; 2:00 pm, Raycom	No. 13 Wake Forest	L 60–70	9–16 (3–11)	John Paul Jones Arena (11,065); Charlottesville, Virginia
Mar. 3; 7:00 pm, RSN	at No. 18 Clemson	L 57–75	9–17 (3–12)	Littlejohn Coliseum (8,150); Clemson, South Carolina
Mar. 7; 3:30 pm, ABC	Maryland	W 68–63	10–17 (4–12)	John Paul Jones Arena (11,050); Charlottesville, Virginia
ACC Tournament
Mar. 12; 9:30 pm, Raycom	vs. Boston College; ACC Tournament first round	L 63–76	10–18	Georgia Dome (26,352); Atlanta
*Non-conference game. (#) Tournament seedings in parentheses. All times are in Eastern Time..
