= 2008 Maui Invitational =

The 2008 Maui Invitational Tournament, an annual early-season college basketball tournament held in Lahaina, Hawaii, was held November 20–22 at Lahaina Civic Center. The winning team was North Carolina.

== Bracket ==
Fifth Place Game; November 22
Alabama	58
Saint Joseph's	48
Seventh Place Game
Chaminade	79
Indiana	81

Consolation 2nd Round; November 21
Chaminade	56
Alabama	78
Saint Joseph's	80
Indiana	54

First round November 20
1	North Carolina	115
Chaminade	70
Oregon	92
Alabama	69
Saint Joseph's	50
6	Texas	68
Indiana	61
8	Notre Dame	88

Semifinals; November 21
1	North Carolina	98
Oregon	69
6	Texas	80
8	Notre Dame	81

Championship; November 22
1	North Carolina	102
8	Notre Dame	87
Third-place game
6	Texas	70
Oregon	57
