= 2008–09 Wake Forest Demon Deacons men's basketball team =

American college basketball season

2008–09 Wake Forest Demon Deacons men's basketball

2008 Anaheim Classic Champions

NCAA tournament, first round
- Conference: Atlantic Coast Conference

Ranking
- Coaches: No. 20
- AP: No. 12
- Record: 24–7 (11–5 ACC)
- Head coach: Dino Gaudio
- Assistant coaches: Jeff Battle; Pat Kelsey; Mike Muse
- Home arena: LJVM Coliseum

2008–09 ACC men's basketball standings
	Conf.				Overall
Team	W		L	PCT	W		L	PCT
No. 2 North Carolina	13	–	3	.813	34	–	4	.895
No. 6 Duke†	11	–	5	.688	30	–	7	.811
No. 12 Wake Forest	11	–	5	.688	24	–	7	.774
No. 16 Florida State	10	–	6	.625	25	–	10	.714
No. 24 Clemson	9	–	7	.563	23	–	9	.719
Boston College	9	–	7	.563	22	–	12	.647
Maryland	7	–	9	.438	21	–	14	.600
Virginia Tech	7	–	9	.438	19	–	15	.559
Miami (FL)	7	–	9	.438	19	–	13	.594
NC State	6	–	10	.375	16	–	14	.533
Virginia	4	–	12	.250	10	–	18	.357
Georgia Tech	2	–	14	.125	12	–	19	.387
† 2009 ACC tournament winner Rankings from AP Poll

The 2008–09 Wake Forest Demon Deacons men's basketball team represented Wake Forest University in the 2008–09 NCAA Division I men's basketball season. The team's head coach was Dino Gaudio. The team played its home games in the Lawrence Joel Veterans Memorial Coliseum in Winston-Salem, North Carolina, and was a member of the Atlantic Coast Conference (ACC).

On January 19, the Deacons took the top spot in both the ESPN/USA Today coaches poll and the Associated Press poll, making it the second time in program history a Wake Forest team was number one in the country.

Wake Forest finished the regular season with a record of 24–5, and 11–5 in the ACC, which tied them with Duke. The Demon Deacons received the number two seed in the 2009 ACC men's basketball tournament in a tiebreaker over Duke because of their victory against number one seed North Carolina.

== Preseason ==
In the preseason ESPN/USA Today Coaches Poll the Demon Deacons were ranked #24.

== Roster ==
#	Name	Position	Height	Class	Hometown	Last School
1	Al-Farouq Aminu	Forward	6'9"	Freshman	Norcross, Georgia	Norcross
30	Brett Bitove	Guard	6'3"	Freshman	Toronto, Ontario	Benjamin School (FL)
2	Gary Clark	Guard	6'4"	Sophomore	Sarasota, Florida	Montverde Academy
35	Ben Davis	Guard	6'3"	Sophomore	St. Louis, Missouri	Westminster Christian Academy
41	Brooks Godwin	Forward	6'5"	Freshman	Winston-Salem, North Carolina	Mount Tabor
4	Harvey Hale	Guard	6'3"	Senior	Albuquerque, New Mexico	Rio Grande
52	Bobby Hoekstra	Forward	6'7"	Senior	Lewisville, North Carolina	Forsyth Country Day School
23	James Johnson	Forward	6'9"	Sophomore	Cheyenne, Wyoming	Cheyenne East
20	Mike Lepore	Guard	6'1"	Senior	Flemington, New Jersey	Lawrenceville Prep
13	Chas McFarland	Center	7'0"	Junior	Lovington, Illinois	Worcester Academy
25	Jimmy McQuilkin	Guard	5'10"	Senior	Columbia, Maryland	Atholton
10	Ish Smith	Guard	6'0"	Junior	Concord, North Carolina	Central Cabarrus
0	Jeff Teague	Guard	6'2"	Sophomore	Indianapolis, Indiana	Pike
40	Ty Walker	Center	7'0"	Freshman	Wilmington, North Carolina	New Hanover
44	David Weaver	Forward/Center	6'11"	(redshirt) Junior	Black Mountain, North Carolina	Owen
42	L. D. Williams	Guard	6'4"	Junior	Yadkinville, North Carolina	Montverde Academy
55	Tony Woods	Center	6'11"	Freshman	Rome, Georgia	Rome

== Schedule ==
Date time, TV	Rank^{#}	Opponent^{#}	Result	Record	Site city, state
Regular season
November 14*; 7:00 p.m.	No. 21	North Carolina Central	W 94–48	1–0	LJVM Coliseum; Winston-Salem, NC
November 19*; 7:00 p.m., ACC Select	No. 20	UNC Wilmington	W 120–88	2–0	LJVM Coliseum; Winston-Salem, NC
November 24*; 8:00 p.m., ACC Select	No. 19	Winston-Salem State	W 62–31	3–0	LJVM Coliseum; Winston-Salem, NC
November 27*; 4:30 p.m., ESPN2	No. 19	vs. Cal State Fullerton; 2008 Anaheim Classic	W 75–69	4–0	Anaheim Convention Center; Anaheim, CA
November 28*; 3:45 p.m., ESPNU	No. 19	vs. UTEP; 2008 Anaheim Classic	W 82–79	5–0	Anaheim Convention Center; Anaheim, CA
November 30*; 10:30 p.m., ESPN2	No. 19	vs. Baylor; 2008 Anaheim Classic	W 87–74	6–0	Anaheim Convention Center; Anaheim, CA
December 3*; 7:15 p.m., ESPN	No. 15	Indiana; ACC/Big Ten Challenge	W 83–58	7–0	LJVM Coliseum; Winston-Salem, NC
December 6*; 7:30 p.m.	No. 15	Bucknell	W 81–52	8–0	LJVM Coliseum; Winston-Salem, NC
December 14*; 4:00 p.m., FSN	No. 11	Wright State	W 66–53	9–0	LJVM Coliseum; Winston-Salem, NC
December 19*; 7:00 p.m., ESPNU	No. 10	at Richmond	W 86–79	10–0	Robins Center; Richmond, VA
December 22*; 7:00 p.m., MASN	No. 6	at East Carolina	W 95–54	11–0	Williams Arena at Minges Coliseum; Greenville, NC
December 30*; 7:00 p.m., ACC Select	No. 6	Radford	W 83–61	12–0	LJVM Coliseum; Winston-Salem, NC
January 3*; 8:00 p.m., The Mountain	No. 6	at Brigham Young	W 94–87	13–0	Marriott Center; Provo, UT
January 11; 8:00 p.m., FSN	No. 4	No. 3 North Carolina	W 92–89	14–0 (1–0)	LJVM Coliseum; Winston-Salem, NC
January 14; 9:00 p.m., Raycom	No. 2	at Boston College	W 83–63	15–0 (2–0)	Conte Forum; Chestnut Hill, MA
January 17; 9:00 p.m., ABC	No. 2	at No. 10 Clemson	W 78–68	16–0 (3–0)	Littlejohn Coliseum; Clemson, SC
January 21; 7:00 p.m., ESPN2	No. 1	Virginia Tech	L 71–78	16–1 (3–1)	LJVM Coliseum; Winston-Salem, NC
January 28; 7:00 p.m., ESPN	No. 6	No. 1 Duke	W 70–68	17–1 (4–1)	LJVM Coliseum; Winston-Salem, NC
January 31; 12:00 p.m., Raycom	No. 6	at Georgia Tech	L 74–76	17–2 (4–2)	Alexander Memorial Coliseum; Atlanta, GA
February 4; 7:30 p.m., ESPN2	No. 7	at Miami	L 52–79	17–3 (4–3)	BankUnited Center; Coral Gables, FL
February 8; 4:00 p.m., Raycom	No. 7	Boston College	W 93–76	18–3 (5–3)	LJVM Coliseum; Winston-Salem, NC
February 11; 7:00 p.m., ACC Select	No. 7	at North Carolina State	L 76–82	18–4 (5–4)	RBC Center; Raleigh, NC
February 14; 4:00 p.m., Raycom	No. 7	No. 25 Florida State	W 86–63	19–4 (6–4)	LJVM Coliseum; Winston-Salem, NC
February 18; 7:30 p.m., ACC Select	No. 8	Georgia Tech	W 87–69	20–4 (7–4)	LJVM Coliseum; Winston-Salem, NC
February 22; 7:45 p.m., FSN	No. 8	at No. 9 Duke	L 91–101	20–5 (7–5)	Cameron Indoor Stadium; Durham, NC
February 26; 7:45 p.m., Raycom	No. 13	North Carolina State	W 85–78	21–5 (8–5)	LJVM Coliseum; Winston-Salem, NC
February 28; 8:00 p.m., Raycom	No. 13	at Virginia	W 70–60	22–5 (9–5)	John Paul Jones Arena; Charlottesville, VA
March 3; 9:00 p.m., FSN Regional	No. 10	at Maryland	W 65–63	23–5 (10–5)	Comcast Center; College Park, MD
March 8; 6:00 p.m., FSN	No. 10	No. 18 Clemson	W 96–88	24–5 (11–5)	LJVM Coliseum; Winston-Salem, NC
ACC Tournament
March 13; 7:00 p.m., ESPN2/Raycom	(2) No. 8	vs. (7) Maryland; Quarterfinals	L 64–75	24–6 (11–5)	Georgia Dome; Atlanta, GA
NCAA Tournament
March 20*; 9:40 p.m., CBS	(4 MW) No. 12	vs. (13 MW) Cleveland State; First Round	L 69–84	24–7 (11–5)	American Airlines Arena; Miami, FL
*Non-conference game. ^{#}Rankings from AP Poll. (#) Tournament seedings in parentheses. All times are in Eastern Time.

== Rankings ==
Ranking movements Legend: ██ Increase in ranking ██ Decrease in ranking ( ) = First-place votes
	Week																			
Poll	Pre	1	2	3	4	5	6	7	8	9	10	11	12	13	14	15	16	17	18	Final
AP	21	20	19	15	11	10	6	6	4	2 (2)	1 (68)	6	7	7	8	13	10	8	12	Not released
Coaches	24	25	24	17	11	10	6	6	4	3 (2)	1 (25)	4	6	8	8	14	10	9	11	20

== Leading scorer by game ==
Game	Player
North Carolina Central	Aminu (21)
UNC Wilmington	Teague (31)
Winston-Salem State	Teague (14)
Cal State Fullerton	Teague (24)
UTEP	Teague (29)
Baylor	Williams (15)
Indiana	Johnson (21)
Bucknell	Teague (26)
Wright State	Hale (17)
Richmond	Teague (21)
East Carolina	Aminu (21)
Radford	Teague (19)
Brigham Young	Teague (30)
North Carolina	Teague (34)
Boston College	Teague (29)
Clemson	Teague (24)
Virginia Tech	Teague (23)
Duke	Aminu (15)
Georgia Tech	Aminu (17)
Miami	Teague (19)
Boston College	Teague (27)
North Carolina State	Johnson (21)
Florida State	Aminu (17)
Georgia Tech	Johnson (24)
Duke	Teague (28)
NC State	Johnson (28)
Virginia	Aminu, McFarland, and Teague (12)
Maryland	Teague (17)
Clemson	Aminu and Johnson (21)
Maryland	Johnson (20)
Cleveland St.	Johnson (22)

== See also ==
- 2008-09 NCAA Division I men's basketball rankings
