= 2008–09 Virginia Tech Hokies men's basketball team =

American college basketball season

2008–09 Virginia Tech Hokies men's basketball

NIT, 2nd Round
- Conference: Atlantic Coast Conference
- Record: 19–15 (7–9 ACC)
- Head coach: Seth Greenberg
- Assistant coaches: James Johnson; Ryan Odom; Stacey Palmore
- Home arena: Cassell Coliseum

2008–09 ACC men's basketball standings
	Conf.				Overall
Team	W		L	PCT	W		L	PCT
No. 2 North Carolina	13	–	3	.813	34	–	4	.895
No. 6 Duke†	11	–	5	.688	30	–	7	.811
No. 12 Wake Forest	11	–	5	.688	24	–	7	.774
No. 16 Florida State	10	–	6	.625	25	–	10	.714
No. 24 Clemson	9	–	7	.563	23	–	9	.719
Boston College	9	–	7	.563	22	–	12	.647
Maryland	7	–	9	.438	21	–	14	.600
Virginia Tech	7	–	9	.438	19	–	15	.559
Miami (FL)	7	–	9	.438	19	–	13	.594
NC State	6	–	10	.375	16	–	14	.533
Virginia	4	–	12	.250	10	–	18	.357
Georgia Tech	2	–	14	.125	12	–	19	.387
† 2009 ACC tournament winner Rankings from AP Poll

The 2008–09 Virginia Tech Hokies men's basketball team competed in the Atlantic Coast Conference. The Hokies lost Deron Washington off of their 2007–08 team, which finished as the fourth place team in the conference and lost to Ole Miss in the NIT quarterfinals.

== Coaching staff ==
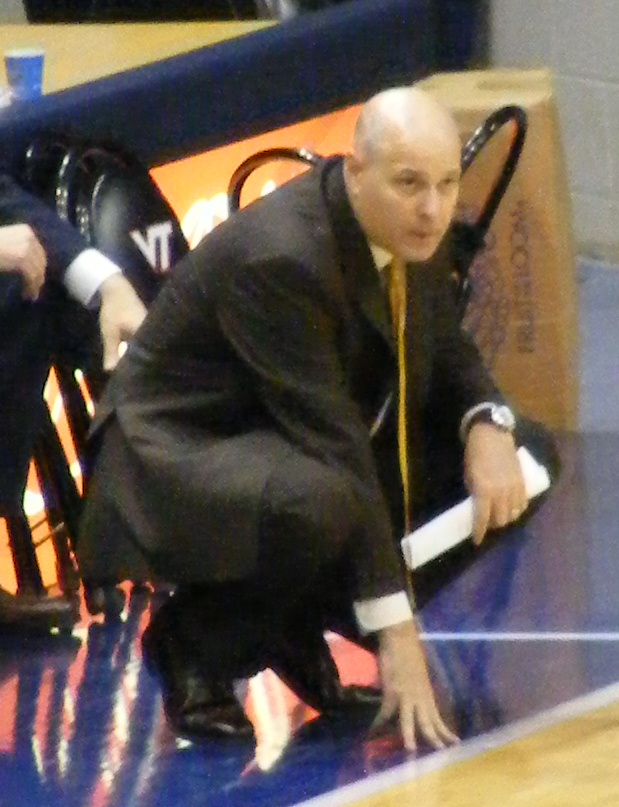
Seth Greenberg, head coach

Position	Name	First year at VT
Head coach	Seth Greenberg	2003
Assistant coach	James Johnson	2007
Assistant coach	Ryan Odom	2003
Assistant coach	Stacey Palmore	2004
Source: http://www.hokiesports.com/mbasketball/players/

== Roster ==
Note: Flags indicate national team eligibility at FIBA sanctioned events. Players may hold other non-FIBA nationality not displayed.

No.		Position	Player
0	(United States)	F	**Jeff Allen**
1	(United States)	G/F	Terrell Bell
4	(United States)	G	Evan Synstad
5	(United States)	G	Dorenzo Hudson
10	(United States)	G	Hank Thorns
11	(United States)	F	Chris Panneton
14	(Puerto Rico)	F	**Victor Davila**
15	(United States)	F	Terrance Vinson

No.		Position	Player
21	(United States)	F	Lewis Witcher
23	(United States)	G	**Malcolm Delaney**
32	(United States)	G	Paul Debnam
33	(United States)	F	**J. T. Thompson**
34	(Mali)	C	Cheick Diakite
40	(Puerto Rico)	G/F	**A. D. Vassallo**
42	(United States)	C	Gene Swindle

Starters are indicated in bold

== Schedule and results ==
Date	Opponent	Location	Result	Overall	Conf.
**Regular Season**
November 14, 2008	Gardner-Webb	Blacksburg, VA	W 65–62	1–0	0–0
November 17, 2008	Mount St. Mary's	Blacksburg, VA	W 62–57	2–0	0–0
November 20, 2008	Fairfield^{1}	San Juan, PR (O'Reilly Auto Parts Puerto Rico Tip-off)	W 74–57	3–0	0–0
November 21, 2008	Xavier	San Juan, PR (O'Reilly Auto Parts Puerto Rico Tip-off)	L 62–63 (OT)	3–1	0–0
November 23, 2008	Seton Hall	San Juan, PR (O'Reilly Auto Parts Puerto Rico Tip-off)	L 73–77	3–2	0–0
November 26, 2008	Elon	Blacksburg, VA	W 76–67	4–2	0–0
December 1, 2008	Wisconsin	Blacksburg, VA (ACC–Big Ten Challenge)	L 72–74	4–3	0–0
December 7, 2008	Navy	Washington, DC (BB&T Classic)	W 79–70	5–3	0–0
December 9, 2008	Georgia	Athens, GA	L 66–67	5–4	0–0
December 14, 2008	Longwood	Blacksburg, VA	W 79–57	6–4	0–0
December 20, 2008	Columbia	Madison Square Garden, NY (ECAC Holiday Festival)	W 64–52	7–4	0–0
December 21, 2008	St. John's	Madison Square Garden, NY (ECAC Holiday Festival)	W 81–67	8–4	0–0
December 29, 2008	Charleston Southern	Charleston, SC	W 75–66	9–4	0–0
January 4, 2009	#5 **Duke**	Durham, NC	L 44–69	9–5	0–1
January 10, 2009	**Virginia**	Blacksburg, VA (Virginia-Virginia Tech rivalry)	W 78–75	10–5	1–1
January 14, 2009	Richmond	Blacksburg, VA	W 62–48	11–5	1–1
January 17, 2009	**Boston College**	Blacksburg, VA	W 79–71	12–5	2–1
January 21, 2009	#1 **Wake Forest**	Winston-Salem, NC	W 78–71	13–5	3–1
January 25, 2009	**Miami**	Miami, FL	W 88–83 (OT)	14–5	4–1
January 29, 2009	#12 **Clemson**	Blacksburg, VA	L 82–86	14–6	4–2
January 31, 2009	**Boston College**	Chestnut Hill, MA	L 66–67	14–7	4–3
February 8, 2009	**NC State**	Blacksburg, VA	W 91–87 (OT)	15–7	5–3
February 11, 2009	**Georgia Tech**	Blacksburg, VA	W 76–71	16–7	6–3
February 14, 2009	**Maryland**	College Park, MD	L 73–83	16–8	6–4
February 18, 2009	**Virginia**	Charlottesville, VA (Virginia-Virginia Tech rivalry)	L 61–75	16–9	6–5
February 21, 2009	**Florida State**	Blacksburg, VA	L 65–67	16–10	6–6
February 25, 2009	#12 **Clemson**	Clemson, SC	W 80–77	17–10	7–6
February 28, 2009	#7 **Duke**	Blacksburg, VA	L 65–72	17–11	7–7
March 4, 2009	#2 **North Carolina**	Blacksburg, VA	L 78–86	17–12	7–8
March 8, 2009	#24 **Florida State**	Tallahassee, FL	L 53–63	17–13	7–9
*Conference games in **bold**, rankings from the AP Poll at the time of the game
