= 2008–09 Georgia Tech Yellow Jackets men's basketball team =

American college basketball season

2008–09 Georgia Tech Yellow Jackets men's basketball
- Conference: Atlantic Coast Conference
- Record: 12–19 (2–14 ACC)
- Head coach: Paul Hewitt (9th season)
- Assistant coaches: John O'Connor; Charlton Young; Peter Zaharis
- Home arena: Alexander Memorial Coliseum

2008–09 ACC men's basketball standings
	Conf.				Overall
Team	W		L	PCT	W		L	PCT
No. 2 North Carolina	13	–	3	.813	34	–	4	.895
No. 6 Duke†	11	–	5	.688	30	–	7	.811
No. 12 Wake Forest	11	–	5	.688	24	–	7	.774
No. 16 Florida State	10	–	6	.625	25	–	10	.714
No. 24 Clemson	9	–	7	.563	23	–	9	.719
Boston College	9	–	7	.563	22	–	12	.647
Maryland	7	–	9	.438	21	–	14	.600
Virginia Tech	7	–	9	.438	19	–	15	.559
Miami (FL)	7	–	9	.438	19	–	13	.594
NC State	6	–	10	.375	16	–	14	.533
Virginia	4	–	12	.250	10	–	18	.357
Georgia Tech	2	–	14	.125	12	–	19	.387
† 2009 ACC tournament winner Rankings from AP Poll

The 2008–09 Georgia Tech Yellow Jackets men's basketball team played basketball for the Georgia Tech Yellow Jackets. In 2007–08, they went 11–10 (4–4 ACC). Georgia Institute of Technology's basketball program is one of the most popular and successful college basketball programs in the nation. The Yellow Jackets have been to 2 NCAA Final Fours and have won 3 ACC Championships in the past 25 years. The program is most well known for its famous alumni, such as Chris Bosh, Stephon Marbury, Kenny Anderson, John Salley, Mark Price, and Jarrett Jack. Bobby Cremins built the Georgia Tech basketball program from the basement up and passed the torch to current head coach Paul Hewitt. Hewitt's teams feed off pressure defense and fast-paced transition offenses.

== Roster ==
Information from 2008-09 roster, subject to change.

Name	Number	Position	Height	Weight	Year	Hometown
Lewis Clinch	0	G	6-3	196	Senior	Cordele, Georgia
Iman Shumpert	1	G	6-5	200	Freshman	Oak Park, Illinois
Maurice Miller	3	G	6-2	185	Sophomore	Memphis, Tennessee
Nick Foreman	4	G	6-3	197	Freshman	Bellaire, Texas
Lance Storrs	10	G	6-5	220	Sophomore	Decatur, Georgia
Sam Shew	11	F	6-5	190	Freshman	Decatur, Georgia
Bassirou Dieng	12	F-C	6-9	220	Senior	Dakar, Senegal
D'Andre Bell	13	G/F	6-6	220	Senior	Los Angeles, California
Ty Anderson	14	G	6-4	200	Junior	Watkinsville, Georgia
Gary Cage	24	G	6-1	190	Senior	Atlanta, Georgia
Gani Lawal	31	F	6-9	233	Sophomore	Norcross, Georgia
Derek Craig	33	G	6-4	180	Freshman	Spring, Texas
Brad Sheehan	34	C	7-0	233	RS Sophomore	Latham, New York
Zachery Peacock	35	F	6-8	240	Junior	Miami, Florida
Alade Aminu	44	F	6-10	225	Senior	Stone Mountain, Georgia

== Schedule ==
Date	Opponent	Location	Time (EST)	Result	Overall	Conf.	Recap
**Exhibition Games**
November 7, 2008	Le Moyne	Alexander Memorial Coliseum • Atlanta, GA	7:00 PM	**W** 85-54	0-0	0-0	
**Regular Season**
November 14, 2008	Winston-Salem State	Alexander Memorial Coliseum • Atlanta, GA	8:30 PM	**W** 92-47	1-0	--	
November 22, 2008	@ Mercer	Macon, GA	1:00 PM	**W** 82-76 (ot)	2-0	--	
November 25, 2008	AR Pine Bluff	Alexander Memorial Coliseum • Atlanta, GA	7:30 PM	**W** 74-47	3-0	--	
November 28, 2008	Jacksonville	Alexander Memorial Coliseum • Atlanta, GA	7:30 PM	**W** 79-76	4-0	--	
December 3, 2008	Penn State	Alexander Memorial Coliseum • Atlanta, GA (ACC–Big Ten Challenge)	7:30 PM	**L** 85-83	4-1	--	
December 6, 2008	Vanderbilt	Alexander Memorial Coliseum • Atlanta, GA	2:00 PM	**W** 63-51	5-1	--	
December 14, 2008	UIC	Alexander Memorial Coliseum • Atlanta, GA	2:00 PM	**L** 66-60	5-2	--	
December 17, 2008	Georgia State	Alexander Memorial Coliseum • Atlanta, GA	7:30 PM	**W** 84-64	6-2	--	
December 20, 2008	@ Pepperdine	Malibu, CA	5:00 PM	**W** 86-58	7-2	--	
December 22, 2008	@ USC	Los Angeles	10:30 PM	**L** 76-57	7-3	--	
December 28, 2008	**Virginia**	Alexander Memorial Coliseum • Atlanta, GA	5:30 PM	**L** 88-84 (OT)	7-4	0-1	
December 30, 2008	Tennessee State	Alexander Memorial Coliseum • Atlanta, GA	8:30 PM	**W** 63-58	8-4	0-1	
January 3, 2009	@ Alabama	Tuscaloosa, AL	3:00 PM	**L** 88-77	8-5	0-1	
January 6, 2009	Georgia	Alexander Memorial Coliseum • Atlanta, GA (Clean, Old-Fashioned Hate)	7:00 PM	**W** 67-62	9-5	0-1	
January 10, 2009	@ **Maryland**	College Park, MD	12:00 PM	**L** 68-61	9-6	0-2	
January 14, 2009	**Duke**	Alexander Memorial Coliseum • Atlanta, GA	7:00 PM	**L** 70-56	9-7	0-3	
January 17, 2009	@ **N.C. State**	Raleigh, NC	12:00 PM	**L** 76-71 (ot)	9-8	0-4	
January 20, 2009	**Boston College**	Alexander Memorial Coliseum • Atlanta, GA	7:00 PM	**L** 80-76 (ot)	9-9	0-5	
January 25, 2009	@ **Clemson**	Littlejohn Coliseum • Clemson, SC	7:45 PM	**L** 73-59	9-10	0-6	
January 31, 2009	**Wake Forest**	Alexander Memorial Coliseum • Atlanta, GA	12:00 PM	**W** 76-74	10-10	1-6	
February 5, 2009	@ **Florida State**	Tallahassee, FL	7:00 PM	**L** 62-58	10-11	1-7	
February 8, 2009	**Maryland**	Alexander Memorial Coliseum • Atlanta, GA	7:30 PM	**L** 57-56	10-12	1-8	
February 11, 2009	@ **Virginia Tech**	Blacksburg, VA	7:00 PM	**L** 76-71	10-13	1-9	
February 14, 2009	**N.C. State**	Alexander Memorial Coliseum • Atlanta, GA	1:30 PM	**L** 86-65	10-14	1-10	
February 18, 2009	@ **Wake Forest**	Winston-Salem, NC	7:30 PM	**L** 87-69	10-15	1-11	
February 22, 2009	**Clemson**	Alexander Memorial Coliseum • Atlanta, GA	1:00 PM	**L** 81-73	10-16	1-12	
February 28, 2009	@ **North Carolina**	Chapel Hill, NC	12:00 PM	**L** 104-74	10-17	1-13	
March 4, 2009	**Miami**	Alexander Memorial Coliseum • Atlanta, GA	7:30 PM	**W** 78-68	11-17	2-13	
March 7, 2009	@ **Boston College**	Chestnut Hill, MA	12:00 PM	**L** 67-66	11-18	2-14	
**ACC Tournament**
March 12, 2008	**Clemson**	Georgia Dome • Atlanta, GA	2:00 PM	**W** 86-81	12-18	3-14	
March 13, 2008	**Florida State**	Georgia Dome • Atlanta, GA	2:00 PM	**L**64-62	12-19	3-15	
*Conference games in **bold**
