= 2008–09 Maryland Terrapins men's basketball team =

American college basketball season

2008–09 Maryland Terrapins men's basketball
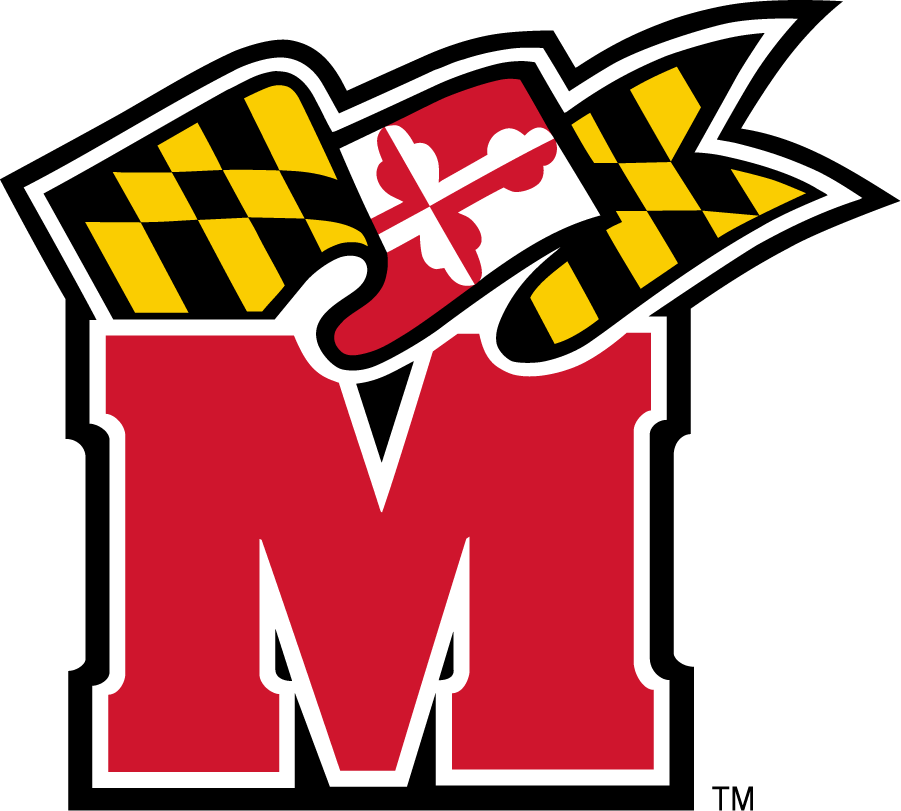

NCAA Tournament, Round of 32
- Conference: Atlantic Coast Conference
- Record: 21–14 (7–9 ACC)
- Head coach: Gary Williams
- Assistant coach: Keith Booth; Chuck Driesell; Robert Ehsan; Troy Wainwright
- Home arena: Comcast Center

2008–09 ACC men's basketball standings
	Conf.				Overall
Team	W		L	PCT	W		L	PCT
No. 2 North Carolina	13	–	3	.813	34	–	4	.895
No. 6 Duke†	11	–	5	.688	30	–	7	.811
No. 12 Wake Forest	11	–	5	.688	24	–	7	.774
No. 16 Florida State	10	–	6	.625	25	–	10	.714
No. 24 Clemson	9	–	7	.563	23	–	9	.719
Boston College	9	–	7	.563	22	–	12	.647
Maryland	7	–	9	.438	21	–	14	.600
Virginia Tech	7	–	9	.438	19	–	15	.559
Miami (FL)	7	–	9	.438	19	–	13	.594
NC State	6	–	10	.375	16	–	14	.533
Virginia	4	–	12	.250	10	–	18	.357
Georgia Tech	2	–	14	.125	12	–	19	.387
† 2009 ACC tournament winner Rankings from AP Poll

The 2008–2009 Maryland Terrapins men's basketball team represented the University of Maryland in National Collegiate Athletic Association (NCAA) Division I competition as a member of the Atlantic Coast Conference (ACC). The Terrapins qualified for the NCAA tournament for just the second time since the 2003–04 season. Maryland advanced to the second round before being eliminated by second-seeded Memphis. This exceeded expectations for the team, which had been described as a team that was small in stature without any highly touted athletes.

== Season recap ==
During the season, head coach Gary Williams came under fire for his alleged failure to find consistent success since Maryland won the national championship in 2002. At one point, he and an athletics department official argued publicly over the failure to secure recruit Tyree Evans and the transfer of Gus Gilchrist, two highly touted local players. Athletic director Deborah Yow responded to the situation by vowing support for Williams and ensured her intent to honor his current contract. Soon after, The Washington Post published a three-part feature on Maryland basketball that was critical of Gary Williams.

Early in the season, a lightly regarded Maryland team convincingly upset over fifth-ranked (and eventual national championship runners-up) Michigan State, 80–62, in the Old Spice Classic. Shortly thereafter, they defeated Michigan in the ACC-Big Ten Challenge. They then extended their winning streak to seven and appeared destined to win out in their non-conference schedule, which would have weighed heavily in their favor for an NCAA tournament bid. However, in their final out-of-conference game, they suffered an upset against Morgan State, 66–65.

After a 2–2 start to their conference schedule, which included an overtime loss to Florida State, second-ranked Duke routed the Terrapins, 85–44, in what was Maryland's worst-ever ACC loss. Late in the season, Maryland recovered to "stun" third-ranked North Carolina in overtime, and point guard Greivis Vasquez recorded the first triple-double by a Terrapin since 1987. Maryland then lost closely contested games against seventh-ranked Duke and tenth-ranked Wake Forest.

Maryland entered the ACC tournament needing a significant run to salvage hopes for a bid to the NCAA tournament. The Terrapins won in the first round against NC State and advanced to the quarterfinals, where they won a convincing victory over Wake Forest, 75–64. In the semifinals, they lost a hard-fought game against eventual conference champions, Duke, who had enjoyed a bye in the first game.

Having exceeded expectations in the ACC tournament, Maryland was awarded a bid to the NCAA tournament with a seed ranking of ten. In the first round, they played seventh-seeded California, where, after a near stalemate in the first half, Maryland pulled away in the second to win, 84–71. They then faced second-seeded Memphis, which held a 26-game winning streak.

Before the game, Memphis reserve forward Pierre Henderson-Niles said about Maryland, "We really ain't talked too much about Maryland. We watched a little film on 'em one time, and I know they got a good player—I don't know his name—but he good or whatever, so we just going to try to do what we do and stop him. I ain't never seen them; I know they got one good player, Sanchez or something like that, whatever his name is." Greivis Vasquez, the outspoken Maryland point guard to whom Henderson-Niles referred, said in response, "[Memphis would] have a losing record in the [Atlantic Coast Conference]—probably win all of their games outside the league, losing record in the league. The ACC is too tough. You can't just win games night in and night out because you’re so athletic."

Memphis accumulated a 14–0 run in the first half. Maryland, unable to ever significantly close the gap, eventually lost, 89–70. After the game, Vasquez rescinded his earlier remarks and conceded that Memphis might have finished .500 in the ACC. He said, "They'll never play in the ACC, so we'll never know. But they proved me wrong. They're such a good team. I give them credit."

== Roster ==
Note: Flags indicate national team eligibility at FIBA sanctioned events. Players may hold other non-FIBA nationality not displayed.

No.		Position	Player
1	(United States)	F	Landon Milbourne
4	(United States)	C	Braxton Dupree
5	(United States)	G	Eric Hayes
11	(South Korea)	F	Jin Soo Kim
14	(United States)	G	Sean Mosley
21	(Venezuela)	G	Greivis Vasquez
22	(United States)	G	Adrian Bowie

No.		Position	Player
23	(United States)	G/F	David Pearman
24	(United States)	G/F	Cliff Tucker
25	(United States)	C	Steve Goins
32	(United States)	F	Jerome Burney
33	(United States)	F	Dino Gregory
35	(United States)	F	Dave Neal

== Results ==
Date time, TV	Rank^{#}	Opponent^{#}	Result	Record	Site (attendance) city, state
Regular season
2008/11/14*; 8:00 p.m.		Bucknell	W 81–52	1–0	Comcast Center (17,342); College Park, MD
2008/11/18*; 8:00 p.m.		Youngstown State	W 73–49	2–0	Comcast Center (17,188); College Park, MD
2008/11/21*; 8:00 p.m., CSN		Vermont	W 89–74 ^{OT}	3–0	Comcast Center (17,950); College Park, MD
2008/11/27*; 7:00 p.m., ESPN2		vs. No. 6 Michigan State; Old Spice Classic	W 80–62	4–0	The Milk House (4,464); Lake Buena Vista, FL
2008/11/28*; 5:30 p.m., ESPN		vs. No. 10 Gonzaga; Old Spice Classic	L 59–81	4–1	The Milk House (4,658); Lake Buena Vista, FL
2008/11/30*; 5:30 p.m., ESPN2		vs. No. 16 Georgetown; Old Spice Classic	L 48–75	4–2	The Milk House (3,914); Lake Buena Vista, FL
2008/12/03*; 7:30 p.m., ESPN		Michigan; ACC-Big Ten Challenge	W 75–70	5–2	Comcast Center (17,950); College Park, MD
2008/12/07*; 7:30 p.m., MASN		vs. George Washington; BB&T Classic	W 76–53	6–2	Verizon Center (10,149); Washington, D.C.
2008/12/12*; 8:00 p.m., CSN		Delaware State	W 86–58	7–2	Comcast Center (17,014); College Park, MD
2008/12/22*; 7:30 p.m., CSN		American	W 67–51	8–2	Comcast Center (15,838); College Park, MD
2008/12/27*; 2:00 p.m.		Bryant University	W 72–51	9–2	Comcast Center (15,422); College Park, MD
2008/12/30*; 8:00 p.m.		Elon	W 76–50	10–2	Comcast Center (15,528); College Park, MD
2009/01/03*; 4:00 p.m., CSN		Charlotte	W 85–75	11–2	Comcast Center (16,423); College Park, MD
2009/01/07*; 8:00 p.m., CSN		Morgan State	L 65–66	11–3	Comcast Center (15,138); College Park, MD
2009/01/10; 12:00 p.m., Raycom		Georgia Tech	W 68–61	12–3	Comcast Center (17,569); College Park, MD
2009/01/14; 9:00 p.m., Raycom		at Miami (FL)	L 60–62	12–4	BankUnited Center (4,651); Coral Gables, FL
2009/01/17; 12:00 p.m., Raycom		at Florida State	L 73–76 ^{OT}	12–5	Donald L. Tucker Center (9,086); Tallahassee, FL
2009/01/20; 8:00 p.m., Raycom		Virginia	W 84–78	13–5	Comcast Center (16,205); College Park, MD
2009/01/24; 12:00 p.m., ESPN		at No. 2 Duke; Duke–Maryland rivalry	L 44–85	13–6	Cameron Indoor Stadium (9,314); Durham, NC
2009/01/27; 7:30 p.m., ESPN2		Boston College	L 67–76	13–7	Comcast Center (17,541); College Park, MD
2009/01/31; 8:00 p.m., Raycom		Miami (FL)	W 73–68	14–7	Comcast Center (17,950); College Park, MD
2009/02/03; 8:00 p.m., Raycom		at No. 4 North Carolina	L 91–108	14–8	Dean E. Smith Center (20,863); Chapel Hill, NC
2009/02/08; 7:30 p.m., FSN		at Georgia Tech	W 57–56	15–8	Alexander Memorial Coliseum (7,183); Atlanta, GA
2009/02/14; 4:00 p.m., Raycom		Virginia Tech	W 83–73	16–8	Comcast Center (17,950); College Park, MD
2009/02/17; 7:30 p.m., ESPN2		at No. 13 Clemson	L 64–93	16–9	Littlejohn Coliseum (9,700); Clemson, SC
2009/02/21; 3:30 p.m., ABC		No. 3 North Carolina	W 88–85 ^{OT}	17–9	Comcast Center (17,950); College Park, MD
2009/02/25; 9:00 p.m., ESPN		No. 7 Duke; Duke–Maryland rivalry	L 67–78	17–10	Comcast Center (17,950); College Park, MD
2009/03/01; 7:30 p.m., FSN		at North Carolina State	W 71–60	18–10	RBC Center (13,835); Raleigh, NC
2009/03/03; 9:00 pm, CSN		No. 10 Wake Forest	L 63–65	18–11	Comcast Center (17,950); College Park, MD
2009/03/07; 3:30 pm, ABC		at Virginia	L 63-68	18–12	John Paul Jones Arena (11,050); Charlottesville, VA
ACC tournament
2009/03/12; 7:00 p.m., ESPN2	(7)	vs. (10) NC State; First round	W 74–69	19–12	Georgia Dome (26,352); Atlanta, GA
2009/03/13; 7:00 p.m., ESPN2	(7)	vs. (2) No. 8 Wake Forest; Quarterfinals	W 75–64	20–12	Georgia Dome (26,352); Atlanta, GA
2009/03/14; 4:00 p.m., ESPN	(7)	vs. (3) No. 9 Duke; Semifinals	L 61–67	20–13	Georgia Dome (26,352); Atlanta, GA
NCAA tournament
2009/03/19*; 2:55 p.m., CBS	(10 W)	vs. (7 W) California; First Round	W 84–71	21–13	Sprint Center (17,319); Kansas City, MO
2009/03/21*; 3:20 p.m., CBS	(10 W)	vs. (2 W) No. 3 Memphis; Second Round	L 70–89	21–14	Sprint Center (18,247); Kansas City, MO
*Non-conference game. ^{#}Rankings from Coaches' Poll. (#) Tournament seedings in parentheses. W=West. All times are in Eastern Standard Time.
