= 2008–09 Boston College Eagles men's basketball team =

American college basketball season

2008–09 Boston College Eagles men's basketball
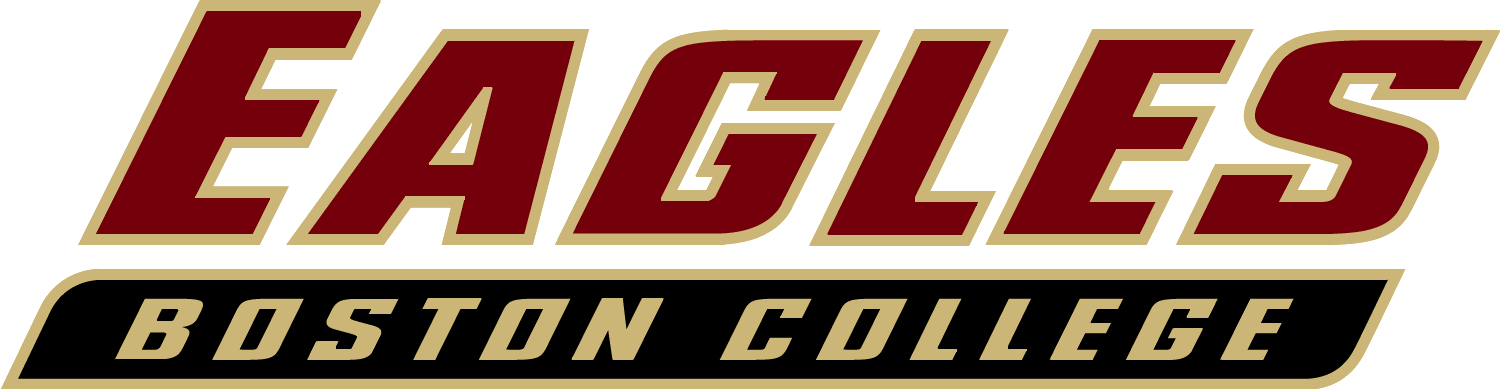

NCAA tournament, first round
- Conference: Atlantic Coast Conference
- Record: 22–12 (9–7 ACC)
- Head coach: Al Skinner (12th season)
- Assistant coaches: Pat Duquette (12th season); Bonzie Colson; Mo Cassara
- Home arena: Conte Forum

2008–09 ACC men's basketball standings
	Conf.				Overall
Team	W		L	PCT	W		L	PCT
No. 2 North Carolina	13	–	3	.813	34	–	4	.895
No. 6 Duke†	11	–	5	.688	30	–	7	.811
No. 12 Wake Forest	11	–	5	.688	24	–	7	.774
No. 16 Florida State	10	–	6	.625	25	–	10	.714
No. 24 Clemson	9	–	7	.563	23	–	9	.719
Boston College	9	–	7	.563	22	–	12	.647
Maryland	7	–	9	.438	21	–	14	.600
Virginia Tech	7	–	9	.438	19	–	15	.559
Miami (FL)	7	–	9	.438	19	–	13	.594
NC State	6	–	10	.375	16	–	14	.533
Virginia	4	–	12	.250	10	–	18	.357
Georgia Tech	2	–	14	.125	12	–	19	.387
† 2009 ACC tournament winner Rankings from AP Poll

The 2008–09 Boston College Eagles men's basketball team represented Boston College in the 2008–09 NCAA Division I men's basketball season. In 2007–08, they went 14–17 (4–12 ACC). The Eagles were led by twelfth-year head coach Al Skinner, played their games at the Conte Forum, and were members of the Atlantic Coast Conference.

== Roster ==
Name	Num.	Pos.	Ht.	Wt.	Class	Hometown	High School
Reggie Jackson	0	G	6–3	193	Fr.	Colorado Springs, Colorado	Palmer
Tyrese Rice	4	G	6–1	190	Sr.	Richmond, Virginia	L. C. Bird
Biko Paris	5	G	6–1	200	So.	New Orleans, Louisiana	Cypress Christian School
Brennan Bennett	10	G	6–0	185	So.	Whitinsville, Massachusetts	Northbridge
Corey Raji	11	F	6–6	218	So.	Township of Washington, Bergen County, New Jersey	Westwood
Joe Trapani	12	F	6–8	215	So.	Madison, Connecticut	Daniel Hand
Nick Mosakowski	14	G	6–1	180	So.	Swampscott, Massachusetts	Pingree School
Rakim Sanders	15	G-F	6–5	228	So.	Pawtucket, Rhode Island	St. Andrew's
Tyler Roche	21	G	6–7	208	Jr.	Hooksett, New Hampshire	Manchester Central
Josh Southern	52	C	6–10	255	So.	Saginaw, Michigan	Saginaw
Cortney Dunn	55	F	6–8	215	So.	Dallas, Texas	Lake Highlands

== Schedule ==
Date time, TV	Rank^{#}	Opponent^{#}	Result	Record	Site (attendance) city, state
November 9, 2008*; 1:00 pm		St. Francis Xavier; Exhibition	W 82–65	0–0	Conte Forum; Chestnut Hill, MA
November 14, 2008*; 6:00 pm		Central Connecticut	W 80–65	1–0	Conte Forum (4,197); Chestnut Hill, MA
November 17, 2008*; 7:00 pm, ESPNU		Loyola (MD); NIT Season Tip-Off	W 90–57	2–0	Conte Forum (4,283); Chestnut Hill, MA
November 18, 2008*; 7:00 pm		St. John's; NIT Season Tip-Off	W 82–70	3–0	Conte Forum (4,462); Chestnut Hill, MA
November 22, 2008*; 2:00 pm		at Saint Louis	L 50–53	3–1	Chaifetz Arena (9,127); St. Louis, MO
November 26, 2008*; 7:00 pm, ESPN2		vs. No. 10 Purdue; NIT Season Tip-Off	L 64–71	3–2	Madison Square Garden (4,438); New York, NY
November 28, 2008*; 7:00 pm, ESPN2		vs. UAB; NIT Season Tip-Off	W 83–77	4–2	Madison Square Garden (3,670); New York, NY
December 2, 2008*; 7:00 pm, ESPNU		Iowa; ACC-Big Ten Challenge	W 57–55	5–2	Conte Forum (4,084); Chestnut Hill, MA
December 6, 2008*; 8:30 pm, CBSCS		at UMass; Commonwealth Classic	W 85–81 ^{OT}	6–2	Mullins Center (6,792); Amherst, MA
December 10, 2008*; 7:00 pm		Bryant	W 80–61	7–2	Conte Forum (3,267); Chestnut Hill, MA
December 14, 2008*; 1:00 pm		South Carolina-Upstate	W 67–55	8–2	Conte Forum (3,881); Chestnut Hill, MA
December 20, 2008*; 4:00 pm, NESN		Providence	W 81–76	9–2	Conte Forum (6,880); Chestnut Hill, MA
December 23, 2008*; 1:00 pm		Maine	W 99–61	10–2	Conte Forum (2,692); Chestnut Hill, MA
December 29, 2008*; 7:00 pm		San Francisco	W 84–62	11–2	Conte Forum (5,231); Chestnut Hill, MA
December 31, 2008*; 2:00 pm		Sacred Heart	W 89–76	12–2	Conte Forum (2,137); Chestnut Hill, MA
January 4, 2009; 5:30 pm, FSN		at No. 1 North Carolina	W 85–78	13–2 (1–0)	Dean Smith Center (21,750); Chapel Hill, NC
January 7, 2009*; 7:00 pm	No. 17	Harvard	L 70–82	13–3 (1–0)	Conte Forum (3,174); Chestnut Hill, MA
January 10, 2009; 7:00 pm, ESPNU		Miami (FL)	L 71–77	13–4 (1–1)	Conte Forum (7,623); Chestnut Hill, MA
January 14, 2009; 7:00 pm, Raycom		No. 2 Wake Forest	L 63–83	13–5 (1–2)	Conte Forum (8,606); Chestnut Hill, MA
January 17, 2009; 4:00 pm, ESPNU		at Virginia Tech	L 71–79	13–6 (1–3)	Cassell Coliseum (9,847); Blacksburg, VA
January 20, 2009; 7:00 pm, NESN		at Georgia Tech	W 80–76 ^{OT}	14–6 (2–3)	Alexander Memorial Coliseum (7,174); Atlanta, GA
January 24, 2009; 2:00 pm, Raycom		NC State	W 79–68	15–6 (3–3)	Conte Forum (8,167); Chestnut Hill, MA
January 27, 2009; 7:30 pm, ESPN2		at Maryland	W 76–67	16–6 (4–3)	Comcast Center (17,541); College Park, MD
January 31, 2009; 8:00 pm, Raycom		Virginia Tech	W 67–66 ^{OT}	17–6 (5–3)	Conte Forum (8,428); Chestnut Hill, MA
February 4, 2009; 7:00 pm, ESPNU		at Virginia	W 80–70	18–6 (6–3)	John Paul Jones Arena (9,631); Charlottesville, VA
February 8, 2009; 4:00 pm, Raycom		at No. 7 Wake Forest	L 76–93	18–7 (6–4)	Lawrence Joel Veterans Memorial Coliseum (11,185); Winston-Salem, NC
February 10, 2009; 7:00 pm, NESN		No. 12 Clemson	L 77–87	18–8 (6–5)	Conte Forum (6,126); Chestnut Hill, MA
February 15, 2009; 4:00 pm, FSN		No. 6 Duke	W 80–74	19–8 (7–5)	Conte Forum (8,606); Chestnut Hill, MA
February 21, 2009; 12:00 pm, FSN		at Miami (FL)	L 58–69	19–9 (7–6)	BankUnited Center (4,979); Coral Gables, FL
February 24, 2009; 9:00 pm, ESPNU		No. 23 Florida State	W 72–67	20–9 (8–6)	Conte Forum (4,968); Chestnut Hill, MA
March 4, 2009; 7:00 pm, ESPNU		at NC State	L 69–74	20–10 (8–7)	RBC Center (15,111); Raleigh, NC
March 7, 2009; 12:00 pm, Raycom		Georgia Tech	W 67–66	21–10 (9–7)	Conte Forum (8,606); Chestnut Hill, MA
March 12, 2009; 9:30 pm, Raycom	(6)	vs. (11) Virginia; 2009 ACC men's basketball tournament	W 76–63	22–10 (9–7)	Georgia Dome (26,352); Atlanta, GA
March 13, 2009; 9:30 pm, Raycom	(6)	vs. (3) No. 9 Duke; 2009 ACC Men's Basketball Tournament	L 65–66	22–11 (9–7)	Georgia Dome (26,352); Atlanta, GA
March 20, 2009; 7:20 pm, CBS	(7)	vs. (10) USC; NCAA Tournament 1st Round	L 55–72	22–12	Hubert H. Humphrey Metrodome (12,814); Minneapolis, MN
*Non-conference game. ^{#}Rankings from AP Poll. (#) Tournament seedings in parentheses. All times are in Eastern Time.
