= 2008–09 North Carolina Tar Heels men's basketball team =

American college basketball season

2008–09 North Carolina Tar Heels men's basketball

NCAA tournament National Champions ACC Regular Season champions Maui Invitational champions

National Championship Game, W 89–72 vs. Michigan State
- Conference: Atlantic Coast Conference

Ranking
- Coaches: No. 1
- AP: No. 2
- Record: 34–4 (13–3 ACC)
- Head coach: Roy Williams (6th season)
- Assistant coaches: C. B. McGrath; Steve Robinson; Jerod Haase; Joe Holladay
- Home arena: Dean Smith Center

2008–09 ACC men's basketball standings
	Conf.				Overall
Team	W		L	PCT	W		L	PCT
No. 2 North Carolina	13	–	3	.813	34	–	4	.895
No. 6 Duke†	11	–	5	.688	30	–	7	.811
No. 12 Wake Forest	11	–	5	.688	24	–	7	.774
No. 16 Florida State	10	–	6	.625	25	–	10	.714
No. 24 Clemson	9	–	7	.563	23	–	9	.719
Boston College	9	–	7	.563	22	–	12	.647
Maryland	7	–	9	.438	21	–	14	.600
Virginia Tech	7	–	9	.438	19	–	15	.559
Miami (FL)	7	–	9	.438	19	–	13	.594
NC State	6	–	10	.375	16	–	14	.533
Virginia	4	–	12	.250	10	–	18	.357
Georgia Tech	2	–	14	.125	12	–	19	.387
† 2009 ACC tournament winner Rankings from AP Poll

The 2008–09 North Carolina Tar Heels men's basketball team represented the University of North Carolina at Chapel Hill. The head coach was Roy Williams. The team played its home games in the Dean Smith Center in Chapel Hill, North Carolina, and was a member of the Atlantic Coast Conference. The team won the 2009 NCAA Division I men's basketball tournament, the fifth NCAA national title in school history. Considered one of the greatest teams in college basketball history, the Tar Heels won their six NCAA tournament games by double digits, and by an average of 19.8 points per game. They were ranked as the 30th best team in college basketball history by Bleacher Report in 2012.

== Preseason ==
The Tar Heels were a trendy pick to win the National Championship that year, primarily because Wayne Ellington, Danny Green and Ty Lawson decided to withdraw from the 2008 NBA draft, and consensus national Player of the Year Tyler Hansbrough never declared for that draft. In addition, the players had been embarrassed in the previous season's Final Four by Kansas, and they were motivated to atone for that poor performance. In the preseason ESPN/USA Today Coaches Poll the Tar Heels were ranked #1. They were the first unanimous preseason #1 ranking in the history of the ESPN/USA Today Coaches Poll. UNC also received the first unanimous preseason #1 ranking in the history of the Associated Press Poll.

=== Recruiting ===
College recruiting information
Name	Hometown	School	Height	Weight	Commit date
Ed Davis; PF	Richmond, Virginia	Benedictine HS	6 ft 10 in (2.08 m)	225 lb (102 kg)	Jul 18, 2007
Ed Davis; PF	Recruit ratings: Scout: Rivals: (96)				
Larry Drew II; PG	Encino, California	Woodland Hills Taft	6 ft 2 in (1.88 m)	180 lb (82 kg)	May 23, 2007
Larry Drew II; PG	Recruit ratings: Scout: Rivals: (96)				
Justin Watts; SG	Durham, North Carolina	Jordan HS	6 ft 4 in (1.93 m)	210 lb (95 kg)	May 20, 2008
Justin Watts; SG	Recruit ratings: Scout: Rivals: (40)				
Tyler Zeller; PF	Washington, Indiana	Washington HS	7 ft 0 in (2.13 m)	250 lb (110 kg)	Jan 4, 2008
Tyler Zeller; PF	Recruit ratings: Scout: Rivals: (96)				
Overall recruit ranking: Scout: 5 Rivals: 11 ESPN: 7
Note: In many cases, Scout, Rivals, 247Sports, On3, and ESPN may conflict in their listings of height and weight.; In these cases, the average was taken. ESPN grades are on a 100-point scale.; Sources: "North Carolina Basketball Commitments". Rivals.; "2008 North Carolina Basketball Commits". Scout.; "ESPN". ESPN.; "Scout.com Team Recruiting Rankings". Scout.; "2008 Team Ranking". Rivals.

== Roster ==
2008–09 North Carolina Tar Heels men's basketball team
Players
Coaches

Pos.	#	Name	Height	Weight	Year	Previous school	Hometown
G	2	Marc Campbell	5 ft 11 in (1.8 m)	175 lb (79 kg)	Jr	Ravenscroft	Raleigh, NC
F	40	Mike Copeland	6 ft 7 in (2.01 m)	235 lb (107 kg)	Sr	R. J. Reynolds	Winston-Salem, NC
F	32	Ed Davis	6 ft 10 in (2.08 m)	215 lb (98 kg)	Fr	Benedictine	Richmond, VA
G	11	Larry Drew II	6 ft 1 in (1.85 m)	180 lb (82 kg)	Fr	Woodland Hills Taft	Encino, CA
G	22	Wayne Ellington	6 ft 4 in (1.93 m)	200 lb (91 kg)	Jr	Episcopal Academy	Wynnewood, PA
G	4	Bobby Frasor	6 ft 3 in (1.91 m)	210 lb (95 kg)	Sr	Brother Rice	Blue Island, IL
G	1	Marcus Ginyard	6 ft 5 in (1.96 m)	220 lb (100 kg)	Sr	Bishop O'Connell	Alexandria, VA
F	13	Will Graves	6 ft 6 in (1.98 m)	245 lb (111 kg)	So	Dudley	Greensboro, NC
F	14	Danny Green	6 ft 6 in (1.98 m)	210 lb (95 kg)	Sr	St. Mary's	North Babylon, NY
F	50	Tyler Hansbrough	6 ft 9 in (2.06 m)	250 lb (113 kg)	Sr	Poplar Bluff	Poplar Bluff, MO
G	5	Ty Lawson	5 ft 11 in (1.8 m)	195 lb (88 kg)	Jr	Oak Hill Academy	Clinton, MD
F	35	Patrick Moody	6 ft 4 in (1.93 m)	195 lb (88 kg)	Sr	T. C. Roberson	Asheville, NC
G	15	J. B. Tanner	6 ft 0 in (1.83 m)	185 lb (84 kg)	Sr	West Henderson	Hendersonville, NC
F	21	Deon Thompson	6 ft 8 in (2.03 m)	245 lb (111 kg)	Jr	Torrance	Torrance, CA
G	24	Justin Watts	6 ft 4 in (1.93 m)	205 lb (93 kg)	Fr	Jordan	Durham, NC
G	30	Jack Wooten	6 ft 2 in (1.88 m)	190 lb (86 kg)	Sr	Walter Williams	Burlington, NC
F	44	Tyler Zeller	7 ft 0 in (2.13 m)	220 lb (100 kg)	Fr	Washington	Washington, IN

Head coach

Roy Williams

Assistant coach(es)

Joe Holladay
Steve Robinson
Jerod Haase

Legend

- (C) Team captain
- (S) Suspended
- (I) Ineligible
- (W) Walk-on
- Injured
- Current redshirt

Roster
Last update: October 31, 2012

== Schedule ==
The Tar Heels rolled through the nonconference schedule, along the way winning the Maui Invitational for the third time. They sputtered out of the gate to start ACC play, dropping their first two conference games to Boston College and Wake Forest. However, they recovered to reel off 10 straight conference wins, including a 101–87 thrashing of rival Duke. Their only relatively close games during this stretch came against the ACC's two Florida teams—most notably against Florida State, in which they escaped with a Ty Lawson buzzer-beater.

They lost to Maryland in overtime, but recovered to win their last three games. A win over Virginia Tech gave the Tar Heels at least a share of their 27th regular season title (which are not recognized by the ACC as official championships; the tournament winner is declared champion), and third in a row. They won the title outright with a season-ending win over Duke.

The ACC tournament did not go nearly as well, largely because Ty Lawson was sidelined with an injured big toe. They needed a last-minute score to defeat Virginia Tech, then fell to Florida State in the second round. Still, the Tar Heels were rewarded with the #2 ranking in the final AP Poll, behind Louisville. They also finished third in the final regular-season Coaches Poll, behind Louisville and Memphis.

Despite not making it to the ACC title game, the Tar Heels received the top seed in the NCAA South Region. It was the 13th time the Tar Heels had been selected as a #1 seed—the most since the NCAA began seeding the tournament field in 1979. It is also UNC's 41st NCAA appearance—tied with UCLA for the second-most in history.

The Tar Heels played their first- and second-round games at the Greensboro Coliseum, just an hour west of Chapel Hill. They easily dispatched Radford and LSU to advance to the regionals at the FedExForum in Memphis. In the regional round, the Heels dismantled Gonzaga 93–77. In the regional final, they defeated Oklahoma 72–60 to advance to the Final Four for the 18th time in school history—tied with UCLA for the most ever. The wins in the regional phase were also the school's 100th and 101st wins in the NCAA Tournament, passing Kentucky for most all-time, although Kentucky has reclaimed the top spot as of 2019.

The Tar Heels were the highest seed to reach the Final Four at Ford Field in Detroit; they were the overall #3 seed in the tournament behind Louisville and Pittsburgh. In the national semifinal, the Tar Heels pounded Villanova 83–69 to advance to the national championship game for the ninth time in school history. They played against Michigan State, whom the Tar Heels defeated 98–63 during the December 2008 ACC-Big Ten Challenge. They were no less dominant in the title game, winning 89–72 for the school's fifth NCAA national title—tied for the third-most all-time. The win capped off one of the most dominant runs in the tournament's history. The Tar Heels won every game by at least 12 points—a feat all the more remarkable since they upended four teams ranked in the top 15 of the final AP Poll in the process (#10 Gonzaga, #7 Oklahoma, #11 Villanova and #8 Michigan State). They also led for all but 10 minutes of a possible 240 minutes of game time. It also allowed Tyler Hansbrough and his fellow seniors to end their careers as the winningest class in school history.

Wayne Ellington was named the tournament's Most Outstanding Player, the fourth Tar Heel to earn the award.

Date time, TV	Rank^{#}	Opponent^{#}	Result	Record	Site (attendance) city, state
Exhibition games
November 8*; 4:00 p.m.	No. 1	UNC Pembroke; Exhibition	W 102–62	0–0	Dean Smith Center (18,793); Chapel Hill, NC
Regular season
November 15*; 4:00 p.m., FSN	No. 1	Penn	W 86–71	1–0	Dean Smith Center (19,623); Chapel Hill, NC
November 18*; 9:00 p.m., ESPN	No. 1	Kentucky	W 77–58	2–0	Dean Smith Center (21,538); Chapel Hill, NC
November 21*; 10:00 p.m., ESPNU	No. 1	at UC Santa Barbara	W 84–67	3–0	Campus Events Center (6,000); Santa Barbara, CA
November 24*; 9:30 p.m., ESPNU	No. 1	at Chaminade; Maui Invitational	W 115–70	4–0	Lahaina Civic Center (2,500); Lahaina, HI
November 25*; 9:30 p.m., ESPN	No. 1	vs. Oregon; Maui Invitational	W 98–69	5–0	Lahaina Civic Center (2,500); Lahaina, HI
November 26*; 10:00 p.m., ESPN	No. 1	vs. No. 8 Notre Dame; Maui Invitational	W 102–87	6–0	Lahaina Civic Center (2,500); Lahaina, HI
November 30*; 6:30 p.m., FSN	No. 1	UNC Asheville	W 116–48	7–0	Dean Smith Center (18,054); Chapel Hill, NC
December 3*; 9:15 p.m., ESPN	No. 1	vs. No. 13 Michigan State; ACC–Big Ten Challenge/Basketbowl II	W 98–63	8–0	Ford Field (25,267); Detroit, MI
December 13*; 6:00 p.m., ESPN2	No. 1	Oral Roberts	W 100–84	9–0	Dean Smith Center (21,269); Chapel Hill, NC
December 18*; 7:00 p.m., ESPN	No. 1	Evansville	W 91–73	10–0	Dean Smith Center (21,291); Chapel Hill, NC
December 20*; 2:00 p.m., ESPNU	No. 1	vs. Valparaiso	W 85–63	11–0	United Center (10,645); Chicago, IL
December 28*; 7:45 p.m., FSN	No. 1	Rutgers	W 97–75	12–0	Dean Smith Center (21,750); Chapel Hill, NC
December 31*; 10:00 p.m., ESPN2	No. 1	at Nevada	W 84–61	13–0	Lawlor Events Center (10,526); Reno, NV
January 4; 5:30 p.m., FSN	No. 1	Boston College	L 78–85	13–1 (0–1)	Dean Smith Center (21,750); Chapel Hill, NC
January 7*; 9:00 p.m., FSN-South	No. 3	College of Charleston	W 108–70	14–1 (0–1)	Dean Smith Center (20,543); Chapel Hill, NC
January 11; 8:00 p.m., FSN	No. 3	at No. 4 Wake Forest	L 89–92	14–2 (0–2)	Lawrence Joel Coliseum (14,714); Winston-Salem, NC
January 15; 9:00 p.m., ESPN	No. 5	at Virginia	W 83–61	15–2 (1–2)	John Paul Jones Arena (13,811); Charlottesville, VA
January 17; 9:00 p.m., ESPN	No. 5	Miami (FL); ESPN College GameDay	W 82–65	16–2 (2–2)	Dean Smith Center (21,750); Chapel Hill, NC
January 21; 9:00 p.m., ESPN	No. 5	No. 10 Clemson	W 94–70	17–2 (3–2)	Dean Smith Center (21,750); Chapel Hill, NC
January 28; 9:00 p.m., Raycom	No. 5	at Florida State	W 80–77	18–2 (4–2)	Donald L. Tucker Center (11,333); Tallahassee, FL
January 31; 3:30 p.m., ABC	No. 5	at NC State; Carolina-NC State rivalry	W 93–76	19–2 (5–2)	RBC Center (19,700); Raleigh, NC
February 3; 8:00 p.m., Raycom/ESPN	No. 3	Maryland	W 108–91	20–2 (6–2)	Dean Smith Center (20,863); Chapel Hill, NC
February 7; 4:00 p.m., Raycom	No. 3	Virginia	W 76–61	21–2 (7–2)	Dean Smith Center (20,879); Chapel Hill, NC
February 11; 9:00 p.m., Raycom/ESPN	No. 3	at No. 6 Duke; Carolina-Duke rivalry	W 101–87	22–2 (8–2)	Cameron Indoor Stadium (9,314); Durham, NC
February 15; 7:45 p.m., FSN	No. 3	at Miami (FL)	W 69–65	23–2 (9–2)	BankUnited Center (7,200); Coral Gables, FL
February 18; 8:00 p.m., Raycom	No. 3	NC State; Carolina-NC State rivalry	W 89–80	24–2 (10–2)	Dean Smith Center (21,750); Chapel Hill, NC
February 21; 3:30 p.m., ABC	No. 3	at Maryland	L 85–88 ^{OT}	24–3 (10–3)	Comcast Center (17,950); College Park, MD
February 28; 12:00 p.m., CBS	No. 4	Georgia Tech	W 104–74	25–3 (11–3)	Dean Smith Center (20,959); Chapel Hill, NC
March 4; 7:00 p.m., ESPN	No. 2	at Virginia Tech	W 86–78	26–3 (12–3)	Cassell Coliseum (9,847); Blacksburg, VA
March 8; 4:00 p.m., CBS	No. 2	No. 7 Duke; Senior Day/Carolina-Duke rivalry	W 79–71	27–3 (13–3)	Dean Smith Center (21,750); Chapel Hill, NC
ACC Tournament
March 13; 12:00 p.m., Raycom/ESPN2	No. 1	vs. Virginia Tech; ACC men's basketball tournament	W 79–76	28–3	Georgia Dome (26,352); Atlanta, GA
March 14; 1:30 p.m., Raycom/ESPN2	No. 1	vs. No. 22 Florida State; ACC men's basketball tournament	L 70–73	28–4	Georgia Dome (26,352); Atlanta, GA
NCAA tournament
March 19*; 2:50 p.m., CBS	No. 2 (1-S)	vs. No. (16-S) Radford; First Round	W 101–58	29–4	Greensboro Coliseum (20,226); Greensboro, NC
March 21*; 5:45 p.m., CBS	No. 2 (1-S)	vs. No. 21 (8-S) LSU; Second Round	W 84–70	30–4	Greensboro Coliseum (22,479); Greensboro, NC
March 27*; 9:57 p.m., CBS	No. 2 (1-S)	vs. No. 10 (4-S) Gonzaga; Sweet Sixteen	W 98–77	31–4	FedExForum (17,103); Memphis, TN
March 29*; 5:05 p.m., CBS	No. 2 (1-S)	vs. No. 7 (2-S) Oklahoma; Elite Eight	W 72–60	32–4	FedExForum (17,025); Memphis, TN
April 4*; 8:47 p.m., CBS	No. 2 (1-S)	vs. No. 11 (3-E) Villanova; Final Four	W 83–69	33–4	Ford Field (72,456); Detroit, MI
April 6*; 9:21 p.m., CBS	No. 2 (1-S)	vs. No. 8 (2-M) Michigan State; National Championship Game	W 89–72	34–4	Ford Field (72,922); Detroit, MI
*Non-conference game. ^{#}Rankings from AP Poll. (#) Tournament seedings in parentheses. All times are in Eastern Time Rank indicates seed in the NCAA tournament. E-East Region, W-West Region, S-South Region, M-Midwest Region.

== Rankings ==
Ranking movements Legend: ██ Increase in ranking ██ Decrease in ranking ( ) = First-place votes
	Week																			
Poll	Pre	1	2	3	4	5	6	7	8	9	10	11	12	13	14	15	16	17	18	Final
AP	1 (72)	1 (72)	1 (72)	1 (72)	1 (72)	1 (72)	1 (71)	1 (72)	3 (2)	5	5	5 (11)	3 (3)	3 (2)	3 (2)	4	2 (3)	1 (35)	2 (11)	Not released
Coaches	1 (31)	1 (30)	1 (31)	1 (31)	1 (31)	1 (31)	1 (31)	1 (31)	3 (1)	6	6	6	4	3	3	5	2	1 (1)	3 (6)	1 (31)

== Team players drafted into the NBA ==
Year	Round	Pick	Player	NBA club
2009	1	13	Tyler Hansbrough	Indiana Pacers
2009	1	18	Ty Lawson	Denver Nuggets
2009	1	28	Wayne Ellington	Minnesota Timberwolves
2009	2	46	Danny Green	Cleveland Cavaliers
2010	1	13	Ed Davis	Toronto Raptors
2012	1	17	Tyler Zeller	Dallas Mavericks
