= 2008–09 Clemson Tigers men's basketball team =

American college basketball season

2008–09 Clemson Tigers men's basketball

Charleston Classic champions

NCAA tournament, first round
- Conference: Atlantic Coast Conference

Ranking
- AP: No. 24
- Record: 23–9 (9–7 ACC)
- Head coach: Oliver Purnell
- Assistant coaches: Ron Bradley; Frank Smith; Josh Postorino
- Home arena: Littlejohn Coliseum

2008–09 ACC men's basketball standings
	Conf.				Overall
Team	W		L	PCT	W		L	PCT
No. 2 North Carolina	13	–	3	.813	34	–	4	.895
No. 6 Duke†	11	–	5	.688	30	–	7	.811
No. 12 Wake Forest	11	–	5	.688	24	–	7	.774
No. 16 Florida State	10	–	6	.625	25	–	10	.714
No. 24 Clemson	9	–	7	.563	23	–	9	.719
Boston College	9	–	7	.563	22	–	12	.647
Maryland	7	–	9	.438	21	–	14	.600
Virginia Tech	7	–	9	.438	19	–	15	.559
Miami (FL)	7	–	9	.438	19	–	13	.594
NC State	6	–	10	.375	16	–	14	.533
Virginia	4	–	12	.250	10	–	18	.357
Georgia Tech	2	–	14	.125	12	–	19	.387
† 2009 ACC tournament winner Rankings from AP Poll

The 2008–09 Clemson Tigers men's basketball team represented Clemson University. The head coach was Oliver Purnell. The team played its home games in Littlejohn Coliseum in Clemson, South Carolina. All games were produced and broadcast locally by the Clemson Tigers Sports Network.

== Pre-season ==
On Tuesday, October 21, 2008, the NCAA suspended Freshman Catalin Baciu for the first five games of the season for his participation with a Romanian professional basketball team. The term of the suspension equals the number of games Baciu played as a 15-year-old for U-Mobitelco Cluj, a club team that plays in Romania's top pro division, Divizia A. Although Baciu was not paid for his participation, NCAA rules prohibit student-athletes from playing on a professional team, regardless of whether they are employed. He played for a total of four minutes in his five games with U-Mobitelco Cluj.

On Sunday, October 26, 2008, members of the ACC media were polled and picked Clemson to finish fifth in the conference behind North Carolina, Duke, Wake Forest and Miami respectively.

== Regular season ==
On Sunday, November 16, 2008, The Tigers won the inaugural Charleston Classic 8-team tournament in Charleston, SC. This marks the 25th time in school history Clemson has won a regular season tournament.

On Saturday, November 22, 2008, Clemson beat Charlotte 71–70 at Halton Arena, marking the first time ever a current member of the Atlantic Coast Conference has played at Charlotte. (Miami played during there during their time as a member of the Big East).

On Wednesday, January 21, 2009, Clemson lost to North Carolina 94–70. This extended the NCAA record for the longest road losing streak against one opponent to 54 games. This also ended Clemson's streak of not losing back-to-back ACC games that dated back to the 2006–07 season.

On Sunday, January 25, 2009, with a 73–59 victory over Georgia Tech, Senior guard K. C. Rivers broke the team record for most career wins as a player with 85. The previous record of 84 was co-held Cliff Hammonds and Elden Campbell.

On Monday, February 2, 2009, EA Sports announced that Littlejohn Coliseum was one of the Top-15 toughest places to play in college basketball. Through an online poll, Fans determined 15 finalists, whose home courts were judged to be the most difficult for opposing teams to play in. These results will form an integral part of a new game mode in the EA SPORTS NCAA Basketball videogame franchise for 2009–10.

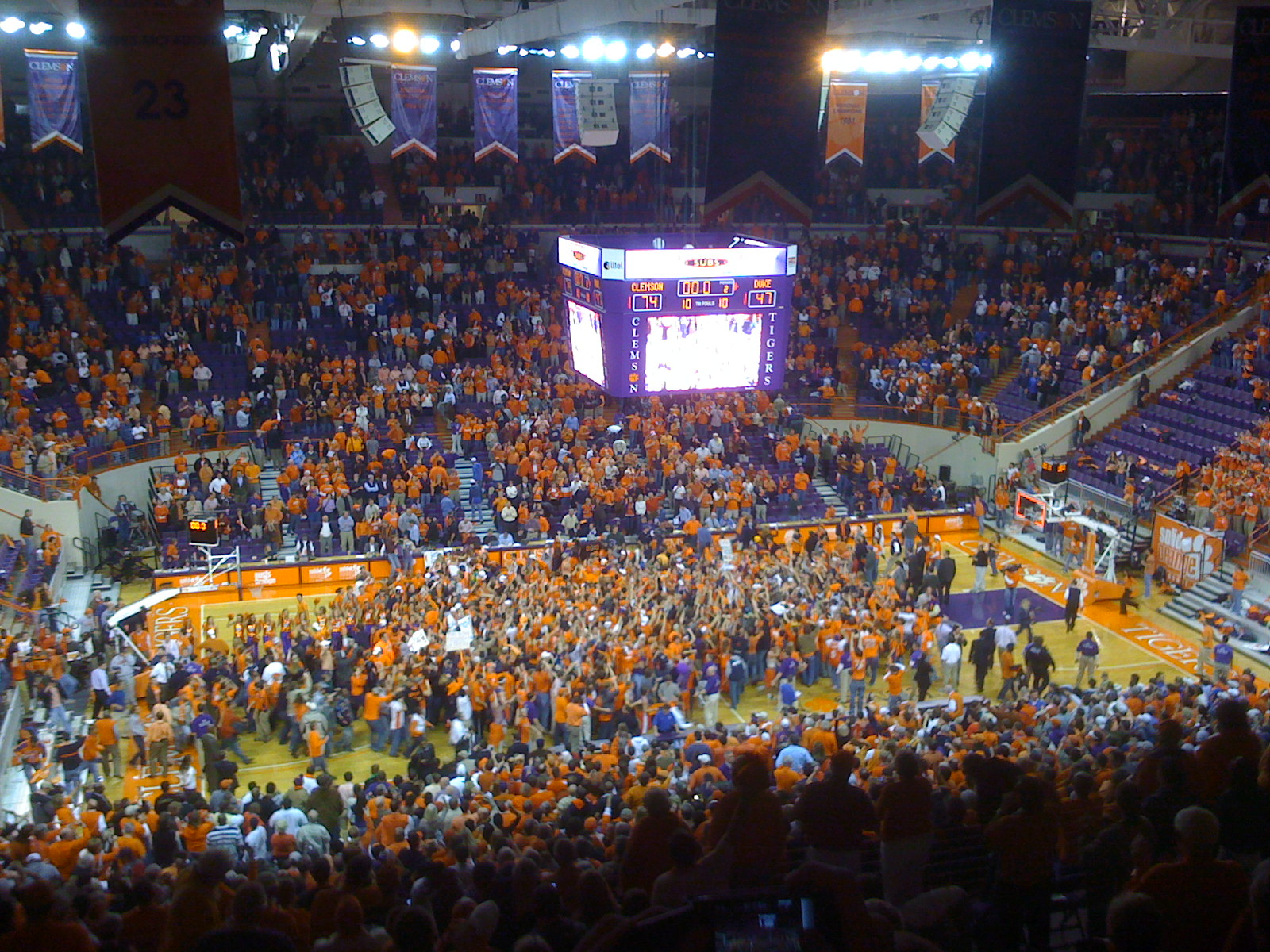
Students rush the court after No. 10 Clemson's 74–47 victory over No. 3 Duke (2009-2-4)

On Wednesday, February 4, 2009, Clemson defeated No. 3 Duke in Littlejohn Coliseum by a score of 74–47. With the win, Clemson snapped a 22-game regular season losing streak to the Blue Devils dating back to January 7, 1997. The win was also Clemson's first win over a top-5 team since a victory over No. 5 Virginia in 2002.

The 27-point victory was Clemson's largest margin of victory against a top 25 team in history. The previous best was a 22-point victory margin on two occasions. Clemson defeated a fourth-ranked NC State team led by David Thompson at Clemson 92–70 on Feb 22, 1975 at Clemson, and defeated a 13th ranked Maryland team by 22 points, 93–71 on January 19, 1977, at Clemson.

The defeat was also the worst suffered by Duke since the NCAA Championship game of 1990, a 103–73 victory by UNLV on April 2, 1990. The 27-point margin was the largest for Duke in an ACC regular season game since January 18, 1984, when Wake Forest defeated Duke at Winston-Salem, 97–66.

Clemson's 10-point win over Boston College in Boston on Feb 10 was just the third ACC road win over an ACC team that finished the year with a winning record in the last 22 years. Boston College finished the ACC regular season with a 9–7 record and went to the NCAA tournament.

On Tuesday, February 17, the EA Sports Tour visited Littlejohn Coliseum as Clemson hosted Maryland. Along with judging the game day atmosphere, the tour handed out video games, T-shirts and hosted an NCAA Basketball 09 tournament leading up to the game. After their visit, Novell Thomas, the producer of the NCAA Basketball game, wrote that "Hands down, Clemson just set the bar for all hosts of the EA SPORTS Toughest Places to Play, tour." The 29-point victory was the largest margin of victory in Clemson history over Maryland, and tied for the largest margin of victory for a Clemson team against an ACC team that advanced to the NCAA Tournament. Clemson defeated Florida State in 1997–98 by 29 points.

The Tigers finished the season at 9–7, which gave them back-to-back winning seasons in the conference for the first time since the 1965–66 and 1966–67 teams did it. It is also Clemson's eleventh winning season in the conference since 1953.

Clemson defeated five NCAA tournament teams during the regular season in Duke, Maryland, Boston College, Temple and Illinois. It is the most wins over NCAA Tournament teams in the regular season for the Clemson program since 1997–98.

Clemson finished the regular season with a 14–0 record against non-conference teams, one of just eight Division I teams with a perfect non-conference record. The others were Pittsburgh, UConn, North Carolina, Wake Forest, Minnesota, Illinois State and Stanford.

The Tigers won seven regular season ACC games by double digits, the most regular season league wins by 10 points or more in Clemson history. Statistically, Clemson finished the year with a +10.3 average margin of victory, third best in school history. Clemson's .688 free throw percentage was the third best for the program in the last 22 years. Clemson's .374 three-point percentage was the fourth best in school history.

== Postseason ==
=== ACC tournament ===
Clemson entered the ACC tournament as the No. 5 seed with a 9–7 record in the ACC Regular Season. The Tigers lost their opening game to No. 12 seed Georgia Tech 86–81 dropping their record to 3–8 all-time in the opening round of the tournament.

=== NCAA tournament ===
Clemson was selected for the NCAA tournament for the second consecutive year, joining Duke and North Carolina as the only ACC schools to make the tournament each of the last two years. It was just the third time in Clemson history that Clemson has gone to the NCAAs in consecutive years. The Tigers opened the tournament in Kansas City, Missouri, as the No. 7 seed in the South Region. Down by double digits against #10-seed Michigan in the first round, the Tigers went on a 14–0 run to make it 58–57 with just over a minute left. Clemson had a chance to tie the game with 13 seconds left, but K. C. Rivers' contested 3-pointer at the buzzer fell short. The 59–62 loss dropped Oliver Purnell to 0–5 all-time in NCAA Tournament games as a head coach.

== Roster ==
=== Coaches & staff ===
Position	Name	Year at CU	Experience	Alma mater	Hometown
Head coach	Oliver Purnell	6th	31	Old Dominion ('75)	Berlin, Maryland, United States
Associate head coach	Ron Bradley	6th	31	Eastern Nazarene ('74)	Springfield, Massachusetts, United States
Assistant head coach	Frank Smith	6th	19	Old Dominion ('88)	Alexandria, Virginia, United States
Assistant coach	Josh Postorino	2nd	8	Dayton ('99)	Clearwater, Florida, United States
Director of Operations	Michael Morrell	1st	1	Milligan College ('05)	
Video Services	Andy Farrell	1st	0	Dayton ('07)	Richmond, Virginia, United States
Graduate Assistant	Adam Gordon	1st	0	Tampa ('06)	Ocala, Florida, United States

=== Players ===
No.	Name	Ht.	Wt.	Position	Year	Hometown
03	Anderson, Zavier	5' 09"	160	PG	SO	Greenville, South Carolina, United States
10	Baciu, Catalin	7' 02"	230	C	FR	Cluj-Napoca, Romania
04	Baize, Jonah	6' 06"	205	F	SO	Evansville, Indiana, United States
35	Booker, Trevor	6' 07"	240	F	JR	Whitmire, South Carolina, United States
45	Grant, Jerai	6' 08"	220	F	SO	Bowie, Maryland, United States
21	Narcisse, Brian	6' 06"	200	F	FR	North Augusta, South Carolina, United States
22	Oglesby, Terrence	6' 02"	190	G	SO	Kongsberg, Norway
55	Petrukonis, Karolis	6' 11"	260	C	JR	Trakai, Lithuania
15	Potter, David	6' 06"	205	F	JR	Severn, Maryland, United States
01	Rivers, K.C.	6' 02"	215	G	SR	Charlotte, North Carolina, United States
05	Smith, Tanner	6' 05"	205	SG	FR	Alpharetta, Georgia, United States
02	Stitt, Demontez	6' 02"	150	PG	SO	Matthews, North Carolina, United States
12	Sykes, Raymond	6' 09"	220	F	SR	Jacksonville, Florida, United States
44	Yanutola, Jesse	6' 04"	215	F	SR	Tega Cay, South Carolina, United States
11	Young, Andre	5' 09"	160	PG	FR	Albany, Georgia, United States

=== 2009 commitments ===
College recruiting information
Name	Hometown	School	Height	Weight	Commit date
Devin Booker; C	Union, SC	Union (SC)	6 ft 7 in (2.01 m)	220 lb (100 kg)	Mar 25, 2007
Devin Booker; C	Recruit ratings: Scout: Rivals: (89)				
Donte Hill; G	Virginia Beach, VA	Norfolk Collegiate School (VA)	6 ft 4 in (1.93 m)	200 lb (91 kg)	Aug 9, 2008
Donte Hill; G	Recruit ratings: Scout: Rivals: (85)				
Milton Jennings; PF	Summerville, SC	Pinewood Prep (SC)	6 ft 9 in (2.06 m)	200 lb (91 kg)	Apr 9, 2008
Milton Jennings; PF	Recruit ratings: Scout: Rivals: (95)				
Noel Johnson; SG	Fayetteville, GA	Fayette County High School (GA)	6 ft 7 in (2.01 m)	180 lb (82 kg)	Jun 19, 2009
Noel Johnson; SG	Recruit ratings: Scout: Rivals: (95)				
Overall recruit ranking: Scout: 22
Note: In many cases, Scout, Rivals, 247Sports, On3, and ESPN may conflict in their listings of height and weight.; In these cases, the average was taken. ESPN grades are on a 100-point scale.; Sources: "Clemson Basketball Commitments". Rivals.; "2009 Clemson Basketball Commits". Scout.; "ESPN". ESPN.; "Scout.com Team Recruiting Rankings". Scout.; "2009 Team Ranking". Rivals.

== Schedule and results ==
Date time, TV	Rank^{#}	Opponent^{#}	Result	Record	Site (attendance) city, state
Exhibition
Nov 6*; 7:30 pm		USC Aiken; Exhibition	W 94–60		Littlejohn Coliseum (3,000); Clemson, SC
Regular Season
Nov 14*; 9:30 pm, CSS		vs. Hofstra; Charleston Classic • Game 4	W 98–69	1–0	Carolina First Arena (4,582); Charleston, SC
Nov 15*; 8:19 pm, CSS		vs. TCU; Charleston Classic • Game 8	W 70–58	2–0	Carolina First Arena (1,571); Charleston, SC
Nov 16*; 4:00 pm, CSS		vs. Temple; Charleston Classic • Game 11	W 76–72	3–0	Carolina First Arena (3,026); Charleston, SC
Nov 19*; 7:30 pm, ACC Select		Wofford	W 93–40	4–0	Littlejohn Coliseum (7,509); Clemson, SC
Nov 22*; 7:00 pm, CBS All-Access		at Charlotte	W 71–70	5–0	Halton Arena (9,105); Charlotte, NC
Nov 25*; 8:00 pm		Savannah State	W 81–49	6–0	Littlejohn Coliseum (6,595); Clemson, SC
Nov 28*; 7:30 pm, ACC Select		Presbyterian	W 79–58	7–0	Littlejohn Coliseum (9,238); Clemson, SC
Dec 2*; 7:30 pm, ESPN2		at Illinois; ACC–Big Ten Challenge	W 76–74	8–0	Assembly Hall (14,741); Champaign, IL
Dec 7*; 3:00 pm, ACC Select		Liberty	W 80–75	9–0	Littlejohn Coliseum (6,657); Clemson, SC
Dec 13*; 2:00 pm, ACC Select		SC State	W 90–63	10–0	Littlejohn Coliseum (5,927); Clemson, SC
Dec 16*; 7:00 pm, ACC Select	No. 25	North Florida	W 76–36	11–0	Littlejohn Coliseum (5,892); Clemson, SC
Dec 21; 7:45 pm, FSN	No. 25	at Miami (FL)	W 91–72	12–0 (1–0)	BankUnited Center (4,755); Coral Gables, FL
Dec 30*; 7:00 pm, FSN	No. 20	at South Carolina; Carolina-Clemson Rivalry	W 98–87	13–0	Colonial Life Arena (16,168); Columbia, SC
Jan 3*; 4:00 pm, ACC Select	No. 20	East Carolina	W 79–66	14–0	Littlejohn Coliseum (8,223); Clemson, SC
Jan 6*; 9:00 pm, FSN	No. 12	Alabama	W 66–59	15–0	Littlejohn Coliseum (10,000); Clemson, SC
Jan 10; Noon, Raycom	No. 12	NC State	W 63–51	16–0 (2–0)	Littlejohn Coliseum (10,000); Clemson, SC
Jan 17; 3:30 pm, ABC	No. 10	No. 2 Wake Forest	L 68–78	16–1 (2–1)	Littlejohn Coliseum (10,000); Clemson, SC
Jan 21; 9:00 pm, ESPN	No. 10	at No. 5 North Carolina	L 70–94	16–2 (2–2)	Dean Smith Center (21,750); Chapel Hill, NC
Jan 25; 7:45 pm, FSN	No. 10	Georgia Tech	W 73–59	17–2 (3–2)	Littlejohn Coliseum (8,000); Clemson, SC
Jan 29; 7:00 pm, ESPN2	No. 12	at Virginia Tech	W 86–82	18–2 (4–2)	Cassell Coliseum (9,847); Blacksburg, VA
Feb 4; 9:00 pm, ESPN	No. 10	No. 4 Duke	W 74–47	19–2 (5–2)	Littlejohn Coliseum (10,000); Clemson, SC
Feb 7; 7:00 pm, Raycom	No. 10	Florida State	L 61–64	19–3 (5–3)	Littlejohn Coliseum (10,000); Clemson, SC
Feb 10; 9:00 pm, FSN	No. 12	at Boston College	W 87–77	20–3 (6–3)	Conte Forum (6,126); Chestnut Hill, MA
Feb 15; 1:00 pm, Raycom	No. 12	at Virginia	L 81–85 ^{OT}	20–4 (6–4)	John Paul Jones Arena (10,971); Charlottesville, VA
Feb 17; 7:30 pm, ESPN2	No. 13	Maryland	W 93–64	21–4 (7–4)	Littlejohn Coliseum (9,700); Clemson, SC
Feb 22; 1:00 pm, Raycom	No. 13	at Georgia Tech	W 81–73	22–4 (8–4)	Alexander Memorial Coliseum (8,339); Atlanta, GA
Feb 25; 7:30 pm, ESPN2	No. 12	Virginia Tech	L 77–80	22–5 (8–5)	Littlejohn Coliseum (9,728); Clemson, SC
Feb 28; 2:00 pm, Raycom	No. 12	at No. 23 Florida State	L 66–73	22–6 (8–6)	Donald L. Tucker Center (12,100); Tallahassee, FL
Mar 3; 7:00 pm, Raycom	No. 18	Virginia; Senior Night	W 75–57	23–6 (9–6)	Littlejohn Coliseum (8,150); Clemson, SC
Mar 8; 6:00 pm, FSN	No. 18	at No. 10 Wake Forest	L 88–96	23–7 (9–7)	LJVM Coliseum (14,665); Winston-Salem, NC
ACC Tournament
Mar 12; 2:00 pm, Raycom	(5) No. 17	vs. (12) Georgia Tech; First Round	L 81–86	23–8	Georgia Dome (26,352); Atlanta, GA
NCAA Tournament
Mar 19*; 7:10 pm, CBS	(7 S) No. 24	vs. (10 S) Michigan; First Round	L 59–62	23–9	Sprint Center (17,398); Kansas City, MO
*Non-conference game. ^{#}Rankings from AP Poll. (#) Tournament seedings in parentheses. All times are in Eastern Time.

== Player statistics ==
Finals Stats

#	Name	GP	GS	Min	FG%	3PT%	FT%	R/G	A/G	STL	BLK	PTS/G
35	Booker, Trevor	32	32	30.7	.571	.409	.707	9.7	1.7	47	63	15.3
01	Rivers, K. C.	32	32	31.0	.449	.392	.667	6.0	1.6	55	14	14.2
22	Oglesby, Terrence	32	31	25.8	.375	.388	.845	1.7	1.8	28	1	13.2
02	Stitt, Demontez	32	32	25.9	.413	.273	.673	2.4	3.8	48	14	8.7
12	Sykes, Raymond	32	31	21.7	.578	.000	.557	5.1	0.7	20	32	7.9
15	Potter, David	32	0	17.6	.380	.365	.756	2.2	1.3	19	7	4.9
45	Grant, Jerai	32	1	14.6	.644	.000	.647	3.2	0.5	12	45	4.7
11	Young, Andre	32	0	14.9	.377	.390	.632	0.8	2.1	31	1	4.4
05	Smith, Tanner	32	0	13.2	.448	.357	.667	1.8	1.1	29	6	3.6
10	Baciu, Catalin	9	0	4.9	.400	.000	.400	2.1	0.4	3	2	2.0
21	Narcisse, Bryan	16	0	4.2	.533	.000	.667	0.8	0.3	2	1	1.5
44	Yanutola, Jesse	7	1	2.0	.200	.000	.500	1.1	0.3	2	0	0.4
55	Petrukonis, Karolis	6	0	4.5	.200	.000	.000	1.0	0.5	1	0	0.3
03	Anderson, Zavier	7	0	1.6	.500	.000	.000	0.4	0.0	1	1	0.3
04	Baize, Jonah	4	0	1.8	.000	.000	.000	0.3	0.3	0	0	0.0
Clemson Totals					.463	.374	.688	37.2	14.9	298	187	78.3
Opponent Totals					.431	.359	.666	35.2	13.3	243	106	68.0

== Awards and honors ==
Trevor Booker

- Charleston Classic Most Valuable Player.
- ACC Player of the Week, November 17, 2008
- Naismith College Player of the Year Mid-Season Candidate
- Second Team, All District, District 2, National Association of Basketball Coaches
- First Team, All-District, District III, United States Basketball Writers Association
- Second Team, All-ACC Team
- All-ACC Defensive Team

K.C. Rivers

- ACC Player of the Week, December 22, 2008, February 2, 2009
- Honorabe Mention, All-ACC Team

Tanner Smith

- ACC All-Academic Team (To be eligible for consideration, a student-athlete must have earned a 3.00 grade point average for the previous semester and maintained a 3.00 cumulative average during his academic career.)

Oliver Purnell, head coach

- Henry Iba Award Finalist
- Coach of the Year, District III, United States Basketball Writers Association

Ron Bradley, associate head coach

- Assistant coach-of-the-Year Semi-Finalist, BasketballScoop.com

== Rankings ==
Ranking movements Legend: ██ Increase in ranking ██ Decrease in ranking — = Not ranked
	Week																			
Poll	Pre	1	2	3	4	5	6	7	8	9	10	11	12	13	14	15	16	17	18	Final
AP	—	—	—	—	—	25	22	20	12	10	10	12	10	12	13	12	18	17	24	Not released
Coaches	—	—	—	—	—	25	20	16	11	9	9	11	10	11	13	13	19	18	21	—

== Final season notes ==
=== Team notes ===
Clemson finished the season with a 23–9 record for a .719 winning percentage. This marks the fifth consecutive year that Clemson has improved its winning percentage from the previous year. Head Coach Oliver Purnell joins former Georgia Tech coach Bobby Cremins as the only coaches in ACC history to take a program to a better winning percentage in five consecutive years. Cremins did it from 1980 to 1981 through the 1986–87 season. The team finished the year with 23 wins, tied for the fifth highest total in school history. The .719 winning percentage ranks in a tie for fourth best in school history and the best since the 1989–90 team was 24–8 for a .750 winning percentage. The 23 victories gave Clemson at least 20 wins for the third straight year, a first in Clemson history. Clemson has 72 wins over the last three years, third among ACC teams behind North Carolina and Duke.

Clemson finished the year ranked 24th in the final Associated Press poll. It marks the second consecutive year Clemson has been ranked in the final AP poll, the first time in history Clemson has finished in the top 25 in any poll in consecutive years. Clemson was ranked in the AP poll for 14 consecutive weeks and in the USA Today poll for 13 consecutive weeks, the second longest streak of weeks in the top 25 in the same season in Clemson history and most since 1996–97 team was ranked in all 19 polls. Clemson reached a high ranking of No. 9 in the USA Today poll on Feb 9, the highest ranking for the program since the 1997–98 season.

Clemson won 10 games away from home, including seven on the opponent's home court. The 10 wins away from home were the most since the 1996–97 team won a record 11. The seven road wins were the most since the 1986–87 team won eight on the opponent's home court. The Tigers posted a 4–4 ACC road record this year, the most ACC road wins in a season for the Clemson program since 1996–97.

=== Individual notes ===
Clemson's senior class of K.C. Rivers, Raymond Sykes and Jesse Yanutola finished their careers with 91 victories, a Clemson record for a four-year class. The previous record was 84. The class also had a record 33 ACC regular season wins and 12 ACC road wins. The .679 winning percentage is second best in Clemson history behind the seniors of 1979–80.

- Junior Trevor Booker led the ACC in field goal percentage and rebounding, the first ACC player to do that since Tim Duncan in 1996–97. He is the first ACC underclassman to do it since Dale Davis of Clemson in 1989–90. Booker finished his junior year with 1,239 points, the fifth highest total in Clemson history for a junior. He finished the year seventh in school history in career rebounds with 792 and will need just 208 rebounds his senior year to become the third player in Clemson history with at least 1000 rebounds, joining Tree Rollins and Dale Davis. Booker is already first in Clemson history in rebounds among players 6–7 or shorter. Booker will enter his senior year with a .576 field goal percentage for his career, fifth best in school history. He also stands fifth in career blocked shots with 204.
- Senior K.C. Rivers leaves Clemson as the school's career leader in victories (91), ACC wins (35), three-point goals (281) and tied for first in games played (134). He is third in steals (210), fourth in double figure scoring games (90), fourth in field goals (625), sixth in career scoring (1684), and 11th in rebounding (721). He is first among Clemson players 6–5 and under in rebounding. Rivers finished his career with 210 steals and 174 turnovers, just the second player in Clemson history to complete a career with more steals than turnovers (Sean Tyson 1987–91).
- Freshman guard Andre Young finished the year with a 2.87/1 assist/turnover ratio (66/23), the second best assist/turnover ratio in Clemson history.
- Senior Raymond Sykes finished his career with 102 career blocked shots, ninth best in Clemson history. He played in 85 victories, second on the Clemson all-time list.
- Sophomore Terrence Oglesby made 92 three-point goals in 2008–09, fourth highest single season total in school history. Oglesby enters his junior year sixth in school history in three-point goals with 177.
- Sophomore Demontez Stitt took 18 charges this year, tied for sixth best in Clemson history and most by any Clemson player since Jerry Pryor had 21 in 1987–88.

== See also ==
- 2008–09 Atlantic Coast Conference men's basketball season
- ACC men's basketball tournament
- 2008–09 NCAA Division I men's basketball season
- 2009 NCAA Division I men's basketball tournament
