= 2008–09 Miami Hurricanes men's basketball team =

American college basketball season

2008–09 Miami Hurricanes men's basketball

NIT, 2nd round
- Conference: Atlantic Coast Conference
- Record: 19-13 (7-9 ACC)
- Head coach: Frank Haith
- Home arena: BankUnited Center

2008–09 ACC men's basketball standings
	Conf.				Overall
Team	W		L	PCT	W		L	PCT
No. 2 North Carolina	13	–	3	.813	34	–	4	.895
No. 6 Duke†	11	–	5	.688	30	–	7	.811
No. 12 Wake Forest	11	–	5	.688	24	–	7	.774
No. 16 Florida State	10	–	6	.625	25	–	10	.714
No. 24 Clemson	9	–	7	.563	23	–	9	.719
Boston College	9	–	7	.563	22	–	12	.647
Maryland	7	–	9	.438	21	–	14	.600
Virginia Tech	7	–	9	.438	19	–	15	.559
Miami (FL)	7	–	9	.438	19	–	13	.594
NC State	6	–	10	.375	16	–	14	.533
Virginia	4	–	12	.250	10	–	18	.357
Georgia Tech	2	–	14	.125	12	–	19	.387
† 2009 ACC tournament winner Rankings from AP Poll

The 2008–09 Miami Hurricanes men's basketball team represented the University of Miami during the 2008–09 NCAA Division I men's basketball season. The Hurricanes, led by head coach Frank Haith, played their home games at the BankUnited Center and were members of the Atlantic Coast Conference.

They finished the season with a 19–13 record. The Hurricanes were eliminated in the ACC tournament first round by Virginia Tech 65–47. Their season ended with a 74–60 loss to Florida in the 2009 NIT.
