= 2008–09 Big 12 Conference men's basketball season =

- League: NCAA Division I
- Sport: Basketball
- Duration: December 30, 2008 through March 8, 2009
- Teams: 12

Regular Season
- Regular Season Champion: Kansas (14–2)
- Season MVP: Blake Griffin

Tournament
- Champions: Missouri
- Finals MVP: DeMarre Carroll

Basketball seasons
- 2007–08 2009–10

2008–09 Big 12 men's basketball standings
	Conf.				Overall
Team	W		L	PCT	W		L	PCT
No. 14 Kansas	14	–	2	.875	27	–	8	.771
No. 7 Oklahoma	13	–	3	.813	30	–	6	.833
No. 9 Missouri †	12	–	4	.750	31	–	7	.816
Kansas State	9	–	7	.563	22	–	12	.647
Texas	9	–	7	.563	23	–	12	.657
Texas A&M	9	–	7	.563	24	–	10	.706
Oklahoma State	9	–	7	.563	23	–	12	.657
Nebraska	8	–	8	.500	18	–	13	.581
Baylor	5	–	11	.313	24	–	15	.615
Iowa State	4	–	12	.250	15	–	17	.469
Texas Tech	3	–	13	.188	14	–	19	.424
Colorado	1	–	15	.063	9	–	22	.290
† 2009 Big 12 Tournament winner Rankings from AP poll

The 2008–09 Big 12 Conference men's basketball season marks the 13th season of Big 12 Conference basketball.

== Preseason ==
=== Big 12 coaches poll ===
Rank	Team	Votes
1	Oklahoma (3)	109
2	Texas (4)	107
3	Baylor (2)	103
3	Kansas (3)	103
5	Texas A&M	79
6	Oklahoma State	69
7	Missouri	51
8	Kansas State	50
9	Nebraska	49
10	Texas Tech	39
11	Iowa State	20
12	Colorado	13

=== All-Big 12 players ===
- Curtis Jerrells, Baylor
- Sherron Collins, Kansas
- Blake Griffin, Oklahoma
- A. J. Abrams, Texas
- Damion James, Texas

Player of the Year

- Blake Griffin, Oklahoma

Newcomer of the Year

- Mario Little, Kansas

Freshman of the Year

- Willie Warren, Oklahoma

== Regular season ==
=== Rankings ===
AP Poll	Pre	Wk 1	Wk 2	Wk 3	Wk 4	Wk 5	Wk 6	Wk 7	Wk 8	Wk 9	Wk 10	Wk 11	Wk 12	Wk 13	Wk 14	Wk 15	Wk 16	Wk 17	Wk 18
Baylor	RV	RV	RV	24	22	21	21	19	23	21	RV	RV							
Colorado																			
Iowa State																			
Kansas	24	24	22	RV	25	RV	RV		RV	RV	RV	RV	21	16	15	15	9	11	14
Kansas State													RV	RV		RV			
Missouri					RV	RV	25	RV	RV	RV		RV	RV	17	11	11	15	14	9
Nebraska				RV															
Oklahoma	12	12	11	6	5	4	4	4	6	6	6	4	2	2	2	3	4	6	7
Oklahoma State			RV							RV							RV	RV	RV
Texas	7	7	6	8	6	5	9	8	7	11	14	11	16	RV	RV	25	RV	RV	RV
Texas A&M	RV	RV	RV	RV	RV	RV	RV	RV	RV	RV								RV	
Texas Tech																			

=== In-season honors ===
Players of the week

Throughout the conference regular season, the Big 12 offices name a player of the week each Monday.

Date	Player(s)
Nov. 17	Blake Griffin, Oklahoma, F, So.
Nov. 24	Blake Griffin, Oklahoma, F, So.
Dec. 1	Blake Griffin, Oklahoma, F, So.
Dec. 8	Craig Brackins, Iowa State, F, So. A. J. Abrams, Texas, G, Sr.
Dec. 15	Cory Higgins, Colorado, G, So.
Dec. 22	James Anderson, Oklahoma State, G/F, So.
Dec. 29	Craig Brackins, Iowa State, F, So.
Jan. 5	Sherron Collins, Kansas, G, Jr.
Jan. 12	Blake Griffin, Oklahoma, F, So.
Jan. 19	Austin Johnson, Oklahoma, G, Sr.
Jan. 26	Craig Brackins, Iowa State, F, So.
Feb. 2	Denis Clemente, Kansas State, G, Jr.
Feb. 9	DeMarre Carroll, Missouri, F, Sr.
Feb. 16	Blake Griffin, Oklahoma, F, So.
Feb. 23	Sherron Collins, Kansas, G, Jr. James Anderson, Oklahoma State, G, So.
Mar. 2	Sherron Collins, Kansas, G, Jr.
Mar. 9	Blake Griffin, Oklahoma, F, So.

== Conference honors ==
Award	Recipient(s)
Player of the Year	Blake Griffin, Oklahoma, F, So.
Coach of the Year	Bill Self, Kansas
Defensive Players of the Year	Cole Aldrich, Kansas, C, So. J.T. Tiller, Missouri, G, Jr.
Newcomer of the year	Denis Clemente, Kansas State, G, Jr.
Freshman of the Year	Willie Warren, Oklahoma, G, Fr.**
Sixth Man Awards	LaceDarius Dunn, Baylor, G, So. Matt Lawrence, Missouri, G, Sr.
All-Big 12 First Team	Craig Brackins, Iowa State, F, So. Cole Aldrich, Kansas, C, So. Sherron Collins, Kansas, G, Jr.** DeMarre Carroll, Missouri, F, Sr. Blake Griffin, Oklahoma, F, So.**
All-Big 12 Second Team	Denis Clemente, Kansas State, G, Jr. Willie Warren, Oklahoma, G, Fr. James Anderson, Oklahoma State, G/F, So. A. J. Abrams, Texas, G, Sr. Damion James, Texas, G/F, Jr.
All-Big 12 Third Team	Curtis Jerrells, Baylor, G, Sr. Cory Higgins, Colorado, G, So. Leo Lyons, Missouri, F, Sr. Ade Dagunduro, Nebraska, G, Sr. Byron Eaton, Oklahoma State, G, Sr. Josh Carter, Texas A&M, G/F, Sr.
All-Big 12 Honorable Mention	LaceDarius Dunn (Baylor); Kevin Rogers (Baylor); Jacob Pullen (Kansas State); J. T. Tiller (Missouri); Austin Johnson (Oklahoma); Terrel Harris (Oklahoma State); John Roberson (Texas Tech); Alan Voskuil (Texas Tech)
Big 12 All-Defensive Team	Cole Aldrich, Kansas, C, So. J. T. Tiller, Missouri, G, Jr.** Ade Dagunduro, Nebraska, G, Sr. Terrel Harris, Oklahoma State, G, Sr. Justin Mason, Texas, G, Jr. Derrick Roland, Texas A&M, G, Jr.
Big 12 All-Rookie Team	Marcus Morris, Kansas, F, Fr. Tyshawn Taylor, Kansas, G, Fr.** Denis Clemente, Kansas State, G, Jr.** Zaire Taylor, Missouri, G, Jr. Willie Warren, Oklahoma, G, Fr.**

** – Unanimous Selection

== National awards & honors ==
=== Player of the year ===
Blake Griffin, Oklahoma

- Oscar Robertson Trophy
- CBSSports.com Player of the Year
- Sporting News Player of the Year
- Sports Illustrated Player of the Year
- Fox Sports Player of the Year
- Adolph Rupp Trophy

=== Coach of the year ===
Bill Self, Kansas

- AP Coach of the Year
- USBWA Henry Iba Award
- CBSSports.com Coach of the Year
- Sporting News Coach of the Year
- Fox Sports Coach of the Year
- CBS/Chevrolet Coach of the Year

Mike Anderson, Missouri

- NABC Co-Coach of the Year

=== All-District teams ===
==== USBWA ====
USBWA All-District 6

- Blake Griffin, Oklahoma
- Craig Brackins, Iowa State
- Cole Aldrich, Kansas
- Sherron Collins, Kansas
- Denis Clemente, Kansas State
- DeMarre Carroll, Missouri
- Leo Lyons, Missouri
- Willie Warren, Oklahoma
- James Anderson, Oklahoma State

USBWA All-District 7

- Curtis Jerrells, Baylor
- A.J. Abrams, Texas
- Damion James, Texas
- Josh Carter, Texas A&M
- John Roberson, Texas Tech

==== NABC ====
NABC All-District 8
First Team

- Craig Brackins, Iowa State
- Cole Aldrich, Kansas
- Sherron Collins, Kansas
- DeMarre Carroll, Missouri
- Blake Griffin, Oklahoma

Second Team

- Curtis Jerrells, Baylor
- Willie Warren, Oklahoma
- James Anderson, Oklahoma State
- A.J. Abrams, Texas
- Damion James, Texas

=== All-Americans ===
Blake Griffin, Oklahoma

- USBWA, First Team
- CBSSports.com, First Team
- Sporting News, First Team
- Sports Illustrated, First Team
- Fox Sports, First Team
- Adolph Rupp Award, First Team
- Associated Press, First Team

Sherron Collins, Kansas

- USBWA, Second Team
- CBSSports.com, Second Team
- Fox Sports, Second Team
- Sporting News, Third Team
- Associated Press, Third Team

Craig Brackins, Iowa State

- Associated Press, Honorable Mention

Cole Aldrich, Kansas

- Associated Press, Honorable Mention

DeMarre Carroll, Missouri

- Associated Press, Honorable Mention

==== Freshman teams ====
Tyshawn Taylor, Kansas

- CBSSports.com, First Team

Willie Warren, Oklahoma

- CBSSports.com, First Team
- Fox Sports, First Team

=== NCAA All-Regional teams ===
South Regional

- Blake Griffin, Oklahoma

West Regional

- DeMarre Carroll, Missouri
- J.T. Tiller, Missouri

Midwest Regional

- Cole Aldrich, Kansas

== Statistical leaders ==
Statistics shown cover the entire 2008–09 season.

=== Individual ===
Scoring
Name	School	Pts	PPG
Griffin, Blake	OU	794	22.7
Brackins, Craig	ISU	645	20.2
Collins, Sherron	KU	661	18.9
Anderson, James	OSU	638	18.2
Higgins, Cory	CU	538	17.4
Abrams, A.J.	UT	580	16.6
Carroll, DeMarre	MU	629	16.6
Jerrells, Curtis	BU	621	16.3
Dunn, LaceDarius	BU	596	15.7
James, Damion	UT	540	15.4

Rebounding
Name	School	TOT	RPG
Griffin, Blake	OU	504	14.4
Aldrich, Cole	KU	387	11.1
Brackins, Craig	ISU	303	9.5
James, Damion	UT	322	9.2
Rogers, Kevin	BU	288	7.6
Elonu, Chinemelu	TAMU	249	7.3
Muonelo, Obi	OSU	252	7.2
Carroll, DeMarre	MU	273	7.2
Davis, Bryan	TAMU	222	6.5
Moses, Marshall	OSU	196	6.1

Assists
Name	School	TOT	APG
Roberson, John	TTU	212	6.42
Eaton, Byron	OSU	199	5.69
Garrett, Diante	ISU	161	5.03
Collins, Sherron	KU	174	4.97
Jerrells, Curtis	BU	186	4.89
Mason, Justin	UT	141	4.03
Johnson, Austin	OU	140	3.89
Miller, Cookie	NU	109	3.63
Tiller, J.T.	MU	138	3.63
Clemente, Denis	KSU	112	3.50

Steals
Name	School	TOT	SPG
Eaton, Byron	OSU	77	2.20
Higgins, Cory	CU	59	1.90
Tiller, J.T.	MU	68	1.79
Harris, Terrel	OSU	61	1.74
Pullen, Jacob	KSU	54	1.59
Dugat, Henry	BU	59	1.55
Carroll, DeMarre	MU	59	1.55
Jerrells, Curtis	BU	59	1.55
Miller, Cookie	NU	45	1.50
Harley, Steve	NU	45	1.4

Blocks
Name	School	TOT	BPG
Aldrich, Cole	KU	94	2.69
Elonu, Chinemelu	TAMU	53	1.56
Davis, Bryan	TAMU	46	1.35
Atchley, Connor	UT	45	1.32
Griffin, Blake	OU	41	1.17
Griffin, Taylor	OU	36	1.00
Acy, Quincy	BU	34	1.00
Pittman, Dexter	UT	33	0.94
Samuels, Jamar	KSU	32	0.94
Brackins, Craig	ISU	30	0.94

Field Goals
Name	School	FG%
Griffin, Blake	OU	.654
Aldrich, Cole	KU	.598
Carroll, DeMarre	MU	.558
Rogers, Kevin	BU	.557
Anderson, James	OSU	.482
Higgins, Cory	CU	.476
Brackins, Craig	ISU	.475
James, Damion	UT	.468
Collins, Sherron	KU	.434
Jerrells, Curtis	BU	.431

Min. 5 FGM/Gm

3-Pt Field Goals
Name	School	3FG%
Voskuil, Alan	TTU	.435
Holmes, B.J.	TAMU.	.415
Brown, Fred	KSU	.415
Lawrence, Matt	MU	.408
Anderson, James	OSU	.408
Velander, Paul	NU	.400
Carter, Josh	TAMU	.399
Page, Keiton	OSU	.399
Muonelo, Obi	OSU	.398
Abrams, A.J.	UT	.396

Min 1.5 3Pt FGM/Gm.

Free Throws
Name	School	FT%
Voskuil, Alan	TTU	.896
Abrams, A.J.	UT	.848
Carter, Josh	TAMU	.847
Higgins, Cory	CU	.830
Anderson, James	OSU	.829
Roberson, John	TTU	.829
Dunn, LaceDarius	BU	.821
Clemente, Denis	KSU	.798
Collins, Sherron	KU	.795
Aldrich, Cole	KU	.792

Min 2.5 Per Gm

== Postseason ==
=== Big Twelve tournament ===
First Round; Wednesday, March 11
8	Nebraska	49
9	Baylor	65
5	Texas	67
12	Colorado	56
7	Oklahoma State	81
10	Iowa State	67
6	Texas A&M	83
11	Texas Tech	88

Quarterfinals; Thursday, March 12
1	#11 Kansas	64
9	Baylor	71
4	Kansas State	58
5	Texas	61
2	#6 Oklahoma	70
7	Oklahoma State	71
3	#14 Missouri	81
11	Texas Tech	60

Semifinals; Friday, March 13
9	Baylor	76
5	Texas	70
7	Oklahoma State	59
3	#14 Missouri	67

Finals; Saturday, March 14
9	Baylor	60
3	#14 Missouri	73

=== NCAA tournament ===
School	Region	Seed	Round 1	Round 2	Sweet 16	Elite Eight	Final Four	Championship
Oklahoma	South	2	15 Morgan St., W 82–54	10 Michigan, W 73–63	3 Syracuse, W 84–71	1 North Carolina, L 60–72		
Missouri	West	3	14 Cornell, W 78–59	6 Marquette, W 83–79	2 Memphis, W 102–91	1 Connecticut, L 75–82		
Kansas	Midwest	3	14 North Dakota State, W 84–74	11 Dayton, W 60–43	2 Michigan State, L 62–67			
Texas	East	7	10 Minnesota, W 76–62	2 Duke, L 69–74				
Oklahoma State	East	8	9 Tennessee, W 77–75	1 Pittsburgh, L 76–84				
Texas A&M	West	9	8 BYU, W 79–66	1 Connecticut, L 66–92				

=== National Invitation Tournament ===
School	Seed	Round 1	Round 2	Quarterfinals	Semifinals	Championship
Baylor	3	6 Georgetown, W 74–72	2 Virginia Tech, W 84–66	1 Auburn, W 74–72	1 San Diego St., W 76–62	2 Penn St., L 63–69
Kansas State	4	5 Illinois St., W 83–79 (OT)	1 San Diego St., L 52–70			
Nebraska	6	3 New Mexico, L 71–83				
