= 2009 Big 12 men's basketball tournament =

- Classification: Division I
- Season: 2008–09
- Teams: 12
- Site: Ford Center; Oklahoma City, Oklahoma
- Champions: Missouri (1st title)
- Winning coach: Mike Anderson (1st title)
- MVP: DeMarre Carroll (Missouri)
- Attendance: 94,614 (overall); 15,321 (championship)
- Top scorer: LaceDarius Dunn (Baylor) (69 points)
- Television: ESPN, Big 12 Network, ESPN2

2008–09 Big 12 men's basketball standings
	Conf.				Overall
Team	W		L	PCT	W		L	PCT
No. 14 Kansas	14	–	2	.875	27	–	8	.771
No. 7 Oklahoma	13	–	3	.813	30	–	6	.833
No. 9 Missouri †	12	–	4	.750	31	–	7	.816
Kansas State	9	–	7	.563	22	–	12	.647
Texas	9	–	7	.563	23	–	12	.657
Texas A&M	9	–	7	.563	24	–	10	.706
Oklahoma State	9	–	7	.563	23	–	12	.657
Nebraska	8	–	8	.500	18	–	13	.581
Baylor	5	–	11	.313	24	–	15	.615
Iowa State	4	–	12	.250	15	–	17	.469
Texas Tech	3	–	13	.188	14	–	19	.424
Colorado	1	–	15	.063	9	–	22	.290
† 2009 Big 12 Tournament winner Rankings from AP poll

The 2009 Phillips 66 Big 12 Men's Basketball Championship was the 13th edition of the Big 12 Conference's championship tournament held at the Ford Center in Oklahoma City from March 11 until March 14, 2009. The University of Missouri Tigers defeated the Baylor University Bears 73–60 in the championship game to claim their first Big 12 Tournament title for Mizzou.

== Seeding ==
The Tournament consisted of a 12 team single-elimination tournament with the top 4 seeds receiving a bye.

2009 Big 12 Men's Basketball Tournament seeds
Seed	School	Conf.	Over.	Tiebreaker
1	Kansas ‡#	14–2	27–8	
2	Oklahoma #	13–3	30–6	
3	Missouri #	12–4	31–7	
4	Kansas State #	9–7	22–12	
5	Texas	9–7	23–12	
6	Texas A&M	9–7	24–10	
7	Oklahoma State	9–7	23–12	
8	Nebraska	8–8	18–13	
9	Baylor	5–11	24–15	
10	Iowa State	4–12	15–17	
11	Texas Tech	3–13	14–19	
12	Colorado	1–15	9–22	
‡ – Big 12 Conference regular season champions, and tournament No. 1 seed. # – Received a single-bye in the conference tournament. Overall records include all games played in the Big 12 Conference tournament.

== Schedule ==
Session	Game	Time	Matchup	Television	Attendance
First Round – Wednesday, March 11
1	1	11:30 am	#9 Baylor 65 vs #8 Nebraska 49	Big 12 Network	15,413
1	2	2:00 pm	#5 Texas 67 vs #12 Colorado 56	Big 12 Network	15,413
2	3	6:00 pm	#7 Oklahoma State 81 vs #10 Iowa State 67	Big 12 Network	15,580
2	5	11:30 am	#11 Texas Tech 88 vs #6 Texas A&M 83	Big 12 Network	15,580
Quarterfinals – Thursday, March 12
3	5	11:30 am	#9 Baylor 71 vs #1 Kansas 64	ESPN2	14,909
3	6	2:00 pm	#5 Texas 61 vs #4 Kansas State 58	Big 12 Network	14,909
4	7	6:00 pm	#7 Oklahoma State 71 vs #2 Oklahoma 70	Big 12 Network	16,786
4	8	8:30 pm	#3 Missouri 81 vs #11 Texas Tech 60	ESPN2	16,786
Semifinals – Friday, March 13
5	9	6:00 pm	#9 Baylor 76 vs #5 Texas 70	Big 12 Network	16,605
5	10	8:30 pm	#3 Missouri 67 vs #7 Oklahoma State 59	Big 12 Network	16,605
Final – Saturday, March 14
6	11	5:00 pm	#3 Missouri 73 vs #9 Baylor 60	ESPN	15,321
Game times in CT. #-Rankings denote tournament seed

== Tournament bracket ==
First Round; Wednesday, March 11
8	Nebraska	49
9	Baylor	65
5	Texas	67
12	Colorado	56
7	Oklahoma State	81
10	Iowa State	67
6	Texas A&M	83
11	Texas Tech	88

Quarterfinals; Thursday, March 12
1	#11 Kansas	64
9	Baylor	71
4	Kansas State	58
5	Texas	61
2	#6 Oklahoma	70
7	Oklahoma State	71
3	#14 Missouri	81
11	Texas Tech	60

Semifinals; Friday, March 13
9	Baylor	76
5	Texas	70
7	Oklahoma State	59
3	#14 Missouri	67

Finals; Saturday, March 14
9	Baylor	60
3	#14 Missouri	73

== All-Tournament Team ==
Most Outstanding Player – DeMarre Carroll, Missouri

Player	Team	Position	Class
DeMarre Carroll	Missouri	Sr.	F
Kevin Rogers	Baylor	Sr.	F
Zaire Taylor	Missouri	Jr.	G
Dexter Pittman	Texas	Jr.	C
Mike Singletary	Texas Tech	So.	F

== See also ==
- 2009 Big 12 Conference women's basketball tournament
- 2009 NCAA Division I men's basketball tournament
- 2008–09 NCAA Division I men's basketball rankings
