= 2008–09 Oklahoma State Cowboys basketball team =

American college basketball season

2008–09 Oklahoma State Cowboys basketball

NCAA tournament, second round
- Conference: Big 12 Conference
- Record: 23–12 (9–7 Big 12)
- Head coach: Travis Ford
- Assistant coaches: Butch Pierre; Chris Ferguson; Steve Middleton
- Home arena: Gallagher-Iba Arena

2008–09 Big 12 men's basketball standings
	Conf.				Overall
Team	W		L	PCT	W		L	PCT
No. 14 Kansas	14	–	2	.875	27	–	8	.771
No. 7 Oklahoma	13	–	3	.813	30	–	6	.833
No. 9 Missouri †	12	–	4	.750	31	–	7	.816
Kansas State	9	–	7	.563	22	–	12	.647
Texas	9	–	7	.563	23	–	12	.657
Texas A&M	9	–	7	.563	24	–	10	.706
Oklahoma State	9	–	7	.563	23	–	12	.657
Nebraska	8	–	8	.500	18	–	13	.581
Baylor	5	–	11	.313	24	–	15	.615
Iowa State	4	–	12	.250	15	–	17	.469
Texas Tech	3	–	13	.188	14	–	19	.424
Colorado	1	–	15	.063	9	–	22	.290
† 2009 Big 12 Tournament winner Rankings from AP poll

The 2008–09 Oklahoma State Cowboys men's basketball team represented Oklahoma State University in the 2008–09 NCAA Division I men's basketball season. This was head coach Travis Ford's inaugural season at Oklahoma State. The Cowboys competed in the Big 12 Conference and played their home games at Gallagher-Iba Arena. They finished the season 23–12, 9–7 in Big 12 play. They lost in the semifinals of the 2009 Big 12 men's basketball tournament. They received an at–large bid to the 2009 NCAA Division I men's basketball tournament, earning an 8 seed in the East Region, where they advanced to the Second Round by defeating 9 seed Tennessee 77–75. The Cowboy's fell in the Second Round to 1 seed Pittsburgh.

== Pre-season ==
In the Big 12 preseason polls, released October 7, Oklahoma State was selected to finish sixth in the Big 12 coaches poll.

== Roster ==
#	Name	Height	Weight (lbs.)	Position	Class	Hometown	Previous Team(s)
0	Byron Eaton	5'11"	210	G	Sr.	Dallas, TX, U.S.	Lincoln HS
1	Terrel Harris	6'5"	205	G	Sr.	Garland, TX, U.S.	South Garland HS
2	Obi Muonelo	6'5"	220	G	Jr.	Edmond, OK, U.S.	Santa Fe HS
4	Anthony Brown	6'6"	225	F	Sr.	Brooklyn, NY, U.S.	Carl Albert State
12	Keiton Page	5'9"	170	G	Fr.	Pawnee, OK, U.S.	Pawnee HS
15	Nick Sidorakis	6'4"	185	G	Jr.	Jenks, OK, U.S.	Jenks HS
22	Teeng Akol	6'11"	220	G C	Fr.	Wian, South Sudan, South Sudan; Bradenton, Florida, U.S.	IMG Academy
23	James Anderson	6'6"	210	G	So.	Junction City, AR, U.S.	Junction City HS
25	Garrett Thomas	6'2"	180	G	Jr.	Edmond, OK, U.S.	Edmond Memorial HS
31	Blaine Booher	6'4"	180	G	Fr.	Oklahoma City, OK, U.S.	Putnam City HS
32	Ibrahima Thomas	6'11"	235	F C	So.	Merced, California, U.S.	Stone Ridge Christian HS
33	Marshall Moses	6'7"	255	F	So.	Aiken, SC, U.S.	The Patterson School
44	Malcoln Kirkland	6'7"	265	F	So.	Fort Smith, Arkansas, U.S.	Northside HS
45	Greg Hughes	6'8"	225	F	Fr.	Forney, TX, U.S.	
53	Nolan Cox	6'6"	200	G	Fr.	Highland Village, TX, U.S.	Marcus HS
55	Scott Warner	6'11"	220	C	So.	Berryhill, OK, U.S.	

== Schedule and results ==
- All times are Central

Date time, TV	Rank^{#}	Opponent^{#}	Result	Record	Site (attendance) city, state
Regular Season
11/14/2008*		UTSA	W 76–57	1–0	Gallagher-Iba Arena (9,733); Stillwater, OK
11/17/2008*		North Texas	W 100–88	2–0	Gallagher-Iba Arena (9,681); Stillwater, OK
11/20/2008*		Tulsa	W 91–73	3–0	Gallagher-Iba Arena (10,041); Stillwater, OK
11/23/2008*		Grambling State	W 91–60	4–0	Gallagher-Iba Arena (9,753); Stillwater, OK
11/27/2009*; 7:00pm		vs. Gonzaga	L 71–83	4–1	The Milk House (4,644); Bay Lake, Florida
11/28/2009*		vs. Michigan State	L 79–94	4–2	The Milk House (4,658); Bay Lake, Florida
11/30/2008*		vs. Siena	W 77–68	5–2	The Milk House (3,768); Bay Lake, Florida
12/4/2008*		at Washington	L 65–83	5–3	Bank of America Arena (7,789); Seattle, WA
12/14/2008*		at Texas A&M-Corpus Christi	W 82–59	6–3	American Bank Center (2,380); Corpus Christi, TX
12/17/2008*		Mercer	W 104–74	7–3	Gallagher-Iba Arena (6,427); Stillwater, OK
12/20/2008*		vs. Rhode Island; All-College Basketball Classic	W 86–82	8–1	Ford Center (8,502); Oklahoma City, OK
12/29/2008*		Arkansas State	W 76–53	9–3	Gallagher-Iba Arena (9,082); Stillwater, OK
1/3/2009*		Northwestern State	W 122–73	10–3	Gallagher-Iba Arena (9,831); Stillwater, OK
1/6/2009*		Savannah State	W 83–56	11–3	Gallagher-Iba Arena (8,054); Stillwater, OK
1/10/2009		Texas A&M	W 72–61	12–3 (1–0)	Gallagher-Iba Arena (10,264); Stillwater, OK
1/17/2009		at No. 21 Baylor	L 92–98 ^{OT}	12–4 (1–1)	Ferrell Center (8,651); Waco, Texas
1/21/2009		Missouri	L 95–97	12–5 (1–2)	Gallagher-Iba Arena (10,810); Stillwater, OK
1/24/2009		at Nebraska	W 76–74 ^{OT}	13–5 (2–2)	Bob Devaney Sports Center (11,287); Lincoln, Nebraska
1/26/2009		No. 4 Oklahoma	L 81–89	13–6 (2–3)	Gallagher-Iba Arena (10,500); Stillwater, OK
1/31/2009		at Texas A&M	L 64–76	13–7 (2–4)	Reed Arena (11,178); College Station, Texas
2/4/2009		Texas Tech	W 81–80	14–7 (3–4)	Gallagher-Iba Arena (9,749); Stillwater, OK
2/7/2009		at No. 21 Kansas	L 67–78	14–8 (3–5)	Allen Fieldhouse (16,300); Lawrence, Kansas
2/10/2009		at Texas	L 74–99	14–9 (3–6)	Frank Erwin Center (13,545); Austin, Texas
2/14/2009		Iowa State	W 86–67	15–9 (4–6)	Gallagher-Iba Arena (10,124); Stillwater, OK
2/18/2009		at Texas Tech	W 92–82	16–9 (5–6)	United Spirit Arena (10,055); Lubbock, Texas
2/21/2009		No. 22 Baylor	W 84–74	17–9 (6–6)	Gallagher-Iba Arena (9,637); Stillwater, OK
2/25/2009		at Colorado	W 76–55	18–9 (7–6)	CU Events Center (4,288); Boulder, Colorado
2/28/2009		No. 25 Texas	W 68–59	19–9 (8–6)	Gallagher-Iba Arena (12,745); Stillwater, OK
3/3/2009		No. 23 Kansas State	W 77–71	20–9 (9–6)	Gallagher-Iba Arena (12,106); Stillwater, OK
3/7/2009		at No. 4 Oklahoma	L 78–82	20–10 (9–7)	Lloyd Noble Center (12,483); Norman, Oklahoma
2009 Big 12 men's basketball tournament
3/11/2009	(7)	vs. (10) Iowa State; First Round	W 81–67	21–10	Ford Center (15,580); Oklahoma City
3/12/2009	(7)	vs. (2) No. 6 Oklahoma; Quarterfinals	W 71–70	22–10	Ford Center (16,786); Oklahoma City
3/13/2009; Big 12 Network	(7)	vs. (3) No. 14 Missouri; Semifinals	L 59–67	22–11	Ford Center (15,009); Oklahoma City
2009 NCAA Division I men's basketball tournament
3/20/2009; CBS	(8 E)	vs. (9 E) Tennessee; First Round	W 77–75	23–11	University of Dayton Arena (12,499); Dayton, Ohio
3/22/2009; 6:15pm, CBS	(8 E)	vs. (1 E) No. 4 Pittsburgh; Second Round	L 76–84	23–12	University of Dayton Arena (12,596); Dayton, Ohio
*Non-conference game. ^{#}Rankings from AP Poll. (#) Tournament seedings in parentheses.
