= 2008–09 Baylor Bears basketball team =

American college basketball season

2008–09 Baylor Bears men's basketball

National Invitation Tournament, Runner–Up
- Conference: Big 12
- South
- Record: 24–15 (5–11 Big 12)
- Head coach: Scott Drew
- Home arena: Ferrell Center

2008–09 Big 12 men's basketball standings
	Conf.				Overall
Team	W		L	PCT	W		L	PCT
No. 14 Kansas	14	–	2	.875	27	–	8	.771
No. 7 Oklahoma	13	–	3	.813	30	–	6	.833
No. 9 Missouri †	12	–	4	.750	31	–	7	.816
Kansas State	9	–	7	.563	22	–	12	.647
Texas	9	–	7	.563	23	–	12	.657
Texas A&M	9	–	7	.563	24	–	10	.706
Oklahoma State	9	–	7	.563	23	–	12	.657
Nebraska	8	–	8	.500	18	–	13	.581
Baylor	5	–	11	.313	24	–	15	.615
Iowa State	4	–	12	.250	15	–	17	.469
Texas Tech	3	–	13	.188	14	–	19	.424
Colorado	1	–	15	.063	9	–	22	.290
† 2009 Big 12 Tournament winner Rankings from AP poll

The 2008–09 Baylor Bears men's basketball team represented Baylor University in the 2008–09 NCAA Division I men's basketball season. The team's head coach was Scott Drew, who served his sixth year. Baylor played its home games in the Ferrell Center in Waco, Texas. The team finished the season as runner-up in the National Invitation Tournament (NIT), losing to Penn State in the championship game.

== Recruiting ==
College recruiting information
Name	Hometown	School	Height	Weight	Commit date
Quincy Acy; PF	Mesquite, TX	Horn HS	6 ft 8 in (2.03 m)	230 lb (100 kg)	Jun 25, 2008
Quincy Acy; PF	Recruit ratings: Scout: Rivals: (62)				
Artem Valov; PF	Poplar Bluff, MO	Three Rivers JC	6 ft 9 in (2.06 m)	240 lb (110 kg)	Nov 14, 2007
Artem Valov; PF	Recruit ratings: Scout: Rivals: (N/A)				
Anthony Jones; SF	Houston, TX	Yates	6 ft 10 in (2.08 m)	190 lb (86 kg)	Sep 9, 2007
Anthony Jones; SF	Recruit ratings: Scout: Rivals: (95)				
Overall recruit ranking: Scout: NR Rivals: NR ESPN: NR
Note: In many cases, Scout, Rivals, 247Sports, On3, and ESPN may conflict in their listings of height and weight.; In these cases, the average was taken. ESPN grades are on a 100-point scale.; Sources: "Baylor 2008 Basketball Commitments". Rivals.; "2008 Baylor Basketball Commits". Scout.; "ESPN". ESPN.; "Scout.com Team Recruiting Rankings". Scout.; "2008 Team Ranking". Rivals.

== Roster ==
Name	#	Position	Height	Weight	Year	Home Town
Curtis Jerrells	0	Guard	6–1	201	Senior	Austin, TX
Kendall Wright	1	Guard	6–0	180	Freshman	Pittsburg, TX
Duran Diaz	2	Guard/Forward	6–3	201	Sophomore	Kennedale, TX
Fred Ellis	3	Forward	6–6	210	Freshman	Sacramento, CA
Quincy Acy	4	Forward	6–7	215	Freshman	Mesquite, TX
Henry Dugat	5	Guard	6–0	177	Senior	Dayton, TX
Delbert Simpson	11	Forward	6–8	224	Senior	Tyler, TX
Mamadou Diene	15	Center	7–1	246	Senior	Yeumbeul, Senegal
Kevin Rogers	23	Forward	6–9	250	Senior	Dallas, TX
LaceDarius Dunn	24	Guard	6–4	201	Sophomore	Monroe, LA
Anthony Jones	41	Forward	6–10	196	Freshman	Houston, TX
Tweety Carter	45	Guard	5–11	185	Junior	Reserve, LA
Josh Lomers	50	Center	7–0	280	Junior	Boerne, TX
Ekpe Udoh	13	Forward/Center	6–10	236	Junior	Edmond, OK

== Schedule ==
Date time, TV	Rank^{#}	Opponent^{#}	Result	Record	Site (attendance) city, state
Regular Season
November 15, 2008*; 7:30 pm		Paul Quinn College	W 108–50	1–0	Ferrell Center (7,065); Waco, TX
November 18, 2008*; 3:00 pm, ESPN		Centenary	W 90–55	2–0	Ferrell Center (6,422); Waco, TX
November 22, 2008*; 1:00 pm		Southern	W 85–43	3–0	Ferrell Center (6,000); Waco, TX
November 24, 2008*; 7:00 pm		Jacksonville	W 76–68	4–0	Ferrell Center (6,154); Waco, TX
November 27, 2008*; 10:30 pm, ESPN2		vs. Providence; Anaheim Classic	W 72–56	5–0	Anaheim Convention Center (1,157); Anaheim, CA
November 29, 2008*; 11:30 am, ESPN2		vs. No. 14 Arizona State; Anaheim Classic	W 87–78	6–0	Anaheim Convention Center (1,417); Anaheim, CA
November 30, 2008*; 9:30 pm, ESPN2		vs. No. 19 Wake Forest; Anaheim Classic	L 74–87	6–1	Anaheim Convention Center (1,877); Anaheim, CA
December 6, 2008*; 10:30 pm, FSN	No. 24	at Washington State	W 58–52	7–1	Beasley Coliseum (9,038); Pullman, WA
December 13, 2008*; 2:00 pm, FSNSW	No. 22	Prairie View A&M	W 90–63	8–1	Ferrell Center (5,730); Waco, TX
December 20, 2008*; 8:30 pm	No. 21	Texas-Arlington	W 79–76	9–1	Ferrell Center (5,556); Waco, TX
December 22, 2008*; 7:00 pm, FSNSW	No. 21	Hartford	W 74–59	10–1	Ferrell Center (5,219); Waco, TX
December 29, 2008*; 7:00 pm	No. 19	Portland State	W 79–66	11–1	Ferrell Center (5,544); Waco, TX
December 31, 2008*; 4:00 pm, FSNSW	No. 19	Jackson State	W 113–78	12–1	Ferrell Center (5,092); Waco, TX
January 2, 2009*; 4:30 pm, FSNSW	No. 19	South Carolina	L 84–85	12–2	Ferrell Center (6,149); Waco, TX
January 10, 2009; 1:45 pm, Big 12 Network	No. 23	Texas Tech	W 73–61	13–2 (1–0)	Ferrell Center (8,032); Waco, TX
January 14, 2009; 8:30 pm, ESPN2	No. 21	at Texas A&M	L 73–84	13–3 (1–1)	Reed Arena (9,537); College Station, TX
January 17, 2009; 12:45 pm, Big 12 Network	No. 21	Oklahoma State	W 98–92 ^{OT}	14–3 (2–1)	Ferrell Center (8,651); Waco, TX
January 21, 2009; 8:00 pm, ESPN2		at Kansas State	W 83–65	15–3 (3–1)	Bramlage Coliseum (9,386); Manhattan, KS
January 24, 2009; 3:00 pm, ESPNU		at No. 6 Oklahoma	L 76–95	15–4 (3–2)	Lloyd Noble Center (12,849); Norman, OK
January 27, 2009; 8:00 pm, Big 12 Network		No. 11 Texas	L 72–78	15–5 (3–3)	Ferrell Center (9,151); Waco, TX
January 31, 2009; 5:00 pm, Big 12 (ESPN+)		at Missouri	L 72–89	15–6 (3–4)	Mizzou Arena (15,061); Columbia, MO
February 2, 2009; 8:00 pm, ESPN		No. 21 Kansas	L 65–75	15–7 (3–5)	Ferrell Center (9,028); Waco, TX
February 7, 2009; 7:00 pm, ESPNU		at Texas Tech	L 76–83	15–8 (3–6)	United Spirit Arena (10,962); Lubbock, TX
February 11, 2009; 8:00 pm, ESPN2		No. 2 Oklahoma	L 63–78	15–9 (3–7)	Ferrell Center (8,094); Waco, TX
February 14, 2009; 5:00 pm, FSNSW		Texas A&M	W 72–68	16–9 (4–7)	Ferrell Center (10,407); Waco, TX
February 21, 2009; 12:45 pm, Big 12 Network		at Oklahoma State	L 74–84	16–10 (4–8)	Gallagher-Iba Arena (9,637); Stillwater, OK
February 24, 2009; 8:00 pm, Big 12 Network		at Iowa State	L 62–71	16–11 (4–9)	Hilton Coliseum (10,407); Ames, IA
February 28, 2009; 3:00 pm, ESPNU		Colorado	W 75–57	17–11 (5–9)	Ferrell Center (7,192); Waco, TX
March 2, 2009; 8:00 pm, ESPN		at Texas	L 57–73	17–12 (5–10)	Frank Erwin Center (13,665); Austin, TX
March 7, 2009; 3:00 pm, Big 12 Network		Nebraska	L 62–66	17–13 (5–11)	Ferrell Center (6,346); Waco, TX
Big 12 Tournament
March 11, 2009; 11:30 am, Big 12 Network	(9)	vs. (8) Nebraska; First round	W 65–49	18–13	Ford Center (15,413); Oklahoma City, OK
March 12, 2009; 11:30 am, ESPN2	(9)	vs. (1) No. 11 Kansas; Quarterfinals	W 71–64	19–13	Ford Center (14,909); Oklahoma City, OK
March 13, 2009; 5:30 pm, Big 12 Network	(9)	vs. (5) Texas; Semifinals	W 76–70	20–13	Ford Center (16,605); Oklahoma City, OK
March 14, 2009; 6:00 pm, ESPN	(9)	vs. (3) No. 14 Missouri; Championship	L 60–73	20–14	Ford Center (15,321); Oklahoma City, OK
National Invitation Tournament
March 18, 2009*; 8:00 pm, ESPN2	(3)	(6) Georgetown; First round	W 74–72	21–14	Ferrell Center (8,424); Waco, TX
March 21, 2009*; 10:00 am, ESPN	(3)	(2) Virginia Tech; Second round	W 84–66	22–14	Cassell Coliseum (6,891); Blacksburg, VA
March 24, 2009*; 6:00 pm, ESPN	(3)	(1) Auburn; Quarterfinals	W 74–72	23–14	Beard-Eaves-Memorial Coliseum (6,582); Auburn, AL
March 31, 2009*; 6:00 pm, ESPN	(3)	vs. (1) San Diego State; Semifinals	W 76–62	24–14	Madison Square Garden (11,352); New York City, NY
April 2, 2009*; 6:00 pm, ESPN	(3)	vs. (2) Penn State; Championship	L 63–67	24–15	Madison Square Garden (10,254); New York City, NY
*Non-conference game. ^{#}Rankings from AP Poll. (#) Tournament seedings in parentheses. All times are in Central Time.

== Rankings ==
Poll	Pre	Wk 1	Wk 2	Wk 3	Wk 4	Wk 5	Wk 6	Wk 7	Wk 8	Wk 9	Wk 10	Wk 11	Wk 12	Wk 13	Wk 14	Wk 15	Wk 16	Wk 17	Wk 18	Final
AP	NR	NR	NR	24	22	21	21	19	23	21	NR	NR	NR	NR	NR	NR	NR	NR	NR	
Coaches	NR	NR	NR	NR	NR	24	22	20	23	21	23	NR	NR	NR	NR	NR	NR	NR	NR	NR
