= 2008–09 Texas Longhorns men's basketball team =

American college basketball season

2008–09 Texas Longhorns men's basketball

NCAA Tournament, Round of 32
- Conference: Big 12
- South

Ranking
- Coaches: No. 23
- Record: 23–12 (9–7 Big 12)
- Head coach: Rick Barnes
- Home arena: Frank Erwin Center

2008–09 Big 12 men's basketball standings
	Conf.				Overall
Team	W		L	PCT	W		L	PCT
No. 14 Kansas	14	–	2	.875	27	–	8	.771
No. 7 Oklahoma	13	–	3	.813	30	–	6	.833
No. 9 Missouri †	12	–	4	.750	31	–	7	.816
Kansas State	9	–	7	.563	22	–	12	.647
Texas	9	–	7	.563	23	–	12	.657
Texas A&M	9	–	7	.563	24	–	10	.706
Oklahoma State	9	–	7	.563	23	–	12	.657
Nebraska	8	–	8	.500	18	–	13	.581
Baylor	5	–	11	.313	24	–	15	.615
Iowa State	4	–	12	.250	15	–	17	.469
Texas Tech	3	–	13	.188	14	–	19	.424
Colorado	1	–	15	.063	9	–	22	.290
† 2009 Big 12 Tournament winner Rankings from AP poll

The 2008–09 Texas Longhorns men's basketball team represented the University of Texas at Austin in NCAA Division I intercollegiate men's basketball competition as a member of the Big 12 Conference. The 2008–09 team posted a 23–12 record, finished in fourth place in the Big 12, and reached the second round of the 2009 NCAA tournament.

== Roster ==
	#	Position	Height	Weight	Year	Home Town
Gary Johnson	1	Forward	6–6	233	Sophomore	Houston, Texas
A.J. Abrams	3	Guard	5–11	165	Senior	Round Rock, Texas
Doğuş Balbay	4	Guard	6–0	165	Sophomore	Istanbul, Turkey
Damion James	5	Guard/forward	6–7	222	Junior	Nacogdoches, Texas
Alexis Wangmene	20	Forward/center	6–7	241	Junior	Maroua, Cameroon
Matt Hill	21	Center	6–10	241	Sophomore	Lincoln, Nebraska
Harrison Smith	23	Guard	6–2	195	Junior	Houston, Texas
Justin Mason	24	Guard	6–2	194	Junior	Amarillo, Texas
Connor Atchley	32	Center	6–10	228	Senior	Clear Lake (Houston), Texas
Dexter Pittman	34	Center	6–10	298	Junior	Rosenberg, Texas
Varez Ward	50	Guard	6–2	190	Freshman	Montgomery, Alabama
Clint Chapman	45	Forward/center	6–10	235	Sophomore	Canby, Oregon

== Recruiting ==
College recruiting
Name	Hometown	School	Height	Weight	Commit date
Varez Ward; SF	Patterson, NC	The Patterson School	6 ft 3 in (1.91 m)	195 lb (88 kg)	Jun 1, 2008
Varez Ward; SF	Recruit ratings: Scout: Rivals: (71)				
J'Covan Brown; SG	Port Arthur, TX	Memorial HS	6 ft 2 in (1.88 m)	175 lb (79 kg)	Nov 15, 2007
J'Covan Brown; SG	Recruit ratings: Scout: Rivals: (87)				
Overall recruit ranking: Scout: NR Rivals: NR ESPN: NR
Note: In many cases, Scout, Rivals, 247Sports, On3, and ESPN may conflict in their listings of height and weight.; In these cases, the average was taken. ESPN grades are on a 100-point scale.; Sources: "Texas 2008 Basketball Commitments". Rivals.; "2008 Texas Basketball Commits". Scout.; "ESPN". ESPN.; "Scout.com Team Recruiting Rankings". Scout.; "2008 Team Ranking". Rivals.

== Schedule ==
Date time, TV	Rank^{#}	Opponent^{#}	Result	Record	Site city, state
Regular season
2008/11/14*; 7:00 p.m.	No. 7	Stetson	W 68–38	1–0	Frank Erwin Center; Austin, TX
2008/11/18*; 7:00 p.m.	No. 7	Tulane	W 76–51	2–0	Frank Erwin Center; Austin, TX
2008/11/24*; 2:00 p.m., ESPN2	No. 6	vs. Saint Joseph's; Maui Invitational	W 68–50	3–0	Lahaina Civic Center; Lahaina, HI
2008/11/25*; 6:00 p.m., ESPN	No. 6	vs. No. 8 Notre Dame; Maui Invitational	L 80–81	3–1	Lahaina Civic Center; Lahaina, HI
2008/11/26*; 4:30 p.m., ESPN	No. 6	vs. Oregon; Maui Invitational	W 70–57	4–1	Lahaina Civic Center; Lahaina, HI
2008/11/30*; 2:00 p.m.	No. 6	Rice	W 77–56	5–1	Frank Erwin Center; Austin, TX
2008/12/04*; 8:00 p.m., ESPN2	No. 8	No. 12 UCLA	W 68–64	6–1	Frank Erwin Center; Austin, TX
2008/12/09*; 8:00 p.m., ESPN	No. 6	No. 15 Villanova; Jimmy V Classic	W 67–58	7–1	Frank Erwin Center; Austin TX
2008/12/13*; 12:00 p.m.	No. 6	Texas State	W 81–73	8–1	Frank Erwin Center; Austin, TX
2008/12/16*; 7:00 p.m.	No. 5	Texas Southern	W 88–72	9–1	Frank Erwin Center; Austin, TX
2008/12/20*; 1:00 p.m., CBS	No. 5	No. 19 Michigan State	L 63–67	9–2	Toyota Center; Houston, TX
2008/12/23*; 8:30 p.m., ESPN2	No. 9	at Wisconsin	W 74–69	10–2	Kohl Center; Madison, WI
2009/01/02*; 8:00 p.m., ESPNU	No. 8	Appalachian State	W 78–43	11–2	Frank Erwin Center; Austin, TX
2009/01/06*; 8:05 p.m., ESPN2	No. 7	at Arkansas	L 61–67	11–3	Bud Walton Arena; Fayetteville, AR
2009/01/10; 4:00 p.m., Big 12 (ESPN+)	No. 7	Iowa State	W 75–67	12–3 (1–0)	Frank Erwin Center; Austin, TX
2009/01/12; 8:00 p.m., ESPN	No. 11	at No. 6 Oklahoma	L 63–78	12–4 (1–1)	Lloyd Noble Center; Norman, OK
2009/01/17; 3:00 p.m., Big 12 (ESPN+)	No. 11	at Texas Tech	W 71–49	13–4 (2–1)	United Spirit Arena; Lubbock, TX
2009/01/24; 7:00 p.m., ESPNU	No. 14	Texas A&M	W 67–58	14–4 (3–1)	Frank Erwin Center; Austin, TX
2009/01/27; 8:00 p.m., Big 12 (ESPN+)	No. 11	at Baylor	W 78–72	15–4 (4–1)	Ferrell Center; Waco, TX
2009/01/31; 3:00 p.m., Big 12 (ESPN+)	No. 11	Kansas State	L 81–85 ^{OT}	15–5 (4–2)	Frank Erwin Center; Austin, TX
2009/02/04; 8:30 p.m., ESPN2	No. 16	Missouri	L 65–69	15–6 (4–3)	Frank Erwin Center; Austin, TX
2009/02/07; 1:00 p.m., ESPN	No. 16	at Nebraska	L 55–58	15–7 (4–4)	Bob Devaney Sports Center; Lincoln, NE
2009/02/10; 7:00 p.m.		Oklahoma State	W 99–74	16–7 (5–4)	Frank Erwin Center; Austin, TX
2009/02/14; 1:00 p.m., ESPN		at Colorado	W 85–76 (OT)	17–7 (6–4)	Coors Events Center; Boulder, CO
2009/02/16; 8:00 p.m., ESPN		at Texas A&M	L 66–81	17–8 (6–5)	Reed Arena; College Station, TX
2009/02/21; 8:00 p.m., ESPN		No. 2 Oklahoma; ESPN College GameDay	W 73–68	18–8 (7–5)	Frank Erwin Center; Austin, TX
2009/02/25; 8:30 p.m., ESPN2	No. 25	Texas Tech	W 87–81	19–8 (8–5)	Frank Erwin Center; Austin, TX
2009/02/28; 6:00 p.m., ESPN	No. 25	at Oklahoma State	L 59-68	19–9 (8–6)	Gallagher-Iba Arena; Stillwater, OK
2009/03/02; 8:00 p.m., ESPN		Baylor	W 73–57	20–9 (9–6)	Frank Erwin Center; Austin, TX
2009/03/07; 3:00 p.m., CBS		at No. 9 Kansas	L 73-83	20–10 (9–7)	Allen Fieldhouse; Lawrence, KS
Big 12 Tournament
2009/03/11; 2:00 p.m., Big 12 Network		vs. Colorado	W 77–56	21–10	Ford Center; Oklahoma City, Oklahoma
2009/03/12; 2:00 p.m., Big 12 Network		vs. Kansas State	W 61–58	22–10	Ford Center; Oklahoma City, Oklahoma
2009/03/13; 6:00 p.m., Big 12 Network		vs. Baylor	L 70–76	22–11	Ford Center; Oklahoma City, Oklahoma
NCAA tournament
2009/03/19; CBS		vs. Minnesota; First Round	W 76–62	23–11	Greensboro Coliseum; Greensboro, NC
2009/03/21; 7:15PM, CBS		vs. No. 6 Duke; Second Round	L 69–74	23–12	Greensboro Coliseum; Greensboro, NC
*Non-conference game. ^{#}Rankings from AP Poll. (#) Tournament seedings in parentheses. All times are in Central Standard Time.

== Rankings ==
Poll	Pre	Wk 1	Wk 2	Wk 3	Wk 4	Wk 5	Wk 6	Wk 7	Wk 8	Wk 9	Wk 10	Wk 11	Wk 12	Wk 13	Wk 14	Wk 15	Wk 16	Wk 17	Wk 18	Wk 19	Final
AP	7	7	6	8	6	5	9	8	7	11	14	11	16	NR	NR	25	NR				
Coaches	8	8	7	8	6	5	8	7	7	11	15	12	17	NR	NR	24	NR				

== Awards and honors ==
- Rick Barnes, Legends of Coaching Award (adopted by the John R.Wooden Award Committee)
