= 2008–09 Kansas State Wildcats men's basketball team =

American college basketball season

2008–09 Kansas State Wildcats men's basketball

NIT, Second Round
- Conference: Big 12 Conference
- Record: 22–12 (9–7 Big 12)
- Head coach: Frank Martin
- Assistant coaches: Matt Figger; Dalonte Hill; Brad Underwood
- Home arena: Bramlage Coliseum (12,500)

2008–09 Big 12 men's basketball standings
	Conf.				Overall
Team	W		L	PCT	W		L	PCT
No. 14 Kansas	14	–	2	.875	27	–	8	.771
No. 7 Oklahoma	13	–	3	.813	30	–	6	.833
No. 9 Missouri †	12	–	4	.750	31	–	7	.816
Kansas State	9	–	7	.563	22	–	12	.647
Texas	9	–	7	.563	23	–	12	.657
Texas A&M	9	–	7	.563	24	–	10	.706
Oklahoma State	9	–	7	.563	23	–	12	.657
Nebraska	8	–	8	.500	18	–	13	.581
Baylor	5	–	11	.313	24	–	15	.615
Iowa State	4	–	12	.250	15	–	17	.469
Texas Tech	3	–	13	.188	14	–	19	.424
Colorado	1	–	15	.063	9	–	22	.290
† 2009 Big 12 Tournament winner Rankings from AP poll

The 2008–09 Kansas State Wildcats men's basketball team represented Kansas State University in the 2008–09 college basketball season. The Wildcats, led by second-year head coach Frank Martin, played their home games at Bramlage Coliseum.

== Pre-season ==
The 2007–08 season was a successful one for the Wildcats. They returned to the NCAA tournament for the first time since 1996. 2007–08 was also the first season for head coach Frank Martin. Michael Beasley and Bill Walker led the team in scoring and nearly every other offensive category. They were also both drafted, marking the first time since 1990 that a Wildcat was drafted (Steve Henson was the last). It was also the first time since 1982 that more than one Wildcat was drafted (Tyrone Adams, Randy Reed and Ed Nealy.

== Regular season ==
Kansas State became just the second school in Big 12 history (after Iowa State in 2004–05) to rally from an 0–4 start to get back to at least .500 in conference play. The previous best finish after such a start came in 1983–84 when K-State finished Big Eight play with a 5–9 mark.

The Wildcats finished the conference season in a tie for fourth place with a 9–7 record in the Big 12 and a 21–10 record overall. They earned the number four seed in the 2009 Big 12 men's basketball tournament. 2008–09 marks the third consecutive year that the team earned one of the top 4 spots in the tournament, and thus received a first round bye.

== Incoming signees ==
College recruiting information
Name	Hometown	School	Height	Weight	Commit date
Buchi Awaji; SG	Glendora, California	Los Angeles-Loyola H.S.	6 ft 3 in (1.91 m)	185 lb (84 kg)	Apr 25, 2008
Buchi Awaji; SG	Recruit ratings: Scout: Rivals: (N/A)				
Abdul Herrera; C	Washington, D.C.	Miami-Hutchinson C.C.	6 ft 10 in (2.08 m)	265 lb (120 kg)	Apr 23, 2008
Abdul Herrera; C	Recruit ratings: Scout: Rivals: (N/A)				
Overall recruit ranking:
Note: In many cases, Scout, Rivals, 247Sports, On3, and ESPN may conflict in their listings of height and weight.; In these cases, the average was taken. ESPN grades are on a 100-point scale.; Sources: "Kansas State 2008 Basketball Commitments". Rivals.; "2008 Kansas State Commits". Scout.; "Scout.com Team Recruiting Rankings". Scout.; "2008 Team Ranking". Rivals.

== Schedule ==
Date time, TV	Rank^{#}	Opponent^{#}	Result	Record	Site (attendance) city, state
Exhibition
11/09/2008*; 2:00 pm		Washburn	W 81–57	–	Bramlage Coliseum (7,733); Manhattan, KS
Regular season
11/14/2008*; 7:00 pm, FSKC		Florida A&M	W 96–57	1–0	Bramlage Coliseum (9,070); Manhattan, KS
11/16/2008*; 2:00 pm		SE Missouri State	W 88–68	2–0	Bramlage Coliseum (8,109); Manhattan, KS
11/19/2008*; 7:00 pm, FSKC		Emporia State	W 82–60	3–0	Bramlage Coliseum (8,083); Manhattan, KS
11/22/2008*; 6:00 pm		at Cleveland State	W 69–59	4–0	Wolstein Center (2,827); Cleveland, OH
11/25/2008*; 7:00 pm, FSKC		Oakland	W 83–64	5–0	Bramlage Coliseum (8,356); Manhattan, KS
11/28/2008*; 11:00 pm, ESPNU		vs. Kentucky; Findlay Toyota Las Vegas Invitational	L 72–74	5–1	Orleans Arena (5,000); Paradise, Nevada
11/29/2008*; 6:30 pm, ESPN2		vs. Iowa; Findlay Toyota Las Vegas Invitational	L 63–65	5–2	Orleans Arena (2,000); Paradise, NV
12/07/2008*; 7:30 pm, FSN		at Oregon; Big 12/Pac-10 Hardwood Series	L 70–75	5–3	McArthur Court (8,256); Eugene, OR
12/11/2008*; 7:00 pm, FSKC		vs. Southern Miss	W 74–55	6–3	Sprint Center (6,054); Kansas City, MO
12/14/2008*; 6:00 pm		Gardner–Webb	W 107–48	7–3	Bramlage Coliseum (8,112); Manhattan, KS
12/20/2008*; 1:00 pm		Centenary	W 73–51	8–3	Bramlage Coliseum (8,861); Manhattan, KS
12/30/2008*; 7:00 pm, FSKC		Wagner	W 82–53	9–3	Bramlage Coliseum (7,304); Manhattan, KS
01/03/2009*; 1:00 pm, FSKC		Idaho State	W 83–57	10–3	Bramlage Coliseum (7,446); Manhattan, KS
01/05/2009*; 7:00 pm, FSKC		Chicago State	W 99–68	11–3	Bramlage Coliseum (5,381); Manhattan, KS
01/10/2009; 12:30 pm, B12N		No. 6 Oklahoma	L 53–61	11–4 (0–1)	Bramlage Coliseum (12,528); Manhattan, KS
01/13/2009; 7:00 pm, B12N		at Kansas; Sunflower Showdown	L 71–87	11–5 (0–2)	Allen Fieldhouse (16,300); Lawrence, KS
01/17/2009; 5:00 pm, B12N		at Nebraska	L 51–73	11–6 (0–3)	Devaney Sports Center (11,736); Lincoln, NE
01/21/2009; 8:00 pm, ESPN2		Baylor	L 65–84	11–7 (0–4)	Bramlage Coliseum (9,386); Manhattan, KS
01/24/2009; 5:00 pm, B12N		at Colorado	W 77–75 ^{OT}	12–7 (1–4)	Coors Events Center (6,061); Boulder, CO
01/28/2009; 8:00 pm, FSKC		Missouri	W 88–72	13–7 (2–4)	Bramlage Coliseum (9,665); Manhattan, KS
01/31/2009; 3:00 pm, B12N		at No. 11 Texas	W 85–81 ^{OT}	14–7 (3–4)	Frank Erwin Center (13,186); Austin, TX
02/03/2009; 7:10 pm, FSKC		Iowa State	W 65–50	15–7 (4–4)	Bramlage Coliseum (9,489); Manhattan, KS
02/07/2009; 3:00 pm, B12N		at Texas A&M	W 65–60	16–7 (5–4)	Reed Arena (10,367); College Station, TX
02/11/2009; 8:00 pm, ESPNU		Texas Tech	W 85–73	17–7 (6–4)	Bramlage Coliseum (9,941); Manhattan, KS
02/14/2009; 2:30 pm, ABC		No. 16 Kansas; Sunflower Showdown	L 74–85	17–8 (6–5)	Bramlage Coliseum (12,528); Manhattan, KS
02/17/2009*; 7:00 pm		North Carolina Central	W 95–49	18–8 (6–5)	Bramlage Coliseum (7,681); Manhattan, KS
02/21/2009; 5:00 pm, FSKC		at Iowa State	W 50–46	19–8 (7–5)	Hilton Coliseum (11,922); Ames, IA
02/25/2009; 8:00 pm, ESPNU		at No. 11 Missouri	L 74–94	19–9 (7–6)	Mizzou Arena (14,825); Columbia, MO
02/28/2009; 7:00 pm, B12N		Nebraska	W 77–72	20–9 (8–6)	Bramlage Coliseum (12,528); Manhattan, KS
03/03/2009; 6:30 pm, ESPN2		at Oklahoma State	L 71–77	20–10 (8–7)	Gallagher-Iba Arena (12,106); Stillwater, OK
03/07/2009; 12:30 pm, B12N		Colorado	W 76–64	21–10 (9–7)	Bramlage Coliseum (10,152); Manhattan, KS
Phillips 66 Big 12 tournament
03/12/2009; 2:00 pm, B12N		vs. Texas; Quarterfinals	L 58–61	21–11	Ford Center (14,909); Oklahoma City, OK
2009 NIT tournament
03/18/2009*; 7:00 pm		Illinois State; First Round	W 83–79 ^{OT}	22–11	Bramlage Coliseum (8,130); Manhattan, KS
03/20/2009*; 8:30 pm		at San Diego State; Second Round	L 52–70	22–12	Cox Arena (5,100); San Diego, CA
*Non-conference game. ^{#}Rankings from AP Poll. (#) Tournament seedings in parentheses. All times are in Central Time.

== Roster ==
#	Name	Height	Weight (lbs.)	Position	Class	Hometown	Previous Team(s)
0	Jacob Pullen	6'0"	200	G	So.	Maywood, IL, U.S.	Proviso East HS
1	Fred Brown	6'2"	190	G	So.	West Palm Beach, FL, U.S.	Dwyer HS
13	Justin Werner	6'3"	190	G	Fr.	Topeka, KS, U.S.	Washburn Rural HS
15	Luis Colon	6'10"	265	C	Jr.	Bayamón, Puerto Rico	Krop HS (Miami, FL)
21	Denis Clemente	6'1"	175	G	Jr.	Bayamón, Puerto Rico	Calusa Prep HS (Miami, FL); University of Miami
23	Dominique Sutton	6'5"	210	G	So.	Durham, NC, U.S.	Patterson HS (Lenoir, NC)
24	Curtis Kelly	6'8"	250	F	Jr.	New York, NY, U.S.	Rice HS; University of Connecticut
25	Buchi Awaji	6'3"	185	G	Jr.	Los Angeles, CA, U.S.	Loyola HS; Florida International University; Citrus College
31	Chris Merriewether	6'3"	210	G	Jr.	Jacksonville, FL, U.S.	Arlington Country Day HS
32	Jamar Samuels	6'7"	215	F	Fr.	Washington, DC, U.S.	Patterson HS (Lenoir, NC)
33	Victor Ojeleye	6'6"	225	F	Fr.	Ottawa, KS, U.S.	Patterson HS (Lenoir, NC)
40	Ron Anderson	6'8"	255	F	So.	Upper Marlboro, MD, U.S.	McCallie HS (Chattanooga, TN)
42	Darren Kent	6'11"	230	F	Sr.	Apple Valley, MN, U.S.	Eastview HS

== See also ==
- 2008–09 Big 12 Conference men's basketball season
