= 2008–09 Iowa State Cyclones men's basketball team =

American college basketball season

2008–09 Iowa State Cyclones men's basketball
- Conference: Big 12 Conference
- Record: 15-17 (4-12 Big 12)
- Head coach: Greg McDermott (3rd season)
- Assistant coaches: T. J. Otzelberger (3rd season); Jeff Rutter; Daniyal Robinson
- Home arena: Hilton Coliseum

2008–09 Big 12 men's basketball standings
	Conf.				Overall
Team	W		L	PCT	W		L	PCT
No. 14 Kansas	14	–	2	.875	27	–	8	.771
No. 7 Oklahoma	13	–	3	.813	30	–	6	.833
No. 9 Missouri †	12	–	4	.750	31	–	7	.816
Kansas State	9	–	7	.563	22	–	12	.647
Texas	9	–	7	.563	23	–	12	.657
Texas A&M	9	–	7	.563	24	–	10	.706
Oklahoma State	9	–	7	.563	23	–	12	.657
Nebraska	8	–	8	.500	18	–	13	.581
Baylor	5	–	11	.313	24	–	15	.615
Iowa State	4	–	12	.250	15	–	17	.469
Texas Tech	3	–	13	.188	14	–	19	.424
Colorado	1	–	15	.063	9	–	22	.290
† 2009 Big 12 Tournament winner Rankings from AP poll

The 2008–09 Iowa State Cyclones men's basketball team represented Iowa State University during the 2008–09 NCAA Division I men's basketball season. The Cyclones were coached by Greg McDermott, who was in his third season. They played their home games at Hilton Coliseum in Ames, Iowa and competed in the Big 12 Conference.

== Previous season ==
The Cyclones finished 14–18, 4–12 in Big 12 play to finish 11th in the regular season conference standings. They lost to Texas A&M in the first round of the Big 12 tournament.

=== Offseason departures ===
Offseason departures
Name	Position	Reason
Wes Johnson	Forward	Transferred to Syracuse
Cory Johnson	Forward	Transferred to Valparaiso
Mark Currie	Guard	Graduated
Mike Smith	Forward	Graduated
Rahshon Clark	Forward	Graduated
Jiri Hubaleck	Center	Graduated
Brock Jacobson	Guard	Left team

== Recruiting ==
College recruiting
Name	Hometown	School	Height	Weight	Commit date
Dominique Buckley; PG	Detroit	Romulus High	6 ft 2 in (1.88 m)	185 lb (84 kg)	Oct 25, 2006
Dominique Buckley; PG	Recruit ratings: Scout: Rivals: 247Sports: (89)				
Scott Christopherson; PG	La Crosse, Wisconsin	Marquette	6 ft 2 in (1.88 m)	180 lb (82 kg)	
Scott Christopherson; PG	Recruit ratings: Rivals: 247Sports: (91)				
Wes Eikmeier; PG	Fremont, Nebraska	Archbishop Bergan	6 ft 3 in (1.91 m)	165 lb (75 kg)	Sep 5, 2006
Wes Eikmeier; PG	Recruit ratings: Scout: Rivals: 247Sports: (NR)				
L.A. Pomlee; PF	Davenport, Iowa	Davenport Central	6 ft 8 in (2.03 m)	220 lb (100 kg)	Apr 16, 2008
L.A. Pomlee; PF	Recruit ratings: Scout: Rivals: 247Sports: (87)				
Clinton Mann; PF	Overland Park, Kansas	St. Thomas Aquinas	6 ft 7 in (2.01 m)	220 lb (100 kg)	Sep 29, 2007
Clinton Mann; PF	Recruit ratings: Scout: Rivals: 247Sports: (NR)				
Jamie Vanderbeken; PF	Belleville, ON	Tyler JC	6 ft 9 in (2.06 m)	250 lb (110 kg)	Apr 16, 2008
Jamie Vanderbeken; PF	Recruit ratings: Rivals: 247Sports:				
Justin Hamilton; C	Alpine, Utah	Lone Peak	6 ft 11 in (2.11 m)	220 lb (100 kg)	Sep 18, 2007
Justin Hamilton; C	Recruit ratings: Scout: Rivals: 247Sports: (90)				
Overall recruit ranking: 247Sports: 55
Note: In many cases, Scout, Rivals, 247Sports, On3, and ESPN may conflict in their listings of height and weight.; In these cases, the average was taken. ESPN grades are on a 100-point scale.; Sources: "Iowa State 2008 Basketball Commitments". Rivals.; "2008 Iowa State Basketball Commits". Scout.; "ESPN". ESPN.; "Scout.com Team Recruiting Rankings". Scout.; "2008 Team Ranking". Rivals.

== Roster ==
2009–10 Iowa State Cyclones men's basketball team
Players
Coaches

Pos.	#	Name	Height	Weight	Year	Previous school	Hometown
G	0	Charles Boozer	6 ft 3 in (1.91 m)	195 lb (88 kg)	So	Stoneridge Prep	Raleigh, North Carolina
G	1	Dominique Buckley	6 ft 2 in (1.88 m)	205 lb (93 kg)	Fr	Romulus High	Detroit
G	2	Scott Christopherson	6 ft 3 in (1.91 m)	205 lb (93 kg)	So	Marquette	La Crosse, Wisconsin
G	3	Sean Haluska	6 ft 3 in (1.91 m)	200 lb (91 kg)	Sr	Indian Hills	Carroll, Iowa
G	5	Lucca Staiger	6 ft 5 in (1.96 m)	220 lb (100 kg)	So	Decatur Christian	Blaustein, GER
G	10	Diante Garrett	6 ft 4 in (1.93 m)	180 lb (82 kg)	So	Vincent High	Milwaukee
G	6	Wes Eikmeier	6 ft 3 in (1.91 m)	170 lb (77 kg)	Fr	Archbishop Bergan	Fremont, Nebraska
F	15	Alex Thompson	6 ft 10 in (2.08 m)	230 lb (104 kg)	RS Sr	Iowa	Ames, Iowa
F	21	Craig Brackins	6 ft 10 in (2.08 m)	230 lb (104 kg)	So	Brewster Academy	Palmdale, California
G	22	Brian Peterson	6 ft 1 in (1.85 m)	180 lb (82 kg)	Sr	Kirkwood CC	Clinton, Iowa
F	23	Jamie Vanderbeken	6 ft 11 in (2.11 m)	245 lb (111 kg)	Jr	Tyler JC	Belleville, ON
G	24	Cameron Lee	6 ft 2 in (1.88 m)	180 lb (82 kg)	RS So	Hillcrest	Country Club Hills, Illinois
F	33	Clinton Mann	6 ft 7 in (2.01 m)	230 lb (104 kg)	Fr	St. Thomas Aquinas	Overland Park, Kansas
F	34	L.A. Pomlee	6 ft 8 in (2.03 m)	235 lb (107 kg)	Fr	Davenport Central	Davenport, Iowa
C	41	Justin Hamilton	6 ft 11 in (2.11 m)	255 lb (116 kg)	Fr	Lone Peak	Alpine, Utah

Head coach

- Greg McDermott (Northern Iowa)

Assistant coach(es)

- T. J. Otzelberger (UW–Whitewater)
- Jeff Rutter (Winona State)
- Daniyal Robinson (Little Rock)

Legend

- (C) Team captain
- (S) Suspended
- (I) Ineligible
- (W) Walk-on
- Injured
- Current redshirt

== Schedule and results ==
Date time, TV	Rank^{#}	Opponent^{#}	Result	Record	Site city, state
Exhibition
November 8, 2008*; 3:30 pm		Nebraska-Omaha; Exhibition	W 74-54		Hilton Coliseum; Ames, Iowa
Regular season
November 14, 2008*; 7:00 pm, CloneZone		UC Davis; World Vision Classic	W 61-58	1-0	Hilton Coliseum; Ames, Iowa
November 15, 2008*; 12:30 pm, CloneZone		Loyola Marymount; World Vision Classic	W 67-55	2-0	Hilton Coliseum; Ames, Iowa
November 16, 2008*; 7:00 pm, CloneZone		Milwaukee; World Vision Classic	W 79-61	3-0	Hilton Coliseum; Ames, Iowa
November 24, 2008*; 11:00 pm CT, KFVE		at Hawaii	L 59-60	3-1	Stan Sheriff Center; Honolulu, HI
November 29, 2008*; 12:30 pm, Mediacom		Mississippi Valley State	W 77-59	4-1	Hilton Coliseum; Ames, Iowa
December 3, 2008*; 8:00 pm, UNITV		at UNI	W 71-66 ^{OT}	5-1	McLeod Center; Cedar Falls, Iowa
December 6, 2008*; 1:00 pm, ESPNU		Oregon State	W 63-50	6-1	Hilton Coliseum; Ames, Iowa
December 9, 2008*; 8:00 pm, ESPNU		Drake	L 63-66	6-2	Hilton Coliseum; Ames, Iowa
December 12, 2008*; 7:00 pm, BTN		at Iowa; Hy-Vee Cy-Hawk	L 57-73	6-3	Carver–Hawkeye Arena; Iowa City, Iowa
December 20, 2008*; 8:00 pm, Mediacom		Jacksonville State	W 66-60	7-3	Hilton Coliseum; Ames, Iowa
December 23, 2008*; 7:00 pm, Mediacom		South Dakota State	L 58-65	7-4	Hilton Coliseum; Ames, Iowa
December 28, 2008*; 5:00 pm		at Houston	W 71-67	8-4	Hofheinz Pavilion; Houston
December 31, 2008*; 4:00 pm, CloneZone		Mercer	W 67-49	9-4	Hilton Coliseum; Ames, Iowa
January 3, 2009*; 7:00 pm, Mediacom		SIU Edwardsville	W 91-55	10-4	Hilton Coliseum; Ames, Iowa
January 6, 2009*; 7:00 pm, CloneZone		Houston Baptist	W 64-56	11-4	Hilton Coliseum; Ames, Iowa
January 10, 2009; 3:00 pm, Big 12 Network		at No. 7 Texas	L 67-75	11-5 (0-1)	Frank Erwin Center; Austin, Texas
January 14, 2009; 7:00 pm, Cyclone Television Network		Nebraska	W 65-53	12-5 (1-1)	Hilton Coliseum; Ames, Iowa
January 17, 2009; 12:45 pm, Big 12 Network		at Missouri	L 46-77	12-6 (1-2)	Hearnes Center; Columbia, Missouri
January 11, 2009; 1:00 pm, ESPN		Kansas	L 67-82	12-7 (1-3)	Hilton Coliseum; Ames, Iowa
January 27, 2009; 9:30 pm CT, FSNRM		at Colorado	L 49-55	12-8 (1-4)	Coors Events Center; Boulder, Colorado
January 31, 2009; 12:45 pm, Big 12 Network		No. 4 Oklahoma	L 68-78	12-9 (1-5)	Hilton Coliseum; Ames, Iowa
February 3, 2009; 7:00 pm, Cyclone Television Network		at Kansas State	L 50-65	12-10 (1-6)	Bramlage Coliseum; Manhattan, Kansas
February 7, 2009; 5:00 pm, Cyclone Television Network		Missouri	L 68-82	12-11 (1-7)	Hilton Coliseum; Ames, Iowa
February 11, 2009; 6:30 pm, Cyclone Television Network		Colorado	W 70-42	13-11 (2-7)	Hilton Coliseum; Ames, Iowa
February 14, 2009; 3:00 pm, Big 12 Network		at Oklahoma State	L 67-86	13-12 (2-8)	Gallagher-Iba Arena; Stillwater, Oklahoma
February 14, 2009; 7:00 pm, Big 12 Network		at No. 15 Kansas	L 55-72	13-13 (2-9)	Allen Fieldhouse; Lawrence, Kansas
February 21, 2006; 5:00 pm, Cyclone Television Network		Kansas State	L 46-50	13-14 (2-10)	Hilton Coliseum; Ames, Iowa
February 24, 2009; 8:00 pm, Big 12 Network		Baylor	W 71-62	14-14 (3-10)	Hilton Coliseum; Ames, Iowa
February 28, 2009; 12:45 pm, Big 12 Network		at Texas A&M	L 69-87	14-15 (3-11)	Reed Arena; College Station
March 4, 2009; 6:30 pm, Cyclone Television Network		at Nebraska	L 61-77	14-16 (3-12)	Bob Devaney Sports Center; Lincoln, Nebraska
March 7, 2009; 12:45 pm, Big 12 Network		Texas Tech	W 78-76	15-16 (4-12)	Hilton Coliseum; Ames, Iowa
Big 12 Tournament
March 11, 2009; 6:00 pm, Big 12 Network		vs. Oklahoma State	L 67-82	15-17 (4-12)	Ford Center; Oklahoma City
*Non-conference game. ^{#}Rankings from AP poll. (#) Tournament seedings in parentheses. All times are in Central Time.

== Awards and honors ==
- All-American

Craig Brackins (2009)

- All-Conference Selections

Craig Brackins (1st Team)

- Academic All-Big 12 First Team

Sean Haluska (2009)

- Ralph A. Olsen Award

Craig Brackins (2009)
