= 2008–09 Missouri Tigers men's basketball team =

American college basketball season

2008–09 Missouri Tigers men's basketball

Big 12 Tournament Champions

NCAA tournament, Elite Eight
- Conference: Big 12
- North

Ranking
- Coaches: No. 8
- AP: No. 9
- Record: 31–7 (12–4 Big 12)
- Head coach: Mike Anderson
- Assistant coaches: Melvin Watkins; Matt Zimmerman; T.J. Cleveland
- Home arena: Mizzou Arena

2008–09 Big 12 men's basketball standings
	Conf.				Overall
Team	W		L	PCT	W		L	PCT
No. 14 Kansas	14	–	2	.875	27	–	8	.771
No. 7 Oklahoma	13	–	3	.813	30	–	6	.833
No. 9 Missouri †	12	–	4	.750	31	–	7	.816
Kansas State	9	–	7	.563	22	–	12	.647
Texas	9	–	7	.563	23	–	12	.657
Texas A&M	9	–	7	.563	24	–	10	.706
Oklahoma State	9	–	7	.563	23	–	12	.657
Nebraska	8	–	8	.500	18	–	13	.581
Baylor	5	–	11	.313	24	–	15	.615
Iowa State	4	–	12	.250	15	–	17	.469
Texas Tech	3	–	13	.188	14	–	19	.424
Colorado	1	–	15	.063	9	–	22	.290
† 2009 Big 12 Tournament winner Rankings from AP poll

The 2008–09 Missouri Tigers men's basketball team finished 31–7 and reached the Elite Eight of the NCAA tournament. Led by head coach Mike Anderson, Mizzou finished third in the Big 12 with a conference record of 12–4 and also won the Big 12 men's basketball tournament for the first time in school history.

== Pre-season ==
Following a .500 season in 2007–08 season, the Tigers revamped their offense with five freshmen and two transfers. The Tigers basketball team was not heralded with much in the way of high hopes coming into the 2008–09 season. Most preseason polls had Missouri finishing in the bottom-half of the Big 12 Conference, including Athlon Sports and the Big 12 coaches.

As a way to get in some much needed extra practice, coach Mike Anderson accepted an invitation to play three exhibition games in Canada in late August. In the first game of the tour, Missouri defeated the Niagara All-Stars by a score of 120–80 on August 30, 2008. The game was played at Brock University in St. Catharines, Ontario. On August 31, 2008, in the same venue, the Tigers defeated Brock University 117–68. This game gave the Missouri coaching staff and fans a nice look at the fresh faces, as Mizzou's seven newcomers combined for 66 of the Tigers' 117 points on the afternoon. The next morning, the Tigers closed out the Canadian trip by beating the Southern Ontario All-Stars by a final score of 109–92.

The Tigers played two pre-season games in 2008. The first was against Lincoln (MO), winning the game 97–54. The second of their two pre-season games was against Missouri Southern, resulting in an 87–58 Tigers victory.

== Schedule ==
Date time, TV	Rank^{#}	Opponent^{#}	Result	Record	Site (attendance) city, state
Summer Canadian Exhibition
2008/8/30*; 4:30 pm		Ontario All-Stars	W 120–80		Bob Davis Gymnasium; St. Catharines, Ontario
2008/8/31*; 1:00 pm		Brock University	W 117–68		Bob Davis Gymnasium; St. Catharines, Ontario
2008/9/1*; 9:00 am		Southern Ontario All-Stars	W 109–92		Notre Dame College School; Welland, Ontario
Exhibition
2008/11/6*; 7:00 pm		Lincoln (MO)	W 97–54		Mizzou Arena; Columbia, MO
2008/11/11*; 7:00 pm		Missouri Southern	W 87–58		Mizzou Arena; Columbia, MO
Non-conference regular season
2008/11/15*; 3:30 pm		Prairie View A&M	W 86–65	1–0	Mizzou Arena (5,463); Columbia, MO
2008/11/17*; 7:00 pm		Chattanooga	W 103–75	2–0	Mizzou Arena (5,275); Columbia, MO
2008/11/20*; 12:00 pm, ESPNU		vs. Xavier	L 71–75	2–1	Coliseo de Puerto Rico (3,217); San Juan, PR
2008/11/21*; 10:00 am		vs. Fairfield	W 87–59	3–1	Coliseo de Puerto Rico; San Juan, PR
2008/11/23*; 11:30 pm, ESPNU		vs. No. 19 USC	W 83–72	4–1	Coliseo de Puerto Rico; San Juan, PR
2008/11/30*; 3:00 pm		Oral Roberts	W 92–83	5–1	Mizzou Arena (5,229); Columbia, MO
2008/12/2*; 7:00 pm		Arkansas–Pine Bluff	W 95–41	6–1	Mizzou Arena (5,502); Columbia, MO
2008/12/7*; 2:00 pm, ESPNU		California	W 93–66	7–1	Mizzou Arena (8,310); Columbia, MO
2008/12/13*; 6:00 pm		Murray State	W 75–64	8–1	Mizzou Arena (8,517); Columbia, MO
2008/12/20*; 6:00 pm		Stetson	W 78–44	9–1	Mizzou Arena (7,409); Columbia, MO
2008/12/23*; 6:30 pm, ESPN2	No. 25	vs. Illinois; Braggin' Rights	L 59–75	9–2	Scottrade Center (19,586); St. Louis, MO
2008/12/27*; 3:00 pm		SIU Edwardsville	W 107–57	10–2	Mizzou Arena (6,793); Columbia, MO
2008/12/27*; 3:00 pm		Centenary	W 80–52	11–2	Mizzou Arena (6,755); Columbia, MO
2009/1/3*; 12:00 pm		at Georgia	W 83–76	12–2	Stegeman Coliseum (8,060); Athens, GA
2009/1/6*; 8:00 pm		Coppin State	W 88–55	13–2	Mizzou Arena (7,244); Columbia, MO
Big 12 Regular Season
2009/1/10; 2:00 pm, ESPN2		at Nebraska	L 51-56	13–3 (0–1)	Bob Devaney Sports Center (11,570); Lincoln, NE
2009/1/14; 8:00 pm		Colorado	W 107–62	14–3 (1–1)	Mizzou Arena (9,171); Columbia, MO
2009/1/17; 12:30 pm		Iowa State	W 77–46	15–3 (2–1)	Mizzou Arena (12,403); Columbia, MO
2009/1/21; 8:00 pm		at Oklahoma State	W 97–95	16–3 (3–1)	Gallagher-Iba Arena (10,810); Stillwater, OK
2009/1/24; 12:30 pm		Texas Tech	W 97–86	17–3 (4–1)	Mizzou Arena (13,357); Columbia, MO
2009/1/28; 8:00 pm, FSN		at Kansas State	L 72–88	17–4 (4–2)	Bramlage Coliseum (9,665); Manhattan, KS
2009/1/31; 5:00 pm		Baylor	W 89–72	18–4 (5–2)	Mizzou Arena (15,061); Columbia, MO
2009/2/4; 8:30 pm, ESPN2		at No. 16 Texas	W 69–65	19–4 (6–2)	Frank Erwin Center (13,095); Austin, TX
2009/2/7; 5:00 pm		at Iowa State	W 82–68	20–4 (7–2)	Hilton Coliseum (11,919); Ames, IA
2009/2/9; 8:00 pm, ESPN	No. 17	No. 16 Kansas; Border War	W 62–60	21–4 (8–2)	Mizzou Arena (15,061); Columbia, MO
2009/2/14; 12:30 pm	No. 17	Nebraska	W 70–47	22–4 (9–2)	Mizzou Arena (15,061); Columbia, MO
2009/2/21; 12:30 pm	No. 11	at Colorado	W 66–53	23–4 (10–2)	Coors Events Center (6,271); Boulder, CO
2009/2/25; 8:00 pm, ESPNU	No. 11	Kansas State	W 94–74	24–4 (11–2)	Mizzou Arena (14,825); Columbia, MO
2009/3/1; 1:00 pm, CBS	No. 11	at No. 15 Kansas; Border War	L 65–90	24–5 (11–3)	Allen Fieldhouse (16,300); Lawrence, KS
2009/3/4; 8:00 pm, Big 12 Network	No. 15	No. 4 Oklahoma	W 73–64	25–5 (12–3)	Mizzou Arena (15,061); Columbia, MO
2009/3/7; 1:00 pm, ESPN2	No. 15	at Texas A&M	L 86–96	25–6 (12–4)	Reed Arena (13,007); College Station, TX
Big 12 Tournament
2009/03/11; 8:30 pm, ESPN2	No. 14	vs. Texas Tech; Quarterfinals	W 81–60	26–6 (12–4)	Ford Center (16,786); Oklahoma City, OK
2009/03/12; 8:30 pm	No. 14	vs. Oklahoma State; Semifinals	W 67–59	27–6 (12–4)	Ford Center (15,009); Oklahoma City, OK
2009/03/13; 5:00 pm, ESPN	No. 14	vs. Baylor; Championship	W 73–60	28–6 (12–4)	Ford Center (15,321); Oklahoma City, OK
NCAA Tournament
2009/03/20*; 2:10 pm, CBS	No. 9 (3)	vs. (14) Cornell; First Round	W 78–59	29–6	Taco Bell Arena (11,997); Boise, Idaho
2009/03/22*; 3:50 pm, CBS	No. 9 (3)	vs. No. 23 (6) Marquette; Second Round	W 83–79	30–6	Taco Bell Arena (12,184); Boise, Idaho
2009/03/27*; 8:37 pm, CBS	No. 9 (3)	vs. No. 3 (2) Memphis; Sweet Sixteen	W 102–91	31–6	University of Phoenix Stadium (20,201); Glendale, AZ
2009/03/29; 3:40 pm, CBS	No. 9 (3)	vs. No. 5 (1) Connecticut; Elite Eight	L 75–82	31–7	University of Phoenix Stadium (18,886); Glendale, AZ
*Non-conference game. ^{#}Rankings from AP poll. (#) Tournament seedings in parentheses. All times are in Central Standard Time.

== Roster ==
2008–09 Missouri Tigers men's basketball team
Players
Coaches

Pos.	#	Name	Height	Weight	Year	Hometown
F	1	DeMarre Carroll	6 ft 8 in (2.03 m)	225 lb (102 kg)	Sr	Birmingham, AL
G	3	Miguel Paul	6 ft 1 in (1.85 m)	172 lb (78 kg)	Fr	Lakeland, FL
G	4	J. T. Tiller	6 ft 3 in (1.91 m)	200 lb (91 kg)	Jr	Marietta, GA
F	5	Leo Lyons	6 ft 9 in (2.06 m)	244 lb (111 kg)	Sr	Kansas City, KS
G	11	Zaire Taylor	6 ft 4 in (1.93 m)	189 lb (86 kg)	RS Jr	Staten Island, NY
G	12	Marcus Denmon	6 ft 3 in (1.91 m)	185 lb (84 kg)	Fr	Kansas City, MO
G	13	Michael Anderson Jr.	6 ft 0 in (1.83 m)	183 lb (83 kg)	RS Sr	Birmingham, AL
F	15	Keith Ramsey	6 ft 9 in (2.06 m)	210 lb (95 kg)	Jr	Murfreesboro, TN
F	21	Laurence Bowers	6 ft 8 in (2.03 m)	205 lb (93 kg)	Fr	Memphis, TN
F	23	Justin Safford	6 ft 8 in (2.03 m)	230 lb (104 kg)	So	Bloomington, IL
G	24	Kim English	6 ft 6 in (1.98 m)	200 lb (91 kg)	Fr	Baltimore, MD
G	25	Jarrett Sutton	6 ft 3 in (1.91 m)	190 lb (86 kg)	So	Kansas City, MO
C	32	Steve Moore	6 ft 9 in (2.06 m)	264 lb (120 kg)	Fr	Kansas City, MO
G	33	Matt Lawrence	6 ft 7 in (2.01 m)	203 lb (92 kg)	Sr	Wildwood, MO

Head coach

- Mike Anderson (Tulsa)

Assistant coach(es)

- Melvin Watkins (Charlotte)
- Matt Zimmerman (Arkansas)
- T.J. Cleveland (Arkansas)

Legend

- (C) Team captain
- (S) Suspended
- (I) Ineligible
- (W) Walk-on
- Injured
- Current redshirt

== Rankings ==
Ranking movements Legend: ██ Increase in ranking ██ Decrease in ranking — = Not ranked
	Week																			
Poll	Pre	1	2	3	4	5	6	7	8	9	10	11	12	13	14	15	16	17	18	Final
AP	—						25	—						17	11	11	15	14	9	Not released
Coaches	—													19	10	8	12	15	9	8

== See also ==
- 2008–09 Big 12 Conference men's basketball season
- 2009 NCAA Division I men's basketball tournament
- 2008-09 NCAA Division I men's basketball season
- 2008-09 NCAA Division I men's basketball rankings
- List of NCAA Division I institutions
