= 2008–09 Texas Tech Red Raiders basketball team =

American college basketball season

2008–09 Texas Tech Red Raiders basketball
- Conference: Big 12 Conference
- South
- Record: 14–19 (3–13 Big 12)
- Head coach: Pat Knight (1st season)
- Assistant coaches: Chris Beard (8th season); Stew Robinson (6th season); Bubba Jennings (1st season)
- Home arena: United Spirit Arena

2008–09 Big 12 men's basketball standings
| | Conf. | | | | Overall |
| Team | W | | L | PCT | W | | L | PCT |
|---|---|---|---|---|---|---|---|---|
| No. 14 Kansas | 14 | – | 2 | .875 | 27 | – | 8 | .771 |
| No. 7 Oklahoma | 13 | – | 3 | .813 | 30 | – | 6 | .833 |
| No. 9 Missouri † | 12 | – | 4 | .750 | 31 | – | 7 | .816 |
| Kansas State | 9 | – | 7 | .563 | 22 | – | 12 | .647 |
| Texas | 9 | – | 7 | .563 | 23 | – | 12 | .657 |
| Texas A&M | 9 | – | 7 | .563 | 24 | – | 10 | .706 |
| Oklahoma State | 9 | – | 7 | .563 | 23 | – | 12 | .657 |
| Nebraska | 8 | – | 8 | .500 | 18 | – | 13 | .581 |
| Baylor | 5 | – | 11 | .313 | 24 | – | 15 | .615 |
| Iowa State | 4 | – | 12 | .250 | 15 | – | 17 | .469 |
| Texas Tech | 3 | – | 13 | .188 | 14 | – | 19 | .424 |
| Colorado | 1 | – | 15 | .063 | 9 | – | 22 | .290 |
† 2009 Big 12 Tournament winner Rankings from AP poll

The 2008–09 Texas Tech Red Raiders men's basketball team represented Texas Tech University during the 2008–09 NCAA Division I men's basketball season. The team plays in the Big 12 Conference at the United Spirit Arena in Lubbock, Texas. The season marked Pat Knight's first full season as head coach.

== Preseason ==
=== Personnel changes ===
Pat Knight took over the head coaching duties late in the 2007–08 season after Bob Knight resigned on February 4, 2008. This was Pat's first full season as head coach of the Red Raiders. Pat hired Bubba Jennings as an assistant coach in addition to Chris Beard and Stew Robinson.

=== Recruiting ===
College recruiting
| Name | Hometown | School | Height | Weight | Commit date |
|---|---|---|---|---|---|
| Darko Cohadarevic; PF | Liberal, KS | Seward County JC | 6 ft 9 in (2.06 m) | 245 lb (111 kg) | Mar 24, 2008 |
| Darko Cohadarevic; PF | Recruit ratings: Scout: Rivals: (N/A) | | | | |
| Nick Okorie; PG | Levelland, TX | South Plains JC | 6 ft 1 in (1.85 m) | 185 lb (84 kg) | Feb 6, 2008 |
| Nick Okorie; PG | Recruit ratings: Scout: Rivals: (N/A) | | | | |
| Tyree Graham^{[A]} SG | Durham, NC | Village Christian Academy | 6 ft 1 in (1.85 m) | 180 lb (82 kg) | Oct 26, 2007 |
| Tyree Graham^{[A]} SG | Recruit ratings: Scout: Rivals: (78) | | | | |
| Robert Lewandowski; PF | Overland Park, KS | Blue Valley Northwest HS | 6 ft 9 in (2.06 m) | 250 lb (110 kg) | Sep 13, 2007 |
| Robert Lewandowski; PF | Recruit ratings: Scout: Rivals: (40) | | | | |
| Corbin Ray; SF | Katy, TX | Taylor HS | 6 ft 8 in (2.03 m) | 210 lb (95 kg) | Apr 25, 2007 |
| Corbin Ray; SF | Recruit ratings: Scout: Rivals: (89) | | | | |
Overall recruit ranking: Scout: NR Rivals: NR ESPN: NR
Note: In many cases, Scout, Rivals, 247Sports, On3, and ESPN may conflict in their listings of height and weight.; In these cases, the average was taken. ESPN grades are on a 100-point scale.; Sources: "Texas Tech 2008 Basketball Commitments". Rivals.; "2008 Texas Tech Basketball Commits". Scout.; "ESPN". ESPN.; "Scout.com Team Recruiting Rankings". Scout.; "2008 Team Ranking". Rivals.

^{A} In January 2009, Tyree Graham announced he would be leaving the team, citing family reasons.

== Schedule ==
| Date time, TV | Rank^{#} | Opponent^{#} | Result | Record | Site city, state |
|---|---|---|---|---|---|
| November 14, 2008*; 8:00 pm | | Saint Francis | W 81–47 | 1–0 | United Spirit Arena; Lubbock, TX |
| November 17, 2008*; 7:00 pm | | Sam Houston State | W 87–76 | 2–0 | United Spirit Arena; Lubbock, TX |
| November 20, 2008*; 7:00 pm | | East Central | W 167–115 | 3–0 | United Spirit Arena; Lubbock, TX |
| November 22, 2008*; 1:00 pm | | Eastern Kentucky | W 98–84 | 4–0 | United Spirit Arena; Lubbock, TX |
| November 25, 2008*; 7:00 pm | | Southeastern Louisiana | W 74–63 | 5–0 | United Spirit Arena; Lubbock, TX |
| November 28, 2008*; 7:50 pm | | vs. No. 4 Pittsburgh; Legends Classic semifinal | L 67–80 | 5–1 | Prudential Center; Newark, NJ |
| November 29, 2008*; 5:30 pm | | vs. Mississippi State; Legends Classic third-place game | W 77–73 | 6–1 | Prudential Center; Newark, NJ |
| December 3, 2008*; 7:00 pm | | Wichita State | W 72–69 | 7–1 | United Spirit Arena; Lubbock, TX |
| December 13, 2008*; 7:05 pm | | at Lamar | L 79–85 | 7–2 | Montagne Center; Beaumont, TX |
| December 17, 2008*; 7:07 pm | | at UTEP | L 78–96 | 7–3 | Don Haskins Center; El Paso, TX |
| December 20, 2008*; 12:00 pm | | New Mexico | W 86–78 | 8–3 | United Spirit Arena; Lubbock, TX |
| December 23, 2008*; 7:00 pm | | Centenary | W 67–53 | 9–3 | United Spirit Arena; Lubbock, TX |
| December 28, 2008*; 7:00 pm, FSN | | at Stanford | L 66–111 | 9–4 | Maples Pavilion; Stanford, CA |
| January 1, 2009*; 3:00 pm | | Stephen F. Austin | W 69–55 | 10–4 | United Spirit Arena; Lubbock, TX |
| January 6, 2009*; 7:00 pm | | TCU | L 80–85 | 10–5 | United Spirit Arena; Lubbock, TX |
| January 10, 2009; 12:45 pm, Big 12 Network | | at No. 23 Baylor | L 61–73 | 10–6 | Ferrell Center; Waco, TX |
| January 17, 2009; 3:00 pm, Big 12 Network | | No. 11 Texas | L 49–71 | 10–7 | United Spirit Arena; Lubbock, TX |
| January 20, 2009; 7:00 pm | | Colorado | W 63–55 | 11–7 | United Spirit Arena; Lubbock, TX |
| January 24, 2009; 12:47 pm, Big 12 Network | | at Missouri | L 86–97 | 11–8 | Mizzou Arena; Columbia, MO |
| January 28, 2009; 8:05 pm, ESPNU | | at Texas A&M | L 70–79 | 11–9 | Reed Arena; College Station, TX |
| January 31, 2009; 7:00 pm, Big 12 Network | | Nebraska | L 69–82 | 11–10 | United Spirit Arena; Lubbock, TX |
| February 4, 2009; 8:05 pm, ESPNU | | at Oklahoma State | L 80–81 | 11–11 | Gallagher-Iba Arena; Stillwater, OK |
| February 7, 2009; 7:00 pm, ESPNU | | Baylor | W 83–76 | 12–11 | United Spirit Arena; Lubbock, TX |
| February 11, 2009; 8:00 pm, ESPNU | | at Kansas State | L 73–85 | 12–12 | Bramlage Coliseum; Manhattan, KS |
| February 14, 2009; 12:45 pm, Big 12 Network | | at No. 2 Oklahoma | L 74–95 | 12–13 | Lloyd Noble Center; Norman, OK |
| February 18, 2009; 8:30 pm, ESPN2 | | Oklahoma State | L 82–92 | 12–14 | United Spirit Arena; Lubbock, TX |
| February 21, 2009; 5:00 pm | | Texas A&M | L 73–79 | 12–15 | United Spirit Arena; Lubbock, TX |
| February 25, 2009; 8:40 pm, ESPN2 | | at No. 25 Texas | L 81–87 | 12–16 | Frank Erwin Center; Austin, TX |
| February 28, 2009; 2:30 pm, ABC | | No. 3 Oklahoma | L 63–78 | 12–17 | United Spirit Arena; Lubbock, TX |
| March 4, 2009; 8:30 pm, ESPN2 | | No. 9 Kansas | W 84–65 | 13–17 | United Spirit Arena; Lubbock, TX |
| March 7, 2009; 12:45 pm, Big 12 Network | | at Iowa State | L 76–78 | 13–18 | Hilton Coliseum; Ames, IA |
Big 12 tournament
| March 11, 2009; 8:30 pm, Big 12 Network | | vs. Texas A&M | W 88–83 | 14–18 | Ford Center; Oklahoma City, OK |
| March 12, 2009; 8:30 pm, ESPN2 | | vs. No. 14 Missouri | L 60–81 | 14–19 | Ford Center; Oklahoma City, OK |
*Non-conference game. ^{#}Rankings from AP poll. (#) Tournament seedings in parentheses.

Source for regular season
Source for Big 12 Tournament

== Notable games and events ==
=== East Central ===
In the third game of the season, Texas Tech defeated Division II opponent East Central 167–115, setting a new school record for most points scored in a game. The previous record of 128 was set in the double overtime victory over Texas on February 20, 1994. The combined total of 282 points also became a new record.

=== Wichita State ===
Texas Tech led the Wichita State Shockers 43–26 going into halftime. The lead quickly deteriorated as Wichita State went on a 12–3 run to open the second half. The Shockers eventually tied the game with about 41 seconds remaining. Mike Singletary then hit a 3-pointer with 4.1 seconds left to give the Red Raiders the win, 72–69.

=== Nebraska ===
In a 69–82 loss to Nebraska, Knight ran onto the court to argue with officials after Texas Tech player Alan Voskuil was called for a foul. After receiving two technical fouls, Knight was ejected from the game. Once in the tunnel, Knight ran back onto the court to continue arguing. Knight was not suspended, rather receiving a public reprimand from the Big 12 Conference.

=== Texas ===
The Red Raiders were without head coach Pat Knight against Texas after he was suspended for criticizing the officials in a game four days earlier against Texas A&M.

=== Kansas ===
Texas Tech upset #9 Kansas 84–65 at home on senior night. Senior Alan Voskuil had a career high 35 points, going 9–14 from 3-point range and 10–17 overall. It was Kansas' worst defeat of the season and marked their third straight loss at the United Spirit Arena.

=== Big 12 Tournament ===
The only chance the Red Raiders had at making the postseason was to win the Big 12 tournament where the winner receives an automatic bid in the NCAA tournament. Texas Tech went into the tournament as the #11 seed after losing to Iowa State 76–78 in the last game of the regular season, thus giving Iowa State the #10 seed.

==== Texas A&M ====
Texas A&M took a 29–48 lead into halftime and built it up to 21 early in the second half. In the second half, sophomore Mike Singletary scored 29 points in a row to help Texas Tech take a 79–78 lead with 39.4 seconds left in the game and eventually win 88–83. Singletary finished the game with 43 points, a career high and Big 12 tournament record for most points in a single game. Mike Singletary's 29 consecutive points is the second longest streak in NCAA history and Texas Tech's comeback from 21 points down is a Big 12 Tournament record.

==== Missouri ====
Texas Tech was able to manage a 31–31 halftime tie against #3 seed Missouri. In the second half, however, Missouri's full-court press defense allowed the Tigers to go on a 13 point run early in the second half. Mike Singletary led Texas Tech with 17 points and Missouri's DeMarre Carroll had 19 to help Missouri win 81–60.

== Awards and honors ==
Esmir Rizvic

- Academic All-Big 12 First Team

John Roberson

- All-Big 12 Honorable Mention
- USBWA All-District 7 Team

Mike Singletary

- Academic All-Big 12 Second Team
- Big 12 Championship All-Tournament Team

Alan Voskuil

- All-Big 12 Honorable Mention

== See also ==
- 2008–09 Big 12 Conference men's basketball season
