= 2008–09 Oklahoma Sooners men's basketball team =

American college basketball season

2008–09 Oklahoma Sooners men's basketball

NCAA Tournament, Elite Eight
- Conference: Big 12 Conference

Ranking
- Coaches: No. 7
- AP: No. 6
- Record: 30–6 (13–3 Big 12)
- Head coach: Jeff Capel III
- Home arena: Lloyd Noble Center

2008–09 Big 12 men's basketball standings
	Conf.				Overall
Team	W		L	PCT	W		L	PCT
No. 14 Kansas	14	–	2	.875	27	–	8	.771
No. 7 Oklahoma	13	–	3	.813	30	–	6	.833
No. 9 Missouri †	12	–	4	.750	31	–	7	.816
Kansas State	9	–	7	.563	22	–	12	.647
Texas	9	–	7	.563	23	–	12	.657
Texas A&M	9	–	7	.563	24	–	10	.706
Oklahoma State	9	–	7	.563	23	–	12	.657
Nebraska	8	–	8	.500	18	–	13	.581
Baylor	5	–	11	.313	24	–	15	.615
Iowa State	4	–	12	.250	15	–	17	.469
Texas Tech	3	–	13	.188	14	–	19	.424
Colorado	1	–	15	.063	9	–	22	.290
† 2009 Big 12 Tournament winner Rankings from AP poll

The 2008–09 Oklahoma Sooners men's basketball team represented the University of Oklahoma in the 2008–09 NCAA Division I men's basketball season. The head coach, Jeff Capel, was in his third year with the team. The team played its home games in the Lloyd Noble Center in Norman, OK.

== Roster ==
2008–09 Oklahoma Sooners men's basketball team
Players
Coaches

Pos.	#	Name	Height	Weight	Year	Hometown
F	1	Ryan Wright	6 ft 9 in (2.06 m)	234 lb (106 kg)	Jr	Mississauga, Ontario
G	3	T. J. Franklin	5 ft 11 in (1.8 m)	161 lb (73 kg)	Fr	Fort Worth, Texas
G	5	Tony Crocker	6 ft 6 in (1.98 m)	206 lb (93 kg)	Jr	San Antonio, Texas
G	11	Omar Leary	5 ft 11 in (1.8 m)	173 lb (78 kg)	Sr	Portland, Oregon
F	12	Juan Pattillo	6 ft 6 in (1.98 m)	216 lb (98 kg)	Jr	Las Vegas, Nevada
G	13	Willie Warren	6 ft 4 in (1.93 m)	207 lb (94 kg)	Fr	Fort Worth, Texas
G	20	Austin Johnson	6 ft 3 in (1.91 m)	176 lb (80 kg)	Sr	Amarillo, Texas
C	21	Orlando Allen	6 ft 11 in (2.11 m)	267 lb (121 kg)	So	Cincinnati, Ohio
F	23	Blake Griffin	6 ft 10 in (2.08 m)	251 lb (114 kg)	So	Oklahoma City, Oklahoma
F	31	Kyle Cannon	6 ft 8 in (2.03 m)	236 lb (107 kg)	So	Baltimore, Maryland
F	32	Taylor Griffin	6 ft 7 in (2.01 m)	238 lb (108 kg)	Sr	Oklahoma City, Oklahoma
G	34	Cade Davis	6 ft 5 in (1.96 m)	208 lb (94 kg)	So	Elk City, Oklahoma
G	41	Ray Willis	6 ft 6 in (1.98 m)	172 lb (78 kg)	Fr	Atlanta, Georgia
F	45	Beau Gerber	6 ft 8 in (2.03 m)	228 lb (103 kg)	Jr	Winfield, Kansas

Head coach

- Jeff Capel (Duke)

Assistant coach(es)

Legend

- (C) Team captain
- (S) Suspended
- (I) Ineligible
- (W) Walk-on
- Injured
- Current redshirt

Roster
Last update: 2009-11-09

== Recruiting ==
College recruiting information
Name	Hometown	School	Height	Weight	Commit date
Orlando Allen; C	Paris, TX	Paris JC	6 ft 10 in (2.08 m)	285 lb (129 kg)	Sep 26, 2007
Orlando Allen; C	Recruit ratings: Scout: Rivals: (N/A)				
Kyle Cannon; SF	Pasadena, TX	San Jacinto JC	6 ft 6 in (1.98 m)	215 lb (98 kg)	May 14, 2008
Kyle Cannon; SF	Recruit ratings: Scout: Rivals: (N/A)				
Juan Pattillo; PF	Twin Falls, ID	Southern Idaho JC	6 ft 7 in (2.01 m)	220 lb (100 kg)	May 1, 2008
Juan Pattillo; PF	Recruit ratings: Scout: Rivals: (N/A)				
Willie Warren; SG	Fort Worth, TX	North Crowley HS	6 ft 4 in (1.93 m)	190 lb (86 kg)	Nov 16, 2007
Willie Warren; SG	Recruit ratings: Scout: Rivals: (96)				
Ray Willis; SF	Atlanta, GA	Westlake HS	6 ft 5.5 in (1.97 m)	185 lb (84 kg)	Oct 4, 2007
Ray Willis; SF	Recruit ratings: Scout: Rivals: (91)				
Overall recruit ranking: Scout: 20 Rivals: 24 ESPN: NR
Note: In many cases, Scout, Rivals, 247Sports, On3, and ESPN may conflict in their listings of height and weight.; In these cases, the average was taken. ESPN grades are on a 100-point scale.; Sources: "Oklahoma 2008 Basketball Commitments". Rivals.; "2008 Oklahoma Basketball Commits". Scout.; "ESPN". ESPN.; "Scout.com Team Recruiting Rankings". Scout.; "2008 Team Ranking". Rivals.

== Schedule ==
Date time, TV	Rank^{#}	Opponent^{#}	Result	Record	Site (attendance) city, state
Regular season
2008/11/14*; 7:00 p.m., ESPN360	No. 12	American	W 83–54	1–0	Lloyd Noble Center (10,331); Norman, OK
2008/11/17*; 8:00 p.m., ESPNU	No. 12	Mississippi Valley State	W 94–53	2–0	Lloyd Noble Center (9,625); Norman, OK
2008/11/18*; 8:30 p.m., ESPN2	No. 12	No. 21 Davidson	W 82–78	3–0	Lloyd Noble Center (10,793); Norman, OK
2008/11/22*; 1:00 p.m., ESPN2	No. 12	Gardner–Webb	W 80–76	4–0	Lloyd Noble Center (11,076); Norman, OK
2008/11/26*; 8:00 p.m., ESPN2	No. 11	vs. UAB; Dick's Sporting Goods NIT Season Tip-Off Semifinals	W 77–67	5–0	Madison Square Garden (4,438); New York, NY
2008/11/28*; 2:30 p.m., ESPN2	No. 11	vs. No. 10 Purdue; Dick's Sporting Goods NIT Season Tip-Off Final	W 87–82 ^{OT}	6–0	Madison Square Garden (3,670); New York, NY
2008/12/04*; 6:00 p.m.	No. 6	USC	W 73–72	7–0	Lloyd Noble Center (11,499); Norman, OK
2008/12/07*; 3:05 p.m., CBS College Sports	No. 6	at Tulsa	W 69–44	8–0	BOK Center (12,671); Tulsa, OK
2008/12/10*; 7:00 p.m., ESPN360	No. 5	Maine	W 78–52	9–0	Lloyd Noble Center (10,546); Norman, OK
2008/12/13*; 3:00 p.m., ESPN2	No. 5	Utah	W 70–52	10–0	Lloyd Noble Center (11,576); Norman, OK
2008/12/20*; 1:00 p.m.	No. 4	vs. VCU; All-College Basketball Classic	W 81–70	11–0	Ford Center (8,502); Oklahoma City, Oklahoma
2008/12/22*; 8:00 p.m., ESPN360	No. 4	at Rice	W 70–58	12–0	Tudor Fieldhouse (3,345); Houston, TX
2008/12/30*; 8:05 p.m., ESPN360	No. 4	at Arkansas	L 88–96	12–1	Bud Walton Arena (19,604); Fayetteville, AR
2008/01/03*; 1:30 p.m., ESPN360	No. 4	Coppin State	W 93–62	13–1	Lloyd Noble Center (11,563); Norman, OK
2008/01/05*; 8:00 p.m., ESPN360	No. 6	Maryland Eastern Shore	W 100–64	14–1	Lloyd Noble Center (9,521); Norman, OK
2009/01/10; 12:30 p.m., Big 12 (ESPN+)	No. 6	at Kansas State	W 61–53	15–1 (1–0)	Bramlage Coliseum (12,528); Manhattan, KS
2009/01/12; 8:00 p.m., ESPN	No. 6	No. 11 Texas	W 78–63	16–1 (2–0)	Lloyd Noble Center (12,423); Norman, OK
2009/01/17; 1:00 p.m., ESPN	No. 6	at Texas A&M	W 69–63	17–1 (3–0)	Reed Arena (12,720); College Station, TX
2009/01/21; 8:00 p.m., ESPNU	No. 6	Nebraska	W 72–61	18–1 (4–0)	Lloyd Noble Center (11,261); Norman, OK
2009/01/24; 3:00 p.m., ESPNU	No. 6	Baylor	W 95–76	19–1 (5–0)	Lloyd Noble Center (12,849); Norman, OK
2009/01/26; 8:00 p.m., ESPN	No. 4	at Oklahoma State	W 89–81	20–1 (6–0)	Gallagher-Iba Arena (10,500); Stillwater, OK
2009/01/31; 12:45 p.m., Big 12 (ESPN+)	No. 4	at Iowa State	W 78–68	21–1 (7–0)	Hilton Coliseum (12,012); Ames, IA
2009/02/04; 8:00 p.m., Big 12 (ESPN+)	No. 2	Texas A&M	W 77–71	22–1 (8–0)	Lloyd Noble Center (11,494); Norman, OK
2009/02/07; 12:30 p.m., Big 12 (ESPN+)	No. 2	Colorado	W 77–72	23–1 (9–0)	Lloyd Noble Center (12,414); Norman, OK
2009/02/11; 8:00 p.m., ESPN2	No. 2	at Baylor	W 78–63	24–1 (10–0)	Ferrell Center (8,094); Waco, TX
2009/02/14; 12:30 p.m., Big 12 (ESPN+)	No. 2	Texas Tech	W 95–74	25–1 (11–0)	Lloyd Noble Center (13,245); Norman, OK
2009/02/21; 8:00 p.m, ESPN	No. 2	at Texas; ESPN College GameDay	L 68–73	25–2 (11–1)	Frank Erwin Center (16,755); Austin, TX
2009/02/23; 8:00 p.m., ESPN	No. 3	No. 15 Kansas	L 78–87	25–3 (11–2)	Lloyd Noble Center (12,625); Norman, OK
2009/02/28; 2:30 p.m., ABC	No. 3	at Texas Tech	W 78–63	26–3 (12–2)	United Spirit Arena (11,574); Lubbock, TX
2009/03/04; 8:00 p.m., Big 12 (ESPN+)	No. 4	at No. 15 Missouri	L 64–73	26–4 (12–3)	Mizzou Arena (15,061); Columbia, MO
2009/03/07; 2:30 p.m., ABC	No. 4	Oklahoma State	W 82–78	27–4 (13–3)	Lloyd Noble Center (12,483); Norman, OK
Big 12 Tournament
2009/03/11; 6:00 p.m., Big 12 Network	No. 6	vs. Oklahoma State; Phillips 66 Big 12 Conference tournament	L 70–71	27–5	Ford Center (16,787); Oklahoma City, Oklahoma
NCAA Tournament
2009/03/19; 8:56 p.m., CBS	No. 7	vs. Morgan State; First Round	W 82–54	28–5	Sprint Center (17,398); Kansas City, Missouri
2009/03/21*; 4:50 p.m., CBS	No. 7	vs. Michigan; Second Round	W 73–63	29–5	Sprint Center (18,247); Kansas City, Missouri
2009/03/27*; 6:30 p.m., CBS	No. 7	vs. No. 13 Syracuse; Sweet Sixteen	W 84–71	30–5	FedEx Forum (17,103); Memphis, TN
2009/03/29*; CBS	No. 7	vs. No. 2 North Carolina; Elite Eight	L 60–72	30–6	FedEx Forum (17,025); Memphis, TN
*Non-conference game. ^{#}Rankings from AP Poll. (#) Tournament seedings in parentheses. All times are in Central Standard Time.

== Rankings ==
Ranking movements Legend: ██ Increase in ranking ██ Decrease in ranking ( ) = First-place votes
	Week																			
Poll	Pre	1	2	3	4	5	6	7	8	9	10	11	12	13	14	15	16	17	18	Final
AP	12	12	11	6	5	4	4	4	6	6	6	4 (1)	2 (5)	2 (3)	2 (4)	3 (2)	4	6	7	Not released
Coaches	14	14	13	6	5	4	4	4	6	5	5	5	2 (3)	2 (1)	2 (1)	3	5	7	8	7
