= 2008–09 Kansas Jayhawks men's basketball team =

American college basketball season

2008–09 Kansas Jayhawks men's basketball

Big 12 regular season champions

NCAA tournament, Sweet Sixteen
- Conference: Big 12
- North

Ranking
- Coaches: No. 10
- AP: No. 14
- Record: 27–8 (14–2 Big 12)
- Head coach: Bill Self (6th Season)
- Assistant coaches: Joe Dooley (6th season); Danny Manning (2nd season); Kurtis Townsend (5th season)
- Captains: Cole Aldrich; Sherron Collins
- Home arena: Allen Fieldhouse

2008–09 Big 12 men's basketball standings
	Conf.				Overall
Team	W		L	PCT	W		L	PCT
No. 14 Kansas	14	–	2	.875	27	–	8	.771
No. 7 Oklahoma	13	–	3	.813	30	–	6	.833
No. 9 Missouri †	12	–	4	.750	31	–	7	.816
Kansas State	9	–	7	.563	22	–	12	.647
Texas	9	–	7	.563	23	–	12	.657
Texas A&M	9	–	7	.563	24	–	10	.706
Oklahoma State	9	–	7	.563	23	–	12	.657
Nebraska	8	–	8	.500	18	–	13	.581
Baylor	5	–	11	.313	24	–	15	.615
Iowa State	4	–	12	.250	15	–	17	.469
Texas Tech	3	–	13	.188	14	–	19	.424
Colorado	1	–	15	.063	9	–	22	.290
† 2009 Big 12 Tournament winner Rankings from AP poll

The 2008–09 Kansas Jayhawks men's basketball team represented the University of Kansas in the 2008–09 NCAA Division I men's basketball season, the Jayhawks' 111th basketball season. The head coach was Bill Self, serving his 6th year. The team played its home games in Allen Fieldhouse in Lawrence, Kansas, and were the defending National Champions. The AP poll released on January 26, 2009, had the Jayhawks unranked, which was the last poll in which the Jayhawks were not ranked until February 8, 2021. The following week, Kansas entered the rankings at number 21, beginning what is the longest streak in Men's Basketball history with 223 consecutive polls being ranked and achieved that record on November 30, 2020. They are 2 ahead of UCLA's 221 straight weeks that was done from 1967 to 1980.

== Pre-season ==
The 2007–08 Jayhawks finished the season 37–3 overall with a 13–3 mark in conference play. They won the Big 12 regular season men's basketball championship, which they shared with the Texas Longhorns. In post season play, the Jayhawks won the Big 12 conference tournament championship and received a No. 1 seed in the NCAA tournament. The team went on to win the national championship, 75–68, in overtime vs. the Memphis Tigers. The Jayhawks finished the season #1 in the final Coaches Poll after the tournament and were ranked 5th in the final AP Poll before the tournament. The team raised a temporary NCAA Men's Division I Basketball Championship banner to the rafters in an official ceremony to celebrate its 2008 NCAA Division I men's basketball tournament victory during Late Night in the Phog event. The official championship and final four banners were raised during the November 18 game against Florida Gulf Coast.

The Jayhawks lost five scholarship seniors from their national title team in addition to three underclassmen (Brandon Rush, Mario Chalmers, and Darrell Arthur) who opted to enter the NBA draft and eventually signed with agents. Returning from the national championship team are stars Sherron Collins, point guard, and Cole Aldrich, center. Other players returning are: seniors Matt Kleinmann and Brennan Bechard, and sophomores Brady Morningstar, Chase Buford, Tyrel Reed, and Connor Teahan.

=== Recruiting ===
Coach Self signed seven recruits for the 2008–09 season. The class was led by New Jersey twins Marcus and Markieff Morris who both played the power forward position. Another signee from New Jersey was Quintrell Thomas, who also played the power forward position. Travis Releford, a Kansas City product was the first signee for the Jayhawks and was in the mix for departed star Brandon Rush's spot in the starting rotation. Coach Self also managed to lure point guard Tyshawn Taylor to Lawrence, after he was released from his letter of intent to play for Marquette. The Jayhawks also signed junior college transfers Tyrone Appleton and Mario Little.

College recruiting
Name	Hometown	School	Height	Weight	Commit date
Tyrone Appleton; PG	Midland, Texas	Midland College (TX)	6 ft 3 in (1.91 m)	190 lb (86 kg)	Feb 25, 2008
Tyrone Appleton; PG	Recruit ratings: Scout: Rivals: (N/A)				
Mario Little; SF	Chicago, IL	Chipola Community College (FL)	6 ft 5 in (1.96 m)	210 lb (95 kg)	Oct 7, 2007
Mario Little; SF	Recruit ratings: Scout: Rivals: (N/A)				
Marcus Morris; PF	Pennsauken, NJ	Apex Academy	6 ft 9 in (2.06 m)	215 lb (98 kg)	Oct 31, 2007
Marcus Morris; PF	Recruit ratings: Scout: Rivals: (94)				
Markieff Morris; PF	Pennsauken, NJ	Apex Academy	6 ft 9 in (2.06 m)	230 lb (100 kg)	Oct 31, 2007
Markieff Morris; PF	Recruit ratings: Scout: Rivals: (93)				
Travis Releford; SG	Shawnee Mission, KS	Bishop Miege H.S. (KS)	6 ft 5 in (1.96 m)	190 lb (86 kg)	Jun 19, 2007
Travis Releford; SG	Recruit ratings: Scout: Rivals: (95)				
Tyshawn Taylor; PG	Jersey City, NJ	Saint Anthony's H.S. (NJ)	6 ft 2 in (1.88 m)	185 lb (84 kg)	Apr 29, 2008
Tyshawn Taylor; PG	Recruit ratings: Scout: Rivals: (92)				
Quintrell Thomas; PF	Elizabeth, NJ	Saint Patrick's H.S. (NJ)	6 ft 7 in (2.01 m)	220 lb (100 kg)	Oct 23, 2007
Quintrell Thomas; PF	Recruit ratings: Scout: Rivals: (95)				
Overall recruit ranking: Scout: 12 Rivals: 2 ESPN: 5
Note: In many cases, Scout, Rivals, 247Sports, On3, and ESPN may conflict in their listings of height and weight.; In these cases, the average was taken. ESPN grades are on a 100-point scale.; Sources: "Kansas 2008 Basketball Commitments". Rivals.; "2008 Kansas Basketball Commits". Scout.; "ESPN". ESPN.; "Scout.com Team Recruiting Rankings". Scout.; "2008 Team Ranking". Rivals.

== Season summary ==
Kansas finished the regular season 25–6 (14–2). After being picked to tie for 3rd in the conference in preseason, the Jayhawks defied expectations and won their 5th straight Big 12 conference championship and 52nd overall.

=== Awards ===
- Bill Self
  - Big 12 Coach of the Year
  - AP Coach of the Year
  - USBWA Coach of the Year (Henry Iba Award).
  - Sporting News Coach of the Year
  - Athlon Sports Coach of the Year
  - USBWA District VI Coach of the Year
  - Yahoo Sports Coach of the Year
  - CBS/Chevrolet Coach of the Year
  - ESPN Coach of the Year
- Cole Aldrich
  - All-Big 12 First Team
  - Big 12 All-Defensive Team
  - Big 12 Defensive Co-Player of the Year
  - Big 12 All-Academic Team
  - AP All-American Honorable Mention
  - Athlon Sports National Most Improved Player of the Year
  - NABC District 8 First Team
  - USBWA All-District VI Team
  - NCAA Tournament All-Midwest Regional Team
- Sherron Collins
  - All-Big 12 First Team (unanimous selection)
  - AP All-American Third Team
  - CBSSports.com All-American Third Team
  - Sporting News Third Team All-American
  - USBWA All-District VI Team
  - USBWA Second Team All-American.
  - NABC District 8 First Team
  - Finalist, Oscar Robertson Trophy
  - Finalist, Bob Cousy Award
- Marcus Morris
  - Big 12 All-Rookie Team
- Tyshawn Taylor
  - Big 12 All-Rookie Team (unanimous selection)
- Tyrel Reed
  - Big 12 All-Academic Team
- Matt Kleinmann
  - Big 12 All-Academic Team

== Roster ==
Name	#	Position	Height	Weight	Year	Home Town
Cole Aldrich	45	Center	6–11	245	Sophomore	Bloomington, MN
Tyrone Appleton	32	Guard	6–4	190	Junior	Midland, Texas
Brennan Bechard	10	Guard	6–0	183	Senior	Lawrence, KS
Chase Buford	41	Guard	6–3	200	Sophomore	San Antonio, Texas
Sherron Collins	4	Guard	5–11	200	Junior	Chicago, IL
Jordan Juenemann	40	Guard	6–4	195	Freshman	Hays, KS
Matt Kleinmann	54	Center	6–10	247	Senior	Overland Park, KS
Mario Little	23	Forward	6–5	210	Junior	Marianna, FL
Brady Morningstar	12	Guard	6–3	185	Sophomore	Lawrence, KS
Marcus Morris	22	Forward	6–9	230	Freshman	Pennsauken, NJ
Markieff Morris	21	Forward	6–10	220	Freshman	Pennsauken, NJ
Tyrel Reed	14	Guard	6–4	180	Sophomore	Burlington, KS
Travis Releford	24	Guard	6–6	190	Freshman	Shawnee Mission, KS
Tyshawn Taylor	15	Guard	6–3	160	Freshman	Jersey City, NJ
Conner Teahan	2	Guard	6–5	200	Sophomore	Leawood, KS
Quintrell Thomas	11	Forward	6–8	225	Freshman	Elizabeth, NJ

== Schedule ==
Date time, TV	Rank^{#}	Opponent^{#}	Result	Record	Site (attendance) city, state
Summer Canadian Exhibition Games
2008/08/30*; 10:00 a.m.		McGill University	W 72–67		Montpetit Hall Gym; Ottawa, Ontario, Canada
2008/08/30*; 6:00 p.m.		Carleton University	W 84–83		Scotiabank Place; Ottawa, Canada
2008/08/31*; 6:00 p.m.		University of Ottawa	W 95–60		Montpetit Hall Gym; Ottawa, Canada
Exhibition
2008/11/4*; 7:00 p.m., Jayhawk-TV	No. 24	Washburn	W 98–79		Allen Fieldhouse; Lawrence, KS
2008/11/11*; 7:00 p.m., Jayhawk-TV	No. 24	Emporia State	W 103–58		Allen Fieldhouse; Lawrence, KS
Regular season
2008/11/16*; 7:00 p.m., ESPNU	No. 24	UMKC; CBE Classic First Round	W 71–56	1–0	Allen Fieldhouse (16,300); Lawrence, KS
2008/11/18*; 8:00 p.m., ESPNU	No. 24	Florida Gulf Coast; CBE Classic Second Round	W 85–45	2–0	Allen Fieldhouse (16,300); Lawrence, KS
2008/11/24*; 9:00 p.m., ESPN2	No. 22	vs. Washington; CBE Classic Semifinal	W 73–54	3–0	Sprint Center (14,720); Kansas City, MO
2008/11/25*; 9:15 p.m., ESPN2	No. 22	vs. Syracuse; CBE Classic Championship	L 81–89 ^{OT}	3–1	Sprint Center (16,988); Kansas City, MO
2008/11/28*; 7:00 p.m., Jayhawk-TV	No. 22	Coppin State	W 85–53	4–1	Allen Fieldhouse (16,300); Lawrence, KS
2008/12/1*; 8:00 p.m., ESPNU		Kent State	W 87–60	5–1	Allen Fieldhouse (16,300); Lawrence, KS
2008/12/3*; 7:00 p.m., Jayhawk-TV		New Mexico State	W 100–79	6–1	Allen Fieldhouse (16,300); Lawrence, KS
2008/12/6*; 1:00 p.m., Jayhawk-TV		Jackson State	W 86–62	7–1	Allen Fieldhouse (16,300); Lawrence, KS
2008/12/13*; 1:00 p.m., ESPN	No. 25	vs. Massachusetts	L 60–61	7–2	Sprint Center (17,252); Kansas City, MO
2008/12/20*; 1:30 p.m., ESPN2		Temple	W 71–59	8–2	Allen Fieldhouse (16,300); Lawrence, KS
2008/12/23*; 9:30 p.m., FSN		at Arizona; Fiesta Bowl Classic & Big 12/Pac-10 Series	L 67–84	8–3	McKale Center (14,156); Tucson, AZ
2008/12/30*; 8:00 p.m., ESPNU		Albany	W 79–43	9–3	Allen Fieldhouse (16,300); Lawrence, KS
2009/1/03*; 1:00 p.m., ESPN		No. 14 Tennessee	W 92–85	10–3	Allen Fieldhouse (16,300); Lawrence, KS
2009/1/06*; 7:00 p.m., Jayhawk-TV		Siena	W 91–84	11–3	Allen Fieldhouse (16,300); Lawrence, KS
2009/1/10*; 1:00 p.m., CBS		at No. 8 Michigan State	L 62–75	11–4	Breslin Center (14,759); East Lansing, MI
2009/1/13; 7:00 p.m., Big 12 (ESPN+)		Kansas State; Sunflower Showdown	W 87–71	12–4 (1–0)	Allen Fieldhouse (16,300); Lawrence, KS
2009/1/17; 2:30 p.m., ABC		at Colorado	W 73–56	13–4 (2–0)	Coors Events Center (10,212); Boulder, CO
2009/1/19; 8:00 p.m., ESPN		Texas A&M	W 73–53	14–4 (3–0)	Allen Fieldhouse (16,300); Lawrence, KS
2009/1/24; 1:00 p.m., ESPN		at Iowa State	W 82–67	15–4 (4–0)	Hilton Coliseum (13,170); Ames, IA
2009/1/28; 6:30 p.m., ESPN2		at Nebraska	W 68–62	16–4 (5–0)	Bob Devaney Sports Center (11,407); Lincoln, NE
2009/1/31; 3:00 p.m., ESPNU		Colorado	W 66–61	17–4 (6–0)	Allen Fieldhouse (16,300); Lawrence, KS
2009/2/2; 8:00 p.m., ESPN	No. 21	at Baylor	W 75–65	18–4 (7–0)	Ferrell Center (9,028); Waco, Texas
2009/2/7; 2:30 p.m., ABC	No. 21	Oklahoma State	W 78–67	19–4 (8–0)	Allen Fieldhouse (16,300); Lawrence, KS
2009/2/9; 8:00 p.m., ESPN	No. 16	at No. 17 Missouri; Border War	L 60–62	19–5 (8–1)	Mizzou Arena (15,061); Columbia, MO
2009/2/14; 2:30 p.m., ABC	No. 16	at Kansas State; Sunflower Showdown	W 85–74	20–5 (9–1)	Bramlage Coliseum (12,528); Manhattan, KS
2009/2/18; 7:00 p.m., Big 12 (ESPN+)	No. 15	Iowa State	W 72–55	21–5 (10–1)	Allen Fieldhouse (16,300); Lawrence, KS
2009/2/21; 3:00 p.m., Big 12 (ESPN+)	No. 15	Nebraska	W 70–53	22–5 (11–1)	Allen Fieldhouse (16,300); Lawrence, KS
2009/2/23; 8:00 p.m., ESPN	No. 15	at No. 3 Oklahoma	W 87–78	23–5 (12–1)	Lloyd Noble Center (12,625); Norman, OK
2009/3/1; 1:00 p.m., CBS	No. 15	No. 11 Missouri; Border War	W 90–65	24–5 (13–1)	Allen Fieldhouse (16,300); Lawrence, KS
2009/3/4; 8:30 p.m., ESPN2	No. 9	at Texas Tech	L 65–84	24–6 (13–2)	United Spirit Arena (9,883); Lubbock, Texas
2009/3/7; 3:00 p.m., CBS	No. 9	Texas	W 83–73	25–6 (14–2)	Allen Fieldhouse (16,300); Lawrence, KS
Big 12 Tournament
2009/03/12; 11:30 a.m., ESPN2	No. 11	vs. Baylor; Quarterfinals	L 64–71	25–7	Ford Center (14,909); Oklahoma City, Oklahoma
NCAA Tournament
2009/03/20; 11:30 a.m., CBS	No. 14 (3)	vs. (14) North Dakota State; First Round	W 84–74	26–7	Hubert H. Humphrey Metrodome (15,794); Minneapolis, Minnesota
2009/03/22; 1:30 p.m., CBS	No. 14 (3)	vs. (11) Dayton; Second Round	W 60–43	27–7	Hubert H. Humphrey Metrodome (14,279); Minneapolis, Minnesota
2009/03/27; 8:37 p.m., CBS	No. 14 (3)	vs. No. 8 (2) Michigan State; Sweet Sixteen	L 62–67	27–8	Lucas Oil Stadium (33,780); Indianapolis, Indiana
*Non-conference game. ^{#}Rankings from AP poll, NCAA tournament seeds shown in parentheses. (#) Tournament seedings in parentheses. All times are in Central Standard Time.

== Rankings ==
Poll	Pre	Wk 1	Wk 2	Wk 3	Wk 4	Wk 5	Wk 6	Wk 7	Wk 8	Wk 9	Wk 10	Wk 11	Wk 12	Wk 13	Wk 14	Wk 15	Wk 16	Wk 17	Wk 18	Final
AP	24	24	22	NR	25	NR	NR	NR	NR	NR	NR	NR	21	16	15	15	9	11	14	N/A
Coaches	23	24	23	25	23	NR	NR	NR	NR	NR	NR	NR	24	16	18	15	9	11	13	10
