= 2008–09 Texas A&M Aggies men's basketball team =

American college basketball season

2008–09 Texas A&M Aggies men's basketball

NCAA tournament, second round
- Conference: Big 12 Conference
- Record: 24–10 (9–7 Big 12)
- Head coach: Mark Turgeon
- Assistant coaches: Scott Spinelli; Pooh Williamson; Bill Walker
- Home arena: Reed Arena

2008–09 Big 12 men's basketball standings
	Conf.				Overall
Team	W		L	PCT	W		L	PCT
No. 14 Kansas	14	–	2	.875	27	–	8	.771
No. 7 Oklahoma	13	–	3	.813	30	–	6	.833
No. 9 Missouri †	12	–	4	.750	31	–	7	.816
Kansas State	9	–	7	.563	22	–	12	.647
Texas	9	–	7	.563	23	–	12	.657
Texas A&M	9	–	7	.563	24	–	10	.706
Oklahoma State	9	–	7	.563	23	–	12	.657
Nebraska	8	–	8	.500	18	–	13	.581
Baylor	5	–	11	.313	24	–	15	.615
Iowa State	4	–	12	.250	15	–	17	.469
Texas Tech	3	–	13	.188	14	–	19	.424
Colorado	1	–	15	.063	9	–	22	.290
† 2009 Big 12 Tournament winner Rankings from AP poll

The 2008–09 Texas A&M Aggies men's basketball team represented Texas A&M University in the 2008–09 NCAA Division I men's basketball season. The team was led by second-year head coach Mark Turgeon, who coached the team to a 25–11 record and an NCAA tournament appearance in his first season.

The Aggies went 14–1 in nonconference play, with wins over Alabama, Arizona, and LSU; the one loss was handed by Tulsa.

== Leading into the season ==
Josh Carter and Bryan Davis received preseason Big 12 honorable mention. The team did not make the top 25 of the preseason AP or Coaches polls, though received votes.

During the 2009 signing period, the Aggies signed Naji Hibbert, Khris Middleton, Kourtney Roberson, and Ray Turner, who are all listed in the Rivals.com Top 150 prospects for the class of 2009. Hibbert, a Rivals four-star, is the highest-ranked recruit at No. 88. The recruiting class placed 23rd in the Rivals' early signing period national rankings compiled on 12 November 2008. ESPN's recruiting services ranked the class 25th in November as well.

=== 2008 recruiting class ===
College recruiting information
Name	Hometown	School	Height	Weight	Commit date
James Blasczyk; PF	Friendswood, TX	Friendswood HS	6 ft 10 in (2.08 m)	185 lb (84 kg)	Jun 23, 2008
James Blasczyk; PF	Recruit ratings: Scout: Rivals: (71)				
Dashan Harris; PG	Montverde, FL	Montverde Academy	6 ft 0 in (1.83 m)	170 lb (77 kg)	Aug 17, 2007
Dashan Harris; PG	Recruit ratings: Scout: Rivals: (93)				
David Loubeau; PF	Davie, FL	Westlake Preparatory School	6 ft 8 in (2.03 m)	210 lb (95 kg)	Sep 10, 2007
David Loubeau; PF	Recruit ratings: Scout: Rivals: (95)				
Overall recruit ranking: Scout: NR Rivals: NR ESPN: NR
Note: In many cases, Scout, Rivals, 247Sports, On3, and ESPN may conflict in their listings of height and weight.; In these cases, the average was taken. ESPN grades are on a 100-point scale.; Sources: "Texas A&M 2008 Basketball Commitments". Rivals.; "2008 Texas A&M Basketball Commits". Scout.; "ESPN". ESPN.; "Scout.com Team Recruiting Rankings". Scout.; "2008 Team Ranking". Rivals.

== Roster ==
2009–10 Texas A&M Aggies men's basketball team
Players
Coaches

Pos.	#	Name	Height	Weight	Year	Hometown
C	12	James Blasczyk	7 ft 0 in (2.13 m)	235 lb (107 kg)	RS Fr	Houston, Texas
F	50	Marshall Carrell	6 ft 8 in (2.03 m)	210 lb (95 kg)	So	Paris, Texas
G	23	Josh Carter	6 ft 7 in (2.01 m)	200 lb (91 kg)	Sr	Dallas, Texas
G	31	Chris Chapman	5 ft 11 in (1.8 m)	175 lb (79 kg)	Jr	Houston, Texas
G	14	Andrew Darko	6 ft 0 in (1.83 m)	170 lb (77 kg)	So	Conroe, Texas
F	0	Bryan Davis	6 ft 9 in (2.06 m)	240 lb (109 kg)	Jr	Dallas, Texas
F	41	Chinemelu Elonu	6 ft 10 in (2.08 m)	235 lb (107 kg)	Jr	Houston, Texas
G	40	Bryson Graham	6 ft 3 in (1.91 m)	195 lb (88 kg)	Sr	San Antonio, Texas
G	5	Dash Harris	6 ft 1 in (1.85 m)	175 lb (79 kg)	Fr	Los Angeles, California
G	11	B.J. Holmes	6 ft 0 in (1.83 m)	175 lb (79 kg)	So	Houston, Texas
G	2	Derrek Lewis	6 ft 5 in (1.96 m)	195 lb (88 kg)	So	Tulsa, Oklahoma
F	10	David Loubeau	6 ft 9 in (2.06 m)	215 lb (98 kg)	Fr	Miami, Florida
G	3	Derrick Roland	6 ft 4 in (1.93 m)	185 lb (84 kg)	Jr	Dallas, Texas
G	24	Shawn Schepel	6 ft 4 in (1.93 m)	205 lb (93 kg)	So	Dallas, Texas
G	15	Donald Sloan	6 ft 3 in (1.91 m)	205 lb (93 kg)	Jr	Dallas, Texas
F	45	Nathan Walkup	6 ft 7 in (2.01 m)	205 lb (93 kg)	So	Houston, Texas

Head coach

- Mark Turgeon (Kansas)

Assistant coach(es)

- Scott Spinelli (Boston University)
- Pooh Williamson (Tulsa)
- Bill Walker (UAB)

Legend

- (C) Team captain
- (S) Suspended
- (I) Ineligible
- (W) Walk-on
- Injured
- Current redshirt

Roster
Last update: 31 July 2011

== Season accomplishments ==
- In the Florida A&M game, the team set a Big 12 game record after shooting all 20 of its free throws. Chinemelu Elonu recorded six blocked shots, the third most in school history. Donald Sloan also scored a season-high of 21 points.
- Three players—Chinemelu Elonu, Bryson Graham, and Nathan Walkup—made the season's Academic All-Big 12 team. Elonu made the first team (GPA of 3.20+) while Graham and Walkup made the second team (GPA of 3.00–3.19).
- Josh Carter became an All-Big 12 Third Team selection, while Derrick Roland was selected to the Big 12 All-Defensive Team.

== Schedule ==
Date time, TV	Rank^{#}	Opponent^{#}	Result	Record	Site (attendance) city, state
Exhibition
11/05/08*; 7:30 p.m.		Texas A&M–Kingsville	W 72–59	0–0	Reed Arena (7,963); College Station, TX
Regular season
11/16/08*; 5:00 p.m.		Arkansas–Pine Bluff	W 76–47	1–0	Reed Arena (7,354); College Station, TX
11/18/08*; 7:00 p.m.		Stephen F. Austin	W 55–48	2–0	Reed Arena (7,595); College Station, TX
11/21/08*; 7:00 p.m.		Jackson State; South Padre Invitational	W 96–78	3–0	Reed Arena (7,866); College Station, TX
11/25/08*; 7:00 p.m.		UNC Wilmington; South Padre Invitational	W 84–65	4–0	Reed Arena (6,881); College Station, TX
11/28/08*; 7:30 p.m., FCS		vs. Tulsa; South Padre Invitational	L 56-67	4–1	South Padre Convention Centre (N/A); South Padre
11/29/08*; TBA		vs. Kent State; South Padre Invitational	W 77–71	5–1	South Padre Convention Centre (1632); South Padre
12/05/08*; 8:30 p.m., ESPNU		Arizona	W 67–66	6–1	Reed Arena (10,393); College Station, TX
12/13/08*; 7:00 p.m., ESPN Full Court		at Alabama	W 86–78^{OT}	7–1	Coleman Coliseum (9,316); Tuscaloosa, AL
12/15/08*; 7:00 p.m., FSN		Florida A&M	W 67–57	8–1	Reed Arena (7,334); College Station, TX
12/17/08*; 7:00 p.m., FSN		SMU	W 66–56	9–1	Reed Arena (7,888); College Station, TX
12/20/08*; 4:00 p.m.		vs. LSU	W 72–61	10–1	Toyota Center (N/A); Houston, TX
12/28/08*; 7:00 p.m., FSN		Sam Houston State	W 60–50	11–1	Reed Arena (9,371); College Station, TX
12/31/08*; 3:00 p.m.		at Rice	W 72–60	12–1	Tudor Fieldhouse (5,208); Houston, TX
01/03/09*; 8:00 p.m.		McNeese State	W 57–52	13–1	Reed Arena (11,029); College Station, TX
01/05/09*; 7:00 p.m., FSN		North Dakota	W 76–62	14–1	Reed Arena (6,066); College Station, TX
01/10/09; 8:00 p.m., ESPNU		at Oklahoma State	L 61-72	14–2 (0–1)	Gallagher-Iba Arena (10,264); Stillwater, OK
01/14/09; 8:30 p.m., ESPN2		No. 21 Baylor	W 84–73	15–2 (1–1)	Reed Arena (9,537); College Station, TX
01/17/09; 1:00 p.m., ESPN		No. 5 Oklahoma	L 63-69	15–3 (1–2)	Reed Arena (12,720); College Station, TX
01/19/09; 1:00 p.m., ESPN		at Kansas	L 53-73	15–4 (1–3)	Allen Fieldhouse (16,300); Lawrence, KS
01/24/09; 7:00 p.m., ESPNU		at No. 15 Texas	L 58-67	15–5 (1–4)	Frank Erwin Center (16,755); Austin, TX
01/28/09; 8:00 p.m., ESPNU		Texas Tech	W 79–70	16–5 (2–4)	Reed Arena (10,273); College Station, TX
01/31/09; 1:00 p.m., ESPN		Oklahoma State	W 76–64	17–5 (3–4)	Reed Arena (11,178); College Station, TX
02/04/09; 8:00 p.m., Big 12		at No. 2 Oklahoma	L 71-77	17–6 (3–5)	Lloyd Noble Center (11,494); Norman, OK
02/07/09; 3:00 p.m., Big 12		Kansas State	L 60-65	17–7 (3–6)	Reed Arena (10,367); College Station, TX
02/14/09; 5:00 p.m., FSN		at Baylor	L 68-72	17–8 (3–7)	Ferrell Center (10,407); Waco, TX
02/16/09; 8:00 p.m., ESPN		Texas	W 81–66	18–8 (4–7)	Reed Arena (11,321); College Station, TX
02/21/09; 5:00 p.m., ESPN Full Court		at Texas Tech	W 79–73	19–8 (5–7)	United Spirit Arena (10,551); Lubbock, TX
02/24/09; 8:30 p.m., ESPN2		at Nebraska	W 57–55	20–8 (6–7)	Bob Devaney Sports Center (9,009); Lincoln, NE
02/28/09; 12:30 p.m., Big 12		Iowa State	W 87–69	21–8 (7–7)	Reed Arena (9,701); College Station, TX
03/04/09; 8:00 p.m., ESPNU		at Colorado	W 72–66	22–8 (8–7)	Coors Events Center (4,973); Boulder, CO
03/07/09; 1:00 p.m., ESPN2		No. 12 Missouri	W 96–86	23–8 (9–7)	Reed Arena (13,007); College Station, TX
Big 12 Tournament
03/11/09; 8:30 p.m., Big 12		vs. Texas Tech; Phillips 66 Big 12 Conference tournament	L 83-88	23–9	Ford Center; Oklahoma City, OK
NCAA Tournament
03/19/09; 11:30 a.m., CBS		vs. BYU; First Round	W 79–66	24–9	Wachovia Center; Philadelphia, PA
03/21/09; 2:35 p.m., CBS		vs. UConn; Second Round	L 66-92	24–10	Wachovia Center; Philadelphia, PA
*Non-conference game. ^{#}Rankings from Coaches Poll. (#) Tournament seedings in parentheses. All times are in Central Standard Time.
