= Terrel Harris =

American basketball player (born 1987)

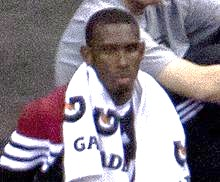
- Harris with the Miami Heat in 2011

Personal information
- Born: August 10, 1987 (age 39) Dallas, Texas, U.S.
- Listed height: 6 ft 4 in (1.93 m)
- Listed weight: 190 lb (86 kg)

Career information
- High school: South Garland (Garland, Texas)
- College: Oklahoma State (2005–2009)
- NBA draft: 2009: undrafted
- Playing career: 2009–2015
- Position: Shooting guard
- Number: 14, 12

Career history
- 2009–2010: Strasbourg IG
- 2010: Maine Red Claws
- 2010–2011: Rio Grande Valley Vipers
- 2011: EnBW Ludwigsburg
- 2011: Rio Grande Valley Vipers
- 2011–2013: Miami Heat
- 2013: Rio Grande Valley Vipers
- 2013: New Orleans Hornets
- 2013–2014: Texas Legends
- 2014: Bakersfield Jam
- 2014–2015: Maccabi Ashdod

Career highlights
- NBA champion (2012); Big 12 All-Defensive team (2009)
- Stats at NBA.com
- Stats at Basketball Reference

Terrel Andre Harris (born August 10, 1987) is an American former professional basketball player who most recently served as a player development coach for the Philadelphia 76ers of the National Basketball Association (NBA). He played college basketball for the Oklahoma State Cowboys.

== High school and college ==
Harris attended South Garland High School in Garland, Texas, where he was unanimously voted District 11-5A MVP and also voted 1st team All State as a senior. He played college basketball at Oklahoma State University from 2005 to 2009 and majored in education. He appeared in 134 career games and averaged 9.8 points per game, 4.0 rebounds per game, 1.5 assists per game, and 1.3 steals per game in 26.4 minutes per game. He shot 43.9 percent from the field, 36.3 percent from three-point range and 81.5 percent from the free throw line. He averaged 14 points and 5 rebounds in 32 minutes per game during his senior year while starting all 35 games. He also received an All–Big 12 Honorable Mention and was named to the Big 12 All–Defensive Team.

== Professional ==
Not selected in the 2009 NBA draft, Harris began his professional career in France with Strasbourg IG, signing with the team on August 23, 2009. In nine games, Harris averaged 6.8 points, 1.9 rebounds, 1.7 assists, and 1.11 steals and made 37.5% of field goal attempts. On January 7, 2010, Harris signed with the Maine Red Claws of the NBA Development League; the Red Claws waived Harris in March 2010. By the end of March 2010, Harris signed with the D-League team Rio Grande Valley Vipers. In September and October 2011, Harris played with EnBW Ludwigsburg of Basketball Bundesliga in Germany.

After beginning the 2011–12 season with the Vipers, Harris was invited to the Miami Heat's training camp on December 12, 2011. On December 24, 2011, it was officially announced that Harris had made the Heat's final roster. On January 5, 2012, against the Atlanta Hawks, Harris posted a career-high 14 rebounds along with 9 points. On April 6, 2012, Harris scored a career-high 10 points against the Memphis Grizzlies. Harris won an NBA championship with the Heat on June 21, 2012.

On July 4, 2012, the Heat declined to extend a qualifying offer to Harris, making him an unrestricted free agent. He was re-signed by the Heat on September 11, 2012. The Heat waived him on January 5, 2013. After being waived by the Heat, he was re-acquired by the Vipers.

On March 5, 2013, Harris was traded to the Erie BayHawks.

On March 8, 2013, Harris signed a ten-day contract with the New Orleans Hornets. He signed a second ten-day contract on March 18, and signed for the remainder of the season on March 28. In April 2013, the Hornets were renamed the Pelicans.

On July 10, 2013, the Pelicans sent Harris and teammate Robin Lopez to the Portland Trail Blazers as part of a three-way trade that also involved the Sacramento Kings.

Harris was waived by the Trail Blazers on September 23, 2013.

On October 31, 2013, he was acquired by the Erie BayHawks. On November 4, 2013, he was traded to the Texas Legends. On February 20, 2014, he was traded to the Bakersfield Jam.

On August 22, 2014, Harris signed with Maccabi Ashdod of Israel for the 2014–15 season.

== Personal life ==
Harris has two siblings: a brother, Kendal, a top-rated point guard in the 2013 class, and a sister, Tresa. His mother is Jackie Harris. While in college at Oklahoma State, Harris majored in education. He wears size 13 sneakers. His cousins are Keaton Wallace (Atlanta Hawks) & Cason Wallace of the Oklahoma City Thunder.

== NBA career statistics ==
Legend
GP	Games played	GS	Games started	MPG	Minutes per game
FG%	Field goal percentage	3P%	3-point field goal percentage	FT%	Free throw percentage
RPG	Rebounds per game	APG	Assists per game	SPG	Steals per game
BPG	Blocks per game	PPG	Points per game	**Bold**	Career high
†	Won an NBA championship

=== Regular season ===
Year	Team	GP	GS	MPG	FG%	3P%	FT%	RPG	APG	SPG	BPG	PPG
2011–12†	Miami	**22**	**1**	**14.5**	**.349**	**.205**	.667	**2.3**	**1.2**	**.4**	.1	**3.6**
2012–13	Miami	7	0	4.1	.250	.000	**.750**	1.3	.3	.0	.0	1.4
2012–13	New Orleans	13	0	8.3	.105	.000	.500	1.3	.5	.2	**.2**	.4
Career		42	1	10.8	.300	.170	.677	1.8	.8	.3	.1	2.3

=== Playoffs ===
Year	Team	GP	GS	MPG	FG%	3P%	FT%	RPG	APG	SPG	BPG	PPG
2012†	Miami	4	0	2.5	.500	.000	.750	.8	.0	.0	.0	1.3
Career		4	0	2.5	.500	.000	.750	.8	.0	.0	.0	1.3
