= LaceDarius Dunn =

American basketball player

Personal information
- Born: September 5, 1987 (age 39) Monroe, Louisiana, U.S.
- Listed height: 6 ft 4 in (1.93 m)
- Listed weight: 205 lb (93 kg)

Career information
- High school: Excelsior Christian School (Monroe, Louisiana)
- College: Baylor (2007–2011)
- NBA draft: 2011: undrafted
- Playing career: 2011–2024
- Position: Shooting guard
- Number: 4, 9, 24

Career history
- 2011–2012: Bnei HaSharon
- 2012–2013: Benfica
- 2013–2014: AZS Koszalin
- 2014–2015: Sakarya BB
- 2015–2016: Sigal Prishtina
- 2016–2017: Benfica
- 2017–2018: Vitória Guimarães
- 2018–2019: Final Spor
- 2019–2020: Hapoel Afula
- 2020–2022: Hapoel Hevel Modi'in
- 2022–2023: Final Spor
- 2023–2024: Sporting Alexandria

LaceDarius Dunn (born September 5, 1987) is an American former professional basketball player. He played college basketball for the Baylor Bears. As a junior in 2009–2010, Dunn was an honorable mention to the All-American team and named to the second team All Big 12 team after scoring 19.6 points per game over 36 games.

== College career ==
=== Professional speculation ===
On April 15, 2010, Dunn ended speculation that he would forgo his senior season at Baylor University and enter the 2010 NBA draft by announcing his return for the 2010–2011 season. As of April 2010, Dunn was speculated to be a second round pick in the 2011 NBA draft. He ended up being the Big 12 All Time Scoring Leader.

=== Arrest and suspension ===
On October 5, 2010, Dunn was indefinitely suspended from the Baylor Bears men's basketball team after he was arrested for aggravated assault of his girlfriend in Waco, but charges were dropped after the victim refused to press charges.

== Professional career ==
In July 2011 he signed with Bnei HaSharon in Israel for one season. In September 2012, LaceDarius signed with S.L. Benfica in Portugal At Benfica, he won the League as a key player in the team, being named Player of the Year, Newcomer of the Year, Most Improved Player of the Year, Import Player of the Year and also named on the First Team by Eurobasket.com.

On August 5, 2019, Dunn signed a one-year deal with Hapoel Afula of the Israeli National League.
