= 2008–09 Louisiana–Lafayette Ragin' Cajuns women's basketball team =

Intercollegiate basketball season

2008–09 Louisiana–Lafayette Ragin' Cajuns women's basketball

Sun Belt Tournament, First Round (L, Troy 65-68)
- Conference: Sun Belt Conference
- West Division
- Record: 4–27 (0–18 Sun Belt)
- Head coach: Errol Rogers (2nd season)
- Assistant coaches: Paula Lee; Lori Morris; Courtney Simmons
- Home arena: Earl K. Long Gymnasium

2008–09 Sun Belt Conference women's basketball standings
| | Conf. | | | | Overall |
| Team | W | | L | PCT | W | | L | PCT |
|---|---|---|---|---|---|---|---|---|
East Division
| Middle Tennessee† | 17 | – | 1 | .944 | 28 | – | 6 | .824 |
| South Alabama | 10 | – | 8 | .556 | 21 | – | 11 | .656 |
| Western Kentucky | 10 | – | 8 | .556 | 16 | – | 13 | .552 |
| Troy | 10 | – | 8 | .556 | 16 | – | 14 | .533 |
| Florida Atlantic | 9 | – | 9 | .500 | 12 | – | 17 | .414 |
| FIU | 4 | – | 14 | .222 | 6 | – | 24 | .200 |
West Division
| Arkansas–Little Rock | 16 | – | 2 | .889 | 26 | – | 7 | .788 |
| Arkansas State | 10 | – | 8 | .556 | 16 | – | 14 | .533 |
| Denver | 10 | – | 8 | .556 | 16 | – | 15 | .516 |
| New Orleans | 8 | – | 10 | .444 | 14 | – | 17 | .452 |
| Louisiana–Monroe | 7 | – | 11 | .389 | 15 | – | 16 | .484 |
| North Texas | 6 | – | 12 | .333 | 11 | – | 20 | .355 |
| Louisiana–Lafayette | 0 | – | 18 | .000 | 4 | – | 27 | .129 |
† Tournament winner Rankings from Coaches

The 2008–09 Louisiana–Lafayette Ragin' Cajuns women's basketball team represented the University of Louisiana at Lafayette during the 2008–09 NCAA Division I women's basketball season. The Ragin' Cajuns were led by second-year head coach Errol Rogers; they played their double-header home games at the Cajundome with other games at the Earl K. Long Gymnasium, which is located on campus. They were members in the Sun Belt Conference. They finished the season 4–27, 0–18 in Sun Belt play to finish dead-last (seventh place) in the West Division. They were eliminated in the first round of the Sun Belt women's tournament.

== Previous season ==
The Ragin' Cajuns finished the 2007–08 season 8–22, 4–14 in Sun Belt play to finish in dead-last (seventh place) in the West Division. They made it to the 2007 Sun Belt Conference women's basketball tournament, losing in the first round game by a low score of 40-49 to the South Alabama Jaguars. They were not invited to any other postseason tournament.

== Roster ==
2008–09 Louisiana–Lafayette Ragin' Cajuns women's basketball team
Players
Coaches

| Pos. | # | Name | Height | Year | Previous school | Hometown |
|---|---|---|---|---|---|---|
| PG | 00 | Bronson Rogers | 5 ft 5 in (1.65 m) | Jr | Itawamba CC | N/A |
| G | 1 | Michelle Brunker | 5 ft 8 in (1.73 m) | RS Fr | The Bishop's School | San Diego, CA |
| SG | 2 | Jasmine Barnes | 5 ft 7 in (1.7 m) | So | Broadmoor HS | Baton Rouge, LA |
| G | 5 | Whitney Dunlap | 5 ft 8 in (1.73 m) | RS Sr | Bishop Sullivan HS | Baton Rouge, LA |
| PG | 11 | Becky Hall | 5 ft 3 in (1.6 m) | RS Fr | Lacassine HS | Iowa, LA |
| G | 13 | Krystal Motley | 5 ft 7 in (1.7 m) | RS Fr | Mirabeau B. Lamar HS | Houston, TX |
| SG | 14 | Jamie Gunter | 5 ft 9 in (1.75 m) | RS Fr | Columbus HS | Columbus, MS |
| F | 22 | Mercedes Johnson | 5 ft 11 in (1.8 m) | RS Fr | Langham Creek HS | Houston, TX |
| F | 24 | Jessica Sigue | 5 ft 9 in (1.75 m) | So | New Iberia Senior HS | New Iberia, LA |
| SG | 25 | D'Mya Clay | 5 ft 8 in (1.73 m) | So | Columbus East HS | Columbus, IN |
| G | 32 | Nicole Morris | 5 ft 6 in (1.68 m) | RS Fr | Cy-Fair HS | Cypress, TX |
| PF | 33 | Lyndra Bell | 5 ft 10 in (1.78 m) | So | Teurlings Catholic HS | Lafayette, LA |
| F | 34 | Alexis Green | 5 ft 8 in (1.73 m) | Jr | Dallas Skyline HS | Dallas, TX |
| PF | 35 | Valanette Amie | 6 ft 2 in (1.88 m) | So | Central HS | Tulsa, OK |
| F | 50 | Amy Richard | 6 ft 1 in (1.85 m) | Jr | Rosary HS; Fullerton JC | Opelousas, LA |
| F | 52 | Keionna Ross | 6 ft 0 in (1.83 m) | RS Fr | Port Allen HS | Kenner, LA |

Head coach

- Errol Rogers (Louisiana)

Assistant coach(es)

- Paula Lee (LSU)
- Lori Morris (San Diego)
- Courtney Simmons (Louisville)
- Lindsey Breax - Manager
- Erin Kacy - Manager
- Danie Meche - Manager
- Malinda Varino - Manager
- Medgar Harrison - Strength Coach
- Victoria du Preez - Athletic Training

Legend

- (C) Team captain
- (S) Suspended
- (I) Ineligible
- (W) Walk-on
- Injured
- Current redshirt

Roster
Last update: December 28, 2019

== Schedule and results ==
| Date time, TV | Rank^{#} | Opponent^{#} | Result | Record | Site city, state |
Exhibition
| 11/04/2008*; 5:00 p.m. | | LSU–Shreveport | W 53-52 | 1-0 | Cajundome; Lafayette, LA |
Non–conference regular season
| 11/14/2008*; 7:00 p.m. | | at Texas Southern | L 39-51 | 1–1 | H&PE Arena; Houston, TX |
| 11/19/2008*; 7:00 p.m. | | Ole Miss | L 48-74 | 1–2 | Earl K. Long Gymnasium; Lafayette, LA |
| 11/21/2008*; 7:00 p.m. | | Mercer | L 62-71 | 1–3 | Earl K. Long Gymnasium; Lafayette, LA |
| 11/23/2008*; 2:00 p.m. | | Centenary | L 69-75 | 1–4 | Earl K. Long Gymnasium; Lafayette, LA |
| 11/26/2008*; 7:00 p.m. | | at Tulane | L 65-80 | 1–5 | Fogelman Arena; New Orleans, LA |
| 11/28/2008*; 2:00 p.m. | | Mississippi State | L 38-71 | 1–6 | Earl K. Long Gymnasium; Lafayette, LA |
| 12/02/2008*; 5:00 p.m. | | McNeese State | L 46-56 | 1–7 | Cajundome; Lafayette, LA |
| 12/05/2008*; 6:30 p.m. | | at Nicholls State | W 71-57 | 2–7 | Stopher Gymnasium; Thibodaux, LA |
| 12/15/2008*; 4:00 p.m. | | vs. Georgia State; UAB Blazer Invitational | L 58-68 | 2-8 | Bartow Arena; Birmingham, AL |
| 12/16/2009*; 4:00 p.m. | | vs. Alabama State; UAB Blazer Invitational | W 51-49 | 3-8 | Bartow Arena; Birmingham, AL |
Sun Belt regular season
| 12/18/2008; 5:00 p.m. | | North Texas | L 56-57 | 3-9 (0-1) | Cajundome; Lafayette, LA |
| 12/21/2008; 3:00 p.m. | | Louisiana–Monroe | L 70-81 | 3-10 (0-2) | Cajundome; Lafayette, LA |
Non-conference regular season
| 12/23/2008; 2:00 p.m. | | Savannah State | W 69-42 | 4-10 | Earl K. Long Gymnasium; Lafayette, LA |
Sun Belt regular season
| 01/03/2009; 7:15 p.m. | | Denver | L 46-67 | 4-11 (0-3) | Cajundome; Lafayette, LA |
| 01/07/2009; 7:00 p.m. | | at New Orleans | L 46-56 | 4-12 (0-4) | Human Performance Center; New Orleans, LA |
| 01/10/2009; 5:15 p.m. | | at Troy | L 47-69 | 4-13 (0-5) | Sartain Hall; Troy, AL |
| 01/14/2009; 7:00 p.m. | | Arkansas–Little Rock | L 46-77 | 4-14 (0-6) | Earl K. Long Gymnasium; Lafayette, LA |
| 01/21/2009; 7:00 p.m. | | at Western Kentucky | L 62-102 | 4-15 (0-7) | E. A. Diddle Arena; Bowling Green, KY |
| 01/24/2009; 5:00 p.m. | | South Alabama | L 52-66 | 4-16 (0-8) | Cajundome; Lafayette, LA |
| 01/28/2009; 7:00 p.m. | | at Middle Tennessee | L 57-85 | 4-17 (0-9) | Murphy Center; Murfreesboro, TN |
| 01/31/2009; 4:00 p.m. | | at Florida Atlantic | L 50-61 | 4-18 (0-10) | FAU Arena; Boca Raton, FL |
| 02/04/2009; 7:00 p.m. | | FIU | L 44-64 | 4-19 (0-11) | Earl K. Long Gymnasium; Lafayette, LA |
| 02/07/2009; 5:00 p.m. | | at North Texas | L 63-75 | 4-20 (0-12) | UNT Coliseum; Denton, TX |
| 02/11/2009; 7:00 p.m. | | at Louisiana–Monroe | L 53-82 | 4-21 (0-13) | Fant–Ewing Coliseum; Monroe, LA |
| 02/14/2009; 5:00 p.m. | | Arkansas State | L 66-74 | 4-22 (0-14) | Cajundome; Lafayette, LA |
| 02/18/2009; 7:00 p.m. | | at Denver | L 59-74 | 4-23 (0-15) | Magness Arena; Denver, CO |
| 02/22/2009; 5:00 p.m. | | New Orleans | L 62-74 | 4-24 (0-16) | Cajundome; Lafayette, LA |
| 02/25/2009; 7:00 p.m. | | Troy | L 52-93 | 4-25 (0-17) | Earl K. Long Gymnasium; Lafayette, LA |
| 02/28/2009; 4:30 p.m. | | at Arkansas–Little Rock | L 35-39 | 4-26 (0-18) | Jack Stephens Center; Little Rock, AR |
Sun Belt Women's Tournament
| 03/04/2009; 7:00 p.m. | | vs. Troy; First Round/Quarterfinals | L 65-68 | 4-27 | Trojan Arena; Troy, AL |
*Non-conference game. ^{#}Rankings from AP Poll. (#) Tournament seedings in parentheses. All times are in Central Time.

== See also ==
- 2008–09 Louisiana–Lafayette Ragin' Cajuns men's basketball team
