= 2008–09 Atlantic 10 Conference men's basketball season =

- League: NCAA Division I
- Sport: Basketball
- Duration: January 7, 2009 through March 14, 2009
- Teams: 14
- TV partner(s): CBS College Sports Network; ESPN

Regular season

Tournament

Basketball seasons
- 07–08 09–10

2008–09 Atlantic 10 men's basketball standings
	Conf.				Overall
Team	W		L	PCT	W		L	PCT
No. 20 Xavier	12	–	4	.750	27	–	8	.771
Dayton	11	–	5	.688	27	–	8	.771
Rhode Island	11	–	5	.688	23	–	11	.676
Temple†	11	–	5	.688	22	–	12	.647
Duquesne	9	–	7	.563	21	–	13	.618
La Salle	9	–	7	.563	18	–	13	.581
Richmond	9	–	7	.563	20	–	16	.556
Saint Joseph's	9	–	7	.563	17	–	15	.531
Saint Louis	8	–	8	.500	18	–	14	.563
UMass	7	–	9	.438	12	–	18	.400
St. Bonaventure	6	–	10	.375	15	–	15	.500
Charlotte	5	–	11	.313	11	–	20	.355
George Washington	4	–	12	.250	10	–	18	.357
Fordham	1	–	15	.063	3	–	25	.107
† 2009 Atlantic 10 Tournament winner Rankings from AP Poll

The 2008–09 Atlantic 10 Conference men's basketball season marked the 33rd season of Atlantic 10 Conference basketball.

== Preseason ==
Xavier University was seen as the favourite to win the league by coaches and media in the preseason poll after having won the regular season the two previous years and also reaching the Elite Eight of the NCAA tournament.

No A-10 side was in either the AP Poll or the ESPN/USA Today Coaches' poll top 25, Xavier dropping out from last season in 26th and 30th place respectively after losing 3 starters in the offseason, the university was in the lesser Sporting News Top 40 at 19th along with Saint Joseph's at 32nd and Temple at 38th.

The Musketeers' Derrick Brown along with the Owl's Dionte Christmas were named to the John R. Wooden Award preseason top 50 candidate list in November. Brown was also named to the Naismith Award watch list on December 18. Another individual award, the Lowe's Senior CLASS Award selected Christmas and Jimmy Baron of Rhode Island on their 30-man preseason candidate list.

It was speculated if Christmas would be the first player in league history to lead the A-10 in scoring three seasons in a row whilst Ahmad Nivins of Saint Joseph's and Chris Lowe of Massachusetts also aimed to lead the conference for the third time, in field goal percentage and assists respectively.

=== Atlantic 10 Preseason Poll ===
Rank	Team
1	Xavier (44)
2	Temple (12)
3	Dayton (3)
4	Saint Joseph's
5	Charlotte (2)
6	Massachusetts
7	Saint Louis
8	Richmond
9	Rhode Island
10	La Salle
11	George Washington
12	Duquesne
13	Fordham
14	St. Bonaventure

First-place votes in parentheses

=== Preseason All-A10 Team ===
First Team

- Derrick Brown, Xavier
- Dionte Christmas, Temple
- Kevin Lisch, Saint Louis
- Chris Lowe, Massachusetts
- Ahmad Nivins, Saint Joseph's

Second Team

- Rob Diggs, George Washington
- Ricky Harris, Massachusetts
- Tommie Liddell, Saint Louis
- Lamont Mack, Charlotte
- Chris Wright, Dayton

Third Team

- C. J. Anderson, Xavier
- Kevin Anderson, Richmond
- Jimmy Baron, Rhode Island
- Rodney Green, La Salle
- David Gonzalvez, Richmond

=== Preseason A10 All-Rookie Team ===
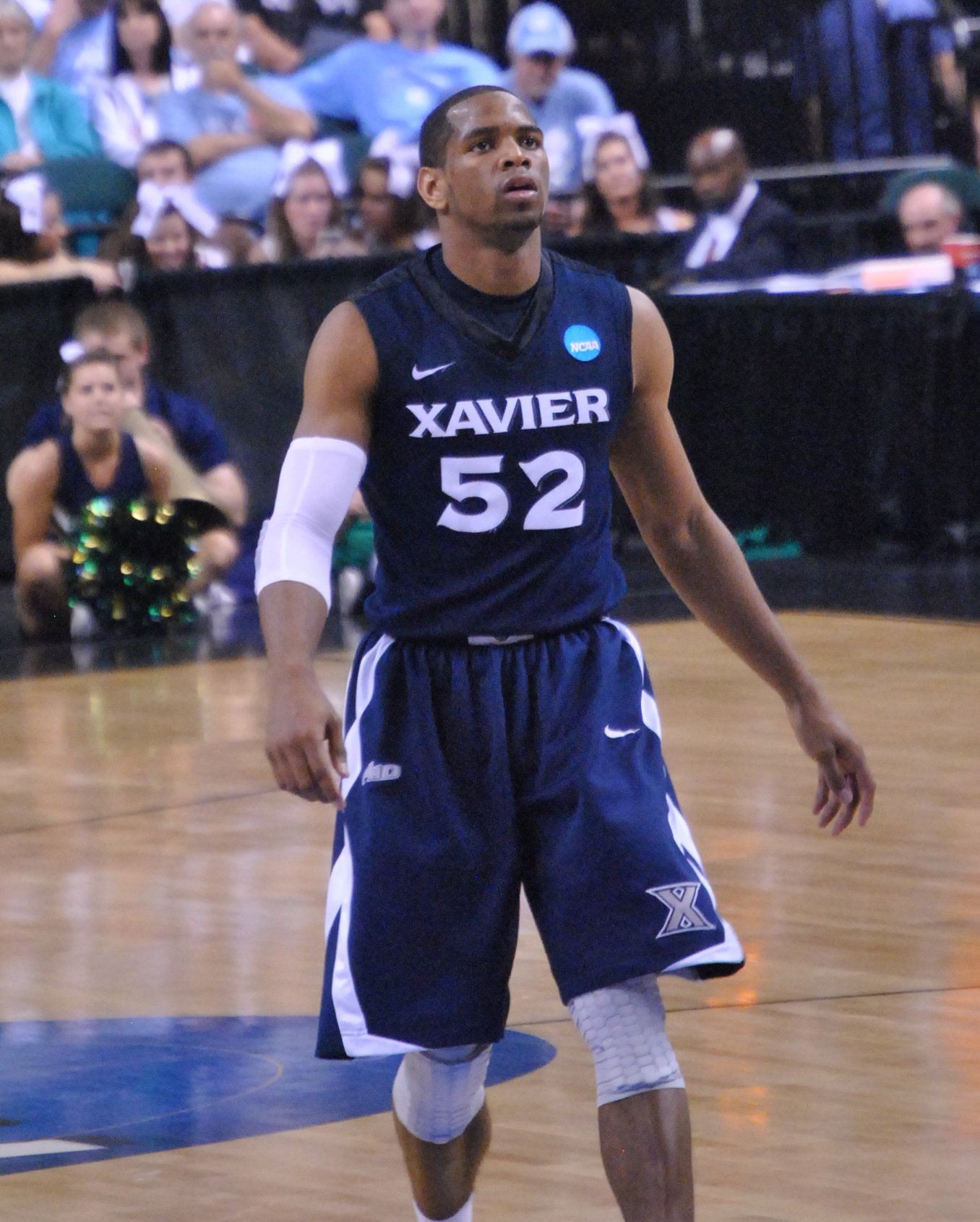
Tu Holloway

- Melquan Bolding, Duquesne
- Kenny Frease, Xavier
- Terrell Holloway, Xavier
- Mark Lyons, Xavier
- Paul Williams, Dayton

=== Preseason A10 All-Defensive Team ===
- Lavoy Allen, Temple
- Derrick Brown, Xavier
- Kevin Lisch, Saint Louis
- Chris Lowe, Massachusetts
- Garrett Williamson, Saint Joseph's

== Regular season ==
Xavier captured its third consecutive Atlantic 10 regular season crown with a 12–4 record in Conference play, it had been undefeated in conference play until four late-season losses to Duquesne, Dayton, Charlotte, and Richmond. The last A-10 program to enter the tournament as #1 seed thrice in a row was Temple in 1998–00. It moved the university into the top 25 in the national rankings (see below) of both the AP Poll (17th) and the ESPN/USA Today poll (18th).

On individual records, Temple's Dionte Christmas entered tournament play tied with Player of the Year Ahmad Nivins at 19.2 ppg in his quest to lead the conference in scoring for a record third consecutive time. Nivins' 62.5% put him in the driving seat to equal Alexander Koul's record in 1995–97 as the only players in A-10 history to lead the league in field goal percentage three consecutive years. They would both achieve these feats in post-season, Christmas with 19.5 ppg and Nivins with 61.2%, Massachusetts' Chris Lowe finished second in his similar pursuit of assists leading.

== Postseason ==
=== Atlantic 10 Tournament ===
All the games were held at the Boardwalk Hall in Atlantic City.

== Conference awards and honors ==
=== Weekly awards ===
Atlantic 10 Players of the Week
Throughout the conference season, the Atlantic 10 offices name a player and rookie of the week.

Week	Player of the week	Rookie of the week
November 16	Dionte Christmas, Temple	Trey Blue, Fordham
November 16	Ahmad Nivins, Saint Joseph's	Trey Blue, Fordham
November 23	Jimmy Baron, Rhode Island	Eric Evans, Duquesne
November 23	Jimmy Baron, Rhode Island	Andrew Nicholson, St. Bonaventure
November 30	Damian Saunders, Duquesne	Chris Wright, Dayton
November 30	Andrew Nicholson, St. Bonaventure	Chris Wright, Dayton
December 7	Ahmad Nivins, Saint Joseph's	Andrew Nicholson, St. Bonaventure
December 7	B.J. Raymond, Xavier	Andrew Nicholson, St. Bonaventure
December 14	Dionte Christmas, Temple	Jio Fontan, Fordham
December 14	Aaron Jackson, Duquesne	Jio Fontan, Fordham
December 21	Tommie Liddell, Saint Louis	Eric Evans, Duquesne
December 28	Ahmad Nivins, Saint Joseph's	Eric Evans, Duquesne
December 28	Ahmad Nivins, Saint Joseph's	Jio Fontan, Fordham
January 5	Aaron Jackson, Duquesne	Willie Reed, Saint Louis
January 11	Derrick Brown, Xavier	Andrew Nicholson, St. Bonaventure
January 11	Ahmad Nivins, Saint Joseph's	Andrew Nicholson, St. Bonaventure
January 18	Dionte Christmas, Temple	Alberto Estwick, Fordham
January 18	Dionte Christmas, Temple	Chris Johnson, Dayton
January 25	Justin Harper, Richmond	Kenny Frease, Xavier
January 25	Ahmad Nivins, Saint Joseph's	Kenny Frease, Xavier
February 1	Tasheed Carr, Saint Joseph's	Andrew Nicholson, St. Bonaventure
February 1	B.J. Raymond, Xavier	Andrew Nicholson, St. Bonaventure
February 8	Aaron Jackson, Duquesne	Andrew Nicholson, St. Bonaventure
February 15	Lamont Mack, Charlotte	Kwamain Mitchell, Saint Louis
February 22	Kevin Anderson, Richmond	Kwamain Mitchell, Saint Louis
February 22	Rob Diggs, George Washington	Kwamain Mitchell, Saint Louis
March 1	Damian Hollis, George Washington	Eric Evans, Duquesne
March 1	Aaron Jackson, Duquesne	Eric Evans, Duquesne

=== All-Conference Awards ===
- Player of the Year: Ahmad Nivins, Saint Joseph's
- Rookie of the Year: Andrew Nicholson, St. Bonaventure
- Defensive Player of the Year: Tony Gaffney, Massachusetts
- Chris Daniels Most Improved Player of the Year: Aaron Jackson, Duquesne
- Sixth Man of the Year: Delroy James, Rhode Island
- Student-Athlete of the Year: Kevin Lisch, Saint Louis
- Coach of the Year: Jim Baron, Rhode Island

==== Atlantic 10 Men's Basketball All-Conference Teams ====
First Team

- Jimmy Baron, Rhode Island
- Dionte Christmas, Temple
- Aaron Jackson, Duquesne
- Ahmad Nivins, Saint Joseph's
- B.J. Raymond, Xavier

Second Team

- Kevin Anderson, Richmond
- Derrick Brown, Xavier
- Tony Gaffney, Massachusetts
- Rodney Green, La Salle
- Chris Wright, Dayton

Third Team

- Lavoy Allen, Temple
- Ricky Harris, Massachusetts
- Kevin Lisch, Saint Louis
- Lamont Mack, Charlotte
- Kahiem Seawright, Rhode Island

Honorable Mention

- C.J. Anderson, Xavier
- David Gonzalvez, Richmond
- Marcus Johnson, Dayton
- Chris Lowe, Massachusetts
- Damian Saunders, Duquesne

Rookie Team

- Melquan Bolding, Duquesne
- Jio Fontan, Fordham
- Chris Johnson, Dayton
- Kwamain Mitchell, Saint Louis
- Andrew Nicholson, St. Bonaventure

Defensive Team

- Lavoy Allen, Temple
- Tony Gaffney, Massachusetts
- Ahmad Nivins, Saint Joseph's
- London Warren, Dayton
- Garrett Williamson, Saint Joseph's

Academic Team

- Jimmy Baron, Rhode Island
- Luke Bonner, Massachusetts
- Jason Duty, Duquesne
- Will Martell, Rhode Island
- Yves Mekongo Mbala, La Salle

== Rankings ==
2008–09 Atlantic 10 Conference Weekly Rankings Key: ██ Increase in ranking. ██ Decrease in ranking. RV = Received Votes
AP Poll	Pre	Wk 1	Wk 2	Wk 3	Wk 4	Wk 5	Wk 6	Wk 7	Wk 8	Wk 9	Wk 10	Wk 11	Wk 12	Wk 13	Wk 14	Wk 15	Wk 16	Wk 17	Wk 18
Charlotte																			
Dayton				27	26	30	30	37	41		42	36	26	31	25	31	30	33	
Duquesne																			
Fordham																			
George Washington																			
La Salle																			
Massachusetts																			
Rhode Island		42	43														40		
Richmond																			
Saint Louis																			
St. Bonaventure																			
St. Joseph's	53																		
Temple	45					43												33	35
Xavier	26	29	16	14	10	7	14	22	16	15	15	10	9	14	16	19	17	19	20

== Post Tournament Results ==
=== NCAA tournament ===
Xavier (2–1) : Regional semifinals (Sweet Sixteen)

Dayton (1-1): Regional second round

Temple (0–1): Regional first round

=== National Invitation Tournament ===
Rhode Island (1-1): Second round

Duquesne (0–1): First round

=== College Basketball Invitational ===
Richmond (2–1): Semifinal
