= 2008–09 Richmond Spiders men's basketball team =

American college basketball season

2008–09 Richmond Spiders men's basketball

CBI Semifinals vs. UTEP, L 81–69
- Conference: Atlantic 10 Conference
- Record: 20–16 (9–7 A-10)
- Head coach: Chris Mooney (4th season)
- Assistant coaches: Kevin McGeehan (4th season); Jamal Brunt (2nd season); Rob Jones (1st season)
- Home arena: Robins Center

2008–09 Atlantic 10 men's basketball standings
	Conf.				Overall
Team	W		L	PCT	W		L	PCT
No. 20 Xavier	12	–	4	.750	27	–	8	.771
Dayton	11	–	5	.688	27	–	8	.771
Rhode Island	11	–	5	.688	23	–	11	.676
Temple†	11	–	5	.688	22	–	12	.647
Duquesne	9	–	7	.563	21	–	13	.618
La Salle	9	–	7	.563	18	–	13	.581
Richmond	9	–	7	.563	20	–	16	.556
Saint Joseph's	9	–	7	.563	17	–	15	.531
Saint Louis	8	–	8	.500	18	–	14	.563
UMass	7	–	9	.438	12	–	18	.400
St. Bonaventure	6	–	10	.375	15	–	15	.500
Charlotte	5	–	11	.313	11	–	20	.355
George Washington	4	–	12	.250	10	–	18	.357
Fordham	1	–	15	.063	3	–	25	.107
† 2009 Atlantic 10 Tournament winner Rankings from AP Poll

The 2008–09 Richmond Spiders men's basketball team represented the University of Richmond in National Collegiate Athletic Association (NCAA) Division I college basketball during the 2008–09 season. Richmond competed as a member of the Atlantic 10 Conference (A-10) under fourth-year head basketball coach Chris Mooney and played its home games at the Robins Center.

== Roster ==
2008–09 Richmond Spiders men's basketball team
Players
Coaches

Pos.	#	Name	Height	Weight	Year	Hometown
F	1	Darrius Garrett	6 ft 9 in (2.06 m)	200 lb (91 kg)	Fr	Raleigh, North Carolina
G	3	Mark McGonigal	6 ft 0 in (1.83 m)	195 lb (88 kg)	Sr	Absecon, New Jersey
C	4	Jarhon Giddings	6 ft 9 in (2.06 m)	225 lb (102 kg)	Sr	Winston-Salem, North Carolina
G	5	David Gonzalvez	6 ft 4 in (1.93 m)	205 lb (93 kg)	Jr	Marietta, Georgia
G	10	Duncan McLean	6 ft 1 in (1.85 m)	185 lb (84 kg)	Sr	Wilmette, Illinois
F/C	11	Josh Duinker	6 ft 11 in (2.11 m)	220 lb (100 kg)	RS Fr	Sydney, Australia
F	12	Kevin Smith	6 ft 5 in (1.96 m)	190 lb (86 kg)	So	Murfreesboro, Tennessee
G/F	13	Zak Estes	6 ft 4 in (1.93 m)	185 lb (84 kg)	Fr	Indianapolis, Indiana
G	14	Kevin Anderson	6 ft 0 in (1.83 m)	170 lb (77 kg)	So	Atlanta, Georgia
F	15	Francis-Cedric Martel	6 ft 6 in (1.98 m)	200 lb (91 kg)	Fr	Montreal, Canada
G/F	21	Kevin Hovde	6 ft 6 in (1.98 m)	200 lb (91 kg)	Jr	Kennett Square, Pennsylvania
G	24	Liam Billings	6 ft 4 in (1.93 m)	185 lb (84 kg)	Fr	Winter Park, Florida
F	31	Conor Smith	6 ft 9 in (2.06 m)	210 lb (95 kg)	RS Fr	Brookfield, Wisconsin
F	32	Justin Harper	6 ft 10 in (2.08 m)	215 lb (98 kg)	So	Richmond, Virginia
C	41	Dan Geriot (injured)	6 ft 9 in (2.06 m)	235 lb (107 kg)	Jr	Springfield, Pennsylvania
G	44	Ryan Butler	6 ft 7 in (2.01 m)	200 lb (91 kg)	RS Jr	Richmond, Virginia

Head coach

- Chris Mooney (Princeton)

Assistant coach(es)

- Kevin McGeehan (Gettysburg)
- Jamal Brunt (Randolph-Macon)
- Rob Jones (Toccoa Falls)

Legend

- (C) Team captain
- (S) Suspended
- (I) Ineligible
- (W) Walk-on
- Injured
- Current redshirt

== Schedule ==
Date time, TV	Rank^{#}	Opponent^{#}	Result	Record	Site (attendance) city, state
European Summer Trip
August 14*; 2:00 pm		at USA Toulogues Perpignan	W 101–78	–	(–); Perpignan, France
August 18*; 3:00 pm		at Caja Rioja	L 94–95 ^{OT}	–	(–); Logroño, Spain
August 19*; 3:00 pm		at Ford Burgos	L 79–103	–	(–); Burgos, Spain
August 20*; 3:00 pm		at Illescas Toledo	W 91–77	–	(–); Illescas, Spain
Regular Season
November 15*; 8:00 pm		Randolph–Macon	W 81–57	1–0	Robins Center (5,415); Richmond, Virginia
November 18*; 6:00 pm, ESPN		at Syracuse; CBE Classic	L 71–76	1–1	Carrier Dome (16,260); Syracuse, New York
November 24*; 7:00 pm		at Florida Gulf Coast; CBE Classic	W 69–58	2–1	Alico Arena (1,478); Ft. Myers, Florida
November 25*; 5:00 pm		vs. UMKC; CBE Classic	W 85–74	3–1	Alico Arena (742); Ft. Myers, Florida
November 26*; 5:00 pm		vs. Bradley; CBE Classic	L 66–80	3–2	Alico Arena (1,069); Ft. Myers, Florida
November 30*; 7:00 pm		Coppin State	W 78–67	4–2	Robins Center (3,064); Richmond, Virginia
December 3*; 7:00 pm, Comcast SportsNet		at Old Dominion	L 62–65	4–3	Ted Constant Convocation Center (6,242); Norfolk, Virginia
December 6*; 7:00 pm		Delaware State	W 76–66	5–3	Robins Center (3,138); Richmond, Virginia
December 13*; 2:00 pm, ESPNU		Virginia Commonwealth; Farm Bureau Insurance Black & Blue Classic	L 76–77	5–4	Robins Center (7,182); Richmond, Virginia
December 19*; 7:00 pm, ESPNU		No. 10 Wake Forest	L 79–86	5–5	Robins Center (6,635); Richmond, Virginia
December 22*; 7:00 pm		Bucknell	W 79–57	6–5	Robins Center (4,146); Richmond, Virginia
December 28*; 5:30 pm, MASN		at UNC Wilmington	W 76–69	7–5	Trask Coliseum (3,430); Wilmington, North Carolina
December 31*; 7:00 pm, MASN		at Virginia Military Institute	L 70–73	7–6	Cameron Hall (3,109); Lexington, Virginia
January 3*; 12:00 pm		Rice	W 74–43	8–6	Robins Center (4,178); Richmond, Virginia
January 10; 2:00 pm, MASN		at George Washington	W 60–48	9–6 (1–0)	Smith Center (2,770); Washington, D.C.
January 14*; 7:00 pm		at Virginia Tech	L 48–62	9–7	Cassell Coliseum (9,847); Blacksburg, Virginia
January 17; 7:00 pm		St. Bonaventure	L 67–71	9–8 (1–1)	Robins Center (5,751); Richmond, Virginia
January 21; 7:00 pm		Rhode Island	W 78–75	10–8 (2–1)	Robins Center (3,538); Richmond, Virginia
January 25; 3:00 pm		at Saint Louis	W 70–62	11–8 (3–1)	Chaifetz Arena (8,946); St. Louis, Missouri
January 28; 7:00 pm		Saint Joseph's	L 58–68	11–9 (3–2)	Robins Center (4,312); Richmond, Virginia
January 31; 6:30 pm, CBS College Sports		at Temple	L 65–74	11–10 (3–3)	Liacouras Center (6,087); Philadelphia, Pennsylvania
February 4; 7:00 pm		at Massachusetts	L 71–80	11–11 (3–4)	Mullins Center (3,439); Amherst, Massachusetts
February 8; 2:00 pm, KPLR-TV		Saint Louis	L 72–85 ^{3OT}	11–12 (3–5)	Robins Center (5,242); Richmond, Virginia
February 11; 7:00 pm		Duquesne	W 71–67	12–12 (4–5)	Robins Center (4,334); Richmond, Virginia
February 14; 7:00 pm, MASN		at Dayton	L 63–69	12–13 (4–6)	University of Dayton Arena (13,435); Dayton, Ohio
February 18; 7:00 pm		at La Salle	W 62–53	13–13 (5–6)	Tom Gola Arena (1,475); Philadelphia, Pennsylvania
February 21; 6:00 pm, CBS College Sports		Charlotte	W 65–58	14–13 (6–6)	Robins Center (7,059); Richmond, Virginia
February 25; 7:00 pm		at Fordham	W 78–68	15–13 (7–6)	Rose Hill Gym (1,840); Bronx, New York
February 28; 7:00 pm		George Washington	L 57–66	15–14 (7–7)	Robins Center (5,338); Richmond, Virginia
March 3; 7:00 pm, CBS College Sports		at Charlotte	W 64–62	16–14 (8–7)	Halton Arena (5,219); Charlotte, North Carolina
March 7; 7:00 pm, MASN/Fox Sports Ohio		No. 17 Xavier	W 80–75	17–14 (9–7)	Robins Center (5,653); Richmond, Virginia
2009 Atlantic 10 men's basketball tournament
March 11; 9:00 pm		vs. St. Bonaventure; First Round	W 65–49	18–14	Boardwalk Hall (3,418); Atlantic City, New Jersey
March 12; 9:00 pm		vs. Dayton; Quarterfinal	L 64–69	18–15	Boardwalk Hall (4,333); Atlantic City, New Jersey
2009 College Basketball Invitational
March 18*; 7:00 pm		St. John's; First Round	W 75–69	19–15	Robins Center (2,171); Richmond, Virginia
March 23*; 7:00 pm		Charleston; Quarterfinal	W 74–72	20–15	Robins Center (2,541); Richmond, Virginia
March 25*; 8:00 pm		UTEP; Semifinal	L 69–81	20–16	Robins Center (2,363); Richmond, Virginia
*Non-conference game. ^{#}Rankings from AP Poll. (#) Tournament seedings in parentheses. All times are in Eastern Time.
