= 2008–09 Saint Louis Billikens men's basketball team =

American college basketball season

2008–09 Saint Louis Billikens men's basketball
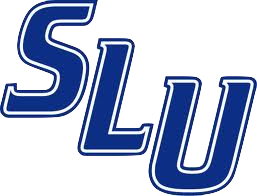
- Conference: Atlantic 10 Conference
- Record: 18–14 (8–8 A-10)
- Head coach: Rick Majerus
- Home arena: Chaifetz Arena

2008–09 Atlantic 10 men's basketball standings
	Conf.				Overall
Team	W		L	PCT	W		L	PCT
No. 20 Xavier	12	–	4	.750	27	–	8	.771
Dayton	11	–	5	.688	27	–	8	.771
Rhode Island	11	–	5	.688	23	–	11	.676
Temple†	11	–	5	.688	22	–	12	.647
Duquesne	9	–	7	.563	21	–	13	.618
La Salle	9	–	7	.563	18	–	13	.581
Richmond	9	–	7	.563	20	–	16	.556
Saint Joseph's	9	–	7	.563	17	–	15	.531
Saint Louis	8	–	8	.500	18	–	14	.563
UMass	7	–	9	.438	12	–	18	.400
St. Bonaventure	6	–	10	.375	15	–	15	.500
Charlotte	5	–	11	.313	11	–	20	.355
George Washington	4	–	12	.250	10	–	18	.357
Fordham	1	–	15	.063	3	–	25	.107
† 2009 Atlantic 10 Tournament winner Rankings from AP Poll

The 2008–09 Saint Louis Billikens men's basketball team represented Saint Louis University in the 2008–09 college basketball season. This was head coach Rick Majerus's second season at Saint Louis. The Billikens competed in the Atlantic 10 Conference. It was also the Billikens first season in which they played their home games at Chaifetz Arena. They finished the season 18–14 and 8–8 in A-10 play.

== Roster ==
NO	Name	Position	Height	Weight	Year	Hometown (Last School)
3	Kwamain Mitchell	Guard	5-10	165	FR	Milwaukee, WI (Dominican)
10	Paul Eckerle	Guard	6-1	185	SO	Washington, Mo. (St. Francis Borgia)
12	Femi John	Guard	6-2	190	FR	St. Louis, MO (McCluer North)
14	Brian Conklin	Forward	6-6	220	FR	North Eugene, Ore. (North Eugene)
15	Barry Eberhardt	Forward	6-6	250	SR	Inkster, Mich. (Coffeyville CC
20	Daniel Lisch	Guard	6-2	185	FR	Belleville, Ill. (West)
21	Kevin Lisch	Guard	6-2	190	SR	Belleville, Ill. (Althoff)
22	Jonathan Parker	Guard	6-3	180	FR	Milwaukee Wis. (Marquette U. High)
23	Kyle Cassity	Guard	6-3	185	FR	Pinckneyville, Ill. (Pinckneyville)
25	Tommie Liddell	Guard	6-4	195	SR	East St. Louis, Ill. (Hargrave Military Academy)
33	Willie Reed	Forward	6-9	195	FR	Kansas City, Mo. (Bishop Miege)
41	Brett Thompson	Center	6-10	260	FR	Vienna, Ill. (Vienna)
44	Andre Craig	Guard	6-3	175	FR	St. Louis, Mo. (SLUH)
