= 2008–09 UMass Minutemen basketball team =

American college basketball season

2008–09 UMass Minutemen men's basketball
- Conference: Atlantic 10 Conference
- Record: 12–18 (7–9 A-10)
- Head coach: Derek Kellogg (1st season)
- Assistant coaches: Adam Ginsburg; Antwon Jackson; Vance Walberg
- Home arena: William D. Mullins Memorial Center

2008–09 Atlantic 10 men's basketball standings
	Conf.				Overall
Team	W		L	PCT	W		L	PCT
No. 20 Xavier	12	–	4	.750	27	–	8	.771
Dayton	11	–	5	.688	27	–	8	.771
Rhode Island	11	–	5	.688	23	–	11	.676
Temple†	11	–	5	.688	22	–	12	.647
Duquesne	9	–	7	.563	21	–	13	.618
La Salle	9	–	7	.563	18	–	13	.581
Richmond	9	–	7	.563	20	–	16	.556
Saint Joseph's	9	–	7	.563	17	–	15	.531
Saint Louis	8	–	8	.500	18	–	14	.563
UMass	7	–	9	.438	12	–	18	.400
St. Bonaventure	6	–	10	.375	15	–	15	.500
Charlotte	5	–	11	.313	11	–	20	.355
George Washington	4	–	12	.250	10	–	18	.357
Fordham	1	–	15	.063	3	–	25	.107
† 2009 Atlantic 10 Tournament winner Rankings from AP Poll

The 2008–09 UMass Minutemen basketball team represented the University of Massachusetts Amherst during the 2008–09 NCAA Division I men's basketball season. The Minutemen, led by first year head coach Derek Kellogg, played their home games at William D. Mullins Memorial Center and are members of the Atlantic 10 Conference. They finished the season 12–18, 7–9 in A-10 play to finish for tenth place. UMass lost in the first round of the Atlantic 10 tournament to Duquesne.

== Roster ==
Number	Name	Position	Height	Weight	Year	Hometown
2	David Gibbs	Guard	6–4	185	Freshman	East Hartford, Connecticut
3	Doug Wiggins	Guard	6–1	160	Junior	East Hartford, Connecticut
4	Lex Mongo	Guard	5–11	180	Junior	Boston, Massachusetts
5	Ricky Harris	Guard	6–2	175	Junior	Baltimore, Maryland
11	Gary Correia	Guard	6–1	180	Sophomore	Providence, Rhode Island
12	Anthony Gurley	Guard	6–3	185	RS Sophomore	Boston, Massachusetts
14	Chris Lowe	Guard	6–0	160	Senior	Mount Vernon, New York
23	Sean Carter	Forward/Center	6–9	225	Sophomore	Fayetteville, North Carolina
24	Tony Gaffney	Forward	6–8	208	RS Senior	Berkley, Massachusetts
25	Tyrell Lynch	Forward/Center	6–9	230	Freshman	Niagara Falls, New York
31	Luke Bonner	Center	7-1	245	RS Senior	Concord, New Hampshire
33	Matt Glass	Guard	6–7	190	Sophomore	Underhill Center, Vermont
35	Hashim Bailey	Forward/Center	6–10	275	Junior	Paterson, New Jersey
50	Matt Hill	Forward	6–7	210	Sophomore	Middletown, Connecticut

== Schedule ==
Date time, TV	Rank^{#}	Opponent^{#}	Result	Record	Site (attendance) city, state
Exhibition
11/05/2008*; 7:00 pm		Dowling	W 91-87		Mullins Center (2,352); Amherst, MA
Regular Season
11/11/2008*; 5:00 pm		vs. Arkansas Monticello; 2K Sports Classic	W 90-71	1–0	SIU Arena (6,889); Carbondale, Illinois
11/12/2008*; 7:00 pm		at Southern Illinois; 2K Sports Classic	L 73–80	1–1	SIU Arena (5,571); Carbondale, IL
11/17/2010*; 12:00 am, ESPN		at No. 12 Memphis	L 58–80	1–2	FedEx Forum (18,254); Memphis, Tennessee
11/24/2008*; 7:00 pm		Jacksonville State	L 74-75	1–3	Mullins Center (4,821); Amherst, MA
11/29/2008*; 7:00 pm, WACY		at Wisconsin Green Bay	L 67–84	1–4	Kress Events Center (4,086); Green Bay, Wisconsin
12/03/2008*; 7:00 pm, BCSN		at Toledo	L 56-57	1-5	Savage Arena (7,252); Toledo, Ohio
12/6/2008*; 7:00 pm, CBSCS		Boston College	L 81–85 ^{OT}	1–6	Mullins Center (6,792); Amherst, MA
12/10/2008*; 7:00 pm		Holy Cross	W 73–59	2–6	Mullins Center (4,102); Amherst, MA
12/13/2008*; 1:00 pm, ESPN		at No. 25 Kansas	W 61-60	3-6	Sprint Center (17,252); Kansas City, Missouri
12/20/2008*; 4:00 pm		Hofstra	W 97-81	4-6	Mullins Center (3,475); Amherst, MA
12/27/2008*; 4:00 pm		IUPUI	W 64-57	5-6	Mullins Center (4,876); Amherst, MA
12/30/2008*; 1:00 pm		at Houston	L 54-80	5-7	Hofheinz Pavilion (3,623); Houston, Texas
1/3/2009*; 5:00 pm, CBSCS		Vanderbilt	L 48-78	5-8	Mullins Center (5,698); Amherst, MA
1/10/2009; 7:30 pm, WSHM		Dayton	W 75-62	6-8 (1-0)	MassMutual Center (5,485); Springfield, Massachusetts
01/14/2009; 7:00 pm		at St. Louis	L 64-69	6-9 (1–1)	Chaifetz Arena (7,632); St. Louis, Missouri
01/17/2009; 7:00 pm, ESPN2		Temple	W 79-75	7-9 (2–1)	Mullins Center (7,182); Amherst, MA
01/21/2009; 7:30 pm		at Charlotte	L 64-69 ^{OT}	7-10 (2–2)	Dale F. Halton Arena (5,497); Charlotte, North Carolina
01/24/2009; 4:00 pm		La Salle	L 54-62	7–11 (2-3)	Mullins Center (5,622); Amherst, MA
01/31/2009; 12:00 pm, ESPNU		at No. 10 Xavier	L 80-82	7–12 (2–4)	Cintas Center (10,250); Cincinnati, Ohio
02/04/2009; 7:00 pm		Richmond	W 80-71	8-12 (3-4)	Mullins Center (3,439); Amherst, MA
2/08/2009; 3:00 pm, CBSCS		St. Joseph's	L 64-68	8-13 (3–5)	Mullins Center (5,982); Amherst, MA
02/11/2009; 7:00 pm		at Fordham	W 91-68	9-13 (4-5)	Rose Hill Gymnasium (1,935); Bronx, New York
02/14/2009; 7:00 pm		at St. Bonaventure	L 75-83	9-14 (4-6)	Reilly Center (5,011); Olean, New York
02/18/2009; 7:00 pm		Rhode Island	L 59-71	9-15 (4-7)	Mullins Center (6,139); Amherst, MA
02/22/2009; 2:00 pm		at St. Joseph's	W 70-69	10-15 (5-7)	The Palestra (6,522); Philadelphia, Pennsylvania
02/25/2009; 7:00 pm		Duquesne	L 77-94	10-16 (5-8)	Mullins Center (3,321); Amherst, MA
03/01/2009; 4:00 pm, CBSCS		at La Salle	L 88-97	10–17 (5-9)	Tom Gola Arena (2,610); Philadelphia, Pennsylvania
03/04/2009; 7:00 pm		George Washington	W 77-62	11-17 (6-9)	Mullins Center (3,982); Amherst, MA
2009 Atlantic 10 men's basketball tournament
03/11/2009; 6:30 pm		vs. Duquesne; 1st Round	L 81-91	12-18	Boardwalk Hall (?); Atlantic City, New Jersey
*Non-conference game. ^{#}Rankings from AP Poll. (#) Tournament seedings in parentheses. All times are in Eastern Time.
