= 2008–09 Temple Owls men's basketball team =

American college basketball season

2008–09 Temple Owls men's basketball

A-10 Tournament Champions

NCAA tournament, first round
- Conference: Atlantic 10 Conference
- Record: 22–12 (11–5 A-10)
- Head coach: Fran Dunphy
- Assistant coaches: Dave Duke; Matt Langel; Shawn Trice
- Home arena: Liacouras Center

2008–09 Atlantic 10 men's basketball standings
	Conf.				Overall
Team	W		L	PCT	W		L	PCT
No. 20 Xavier	12	–	4	.750	27	–	8	.771
Dayton	11	–	5	.688	27	–	8	.771
Rhode Island	11	–	5	.688	23	–	11	.676
Temple†	11	–	5	.688	22	–	12	.647
Duquesne	9	–	7	.563	21	–	13	.618
La Salle	9	–	7	.563	18	–	13	.581
Richmond	9	–	7	.563	20	–	16	.556
Saint Joseph's	9	–	7	.563	17	–	15	.531
Saint Louis	8	–	8	.500	18	–	14	.563
UMass	7	–	9	.438	12	–	18	.400
St. Bonaventure	6	–	10	.375	15	–	15	.500
Charlotte	5	–	11	.313	11	–	20	.355
George Washington	4	–	12	.250	10	–	18	.357
Fordham	1	–	15	.063	3	–	25	.107
† 2009 Atlantic 10 Tournament winner Rankings from AP Poll

The 2008–09 Temple Owls men's basketball team represented Temple University in the 2008–09 NCAA Division I men's basketball season. They were led by head coach Fran Dunphy and played their home games at the Liacouras Center. The Owls are members of the Atlantic 10 Conference. They finished the season 22–12 and 11–5 in A-10 play. They won the 2009 Atlantic 10 men's basketball tournament for the second consecutive year to receive the conference's automatic bid to the 2009 NCAA Division I men's basketball tournament.

Dionte Christmas led Temple in three statistics: points per game (19.5), three-pointers completed (107), and total steals (51); he finished second in two more: rebounds per game (5.5) and assists (28). In addition, he was an honorable mention All-American and scored 2,000 points over his college basketball career. Also graduating were two other starters: 7–0 center Sergio Olmos, who was selected as an All-A10 Tournament player, and point guard Semaj Inge.

== Preseason ==
On October 28, 2008, the Owls were picked by other Atlantic 10 coaches to finish second, behind Xavier, and received 12 first place votes. Dionte Christmas was chosen to the Preseason First Team after leading the league in scoring the past two seasons. Lavoy Allen was named to the Preseason Defensive Team.

== Roster ==
#	Name	Height	Weight (lbs.)	Position	Class	Hometown		High school
2	Ryan Brooks	6 ft 4 in (1.93 m)	200 pounds (91 kg)	G	Jr.	Narberth, Pennsylvania	U.S.	Lower Merion HS
4	Juan Fernandez	6 ft 4 in (1.93 m)	180 pounds (82 kg)	G	Fr.	Río Tercero, Córdoba	Argentina	Dr. Alexis Carrel HS
10	Luis Guzman	6 ft 3 in (1.91 m)	200 pounds (91 kg)	G	Jr.	New York City, New York	U.S.	Paramus Catholic HS
11	T. J. DiLeo	6 ft 2 in (1.88 m)	195 pounds (88 kg)	G	Fr.	Cinnaminson, New Jersey	U.S.	Cinnaminson HS
15	Semaj Inge	6 ft 4 in (1.93 m)	190 pounds (86 kg)	G	Sr.	Camden, New Jersey	U.S.	Woodrow Wilson HS
21	Rafael DeLeon	6 ft 5 in (1.96 m)	200 pounds (91 kg)	F	Jr.	District Heights, Maryland	U.S.	Bishop McNamara HS
22	Dionte Christmas	6 ft 5 in (1.96 m)	205 pounds (93 kg)	G	Sr.	Philadelphia, Pennsylvania	U.S.	Lutheran Christian Academy
23	Ramone Moore	6 ft 4 in (1.93 m)	180 pounds (82 kg)	G	Fr.	Philadelphia, Pennsylvania	U.S.	South Philadelphia HS
24	Lavoy Allen	6 ft 9 in (2.06 m)	225 pounds (102 kg)	F	So.	Morrisville, Pennsylvania	U.S.	Pennsbury HS
30	Craig Williams	6 ft 9 in (2.06 m)	240 pounds (110 kg)	F	So.	Christiansted, U.S. Virgin Islands	U.S.	St. Croix Central HS
33	Scootie Randall	6 ft 6 in (1.98 m)	205 pounds (93 kg)	F	Fr.	Philadelphia, Pennsylvania	U.S.	Communications Tech HS
41	Sergio Olmos	7 ft 0 in (2.13 m)	220 pounds (100 kg)	C	Sr.	Valencia	Spain	Vincente Blasco Ibanez HS
50	Micheal Eric	6 ft 11 in (2.11 m)	240 pounds (110 kg)	F/C	Fr.	Lagos	Nigeria	Church Farm School

== Schedule ==
2008–09 game log
November

Game	Date	Team	Score	High points	High rebounds	High assists	Location Attendance	Record
1	November 14	East Tennessee State	W 79–65	Dionte Christmas – 26	Lavoy Allen – 15	Christmas/Semaj Inge – 6	Carolina First Arena, Charleston, SC (527)	1–0
2	November 15	College of Charleston	W 70–65	Christmas – 26	Allen – 12	Luis Guzman – 5	Carolina First Arena, Charleston, SC (2,532)	2–0
3	November 16	Clemson	L 76–72	Ryan Brooks – 19	Guzman – 7	Guzman – 7	Carolina First Arena, Charleston, SC (3,026)	2–1
4	November 21	Lafayette	W 71–55	Christmas – 29	Christmas – 12	Christmas/Guzman – 3	Allan P. Kirby Arena, Easton, PA (3,297)	3–1
5	November 29	Buffalo	L 83–73	Christmas – 25	Christmas – 6	Guzman – 7	Alumni Arena, Buffalo, NY (2,035)	3–2

December

Game	Date	Team	Score	High points	High rebounds	High assists	Location Attendance	Record
6	December 3	Miami (OH)	L 68–52	Sergio Olmos – 12	Brooks – 6	Inge – 5	Liacouras Center, Philadelphia, PA (5,029)	3–3
7	December 6	Penn State	W 65–59	Inge – 19	Allen – 10	Inge – 6	Bryce Jordan Center, State College, PA (9,833)	4–3
8	December 13	#8 Tennessee	W 88–72	Christmas – 35	Brooks – 10	Inge – 4	Liacouras Center, Philadelphia, PA (8,068)	5–3
9	December 20	Kansas	L 71–59	Christmas – 21	Allen – 7	Allen – 5	Phog Allen Fieldhouse, Lawrence, KS (16,300)	5–4
10	December 22	Long Beach State	L 76–71	Christmas – 19	Allen – 11	Allen – 5	Walter Pyramid, Long Beach, CA (2,042)	5–5
11	December 29	#13 Villanova	L 62–45	Christmas – 13	Christmas/Olmos – 5	Christmas – 4	The Pavilion, Villanova, PA (6,500)	5–6

January

Game	Date	Team	Score	High points	High rebounds	High assists	Location Attendance	Record
12	January 5	Kent State	W 73–58	Christmas – 26	Allen – 10	Brooks/Juan Fernandez – 4	Liacouras Center, Philadelphia, PA (3,508)	6–6
13	January 7	Eastern Michigan	W 67–45	Christmas – 17	Allen – 5	Allen/Christmas – 3	Convocation Center, Ypsilanti, MI (493)	7–6
14	January 11	La Salle	W 75–68	Christmas – 30	Allen/Inge – 6	Inge – 6	Tom Gola Arena, Philadelphia, PA (3,510)	8–6 (1–0)
15	January 14	Pennsylvania	W 78–53	Christmas – 25	Christmas – 9	Inge/Fernandez – 5	The Palestra, Philadelphia, PA (4,261)	9–6
16	January 17	UMass	L 79–75	Christmas – 26	Christmas – 9	Allen – 5	William D. Mullins Center, Amherst, MA (7,182)	9–7 (1–1)
17	January 22	Saint Louis	W 65–40	Allen – 16	Allen/Christmas – 7	Christmas – 5	Liacouras Center, Philadelphia, PA (4,856)	10–7 (2–1)
18	January 24	Charlotte	W 80–53	Inge – 19	Allen – 10	Fernandez – 4	Liacouras Center, Philadelphia, PA (5,747)	11–7 (3–1)
19	January 28	Rhode Island	L 67–59	Christmas – 27	Micheal Eric – 7	Guzman – 3	Thomas M. Ryan Center, Kingston, RI (5,028)	11–8 (3–2)
20	January 31	Richmond	W 74–65	Inge – 19	Christmas – 13	Christmas – 3	Liacouras Center, Philadelphia, PA (6,087)	12–8 (4–2)

February

Game	Date	Team	Score	High points	High rebounds	High assists	Location Attendance	Record
21	February 5	#9 Xavier	L 83–74	Olmos – 18	Allen – 14	Christmas – 8	Cintas Center, Cincinnati, OH (10,250)	12–9 (4–3)
22	February 8	Rhode Island	W 68–62	Allen – 23	Allen – 13	Inge – 7	Liacouras Center, Philadelphia, PA (5,654)	13–9 (5–3)
23	February 12	Saint Joseph's	W 61–59	Christmas – 19	Christmas – 11	Christmas/Inge – 4	The Palestra, Philadelphia, PA (8,722)	14–9 (6–3)
24	February 15	Duquesne	W 78–73	Fernandez – 19	Craig Williams – 6	Christmas – 4	A.J. Palumbo Center, Pittsburgh, PA (4,029)	15–9 (7–3)
25	February 18	Fordham	W 72–45	Allen – 19	Allen – 11	Fernandez – 4	Liacouras Center, Philadelphia, PA (3,837)	16–9 (8–3)
26	February 22	St. Bonaventure	W 70–56	Allen – 20	Allen – 18	Allen – 4	Liacouras Center, Philadelphia, PA (7,092)	17–9 (9–3)
27	February 26	La Salle	L 70–63	Christmas – 19	Allen – 12	Fernandez – 6	Liacouras Center, Philadelphia, PA (6,031)	17–10 (9–4)
28	February 28	Dayton	L 70–65	Christmas/Brooks – 20	Allen – 11	Guzman – 4	University of Dayton Arena, Dayton, OH (13,435)	17–11 (9–5)

March

Game	Date	Team	Score	High points	High rebounds	High assists	Location Attendance	Record
29	March 5	Saint Joseph's	W 68–59	Christmas – 23	Williams – 9	Fernandez – 5	Liacouras Center, Philadelphia, PA (9,349)	18–11 (10–5)
30	March 7	George Washington	W 63–53	Allen – 17	Allen – 16	Inge – 5	Charles E. Smith Center, Washington, DC (2,828)	19–11 (11–5)
31	March 12	Saint Joseph's	W 79–65	Brooks – 19	Allen – 13	Inge/Christmas – 4	Boardwalk Hall, Atlantic City, NJ (4,837)	20–11
32	March 13	#19 Xavier	W 55–53	Christmas – 20	Allen – 11	Christmas – 3	Boardwalk Hall, Atlantic City, NJ	21–11
33	March 14	Duquesne	W 69–64	Christmas – 29	Allen – 14	Inge – 8	Boardwalk Hall, Atlantic City, NJ (6,823)	22–11
34	March 20	Arizona State	L 66–57	Christmas – 29	Allen – 10	Allen/Inge – 4	AmericanAirlines Arena, Miami, FL (10,163)	22–12

2015–16 season schedule

== Season ==
=== Preconference season ===
Dionte Christmas scored 35 points to lead Temple past #8 Tennessee on December 13 88–72. This was Temple's first win over a top ten team since the 2006 Atlantic 10 men's basketball tournament, when the Owls upset #6 George Washington; John Chaney was coaching Temple at the time. The Owls started the game with an 8–0 lead and never faltered, with Tennessee only tying the score at 15 and never leading. Christmas started the second half with a three-pointer and scored three consecutive threes on a 17–6 run. For the game, he was 7-for-14 from the perimeter and 12-for-22 from the field. Sergio Olmos's 19 points were a career high, and Ryan Brooks registered a double-double of 16 points and 12 rebounds.

=== Postseason ===
Temple was given a four seed in the 2009 Atlantic 10 men's basketball tournament; they received a bye and faced Saint Joseph's in the quarterfinals.

In the 2009 NCAA Division I men's basketball tournament, Temple was seeded eleventh in the South Regional, where they faced the sixth-seeded Arizona State Sun Devils in the first round. On March 20, 2009, behind a then career-high 22 points by Sun Devil Derek Glasser, Arizona State eliminated Temple 66–57. The Owls never had a lead, but cut the deficit to 52–49, the closest the game ever got. Temple's offense went without a field goal in the final 5:02. However, their defense held Arizona State star James Harden to nine points, less than half his season average, and 1-of-8 shooting. Dionte Christmas played all 40 minutes, shot 5-for-11 from behind the arc and scored 29 points in his final collegiate game.
