= 2009 Atlantic 10 men's basketball tournament =

American men's postseason college basketball tournament

- Classification: Division I
- Season: 2008–09
- Teams: 12
- Site: Boardwalk Hall; Atlantic City, New Jersey
- Champions: Temple Owls (8th title)
- Winning coach: Fran Dunphy (2nd title)
- MVP: Dionte Christmas (Temple)

2008–09 Atlantic 10 men's basketball standings
	Conf.				Overall
Team	W		L	PCT	W		L	PCT
No. 20 Xavier	12	–	4	.750	27	–	8	.771
Dayton	11	–	5	.688	27	–	8	.771
Rhode Island	11	–	5	.688	23	–	11	.676
Temple†	11	–	5	.688	22	–	12	.647
Duquesne	9	–	7	.563	21	–	13	.618
La Salle	9	–	7	.563	18	–	13	.581
Richmond	9	–	7	.563	20	–	16	.556
Saint Joseph's	9	–	7	.563	17	–	15	.531
Saint Louis	8	–	8	.500	18	–	14	.563
UMass	7	–	9	.438	12	–	18	.400
St. Bonaventure	6	–	10	.375	15	–	15	.500
Charlotte	5	–	11	.313	11	–	20	.355
George Washington	4	–	12	.250	10	–	18	.357
Fordham	1	–	15	.063	3	–	25	.107
† 2009 Atlantic 10 Tournament winner Rankings from AP Poll

The 2009 Atlantic 10 men's basketball tournament was played at Boardwalk Hall in Atlantic City, New Jersey from March 11 through March 14, 2009. The winner of the tournament received an automatic bid to the 2009 NCAA Men's Division I Basketball Tournament and was crowned Atlantic 10 Conference champion.

Temple won the tournament with a 69–64 victory over Duquesne.

== Bracket ==
First round March 11
8	La Salle	60
9	Saint Louis	62*
5	Saint Joseph's	72
12	Charlotte	62
6	Richmond	65
11	St. Bonaventure	49
7	Duquesne	91
10	Massachusetts	81

Second round March 12
1	#19 Xavier	66
9	Saint Louis	47
4	Temple	79
5	Saint Joseph's	65
3	Dayton	69
6	Richmond	64
2	Rhode Island	74
7	Duquesne	78

Semifinals; March 13
1	#19 Xavier	53
4	Temple	55
3	Dayton	66
7	Duquesne	77

Championship Game; March 14
4	Temple	69
7	Duquesne	64

Asterisk denotes game ended in overtime.
