= 2008–09 Dayton Flyers men's basketball team =

American college basketball season

2008–09 Dayton Flyers men's basketball
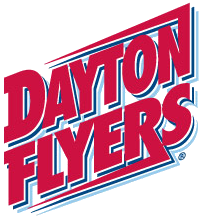

NCAA tournament, second round
- Conference: Atlantic 10 Conference
- Record: 27–8 (11–5 A-10)
- Head coach: Brian Gregory (6th season)
- Assistant coaches: Billy Schmidt; Jon Borovich; Cornell Mann
- Home arena: University of Dayton Arena

2008–09 Atlantic 10 men's basketball standings
	Conf.				Overall
Team	W		L	PCT	W		L	PCT
No. 20 Xavier	12	–	4	.750	27	–	8	.771
Dayton	11	–	5	.688	27	–	8	.771
Rhode Island	11	–	5	.688	23	–	11	.676
Temple†	11	–	5	.688	22	–	12	.647
Duquesne	9	–	7	.563	21	–	13	.618
La Salle	9	–	7	.563	18	–	13	.581
Richmond	9	–	7	.563	20	–	16	.556
Saint Joseph's	9	–	7	.563	17	–	15	.531
Saint Louis	8	–	8	.500	18	–	14	.563
UMass	7	–	9	.438	12	–	18	.400
St. Bonaventure	6	–	10	.375	15	–	15	.500
Charlotte	5	–	11	.313	11	–	20	.355
George Washington	4	–	12	.250	10	–	18	.357
Fordham	1	–	15	.063	3	–	25	.107
† 2009 Atlantic 10 Tournament winner Rankings from AP Poll

The 2008–09 Dayton Flyers men's basketball team represented the University of Dayton during the 2008–09 NCAA Division I men's basketball season. The Flyers, led by sixth year head coach Brian Gregory, played their home games at the University of Dayton Arena and were members of the Atlantic 10 Conference. They finished the season 27–8, 11–5 in A-10 play for a tie for second-place. They received an at-large bid to the NCAA tournament where they defeated West Virginia in the round of 64 before losing in the round of 32 to defending national champion Kansas. The Flyers first round win was the program's first in the NCAA Tournament since 1990, when they defeated Illinois in the round of 64.

== Previous season ==
The 2007–08 Dayton Flyers finished the season with an overall record of 23–11, with a record of 8–8 in the Atlantic 10 regular season for a tie for a fifth-place finish. They received an at-large bid to the 2008 National Invitation Tournament where they beat Cleveland State and Illinois State in the first and second rounds before falling to eventual champion Ohio State in the quarterfinals.

== Offseason ==
=== Departures ===
Name	Number	Pos.	Height	Weight	Year	Hometown	Notes
Brian Roberts	2	G	6'2"	175	Senior	Toledo, OH	Graduated
Andres Sandoval	3	G	6'4"	198	Senior	Milford, MA	Graduated
Jimmy Binnie	33	F	6'7"	211	Senior	Des Moines, IA	Graduated
Thiago Cordero	54	F	6'9"	220	Junior	Pernambuco, Brazil	Transferred

=== Incoming transfers ===
Name	Number	Pos.	Height	Weight	Year	Hometown	Previous School
Rob Lowery	3	G	6'2"	165	Junior	Forestville, MD	Junior college transfer from Cecil College.

== Incoming recruits ==
College recruiting information
Name	Hometown	School	Height	Weight	Commit date
Paul Williams; SG	Detroit, MI	Renaissance High School	6 ft 2 in (1.88 m)	200 lb (91 kg)	Aug 2, 2007
Paul Williams; SG	Recruit ratings: Scout: Rivals: (93)				
Chris Johnson; SF	Columbus, OH	Brookhaven High School	6 ft 4 in (1.93 m)	190 lb (86 kg)	Jun 10, 2007
Chris Johnson; SF	Recruit ratings: Scout: Rivals: (91)				
Josh Benson; PF	Dayton, OH	Dunbar High School	6 ft 9 in (2.06 m)	210 lb (95 kg)	Nov 1, 2006
Josh Benson; PF	Recruit ratings: Scout: Rivals: (89)				
Luke Fabrizius; F	Arlington Heights, IL	Hersey High School	6 ft 9 in (2.06 m)	205 lb (93 kg)	Sep 9, 2007
Luke Fabrizius; F	Recruit ratings: Scout: Rivals: (76)				
Overall recruit ranking:
Note: In many cases, Scout, Rivals, 247Sports, On3, and ESPN may conflict in their listings of height and weight.; In these cases, the average was taken. ESPN grades are on a 100-point scale.; Sources: "2008 Team Ranking". Rivals.

== Roster ==
2008–09 Dayton Flyers men's basketball team
Players
Coaches

Pos.	#	Name	Height	Weight	Year	Previous school	Hometown
G	0	Mickey Perry	6 ft 2 in (1.88 m)	197 lb (89 kg)	RS Jr	Proviso East	Maywood, IL
G	1	London Warren	6 ft 0 in (1.83 m)	185 lb (84 kg)	Jr	Raines	Jacksonville, FL
G	1	Robert Lowery	6 ft 2 in (1.88 m)	165 lb (75 kg)	Jr	McDonough; Cecil College	Forestville, MD
G/F	4	Chris Johnson	6 ft 5 in (1.96 m)	176 lb (80 kg)	Fr	Brookhaven	Columbus, OH
G	11	Stephen Thomas	6 ft 1 in (1.85 m)	170 lb (77 kg)	So	Cathedral	Indianapolis, IN
F	15	Charles Little	6 ft 6 in (1.98 m)	247 lb (112 kg)	Sr	Cleveland	Cleveland, TN
G	22	Paul Williams	6 ft 4 in (1.93 m)	213 lb (97 kg)	Fr	Renaissance	Detroit, MI
F	23	Luke Fabrizius	6 ft 9 in (2.06 m)	205 lb (93 kg)	Fr	Hersey	Arlington Heights, IL
F	24	Luke Hendrick (W)	6 ft 4 in (1.93 m)	170 lb (77 kg)	Jr	Nouvel Catholic Central	Saginaw, MI
F	30	Dan Fox (W)	6 ft 4 in (1.93 m)	187 lb (85 kg)	Jr	Lakeland	Wolcottville, IN
F	32	Marcus Johnson	6 ft 3 in (1.91 m)	196 lb (89 kg)	Jr	St. Vincent-St. Mary	Cleveland, OH
F	33	Chris Wright	6 ft 8 in (2.03 m)	226 lb (103 kg)	So	Trotwood-Madison	Trotwood, OH
F/C	34	Devin Searcy	6 ft 10 in (2.08 m)	226 lb (103 kg)	So	Romulus Senior	Romulus, MI
F/C	41	Kurt Huelsman	6 ft 10 in (2.08 m)	245 lb (111 kg)	Jr	St. Henry	St. Henry, OH
F/C	44	Josh Benson (injured) (redshirt)	6 ft 9 in (2.06 m)	205 lb (93 kg)	Fr	Dunbar	Dayton, OH
G	53	Brad McEldowney (W)	6 ft 1 in (1.85 m)	182 lb (83 kg)	So	Ansonia	Greebville, OH

Head coach

- Brian Gregory (Oakland)

Assistant coach(es)

- Billy Schmidt (Wake Forest)
- Jon Borovich (Central Michigan)
- Cornell Mann (Akron)

Legend

- (C) Team captain
- (S) Suspended
- (I) Ineligible
- (W) Walk-on
- Injured
- Current redshirt

Roster

== Schedule ==
Date time, TV	Rank^{#}	Opponent^{#}	Result	Record	Site (attendance) city, state
Exhibition
November 6, 2008*; 7:00 pm		Capital	W 98–73	–	UD Arena; Dayton, OH
November 11, 2008*; 7:00 pm		Gannon	W 67–59	–	UD Arena; Dayton, OH
Non-conference regular season
November 16, 2008*; 7:00 pm		Wofford	W 52–49	1–0	UD Arena (12,254); Dayton, OH
November 19, 2008*; 7:30 pm		Delaware State	W 62–42	2–0	UD Arena (11,906); Dayton, OH
November 23, 2008*; 2:00 pm		Bethune–Cookman; Chicago Invitational Challenge	W 78–38	3–0	UD Arena (12,678); Dayton, OH
November 25, 2008*; 7:30 pm		Mercer; Chicago Invitational Challenge	W 71–53	4–0	UD Arena (12,074); Dayton, OH
November 27, 2008*; 5:00 pm		vs. Auburn; Chicago Invitational Challenge	W 60–59 ^{ot}	5–0	Sears Centre (3,087); Hoffman Estates, IL
November 29, 2008*; 7:00 pm		vs. No. 15 Marquette; Chicago Invitational Challenge Championship Game	W 89–75	6–0	Sears Centre (4,780); Hoffman Estates, IL
December 2, 2008*; 7:30 pm		Troy	W 87–70	7–0	UD Arena (11,853); Dayton, OH
December 6, 2008*; 7:06 pm		at Akron	W 54–50	8–0	James A. Rhodes Arena (4,059); Akron, OH
December 10, 2008*; 8:07 pm		at Creighton	L 59–77	8–1	Qwest Center Omaha (15,418); Omaha, NE
December 13, 2008*; 8:00 pm		Coppin State	W 73–56	9–1	UD Arena (12,777); Dayton, OH
December 20, 2008*; 8:00 pm		UNC Greensboro	W 75–44	10–1	UD Arena (12,706); Dayton, OH
December 23, 2008*; 8:00 pm		Marshall	W 62–50	11–1	UD Arena (13,021); Dayton, OH
December 30, 2008*; 7:00 pm		George Mason	W 66–62	12–1	UD Arena (13,107); Dayton, OH
January 2, 2009*; 7:00 pm		at Toledo	W 77–63	13–1	Savage Arena (6,921); Toledo, OH
January 6, 2009*; 7:00 pm		Miami (OH)	W 45–40	14–1	UD Arena (12,637); Dayton, OH
Atlantic 10 regular season
January 10, 2009; 1:00 pm		vs. UMass	L 62–75	14–2 (0–1)	MassMutual Center (5,485); Springfield, MA
January 14, 2009; 7:30 pm		Fordham	W 72–71	15–2 (1–1)	UD Arena (11,993); Dayton, OH
January 17, 2009; 7:00 pm		at Duquesne	W 78–69	16–2 (2–1)	A.J. Palumbo Center (4,051); Pittsburgh, PA
January 22, 2009; 7:30 pm		at George Washington	W 63–61	17–2 (3–1)	Charles E. Smith Center (2,517); Washington, DC
January 25, 2009; 2:00 pm		St. Bonaventure	W 80–68	18–2 (4–1)	UD Arena (13,408); Dayton, OH
January 29, 2009; 8:00 pm		Saint Louis	W 47–46	19–2 (5–1)	UD Arena (12,436); Dayton, OH
February 1, 2009; 12:00 pm		Saint Joseph's	W 69–58	20–2 (6–1)	UD Arena (13,169); Dayton, OH
February 4, 2009; 7:00 pm		at La Salle	W 63–61	21–2 (7–1)	Tom Gola Arena (2,114); Philadelphia, PA
February 8, 2009; 1:00 pm		at Charlotte	L 66–79	21–3 (7–2)	Halton Arena (5,939); Charlotte, NC
February 11, 2009; 7:00 pm		No. 14 Xavier	W 71–58	22–3 (8–2)	UD Arena (13,435); Dayton, OH
February 14, 2009; 7:00 pm		Richmond	W 69–63	23–3 (9–2)	UD Arena (13,435); Dayton, OH
February 21, 2009; 8:00 pm, CBSSN	No. 25	at Saint Louis	L 49–57	23–4 (9–3)	Chaifetz Arena (10,603); St. Louis, MO
February 25, 2009; 7:00 pm		at Rhode Island	L 91–93 ^{OT}	23–5 (9–4)	Ryan Center (7,218); Kingston, RI
February 28, 2009; 4:00 pm		Temple	W 70–65	24–5 (10–4)	UD Arena (13,435); Dayton, OH
March 5, 2009; 9:00 pm		at No. 17 Xavier	L 56–79	24–6 (10–5)	Cintas Center (10,250); Cincinnati, OH
March 7, 2009; 9:00 pm		Duquesne	W 74–61	25–6 (11–5)	UD Arena (13,435); Dayton, OH
A-10 tournament
March 12, 2009; 9:00 pm	(3)	vs. (6) Richmond; Quarterfinals	W 69–64	26–6	Boardwalk Hall (4,333); Atlantic City, NJ
March 13, 2009; 9:00 pm	(3)	vs. (7) Duquesne; Semifinals	L 66–77	26–7	Boardwalk Hall (6,160); Atlantic City, NJ
NCAA Tournament
March 20, 2009*; 2:02 pm, CBS	(11 MW)	vs. (6 MW) West Virginia; First Round	W 68–60	27–7	Hubert H. Humphrey Metrodome (15,794); Minneapolis, MN
March 22, 2009*; 12:30 pm, CBS	(11 MW)	vs. (3 MW) No. 14 Kansas; Second round	L 43–60	27–8	Hubert H. Humphrey Metrodome (14,279); Minneapolis, MN
*Non-conference game. ^{#}Rankings from AP Poll. (#) Tournament seedings in parentheses. All times are in Eastern Time. (#) during NCAA Tournament is seed with Region MW=Midwest.
