= 2008–09 Xavier Musketeers men's basketball team =

American college basketball season

2008–09 Xavier Musketeers men's basketball

Atlantic 10 regular season champions Puerto Rico Tip-Off champions

NCAA tournament, Sweet Sixteen
- Conference: Atlantic 10 Conference

Ranking
- Coaches: No. 15
- AP: No. 20
- Record: 27–8 (12–4 A-10)
- Head coach: Sean Miller (5th season)
- Assistant coaches: Chris Mack; James Whitford; Emanuel Richardson
- Home arena: Cintas Center

2008–09 Atlantic 10 men's basketball standings
	Conf.				Overall
Team	W		L	PCT	W		L	PCT
No. 20 Xavier	12	–	4	.750	27	–	8	.771
Dayton	11	–	5	.688	27	–	8	.771
Rhode Island	11	–	5	.688	23	–	11	.676
Temple†	11	–	5	.688	22	–	12	.647
Duquesne	9	–	7	.563	21	–	13	.618
La Salle	9	–	7	.563	18	–	13	.581
Richmond	9	–	7	.563	20	–	16	.556
Saint Joseph's	9	–	7	.563	17	–	15	.531
Saint Louis	8	–	8	.500	18	–	14	.563
UMass	7	–	9	.438	12	–	18	.400
St. Bonaventure	6	–	10	.375	15	–	15	.500
Charlotte	5	–	11	.313	11	–	20	.355
George Washington	4	–	12	.250	10	–	18	.357
Fordham	1	–	15	.063	3	–	25	.107
† 2009 Atlantic 10 Tournament winner Rankings from AP Poll

The 2008–09 Xavier Musketeers men's basketball team represented Xavier University in the 2008–09 college basketball season. They were led by head coach Sean Miller in his fifth and final season at Xavier. The Musketeers were members of the Atlantic 10 Conference and played their home games at the Cintas Center. Xavier finished the season with a record of 27–8, 12–4 in A-10 play to win the regular season championship. The Musketeers lost in the quarterfinals of the A-10 tournament to Saint Louis. They received an at-large bid to the NCAA tournament as a #4 seed. The Musketeers defeated Portland State and Wisconsin to advance to the Sweet Sixteen before losing to Pittsburgh.

== Previous season ==
The Musketeers finished the 2007–08 season with a record of 30–7, 14–2 in conference play to win the regular season championship. Xavier lost to Saint Joseph's in the semifinals of the A-10 tournament. The Musketeers received an at-large bid as a #3 seed to the NCAA tournament where they advanced to the Elite Eight before losing to UCLA.

== Roster ==
2008–09 Xavier Musketeers men's basketball team
Name	Height	Position	Class	Summary
C. J. Anderson	6'6"	G	Jr.	10.7 Pts, 5.9 Reb, 1.5 Ast
Charles Bronson	6'9"	F	Jr.	2.1 Pts, 1.1 Reb, 0.1 Ast
Derrick Brown	6'8"	F	So.	10.9 Pts, 6.5 Reb, 1.7 Ast
Stanley Burrell	6'3"	G	St.	9.7 Pts, 2.2 Reb, 3.8 Ast
Stephen Duckett	6'4"	G	Sr.	0.3 Pts, 0.3 Reb, 0.0 Ast
Josh Duncan	6'9"	F	Sr.	12.4 Pts, 4.7 Reb, 1.3 Ast
Adrion Graves	6'4:	G	So.	1.9 Pts, 1.0 Reb, 0.6 Ast
Joe Hughes	6'6"	F	Fr.	0.4 Pts, 0.5 Reb, 0.3 Ast
Dante Jackson	6'5"	G	Fr.	2.4 Pts, 1.1 Reb, 0.6 Ast
Drew Lavender	5'7"	G	Sr.	10.8 Pts, 2.7 Reb, 4.5 Ast
Jason Love	6'9"	F	So.	6.0 Pts, 5.5 Reb, 0.5 Ast
B. J. Raymond	6'6"	F	Jr.	9.9 Pts, 3.0 Reb, 0.9 Ast

== Schedule and results ==
Date time, TV	Rank^{#}	Opponent^{#}	Result	Record	Site (attendance) city, state
Regular season
11/14/2008*		IPFW	W 71–43	1–0	Cintas Center; Cincinnati, Ohio
11/17/2008*		Toledo	W 81–65	2–0	Cintas Center; Cincinnati, Ohio
11/20/2008*		vs. Missouri; Puerto Rico Tip-Off quarterfinals	W 75–71	3–0	Jose Miguel Agrelot Coliseum; San Juan, Puerto Rico
11/21/2008*		vs. Virginia Tech; Puerto Rico Tip-Off semifinals	W 63–62 ^{OT}	4–0	Jose Miguel Agrelot Coliseum; San Juan, Puerto Rico
11/23/2008*		vs. No. 13 Memphis; Puerto Rico Tip-Off Finals	W 63–58	5–0	Jose Miguel Agrelot Coliseum; San Juan, Puerto Rico
11/29/2008*	No. 16	Miami (OH)	W 60–53	6–0	Cintas Center; Cincinnati, OH
12/3/2008*	No. 14	Auburn	W 81–74	7–0	Cintas Center; Cincinnati, Ohio
12/10/2008*	No. 10	Ohio	W 78–56	8–0	Cintas Center; Cincinnati, OH
12/13/2008*	No. 10	at Cincinnati	W 76–66	9–0	Fifth Third Arena; Cincinnati, Ohio
12/20/2008*; CBS	No. 7	vs. No. 6 Duke	L 64–82	9–1	Izod Center; East Rutherford, NJ
12/23/2008*	No. 14	Butler	L 65–74	9–2	Cintas Center; Cincinnati, Ohio
12/31/2008*	No. 22	Robert Morris	W 78–57	10–2	Cintas Center; Cincinnati, Ohio
1/3/2009*	No. 22	at Virginia	W 84–70	11–2	John Paul Jones Arena; Charlottesville, VA
1/8/2009	No. 16	Saint Louis	W 70–44	12–2 (1–0)	Cintas Center; Cincinnati, OH
1/11/2009	No. 16	at Fordham	W 86–60	13–2 (2–0)	Rose Hill Gym; Bronx, NY
1/15/2009	No. 15	at Rhode Island	W 67–65	14–2 (3–0)	Thomas M. Ryan Center; Kingston, RI
1/18/2008	No. 15	La Salle	W 73–53	15–2 (4–0)	Cintas Center; Cincinnati, Ohio
1/21/2009	No. 15	at St. Bonaventure	W 84–64	16–2 (5–0)	Reilly Center; St. Bonaventure, NY
1/24/2009*	No. 15	at LSU	W 80–70	17–2	Maravich Assembly Center; Baton Rouge, LA
1/28/2009	No. 10	Charlotte	W 69–47	18–2 (6–0)	Cintas Center; Cincinnati, Ohio
1/31/2009	No. 10	Massachusetts	W 82–80	19–2 (7–0)	Cintas Center; Cincinnati, Ohio
2/5/2009	No. 9	Temple	W 83–74	20–2 (8–0)	Cintas Center; Cincinnati, OH
2/7/2009	No. 9	at Duquesne	L 68–72	20–3 (8–1)	AJ Palumbo Center; Pittsburgh, PA
2/12/2009	No. 14	at Dayton	L 58-71	20–4 (8–2)	University of Dayton Arena; Dayton, OH
2/14/2009	No. 14	Fordham	W 88–53	21–4 (9–2)	Cintas Center; Cincinnati, Ohio
2/19/2009	No. 16	at Charlotte	L 60–65	21–5 (9–3)	Dale F. Halton Arena; Charlotte, North Carolina
2/22/2009	No. 16	George Washington	W 71–53	22–5 (10–3)	Cintas Center; Cincinnati, OH
2/26/2009	No. 19	at Saint Joseph's	W 65–54	23–5 (11–3)	The Palestra; Philadelphia, PA
3/5/2009	No. 17	Dayton	W 76–59	24–5 (12–3)	Cintas Center; Cincinnati, OH
3/7/2009	No. 17	at Richmond	L 75–80	24–6 (12–4)	Robins Center (10,031); Richmond, VA
A-10 tournament
3/12/2009	(1) No. 19	vs. (9) Saint Louis; Quarterfinals	W 66–47	25–6	Boardwalk Hall; Atlantic City, New Jersey
3/13/2009	(1) No. 19	vs. (4) Temple; Semifinals	L 53–55	25–7	Boardwalk Hall; Atlantic City, New Jersey
NCAA tournament
3/20/2009*; CBS	(4 E) No. 20	vs. (13 E) Portland State; First Round	W 77–59	26–7	Taco Bell Arena; Boise, ID
3/22/2009*; CBS	(4 E) No. 20	vs. (12 E) Wisconsin; Second Round	W 60–49	27–7	Taco Bell Arena; Boise, ID
3/26/2009*; CBS	(4 E) No. 20	vs. (1 E) No. 4 Pittsburgh; Sweet Sixteen	L 55–60	27–8	TD Banknorth Garden; Boston, MA
*Non-conference game. ^{#}Rankings from AP Poll. (#) Tournament seedings in parentheses.

== Rankings ==
Ranking movements Legend: ██ Increase in ranking ██ Decrease in ranking — = Not ranked т = Tied with team above or below
	Week																			
Poll	Pre	1	2	3	4	5	6	7	8	9	10	11	12	13	14	15	16	17	18	Final
AP	—	—	16	14	10	7	14	22	16	15	15	10	8	14	16	19	17	19	20	Not released
Coaches	—	—	20	14	9	7 т	12	22	18	16	13	10	9	14	17	22	18	19	22	15
