= 2009 NCAA Division I men's basketball tournament =

Edition of USA college basketball tournament

- Season: 2008–09
- Teams: 65
- Finals site: Ford Field, Detroit, Michigan
- Champions: North Carolina Tar Heels (5th title, 9th title game, 18th Final Four)
- Runner-up: Michigan State Spartans (3rd title game, 7th Final Four)
- Semifinalists: Connecticut Huskies (3rd Final Four); Villanova Wildcats (4th Final Four)
- Winning coach: Roy Williams (2nd title)
- MOP: Wayne Ellington (North Carolina)
- Attendance: 708,296
- Top scorer: Wayne Ellington (North Carolina) (115 points)

The 2009 NCAA Division I men's basketball tournament involved 65 teams playing in a single-elimination tournament that determined the National Collegiate Athletic Association (NCAA) Division I men's basketball national champion for the 2008–09 season. The 71st annual edition of the tournament began on March 17, 2009, and concluded with the championship game on April 6 at Ford Field in Detroit, Michigan.

The University of North Carolina defeated Michigan State to become the champion. It was the Tar Heels 5th title, and 2nd under Roy Williams. The 2009 tournament was the first time the Final Four had a minimum seating capacity of 70,000, and by having most of the tournament in the February Sweeps of the Nielsen Ratings due to the digital television transition in the United States on June 12, 2009, this was the last NCAA basketball tournament, in all three divisions, to air on analog television.

Prior to the start of the tournament, the top ranked team was Louisville in both the AP Top 25 and the ESPN/USA Today Coaches' Polls, followed by North Carolina, Memphis, and Pittsburgh. Only the Tar Heels of North Carolina were the regional winners and played in the Final Four. The Tar Heels completed one of the most dominant runs in the tournament's history by winning each of their games by at least twelve points.

For the first time since seeding began, all #1 to #3 seeds made it into the Sweet 16, and for the third consecutive time, all #1 seeds made the Elite Eight.

Four schools made their NCAA tournament debut, all respective conference champions: Binghamton (America East), Morgan State (MEAC), Stephen F. Austin (Southland), and North Dakota State (Summit), a school in its first season of Division I eligibility.

== Tournament procedure ==
Sixty-five teams were selected for the tournament. Thirty of the teams earned automatic bids by winning their conference tournaments. The automatic bid of the Ivy League, which does not conduct a postseason tournament, went to Cornell, its regular season champion. The remaining 34 teams were granted "at-large" bids by the NCAA Selection Committee.

Two teams play an opening-round game, popularly called the "play-in game". The winner of that game advances to the main draw of the tournament as a 16 seed and plays a top seed in one of the regionals. The 2009 game was played on Tuesday, March 17, at the University of Dayton Arena in Dayton, Ohio, as it has since its inception in 2001.

All 64 teams were seeded 1 to 16 within their regions; the winner of the play-in game automatically received a 16 seed. The Selection Committee seeded the entire field from 1 to 65. SEC commissioner Michael Slive served his last year as chairman of the committee.

== Schedule and venues ==
2009 Opening Round game (orange) and first and second rounds (green)
2009 Regionals (blue) and Final Four (red)

The following are the sites that were selected to host each round of the 2009 tournament:

Opening Round

- March 17
  - University of Dayton Arena, Dayton, Ohio (Host: University of Dayton)

First and Second Rounds

- March 19 and 21
  - Greensboro Coliseum, Greensboro, North Carolina (Host: Atlantic Coast Conference)
  - Sprint Center, Kansas City, Missouri (Host: Big 12 Conference)
  - Wachovia Center, Philadelphia, Pennsylvania (Host: Saint Joseph's University)
  - Rose Garden, Portland, Oregon (Host: University of Oregon)
- March 20 and 22
  - Taco Bell Arena, Boise, Idaho (Host: Boise State University)
  - University of Dayton Arena, Dayton, Ohio (Host: University of Dayton)
  - American Airlines Arena, Miami, Florida (Host: Florida International University)
  - Hubert H. Humphrey Metrodome, Minneapolis, Minnesota (Host: University of Minnesota)

Regional semifinals and Finals (Sweet Sixteen and Elite Eight)

- March 26 and 28
  - East Regional, TD Garden, Boston, Massachusetts (Host: Boston College)
  - West Regional, University of Phoenix Stadium, Glendale, Arizona (Host: Arizona State University)
- March 27 and 29
  - South Regional, FedExForum, Memphis, Tennessee (Host: University of Memphis)
  - Midwest Regional, Lucas Oil Stadium, Indianapolis, Indiana (Hosts: Horizon League, Butler University)

National semifinals and championship (Final Four and championship)

- April 4 and 6
  - Ford Field, Detroit, Michigan (Host: University of Detroit Mercy)

== Qualifying teams ==

=== Automatic bids ===
The following teams were automatic qualifiers for the 2009 NCAA field by virtue of winning their conference's tournament (except for the Ivy League, whose regular-season champion received the automatic bid).

| Conference | School | Appearance | Last bid |
|---|---|---|---|
| ACC | Duke | 33rd | 2008 |
| America East | Binghamton | 1st | Never |
| Atlantic 10 | Temple | 27th | 2008 |
| Atlantic Sun | East Tennessee State | 8th | 2004 |
| Big 12 | Missouri | 22nd | 2003 |
| Big East | Louisville | 35th | 2008 |
| Big Sky | Portland State | 2nd | 2008 |
| Big South | Radford | 2nd | 1998 |
| Big Ten | Purdue | 23rd | 2008 |
| Big West | Cal State Northridge | 2nd | 2001 |
| Colonial | VCU | 8th | 2007 |
| C-USA | Memphis | 22nd | 2008 |
| Horizon | Cleveland State | 2nd | 1986 |
| Ivy League | Cornell | 4th | 2008 |
| MAAC | Siena | 5th | 2008 |
| MAC | Akron | 2nd | 1986 |
| MEAC | Morgan State | 1st | Never |
| Missouri Valley | Northern Iowa | 5th | 2006 |
| Mountain West | Utah | 27th | 2005 |
| Northeast | Robert Morris | 6th | 1992 |
| Ohio Valley | Morehead State | 6th | 1984 |
| Pac-10 | USC | 15th | 2008 |
| Patriot | American | 2nd | 2008 |
| SEC | Mississippi State | 10th | 2008 |
| Southern | Chattanooga | 10th | 2005 |
| Southland | Stephen F. Austin | 1st | Never |
| Summit | North Dakota State | 1st | Never |
| Sun Belt | Western Kentucky | 21st | 2008 |
| SWAC | Alabama State | 3rd | 2004 |
| WAC | Utah State | 18th | 2006 |
| West Coast | Gonzaga | 12th | 2008 |

=== Listed by region and seeding ===
East Regional – Boston
| Seed | School | Conference | Record | Berth type |
|---|---|---|---|---|
| 1 | Pittsburgh | Big East | 31–4 | At-large |
| 2 | Duke | ACC | 30–6 | Automatic |
| 3 | Villanova | Big East | 30–7 | At-large |
| 4 | Xavier | Atlantic 10 | 28–7 | At-large |
| 5 | Florida State | ACC | 25–9 | At-large |
| 6 | UCLA | Pac-10 | 26–8 | At-large |
| 7 | Texas | Big 12 | 23–11 | At-large |
| 8 | Oklahoma State | Big 12 | 23–11 | At-large |
| 9 | Tennessee | SEC | 21–12 | At-large |
| 10 | Minnesota | Big Ten | 22–10 | At-large |
| 11 | VCU | CAA | 24–9 | Automatic |
| 12 | Wisconsin | Big Ten | 20–12 | At-large |
| 13 | Portland State | Big Sky | 23–9 | Automatic |
| 14 | American | Patriot | 24–7 | Automatic |
| 15 | Binghamton | America East | 23–8 | Automatic |
| 16 | East Tennessee State | Atlantic Sun | 23–10 | Automatic |

South Regional – Memphis
| Seed | School | Conference | Record | Berth type |
|---|---|---|---|---|
| 1 | North Carolina | ACC | 28–4 | At-large |
| 2 | Oklahoma | Big 12 | 27–5 | At-large |
| 3 | Syracuse | Big East | 26–9 | At-large |
| 4 | Gonzaga | West Coast | 26–5 | Automatic |
| 5 | Illinois | Big Ten | 24–9 | At-large |
| 6 | Arizona State | Pac-10 | 24–9 | At-large |
| 7 | Clemson | ACC | 23–8 | At-large |
| 8 | LSU | SEC | 26–7 | At-large |
| 9 | Butler | Horizon | 26–5 | At-large |
| 10 | Michigan | Big Ten | 20–13 | At-large |
| 11 | Temple | Atlantic 10 | 22–11 | Automatic |
| 12 | Western Kentucky | Sun Belt | 24–8 | Automatic |
| 13 | Akron | Mid-American | 23–12 | Automatic |
| 14 | Stephen F. Austin | Southland | 24–7 | Automatic |
| 15 | Morgan State | MEAC | 23–11 | Automatic |
| 16 | Radford | Big South | 21–11 | Automatic |

Midwest Regional – Indianapolis
| Seed | School | Conference | Record | Berth type |
|---|---|---|---|---|
| 1 | Louisville | Big East | 28–5 | Automatic |
| 2 | Michigan State | Big Ten | 26–6 | At-large |
| 3 | Kansas | Big 12 | 25–7 | At-large |
| 4 | Wake Forest | ACC | 24–6 | At-large |
| 5 | Utah | Mountain West | 24–9 | Automatic |
| 6 | West Virginia | Big East | 23–11 | At-large |
| 7 | Boston College | ACC | 22–11 | At-large |
| 8 | Ohio State | Big Ten | 22–10 | At-large |
| 9 | Siena | MAAC | 26–7 | Automatic |
| 10 | USC | Pac-10 | 21–12 | Automatic |
| 11 | Dayton | Atlantic 10 | 26–7 | At-large |
| 12 | Arizona | Pac-10 | 19–13 | At-large |
| 13 | Cleveland State | Horizon | 25–10 | Automatic |
| 14 | North Dakota State | Summit | 26–6 | Automatic |
| 15 | Robert Morris | Northeast | 24–10 | Automatic |
| 16 | Alabama State | SWAC | 22–9 | Automatic |
| 16 | Morehead State | Ohio Valley | 19–15 | Automatic |

West Regional – Glendale
| Seed | School | Conference | Record | Berth type |
|---|---|---|---|---|
| 1 | Connecticut | Big East | 27–4 | At-large |
| 2 | Memphis | C-USA | 31–3 | Automatic |
| 3 | Missouri | Big 12 | 28–6 | Automatic |
| 4 | Washington | Pac-10 | 25–8 | At-large |
| 5 | Purdue | Big Ten | 25–9 | Automatic |
| 6 | Marquette | Big East | 24–9 | At-large |
| 7 | California | Pac-10 | 22–10 | At-large |
| 8 | BYU | Mountain West | 25–7 | At-large |
| 9 | Texas A&M | Big 12 | 23–9 | At-large |
| 10 | Maryland | ACC | 20–13 | At-large |
| 11 | Utah State | WAC | 30–4 | Automatic |
| 12 | Northern Iowa | Missouri Valley | 23–10 | Automatic |
| 13 | Mississippi State | SEC | 23–12 | Automatic |
| 14 | Cornell | Ivy League | 21–9 | Automatic |
| 15 | Cal State Northridge | Big West | 17–13 | Automatic |
| 16 | Chattanooga | So Con | 18–16 | Automatic |

== Bracket ==
Results to date

All times in U.S. ET.

=== Opening Round Game – Dayton, Ohio ===
Winner advanced to Midwest Regional vs. (1) Louisville.

| Opening Round |
| 16 | Morehead State | 58 |
| 16 | Alabama State | 43 |

=== Midwest Regional – Indianapolis, Indiana ===
First round March 19–20
1 | Louisville | 74
16 | Morehead State | 54
Dayton - Fri/Sun
8 | Ohio State | 72
9 | Siena | 74^{2OT}
5 | Utah | 71
12 | Arizona | 84
Miami - Fri/Sun
4 | Wake Forest | 69
13 | Cleveland State | 84
6 | West Virginia | 60
11 | Dayton | 68
Minneapolis - Fri/Sun
3 | Kansas | 84
14 | North Dakota State | 74
7 | Boston College | 55
10 | USC | 72
Minneapolis - Fri/Sun
2 | Michigan State | 77
15 | Robert Morris | 62

Second round March 21–22
1 | Louisville | 79
9 | Siena | 72
12 | Arizona | 71
13 | Cleveland State | 57
11 | Dayton | 43
3 | Kansas | 60
10 | USC | 69
2 | Michigan State | 74

Regional semifinals March 27
1 | Louisville | 103
12 | Arizona | 64
3 | Kansas | 62
2 | Michigan State | 67

Regional finals March 29
1 | Louisville | 52
2 | Michigan State | 64

=== West Regional – Glendale, Arizona ===
First round March 19–20
1 | Connecticut | 103
16 | Chattanooga | 47
Philadelphia - Thu/Sat
8 | BYU | 66
9 | Texas A&M | 79
5 | Purdue | 61
12 | Northern Iowa | 56
Portland - Thu/Sat
4 | Washington | 71
13 | Mississippi State | 58
6 | Marquette | 58
11 | Utah State | 57
Boise - Fri/Sun
3 | Missouri | 78
14 | Cornell | 59
7 | California | 71
10 | Maryland | 84
Kansas City - Thu/Sat
2 | Memphis | 81
15 | Cal State Northridge | 70

Second round March 21–22
1 | Connecticut | 92
9 | Texas A&M | 66
5 | Purdue | 76
4 | Washington | 74
6 | Marquette | 79
3 | Missouri | 83
10 | Maryland | 70
2 | Memphis | 89

Regional semifinals March 26
1 | Connecticut | 72
5 | Purdue | 60
3 | Missouri | 102
2 | Memphis | 91

Regional finals March 28
1 | Connecticut | 82
3 | Missouri | 75

=== East Regional – Boston, Massachusetts ===
First round March 19–20
1 | Pittsburgh | 72
16 | East Tennessee State | 62
Dayton - Fri/Sun
8 | Oklahoma State | 77
9 | Tennessee | 75
5 | Florida St. | 59
12 | Wisconsin | 61^{OT}
Boise - Fri/Sun
4 | Xavier | 77
13 | Portland St. | 59
6 | UCLA | 65
11 | VCU | 64
Philadelphia - Thu/Sat
3 | Villanova | 80
14 | American | 67
7 | Texas | 76
10 | Minnesota | 62
Greensboro - Thu/Sat
2 | Duke | 86
15 | Binghamton | 62

Second round March 21–22
1 | Pittsburgh | 84
8 | Oklahoma State | 76
12 | Wisconsin | 49
4 | Xavier | 60
6 | UCLA | 69
3 | Villanova | 89
7 | Texas | 69
2 | Duke | 74

Regional semifinals March 26
1 | Pittsburgh | 60
4 | Xavier | 55
3 | Villanova | 77
2 | Duke | 54

Regional finals March 28
1 | Pittsburgh | 76
3 | Villanova | 78

=== South Regional – Memphis, Tennessee ===
First round March 19–20
1 | North Carolina | 101
16 | Radford | 58
Greensboro - Thu/Sat
8 | LSU | 75
9 | Butler | 71
5 | Illinois | 72
12 | Western Kentucky | 76
Portland - Thu/Sat
4 | Gonzaga | 77
13 | Akron | 64
6 | Arizona State | 66
11 | Temple | 57
Miami - Fri/Sun
3 | Syracuse | 59
14 | Stephen F. Austin | 44
7 | Clemson | 59
10 | Michigan | 62
Kansas City - Thu/Sat
2 | Oklahoma | 82
15 | Morgan State | 54

Second round March 21–22
1 | North Carolina | 84
8 | LSU | 70
12 | Western Kentucky | 81
4 | Gonzaga | 83
6 | Arizona State | 67
3 | Syracuse | 78
10 | Michigan | 63
2 | Oklahoma | 73

Regional semifinals March 27
1 | North Carolina | 98
4 | Gonzaga | 77
3 | Syracuse | 71
2 | Oklahoma | 84

Regional finals March 29
1 | North Carolina | 72
2 | Oklahoma | 60

=== Final Four – Ford Field, Detroit, Michigan ===
National semifinals April 4
MW2 | Michigan State | 82
W1 | Connecticut | 73
E3 | Villanova | 69
S1 | North Carolina | 83

National Championship Game; April 6
MW2 | Michigan State | 72
S1 | North Carolina | 89

== Game summaries ==
=== Midwest Region ===
Goran Suton of Michigan State was the Midwest regional most outstanding player. He was joined by Spartan teammates Kalin Lucas and Travis Walton, Louisville's Earl Clark and Kansas's Cole Aldrich on the NCAA tournament All-Midwest Regional team.

==== First round ====
To play the top-seeded Louisville Cardinals in the first round, Morehead State defeated Alabama State 58–43, with the Eagles keeping the Hornets without a lead the entire game. This marked the first time either team had played in the tournament in five years; the Eagles had not played since 1984. Morehead State fell to Louisville 74–54, the 100th time a 1 seed beat a 16 seed in the tournament since seeding began. However, the Eagles managed to keep the game close until halftime, when Louisville led by only 2 points. In the second half, the Cardinals began to apply their signature fullcourt pressure, forcing turnovers and outscoring Morehead State 22–6 at the beginning of the half. Leon Buchanan's 17 points for the Eagles were not enough to upset Louisville, whose top scorers, Samardo Samuels and Terrence Williams, scored a combined 28 points. Morehead State has not beaten Louisville in 52 years until 2011.

In two overtimes, the Siena Saints beat the Ohio State Buckeyes 74–72. Ohio State had the advantage of playing an hour from their campus, and received 25 points, nine rebounds, and eight assists from Evan Turner. The Saints made 6 out of 23 3-pointers and had 22 turnovers. Accordingly, Siena trailed for most of the game, but scored the last four points in regulation to force overtime. At the end of the first overtime, Siena's Ronald Moore drained his first 3-pointer to force a second overtime. With 3.9 seconds left in that overtime, he hit a second three from the same location to give the Saints a late 2-point lead. In an attempt to send the game into a third overtime, Turner shot a 15-footer immediately afterwards, but he missed it. This was Siena's fifth appearance in the tournament, after beating Vanderbilt University in 2008 as a 13 seed.

The Arizona-Utah matchup was not as close. The Fifth-seeded Utah Utes were upset by the twelfth-seeded Arizona Wildcats, one of the last teams to make it in the tournament and a questionable entry, by a score of 84–71. The Utes closed the lead to two with roughly five minutes left in the game, but the Wildcats' answer was a 10–1 run. Utah's Luke Nevill committed two fouls less than four minutes into the game and scored only 12 points. Nic Wise of Arizona, meanwhile, led the team with 29 points, with 21 in the second half. Tyler Kepkay led the Utes with a team 19 points in his embarking performance.

The Cleveland State-Wake Forest game was an even larger upset. In their second bid in the tournament, the Cleveland State Vikings shocked the Wake Forest Demon Deacons 84–69. This 15-point win ties for third-greatest victory margin for a 13 seed over a 4 seed. Wake Forest, once ranked first in the country, had 16 turnovers in the matchup, compared to six for the Vikings. James Johnson of the Demon Deacons scored 22 points, although this could not compensate for a substandard offense. Their scoring leader, Jeff Teague, finished with 10 points, half his average. For these reasons, Wake Forest never obtained a lead, while Cleveland State sank three consecutive 3-pointers in the early minutes of the game.

For the first time in 19 years, Dayton advanced to the second round of the tournament with a win over West Virginia 68–60. This also ended West Virginia's first-round winning streak, which had lasted since 1992. Chris Wright led the Dayton Flyers with 27 points, a career high, while also chalking up 10 rebounds. Charles Little also aided the Flyers with 18 points. Darryl Bryant, who led West Virginia with 21 points, shot two consecutive three-pointers to bring Dayton's lead to 48–47 with 11:02 minutes left in the game. However, that was the closest the Mountaineers had to a lead outside the beginning of the game.

In their first eligible year, North Dakota State appeared in the tournament, facing defending champion Kansas. The three-seeded Kansas Jayhawks staved off the fourteenth-seeded Bison's upset bid with an 84–74 victory. Ben Woodside shined with 37 points for the Bison, his sixth game of the season with at least 30 points. However, Sherron Collins and Cole Aldrich proved too much for North Dakota State, accounting for 65 percent of the Jayhawks' points with 32 and 23 respectively.

The tenth-seeded USC Trojans demolished the seventh-seeded Boston College Eagles by a score of 72–55, helped by Taj Gibson's 10-for-10 shooting from the field, tied for the second-best NCAA tournament field-goal shooting performance in history. He led the team with 24 points and recorded six rebounds, five assists, and three blocks. Dwight Lewis also added 20 points for the Trojans. After leading 34–30 at halftime, the Eagles scored just a single field goal during one 13-minute stretch, as part of a 23.1 shooting percentage in the second half.

Robert Morris, the region's 15 seed, was blown away by second-seeded Michigan State 77–62. The game was tied with 4:44 left in the first half, but then the Colonials went almost 20 minutes without scoring a single point. The Spartans took advantage of this for a 21–0 run that sealed the game in their favor. The Colonials' Jeremy Chappell was the only team member to score double-digit points with 11, and he also led the team with six rebounds, two steals, and three blocks. Raymar Morgan was the Spartans' leading scorer with 16 points.

==== Second round ====
Ninth-seeded Siena faced top seed Louisville, with the Cardinals emerging victorious 79–72. Taking advantage of Louisville's 19 turnovers, the Saints came back from a 12-point deficit with 17:21 left in the game to snatch the lead around the 9-minute mark. Edwin Ubiles broke through Louisville's full-court pressure and added 24 points for Siena. Terrence Williams, known as one of the most relaxed players on the Cardinals roster, saved his team by grabbing rebounds and making 3s. He led the team with 24 points, 15 rebounds, two steals, and four assists. Earl Clark also helped the Cardinals' cause with 12 points and 12 rebounds.

In a 12 vs. 13 seed Cinderella matchup, Arizona handily defeated Cleveland State. The Wildcats' zone defense puzzled Cleveland State, and their fast breaks sealed the game. The smallest deficit the Vikings faced was 48–44 about midway through the second half, though the Wildcats then went on a 13–2 run led by Nic Wise's five consecutive points. His 21 points led the team's four double-digit scorers. Arizona was excellent behind the free-throw line, finishing 24 for 28.

Cole Aldrich's triple-double with 13 points, 20 rebounds, and 10 blocked shots paved the way for a third-seeded Kansas win over 11 seed Dayton. This was only the sixth triple-double in NCAA tournament history. With 43 points, Dayton scored the fewest points they had all season, compared to Kansas's 60. Despite their small point total, the Flyers shot 72 times, its most all season, amounting to a 22.2 shooting percentage. The Jayhawks were also not having one of their better offensive games, with Sherron Collins being an exception; he made 25 points. This marked the third straight Sweet Sixteen appearance for Kansas.

Playing the tenth-seeded USC Trojans, second-seeded Michigan State utilized Travis Walton's career-high 18 points for a 74–69 win. Normally known as a defensive player and averaging 4.9 points per game, Walton shot 8 for 13 from the field. His team out-rebounded USC 33 to 23, and USC made only one three-point play. Star Trojan Taj Gibson was in foul trouble throughout much of the game, and yet his teammates rallied for 14 lead changes and 16 ties. Dwight Lewis, who gave a 19-point performance overall, scored six consecutive points for USC for a late tie. The Spartans only earned a victory after the Trojans missed their last nine shots. With the win, Michigan State has made it to the Sweet 16 eight times of the last 12 years, more than any other team except Duke.

==== Regional semifinals (Sweet Sixteen) ====
Louisville, the region's top seed, routed twelfth-seeded Arizona 103–64. In NCAA tournament history, this was Louisville's largest win and Arizona's largest loss. It was no surprise, given the Cardinals' 57.6 field goal percentage and their 48% shooting behind the arc. Their fullcourt pressure forced 15 turnovers on the Wildcats the entire game, including nine in the first half. Earl Clark led the Cardinals with 19 points, whose ballhandling garnered 29 assists. This was the most lopsided Sweet 16 victory since 1972.

The Michigan State-Kansas matchup was much more intense. After overcoming a 13-point first half deficit, the Spartans won 67–62. They shot 16 of 17 from the foul line, and on their only miss they rebounded the ball and gave Raymar Morgan the only points of the night on a dunk. Such rallies in the second half narrowed the deficit and occasionally took the lead, although the Jayhawks responded and were up by 2 with 2 minutes left in the game. They were helped by Sherron Collins and Cole Aldrich's combined 37 points. However, Kalin Lucas of the Spartans, who had scored 11 points in the first 39 minutes of the game, made seven straight points with 48 seconds left. Goran Suton also added nine rebounds, five steals, and a season-high 20 points for Michigan State.

==== Regional final (Elite Eight) ====
Michigan State defeated overall number one seed Louisville, 64–52, to advance to their fifth Final Four since 1999. Michigan State held Louisville to their second lowest point total of the season with their man-to-man defense keeping them out of sync all game. Center Goran Suton had 19 points and Durrel Summers had 12 in the rout. Earl Clark had 19 for Louisville.

CBS

Sunday, March 29
2:20 pm

box score

#2 Michigan State Spartans 64, #1 Louisville Cardinals 52
Scoring by half: 30–27, 34–25
| Pts: G. Suton – 19; Rebs: G. Suton, Draymond Green – 10; Asts: K. Lucas – 5 | Pts: E. Clark – 19; Rebs: S. Samuels – 7 Asts: T. Williams – 4 |

Lucas Oil Stadium – Indianapolis, IN
Attendance: 36,084
Referees: David Hall, Curtis Shaw, Tony Greene

=== West Region ===
A. J. Price was named MVP of the West Regional. He was joined by teammate Kemba Walker, Missouri's DeMarre Carroll and J. T. Tiller and Memphis' Tyreke Evans on the NCAA West All-regional team.

==== First round ====
Forward Quincy Pondexter scored 23 points to lead his Washington Huskies to a first round 71–58 win over Mississippi State Bulldogs in the West Regional. Only Barry Stewart put up double digit points (14) for the Bulldogs.

==== Second round ====
Pac-10 champions Washington Huskies scored 46 points in the second half, but it was not enough to beat the Purdue Boilermakers in the second round of West Regional, falling short by two points (76–74). Leaders for Purdue were JaJuan Johnson with 22 points and Keaton Grant with 12 rebounds. Isaiah Thomas with 24 points and Jon Brockman with 18 rebounds led the Huskies.

==== Regional semifinals (Sweet Sixteen) ====
Connecticut faced Purdue at University of Phoenix Stadium in a West Regional semifinal. It was UConn who took full advantage of many Purdue mistakes and, even though Robbie Hummel was able to shoot quite well scoring 17 points, it was Hasheem Thabeet and the Huskies who pulled away for a 72–60 win to move onto the regional finals.

In the nightcap of the sweet sixteen matchups, two sets of Tigers met, pitting Missouri against Memphis in a matchup that saw teams with similar fast-paced styles meet. Missouri was able to pull away with a 27–7 run that gave them a 64–40 lead. Though Memphis attempted to claw back into the game through Tyreke Evans' 33 points, it was JT Tiller, DeMarre Carroll, and Leo Lyons that moved on to meet UConn in the regional final along with the rest of their Missouri Tigers.

==== Regional final (Elite Eight) ====
Kemba Walker came off the UConn bench to spark them to a victory over the 3 seeded Missouri Tigers.

CBS

Saturday, March 28
4:40 pm

box score

#1 Connecticut Huskies 82, #3 Missouri Tigers 75
Scoring by half: 44–38, 38–37
| Pts: K. Walker – 23; Rebs: H. Thabeet – 13; Asts: K. Walker – 5 | Pts: M. Lawrence, L. Lyons – 13; Rebs: J.T. Tiller – 5 Asts: J.T. Tiller – 5 |

University of Phoenix Stadium – Glendale, AZ
Attendance: 18,886
Referees: John Cahill, Mike Littlewood, Les Jones

=== East Region ===
Scottie Reynolds was named Regional most outstanding player. He was joined by teammates Dwayne Anderson and Dante Cunningham, Panthers Sam Young and DeJuan Blair on the NCAA East All-Regional team.

==== First round ====
UCLA Bruins' Alfred Aboya scored two free-throw points with 48 seconds remaining in the game to help UCLA get by VCU in the first round at the East Regional in Philadelphia's Wachovia Center with Maynor's potential game winning jumper bouncing off the rim at the buzzer. Top scorers in the game were Eric Maynor (21) for VCU and Josh Shipp (16) for UCLA.

Villanova Wildcats, playing at home against an American University team that featured 5 seniors, fell behind early as American hit a barrage of 3 pointers. However, in the 2nd half, Villanova was able to take advantage of 20 free throws in the final 13 minutes of the game to win against American.

No. 12 seed Wisconsin upset #5 seed Florida St. 61–59 in OT. Down 31–19 at the half, the Badgers' Jason Bohannon made a three-point jumper to give Wisconsin the lead with 45 seconds left in regulation. Trevon Hughes fouled Toney Douglas, who made two free throws to send the game into over-time. In over-time, the Badgers trailed by one with just seconds left when Hughes made a twisting shot from the lane over two defenders to put the Badgers ahead 60–59. Hughes was also fouled on the shot, and made the resulting free throw to make the score 61–59. Florida State had just enough time to run a full court in-bounds play but, the pass was deflected at half court thus securing the Badger victory.

==== Second round ====
By six Wildcats scoring double-digit points, Villanova ended UCLA's hope of going to the Final Four for the fourth time in a row. Dante Cunningham had 18 points; Reggie Redding and Corey Fisher had 13; Corey Stokes put up 12; eleven points came from Scottie Reynolds and ten points were put up by Dwayne Anderson for the winning team. Josh Shipp had 18 points and Alfred Aboya had 8 rebounds for UCLA.

==== Regional semifinals (Sweet Sixteen) ====
Villanova (#3) upset Duke (#2), 77–54, to advance to the Regional Championship game to face Pittsburgh (#1). The Wildcats, who were ahead by 3 at half-time, were led in scoring by Scottie Reynolds (16), Dante Cunningham (14) and Reggie Redding (11).

==== Regional final (Elite Eight) ====
Number one seed Pittsburgh was upset by the Villanova Wildcats, 78–76 in the East Regional Finals, denying the Panthers a chance for a first national championship in men's basketball. With five seconds remaining, Levance Fields, who was fouled by Corey Fisher, shot two free-throws to tie the game for Pitt. But Scottie Reynolds' one-second jumper was good to give Villanova an upset victory. Pitt's Sam Young scored 28 points and DeJuan Blair had 20 points. Dwayne Anderson was top scorer for the Wildcats with 17 points.

CBS

Saturday, March 28
7:05 pm

box score

#3 Villanova Wildcats 78, #1 Pittsburgh Panthers 76
Scoring by half: 32–34, 46–42
| Pts: D. Anderson – 17; Rebs: R. Redding, D. Anderson – 6 Asts: R. Redding – 5 | Pts: S. Young – 28; Rebs: D. Blair – 10; Asts: L. Fields – 6 |

TD Garden – Boston, MA
Attendance: 18,871
Referees: Tom O'Neill, Pat Driscoll, Randy Mccall

=== South Region ===
Ty Lawson was the South regional MVP and he was joined on the All-regional team by teammates Danny Green and Tyler Hansbrough as well as Blake Griffin and Syracuse's Jonny Flynn.

==== First round ====
WKU advanced to the second round for a second consecutive year as a 12 seed, beating 5th seeded Illinois. 10th seeded Michigan upset 7th seeded Clemson 62–59 in its first tournament win since 1998. It was Michigan's first tournament appearance in 11 years after the school was rocked with sanctions and punishments from the Chris Webber scandal in the mid-2000s.

==== Regional final (Elite Eight) ====
CBS

Sunday, March 29
5:05 pm

box score

#1 North Carolina Tar Heels 72, #2 Oklahoma Sooners 60
Scoring by half: 32–23, 40–37
| Pts: T. Lawson – 19; Rebs: T. Hansbrough – 6 Asts: T. Lawson – 5 | Pts: B. Griffin – 23; Rebs: B. Griffin – 16; Asts: A. Johnson, W. Warren – 3 |

FedEx Forum – Memphis, Tennessee
Attendance: 17,025
Referees: Verne Harris, John Hughes, Tom Eades

=== Final Four ===
All final four teams in the tournament had won at least one national championship. Entering the tournament, North Carolina had the most, with four (1957, 1982, 1993, 2005); Connecticut had two; (1999, 2004); Michigan State also had two; (1979, 2000), and Villanova won one; (1985).

The Spartans had home court advantage by playing in their home state. Six teams have played the Final Four in their home states, but only four of them won. UCLA (1968, 1972, 1975) and North Carolina State (1974) won the national title, but Duke (1994) and Purdue (1980) lost in the Final Four. The biggest advantage came in 1968 and 1972 when UCLA played the championship game at the Los Angeles Memorial Sports Arena, which is a short distance from Pauley Pavilion, their home court since 1965.

==== Michigan State vs. Connecticut ====
CBS

April 4
6:07 EDT

box score

#2 Michigan State 82, #1 Connecticut 73
Scoring by half: 38–36, 44–37
| Pts: K. Lucas – 21; Rebs: R. Morgan – 8 Asts: T. Walton – 8 | Pts: H. Thabeet – 17; Rebs: S. Robinson – 13; Asts: C. Austrie, K. Walker – 2 |

Ford Field – Detroit, MI
Attendance: 72,456
Referees: John Cahill, Mike Stuart, Les Jones

Michigan State, with 7 minutes to play, finally took hold of the game and defeated the number one seed Connecticut to advance to the championship game against North Carolina. The Spartans started the game with a 7-point run, but the Huskies came back to take a lead in the first half. Michigan State took it back and was leading by two at the half. Connecticut had the lead twice early in the second period. Michigan State, led by guard Kalin Lucas with 21 points and forward Raymar Morgan with 18 points, was just too much at the end for the Huskies. Scoring for Connecticut was shared by Jeff Adrien (13), Stanley Robinson (15), Hasheem Thabeet (17) and A.J. Price (15).

==== Villanova vs. North Carolina ====
CBS

April 4
8:47 EDT

box score

#1 North Carolina 83, #3 Villanova 69
Scoring by half: 49–40, 34–29
| Pts: T. Lawson – 22; Rebs: T. Hansbrough – 11; Asts: T. Lawson – 8 | Pts: S. Reynolds – 17; Rebs: D. Cunningham – 12; Asts: S. Reynolds – 5 |

Ford Field – Detroit, MI
Attendance: 72,456
Referees: Scott Thornley, Karl Hess, Pat Driscoll

After the first five minutes, North Carolina used an 11-point run to end Villanova's hope for a national championship and put the Tar Heels into the championship game for a chance to win their fifth title in nine trips. Ty Lawson produced 22 points, followed by Wayne Ellington with 20 points and Tyler Hansbrough with 18 points. Hansbrough, the sixth-leading scorer in tournament history, pulled down 11 rebounds. For Roy Williams, who coached North Carolina to a national championship in 2005, it is back to the title game again.

==== Championship game – Michigan State vs. North Carolina ====
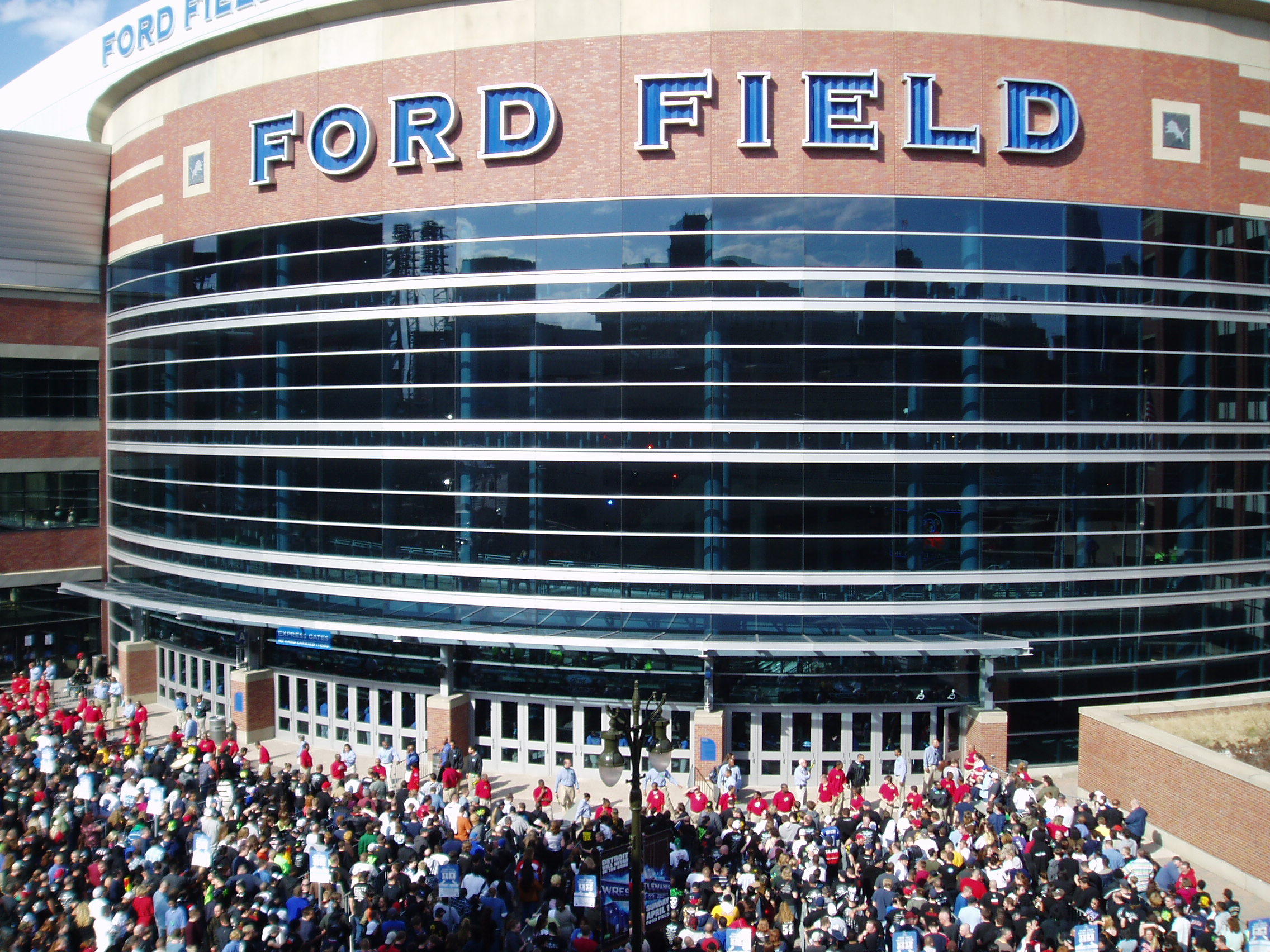
Ford Field was the host of the 2009 Final Four and championship game.

This 71st title game featured #1 seed North Carolina, which had a 4–4 record in the finals, versus #2 seed Michigan State, which had a 2–0 record going into the game. It was also a matchup featuring future Hall of Fame coach Tom Izzo, who guided Michigan State to the championship in 2000 and 5 trips to the Final Four, against current Hall of Famer Roy Williams, who won the title in 2005 and reached 7 Final Fours.

To celebrate the 30th anniversary of the 1979 national title game between Michigan State and Indiana State, Hall of Fame players Earvin "Magic" Johnson and Larry Bird, who had played against each other, presented the game ball at the 2009 NCAA national championship game Monday night.

The game was a rematch of "BasketBowl II", of 2008's ACC-Big Ten Challenge, won by the Tar Heels 98–63. That game was also played at Ford Field.

CBS

April 6
9:21 EDT

Box score

#1 North Carolina 89, #2 Michigan State 72
Scoring by half: 55–34, 34–38
| Pts: T. Lawson 21; Rebs: E. Davis – 8 Asts: T. Lawson – 6 | Pts: G. Suton – 17; Rebs: G. Suton – 11; Asts: K. Lucas – 7 |

Ford Field – Detroit, MI
Attendance: 72,922
Referees: Tom O'Neill, Curtis Shaw, Tony Greene

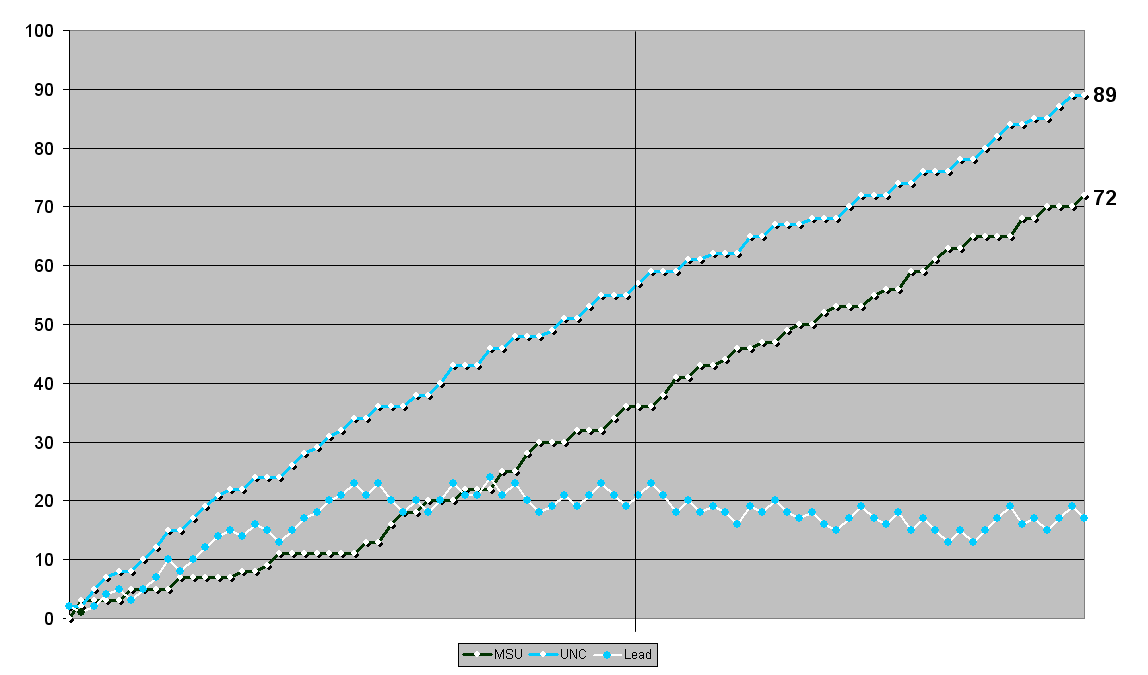
Running score of the championship game.

North Carolina, with a first bucket from Deon Thompson, took off and ran to a 21-point lead at the 10-minute mark. The lead grew to 24 with less than 5 minutes remaining in the first half, with most points coming from Wayne Ellington (15). The Spartans were behind 55–34 at the half, a tournament record lead for the Tar Heels. Goran Suton had the most points for Michigan State.

In the second half, Michigan State made a comeback to within 13 points of North Carolina with 4:56 to go in the game, but was unable to overcome the record 21 turnovers. Roy Williams and his Tar Heels defeated the Spartans 89–72 to take home his second trophy for the university. Ty Lawson set a record with 8 steals.

== All Tournament team ==
- Wayne Ellington, North Carolina (Most Outstanding Player)
- Tyler Hansbrough, North Carolina
- Ty Lawson, North Carolina
- Kalin Lucas, Michigan State
- Goran Suton, Michigan State

== Tournament notes ==
- Largest tournament point differential (+121) by the champion since 1996 (a new record was set in 2016 after the Villanova Wildcats defeated the North Carolina Tar Heels).
- Highest attended National semifinal Games (72,456) in Final Four history, breaking the old record of 64,959 (a new record was set in 2014).
- Highest attended National Championship Game (72,922) in Final Four history breaking the old record of 64,959 (a new record was set in 2014).
- Highest total Final Four attendance (145,378) ever breaking the old record of 129,918 (a new record was set in 2014).
- Roy Williams is one of four active coaches to win multiple titles. Billy Donovan, Mike Krzyzewski and Jim Calhoun are the three other coaches.
- Nielsen ratings for the Championship Game were down 7% to 11.9/19 versus a 12.8/20 the previous year. The entire tournament averaged a 6.3/13, a 5% increase.
- Blake Griffin of Oklahoma was the winner of the John Wooden Award, presented by the Los Angeles Athletic Club on Friday, April 10 in Los Angeles.
- 708,296 fans in attendance over the course of 35 sessions.

== Record by conference ==
| Conference | # of Bids | Record | Win % | R32 | S16 | E8 | F4 | CG |
|---|---|---|---|---|---|---|---|---|
| ACC | 7 | 9–6 | .600 | 3 | 2 | 1 | 1 | 1 |
| Big East | 7 | 17–7 | .708 | 6 | 5 | 4 | 2 | – |
| Big Ten | 7 | 9–7 | .563 | 4 | 2 | 1 | 1 | 1 |
| Big 12 | 6 | 11–6 | .647 | 6 | 3 | 2 | – | – |
| Pac-10 | 6 | 6–6 | .500 | 5 | 1 | – | – | – |
| Atlantic 10 | 3 | 3–3 | .500 | 2 | 1 | – | – | – |
| SEC | 3 | 1–3 | .250 | 1 | – | – | – | – |
| Horizon | 2 | 1–2 | .333 | 1 | – | – | – | – |
| Mountain West | 2 | 0–2 | .000 | – | – | – | – | – |
| C–USA | 1 | 2–1 | .667 | 1 | 1 | – | – | – |
| MAAC | 1 | 1–1 | .500 | 1 | – | – | – | – |
| Ohio Valley | 1 | 1–1* | .500 | – | – | – | – | – |
| Sun Belt | 1 | 1–1 | .500 | 1 | – | – | – | – |
| WCC | 1 | 2–1 | .667 | 1 | 1 | – | – | – |

*Morehead State won the Opening Round game.

The America East, Atlantic Sun, Big Sky, Big South, Big West, CAA, Ivy, MAC, MEAC, MVC, NEC, Patriot, Southland, SoCon, SWAC, Summit, and WAC conferences all went 0–1.

The columns R32, S16, E8, F4, and CG respectively stand for the Round of 32, Sweet Sixteen, Elite Eight, Final Four, and championship Game.

== Media ==
=== Television ===
Once again, except for the play-in game, which was telecast on ESPN, CBS and CBS College Sports Network served as broadcasters on television for the tournament. The only change from past years at the Final Four was that Jim Nantz worked with Clark Kellogg in the color commentary position instead of Billy Packer, who left CBS in July 2008.

- Studio: Greg Gumbel, Greg Anthony and Seth Davis
- Jim Nantz and Clark Kellogg and Tracy Wolfson (she was only used as a backstage reporter for the Final Four and NCAA Championship game) – First & Second Round at Greensboro, North Carolina; South Regional at Memphis, Tennessee; Final Four at Detroit, Michigan
- Dick Enberg or Carter Blackburn and Jay Bilas – Blackburn Thursday afternoon; Enberg Thursday night, First & Second round at Philadelphia, Pennsylvania; West Regional at Glendale, Arizona
- Verne Lundquist and Bill Raftery – First & Second Round at Dayton, Ohio; East Regional at Boston, Massachusetts
- Gus Johnson and Len Elmore – First & Second Round at Minneapolis, Minnesota; Midwest Regional at Indianapolis, Indiana
- Kevin Harlan and Dan Bonner – First & Second Round at Portland, Oregon
- Ian Eagle and Jim Spanarkel – First & Second Round at Miami, Florida
- Craig Bolerjack and Bob Wenzel – First & Second Round at Boise, Idaho
- Tim Brando and Mike Gminski – First & Second Round at Kansas City, Missouri

For the play-in game in Dayton, ESPN had Brent Musburger, Steve Lavin and Erin Andrews working as the announcers.

Some CBS affiliates put additional game broadcasts on digital subchannels, or, as in the following two instances, on other stations:

- WOIO and WUAB (Raycom Media duopoly): On March 20, WOIO aired Ohio State vs. Siena, while Cleveland State vs. Wake Forest was on WUAB at the same time. The Cleveland area has a substantial number of OSU alumni, and Mansfield, although part of the Cleveland market, is equidistant to both Columbus and Cleveland.
- KOTV and KQCW (Griffin Media duopoly): Also on March 20, KOTV aired Oklahoma State vs. Tennessee; at the same time, Kansas vs. North Dakota State was on KQCW. The reason for this simulcast is that part of the Tulsa market includes Coffeyville and other communities at the southern end of Kansas.

=== Radio ===
Westwood One was once again the radio home for the tournament.

==== Opening Round Game ====
- Marc Vandermeer and Steve Lappas – at Dayton, Ohio

==== First/Second Round ====
- Bill Rosinski and Kyle Macy – at Greensboro, North Carolina
- Kevin Kugler and Pete Gillen – at Kansas City, Missouri
- Wayne Larrivee and John Thompson – at Philadelphia, Pennsylvania
- Dave Sims and P.J. Carlesimo – at Portland, Oregon
- Ted Robinson and Bill Frieder – at Boise, Idaho
- Mark Champion and Kelly Tripucka – at Dayton, Ohio
- Tom McCarthy and Kevin Grevey – at Miami, Florida
- Brad Sham and Reid Gettys – at Minneapolis, Minnesota

==== Regionals ====
- Kevin Kugler and John Thompson – East Regional at Boston, Massachusetts
- Ian Eagle and Pete Gillen – Midwest Regional at Indianapolis, Indiana
- Kevin Harlan and P.J. Carlesimo – South Regional at Memphis, Tennessee
- Wayne Larrivee and Bill Frieder – West Regional at Glendale, Arizona

==== Final Four ====
- Kevin Kugler, John Thompson and Bill Raftery – at Detroit, Michigan

=== International broadcasters ===
- Canada: CBC Television, uses the CBS broadcast and commentators, the CBC personalities, themes and graphics.
- Australia: One HD / ESPN Australia, uses the CBS broadcast and commentators.
- Brazil: ESPN Brasil, uses the CBS broadcast.
- Europe, North Africa and Middle East: ESPN America
- Philippines: Live/delayed on Basketball TV, and recorded on C/S9; uses the CBS broadcast and commentators.

Yahoo! Sports and NCAA.com also broadcast the entire tournament live for free on the internet.

== See also ==
- 2009 NCAA Division II men's basketball tournament
- 2009 NCAA Division III men's basketball tournament
- 2009 NCAA Division I women's basketball tournament
- 2009 NCAA Division II women's basketball tournament
- 2009 NCAA Division III women's basketball tournament
- 2009 National Invitation Tournament
- 2009 Women's National Invitation Tournament
- 2009 NAIA Division I men's basketball tournament
- 2009 NAIA Division II men's basketball tournament
- 2009 NAIA Division I women's basketball tournament
- 2009 NAIA Division II women's basketball tournament
- 2009 College Basketball Invitational
- 2009 CollegeInsider.com Postseason Tournament
- 2008–09 NCAA Division I men's basketball season
