= 2008–09 Western Kentucky Hilltoppers basketball team =

American college basketball season

2008–09 Western Kentucky Hilltoppers basketball

Sun Belt Conference tournament Champion Sun Belt Conference East Division Champion

NCAA Tournament, second round
- Conference: Sun Belt Conference
- East Division
- Record: 25–9 (15–3 Sun Belt)
- Head coach: Ken McDonald
- Assistant coach: Ray Harper
- Home arena: E. A. Diddle Arena

2008–09 Sun Belt Conference men's basketball standings
	Conf.				Overall
Team	W		L	PCT	W		L	PCT
East
Western Kentucky †	15	–	3	.833	25	–	9	.735
Troy	14	–	4	.778	19	–	13	.594
Middle Tennessee	10	–	8	.556	18	–	14	.563
South Alabama	10	–	8	.556	20	–	13	.606
Florida International	7	–	11	.389	13	–	20	.394
Florida Atlantic	2	–	16	.111	6	–	26	.188
West
Arkansas-Little Rock	15	–	3	.833	23	–	8	.742
North Texas	11	–	7	.611	20	–	12	.625
Denver	9	–	9	.500	15	–	16	.484
Louisiana–Lafayette	7	–	11	.389	10	–	20	.333
Louisiana–Monroe	6	–	12	.333	10	–	20	.333
New Orleans	6	–	12	.333	11	–	19	.367
Arkansas State	5	–	13	.278	13	–	17	.433
† 2009 Sun Belt Conference tournament winner Rankings from AP Poll

The 2008–09 Western Kentucky Hilltoppers men's basketball team represented Western Kentucky University during the 2008–09 NCAA Division I men's basketball season. The Hilltoppers were led by first year head coach Ken McDonald and team captain Orlando Mendez-Valdez. They played their home games at E. A. Diddle Arena and were members of the East Division of the Sun Belt Conference.

They finished the season 25–9 and 15–3 in Sun Belt Play to finish first in the East Division. One of the highlights of the season was a victory over in-state rival, 3rd ranked Louisville. The Hilltoppers won the Sun Belt Basketball tournament and earned the conference's automatic bid to the NCAA tournament. They defeated Illinois in the first round before falling tenth ranked Gonzaga. Mendez-Valdez was SBC Player of the year and was joined by A.J. Slaughter on the All SBC team. Slaughter was SBC Tournament Most Valuable Player and was joined on the All-Tournament team by Mendaz-Valdez and Sergio Kerusch.

== Schedule ==
Date time, TV	Rank^{#}	Opponent^{#}	Result	Record	Site city, state
Regular Season
11/15/2008*		at Houston	L 64–73	0–1	Hofheinz Pavilion (3,217); Houston, TX
11/18/2008*		Campbellsville	W 62–48	1–1	E. A. Diddle Arena (3,528); Bowling Green, KY
11/22/2008*		at Murray State	L 61–89	1–2	CFSB Center (7,038); Murray, KY
11/26/2008*		Southern Illinois	W 79–70	2–2	E. A. Diddle Arena (3,948); Bowling Green, KY
11/30/2008*		vs. No. 3 Louisville	W 68–54	3–2	Sommet Center (8,193); Nashville, TN
12/2/2008*		Georgia	W 67–63	4–2	E. A. Diddle Arena (7,086); Bowling Green, KY
12/6/2008*		at Tulane	W 82–67	5–2	Devlin Fieldhouse (1,455); New Orleans, LA
12/13/2008*		at Evansville	L 40–72	5–3	Roberts Municipal Stadium (7,746); Evansville, IN
12/18/2008		at South Alabama	W 69–66	6–3 (1–0)	Mitchell Center (4,360); Mobile, AL
12/21/2008*		Alabama A&M	W 83–60	7–3	E. A. Diddle Arena (3,083); Bowling Green, KY
12/28/2008*		vs. Florida State; Orange Bowl Basketball Classic	L 69–82	7–4	BankAtlantic Center (9,045); Sunrise, FL
1/1/2009		Troy	W 99–76	8–4 (2–0)	E. A. Diddle Arena (3,778); Bowling Green, KY
1/3/2009		Arkansas–Little Rock	W 79–47	9–4 (3–0)	E. A. Diddle Arena (4,538); Bowling Green, KY
1/5/2009*		at Mississippi State	L 67–95	9–5	Humphrey Coliseum (7,674); Starkville, MS
1/8/2009		at FIU	L 79–81	9–6 (3–1)	Ocean Bank Convocation Center (609); University Park, FL
1/10/2009		at Florida Atlantic	W 78–57	10–6 (4–1)	FAU Arena (1,165); Boca Raton, FL
01/15/2009		Middle Tennessee	W 63–61	11–6 (5–1)	E. A. Diddle Arena (5,142); Bowling Green, KY
01/17/2009		New Orleans	W 70–60	12–6 (6–1)	E. A. Diddle Arena (5,042); Bowling Green, KY
01/22/2009		Louisiana–Lafayette	W 73–68	13–6 (7–1)	E. A. Diddle Arena (4,814); Bowling Green, KY
01/24/2009		at Denver	L 74–78	13–7 (7–2)	Magness Arena (3,550); Denver, CO
01/31/2009		North Texas	W 71–67	14–7 (8–2)	E. A. Diddle Arena (5,689); Bowling Green, KY
02/2/2009		at Arkansas State	W 68–63	15–7 (9–2)	Convocation Center (5,091); Jonesboro, AR
02/5/2009		at ULM	W 64–55	16–7 (10–2)	Fant–Ewing Coliseum (847); Monroe, LA
02/07/2009		South Alabama	W 67–59	17–7 (11–2)	E. A. Diddle Arena (6,613); Bowling Green, KY
02/14/2009		at Troy	L 82–87	17–8 (11–3)	Sartain Hall (2,204); Troy, AL
2/19/2009		at Arkansas–Little Rock	W 78–69	18–8 (12–3)	Jack Stephens Center (5,012); Little Rock, AR
02/21/2009		FIU	W 79–66	19–8 (13–3)	E. A. Diddle Arena (7,117); Bowling Green, KY
02/26/2009		Florida Atlantic	W 87–67	20–8 (14–3)	E. A. Diddle Arena (6,413); Bowling Green, KY
02/28/2009		at Middle Tennessee	W 68–49	21–8 (15–3)	Murphy Center (5,128); Murfreesboro, TN
2009 Sun Belt Conference men's basketball tournament
03/08/2009	(1)	vs. (9) FIU; Second Round	W 66–48	22–8	Summit Arena (1,000); Hot Springs, AR
03/09/2009	(1)	vs. (4) North Texas; Semifinals	W 77–70	23–8	Summit Arena (3,504); Hot Springs, AR
03/10/2009	(1)	vs. (6) South Alabama; Championship Game	W 64–56	24–8	Summit Arena (3,493); Hot Springs, AR
2009 NCAA Division I men's basketball tournament
03/19/2009*	(12 S)	vs. (5 S) Illinois; First Round	W 76–72	25–8	Rose Garden Arena (17,169); Portland, OR
03/21/2009*	(12 S)	vs. (4 S) No. 10 Gonzaga; Second Round	L 81–83	25–9	Rose Garden Arena (18,794); Portland, OR
*Non-conference game. ^{#}Rankings from AP Poll (S) during NCAA Tournament is seed with Region. (#) Tournament seedings in parentheses.
