= 2008–09 Louisiana–Lafayette Ragin' Cajuns men's basketball team =

American college basketball season

2008–09 Louisiana–Lafayette Ragin' Cajuns men's basketball
- Conference: Sun Belt Conference
- West Division
- Record: 13–17 (10–8 Sun Belt)
- Head coach: Robert Lee (5th season)
- Assistant coaches: Byron Starks Jr.; Jai Steadman; Rick LeBato
- Home arena: Cajundome

2008–09 Sun Belt Conference men's basketball standings
	Conf.				Overall
Team	W		L	PCT	W		L	PCT
East
Western Kentucky †	15	–	3	.833	25	–	9	.735
Troy	14	–	4	.778	19	–	13	.594
Middle Tennessee	10	–	8	.556	18	–	14	.563
South Alabama	10	–	8	.556	20	–	13	.606
Florida International	7	–	11	.389	13	–	20	.394
Florida Atlantic	2	–	16	.111	6	–	26	.188
West
Arkansas-Little Rock	15	–	3	.833	23	–	8	.742
North Texas	11	–	7	.611	20	–	12	.625
Denver	9	–	9	.500	15	–	16	.484
Louisiana–Lafayette	7	–	11	.389	10	–	20	.333
Louisiana–Monroe	6	–	12	.333	10	–	20	.333
New Orleans	6	–	12	.333	11	–	19	.367
Arkansas State	5	–	13	.278	13	–	17	.433
† 2009 Sun Belt Conference tournament winner Rankings from AP Poll

The 2008–09 Louisiana–Lafayette Ragin' Cajuns men's basketball team represented the University of Louisiana at Lafayette during the 2008–09 NCAA Division I men's basketball season. The Ragin' Cajuns, led by fifth-year head coach Robert Lee, played their home games at the Cajundome and were members of the West Division of the Sun Belt Conference. They finished the season 10–20, 7–11 in Sun Belt play to finish in fourth place in the Western Divisional standings. They competed in the 2009 Sun Belt Conference men's basketball tournament where they lost in the Quarterfinals to FIU. They were not invited to any other post-season tournament.

== Roster ==
2008–09 Louisiana–Lafayette Ragin' Cajuns Men's Basketball Roster
Number	Name	Position	Height	Year	Hometown	Previous School
0	Colby Baptiste	Forward	6–9	Sophomore	Lafayette, Louisiana	Teurlings Catholic HS
1	Tyren Johnson	Forward	6–8	Junior	Edgard, Louisiana	West St. John HS
2	Randell Daigle	Guard	5–10	Junior	Lafayette, Louisiana	Northside HS
3	Lamar Roberson	Forward	6–8	Junior	Baton Rouge, Louisiana	Southern Lab
4	Phillip Jones	Guard	6–0	Redshirt Freshman	Maurice, Louisiana	North Vermilion HS
5	Brandon Dison	Guard	6–6	Junior	Westfield, Texas	Westfield HS
11	Corey Bloom	Guard	6–6	Junior	New Orleans, Louisiana	Brother Martin HS
12	Willie Lago	Guard	6–1	Junior	Reserve, Louisiana	East St. John HS
13	Sutton Yanosky	Guard	6–0	Redshirt Freshman	Mandeville, Louisiana	Fontainebleau HS
15	David Tanner	Forward	6–5	Sophomore	Athens, Georgia	Westminster Christian
20	Damon Forest	Guard	6–3	Junior	Central, Louisiana	Central HS
21	Emmanuel Adeife	Forward	6–10	Senior	Miami, Florida	Dillard
22	Travis Bureau	Guard	6–7	Sophomore	St. Amant, Louisiana	St. Amant HS
23	La'Ryan Gary	Guard/Forward	6–7	Junior	Carencro, Louisiana	Carencro HS
25	Stephen Dees	Guard	6–1	Junior	Dayton, Ohio	Chaminade Julienne HS
33	Chris Gradnigo	Guard	6–7	Sophomore	Lake Charles, Louisiana	LaGrange HS
41	Jeremy Barr	Forward	6–9	Junior	Andros, Bahamas	Westbury Christian
42	Courtney Wallace	Forward/Center	6–8	Junior	Baton Rouge, Louisiana	Woodlawn HS
55	Ryan McCoy	Guard	6–0	Junior	Houston, Texas	Madison HS
