= 2009 Sun Belt Conference men's basketball tournament =

- Classification: Division I
- Season: 2008–09
- Teams: 13
- Site: Summit Arena; Hot Springs, Arkansas
- Champions: WKU (7th title)
- Winning coach: Ken McDonald (1st title)
- MVP: A. J. Slaughter (WKU)
- Television: ESPN Regional Television, ESPN2

2008–09 Sun Belt Conference men's basketball standings
	Conf.				Overall
Team	W		L	PCT	W		L	PCT
East
Western Kentucky †	15	–	3	.833	25	–	9	.735
Troy	14	–	4	.778	19	–	13	.594
Middle Tennessee	10	–	8	.556	18	–	14	.563
South Alabama	10	–	8	.556	20	–	13	.606
Florida International	7	–	11	.389	13	–	20	.394
Florida Atlantic	2	–	16	.111	6	–	26	.188
West
Arkansas-Little Rock	15	–	3	.833	23	–	8	.742
North Texas	11	–	7	.611	20	–	12	.625
Denver	9	–	9	.500	15	–	16	.484
Louisiana–Lafayette	7	–	11	.389	10	–	20	.333
Louisiana–Monroe	6	–	12	.333	10	–	20	.333
New Orleans	6	–	12	.333	11	–	19	.367
Arkansas State	5	–	13	.278	13	–	17	.433
† 2009 Sun Belt Conference tournament winner Rankings from AP Poll

The 2009 Sun Belt Conference men's basketball tournament was held March 4–10, 2009. The first round was held at campus sites and all subsequent rounds took place in Hot Springs, Arkansas at the Summit Arena. The semifinals were televised by ESPN Regional Television. The Sun Belt Conference Championship Game was televised by ESPN2.

The tournament was won by the WKU Hilltoppers, in front of a crowd of 3,493.

== Bracket ==
First round Wednesday, March 4
8	Louisiana-Lafayette	69
9	Florida International	71
4	North Texas	79
13	Florida Atlantic	73
5	Middle Tennessee St	69
12	Arkansas State	62
6	South Alabama	62
11	New Orleans	60
7	Denver	66
10	Louisiana-Monroe	57

Second round Sunday, March 8
1	WKU	66
9	Florida International	48
4	North Texas	88
5	Middle Tennessee St	79
3	Troy	75
6	South Alabama	78
2	Arkansas-Little Rock	58
7	Denver	55

Semifinals; Monday, March 9
1	WKU	77
4	North Texas	70
6	South Alabama	54
2	Arkansas-Little Rock	44

Championship game Tuesday, March 10
1	WKU	64
6	South Alabama	56

Asterisk denotes game ended in overtime.
