= 2008–09 Binghamton Bearcats men's basketball team =

American college basketball season

2008–09 Binghamton Bearcats men's basketball
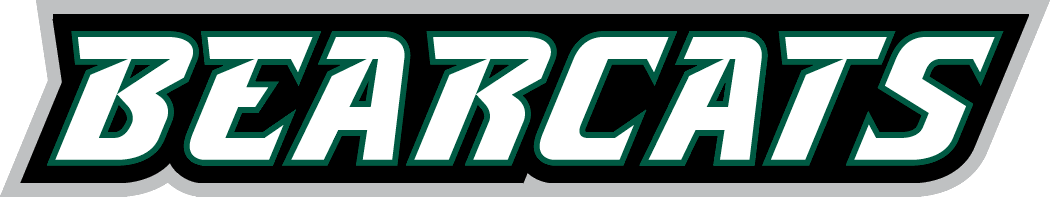

America East regular season co-champions America East tournament champions

NCAA tournament, first round
- Conference: America East Conference
- Record: 23–9 (13–3 America East)
- Head coach: Kevin Broadus (2nd season)
- Assistant coaches: Marc Hsu; Julius Allen; Mark Macon
- Home arena: Binghamton University Events Center

2008–09 America East men's basketball standings
	Conf.				Overall
Team	W		L	PCT	W		L	PCT
Binghamton †	13	–	3	.813	23	–	9	.719
Vermont	13	–	3	.813	24	–	9	.727
Boston University	11	–	5	.688	17	–	13	.567
New Hampshire	8	–	8	.500	14	–	16	.467
Stony Brook	8	–	8	.500	16	–	14	.533
UMBC	7	–	9	.438	15	–	17	.469
Albany	6	–	10	.375	15	–	16	.484
Maine	4	–	12	.250	9	–	21	.300
Hartford	2	–	14	.125	7	–	26	.212
† America East tournament winner As of March 20, 2009; Rankings from AP Poll

The 2008–09 Binghamton Bearcats men's basketball team represented Binghamton University during the 2008–09 NCAA Division I men's basketball season. The Bearcats, led by second-year head coach Kevin Broadus, played their home games at the Binghamton University Events Center in Vestal, New York as members of the America East Conference.

The team finished with a record of 23–9, which tied a school record for wins in a season, and tied for first in America East play with a 13–3 conference record. The Bearcats clinched a share of their first America East regular season title and earned the top seed in the America East tournament. The Bearcats defeated 9th–seeded Hartford and 4th–seeded New Hampshire, before punching their ticket to their first NCAA tournament by beating 6th–seed UMBC in front of a sold-out Events Center. The Bearcats were given the #15 seed in the East Region, slated to face off against the 3–time national champion Duke. CBS nationally televised the game as the late-night headliner, but the Bearcat's historic season ended as they lost 86–62. Head coach Kevin Broadus was named the conference's coach of the year for his efforts in the Bearcats run to the NCAA tournament.

== Previous season ==
In Kevin Broadus' first season as Binghamton's head coach, the Bearcats showed signs of improvements that they previously had not under the leadership of Al Walker. The team finished 14–16, tied for fourth in the America East with a 9–7 conference record, a 3–game improvement from the previous season. The Bearcats earned the fifth seed in the 2009 America East men's basketball tournament, where they lost to fourth-seeded Vermont in the quarterfinals.

== Roster ==
2020–21 Binghamton Bearcats men's basketball team
Players
Coaches
}

Pos.	#	Name	Height	Weight	Year	Previous school	Hometown
F	1	Moussa Camara	6 ft 6 in (1.98 m)	185 lb (84 kg)	So	Stoneridge Prep	Paris, France
F	2	D.J. Rivera	6 ft 4 in (1.93 m)	190 lb (86 kg)	Jr	Neumann-Goretti HS; Saint Joseph's	Philadelphia, PA
G	3	Malik Alvin	6 ft 0 in (1.83 m)	175 lb (79 kg)	Jr	Simon Gratz HS; UTEP	Philadelphia, PA
G	4	Brandon Herbert	6 ft 0 in (1.83 m)	180 lb (82 kg)	So	McDonogh School	Baltimore, MD
G	15	David Fine	6 ft 1 in (1.85 m)	180 lb (82 kg)	Jr	Christian Brothers Academy; Jacksonville	Syracuse, NY
F	22	Sean Watson	6 ft 5 in (1.96 m)	185 lb (84 kg)	Sr	Sheepshead Bay HS; Howard CC	Brooklyn, NY
G	24	Matt Mullins	6 ft 1 in (1.85 m)	170 lb (77 kg)	Fr	Chenango Valley HS	Binghamton, NY
G	25	Reggie Fuller	6 ft 6 in (1.98 m)	195 lb (88 kg)	Sr	Hightower HS; Angelina CC	Missouri City, TX
G	32	Tiki Mayben	6 ft 3 in (1.91 m)	180 lb (82 kg)	Jr	Troy HS; UMass	Troy, NY
C	33	Kyrie Sutton	6 ft 10 in (2.08 m)	265 lb (120 kg)	Fr	Boys and Girls HS	Brooklyn, NY
F	34	Chretien Lukasa	6 ft 2 in (1.88 m)	215 lb (98 kg)	So	Eastern Commerce CI	Toronto, Canada
F	50	Jaan Montgomery	6 ft 11 in (2.11 m)	290 lb (132 kg)	Sr	Waterloo CI	Waterloo, Canada

Head coach

- Kevin Broadus (Bowie State)

Assistant coach(es)

- Marc Hsu (Cabrini College)
- Julius Allen (Southern Nazarene)
- Mark Macon (Temple)

Legend

- (C) Team captain
- (S) Suspended
- (I) Ineligible
- (W) Walk-on
- Injured
- Current redshirt

Roster
Last update: February 9, 2021

== Schedule ==
Date time, TV	Rank^{#}	Opponent^{#}	Result	Record	Site (attendance) city, state
Non-conference regular season
November 17, 2008*		Mansfield	W 80–62	1–0	Binghamton University Events Center (3,461); Vestal, NY
November 19, 2008*		at George Washington	L 57–71	1–1	Charles E. Smith Center (2,650); Washington D.C.
November 25, 2008*		at Central Connecticut	L 51–76	1–2	William H. Detrick Gymnasium (1,673); New Britain, CT
November 29, 2008*		Utah Valley	W 73–66	2–2	Binghamton University Events Center (2,783); Vestal, NY
December 1, 2008*		at Quinnipiac	W 74–58	3–2	TD Banknorth Sports Center (898); Hamden, CT
December 6, 2008*		at Rutgers	W 66–56	4–2	Louis Brown Athletic Center (4,076); Piscataway, NJ
December 9, 2008*		at Bucknell	L 60–63	4–3	Sojka Pavilion (1,244); Lewisburg, PA
December 20, 2008*		Manhattan	L 80–86	4–4	Binghamton University Events Center (3,338); Vestal, NY
December 23, 2008*		Rider	W 69–58	5–4	Binghamton University Events Center (2,721); Vestal, NY
December 27, 2008*		at Tulane	W 74–73	6–4	Avron B. Fogelman Arena (1,104); New Orleans, LA
December 30, 2008*		Marist	W 73–71	7–4	Binghamton University Events Center (3,190); Vestal, NY
America East Regular Season
January 3, 2009		at Maine	W 70–62	8–4 (1–0)	Alfond Arena (1,142); Orono, ME
January 5, 2009		Stony Brook	W 67–60	9–4 (2–0)	Binghamton University Events Center (2,709); Vestal, NY
January 8, 2009		Vermont	W 91–83 ^{OT}	10–4 (3–0)	Binghamton University Events Center (3,404); Vestal, NY
January 10, 2009*		at Utah Valley	L 70–80	10–5	McKay Events Center (2,165); Orem, UT
January 14, 2009		at Albany	L 66–72	10–6 (3–1)	SEFCU Arena (3,409); Albany, NY
January 17, 2009		Boston University	L 64–81	10–7 (3–2)	Binghamton University Events Center (4,128); Vestal, NY
January 19, 2009		Hartford	W 66–59	11–7 (4–2)	Binghamton University Events Center (2,926); Vestal, NY
January 22, 2009		at New Hampshire	W 60–47	12–7 (5–2)	Lundholm Gym (915); Durham, NH
January 28, 2009		at UMBC	L 78–84	12–8 (5–3)	RAC Arena (1,852); Catonsville, MD
January 31, 2009		Maine	W 83–77	13–8 (6–3)	Binghamton University Events Center (4,923); Vestal, NY
February 4, 2009		at Vermont	W 85–83	14–8 (7–3)	Patrick Gym (2,822); Burlington, VT
February 7, 2009		at Stony Brook	W 63–61 ^{OT}	15–8 (8–3)	Pritchard Gymnasium (1,680); Stony Brook, NY
February 9, 2009		Albany	W 88–75	16–8 (9–3)	Binghamton University Events Center (5,142); Vestal, NY
February 14, 2009		at Boston University	W 60–59	17–8 (10–3)	Case Gym (726); Boston, MA
February 18, 2009		at Hartford	W 62–44	18–8 (11–3)	Chase Arena at Reich Family Pavilion (811); West Hartford, CT
February 22, 2009		New Hampshire	W 70–69 ^{OT}	19–8 (12–3)	Binghamton University Events Center (5,222); Vestal, NY
February 26, 2009		UMBC	W 71–51	20–8 (13–3)	Binghamton University Events Center (5,222); Vestal, NY
America East tournament
March 7, 2009	(1)	vs. (9) Hartford; Quarterfinals	W 73–65	21–8	SEFCU Arena (3,473); Albany, NY
March 8, 2009	(1)	vs. (4) New Hampshire; Semifinals	W 72–67	22–8	SEFCU Arena (3,656); Albany, NY
March 14, 2009; ESPN2	(1)	vs. (6) UMBC; Final	W 61–51	23–8	Binghamton University Events Center (5,342); Vestal, NY
NCAA tournament
March 19, 2009*; 9:40 pm, CBS	(15 E)	vs. (2 E) No. 6 Duke; First Round	L 62–86	23–9	Greensboro Coliseum (20,001); Greensboro, NC
*Non-conference game. ^{#}Rankings from AP Poll. (#) Tournament seedings in parentheses. All times are in Eastern Time.
