= John Affleck =

John Affleck may refer to:

- John Affleck (coach) (born 1939), American former college sports coach
- John Affleck (politician) (1710–1776), British Tory politician
