= 2008–09 Albany Great Danes men's basketball team =

American college basketball season

2008–09 Albany Great Danes men's basketball
- Conference: America East Conference
- Record: 15–16 (6–10 America East)
- Head coach: Will Brown (8th season)
- Assistant coaches: Pat Filien; Jeremy Friel; Chad O'Donnell
- Home arena: SEFCU Arena

2008–09 America East men's basketball standings
	Conf.				Overall
Team	W		L	PCT	W		L	PCT
Binghamton †	13	–	3	.813	23	–	9	.719
Vermont	13	–	3	.813	24	–	9	.727
Boston University	11	–	5	.688	17	–	13	.567
New Hampshire	8	–	8	.500	14	–	16	.467
Stony Brook	8	–	8	.500	16	–	14	.533
UMBC	7	–	9	.438	15	–	17	.469
Albany	6	–	10	.375	15	–	16	.484
Maine	4	–	12	.250	9	–	21	.300
Hartford	2	–	14	.125	7	–	26	.212
† America East tournament winner As of March 20, 2009; Rankings from AP Poll

The 2008–09 Albany Great Danes men's basketball team represented the University at Albany, SUNY during the 2008–09 NCAA Division I men's basketball season. The Great Danes, led by eighth year head coach Will Brown, played their home games at SEFCU Arena as members of the America East Conference. They finished the season 15–16, 6–10 in America East play to finish in seventh place. As the seventh seed in the 2009 America East tournament, they upset second seed Vermont in the first round before losing to sixth seed UMBC in the semifinals.

== Previous season ==
The Great Danes finished the 2007–08 season 15–15, 10–6 in America East play to finish in a tie for second place. As the No. 3 seed in the 2008 America East tournament, they were defeated in the quarterfinals by Boston University.

== Schedule and results ==
Date time, TV	Rank^{#}	Opponent^{#}	Result	Record	High points	High rebounds	High assists	Site (attendance) city, state
Non-conference regular season
Nov 14, 2008*; 8:00 pm		No. 23 Villanova	L 60–78	0–1	13 – 2 tied	7 – Gifford	5 – Harris	The Pavilion (6,500); Villanova, PA
Nov 17, 2008*; 8:30 pm		at DePaul	L 64–75	0–2	16 – Johnson	9 – Johnson	7 – Johnson	Allstate Arena (3,502); Chicago, IL
Nov 19, 2008*; 7:00 pm		at Bryant	W 76–67	1–2	24 – Ambrose	8 – Ambrose	3 – 3 Tied	Chace Athletic Center (2,167); Smithfield, RI
Nov 22, 2008*; 7:00 pm		Central Connecticut State	W 68–67	2–2	24 – Ambrose	9 – Harris	4 – Ambrose	SEFCU Arena (3,241); Albany, NY
Nov 25, 2008*; 7:00 pm		at Columbia	W 66–49	3–2	15 – Hastings	7 – 2 tied	2 – 2 tied	Levien Gymnasium (1,010); New York, NY
Nov 29, 2008*; 7:00 pm		Penn	W 73–63	4–2	22 – Raffa	7 – 2 tied	4 – Ambrose	SEFCU Arena (2,427); Albany, NY
Dec 1, 2008*; 7:00 pm		Bryant	W 57–47	5–2	17 – Raffa	8 – McRae	5 – Raffa	SEFCU Arena (1,971); Albany, NY
Dec 6, 2008*; 7:00 pm		at Siena; Albany Cup	L 64–71	5–3	15 – Ambrose	9 – Ambrose	5 – Johnson	Times Union Center (13,251); Albany, NY
Dec 8, 2008*; 7:00 pm		at Lehigh	L 64–65	5–4	21 – Harris	7 – 2 tied	4 – 3 tied	Stabler Arena (638); Bethlehem, PA
Dec 13, 2008*; 7:00 pm		Canisius	W 74–46	6–4	15 – Ambrose	11 – Gifford	5 – Ambrose	SEFCU Arena (2,748); Albany, NY
Dec 20, 2008*; 2:00 pm		at Sacred Heart	W 60–59	7–4	15 – Raffa	8 – Raffa	4 – Johnson	William H. Pitt Center (314); Fairfield, CT
Dec 22, 2008*; 7:00 pm		at St. Francis-NY	W 68–56	8–4	14 – Raffa	6 – 3 tied	3 – Johnson	Generoso Pope Athletic Complex (407); Brooklyn, NY
Dec 30, 2008*; 9:00 pm, ESPNU		at Kansas	L 43–79	8–5	11 – Raffa	6 – 2 tied	4 – Connelly	Allen Fieldhouse (16,300); Lawrence, KS
American East regular season
Jan 3, 2009; 2:00 pm		at Hartford	L 54–64	8–6 (0–1)	17 – Harris	10 – Harris	3 – Ambrose	Chase Arena (1,469); West Hartford, CT
Jan 8, 2009; 7:00 pm		Boston University	W 62–61	9–6 (1–1)	19 – Ambrose	11 – Ambrose	4 – Allen	SEFCU Arena (2,237); Albany, NY
Jan 11, 2009; 1:00 pm		at Vermont	W 82–77	10–6 (2–1)	22 – Raffa	9 – Harris	5 – Ambrose	Patrick Gym (2,778); Burlington, VT
Jan 14, 2009; 7:00 pm		Binghamton	W 72–66	11–6 (3–1)	21 – Raffa	10 – Harris	3 – Raffa	SEFCU Arena (3,409); Albany, NY
Jan 17, 2009; 1:00 pm		at Maine	L 61–72	11–7 (3–2)	20 – Harris	9 – Connelly	4 – Ambrose	Alfond Arena (1,682); Orono, ME
Jan 23, 2009; 7:00 pm, MSG+		Stony Brook	L 45–58	11–8 (3–3)	14 – Harris	8 – Harris	3 – Raffa	SEFCU Arena (2,786); Albany, NY
Jan 25, 2009; 4:00 pm		UMBC	W 80–71	12–8 (4–3)	26 – Ambrose	9 – Connelly	3 – Raffa	SEFCU Arena (2,381); Albany, NY
Jan 28, 2009; 7:00 pm		Hartford	W 59–50	13–8 (5–3)	19 – Harris	10 – Harris	3 – Johnson	SEFCU Arena (1,012); Albany, NY
Feb 5, 2009; 7:00 pm		at Boston University	L 67–77	13–9 (5–4)	28 – Harris	12 – Connelly	3 – 2 tied	Agganis Arena (1,345); Boston, MA
Feb 7, 2009; 7:00 pm		Vermont; Big Purple Growl	L 70–79	13–10 (5–5)	29 – Ambrose	8 – Harris	5 – Johnson	SEFCU Arena (4,538); Albany, NY
Feb 9, 2009; 7:00 pm, MSG+		at Binghamton	L 75–88	13–11 (5–6)	28 – Ambrose	9 – Harris	7 – Johnson	Events Center (5,142); Vestal, NY
Feb 12, 2009; 7:00 pm, MSG		at Stony Brook	L 47–58	13–12 (5–7)	14 – Ambrose	8 – Ambrose	4 – Hastings	Pritchard Gymnasium (1,412); Stony Brook, NY
Feb 15, 2009; 2:00 pm		New Hampshire	L 59–78	13–13 (5–8)	18 – Harris	7 – Harris	3 – Raffa	SEFCU Arena (2,151); Albany, NY
Feb 22, 2009; 2:00 pm		Maine	W 80–69	14–13 (6–8)	27 – Ambrose	10 – Hastings	6 – Johnson	SEFCU Arena (2,463); Albany, NY
Feb 26, 2009; 7:00 pm		at New Hampshire	L 56–64	14–14 (6–9)	11 – Ambrose	6 – Johnson	3 – 2 tied	Lundholm Gym (1,355); Durham, NH
Mar 1, 2009; 2:00 pm		at UMBC	L 64–68	14–15 (6–10)	19 – Ambrose	11 – Harris	5 – Ambrose	Retriever Activities Center (3,069); Baltimore, MD
America East tournament
Mar 7, 2009; 12:00 pm	(7)	(2) Vermont; Quarterfinals	W 56–52 ^{OT}	15–15	18 – Harris	10 – 2 tied	5 – Johnson	SEFCU Arena (4,538); Albany, NY
Mar 8, 2009; 2:00 pm	(7)	(6) UMBC; Semifinals	L 58–64	15–16	21 – Ambrose	9 – Gifford	6 – Johnson	SEFCU Arena (3,656); Albany, NY
*Non-conference game. ^{#}Rankings from AP poll. (#) Tournament seedings in parentheses. All times are in Eastern Time.
