= Binghamton Bearcats men's basketball =

2026–27 Binghamton Bearcats men's basketball team
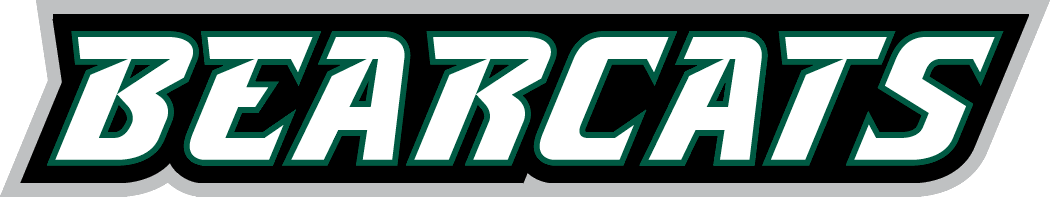
- University: Binghamton University
- First season: 1946–47; 80 years ago
- Head coach: Levell Sanders (5th season)
- Location: Vestal, New York
- Arena: Binghamton University Events Center (capacity: 5,322)
- Conference: America East
- Nickname: Bearcats
- Colors: Dark green, white, and black
- All-time record: 760–1,156 (.397)

NCAA Division I tournament appearances
- 2009

Conference tournament champions
- 2009

Conference regular-season champions
- 2009

Uniforms
Home	Away	Alternate

The Binghamton Bearcats men's basketball team represents Binghamton University and is located in Vestal, New York. The team currently competes in the America East Conference and plays its home games at the Binghamton University Events Center. Since becoming an NCAA Division I basketball program in 2001, the team has played in one NCAA Division I men's basketball tournament in 2009.

== History ==
Since the school's founding in 1946 until 1998 the Bearcats, originally known as the Colonials, participated in the NCAA as a Division III basketball program. From 1998 to 2001, the school was able to elevate its status as a Division II program and since has competed in the America East Conference at the Division I level. Prior to this, no school had elevated divisions faster than Binghamton.

=== Division I ===
Since moving to Division I in 2001, the Binghamton basketball team has seen rewarding successes and great disappointments. The Bearcats also have had wins against both Rutgers University and Tulane.

Following an unsuccessful 2007 season, head coach Al Walker, the only coach Binghamton had held in their Division I history, stepped down. Kevin Broadus, an assistant coach for Georgetown University was signed to fill Walker's position for the 2008 season. In his second season as head coach, Broadus took the Bearcats to their first regular season conference title in school history. Binghamton subsequently defeated UMBC 61–51 in the America East tournament championship Game to make their debut in the 2009 NCAA Tournament as a 15th seed. Binghamton would lose to second-seeded Duke in the first round that year.

Following the March Madness loss, a series of incidents began to make both local and regional headlines regarding academic and ethical violations by both players and coaches of the team. By the start of the 2009–10 campaign, six players had been kicked off the team from problems stemming back to the 2008–09 season, and head coach Kevin Broadus was suspended. Despite these handicaps, the 09–10 team led by interim head coach Mark Macon managed to finish fifth in conference play with a .500 record and recorded a 13–18 overall record. Towards the end of the basketball season the SUNY system produced an audit outlining the failures of the previous administration in running the basketball team. Due to these failures, Binghamton withdrew itself from the 2010 America East men's basketball tournament. Numerous coaches and Binghamton staffers were fired as a result of the scandal.

Since then, Binghamton has been barely competitive. The 2011–12 Bearcats set a school record after beginning the season on a 26-game losing streak and finishing 2–29 for the worst winning percentage in program history. The team has yet to record a winning record in either conference or overall play.

== NCAA tournament results ==
Binghamton has been to the tournament one time. Their combined record is 0–1.

Year	Seed	Round	Opponent	Result
2009	No. 15	First round	No. 2 Duke	L 86–62

== Records ==
Record table
Season	Coach	Overall	Conference	Standing	Postseason
Al Walker (America East) (2001–2007)
2001–02	Al Walker	9–19	6–10	6th	
2002–03	Al Walker	14–13	9–7	4th	
2003–04	Al Walker	14–16	10–8	5th	
2004–05	Al Walker	12–17	8–10	T–5th	
2005–06	Al Walker	16–13	12–4	2nd	
2006–07	Al Walker	13–16	6–10	T–6th	
Al Walker:		78–94 (.453)	51–49 (.510)		
Kevin Broadus (America East) (2007–2009)
2007–08	Kevin Broadus	14–16	9–7	T–4th	
2008–09	Kevin Broadus	23–9	13–3	T–1st	NCAA tournament first round
Kevin Broadus:		37–25 (.597)	22–10 (.688)		
Mark Macon (America East) (2009–2012)
2009–10	Mark Macon	13–18	8–8	5th	Ineligible
2010–11	Mark Macon	8–23	4–12	T–8th	
2011–12	Mark Macon	2–29	1–15	9th	
Mark Macon:		23–70 (.247)	13–35 (.271)		
Tommy Dempsey (America East) (2012–2021)
2012–13	Tommy Dempsey	3–27	1–15	9th	
2013–14	Tommy Dempsey	7–23	4–12	T–7th	
2014–15	Tommy Dempsey	6–26	5–11	7th	
2015–16	Tommy Dempsey	8–22	5–11	6th	
2016–17	Tommy Dempsey	12–20	3–13	T–8th	
2017–18	Tommy Dempsey	11–20	2–14	9th	
2018–19	Tommy Dempsey	10–23	5–11	7th	
2019–20	Tommy Dempsey	10–19	4–12	9th	
2020–21	Tommy Dempsey	4–14	4–10	9th	
Tommy Dempsey:		71–194 (.268)	33–109 (.232)		
Levell Sanders (America East) (2021–present)
2021–22	Levell Sanders	12–17	8–10	7th	
2022–23	Levell Sanders	13–18	8–8	T–4th	
2023–24	Levell Sanders	15–15	7–9	T–4th	
2024–25	Levell Sanders	15–17	7–9	5th	
2025–26	Levell Sanders	8–23	4–12	9th	
Levell Sanders:		63–90 (.412)	34–48 (.415)		
Total:		272–473 (.365)			
National champion Postseason invitational champion Conference regular season champion Conference regular season and conference tournament champion Division regular season champion Division regular season and conference tournament champion Conference tournament champion

== Head coaches ==
No.	Tenure	Coach	Years	Record	Pct.
1	1946–1947	Bert Broder	1	7–4	.636
2	1947–1951	Gene Welborn	4	37–46	.446
3	1951–1952	Richard Powell	1	5–18	.217
4	1952–1956	John Natale	4	12–57	.174
5	1956–1972	Frank Pollard	16	92–164	.359
6	1972–1983	John Affleck	11	100–158	.388
7	1983–1991	Dave Archer	8	87–118	.424
8	1991–1996	Dick Baldwin	5	82–51	.617
9	1996–2000	Jim Norris	4	52–53	.495
10	2000–2007	Al Walker	7	92–108	.460
11	2007–2009	Kevin Broadus	2	37–25	.597
12	2009–2012 (Note: Macon was named interim head coach of the Bearcats on October 14, 2009, after Kevin Broadus was placed on indefinite leave. He was named permanent head coach in February of 2011.)	Mark Macon	3	23–70	.247
13	2012–2021	Tommy Dempsey	9	71–194	.268
14	2021–present (Note: Sanders was initially named interim head coach, but was named permanent head coach in February 2022.)	Levell Sanders	5	63–90	.412
Totals		14 coaches	80 seasons	760–1,156	.397
Records updated through end of 2025–26 season Source
