= 1981 Maccabiah Games =

11th Edition of Maccabiah Games

11th Maccabiah
- Host city: Tel Aviv, Israel
- Nations: 35
- Debuting countries: Bermuda; Puerto Rico; New Zealand
- Athletes: 3,500
- Events: 31 sports
- Opening: July 7, 1981
- Closing: July 16, 1981, in Jerusalem; Israeli President Yitzhak Navon
- Torchbearer: Shlomo Glickstein
- Main venue: Ramat Gan Stadium

The 11th Maccabiah Games brought 3,450 athletes to Israel from 35 nations. The Opening Ceremony was held on July 7, 1981, before a crowd of 53,000 and Israeli Prime Minister Menachem Begin in Ramat Gan Stadium, with 3,500 Jewish athletes parading past him. Representative Jack Kemp (R; New York) and a supporter of Israel, marched with the United States team. Israel won the most medals (199), with 65 gold. The United States won 188 medals, 85 gold. South Africa, Britain, and Canada had the next-most total medals.

The 31-sports menu included rugby union, sailing and softball for the first time. New facilities for squash, wrestling, karate, and judo were introduced.

== History ==
The Maccabiah Games were first held in 1932. In 1961, they were declared a "Regional Sports Event" by, and under the auspices and supervision of, the International Olympic Committee. Among other Olympic and world champions, swimmer Mark Spitz won 10 Maccabiah gold medals before earning his first of nine Olympic gold medals.

== Notable competitors ==
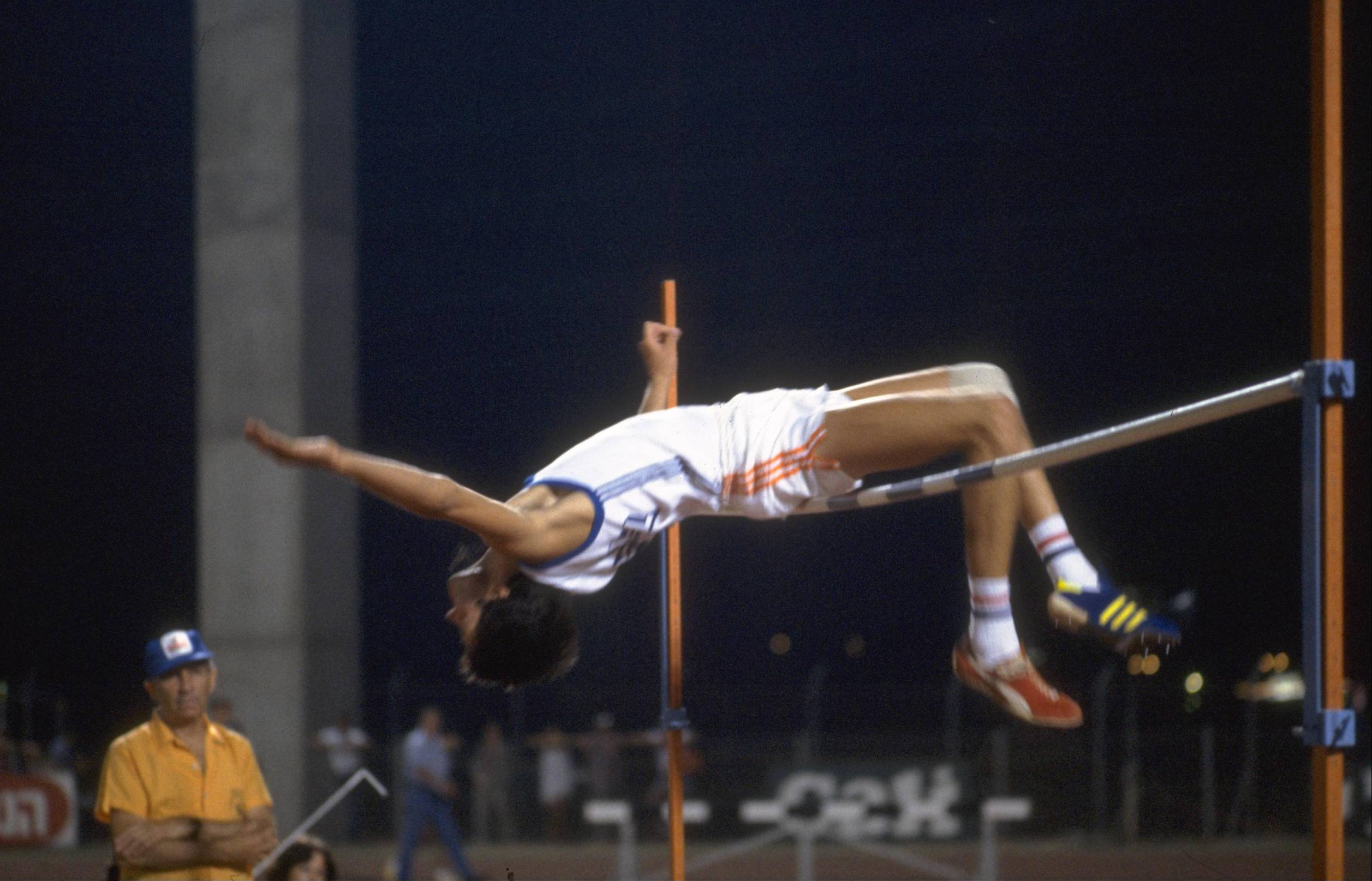
Israeli high jumping champion Gideon Harmat at the Games.

In gymnastics, American Mitch Gaylord won 6 gold medals; he later went on to win Olympic gold. American Olympian Abie Grossfeld was Team USA's coach.

American tennis players Brad Gilbert (in doubles, with Jon Levine, over fellow Americans Rick Meyer and Paul Bernstein), Andrea Leand, and Jeff Klaparda earned gold medals. Justin Gimelstob was an assistant coach of Team USA's tennis squad. Israeli Shlomo Glickstein, who carried the Maccabiah torch into the stadium and lit the ceremonial flame for the opening ceremony, won the men's singles in tennis (defeating Brad Gilbert), the first Israeli to win a Maccabiah tennis championship. Americans Dana Gilbert and Donna Rubin won the women's doubles.

In basketball, David Blatt, Danny Schayes (the first round draft pick of the NBA's Utah Jazz; carried the US flag in the opening ceremony), Al Walker, and Willie Sims won a gold medal with Team USA.

American fencers Paul Friedberg won a gold medal for the US in saber, Peter Schifrin won a silver medal in épée, and Elaine Cheris won an individual silver medal and a team gold medal in foil. British sabre fencer Paul Klenerman, who three years later fenced in the Olympics, also medaled. Canadian future Olympian Shelley Steiner won a gold medal.

In track and field, James Espir of Great Britain, who earlier that year had run a mile in 3 minutes 56.7 seconds, thereby becoming the fastest Jewish miler ever, won the 1500 metres and 5000 metres gold medals on successive days. Maya Kalle-Bentzur of Israel won the gold medal in the women's long jump, and Israeli future Olympian Yehuda Zadok won the gold medal in the 10,000 m race. Boris Djerassi of the United States won a gold medal in the hammer throw. Dave Edge of Canada, a long-distance runner who later competed in two Olympics, won a silver medal in the 10,000 m and a bronze medal in the mini-marathon. Canadian Gordon Orlikow, who later was a bronze medalist in the decathlon at the Pan American Games, won a bronze medal in the decathlon and a silver medal in the 110 m hurdles.

Swimming for Israel at the age of 14, Israeli future Olympian Hadar Rubinstein won gold medals in the women's 100 m butterfly, and in the women's 200 m butterfly. In swimming Lior Birkan won 3 gold and 2 silver medals. Mexican Helen Plaschinski won gold medals in swimming in the 100 and 200 m freestyle.

Mike Jeffries and Seth Roland represented the United States in soccer, winning a silver medal. Eli Ohana and Rafi Cohen represented Israel, winning a bronze medal.

In golf, American Corey Pavin won two gold medals.

Mark Berger, who three years later was to go on to win a silver medal in the Olympics, won a gold medal in wrestling, and a silver medal in judo. Canadian future Olympian Garry Kallos won two gold medals in wrestling, as did Canadian Olympian Howard Stupp.

In cricket, Alan Ezekowitz competed for England.

== Participating communities ==
A total of 35 nations participated, in 31 sports, at 58 locations throughout Israel. Israel won the most medals (199), with 65 gold. The United States won 188 medals, 85 gold. South Africa, Britain, and Canada had the next-most total medals.

The number in parentheses indicates the number of participants that community contributed.

- Argentina
- Australia
- Austria
- Belgium
- Bermuda
- Brazil
- Canada (110)
- Colombia
- Chile
- Denmark
- Ecuador
- Finland
- Great Britain
- Greece
- Guam
- India
- Israel (largest delegation)
- Italy
- Mexico
- Netherlands
- New Zealand
- Peru
- Puerto Rico
- Republic of Ireland
- Singapore
- South Africa
- Spain
- Sweden
- Switzerland
- Uruguay
- United States (372; 2nd-largest delegation)
- US Virgin Islands
- Venezuela
- West Germany
