= Maya Calé-Benzoor =

Israeli athletics competitor

Personal information
- Nationality: Israel
- Born: מיה קלה-בנצור; September 5, 1958 (age 67)

Sport
- Sport: Track & field
- Event(s): 100 metre dash; long jump; triple jump
- College team: Northern Arizona University

Achievements and titles
- Personal bests: 100 metre dash: 12.19 (1977); long jump: 6.27 (1984)
Medal record
Track and field
Representing Israel
Maccabiah Games
| Gold medal – first place | 1981 Israel | Women's long jump |
European Masters’ Championships
| Bronze medal – third place | 2001 | Women's triple jump |

Maya Calé-Benzoor (also "Kalle-Bentzur"; Hebrew: מיה קלה-בנצור; born September 5, 1958) is an Israeli former Olympic runner and long jumper.

Calé-Benzoor set the Israeli indoor long jump record (6.13 metres). She was a medalist at the 1973 Maccabiah Games, and at the 1981 Maccabiah Games she won the gold medal in the long jump. She won a bronze medal in the triple jump at the European Masters’ Championships in 2001.

She was born in Israel, and is Jewish.

== Education ==
Calé-Benzoor has a B.Ed. in Physical Education from Northern Arizona University (1984), where she set the school outdoor long jump record at 20 ft 6 in (6.25 m), NAU records in both the women's indoor and outdoor long (20' 6".00) and triple jumps (41' 3".75), and 40' 5".00 in the indoor triple jump. She placed third in the triple jump at the 1984 NCAA Division I Outdoor Track and Field Championships meet. Calé-Benzoor was an NCAA All American in 1984. In 1989 she was inducted into the NAU Athletic Hall of Fame.

She also has a Diploma in Physiotherapy Studies from Wingate Institute in Israel (1981), a master's degree in Sport Injury Rehabilitation from Georgia State University in Atlanta, Georgia (1990), and a PhD in Welfare and Health Studies from Haifa University.

== Running and long jump career ==
Her personal bests were 12.19 in the 100 metre dash (in 1977), and 6.27 metres in the long jump (in 1984). She set the Israeli indoor long jump record (6.13 metres).

Calé-Benzoor was a medalist at the 1973 Maccabiah Games. At the 1981 Maccabiah Games she won the gold medal in the long jump.

Calé-Benzoor competed for Israel at the 1984 Summer Olympics in Los Angeles, California at the age of 25. In the Women's 100 metres she came in 6th in Heat 5 with a time of 12.30 (missing qualifying for the next round by .04 seconds), and in the Women's Long Jump she came in 16th with a jump of 6.07 metres (missing qualifying for the next round by 0.12 metres).

She won a bronze medal in the triple jump at the European Masters’ Championships in 2001.

== Career after the Olympics ==
Calé-Benzoor worked as a physiotherapist and clinic manager in Phoenix, Arizona, and Atlanta, Georgia, and became the First Head of the Women's Sports Committee at the Maccabi Israel Center. She was the Deputy Manager of the Physiotherapy Department at Wingate Institute, and is now the Director of Sports Injury Rehabilitation at Wingate Institute and a lecturer in the Physiotherapy Program at Haifa University.
