= Paul Klenerman =

British fencer (born 1963)

Personal information
- Born: 26 March 1963 (age 63) London, England
- Height: 5 ft 10.5 in (179.1 cm)
- Weight: 154 lb (70 kg)

Sport
- Sport: Fencing
- Event: sabre
- College team: Oxford University
- Club: Salle Ganchev

Paul Klenerman (born 23 March 1963) is a British Olympic sabre fencer. He was born in London, England. Klenerman attended Clare College, Cambridge (1982; BA Medical Sciences), later fenced for Oxford University as a postgraduate.

Klenerman was the Great Britain Under-20 Fencing Champion. His fencing club is Salle Ganchev.

He is Jewish, and won the gold medal in sabre at the 1981 Maccabiah Games. In 1984, he won the sabre title at the British Fencing Championships at the age of 21. Klenerman also competed in the team sabre event at the 1984 Summer Olympics.

He is now a Professor of Immunology and medical researcher at Oxford University. He was elected a Fellow of the Academy of Medical Sciences in 2013.
