= 2008–09 Atlantic Coast Conference men's basketball season =

2008–09 Atlantic Coast Conference Men's Basketball Season
- League: NCAA Division I
- Sport: Basketball
- Duration: December 17, 2008 through March 8, 2009
- Teams: 12
- TV partner(s): Raycom, ESPN

Regular Season
- First place: North Carolina (13–3)
- Runners-Up: Wake Forest (11–5); Duke (11–5)
- Season MVP: Ty Lawson – UNC
- Top scorer: Tyler Hansbrough – UNC

Tournament
- Champions: Duke (17th)
- Runners-up: Florida State
- Finals MVP: Jon Scheyer

Basketball seasons
- 2007–08 2009–10

2008–09 ACC men's basketball standings
	Conf.				Overall
Team	W		L	PCT	W		L	PCT
No. 2 North Carolina	13	–	3	.813	34	–	4	.895
No. 6 Duke†	11	–	5	.688	30	–	7	.811
No. 12 Wake Forest	11	–	5	.688	24	–	7	.774
No. 16 Florida State	10	–	6	.625	25	–	10	.714
No. 24 Clemson	9	–	7	.563	23	–	9	.719
Boston College	9	–	7	.563	22	–	12	.647
Maryland	7	–	9	.438	21	–	14	.600
Virginia Tech	7	–	9	.438	19	–	15	.559
Miami (FL)	7	–	9	.438	19	–	13	.594
NC State	6	–	10	.375	16	–	14	.533
Virginia	4	–	12	.250	10	–	18	.357
Georgia Tech	2	–	14	.125	12	–	19	.387
† 2009 ACC tournament winner Rankings from AP Poll

The 2008–09 Atlantic Coast Conference men's basketball season was the 56th season for the league. North Carolina won the regular season crown while Duke won the ACC Tournament championship. The season saw Tyler Hansbrough set conference records in points (finishing with 2,872 for his career) and free throws made (982), while Miami's Jack McClinton ended his career as the conference's all time three-point marksman (.440 3-point FG%).

== Pre-season ==
On October 26, for the second-straight year North Carolina was the unanimous choice to finish first atop the Atlantic Coast Conference basketball race in voting by 40 media members at the league's annual Basketball Media Day. Duke was picked for second, while Wake Forest was voted third. Miami was fourth, followed by Clemson (fifth) and Virginia Tech (sixth).

Tyler Hansbrough was selected as pre-season ACC Player of the Year. Hansbrough averaged 22.6 points and 10.2 rebounds during the 2008–09 while earning first-team All-America honors for a third-straight year and consensus National Player of the Year honors. Wake Forest's Al-Farouq Aminu was the media's choice for the ACC pre-season Rookie of the Year.

Hansbrough and Boston College's Tyrese Rice were unanimous selections for the pre-season All-ACC team. Also named to the pre-season team were Miami's Jack McClinton, North Carolina's Ty Lawson and Gerald Henderson from Duke.

On November 13, the Los Angeles Athletic Club released their annual pre-season John R. Wooden Award watch list. The list is composed of 50 student athletes who, based on 2007-08's individual performance and team records, are the early frontrunners for college basketball's most coveted trophy. These top 50 candidates are returning players. Transfers, freshmen, and medical red-shirts are not eligible for this preseason list, but will be evaluated and considered for both the Midseason Top 30 list and the National Ballot. The ACC was represented by Boston College's Tyrese Rice, Duke's Gerald Henderson and Kyle Singler, Miami's Jack McClinton, North Carolina's Tyler Hansbrough, Wayne Ellington and Ty Lawson and Wake Forest's James Johnson. In the 2007–08 season, North Carolina's Hansbrough became the 12th ACC Player to earn Wooden National Player of the Year Award.

== Regular season ==
November
In November, nine ACC teams participated in eight regular season tournaments across the United States. Four ACC teams claimed championships.

Name	Dates	Num. teams	Championship
2k Sports Classic	Nov. 10–21	16	Duke 71 vs. Michigan 57
Charleston Classic	Nov. 14–16	8	Clemson 76 vs. Temple 72
Maui Invitational	Nov. 24–26	8	UNC 102 vs. Notre Dame 87
76 Classic	Nov. 27–30	8	Wake Forest 87 vs. Baylor 74

On November 11, Duke's Mike Krzyzewski moved into fifth place on the NCAA's all-time win list with his 805th career victory, a 97–54 win over Georgia Southern. On November 16, Virginia's Sylven Landesberg has 28 points, eight rebounds and eight assists as the Cavaliers beat VMI 107- 97. Landesberg's 28 points tied the second-highest total by an ACC freshman in his college debut. On November 21, With Maryland's 89–74 overtime win over Vermont, Gary Williams became only the third coach in league history to reach 400 career victories while coaching in the ACC. On November 21, Virginia's Sylven Landesberg netted a game-high 22 points in the Cavaliers' 68–66 win over Radford and became only the second freshman in ACC history to score 20 points in each of his first three games. Georgia Tech's Kenny Anderson scored 20 or more points in each of his first six games as a freshman in 1989–90. On November 30, Ty Lawson had 22 points as No. 1 North Carolina beat UNC-Asheville 116–48. The 68-point win margin was the largest in the ACC since a 75-point Maryland win over North Texas State (132–57) on Dec. 23, 1998, and tied for the seventh largest margin ever in ACC history.

December
On Wednesday, December 3, The ACC won its 10th-straight ACC–Big Ten Challenge by winning six of the eleven matchups. The series was highlighted by the 98–63 victory of No. 1 North Carolina over No. 12 Michigan State at Ford Field in what was dubbed as "Basketbowl II". On December 23, Boston College's Corey Raji was a perfect 12-for-12 from the field and scored a career-high 26 points in a 99–61 win over Maine. Raji's performance tied him for the second-best single game performance in ACC history. UNC's Brad Daugherty holds the ACC single-game field proficiency mark making all 13 of his shots versus UCLA back on Nov. 24, 1985. On December 30, NC State sophomore Tracy Smith came off the bench to score a career-high 31 points in the Wolfpack's 88–68 win over visiting Towson. Smith's 31 points set a school record and tied for the third-highest point total by a non-starter in ACC history.

January
On January 3, Jeff Teague had a game-high 30 points and James Johnson adds 22 points and 15 rebounds as sixth ranked Wake Forest snapped the nation's longest home court winning streak at 53 with a 94–87 win at BYU before a crowd of 26,096. On January 19, 16–0 Wake Forest took over the No. 1 spot in the AP poll and became the second ACC team to be ranked No. 1 in both the writers and coaches' polls. With the Deacons assuming the top spot in his 46th game as a head coach, Dino Gaudio became the third-fastest ACC head coach to have his team voted #1. On January 26, 18–1 Duke became the third ACC team this season to be ranked No. 1 in the AP poll, marking the second time in ACC annals and the fourth time in AP poll history that three different teams from the same conference have been ranked No. 1 in the same season. On January 31, In only the second-ever meeting between brothers in an ACC game, the Aminu brothers (Alade and Al-Farouq) combine for 27 points and 24 rebounds as Georgia Tech upsets No. 4 Wake Forest 76–74 in Atlanta. Al-Farouq had 17 points, 11 rebounds and five steals for the Deacons while Alade had 10 points, 13 rebounds for the Jackets.

February
On February 5, midway through the 2009 college basketball season, the Los Angeles Athletic Club's John R. Wooden Award Committee selected the top 30 candidates for the John R. Wooden Award, the nation's most coveted college basketball honor. The list is composed of the players who will compete for this season's player of the year award, the midseason list is based on individual player performance and team records during the first half of the season. The ACC was represent by North Carolina's Tyler Hansbrough, Ty Lawson, Duke's Gerald Henderson, Kyle Singler and Wake Forest's Jeff Teague. Teague was one of nine players who were selected for the midseason list who were not selected in the preseason.

On February 15, Ty Lawson had 21 points and four assists and Wayne Ellington added 15 points and 10 rebounds in North Carolina's 69–65 win at Miami. With the win, UNC's Roy Williams' became the winningest coach through his first 200 games at an ACC school. On February 21, Greivis Vasquez posted Maryland's first triple-double since 1987 as the Terps overcame a 16-point second-half deficit to beat No. 3 North Carolina 88–85 in overtime, ending the Tar Heels' 10-game win streak. In posting Maryland's third ever triple double, Vasquez had a career-high 35 points, 11 rebounds and 10 assists. Vasquez's 35 points set a record for the most ever by an ACC player recording a triple-double.

On February 22, In North Carolina's 104–74 win over Georgia Tech, the Tar Heels' Tyler Hansbrough made all eight of his free throws and became the NCAA career leader in free throws made with 907. Hansbrough broke Wake Forest's Dickie Hemric's record set in 1955 with his 906th free throw with 14:54 to play in the second half.

March
On March 7, Miami's Jack McClinton was a perfect 16-for-16 from the free throw line and scored a game-high 24 points as the Hurricanes overcame a nine-point halftime deficit en route to a 72–64 win over visiting NC State. McClinton's 16-for-16 effort tied for the fourth-best single-game mark in league history.

== Rankings ==
AP Poll	Pre	1	2	3	4	5	6	7	8	9	10	11	12	13	14	15	16	17	18	Final
Boston College									17	RV				RV	RV					
Clemson	RV	RV	RV	RV	RV	25	22	20	12	10	10	12	10	12	13	12	18	17	24	
Duke	8	10	7	4	7	6	5	5	2	3	2	1	4	6	9	7	7	9	6	
Florida State				RV	RV		RV	RV	RV	RV	RV	RV	RV	25	RV	23	24	22	16	
Georgia Tech			RV																	
Maryland					RV	RV	RV	RV	RV							RV				
Miami	17	17	22	21	RV	RV	RV	RV	RV	RV	RV			RV	RV					
North Carolina	1	1	1	1	1	1	1	1	3	5	5	5	3	3	3	4	2	1	2	
NC State																				
Virginia																				
Virginia Tech	RV	RV										RV								
Wake Forest	24	20	19	15	11	10	6	6	4	2	1	6	7	7	8	13	10	8	12	

== Statistics ==
=== Individual ===
Scoring
Name	School	PPG
Toney Douglas	FSU	21.5
Tyler Hansbrough	UNC	20.7
Jack McClinton	Miami	19.3
A. D. Vassallo	VT	19.1
Jeff Teague	WF	18.8

Rebounding
Name	School	RPG
Trevor Booker	Clem.	9.7
Gani Lawal	GT	9.5
James Johnson	WF	8.5
Jeff Allen	VT	8.4
Al-Farouq Aminu	WF	8.2

Assists
Name	School	APG
Ty Lawson	UNC	6.6
Tyrese Rice	BC	5.3
Greivis Vasquez	MD	5.0
Iman Shumpert	GT	5.0
Malcolm Delaney	VT	4.5

Steals
Name	School	SPG
Ty Lawson	UNC	2.1
Iman Shumpert	GT	2.1
Jeff Teague	WF	1.9
Jeff Allen	VT	1.8
Toney Douglas	FSU	1.8

Blocks
Name	School	BPG
Solomon Alabi	FSU	2.1
Trevor Booker	Clem.	2.0
Alade Aminu	GT	1.8
Ed Davis	UNC	1.7
Assane Sene	UVa	1.6

Field Goals
Name	School	FG%
Trevor Booker	Clem.	.571
Gani Lawal	GT	.556
James Johnson	WF	.542
Ty Lawson	UNC	.532
Alade Aminu	GT	.522

3-Pt Field Goals
Name	School	3FG%
Jack McClinton	Miami	.453
Terrence Oglesby	Clem.	.388
Lewis Clinch	GT	.338

Free Throws
Name	School	FT%
Jack McClinton	Miami	.885
Malcolm Delaney	VT	.869
Greivis Vasquez	MD	.867
Tyrese Rice	BC	.856
Uche Echefu	FSU	.848

=== Teams ===
Team	G	PF	PA	PFPG	PAPG	Margin	FG	FGA	FG%	3FG	3FGA	3FG%	FT	FTA	FT%	RebF	RebA	Margin
Boston College	34	2528	2397	74.4	70.5	+3.9	885	2000	.443	217	649	.334	541	733	.738	1259	1167	+2.7
Clemson	32	2507	2177	78.3	68.0	+10.3	912	1971	.463	256	684	.374	427	621	.688	1189	1127	+1.9
Duke	36	2813	2362	78.1	65.6	+12.5	955	2126	.449	262	739	.355	641	880	.728	1314	1198	+3.2
Florida State	35	2392	2271	68.3	64.9	+3.5	820	1886	.435	216	631	.342	536	739	.725	1253	1221	+0.9
Georgia Tech	31	2208	2216	71.2	71.5	−0.3	815	1868	.436	159	492	.323	419	665	.630	1211	1143	+2.2
Maryland	35	2512	2419	71.8	69.1	+2.7	924	2179	.424	201	604	.333	463	611	.758	1274	1333	−1.7
Miami	32	2325	2123	72.7	66.3	+6.3	796	1865	.427	251	682	.368	482	706	.683	1272	1107	+5.2
NC State	30	2189	2087	73.0	69.6	+3.4	773	1626	.475	202	538	.375	441	615	.717	1075	973	+3.4
North Carolina	38	3413	2735	89.8	72.0	+17.8	1205	2509	.480	264	682	.387	739	983	.752	1594	1353	+6.3
Virginia	28	1960	2029	70.0	72.5	−2.5	701	1682	.417	156	494	.316	402	543	.740	1030	990	+1.4
Virginia Tech	34	2470	2405	72.6	70.7	+1.9	845	1934	.437	207	615	.337	573	791	.724	1257	1153	+3.1
Wake Forest	31	2510	2193	81.0	70.7	+10.2	906	1849	.490	126	394	.320	572	804	.711	1262	1080	+5.9

== Postseason ==
=== ACC Tournament ===
Semifinals
1	North Carolina (13–3)	70
4	Florida State (10–6)	73
7	Maryland (7–9)	61
3	Duke (11–5)	67

Championship
4	Florida State	69
3	Duke	79

The third-seeded Duke Blue Devils defeated fourth-seeded Florida State 79–69 in the title ACC Championship game on Sunday, March 15, giving Duke its ninth ACC crown in 12 years. Duke also tied North Carolina for most tournament championships with 17. Duke's Jon Scheyer was named the tournament MVP.

=== NCAA Tournament ===
Team	Seed	Round	Date	Time	Opponent^{#}	Site	Result	Attendance
North Carolina (6–0)	#1	First	Thur, Mar. 19	2:50 pm	vs. No. 16 Radford	Greensboro Coliseum • Greensboro, NC	W 101–58	20,226
North Carolina (6–0)	#1	Second	Sat, Mar. 21	5:45 pm	vs. No. 8 LSU	Greensboro Coliseum • Greensboro, NC	W 84–70	22,479
North Carolina (6–0)	#1	Sweet 16	Fri, Mar. 27	9:57 pm	vs. No. 4 Gonzaga	FedExForum • Memphis, TN	W 98–77	17,103
North Carolina (6–0)	#1	Elite Eight	Sun, Mar. 29	5:05 pm	vs. No. 2 Oklahoma	FedExForum • Memphis, TN	W 72–60	17,025
North Carolina (6–0)	#1	Final Four	Sat, Apr. 4	8:47 pm	vs. No. 3 Villanova	Ford Field • Detroit, MI	W 83–69	72,456
North Carolina (6–0)	#1	Finals	Mon, Apr. 6	9:21 pm	vs. No. 3 Michigan State	Ford Field • Detroit, MI	W 89–72	72,922
Duke (2–1)	#2	First	Thur, Mar. 19	9:40 pm	vs. No. 15 Binghamton	Greensboro Coliseum • Greensboro, NC	W 86–62	20,001
Duke (2–1)	#2	Second	Sat, Mar. 21	8:15 pm	vs. No. 7 Texas	Greensboro Coliseum • Greensboro, NC	W 74–69	22,479
Duke (2–1)	#2	Sweet 16	Thur, Mar. 26	9:57 pm	vs No. 3 Villanova	TD Banknorth Garden • Boston	L 54–77	18,831
Wake Forest (0–1)	#4	First	Fri, Mar. 20	9:40 pm	vs. No. 13 Cleveland State	American Airlines Arena • Miami, FL	L 69–84	8,990
Florida State (0–1)	#5	First	Fri, Mar. 20	9:55 pm	vs. No. 12 Wisconsin	Taco Bell Arena • Boise, ID	L 59–61^{OT}	12,194
Boston College (0–1)	#7	First	Fri, Mar. 20	7:20 pm	vs. No. 10 USC	Hubert H. Humphrey Metrodome • Minneapolis, MN	L 55–72	12,814
Clemson (0–1)	#7	First	Thur, Mar. 19	7:10 pm	vs. No. 10 Michigan	Sprint Center • Kansas City, MO	L 59–62	17,398
Maryland (1–1)	#10	First	Thur, Mar. 19	2:55 pm	vs. No. 7 California	Sprint Center • Kansas City, MO	W 84–71	17,319
Maryland (1–1)	#10	Second	Sat, Mar. 21	3:20 pm	vs. No. 2 Memphis	Sprint Center • Kansas City, MO	L 70–89	18,247
# indicates seedings. All times are Eastern

Ty Lawson was the South regional MVP and he was joined on the All-regional team by teammates Danny Green and Tyler Hansbrough.

The first-seeded North Carolina Tarheels defeated third-seeded Michigan State 89–72 in the title NCAA Championship game on Monday, April 6, giving North Carolina its second NCAA crown in four years. It was North Carolina's fifth national championship. North Carolina's Wayne Ellington was named the Final Four's Most Outstanding Player.

=== National Invitation Tournament ===
Team	Seed	Round	Date	Time	Opponent^{#}	Site	TV	Result	Attendance
Virginia Tech (1–1)	#2	First	Wed, Mar. 18	7:00 pm	#7 Duquesne	Cassell Coliseum • Blacksburg, VA	ESPNU	W 116–108^{2OT}	5,878
Virginia Tech (1–1)	#2	Second	Sat, Mar. 21	11:00 am	#3 Baylor	Cassell Coliseum • Blacksburg, VA	ESPN	L 66–84	6,891
Miami (1–1)	#4	First	Wed, Mar. 18	7:00 pm	@ No. 5 Providence	Dunkin' Donuts Center • Providence, RI	ESPN2	W 78–66	5,645
Miami (1–1)	#4	Second	Fri, Mar. 20	7:00 pm	@ No. 1 Florida	Stephen C. O'Connell Center • Gainesville, FL	ESPNU	L 60–74	6,525
# Rankings indicate seedings. All times are Eastern

== Conference awards and honors ==
=== Weekly awards ===
ACC Players of the Week
Throughout the conference season, the ACC offices name a player and rookie of the week. The MVP of the ACC tournament is the automatic winner of the final ACC player of the week of each season.

Week	Player of the week	Rookie of the week
November 17	Kyle Singler, Duke	Sylven Landesberg, UVA
November 17	Trevor Booker, Clem.	Sylven Landesberg, UVA
November 24	Greivis Vasquez, MD	Sylven Landesberg, UVA
December 1	Ty Lawson, UNC	Al-Farouq Aminu, WF
December 8	Greivis Vasquez, MD	Iman Shumpert, GT
December 15	Tyler Hansbrough, UNC	Chris Singleton, FSU
December 22	K. C. Rivers, Clem.	Sylven Landesberg, UVA
December 29	Toney Douglas, FSU	Sylven Landesberg, UVA
January 5	Tyrese Rice, BC	Al-Farouq Aminu, WF
January 12	Jeff Teague, WF	Sylven Landesberg, UVA
January 19	Jeff Teague, WF	Al-Farouq Aminu, WF
January 26	Malcolm Delaney, VT	Reggie Jackson, BC
February 2	K. C. Rivers, Clem.	Al-Farouq Aminu, WF
February 2	Gani Lawal, GT	Al-Farouq Aminu, WF
February 9	Jack McClinton, Mia.	Solomon Alabi, FSU
February 16	Ty Lawson, UNC	Sylven Landesberg, UVA
February 23	Greivis Vasquez, MD	Elliot Williams, Duke
March 2	Gerald Henderson, Duke	Solomon Alabi, FSU
March 9	Toney Douglas, FSU	Al-Farouq Aminu, WF
March 16	Jon Scheyer, Duke	None Selected

=== Season awards ===
Player of the Year

- Ty Lawson – North Carolina

Rookie of the Year

- Sylven Landesberg – Virginia

Coach of the Year

- Leonard Hamilton – Florida State

Defensive Player of the Year

- Toney Douglas – Florida State

All-Atlantic Coast Conference

First Team
- Tyler Hansbrough^{1} – North Carolina
- Toney Douglas – Florida State
- Ty Lawson – North Carolina
- Gerald Henderson – Duke
- Jack McClinton – Miami

1 – Denotes unanimous selection

Second Team
- Jeff Teague – Wake Forest
- Trevor Booker – Clemson
- Tyrese Rice – Boston College
- Kyle Singler – Duke
- Greivis Vasquez – Maryland
Third Team
- James Johnson – Wake Forest
- Malcolm Delaney – Virginia Tech
- A. D. Vassallo – Virginia Tech
- Danny Green – North Carolina
- Gani Lawal – Georgia Tech

Honorable Mention: Wayne Ellington – North Carolina, K.C. Rivers – Clemson, Sylven Landesberg – Virginia

All-ACC Freshman team

- Sylven Landesberg^{1} – Virginia
- Al-Farouq Aminu^{1} – Wake Forest
- Iman Shumpert – Georgia Tech
- Solomon Alabi – Florida State
- Ed Davis – North Carolina

1 – Denotes unanimous selection
Honorable Mention: Chris Singleton – Florida State

All-ACC Defensive team

- Trevor Booker – Clemson
- Toney Douglas – Florida State
- Solomon Alabi – Florida State
- Danny Green – North Carolina
- L. D. Williams – Wake Forest

Honorable Mention: Ty Lawson – North Carolina, Gani Lawal – Georgia Tech, Courtney Fells – NC State, Gerald Henderson – Duke

All-ACC Academic team
To be eligible for consideration, a student-athlete must have earned a 3.00 grade point average for the previous semester and maintained a 3.00 cumulative average during his academic career. Four players – McClinton, Paulus, Duke's Brian Zoubek and Virginia's Jerome Meyinsse – are repeaters from previous league all-academic teams. McClinton and Paulus were named to the team for the third time in their careers, while Zoubek and Meyinsse are two-time selections.

Name	School	Year	Hometown	Major
Jack McClinton	Miami	SR	Baltimore, MD	Sport Administration
Jerome Meyinsse	UVa	JR	Baton Rouge, LA	Economics
Greg Paulus	Duke	SR	Syracuse, NY	Political Science
Tanner Smith	Clemson	FR	Alpharetta, GA	Pre-Business
Tunji Soroye	UVa	SR	Dugbe Ibadan, Nigeria	Education
Johnny Thomas	NC State	FR	Morehead City, NC	Sport Management
Tyler Zeller	North Carolina	FR	Washington, IN	Business Administration
Brian Zoubek	Duke	JR	Haddonfield, NJ	History

== National awards and honors ==
=== NABC ===
On March 5, the National Association of Basketball Coaches announced their Division I All-District teams, recognizing the nation's best men's collegiate basketball student-athletes. Selected and voted on by member coaches of the NABC, 240 student-athletes, from 24 districts were chosen. The selection on this list are then eligible for the State Farm Coaches' Division I All-America teams to be announced at the 2009 NABC Convention in Detroit. The following list represents the ACC players chosen to the list. All ACC schools are within District 2.

First Team

- Tyler Hansbrough – North Carolina
- Jeff Teague – Wake Forest
- Toney Douglas – Florida State
- Jack McClinton – Miami
- Ty Lawson – North Carolina
Second Team
- Tyrese Rice – Boston College
- Gerald Henderson – Duke
- Trevor Booker – Clemson
- Kyle Singler – Duke
- A. D. Vassallo – Virginia Tech

=== USBWA ===
On March 10, the U.S. Basketball Writers Association released its 2008–09 Men's All-District Teams, based on voting from its national membership. There are nine regions from coast to coast and a player and coach of the year are selected in each. The following is each ACC player selected within their respective regions.

District I (ME, VT, NH, RI, MA, CT)

All-District Team

- Tyrese Rice, Boston College
- Joe Trapani, Boston College
District III (VA, NC, SC, MD)

Player of the Year

- Ty Lawson, North Carolina

Coach of the Year

- Oliver Purnell, Clemson

All-District Team

- Trevor Booker, Clemson
- Tyler Hansbrough, North Carolina
- Gerald Henderson, Duke
- Ty Lawson, North Carolina
- Kyle Singler, Duke
- Jeff Teague, Wake
- Greivis Vasquez, Maryland
District IV (KY, TN MS, AL, GA, FL)

All-District Team

- Toney Douglas, Florida State

=== CoSIDA ===
On February 5, 2009, the College Sports Information Directors of America (CoSIDA) and ESPN The Magazine selected their Academic All-Americans from throughout college basketball. To be nominated, a student-athlete must be a starter or important reserve with at least a 3.30 cumulative grade point average (on a 4.0 scale) at his/her current institution. Nominated athletes must have participated in at least 50 percent of the team's games at the position listed on the nomination form (where applicable). No student-athlete is eligible until he has completed one full calendar year at his current institution and has reached sophomore athletic eligibility. In the cases of transfers, graduate students and two-year college graduates, the student-athlete must have completed one full calendar year at the nominating institution to be eligible. Nominees in graduate school must have a cumulative GPA of 3.30 or better both as an undergrad and in grad school. The ACC had two players selected from District III as first-team Academic All-District selections: Greg Paulus and Brian Zoubek, both from Duke. Greg Paulus was also selected overall by the CoSIDA as a third-team Academic All-American.

=== All-American ===
Consensus All-Americans
First Team	Second Team
Tyler Hansbrough – North Carolina	Ty Lawson – North Carolina; Jeff Teague – Wake Forest

To earn "consensus" status, a player must win honors from a majority of the following teams: the Associated Press, the USBWA, The Sporting News and the National Association of Basketball Coaches.

Associated Press	NABC	Sporting News	USBWA
First Team
Tyler Hansbrough – North Carolina	Tyler Hansbrough – North Carolina	Tyler Hansbrough – North Carolina	Tyler Hansbrough – North Carolina
Second Team
Ty Lawson – North Carolina	Ty Lawson – North Carolina; Jeff Teague – Wake Forest	Ty Lawson – North Carolina; Jeff Teague – Wake Forest	Jeff Teague – Wake Forest
Third Team
Toney Douglas – Florida State; Gerald Henderson – Duke	Gerald Henderson – Duke	Toney Douglas – Florida State	
Honorable Mention
Tyrese Rice – Boston College; Kyle Singler – Duke; Jeff Teague – Wake Forest			
