= 2009 America East men's basketball tournament =

- Classification: Division I
- Season: 2008–09
- First round site: SEFCU Arena; Albany, New York
- Quarterfinals site: SEFCU Arena; Albany, New York
- Semifinals site: SEFCU Arena; Albany, New York
- Finals site: Binghamton University Events Center; Vestal, New York
- Champions: Binghamton (1st title)
- Winning coach: Kevin Broadus (1st title)
- MVP: D.J. Rivera (Binghamton)

2008–09 America East men's basketball standings
| | Conf. | | | | Overall |
| Team | W | | L | PCT | W | | L | PCT |
|---|---|---|---|---|---|---|---|---|
| Binghamton † | 13 | – | 3 | .813 | 23 | – | 9 | .719 |
| Vermont | 13 | – | 3 | .813 | 24 | – | 9 | .727 |
| Boston University | 11 | – | 5 | .688 | 17 | – | 13 | .567 |
| New Hampshire | 8 | – | 8 | .500 | 14 | – | 16 | .467 |
| Stony Brook | 8 | – | 8 | .500 | 16 | – | 14 | .533 |
| UMBC | 7 | – | 9 | .438 | 15 | – | 17 | .469 |
| Albany | 6 | – | 10 | .375 | 15 | – | 16 | .484 |
| Maine | 4 | – | 12 | .250 | 9 | – | 21 | .300 |
| Hartford | 2 | – | 14 | .125 | 7 | – | 26 | .212 |
† America East tournament winner As of March 20, 2009; Rankings from AP Poll

The 2009 America East men's basketball tournament was held from March 6–8 through at SEFCU Arena place on the University at Albany campus. The final was held on March 14 at the Events Center, the home court of the Binghamton Bearcats, who were the highest remaining seed.

The Bearcats earned their first ever trip to the NCAA tournament, and were given the #15 seed in the East Regional. They played Duke in the first round of the Tournament, losing 86–62. Vermont gained a bid to the 2009 College Basketball Invitational, and won in the first round against Green Bay 76–72, but would lose in the Quarter-Finals against Oregon State by a score of 71–70 in Overtime.

== Bracket ==
The tournament took place March 6–14.

First round Friday, March 6
8 | Maine | 56
9 | Hartford | 65

Quarterfinals; Saturday, March 7
1 | Binghamton | 73
9 | Hartford | 65
4 | New Hampshire | 76
5 | Stony Brook | 73
3 | Boston | 75
6 | UMBC | 79
2 | Vermont | 52
7 | Albany | 56

Semifinals; Sunday, March 8
1 | Binghamton | 72
4 | New Hampshire | 67
6 | UMBC | 64
7 | Albany | 58

America East Championship; Saturday, March 14
1 | Binghamton | 61
6 | UMBC | 51

== Controversy ==
One month after the SEFCU Arena site was announced, the Metro Atlantic Athletic Conference announced that they would be moving their 2009 Men's and Women's Tournament from the Sovereign Bank Arena in Trenton, New Jersey to the Times Union Center in Albany to be played on the same weekend as the America East.

== See also ==
- America East Conference
