= Jack McClinton =

American basketball player (born 1985)

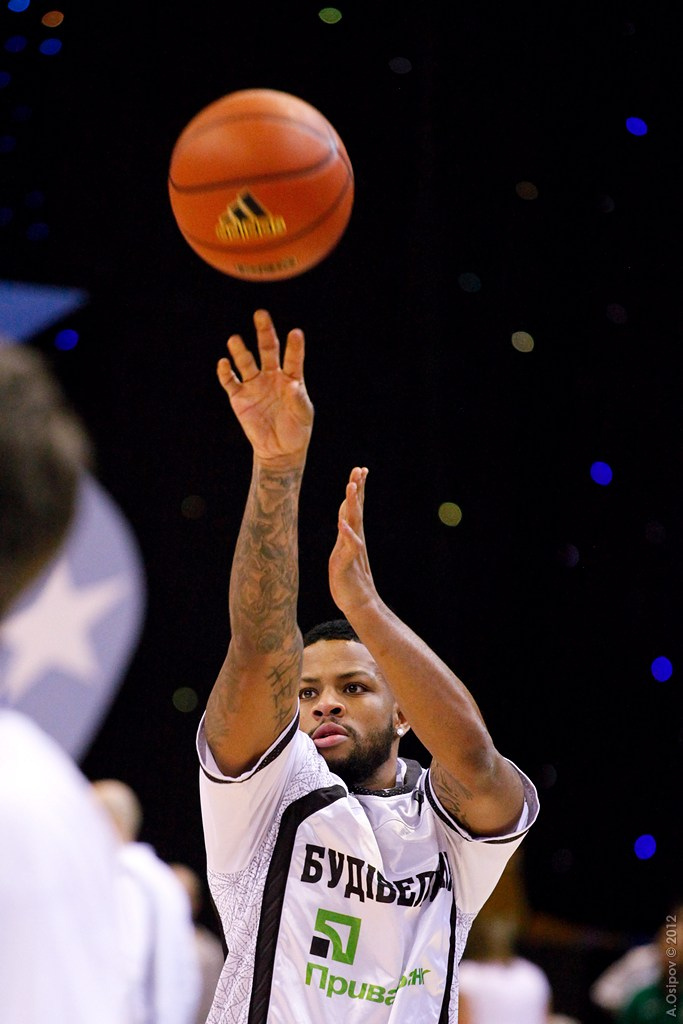

Personal information
- Born: January 19, 1985 (age 41) Baltimore, Maryland, U.S.
- Listed height: 6 ft 0 in (1.83 m)
- Listed weight: 185 lb (84 kg)

Career information
- High school: Calvert Hall College (Towson, Maryland); South Kent School (South Kent, Connecticut)
- College: Siena (2004–2005); Miami (Florida) (2006–2009)
- NBA draft: 2009: 2nd round, 51st overall pick
- Drafted by: San Antonio Spurs
- Playing career: 2009–2012
- Position: Shooting guard / point guard

Career history
- 2009–2010: Aliağa Petkim
- 2010–2011: Gilboa Galil
- 2011–2012: BC Budivelnyk
- 2012: Reno Bighorns

Career highlights
- 2× First-team All-ACC (2008, 2009); Third-team All-ACC (2007); No. 33 honored by Miami Hurricanes
- Stats at Basketball Reference

Jack Paul McClinton (born January 19, 1985) is an American former professional basketball player. McClinton played shooting guard for the University of Miami Hurricanes men's basketball team.

He was selected in the second round by the San Antonio Spurs in the 2009 NBA draft. After being waived by the Spurs, he played for Aliağa Petkim (Turkey), Gilboa Galil (Israel), BC Budivelnyk (Ukraine), and the Reno Bighorns (D-League).

== High school career ==
McClinton attended South Kent School in Connecticut for one season, where one of his teammates was future NBA player Dorell Wright, following a four-year career at Calvert Hall College High School in Baltimore.

== College career ==
After graduating from high school, McClinton received a few scholarship offers for basketball, and decided to attend Siena College, a small college in New York. He transferred out of Siena as his coach, Rob Lanier, was fired at the end of the season. Several schools were interested in McClinton's services, including the University of Maryland, College Park, but he chose to attend the University of Miami instead as he thought UM would provide more playing time. After sitting out a full year because of NCAA transfer regulations, McClinton was selected to the 2007–08 Atlantic Coast Conference men's basketball season First Team All-ACC, after leading the league in three-point field goals and free throw percentage. For the 2008–09 Atlantic Coast Conference men's basketball season, McClinton joined Tyler Hansbrough as the only players to repeat First-Team All-ACC Honors. He finished as the third leading scorer in the ACC, averaging 19.4 points per game.

Jack McClinton was inducted into the University of Miami Sports Hall of Fame in 2022.

=== College statistics ===
Season averages
Season	Team	G	PTS	REB	AST	STL	BLK	FG%	3P%	FT%	MIN	TO
2004–05	Siena Saints	30	13.6	5.0	2.6	1.1	0.0	.423	.357	.815	32.3	2.6
2005–06	Miami Hurricanes	Did not play – Transfer										
2006–07	Miami Hurricanes	31	16.7	2.5	2.1	0.7	0.0	.404	.440	.895	31.5	2.4
2007–08	Miami Hurricanes	32	17.7	2.4	2.6	0.8	0.0	.428	.427	.919	31.5	2.5
2008–09	Miami Hurricanes	32	19.3	3.1	2.8	0.8	0.0	.449	.453	.885	32.2	2.6
Totals:		125	16.9	3.2	2.6	0.8	0.0	.427	.426	.880	31.9	2.5

== Professional career ==
After McClinton was waived by the San Antonio Spurs he signed with Aliağa Petkim in the Turkish Basketball League. Halfway through the season he was averaging 16.1 points on 40.4% shooting and 34.1% from 3-point range in 30.7 minutes per game. He shot his free throws at an accuracy of 85.7%. His highest scoring game of the season took place on December 23, 2009, when he made 8 three-pointers on his way to 33 points.

McClinton played in Israel with Gilboa Galil during the 2010–2011 season, averaging 8.4 ppg in 27 games.

In August 2011, McClinton signed with BC Budivelnyk of the Ukrainian Basketball SuperLeague. In November 2012 he was selected in the 1st round of the NBA's D-League draft by the Erie BayHawks.

On December 27, 2012, McClinton was traded to the Fort Wayne Mad Ants. In February 2013, he was waived by the Mad Ants. He did not appear in a game for them.

== Outside basketball ==
McClinton together with Carlos Boozer co-founded a men's swimwear company, Loaded Dock.
