= Kevin Broadus =

American college basketball coach

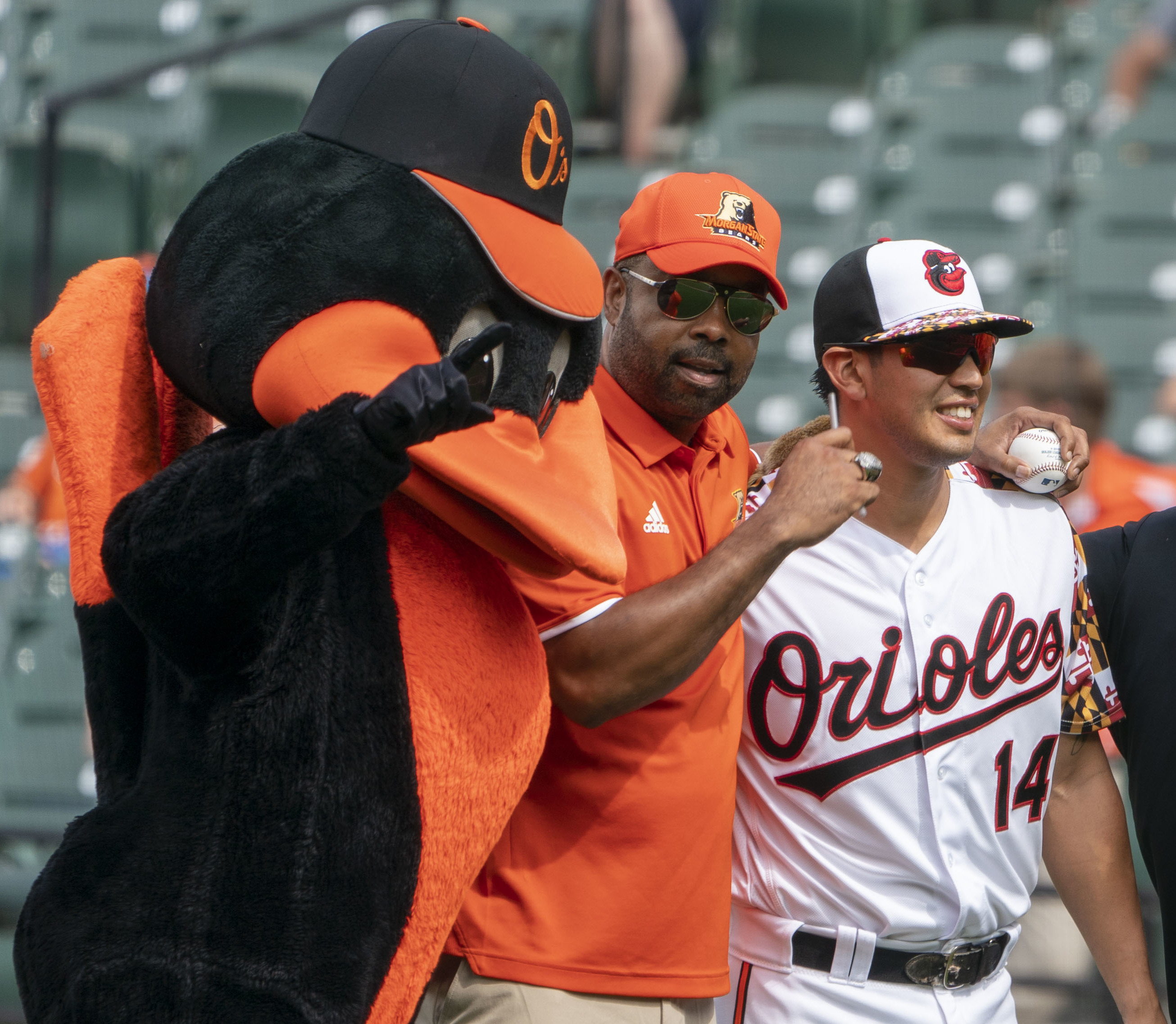
- Broadus (center) with The Oriole Bird and Rio Ruiz in 2019

Current position
- Title: Head coach
- Team: Morgan State
- Conference: MEAC
- Record: 96–109 (.468)

Biographical details
- Born: January 30, 1964 (age 62); Washington, D.C., U.S.

Playing career
- 1982–1983: Grambling State
- 1983–1986: Bowie State

Coaching career (HC unless noted)
- 1990–1993: Bowie State (assistant)
- 1993–1997: UDC (assistant)
- 1997–2001: American (assistant)
- 2001–2004: George Washington (assistant)
- 2004–2007: Georgetown (assistant)
- 2007–2009: Binghamton
- 2011–2017: Georgetown (assistant)
- 2017–2019: Maryland (assistant)
- 2019–present: Morgan State

Head coaching record
- Overall: 133–134 (.498)
- Tournaments: 0–1 (NCAA Division I); 0–1 (TBC)

Accomplishments and honors

Championships
- America East regular season (2009); America East tournament (2009)

Awards
- America East Coach of the Year (2009); MEAC Coach of the Year (2026)

Kevin Levoin Broadus (born January 30, 1964) is an American college basketball coach and currently the head coach at Morgan State. He is the former head coach at Binghamton University, where he resigned after an NCAA Investigation.

== Playing career ==
Broadus began playing collegiately at Grambling State University, but transferred after his first season to Bowie State University. He played for Bowie State from 1983 to 1986, earning conference all-rookie honors in the 1984 season, and leading his team in scoring as a captain during his senior year. Broadus graduated from Bowie State in 1990 with a degree in business administration.

== Coaching career ==
=== Assistant coach (1990–2007) ===
After a playing career at Bowie State, Broadus stayed on with his alma mater as an assistant coach until 1993, when he joined the University of the District of Columbia coaching staff.

For the next fourteen years he served as an assistant coach for several different programs in Washington, DC. In 1997, he was hired as an assistant at American University, before also serving as an assistant at George Washington University, and finally Georgetown University under John Thompson III. In Broadus's final year as an assistant coach at Georgetown, the team reached the 2007 Final Four.

=== Binghamton (2007–2009) ===
After the 2007 season, Broadus was named the head coach at Binghamton, where he guided the Bearcats to their first ever NCAA Tournament appearance in 2009.

In September 2009, Broadus dismissed six players from the team for undisclosed team rules violations, later revealed to involve various criminal actions. Soon after, Joel Thirer, Binghamton's athletic director and the man who hired Broadus, was reassigned to a position outside the athletic department. On October 6, 2009, Broadus committed an NCAA violation by communicating with high school players during a no-contact period. On October 14, Broadus was placed on paid administrative leave—effectively a suspension with pay—pending a full investigation of operations into the men's basketball program. Assistant Mark Macon was named interim coach.

The Bearcats started the 2009–10 season with only seven scholarship players, an interim coach, and an interim athletic director. Investigation into the actions of Broadus and the athletic department went past the university level and were handled by the chancellor of the SUNY system, Nancy Zimpher. In March 2010, Zimpher announced that Broadus would not return as coach. However, a permanent replacement would not be hired until the school hired a permanent president and athletic director.

The NCAA completed its own investigation in October 2010. It found that assistant coach Marc Hsu had committed secondary violations by providing transportation to players. However, due to a lack of cooperation from people involved in the case, the NCAA was unable to determine whether major violations occurred. Shortly afterward, Broadus was reassigned to another position in the athletic department.

On October 29, 2010 Broadus announced he was filing a federal discrimination lawsuit against Binghamton and SUNY. Hours later, the three parties reached a settlement in which Broadus would resign and take a $1.2 million buyout in return for dropping all legal action against BU or SUNY.

=== Return to assistant coaching (2011–2019) ===
After Binghamton, Broadus rejoined Thompson's staff at Georgetown in 2011. After Thompson was fired in 2017, Broadus was named an assistant coach on Mark Turgeon's staff at Maryland.

=== Morgan State (2019–present) ===
On May 1, 2019, Broadus was named the 16th head coach in Morgan State history, replacing Todd Bozeman. Broadus's contract was extended following the 2021-22 season, during which the Bears were selected to play in The Basketball Classic tournament.

== Head coaching record ==
Record table
Season	Team	Overall	Conference	Standing	Postseason
Binghamton Bearcats (America East Conference) (2007–2009)
2007–08	Binghamton	14–16	9–7	T–4th	
2008–09	Binghamton	23–9	13–3	T–1st	NCAA Division I Round of 64
Binghamton:		37–25 (.597)	22–10 (.688)		
Morgan State Bears (Mid-Eastern Athletic Conference) (2019–present)
2019–20	Morgan State	15–16	9–7	6th	
2020–21	Morgan State	14–8	7–5	3rd (Northern)	
2021–22	Morgan State	13–15	7–6	4th	TBC First Round
2022–23	Morgan State	15–16	8–7	5th	
2023–24	Morgan State	11–20	7–7	5th	
2024–25	Morgan State	14–18	7–7	T–4th	
2025–26	Morgan State	14–16	10–4	2nd	
2026–27	Morgan State	0–0	0–0		
Morgan State:		96–109 (.468)	55–43 (.561)		
Total:		133–134 (.498)			
National champion Postseason invitational champion Conference regular season champion Conference regular season and conference tournament champion Division regular season champion Division regular season and conference tournament champion Conference tournament champion
