= Shelley Steiner =

Canadian fencer (born 1961)

Personal information
- Born: 23 October 1961 (age 64) Toronto, Ontario, Canada
- Height: 167 cm (5 ft 6 in)
- Weight: 58 kg (128 lb)

Sport
- Sport: Fencing
Medal record
Women's fencing
Representing Canada
Maccabiah Games
Gold medal – first place	1981 Israel	Individual Women's Foil

Shelley Steiner, also known as Shelley Steiner-Wetterberg (born 23 October 1961) is a Canadian fencer, who fenced in three Olympic Games and won a gold medal in the 1981 Maccabiah Games in Israel.

== Biography ==
Steiner was born in Toronto, Canada. She lives in Montigny-sur-Loing, France.

She competed in the women's team foil events at the 1984 Summer Olympics (coming in 9th), the 1988 Summer Olympics (coming in 9th), and the 1992 Summer Olympics (coming in 12th).

Steiner won a gold medal in foil at the 1981 Maccabiah Games in Israel.
