= Alan Ezekowitz =

South African physician and cricketer

Personal information
- Full name: Raymond Alan Bryan Ezekowitz
- Born: 19 January 1954 (age 72); Durban, Natal, South Africa
- Batting: Right-handed

Domestic team information
- Years: Team
- 1980–1981: Oxford University

Career statistics
Competition	First-class	List A
Matches	18	4
Runs scored	635	33
Batting average	20.48	8.25
100s/50s	–/3	–/–
Top score	93	26
Balls bowled	0	3
Wickets	–	0
Bowling average	–	–
5 wickets in innings	–	–
10 wickets in match	–	–
Best bowling	–	–
Catches/stumpings	13/–	1/–
- Source: Cricinfo, 4 September 2019

Raymond Alan Bryan Ezekowitz (born 19 January 1954) is a South African physician and former cricketer.

== Education ==
Ezekowitz was born at Durban, South Africa. He studied medicine at the University of Cape Town. While studying at UCT he played cricket for the UCT cricket team.

== Cricket career ==
In 1974 he represented UCT in South African Universities Cricket week for the first time. He scored the most runs in the tournament and was awarded the prize for the best batsman of the week and was selected in the squad of 12 players to represent South African Universities.

In 1979 as part of compulsory national service he was chosen to captain the South African Defence Force Cricket team.

He then undertook doctoral studies in England at Wolfson College, Oxford. While studying at Oxford, he made his debut in first-class cricket for Oxford University against Gloucestershire at Oxford in 1980. He played first-class cricket for Oxford until 1981, making a total of 18 appearances. In his 18 matches, he scored a total of 635 runs at an average of 20.48 and a high score of 93, which was one of three half centuries he made. In addition to playing first-class cricket while at Oxford, he also made four List A one-day appearances for the Combined Universities cricket team in the 1980 Benson & Hedges Cup. In addition he played for a combined Oxford Cambridge team against the West Indies in 1980, where he scored 32 runs in the first innings and put-on 105 for the second wicket with Aziz Mubarak who scored 86. He was chosen to represent the MCC, captained by M.H Dennis, v Ireland at Lord's Cricket Ground August 12,13 1981 and he scored 70.

He represented England in cricket at the 1981 Maccabiah Games in Israel.

In 1982 July 8,9 he represented the MCC v Scotland at Lord's Cricket Ground and he scored 107 not out.

== Medical career ==
After graduating from Oxford, he received a D.Phil. In 1984 he emigrated to the United States. He completed an internship in pediatrics and a postdoctoral fellowship at The Boston Children's Hospital. In 1995 he was appointed as the Charles Wilder Professor of Pediatrics, Harvard Medical School to serve as the Chief of Pediatrics at the Massachusetts General Hospital. In 1999 he was appointed the head of pediatrics for the Partners Healthcare System and Head of the Mass General Hospital for Children.

In 2006 he joined Merck & Co. where he served as a Senior Vice President and Head of the Franchise that covered a number of therapeutic areas. These therapeutic areas include bone, respiratory, endocrine, immunology, dermatology, urology and women's health. In 2011 he left Merck.

Until June 2019, he served as the CEO of Abide Therapeutics, which he founded in 2011. Abide was acquired by Lundbeck Pharma in the summer of 2019. In December 2019 he joined Third Rock Ventures as a Venture Partner.

== Research ==
He is one of the early investigators in the field of innate immunity. He served as the Head of the Laboratory of Developmental Immunology and has published over 150 scientific papers. In 2008 he was honored by the establishment of the R Alan Ezekowitz Professorship of Pediatrics at the Harvard Medical School.
