= Sylven Landesberg =

Professional basketball player

Sylven Landesberg סילבן לנדסברג
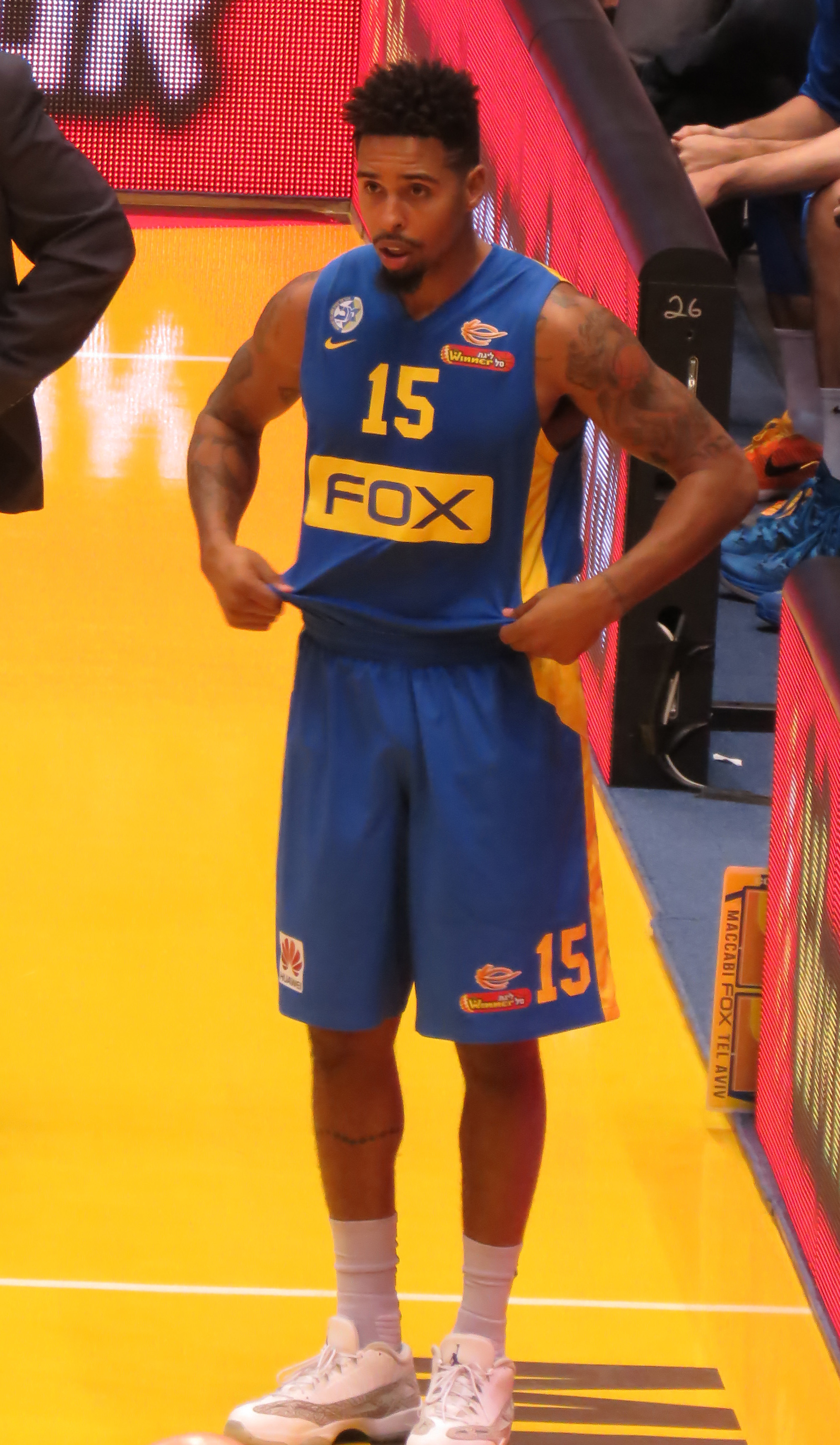
- Landesberg with Maccabi Tel Aviv in 2015

No. 15 – Klosterneuburg Dukes
- Position: Shooting guard / small forward
- League: Austrian Basketball Superliga

Personal information
- Born: April 10, 1990 (age 36) Brooklyn, New York, U.S.
- Listed height: 6 ft 6 in (1.98 m)
- Listed weight: 210 lb (95 kg)

Career information
- High school: Holy Cross (Flushing, New York)
- College: Virginia (2008–2010)
- NBA draft: 2010: undrafted
- Playing career: 2010–present

Career history
- 2010–2012: Maccabi Haifa
- 2012–2017: Maccabi Tel Aviv
- 2017–2018: Estudiantes
- 2018–2019: Türk Telekom
- 2019–2021: Zhejiang Golden Bulls
- 2021–2022: Beijing Royal Fighters
- 2022–2023: Shandong Hi-Speed Kirin
- 2023–2024: Gran Canaria
- 2024–2025: Al-Ula
- 2025–present: Klosterneuburg Dukes

Career highlights
- EuroLeague champion (2014); Israeli Super League champion (2014); 5× Israeli State Cup winner (2013–2017); All-Liga ACB First Team (2018); Israeli Supercup MVP (2013); ACC Rookie of the Year (2009); Second-team All-ACC (2010); ACC All-Freshman team (2009); McDonald's All-American (2008); Second-team Parade All-American (2008); Mr. New York Basketball (2008)

Sylven Joshua Landesberg (Hebrew: סילבן לנדסברג; born April 10, 1990) is an American-Israeli-Austrian professional basketball player for Klosterneuburg Dukes in the Austrian Basketball Superliga. Standing at 6 ft 6 in (1.98 m), he plays at the shooting guard and small forward positions.

He was a 2008 McDonald's High School All American and 2008 New York State Mr. Basketball in high school, and 2008–09 ACC Freshman of the Year for the University of Virginia Cavaliers. He played for Maccabi Haifa in Israel from 2010 to 2012, and with Maccabi Tel Aviv from 2012 to 2017, winning the EuroLeague in 2014.

== High school career ==
In his sophomore year at Holy Cross High School in Flushing, New York, he averaged 20.9 points, 8.1 rebounds, and 1.7 assists a game during 2005–06. He was named First-Team All-City by the New York Daily News and the New York Post. In 2006–07, during his junior year, he averaged 25.7 points, 10.5 rebounds, and 3.6 assists a game, and was again named All-City honors by the Daily News and the Post.

During his senior year in 2007–08, he averaged 29.6 points, 11.4 rebounds, and 3.1 assists a game. He shot 52% from the field, and 77% from the free throw line. He scored a school-record 2,149 career points in three years on the team.

He was a 2008 McDonald's High School All American, and was named New York State Mr. Basketball. He was also a second-team Parade All-American, first-team All-State, New York Gatorade Player of the Year, New York Post Player of the Year, and a U.S. All Star in the 2008 Capital Classic.

== College career ==
His parents said he chose the University of Virginia over St. John's University because he felt it was a superior academic school.

During the 2008–09 season, in his freshman year, he averaged 16.6 points (third-best for a freshman in UVA history), 6.0 rebounds, and 2.8 assists a game. He led the team in scoring, and was second in rebounds and assists. He also led Atlantic Coast Conference (ACC) freshmen in scoring, and was third in rebounds and assists. He was 10th in the ACC in scoring. He set a UVA freshman record with 12 20-point games (surpassing the 9 by Ralph Sampson in 1979–80).

He was named ACC Rookie of the Year, six-time ACC Rookie of the Week, a unanimous selection to the ACC All-Freshmen Team, honorable mention All-ACC, second-team Freshman All-American by CBS, CollegeHoops.net, and NaismithLives.com, and won the team's Sidney Young Memorial Award (individual who exemplifies leadership, cooperative spirit, and unselfish service).

In Landesberg's sophomore season he led the Cavaliers in scoring again, averaging 17.3 points a game (sixth in the ACC), along with 4.9 rebounds and 2.9 assists. He ranked sixth in the ACC in free throw percentage (.810), and seventh in field goal percentage (.443).

He was named second-team All-ACC, 2-time ACC Player of the Week, USBWA All-District III, NABC All-District 2 first team. In 2009–10, Landesberg was named to the Jewish Sports Review All-American team.

On March 6, 2010, Landesberg was suspended for the remaining game of the season for failing to meet academic obligations. On March 23, it was announced that Landesberg would not return to the Cavaliers.

=== College statistics ===
Year	Team	GP	GS	MPG	FG%	3P%	FT%	RPG	APG	SPG	BPG	PPG
2008–09	Virginia	28	27	34.2	.436	.314	.800	6.0	2.8	1.0	.1	16.6
2009–10	Virginia	27	27	32.1	.443	.383	.810	4.9	2.9	.8	.3	17.3
Career		55	54	33.2	.439	.351	.804	5.5	2.8	.9	.2	16.9

== Professional career ==
=== Early years (2010–2012) ===
After going undrafted in the 2010 NBA draft, Landesberg played for the Sacramento Kings in the 2010 NBA Summer League.

On July 25, 2010, Landesberg signed a two-year deal with the Israeli team Maccabi Haifa of the Israeli Basketball Super League. Due to the fact his father is Jewish, Landesberg received Israeli citizenship. He played his first season for the team in 2010–11. "Hopefully, I'll make it to the NBA, but I will definitely never forget my time in Israel no matter where I go. It is a huge part of my growing up," he said.

=== Maccabi Tel Aviv (2012–2017) ===
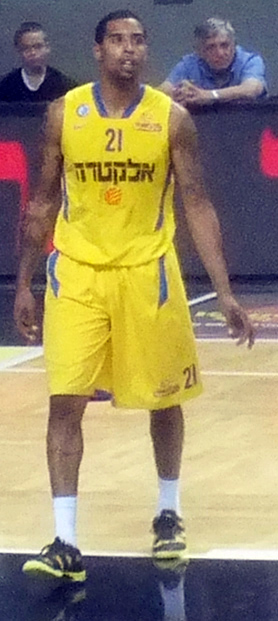
Landesberg in 2013

On July 4, 2012, he signed a three-year contract with Maccabi Tel Aviv. In the first two seasons with the team, he saw very little playing time. In the 2013–14 season, his team won the EuroLeague by defeating Real Madrid in an overtime 98–86 victory.

During the summer of 2014, after departure of some key players, his role in the team and minutes on the court increased. On October 5, in a pre-season game against the Cleveland Cavaliers, he led his team in scoring with 23 points, also having 5 rebounds, 3 assists and steals. The Cleveland Cavaliers eventually won the game with 107–80.

On November 20, he scored a season-high 22 points and added 9 rebounds in a EuroLeague game against Limoges CSP. On January 23, against Žalgiris Kaunas he scored 20 points. Maccabi, the defending EuroLeague champion, lost to Fenerbahçe in the quarterfinal series with 3–0.

On April 21, 2015, he signed a new three-year contract with a fourth year option with Maccabi.

=== Estudiantes (2017–2018) ===
On August 1, 2017, Landesberg signed with Spanish club Movistar Estudiantes for the 2017–18 season. On 1 April 2018, Landesberg recorded a career-high 48 points, shooting 8-of-11 from three-point range, in a 100–95 win over FC Barcelona. On May 24, 2018, Landesberg was named All-Liga ACB First Team and finished in the fifth place in voting for the Liga ACB MVP of the season. In 30 Liga ACB games, he averaged 20.1 points, 4 rebounds and 1.9 assists per game.

=== Türk Telekom (2018–2019) ===
On June 22, 2018, Landesberg signed with the Turkish team Türk Telekom for the 2018–19 season. On May 12, 2019, Landesberg recorded a season-high 43 points, shooting 14-of-21 from the field, along with six rebounds in a 96–83 win over Banvit. In 42 games played in the EuroCup and Turkish competitions, he averaged 19.2 points, 3.3 rebounds, and 2 assists per game. Landesberg helped Türk Telekom reach the 2019 BSL Playoffs, where they eventually were eliminated by Fenerbahçe in the Quarterfinals.

=== Zhejiang Golden Bulls (2019–2021) ===
On July 14, 2019, Landesberg signed with the Zhejiang Golden Bulls of the Chinese Basketball Association. He averaged 26.1 points and 7.8 rebounds per game in 2019–2020. On September 17, 2020, Landesburg re-signed with the team.

=== Beijing Royal Fighters (2021–2022) ===
On December 30, 2021, Landesberg signed with the Beijing Royal Fighters of the Chinese Basketball Association.

== Austria national team ==
On November 9, 2018, Landesberg was named a member of the Austria national basketball team for the EuroBasket 2021 qualification.

On November 29, 2018, Landesberg recorded 49 points in his debut, scoring 40 points in the first half. He also added ten rebounds, five assists and two steals, leading the Austrian team to a 96–82 win over Great Britain. Later his record was corrected to 47 points.

== Personal life ==
Landesberg is Jewish, and was born in Brooklyn to an Austrian-Jewish father, Steven, and a Trinidadian and Tobagonian mother, Ingrid. He holds an Israeli and Austrian passports.

== Career statistics ==
Legend
GP	Games played	GS	Games started	MPG	Minutes per game
FG%	Field-goal percentage	3P%	3-point field-goal percentage	FT%	Free-throw percentage
RPG	Rebounds per game	APG	Assists per game	SPG	Steals per game
BPG	Blocks per game	PPG	Points per game	PIR	Performance index rating
**Bold**	Career high

=== EuroLeague ===
†	Denotes seasons in which Landesberg won the EuroLeague

Year	Team	GP	GS	MPG	FG%	3P%	FT%	RPG	APG	SPG	BPG	PPG	PIR
2012–13	Maccabi	**24**	0	10.7	**.537**	.304	**.857**	1.3	.5	.3	**.1**	3.5	3.2
2013–14†	Maccabi	19	0	8.5	.457	.250	.789	1.2	.1	.2	—	3.2	2.6
2014–15	Maccabi	19	1	18.2	.457	.315	.643	**2.5**	.4	.3	**.1**	8.5	**6.2**
2015–16	Maccabi	10	**3**	**21.3**	.365	.381	.611	**2.5**	**1.1**	**.6**	—	**9.7**	**6.2**
2016–17	Maccabi	23	**3**	15.4	.444	**.439**	.658	1.1	.5	.1	.0	7.0	4.3
Career		95	7	14.0	.446	.359	.682	1.6	.5	.2	.0	6.0	4.2

== See also ==
- List of select Jewish basketball players
