= Mark Macon =

American basketball player and coach (born 1969)

Temple Owls
- Title: Assistant to the head coach
- League: American Athletic Conference

Personal information
- Born: April 14, 1969 (age 57) Saginaw, Michigan, U.S.
- Listed height: 6 ft 4 in (1.93 m)
- Listed weight: 185 lb (84 kg)

Career information
- High school: Buena Vista (Saginaw, Michigan)
- College: Temple (1987–1991)
- NBA draft: 1991: 1st round, 8th overall pick
- Drafted by: Denver Nuggets
- Playing career: 1991–2001
- Position: Shooting guard / point guard
- Number: 1, 12, 2, 3
- Coaching career: 2003–present

Career history

Playing
- 1991–1993: Denver Nuggets
- 1993–1996: Detroit Pistons
- 1996–1997: Florida Beachdogs
- 1997: Mabo Pistoia
- 1999: Detroit Pistons
- 1999–2000: Oyak Bursa Spor Kulubu
- 2000–2001: Toros de Aragua
- 2001: Atlantic City Seagulls

Coaching
- 2003–2006: Temple (assistant)
- 2006–2007: Georgia State (assistant)
- 2007–2009: Binghamton (assistant)
- 2009–2012: Binghamton
- 2019–present: Temple (asst. to HC)

Career highlights
- NBA All-Rookie Second Team (1992); Consensus second-team All-American (1988); USBWA National Freshman of the Year (1988); Atlantic 10 Player of the Year (1989); 4× First-team All-Atlantic 10 (1988–1991); Robert V. Geasey Trophy (1991); No. 12 retired by Temple Owls; First-team Parade All-American (1987); McDonald's All-American MVP (1987); Mr. Basketball of Michigan (1987)
- Stats at NBA.com
- Stats at Basketball Reference

Mark L. Macon (born April 14, 1969) is an American basketball coach and former professional player. He is the former head coach of Binghamton University and a current staff member at his alma mater, Temple University.

== Playing career ==
Macon attended Buena Vista High School in Saginaw, Michigan. He scored 30 points in a double overtime loss to Beecher High School in the 1985 state championship final. He was named Mr. Basketball of Michigan in 1987.

A 6-foot-4-inch (1.93 m), 185-pound (84 kg) guard, Macon played collegiately at Temple University, alongside future NBA players Aaron McKie and Eddie Jones, and was selected by the Denver Nuggets in the first round (eighth overall) of the 1991 NBA draft.

Macon played for the Nuggets and the Detroit Pistons in six NBA seasons, averaging 6.7 ppg in his career (and missing the entire schedule from 1996 to 1998). Macon also briefly represented the CBA's Florida Beachdogs and Italian club Mabo Pistoia, while still contracted to the Pistons, and Oyak Bursa Spor Kulubu (Turkey), the Atlantic City Seagulls (USBL) and Venezuela's Toros de Aragua, from 1999 to 2001.

== Coaching career ==
Macon began coaching at his alma mater, Temple University, as an assistant from 2003 to 2006. He then moved on to Georgia State University for the 2006–07 season before being hired by Binghamton University as an assistant coach in 2007.

On October 14, 2009, Macon was named Binghamton's interim head coach, replacing Kevin Broadus, who was placed on administrative leave in the wake of the Binghamton University basketball scandal. Two months later, Macon was given a raise from his $57,651 salary to an undisclosed amount.

On April 28, 2010, Binghamton announced that Broadus would not return as head coach and signed Macon to a two-year contract extension to remain interim head basketball coach. Originally, school officials announced that a permanent replacement would not be named until the school hired a new president and athletic director. However, on February 9, 2011, the university announced that Macon signed a contract extension through the 2013–14 season and that the interim tag was being removed. On April 13, 2012, Macon was fired with a 23–70 record in three years at Binghamton, including a 2–29 mark (the worst record in school history) for the 2011–12 season.

On April 12, 2019, Macon was announced as the Assistant to the Head Coach under Aaron McKie at his alma mater, Temple.

== Head coaching record ==
Record table
Season	Team	Overall	Conference	Standing	Postseason
Binghamton (America East Conference) (2009–2012)
2009–10	Binghamton	13–18	8–8	5th	Disqualified
2010–11	Binghamton	8–23	4–12	T–8th	
2011–12	Binghamton	2–29	1–15	9th	
Binghamton:		23–70 (.247)	13–35 (.271)		
Total:		23–70 (.247)			
National champion Postseason invitational champion Conference regular season champion Conference regular season and conference tournament champion Division regular season champion Division regular season and conference tournament champion Conference tournament champion

== See also ==
- List of NCAA Division I men's basketball players with 11 or more steals in a game
