= John Affleck (coach) =

American college sports coach

Biographical details
- Born: 1938 or 1939 (age 87–88)
- Education: Taylor '61

Coaching career (HC unless noted)

Baseball
- 1964–1972: Binghamton

Men's basketball
- 1972–1983: Binghamton

Men's golf
- 1988–2003: Binghamton

Head coaching record
- Overall: Men's basketball: 100-158 (.388); Baseball: 46-56-1 (.451)

Accomplishments and honors

Awards
- 6x District Coach of the Year; 2003 America East Coach of the Year

John A. Affleck is an American former college sports coach. He coached baseball, men's basketball, and men's golf at Binghamton University, in addition to serving as an instructor and administrator. Under him, Binghamton's men's golf program qualified for nine NCAA Tournaments, including one in Division I. He is the only professor of physical education in the State University of New York (SUNY) system to have received the Chancellor's Award for Teaching.

== Coaching career ==
=== Baseball ===
Affleck began his coaching career as the head coach of Harpur College's baseball program. (Harpur became part of the State University of New York system at the start of the 1965–1966 academic year, and was renamed State University of New York at Binghamton, as a result.) Affleck coached the school's baseball program for nine seasons (1964–1972) and had an overall record of 46-56-1. SUNY Binghamton had its first 10-win season under Affleck when it went 10-6 in 1971.

=== Men's basketball ===
At the start of the 1972–1973 academic year, Affleck left the baseball program to become the head coach of SUNY Binghamton's men's basketball program. He was the program's head coach for 11 seasons (1972–1973 to 1982–1983). His career record was 100-158. His teams finished with a winning percentage above .500 in only three of his eleven seasons, and they never finished better than .500 in SUNYAC play. After being fired, he released a statement partially published in the Press and Sun-Bulletin calling his treatment by SUNY director of athletics and physical education Nell Jackson "improper."

=== Men's golf ===
In 1985, Affleck started a club men's golf program at SUNY Binghamton. Under him, men's golf became a varsity sport at the school for the start of the 1988–1989 season. (In 1992, SUNY Binghamton began referring to itself simply as Binghamton University, and the change was reflected in the school's athletic programs.) He served as Binghamton's head coach for 15 seasons (1988–1989 to 2002–2003), in which the team won 69 tournaments and qualified for nine NCAA Tournaments. In seven NCAA Division III tournament appearances (1992–1998), Binghamton's highest finish was fourth place in 1993. The Bearcats also appeared in one Division II and one Division I tournament, as Binghamton's athletic program moved to higher divisions of the NCAA. In the 1999 NCAA Division II Northern Regional, Binghamton finished 11th out of 15 teams. In the 2003 NCAA Division I East Regional, Binghamton finished 22nd out of 27 teams.

Affleck received individual recognition for his golf coaching career. He was named District Coach of the Year six times and the America East Conference Coach of the Year in 2003.

== Head coaching record ==
=== Men's basketball ===
The following is a table of Affleck's yearly records as an NCAA head men's basketball coach.

Record table
Season	Team	Overall	Conference	Standing	Postseason
SUNY Binghamton (Independent (DIII)) (1972–1974)
1972–1973	SUNY Binghamton	11-9			
1973–1974	SUNY Binghamton	9-15			
Division III Independent:		20-24			
Binghamton Bearcats (SUNYAC) (1974–1983)
1974–1975	SUNY Binghamton	13-10	5-5	3rd (East)	
1975–1976	SUNY Binghamton	14-10	4-6	4th (East)	
1976–1977	SUNY Binghamton	9-16	4-6	6th (East)	
1977–1978	SUNY Binghamton	10-14	4-5	t-6th (East)	
1978–1979	SUNY Binghamton	7-17	2-9	6th (East)	
1979–1980	SUNY Binghamton	5-19	1-9	6th (East)	
1980–1981	SUNY Binghamton	10-15	3-7	t-4th (East)	
1981–1982	SUNY Binghamton	3-18	2-8	5th (East)	
1982–1983	SUNY Binghamton	9-15	1-8	6th (East)	
SUNYAC:		80-134	26-63		
Total:		100-158			
National champion Postseason invitational champion Conference regular season champion Conference regular season and conference tournament champion Division regular season champion Division regular season and conference tournament champion Conference tournament champion

=== Baseball ===
The following is a table of Affleck's yearly records as an NCAA head baseball coach.

Record table
Season	Team	Overall	Conference	Standing	Postseason
Harpur/SUNY Binghamton (NCAA College Division Independent) (1964–1972)
1964	Harpur	2-8			
1965	Harpur	5-3-1			
1966	SUNY Binghamton	4-7			
1967	SUNY Binghamton	3-6			
1968	SUNY Binghamton	5-6			
1969	SUNY Binghamton	3-8			
1970	SUNY Binghamton	6-7			
1971	SUNY Binghamton	10-6			
1972	SUNY Binghamton	8-5			
Total:		46-56-1			
National champion Postseason invitational champion Conference regular season champion Conference regular season and conference tournament champion Division regular season champion Division regular season and conference tournament champion Conference tournament champion

== Hall of fame inductions ==
Affleck was inducted into the Binghamton University Athletic Hall of Fame in 2003.
