= Al Walker =

American former basketball coach (born 1959)

Biographical details
- Born: March 19, 1959 (age 67); Queens, New York, U.S.

Playing career
- 1978–1981: Brockport

Coaching career (HC unless noted)
- 1988–1993: Colorado College
- 1993–1996: Cornell
- 1996–2000: Chaminade
- 2000–2007: Binghamton
- 2012–2013: Buffalo (assistant, women's)

Head coaching record
- Overall: 234–279
Medal record
Maccabiah Games
Gold medal – first place	1981 Israel	Men's basketball

Al Walker (born March 19, 1959) is an American former basketball coach. He currently is a pro personnel scout for the Detroit Pistons of the NBA, a position he'd held since 2015. He played college basketball for the Brockport Golden Eagles, won a gold medal with Team USA in the 1981 Maccabiah Games in Israel, and played one year of pro basketball in Israel. He served as the head coach for the Colorado College, Cornell University, Chaminade University of Honolulu and Binghamton University men's basketball teams.

== Biography ==
=== Playing career ===
Walker played college basketball from 1978 to 1981 for the Brockport Golden Eagles. He earned honorable mention on the Small College All-American team. At Brockport, in 2012 he ranked fifth all-time in rebounds (706; 2nd at the time of his graduation) and 20th in scoring (856), while playing only three seasons.

He graduated magna cum laude with a BS in physical education from Brockport State College in 1981, and earned a masters in sports psychology from UNC-Chapel Hill.

Walker is Jewish, and played basketball for Team USA in the 1981 Maccabiah Games in Israel, winning a gold medal with David Blatt, Danny Schayes (the first round draft pick of the NBA's Utah Jazz), and Willie Sims. In 1982 he then played one year of pro basketball in Israel.

=== Coaching career ===
Walker served as the head coach for the Colorado College, Cornell, Chaminade and Binghamton men's basketball teams. Walker was also an advance scout for the Orlando Magic for five seasons until 2012, and an assistant for the University of Buffalo women's basketball team from 2012 to 2013. From 2013 to 2015, he returned to Colorado College where he worked in the Major Gifts office.

== Head coaching record ==
Record table
Season	Team	Overall	Conference	Standing	Postseason
Colorado College Tigers () (1988–1993)
1988–89	Colorado College	7–19			
1989–90	Colorado College	13–12			
1990–91	Colorado College	10–16			
1991–92	Colorado College	22–5			NCAA Division III Second Round
1992–93	Colorado College	17–8			
Colorado College:		69–60			
Cornell Big Red (Ivy League) (1993–1996)
1993–94	Cornell	8–18	3–11	8th	
1994–95	Cornell	9–17	4–10	6th	
1995–96	Cornell	10–16	5–9	5th	
Cornell:		27–51	12–30		
Chaminade Silverswords (Pacific West Conference) (1996–2000)
1996–97	Chaminade	8–19	4–8	5th	
1997–98	Chaminade	12–14	6–6	4th	
1998–99	Chaminade	13–14	7–7	3rd	
1999–00	Chaminade	13–13	7–7	5th	
Chaminade:		46–60	24–28		
Binghamton Bearcats (Independent) (2000–2001)
2000–01	Binghamton	14–14			
Binghamton Bearcats (America East Conference) (2001–2007)
2001–02	Binghamton	9–19	6–10	6th	
2002–03	Binghamton	14–13	9–7	4th	
2003–04	Binghamton	14–16	10–8	5th	
2004–05	Binghamton	12–17	8–10	5th	
2005–06	Binghamton	16–13	12–4	2nd	
2006–07	Binghamton	13–16	6–10	6th	
Binghamton:		92–108	51–49		
Total:		234–279			
