= St. George's Independent School =

Episcopal Church school in Tennessee, US

Coordinates: 35.0833°N 89.7870°W

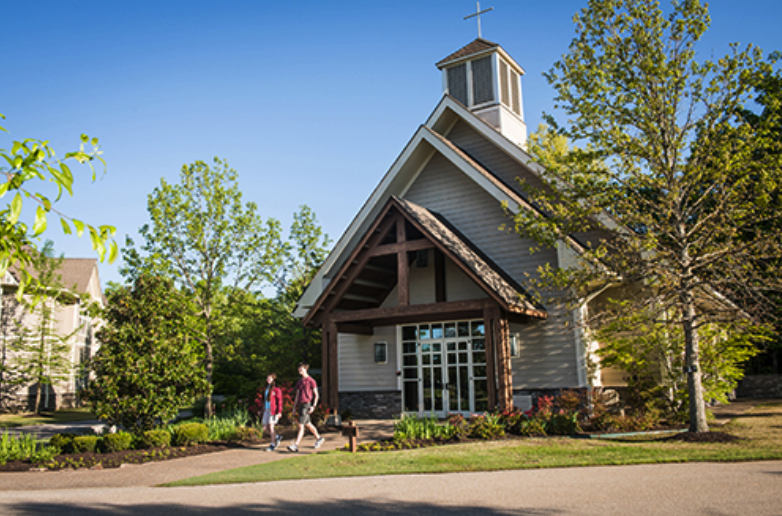
- Agape Chapel on the Collierville campus
- Tennessee; United States

Information
- Type: Private, college-preparatory day
- Motto: Veritas Liberabit Vos (The truth will set you free)
- Religious affiliations: Christianity, Episcopal Church
- Established: 1959
- Head of school: Luke Pruett
- Faculty: 81.0 (on an FTE basis)
- Grades: PK–12
- Gender: Co-educational
- Enrollment: 1,041 (851 non-prekindergarten) (2021–2022)
- Student to teacher ratio: 10.5
- Campuses: Collierville and Germantown
- Colors: Garnet , and Gold
- Mascot: The Gryphon
- Newspaper: The Lodge
- Website: www.sgis.org

St. George's Independent School (SGIS) is a co-educational private school in Memphis, Tennessee affiliated with the Episcopal Church. Founded in 1959, it educates students from prekindergarten (PK) until grade 12 and has two campuses in the Memphis metropolitan area.

== History ==
In 1959, St. George's Episcopal Church started a day school in Germantown with 19 students and two teachers in its rectory. In 1979, the parish and the school moved to new facilities on Poplar Avenue. The school expanded during the 1990s and began raising funds for the acquisition and construction of a Middle and Upper School (grades 6-12) in Collierville. Around the same time, a group of anonymous donors expressed interest in supporting a second elementary school in Memphis for grades PK-5, for families interested in a private school education, but for whom tuition may be out of reach. The St. George's Memphis Campus opened in 2001. The St. George's Collierville Campus opened in 2002.

As a parish school, the school and parish church shared funds and property. In the case of St. George's, there were concerns the lines were blurred, and the school and church decided to legally separate. The Poplar Avenue site was sold to the school and the parish church moved to another location. In 2004, the school name was changed to "St. George's Independent School" to reflect this change of status.

The school administration and board of trustees wished to maintain the Episcopal identity despite not having any legal ties with a parish or the diocese. The diocese allowed St. George's continue using the Book of Common Prayer and the school continued to have an unofficial affiliation.

In 2016, St. George's officially reaffirmed its status as an Episcopal school.

In February 2025, the St. George's Board of Trustees announced the two lower school campuses will unite on one campus in Germantown, starting with the 2025-2026 school year.

== Organizational structure ==
St. George's has four divisions: Early Childhood (grades PK-1), Elementary (grades 2-5), Middle School (grades 6-8), and Upper School (grades 9-12). It also operates Little Georgies Infant and Early Learning program for children, aged 6 weeks to 2 years, at the Lower School campus in Germantown.

== Academics ==
In 2023 and 2024, St. George's received "platinum with access" distinction—the highest level—for the College Board's AP School Honor Roll, which recognizes schools whose Advanced Placement programs deliver results for students.

== Athletics ==
St. George's competes in the Division II-A (71 Teams 6th-12th grade), West Region A of the Tennessee Secondary School Athletic Association (TSSAA).

There are 21 varsity sports, including baseball, basketball, cheer, cross country, football, golf, lacrosse, soccer, softball, swimming, tennis, water polo, and wrestling.

Since 2006, with the first graduating class, St. George’s has amassed 63 state championships, with 165+ students playing at the collegiate level.
