= 2008–09 Duke Blue Devils men's basketball team =

American college basketball season

2008–09 Duke Blue Devils men's basketball

ACC Tournament champions Coaches vs. Cancer Classic champions

NCAA tournament, Sweet Sixteen
- Conference: Atlantic Coast Conference

Ranking
- Coaches: No. 11
- AP: No. 6
- Record: 30–7 (11–5 ACC)
- Head coach: Mike Krzyzewski (29th season)
- Assistant coaches: Chris Collins; Steve Wojciechowski; Nate James
- Home arena: Cameron Indoor Stadium

2008–09 ACC men's basketball standings
	Conf.				Overall
Team	W		L	PCT	W		L	PCT
No. 2 North Carolina	13	–	3	.813	34	–	4	.895
No. 6 Duke†	11	–	5	.688	30	–	7	.811
No. 12 Wake Forest	11	–	5	.688	24	–	7	.774
No. 16 Florida State	10	–	6	.625	25	–	10	.714
No. 24 Clemson	9	–	7	.563	23	–	9	.719
Boston College	9	–	7	.563	22	–	12	.647
Maryland	7	–	9	.438	21	–	14	.600
Virginia Tech	7	–	9	.438	19	–	15	.559
Miami (FL)	7	–	9	.438	19	–	13	.594
NC State	6	–	10	.375	16	–	14	.533
Virginia	4	–	12	.250	10	–	18	.357
Georgia Tech	2	–	14	.125	12	–	19	.387
† 2009 ACC tournament winner Rankings from AP Poll

The 2008–09 Duke Blue Devils men's basketball team represented Duke University in the 2008–09 NCAA Division I men's basketball season. The team's head coach was Mike Krzyzewski, who served for his 29th year. The team played its home games in Cameron Indoor Stadium in Durham, North Carolina. The Blue Devils captured the ACC Championship by defeating Florida State in the championship game in Atlanta.

== Pre-season ==
The 2007–08 Duke Blue Devils finished the season 28–6 (13–3), placed second in the ACC regular season standings, and lost in the second round of the NCAA tournament. Earlier in the season, the squad reached as high as #2 in the Coaches' Poll with only one loss. Some late season losses caused them to finish the regular season ranked #9 in the country and #2 in the Atlantic Coast Conference. Duke then lost in the semifinals in the ACC tournament to the Clemson Tigers. Duke was given a #2 seed in the NCAA tournament. After narrowly defeating #15 Belmont, Duke lost 73–67 to the #7 West Virginia Mountaineers.

=== Recruiting ===
College recruiting
Name	Hometown	School	Height	Weight	Commit date
Olek Czyz; PF	Reno, Nevada	Reno	6 ft 7 in (2.01 m)	240 lb (110 kg)	Sep 26, 2007
Olek Czyz; PF	Recruit ratings: Scout: Rivals: (92)				
Miles Plumlee; PF	Warsaw, Indiana	Christ School (NC)	6 ft 10 in (2.08 m)	220 lb (100 kg)	May 1, 2008
Miles Plumlee; PF	Recruit ratings: Scout: Rivals: (96)				
Elliot Williams; SG	Memphis, Tennessee	St. George's	6 ft 4 in (1.93 m)	180 lb (82 kg)	Nov 1, 2007
Elliot Williams; SG	Recruit ratings: Scout: Rivals: (96)				
Overall recruit ranking: Scout: 13 Rivals: 27 ESPN: 23
Note: In many cases, Scout, Rivals, 247Sports, On3, and ESPN may conflict in their listings of height and weight.; In these cases, the average was taken. ESPN grades are on a 100-point scale.; Sources: "Duke Basketball Commitments". Rivals.; "2008 Duke Basketball Commits". Scout.; "ESPN". ESPN.; "Scout.com Team Recruiting Rankings". Scout.; "2008 Team Ranking". Rivals.

On September 26, 2007, forward Olek Czyz committed to Duke University. Czyz is a 6–7 Poland native who has spent the last three years in Reno, Nevada. Both Scout and Rivals.com listed him as the 27th best power forward in the nation. However, Scout.com had him 80th overall, while Rivals.com had him back at 102nd. As a junior at Reno High School, Czyz averaged 18.7 points and 8.3 rebounds per game, leading Reno to a 24–6 record. In his sophomore year, Olek had a ten-point and six rebound average, while leading his team to a state championship. Other schools to make offers to Czyz were Arizona State, Colorado State, Florida, Kentucky, Louisville, Nevada, Pepperdine, and Washington State.

On the first day of November, the Blue Devils received a commitment from Elliot Williams. The 6–4 shooting guard from Memphis, Tennessee was listed as the number 3 shooting guard in the country by Rivals.com, while Scout.com had him as the number 4 shooting guard and the number 14 overall prospect in the country. Williams spent high school at St. George's where he averaged 25 points, seven rebounds, and six assists per game. In his junior year, Elliot averaged 22 points and six rebounds per contest, while leading his team to a state championship. Williams turned down offers from Clemson, Memphis, Tennessee, Vanderbilt, and Virginia.

Power forward Miles Plumlee, a 6–10 native of Warsaw, Indiana, who attended high school in Arden, North Carolina, committed to the Blue Devils on May 1, 2008. Miles, who is the older brother of 2009 commitment Mason Plumlee, had signed a letter of intent to Stanford University, but after head coach Trent Johnson took the coaching job at Louisiana State, Plumlee requested and was granted a release. Plumlee is rated as the 17th best power forward of the 2008 recruiting class by Scouts.com, while Rivals has him ranked 29th at forward and 101st overall.

=== Offseason changes ===
The only senior Duke lost from their 2007–08 squad was DeMarcus Nelson who graduated. Nelson was projected to go somewhere in the late second round in the 2008 NBA draft, but instead went undrafted. On September 9, 2008, Nelson was signed by the Golden State Warriors.

Joe Alleva, the Duke Athletics Director, interviewed for the athletics director job at Louisiana State on April 1, and was offered for the position on April 3. After 10 years as Duke's athletics director, Alleva took the job and is scheduled to start on July 1. At Duke a twelve-person committee, assembled by Duke President, Richard H. Brodhead, searched for a new athletics director. Joe Alleva said in an interview that he would do anything to help in the search. On May 30, Brodhead announced that the Duke had hired former Notre Dame athletics director Kevin White. Coach Mike Krzyzewski said the White "is one of the most respected people in intercollegiate athletics" and brings " wealth of experience and is someone who people admire".

Duke forward Taylor King decided to transfer to Villanova University in April 2008. As a freshman at Duke, King played in all 34 games, averaging 5.9 points and 2.0 rebounds per game. He had 43 three-pointers that season, putting him eighth all-time against Duke freshmen. When announcing his transfer, King told reporters "Nothing against Duke, but it's time for a change. I needed to explore other places. Villanova is a true family atmosphere where everyone's got each other's back." Per NCAA regulations, King will have to sit out a season.

On April 26, associate head coach Johnny Dawkins announced that he would be leaving the Blue Devils, to take over the head coaching spot at Stanford. Dawkins was a member of the 1986 Duke team that lost in the finals to Louisville. After nine seasons in the NBA, Dawkins was hired as an assistant coach during the 1998–99 season. Two years later he was promoted to associate head coach, a job he's held for nine years.

It was announced on May 5, that Nate James would replace Johnny Dawkins as an assistant coach. James was a captain on the 2000-01 Duke Blue Devils men's basketball team that won a national championship. After turning pro, James played in the Philippines, France, Hungary, Japan and the Netherlands. In 2004, James participated in the training camp of the Philadelphia 76ers, but did not make it onto the team. During the winter of 2007–2008, he was hired to oversee operations at the Duke's new practice facility.

== Roster ==
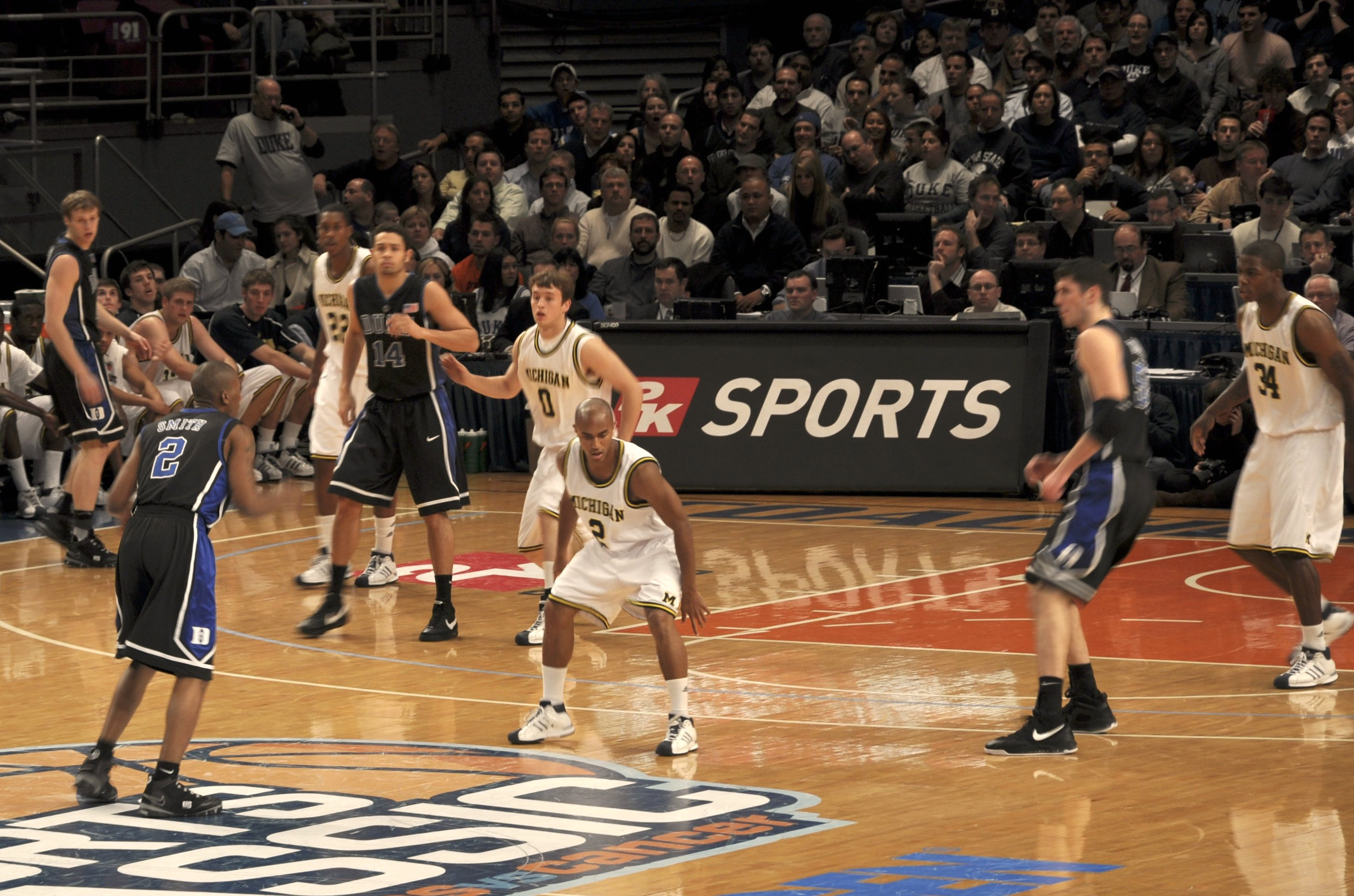
Smith (2), McClure (14), Zoubek (55), and Pocius (5) set up an offensive set vs. Michigan at the 2k Sports Classic Final (2008-11-21).

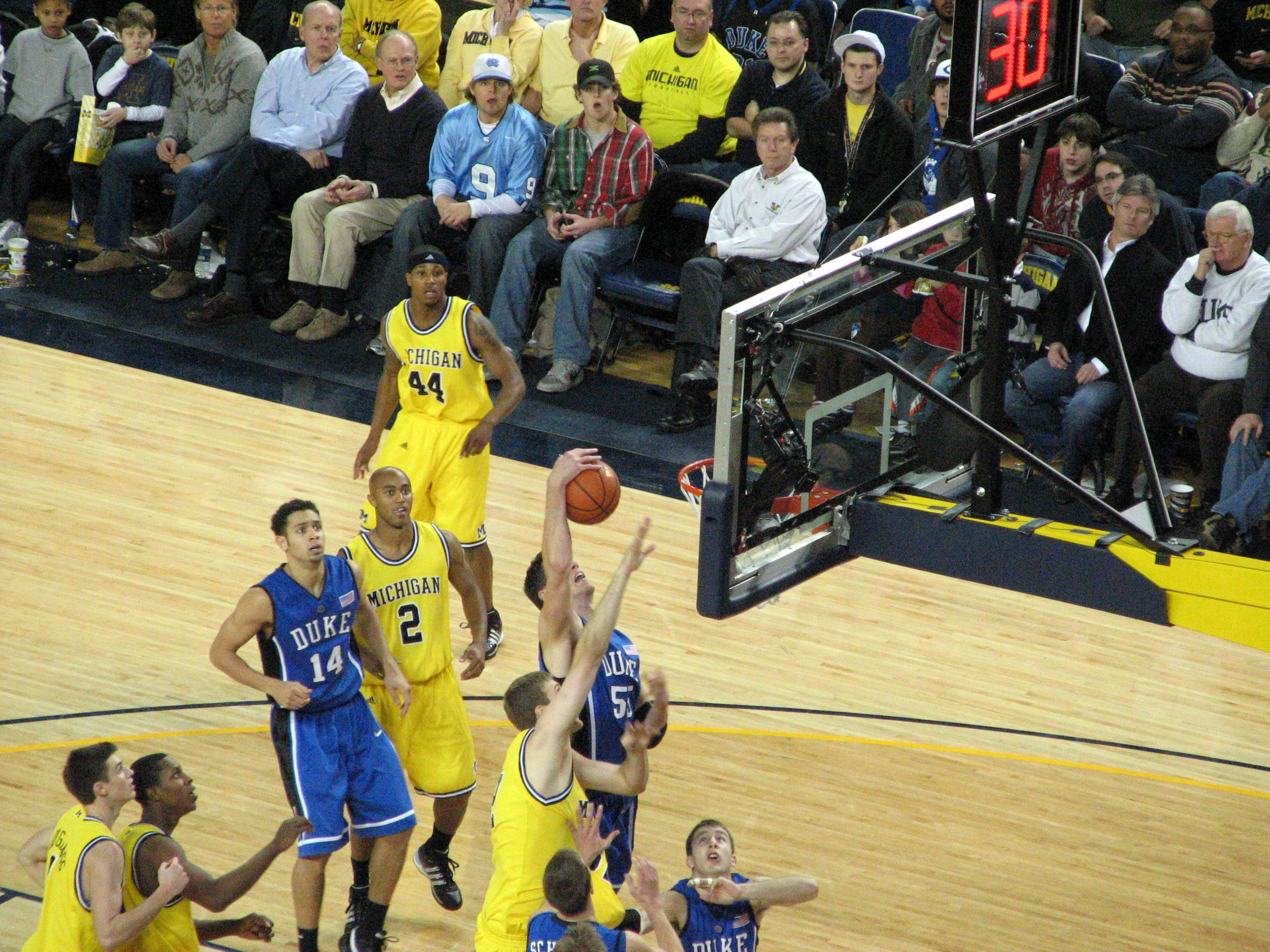
Zoubek (55) grabs a rebound at Michigan (2008-12-06).

2008–09 Duke Blue Devils men's basketball team
Players
Coaches

Pos.	#	Name	Height	Weight	Year	Previous school	Hometown
F	13	Olek Czyz	6 ft 7 in (2.01 m)	240 lb (109 kg)	Fr	Reno	Reno, NV
G	41	Jordan Davidson	6 ft 1 in (1.85 m)	180 lb (82 kg)	Sr	Blair Academy	Melbourne, AR
G	15	Gerald Henderson Jr.	6 ft 4 in (1.93 m)	210 lb (95 kg)	Jr	Episcopal Academy	Merion, PA
F	51	Steve Johnson	6 ft 5 in (1.96 m)	195 lb (88 kg)	So	Cheyenne Mountain	Colorado Springs, CO
F	14	David McClure	6 ft 6 in (1.98 m)	200 lb (91 kg)	Sr	Trinity Catholic	Ridgefield, CT
G	3	Greg Paulus	6 ft 1 in (1.85 m)	185 lb (84 kg)	Sr	Christian Brothers	Syracuse, NY
F	21	Miles Plumlee	6 ft 10 in (2.08 m)	220 lb (100 kg)	Fr	Christ School	Warsaw, IN
G/F	5	Martynas Pocius	6 ft 5 in (1.96 m)	190 lb (86 kg)	Sr	Holderness School	Vilnius, Lithuania
G	30	Jon Scheyer	6 ft 5 in (1.96 m)	180 lb (82 kg)	Jr	Glenbrook North	Northbrook, IL
F	12	Kyle Singler	6 ft 8 in (2.03 m)	220 lb (100 kg)	So	South Medford	Medford, OR
G	2	Nolan Smith	6 ft 2 in (1.88 m)	180 lb (82 kg)	So	Oak Hill Academy (VA)	Upper Marlboro, MD
F	42	Lance Thomas	6 ft 8 in (2.03 m)	220 lb (100 kg)	Jr	St. Benedict's Prep	Scotch Plains, NJ
G	20	Elliot Williams	6 ft 4 in (1.93 m)	180 lb (82 kg)	Fr	St. George's	Memphis, TN
C	55	Brian Zoubek	7 ft 1 in (2.16 m)	260 lb (118 kg)	Jr	Haddonfield Memorial	Haddonfield, NJ

Head coach

Mike Krzyzewski

Assistant coach(es)

Chris Collins
Steve Wojciechowski
Nate James

Legend

- (C) Team captain
- (S) Suspended
- (I) Ineligible
- (W) Walk-on
- Injured
- Current redshirt

== Rankings ==
Ranking movements Legend: ██ Increase in ranking ██ Decrease in ranking
	Week																			
Poll	Pre Oct 31	1 Nov 17	2 Nov 24	3 Dec 1	4 Dec 8	5 Dec 15	6 Dec 22	7 Dec 29	8 Jan 5	9 Jan 12	10 Jan 19	11 Jan 26	12 Feb 2	13 Feb 9	14 Feb 16	15 Feb 23	16 Mar 2	17 Mar 9	18	Final
AP	8	10	7	4	7	6	5	5	2	3	2	1	4	6	9	7	7	9	6	N/A
Coaches	5	5	5	4	7	6	5	5	2	2	2	1	3	5	9	7	7	8	5	11

== Schedule ==
Date time, TV	Rank^{#}	Opponent^{#}	Result	Record	Site (attendance) city, state
Sat, Oct 18*; 1:00 p.m.		Blue/White; Scrimmage			Cameron Indoor Stadium; Durham, NC
Exhibition
Sat, Oct 25*; 1:00 p.m.		Virginia Union	W 114–50		Cameron Indoor Stadium; Durham, NC
Wed, Nov 05*; 7:00 p.m.		Lenoir-Rhyne	W 95–42		Cameron Indoor Stadium; Durham, NC
Regular season
Mon, Nov 10*; 7:00 p.m., ESPNU	No. 8	Presbyterian; Coaches Vs. Cancer Classic	W 80–49	1–0	Cameron Indoor Stadium (9,314); Durham, NC
Tue, Nov 11*; 9:05 p.m., ESPNU	No. 8	Georgia Southern; Coaches Vs. Cancer Classic	W 97–54	2–0	Cameron Indoor Stadium (9,314); Durham, NC
Sun, Nov 16*; 4:30 p.m., ESPNU	No. 8	Rhode Island	W 82–79	3–0	Cameron Indoor Stadium (9,314); Durham, NC
Thu, Nov 20*; 7:00 p.m., ESPN2	No. 10	vs. Southern Illinois; Coaches Vs. Cancer Classic	W 83–58	4–0	Madison Square Garden (9,440); New York, NY
Fri, Nov 21*; 7:30 p.m., ESPN2	No. 10	vs. Michigan; Coaches Vs. Cancer Classic	W 71–56	5–0	Madison Square Garden (12,543); New York, NY
Sun, Nov 23*; 1:00 p.m., FSNS/NESN	No. 10	Montana	W 78–58	6–0	Cameron Indoor Stadium (9,314); Durham, NC
Fri, Nov 28*; 3:00 p.m., ESPN	No. 7	Duquesne	W 95–72	7–0	Cameron Indoor Stadium (9,314); Durham, NC
Tue, Dec 02*; 9:00 p.m., ESPN	No. 4	at No. 9 Purdue; ACC – Big Ten Challenge	W 76–60	8–0	Mackey Arena (14,123); West Lafayette, IN
Sat, Dec 06*; 3:30 p.m., ESPN	No. 4	at Michigan	L 73–81	8–1	Crisler Arena (13,751); Ann Arbor, MI
Wed, Dec 17*; 7:30 p.m., ESPN2	No. 6	UNC Asheville	W 99–56	9–1	Cameron Indoor Stadium (9,314); Durham, NC
Sat, Dec 20*; 2:00 p.m., CBS	No. 6	vs. No. 7 Xavier	W 82–64	10–1	Izod Center (14,818); East Rutherford, NJ
Wed, Dec 31*; 4:00 p.m., ESPN2	No. 5	Loyola, Md	W 92–51	11–1	Cameron Indoor Stadium (9,314); Durham, NC
Sun, Jan 04; 7:45 p.m., FSN	No. 5	Virginia Tech	W 69–44	12–1 (1–0)	Cameron Indoor Stadium (9,314); Durham, NC
Wed, Jan 07*; 7:00 p.m., ESPN	No. 2	Davidson	W 79–67	13–1 (1–0)	Cameron Indoor Stadium (9,314); Durham, NC
Sat, Jan 10; 2:00 p.m., ESPN	No. 2	at Florida State	W 66–58	14–1 (2–0)	Donald L. Tucker Center (12,100); Tallahassee, FL
Wed, Jan 14; 7:00 p.m., ESPN	No. 3	at Georgia Tech	W 70–56	15–1 (3–0)	Alexander Memorial Coliseum (9,035); Atlanta, GA
Sat, Jan 17*; 1:30 p.m., CBS	No. 3	No. 13 Georgetown	W 76–67	16–1 (3–0)	Cameron Indoor Stadium (9,314); Durham, NC
Tue, Jan 20; 8:00 p.m., ESPN2/Raycom	No. 2	NC State	W 73–56	17–1 (4–0)	Cameron Indoor Stadium (9,314); Durham, NC
Sat, Jan 24; 12:00 p.m., ESPN	No. 2	Maryland; Duke–Maryland rivalry	W 85–44	18–1 (5–0)	Cameron Indoor Stadium (9,314); Durham, NC
Wed, Jan 28; 7:00 p.m., ESPN	No. 1	at No. 6 Wake Forest	L 68–70	18–2 (5–1)	LJVM Coliseum (14,665); Winston-Salem, NC
Sun, Feb 1; 2:00 p.m., FSN/ESPN3	No. 1	Virginia	W 79–54	19–2 (6–1)	Cameron Indoor Stadium (9,314); Durham, NC
Wed, Feb 4; 9:00 p.m., ESPN	No. 4	at No. 10 Clemson	L 47–74	19–3 (6–2)	Littlejohn Coliseum (10,000); Clemson, SC
Sat, Feb 07; 1:30 p.m., Raycom	No. 4	Miami (FL)	W 78–75 ^{OT}	20–3 (7–2)	Cameron Indoor Stadium (9,314); Durham, NC
Thu, Feb 12; 9:00 p.m., ESPN/Raycom	No. 6	No. 3 North Carolina; Carolina–Duke rivalry	L 87–101	20–4 (7–3)	Cameron Indoor Stadium (9,314); Durham, NC
Sun, Feb 15; 5:30 p.m., FSN	No. 6	at Boston College	L 74–80	20–5 (7–4)	Conte Forum (8,606); Chestnut Hill, MA
Thu, Feb 19*; 7:00 p.m., ESPN	No. 9	at St. John's; Aeropostale Classic	W 76–69	21–5 (7–4)	Madison Square Garden (13,800); New York, NY
Sun, Feb 22; 7:45 p.m., FSN	No. 9	No. 8 Wake Forest	W 101–91	22–5 (8–4)	Cameron Indoor Stadium (9,314); Durham, NC
Wed, Feb 25; 9:00 p.m., ESPN	No. 7	at Maryland	W 78–67	23–5 (9–4)	Comcast Center (17,950); College Park, MD
Sat, Feb 28; 3:30 p.m., ABC	No. 7	at Virginia Tech	W 72–65	24–5 (10–4)	Cassell Coliseum (9,847); Blacksburg, VA
Tue, Mar 3; 8:00 p.m., Raycom	No. 7	No. 24 Florida State	W 84–81	25–5 (11–4)	Cameron Indoor Stadium (9,314); Durham, NC
Sun, Mar 8; 4:00 p.m., CBS	No. 7	at No. 2 North Carolina; Carolina–Duke rivalry	L 71–79	25–6 (11–5)	Dean E. Smith Center (21,750); Chapel Hill, NC
ACC Tournament
Fri, Mar 13; 9:30 p.m., Raycom/ESPN2	No. 9	vs. Boston College	W 66–65	26–6	Georgia Dome (26,352); Atlanta, GA
Sat, Mar 14; 3:30 p.m., Raycom/ESPN2	No. 9	vs. Maryland	W 67–61	27–6	Georgia Dome (26,352); Atlanta, GA
Sun, Mar 15; 1:00 p.m., Raycom/ESPN2	No. 9	vs. No. 22 Florida State	W 79–69	28–6	Georgia Dome (26,352); Atlanta, GA
NCAA tournament
Thurs, Mar 19; 9:40 p.m., CBS	No. 6 (2)	vs. No. (15) Binghamton; First Round	W 86–62	29–6	Greensboro Coliseum (20,001); Greensboro, NC
Sat, Mar 21; 8:15 p.m., CBS	No. 6 (2)	vs. No. (7) Texas; Second Round	W 74–69	30–6	Greensboro Coliseum (22,479); Greensboro, NC
Thurs., Mar 27; 10:08 p.m., CBS	No. 6 (2)	vs. No. 11 (3) Villanova; Sweet Sixteen	L 54–77	30–7	TD Banknorth Garden (18,831); Boston, MA
*Non-conference game. ^{#}Rankings from AP Poll. (#) Tournament seedings in parentheses. All times are in Eastern Time.

== See also ==
- 2008–09 Duke Blue Devils women's basketball team
