= 2008–09 Mid-American Conference men's basketball season =

- League: NCAA Division I
- Sport: Basketball
- Teams: 12

Regular season
- League champions: Bowling Green and Buffalo
- Season MVP: Michael Bramos

Tournament
- Champions: Akron
- Runners-up: Buffalo
- Finals MVP: Nate Linhart

Mid-American men's basketball seasons
- ← 2007–08 2009–10 →

2008–09 Mid-American Conference men's basketball standings
	Conf.				Overall
Team	W		L	PCT	W		L	PCT
East
Bowling Green	11	–	5	.688	19	–	14	.576
Buffalo	11	–	5	.688	21	–	12	.636
Miami	10	–	6	.625	17	–	13	.567
Akron †	10	–	6	.625	23	–	13	.639
Kent State	10	–	6	.625	19	–	15	.559
Ohio	7	–	9	.438	15	–	17	.469
West
Ball State	7	–	9	.438	14	–	17	.452
Central Michigan	7	–	9	.438	12	–	19	.387
Western Michigan	7	–	9	.438	10	–	21	.323
Eastern Michigan	6	–	10	.375	8	–	24	.250
Northern Illinois	5	–	11	.313	10	–	20	.333
Toledo	5	–	11	.313	7	–	25	.219
† Conference tournament winner Rankings from AP Poll

The 2008–09 Mid-American Conference men's basketball season began with practices in October 2008, followed by the start of the 2008–09 NCAA Division I men's basketball season in November. Conference play began in January 2009 and concluded in March 2009. Bowling Green and Buffalo shared the regular season title with a conference record of 11–5. Fifth-seeded Akron defeated Buffalo in the MAC tournament final and represented the MAC in the NCAA tournament where they lost in the first round to Gonzaga.

== Preseason awards ==
The preseason poll was announced by the league office on October 30, 2008.

=== Preseason men's basketball poll ===
(First place votes in parentheses)

==== East Division ====
1. Kent State (16) 124
2. Miami (6) 109
3. Bowling Green 70
4. Akron 67
5. Ohio 66
6. Buffalo 35

==== West Division ====
1. Western Michigan (15) 122
2. Eastern Michigan (7) 105
3. Central Michigan 79
4. Toledo 71
5. Ball State 55
6. Northern Illinois 39

==== Tournament champs ====
Kent State (11), Miami (7), Bowling Green (2), Eastern Michigan (2)

=== Honors ===
Honor	Recipient
Preseason All-MAC East	Nate Linhart, Akron
Preseason All-MAC East	Nate Miller, Bowling Green
Preseason All-MAC East	Al Fisher, Kent State
Preseason All-MAC East	Michael Bramos, Miami
Preseason All-MAC East	Jerome Tillman, Ohio
Preseason All-MAC West	Anthony Newell, Ball State
Preseason All-MAC West	Carlos Medlock, Eastern Michigan
Preseason All-MAC West	Darion Anderson, Northern Illinois
Preseason All-MAC West	Tyrone Kent, Toledo
Preseason All-MAC West	David Kool, Western Michigan

== Postseason ==
=== Postseason awards ===
1. Coach of the Year: Louis Orr, Bowling Green
2. Player of the Year: Michael Bramos, Miami
3. Freshman of the Year: Jarrod Jones, Ball State
4. Defensive Player of the Year: Nate Linhart, Akron
5. Sixth Man of the Year: Brett McKnight, Akron

=== Honors ===
Honor	Recipient
Postseason All-MAC First Team	Michael Bramos, Miami, G/F
Postseason All-MAC First Team	Al Fisher, Kent State, G
Postseason All-MAC First Team	Nate Miller, Bowling Green, F
Postseason All-MAC First Team	Rodney Pierce, Buffalo, G
Postseason All-MAC First Team	Jerome Tillman, Ohio, F
Postseason All-MAC Second Team	Darion Anderson, Northern Illinois G
Postseason All-MAC Second Team	Brandon Bowdry, Eastern Michigan F
Postseason All-MAC Second Team	Brett McKnight, Akron, F
Postseason All-MAC Second Team	Tyrone Kent, Toledo, G
Postseason All-MAC Second Team	David Kool, Western Michigan, G
Postseason All-MAC Honorable Mention	Mike Allen, Ohio, G
Postseason All-MAC Honorable Mention	Tyler Dierkers, Miami, F
Postseason All-MAC Honorable Mention	Greg Gamble, Buffalo, G
Postseason All-MAC Honorable Mention	Jarrod Jones, Ball State, F
Postseason All-MAC Honorable Mention	Brandon Lampley, Ball State, G
Postseason All-MAC Honorable Mention	Nate Linhart, Akron, F
Postseason All-MAC Honorable Mention	Chris McKnight, Akron, F
Postseason All-MAC Honorable Mention	Brian Moten, Bowling Green, G
Postseason All-MAC Honorable Mention	Chris Singletary, Kent State, G/F
Postseason All-MAC Honorable Mention	Marcus Van, Central Michigan, F/C
All-MAC Freshman Team	Anthony Hitchens, Akron, G
All-MAC Freshman Team	Jarrod Jones, Ball State, F
All-MAC Freshman Team	Mike DiNunno, Northern Illinois, G
All-MAC Freshman Team	Steven Coleman, Ohio, G
All-MAC Freshman Team	Flenard Whitfield, Western Michigan, F

== See also ==
2008–09 Mid-American Conference women's basketball season
