= 2008–09 Western Michigan Broncos men's basketball team =

American college basketball season

2008–09 Western Michigan Broncos men's basketball

MAC West Division Co-Champions
- Conference: Mid-American Conference
- West
- Record: 10–21 (7–9 MAC)
- Head coach: Steve Hawkins
- Assistant coaches: Bacari Alexander; Rick Carter; Andy Hipsher
- Home arena: University Arena

2008–09 Mid-American Conference men's basketball standings
	Conf.				Overall
Team	W		L	PCT	W		L	PCT
East
Bowling Green	11	–	5	.688	19	–	14	.576
Buffalo	11	–	5	.688	21	–	12	.636
Miami	10	–	6	.625	17	–	13	.567
Akron †	10	–	6	.625	23	–	13	.639
Kent State	10	–	6	.625	19	–	15	.559
Ohio	7	–	9	.438	15	–	17	.469
West
Ball State	7	–	9	.438	14	–	17	.452
Central Michigan	7	–	9	.438	12	–	19	.387
Western Michigan	7	–	9	.438	10	–	21	.323
Eastern Michigan	6	–	10	.375	8	–	24	.250
Northern Illinois	5	–	11	.313	10	–	20	.333
Toledo	5	–	11	.313	7	–	25	.219
† Conference tournament winner Rankings from AP Poll

The 2008–09 Western Michigan Broncos men's basketball team was a National Collegiate Athletic Association Division I college basketball team representing Western Michigan University. The team was the defending Mid-American Conference (MAC) West Division champion and was picked to finish first in the MAC West Division by members of the MAC News Media Association.

WMU opened the season losing to Texas Christian in the first game of the inaugural Charleston Classic.

In February 2009, redshirt freshman Justin Hairston decided to transfer.

== Roster ==
No.	Name	Pos.	Height	Weight	Year	Hometown (Previous school)
40	Luke Adaline	C	7'0"	262	Fr.	Tawas City, MI (Tawas)
32	Muhammed Conteh	F	6'7"	236	Fr.	Bloomington, IN (Providence School)
5	Mike Douglas	G	6'0"	162	Fr.	Detroit, MI (Finney)
4	Derek Drews	F	6'5"	214	Sr.	Elkhart, IN (Elkhart Central)
34	Shawntes Gary	G	6'2"	210	Sr.	Elkhart, IN (Concord)
13	Justin Hairston	F	6'5"	205	Fr.-R	Fort Wayne, IN (Fort Wayne South)
23	David Kool	G	6'3"	205	Jr.	Grand Rapids, MI (South Christian)
24	Donald Lawson	C	6'9"	241	Jr.	Chicago, IL (Leo Catholic)
20	LaMarcus Lowe	F/C	6'11"	200	Fr.	Flint, MI (Northwestern)
3	Martelle McLemore	G	6'5"	205	Jr.	Detroit, MI (Consortium Prep)
10	Troy Peter	G	6'4"	203	Fr.	Stevensville, MI (Lakeshore)
22	Michael Redell	G	6'0"	183	Sr.	Rockford, MI (Cleveland State)
12	Andre Ricks	G	5'9"	160	Sr.	Detroit, MI (Pershing)
1	Demetrius Ward	G	6'2"	215	Fr.	Detroit, MI (Pershing)
33	Flenard Whitfield	F	6'7"	222	Fr.	Detroit, MI (Martin Luther King)
15	Alex Wolf	G	5'11"	193	So.	Parchment, MI (Parchment)

== Awards ==
- David Kool
  - Mid-American Conference Player of the Week (3)
    - Week 1 – Led Charleston Classic in scoring and was named to the All-Tournament Team after putting up 24.3 points, 4.3 rebounds, 4.0 assists and 1.3 steals per game in three losses.
    - Week 6 – 19 points, three rebounds, one assist and one steal in only 28 minutes in 68–55 win over Iona.
    - Week 9 – 26 points and a career-high nine rebounds, three assists and two steals in victory over Central Michigan.
  - Mid-American Conference Scholar–Athlete of the Week, January 11
  - Charleston Classic All-Tournament Team
  - Academic All-District IV First Team

== Schedule ==
Date time, TV	Rank^{#}	Opponent^{#}	Result	Record	Site (attendance) city, state
Non-conference regular season
November 14, 2008*; 12:30pm		vs. TCU; Charleston Classic	L 63–67	0–1	Carolina First Arena (N/A); Charleston, SC
November 15, 2008*; 5:30pm		vs. Hofstra; Charleston Classic	L 68–71 ^{OT}	0–2	Carolina First Arena (N/A); Charleston, SC
November 16, 2008*; 10:30am		vs. SIU Edwardsville; Charleston Classic	L 72–83	0–3	Carolina First Arena (N/A); Charleston, SC
November 18, 2008*; 7:30pm, Fox Sports Detroit		Detroit	W 71–58	1–3	University Arena (2,848); Kalamazoo, MI
November 22, 2008*; 2:00pm		Loyola	L 51–54	1–4	University Arena (2,816); Kalamazoo, MI
November 25, 2008*; 8:00pm		at Sam Houston State	W 65–62	2–4	Johnson Coliseum (1,262); Huntsville, TX
November 29, 2008*; 2:00pm		IUPUI	L 68–76	2–5	University Arena (2,574); Kalamazoo, MI
December 4, 2008*; 7:30pm		at VCU	L 62–79	2–6	Stuart C. Siegel Center (4,487); Richmond, VA
December 6, 2008*; 12:30pm		at Holy Cross	L 63–69	2–7	Hart Center (2,291); Worcester, MA
December 14, 2008*; 7:00pm		at UNLV	L 61–70	2–8	Orleans Arena (6,701); Las Vegas, NV
December 18, 2008*; 8:00pm		Iona	W 68–55	3–8	University Arena (2,574); Kalamazoo, MI
December 22, 2008*; 8:05pm		at Southern Illinois	L 46–64	3–9	SIU Arena (5,324); Carbondale, IL
December 30, 2008*; 6:00pm		UW–Green Bay	L 51–61	3–10	University Arena (3,306); Kalamazoo, MI
MAC regular season
January 11, 2009; 6:00pm		at Central Michigan; Michigan MAC Trophy	W 72–63	4–10 (1–0)	Rose Arena (1,741); Mount Pleasant, MI
January 14, 2009; 7:00pm		Toledo	W 70–52	5–10 (2–0)	University Arena (2,518); Kalamazoo, MI
January 17, 2009; 2:00pm		Northern Illinois	W 71–52	6–10 (3–0)	University Arena (3,128); Kalamazoo, MI
January 20, 2008; 7:00pm		at Ball State	L 44–50	6–11 (3–1)	John E. Worthen Arena (3,018); Muncie, IN
January 24, 2009; 4:00pm		at Eastern Michigan; Michigan MAC Trophy	W 53–45	7–11 (4–1)	Convocation Center (1,663); Ypsilanti, MI
January 27, 2009; 7:00pm		Buffalo	L 71–74	7–12 (4–2)	University Arena (2,832); Kalamazoo, MI
January 31, 2009; 2:00pm		Kent State	L 47–65	7–13 (4–3)	University Arena (3,234); Kalamazoo, MI
February 4, 2009; 7:00pm		at Bowling Green	L 61–68	7–14 (4–4)	Anderson Arena (1,865); Bowling Green, OH
February 8, 2009; 2:00pm		at Akron	L 63–87	7–15 (4–5)	James A. Rhodes Arena (2,504); Akron, OH
February 11, 2009; 7:00pm		Ohio	W 76–62	8–15 (5–5)	University Arena (2,758); Kalamazoo, MI
February 14, 2009; 7:00pm, ESPNU		at Miami	L 46–64	8–16 (5–6)	Millett Hall (3,986); Oxford, OH
February 18, 2009; 7:00pm		Eastern Michigan; Michigan MAC Trophy	W 46–38	9–16 (6–6)	University Arena (3,122); Kalamazoo, MI
February 21, 2009*; 2:00pm		Eastern Illinois; Bracket Busters	L 57–59	9–17	University Arena (2,894); Kalamazoo, MI
February 25, 2009; 8:00pm		at Northern Illinois	L 63–78	9–18 (6–7)	Convocation Center (1,394); DeKalb, IL
February 28, 2009; 7:00pm		at Toledo	L 62–63	9–19 (6–8)	Savage Arena (7,036); Toledo, OH
March 4, 2009; 7:00pm, Fox Sports Detroit Plus		Ball State	W 84–82 ^{OT}	10–19 (7–8)	University Arena (2,616); Kalamazoo, MI
March 8, 2009; 2:00pm		Central Michigan; Michigan MAC Trophy	L 68–71	10–20 (7–9)	University Arena (4,214); Kalamazoo, MI
MAC tournament
March 11, 2009; 4:00pm	(8)	vs. (9) Ohio; First round	L 55–62	10–21	Quicken Loans Arena (N/A); Cleveland, OH
*Non-conference game. ^{#}Rankings from AP Poll. (#) Tournament seedings in parentheses. All times are in Eastern Time.
