= 2008–09 Northern Illinois Huskies men's basketball team =

American college basketball season

2008–09 Northern Illinois Huskies men's basketball
- Conference: Mid-American Conference
- West
- Record: 10–20 (5–11 MAC)
- Head coach: Ricardo Patton
- Assistant coaches: Dennis Gates; Will Smith; Sundance Wicks
- Home arena: Convocation Center

2008–09 Mid-American Conference men's basketball standings
	Conf.				Overall
Team	W		L	PCT	W		L	PCT
East
Bowling Green	11	–	5	.688	19	–	14	.576
Buffalo	11	–	5	.688	21	–	12	.636
Miami	10	–	6	.625	17	–	13	.567
Akron †	10	–	6	.625	23	–	13	.639
Kent State	10	–	6	.625	19	–	15	.559
Ohio	7	–	9	.438	15	–	17	.469
West
Ball State	7	–	9	.438	14	–	17	.452
Central Michigan	7	–	9	.438	12	–	19	.387
Western Michigan	7	–	9	.438	10	–	21	.323
Eastern Michigan	6	–	10	.375	8	–	24	.250
Northern Illinois	5	–	11	.313	10	–	20	.333
Toledo	5	–	11	.313	7	–	25	.219
† Conference tournament winner Rankings from AP Poll

The 2008–09 Northern Illinois Huskies men's basketball team represented Northern Illinois University in the 2008–09 college basketball season. This season was head coach Ricardo Patton's second season at Northern Illinois University.

== Roster ==
No.	Name	Pos.	Height	Weight	Year	Hometown	Previous school
32	Darion Anderson	G	6'02"	201	SO	Chicago, IL	Carver Military Academy
11	Mike DiNunno	G	5'11"	177	FR	Chicago, IL	Von Steuben
15	Ante Dzepina	C	6'08"	235	JR	Kraljevica, Croatia	Highland CC
2	Najul Irvin	F	6'05"	214	JR	Memphis, TN	Kankakee CC
55	Michael Fakade	C	6'07"	222	FR	Chicago, IL	Von Steuben
30	Lee Fisher	F	6'05"	206	FR	Dolton, IL	Thornridge
1	Bryan Hall	G	6'01"	157	FR	Chicago, IL	Whitney Young
41	Sean Kowal	C	6'11"	240	SO	St. Louis, MO	Desmet Jesuit; Colorado
24	Jeremy Landers	G	6'02"	185	SO	Milwaukee, WI	Murphysboro (IL); Gensis One (MS)
4	Michael Patton	G	5'10"	177	SO	Boulder, CO	Boulder; Solebury School (PA)
22	Justin Peaster	G	5'11"	165	FR	Aurora, IL	Waubonsie Valley
13	Xavier Silas	G	6'05"	201	JR	Austin, TX	Brewster Academy (NH); Colorado
10	Keith Smith	G	5'05"	135	FR	Chicago, IL	St. Ignatius
12	Sean Smith	F	6'07"	190	SR	Gary, IN	West Side; Vincennes JC
44	Tyler Storm	F	6'07"	206	FR	Geneseo, IL	Geneseo

== Schedule and results ==
Date time, TV	Rank^{#}	Opponent^{#}	Result	Record	Site city, state
November 14, 2008*; 5:00 pm ET		vs. Maine; 100 Club Classic	L 64–77	0–1	KSU Convocation Center; Kennesaw, GA
November 15, 2008*; 5:00 pm ET		vs. Western Illinois; 100 Club Classic	W 65–54	1–1	KSU Convocation Center; Kennesaw, GA
November 18, 2008*; 8:00 pm ET		Indiana State	W 86–79	2–1	Convocation Center; DeKalb, IL
November 21, 2008*; 8:30 pm ET		at Tennessee State	L 73–75	2–2	Gentry Center; Nashville, TN
November 27, 2008*; 1:45 am ET		vs. Portland State; Great Alaska Shootout	L 58–79	2–3	Sullivan Arena; Anchorage, AK
November 28, 2008*; 4:00 pm ET		at Alaska Anchorage; Great Alaska Shootout	W 71–68	3–3	Sullivan Arena; Anchorage, AK
November 29, 2008*; 6:00 pm ET		vs. Western Carolina; Great Alaska Shootout	L 67–71	3–4	Sullivan Arena; Anchorage, AK
December 3, 2008*; 9:00 pm ET		at Air Force	L 55–77	3–5	Clune Arena; Colorado Springs, CO
December 6, 2008*; 3:00 pm ET		Chicago State	W 93–81	4–5	Convocation Center; DeKalb, IL
December 14, 2008*; 3:00 pm ET		at Arkansas–Little Rock	L 85–97	4–6	Jack Stephens Center; Little Rock, AR
December 17, 2008*; 8:05 pm ET		Southern Illinois	L 58–73	4–7	Convocation Center; DeKalb, IL
December 20, 2008*; 6:00 pm ET		Loyola	L 62–72	4–8	Convocation Center; DeKalb, IL
January 10, 2009; 3:00 pm ET		Toledo	W 75–51	5–8 (1–0)	Convocation Center; DeKalb, IL
January 13, 2009; 7:00 pm ET		at Ball State	L 54–60	5–9 (1–1)	John E. Worthen Arena; Muncie, IN
January 17, 2009; 2:00 pm ET		at Western Michigan	L 52–71	5–10 (1–2)	University Arena; Kalamazoo, MI
January 20, 2009; 8:00 pm ET		Western Michigan	W 72–52	6–10 (2–2)	Convocation Center; DeKalb, IL
January 24, 2009; 3:00 pm ET		Central Michigan	L 45–58	6–11 (2–3)	Convocation Center; DeKalb, IL
*Non-conference game. ^{#}Rankings from AP Poll. (#) Tournament seedings in parentheses.
