= 2009 MAC men's basketball tournament =

- Logo for the 2009 Mid-American Conference tournament
- Classification: Division I
- Season: 2008–09
- Teams: 12
- Site: Quicken Loans Arena; Cleveland, Ohio
- Champions: Akron Zips (1st title)
- Winning coach: Keith Dambrot (1st title)
- MVP: Nate Linhart (Akron)
- Television: ESPN2, Fox Sports Net
- MAC men's basketball tournaments

The 2009 Mid-American Conference men's basketball tournament was the post-season men's basketball tournament for the Mid-American Conference (MAC) 2008–2009 season. The winner of the tournament receives the MAC's automatic bid into the NCAA Men's Division I Basketball Championship tournament. Fifth-seeded Akron defeated Buffalo in the final. In the NCAA tournament they lost in the first round to Gonzaga.

== Format ==
Each of the 12 men's basketball teams in the MAC receives a berth in the conference tournament. Teams are seeded by conference record with the following tie-breakers:

- Head-to-head competition
- Winning percentage vs. ranked conference teams (top to bottom, regardless of division, vs. common opponents regardless of the number of times played)
- Coin flip

The top four seeds receive byes into the quarterfinals. The winners of each division are awarded the #1 and #2 seeds. The team with the best record of the two receives the #1 seed.

== Bracket ==
2008–09 Mid-American Conference men's basketball standings
	Conf.				Overall
Team	W		L	PCT	W		L	PCT
East
Bowling Green	11	–	5	.688	19	–	14	.576
Buffalo	11	–	5	.688	21	–	12	.636
Miami	10	–	6	.625	17	–	13	.567
Akron †	10	–	6	.625	23	–	13	.639
Kent State	10	–	6	.625	19	–	15	.559
Ohio	7	–	9	.438	15	–	17	.469
West
Ball State	7	–	9	.438	14	–	17	.452
Central Michigan	7	–	9	.438	12	–	19	.387
Western Michigan	7	–	9	.438	10	–	21	.323
Eastern Michigan	6	–	10	.375	8	–	24	.250
Northern Illinois	5	–	11	.313	10	–	20	.333
Toledo	5	–	11	.313	7	–	25	.219
† Conference tournament winner Rankings from AP Poll

First round Tuesday, March 10
8	Western Michigan	55
9	Ohio	62
5	Akron	93*
12	Toledo	92
7	Central Michigan	62
10	Eastern Michigan	49
6	Kent State	64
11	Northern Illinois	61

Quarterfinals; Thursday, March 12
1	Bowling Green	74
9	Ohio	61
4	Miami (OH)	63
5	Akron	73
2	Ball State	64*
7	Central Michigan	61
3	Buffalo	65
6	Kent State	62

Semifinals; Friday, March 13
1	Bowling Green	55
5	Akron	63
2	Ball State	52
3	Buffalo	64

Final; Saturday, March 14
5	Akron	65
3	Buffalo	53

* Overtime

=== Tiebreakers ===
==== Seeds ====
Seed	Team	Record	Tiebreaker #1	Tiebreaker #2	Tiebreaker #3	Tiebreaker #4	Tiebreaker #5
1	Bowling Green	11–5	2–0 head-to-head	–	–	–	–
2	Ball State	7–9	Division champ	–	–	–	–
3	Buffalo	11–5	0–2 head-to-head	–	–	–	–
4	Miami	10–6	3–1 head-to-head	–	–	–	–
5	Akron	10–6	2–2 head-to-head	–	–	–	–
6	Kent State	10–6	1–3 head-to-head	–	–	–	–
7	Central Michigan	7–9	2–1 head-to-head	1–1 head-to-head	0–1 vs. #1 BGSU	0–1 vs. #2 Buffalo	1–0 vs. #3 Miami
8	Western Michigan	7–9	2–1 head-to-head	1–1 head-to-head	0–1 vs. #1 BGSU	0–1 vs. #2 Buffalo	0–1 vs. #3 Miami
9	Ohio	7–9	0–2 head-to-head	–	–	–	–
10	Eastern Michigan	6–10	1–1 head-to-head	1–0 vs. #1 BGSU	–	–	–
11	Northern Illinois	6–10	1–1 head-to-head	0–1 vs. #1 BGSU	–	–	–
12	Toledo	1–15	–	–	–	–	–

==== West Division ====
Team	Record	Tiebreaker #1	Tiebreaker #2	Tiebreaker #3
Ball State	7–9	2–2 head-to-head	0–1 vs. #1 BGSU	1–0 vs. #2 Buffalo
Central Michigan	7–9	2–2 head-to-head	0–1 vs. #1 BGSU	0–1 vs. #2 Buffalo
Western Michigan	7–9	2–2 head-to-head	0–1 vs. #1 BGSU	0–1 vs. #2 Buffalo

== All-Tournament Team ==
Tournament MVP – Nate Linhart, Akron

Player	Team
Nate Linhart	Akron
Brett McKnight	Akron
Steve McNees	Akron
Max Boudreau	Buffalo
Nate Miller	Bowling Green
