= 2008–09 Akron Zips men's basketball team =

American college basketball season

2008–09 Akron Zips men's basketball
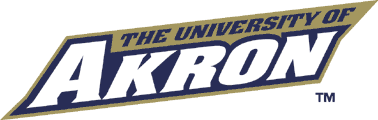

MAC Tournament champion

NCAA tournament, First Round
- Conference: Mid-American Conference
- East Division
- Record: 23–13 (10–6 MAC)
- Head coach: Keith Dambrot (5th season)
- Associate head coach: Jeff Boals (3rd season)
- Assistant coaches: Lamont Paris (3rd season); Terry Weigand (5th season)
- Home arena: Rhodes Arena

2008–09 Mid-American Conference men's basketball standings
	Conf.				Overall
Team	W		L	PCT	W		L	PCT
East
Bowling Green	11	–	5	.688	19	–	14	.576
Buffalo	11	–	5	.688	21	–	12	.636
Miami	10	–	6	.625	17	–	13	.567
Akron †	10	–	6	.625	23	–	13	.639
Kent State	10	–	6	.625	19	–	15	.559
Ohio	7	–	9	.438	15	–	17	.469
West
Ball State	7	–	9	.438	14	–	17	.452
Central Michigan	7	–	9	.438	12	–	19	.387
Western Michigan	7	–	9	.438	10	–	21	.323
Eastern Michigan	6	–	10	.375	8	–	24	.250
Northern Illinois	5	–	11	.313	10	–	20	.333
Toledo	5	–	11	.313	7	–	25	.219
† Conference tournament winner Rankings from AP Poll

The 2008–09 Akron Zips men's basketball team represented the University of Akron in the 2008–09 NCAA Division I men's basketball season. The Zips, led by head coach Keith Dambrot, played their home games at Rhodes Arena in Akron, Ohio, as members of the Mid-American Conference. The Zips won the 2009 MAC tournament to earn an automatic bid to the NCAA tournament as the 13th seed in the South region. Akron lost its first-round game in the tournament to Gonzaga, 77–64.

== Roster ==
2008–09 Akron Zips men's basketball team
Players
Coaches

Pos.	#	Name	Height	Weight	Year	Hometown
G	1	Ronnie Steward	5 ft 10 in (1.78 m)	175 lb (79 kg)	RS Fr	Columbus, Ohio
G	2	Kyle Petersen	6 ft 4 in (1.93 m)	180 lb (82 kg)	Fr	Naples, Florida
G	3	Alex Sullivan	5 ft 10 in (1.78 m)	175 lb (79 kg)	Fr	Painesville, Ohio
G	4	Steve McNees	6 ft 2 in (1.88 m)	170 lb (77 kg)	So	New Castle, Pennsylvania
G	5	Brett McClanahan	6 ft 4 in (1.93 m)	185 lb (84 kg)	Fr	Nitro, West Virginia
G	12	Darryl Roberts	5 ft 11 in (1.8 m)	165 lb (75 kg)	Jr	Toledo, Ohio
F	13	Nikola Cvetinović	6 ft 8 in (2.03 m)	230 lb (104 kg)	Fr	Loznica, Serbia
G	14	Eric Coblentz	6 ft 2 in (1.88 m)	185 lb (84 kg)	RS Fr	Uniontown, Ohio
F	15	Tim Carroll	6 ft 3 in (1.91 m)	215 lb (98 kg)	Jr	Akron, Ohio
F	23	Brett McKnight	6 ft 6 in (1.98 m)	245 lb (111 kg)	So	Lancaster, Ohio
G	24	Anthony Hitchens	5 ft 9 in (1.75 m)	168 lb (76 kg)	Fr	Chillicothe, Ohio
F	30	Chris McKnight	6 ft 7 in (2.01 m)	225 lb (102 kg)	Jr	Lancaster, Ohio
F	32	Jimmy Conyers	6 ft 5 in (1.96 m)	220 lb (100 kg)	Sr	Baltimore, Maryland
F	33	Nate Linhart	6 ft 8 in (2.03 m)	205 lb (93 kg)	Sr	Gahanna, Ohio
C	40	Steve Swiech	6 ft 9 in (2.06 m)	250 lb (113 kg)	RS Fr	Pittsburgh, Pennsylvania
F	42	Andrew Parrish	6 ft 8 in (2.03 m)	225 lb (102 kg)	Fr	Dayton, Ohio
C	54	Mike Bardo	6 ft 10 in (2.08 m)	240 lb (109 kg)	So	Cincinnati, Ohio

Head coach

- Keith Dambrot (Akron)

Assistant coach(es)

- Jeff Boals (Ohio)
- Lamont Paris (Wooster)
- Terry Weigand (Ashland)

Legend

- (C) Team captain
- (S) Suspended
- (I) Ineligible
- (W) Walk-on
- Injured
- Current redshirt

Roster
Last update: October 17, 2022

== Schedule and results ==
Date time, TV	Rank^{#}	Opponent^{#}	Result	Record	Site city, state
Exhibition
November 6, 2008*; 7:00 pm		Walsh	W 83–81		Rhodes Arena; Akron, OH
Regular season
November 15, 2008*; 7:00 pm		Canisius	W 56–46	1–0	Rhodes Arena; Akron, OH
November 18, 2008*; 7:00 pm		Winthrop	W 72–58	2–0	Rhodes Arena; Akron, OH
November 21, 2008*; 7:00 pm		at No. 6 Pittsburgh; Legends Classic	L 67–86	2–1	Petersen Events Center; Pittsburgh, PA
November 25, 2008*; 7:00 pm		Urbana; Legends Classic	W 77–68	3–1	Rhodes Arena; Akron, OH
November 29, 2008*; 7:00 pm		vs. Eastern Kentucky; Legends Classic	L 57–69	3–2	Rothman Center; Hackensack, NJ
November 30, 2008*; 7:00 pm		at Fairleigh Dickinson; Legends Classic	W 85–41	4–2	Rothman Center; Hackensack, NJ
December 3, 2008*; 7:00 pm		at Niagara	W 63–59	5–2	Gallagher Center; Lewiston, NY
December 6, 2008*; 7:00 pm		Dayton	L 50–54	5–3	Rhodes Arena; Akron, OH
December 13, 2008*; 7:00 pm		North Carolina A&T	W 78–61	6–3	Rhodes Arena; Akron, OH
December 17, 2008*; 7:30 pm		at VCU	L 69–73	6–4	Siegel Center; Richmond, VA
December 28, 2008*; 7:00 pm		St. Francis Brooklyn	W 77–70	7–4	Rhodes Arena; Akron, OH
December 31, 2008*; 2:00 pm		at UNC Greensboro	W 75–53	8–4	Fleming Gymnasium; Greensboro, NC
January 3, 2009*; 2:00 pm		at Rhode Island	L 50–79	8–5	Ryan Center; Kingston, RI
January 10, 2009; 4:00 pm		at Miami (OH)	L 51–64	8–6 (0–1)	Millett Hall; Oxford, OH
January 13, 2009; 7:00 pm		Buffalo	L 61–63	8–7 (0–2)	Rhodes Arena; Akron, OH
January 17, 2009; 4:30 pm		at Bowling Green	W 62–52	9–7 (1–2)	Anderson Arena; Bowling Green, OH
January 20, 2009; 7:00 pm		at Ohio	L 65–70	9–8 (1–3)	Convocation Center; Athens, OH
January 24, 2009; 7:00 pm		Kent State	W 68–54	10–8 (2–3)	Rhodes Arena; Akron, OH
January 26, 2009*; 7:00 pm		at Youngstown State	W 67–53	11–8	Beeghly Center; Youngstown, OH
January 28, 2009; 7:00 pm		at Toledo	W 70–61	12–8 (3–3)	Savage Arena; Toledo, OH
January 31, 2009; 7:00 pm		Central Michigan	W 64–43	13–8 (4–3)	Rhodes Arena; Akron, OH
February 3, 2009; 7:00 pm		at Eastern Michigan	W 78–41	14–8 (5–3)	Convocation Center; Ypsilanti, MI
February 8, 2009; 2:00 pm		Western Michigan	W 87–63	15–8 (6–3)	Rhodes Arena; Akron, OH
February 11, 2009; 7:00 pm		Ball State	W 63–55	16–8 (7–3)	Rhodes Arena; Akron, OH
February 15, 2009; 8:00 pm		at Northern Illinois	L 79–83	16–9 (7–4)	Convocation Center; DeKalb, IL
February 18, 2009; 7:00 pm		Miami (OH)	W 53–44	17–9 (8–4)	Rhodes Arena; Akron, OH
February 21, 2009*		at Valparaiso; ESPN BracketBusters	L 66–74	17–10	Athletics–Recreation Center; Valparaiso, IN
February 26, 2009; 7:00 pm		at Buffalo	W 62–57	18–10 (9–4)	Alumni Arena; Buffalo, NY
March 1, 2009; 2:00 pm		Bowling Green	L 46–50	18–11 (9–5)	Rhodes Arena; Akron, OH
March 5, 2009; 7:00 pm		Ohio	W 65–58	19–11 (10–5)	Rhodes Arena; Akron, OH
March 8, 2009; 2:00 pm		at Kent State	L 63–67	19–12 (10–6)	MAC Center; Kent, OH
MAC tournament
March 10, 2009	(5)	vs. (12) Toledo; MAC First Round	W 93–92 ^{OT}	20–12	Quicken Loans Arena; Cleveland, OH
March 12, 2009; 9:30 pm	(5)	vs. (4) Miami (OH); MAC Quarterfinals	W 73–63	21–12	Quicken Loans Arena; Cleveland, OH
March 13, 2009; 9:30 pm	(5)	vs. (1) Bowling Green; MAC Semifinals	W 63–55	22–12	Quicken Loans Arena; Cleveland, OH
March 14, 2009; 1:00 pm	(5)	vs. (3) Buffalo; MAC Championship	W 65–53	23–12	Quicken Loans Arena; Cleveland, OH
NCAA tournament
March 19, 2009; 4:25 pm	(13 S)	vs. (4 S) Gonzaga; NCAA First Round	L 64–77	23–13	Rose Garden; Portland, OR
*Non-conference game. ^{#}Rankings from AP Poll. (#) Tournament seedings in parentheses.
