= 2008–09 Ball State Cardinals men's basketball team =

American college basketball season

2008–09 Ball State Cardinals men's basketball
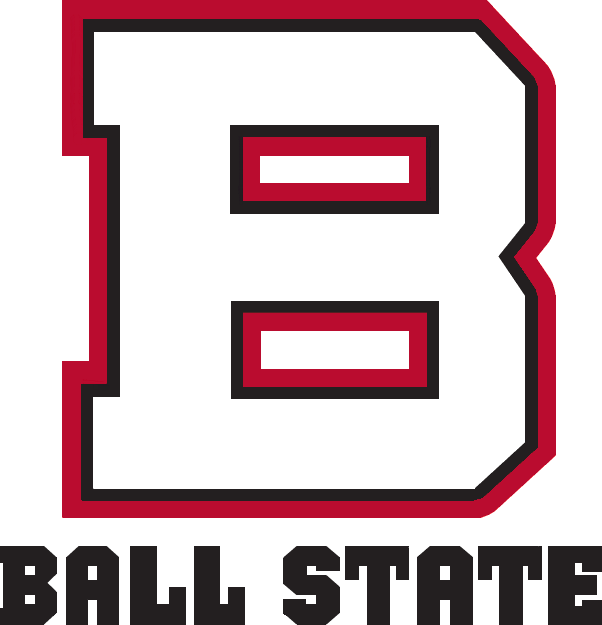

MAC West Division Co-Champion
- Conference: Mid-American Conference
- West
- Record: 14–17 (7–9 MAC)
- Head coach: Billy Taylor
- Assistant coaches: Bob Simmons; Jay Newberry; Joseph Price
- Home arena: John E. Worthen Arena

2008–09 Mid-American Conference men's basketball standings
	Conf.				Overall
Team	W		L	PCT	W		L	PCT
East
Bowling Green	11	–	5	.688	19	–	14	.576
Buffalo	11	–	5	.688	21	–	12	.636
Miami	10	–	6	.625	17	–	13	.567
Akron †	10	–	6	.625	23	–	13	.639
Kent State	10	–	6	.625	19	–	15	.559
Ohio	7	–	9	.438	15	–	17	.469
West
Ball State	7	–	9	.438	14	–	17	.452
Central Michigan	7	–	9	.438	12	–	19	.387
Western Michigan	7	–	9	.438	10	–	21	.323
Eastern Michigan	6	–	10	.375	8	–	24	.250
Northern Illinois	5	–	11	.313	10	–	20	.333
Toledo	5	–	11	.313	7	–	25	.219
† Conference tournament winner Rankings from AP Poll

The 2008–09 Ball State Cardinals men's basketball team was an NCAA Division I college basketball team competing in the Mid-American Conference.

== Coaching staff ==
- Billy Taylor – Head coach
- Joseph Price – Assistant coach
- Bob Simmons – Assistant coach
- Jay Newberry – Assistant coach
- Matt Laur – Director of Basketball Operations

== Roster ==
Note: Flags indicate national team eligibility at FIBA sanctioned events. Players may hold other non-FIBA nationality not displayed.

No.		Position	Player
0	(United States)	G	Joey Clawson
1	(United States)	F	Malik Perry
2	(United States)	G	Othello Banaci
3	(United States)	G	Randy Davis
4	(United States)	G	Brandon Lampley
5	(United States)	G	Brawley Chisholm
10	(United States)	G	KeAundre Peak
11	(United States)	G	Laron Frazier

No.		Position	Player
22	(United States)	F	Terrence Watson
23	(United States)	F	Eric Wormely
24	(United States)	G	Rob Giles
30	(United States)	F	Maurice Hubbard
32	(United States)	F	Anthony Newell
34	(United States)	G	Pierre Sneed
45	(United States)	F	Jarrod Jones
50	(United States)	C	Zach Fields

Walk-on players are italicized.

== Schedule ==
Date time, TV	Rank^{#}	Opponent^{#}	Result	Record	Site (attendance) city, state
11/15/2008*; 2:00pm		Eastern Illinois	W 72–59	1–0	John E. Worthen Arena (3874); Muncie, IN
11/19/2008*; 7:00pm		at Butler	W 64–55	1–1	Hinkle Fieldhouse (5056); Indianapolis, IN
11/22/2008*; 2:00pm		SIU Edwardsville	W 67–55	2–1	John E. Worthen Arena (3500); Muncie, IN
11/25/2008*; 8:05pm		at Wisconsin-Milwaukee	W 82–69	3–1	US Cellular Arena (2525); Milwaukee, WI
11/29/2008*; 2:00pm		Arkansas State	W 54–53	3–2	John E. Worthen Arena (3004); Muncie, IN
12/1/2008*; 7:00pm		at IPFW	W 54–52	4–2	Allen County War Memorial Coliseum (2428); Fort Wayne, IN
12/6/2008*; 8:05pm		at Evansville	W 73–67	4–3	Roberts Municipal Stadium (5297); Evansville, IN
12/9/2008*; 7:00pm		No. 14 Purdue	W 68–39	4–4	John E. Worthen Arena (8381); Muncie, IN
12/13/2008*; 2:00pm, Ball State Sports Network		Eastern Kentucky	W 71–58	4–5	John E. Worthen Arena (3160); Muncie, IN
12/21/2008*; 1:00pm		Presbyterian	W 60–57	5–5	John E. Worthen Arena (2824); Muncie, IN
12/29/2008*; 10:00pm		at UC-Santa Barbara	W 71–51	5–6	University of California, Santa Barbara Events Center (1519); Santa Barbara, CA
1/3/2009*; 2:00pm		Saint Joseph's	W 63–55	5–7	John E. Worthen Arena (3,033); Muncie, IN
1/10/2009; 4:00pm, Ball State Sports Network		at Eastern Michigan	W 46–42	6–7 (1–0)	Convocation Center (843); Ypsilanti, MI
1/13/2009; 7:00pm		Northern Illinois	W 60–54	7–7 (2–0)	John E. Worthen Arena (3,001); Muncie, IN
1/17/2009; 4:30pm, Ball State Sports Network		at Central Michigan	W 71–65	7–8 (2–1)	Rose Arena (1,575); Mount Pleasant, MI
1/20/2008; 7:00pm		Western Michigan	W 50–44	8–8 (3–1)	John E. Worthen Arena (3,018); Muncie, IN
1/25/2009; 2:00pm, Ball State Sports Network		Toledo	W 66–53	9–8 (4–1)	John E. Worthen Arena (3,504); Muncie, IN
1/28/2009; 7:00pm		at Bowling Green	W 62–58	9–9 (4–2)	Anderson Arena (1,847); Bowling Green, OH
1/31/2009; 2:00pm, Ball State Sports Network		Ohio	W 51–44	10–9 (5–2)	John E. Worthen Arena (3524); Muncie, IN
2/4/2009; 7:00pm, Ball State Sports Network		at Miami	W 59–41	10–10 (5–3)	Millett Hall (2481); Oxford, OH
2/7/2009; 2:00pm		Kent State	W 63–56	10–11 (5–4)	John E. Worthen Arena (3506); Muncie, IN
2/11/2009; 7:00pm		at Akron	W 63–55	10–12 (5–5)	James A. Rhodes Arena (3272); Akron, OH
2/15/2009; 2:00pm, Ball State Sports Network		Buffalo	W 53–51	11–12 (6–5)	John E. Worthen Arena (3565); Muncie, IN
2/18/2009; 7:00pm		at Toledo	W 71–67	11–13 (6–6)	Savage Hall (5008); Toledo, OH
2/21/2009*; 2:00pm		Tennessee Tech; Bracket Busters	W 59–55	12–13 (6–6)	John E. Worthen Arena (3429); Muncie, IN
2/25/2009; 7:00pm		Central Michigan	W 53–44	13–13 (7–6)	John E. Worthen Arena (3438); Muncie, IN
2/28/2009; TBA, Ball State Sports Network		at Northern Illinois	W 56–55	13–14 (7–7)	Convocation Center (2283); DeKalb, IL
3/4/2009; 7:00pm, Ball State Sports Network		at Western Michigan	W 84–82	13–15 (7–8)	University Arena (2616); Kalamazoo, MI
3/8/2009; 2:00pm, Ball State Sports Network		Eastern Michigan	W 55–53	13–16 (7–9)	John E. Worthen Arena (3687); Muncie, IN
3/12/2009; 12:00pm, FSN Ohio		vs. Central Michigan; MAC Conference tournament	W 64–61	14–16	Quicken Loans Arena (N/A); Cleveland, OH
3/13/2009; 7:30pm, FSN Ohio		vs. Buffalo; MAC Conference tournament	W 64–52	14–17	Quicken Loans Arena (N/A); Cleveland, OH
*Non-conference game. ^{#}Rankings from AP Poll. (#) Tournament seedings in parentheses. All times are in Eastern Time.
