= 2008–09 Buffalo Bulls men's basketball team =

American college basketball season

2008–09 Buffalo Bulls men's basketball

CBI, First Round
- Conference: Mid-American Conference
- East
- Record: 21-12 (11-5 MAC)
- Head coach: Reggie Witherspoon
- Assistant coaches: Jim Kwitchoff; Kevin Heck; Turner Battle
- Home arena: Alumni Arena

2008–09 Mid-American Conference men's basketball standings
	Conf.				Overall
Team	W		L	PCT	W		L	PCT
East
Bowling Green	11	–	5	.688	19	–	14	.576
Buffalo	11	–	5	.688	21	–	12	.636
Miami	10	–	6	.625	17	–	13	.567
Akron †	10	–	6	.625	23	–	13	.639
Kent State	10	–	6	.625	19	–	15	.559
Ohio	7	–	9	.438	15	–	17	.469
West
Ball State	7	–	9	.438	14	–	17	.452
Central Michigan	7	–	9	.438	12	–	19	.387
Western Michigan	7	–	9	.438	10	–	21	.323
Eastern Michigan	6	–	10	.375	8	–	24	.250
Northern Illinois	5	–	11	.313	10	–	20	.333
Toledo	5	–	11	.313	7	–	25	.219
† Conference tournament winner Rankings from AP Poll

The 2008–09 Buffalo Bulls men's basketball team represented the University at Buffalo in the 2008-09 college basketball season. This was head coach Reggie Witherspoon's tenth season at Buffalo. The Bulls advanced to the finals of the MAC tournament, where they lost to Akron.

== Roster ==
No.	Name	Pos.	Height	Weight	Year	Hometown	Previous school
1	Andy Robinson	G	6' 1"	190	SR	Schenectady, NY	Schenectady High School
2	Byron Mulkey	G	6' 0"	170	JR	Wheatfield, NY	Niagara-Wheatfield High School
3	Sean Smiley	G	6' 1"	165	JR	Erie, PA	McDowell High School
4	Rodney Pierce	G	6' 2"	195	JR	Buffalo, NY	Hutchinson Central Technical High School
5	Zach Filzen	G	6' 3"	185	SO	Northfield, MN	Northfield High School; Northern Arizona University
15	Vadim Fedotov	F/C	6' 9"	260	SR	Munich, Germany	Schloss Hagerhoff
21	Mitchell Watt	F	6' 9"	210	FR	Goodyear, AZ	Desert Edge High School
22	John Boyer	G	6' 1"	185	JR	Hollidaysburg, PA	Hollidaysburg Area High School
25	Calvin Betts	G/F	6' 3"	225	JR	Rochester, NY	Rush-Henrietta Senior High School
30	Titus Robinson	F	6' 7"	190	FR	Charlotte, NC	East Mecklenburg High School
32	Jawaan Alston	F	6' 8"	220	SO	Uniontown, PA	Albert Gallatin Area High School
33	Adekambi Laleye	F	6' 9"	210	JR	Ottawa, Ontario	Champlain St. Lambert
34	Greg Gamble	G/F	6' 4"	200	SR	Niagara Falls, NY	Niagara Falls High School
35	Brian Addison	F	6' 8"	225	SR	Queens, NY	Andrew Jackson High School
40	Max Boudreau	F	6' 7"	230	JR	Montreal, Quebec	Champlain St. Lambert
42	Dave Barnett	G/F	6' 5"	200	FR	East Aurora, NY	East Aurora High School

== Schedule and results ==
Date time, TV	Rank^{#}	Opponent^{#}	Result	Record	Site city, state
Regular season
November 15, 2008*; 7:05 pm		at Youngstown State	W 70-62	1–0	Beeghly Center; Youngstown, OH
November 18, 2008*; 7:35 pm		at Canisius	W 69-64	2–0	Koessler Athletic Center; Buffalo, NY
November 22, 2008*; 8:05 pm		at Evansville	L 49–64	2–1	Roberts Municipal Stadium; Evansville, IN
November 25, 2008*; 8:00 pm, Time Warner Cable SportsNet		Niagara	L 61–65	2–2	Alumni Arena; Amherst, NY
November 29, 2008*; 4:00 pm		Temple	W 83–73	3–2	Alumni Arena; Amherst, NY
December 4, 2008*; 7:00 pm, Big East Network		No. 2 Connecticut	L 64–68	3–3	Alumni Arena; Amherst, NY
December 6, 2008*; 4:00 pm		FIU	W 70–56	4–3	Alumni Arena; Amherst, NY
December 20, 2008*; 4:00 pm ET		UNC Asheville	W 71–52	5–3	Alumni Arena; Amherst, NY
December 23, 2008*; 7:00 pm		at Siena	L 60–71	5–4	Times Union Center; Albany, NY
December 28, 2008*; 10:00 pm, KFVE		vs. Pepperdine; 2008 Outrigger Hotels Rainbow Classic	W 72–71 ^{OT}	6–4	Stan Sheriff Center; Honolulu, HI
December 29, 2008*; 10:00 pm, KFVE		vs. Colorado; 2008 Outrigger Hotels Rainbow Classic	W 62–60	7–4	Stan Sheriff Center; Honolulu, HI
December 30, 2008*; 12:30 am, KFVE		vs. Colorado State; 2008 Outrigger Hotels Rainbow Classic	W 67–53	8–4	Stan Sheriff Center; Honolulu, HI
January 10, 2009; 2:00 pm		at Bowling Green	L 82–86	8–5 (0–1)	Anderson Arena; Bowling Green, OH
January 13, 2009; 7:05 pm		at Akron	W 63–61	9–5 (1–1)	James A. Rhodes Arena; Akron, OH
January 17, 2009; 4:30 pm		Ohio	W 70–66	10–5 (2–1)	Alumni Arena; Amherst, NY
January 21, 2009; 7:00 pm, Time Warner Cable SportsNet		Kent State	W 64–53	11–5 (3–1)	Alumni Arena; Amherst, NY
January 24, 2009; 4:35 pm		at Miami (OH)	W 76–64	12–5 (4–1)	Millett Hall; Oxford, OH
January 27, 2009; 7:00 pm ET		at Western Michigan	W 74–71	13–5 (5–1)	University Arena; Kalamazoo, MI
January 31, 2009; 12:00 pm, ESPN2		Toledo	W 56–43	14–5 (6–1)	Alumni Arena; Amherst, NY
February 3, 2009; 7:00 pm, Time Warner Cable SportsNet		Central Michigan	W 56–55	15–5 (7–1)	Alumni Arena; Amherst, NY
February 7, 2009; 2:00 pm		Northern Illinois; Homecoming	W 68–46	16–5 (8–1)	Alumni Arena; Amherst, NY
February 12, 2009; 7:00 pm		at Eastern Michigan	W 58–49	17–5 (9–1)	Convocation Center; Ypsilanti, MI
February 15, 2009; 2:00 pm		at Ball State	L 51–53	17–6 (9–2)	John E. Worthen Arena; Muncie, IN
February 18, 2009; 7:00 pm, Time Warner Cable SportsNet		Bowling Green	L 48–59	17–7 (9–3)	Alumni Arena; Amherst, NY
February 21, 2009*; 1:00 pm, ESPN2		at Vermont; ESPN BracketBusters	L 70–78	17–8	Patrick Gym; Burlington, VT
February 26, 2009; 7:00 pm		Akron	L 57–62	17–9 (9–4)	Alumni Arena; Amherst, NY
March 1, 2009; 12:00 pm, ESPNU		at Ohio	W 68–66	18–9 (10–4)	Convocation Center; Athens, OH
March 5, 2009; 7:00 pm		at Kent State	L 71–77 ^{OT}	18–10 (10–5)	Memorial Athletic and Convocation Center; Kent, OH
March 8, 2009; 2:00 pm		Miami (OH)	W 70–67 ^{OT}	19–10 (11–5)	Alumni Arena; Amherst, NY
MAC tournament
March 12, 2009; 2:30 pm, Fox Sports Ohio	(3)	vs. (6) Kent State; Quarterfinals	W 65–62	20–10	Quicken Loans Arena; Cleveland, OH
March 13, 2009; 7:30 pm, Fox Sports Ohio	(3)	vs. (2) Ball State; Semifinals	W 64–52	21–10	Quicken Loans Arena; Cleveland, OH
March 14, 2009; 8:00 pm, ESPN2	(3)	vs. (5) Akron; Finals	L 53–65	21–11	Quicken Loans Arena; Cleveland, OH
College Basketball Invitational
March 18, 2009*; 8:00 pm, HDNet		at Wichita State; First Round	L 73–84	21–12	Charles Koch Arena; Wichita, KS
*Non-conference game. ^{#}Rankings from AP Poll. (#) Tournament seedings in parentheses. All times are in Eastern Time.
