= 2008–09 Kent State Golden Flashes men's basketball team =

American college basketball season

2008–09 Kent State Golden Flashes men's basketball

CIT, First Round
- Conference: Mid-American Conference
- East Division
- Record: 19–15 (10–6 MAC)
- Head coach: Geno Ford (1st season)
- Associate head coach: Rob Senderoff (1st season)
- Home arena: Memorial Athletic and Convocation Center

2008–09 Mid-American Conference men's basketball standings
	Conf.				Overall
Team	W		L	PCT	W		L	PCT
East
Bowling Green	11	–	5	.688	19	–	14	.576
Buffalo	11	–	5	.688	21	–	12	.636
Miami	10	–	6	.625	17	–	13	.567
Akron †	10	–	6	.625	23	–	13	.639
Kent State	10	–	6	.625	19	–	15	.559
Ohio	7	–	9	.438	15	–	17	.469
West
Ball State	7	–	9	.438	14	–	17	.452
Central Michigan	7	–	9	.438	12	–	19	.387
Western Michigan	7	–	9	.438	10	–	21	.323
Eastern Michigan	6	–	10	.375	8	–	24	.250
Northern Illinois	5	–	11	.313	10	–	20	.333
Toledo	5	–	11	.313	7	–	25	.219
† Conference tournament winner Rankings from AP Poll

The 2008–09 Kent State Golden Flashes men's basketball team represented Kent State University in the 2008–09 college basketball season. The team was coached by Geno Ford and played their home games in the Memorial Athletic and Convocation Center. They are members of the Mid-American Conference. They finished the season 19–15, 10–6 in MAC play.

== Roster ==
2008–09 Kent State Golden Flashes men's basketball team
Players
Coaches

Pos.	#	Name	Height	Weight	Year	Hometown
F	14	Antonio DiMaria	6 ft 7 in (2.01 m)	—	Fr
G	0	Tyree Evans	6 ft 3 in (1.91 m)	—	Jr
G	5	Albert Fisher	6 ft 1 in (1.85 m)	—	Sr	Pennsauken, NJ
F	33	Justin Greene	6 ft 8 in (2.03 m)	—	Fr
F	42	Alex Grimsley	6 ft 6 in (1.98 m)	—	Fr
F	30	Frank Henery-Ala	6 ft 5 in (1.96 m)	—	Jr
G	13	Cameron Joyce	5 ft 8 in (1.73 m)	—	Fr
G	22	Mike McKee	6 ft 5 in (1.96 m)	—	Jr
G	11	Jordan Mincy	5 ft 10 in (1.78 m)	—	Sr	Memphis, TN
C	55	Brandon Parks	6 ft 10 in (2.08 m)	—	Jr
G	32	Rodriguez Sherman	6 ft 2 in (1.88 m)	—	Jr
G	2	Chris Singletary	6 ft 3 in (1.91 m)	—	Jr
F	34	Julian Sullinger	6 ft 5 in (1.96 m)	—	Sr
F	3	Rashad Woods	6 ft 5 in (1.96 m)	—	Sr

Head coach

- Geno Ford (Ohio)

Assistant coach(es)

- Rob Senderoff (Albany)

Legend

- (C) Team captain
- (S) Suspended
- (I) Ineligible
- (W) Walk-on
- Injured
- Current redshirt

Roster
Last update: June 23, 2014

== Schedule and results ==
Date time, TV	Opponent	Result	Record	Site (attendance) city, state
Regular season
11/17/2008*; 7:00 pm	North Carolina Central	W 83–42	1–0	MAC Center (3,074); Kent, OH
11/19/2008*; 8:00 pm	at Saint Louis	W 76–74 ^{OT}	2–0	Chaifetz Arena (6,434); St. Louis, MO
11/23/2008*; 4:30 pm	UNC Wilmington	W 83–64	3–0	MAC Center (3,252); Kent, OH
11/28/2008*; 6:00 pm	vs. Illinois	L 63–69 ^{OT}	3–1	Convention Center (1,423); South Padre Island, TX
11/29/2008*; 5:30 pm	vs. Texas A&M	L 71–77	3–2	Convention Center (1,632); South Padre Island, TX
12/1/2008*; 9:00 pm	at Kansas	L 60–87	3–3	Allen Fieldhouse (16,300); Lawrence, KS
12/4/2008*; 7:00 pm	Saint Mary's	L 69–75	3–4	MAC Center (4,218); Kent, OH
12/6/2008*; 7:00 pm	Western Carolina	L 84–89 ^{OT}	3–5	MAC Center (3,011); Kent, OH
12/15/2008*; 7:00 pm	Youngstown State	W 82–74	4–5	MAC Center (2,518); Kent, OH
12/18/2008*; 7:00 pm	UNC Greensboro	W 73–62	5–5	MAC Center (3,252); Kent, OH
12/23/2008*; 7:00 pm	at Cleveland State	L 41–67	5–6	Wolstein Center (4,051); Cleveland, OH
12/30/2008*; 7:00 pm	Shawnee State	W 93–42	6–6	MAC Center (2,418); Kent, OH
1/3/2009*; 6:00 pm	at Hampton	W 68–43	7–6	Hampton Convocation Center (1,365); Hampton, VA
1/5/2009*; 7:00 pm	at Temple	L 58–73	7–7	Liacouras Center (3,508); Philadelphia, PA
1/11/2009; 2:00 pm	at Ohio	L 65–71	7–8 (0–1)	Convocation Center (7,118); Athens, OH
1/14/2009; 7:00 pm	Bowling Green	W 72–48	8–8 (1–1)	MAC Center (2,118); Kent, OH
1/17/2009; 12:00 pm	Miami (OH)	L 55–66	8–9 (1–2)	MAC Center (3,086); Kent, OH
1/21/2009; 7:00 pm	at Buffalo	L 53–64	8–10 (1–3)	Alumni Arena (2,032); Buffalo, NY
1/24/2009; 12:00 pm	at Akron	L 53–68	8–11 (1–4)	Rhodes Arena (4,151); Akron, OH
1/27/2009; 7:00 pm	Eastern Michigan	W 68–46	9–11 (2–4)	MAC Center (2,447); Kent, OH
1/31/2009; 2:00 pm	at Western Michigan	W 65–47	10–11 (3–4)	University Arena (3,234); Kalamazoo, MI
2/3/2009; 7:00 pm	Toledo	W 81–53	11–11 (4–4)	MAC Center (2,031); Kent, OH
2/7/2009; 2:00 pm	at Ball State	W 63–56	12–11 (5–4)	John E. Worthen Arena (3,506); Muncie, IN
2/10/2009; 8:00 pm	at Northern Illinois	W 86–83 ^{2OT}	13–11 (6–4)	Convocation Center (1,564); Dekalb, Illinois
2/14/2009; 7:00 pm	Central Michigan	W 61–57	14–11 (7–4)	MAC Center (4,172); Kent, OH
2/17/2009; 7:30 pm	Ohio	W 64–51	15–11 (8–4)	MAC Center (2,987); Kent, OH
2/21/2009*; 7:00 pm	Morehead State	W 79–76	16–11 (8–4)	MAC Center (4,413); Kent, OH
2/26/2009; 6:30 pm	at Bowling Green	L 66–67	18–12 (8–5)	Anderson Arena (2,045); Bowling Green, OH
3/1/2009; 2:00 pm	at Miami (OH)	L 63–68	16–13 (8–6)	Millett Hall (2,226); Oxford, OH
3/5/2009; 7:00 pm	Buffalo	W 77–71	17–13 (9–6)	MAC Center (3,194); Kent, OH
3/8/2009; 12:00 pm	Akron	W 67–63	18–13 (10–6)	MAC Center (5,327); Kent, OH
2009 MAC tournament
3/10/2009; 2:30 pm	vs. Northern Illinois; First Round	W 64–61	19–13 (10–6)	Quicken Loans Arena (5,637); Cleveland, OH
3/12/2009; 2:30 pm	vs. Buffalo; Second Round	L 62–65	19–14 (10–6)	Quicken Loans Arena (3,892); Cleveland, OH
2009 CIT
3/17/2009; 7:00 pm	vs. Oakland; First Round	L 74–80	19–15 (10–6)	Athletics Center O'rena (2,155); Rochester, MI
*Non-conference game. ^{#}Rankings from AP Poll. (#) Tournament seedings in parentheses. All times are in Eastern.
