= 2008–09 Illinois Fighting Illini men's basketball team =

American college basketball season

2008–09 Illinois Fighting Illini men's basketball

NCAA men's Division I tournament, Round of 64
- Conference: Big Ten Conference
- Record: 24–10 (11–7 Big Ten)
- Head coach: Bruce Weber (6th season)
- Assistant coaches: Wayne McClain (8th season); Jay Price (6th season); Jerrance Howard (2nd season)
- MVP: Chester Frazier
- Captains: Chester Frazier; Trent Meacham
- Home arena: Assembly Hall

2008–09 Big Ten Conference men's basketball standings
| | Conf. | | | | Overall |
| Team | W | | L | PCT | W | | L | PCT |
|---|---|---|---|---|---|---|---|---|
| No. 8 Michigan State | 15 | – | 3 | .833 | 31 | – | 7 | .816 |
| No. 17 Purdue† | 11 | – | 7 | .611 | 27 | – | 10 | .730 |
| Illinois | 11 | – | 7 | .611 | 24 | – | 10 | .706 |
| Penn State | 10 | – | 8 | .556 | 27 | – | 11 | .711 |
| Ohio State | 10 | – | 8 | .556 | 22 | – | 11 | .667 |
| Wisconsin | 10 | – | 8 | .556 | 20 | – | 13 | .606 |
| Minnesota | 9 | – | 9 | .500 | 22 | – | 11 | .667 |
| Michigan | 9 | – | 9 | .500 | 21 | – | 14 | .600 |
| Northwestern | 8 | – | 10 | .444 | 17 | – | 14 | .548 |
| Iowa | 5 | – | 13 | .278 | 15 | – | 17 | .469 |
| Indiana | 1 | – | 17 | .056 | 6 | – | 25 | .194 |
† 2009 Big Ten tournament winner Rankings from AP poll

The 2008–09 Illinois Fighting Illini men's basketball team represented University of Illinois at Urbana–Champaign in the 2008–09 NCAA Division I men's basketball season. This was head coach Bruce Weber's sixth season at Illinois.

== 2008 recruiting class ==
College recruiting information
| Name | Hometown | School | Height | Weight | Commit date |
|---|---|---|---|---|---|
| Stan Simpson; C | Chicago, IL | Simeon Career Academy | 6 ft 9 in (2.06 m) | 220 lb (100 kg) | Oct 15, 2007 |
| Stan Simpson; C | Recruit ratings: Scout: Rivals: (89) | | | | |
| Dominique Keller; PF | Port Arthur, TX | Lee College | 6 ft 7 in (2.01 m) | 220 lb (100 kg) | Mar 10, 2008 |
| Dominique Keller; PF | Recruit ratings: Scout: Rivals: (N/A) | | | | |
Overall recruit ranking: 247Sports: 189 On3: 266
Note: In many cases, Scout, Rivals, 247Sports, On3, and ESPN may conflict in their listings of height and weight.; In these cases, the average was taken. ESPN grades are on a 100-point scale.; Sources: "Illinois Commit List for 2008". Rivals.; "Men's Basketball Recruiting". Scout.; "ESPN – Illinois Fighting Illini Basketball Recruiting 2008". ESPN.; "Scout.com Team Recruiting Rankings". Scout.; "2008 Team Ranking". Rivals.; "2008–09 Illinois Fighting Illini men's basketball team". 247Sports.; "2008–09 Illinois Fighting Illini men's basketball team". On3.

== Roster ==
2008–09 Illinois Fighting Illini men's basketball team
Players
Coaches

| Pos. | # | Name | Height | Weight | Year | Previous school | Hometown |
|---|---|---|---|---|---|---|---|
| G | 1 | Trent Meacham (C) | 6 ft 2 in (1.88 m) | 195 lb (88 kg) | RS Sr | Centennial High School | Champaign, IL |
| G | 3 | Chester Frazier (C) | 6 ft 2 in (1.88 m) | 195 lb (88 kg) | Sr | Lake Clifton Eastern High School | Baltimore, MD |
| G | 13 | Jeffrey Jordan | 6 ft 1 in (1.85 m) | 185 lb (84 kg) | So | Loyola Academy | Highland Park, IL |
| G | 15 | Bubba Chisholm | 5 ft 11 in (1.8 m) | 180 lb (82 kg) | Jr | Central High School | Champaign, IL |
| C | 21 | Stan Simpson (redshirt) | 6 ft 9 in (2.06 m) | 220 lb (100 kg) | Fr | Simeon High School | Chicago, IL |
| F | 23 | Dominique Keller | 6 ft 7 in (2.01 m) | 230 lb (104 kg) | Jr | Memorial High School | Port Arthur, TX |
| F | 24 | Mike Davis | 6 ft 9 in (2.06 m) | 210 lb (95 kg) | So | T. C. Williams High School | Alexandria, VA |
| G | 25 | Calvin Brock | 6 ft 5 in (1.96 m) | 200 lb (91 kg) | RS Sr | Simeon High School | Chicago, IL |
| F | 30 | Bill Cole | 6 ft 9 in (2.06 m) | 215 lb (98 kg) | So | Richwoods High School | Peoria, IL |
| G | 32 | Demetri McCamey | 6 ft 3 in (1.91 m) | 205 lb (93 kg) | So | St. Joseph High School | Bellwood, IL |
| G | 33 | Alex Legion | 6 ft 5 in (1.96 m) | 200 lb (91 kg) | So | Oak Hill Academy/University of Kentucky | Detroit, MI |
| F | 34 | C. J. Jackson | 6 ft 8 in (2.03 m) | 265 lb (120 kg) | RS Jr | Tri-County High School | Buena Vista, GA |
| C | 50 | Richard Semrau | 6 ft 10 in (2.08 m) | 240 lb (109 kg) | RS So | Lutheran West High School | Grafton, OH |
| C | 54 | Mike Tisdale | 7 ft 1 in (2.16 m) | 235 lb (107 kg) | So | Riverton High School | Riverton, IL |

Head coach

- Bruce Weber (Wisconsin-Milwaukee)

Assistant coach(es)

- Jerrance Howard (Illinois) (interim)
- Wayne McClain (Illinois State)
- Jay Price (Kansas)

Legend

- (C) Team captain
- (S) Suspended
- (I) Ineligible
- (W) Walk-on
- Injured
- Current redshirt

Roster

== Schedule ==
| Date time, TV | Rank^{#} | Opponent^{#} | Result | Record | Site (attendance) city, state |
Exhibition
| 10/31/08*; 5:30 pm | | Florida Southern | W 82–61 | | Assembly Hall (13,370); Champaign, IL |
| 11/6/08*; 7:00 pm | | Lewis | W 62–56 | | Assembly Hall (13,814); Champaign, IL |
Non-conference regular season
| 11/14/08*; 8:30pm, Big Ten Network.com | | Eastern Washington | W 66–50 | 1–0 | Assembly Hall (14,442); Champaign, IL |
| 11/16/08*; 4:30pm, Big Ten Network.com | | Texas A&M–Corpus Christi | W 72–53 | 2–0 | Assembly Hall (14,394); Champaign, IL |
| 11/20/08*; 7:00pm, FSN | | at Vanderbilt | W 69–63 | 3–0 | Memorial Gymnasium (12,630); Nashville, TN |
| 11/23/08*; 3:00pm, BTN | | Jackson State | W 78–64 | 4–0 | Assembly Hall (13,865); Champaign, IL |
| 11/28/08*; 5:00pm, Fox College Sports | | vs. Kent State; South Padre Island Invitational | W 69–63 ^{OT} | 5–0 | South Padre Island, TX (1,423) |
| 11/29/08*; 7:30pm, Fox College Sports | | vs. Tulsa; South Padre Island Invitational | W 48–44 | 6–0 | South Padre Island, TX (1,712) |
| 12/02/08*; 6:30pm, ESPN2 | | Clemson; ACC–Big Ten Challenge | L 74–76 | 6–1 | Assembly Hall (14,741); Champaign, IL |
| 12/06/08*; 11:00am, ESPNU | | vs. Georgia | W 76–42 | 7–1 | United Center (12,139); Chicago, IL |
| 12/08/08*; 7:00pm, BTN | | Hawaii | W 68–58 | 8–1 | Assembly Hall (14,303); Champaign, IL |
| 12/10/08*; 7:00pm, BTN | | Chicago State | W 89–50 | 9–1 | Assembly Hall (14,101); Champaign, IL |
| 12/20/08*; 7:00pm, BTN | | Detroit | W 82–51 | 10–1 | Assembly Hall (14,594); Champaign, IL |
| 12/23/08*; 6:30pm, ESPN2 | | vs. No. 25 Missouri; Braggin' Rights | W 75–59 | 11–1 | Scottrade Center (19,586); St. Louis, MO |
| 12/28/08*; 1:00pm, BTN | | Eastern Michigan | W 62–53 | 12–1 | Assembly Hall (16,288); Champaign, IL |
Conference Regular Season
| 12/30/08; 6:00pm, ESPN2 | | at No. 9 Purdue | W 71–67 ^{OT} | 13–1 (1–0) | Mackey Arena (14,036); West Lafayette, IN |
| 01/04/09; 11:00am, BTN | | at No. 23 Michigan | L 64–74 | 13–2 (1–1) | Crisler Arena (12,912); Ann Arbor, MI |
| 01/10/09; 2:00pm, BTN | | Indiana; Rivalry | W 76–45 | 14–2 (2–1) | Assembly Hall (16,618); Champaign, IL |
| 01/14/09; 7:30pm, BTN | | No. 25 Michigan | W 66–51 | 15–2 (3–1) | Assembly Hall (15,535); Champaign, IL |
| 01/17/09; 3:00pm, ESPN | | at No. 7 Michigan State | L 57–63 | 15–3 (3–2) | Breslin Center (14,759); East Lansing, MI |
| 01/20/09; 6:00pm, ESPN | No. 25 | Ohio State | W 67–49 | 16–3 (4–2)) | Assembly Hall (15,549); Champaign, IL |
| 01/24/09; 3:00pm, ESPN | No. 25 | Wisconsin | W 64–57 | 17–3 (5–2) | Assembly Hall (16,618); Champaign, IL |
| 01/29/09; 8:00pm, BTN | No. 19 | at Minnesota | L 36–59 | 17–4 (5–3) | Williams Arena (14,625); Minneapolis, MN |
| 02/01/09; 1:00pm, BTN | No. 19 | Iowa; Rivalry | W 62–54 | 18–4 (6–3) | Assembly Hall (16,618); Champaign, IL |
| 02/05/09; 8:00pm, ESPN | No. 23 | at Wisconsin | L 50–63 | 18–5 (6–4) | Kohl Center (17,230); Madison, WI |
| 02/08/09; 12:00pm, CBS | No. 23 | No. 12 Purdue | W 66–48 | 19–5 (7–4) | Assembly Hall (16,618); Champaign, IL |
| 02/12/09; 8:00pm, ESPN2 | No. 22 | at Northwestern; Rivalry | W 60–59 | 20–5 (8–4) | Welsh-Ryan Arena (8,117); Evanston, IL |
| 02/15/09; 12:00pm, CBS | No. 22 | at Indiana; Rivalry | W 65–52 | 21–5 (9–4) | Assembly Hall (17,346); Bloomington, IN |
| 02/18/09; 6:00pm, BTN | No. 18 | Penn State | L 33–38 | 21–6 (9–5) | Assembly Hall (16,200); Champaign, IL |
| 02/22/09; 12:00 pm, CBS | No. 18 | at Ohio State | W 70–68 | 22–6 (10–5) | Value City Arena (19,049); Columbus, OH |
| 02/26/09; 6:00pm, BTN | No. 20 | Minnesota | W 52–41 | 23–6 (11–5) | Assembly Hall (16,395); Champaign, IL |
| 03/01/09; 4:00pm, CBS | No. 20 | No. 9 Michigan State | L 66–74 | 23–7 (11–6) | Assembly Hall (16,618); Champaign, IL |
| 03/05/09; 9:00pm, ESPN/ESPN2 | No. 23 | at Penn State | L 63–64 | 23–8 (11–7) | Bryce Jordan Center (13,091); University Park, PA |
Big Ten tournament
| 03/13/09; 6:30pm, BTN | (2) | vs. (7) Michigan; Quarterfinals | W 60–50 | 24–8 | Conseco Fieldhouse (14,647); Indianapolis, IN |
| 03/14/09; 4:30pm, CBS | (2) | vs. (3) No. 24 Purdue; Semifinals | L 56–66 | 24–9 | Conseco Fieldhouse (15,728); Indianapolis, IN |
NCAA Tournament
| 03/19/09; 9:30pm, CBS | (5 S) | vs. (12 S) Western Kentucky; First Round | L 72–76 | 24–10 | Rose Garden (17,169); Portland, OR |
*Non-conference game. ^{#}Rankings from AP Poll. (#) Tournament seedings in parentheses. All times are in Central Time.

== Rankings ==
Ranking movements Legend: ██ Increase in ranking ██ Decrease in ranking — = Not ranked т = Tied with team above or below
| | Week | | | | | | | | | | | | | | | | | | | |
| Poll | Pre | 1 | 2 | 3 | 4 | 5 | 6 | 7 | 8 | 9 | 10 | 11 | 12 | 13 | 14 | 15 | 16 | 17 | 18 | Final |
|---|---|---|---|---|---|---|---|---|---|---|---|---|---|---|---|---|---|---|---|---|
| AP | | | | | | | | | | | 25 | 19 | 23 | 22 | 18 | 20 | 23 | — | | Not released |
| Coaches | | | | | | | | | | | 25 т | 20 | 21 | 20 | 16 | 20 | 23 | 25 | — | |

== Season statistics ==
Legend
| GP | Games played | GS | Games started | Avg | Average per game |
| FG | Field-goals made | FGA | Field-goal attempts | Off | Offensive rebounds |
| Def | Defensive rebounds | A | Assists | TO | Turnovers |
| Blk | Blocks | Stl | Steals | High | Team high |

Individual player statistics
| | | | Minutes | | Scoring | | Total FGs | | | 3-point FGs | | | Free-throws | | | Rebounds | | | | | | | |
| Player | GP | GS | Tot | Avg | Pts | Avg | FG | FGA | Pct | 3FG | 3FA | Pct | FT | FTA | Pct | Off | Def | Tot | Avg | A | TO | Blk | Stl |
|---|---|---|---|---|---|---|---|---|---|---|---|---|---|---|---|---|---|---|---|---|---|---|---|
| McCamey, Demetri | 34 | 32 | 1040 | 30.6 | 391 | 11.5 | 140 | 341 | .411 | 56 | 179 | .313 | 55 | 72 | .764 | 11 | 79 | 90 | 2.6 | 156 | 83 | 7 | 32 |
| Davis, Mike | 34 | 34 | 1045 | 30.7 | 383 | 11.3 | 171 | 321 | .533 | 0 | 0 | .000 | 41 | 60 | .683 | 60 | 215 | 275 | 8.1 | 67 | 51 | 22 | 23 |
| Tisdale, Mike | 34 | 34 | 841 | 24.7 | 346 | 10.2 | 147 | 277 | .531 | 1 | 5 | .200 | 51 | 64 | .797 | 44 | 91 | 135 | 4.0 | 19 | 47 | 48 | 11 |
| Meacham, Trent | 34 | 34 | 1046 | 30.8 | 346 | 10.2 | 114 | 270 | .422 | 69 | 164 | .421 | 49 | 58 | .845 | 8 | 76 | 84 | 2.5 | 92 | 36 | 4 | 31 |
| Keller, Dominique | 34 | 0 | 428 | 12.6 | 202 | 5.9 | 86 | 165 | .521 | 9 | 22 | .409 | 21 | 32 | .656 | 29 | 50 | 79 | 2.3 | 7 | 30 | 18 | 10 |
| Frazier, Chester | 31 | 31 | 1029 | 33.2 | 178 | 5.7 | 60 | 134 | .448 | 26 | 68 | .382 | 32 | 48 | .667 | 41 | 107 | 148 | 4.8 | 164 | 68 | 9 | 43 |
| Brock, Calvin | 34 | 5 | 593 | 17.4 | 180 | 5.3 | 73 | 164 | .445 | 7 | 23 | .304 | 27 | 43 | .628 | 43 | 66 | 109 | 3.2 | 31 | 37 | 6 | 24 |
| Legion, Alex | 22 | 0 | 244 | 11.1 | 77 | 3.5 | 28 | 97 | .289 | 12 | 50 | .240 | 9 | 12 | .750 | 9 | 23 | 32 | 1.5 | 11 | 18 | 1 | 8 |
| Cole, Bill | 17 | 0 | 76 | 4.5 | 27 | 1.6 | 9 | 25 | .360 | 6 | 16 | .375 | 3 | 9 | .333 | 5 | 8 | 13 | 0.8 | 4 | 2 | 3 | 1 |
| Semrau, Richard | 21 | 0 | 190 | 9.0 | 29 | 1.4 | 13 | 28 | .464 | 0 | 0 | .000 | 3 | 7 | .429 | 10 | 22 | 32 | 1.5 | 6 | 15 | 2 | 5 |
| Jordan, Jeff | 33 | 0 | 278 | 8.4 | 32 | 1.0 | 14 | 32 | .438 | 1 | 3 | .333 | 3 | 8 | .375 | 3 | 9 | 12 | 0.4 | 33 | 13 | 1 | 6 |
| Jackson, C.J. | 13 | 0 | 22 | 1.7 | 9 | 0.7 | 3 | 3 | 1.000 | 0 | 0 | .000 | 3 | 4 | .750 | 4 | 2 | 6 | 0.5 | 1 | 5 | 1 | 2 |
| Chisholm, Bubba | 14 | 0 | 18 | 1.3 | 4 | 0.3 | 1 | 8 | .125 | 1 | 7 | .143 | 1 | 2 | .500 | 0 | 1 | 1 | 0.1 | 4 | 1 | 0 | 3 |
| Team | | | | | | | | | | | | | | | | 53 | 58 | 111 | | | 14 | | |
| Total | 34 | | 6850 | | 2204 | 64.8 | 859 | 1865 | .461 | 188 | 537 | .350 | 298 | 419 | .711 | 320 | 807 | 1127 | 33.1 | 595 | 420 | 122 | 199 |
| Opponents | 34 | | 6851 | | 1944 | 57.2 | 730 | 1847 | .395 | 173 | 584 | .296 | 311 | 493 | .631 | 392 | 739 | 1131 | 33.3 | 396 | 467 | 80 | 196 |
