= 2008–09 Bowling Green Falcons men's basketball team =

American college basketball season

2008–09 Bowling Green Falcons men's basketball

MAC Regular Season Champions MAC East Division Champions

National Invitation Tournament, First Round
- Conference: Mid-American Conference
- East
- Record: 19–14 (11–5 MAC)
- Head coach: Louis Orr
- Assistant coaches: LaMonta Stone; George Jackson; Louis Twigg
- Home arena: Anderson Arena

2008–09 Mid-American Conference men's basketball standings
	Conf.				Overall
Team	W		L	PCT	W		L	PCT
East
Bowling Green	11	–	5	.688	19	–	14	.576
Buffalo	11	–	5	.688	21	–	12	.636
Miami	10	–	6	.625	17	–	13	.567
Akron †	10	–	6	.625	23	–	13	.639
Kent State	10	–	6	.625	19	–	15	.559
Ohio	7	–	9	.438	15	–	17	.469
West
Ball State	7	–	9	.438	14	–	17	.452
Central Michigan	7	–	9	.438	12	–	19	.387
Western Michigan	7	–	9	.438	10	–	21	.323
Eastern Michigan	6	–	10	.375	8	–	24	.250
Northern Illinois	5	–	11	.313	10	–	20	.333
Toledo	5	–	11	.313	7	–	25	.219
† Conference tournament winner Rankings from AP Poll

The 2008–09 Bowling Green Falcons men's basketball team was the 93rd collegiate basketball team fielded by Bowling Green State University and played their home games at Anderson Arena on the BGSU campus. They were defeated in the semifinals of the MAC tournament by Akron. The Falcons earned an invitation to the 2009 National Invitation Tournament, where they were defeated in the first round by Creighton.

== Previous season ==
The Falcons looked to improve on their record in 2007–08 after finishing 13–17 (7–9 MAC) placing 5th in the East Division (9th overall) and falling to rival Toledo in the MAC Tournament first round in coach Louis Orr's first season as head coach.

== Coaching staff ==
Name	Type	College	Graduating year
Louis Orr	Head coach	Syracuse	1980
LaMonta Stone	Assistant coach	Wayne State	1999
George Jackson	Assistant coach	Wittenberg	1979
Louis Twigg	Assistant coach	Temple	2002
Dave Clarke	Director of Basketball Operations	Ferris State	2005
Chad Young	Athletic trainer		

== Preseason ==
=== Recruiting ===
College recruiting (2008–09)
Name	Hometown	School	Height	Weight	Commit date
Darnell Brown; G	Beverly Hills, MI	Detroit Country Day School	6 ft 3 in (1.91 m)	195 lb (88 kg)	Sep 30, 2008
Darnell Brown; G	Recruit ratings: Scout: Rivals:				
Austin Calhoun; F	Southfield, MI	Southfield HS	6 ft 7 in (2.01 m)	190 lb (86 kg)	
Austin Calhoun; F	Recruit ratings: Rivals:				
Scott Thomas; F	Delaware, OH	Buckeye Valley HS	6 ft 6 in (1.98 m)	190 lb (86 kg)	
Scott Thomas; F	Recruit ratings: Rivals:				
Overall recruit ranking:
Note: In many cases, Scout, Rivals, 247Sports, On3, and ESPN may conflict in their listings of height and weight.; In these cases, the average was taken. ESPN grades are on a 100-point scale.; Sources: "Bowling Green Commit List for 2008". Rivals.; "Bowling Green: Commits". Scout.; "Scout.com Team Recruiting Rankings". Scout.; "2008–09 Team Ranking". Rivals.

== Roster ==
BGSU Men's Basketball; Current Roster
Head coach: Louis Orr
G	1	Brian Moten	Senior	6'4", 190 lb	(Saginaw, MI)
F	2	Darryl Clements	Senior	6'4", 200 lb	(Detroit, MI)
F	10	Scott Thomas	Freshman	6'6", 185 lb	(Delaware, OH)
G	12	Ryan Sims	Junior	6'1", 180 lb	(Fort Wayne, IN)
G	14	Joe Jakubowski	Sophomore	6'2", 180 lb	(Rossford, OH)
F	15	Austin Calhoun	Freshman	6'7", 218 lb	(Southfield, MI)
F	20	Nate Miller	Senior	6'4", 240 lb	(Springfield, OH)
G	22	Darnell Brown	Fresnhman	6'2", 200 lb	(Detroit, MI)
F	23	Chris Knight	Sophomore	6'7", 210 lb	(Cincinnati, OH)
F	24	Cameron Madlock	Sophomore	6'8", 200 lb	(Whitefish Bay, WI)
G	32	Matt Karaffa	Junior	6'3", 210 lb	(West Chester, OH)
F	34	Erik Marschall	Junior	6'7", 235 lb	(New London, OH)
C	45	Otis Polk	Junior	6'9", 280 lb	(Detroit, MI)
C	50	Marc Larson	Junior	6'9", 245 lb	(Mattawan, MI)

== Schedule ==
Date time, TV	Rank^{#}	Opponent^{#}	Result	Record	Site city, state
Exhibition
11/08/08*; 2:00pm		Ashland; Exhibition	W 87–63	0–0	Anderson Arena; Bowling Green, OH
Regular season
11/14/08*; 7:00pm		vs. Georgia State; NABC Classic	W 77–76 ^{OT}	1–0	Williams Arena; Minneapolis, MN
11/15/08*; 9:00pm		at Minnesota; NABC Classic	L 61–68	1–1	Williams Arena; Minneapolis, MN
11/16/08*; 5:00pm		vs. Concordia (St. Paul); NABC Classic	W 81–63	2–1	Williams Arena; Minneapolis, MN
11/20/08*; 7:00pm, BCSN		Wayne State (MI)	W 80–48	3–1	Anderson Arena; Bowling Green, OH
11/24/08*; 8:00pm, BTN		at Ohio State	L 57–61	3–2	Value City Arena; Columbus, OH
12/01/08*; 7:30pm		at Savannah State	L 54–57	3–3	Tiger Arena; Savannah, GA
12/06/08*; 8:05pm		at Illinois State	L 65–78	3–4	Redbird Arena; Normal, IL
12/14/08*; 6:00pm, BCSN		Detroit	W 58–38	4–4	Anderson Arena; Bowling Green, OH
12/20/08*; 7:00pm		at Central Arkansas	L 65–67	4–5	Farris Center; Conway, AR
12/22/08*; 7:00pm, BCSN		Towson	W 77–58	5–5	Anderson Arena; Bowling Green, OH
12/28/08*; 2:00pm, BCSN		Eastern Illinois	W 78–60	6–5	Anderson Arena; Bowling Green, OH
12/31/08*; 4:00pm		at Duquesne	L 65–76	6–6	A.J. Palumbo Center; Pittsburgh, PA
01/03/09*; 2:00pm, BCSN		Fordham	W 65–59	7–6	Anderson Arena; Bowling Green, OH
01/10/09; 2:00pm		Buffalo	W 86–82	8–6 (1–0)	Anderson Arena; Bowling Green, OH
01/14/09; 7:00pm		at Kent State	L 48–72	8–7 (1–1)	Memorial Athletic and Convocation Center; Kent, OH
01/17/09; 4:30pm, ESPNU		Akron	L 52–62	8–8 (1–2)	Anderson Arena; Bowling Green, OH
01/20/09; 7:00pm, BCSN		Miami (OH)	L 60–67	8–9 (1–3)	Anderson Arena; Bowling Green, OH
01/24/09; 2:00pm		at Ohio	W 52–51	9–9 (2–3)	Convocation Center; Athens, OH
01/28/09; 7:00pm, BCSN		Ball State	W 62–58	10–9 (3–3)	Anderson Arena; Bowling Green, OH]
01/31/09; 4:00pm		at Northern Illinois	W 69–61	11–9 (4–3)	Convocation Center; DeKalb, IL
02/04/09; 7:00pm, BCSN		Western Michigan	W 68–61	12–9 (5–3)	Anderson Arena; Bowling Green, OH
02/07/09; 7:00pm		at Central Michigan	W 67–61	13–9 (6–3)	Daniel P. Rose Center; Mt. Pleasant, MI
02/11/09; 7:00pm		at Toledo	W 59–54	14–9 (7–3)	Savage Hall; Toledo, OH
02/15/09; 7:00pm, BCSN		Eastern Michigan	L 57–65	14–10 (7–4)	Anderson Arena; Bowling Green, OH
02/18/09; 7:00pm		at Buffalo	W 59–48	15–10 (8–4)	Alumni Arena; Buffalo, NY
02/21/09*; BCSN		Canisius; ESPNU BracketBusters	L 66–71	15–11 (8–4)	Anderson Arena; Bowling Green, OH
02/26/08; 7:00pm, FS Ohio		Kent State	W 67–66	16–11 (9–4)	Anderson Arena; Bowling Green, OH
03/01/09; 2:00pm		at Akron	W 50–46	17–11 (10–4)	James A. Rhodes Arena; Akron, OH
03/05/09		at Miami (OH)	L 45–50 ^{OT}	17–12 (10–5)	Millett Hall; Oxford, OH
03/08/09; 2:00pm, BCSN		Ohio	W 75–41	18–12 (11–5)	Anderson Arena; Bowling Green, OH
MAC tournament
03/12/09		Ohio; MAC Tournament quarterfinals	W 74–61	19–12 (11–5)	Quicken Loans Arena; Cleveland, OH
03/13/09		Akron; MAC Tournament semifinals	L 55–63	19–13 (11–5)	Quicken Loans Arena; Cleveland, OH
NIT
03/18/09; 8:00pm		Creighton; NIT First Round	L 71–73	19–14 (11–5)	Qwest Center Omaha; Omaha, NE
*Non-conference game. ^{#}Rankings from Coaches' Poll. (#) Tournament seedings in parentheses. All times are in Eastern Time.
