= 2008–09 Purdue Boilermakers men's basketball team =

American college basketball season

2008–09 Purdue Boilermakers men's basketball

Big Ten tournament Champions

NCAA tournament, Sweet Sixteen
- Conference: Big Ten Conference

Ranking
- Coaches: No. 14
- AP: No. 17
- Record: 27–10 (11–7 Big Ten)
- Head coach: Matt Painter
- Assistant coaches: Paul Lusk; Rick Ray; Jack Owens
- Home arena: Mackey Arena

2008–09 Big Ten Conference men's basketball standings
	Conf.				Overall
Team	W		L	PCT	W		L	PCT
No. 8 Michigan State	15	–	3	.833	31	–	7	.816
No. 17 Purdue†	11	–	7	.611	27	–	10	.730
Illinois	11	–	7	.611	24	–	10	.706
Penn State	10	–	8	.556	27	–	11	.711
Ohio State	10	–	8	.556	22	–	11	.667
Wisconsin	10	–	8	.556	20	–	13	.606
Minnesota	9	–	9	.500	22	–	11	.667
Michigan	9	–	9	.500	21	–	14	.600
Northwestern	8	–	10	.444	17	–	14	.548
Iowa	5	–	13	.278	15	–	17	.469
Indiana	1	–	17	.056	6	–	25	.194
† 2009 Big Ten tournament winner Rankings from AP poll

The 2008–09 Purdue Boilermakers men's basketball team represented Purdue University. The head coach was Matt Painter, then in his 4th season with the Boilers. The team played its home games in Mackey Arena in West Lafayette, Indiana, and is a member of the Big Ten Conference. The Boilermakers finished tied for second in the conference's regular season, and captured their first Big Ten tournament crown, defeating Ohio State 65–61 in the final game. In the NCAA tournament, the Boilers reached the Sweet Sixteen for the first time since 2000, where they fell to the Connecticut Huskies.

== Season Notes ==
- On November 14, 2008, Purdue set a school record in the first game of the season against Detroit with only 3 turnovers in a game. The prior record was set during the 1969 NCAA tournament championship game against UCLA.
- By playing three games in their conference tournament championship and three games in the NCAA Tournament giving the Boilers a total of 37 games, Purdue played more games in the 2008–09 season than any other season in the program's history.
- Keaton Grant, Marcus Green, JaJuan Johnson and E'Twaun Moore hold the school record for most games played in a season with 37 each.
- Although opening his first season as Purdue's head coach with only 9 wins, Matt Painter collected more wins in his first four seasons (2005–2009) than Gene Keady's (1980–1984) 82, with 83.
- Senior forward Marcus Green set a school record with career games as a Boiler (2005–2009) with 183, breaking Brian Cardinal and Mike Robinson's 182 mark.
- Freshman guard Lewis Jackson set the Freshman record with most games played in a Freshman season with 36.
- JaJuan Johnson was named First Team All-Big Ten.
- Lewis Jackson became the fourth Boilermaker in three years to be named to the Big Ten All-Freshman Team.

== Roster ==
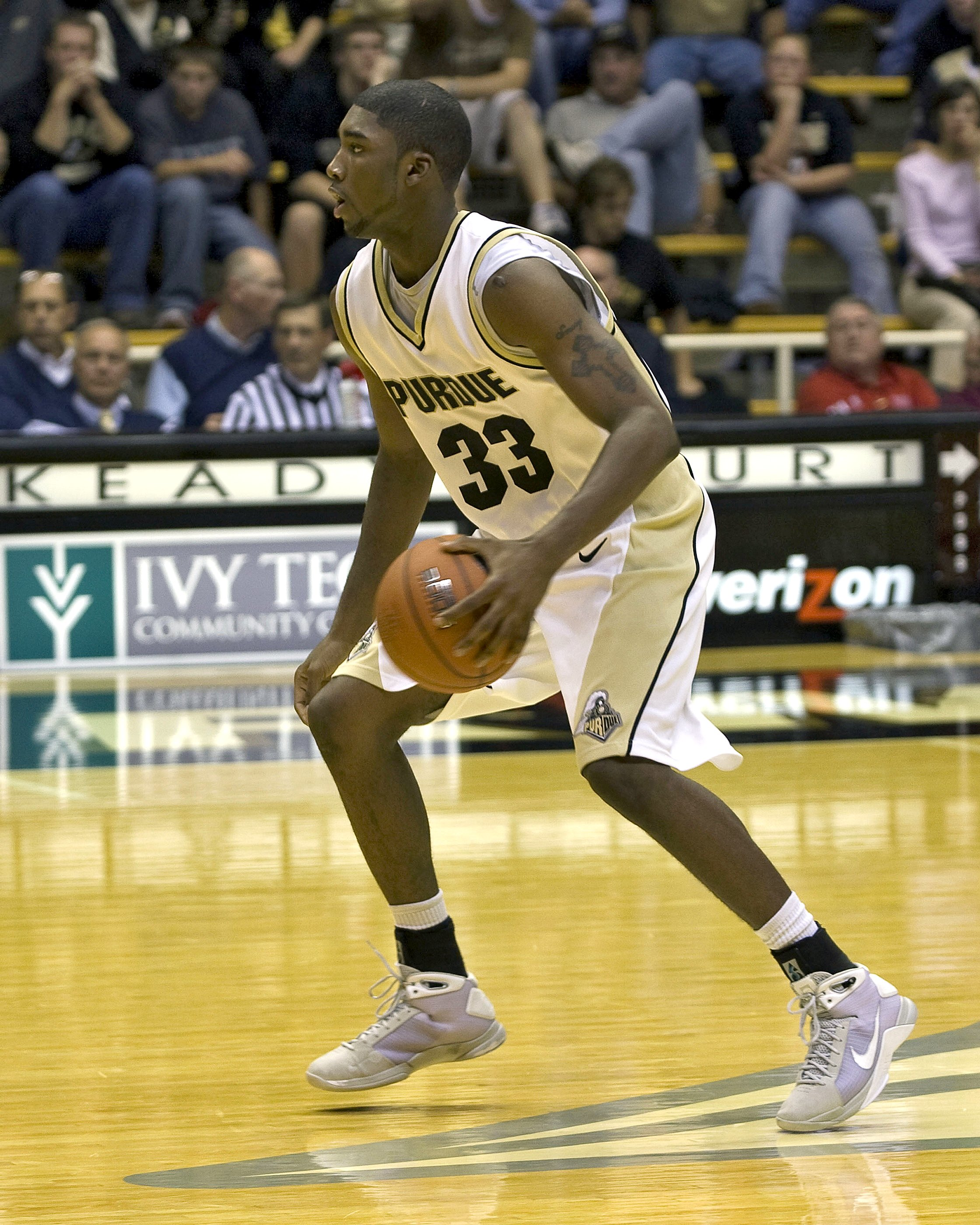
E'Twaun Moore led the team in scoring.

Name	#	Position	Height	Weight	Year	Home Town	Season Honors
Nemanja Calasan	44	Forward	6–9	250	Senior	Srbinje, Bosnia & Herzegovina	
Keaton Grant	5	Guard	6–4	207	Junior	Kissimmee, FL	
Marcus Green	20	Guard	6–4	229	Senior	Franklin Park, IL	
John Hart	32	Guard	6–2	180	Redshirted	Beech Grove, IN	
Robbie Hummel	4	Forward	6–8	208	Sophomore	Valparaiso, IN	Third-Team All-Big Ten; Big Ten tournament MVP; All-Big Ten tournament Team; Big Ten Player of the Week (12/15, 12/22); Academic All-Big Ten
Lewis Jackson	23	Guard	5–9	165	Freshman	Decatur, IL	Big Ten All-Freshman Team
JaJuan Johnson	25	Forward / Center	6–10	215	Sophomore	Indianapolis, IN	First-Team All-Big Ten Team; Big Ten All-Defensive Team; All-Big Ten tournament Team
Chris Kramer	3	Guard	6–3	205	Junior	Huntington, IN	Big Ten All-Defensive Team; Academic All-Big Ten
E'Twaun Moore	33	Guard	6–3	180	Sophomore	East Chicago, IN	Second-Team All-Big Ten; All-Big Ten tournament Team; Big Ten Player of the Week (12/1); Academic All-Big Ten
Bobby Riddell	11	Guard	5–9	163	Senior	Lafayette, IN	Academic All-Big Ten
Chris Reid	55	Forward	6–9	251	Junior	Castro Valley, CA	
Ryne Smith	24	Guard	6–3	175	Freshman	Toledo, OH	
Mark Wohlford	30	Guard	6–0	185	Junior	Columbus, IN	Academic All-Big Ten

=== Incoming Recruits ===
College recruiting information
Name	Hometown	School	Height	Weight	Commit date
John Hart; SG	Beech Grove, IN	Beech Grove High School	6 ft 2 in (1.88 m)	180 lb (82 kg)	May 8, 2008
John Hart; SG	Recruit ratings: Scout: Rivals: (40)				
Lewis Jackson; PG	Decatur, IL	Eisenhower High School	5 ft 9 in (1.75 m)	175 lb (79 kg)	Aug 9, 2007
Lewis Jackson; PG	Recruit ratings: Scout: Rivals: (87)				
Ryne Smith; SG	Toledo, OH	Whitmer High School	6 ft 3 in (1.91 m)	175 lb (79 kg)	Aug 2, 2007
Ryne Smith; SG	Recruit ratings: Scout: Rivals: (40)				
Overall recruit ranking:
Note: In many cases, Scout, Rivals, 247Sports, On3, and ESPN may conflict in their listings of height and weight.; In these cases, the average was taken. ESPN grades are on a 100-point scale.; Sources: "2008 Purdue Signees". Rivals.; "2008 Purdue Signees". Scout.; "2008 Purdue Signees". ESPN.; "Scout.com Team Recruiting Rankings". Scout.; "2008 Team Ranking". Rivals.

== Schedule ==
Date time, TV	Rank^{#}	Opponent^{#}	Result	Record	Site (attendance) city, state
Exhibition
October 31*; 9:00 pm, BTN Online	No. 10	Florida Southern; Exhibition	W 94–62		Mackey Arena; West Lafayette, IN
November 8*; 7:00 pm, BTN Online	No. 10	Northern State; Exhibition	W 81–61		Mackey Arena; West Lafayette, IN
Regular season
November 14*; 9:00 pm, ESPN360	No. 10	Detroit Mercy	W 82–50	1–0 (0–0)	Mackey Arena (13,402); West Lafayette, IN
November 17*; 7:00 pm ET, ESPN2	No. 10	Eastern Michigan; NIT Season Tip-Off Opening Round	W 87–58	2–0 (0–0)	Mackey Arena (13,356); West Lafayette, IN
November 18*; 7:00 pm ET, ESPNU	No. 10	Loyola (Chicago); NIT Season Tip-Off Quarter-Finals	W 78–46	3–0 (0–0)	Mackey Arena (13,343); West Lafayette, IN
November 22*; 6:00 pm ET, BTN Online	No. 10	Coppin State	W 66–46	4–0 (0–0)	Mackey Arena (14,123); West Lafayette, IN
November 26*; 7:00 pm ET, ESPN2	No. 9	vs. Boston College; NIT Season Tip-Off Semi-Finals	W 71–64	5–0 (0–0)	Madison Square Garden (4,438); New York, NY
November 28*; 3:30 pm ET, ESPN2	No. 9	vs. No. 13 Oklahoma; NIT Season Tip-Off Finals	L 82–87 ^{OT}	5–1 (0–0)	Madison Square Garden (3,670); New York, NY
December 2*; 9:00 pm ET, ESPN	No. 10	No. 4 Duke; ACC–Big Ten Challenge	L 60–76	5–2 (0–0)	Mackey Arena (14,123); West Lafayette, IN
December 6*; 8:00 pm, BTN	No. 10	Arkansas-Pine Bluff	W 90–42	6–2 (0–0)	Mackey Arena (13,448); West Lafayette, IN
December 9*; 7:00 pm ET, TBA	No. 17	at Ball State	W 68–39	7–2 (0–0)	Worthen Arena (8,381); Muncie, IN
December 13*; 2:00 pm, BTN	No. 17	Indiana State	W 76–62	8–2 (0–0)	Mackey Arena (14,123); West Lafayette, IN
December 20*; 4:00 pm ET, CBS	No. 18	vs. No. 20 Davidson; The Wooden Tradition	W 76–58	9–2 (0–0)	Conseco Fieldhouse (12,754); Indianapolis, IN
December 22*; 7:00 pm, ESPN 360	No. 15	IPFW	W 70–55	10–2 (0–0)	Mackey Arena (10,176); West Lafayette, IN
December 28*; 4:00 pm, BTN	No. 15	Valparaiso	W 59–45	11–2 (0–0)	Mackey Arena (13,916); West Lafayette, IN
December 30; 7:00 pm ET, ESPN2	No. 11	Illinois	L 67–71 ^{OT}	11–3 (0–1)	Mackey Arena (14,036); West Lafayette, IN
January 6; 9:00 pm ET, BTN	No. 14	at Penn State	L 64–67	11–4 (0–2)	Bryce Jordan Center (4,404); State College, PA
January 11; 1:30 pm ET, CBS	No. 14	Wisconsin	W 65–52	12–4 (1–2)	Mackey Arena (14,123); West Lafayette, IN
January 15; 7:00 pm ET, ESPN2	No. 19	at Northwestern	W 63–61	13–4 (2–2)	Welsh-Ryan Arena (4,473); Evanston, IL
January 18; 12:00 pm ET, BTN	No. 19	Iowa	W 75–53	14–4 (3–2)	Mackey Arena (14,123); West Lafayette, IN
January 22; 7:00 pm ET, ESPN2	No. 18	at No. 20 Minnesota	W 70–62	15–4 (4–2)	Williams Arena (14,625); Minneapolis, MN
January 27; 9:00 pm ET, ESPN	No. 17	at Wisconsin	W 64–63	16–4 (5–2)	Kohl Center (17,230); Madison, WI
January 30; 1:00 pm ET, CBS	No. 17	Michigan	W 67–49	17–4 (6–2)	Mackey Arena (14,123); West Lafayette, IN
February 3; 7:00 pm ET, ESPN	No. 13	at Ohio State	L 72-80 ^{OT}	17–5 (6–3)	Value City Arena (17,012); Columbus, OH
February 8; 1:00 pm ET, CBS	No. 13	at No. 21 Illinois	L 48-66	17–6 (6–4)	Assembly Hall (16,618); Champaign, IL
February 11; 6:30 pm ET, BTN	No. 23	Penn State	W 61–47	18–6 (7–4)	Mackey Arena (14,013); West Lafayette, IN
February 14; 4:00 pm ET, BTN	No. 23	at Iowa	W 49–45	19–6 (8–4)	Carver-Hawkeye Arena (14,665); Iowa City, IA
February 17; 7:00 pm ET, ESPN	No. 21	No. 5 Michigan State	W 72–54	20–6 (9–4)	Mackey Arena (14,123); West Lafayette, IN
February 21; 2:00 pm ET, BTN	No. 21	Indiana	W 81–67	21–6 (10–4)	Mackey Arena (14,123); West Lafayette, IN
February 26; 9:00 pm ET, ESPN	No. 16	at Michigan	W 87–78	21–7 (10–5)	Crisler Arena (13,751); Ann Arbor, MI
February 28; 4:00 pm ET, ESPN	No. 16	Ohio State	W 75–50	22–7 (11–5)	Mackey Arena (14,123); West Lafayette, IN
March 4; 6:30 pm ET, BTN	No. 20	Northwestern	L 61–64	22–8 (11–6)	Mackey Arena (13,947); West Lafayette, IN
March 8; 12:00 pm ET, CBS	No. 20	at No. 8 Michigan State	L 51–62	22–9 (11–7)	Breslin Student Events Center (14,759); East Lansing, MI
Big Ten tournament
March 13*; 9:00 pm ET, BTN	No. 24	vs. Penn State; Big Ten tournament Quarter-Finals	W 79–65	23–9	Conseco Fieldhouse (14,647); Indianapolis, IN
March 14*; 4:00 pm ET, CBS	No. 24	vs. No. 25 Illinois; Big Ten tournament Semi-Finals	W 66–56	24–9	Conseco Fieldhouse (15,728); Indianapolis, IN
March 15*; 3:30 pm ET, CBS	No. 24	vs. Ohio State; Big Ten tournament finals	W 65–61	25–9	Conseco Fieldhouse (12,526); Indianapolis, IN
NCAA tournament
March 19*; 2:30 pm ET, CBS	No. 18 (5)	vs. No. (12) Northern Iowa; First Round	W 61–56	26–9	Rose Garden Arena (N/A); Portland, OR
March 21*; 5:40 pm ET, CBS	No. 18 (5)	vs. No. 14 (4) Washington; Second Round	W 76–74	27–9	Rose Garden Arena (N/A); Portland, OR
March 26*; 7:07 pm ET, CBS	No. 18 (5)	vs. No. 6 (1) Connecticut; Sweet Sixteen	L 60–72	27–10	University of Phoenix Stadium (20,101); Glendale, AZ
*Non-conference game. ^{#}Rankings from Coaches' Poll. (#) Tournament seedings in parentheses. All times are in Eastern Time.

== Rankings ==
Ranking movements Legend: ██ Increase in ranking ██ Decrease in ranking т = Tied with team above or below
	Week																			
Poll	Pre	1	2	3	4	5	6	7	8	9	10	11	12	13	14	15	16	17	18	Final
AP	11	11	10	9	14	13	10	9	14	19	18	16	12	20	19	16	19	24	17	Not released
Coaches	10	10	9	10	17	18	15	11 т	14	19	18	17	13	23	21	16	20	24	18	14

== See also ==
- 2009 NCAA Division I men's basketball tournament
- 2008-09 NCAA Division I men's basketball season
- 2008-09 NCAA Division I men's basketball rankings
- List of NCAA Division I institutions
