= 2008–09 Eastern Michigan Eagles men's basketball team =

American college basketball season

2008–09 Eastern Michigan Eagles men's basketball
- Conference: Mid-American Conference
- West Division
- Record: 8–24 (6–10 MAC)
- Head coach: Charles E. Ramsey (4 season)
- Assistant coaches: Derrick McDowell; Carl Thomas; Andrew Moore
- Home arena: Convocation Center

2008–09 Mid-American Conference men's basketball standings
| | Conf. | | | | Overall |
| Team | W | | L | PCT | W | | L | PCT |
|---|---|---|---|---|---|---|---|---|
East
| Bowling Green | 11 | – | 5 | .688 | 19 | – | 14 | .576 |
| Buffalo | 11 | – | 5 | .688 | 21 | – | 12 | .636 |
| Miami | 10 | – | 6 | .625 | 17 | – | 13 | .567 |
| Akron † | 10 | – | 6 | .625 | 23 | – | 13 | .639 |
| Kent State | 10 | – | 6 | .625 | 19 | – | 15 | .559 |
| Ohio | 7 | – | 9 | .438 | 15 | – | 17 | .469 |
West
| Ball State | 7 | – | 9 | .438 | 14 | – | 17 | .452 |
| Central Michigan | 7 | – | 9 | .438 | 12 | – | 19 | .387 |
| Western Michigan | 7 | – | 9 | .438 | 10 | – | 21 | .323 |
| Eastern Michigan | 6 | – | 10 | .375 | 8 | – | 24 | .250 |
| Northern Illinois | 5 | – | 11 | .313 | 10 | – | 20 | .333 |
| Toledo | 5 | – | 11 | .313 | 7 | – | 25 | .219 |
† Conference tournament winner Rankings from AP Poll

The 2008–09 Eastern Michigan Eagles men's basketball team represented Eastern Michigan University during the 2008–09 NCAA Division I men's basketball season. The Eagles, led by 4th year head coach Charles E. Ramsey, played their home games at the Eastern Michigan University Convocation Center and were members of the West Division of the Mid-American Conference. They finished the season 8–24, 6–10 in MAC play. They team finished 4th in the MAC West. They were knocked out in the 1st round of the MAC Tournament by Central Michigan.

== Roster ==
The team captains were Tyler Jones, Wendale Farrow.

| Number | Name | Position | Height | Weight | Year | Hometown | HS/Previous |
|---|---|---|---|---|---|---|---|
| 3 | Carlos Medlock | Guard | 6–0 | 186 | Senior | Detroit, Michigan | Murray Wright |
| 4 | Daniel Barnes | Guard | 6–2 | 175 | Freshman | Chicago, Illinois | Oak Park |
| 5 | Tyler Jones | Guard | 6–2 | 210 | Senior | Belleville, Michigan | Belleville |
| 10 | Branden Harrison | Forward | 6–8 | 170 | Freshman | Houston, Texas | Milby |
| 12 | L.J. Frazier | Guard | 5–10 | 160 | Redshirt Freshman | Ypsilanti, Michigan | Ypsilanti |
| 13 | Antonio Green | Guard | 6–3 | 192 | Freshman | Inkster, Michigan | Robichaud |
| 15 | Will Cooper | Wing | 6–6 | 180 | Sophomore | Detroit, Michigan | Pershing |
| 20 | Zane Gay | Guard | 6–5 | 201 | Senior | Olivet, Michigan | Olivet |
| 21 | Wendale Farrow | Wing | 6–10 | 210 | Senior | Sacramento, California | American River J.C. |
| 22 | Merlynd Ameti | Guard | 6–0 | 175 | Sophomore | Detroit, Michigan | Annapolis |
| 25 | Justin Dobbins | Forward | 6–8 | 240 | Junior | Cleveland, Ohio | Glenville |
| 32 | Alex Hamo | Guard | 6–2 | 185 | Sophomore | Flint, Michigan | Cincinnati |
| 33 | Brandon Bowdry | Forward | 6–6 | 229 | Sophomore | St. Louis, Missouri | Taylor (Mich.) Truman |
| 34 | Kyle Dodd | Center | 6–11 | 210 | Junior | Rockwood, Ontario | John F. Ross Collegiate and Vocational Institute |
| 54 | Kamil Janton | Center | 6–10 | 230 | Freshman | Tarnow, Poland | Bartlett |

== Coaching staff ==
| Name | Position | College | Graduating year |
|---|---|---|---|
| Charles Ramsey | Head coach | Eastern Michigan University | 1992 |
| Derrick McDowell | Associate Coach | Stetson University | 1983 |
| Carl Thomas | Assistant coach | Eastern Michigan University | 2000 |
| Andrew Moore | Assistant coach | Muskingum College | 1992 |
| Chris Highfield | Director of Basketball Operations | University of Michigan | 2000 |
| Craig LeVasseur | Graduate Assistant | University of Michigan | 2005 |

== Schedule ==
| Date time, TV | Rank^{#} | Opponent^{#} | Result | Record | High points | High rebounds | High assists | Site (attendance) city, state |
|---|---|---|---|---|---|---|---|---|
| November 14, 2008*; 12:00 pm | | Marygrove; Education Day | W 119–48 | 1–0 | 26 – Bowdry | 14 – Bowdry | 7 – Green | Convocation Center (2156); Ypsilanti, MI |
| November 17, 2008*; 7:00 pm, ESPN2 | | at No. 10 Purdue; NIT Season Tip-Off | L 58–87 | 1–1 | 16 – Dobbins | 10 – Farris | 3 – Dobbins, Frazier | Mackey Arena (13356); West Lafayette, IN |
| November 18, 2008*; 4:00 pm | | vs. Georgia; NIT Season Tip-Off | L 60–61 | 1–2 | 22 – Dobbins | 8 – Bowdry | 9 – Frazier | Mackey Arena; West Lafayette, IN |
| November 22, 2008*; 7:00 pm | | at Detroit | L 47–62 | 1–3 | 14 – Frazier | 8 – Bowdry, Farris | 2 – Farris, Frazier | Calihan Hall (2638); Detroit, MI |
| November 24, 2008*; 8:00 pm | | St. John's; NIT Season Tip-Off | L 61–73 | 1–4 | 13 – Bowdry, Dobbins | 6 – Gay | 2 – Bowdry, Dobbins, Farrow | Carnesecca Arena (893); Queens, NY |
| November 24, 2008*; 5:45 pm | | vs. Cornell; NIT Season Tip-Off | L 54–67 | 1–5 | 11 – Bowdry, Frazier | 8 – Gay | 3 – Frazier, Gay | Carnesecca Arena; Queens, NY |
| November 29, 2008*; 1:00 pm | | at Brown | L 51–53 | 1–6 | 13 – Ferris | 5 – Bowdry | 6 – Frazier | Pizzitola Sports Center (633); Providence, RI |
| December 08, 2008*; 7:00 pm | | Wayne State | W 67–47 | 2–6 | 19 – Bowdry | 7 – Bowdry, Harrison | 7 – Frazier | Convocation Center (590); Ypsilanti, MI |
| December 13, 2008*; 4:00 pm | | at Michigan | L 60–91 | 2–7 | 16 – Bowdry | 8 – Dobbins | 2 – Copper, Gay, Jones | Crisler Center (9768); Ann Arbor, MI |
| December 20, 2008*; 4:00 pm | | St. Bonaventure; George Gervin Day | L 78–86 | 2–8 | 21 – Bowdry | 7 – Bowdry | 4 – Frazier | Convocation Center (803); Ypsilanti, MI |
| December 22, 2008*; 7:00 pm | | Oakland | L 53–66 | 2–9 | 17 – Bowdry | 8 – Dobbins | 8 – Dobbins | Convocation Center (389); Ypsilanti, MI |
| December 28, 2008*; 2:00 pm, Big Ten Network | | at Illinois | L 53–62 | 2–10 | 14 – Dobbins | 5 – Bowdry, Ferris | 5 – Bowdry | Assembly Hall (16288); Champaign, IL |
| January 03, 2009*; 2:00 pm | | at Chicago State | L 61–79 | 2–11 | 23 – Bowdry | 10 – Bowdry | 5 – Farris | Emil and Patricia Jones Convocation Center (538); Chicago, IL |
| January 07, 2009*; 7:00 pm | | Temple | L 45–67 | 2–12 | 16 – Bowdry | 7 – Dobbins | 4 – Frazier | Convocation Center (493); Ypsilanti, MI |
| January 10, 2009; 4:00 pm, Ball State Sports Network | | Ball State | L 42–46 | 2–13 (0–1) | 16 – Bowdry | 6 – Dobbins | 2 – Dobbins, Jones | Convocation Center (843); Ypsilanti, MI |
| January 13, 2009; 7:00 pm | | Central Michigan; Michigan MAC Trophy | W 84–77 ^{2OT} | 3–13 (1–1) | 22 – Bowdry, Jones | 14 – Bowdry | 4 – Frazier | Convocation Center (865); Ypsilanti, MI |
| January 17, 2009; 7:00 pm | | at Toledo | L 57–69 | 3–14 (1–2) | 14 – Bowdry | 6 – Bowdry | 3 – Cooper | Savage Arena (6084); Toledo, OH |
| January 20, 2009; 7:00 pm | | at Northern Illinois | L 52–72 | 3–15 (1–3) | 16 – Bowdry | 9 – Bowdry | 1 – Copper, Farris, Frazier, Gay, Jones | Convocation Center (1293); DeKalb, IL |
| January 24, 2009; 4:00 pm | | Western Michigan; Michigan MAC Trophy | L 45–53 | 3–16 (1–4) | 12 – Bowdry | 9 – Bowdry | 3 – Jones | Convocation Center (1663); Ypsilanti, MI |
| January 27, 2009; 7:00 pm | | at Kent State | L 46–58 | 3–17 (1–5) | 19 – Dobbins | 6 – Copper | 3 – Jones | Memorial Athletic and Convocation Center (2447); Kent, OH |
| January 31, 2009; 2:00 pm | | Miami (OH) | L 51–66 | 3–18 (1–6) | 16 – Bowdry | 7 – Dobbins | 3 – Bowdry, Jones | Convocation Center (1285); Ypsilanti, MI |
| February 03, 2009; 7:00 pm | | Akron | L 41–78 | 3–19 (1–7) | 12 – Bowdry | 10 – Dobbins | 2 – Frazier, Green | Convocation Center (313); Ypsilanti, MI |
| February 07, 2009; 5:00pm | | at Ohio | L 45–57 | 3–20 (1–8) | 11 – Bowdry, Dobbins | 8 – Bowdry | 3 – Gay | Convocation Center (5735); Athens, OH |
| February 12, 2009; 7:00 pm | | Buffalo | L 49–58 | 3–21 (1–9) | 11 – Bowdry | 9 – Bowdry | 4 – Bowdry | Convocation Center (467); Ypsilanti, MI |
| February 15, 2009; 7:00 pm, Buckeye Cable Sports Network | | at Bowling Green | L 57–65 | 4–21 (2–9) | 17 – Gay | 12 – Bowdry | 4 – Bowdry | Anderson Arena (2120); Bowling Green, OH |
| February 18, 2009; 7:00 pm | | at Western Michigan; Michigan MAC Trophy | L 38–46 | 4–22 (2–10) | 13 – Bowdry | 12 – Dobbins | 3 – Jones | University Arena (3122); Kalamazoo, MI |
| February 21, 2009*; 4:00 pm | | Georgia State; ESPN Bracket Buster | L 58–63 | 4–23 (2–10) | 13 – Green | 7 – Green | 3 – Bowdry, Dobbins, Frazier | Convocation Center (583); Ypsilanti, MI |
| February 25, 2009; 7:00pm | | Toledo | W 58–49 | 5–23 (3–10) | 17 – Bowdry | 6 – Bowdry | 4 – Gay | Convocation Center (446); Ypsilanti, MI |
| February 28, 2009; 7:00pm | | at Central Michigan; Michigan MAC Trophy | L 55–60 | 6–23 (4–10) | 12 – Bowdry, Gay | 5 – Bowdry, Gay | 2 – Bowdry, Dobbins, Gay | Daniel P. Rose Center (1309); Mount Pleasant, MI |
| March 4, 2009; 7:00pm | | Northern Illinois; Senior Day | L 55–61 | 7–23 (5–10) | 20 – Dobbins | 12 – Bowdry | 6 – Gay | Convocation Center (724); Ypsilanti, MI |
| March 8, 2009; 2:00pm, Ball State Sports Network | | at Ball State | W 55–53 | 8–23 (6–10) | 13 – Bowdry | 11 – Bowdry | 4 – Bowdry, Dobbins | John E. Worthen Arena (3687); Muncie, IN |
| March 10, 2009; 12:00pm | | vs. Central Michigan; MAC Tournament | L 49–62 | 8–24 | 13 – Bowdry | 6 – Bowdry | 2 – Bowdry, Gay, Green, Frazier | Quicken Loans Arena; Cleveland, OH |
*Non-conference game. ^{#}Rankings from AP Poll. (#) Tournament seedings in parentheses.

== Awards ==
All-MAC Second Team

Brandon Bowdry
