= 2008–09 Ohio Bobcats men's basketball team =

American college basketball season

2008–09 Ohio Bobcats men's basketball
- Conference: Mid-American Conference
- East Division
- Record: 15–17 (7–9 MAC)
- Head coach: John Groce (1st season)
- Assistant coaches: Jamall Walker; Chris Holtmann; Dustin Ford
- Home arena: Convocation Center

2008–09 Mid-American Conference men's basketball standings
	Conf.				Overall
Team	W		L	PCT	W		L	PCT
East
Bowling Green	11	–	5	.688	19	–	14	.576
Buffalo	11	–	5	.688	21	–	12	.636
Miami	10	–	6	.625	17	–	13	.567
Akron †	10	–	6	.625	23	–	13	.639
Kent State	10	–	6	.625	19	–	15	.559
Ohio	7	–	9	.438	15	–	17	.469
West
Ball State	7	–	9	.438	14	–	17	.452
Central Michigan	7	–	9	.438	12	–	19	.387
Western Michigan	7	–	9	.438	10	–	21	.323
Eastern Michigan	6	–	10	.375	8	–	24	.250
Northern Illinois	5	–	11	.313	10	–	20	.333
Toledo	5	–	11	.313	7	–	25	.219
† Conference tournament winner Rankings from AP Poll

The 2008–09 Ohio Bobcats men's basketball team represented Ohio University in the college basketball season of 2008–09. The team was coached by John Groce in his first season and played their home games at the Convocation Center. They finished the season 15–17 and 7–9 in MAC play to finish last in the MAC East.

== Roster ==
2008–09 Ohio Bobcats men's basketball team
Players
Coaches

Pos.	#	Name	Height	Weight	Year	Hometown
F	11	Adetunji Adedipe	6 ft 5 in (1.96 m)	215 lb (98 kg)	So	Orange Village, Ohio
G	3	Michael Allen	6 ft 0 in (1.83 m)	180 lb (82 kg)	Sr	Detroit, Michigan
G	0	Armon Bassett	6 ft 1 in (1.85 m)	176 lb (80 kg)	Jr	Terre Haute, Indiana
G	2	Steven Coleman	6 ft 4 in (1.93 m)	200 lb (91 kg)	Fr	Melbourne, Florida
G	24	Tommy Freeman	6 ft 5 in (1.96 m)	180 lb (82 kg)	So	Muncie, Indiana
C	32	Zach Nagtzaam	6 ft 11.5 in (2.12 m)	255 lb (116 kg)	RS Fr	Ayr, Ontario
F	25	Justin Orr	6 ft 6 in (1.98 m)	205 lb (93 kg)	Sr	Cincinnati, Ohio
F	44	Asown Sayles	6 ft 5 in (1.96 m)	210 lb (95 kg)	Jr	McKeesport, Pennsylvania
F	33	Jerome Tillman	6 ft 6 in (1.98 m)	235 lb (107 kg)	Sr	Beavercreek, Ohio
C	12	Kenneth van Kempen	6 ft 10 in (2.08 m)	265 lb (120 kg)	Jr	Weert, Netherlands
F	1	DeVaughn Washington	6 ft 7 in (2.01 m)	215 lb (98 kg)	So	Virginia Beach, Virginia

Head coach

John Groce

Assistant coach(es)

Chris Holtmann
Jamall Walker
Dustin Ford

Legend

- (C) Team captain
- (S) Suspended
- (I) Ineligible
- (W) Walk-on
- Injured
- Current redshirt

== Coaching staff ==
Name	Position	College	Graduating year
John Groce	Head coach	Taylor University	1994
Chris Holtmann	Assistant coach	Taylor University	1994
Jamall Walker	Assistant coach	Saint Louis University	2000
Dustin Ford	Assistant coach	Ohio University	2001
Chris Cobbina	Graduate Manager	Ohio Valley University	2006
Daniel Leeworthy	Graduate Manager	BYU Hawaii	2006
Aaron Fuss	Administrative Assistant	Ohio State University	2005

== Preseason ==
The preseason poll was announced by the league office on October 30, 2008. Ohio was picked fifth in the MAC East

=== Preseason men's basketball poll ===
(First place votes in parentheses)

==== East Division ====
1. Kent State (16) 124
2. Miami (6) 109
3. Bowling Green 70
4. Akron 67
5. Ohio
6. Buffalo 35

==== West Division ====
1. Western Michigan (15) 122
2. Eastern Michigan (7) 105
3. Central Michigan 79
4. Toledo 71
5. Ball State 55
6. Northern Illinois 39

==== Tournament champs ====
Kent State (11), Miami (7), Bowling Green (2), Eastern Michigan (2)

=== Preseason All-MAC ===
Preseason All-MAC teams
Team	Player	Position	Year
Preseason All-MAC East	Jerome Tillman	F	Sr.

== Schedule ==
Date time, TV	Rank^{#}	Opponent^{#}	Result	Record	Site (attendance) city, state
Exhibition
11/1/08*; 2:00 pm		Wooster; Exhibition	W 79–65		Convocation Center (2,249); Athens, OH
11/9/08*; 2:00 pm		Mercyhurst; Exhibition	W 79–52		Convocation Center (2,413); Athens, OH
Regular Season
11/16/08*; 2:00 pm		William & Mary	W 74–55	1–0	Convocation Center (3,846); Athens, OH
11/22/08*; 7:00 pm		at Austin Peay	W 79–69	2–0	Dave Aaron Arena (3,317); Clarksville, TN
11/29/08*; 4:00 pm		at George Mason	L 65–74	2–1	Patriot Center (5,159); Fairfax, VA
12/3/08*; 7:00 pm		Tulsa	W 75–63	3–1	Convocation Center (4,833); Athens, OH
12/6/08*; 4:30 pm		vs. Lamar; Marques Maybin Classic	L 67–76	3–2	Freedom Hall (18,924); Louisville, KY
12/7/08*; 4:00 pm, ESPN Full Court		at No. 11 Louisville; Marques Maybin Classic	L 56–91	3–3	Freedom Hall (19,083); Louisville, KY
12/8/08*; 4:30 pm		vs. Indiana State; Marques Maybin Classic	W 62–50	4–3	Freedom Hall (19,058); Louisville, KY
12/10/08*; 7:30 pm, FSNO		at No. 10 Xavier	L 56–78	4–4	Cintas Center (10,043); Cincinnati, OH
12/13/08*; 2:00 pm		at Delaware	L 66–75	4–5	Bob Carpenter Center (2,652); Newark, DE
12/17/08*; 7:00 pm		at Marshall	L 68–73	4–6	Cam Henderson Center (5,019); Huntington, WV
12/22/08*; 7:00 pm		Holy Cross	W 58–53	5–6	Convocation Center (3,024); Athens, OH
12/30/08*; 7:00 pm		St. Francis (NY)	W 70–53	6–6	Convocation Center (2,928); Athens, OH
1/3/09*; 2:00 pm		Bucknell	W 85–67	7–6	Convocation Center (3,318); Athens, OH
MAC regular season
1/11/09; 2:00 pm		Kent State	W 71–65	8–6 (1–0)	Convocation Center (7,118); Athens, OH
1/14/09; 7:00 pm		at Miami (OH)	W 66–62	9–6 (2–0)	Millett Hall (2,385); Oxford, OH
1/17/09; 4:00 pm		at Buffalo	L 66–70	9–7 (2–1)	Alumni Arena (2,741); Buffalo, NY
1/20/09; 7:00 pm		Akron	W 70–65 ^{OT}	10–7 (3–1)	Convocation Center (4,208); Athens, OH
1/24/09; 2:30 pm		Bowling Green	L 51–52	10–8 (3–2)	Convocation Center (10,988); Athens, OH
1/29/09; 7:00 pm		at Central Michigan	L 69–76	10–9 (3–3)	Rose Arena (417); Mt. Pleasant, MI
1/31/09; 2:00 pm		at Ball State	L 44–51	10–10 (3–4)	Worthen Arena (3,524); Muncie, IN
2/5/09; 7:00 pm		Northern Illinois	W 89–59	11–10 (4–4)	Convocation Center (3,016); Athens, OH
2/7/09; 5:00 pm		Eastern Michigan	W 57–45	12–10 (5–4)	Convocation Center (5,735); Athens, OH
2/11/09; 7:00 pm		at Western Michigan	L 62–76	12–11 (5–5)	University Arena (2,758); Kalamazoo, MI
2/14/09; 7:00 pm		Toledo	W 91–58	13–11 (6–5)	Convocation Center (4,298); Athens, OH
2/17/09; 7:30 pm, FSNO		at Kent State	L 51–64	13–12 (6–6)	MAC Center (2,987); Kent, OH
2/21/09*; 7:00 pm		at Eastern Kentucky	L 51–73	13–13 (6–6)	McBrayer Arena (2,700); Richmond, KY
2/26/09; 7:00 pm		Miami (OH)	W 75–56	14–13 (7–6)	Convocation Center (7,231); Athens, OH
3/1/09; 12:00 pm, ESPNU		Buffalo	L 66–68	14–14 (7–7)	Convocation Center (4,669); Athens, OH
3/5/09; 7:00 pm		at Akron	L 51–60	14–15 (7–8)	Rhodes Arena (3,370); Akron, OH
3/8/09; 2:00 pm, BCSN		at Bowling Green	L 41–75	14–16 (7–9)	Anderson Arena (2,296); Bowling Green, OH
MAC tournament
3/10/09; 4:00 pm		vs. Western Michigan; First Round	W 62–55	15–16	Quicken Loans Arena (5,637); Cleveland, OH
3/12/09; 7:00 pm		vs. Bowling Green; Quarterfinals	L 61–74	15–17	Quicken Loans Arena (6,407); Cleveland, OH
*Non-Conference Game. ^{#}Rankings from AP Poll. All times are in Eastern Time Zone.

== Statistics ==
=== Team statistics ===
Final 2008–09 statistics

Record	Ohio	OPP
Scoring	2075	2080
Scoring Average	64.84	65.00
Field goals – Att	709–1634	714–1620
3-pt. Field goals – Att	208–573	212–628
Free throws – Att	449–639	–
Rebounds	990	1060
Assists	436	
Turnovers	459	483
Steals	222	
Blocked Shots	59	

=== Player statistics ===
			Minutes		Scoring		Total FGs			3-point FGs			Free-Throws			Rebounds								
Player	GP	GS	Tot	Avg	Pts	Avg	FG	FGA	Pct	3FG	3FA	Pct	FT	FTA	Pct	Off	Def	Tot	Avg	A	PF	TO	Stl	Blk
Jerome Tillman	32	32	1047	32.7	566	17.7	183	361	0.507	27	82	0.329	173	235	0.736	84	174	258	8.1	38	93	74	35	16
Justin Orr	32	23	900	28.1	327	10.2	121	304	0.398	55	150	0.367	30	40	0.75	31	85	116	3.6	49	63	49	26	10
Steven Coleman	32	17	858	26.8	313	9.8	112	238	0.471	37	107	0.346	52	79	0.658	30	73	103	3.2	80	79	84	53	6
Tommy Freeman	32	24	845	26.4	238	7.4	69	168	0.411	54	127	0.425	46	57	0.807	14	48	62	1.9	41	79	33	12	3
Michael Allen	32	32	961	30	221	6.9	69	193	0.358	25	69	0.362	58	82	0.707	10	57	67	2.1	138	82	61	46	1
DeVaughn Washington	32	15	722	22.6	215	6.7	83	178	0.466	0	0	0	49	75	0.653	43	99	142	4.4	19	103	67	26	13
Kenneth van Kempen	32	14	495	15.5	103	3.2	43	105	0.41	0	1	0	17	25	0.68	19	58	77	2.4	19	82	47	8	9
Frankie Dobbs	32	0	434	13.6	60	1.9	16	54	0.296	6	22	0.273	22	34	0.647	5	33	38	1.2	49	31	30	13	1
Stacey Waters	14	0	43	3.1	18	1.3	6	21	0.286	4	14	0.286	2	3	0.667	0	0	4	0.3	1	3	4	0	0
Adetunji Adedipe	24	3	101	4.2	12	0.5	6	10	0.6	0	0	0	0	9	0	11	16	27	1.1	2	28	5	1	0
Zach Nagtzaam	10	0	19	1.9	2	0.2	1	2	0.5	0	1	0	0	0	0	0	0	2	0.2	0	2	2	2	0
Total	32	-	6425	-	2075	64.8	709	1634	0.434	208	573	0.363	449	639	0.703	297	693	990	30.9	436	645	459	222	59
Opponents	32	-	6425	-	2080	65.0	714	1620	0.441	212	628	0.338			-			1060	33.1			483		

Legend
GP	Games played	GS	Games started	Avg	Average per game
FG	Field-goals made	FGA	Field-goal attempts	Off	Offensive rebounds
Def	Defensive rebounds	A	Assists	TO	Turnovers
Blk	Blocks	Stl	Steals	High	Team high

== Awards and honors ==
=== All-MAC Awards ===
Postseason All-MAC teams
Team	Player	Position	Year
All-MAC First team	Jerome Tillman	F	Sr.
All-MAC Honorable Mention	Mike Allen	G	Sr.
