= South Christian High School =

Location
- 7979 Kalamazoo Avenue SE; Byron Center, Michigan 49315; United States; 42°49′9″N 85°37′40″W

Information
- Type: Private Christian
- Motto: Anchored in God's Word
- Established: 1954
- Head of school: Aaron Meckes
- Teaching staff: 50+
- Grades: 9-12 Freshman-Senior
- Enrollment: 690
- Colors: Navy Blue and White/Silver
- Nickname: Sailors
- Website: www.schs.org

South Christian High School (SCHS) is a private Christian high school in Byron Center, Michigan. It offers classes from the 9th through 12th grade. SCHS is affiliated with Moline Christian School, Byron Center Christian School, Dutton Christian School, Legacy Christian School, all of which provide K-8 Education. They currently compete in the OK Gold Conference in sports.

== Academics ==
South Christian High School provides Advanced Placement courses in math, physics, social studies, and English.

== Notable alumni ==
- Ben Cook, golfer, made cut at 2021 PGA Championship
- Brian Diemer, Retired Track & Field athlete, Olympic Bronze Medalist
- Ben Handlogten, Retired professional basketball player
- David Kool, Retired basketball player and former Michigan Mr. Basketball
- Brian Mast, American politician
- Matt Steigenga, Retired professional basketball player, NBA Champion with the Chicago Bulls
