= David Kool =

American basketball player and coach

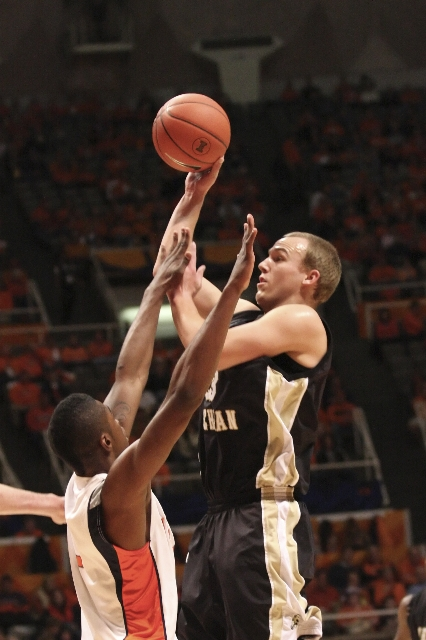
- Kool vs University of Illinois in 2009

Personal information
- Born: September 23, 1987 (age 39) Battle Creek, Michigan, U.S.
- Listed height: 6 ft 3 in (1.91 m)
- Listed weight: 200 lb (91 kg)

Career information
- High school: South Christian (Grand Rapids, Michigan)
- College: Western Michigan (2006–2010)
- NBA draft: 2010: undrafted
- Position: Guard
- Number: 23
- Coaching career: 2011–present

Career history

Coaching
- 2011–2013: Western Michigan (assistant)
- 2013–2016: Jenison HS
- 2017–2020: Holland Christian HS

Career highlights
- AP Honorable Mention All-American (2010); Third-team Academic All-American (2009); MAC Player of the Year (2010); 2× First-team All-MAC (2008, 2010); Second-team All-MAC (2009); MAC Freshman of the Year (2007); MAC All-Freshman team (2007); Mr. Basketball of Michigan (2006)

David Anderson Kool (born September 23, 1987) is a former collegiate basketball player for the Western Michigan Broncos men's basketball team. Kool is WMU's all-time leading scorer and was named Mid-American Conference (MAC) Player of the Year in his senior season. Kool was the boys' basketball coach at Jenison High School in Jenison, Michigan and at Holland Christian High School, in Holland, Michigan. Kool previously served as assistant coach for the WMU men's basketball team from 2011–13. Kool was named athletic director at South Christian High School on April 15, 2020.

== High school ==
Born in Battle Creek, Michigan, Kool is a graduate of South Christian High School in Grand Rapids where he was a four-year letter winner in basketball, compiling a 71–7 record and winning the 2006 Mr. Basketball of Michigan award. He helped lead South Christian to Class B basketball state championships in 2003 and 2005 as a freshman and junior. Kool scored a Class B-record 43 points in the 2005 state championship game, 18 of which came in the fourth quarter. He also broke the Class B state finals record by making all 20 of his free throw attempts in that game.

During his senior season, Kool was awarded the Basketball Coaches Association of Michigan First Team All-State, Associated Press First Team All-State, Detroit News and Detroit Free Press First Team All-State, Bankhoops.com State Player of the Year and High School Athlete of the Year honors by the March of Dimes.

Kool is South Christian High School all-time leading scorer with 1,853 points. He averaged 23.5 point per game for his career and 30.1 points, 6.3 rebounds, 3.5 assists and 2.4 steals per game his senior season.

Kool also played soccer, track and was the football placekicker in high school. Kool was named Second Team All-State in soccer his sophomore season.

Kool played AAU basketball on the Michigan Mustangs with several other college and NBA players such as Al Horford and Drew Neitzel.

== College ==
Kool played college basketball for the Broncos of Western Michigan University, wearing number 23. Kool sat out the first few games of the Bronco's 2006–07 campaign due to a leg injury, but became the Bronco's starting guard, playing both point guard and shooting guard. Kool was the Mid-American Conference's leading freshman scorer, averaging 11.4 points per game, and was fifth nationally in free throw percentage (91.7%). At the conclusion of the regular season, Kool was named the MAC's Freshman of the Year.

Kool holds the MAC all-time single season free throw percentage, shooting 99 for 108 (91.7%) in the 2006–07 season. He is also the only MAC player ever to finish the season with a free throw percentage greater than 90%. Kool made 29 consecutive free throws his freshman year, which is the second-longest streak in WMU history.

Kool scored a career-high 38 points against Kent State January 30, 2010 in a 74–73 loss at Kent State. Kool has been named MAC West Division Player of the Week on seven occasions, once his freshman year, three times his sophomore year and three times his junior year. Kool was named to the All-MAC First Team as a sophomore.

After the 2008–09 season Kool was named to the All-MAC Second Team and the Academic All-American Third Team.

Kool was named to the Preseason All-MAC team his junior and senior seasons.

On January 27, 2010, Kool scored 30 points to become WMU's all-time leading scorer, passing Manny Newsome (1,787 points). Kool finished his college career with 2,122 points.

Kool has made the most free throws in MAC history.

=== Statistics ===
The following table shows Kool's collegiate stats at WMU.

Year	Team	GP	GS	MPG	FGM	FGA	FG%	3PM	3PA	3P%	FTM	FTA	FT%	REB	RPG	AST	APG	STL	BLK	PTS	PPG
2006–07	Western Michigan	29	23	26.1	96	220	.436	39	93	.419	99	108	.917	86	3.0	48	1.7	34	0	330	11.4
2007–08	Western Michigan	32	31	32.2	158	378	.418	71	189	.376	136	159	.855	103	3.2	75	2.3	27	2	523	16.3
2008–09	Western Michigan	31	30	34.1	168	429	.392	58	195	.297	161	180	.894	127	4.1	62	2.0	44	0	555	17.9
2009–10	Western Michigan	33	33	35.0	221	492	.449	63	176	.358	209	233	.897	135	4.1	58	1.8	58	0	714	21.6
Career		125	117	32.0	643	1,519	.423	231	653	.354	605	680	.890	451	3.6	272	2.2	163	2	2,122	17.0

== Professional career ==
Kool was invited to the 2010 Portsmouth Invitational, an event that invites 64 of the best senior college players to participate in a four-day tournament.

== Coaching career ==
After the completion of his career at WMU, Kool returned to coach the WMU men's basketball team as an undergraduate assistant. Starting in the 2011–12 season, Kool served as an assistant coach for the team under head coach Steve Hawkins. After the end of the 2012–13 WMU season, Kool accepted the boys' varsity head coaching position at Jenison High School in Jenison, Michigan.

== See also ==
- 2009 NCAA Men's Basketball All-Americans
- Western Michigan Broncos men's basketball
- 2007–08 Western Michigan Broncos men's basketball team
- 2008–09 Western Michigan Broncos men's basketball team
- 2009–10 Western Michigan Broncos men's basketball team

Preceded by Wilson Chandler	Mr. Basketball of Michigan; 2006	Succeeded by Manny Harris
