= Jake Anderson (basketball) =

American basketball player (born 1987)

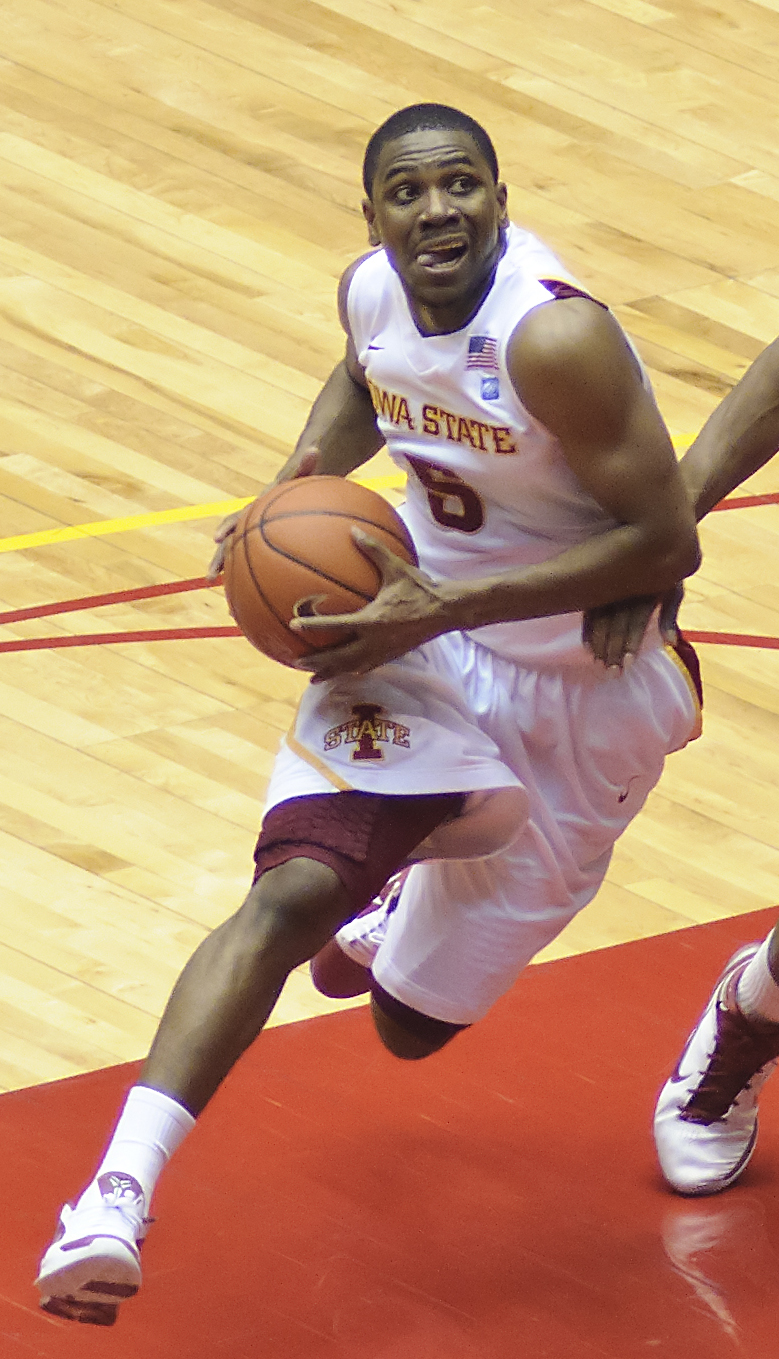
- Anderson playing for Iowa State in 2011

Personal information
- Born: April 8, 1987 (age 39) Chicago, Illinois, U.S.
- Listed height: 6 ft 2 in (1.88 m)
- Listed weight: 200 lb (91 kg)

Career information
- High school: Carver Military Academy (Chicago, Illinois)
- College: Northern Illinois (2007–2010); Iowa State (2010–2011)
- NBA draft: 2011: undrafted
- Playing career: 2011–2017
- Position: Point guard

Career history
- 2011–2012: Iowa Energy
- 2012: Sioux Falls Skyforce
- 2012: Ehingen Urspring
- 2015: Gateway Steam
- 2016–2017: Pontiac 66ers
- 2017: Orangeville A's

Career highlights
- Second-team All-MAC (2009); MAC Freshman of the Year (2008); MAC All-Freshman Team (2008)
- Stats at Basketball Reference

Darion "Jake" Anderson (born April 8, 1987) is an American former professional basketball player for the Orangeville A's of the National Basketball League of Canada (NBL). He played college basketball for Northern Illinois and Iowa State.

== High school career ==
Anderson went to Carver Military Academy where he averaged a Chicago Public League-best 32 points, seven assists and six rebounds for the Challengers as a senior.

== College career ==
Anderson began his NCAA career at Northern Illinois, where he was the 2007–08 Mid-American Conference Freshman of the Year. A three-year starter at NIU, Anderson averaged 13.2 PPG and 5.5 RPG from 2007 to 2010. He decided to enter his name in the 2009 NBA draft but did not hire an agent, so he retained his right to return to school the next season.

After completing his degree in communications in 2010, Anderson transferred to Iowa State for his final season of eligibility, where he was enrolled in graduate classes in Hospitality Management. Anderson had an outstanding senior season in Ames, starting 31 games and averaging 12.8 PPG, and leading the team with 7.2 rebounds per game. In Anderson's final collegiate game, he scored a career-high 33 points vs. Colorado in the Big 12 Conference Tournament.

== Professional career ==
On November 3, 2011, Anderson was selected by the Dakota Wizards in the fourth round of the 2011 NBA Development League Draft. The next day, his rights were trade to the Iowa Energy, going on to join the team for the 2011–12 season. On December 29, 2011, he was waived by the Energy due to injury, later being waived outright on January 2, 2012; he managed just 13 appearances for the Energy. On January 17, 2012, he was acquired by the Sioux Falls Skyforce, but was waived a month later after appearing in nine games. In 22 total D-League games in 2011–12, Anderson averaged 9.0 points, 2.6 rebounds and 2.8 assists per game.

In July 2012, Anderson joined the Chicago Bulls for the 2012 NBA Summer League where he appeared in just one game. Anderson later signed with Ehingen Urspring of Germany for the 2012–13 season. However, his stint ended in December 2012 after appearing in 15 games for the club and averaging 12.5 points, 3.4 rebounds and 2.0 assists per game.

Anderson's next playing stint came over two years later, as he joined the Gateway Steam for the inaugural season of the Midwest Professional Basketball Association. In 21 games for the Steam in 2015, Anderson averaged 16.9 points and 5.7 rebounds per game.

On September 28, 2015, Anderson signed with the Chicago Bulls. However, he was later waived by the Bulls on October 13 after appearing in one preseason game. On December 15, he returned to the MPBA, joining the newly formed Pontiac 66ers for training camp. He made his debut for Pontiac on January 10, 2016, in a 138–128 win over his former team, the Gateway Steam, leading his team with 34 points.

On January 8, 2017, Anderson signed with the Orangeville A's of the NBL Canada.
