= Nate Miller (basketball) =

American basketball player (1987–2022)

Personal information
- Born: August 12, 1987 Springfield, Ohio, U.S.
- Died: June 4, 2022 (aged 34)
- Listed height: 6 ft 4 in (1.93 m)
- Listed weight: 224 lb (102 kg)

Career information
- High school: South (Springfield, Ohio)
- College: UNC Wilmington (2005–2006); Bowling Green (2006–2009)
- NBA draft: 2009: undrafted
- Playing career: 2009–2019
- Position: Guard

Career history
- 2011–2012: Maccabi Be'er Ya'akov
- 2012: Panteras de Aguascalientes
- 2013–2015: Ironi Nahariya
- 2015–2016: Ironi Ramat Gan
- 2016–2017: Ulsan Mobis Phoebus
- 2017–2018: Incheon ET Land Elephants
- 2018–2019: Seoul Samsung Thunders

Career highlights
- South Korean League Defensive Player of the Year (2017); First-team All-MAC (2009)

Nathan Lamar Miller Jr. (August 12, 1987 – June 4, 2022) was an American professional basketball player. He played college basketball for the UNC Wilmington Seahawks and Bowling Green Falcons. Miller played professionally in Spain, Israel, Mexico and Argentina before he finished his career in South Korea following the 2018–19 season.

Miller returned to his hometown of Springfield, Ohio, after his playing career and ran an organization called MillerzElite Basketball that hosted basketball camps for children. He died on June 4, 2022, due to "acute exacerbation of asthma" at the age of 34.
