= Nate Linhart =

American basketball player

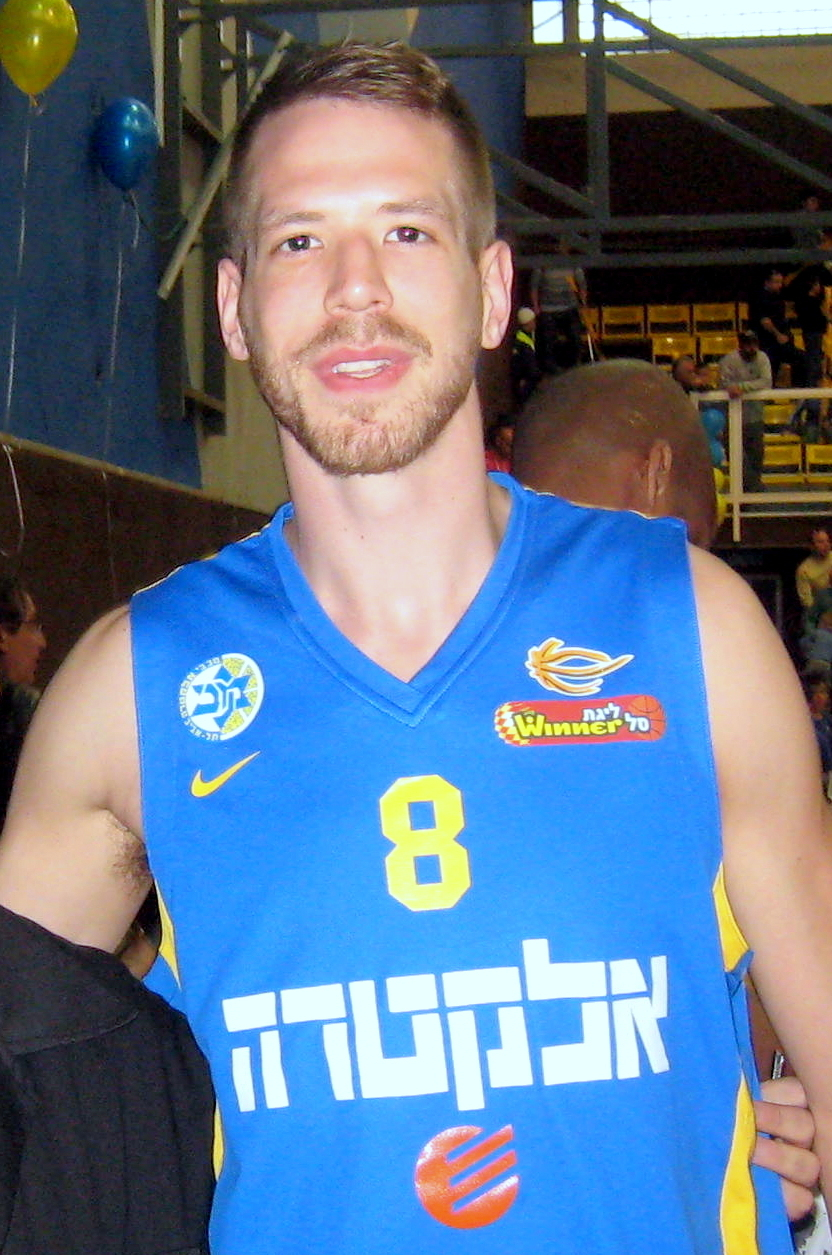
- Linhart with Maccabi Tel Aviv in March 2015

Personal information
- Born: November 14, 1986 (age 40) Gahanna, Ohio, U.S.
- Listed height: 6 ft 7 in (2.01 m)
- Listed weight: 215 lb (98 kg)

Career information
- High school: Lincoln (Gahanna, Ohio)
- College: Akron (2005–2009)
- NBA draft: 2009: undrafted
- Playing career: 2009–2020
- Position: Small forward

Career history
- 2009–2010: Raiffeisen Panthers Fürstenfeld
- 2010–2011: Erie BayHawks
- 2011–2013: TBB Trier
- 2013–2014: Reyer Venezia
- 2014–2015: Maccabi Tel Aviv
- 2015–2016: CAI Zaragoza
- 2016–2018: Medi Bayreuth
- 2018–2019: Spirou
- 2019: Telekom Baskets Bonn
- 2019–2020: Medi Bayreuth

Career highlights
- BBL All-Star (2018); MAC tournament MVP (2009)

Nathaniel Andrew Linhart (born November 14, 1986) is an American former professional basketball player. He played college basketball for the University of Akron before playing professionally in Austria, Germany, Italy, Israel, Spain and Belgium.

== College career ==
After playing high school basketball at Lincoln, in Gahanna, Ohio, Linhart played 4 seasons of college basketball at the University of Akron, with the Akron Zips.

== Professional career ==
Linhart went undrafted in the 2009 NBA draft. For the 2009–10 season he signed with BSC Raiffeisen Panthers Fürstenfeld of Austria.

For the 2010–11 season he signed with Erie BayHawks of the NBA D-League. From 2011 to 2013 he played with TBB Trier of the German Basketball Bundesliga. In July 2013, he signed with Reyer Venezia Mestre of the Italian Lega Basket Serie A.

In August 2014, Linhart signed a three-year deal with the Israeli powerhouse Maccabi Tel Aviv. He also competed in the EuroLeague with Maccabi, averaging 5.8 points per contest. On July 4, 2015, he left Maccabi and signed a one-year deal with CAI Zaragoza of Spain.

On July 4, 2016, Linhart signed with Medi Bayreuth for the 2016–17 season.

On July 31, 2018, Linhart was announced by Spirou Basket of the Belgian Pro Basketball League (PBL). In early February 2019, he moved back to Germany, signing with the Telekom Baskets Bonn.

On August 29, 2019, Linhart signed with Hapoel Be'er Sheva of the Israeli Premier League. On October 6, 2019, he parted ways with Be'er Sheva after appearing in one pre-season tournament game.

On October 20, 2019, Linhart returned to Medi Bayreuth for a second stint, signing for the 2019–20 season.

== Career statistics ==
Legend
GP	Games played	GS	Games started	MPG	Minutes per game
FG%	Field-goal percentage	3P%	3-point field-goal percentage	FT%	Free-throw percentage
RPG	Rebounds per game	APG	Assists per game	SPG	Steals per game
BPG	Blocks per game	PPG	Points per game	PIR	Performance index rating
**Bold**	Career high

=== Euroleague ===
Year	Team	GP	GS	MPG	FG%	3P%	FT%	RPG	APG	SPG	BPG	PPG	PIR
2014–15	Maccabi	20	2	15.7	.524	.432	.533	2.8	1.1	.9	.3	5.8	6.5
Career		20	2	15.7	.524	.432	.533	2.8	1.1	.9	.3	5.8	6.5
