= 2008–09 Big Ten Conference men's basketball season =

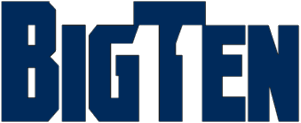
- League: NCAA Division I
- Sport: Basketball
- Duration: December 30, 2008 through March 8, 2009
- Teams: 11
- Total attendance: 2,348,136
- Average attendance: 12,519
- TV partner(s): Big Ten Network, ESPN, CBS

2008–09 NCAA Division I season
- Champion: Michigan State (15–3)
- Runners-Up: Illinois (11–7); Purdue (11–7)
- Season MVP: Kalin Lucas - MSU
- Top scorer: Evan Turner - OSU

Tournament
- Venue: Conseco Fieldhouse, Indianapolis, Indiana
- Champions: Purdue
- Runners-up: Ohio State
- Finals MVP: Robbie Hummel - PUR

Basketball seasons
- 2007–08 2009–10

2008–09 Big Ten Conference men's basketball standings
	Conf.				Overall
Team	W		L	PCT	W		L	PCT
No. 8 Michigan State	15	–	3	.833	31	–	7	.816
No. 17 Purdue†	11	–	7	.611	27	–	10	.730
Illinois	11	–	7	.611	24	–	10	.706
Penn State	10	–	8	.556	27	–	11	.711
Ohio State	10	–	8	.556	22	–	11	.667
Wisconsin	10	–	8	.556	20	–	13	.606
Minnesota	9	–	9	.500	22	–	11	.667
Michigan	9	–	9	.500	21	–	14	.600
Northwestern	8	–	10	.444	17	–	14	.548
Iowa	5	–	13	.278	15	–	17	.469
Indiana	1	–	17	.056	6	–	25	.194
† 2009 Big Ten tournament winner Rankings from AP poll

The 2008–09 Big Ten Conference men's basketball season marked the continuation of the annual tradition of competitive basketball among Big Ten Conference members that began in 1904. It was the 104th season of Big Ten Conference basketball play. Although during the 2008-09 NCAA Division I men's basketball season there were no Big Ten players named to any All-American teams, no coaches given any national coaching honors, and no teams that won any major preconference tournament, the season was successful for other reasons. The conference had an overall 14–8 record in postseason play with one team reaching for the 2009 NCAA Men's Division I Basketball Tournament championship game and another winning the championship of the 2009 National Invitation Tournament (NIT).

The season marked the second year that all regular season and Big Ten Conference men's basketball tournament games were nationally televised. It was the first season that eight member teams achieved 20 wins. During the season, the conference achieved a .781 winning percentage against non-conference opponents, which is the highest percentage since 1998–99.

Michigan State was the regular season champion winning the league four games. Purdue and Illinois tied for second place. Michigan State's Kalin Lucas was named Big Ten Player of the Year. Michigan State's Tom Izzo was named Coach of the Year by the coaches while Penn State's Ed Dechellis was named Coach of the Year by the media.

Purdue won the Big Ten tournament by defeating Ohio State in the championship. As a result of its win, Purdue received the conference's automatic bid to the NCAA tournament. In total, seven teams received bids to the NCAA tournament: Michigan State, Purdue, Illinois, Ohio State, Michigan, Minnesota, and Wisconsin. By placing 7 of its 11 teams in the tournament, it had 64% of its teams in the tournament, which outpaced all other conferences. Both Michigan State and Purdue advanced to the second weekend's Sweet Sixteen round, where Purdue lost to Connecticut. Michigan State advanced to the championship game where it lost to North Carolina 89–72.

The Big Ten also had two entrants in the 2009 NIT: Penn State and Northwestern with Penn State winning the tournament.

== Preseason ==
=== All-Big Ten players ===
On October 26, the Big Ten media selected Purdue as the preseason top team. It selected Michigan State and Wisconsin as second and third respectively. However, the November 10 national AP Poll and Coaches' Poll ranked Michigan State as the highest among Big Ten teams with Purdue second and Wisconsin third in their respective preseason 2008–09 NCAA Division I men's basketball rankings.

The media also made preseason All-Big Ten player selections: Manny Harris, sophomore guard from Michigan, Raymar Morgan, junior forward from Michigan State, Marcus Landry, senior forward from Wisconsin, E'Twaun Moore, sophomore guard from Purdue, and Robbie Hummel, sophomore forward from Purdue, who was named Preseason Player of the Year.

The Los Angeles Athletic Club released its annual preseason John R. Wooden Award watch list on November 13. The list was composed of 50 student athletes who, based on 2007–08's individual performance and team records, were the early frontrunners for college basketball's most coveted trophy. These top 50 candidates were returning players. Transfers, freshmen, and medical red-shirts were not eligible for this preseason list, but were evaluated and considered for both the Midseason Top 30 list and the National Ballot. The Big Ten was represented by Purdue's Hummel, Wisconsin's Landry and Michigan State's Morgan.

On December 18, the Atlanta Tipoff Club released its annual early season Naismith College Player of the Year award watch list. The top-50 list included Hummel, Moore and Morgan. The watch list does not include incoming freshmen, although those student-athletes were considered in the February 2009 mid season vote.

== Regular season ==
November

The Big Ten began the season anticipating competitive schedules since the conference had scheduled appearances against thirteen of the teams appearing in both of the major pre-season rankings. The conference opened its first week with a 14–0 record, while holding all 14 opponents to 65 points or less. By the end of the second week of the season the Big Ten found itself with the best non-conference record in the nation at 35–1. They became the first power conference (ACC, Big 12, Big East, Big Ten, Pac-10 or SEC) to have a road win against another of the conferences when Illinois bested Vanderbilt on November 20. On the same date, Michigan achieved the conference's first victory against a top five opponent since Michigan State upended Texas on December 22, 2007. Big Ten teams did not win any of the larger preconference tournaments: Purdue lost in overtime of the November 28 championship game of the 16-team 2008 NIT Season Tip-Off tournament, Michigan placed second in the 16-team 2K Sports Classic benefiting Coaches vs. Cancer tournament on November 21, and Wisconsin was runner up in the 8-team Paradise Jam Tournament on November 24. Minnesota, was successful in the 4-team National Association of Basketball Coaches Classic with a win over Georgia State Panthers in the championship game.

December

On Wednesday, December 3, The Big Ten lost to the Atlantic Coast Conference for the 10th consecutive year in the ACC–Big Ten Challenge. The final margin was 6–5. By the end of the fourth week of the season in early December, the Big Ten had the highest percentage of teams receiving votes in the Associated Press National Rankings and had the highest non-conference strength of schedule in the Ratings Percentage Index (RPI). Minnesota's 8–0 start was Tubby Smith's first. After five weeks, the Big Ten had the maintained its AP rankings leadership, but also took over the overall leadership in the RPI ratings. The conference's 82–19 record included only losses to teams that had advanced to the post-season the year before. Michigan State's win against Texas gave the Big Ten half of the nation's first six victories over top five teams. National Invitation Tournament defending champion, Ohio State's eighth victory gave them the nation's longest win streak at thirteen. Entering conference play, at 12–0 Minnesota remained one of the nine unbeaten teams in the nation, which was its best start since 1948–49. The conference had one of three winning conference records on the road against non-conference opponents at 10–8 and with 5 of its 11 teams ranked in the AP poll, it had the highest percentage of its teams ranked.

January

For the first time since freshmen became eligible in 1974, Indiana started four freshmen in a conference opener on January 3 against Iowa. On January 11, Minnesota tied an NCAA record and set a conference record by making all nine of its three-point field goals. Illinois' January 14 victory over Michigan made it the thirteenth team in NCAA Division I history and second (after Indiana) in the Big Ten to achieve 1600 wins. On January 21, Northwestern snapped the third-longest home-court winning streak in the nation when it stopped Michigan State from earning its 29th straight home victory. John Beilein recorded his 500th win as head coach of a four-year school and 575th win overall on January 24 against Northwestern. As January ended, the conference enjoyed its fourth consecutive week as the leader in the RPI strength of schedule. On January 31, Matt Roth became the first Indiana Hoosier, first Big Ten freshman and third Big Ten player to record nine three-point shots in a single game.

February

At the midpoint of the conference schedule at the beginning of February, the Big Ten had the highest Sagarin Rating central mean score. Previously, Michigan State had never won its first five conference road games since joining the Big Ten for the 1950–51 season, but during the season, they were one of the last two teams to be undefeated on the road at 7–0. Tubby Smith became the third coach in NCAA history to record 20 wins during 16 consecutive seasons. Through its 166th contest, the Big Ten, which had led the nation in average attendance for the prior 32 years, surpassed two million in attendance for the sixteenth consecutive season and eighteenth overall.

=== Attendance ===
The big ten concluded the season with the highest attendance in the nation for the 33rd straight season with an average attendance of 12,519 fans per game/session, including regular-season games and conference tournament sessions. This surpassed the SEC, which was second with an 11,625 average. The Big Ten held seven of the top 25 places among individual institutions, while no other conference had more than four individual schools among the top 25.

=== Rankings ===
AP Poll	Pre	Wk 1	Wk 2	Wk 3	Wk 4	Wk 5	Wk 6	Wk 7	Wk 8	Wk 9	Wk 10	Wk 11	Wk 12	Wk 13	Wk 14	Wk 15	Wk 16	Wk 17	Wk 18	Final^
Illinois			RV	RV	RV	RV	RV	RV	RV	RV	25	19	23	22	18	20	23	RV	RV	RV
Indiana																				
Iowa																				
Michigan			RV	RV	RV	RV	24	22	RV	25	RV									RV
Michigan State	6	5	5	13	18	19	11	10	8	7	7	9	13	9	6	9	8	6	8	2
Minnesota					RV	RV	23	21	22	18	21	RV	19	RV	RV	RV				
Northwestern					RV	RV														
Ohio State	RV	RV	RV	RV	21	17	15	24	RV		RV	RV	RV	24	RV			RV	RV	RV
Penn State													RV			RV		RV		RV
Purdue	11	11	10	9	14	13	10	9	14	19	18	16	12	20	19	16	19	24	17	14
Wisconsin	25	25	25	RV	RV	RV	RV		RV	RV	RV				RV					

^Final Poll = ESPN/USA Today Coaches Poll

=== Preconference schedules ===
==== Tournaments ====
No Big Ten teams won any major early conference tournaments.

==== ACC–Big Ten Challenge ====
Date	Time	ACC team	Big Ten team	Location	Television	Attendance	Winner	Challenge leader
Mon., Dec 1	7:00PM	Virginia Tech	#22 Wisconsin	Cassell Coliseum • Blacksburg, VA	ESPN2	9,847	Wisconsin (74–72)	BigTen (1–0)
Tue., Dec 2	7:00PM	Boston College	Iowa	Conte Forum • Chestnut Hill, MA	ESPNU	4,084	Boston College (57–55)	Tied (1-1)
Tue., Dec 2	7:00PM	#22 Miami (FL)	Ohio State	BankUnited Center • Coral Gables, FL	ESPN	5,870	Ohio State (73–68)	BigTen (2–1)
Tue., Dec 2	7:30PM	Clemson	Illinois	Assembly Hall • Champaign, IL	ESPN2	14,741	Clemson (76–74)	Tied (2-2)
Tue., Dec 2	9:00PM	#4 Duke	#10 Purdue	Mackey Arena • West Lafayette, IN	ESPN	14,123	Duke (76–60)	ACC (3–2)
Tue., Dec 2	9:30PM	Virginia	Minnesota	Williams Arena • Minneapolis, MN	ESPN2	12,424	Minnesota (66–56)	Tied (3-3)
Wed., Dec 3	7:15PM	#17 Wake Forest	Indiana	LJVM Coliseum • Winston-Salem, NC	ESPN	12,445	Wake Forest (83–58)	ACC (4–3)
Wed., Dec 3	7:30PM	Maryland	Michigan	Comcast Center • College Park, MD	ESPNU	17,950	Maryland (75–70)	ACC (5–3)
Wed., Dec 3	7:30PM	Georgia Tech	Penn State	Alexander Memorial Coliseum • Atlanta, GA	ESPN2	7,900	Penn State (85–83)	ACC (5–4)
Wed., Dec 3	9:15PM	#1 North Carolina	#12 Michigan State	Ford Field • Detroit, MI (Basketbowl II)	ESPN	25,267	North Carolina (98–63)	ACC (6–4)
Wed., Dec 3	9:30PM	Florida State	Northwestern	Welsh-Ryan Arena • Evanston, IL	ESPN2	3,537	Northwestern (73–59)	ACC (6–5)
Game Times in EST. Rankings from ESPN Coaches Poll (Dec. 1). North Carolina State did not play due to its last place finish in the ACC during the 2007–2008 season.

=== In-season honors ===
Players of the week

Throughout the conference regular season, the Big Ten offices named a player of the week each Monday.

Week	Player of the week
11/17/08	Manny Harris, MICH
11/24/08	Craig Moore, NU
11/24/08	Talor Battle, PSU
12/1/08	Mike Tisdale, ILL
12/1/08	E'Twaun Moore, PUR
12/8/08	Evan Turner, OSU
12/15/08	Robbie Hummel, PUR
12/22/08	Robbie Hummel, PUR
12/29/08	Trent Meacham, ILL
12/29/08	DeShawn Sims, MICH
1/5/09	Raymar Morgan, MSU
1/12/09	Kalin Lucas, MSU
1/19/09	William Buford, OSU
1/26/09	Kevin Coble, NU
1/26/09	Jamelle Cornley, PSU
2/2/09	Evan Turner, OSU
2/9/09	Evan Turner, OSU
2/16/09	Joe Krabbenhoft, WIS
2/16/09	Delvon Roe, MSU
2/23/09	Jake Kelly, IA
3/2/09	Michael Thompson, NU
3/9/09	Jake Kelly, IA

Midseason watch lists

On February 5, the Big Ten became one of six conferences to have multiple players selected as John R. Wooden Award 2008–09 Midseason Top 30 Candidates. Both Manny Harris and Kalin Lucas were chosen. On February 24, Hummel became the only Big Ten player included in the Naismith midseason Top 30. On February 26, Turner became the only Big Ten player selected by the U.S. Basketball Writers Association as a Top 15 finalist for the Oscar Robertson Trophy.

=== Conference honors ===
Two sets of conference award winners were recognized by the Big Ten - one selected by league coaches and one selected by the media.

Honor	Coaches	Media
Player of the Year	Kalin Lucas, MSU	Kalin Lucas, MSU
Coach of the Year	Tom Izzo, MSU	Ed Dechellis, PSU
Freshman of the Year	William Buford, OSU	William Buford, OSU
Defensive Player of the Year	Travis Walton, MSU	None Selected
Sixth Man of the Year	B. J. Mullens, OSU	None Selected
All Big Ten First Team	Manny Harris, MICH	Manny Harris, MICH
All Big Ten First Team	Kalin Lucas, MSU	Kalin Lucas, MSU
All Big Ten First Team	Evan Turner, OSU	Evan Turner, OSU
All Big Ten First Team	Talor Battle, PSU	Talor Battle, PSU
All Big Ten First Team	JaJuan Johnson, PUR	JaJuan Johnson, PUR
All Big Ten Second Team	Mike Davis, ILL	DeShawn Sims, MICH
All Big Ten Second Team	Goran Suton, MSU	Goran Suton, MSU
All Big Ten Second Team	Kevin Coble, NU	Kevin Coble, NU
All Big Ten Second Team	E'Twaun Moore, PUR	E'Twaun Moore, PUR
All Big Ten Second Team	Marcus Landry, WIS	Jamelle Cornley, PSU
All Big Ten Third Team	Demetri McCamey, ILL	Demetri McCamey, ILL
All Big Ten Third Team	DeShawn Sims, MICH	Mike Davis, ILL
All Big Ten Third Team	Craig Moore, NU	Craig Moore, NU
All Big Ten Third Team	Robbie Hummel, PUR	Robbie Hummel, PUR
All Big Ten Third Team	Jamelle Cornley, PSU	Marcus Landry, WIS
All Big Ten Honorable Mention	Mike Tisdale, ILL	Mike Tisdale, ILL
All Big Ten Honorable Mention	Jake Kelly, IA	Jake Kelly, IA
All Big Ten Honorable Mention	Raymar Morgan, MSU	Raymar Morgan, MSU
All Big Ten Honorable Mention	Lawrence Westbrook, MINN	Lawrence Westbrook, MINN
All Big Ten Honorable Mention	Jon Diebler, OSU	Jon Diebler, OSU
All Big Ten Honorable Mention	Stanley Pringle, PSU	Stanley Pringle, PSU
All Big Ten Honorable Mention	Trévon Hughes, WIS	Trévon Hughes, WIS
All Big Ten Honorable Mention	William Buford, OSU	Chester Frazier, ILL
All Big Ten Honorable Mention	—	Travis Walton, MSU
All Big Ten Honorable Mention	—	Chris Kramer, PUR
All Big Ten Honorable Mention	—	Joe Krabbenhoft, WIS
All-Freshman Team	Matt Gatens, IA	Not Selected
All-Freshman Team	Delvon Roe, MSU	Not Selected
All-Freshman Team	William Buford, OSU	Not Selected
All-Freshman Team	B.J. Mullens, OSU	Not Selected
All-Freshman Team	Lewis Jackson, PUR	Not Selected
All Defensive Team	Chester Frazier, ILL	Not Selected
All Defensive Team	Travis Walton, MSU	Not Selected
All Defensive Team	Damian Johnson, MINN	Not Selected
All Defensive Team	Chris Kramer, PUR	Not Selected
All Defensive Team	JaJuan Johnson, PUR	Not Selected

=== All-Big Ten Academic team ===
The Big Ten Conference had 40 men's basketball letterwinners who were in at least their second academic year at their institution and who maintained a cumulative grade point average (GPA) of 3.0 or higher during the winter semester to earn Big Ten Academic All-Conference honors. Northwestern's Sterling Williams who was a graduate student with a Communication Studies major had a perfect Winter GPA. These student-athletes were eligible to be named Distinguished Scholar Awardees if they maintained a 3.7 GPA for the entire academic year.

== National awards and honors ==
=== National awards ===
On March 22, the Big Ten had no players among the four finalists named for the Naismith award to be announced on April 5. On March 12, Lucas was among the 25 finalists for the Wooden Award to be named on April 10.

=== NABC ===
The National Association of Basketball Coaches announced their Division I All-District teams on March 5, recognizing the nation's best men's collegiate basketball student-athletes. Selected and voted on by member coaches of the NABC, 240 student-athletes, from 24 districts were chosen. The selection on this list were then eligible for the State Farm Coaches' Division I All-America teams announced at the 2009 NABC Convention in Detroit. The following list represented the Big Ten players chosen to the list. All Big Ten schools are within District 7 for the 2008–09 season.

First Team

- Kalin Lucas Michigan State
- Evan Turner Ohio State
- Talor Battle Penn. State
- Manny Harris Michigan
- JaJuan Johnson Purdue
Second Team
- Kevin Coble Northwestern
- Demetri McCamey Illinois
- Jamelle Cornley Penn. State
- Goran Suton Michigan State
- Mike Tisdale Illinois

=== USBWA ===
On March 10, the U.S. Basketball Writers Association released its 2008–09 Men's All-District Teams, based on voting from its national membership. There were nine regions from coast to coast and a player and coach of the year were selected in each. The following enumerates all the Big Ten players selected within their respective regions.

District II (NY, NJ, DE, DC, PA, WV)

All-District Team

- Talor Battle, Penn State
District V (OH, IN, IL, MI, MN, WI)

All-District Team

- Mike Davis, Illinois
- Manny Harris, Michigan
- JaJuan Johnson, Purdue
- Kalin Lucas, Michigan State
- Robbie Hummel, Purdue
- Evan Turner, Ohio State
District VI (IA, MO, KS, OK, NE, ND, SD)

None Selected

=== Academic honors ===
==== CoSIDA ====
On February 5, 2009, the College Sports Information Directors of America (CoSIDA) and ESPN the Magazine selected their Academic All-Americans from throughout college basketball. CoSIDA has selected Academic All American teams since 1952. To be nominated, a student-athlete must be a starter or important reserve with at least a 3.30 cumulative grade point average (on a 4.0 scale) at his/her current institution. Nominated athletes must have participated in at least 50 percent of the team's games at the position listed on the nomination form (where applicable). No student-athlete is eligible until he has completed one full calendar year at his current institution and has reached sophomore athletic eligibility. In the cases of transfers, graduate students and two-year college graduates, the student-athlete must have completed one full calendar year at the nominating institution to be eligible. Nominees in graduate school must have a cumulative GPA of 3.30 or better both as an undergrad and in grad school. Penn State's Danny Morrissey was a District 2 first-team 2009 Academic All-District Men's Basketball Team selection. On February 25, 2009, the Big Ten had no Academic All America Men's Basketball Team selections.

==== Big Ten Distinguished Scholar Award ====
At the conclusion of the 2008–09 academic year, the inaugural class of Big Ten Distinguished Scholars were recognized for having attained a 3.7 GPA for the academic year while earning varsity letters. Brett Finkelmeier, IND, Jamal Abu-Shamala, MINN, Sterling Williams, NU, and Mark Wohlford, PUR represented men's basketball as awardees.

=== All-American ===
Lucas and Turner were Associated Press All-American honorable mentions.

=== Summer play ===
Battle, Hummel, and Turner were selected to represent the United States in the 2009 World University Games July 2–11 in Belgrade, Serbia. John Shurna was named to the United States' team for the 2009 FIBA Under-19 World championship held July 2–12 in Auckland, New Zealand.

=== NBA draft ===
During the 2009 NBA draft, Mullens was chosen in the first round with the 24th overall selection by the Dallas Mavericks and Suton was selected by the Utah Jazz in the second round with the 50th overall selection.

=== Coaching honors ===
Wisconsin head basketball coach, Bo Ryan, was chosen to be the head coach for the 2009 World University Games Team by USA Basketball. Purdue head basketball coach, Matt Painter, was chosen to be one of two assistant coaches for the 2009 FIBA Under-19 World championship Team by USA Basketball. Painter was one of ten finalists for the 2009 Henry Iba Award as named by the U.S. Basketball Writers Association. Forbes named Ryan and Tom Izzo as two of the top ten coaches.

== Statistical leaders ==
Eight of the eleven member Big Ten institutions will return at least 75 percent of their offensive production during the 2009–10 Big Ten Conference men's basketball season, unless underclassmen declare for the 2009 NBA draft. Indiana, Iowa, Michigan, Minnesota and Ohio State will return 90 percent of their total offensive production. The Buckeyes could return 100 percent of their scoring contingent next season. All five first-team All-Conference honorees were sophomores and are all projected to return as juniors. Overall, the Big Ten could return 80.5 percent of its offensive production from 2008 to 2009, and no team should lose more than half of its total scoring unit next year.

Scoring
Name	School	PPG
Evan Turner	OSU	17.3
Manny Harris	MICH	16.9
Talor Battle	PSU	16.7
Kevin Coble	NU	15.5
DeShawn Sims	MICH	15.4

Rebounding
Name	School	RPG
Goran Suton	MSU	8.4
Mike Davis	ILL	8.1
Evan Turner	OSU	7.1
Robbie Hummel	PUR	7.0
DeShawn Sims	MICH	6.8

Assists
Name	School	APG
Chester Frazier (27)	ILL	5.3
Talor Battle (35)	PSU	5.0
Kalin Lucas	MSU	4.63
Demetri McCamey	ILL	4.59
Manny Harris	MICH	4.4

Steals
Name	School	SPG
Chris Kramer (37)	PUR	2.1
Al Nolen	MINN	1.94
Damian Johnson	MINN	1.93
Evan Turner	OSU	1.8
Trevon Hughes	WIS	1.5

Blocks
Name	School	BPG
JaJuan Johnson (38)	PUR	2.1
Dallas Lauderdale	OSU	2.03
Damian Johnson	MINN	2.00
Ralph Sampson III	MINN	1.5
Mike Tisdale	ILL	1.4

Field Goals
Name	School	FG%
JaJuan Johnson	PUR	.540
Mike Davis	ILL	.533
Jamelle Cornley	PSU	.518
DeShawn Sims	MICH	.505
Evan Turner	OSU	.503

Min. 5 FGM/Gm.

3-Pt Field Goals
Name	School	3FG%
Stanley Pringle (24)	PSU	.450
Trent Meacham	ILL	.421
Michael Thompson	NU	.417
Jon Diebler	OSU	.416
Craig Moore	NU	.406

Min 1.5 3Pt FGM/Gm.

Free Throws
Name	School	FT%
Manny Harris (26)	MICH	.863
Lawrence Westbrook	MINN	.833
Jeff Peterson	IA	.825
Kalin Lucas	MSU	.808
Evan Turner	OSU	.788

Min 2.5 FTM/Gm.

Players must have played in 75% of team's games to be eligible. (NCAA-wide ranking) in parentheses for top 40 performers

=== Team statistics ===
Team	GP	PTS	PPG	FGM	FGA	FG%	3PM	3PA	3PT%	FTM	FTA	FT%	OFF	DEF	TEAM	REB	RPG	ASST	APG	BLK	STL	TO	PF	DQ	Tch F
Michigan State	38	2737	72	962	2135	0.451	201	567	0.354	612	877	0.698	533	949	122	1604	42.2	611	16.1	107	248	532	733	9	2
Purdue	37	2555	69.1	914	2071	0.441	244	704	0.347	483	687	0.703	363	908	107	1378	37.2	552	14.9	176	266	426	650	8	0
Penn State	38	2545	67	904	2040	0.443	282	782	0.361	455	691	0.658	405	883	118	1406	37	494	13	64	192	412	551	9	3
Michigan	35	2341	66.9	812	1910	0.425	305	912	0.334	412	544	0.757	336	751	99	1186	33.9	542	15.5	92	223	402	533	5	3
Ohio State	33	2206	66.8	778	1618	0.481	216	576	0.375	434	619	0.701	266	758	83	1107	33.5	440	13.3	175	194	439	500	5	3
Minnesota	33	2189	66.3	782	1772	0.441	188	575	0.327	437	611	0.715	397	739	125	1261	38.2	466	14.1	201	274	477	588	8	1
Illinois	34	2204	64.8	859	1865	0.461	188	537	0.35	298	419	0.711	320	807	111	1238	36.4	595	17.5	122	199	420	521	9	2
Wisconsin	33	2106	63.8	735	1686	0.436	213	592	0.36	423	583	0.726	317	703	85	1105	33.5	393	11.9	86	163	330	529	8	4
Northwestern	31	1967	63.5	697	1568	0.445	255	661	0.386	318	461	0.69	266	611	124	1001	32.3	472	15.2	89	225	346	554	11	4
Iowa	32	1927	60.2	650	1469	0.442	258	709	0.364	369	496	0.744	250	678	86	1014	31.7	375	11.7	68	152	401	537	12	3
Indiana	31	1862	60.1	659	1532	0.43	167	498	0.335	377	581	0.649	314	638	83	1035	33.4	364	11.7	64	191	542	600	13	3

Source: Fox Sports

== Postseason ==
=== Big Ten tournament ===
#3 Purdue defeated #5 Ohio State in the 2009 Big Ten Conference men's basketball tournament championship game by a 65–61 margin. The All-Big Ten tournament team honorees were Boilermakers Robbie Hummel (Most Outstanding Player), JaJuan Johnson and E'Twaun Moore, Buckeye Evan Turner and Mike Davis of Illinois.

==== Schedule ====
Session	Game	Time	Matchup^{#}	Television	Score	Attendance
Opening round – Thursday, March 12
1	1	12:00 PM	#8 Minnesota vs #9 Northwestern	BTN	66–53	12,174
1	2	2:30 PM	#7 Michigan vs #10 Iowa	BTN	73–45	12,174
1	3	5:00 PM	#6 Penn State vs #11 Indiana	ESPN	66–51	12,174
Quarterfinals – Friday, March 13
2	4	12:00 PM	#1 Michigan State vs #8 Minnesota	ESPN	64–56	13,023
2	5	2:30 PM	#4 Wisconsin vs #5 Ohio State	ESPN	61–57	13,023
3	6	6:30 PM	#2 Illinois vs #7 Michigan	BTN	60–50	14,647
3	7	9:00 PM	#3 Purdue vs #6 Penn State	BTN	79–65	14,647
Semifinals – Saturday, March 14
4	8	1:40 PM	#1 Michigan State vs #5 Ohio State	CBS	82–70	15,728
4	9	4:05 PM	#2 Illinois vs #3 Purdue	CBS	66–56	15,728
Championship Game – Sunday, March 15
5	10	3:30 PM	#5 Ohio State vs #3 Purdue	CBS	65–51	12,526
Game times in EST. #-Rankings denote tournament seeding.

=== NCAA tournament ===
# of Bids	Record	Win %	R32	S16	E8	F4	CG
7	9–7	.563	4	2	1	1	1

Team	Bid Type	Seed	Results
Michigan State	At Large	2	Won First round vs. #15 Robert Morris 77–62; Won Second Round vs. #10 USC; Won Regional semifinal vs. #3 Kansas 67–62; Won Regional Final vs. #1 Louisville 64–52; Won National semifinal vs. #1 Connecticut 82–73; Lost National Championship vs. #1 North Carolina 89–72
Purdue	Automatic	5	Won First round vs. #12 Northern Iowa 59–56; Won Second Round vs. #4 Washington 76–74; Lost Regional semifinal vs. #1 Connecticut 72–60
Illinois	At Large	5	Lost First round vs. #12 Western Kentucky 76–72
Ohio State	At-large	8	Lost First round vs. #9 Siena 74–72 (2OT)
Michigan	At Large	10	Won First round vs. #7 Clemson 62–59; Lost Second Round vs. #2 Oklahoma 73–63
Minnesota	At-large	10	Lost First round vs. #7 Texas 76–62
Wisconsin	At-large	12	Won First round vs. #5 Florida State 61–59 (OT); Lost Second Round vs. #4 Xavier 60–49

Goran Suton was the Midwest regional most outstanding player. He was joined by teammates Kalin Lucas and Travis Walton on the NCAA tournament All-Midwest Regional team. Michigan State became the first team to play in the Final Four in their home state since Duke in 1994 and the first Big Ten team since Purdue in 1980. They were also the team with the second shortest trip (92 miles (148 km)) to the Final Four since it was bracketed in 1985.

=== National Invitation tournament ===
# of Bids	Record	Win %	R2	R3	SF	CG
2	5–1	.833	1	1	1	1

Team	Bid Type	Seed	Results
Penn State	At Large	2	Won First round vs. #7 George Mason 77–73 (OT); Won Second Round vs. #6 Rhode Island 83–72; Won Third round vs. #1 Florida 71–62; Won Semifinals vs. #2 Notre Dame 67–59; Won Championship vs. #3 Baylor 69–63
Northwestern	At-large	4	Lost First round vs. #5 Tulsa 68–59

Jamelle Cornley was the most outstanding player of the tournament.

=== Other tournaments ===
The Big Ten did not have any entrants in the other post season tournaments.

=== 2009 NBA draft ===
Several All Big Ten players who completed their eligibility were not drafted. Among those, Marcus Landry made it to the NBA the following season nonetheless. The following players were selected in the 2009 NBA draft

PG	Point guard	SG	Shooting guard	SF	Small forward	PF	Power forward	C	Center

Round	Pick	Player	Position	Nationality	Team	School/club team
1	24	Byron Mullens	C	United States	Dallas Mavericks (from Portland,^{[a]} traded to Oklahoma City)^{[A]}	Ohio State (Fr.)
2	50	Goran Suton	C	Bosnia and Herzegovina; United States	Utah Jazz	Michigan State (Sr.)

a: Goran Suton was born in Bosnia and Herzegovina and became a naturalized citizen of the United States in 2006.

==== Pre-draft trades ====
- ^{1} On June 24, 2009, Portland acquired the 22nd pick from Dallas in exchange for the 24th pick, 56th pick and a 2010 second-round draft pick. Portland used the 22nd pick to draft Víctor Claver and Dallas used the 24th and 56th pick to draft Byron Mullens and Ahmad Nivins respectively.

==== Draft-day trades ====
The following trades involving drafted players were made on the day of the draft.

- ^{A 1} ^{2} Oklahoma City acquired the draft rights to 24th pick Byron Mullens from Dallas in exchange for the draft rights to 25th pick Rodrigue Beaubois and a future second-round draft pick.

== See also ==
- 2008–09 NCAA Division I men's basketball season
- 2009 Big Ten Conference men's basketball tournament
