= Bill Carmody =

Basketball Coach

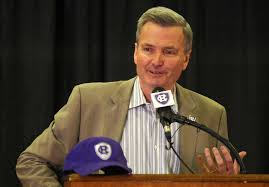
- Carmody introduced at Holy Cross, March 2015

Biographical details
- Born: December 4, 1951 (age 74); Rahway, New Jersey, U.S.

Playing career
- 1970–1975: Union (NY)

Coaching career (HC unless noted)
- 1975–1976: Fulton–Montgomery CC
- 1976–1980: Union (NY) (assistant)
- 1980–1981: Providence (assistant)
- 1982–1996: Princeton (assistant)
- 1996–2000: Princeton
- 2000–2013: Northwestern
- 2015–2019: Holy Cross

Head coaching record
- Overall: 342–308
- Tournaments: 2–3 (NCAA Division I); 5–6 (NIT)

Accomplishments and honors

Championships
- 2 Ivy League regular season (1997, 1998); Patriot League tournament (2016)

Awards
- Big Ten Coach of the Year (2004)

Records
- Ivy League career winning percentage (min 4 seasons, 78.6% — 92–25, Princeton, 1996–2000)

William D. Carmody (born December 4, 1951) is an American retired men's college basketball coach, formerly the head coach at the College of the Holy Cross. He was the head coach of the Wildcats men's basketball team at Northwestern University from 2000 through 2013. From 1996 through 2000, Carmody was the head coach at Princeton University.

== Early life and education ==
Carmody was born in Rahway, New Jersey, and grew up in Spring Lake, where he attended St. Rose High School, a Roman Catholic private school, in nearby Belmar. He attended and graduated from Union College in Schenectady, New York, with a Bachelor of Arts degree in history in 1975. He led Union's basketball team to a 59–11 record in his three years as a starter.

== Career ==
After graduating from Union College, Carmody served as head coach of Fulton-Montgomery Community College in Johnstown, New York, and led the team to a 17–10 record and conference title in his only season there. He returned to Union the following year as an assistant coach under head coach Bill Scanlon. In 1980, Carmody became a part-time assistant at Providence College, where he worked for 2 seasons under head coach Gary Walters.

=== Princeton ===
From 1982 through 1996, he was an assistant basketball coach at Princeton University under the Tigers' legendary coach, Pete Carril. After fourteen years, he became the head coach in 1996 when Carril retired. Despite not being able to offer athletic scholarships due to Ivy League rules, Carmody's 1997–1998 team reached a ranking as high as 7th nationally, and was ranked 8th nationally going into the NCAA Tournament. This led to a number-five seed in the NCAA tournament. That team lost in the second round of the tournament to #4 seed (and eventual 10th ranked) Michigan State, and was ranked 16th nationally at the conclusion of the tournament. He is considered one of the leading practitioners of the Princeton offense. While coaching Princeton, he established the Ivy League career winning percentage record of 78.6%, going 92–25.

=== Northwestern ===
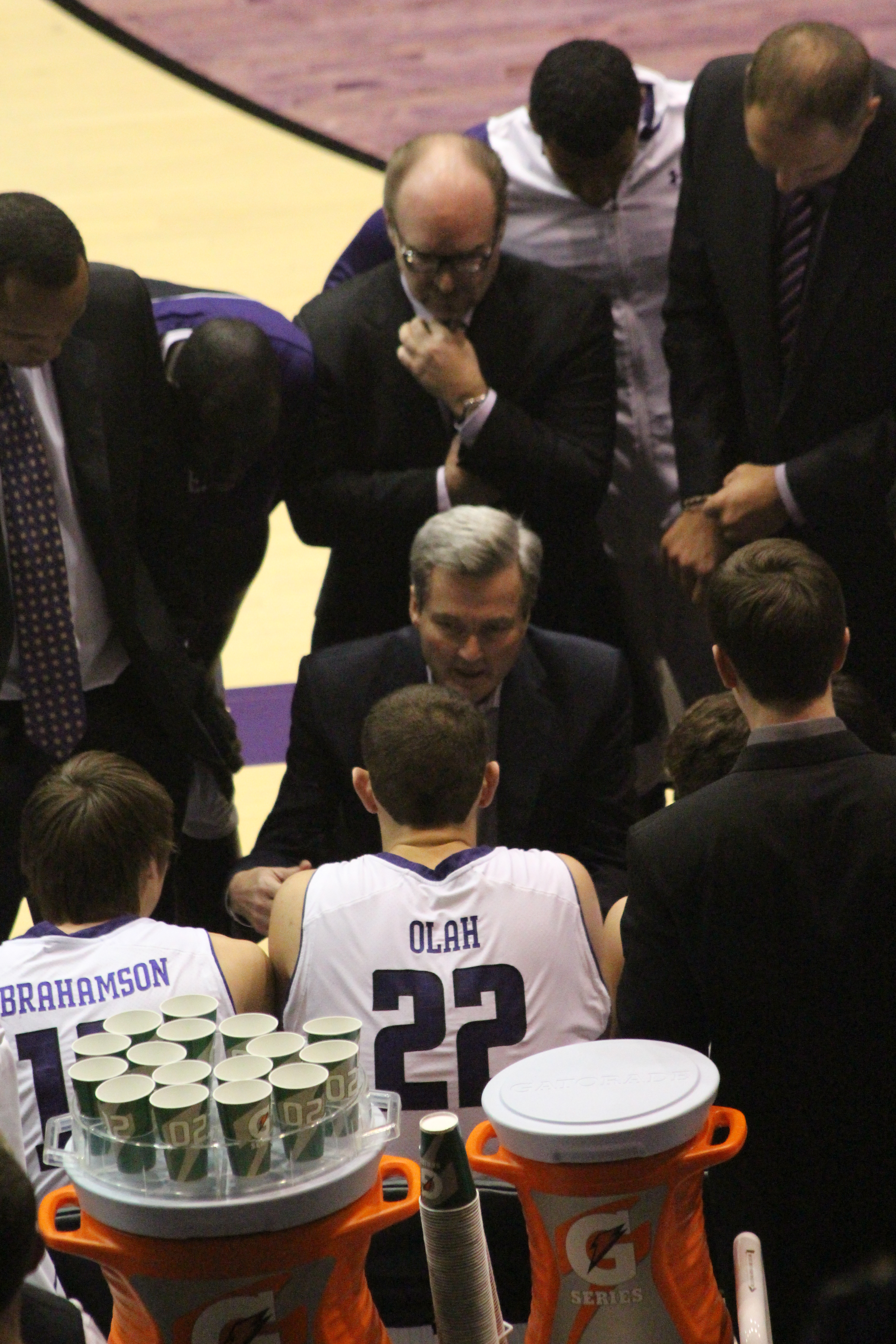
Carmody (center) in the Northwestern huddle on January 3, 2013

In 2000, he succeeded Kevin O'Neill as the head coach of the Northwestern Wildcats men's basketball team. One of his top assistants from 2000 to 2006 was Craig Robinson, the brother of former First Lady Michelle Obama. From 2008 to 2014, Robinson was the head coach at Oregon State University.

In 2003–04, Carmody led the Wildcats to an 8–8 record in Big Ten play, their first non-losing record in conference play since 1967–68.

On January 18, Northwestern defeated the 17th-ranked Minnesota Golden Gophers. On January 21, 2009, Carmody's Kevin Coble-led Wildcats defeated number-seven Michigan State University at the Breslin Center in East Lansing, Michigan earning their second consecutive win over an opponent ranked in the AP top 25, marking the first time in school history for such a feat. The 2008–09 unit became the first in school history to win 20 games and briefly flirted with the first NCAA Tournament appearance in school history.

On December 28, 2009, Northwestern was ranked number 25 in the Associated Press Basketball Poll, marking the first time Northwestern had been ranked in the AP Poll since 1969. The 2009–10 team also notched the school's second-ever 20-win season.

Despite Carmody's efforts to upgrade the Wildcat program, his teams never finished higher than fifth in the Big Ten, and his 2003–04 team was the only one that finished with even a .500 record in conference play. After the Wildcats suffered their first losing season in six years, Carmody was fired on March 16, 2013. At the time of his departure, he left as the winningest coach in school history.

=== Holy Cross ===
After spending the 2014–15 season as a special assistant and advisor to Fairfield coach Sydney Johnson, Carmody was hired as the head coach of the Holy Cross Crusaders in March 2015. In Carmody's first year with the Crusaders, his team won the Patriot League Tournament Championship. After going 0–9 on the road in league play, he completed a magical conference tournament run of 4–0 on the road to claim the crown.

Carmody would coach three more seasons at Holy Cross before ultimately retiring after the 2018–2019 season.

== Head coaching record ==
Record table
Season	Team	Overall	Conference	Standing	Postseason
Princeton Tigers (Ivy League) (1996–2000)
1996–97	Princeton	24–4	14–0	1st	NCAA Division I First Round
1997–98	Princeton	27–2	14–0	1st	NCAA Division I Second Round
1998–99	Princeton	22–8	11–3	2nd	NIT Quarterfinal
1999–00	Princeton	19–11	11–3	2nd	NIT First Round
Princeton:		92–25 (.786)	50–6 (.893)		
Northwestern Wildcats (Big Ten Conference) (2000–2013)
2000–01	Northwestern	11–19	3–13	11th	
2001–02	Northwestern	16–13	7–9	7th	
2002–03	Northwestern	12–17	3–13	10th	
2003–04	Northwestern	14–15	8–8	T–5th	
2004–05	Northwestern	15–16	6–10	8th	
2005–06	Northwestern	14–15	6–10	T–8th	
2006–07	Northwestern	13–18	2–14	T–10th	
2007–08	Northwestern	8–22	1–17	11th	
2008–09	Northwestern	17–14	8–10	9th	NIT First Round
2009–10	Northwestern	20–14	7–11	7th	NIT First Round
2010–11	Northwestern	20–14	7–11	8th	NIT Quarterfinal
2011–12	Northwestern	19–14	8–10	7th	NIT Second Round
2012–13	Northwestern	13–19	4–14	11th	
Northwestern:		192–210 (.478)	70–150 (.318)		
Holy Cross Crusaders (Patriot League) (2015–2019)
2015–16	Holy Cross	15–20	5–13	9th	NCAA Division I First Round
2016–17	Holy Cross	15–17	9–9	5th	
2017–18	Holy Cross	12–19	8–10	6th	
2018–19	Holy Cross	16–17	6–12	10th	
Holy Cross:		58–73 (.443)	28–44 (.389)		
Total:		342–308 (.526)			
National champion Postseason invitational champion Conference regular season champion Conference regular season and conference tournament champion Division regular season champion Division regular season and conference tournament champion Conference tournament champion
