= 2009 Big Ten men's basketball tournament =

- Classification: Division I
- Season: 2008–09
- Teams: 11
- Site: Conseco Fieldhouse; Indianapolis, Indiana
- Champions: Purdue (1st title)
- Winning coach: Matt Painter (1st title)
- MVP: Robbie Hummel (Purdue)
- Television: BTN, ESPN, ESPN2, and CBS

2008–09 Big Ten Conference men's basketball standings
| | Conf. | | | | Overall |
| Team | W | | L | PCT | W | | L | PCT |
|---|---|---|---|---|---|---|---|---|
| No. 8 Michigan State | 15 | – | 3 | .833 | 31 | – | 7 | .816 |
| No. 17 Purdue† | 11 | – | 7 | .611 | 27 | – | 10 | .730 |
| Illinois | 11 | – | 7 | .611 | 24 | – | 10 | .706 |
| Penn State | 10 | – | 8 | .556 | 27 | – | 11 | .711 |
| Ohio State | 10 | – | 8 | .556 | 22 | – | 11 | .667 |
| Wisconsin | 10 | – | 8 | .556 | 20 | – | 13 | .606 |
| Minnesota | 9 | – | 9 | .500 | 22 | – | 11 | .667 |
| Michigan | 9 | – | 9 | .500 | 21 | – | 14 | .600 |
| Northwestern | 8 | – | 10 | .444 | 17 | – | 14 | .548 |
| Iowa | 5 | – | 13 | .278 | 15 | – | 17 | .469 |
| Indiana | 1 | – | 17 | .056 | 6 | – | 25 | .194 |
† 2009 Big Ten tournament winner Rankings from AP poll

The 2009 Big Ten men's basketball tournament was played between March 12 and March 15, 2009, at Conseco Fieldhouse in Indianapolis, Indiana. It was the twelfth annual Big Ten men's basketball tournament. The championship was won by Purdue who defeated Ohio State in the championship game. As a result, Purdue received the Big Ten's automatic bid to the NCAA tournament. The win marked Purdue's first tournament championship in only their second appearance.

== Seeds ==
All Big Ten schools played in the tournament. Teams were seeded by conference record, with a tiebreaker system used to seed teams with identical conference records. Seeding for the tournament was determined at the close of the regular conference season. The top five teams received a first round bye.

| Seed | School | Conference | Tiebreaker |
|---|---|---|---|
| 1 | Michigan St | 15–3 | |
| 2 | Illinois | 11–7 | 2–0 vs Pur |
| 3 | Purdue | 11–7 | 0–2 vs Ill |
| 4 | Wisconsin | 10–8 | 3–0 vs PSU, OSU |
| 5 | Ohio St | 10–8 | 1–1 vs Wisc, PSU |
| 6 | Penn St | 10–8 | 0–3 vs Wisc, OSU |
| 7 | Michigan | 9–9 | 2–0 vs Minn. |
| 8 | Minnesota | 9–9 | 0–2 vs Mich. |
| 9 | Northwestern | 8–10 | |
| 10 | Iowa | 5–13 | |
| 11 | Indiana | 1–17 | |

== Schedule ==
| Session | Game | Time | Matchup^{#} | Score | Television | Attendance |
Opening round – Thursday, March 12
| 1 | 1 | 12:00 PM | #8 Minnesota vs #9 Northwestern | 66–53 | BTN | 12,174 |
| 1 | 2 | 2:30 PM | #7 Michigan vs #10 Iowa | 73–45 | BTN | 12,174 |
| 1 | 3 | 5:00 PM | #6 Penn State vs #11 Indiana | 66–51 | ESPN | 12,174 |
Quarterfinals – Friday, March 13
| 2 | 4 | 12:00 PM | #1 Michigan State vs #8 Minnesota | 64–56 | ESPN | 13,023 |
| 2 | 5 | 2:30 PM | #4 Wisconsin vs #5 Ohio State | 57–61 | ESPN | 13,023 |
| 3 | 6 | 6:30 PM | #2 Illinois vs #7 Michigan | 60–50 | BTN | 14,647 |
| 3 | 7 | 9:00 PM | #3 Purdue vs #6 Penn State | 79–54 | BTN | 14,647 |
Semifinals – Saturday, March 14
| 4 | 8 | 1:40 PM | #1 Michigan State vs #5 Ohio State | 70–82 | CBS | 15,728 |
| 4 | 9 | 4:05 PM | #2 Illinois vs #3 Purdue | 56–66 | CBS | 15,728 |
Championship Game – Sunday, March 15
| 5 | 10 | 3:30 PM | #5 Ohio State vs #3 Purdue | 61–65 | CBS | 12,526 |
Game times in EST. #-Rankings denote tournament seeding.

== Bracket ==
Opening round Thursday, March 12
8 | Minnesota | 66
9 | Northwestern | 53
7 | Michigan | 73
10 | Iowa | 45
6 | Penn State | 66
11 | Indiana | 52

Quarterfinals; Friday, March 13
1 | #7 Michigan State | 64
8 | Minnesota | 56
4 | Wisconsin | 57
5 | Ohio State | 61
2 | Illinois | 60
7 | Michigan | 50
3 | #24 Purdue | 79
6 | Penn State | 65

Semifinals; Saturday, March 14
1 | #7 Michigan State | 70
5 | Ohio State | 82
2 | Illinois | 56
3 | #24 Purdue | 66

Championship; Sunday, March 15
5 | Ohio State | 61
3 | #24 Purdue | 65

== Honors ==
=== All-Tournament Team ===
- Robbie Hummel, Purdue – Big Ten tournament Most Outstanding Player
- Mike Davis, Illinois
- Evan Turner, Ohio State
- JaJuan Johnson, Purdue
- E'Twaun Moore, Purdue
