= 2008–09 Minnesota Golden Gophers men's basketball team =

American college basketball season

2008–09 Minnesota Golden Gophers men's basketball

NCAA tournament first round vs. Texas, L 76–62
- Conference: Big Ten Conference
- Record: 22–11 (9–9 Big Ten)
- Head coach: Tubby Smith
- Assistant coaches: Ron Jirsa; Saul Smith; Vince Taylor
- Home arena: Williams Arena

2008–09 Big Ten Conference men's basketball standings
	Conf.				Overall
Team	W		L	PCT	W		L	PCT
No. 8 Michigan State	15	–	3	.833	31	–	7	.816
No. 17 Purdue†	11	–	7	.611	27	–	10	.730
Illinois	11	–	7	.611	24	–	10	.706
Penn State	10	–	8	.556	27	–	11	.711
Ohio State	10	–	8	.556	22	–	11	.667
Wisconsin	10	–	8	.556	20	–	13	.606
Minnesota	9	–	9	.500	22	–	11	.667
Michigan	9	–	9	.500	21	–	14	.600
Northwestern	8	–	10	.444	17	–	14	.548
Iowa	5	–	13	.278	15	–	17	.469
Indiana	1	–	17	.056	6	–	25	.194
† 2009 Big Ten tournament winner Rankings from AP poll

The 2008–09 Minnesota Golden Gophers men's basketball team represented the University of Minnesota in the college basketball season of 2008–2009. The team's head coach was Tubby Smith. This was Smith's second year as Minnesota's head coach. The Golden Gophers played their home games at Williams Arena in Minneapolis, Minnesota. The Big Ten Network included the team in a two-and-a-half-hour special that featured Midnight Madness events from several Big Ten campuses on October 17, 2008; the Minnesota event to kick off the season was called "Tubby's Tipoff". The Gophers started the season on a twelve-game winning streak for the first time since the 1948–49 season. The team became ranked on December 22, the first time the team had been ranked since the 2002–03 season.

Recruit Royce White signed with the Minnesota Golden Gophers, but did not play due to shoplifting and trespassing charges. He transferred to Iowa State in July 2010.

== Roster ==
#	Name	Height	Weight (lbs.)	Position	Class	Hometown	Previous Team(s)
0	Al Nolen	6'1"	180	G	So.	Minneapolis, MN, U.S.	Minneapolis Henry HS
1	Paul Carter	6'8"	195	F	So.	Little Rock, AR, U.S.	Little Rock Mills HS; Missouri State-West Plains
3	Kevin Payton	6'5"	215	G/F	RJr.	Camden, NJ, U.S.	Camden HS
4	Travis Busch	6'4"	220	G/F	Jr.	Mounds View, MN, U.S.	Mounds View HS
5	Devoe Joseph	6'3"	170	G	Fr.	Ajax, ON, Canada	Pickering HS
11	Jonathan Williams	6'9"	250	G	Sr.	St. Cloud, MN, U.S.	Notre Dame Prep; St. Cloud Apollo HS
20	Lawrence Westbrook	6'0"	195	G	Jr.	Chandler, AZ, U.S.	Winchendon Prep
22	Devron Bostick	6'5"	210	G	Jr.	Racine, WI, U.S.	St. Catharine's HS; SW Illinois
24	Blake Hoffarber	6'4"	200	G	So.	Minnetonka, MN, U.S.	Hopkins HS
33	Jamal Abu-Shamala	6'5"	210	G/F	Sr.	Shakopee, MN, U.S.	Shakopee HS
34	Damian Johnson	6'7"	195	F	RJr.	Thibodaux, LA, U.S.	Thibodaux HS
45	Colton Iverson	6'10"	235	F/C	Fr.	Yankton, SD, U.S.	Yankton HS
50	Ralph Sampson III	6'11"	220	F/C	Fr.	Duluth, GA, U.S.	Northview HS

=== Incoming signees ===
College recruiting information
Name	Hometown	School	Height	Weight	Commit date
Ralph Sampson III; C	Duluth, Georgia	Northview HS	6 ft 11 in (2.11 m)	220 lb (100 kg)	Oct 25, 2007
Ralph Sampson III; C	Recruit ratings: Scout: Rivals: (89)				
Devoe Joseph; SG	Ajax, Ontario	Picking HS	6 ft 3 in (1.91 m)	170 lb (77 kg)	Nov 21, 2007
Devoe Joseph; SG	Recruit ratings: Scout: Rivals: (76)				
Colton Iverson; PF/C	Yankton, South Dakota	Yankton HS	6 ft 10 in (2.08 m)	238 lb (108 kg)	Sep 19, 2007
Colton Iverson; PF/C	Recruit ratings: Scout: Rivals: (88)				
Paul Carter; F	West Plains, Missouri	Missouri State – West Plains	6 ft 8 in (2.03 m)	193 lb (88 kg)	Aug 21, 2007
Paul Carter; F	Recruit ratings: Scout: Rivals: (n/a)				
Devron Bostick; SF	Belleville, Illinois	Southwestern Illinois	6 ft 5 in (1.96 m)	213 lb (97 kg)	Oct 11, 2007
Devron Bostick; SF	Recruit ratings: Scout: Rivals: (n/a)				
Overall recruit ranking: Scout: 27 Rivals: 23
Note: In many cases, Scout, Rivals, 247Sports, On3, and ESPN may conflict in their listings of height and weight.; In these cases, the average was taken. ESPN grades are on a 100-point scale.; Sources: "Minnesota Commit List for 2008". Rivals.; "Men's Basketball Recruiting". Scout.; "ESPN – Minnesota Golden Gophers Basketball Recruiting 2008". ESPN.; "Scout.com Team Recruiting Rankings". Scout.; "2008 Team Ranking". Rivals.

== 2008–09 Schedule and Results ==
Date time, TV	Rank^{#}	Opponent^{#}	Result	Record	Site city, state
Exhibition
November 3, 2008*; 7:00 pm		St. Cloud State	W 88–80		Williams Arena; Minneapolis, MN
November 6, 2008*; 7:00 pm		Northern State	W 92–62		Williams Arena; Minneapolis, MN
Regular Season
November 14, 2008*; 7:00 pm		Concordia, St. Paul; NABC Classic	W 76–51	1–0	Williams Arena; Minneapolis, MN
November 15, 2008*; 7:00 pm		Bowling Green; NABC Classic	W 68–61	2–0	Williams Arena; Minneapolis, MN
November 16, 2008*; 7:00		Georgia State; NABC Classic	W 60–52	3–0	Williams Arena; Minneapolis, MN
November 22, 2008*; 9:00, The Mtn.		at Colorado State	W 72–71	4–0	Moby Arena; Fort Collins, CO
November 26, 2008*; 7:30, BTN		Eastern Washington	W 88–67	5–0	Williams Arena; Minneapolis, MN
November 29, 2008*; 1:00, BTN		North Dakota State	W 90–76	6–0	Williams Arena; Minneapolis, MN
December 2, 2008*; 8:30, ESPN2		Virginia; ACC–Big Ten Challenge	W 66–56	7–0	Williams Arena; Minneapolis, MN
December 6, 2008*; 1:00		Cornell	W 71–54	8–0	Williams Arena; Minneapolis, MN
December 10, 2008*; 8:00, BTN		South Dakota State	W 74–60	9–0	Williams Arena; Minneapolis, MN
December 20, 2008*; 1:00, FSN North		vs. No. 9 Louisville; Stadium Shootout	W 70–64	10–0	University of Phoenix Stadium; Glendale, AZ
December 23, 2008*; 8:00, ESPNU	No. 23	Southeastern Louisiana	W 80–71	11–0	Williams Arena; Minneapolis, MN
December 28, 2008*; 7:00, ESPNU	No. 23	High Point	W 82–56	12–0	Williams Arena; Minneapolis, MN
Big Ten Regular Season
December 31, 2008; 11:00am, BTN	No. 21	No. 10 Michigan State	L 58–70	12–1 (0–1)	Williams Arena; Minneapolis, MN
January 3, 2009; 11:00am, BTN	No. 21	No. 24 Ohio State	W 68–59	13–1 (1–1)	Williams Arena; Minneapolis, MN
January 8, 2009; 6:00, ESPN2	No. 22	at Iowa	W 52–49	14–1 (2–1)	Carver-Hawkeye Arena; Iowa City, IA
January 11, 2009; 2:30, BTN	No. 22	Penn State	W 79–59	15–1 (3–1)	Williams Arena; Minneapolis, MN
January 15, 2009; 8:00, BTN	No. 18	at Wisconsin	W 78–74 ^{(OT)}	16–1 (4–1)	Kohl Center; Madison, WI
January 18, 2009; 1:00, BTN	No. 18	at Northwestern	L 65–74	16–2 (4–2)	Welsh-Ryan Arena; Evanston, IL
January 22, 2009; 6:00, ESPN2	No. 21	No. 18 Purdue	L 62–70	16–3 (4–3)	Williams Arena; Minneapolis, MN
January 25, 2009; 11:00am, BTN	No. 21	at Indiana	W 67–63	17–3 (5–3)	Assembly Hall; Bloomington, IN
January 29, 2009; 8:00, BTN		No. 19 Illinois	W 59–36	18–3 (6–3)	Williams Arena; Minneapolis, MN
February 4, 2009; 7:30, BTN	No. 19	at No. 13 Michigan State	L 47–76	18–4 (6–4)	Breslin Center; East Lansing, MI
February 7, 2009; 7:00, BTN	No. 19	at Ohio State	L 58–64	18–5 (6–5)	Schottenstein Center; Columbus, OH
February 10, 2009; 8:00, BTN		Indiana	W 62–54	19–5 (7–5)	Williams Arena; Minneapolis, MN
February 14, 2009; 12:30, BTN		at Penn State	L 63–68	19–6 (7–6)	Bryce Jordan Center; State College, PA
February 19, 2009; 6:00, BTN		at Michigan	W 74–62	19–7 (7–7)	Crisler Arena; Ann Arbor, MI
February 22, 2009; 6:00, BTN		Northwestern	W 72–45	20–7 (8–7)	Williams Arena; Minneapolis, MN
February 26, 2009; 6:00, BTN		at No. 20 Illinois	L 41–52	20–8 (8–8)	Assembly Hall; Champaign, IL
March 4, 2009; 7:30, BTN		Wisconsin	W 51–46	21–8 (9–8)	Williams Arena; Minneapolis, MN
March 7, 2009; 11:00am, ESPN		Michigan	L 64–67	21–9 (9–9)	Williams Arena; Minneapolis, MN
2009 Big Ten tournament
March 12, 2009*; 11:00am, BTN	(8)	vs. (9) Northwestern; First Round	W 66–53	22–9	Conseco Fieldhouse; Indianapolis, IN
March 13, 2009*; 11:00am, ESPN	(8)	vs. (1) No. 7 Michigan State; Quarterfinal	L 56–64	22–10	Conseco Fieldhouse; Indianapolis, IN
2009 NCAA Men's Basketball tournament
March 19, 2009*; 6:10, CBS	(10 E)	vs. (7 E) Texas; First Round	L 62–76	22–11	Greensboro Coliseum; Greensboro, NC
*Non-conference game. ^{#}Rankings from AP Poll. (#) Tournament seedings in parentheses. All times are in Central Time.

== Rankings ==
Poll	Pre	Wk 1	Wk 2	Wk 3	Wk 4	Wk 5	Wk 6	Wk 7	Wk 8	Wk 9	Wk 10	Wk 11	Wk 12	Wk 13	Wk 14	Wk 15	Wk 16	Wk 17	Wk 18	Final
AP							23	21	22	18	21	NR	19	NR						
Coaches							23	21	19	17	20	24	19	NR						
