= 2008–09 Indiana Hoosiers men's basketball team =

American college basketball season

2008–09 Indiana Hoosiers men's basketball
- Conference: Big Ten Conference
- Record: 6–25 (1–17 Big Ten)
- Head coach: Tom Crean
- Assistant coaches: Tim Buckley; Bennie Seltzer; Roshown McLeod
- Home arena: Assembly Hall

2008–09 Big Ten Conference men's basketball standings
	Conf.				Overall
Team	W		L	PCT	W		L	PCT
No. 8 Michigan State	15	–	3	.833	31	–	7	.816
No. 17 Purdue†	11	–	7	.611	27	–	10	.730
Illinois	11	–	7	.611	24	–	10	.706
Penn State	10	–	8	.556	27	–	11	.711
Ohio State	10	–	8	.556	22	–	11	.667
Wisconsin	10	–	8	.556	20	–	13	.606
Minnesota	9	–	9	.500	22	–	11	.667
Michigan	9	–	9	.500	21	–	14	.600
Northwestern	8	–	10	.444	17	–	14	.548
Iowa	5	–	13	.278	15	–	17	.469
Indiana	1	–	17	.056	6	–	25	.194
† 2009 Big Ten tournament winner Rankings from AP poll

The 2008–09 Indiana Hoosiers men's basketball team represented Indiana University. The head coach was Tom Crean. The team played its home games in the Assembly Hall in Bloomington, Indiana, and was a member of the Big Ten Conference.

The Big Ten Network included the team in a two-and-a-half-hour special that featured Midnight Madness events from several Big Ten campuses on October 17, 2008; the Indiana event to kick off the season was called "Hoosier Hysteria". The Hoosiers defeated the Northwestern St. Demons on November 14 in Head Coach Tom Crean's opening game.

In November 2008, the NCAA imposed a three-year probation on the Indiana men's basketball program and upheld the school's self-imposed sanctions stemming from the actions of former head coach Kelvin Sampson and his staff. School athletic director Rick Greenspan resigned. There was no ban for the program in television, scholarships or post-season play.

== Roster ==
Name	Number	Position	Height	Weight	Year	Hometown
Kory Barnett	30	F	6–6	186	Freshman	Rochester, Indiana
Devan Dumes	33	G	6–2	188	Junior	Indianapolis, Indiana
Brett Finkelmeier	4	G	6–1	188	Sophomore	Carmel, Indiana
Steven Gambles	24	F	6–4	220	Junior	Indianapolis, Indiana
Tijan Jobe	40	C	7–0	255	Junior	Banjul, The Gambia
Verdell Jones III	12	G	6–5	176	Freshman	Champaign, Illinois
Broderick Lewis	32	F	6–6	195	Freshman	West Lafayette, Indiana
Daniel Moore	3	G	5–11	167	Freshman	Carmel, Indiana
Tom Pritchard	25	F	6–9	242	Freshman	Westlake, Ohio
Jeremiah Rivers	5	G	6–5	210	Junior	Winter Park, Florida
Matt Roth	2	G	6–3	186	Freshman	Washington, Illinois
Kipp Schutz	23	G	6–4	200	Sophomore	Evansville, Indiana
Malik Story	34	F	6–5	222	Freshman	Los Angeles, California
Kyle Taber	44	C	6–8	220	Senior	Evansville, Indiana
Evan White	1	G	6–0	190	Freshman	Fort Wayne, Indiana
Nick Williams	20	G	6–4	211	Freshman	Mobile, Alabama

Coaches: Tom Crean, Tim Buckley, Bennie Seltzer, Roshown McLeod

== Recruiting class ==
College recruiting information
Name	Hometown	School	Height	Weight	Commit date
Devan Dumes; SG	Vincennes, IN	Vincennes University	6 ft 2 in (1.88 m)	185 lb (84 kg)	Apr 20, 2008
Devan Dumes; SG	Recruit ratings: Scout: Rivals:				
Tijan Jobe; C	Olney, IL	Olney Central CC	7 ft 0 in (2.13 m)	265 lb (120 kg)	May 20, 2008
Tijan Jobe; C	Recruit ratings: Scout: Rivals:				
Verdell Jones; PG	Champaign, IL	Central	6 ft 4 in (1.93 m)	160 lb (73 kg)	May 5, 2008
Verdell Jones; PG	Recruit ratings: Scout: Rivals: (89)				
Tom Pritchard; C	Lakewood, OH	St. Edward	6 ft 8 in (2.03 m)	240 lb (110 kg)	Sep 17, 2007
Tom Pritchard; C	Recruit ratings: Scout: Rivals: (92)				
Matt Roth; SG	Metamora, IL	Washington	6 ft 3 in (1.91 m)	175 lb (79 kg)	Aug 22, 2007
Matt Roth; SG	Recruit ratings: Scout: Rivals: (89)				
Malik Story; SG	Cerritos, CA	Artesia	6 ft 5 in (1.96 m)	200 lb (91 kg)	Jun 21, 2008
Malik Story; SG	Recruit ratings: Rivals: (78)				
Nick Williams; SG	Mobile, AL	LeFlore	6 ft 4 in (1.93 m)	215 lb (98 kg)	Apr 21, 2008
Nick Williams; SG	Recruit ratings: Scout: Rivals: (96)				
Overall recruit ranking:
Note: In many cases, Scout, Rivals, 247Sports, On3, and ESPN may conflict in their listings of height and weight.; In these cases, the average was taken. ESPN grades are on a 100-point scale.; Sources: "2008 Team Ranking". Rivals.

== Schedule and results ==
Date time, TV	Rank^{#}	Opponent^{#}	Result	Record	Site city, state
Regular season
11/15/08*; 7:00pm, BTN		Northwestern State	W 85–65	1–0	Assembly Hall; Bloomington, IN
11/18/08*; 6:30pm, BTN		IUPUI	W 60–57	2–0	Assembly Hall; Bloomington, IN
11/24/08*; 5:30pm, ESPN2		vs. No. 8 Notre Dame; Maui Invitational	L 50–88	2–1	Lahaina Civic Center; Lahaina, HI
11/25/08*; 1:30pm, ESPNU		vs. St. Joseph's; Maui Invitational	L 50–84	2–2	Lahaina Civic Center; Lahaina, HI
11/26/08*; 7:00pm, ESPNU		vs. Chaminade; Maui Invitational	W 81–79	3–2	Lahaina Civic Center; Lahaina, HI
11/30/08*; 4:00pm, BTN		Cornell	W 72–57	4–2	Assembly Hall; Bloomington, IN
12/03/08*; 7:15pm, ESPN		at No. 25 Wake Forest; ACC–Big Ten Challenge	L 58–83	4–3	LJVM Coliseum; Winston-Salem, NC
12/06/08*; 1:30pm, BTN		vs. No. 11 Gonzaga; Hartford Hall of Fame Classic	L 54–70	4–4	Lucas Oil Stadium; Indianapolis, IN
12/10/08*; 8:00pm, ESPN2		TCU	W 66–56	5–4	Assembly Hall; Bloomington, IN
12/13/08*; 4:00pm, CBS		at Kentucky	L 54–72	5–5	Rupp Arena; Lexington, KY
12/22/08*; 9:00pm, BTN		Northeastern	L 42–55	5–6	Assembly Hall; Bloomington, IN
12/28/08*; 6:00pm, BTN		Lipscomb	L 69–74	5–7	Assembly Hall; Bloomington, IN
01/03/09; 4:30pm, BTN		at Iowa	L 60–65	5–8 (0–1)	Carver-Hawkeye Arena; Iowa City, IA
01/07/09; 6:30pm, BTN		Michigan	L 66–72 ^{OT}	5–9 (0–2)	Assembly Hall; Bloomington, IN
01/10/09; 3:00pm, BTN		at Illinois; Rivalry	L 45–76	5–10 (0–3)	Assembly Hall; Champaign, IL
01/13/09; 7:00pm, ESPN		at Ohio State	L 53–77	5–11 (0–4)	Value City Arena; Columbus, OH
01/17/09; 6:00pm, BTN		Penn State	L 55–65	5–12 (0–5)	Assembly Hall; Bloomington, IN
01/25/09; 12:00pm, BTN		No. 21 Minnesota	L 63–67	5–13 (0–6)	Assembly Hall; Bloomington, IN
01/28/09; 8:30pm, BTN		at Northwestern	L 75–77	5–14 (0–7)	Welsh-Ryan Arena; Evanston, IL
01/31/09; 4:00pm, ESPN2		Ohio State	L 81–93	5–15 (0–8)	Assembly Hall; Bloomington, IN
02/04/09; 6:30pm, BTN		Iowa	W 68–60	6–15 (1–8)	Assembly Hall; Bloomington, IN
02/07/09; 4:00pm, ESPN		at No. 14 Michigan State	L 47–75	6–16 (1–9)	Breslin Center; East Lansing, MI
02/10/09; 9:00pm, BTN		at Minnesota	L 54–62	6–17 (1–10)	Williams Arena; Minneapolis, MN
02/15/09; 1:00pm, CBS		No. 20 Illinois; Rivalry	L 52–65	6–18 (1–11)	Assembly Hall; Bloomington, IN
02/19/09; 9:00pm, ESPN		Wisconsin	L 51–68	6–19 (1–12)	Assembly Hall; Bloomington, IN
02/21/09; 2:00pm, BTN		at No. 21 Purdue; Rivalry/Crimson and Gold Cup	L 67–81	6–20 (1–13)	Mackey Arena; West Lafayette, IN
02/25/09; 6:30pm, BTN		Northwestern	L 53–75	6–21 (1–14)	Assembly Hall; Bloomington, IN
02/28/09; 6:00pm, BTN		at Penn State	L 58–61	6–22 (1–15)	Bryce Jordan Center; University Park, PA
03/03/09; 7:00pm, ESPN		No. 8 Michigan State	L 59–64	6–23 (1–16)	Assembly Hall; Bloomington, IN
03/08/09; 7:00pm, BTN		at Wisconsin	L 61–85	6–24 (1–17)	Kohl Center; Madison, WI
Big Ten tournament
03/12/09; 5:00pm, ESPN2	(11)	vs. (6) Penn State	L 51–66	6–25	Conseco Fieldhouse; Indianapolis, IN
*Non-conference game. ^{#}Rankings from Coaches' Poll. (#) Tournament seedings in parentheses. All times are in Eastern Time.

The 2008–09 season was the worst in the history of Indiana Basketball and finished with the fewest wins (6) since 1915–16. Their 1–17 conference record was the worst since the conference went to an 18-game schedule.

== See also ==
- Indiana Hoosiers men's basketball
- 2008-09 Big Ten Conference men's basketball season
- 2009 Big Ten Conference men's basketball tournament
- 2009 NCAA Division I men's basketball tournament
