= Mike Tisdale =

American basketball player

Personal information
- Born: September 15, 1989 (age 37)
- Listed height: 7 ft 1 in (2.16 m)
- Listed weight: 249 lb (113 kg)

Career information
- High school: Riverton (Riverton, Illinois)
- College: Illinois (2007–2011)
- NBA draft: 2011: undrafted
- Playing career: 2011–2012
- Position: Center

Career history
- 2011: Maine Red Claws
- 2012: Fort Wayne Mad Ants

Career highlights
- 3× Honorable mention All-Big Ten (2009–2011)

Mike Tisdale (born September 15, 1989) is an American former professional basketball player. He played college basketball at the University of Illinois.

Tisdale grew up in Riverton, Illinois, and attended the University of Illinois from 2007 to 2011. Tisdale finished second in school history with 176 career blocks and No. 25 on Illini all-time scoring list with 1,243 points. He also finished his career tied with Demetri McCamey for the most games played (139) in Illinois history.

Tisdale went undrafted in the June 2011 NBA draft. Tisdale signed with DJK Würzburg of Germany in August 2011, but his contract was voided before Tisdale appeared in any games for the team as DJK Würzburg claimed Tisdale had a back injury. In December 2011, Tisdale was signed by the Philadelphia 76ers for their training camp roster, but did not appear in any games for the team during the NBA pre-season and was waived before the start of the regular season. In 2011, Tisdale played for the Red Claws but was released after 8 games. In 2012, he signed with the Mad Ants but left after 12 games.
