= Riverton, Illinois =

Riverton
- Village
- Flag Logo

- Location of Riverton in Sangamon County, Illinois.
- Coordinates: 39°50′44″N 89°32′10″W
- Country: United States
- State: Illinois
- County: Sangamon

Area
  - Total: 3.14 sq mi (8.14 km^{2})
  - Land: 3.12 sq mi (8.08 km^{2})
  - Water: 0.023 sq mi (0.06 km^{2})
- Elevation: 581 ft (177 m)

Population (2020)
  - Total: 3,532
  - Density: 1,131.7/sq mi (436.97/km^{2})
- Time zone: UTC-6 (CST)
  - Summer (DST): UTC-5 (CDT)
- ZIP code: 62561
- Area code: 217
- FIPS code: 17-64486
- GNIS feature ID: 2399091
- Website: riverton.illinois.gov

Riverton is a village in Sangamon County, Illinois, United States. As of the 2020 census, Riverton had a population of 3,532. It is part of the Springfield, Illinois Metropolitan Statistical Area.

== History ==
Riverton was founded by John Taylor in 1837. Originally named Judy's Ferry for the ferry crossing the Sangamon River there, then Jamestown, after politician James Shields, the village was successful for about a decade, producing lumber for a planned railroad. When it was discovered that the railroad was badly constructed and unreliable, Jamestown fell into economic distress and the land on which it sat was sold. The town was sold to Joseph Loose of Maryland, then again to John D. Keedy, a Springfield distiller. Land south of Jamestown was purchased and a distillery was put up. Yet again, the properties were lost, first mortgaged to Jacob Bunn, then given as a claim settlement to Parley L. Howlett, another distiller. Jamestown was soon renamed Howlett, Shields had fallen from popularity, and a new flour mill and coal mine caused a short-lived boom. Despite their success, most of Howlett was sold to Jacob Bunn to pay off debt. Bunn started selling the lots to the residents, the only owner to do so. After a state requirement was passed preventing communities from being named after people, Howlett was rechristened as Riverton in the 1870s. In 1876, train robber Jesse James spent a night in Riverton while en route to a bank heist in Minnesota. Al Capone also reportedly used Riverton as one of his hideouts. Riverton historically had a higher immigrant population than other small towns in the Springfield area due to the coal mining industry.

== Geography ==
According to the 2010 census, Riverton has a total area of 2.216 square miles (5.74 km^{2}), of which 2.18 square miles (5.65 km^{2}) (or 98.38%) is land and 0.036 square miles (0.09 km^{2}) (or 1.62%) is water.

== Demographics ==
Historical population
Census	Pop.	Note	%±
1880	703		—
1890	1,127		60.3%
1900	1,511		34.1%
1910	1,911		26.5%
1920	1,916		0.3%
1930	1,582		−17.4%
1940	1,524		−3.7%
1950	1,450		−4.9%
1960	1,591		9.7%
1970	2,090		31.4%
1980	2,783		33.2%
1990	2,638		−5.2%
2000	3,048		15.5%
2010	3,455		13.4%
2020	3,532		2.2%
U.S. Decennial Census

=== 2020 census ===
As of the 2020 census, Riverton had a population of 3,532. The median age was 37.6 years. 25.8% of residents were under the age of 18 and 14.3% of residents were 65 years of age or older. For every 100 females there were 94.3 males, and for every 100 females age 18 and over there were 87.4 males age 18 and over.

97.1% of residents lived in urban areas, while 2.9% lived in rural areas.

There were 1,448 households in Riverton, of which 34.0% had children under the age of 18 living in them. Of all households, 43.6% were married-couple households, 18.3% were households with a male householder and no spouse or partner present, and 29.6% were households with a female householder and no spouse or partner present. About 28.5% of all households were made up of individuals and 10.5% had someone living alone who was 65 years of age or older.

There were 1,559 housing units, of which 7.1% were vacant. The homeowner vacancy rate was 2.0% and the rental vacancy rate was 10.2%.

Racial composition as of the 2020 census
Race	Number	Percent
White	3,171	89.8%
Black or African American	50	1.4%
American Indian and Alaska Native	10	0.3%
Asian	20	0.6%
Native Hawaiian and Other Pacific Islander	1	0.0%
Some other race	45	1.3%
Two or more races	235	6.7%
Hispanic or Latino (of any race)	83	2.3%

=== 2000 census ===
As of the census of 2000, there were 3,048 people, 1,236 households, and 845 families residing in the village. The population density was 1,497.4 inhabitants per square mile (578.1/km^{2}). There were 1,311 housing units at an average density of 644.1 per square mile (248.7/km^{2}). The racial makeup of the village was 98.92% White, 0.10% African American, 0.16% Native American, 0.10% Asian, and 0.72% from two or more races. Hispanic or Latino of any race were 0.92% of the population.

There were 1,236 households, out of which 36.1% had children under the age of 18 living with them, 51.9% were married couples living together, 12.6% had a female householder with no husband present, and 31.6% were non-families. 27.3% of all households were made up of individuals, and 10.6% had someone living alone who was 65 years of age or older. The average household size was 2.47 and the average family size was 2.98.

In the village, the population was spread out, with 27.3% under the age of 18, 7.7% from 18 to 24, 31.3% from 25 to 44, 22.8% from 45 to 64, and 10.9% who were 65 years of age or older. The median age was 35 years. For every 100 females, there were 93.0 males. For every 100 females age 18 and over, there were 88.8 males.

The median income for a household in the village was $45,531, and the median income for a family was $49,150. Males had a median income of $35,278 versus $26,421 for females. The per capita income for the village was $20,678. About 6.3% of families and 6.8% of the population were below the poverty line, including 8.7% of those under age 18 and 12.7% of those age 65 or over.

== Notable people ==
- Justin Allgaier (born 1986), NASCAR driver; childhood resident of Riverton.
- Sean Grayson (born 1994), former Sangamon County deputy who murdered Sonya Massey.
- Nellie McAleney Revell (1873–1958), writer and publicist, born in Riverton
- Mike Tisdale (born 1989), center with the Philadelphia 76ers and DJK Würzburg (Germany); grew up in Riverton.
