= 2008–09 Penn State Nittany Lions basketball team =

American college basketball season

2008–09 Penn State Nittany Lions men's basketball

National Invitation Tournament, Champions
- Conference: Big Ten Conference
- Record: 27–11 (10–8 Big Ten)
- Head coach: Ed DeChellis
- Assistant coaches: Kurt Kanaskie; Lewis Preston; Dan Earl
- Home arena: Bryce Jordan Center

2008–09 Big Ten Conference men's basketball standings
	Conf.				Overall
Team	W		L	PCT	W		L	PCT
No. 8 Michigan State	15	–	3	.833	31	–	7	.816
No. 17 Purdue†	11	–	7	.611	27	–	10	.730
Illinois	11	–	7	.611	24	–	10	.706
Penn State	10	–	8	.556	27	–	11	.711
Ohio State	10	–	8	.556	22	–	11	.667
Wisconsin	10	–	8	.556	20	–	13	.606
Minnesota	9	–	9	.500	22	–	11	.667
Michigan	9	–	9	.500	21	–	14	.600
Northwestern	8	–	10	.444	17	–	14	.548
Iowa	5	–	13	.278	15	–	17	.469
Indiana	1	–	17	.056	6	–	25	.194
† 2009 Big Ten tournament winner Rankings from AP poll

The 2008–09 Penn State Nittany Lions basketball team represented Pennsylvania State University and completed the season by winning the 2009 National Invitation Tournament over the Baylor Bears at Madison Square Garden in New York City. Head Coach, Ed DeChellis, coached his sixth season with the team. The team played its home games in University Park, Pennsylvania at the Bryce Jordan Center, which has a capacity of 15,261, for the twelfth consecutive season. The season marked the team's sixteenth consecutive season as a member of the Big Ten Conference.

== Current coaching staff ==
Position	Name	Year	Alma mater
Head coach	Ed DeChellis	2003	Penn State (1982)
Assistant coach	Kurt Kanaskie	2003	La Salle (1980)
Assistant coach	Lewis Preston	2008	VMI (1993)
Assistant coach	Dan Earl	2005	Penn State (1997)
Director of basketball operations	Jon Perry	2004	ETSU (2002)

== Roster ==
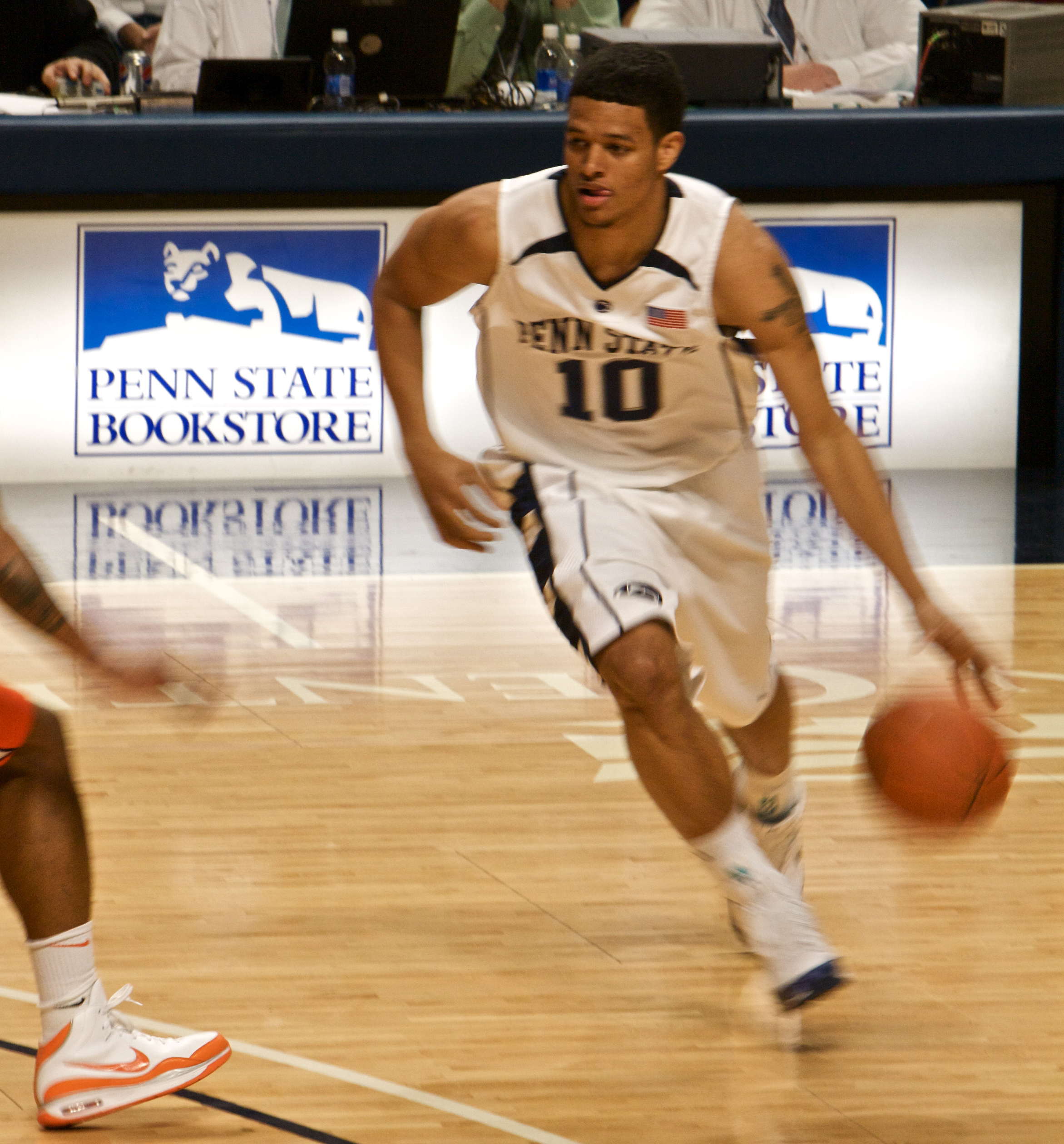
Chris Babb

Name	#	Position	Height	Weight	Year	Home Town
Chris Babb	10	Guard	6–5	210	Freshman	Arlington, TX
Talor Battle	12	Guard	5–11	165	Sophomore	Albany, NY
Jeff Brooks	25	Forward	6–8	200	Sophomore	Louisville, KY
Jamelle Cornley	2	Forward	6–5	240	Senior	Columbus, OH
Adam Highberger	14	Guard	6–2	170	Sophomore	Blairsville, PA
David Jackson	15	Forward	6–6	205	Sophomore	Farrell, PA
Andrew Jones III	22	Forward	6–9	245	Sophomore	Philadelphia
Steve Kirkpatrick	41	Forward	6–5	225	Sophomore	Carlisle, PA
Will Leiner	13	Guard	6–1	170	Senior	Coplay, PA
Danny Morrissey	33	Guard	6–3	190	Senior	Cleveland, OH
Billy Oliver	42	Forward	6–8	205	Freshman	Chatham, NJ
Andrew Ott	54	Forward	6–10	235	Sophomore	Abington, PA
Stanley Pringle	11	Guard	6–1	180	Senior	Virginia Beach, VA
Joonas Suotamo	21	Forward	6–10	230	Senior	Espoo, Finland
Cammeron Woodyard	24	Guard	6–5	205	Freshman	Westminster, MD

== Schedule and results ==
=== Preseason ===
Date time, TV	Opponent	Result	Record	Site city, state
Aug 30*; 12:00 p.m., no	vs. Waterloo	W 83–52	1–0	Sheridan College Athletic Centre - Davis Campus; Brampton, ON
Aug 30*; 7:00 p.m., no	at Sheridan	W 83–65	2–0	Sheridan College Athletic Centre - Davis Campus; Brampton, ON
Aug 31*; 7:00 p.m., no	at Ryerson	W 102–68	3–0	Kerr Hall Gymnasium; Toronto, ON
Sep 1*; 12:00 p.m., no	at York	W 83–45	4–0	Tait McKenzie Centre; Toronto, ON
Nov 9*; 2:00 p.m., no	Bloomsburg	W 77–51	5–0	Bryce Jordan Center; University Park, PA
*Non-conference game. (#) Tournament seedings in parentheses.

=== Regular season and Postseason ===
Date time, TV	Rank^{#}	Opponent^{#}	Result	Record	Site (attendance) city, state
Nov 14*; 6:30 p.m., BTN		William & Mary	W 65–51	1–0	Bryce Jordan Center (8,026); University Park, PA
Nov 17*; 7:00 p.m., BTN		NJIT; Philly Hoop Group Classic	W 74–47	2–0	Bryce Jordan Center (5,293); University Park, PA
Nov 20*; 7:00 p.m., BTN.com		Hartford; Philly Hoop Group Classic	W 89–64	3–0	Bryce Jordan Center (5,142); University Park, PA
Nov 23*; 2:00 p.m., BTN		New Hampshire	W 70–50	4–0	Bryce Jordan Center (4,546); University Park, PA
Nov 25*; 7:30 p.m., CN8		vs. Penn	W 85–73	5–0	Palestra (4,581); Philadelphia, PA
Nov 28*; 6:30 p.m., CN8		vs. Rhode Island; Philly Hoop Group Classic semifinal	L 72–77	5–1	Palestra (5,000); Philadelphia, PA
Nov 29*; 6:30 p.m., CN8		vs. Towson; Philly Hoop Group Classic consolation game	W 78–54	6–1	Palestra (4,195); Philadelphia, PA
Dec 3*; 7:30 p.m., ESPN2		at Georgia Tech; ACC–Big Ten Challenge	W 85–83	7–1	Alexander Memorial Coliseum (7,900); Atlanta, GA
Dec 6*; 6:00 p.m., BTN		Temple	L 59–65	7–2	Bryce Jordan Center (9,833); University Park, PA
Dec 10*; 7:00 p.m., ESPNU		Army	W 60–45	8–2	Bryce Jordan Center (5,720); University Park, PA
Dec 13*; 4:00 p.m., BTN.com		Mount St. Mary's	W 61–56	9–2	Bryce Jordan Center (4,676); University Park, PA
Dec 21*; 4:00 p.m., ESPNU		Lafayette	W 83–55	10–2	Bryce Jordan Center (4,462); University Park, PA
Dec 23*; 7:00 p.m., BTN.com		Sacred Heart	W 73–65	11–2	Bryce Jordan Center (4,407); University Park, PA
Dec 31; 12:00 p.m., ESPN2		Northwestern	W 61–57	12–2 (1–0)	Bryce Jordan Center (5,525); University Park, PA
Jan 3; 2:00 p.m., BTN		at Wisconsin	L 61–65	12–3 (1–1)	Kohl Center (17,230); Madison, WI
Jan 6; 9:00 p.m., BTN		No. 14 Purdue	W 67–64	13–3 (2–1)	Bryce Jordan Center (4,404); University Park, PA
Jan 11; 3:30 p.m., BTN		at No. 22 Minnesota	L 59–79	13–4 (2–2)	Williams Arena (13,757); Minneapolis, MN
Jan 14; 6:30 p.m., BTN		No. 10 Michigan State	L 73–78	13–5 (2–3)	Bryce Jordan Center (10,270); University Park, PA
Jan 17; 6:00 p.m., BTN		at Indiana	W 65–55	14–5 (3–3)	Assembly Hall (15,626); Bloomington, IN
Jan 20; 9:00 p.m., BTN		Michigan	W 73–58	15–5 (4–3)	Bryce Jordan Center (8,730); University Park, PA
Jan 24; 6:00 p.m., BTN		Iowa	W 63–59	16–5 (5–3)	Bryce Jordan Center (12,210); University Park, PA
Feb 1; 12:00 p.m., BTN		at No. 9 Michigan State	W 72–68	17–5 (6–3)	Breslin Center (14,759); East Lansing, MI
Feb 5; 7:00 p.m., BTN		at Michigan	L 51–71	17–6 (6–4)	Crisler Arena (10,134); Ann Arbor, MI
Feb 8; 3:00 p.m., BTN		Wisconsin	L 44–54	17–7 (6–5)	Bryce Jordan Center (14,686); University Park, PA
Feb 11; 6:30 p.m., BTN		at No. 23 Purdue	L 47–61	17–8 (6–6)	Mackey Arena (14,013); West Lafayette, IN
Feb 14; 1:30 p.m., BTN		Minnesota	W 68–63	18–8 (7–6)	Bryce Jordan Center (12,148); University Park, PA
Feb 18; 7:00 p.m., BTN		at No. 16 Illinois	W 38–33	19–8 (8–6)	Assembly Hall (16,200); Champaign, IL
Feb 24; 7:00 p.m., ESPN		at Ohio State	L 59–73	19–9 (8–7)	Value City Arena (18,170); Columbus, OH
Feb 28; 6:00 p.m., BTN		Indiana	W 61–58	20–9 (9–7)	Bryce Jordan Center (15,035); University Park, PA
Mar 5; 9:00 p.m., ESPN		No. 23 Illinois	W 64–63	21–9 (10–7)	Bryce Jordan Center (13,091); University Park, PA
Mar 7; 2:00 p.m., BTN		at Iowa	L 69–75 ^{2OT}	21–10 (10–8)	Carver-Hawkeye Arena (14,094); Iowa City, IA
Big Ten tournament
Mar 12; 5:00 p.m., ESPN2		vs. Indiana; First round	W 66–51	22–10	Conseco Fieldhouse (12,174); Indianapolis, IN
Mar 13; 9:00 p.m., BTN		vs. No. 24 Purdue; Quarterfinal	L 65–79	22–11	Conseco Fieldhouse (14,647); Indianapolis, IN
National Invitation Tournament
Mar 17*; 8:00 p.m., ESPNU		George Mason; First round	W 77–73 ^{OT}	23–11	Bryce Jordan Center (5,549); University Park, PA
Mar 19*; 7:00 p.m., CN8		Rhode Island; Second round	W 83–72	24–11	Bryce Jordan Center (6,646); University Park, PA
Mar 24*; 9:00 p.m., ESPN		at Florida; Quarterfinal	W 71–62	25–11	O'Connell Center (6,525); Gainesville, FL
Mar 31*; 9:00 p.m., ESPN2		vs. Notre Dame; Semifinal	W 67–59	26–11	Madison Square Garden (11,352); New York, NY
Apr 2*; 7:00 p.m., ESPN		vs. Baylor; Championship game	W 69–63	27–11	Madison Square Garden (10,254); New York, NY
*Non-conference game. ^{#}Rankings from AP Poll. (#) Tournament seedings in parentheses.

== Awards ==
=== Players ===
- Talor Battle
  - Big Ten Player of the Week (Nov. 23)
  - All Big Ten first team point guard
- Jamelle Cornley
  - Big Ten Player of the Week (Jan. 26)
  - All Big Ten second team forward
  - 2009 NIT MVP

=== Coaches ===
- Ed DeChellis
  - Big Ten Coach of the Year
