= 2008–09 Iowa Hawkeyes men's basketball team =

American college basketball season

2008–09 Iowa Hawkeyes men's basketball
- Conference: Big Ten Conference
- Record: 15–17 (5–13 Big Ten)
- Head coach: Todd Lickliter (2nd season)
- Assistant coaches: Joel Cornette; LaVall Jordan; Chad Walthall
- Home arena: Carver-Hawkeye Arena; Capacity: 15,500

2008–09 Big Ten Conference men's basketball standings
| | Conf. | | | | Overall |
| Team | W | | L | PCT | W | | L | PCT |
|---|---|---|---|---|---|---|---|---|
| No. 8 Michigan State | 15 | – | 3 | .833 | 31 | – | 7 | .816 |
| No. 17 Purdue† | 11 | – | 7 | .611 | 27 | – | 10 | .730 |
| Illinois | 11 | – | 7 | .611 | 24 | – | 10 | .706 |
| Penn State | 10 | – | 8 | .556 | 27 | – | 11 | .711 |
| Ohio State | 10 | – | 8 | .556 | 22 | – | 11 | .667 |
| Wisconsin | 10 | – | 8 | .556 | 20 | – | 13 | .606 |
| Minnesota | 9 | – | 9 | .500 | 22 | – | 11 | .667 |
| Michigan | 9 | – | 9 | .500 | 21 | – | 14 | .600 |
| Northwestern | 8 | – | 10 | .444 | 17 | – | 14 | .548 |
| Iowa | 5 | – | 13 | .278 | 15 | – | 17 | .469 |
| Indiana | 1 | – | 17 | .056 | 6 | – | 25 | .194 |
† 2009 Big Ten tournament winner Rankings from AP poll

The 2008–09 Iowa Hawkeyes men's basketball team represented The University of Iowa in the 2008–09 college basketball season. The team was led by head coach Todd Lickliter. The team played their home games at Carver-Hawkeye Arena, which the team has done since 1983.

== Roster ==
| Name | # | Position | Height | Weight | Year | Home Town |
|---|---|---|---|---|---|---|
| Anthony Tucker | 1 | Guard | 6–4 | 200 | Freshman | Minnetonka, MN |
| David Palmer | 2 | Center | 6–9 | 240 | Junior | Antioch, TN |
| J.R. Angle | 4 | Guard | 6–7 | 215 | Senior | Franklin, IN |
| Matt Gatens | 5 | Guard | 6–5 | 215 | Freshman | Iowa City, IA |
| Devan Bawinkel | 15 | Guard | 6–5 | 210 | Junior | Winnebago, IL |
| Andrew Brommer | 20 | Forward | 6–9 | 235 | Freshman | Rosemount, MN |
| Jermain Davis | 23 | Guard | 6–4 | 200 | Junior | Plymouth, MN |
| Aaron Fuller | 24 | Forward | 6–6 | 210 | Freshman | Mesa, AZ |
| Jeff Peterson | 30 | Guard | 6–0 | 192 | Sophomore | Springfield, MO |
| Jake Kelly | 32 | Guard | 6–6 | 185 | Sophomore | Carmel, IN |
| John Lickliter | 34 | Guard | 5–11 | 175 | Freshman | Iowa City, IA |
| Cyrus Tate | 44 | Forward | 6–8 | 255 | Senior | Chicago, IL |
| Jarryd Cole | 50 | Forward | 6–7 | 250 | Sophomore | Kansas City, MO |

== Schedule and results ==
| Date time, TV | Rank^{#} | Opponent^{#} | Result | Record | Site (attendance) city, state |
Exhibition
| November 9, 2008*; 1:05 pm, Mediacom Connections/BTN.com | | Wayne State; Exhibition | W 59–36 | — | Carver-Hawkeye Arena; Iowa City, IA |
Regular season
| November 14, 2008*; 7:05 pm, Mediacom Connections/BTN.com | | Charleston Southern | W 68–48 | 1–0 | Carver-Hawkeye Arena (9,070); Iowa City, IA |
| November 17, 2008*; 7:05 pm, Mediacom Connections/BTN.com | | UTSA | W 73–67 | 2–0 | Carver-Hawkeye Arena (8,051); Iowa City, IA |
| November 20, 2008*; 6:05 pm | | at The Citadel | W 70–48 | 3–0 | McAlister Field House (2,024); Charleston, SC |
| November 23, 2008*; 5:05 pm, BTN | | Oakland; Las Vegas Invitiational | W 66–57 | 4–0 | Carver-Hawkeye Arena (8,079); Iowa City, IA |
| November 25, 2008*; 7:05 pm, Mediacom Connections/BTN.com | | Southeast Missouri State; Las Vegas Invitational | W 75–41 | 5–0 | Carver-Hawkeye Arena (8,184); Iowa City, IA |
| November 28, 2008*; 8:05 pm, Mediacom Connections/Big East Network | | vs. West Virginia; Las Vegas Invitational | L 68–87 | 5–1 | Orleans Arena (5,000); Las Vegas, NV |
| November 29, 2008*; 5:05 pm | | vs. Kansas State; Las Vegas Invitational | W 65–63 | 6–1 | Orleans Arena (5,500); Las Vegas, NV |
| December 2, 2008*; 6:05 pm, ESPNU | | at Boston College; ACC–Big Ten Challenge | L 55–57 | 6–2 | Conte Forum (4,084); Chestnut Hill, MA |
| December 8, 2008*; 7:35 pm, BTN | | Bryant | W 61–36 | 7–2 | Carver-Hawkeye Arena (8,711); Iowa City, IA |
| December 9, 2008*; 6:05 pm, ESPNU | | Northern Iowa; Iowa Big Four | W 65–46 | 8–2 | Carver-Hawkeye Arena (9,435); Iowa City, IA |
| December 12, 2008*; 7:05 pm, BTN | | Iowa State; Hy-Vee Cy-Hawk Series | W 73–57 | 9–2 | Carver-Hawkeye Arena (12,125); Iowa City, IA |
| December 20, 2008*; 3:05 pm, ESPNU | | at Drake; Iowa Big Four | L 43–60 | 9–3 | Knapp Center (7,152); Des Moines, IA |
| December 27, 2008*; 7:05 pm, ESPNU | | Western Illinois | W 58–43 | 10–3 | Carver-Hawkeye Arena (9,941); Iowa City, IA |
| December 31, 2008; 3:05 pm, BTN | | at No. 24 Ohio State | L 65–68 | 10–4 (0–1) | Value City Arena (14,946); Columbus, OH |
| January 3, 2009; 3:35 pm, BTN | | Indiana | W 65–60 | 11–4 (1–1) | Carver-Hawkeye Arena (11,161); Iowa City, IA |
| January 8, 2009; 6:05 pm, ESPN2 | | No. 22 Minnesota | L 49–52 | 11–5 (1–2) | Carver-Hawkeye Arena (9,663); Iowa City, IA |
| January 11, 2009; 10:30 am, BTN | | at Michigan | L 49–64 | 11–6 (1–3) | Crisler Arena (11,835); Ann Arbor, MI |
| January 18, 2009; 11:05 am, BTN | | at No. 19 Purdue | L 53–75 | 11–7 (1–4) | Mackey Arena (14,123); West Lafayette, IN |
| January 21, 2009; 7:35 pm, BTN | | Wisconsin | W 73–69 ^{OT} | 12–7 (2–4) | Carver-Hawkeye Arena (10,239); Iowa City, IA |
| January 24, 2009; 5:05 pm, BTN | | at Penn State | L 59–63 | 12–8 (2–5) | Bryce Jordan Center (12,210); State College, PA |
| January 29, 2009; 6:05 pm, ESPN | | No. 9 Michigan State | L 56–71 | 12–9 (2–6) | Carver-Hawkeye Arena (13,640); Iowa City, IA |
| February 1, 2009; 1:05 pm, BTN | | at No. 19 Illinois | L 54–62 | 12–10 (2–7) | Assembly Hall (16,618); Champaign, IL |
| February 4, 2009; 5:35 pm, BTN | | at Indiana | L 60–68 | 12–11 (2–8) | Assembly Hall (14,247); Bloomington, IN |
| February 7, 2009; 5:05 pm, BTN | | Northwestern | W 56–51 | 13–11 (3–8) | Carver-Hawkeye Arena (12,555); Iowa City, IA |
| February 11, 2009; 7:35 pm, BTN | | at Wisconsin | L 52–69 | 13–12 (3–9) | Kohl Center (17,230); Madison, WI |
| February 14, 2009; 3:05 pm, BTN | | No. 20 Purdue | L 45–49 | 13–13 (3–10) | Carver-Hawkeye Arena (14,665); Iowa City, IA |
| February 22, 2009; 4:05 pm, BTN | | Michigan | W 70–60 ^{OT} | 14–13 (4–10) | Carver-Hawkeye Arena (14,642); Iowa City, IA |
| February 25, 2009; 7:35 pm, BTN | | at No. 9 Michigan State | L 54–62 | 14–14 (4–11) | Breslin Student Events Center (14,759); East Lansing, MI |
| February 28, 2009; 1:05 pm, BTN | | at Northwestern | L 49–55 | 14–15 (4–12) | Welsh-Ryan Arena (6,473); Evanston, IL |
| March 3, 2009; 8:05 pm, BTN | | Ohio State | L 58–60 | 14–16 (4–13) | Carver-Hawkeye Arena (10,338); Iowa City, IA |
| March 7; 1:05 pm, BTN | | Penn State | W 75–67 ^{2OT} | 15–16 (5–13) | Carver-Hawkeye Arena (14,094); Iowa City, IA |
Big Ten tournament
| March 12, 2009; ESPN2 | (10) | vs. (7) Michigan; First Round | L 45–73 | 15–17 | Conseco Fieldhouse (N/A); Indianapolis, IN |
*Non-conference game. ^{#}Rankings from AP Poll. (#) Tournament seedings in parentheses. All times are in Central Time.
