= 2008–09 Ohio State Buckeyes men's basketball team =

American college basketball season

2008–09 Ohio State Buckeyes men's basketball

NCAA tournament, First round
- Conference: Big Ten
- Record: 22–11 (10–8 Big Ten)
- Head coach: Thad Matta
- Assistant coaches: Brandon Miller (1st season); Archie Miller; Alan Major
- Home arena: Value City Arena

2008–09 Big Ten Conference men's basketball standings
| | Conf. | | | | Overall |
| Team | W | | L | PCT | W | | L | PCT |
|---|---|---|---|---|---|---|---|---|
| No. 8 Michigan State | 15 | – | 3 | .833 | 31 | – | 7 | .816 |
| No. 17 Purdue† | 11 | – | 7 | .611 | 27 | – | 10 | .730 |
| Illinois | 11 | – | 7 | .611 | 24 | – | 10 | .706 |
| Penn State | 10 | – | 8 | .556 | 27 | – | 11 | .711 |
| Ohio State | 10 | – | 8 | .556 | 22 | – | 11 | .667 |
| Wisconsin | 10 | – | 8 | .556 | 20 | – | 13 | .606 |
| Minnesota | 9 | – | 9 | .500 | 22 | – | 11 | .667 |
| Michigan | 9 | – | 9 | .500 | 21 | – | 14 | .600 |
| Northwestern | 8 | – | 10 | .444 | 17 | – | 14 | .548 |
| Iowa | 5 | – | 13 | .278 | 15 | – | 17 | .469 |
| Indiana | 1 | – | 17 | .056 | 6 | – | 25 | .194 |
† 2009 Big Ten tournament winner Rankings from AP poll

The 2008–09 Ohio State Buckeyes men's basketball team represented Ohio State University. The head coach was Thad Matta, then in his fifth season with the Buckeyes. The team played its home games at Value City Arena in Columbus, Ohio as a member of the Big Ten Conference. The Buckeyes finished fourth in the conference's regular season, and was runner up in the Big Ten tournament, falling to Purdue 65–61 in the final game. In the NCAA tournament, the Buckeyes lost in the first round to the Siena Saints in double overtime.

== Roster ==
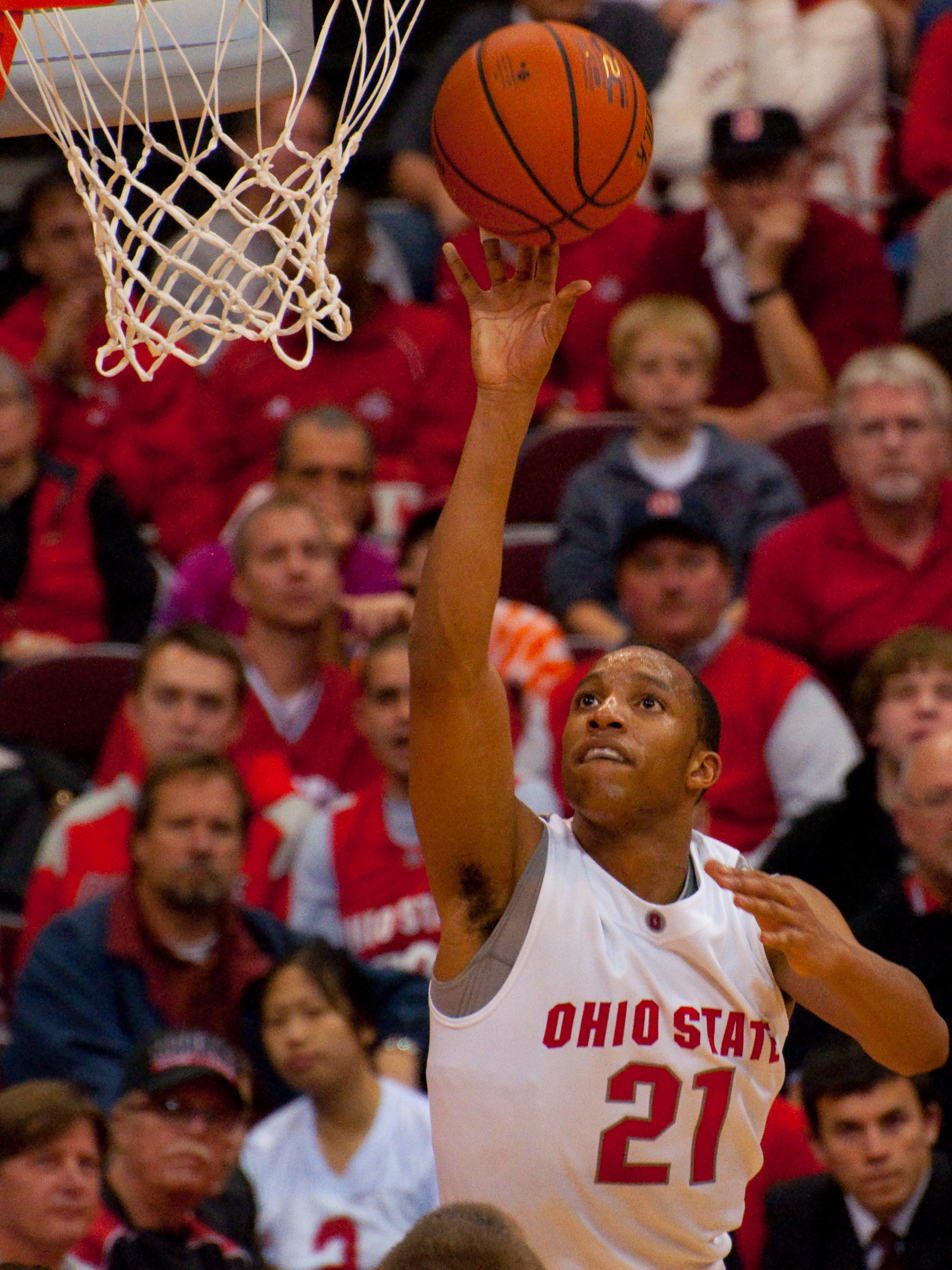
Evan Turner set new Big Ten records for number of career and single season Player of the Week awards during the 2009–10 Big Ten Conference men's basketball season.

| No. | Name | Ht. | Wt. | Position | Yr. | Hometown |
|---|---|---|---|---|---|---|
| 2 | Simmons, Jeremie | 6' 2" | 175 | Guard | Junior | Indianapolis, IN |
| 3 | Offutt, Walter | 6' 4" | 202 | Guard | Freshman | Indianapolis, IN |
| 4 | Hill, P.J. | 6' 1" | 170 | Guard | Junior | Minneapolis, MN |
| 10 | Crater, Anthony | 6' 1" | 170 | Guard | Freshman | Flint, MI |
| 13 | Peters, Danny | 6' 2" | 180 | Guard | Senior | New Albany, OH |
| 15 | Madsen, Kyle | 6' 10" | 250 | Center | Junior | Dublin, OH |
| 21 | Turner, Evan | 6' 7" | 210 | Guard | Sophomore | Chicago, IL |
| 23 | Lighty, David | 6' 5" | 220 | Guard | Junior | Cleveland, OH |
| 24 | Kecman, Nikola | 6' 8" | 220 | Forward | Sophomore | Belgrade, Serbia |
| 32 | Mullens, Byron | 7’0” | 275 | Center | Freshman | Columbus, OH |
| 33 | Diebler, Jon | 6' 6" | 205 | Guard | Sophomore | Upper Sandusky, OH |
| 34 | Titus, Mark | 6' 4" | 215 | Guard | Junior | Brownsburg, IN |
| 40 | Grycko, J.J. | 6' 9" | 210 | Forward | Freshman | Cincinnati, OH |
| 44 | Buford, William | 6' 6" | 220 | Guard | Freshman | Toledo, OH |
| 52 | Lauderdale, Dallas | 6' 8" | 255 | Forward | Sophomore | Solon, OH |

== 2008–09 Schedule ==
| Date time, TV | Rank^{#} | Opponent^{#} | Result | Record | Site (attendance) city, state |
Regular Season
| November 20*; 6:30 pm | | Delaware State | W 70–42 | 1–0 (0–0) | St. John Arena (6,388); Columbus, OH |
| November 24*; 8:00 pm, BTN | | Bowling Green | W 61–57 | 2–0 (0–0) | Schottenstein Center (12,751); Columbus, OH |
| November 29*; 12:00 pm, BTN | | Samford | W 59–22 | 3–0 (0–0) | Schottenstein Center (13,412); Columbus, OH |
| December 2*; 7:00 pm, ESPN | | at No. 21 Miami (FL) | W 73–68 | 4–0 (0–0) | BankUnited Center (5,870); Coral Gables, FL |
| December 6*; 4:00 pm, ESPNU | | vs. No. 7 Notre Dame | W 67–62 | 5–0 (0–0) | Lucas Oil Stadium (17,007); Indianapolis, IN |
| December 13*; 12:00 pm, BTN | No. 21 | Butler | W 54–51 | 6–0 (0–0) | Schottenstein Center (13,976); Columbus, OH |
| December 17*; 9:05 pm, ESPNU | No. 17 | Jacksonville | W 81–68 | 7–0 (0–0) | Schottenstein Center (12,250); Columbus, OH |
| December 20*; 12:00 pm, BTN | No. 17 | Iona | W 71–53 | 8–0 (0–0) | Schottenstein Center (14,029); Columbus, OH |
| December 22*; 7:00 pm, BTN | No. 15 | UNC Asheville | W 83–59 | 9–0 (0–0) | Schottenstein Center (13,317); Columbus, OH |
| December 27*; 4:00 pm, CBS | No. 15 | West Virginia | L 48–76 | 9–1 (0–0) | Schottenstein Center (19,049); Columbus, OH |
| December 31; 4:00 pm, BTN | No. 24 | Iowa | W 68–65 | 10–1 (1–0) | Schottenstein Center (14,946); Columbus, OH |
| January 3; 12:00 pm, BTN | No. 24 | at No. 21 Minnesota | L 59–68 | 10–2 (1–1) | Williams Arena (14,625); Minneapolis, MN |
| January 6; 7:00 pm, ESPN | | at No. 8 Michigan State | L 58–67 | 10–3 (1–2) | Breslin Student Events Center (14,759); East Lansing, MI |
| January 9*; 7:00 pm, BTN | | Houston Baptist | W 89–65 | 11–3 (1–2) | Schottenstein Center (15,081); Columbus, OH |
| January 13; 7:00 pm, ESPN | | Indiana | W 77–53 | 12–3 (2–2) | Schottenstein Center (15,661); Columbus, OH |
| January 17; 8:00 pm, BTN | | at No. 25 Michigan | W 65–58 | 13–3 (3–2) | Crisler Arena (13,751); Ann Arbor, MI |
| January 20; 6:00 pm, ESPN | | at No. 25 Illinois | L 49–67 | 13–4 (3–3) | Assembly Hall (15,549); Champagin, IL |
| January 25; 3:50 pm, CBS | | No. 7 Michigan State | L 67–78 | 13–5 (3–4) | Schottenstein Center (18,767); Columbus, OH |
| January 28; 6:30 pm, BTN | | Michigan | W 72–54 | 14–5 (4–4) | Schottenstein Center (16,363); Columbus, OH |
| January 31; 4:05 pm, ESPN2 | | at Indiana | W 93–81 | 15–5 (5–4) | Assembly Hall (17,202); Bloomington, IN |
| February 3; 7:00 pm, ESPN | | No. 12 Purdue | W 80–72 ^{OT} | 16–5 (6–4) | Schottenstein Center (17,012); Columbus, OH |
| February 7; 8:00 pm, BTN | | No. 19 Minnesota | W 64–58 | 17–5 (7–4) | Schottenstein Center (19,049); Columbus, OH |
| February 14; 8:00 pm, ESPN | No. 24 | at Wisconsin; ESPN College GameDay | L 50–55 | 17–6 (7–5) | Kohl Center (17,230); Madison, WI |
| February 18; 8:00 pm, BTN | | at Northwestern | L 69–72 | 17–7 (7–6) | Welsh-Ryan Arena (4,312); Evanston, IL |
| February 22; 1:00 pm, CBS | | No. 18 Illinois | L 68–70 | 17–8 (7–7) | Schottenstein Center (19,049); Columbus, OH |
| February 24; 7:00 pm, ESPN | | Penn State | W 73–59 | 18–8 (8–7) | Schottenstein Center (18,170); Columbus, OH |
| February 28; 4:00 pm, ESPN | | at No. 16 Purdue | L 50–75 | 18–9 (8–8) | Mackey Arena (14,123); West Lafayette, IN |
| March 3; 8:05 pm, BTN | | at Iowa | W 60–58 | 19–9 (9–8) | Carver-Hawkeye Arena (10,338); Iowa City, IA |
| March 8; 5:00 pm, BTN | | Northwestern | W 52–47 | 20–9 (10–8) | Schottenstein Center (19,049); Columbus, OH |
Big Ten tournament
| March 13; 2:30 pm, ESPN | | vs. Wisconsin | W 61–57 | 21–9 (10–8) | Conseco Fieldhouse (13,023); Indianapolis, IN |
| March 14; 1:40 pm, CBS | | vs. No. 7 Michigan State | W 82–70 | 22–9 (10–8) | Conseco Fieldhouse (15,728); Indianapolis, IN |
| March 15; 3:30 pm, CBS | | vs. No. 24 Purdue | L 61–65 | 22–10 (10–8) | Conseco Fieldhouse (12,526); Indianapolis, IN |
NCAA Tournament
| March 20; 9:40 pm, CBS | | vs. (9) Siena | L 72–74 ^{2OT} | 22–11 (10–8) | University of Dayton Arena (12,596); Dayton, OH |
*Non-conference game. ^{#}Rankings from AP Poll. (#) Tournament seedings in parentheses.

== Rankings ==
Ranking movements Legend: ██ Increase in ranking ██ Decrease in ranking — = Not ranked
| | Week | | | | | | | | | | | | | | | | | | | |
| Poll | Pre | 1 | 2 | 3 | 4 | 5 | 6 | 7 | 8 | 9 | 10 | 11 | 12 | 13 | 14 | 15 | 16 | 17 | 18 | Final |
|---|---|---|---|---|---|---|---|---|---|---|---|---|---|---|---|---|---|---|---|---|
| AP | — | — | — | — | 21 | 17 | 14 | 24 | — | | | | | | | | | | | Not released |
| Coaches | — | — | — | — | 21 | 16 | 13 | 23 | — | | | | | | | | | | | |
