= 2008–09 Wisconsin Badgers men's basketball team =

American college basketball season

2008–09 Wisconsin Badgers men's basketball

NCAA tournament, Round of 32
- Conference: Big Ten Conference
- Record: 20–13 (10–8 Big Ten)
- Head coach: Bo Ryan
- Associate head coach: Greg Gard
- Assistant coaches: Gary Close; Howard Moore
- Home arena: Kohl Center

2008–09 Big Ten Conference men's basketball standings
	Conf.				Overall
Team	W		L	PCT	W		L	PCT
No. 8 Michigan State	15	–	3	.833	31	–	7	.816
No. 17 Purdue†	11	–	7	.611	27	–	10	.730
Illinois	11	–	7	.611	24	–	10	.706
Penn State	10	–	8	.556	27	–	11	.711
Ohio State	10	–	8	.556	22	–	11	.667
Wisconsin	10	–	8	.556	20	–	13	.606
Minnesota	9	–	9	.500	22	–	11	.667
Michigan	9	–	9	.500	21	–	14	.600
Northwestern	8	–	10	.444	17	–	14	.548
Iowa	5	–	13	.278	15	–	17	.469
Indiana	1	–	17	.056	6	–	25	.194
† 2009 Big Ten tournament winner Rankings from AP poll

The 2008–09 Wisconsin Badgers men's basketball team represented the University of Wisconsin–Madison. The head coach was Bo Ryan, coaching his eighth season with the Badgers. The team played its home games at the Kohl Center in Madison, Wisconsin, and was a member of the Big Ten Conference.

== Awards ==
All-Big Ten by Media

- Marcus Landry – 3rd team
- Trevon Hughes – Honorable mentioned
- Joe Krabbenhoft – Honorable mentioned

All-Big Ten by Coaches

- Marcus Landry – 2nd team
- Trevon Hughes – Honorable mentioned

== Roster ==
No.	Name	Position	Ht.	Wt.	Year	Hometown/High School
40	Jared Berggren	F/C	6–10	240	FR	Princeton, Minnesota / Princeton HS
12	Jason Bohannon	G	6–2	195	JR	Marion, Iowa / Linn-Mar HS
21	Morris Cain	G	6–5	185	SR	Glendale, Wisconsin / Nicolet HS
5	Ryan Evans	G/F	6–6	210	FR	Phoenix, Arizona / Hamilton HS
44	J.P. Gavinski	C	6–11	250	RS SO	Wisconsin Dells, Wisconsin / Wisconsin Dells HS
3	Trevon Hughes	G	6–0	195	JR	Queens, New York / St. John's NW Academy
24	Tim Jarmusz	F/G	6–6	208	SO	Oshkosh, Wisconsin / West HS
45	Joe Krabbenhoft	F/G	6–6	217	SR	Sioux Falls, South Dakota / Roosevelt HS
1	Marcus Landry	F	6–7	215	SR	Milwaukee, Wisconsin / Vincent HS
30	Jon Leuer	F	6–10	230	SO	Orono, Minnesota / Orono HS
50	Ian Markolf	C	7–0	255	FR	San Antonio, Texas / Churchill HS
52	Keaton Nankivil	F	6–8	245	SO	Madison, Wisconsin / Memorial HS
2	Wquinton Smith	G	5–11	205	SO	Milwaukee, Wisconsin / Rufus King HS
11	Jordan Taylor	G	6–1	195	FR	Bloomington, Minnesota / Benilde-St. Margaret's
15	Brett Valentyn	G	6–4	192	RS SO	Verona, Wisconsin / Verona HS
33	Rob Wilson	G/F	6–3	200	FR	Cleveland, Ohio / Garfield HS

== 2008–09 schedule and results ==
- All times are Central

Date time, TV	Rank^{#}	Opponent^{#}	Result	Record	High points	High rebounds	High assists	Site (attendance) city, state
Regular Season
11/16/2008*; 3:00pm	No. 21	Long Beach State	W 68–61	1–0	23 – Landry	6 – Krabbenhoft	3 – Tied	Kohl Center (17,230); Madison, WI
11/18/2008*; 7:30pm	No. 22	SIU Edwardsville	W 88–58	2–0	19 – Leuer	6 – Jarmusz	5 – Krabbenhoft	Kohl Center (17,230); Madison, WI
11/21/2008*; 7:30pm	No. 22	vs. Iona; Paradise Jam Tournament	W 60–58	3–0	21 – Hughes	8 – Nankivil	2 – Hughes	Virgin Islands Sports and Fitness Center (3,095); Saint Thomas, U.S. Virgin Islands
11/23/2008*; 7:30pm	No. 22	vs. San Diego; Paradise Jam Tournament	W 64–49	4–0	22 – Hughes	7 – Landry	6 – Landry	Virgin Islands Sports and Fitness Center (3,271); Saint Thomas, U.S. Virgin Islands
11/24/2008*; 7:30pm	No. 19	vs. No. 2 Connecticut; Paradise Jam Tournament	L 57–76	4–1	11 – Nankivil	6 – Krabbenhoft	3 – Krabbenhoft	Virgin Islands Sport & Fitness Center (3,691); Saint Thomas, U.S. Virgin Islands
11/29/2008*; 11:00am	No. 19	UW–Milwaukee	W 67–46	5–1	16 – Hughes	10 – Krabbenhoft	3 – Krabbenhoft	Kohl Center (17,230); Madison, WI
12/1/2008*; 6:00pm	No. 22	at Virginia Tech; Big Ten – ACC Challenge	W 74–72	6–1	18 – Landry	6 – Leuer	4 – Tied	Cassell Coliseum (9,847); Blacksburg, VA
12/6/2008*; 8:30pm	No. 22	at Marquette	L 58–61	6–2	14 – Hughes	7 – Krabbenhoft	3 – Tied	Bradley Center (18,895); Milwaukee, WI
12/9/2008*; 7:30pm		Idaho State	W 60–58	7–2	18 – Bohannon	9 – Krabbenhoft	4 – Hughes	Kohl Center (17,230); Madison, WI
12/13/2008*; 7:00pm		UW–Green Bay	W 77–57	8–2	15 – Krabbenhoft	11 – Nankivil	4 – Hughes	Kohl Center (17,230); Madison, WI
12/20/2008*; 5:00pm		Coppin State	W 57–46	9–2	16 – Leuer	8 – Krabbenhoft	4 – Tied	Kohl Center (17,230); Madison, WI
12/23/2008*; 8:30pm		No. 8 Texas	L 69–74	9–3	18 – Hughes	4 – 3 players tied	3 – Hughes	Kohl Center (17,230); Madison, WI
12/31/2008; 1:00pm		at No. 24 Michigan	W 73–61	10–3 (1–0)	16 – Tied	8 – Krabbenhoft	3 – 3 players tied	Crisler Arena (11,046); Ann Arbor, MI
1/3/2009; 1:00pm		Penn State	W 65–61	11–3 (2–0)	23 – Landry	10 – Krabbenhoft	5 – Krabbenhoft	Kohl Center (17,230); Madison, WI
1/7/2009; 7:30 pm		Northwestern	W 74–45	12–3 (3–0)	20 – Bohannon	8 – Tied	5 – Bohannon	Kohl Center (17,230); Madison, WI
1/11/2009; 12:30pm, CBS		at No. 14 Purdue	L 52–65	12–4 (3–1)	13 – Krabbenhoft	7 – Krabbenhoft	3 – Tied	Mackey Arena (14,123); West Lafayette, IN
1/15/2009; 8:00pm		No. 17 Minnesota	L 74–78	12–5 (3–2)	18 – Landry	8 – Leuer	5 – Hughes	Kohl Center (17,230); Madison, WI
1/21/2009; 7:35pm		at Iowa	L 69–73	12–6 (3–3)	13 – Landry	8 – Landry	3 – Taylor	Carver-Hawkeye Arena (10,239); Iowa City, IA
1/24/2009; 3:00pm		at No. 24 Illinois	L 57–64	12–7 (3–4)	16 – Krabbenhoft	12 – Krabbenhoft	3 – 3 players tied	Assembly Hall (16,618); Champaign, IL
1/27/2009; 8:00pm		No. 17 Purdue	L 63–64	12–8 (3–5)	21 – Nankivil	6 – Krabbenhoft	5 – Hughes	Kohl Center (17,230); Madison, WI
1/31/2009; 7:00pm		at Northwestern	L 63–66	12–9 (3–6)	15 – Hughes	6 – Landry	4 – Krabbenhoft	Welsh-Ryan Arena (8,117); Evanston, IL
2/5/2009; 8:00pm		No. 21 Illinois	W 63–50	13–9 (4–6)	20 – Bohannon	6 – Tied	5 – Krabbenhoft	Kohl Center (17,230); Madison, WI
2/8/2009; 2:00pm		at Penn State	W 54–44	14–9 (5–6)	13 – Landry	7 – Krabbenhoft	4 – Hughes	Bryce Jordan Center (14,686); University Park, PA
2/11/2009; 7:30pm		Iowa	W 69–52	15–9 (6–6)	16 – Krabbenhoft	8 – Leuer	6 – Hughes	Kohl Center (17,230); Madison, WI
2/14/2009; 8:00pm, ESPN		Ohio State; ESPN College GameDay	W 55–50	16–9 (7–6)	17 – Landry	8 – Krabbenhoft	5 – Krabbenhoft	Kohl Center (17,230); Madison, WI
2/19/2009; 8:00pm		at Indiana	W 68–51	17–9 (8–6)	21 – Hughes	5 – Tied	4 – Hughes	Assembly Hall (14,669); Bloomington, IN
2/22/2009; 2:00pm		at No. 5 Michigan State	L 50–61	17–10 (8–7)	12 – Hughes	5 – Nankivil	3 – Hughes	Jack Breslin Student Events Center (14,759); East Lansing, MI
3/1/2009; 1:00pm		Michigan	W 60–55	18–10 (9–7)	19 – Hughes	11 – Krabbenhoft	5 – Landry	Kohl Center (17,230); Madison, WI
3/4/2009; 7:30pm		at Minnesota	L 46–51	18–11 (9–8)	18 – Landry	9 – Krabbenhoft	4 – Hughes	Williams Arena (14,625); Minneapolis, MN
3/8/2009; 6:00pm		Indiana	W 85–61	19–11 (10–8)	19 – Krabbenhoft	9 – Krabbenhoft	6 – Landry	Kohl Center (17,230); Madison, WI
Big Ten tournament
3/13/2009; 1:30pm		vs. Ohio State; Quarterfinals	L 57–61	19–12	15 – Hughes	10 – Krabbenhoft	4 – Leuer	Conseco Fieldhouse (13,023); Indianapolis, IN
NCAA Tournament
3/20/2009*; 8:55pm, CBS	No. (12)	vs. No. (5) Florida State; First Round	W 61–59 ^{OT}	20–12	16 – Bohannon	6 – Krabbenhoft	4 – Hughes	Taco Bell Arena (12,194); Boise, ID
3/22/2009*; 1:20pm, CBS	No. (12)	vs. No. (4) Xavier; Second Round	L 49–60	20–13	18 – Landry	10 – Landry	2 – Taylor	Taco Bell Arena (N/A); Boise, ID
*Non-conference game. ^{#}Rankings from AP Poll. (#) Tournament seedings in parentheses.

== Rankings ==
Ranking movements Legend: ██ Increase in ranking ██ Decrease in ranking — = Not ranked т = Tied with team above or below
	Week																			
Poll	Pre	1	2	3	4	5	6	7	8	9	10	11	12	13	14	15	16	17	18	Final
AP	25	25	25	—																Not released
Coaches	21 т	22	19	22 т	—															
