= 2008–09 Northwestern Wildcats men's basketball team =

American college basketball season

2008–09 Northwestern Wildcats men's basketball

NIT, First Round
- Conference: Big Ten Conference
- Record: 17–14 (8–10 Big Ten)
- Head coach: Bill Carmody (9th season)
- Assistant coach: Tavaras Hardy (1st season)
- Home arena: Welsh-Ryan Arena

2008–09 Big Ten Conference men's basketball standings
| | Conf. | | | | Overall |
| Team | W | | L | PCT | W | | L | PCT |
|---|---|---|---|---|---|---|---|---|
| No. 8 Michigan State | 15 | – | 3 | .833 | 31 | – | 7 | .816 |
| No. 17 Purdue† | 11 | – | 7 | .611 | 27 | – | 10 | .730 |
| Illinois | 11 | – | 7 | .611 | 24 | – | 10 | .706 |
| Penn State | 10 | – | 8 | .556 | 27 | – | 11 | .711 |
| Ohio State | 10 | – | 8 | .556 | 22 | – | 11 | .667 |
| Wisconsin | 10 | – | 8 | .556 | 20 | – | 13 | .606 |
| Minnesota | 9 | – | 9 | .500 | 22 | – | 11 | .667 |
| Michigan | 9 | – | 9 | .500 | 21 | – | 14 | .600 |
| Northwestern | 8 | – | 10 | .444 | 17 | – | 14 | .548 |
| Iowa | 5 | – | 13 | .278 | 15 | – | 17 | .469 |
| Indiana | 1 | – | 17 | .056 | 6 | – | 25 | .194 |
† 2009 Big Ten tournament winner Rankings from AP poll

The 2008–09 Northwestern Wildcats men's basketball team represented Northwestern University in the 2008–09 college basketball season. This was head coach Bill Carmody's ninth season at Northwestern. The Wildcats are members of the Big Ten Conference and played their home games at Welsh-Ryan Arena. They finished the season 17–14, 8–10 in Big Ten play, lost in the first round of the 2009 Big Ten Conference men's basketball tournament and were invited to the 2009 National Invitation Tournament where they lost in the first round to the University of Tulsa. Northwestern matched their school record for most wins in a season and recorded their first post-season appearance since 1999.

== Schedule and results ==
| Date time, TV | Rank^{#} | Opponent^{#} | Result | Record | Site city, state |
Regular season
| Nov 16, 2008*; BTN.com | | Central Arkansas | W 81–39 | 1–0 | Welsh-Ryan Arena; Evanston, IL |
| Nov 19, 2008*; BTN.com | | Texas A&M-CC | W 66–48 | 2–0 | Welsh-Ryan Arena; Evanston, IL |
| Nov 22, 2008* | | at Brown | W 73–64 | 3–0 | Pizzitola Sports Center; Providence, RI |
| Nov 26, 2008* | | at Butler | L 53–57 | 3–1 | Hinkle Fieldhouse; Indianapolis, IN |
| Dec 1, 2008*; BTN.com | | UC Riverside | W 59–43 | 4–1 | Welsh-Ryan Arena; Evanston, IL |
| Dec 3, 2008*; ESPN2 | | Florida State | W 73–59 | 5–1 | Welsh-Ryan Arena; Evanston, IL |
| Dec 6, 2008*; BTN | | DePaul | W 63–36 | 6–1 | Welsh-Ryan Arena; Evanston, IL |
| Dec 15, 2008*; BTN | | UMKC | W 77–62 | 7–1 | Welsh-Ryan Arena; Evanston, IL |
| Dec 20, 2008* | | at Stanford | L 59–65 | 7–2 | Maples Pavilion; Stanford, CA |
| Dec 23, 2008*; BTN | | SMU | W 66–55 | 8–2 | Welsh-Ryan Arena; Evanston, IL |
| Dec 31, 2008; ESPN2 | | at Penn State | L 57–61 | 8–3 (0-1) | Bryce Jordan Center; University Park, PA |
| Jan 3, 2009; BTN | | No. 10 Michigan State | L 66–77 | 8–4 (0-2) | Welsh-Ryan Arena; Evanston, IL |
| Jan 7, 2009; BTN | | at Wisconsin | L 45–74 | 8–5 (0-3) | Kohl Center; Madison, WI |
| Jan 15, 2009; ESPN2 | | No. 19 Purdue | L 61–63 | 8–6 (0-4) | Welsh-Ryan Arena; Evanston, IL |
| Jan 18, 2009; BTN | | No. 18 Minnesota | W 74–65 | 9–6 (1-4) | Welsh-Ryan Arena; Evanston, IL |
| Jan 21, 2009; BTN | | at No. 7 Michigan State | W 70–63 | 10–6 (2-4) | Breslin Center; East Lansing, MI |
| Jan 24, 2009; BTN | | at Michigan | L 59–68 | 10–7 (2-5) | Crisler Arena; Ann Arbor, MI |
| Jan 28, 2009; BTN | | Indiana | W 77–75 | 11–7 (3-5) | Welsh-Ryan Arena; Evanston, IL |
| Jan 31, 2009; BTN | | Wisconsin | W 66–63 | 12–7 (4-5) | Welsh-Ryan Arena; Evanston, IL |
| Feb 4, 2009*; BTN.com | | Chicago State | W 75–63 | 13–7 | Welsh-Ryan Arena; Evanston, IL |
| Feb 7, 2009; BTN | | at Iowa | L 51–56 | 13–8 (4-6) | Carver-Hawkeye Arena; Iowa City, IA |
| Feb 12, 2009; ESPN2 | | No. 22 Illinois | L 59–60 | 13–9 (4-7) | Welsh-Ryan Arena; Evanston, IL |
| Feb 15, 2009; BTN | | Michigan | L 67–70 ^{OT} | 13–10 (4-8) | Welsh-Ryan Arena; Evanston, IL |
| Feb 18, 2009; BTN | | Ohio State | W 72–69 | 14–10 (5-8) | Welsh-Ryan Arena; Evanston, IL |
| Feb 22, 2009; BTN | | at Minnesota | L 45–72 | 14–11 (5-9) | Williams Arena; Minneapolis, MN |
| Feb 25, 2009; BTN | | at Indiana | W 75–53 | 15–11 (6-9) | Assembly Hall; Bloomington, IN |
| Feb 28, 2009; BTN | | Iowa | W 55–49 | 16–11 (7-9) | Welsh-Ryan Arena; Evanston, IL |
| Mar 4, 2009; BTN | | at No. 19 Purdue | W 64–61 | 17–11 (8-9) | Mackey Arena; West Lafayette, IN |
| Mar 8, 2009; BTN | | at Ohio State | L 47–52 | 17–12 (8-10) | Schottenstein Center; Columbus, OH |
Big Ten tournament
| Mar 12, 2009; BTN | | vs. Minnesota | L 53–66 | 17–13 (8-10) | Conseco Fieldhouse; Indianapolis, IN |
NIT
| Mar 18, 2009; ESPNU | | at Tulsa | L 59–68 | 17–14 (8-10) | Reynolds Center; Tulsa, OK |
*Non-conference game. ^{#}Rankings from AP Poll. (#) Tournament seedings in parentheses.
