= Chester Frazier =

American college basketball coach (born 1986)

Virginia Tech Hokies
- Title: Associate head coach
- League: Atlantic Coast Conference

Personal information
- Born: April 14, 1986 (age 40) Baltimore, Maryland, U.S.
- Listed height: 6 ft 2 in (1.88 m)
- Listed weight: 195 lb (88 kg)

Career information
- High school: Notre Dame Prep (Fitchburg, Massachusetts); Lake Clifton Eastern (Baltimore, Maryland)
- College: Illinois (2005–2009)
- NBA draft: 2009: undrafted
- Playing career: 2009–2012
- Position: Point guard
- Coaching career: 2010–present

Career history

Playing
- 2009–2010: BG Göttingen
- 2011–2012: s.Oliver Baskets

Coaching
- 2010–2011: Illinois (GA)
- 2012–2019: Kansas State (assistant)
- 2019–2021: Virginia Tech (associate head coach)
- 2021–2024: Illinois (assistant)
- 2024–2025: West Virginia (associate head coach)
- 2025–present: Virginia Tech (associate head coach)

Career highlights
- As player: FIBA EuroChallenge champion (2010); All-Big Ten Honorable Mention (Media) (2009); 2× Big Ten All Defensive Team – (2007, 2009)

Chester Frazier (born April 14, 1986) is an American college basketball coach from Baltimore, Maryland currently serving as an associate head coach at Virginia Tech.

== Playing career ==
Frazier played four seasons at the University of Illinois (2005–09), under head coach Bruce Weber, earning honorable mention All-Big Ten and Big Ten All-Defensive Team honors. He earned a bachelor's degree in recreation management from Illinois in 2009.

== Coaching career ==
Frazier joined his former head coach Bruce Weber as an assistant in 2012 when Weber was announced as head coach of Kansas State University. He helped Kansas State make five NCAA Tournament appearances including a spot in the Elite Eight in 2018 and a share of two big 12 regular season conference championships.

Frazier joined Virginia Tech in 2019 when Mike Young was announced as head coach of Virginia Tech.

In 2021, Frazier returned to the University of Illinois as an assistant coach. After three years at Illinois, Frazier joined West Virginia's coaching staff. After one year at West Virginia, Frazier returned to Virginia Tech as the associate head coach.

== Personal life ==
Frazier earned his bachelor's degree in recreation management. He is married with two children.
