= Kevin Coble =

American basketball player

Personal information
- Born: November 9, 1987 (age 38) Greensboro, North Carolina, U.S.
- Listed height: 6 ft 8 in (2.03 m)
- Listed weight: 220 lb (100 kg)

Career information
- High school: Scottsdale Christian Academy (Scottsdale, Arizona)
- College: Northwestern (2006–2009)
- NBA draft: 2010: undrafted
- Playing career: 2012–2013
- Position: Forward

Career history
- 2012: Fort Wayne Mad Ants
- 2012–2013: Sendai 89ers

Career highlights
- Second-team All-Big Ten (2009)

Kevin Randolph Coble (born November 9, 1987) is an American professional basketball player who last played for the Sendai 89ers of the bj league. A former member of the Northwestern Wildcats basketball team, he led them in scoring and rebounding as a freshman, sophomore and junior during the 2006–07, 2007–08 and 2008–09 seasons, but suffered a Lisfranc fracture and redshirted during his true senior season. Following the 2008–09 All-Big Ten Conference regular season, he was named a second-team All-conference selection by both the coaches and the media. He was also named Big Ten men's basketball player of the week during the season. He was an honorable mention All-Big Ten selection following the 2007–08 Big Ten Conference men's basketball season. On July 27, 2010, Coble decided not to play basketball for his senior year, choosing instead to focus on graduating in December 2010.

== Professional career ==
Coble joined the Fort Wayne Mad Ants in February 2012. The team released him on March 13. In September 2012, Coble signed with the Sendai 89ers of the Japanese BJ-League.
