= Mike Davis (basketball, born 1988) =

American basketball player

Personal information
- Born: October 21, 1988 (age 38) Alexandria, Virginia
- Listed height: 6 ft 9 in (2.06 m)
- Listed weight: 225 lb (102 kg)

Career information
- High school: T. C. Williams (Alexandria, Virginia)
- College: Illinois (2007–2011)
- NBA draft: 2011: undrafted
- Playing career: 2011–2019
- Position: Power forward / small forward

Career history
- 2011–2012: BC Ferro-ZNTU
- 2012–2013: Sioux Falls Skyforce
- 2013: Maratonistas de Coamo
- 2013–2014: BC Kyiv
- 2014: Metros de Santiago
- 2014–2015: Adanaspor
- 2015–2016: Best Balıkesir
- 2016–2017: Westchester Knicks
- 2018–2019: Capital City Go-Go

Career highlights
- Second-team All-Big Ten – Coaches (2009); Third-team team All-Big Ten – Media (2009); 2× Honorable mention All-Big Ten (2010, 2011)

Michael Edward Davis (born October 21, 1988) is an American former professional basketball player. He played college basketball for Illinois.

== High school career ==
Davis attended T. C. Williams High School under coach Ivan Thomas. As a senior, he averaged 17.3 points, 9.0 rebounds and 3.5 blocks helping T. C. Williams to reach a 25–4 record, Region and Patriot District titles and the quarterfinals of the Virginia Group AAA state tournament. For that he won the Northern Region Player of the Year award and a second-team All-Metro selection by the Washington Post.

== College career ==
After graduating high school, Davis attended Illinois. In his senior season, he was the only Illini to start all 34 games where he averaged 12.5 points, 7.2 rebounds and 1.7 assists in 33 minutes, being second in the team in scoring.

When he graduated, he was second on Illinois' all-time rebounding list with 909 boards, No. 22 on Illini all-time scoring list with 1,279 points and third in school history in games played with 138.

=== College statistics ===
College	Year	GP	MIN	SPG	BPG	RPG	APG	PPG	FG%	FT%	3P%
Illinois	2007–08	34	10.4	0.2	0.41	1.79	0.3	2.6	.439	.469	.000
Illinois	2008–09	34	30.8	0.7	0.65	8.09	1.9	11.2	.533	.683	.000
Illinois	2009–10	36	32.2	0.5	0.64	9.17	0.9	10.7	.473	.631	.000
Illinois	2010–11	34	33.0	0.9	0.76	7.15	1.6	12.5	.529	.706	.000

== Professional career ==
After going undrafted in the 2011 NBA draft, Davis signed with BC Ferro-ZNTU of the Ukrainian SuperLeague on August 3, 2011. In 31 games, he averaged 11.2 points, 8.4 rebounds, 1.8 assists and 0.8 blocks in 28.2 minutes.

In November, 2012, Davis was selected with the 5th overall pick of the 2012 NBA Development League draft by the Reno Bighorns and was traded later to the Sioux Falls Skyforce. In 49 games, he averaged 7.4 points, 6.2 rebounds, 1.1 assists and 0.8 steals in 23.1 minutes. Later, he joined the Maratonistas de Coamo of Puerto Rico, where he averaged 12.1 points, 7.8 rebounds and 1.1 assists in seven games.

On August 30, 2013, Davis signed with BC Kyiv where he averaged 15.1 points and 6.6 rebounds in Superleague and 10.7 points and 8.7 rebounds in Eurochallenge. On February 27, 2014, Davis was waived by Kyiv. On May 3, Davis signed with Metros de Santiago of Dominican Republic.

In July, 2014, Davis signed with Adanaspor of the Turkish Basketball First League. In 36 games, he averaged 20.7 points, 9.2 rebounds, 2.2 assists, 0.9 steals and 0.8 blocks in 35.6 minutes.

In July, 2015, Davis signed with Best Balıkesir of the Turkish Basketball First League, where he averaged 14.3 points, 9.7 rebounds, 1.6 assists, 0.9 steals and 0.9 blocks in 32.1 minutes.

On November 30, 2016, Davis was acquired by the Westchester Knicks. On December 10, he made his debut for the Knicks in a 105–94 loss to the Oklahoma City Blue, recording three rebounds in 11 minutes off the bench. On February 28, 2017, he was waived by the Knicks.

For the 2017–18 season, Davis was added to the training camp roster of the Capital City Go-Go of the NBA G League. On November 5, 2018, Davis was waived by the Capital City Go-Go.

== Personal life ==
The son of Steven and Tangie Davis, he has a sister. He majored in recreation, sport and tourism-sport management.
