= Damian Johnson (basketball) =

American basketball player (born 1987)

Personal information
- Born: March 9, 1987 (age 39) Thibodaux, Louisiana
- Listed height: 6 ft 7 in (2.01 m)
- Listed weight: 205 lb (93 kg)

Career information
- High school: Thibodaux (Thibodaux, Louisiana)
- College: Minnesota (2006–2010)
- NBA draft: 2010: undrafted
- Playing career: 2010–2016
- Position: Power forward

Career history
- 2010–2011: Oita Heat Devils
- 2011: Bakersfield Jam
- 2011–2012: Springfield Armor
- 2014–2015: Mount Gambier Pioneers
- 2016: Bendigo Braves

Career highlights
- 3× SEABL champion (2014–2016); 2× SEABL Defensive Player of the Year (2015, 2016); 2× All-SEABL Team (2015, 2016); Big Ten All-Defensive Team (2009)

Damian Johnson (born March 9, 1987) is an American former professional basketball player. He played four years of college basketball for Minnesota and spent the first two years of his professional career in Japan and the NBA Development League. Upon moving to Australia in 2014, he made a name for himself in the South East Australian Basketball League (SEABL). Over three seasons in the SEABL, Johnson was a champion every year and won back-to-back Defensive Player of the Year honours in 2015 and 2016.

== High school career ==
Johnson attended Thibodaux High School in Thibodaux, Louisiana. He was an All-state performer in Louisiana as a senior and was the All-Bayou Region Player of the Year that same year. Johnson was also selected as the best defensive player in his conference during his last three years of high school.

== College career ==
Coming out of Louisiana in 2005, Johnson redshirted his first season with Minnesota, joining the Golden Gophers for the 2006–07 season. After playing sparingly as a freshman, Johnson sprung up the depth charts as a sophomore and averaged 7.1 points in 22.6 minutes per game. As a junior in 2008–09, he averaged 9.8 points, 4.2 rebounds, 1.6 assists, 1.9 steals and 2.0 blocks per game in 30 games. As a senior in 2009–10, he averaged 9.9 points, 4.3 rebounds, 2.3 assists, 1.8 steals and 1.9 blocks per game in 35 games. Johnson played in 127 games for Minnesota and finished his career second on the Gophers' all-time steals list with 195 and third on the Gophers' all-time blocks list with 191. His 64 steals as a senior tied him for fifth place on the Gophers' single-season list. He came into 2009–10 season with the 11th and 12th place spots on the steals list with 59 steals and 58 steals, respectively, in his sophomore and junior seasons. He rejected 60 shots as a junior, ninth-most in program history, and followed that up with 67 blocks as a senior, seventh all-time. The Gophers played in three-straight post-seasons in Johnson's final three seasons. He finished his career with averages of 7.3 points, 3.8 rebounds, 1.5 blocks, 1.5 steals and 21.6 minutes per game.

== Professional career ==
After going undrafted in the 2010 NBA draft, Johnson spent time with the Miami Heat and the Minnesota Timberwolves during the 2010 NBA Summer League. In August 2010, he signed with the Oita Heat Devils for the 2010–11 bj league season. In 47 games for Oita, he averaged 15.9 points, 8.7 rebounds, 2.9 assists, 1.8 steals and 1.5 blocks per game.

In November 2011, Johnson joined the Bakersfield Jam of the NBA Development League. On December 28, 2011, he was waived by the Jam. Two days later, he was acquired by the Springfield Armor.

In January 2014, Johnson signed with the Mount Gambier Pioneers for the 2014 SEABL season. In December 2014, he re-signed with the Pioneers for the 2015 season. He helped the team win back-to-back championships in 2015 and earned Defensive Player of the Year honors. In 55 games for the Pioneers over two seasons, he averaged 15.1 points, 9.2 rebounds and 1.9 assists per game.

On November 12, 2015, Johnson signed with the Bendigo Braves for the 2016 SEABL season. He helped Bendigo win the 2016 SEABL championship while earning his third straight title. He also earned back-to-back Defensive Player of the Year honors. In 24 games for the Braves in 2016, he averaged 15.9 points, 8.8 rebounds, 3.6 assists, 1.4 steals and 2.8 blocks per game.

In the wake of winning his third straight SEBAL title, Johnson retired from playing basketball.
