= Lawrence Westbrook =

American basketball player

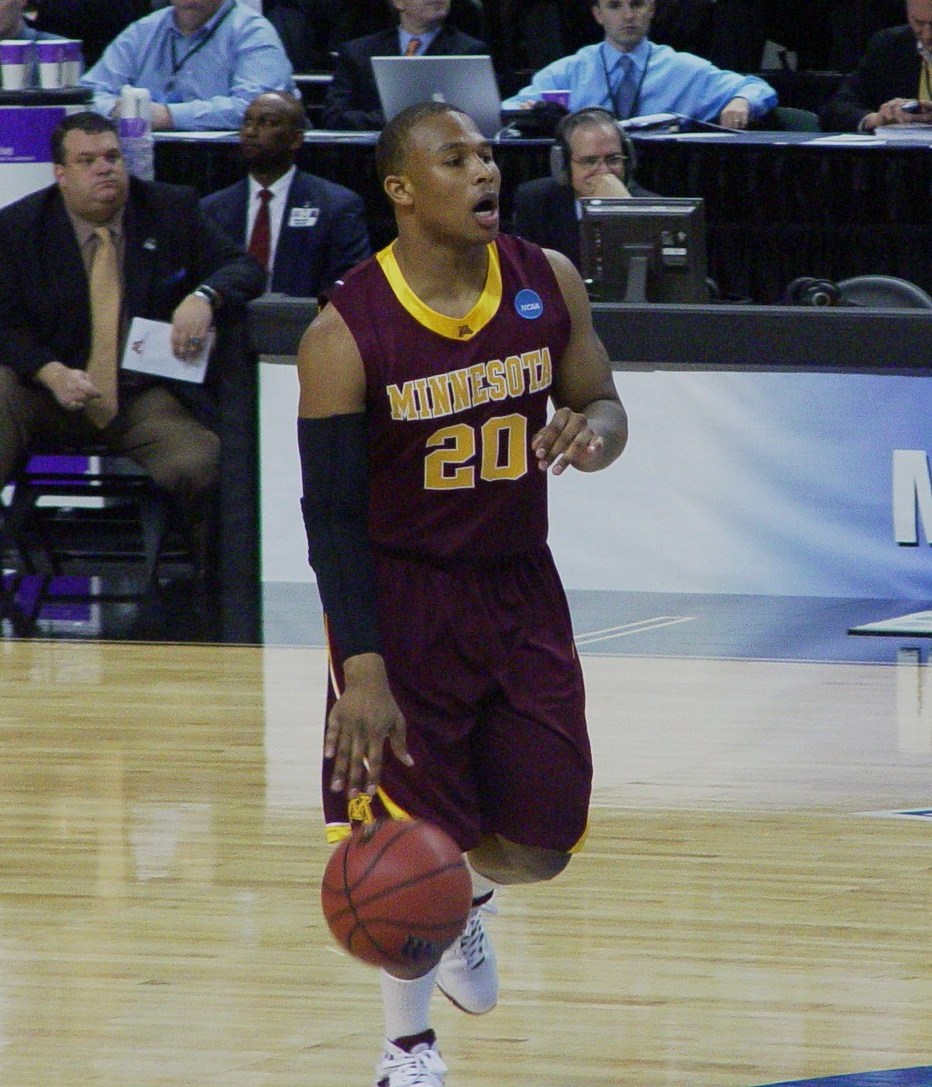

Personal information
- Born: January 17, 1988 (age 38) Chandler, Arizona, U.S.
- Listed height: 6 ft 0 in (1.83 m)
- Listed weight: 185 lb (84 kg)

Career information
- High school: Chandler (Chandler, Arizona); Winchendon Prep (Winchendon, Massachusetts)
- College: Minnesota (2006–2010)
- NBA draft: 2010: undrafted
- Playing career: 2010–2014
- Position: Point guard

Career history
- 2010–2011: Maine Red Claws
- 2011: Dakota Wizards
- 2011: Texas Legends
- 2012–2013: Kazrin/Galil
- 2013: Neckar Riesen Ludwigsburg
- 2014: U-Mobitelco Cluj-Napoca

Lawrence Westbrook (born January 17, 1988) is an American professional basketball point guard. As a senior with the University of Minnesota Golden Gophers basketball team, he averaged 12.2 points per game in the 2008–09 season, and was the Golden Gophers' leading scorer.

He is also the cousin of former NFL player Brian Westbrook.

== High school career ==
As a junior at Chandler High School in Chandler, Arizona, he led the nation in scoring with 41.0 points per contest. He had 883 points in just 22 games that season. He then transferred to Winchendon Prep High in Winchendon, Massachusetts as a senior, where he averaged 19.0 points per game as a senior. Rivals.com named him the 75th best high school basketball player of the decade. He signed with the Minnesota Golden Gophers in the fall of 2005.

== College career ==
Westbrook was leading scorer for the Gophers in the 2008–09 season. He has started almost every game in both his sophomore and junior seasons. In a January 15, 2009 overtime win against the Wisconsin Badgers at the Kohl Center, he had a season-high 29 points, including nine in the extra session, while going 10-for-16 from the field (including 7-of-7 from the free-throw line and 2-for-2 from beyond the arc). He also hit the game-tying 3-pointer with 2 seconds remaining in regulation.

== College statistics ==
College statistics

Legend
GP	Games played	GS	Games started	MPG	Minutes per game
FG%	Field goal percentage	3P%	3-point field goal percentage	FT%	Free throw percentage
RPG	Rebounds per game	APG	Assists per game	SPG	Steals per game
BPG	Blocks per game	PPG	Points per game	**Bold**	Career high

Year	Team	GP	GS	MPG	FG%	3P%	FT%	RPG	APG	SPG	BPG	PPG
2006–07	Minnesota	21	2	10.8	.370	.303	.529	0.6	0.6	0.2	0.0	3.5
2007–08	Minnesota	**34**	**34**	23.5	.420	**.393**	.798	**3.3**	**2.4**	**0.9**	**0.1**	8.5
2008–09	Minnesota	29	23	**24.1**	**.421**	.361	**.857**	**2.6**	1.6	0.7	**0.1**	**12.2**
