= Longwood Lancers men's basketball statistical leaders =

The Longwood Lancers men's basketball statistical leaders are individual statistical leaders of the Longwood Lancers men's basketball program in various categories, including points, rebounds, assists, steals, and blocks. Within those areas, the lists identify single-game, single-season, and career leaders. The Lancers represent Longwood University in the NCAA's Big South Conference.

Longwood began competing in intercollegiate basketball in 1976. The NCAA did not officially record assists as a stat until the 1983–84 season, and blocks and steals until the 1985–86 season, but Longwood's record books includes players in these stats before these seasons. These lists are updated through the end of the 2020–21 season.

== Scoring ==
Career
Rank	Player	Points	Seasons
1	Antwan Carter	1,886	2008–09 2009–10 2010–11 2011–12
2	Kevin Jefferson	1,806	1986–87 1987–88 1988–89 1989–90
3	Jerome Kersey	1,756	1980–81 1981–82 1982–83 1983–84
4	Maurice Sumter	1,604	2003–04 2004–05 2005–06 2006–07
5	Dana Smith	1,540	2004–05 2005–06 2006–07 2007–08 2008–09 2009–10
6	Tristan Carey	1,504	2011–12 2012–13 2013–14
7	Joe Remar	1,479	1979–80 1980–81 1981–82 1982–83
8	Lonnie Lewis	1,452	1982–83 1983–84 1984–85 1985–86
9	Ron Orr	1,335	1979–80 1980–81 1981–82 1982–83
10	Lee Farrior	1,300	1996–97 1997–98 1998–99 1999–00

Season
Rank	Player	Points	Season
1	Jason Pryor	745	2000–01
2	Kevin Jefferson	665	1989–90
3	Charles Stephens	657	2002–03
4	Colin Ducharme	608	2000–01
5	Antwan Carter	601	2011–12
6	Tristan Carey	572	2013–14
7	Lee Farrior	566	1997–98
8	Dana Smith	565	2009–10
	Antwan Carter	565	2010–11
10	Joe Jones	552	1995–96

Single game
Rank	Player	Points	Season	Opponent
1	Jimmy Yarbrough	46	1976–77	Bluefield
2	Jason Pryor	44	2001–02	Charleston (WV)
3	Jason Pryor	41	2000–01	Barton
	Jason Pryor	41	2000–01	West Chester
5	Tristan Carey	40	2012–13	Liberty
6	Kevin Jefferson	38	1987–88	Dowling
7	Jason Pryor	38	2000–01	Mount Olive
8	Darryl Rutley	37	1987–88	Mount St. Mary's
	Lee Farrior	37	1997–98	Queens (NC)
	Jason Pryor	37	2001–02	Coker
	Tristan Carey	37	2013–14	Liberty

== Rebounds ==
Career
Rank	Player	Rebounds	Seasons
1	Jerome Kersey	1,162	1980–81 1981–82 1982–83 1983–84
2	Antwan Carter	1,008	2008–09 2009–10 2010–11 2011–12
3	Dana Smith	708	2004–05 2005–06 2006–07 2007–08 2008–09 2009–10
4	Maurice Sumter	667	2003–04 2004–05 2005–06 2006–07
5	Doug Poppe	653	1986–87 1987–88 1988–89 1989–90
6	Ron Orr	648	1979–80 1980–81 1981–82 1982–83
7	Damarion Geter	627	2013–14 2014–15 2016–17 2017–18 2018–19
8	Bryan Weaver	595	1989–90 1990–91 1991–92 1992–93
9	Greg Holloway	591	1987–88 1988–89 1989–90 1990–91
10	Lamar Barrett	581	2004–05 2005–06 2006–07 2007–08

Season
Rank	Player	Rebounds	Season
1	Colin Ducharme	490	2000–01
2	Jerome Kersey	383	1983–84
3	Antwan Carter	293	2010–11
4	Michael Kessens	290	2012–13
5	Antwan Carter	285	2011–12
	Lotanna Nwogbo	271	2015–16
7	Jerome Kersey	270	1982–83
8	Jerome Kersey	269	1981–82
9	Antwan Carter	265	2009–10
10	Charles Stephens	257	2002–03
	Clayton Morgan	257	2005–06

Single game
Rank	Player	Rebounds	Season	Opponent
1	Jerome Kersey	26	1983–84	UMBC
	Jerome Kersey	26	1983–84	MSM
3	Jerome Kersey	23	1983–84	Virginia St.
4	Colin Ducharme	22	2000–01	Davis
	Colin Ducharme	22	2000–01	Coker
	Colin Ducharme	22	2000–01	Queens (NC)
7	Colin Ducharme	21	2000–01	Belmont Abbey
8	Jerome Kersey	20	1981–82	Armstrong State
	Quinton Kearney	20	1985–86	Barton
	Colin Ducharme	20	2000–01	Mount Olive
	Colin Ducharme	20	2000–01	Pfeiffer
	Antwan Carter	20	2010–11	Wash. Adventist
	Khris Lane	20	2015–16	Randolph

== Assists ==
Career
Rank	Player	Assists	Seasons
1	Joe Remar	531	1979–80 1980–81 1981–82 1982–83
2	Michael Druitt	400	1990–91 1991–92 1992–93 1993–94
3	Lucas Woodhouse	393	2012–13 2013–14
4	Brandon Giles	380	2004–05 2005–06 2006–07 2007–08
5	Kevin Ricks	363	1983–84 1984–85 1985–86 1986–87
6	Dale Shavers	288	1986–87 1987–88 1988–89 1989–90
7	Joe Lowe	275	1987–88 1988–89 1989–90 1990–91 1991–92
8	Maurice Sumter	274	2003–04 2004–05 2005–06 2006–07
9	Charles Brown	271	1991–92 1992–93 1993–94
10	Walyn Napper	269	2022–23 2023–24

Season
Rank	Player	Assists	Season
1	Lucas Woodhouse	213	2013–14
2	Lucas Woodhouse	180	2012–13
3	Walyn Napper	157	2023–24
4	Ryan Earl	147	2002–03
5	Joe Remar	145	1980–81
6	Joe Lowe	141	1990–91
7	Colby Garland	140	2024–25
8	Joe Remar	138	1979–80
9	Joe Remar	137	1982–83
10	Bobby Dobson	136	1988–89

Single game
Rank	Player	Assists	Season	Opponent
1	Joe Remar	15	1980–81	Liberty

== Steals ==
Career
Rank	Player	Steals	Seasons
1	Jerome Kersey	255	1980–81 1981–82 1982–83 1983–84
2	Kevin Ricks	245	1983–84 1984–85 1985–86 1986–87
3	Maurice Sumter	209	2003–04 2004–05 2005–06 2006–07
4	Leron Fisher	202	2013–14 2014–15 2015–16
5	Joe Remar	201	1979–80 1980–81 1981–82 1982–83
6	Jason Outlaw	193	1994–95 1995–96 1996–97 1997–98
7	Bobby Dobson	167	1985–86 1986–87 1987–88 1988–89
8	Matt Watkins	154	1991–92 1992–93 1993–94 1994–95
9	Mike Druitt	153	1990–91 1991–92 1992–93 1993–94
10	Tristan Carey	151	2011–12 2012–13 2013–14

Season
Rank	Player	Steals	Season
1	Bobby Dobson	109	1988–89
2	Mike McCroey	89	1980–81
3	Kevin Ricks	83	1986–87
4	Jerome Kersey	78	1983–84
	Kevin Ricks	78	1984–85
6	Shack Leonard	76	1979–80
7	Jason Outlaw	75	1997–98
8	Tristan Carey	73	2012–13
9	Kevin Swecker	72	2008–09
10	Jerome Kersey	71	1982–83

Single game
Rank	Player	Steals	Season	Opponent
1	Bobby Dobson	9	1988–89	Ferrum

== Blocks ==
Career
Rank	Player	Blocks	Seasons
1	Jerome Kersey	142	1980–81 1981–82 1982–83 1983–84
2	Maurice Sumter	135	2003–04 2004–05 2005–06 2006–07
3	Colin Ducharme	130	2000–01
4	Damarion Geter	105	2013–14 2014–15 2016–17 2017–18 2018–19
5	JaShaun Smith	94	2016–17 2017–18 2018–19 2019–20
6	Doug Poppe	91	1986–87 1987–88 1988–89 1989–90
7	Antwan Carter	88	2008–09 2009–10 2010–11 2011–12
8	Lamar Barrett	81	2004–05 2005–06 2006–07 2007–08
9	Dana Smith	76	2004–05 2005–06 2006–07 2007–08 2008–09 2009–10
10	Quintin Kearney	67	1985–86 1986–87

Season
Rank	Player	Blocks	Season
1	Colin Ducharme	130	2000–01
2	Chad Kosmo	48	2004–05
3	Maurice Sumter	47	2006–07
4	Quinton Kearney	45	1986–87
5	Lotanna Nwogbo	43	2015–16
6	Jerome Kersey	42	1982–83
	Jerome Kersey	42	1983–84
	Michael Kessens	42	2012–13
9	Maurice Sumter	35	2003–04
10	Khris Lane	34	2016–17
	Damarion Geter	34	2017–18

Single game
Rank	Player	Blocks	Season	Opponent
1	Colin Ducharme	11	2000–01	Belmont Abbey
