= 2008–09 Longwood Lancers men's basketball team =

American college basketball season

2008–09 Longwood Lancers men's basketball
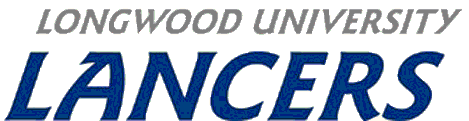
- Conference: Independent
- Record: 17–14
- Head coach: Mike Gillian (6th season)
- Assistant coaches: Bill Reinson (7th season); Doug Thibault (6th season); Tim Fudd (2nd season)
- Home arena: Willett Hall

2008–09 NCAA Division I men's basketball independents standings
	Conf.				Overall
Team	W		L	PCT	W		L	PCT
Seattle		–		–	21	–	8	.724
South Dakota		–		–	20	–	9	.690
Utah Valley		–		–	17	–	11	.607
Chicago State		–		–	19	–	13	.594
North Dakota		–		–	16	–	12	.571
Longwood		–		–	17	–	14	.548
Savannah State		–		–	15	–	14	.517
Texas–Pan American		–		–	10	–	17	.370
SIU Edwardsville		–		–	10	–	20	.333
Cal State Bakersfield		–		–	8	–	21	.276
Bryant		–		–	8	–	21	.276
Houston Baptist		–		–	5	–	25	.167
North Carolina Central		–		–	4	–	27	.129
NJIT		–		–	1	–	30	.032
Rankings from AP Poll

The 2008–09 Longwood Lancers men's basketball team represented Longwood University during the 2008–09 NCAA Division I men's basketball season. The team was led by sixth-year head coach Mike Gillian, and played their home games at Willett Hall as a Division I independent school.

== Last season ==
The Lancers had a record of 9–22 in their first season as a full member of Division I.

== Roster ==
2008–09 Longwood Lancers men's basketball team
Players
Coaches

Pos.	#	Name	Height	Weight	Year	Previous school	Hometown
G	1	E.J. Dawson	6 ft 2 in (1.88 m)	185 lb (84 kg)	Jr	Mount Vernon HS	Alexandria, Virginia
C	4	Antwan Carter	6 ft 6 in (1.98 m)	210 lb (95 kg)	Fr	St. Petersburg HS	St. Petersburg, Florida
G	5	Martiz Washington	6 ft 0 in (1.83 m)	165 lb (75 kg)	Fr	Christchurch	Hopewell, Virginia
G	11	Earl Gee II	5 ft 10 in (1.78 m)	160 lb (73 kg)	So	Manchester HS	Chesterfield, Virginia
F	12	Billy Robinson, Jr.	6 ft 7 in (2.01 m)	200 lb (91 kg)	Jr	Hammond, HS	Columbia, Maryland
G/F	22	Dana Smith	6 ft 5 in (1.96 m)	225 lb (102 kg)	Jr	C. D. Hylton HS	Woodbridge, Virginia
G	23	Ryan Bogan	6 ft 1 in (1.85 m)	200 lb (91 kg)	Sr	Oxford Area HS/Harcum College	Oxford, Pennsylvania
G	24	Kevin Swecker	6 ft 1 in (1.85 m)	180 lb (82 kg)	Jr	Mount Saint Joseph HS	Manchester, Maryland
G	25	Durann Neil	6 ft 1 in (1.85 m)	185 lb (84 kg)	So	Leap Academy	Pleasantville, New Jersey
F	31	Jeffrey Ryan	6 ft 7 in (2.01 m)	180 lb (82 kg)	So	Newburgh	Beacon, New York
F	33	Jan van der Kooij	6 ft 7 in (2.01 m)	205 lb (93 kg)	Fr	Roelof van Echten	Tiendeveen, Netherlands
C	41	Beno Jaekel	6 ft 9 in (2.06 m)	245 lb (111 kg)	Jr	Universitario/Western Nebraska CC	Jussara, Brazil
F	42	Brandon Evans	6 ft 9 in (2.06 m)	180 lb (82 kg)	So	Roanoke Catholic School	Roanoke, Virginia

Head coach

- Mike Gillian (North Adams State)

Assistant coach(es)

- Bill Reinson (Phoenix)
- Doug Thibault (Boise State)
- Tim Fudd (American)

Legend

- (C) Team captain
- (S) Suspended
- (I) Ineligible
- (W) Walk-on
- Injured
- Current redshirt

Roster
Last update: March 4, 2015

== Schedule ==
Date time, TV	Opponent	Result	Record	Site (attendance) city, state
Regular season
November 14*; 7:00 pm	Virginia–Wise	W 87–44	1–0	Willett Hall (1,314); Farmville, VA
November 16*; 7:00 pm	Norfolk State	L 74–81	1–1	Willett Hall (1,116); Farmville, VA
November 18*; 7:00 pm	Gardner–Webb	W 85–84	2–1	Willett Hall (1,218); Farmville, VA
November 20*; 7:00 pm	at West Virginia	L 54–86	2–2	WVU Coliseum (6,917); Morgantown, WV
November 22*; 7:00 pm	at Maryland–Eastern Shore; Las Vegas Invitational	W 61–49	3–2	Hytche Athletic Center (1,247); Princess Anne, MD
November 24*; 7:00 pm	at Kentucky; Las Vegas Invitational	L 57–91	3–3	Rupp Arena (20,105); Lexington, KY
November 28*; 4:00 pm	vs. Southeast Missouri State; Las Vegas Invitational	L 77–81	3–4	Orleans Arena; Las Vegas, NV
November 29*; 2:30 pm	vs. Delaware State; Las Vegas Invitational	W 69–65	4–4	Orleans Arena (300); Las Vegas, NV
December 3*; 7:00 pm	James Madison	W 79–76	5–4	Willett Hall (1,603); Farmville, VA
December 14*; 2:00 pm	at Virginia Tech	L 57–79	5–5	Cassell Coliseum (9,847); Blacksburg, VA
December 17*; 7:00 pm	at Virginia	L 61–90	5–6	John Paul Jones Arena (8,543); Charlottesville, VA
December 20*; 2:00 pm	Virginia Intermont	W 113–60	6–6	Willett Hall (520); Farmville, VA
December 28*; 1:00 pm	at Lehigh	L 57–72	6–7	Stabler Arena (695); Bethlehem, PA
December 30*; 7:00 pm	at Navy	L 80–81	6–8	Alumni Hall (1,625); Annapolis, MD
January 3*; 7:00 pm	George Washington	W 80–78	7–8	Willett Hall (703); Farmville, VA
January 6*; 7:00 pm, SUN	at Florida	L 69–95	7–9	O'Connell Center (10,002); Gainesville, FL
January 12*; 7:00 pm	Chicago State	L 86–94	7–10	Willett Hall (1,312); Farmville, VA
January 17*; 2:00 pm	Savannah State	W 86–76	8–10	Willett Hall (1,327); Farmville, VA
January 21*; 7:00 pm	Southern Virginia	W 91–82	9–10	Willett Hall (931); Farmville, VA
January 24*; 2:00 pm	NJIT	W 63–51	10–10	Willett Hall (1,234); Farmville, VA
January 31*; 7:00 pm	Columbia Union; Coaches vs. Cancer	W 106–46	11–10	Willett Hall (841); Farmville, VA
February 4*; 7:00 pm	Maryland–Eastern Shore	W 98–86	12–10	Willett Hall (1,454); Farmville, VA
February 7*; 1:00 pm	at Savannah State	W 68–64	13–10	Tiger Arena (712); Savannah, GA
February 11*; 7:00 pm	Texas–Pan American	W 77–61	14–10	Willett Hall (1,021); Farmville, VA
February 14*; 8:00 pm	at Texas–Pan American	L 82–86	14–11	UTPA Fieldhouse (361); Edinburg, TX
February 16*; 8:00 pm	at Chicago State	L 84–94	14–12	Jones Convocation Center (964); Chicago, IL
February 21*; 2:00 pm	Colgate	W 80–75	15–12	Willett Hall (947); Farmville, VA
February 23*; 7:00 pm	at High Point	L 69–81	15–13	Millis Athletic Convocation Center (811); High Point, NC
February 25*; 7:00 pm	North Carolina Central	W 109–89	16–13	Willett Hall (1,244); Farmville, VA
February 28*; 7:30 pm	at North Carolina Central	L 64–82	16–14	McLendon–McDougald Gymnasium (1,205); Durham, NC
March 4*; 7:00 pm	at NJIT	W 77–70	17–14	Fleisher Center (457); Newark, NJ
*Non-conference game. (#) Tournament seedings in parentheses. All times are in Eastern Time.
