= 2008–09 Savannah State Tigers basketball team =

American college basketball season

2008–09 Savannah State Tigers men's basketball
- Conference: Independent
- Record: 15–14
- Head coach: Horace Broadnax
- Assistant coaches: Jay Gibbons; Clyde Wormley
- Home arena: Tiger Arena

2008–09 NCAA Division I men's basketball independents standings
	Conf.				Overall
Team	W		L	PCT	W		L	PCT
Seattle		–		–	21	–	8	.724
South Dakota		–		–	20	–	9	.690
Utah Valley		–		–	17	–	11	.607
Chicago State		–		–	19	–	13	.594
North Dakota		–		–	16	–	12	.571
Longwood		–		–	17	–	14	.548
Savannah State		–		–	15	–	14	.517
Texas–Pan American		–		–	10	–	17	.370
SIU Edwardsville		–		–	10	–	20	.333
Cal State Bakersfield		–		–	8	–	21	.276
Bryant		–		–	8	–	21	.276
Houston Baptist		–		–	5	–	25	.167
North Carolina Central		–		–	4	–	27	.129
NJIT		–		–	1	–	30	.032
Rankings from AP Poll

The 2008–09 Savannah State Tigers basketball team competed in American basketball on behalf of Savannah State University. The Tigers competed in the NCAA Division I as an independent. The head coach is Horace Broadnax who is in his fourth year. The team played its home games at Tiger Arena in Savannah, Georgia. The Tigers entered the season seeking to improve on the 13–18 record posted in the 2007–08 season.

== Season notes ==
=== Pre-season notes ===
- July 3, 2008 - Mark St. Fort, Arnold Louis, Rashad Hassan, Josh Smith and Glen Izevbigie sign letters-of-intent with Savannah State University.

=== Regular season notes ===
- December 19, 2008 - The game against South Carolina State University was moved from Saturday, December 20, 2008, to Wednesday, January 14, 2009. The schedule change was made because inclement weather delayed the return of the South Carolina State men's basketball team from another competition.

== Roster ==
SSU Men's Basketball; Roster
Head coach: Horace Broadnax
G	1	Patrick Hardy	Junior	5-10, 180	Atlanta, GA (Westlake)
G	2	Tracy Rankins	Junior	5-10, 180	Queens, NY (Douglas County)
F	3	Mark St. Fort	Freshman	6-6, 210	Wauchula, FL (Hardee Senior)
F	4	Rod Mitchell	Sophomore	6-7, 205	Columbus, GA (G.W. Carver)
G	5	Raye Bailey	Senior	5-11, 180	Port St. Joe, FL (Port St. Joe/Gulf Coast CC)
F	10	Josh Smith	Freshman	6-5, 195	Savannah, GA (Johnson)
G	13	Anthony Jones	Sophomore	6-3, 190	Stone Mountain, GA (Miller Groves)
C	14	Glen Izevbigie	Junior	6-10, 230	London, England (Richmond Academy/Garett)
G/F	20	Jovonni Shuler	Junior	6-4, 180	Lake Placid, FL (Lake Placid)
F	22	Rashad Hassan	Freshman	6-7, 215	Riverdale, GA (Riverdale)
G/F	23	Curtis Brown	Sophomore	6-5, 185	Hephzibah, GA (Hephzibah)
F	24	Chris Linton	Senior	6-6, 195	Jacksonville, FL (Ribault)
F	34	Devin Stowers	Senior	6-4, 205	Hephzibah, GA (Hephzibah)
F	42	Arnold, Louis	Freshman	6-7, 205	Wauchula, FL (Hardee Senior)
G	55	LaQuinton Fort	Freshman	6-2, 172	Thomson, GA (Thomson)

=== Coaching staff ===
Name	Type	College	Graduating year
Horace Broadnax	Head coach	Georgetown University	1986
Jay Gibbons	Assistant coach	Clayton State University	2003
Clyde Wormley	Assistant coach	The Citadel	2003

== Schedule ==
Date time, TV	Rank^{#}	Opponent^{#}	Result	Record	Site city, state
November 14*; 7:00 p.m.		Brewton-Parker College	W 83-45; Recap	1-0	Tiger Arena; Savannah, GA
November 16*; 3:00 p.m.		University of North Florida	W 75-60; Recap	2-0	Tiger Arena; Savannah, GA
November 18*; 7:00 p.m.		Coastal Carolina University	W 66-65; Recap	3-0	Tiger Arena; Savannah, GA
November 22*; 11:30 a.m.		University of New Orleans	W 54-44; Recap	4-0	Tiger Arena; Savannah, GA
November 25*; 8:00 p.m.		at Clemson University	W 81-49; Recap	4-1	Littlejohn Coliseum; Clemson, SC
November 29*; 2:00 p.m.		at University of Michigan	W 66-64; Recap ^{OT}	4-2	Crisler Arena; Ann Arbor, MI
December 1*; 7:30 p.m.		Bowling Green State University	W 57-54; Recap	5-2	Tiger Arena; Savannah, GA
December 6*; 8:00 p.m.		at Saint Louis University	W 55-37; Recap	5-3	Chaifetz Arena; St. Louis, MO
December 8*; 7:30 p.m.		at No. 19 Georgetown University	W 100-38; Recap	5-4	Verizon Center; Washington, D.C.
December 16*; 7:00 p.m.		Kennesaw State University	W 53-49; Recap	6-4	Tiger Arena; Savannah, GA
December 18*; 7:00 p.m.		Texas A&M University–Corpus Christi	W 47-42; Recap	7-4	Tiger Arena; Savannah, GA
December 22*; 7:00 p.m.		at University of Notre Dame	W 81-49; Recap	7-5	Edmund P. Joyce Center; South Bend, IN
December 30*; 6:00 p.m.		Bethune-Cookman University	W 55-29; Recap	7-6	Tiger Arena; Savannah, GA
January 3*; 3:00 p.m.		at University of Alabama-Birmingham	W 63-37; Recap	7-7	Bartow Arena; Birmingham, AL
January 6*; 9:00 p.m.		at Oklahoma State University–Stillwater	W 83-56; Recap	7-8	Gallagher-Iba Arena; Stillwater, OK
January 12*; 7:00 p.m.		Talladega College	W 78-70 ^{OT; Recap}	8-8	Tiger Arena; Savannah, GA
January 14*; 7:00 p.m.		South Carolina State University	W 57-53; Recap	9-8	Tiger Arena; Savannah, GA
January 17*; 2:00 p.m.		at Longwood	W 86-76; Recap	9-9	Willett Hall; Farmville, VA
January 20*; 7:00 p.m.		at Jacksonville University	L 56-69; Recap	9-10	Jacksonville Veterans Memorial Arena; Jacksonville, FL
January 24*; 4:00 p.m.		at Utah Valley University	W 55-39; Recap	9-11	McKay Events Center; Orem, UT
January 28*; 7:00 p.m.		Allen University	W 77-43; Recap	10-11	Tiger Arena; Savannah, GA
January 31*; 7:30 p.m.		at North Carolina Central University	W 67-51; Recap	11-11	McClendon-McDougald Gymnasium; Durham, NC
February 2*; 8:00 p.m.		at University of Texas–Pan American	W 64-58; Recap	12-11	UTPA Fieldhouse; Edinburg, TX
February 7*; 1:00 p.m.		Longwood University	W 68-64 Recap	12-12	Tiger Arena; Savannah, GA
February 12*; 8:00 p.m.		at Stetson University	W 66-52 Recap	12-13	Edmunds Center; DeLand, FL
February 14*; 3:00 p.m.		Utah Valley University	L 58-69 Recap	12-14	Tiger Arena; Savannah, GA
February 18*; 7:00 p.m.		Florida Atlantic University	W 79-66 Recap	13-14	Tiger Arena; Savannah, GA
February 26*; 7:00 p.m.		Carver Bible College	W 103-44; Recap	14-14	Tiger Arena; Savannah, GA
March 2*; 7:00 p.m.		North Carolina Central University	W 69-64; Recap	15-14	Tiger Arena; Savannah, GA
*Non-conference game. ^{#}Rankings from AP Poll. (#) Tournament seedings in parentheses. All times are in Eastern Time.

== Awards ==
- Junior guard/forward Jovonni Shuler and freshman forward Rashad Hassan received Honorable Mention honors on the 2008-09 Division I All-Independent men's basketball team.
- Chris Linton and Raye Bailey were selected as co-Most Valuable Player for the 2008–09 season.
