= James Carpenter (defensive tackle) =

American football player (born 2001)

Indiana Hoosiers
- Title: Defensive quality control coach

Personal information
- Born: May 31, 2001 (age 25); Roanoke, Virginia, U.S.
- Listed height: 6 ft 1 in (1.85 m)
- Listed weight: 293 lb (133 kg)

Career information
- Position: Defensive tackle
- High school: Roanoke Catholic (VA)
- College: James Madison (2019-23); Indiana (2024)
- NFL draft: 2025: undrafted

Career history

Playing
- Jacksonville Jaguars (2025); Birmingham Stallions (2026)

Coaching
- Indiana (2026-present) Defensive quality control

Awards and highlights
- 2× Second-team All-Sun Belt (2022, 2023)

James Carpenter (born May 31, 2001) is a former American professional football defensive tackle and current quality control coach. He played college football for the James Madison Dukes and Indiana Hoosiers.

== Early life ==
Carpenter attended Roanoke Catholic School in Roanoke, Virginia. He committed to play college football for the James Madison Dukes, joining the team as a walk-on.

== College career ==
=== James Madison ===
During his first three seasons from 2019 through 2021, Carpenter appeared in 16 games with 13 starts, where he totaled 36 tackles with seven and a half being for a loss, two sacks, two pass deflections, and an interception. In 2022, he tallied 51 tackles with 11.5 being for a loss, five and a half sacks, and three pass deflections. In week two of the 2023 season, Carpenter notched four tackles with one and a half being for a loss, and a pass deflection, in a win over Virginia. In week seven, he recorded an interception in a 41–13 win over Georgia Southern. Carpenter finished the 2023 season starting all 13 games for James Madison, where he notched 53 tackles with nine being for a loss, four sacks, four pass deflections, an interception, a forced fumble and two fumble recoveries. Carpenter was named a finalist for the Burlsworth Trophy. After the conclusion of the 2023 season, he entered his name into the NCAA transfer portal.

=== Indiana ===
Carpenter transferred to play for the Indiana Hoosiers. For his performance during the 2024 season, he was once again named a finalist for the Burlsworth Trophy.

== Professional career ==
Pre-draft measurables
Height	Weight	Arm length	Hand span	Wingspan	40-yard dash	10-yard split	20-yard split	20-yard shuttle	Three-cone drill	Vertical jump	Broad jump	Bench press
6 ft 0 7/8 in (1.85 m)	293 lb (133 kg)	31 in (0.79 m)	9 7/8 in (0.25 m)	6 ft 3 1/2 in (1.92 m)	4.99 s	1.70 s	2.88 s	4.56 s	7.84 s	29.0 in (0.74 m)	8 ft 6 in (2.59 m)	22 reps
All values from Pro Day

=== Jacksonville Jaguars ===
On April 27, 2025, Carpenter signed with the Jacksonville Jaguars as an undrafted free agent. He was waived on August 26 as part of final roster cuts.

=== Birmingham Stallions ===
On January 14, 2026, Carpenter was selected by the Birmingham Stallions of the United Football League (UFL).
