= Mike Gillian =

American basketball player and coach

Biographical details
- Born: July 19, 1964 (age 62); Ayer, Massachusetts, U.S.

Playing career
- 1985–1989: North Adams State

Coaching career (HC unless noted)
- 1989–1995: American International (asst.)
- 1996–1997: Bowling Green (asst.)
- 1997–2003: George Mason (asst.)
- 2003–2013: Longwood
- 2013–2018: Florida International (asst.)

Head coaching record
- Overall: 93–214 (.303)

Mike Gillian is an American basketball coach, and formerly served as the head men's basketball coach at Longwood University from 2003 to 2013. Resigning from Longwood on March 14, 2013, he had guided the team in their transition to NCAA Division I play, and into their first season as members of the Big South Conference. Prior to his time at Longwood, he was an assistant coach for seven years under Jim Larrañaga at Bowling Green and George Mason.

On November 7, 2013, Gillian was announced as an assistant coach at Florida International University. Gillian was not retained after FIU hired Jeremy Ballard as head coach in April 2018. As of the 2018–19 season, he is providing color commentary for broadcasts on ESPN platforms.

== Head coaching record ==
Record table
Season	Team	Overall	Conference	Standing	Postseason
Longwood Lancers (Division II independent) (2003–2004)
2003–04	Longwood	5–22			
Longwood:		5–22 (.179)			
Longwood Lancers (Division I independent) (2004–2012)
2004–05	Longwood	1–30			
2005–06	Longwood	10–20			
2006–07	Longwood	9–22			
2007–08	Longwood	9–22			
2008–09	Longwood	17–14			
2009–10	Longwood	12–19			
2010–11	Longwood	12–19			
2011–12	Longwood	10–21			
Longwood:		81–167 (.327)			
Longwood Lancers (Big South Conference) (2012–2013)
2012–13	Longwood	8–25	4–12		
Longwood:		8–25 (.242)	4–12 (.250)		
Total:		93–214 (.303)	4–12 (.250)		
National champion Postseason invitational champion Conference regular season champion Conference regular season and conference tournament champion Division regular season champion Division regular season and conference tournament champion Conference tournament champion
