= 2008–09 Michigan Wolverines men's basketball team =

American college basketball season

2008–09 Michigan Wolverines men's basketball

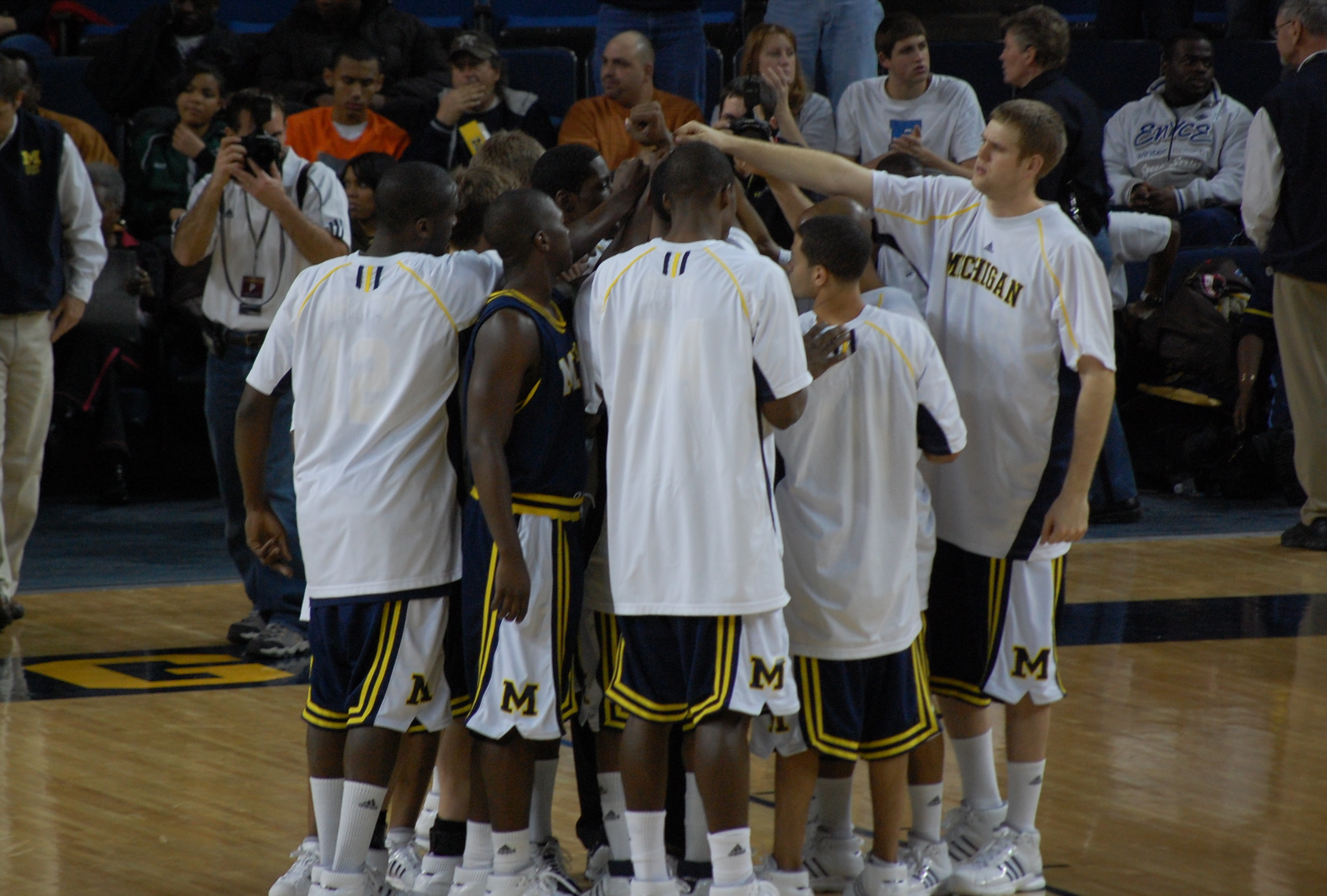

NCAA tournament, Round of 32
- Conference: Big Ten Conference
- Record: 21–14 (9–9 Big Ten)
- Head coach: John Beilein (2nd season)
- Assistant coaches: Jerry Dunn; Mike Jackson; John Mahoney
- MVPs: Manny Harris; DeShawn Sims
- Captains: Jevohn Shepherd; David Merritt
- Home arena: Crisler Arena

2008–09 Big Ten Conference men's basketball standings
	Conf.				Overall
Team	W		L	PCT	W		L	PCT
No. 8 Michigan State	15	–	3	.833	31	–	7	.816
No. 17 Purdue†	11	–	7	.611	27	–	10	.730
Illinois	11	–	7	.611	24	–	10	.706
Penn State	10	–	8	.556	27	–	11	.711
Ohio State	10	–	8	.556	22	–	11	.667
Wisconsin	10	–	8	.556	20	–	13	.606
Minnesota	9	–	9	.500	22	–	11	.667
Michigan	9	–	9	.500	21	–	14	.600
Northwestern	8	–	10	.444	17	–	14	.548
Iowa	5	–	13	.278	15	–	17	.469
Indiana	1	–	17	.056	6	–	25	.194
† 2009 Big Ten tournament winner Rankings from AP poll

The 2008–09 Michigan Wolverines men's basketball team represented the University of Michigan in competitive college basketball during the 2008–09 NCAA Division I season. The 2008–09 season marked the team's ninety-second consecutive season as a member of the National Collegiate Athletic Association's (NCAA) Big Ten Conference. The team finished the season with a 21–14 overall record and a 9–9 conference record. The 9–9 conference record tied for seventh place in the 2008–09 Big Ten conference standings. Michigan was seeded seventh in the single-elimination 2009 Big Ten Conference men's basketball tournament where it advanced one round. They were seeded tenth in the South Regional bracket of the single-elimination 2009 NCAA Division I men's basketball tournament, where it also advanced one round before losing to the Blake Griffin-led Oklahoma Sooners. Jevohn Shepherd and David Merritt served as team co-captains, and Manny Harris and DeShawn Sims shared team MVP honors.

The 2008–09 season marked a turnaround for the team for several reasons. The team rebounded from a 10–22 overall record and a 5–13 conference record during the previous 2007–08 season. The season was highlighted by the team's first two wins in eleven years against teams ranked among the top five in the AP Poll, and by the team's first trip to the NCAA Division I men's basketball tournament since the 1998 tournament. Although the team had appeared in the 1998 NCAA tournament, the last appearance in the NCAA tournament that had been recognized in official NCAA records as not having been tainted by the University of Michigan basketball scandal was their 1995 tournament appearance. The team was in its first year off scholarship probation, which following the scandal had restricted the number of available scholarships. However, the team continued to be prohibited from affiliating with implicated athletes (Chris Webber, Robert Traylor, Maurice Taylor, and Louis Bullock) until 2012, which meant, among other things, that the players could not help the university recruit. The team began the season unranked, but in December 2008 it earned its first place in the top 25 since February 2006. As the season progressed, the team adopted the slogan "Queme los barcos", which is Spanish for "burn the ships", as a reminder that there was no turning back.

For the forty-second consecutive season, the team played its home games in Ann Arbor, Michigan, at the Crisler Arena, which has a capacity of 13,751. John Beilein was in his second season as head coach with the team during the 2008–2009 season. At the conclusion of the season, guard Manny Harris was named to the All-Big Ten first team, and forward DeShawn Sims was selected by the Big Ten media to the second team and chosen by the Big Ten coaches for the third team.

== Preview ==
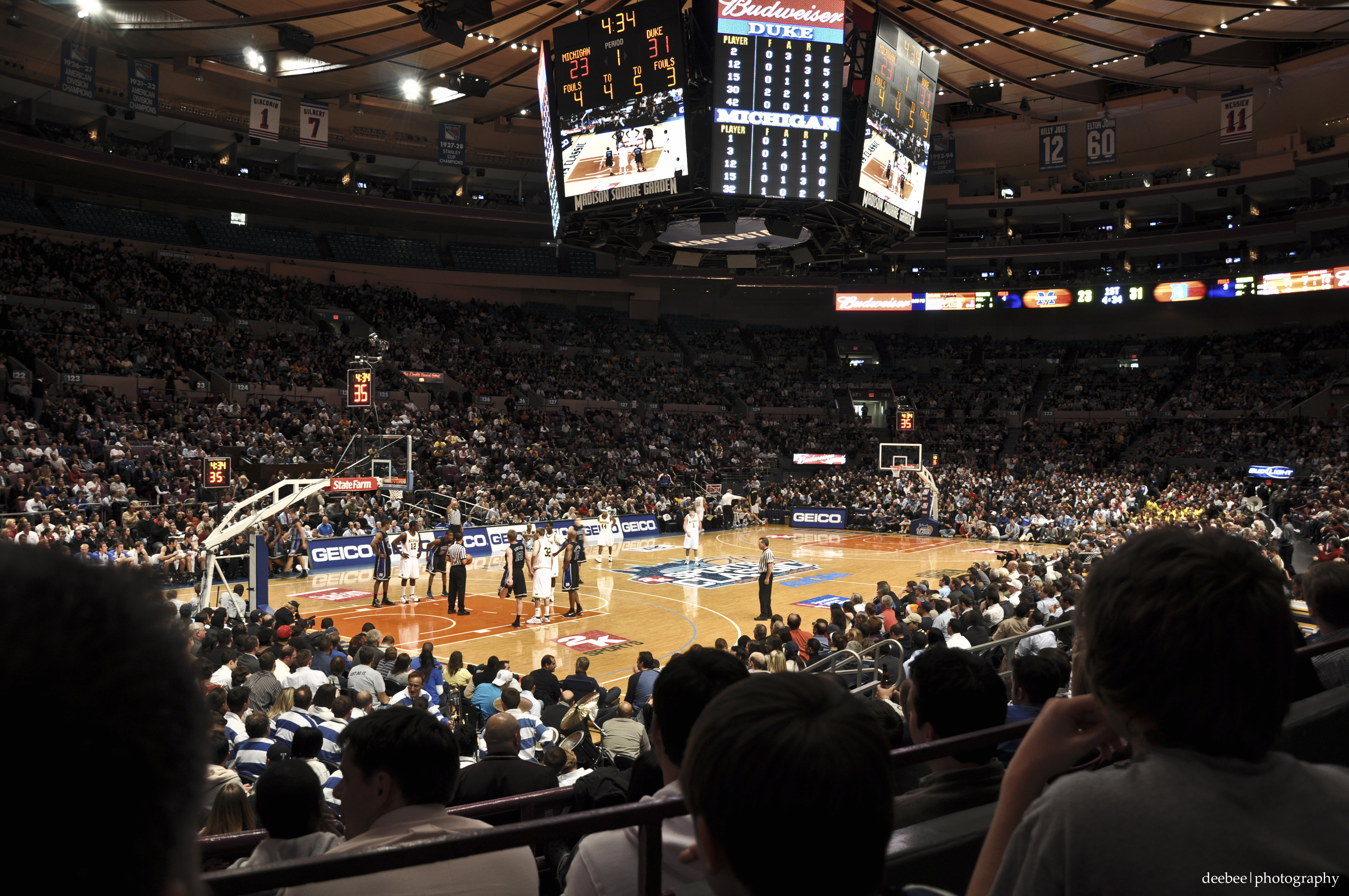
Manny Harris shoots free throws in the first Duke game.

Their 2008–09 pre-conference schedule included Atlantic Coast Conference members Maryland Terrapins and Duke Blue Devils, who went on to win the 2009 ACC men's basketball tournament. The team also played against geographical rival Eastern Michigan and the preseason #2 ranked Connecticut Huskies.

Unlike conference rivals Michigan State, Purdue, and Wisconsin, Michigan was not ranked in the top 25 by either the Associated Press or the ESPN/USA Today preseason polls. In fact, the team did not even receive any votes, like rival Ohio State, in either poll. Pre season reports described the team as a contender for fifth place in the conference. Although the team was building from a 10–22 record, it won five of its last ten games the prior year. A poll of 22 members of the media published in the Detroit Free Press ranked Michigan eighth in the conference. The Sports Illustrated 2008 College Basketball Preview issue did not select the team as one of the five predicted Big Ten teams (the four mentioned above and the Minnesota Golden Gophers) to qualify for the NCAA tournament.

== Roster ==
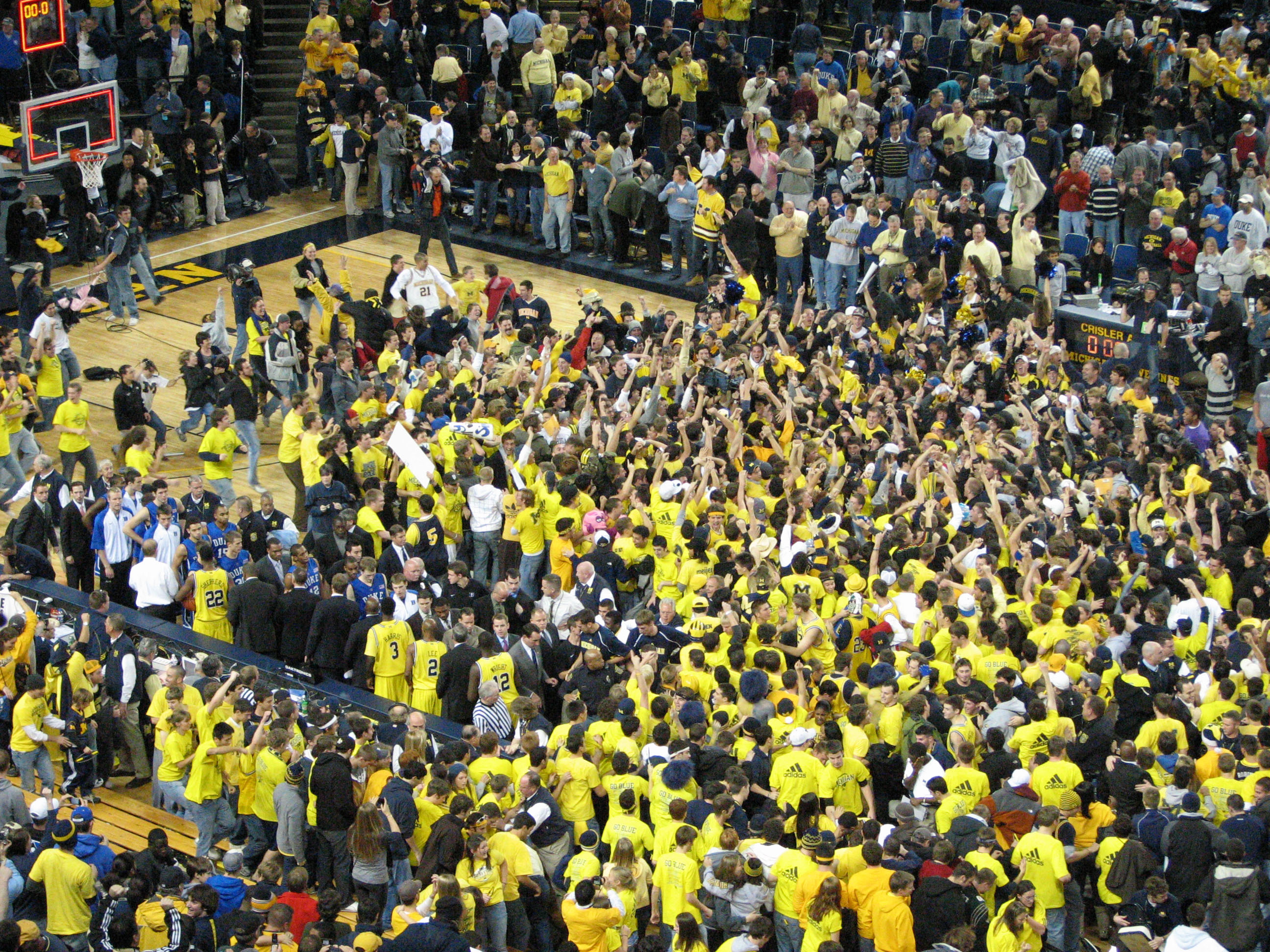
Crisler Arena fans celebrate December 6, 2008 victory over Duke.

The 2008–09 Michigan Wolverine's Top five scorers
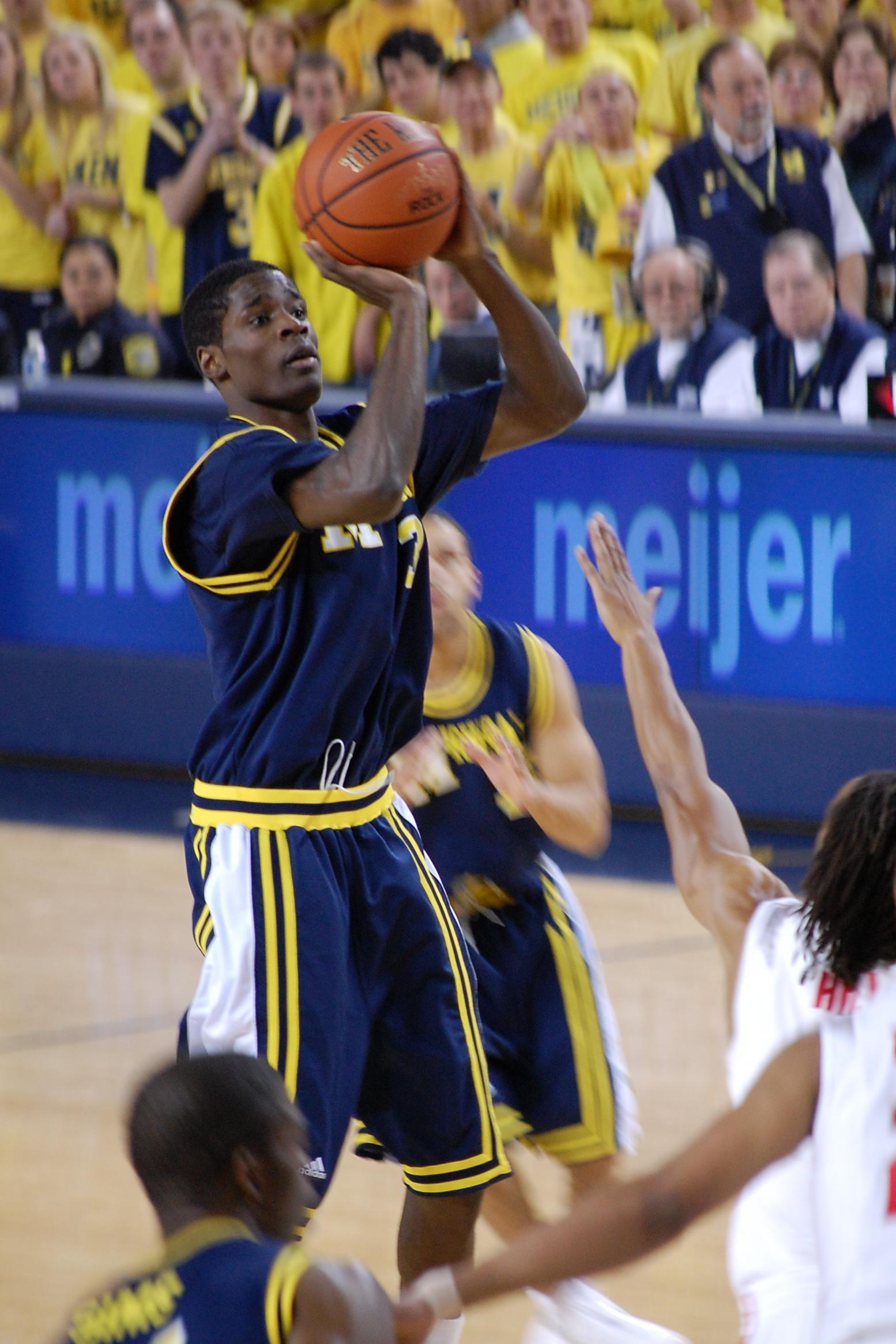
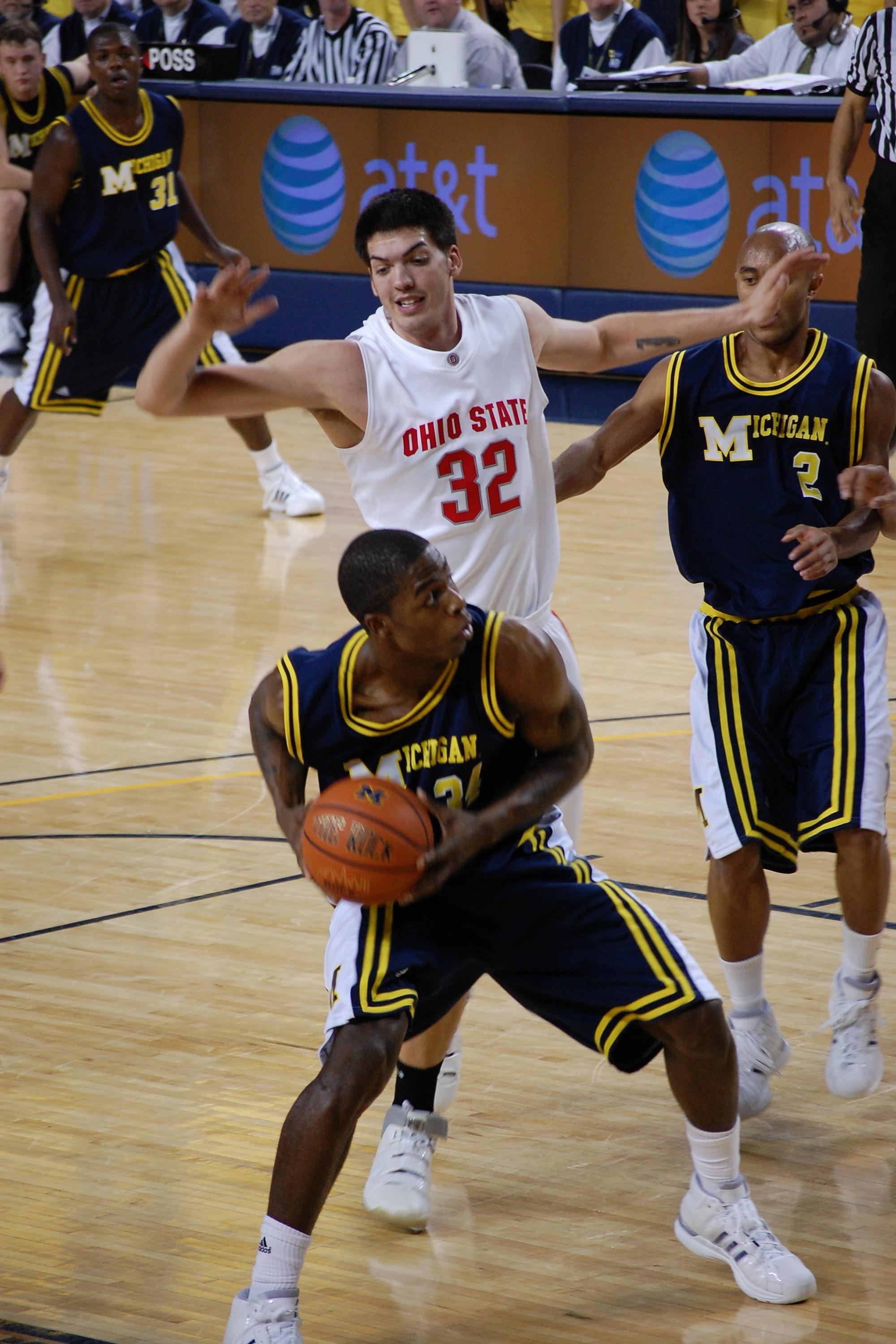
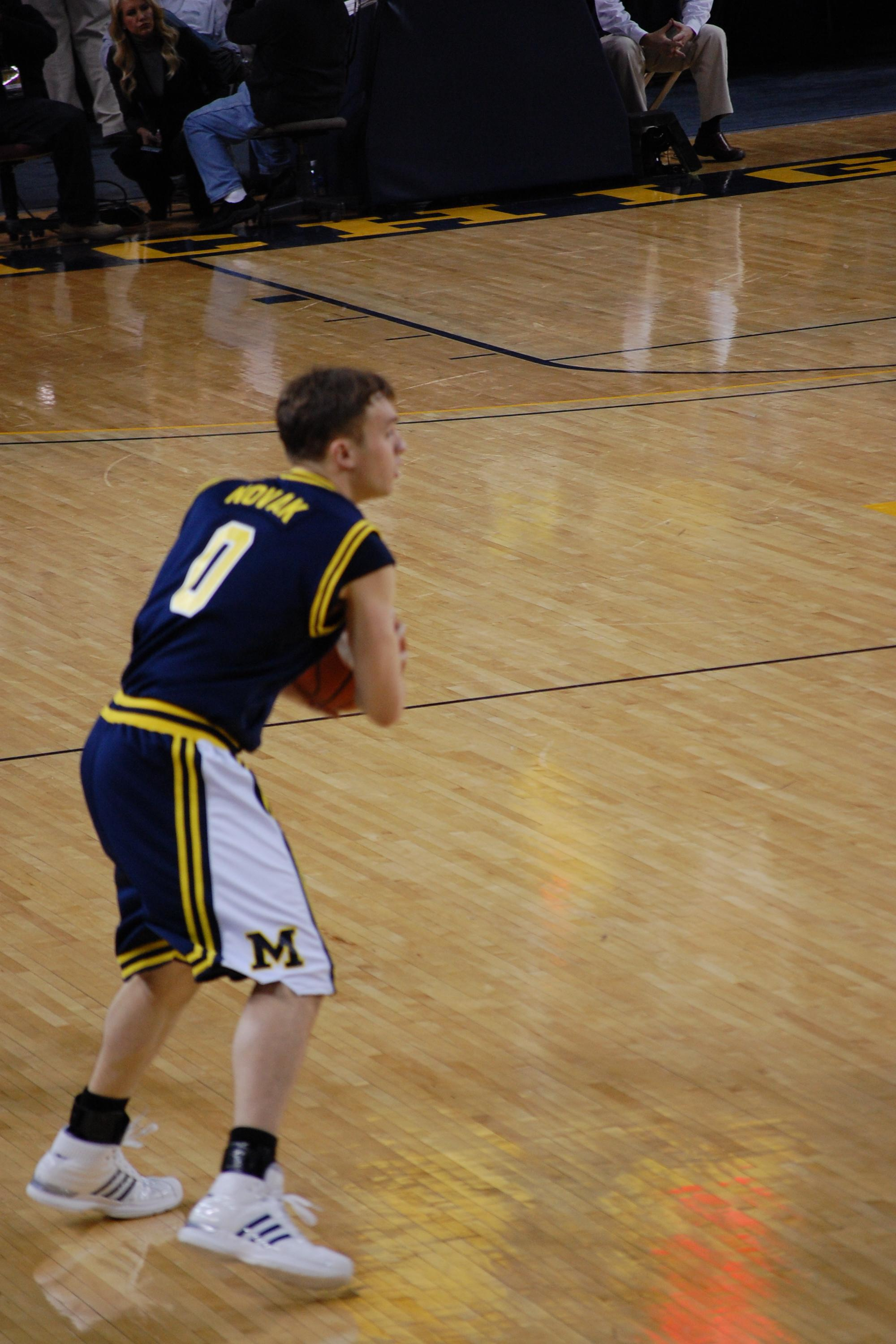
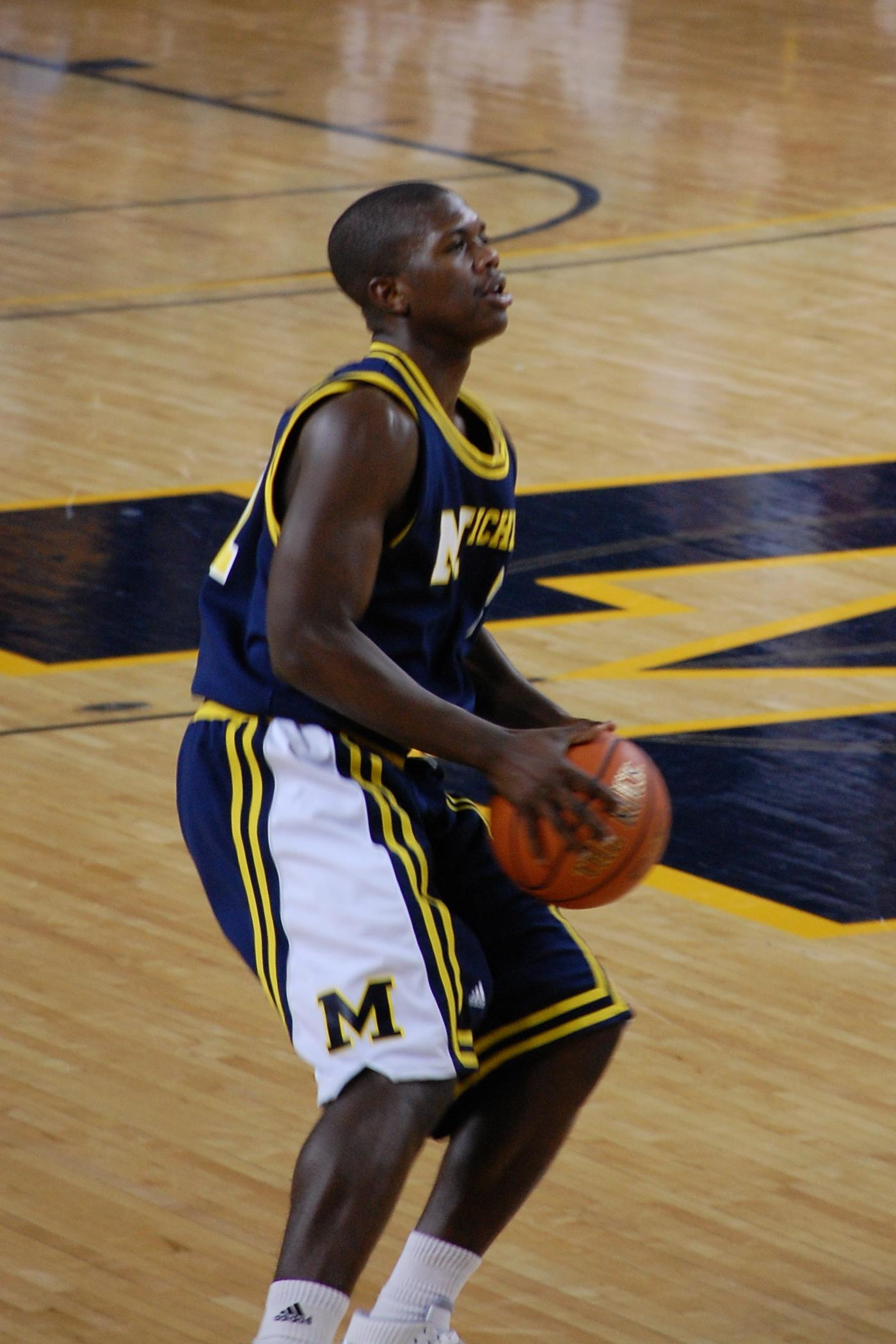
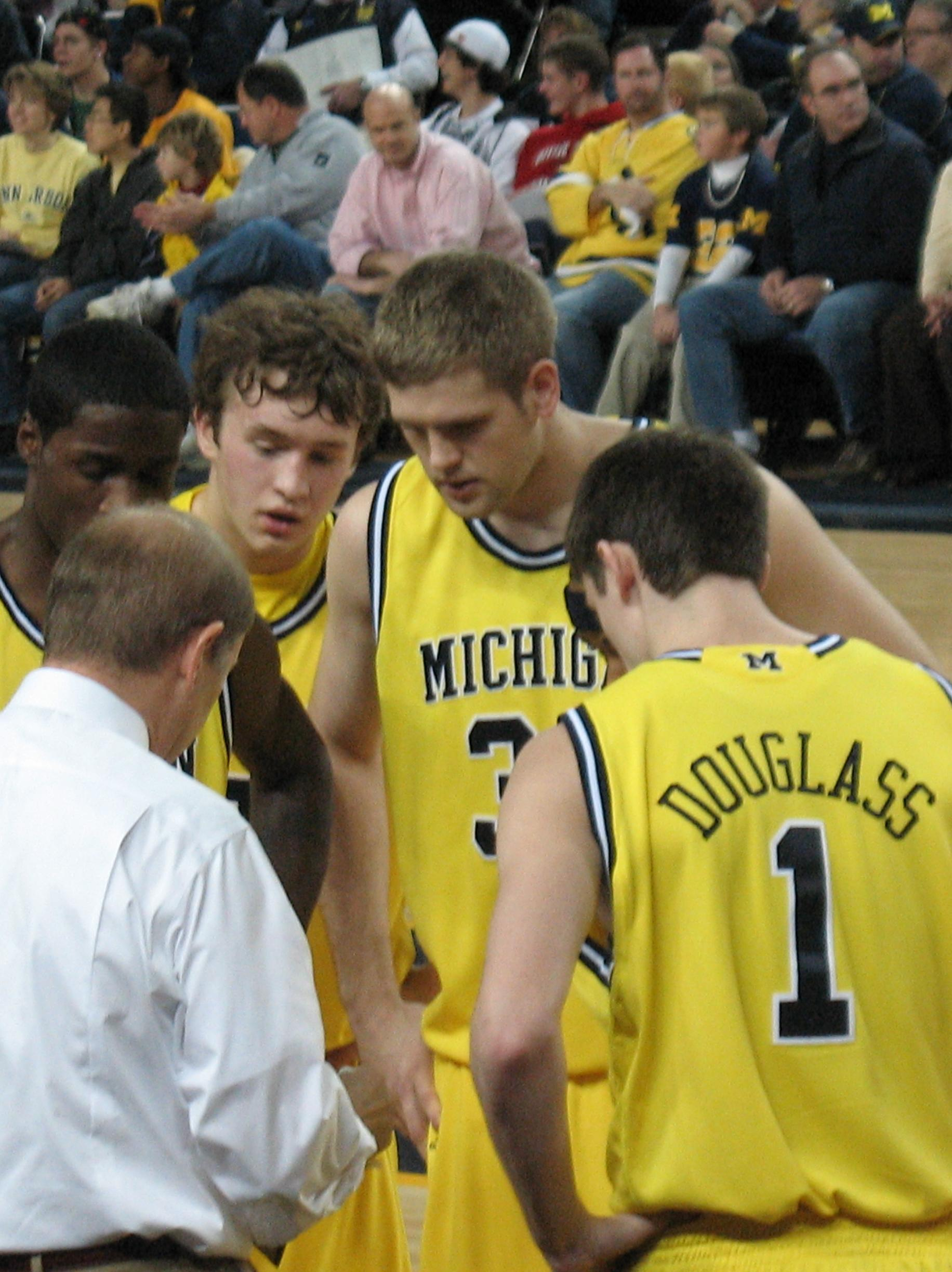
Left to right: Michigan's top 4 scorers: Harris, Sims, Novak, and Lucas-Perry vs. Ohio State in 1989 Michigan Championship throwback uniforms (1-17-2009) and #5: Douglass vs. Illinois (April 1, 2009)

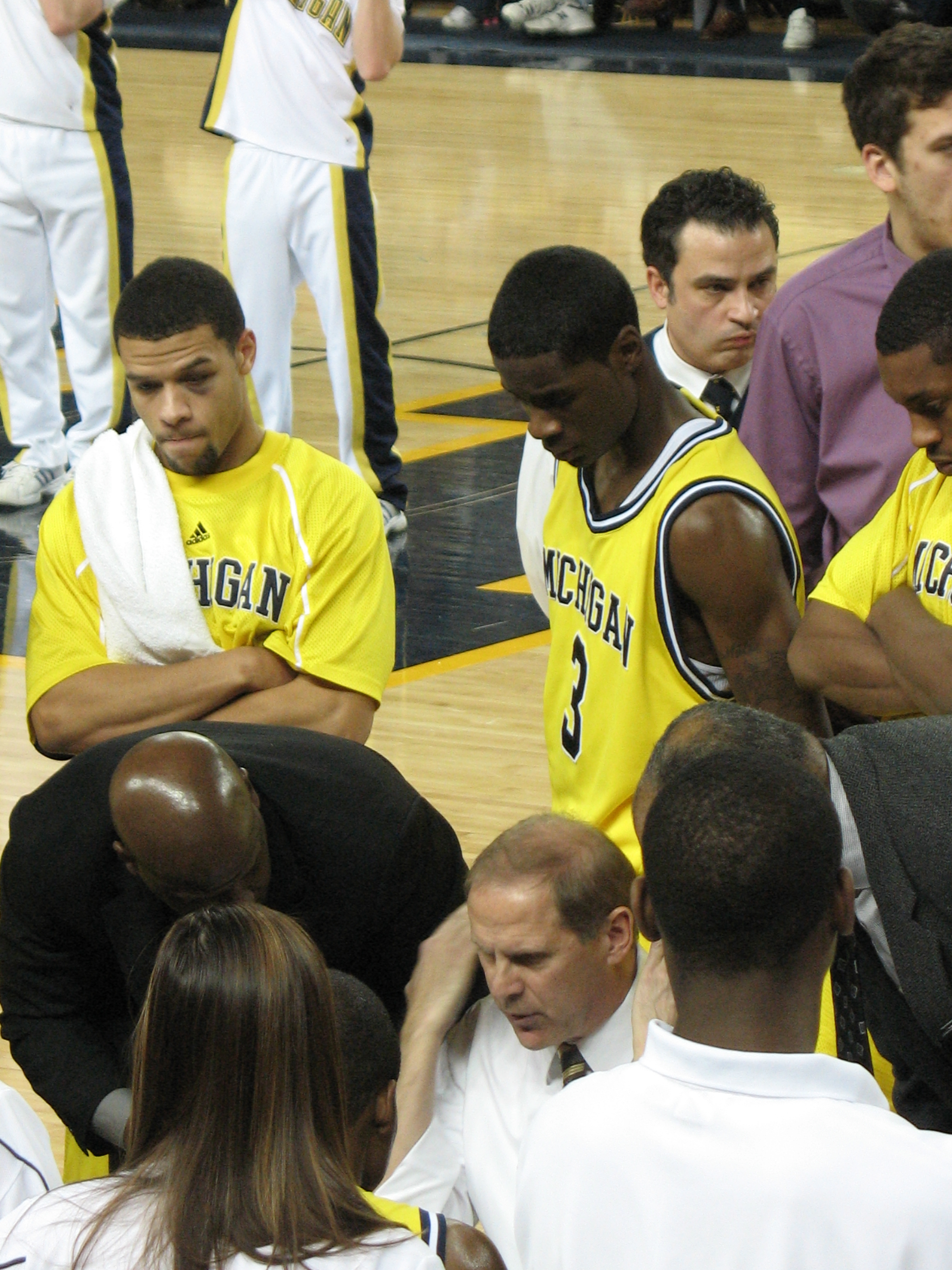
Head coach John Beilein in the huddle as David Merritt and Manny Harris look on.(2009-1-4)

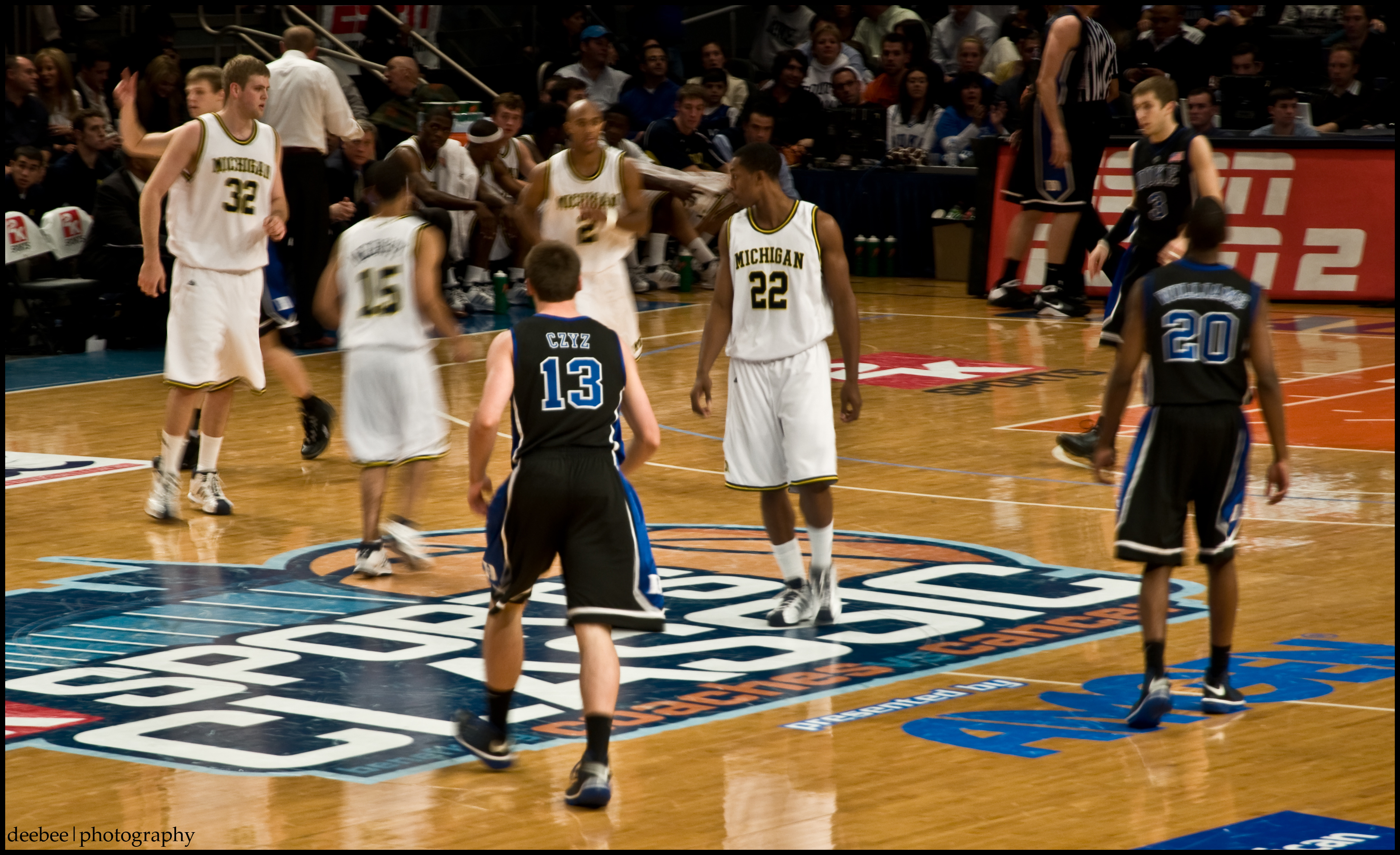
Gibson (32), Merritt (15), Lee (2), and Shepherd (22) against Duke at 2k Sports Classic (2008-11-21)

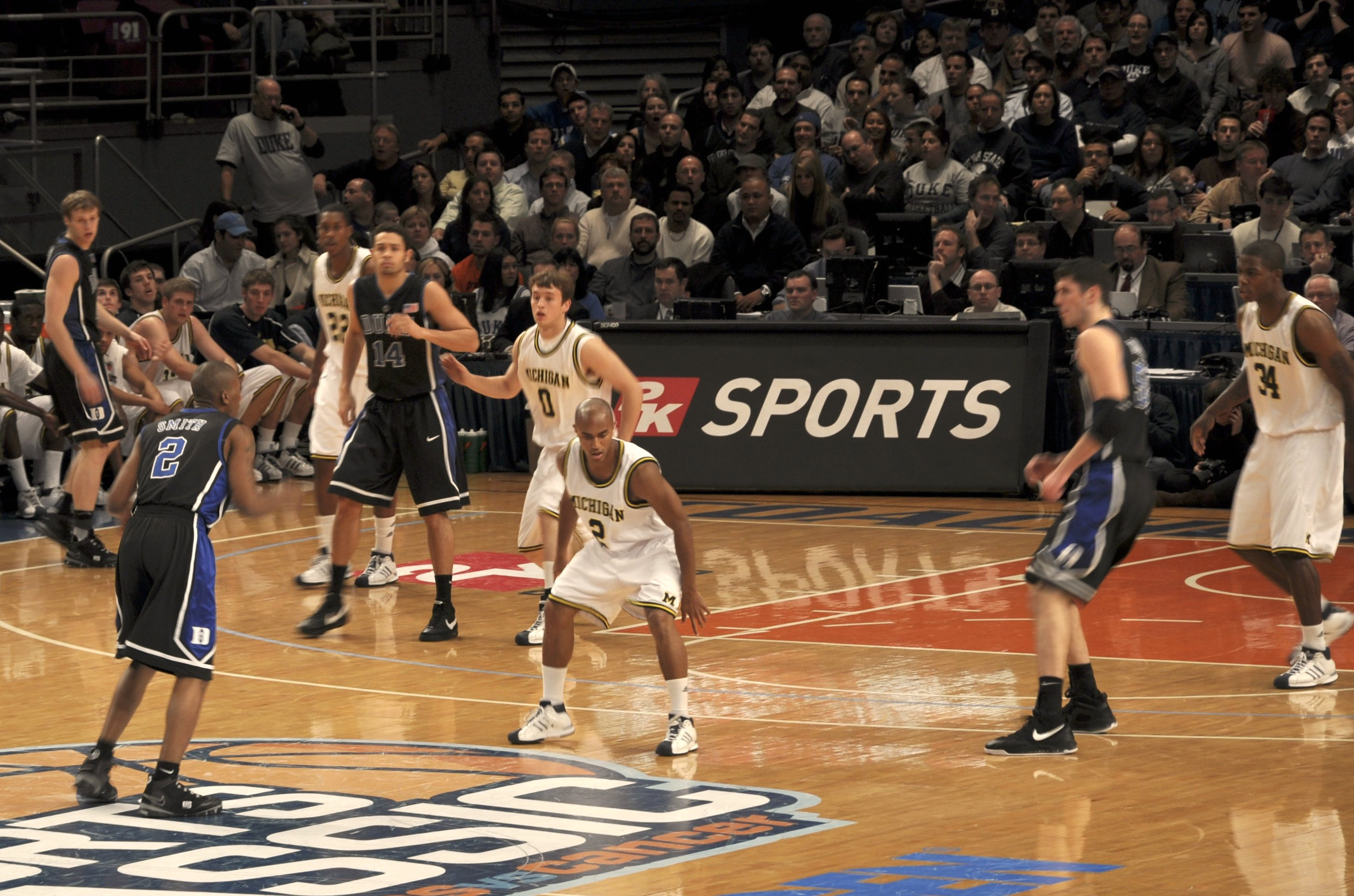
Shepherd (22), Novak (0), Lee (2), and Sims (34) defend against Duke at 2k Sports Classic (2008-11-21)

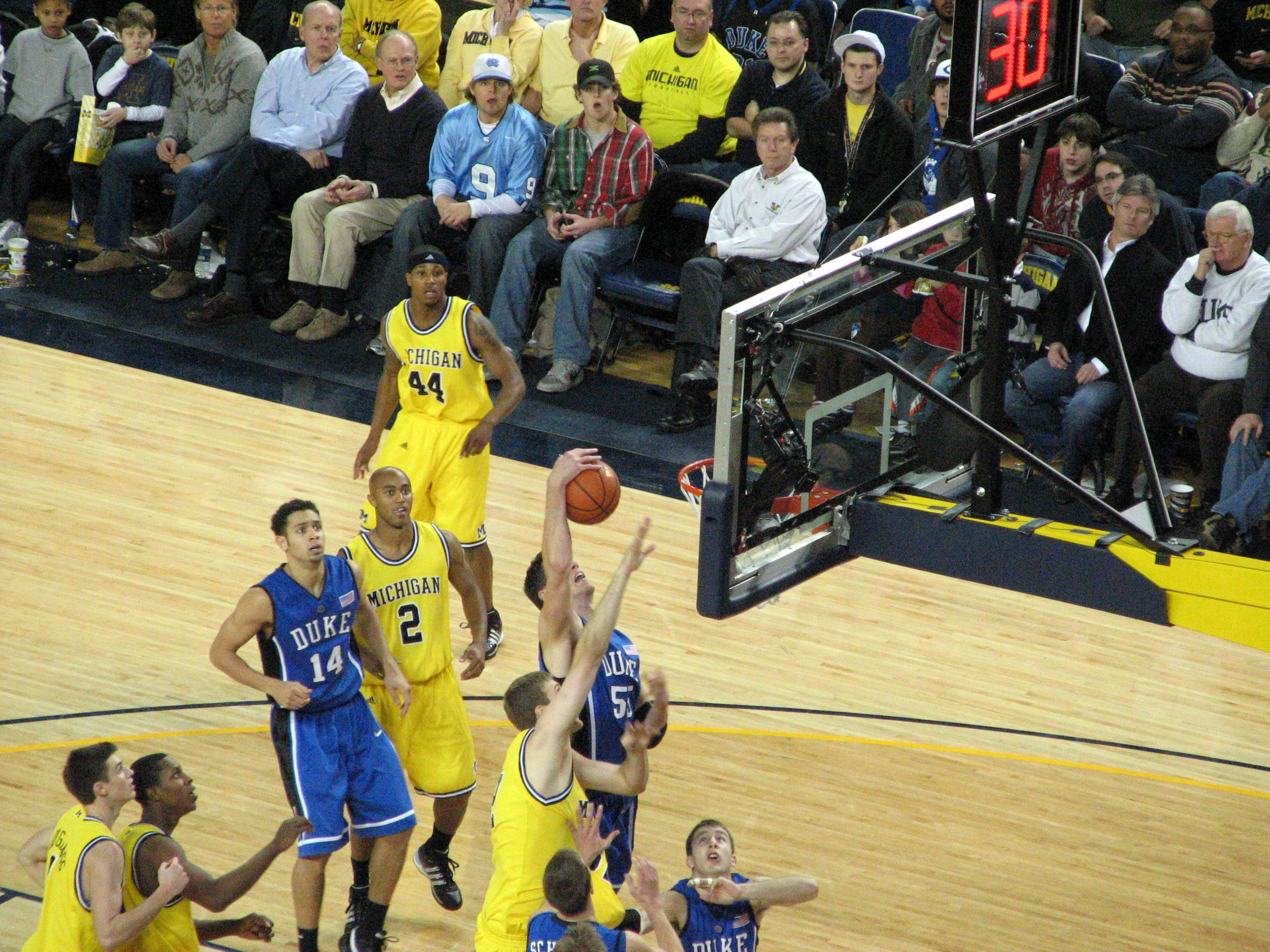
Gibson (32), Lee (2), Shepherd (22), Douglass (0), and Grady (44) in Duke rematch (2008-12-06)

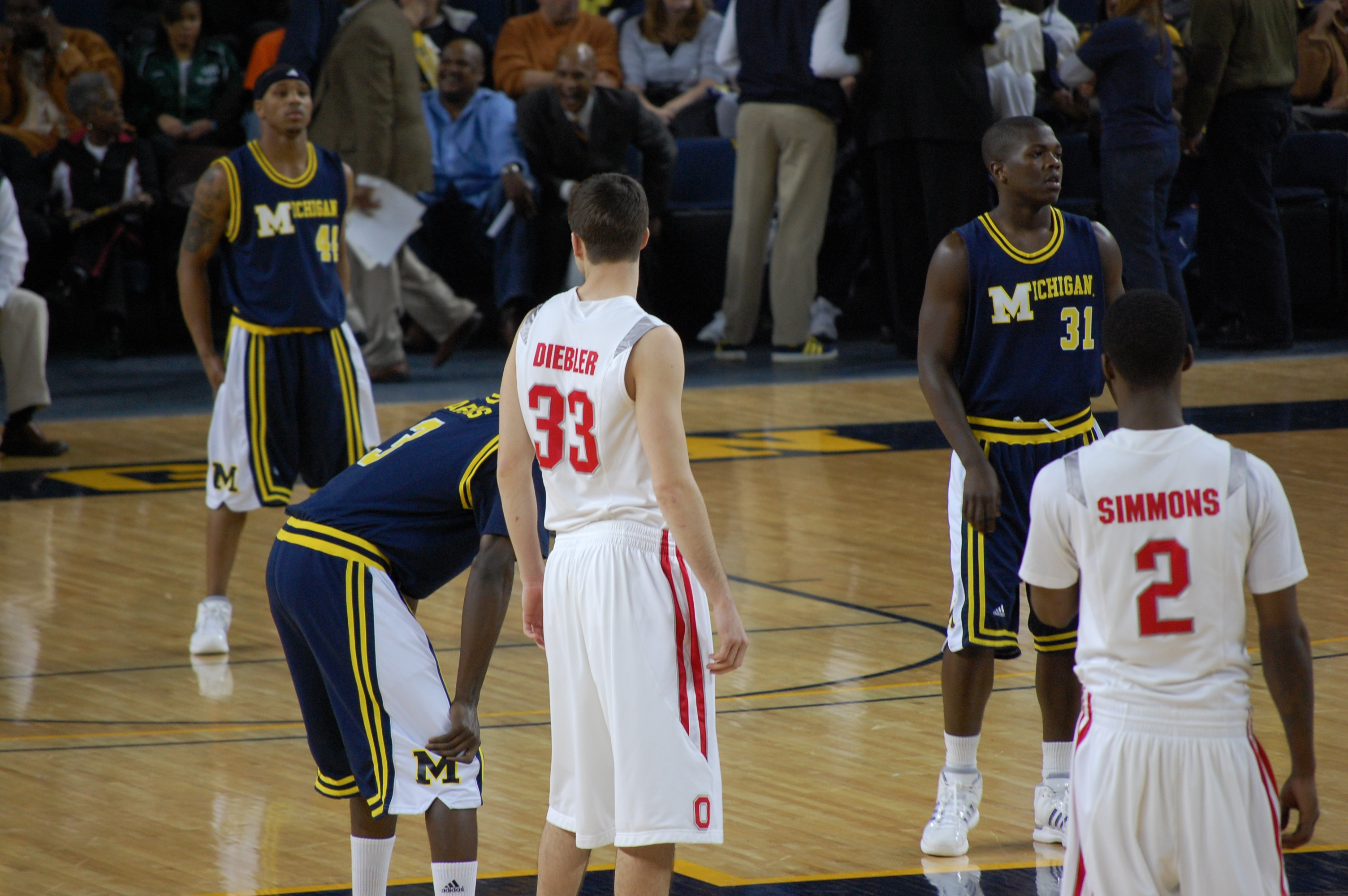
Lucas-Perry (31), Grady (44), and Harris (3) against Ohio State (2009-01-17)

On May 5, 2008, sophomore Ekpe Udoh, the Big Ten's top shotblocker, decided to transfer for his final two years of athletic eligibility. Beilein attempted to replace Udoh with Robin Benzing, a member of Germany's national youth team. However, Benzing failed to meet the NCAA's initial-eligibility guidelines and did not play. Beilein was able to partially solve the problem of complimenting Manny Harris by luring point guard Laval Lucas-Perry to transfer from Arizona. Perry became eligible to play at the conclusion of the fall semester. The team anticipated relying on 7-foot (2.1 m) freshman center Ben Cronin to make up for the loss of Udoh and Ron Coleman, who averaged over 21 minutes each of his four seasons. Including Cronin, the team had three incoming recruits.

Michigan granted two of its scholarships to fifth-year redshirt graduate students C.J. Lee and David Merritt in September. Lee and Merritt had both been 2007–08 Big Ten Academic All-Conference selections. The varsity roster included fourteen players, thirteen of whom saw live game action. In December, the Wolverines made the decision to redshirt Ben Cronin after only 10 minutes of play. He had hip surgery on January 14.

#	Name	Height	Weight	Position	Class	Hometown		Previous Team(s)
0	Zack Novak	6 ft 5 in (1.96 m)	210 pounds (95 kg)	G	Fr.	Chesterton, Indiana	U.S.	Chesterton Senior HS
1	Stu Douglass	6 ft 3 in (1.91 m)	175 pounds (79 kg)	G	Fr.	Carmel, Indiana	U.S.	Carmel High School
2	C.J. Lee	6 ft 0 in (1.83 m)	180 pounds (82 kg)	G	(redshirt) Sr.	Pittsford, New York	U.S.	Manhattan College
3	Manny Harris	6 ft 5 in (1.96 m)	185 pounds (84 kg)	G	So.	Detroit, Michigan	U.S.	Redford HS
12	Anthony Wright	6 ft 6 in (1.98 m)	235 pounds (107 kg)	F	(redshirt) So.	Sterling, Virginia	U.S.	Oak Hill Academy
15	David Merritt	5 ft 10 in (1.78 m)	170 pounds (77 kg)	G	(redshirt) Sr.	West Bloomfield, Michigan	U.S.	West Bloomfield HS
22	Jevohn Shepherd	6 ft 5 in (1.96 m)	215 pounds (98 kg)	F	Sr.	Toronto, Ontario	Canada	West Hill Collegiate Institute
23	Corey Person	6 ft 4 in (1.93 m)	200 pounds (91 kg)	G	Fr.	Kalamazoo, Michigan	U.S.	Kalamazoo Central HS
30	Eric Puls	6 ft 10 in (2.08 m)	210 pounds (95 kg)	C	(redshirt) Fr.	Alpena, Michigan	U.S.	Alpena HS
31	Laval Lucas-Perry	6 ft 3 in (1.91 m)	185 pounds (84 kg)	G	(redshirt) Fr	Flint, Michigan	U.S.	University of Arizona
34	Zack Gibson	6 ft 10 in (2.08 m)	220 pounds (100 kg)	F	(redshirt) Jr.	Grand Blanc, Michigan	U.S.	Rutgers University
34	DeShawn Sims	6 ft 8 in (2.03 m)	235 pounds (107 kg)	F	Jr.	Detroit, Michigan	U.S.	Pershing HS
35	Ben Cronin	7 ft 0 in (2.13 m)	265 pounds (120 kg)	C	Fr.	Syracuse, New York	U.S.	Henninger HS
44	Kelvin Grady	5 ft 11 in (1.80 m)	170 pounds (77 kg)	G	So.	Grand Rapids, Michigan	U.S.	East Grand Rapids HS

(redshirt) – denotes class status adjusted for used redshirt eligibility.

=== Incoming signees ===
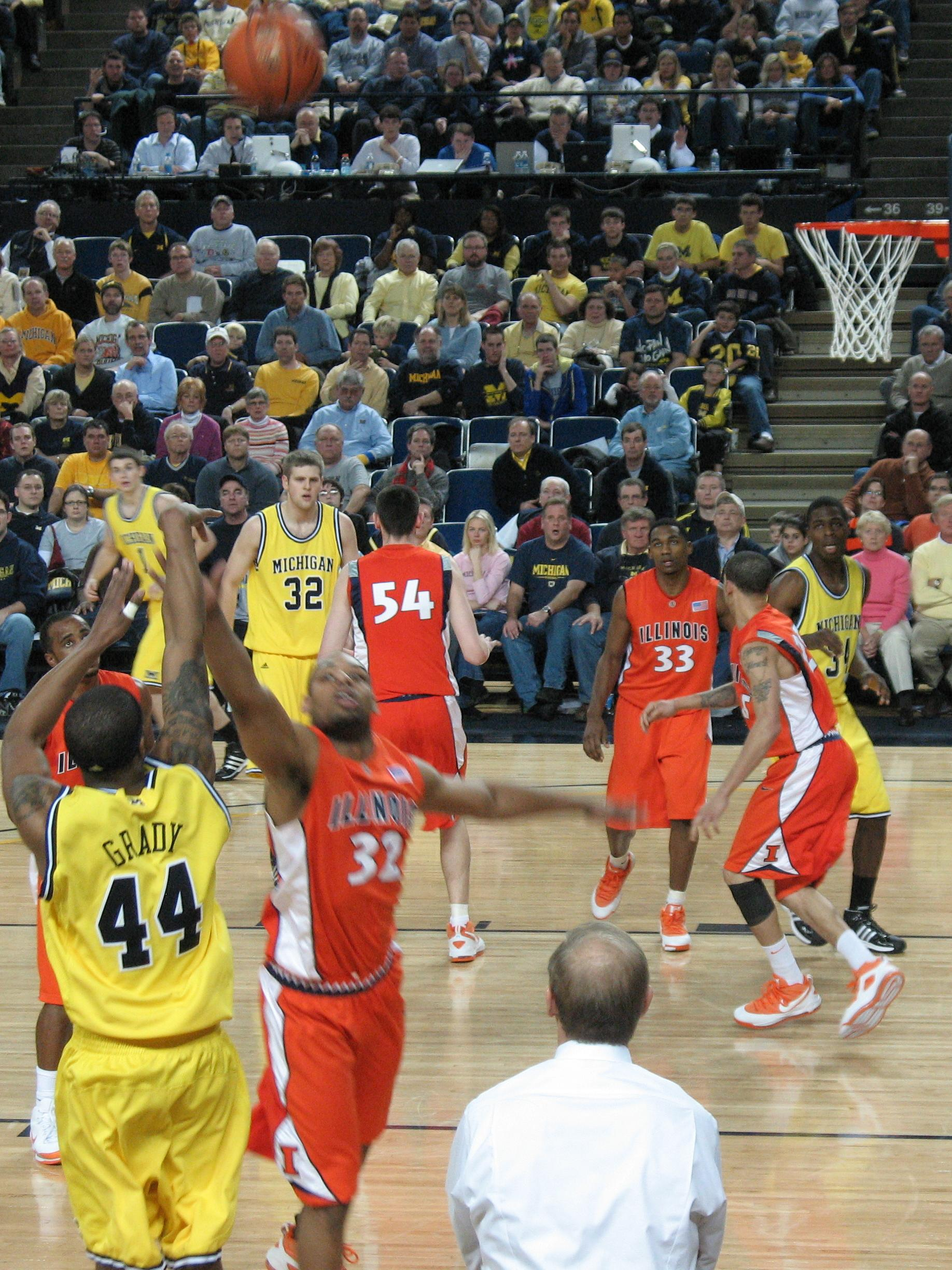
Grady shooting against Illinois (2009-01-04)

The incoming class had no four- or five-star recruits. However, it included three players that Rivals.com listed as three-star recruits. Only Ben Cronin was also listed as three-star by scout.com.

College recruiting information
Name	Hometown	School	Height	Weight	Commit date
Ben Cronin; C	Syracuse, New York	Henninger (NY)	7 ft 0 in (2.13 m)	242.5 lb (110.0 kg)	May 16, 2007
Ben Cronin; C	Recruit ratings: Scout: Rivals: (80)				
Stu Douglass; SG	Carmel, Indiana	Carmel High School (IN)	6 ft 2 in (1.88 m)	180 lb (82 kg)	Dec 9, 2007
Stu Douglass; SG	Recruit ratings: Scout: Rivals: (40)				
Zack Novak; SG	Chesterton, Indiana	Chesterton (IN)	6 ft 4.5 in (1.94 m)	220 lb (100 kg)	
Zack Novak; SG	Recruit ratings: Scout: Rivals: (40)				
Overall recruit ranking:
Note: In many cases, Scout, Rivals, 247Sports, On3, and ESPN may conflict in their listings of height and weight.; In these cases, the average was taken. ESPN grades are on a 100-point scale.; Sources: "Michigan Basketball Commitments". Rivals.; "2008 Michigan Basketball Commits". Scout.; "ESPN". ESPN.; "Scout.com Team Recruiting Rankings". Scout.; "2008 Team Ranking". Rivals.

=== Mid-season transfer ===
College recruiting information
Name	Hometown	School	Height	Weight	Commit date
Laval Lucas-Perry; PG	Flint, Michigan	Luke M. Powers Catholic (MI)	6 ft 1.5 in (1.87 m)	183 lb (83 kg)	Transfer
Laval Lucas-Perry; PG	Recruit ratings: Scout: Rivals: (92)				
Overall recruit ranking:
Note: In many cases, Scout, Rivals, 247Sports, On3, and ESPN may conflict in their listings of height and weight.; In these cases, the average was taken. ESPN grades are on a 100-point scale.; Sources: "Arizona Basketball Commitments". Rivals.; "2007 Arizona Basketball Commits". Scout.; "ESPN". ESPN.; "Scout.com Team Recruiting Rankings". Scout.; "2007 Team Ranking". Rivals.

=== 2009–10 team recruits ===
Incoming recruit Darius Morris and two Division I recruit teammates led Windward High School to the California Division V state title. Darius Morris received MVP of Olympic League, CIF Division 5A Southern Section Player of Year, and CIF Division 5A State Player of Year. Also Darius was awarded a John Wooden High School Player of the Year Award, received by Jrue Holiday the year before and the likes of Jason Kapono and Tayshaun Prince in the past.

Matt Vogrich won the Illinois Gatorade Player of the Year award, following in the footsteps of Derrick Rose and Jon Scheyer. Unlike Scheyer and Rose, he did not win Illinois Mr. Basketball. Kelvin Grady announced his intent to transfer at the end of the season.

College recruiting information
Name	Hometown	School	Height	Weight	Commit date
Darius Morris; PG	Los Angeles, California	Windward (CA)	6 ft 3 in (1.91 m)	170 lb (77 kg)	Nov 8, 2008
Darius Morris; PG	Recruit ratings: Scout: Rivals: (90)				
Matt Vogrich; SG	Lake Forest, Illinois	Lake Forest Academy (IL)	6 ft 3.5 in (1.92 m)	182.5 lb (82.8 kg)	May 10, 2008
Matt Vogrich; SG	Recruit ratings: Scout: Rivals: (89)				
Blake McLimans; PF	Hamburg (town), New York	Worcester Academy (MA)	6 ft 10 in (2.08 m)	210 lb (95 kg)	Oct 28, 2008
Blake McLimans; PF	Recruit ratings: Scout: Rivals: (85)				
Jordan Morgan; PF	Detroit, Michigan	University of Detroit Jesuit (MI)	6 ft 8 in (2.03 m)	242.5 lb (110.0 kg)	Dec 18, 2007
Jordan Morgan; PF	Recruit ratings: Scout: Rivals: (75)				
Overall recruit ranking:
Note: In many cases, Scout, Rivals, 247Sports, On3, and ESPN may conflict in their listings of height and weight.; In these cases, the average was taken. ESPN grades are on a 100-point scale.; Sources: "Michigan 2009 Basketball Commitments". Rivals.; "2009 Michigan Basketball Commits". Scout.; "ESPN". ESPN.; "Scout.com Team Recruiting Rankings". Scout.; "2009 Team Ranking". Rivals.

== Rankings ==
Ranking movements Legend: ██ Increase in ranking ██ Decrease in ranking — = Not ranked RV = Received votes
	Week																			
Poll	Pre	1	2	3	4	5	6	7	8	9	10	11	12	13	14	15	16	17	18	Final
AP	—	—	RV	RV	RV	RV	24	22	RV	25	RV	—	—	—	—	—	—	—	—	Not released
Coaches'	—	—	RV	RV	RV	RV	RV	24	RV	24	RV	—	—	—	—	—	—	—	—	RV

== Playing style ==
Over the course of the season, they developed a reputation for shooting a lot of three-point shots and for not turning over the basketball. The team ranked among the national leaders in three-point shots made per game. The ballhandling ability was a function of the Michigan lineup which often employed four guards and one center/forward, which meant that at any time the team had several adept ballhandlers on the court. By the end of the season, the starting lineup usually included four players 6 feet 5 inches (1.96 m) or shorter and Sims who is 6 feet 8 inches (2.03 m). As a team that relied on the three-point shot, it was streaky and was susceptible to hot and cold stretches. The team relied on a deep bench and had 10 players who averaged 10 minutes per game. Even the eleventh player averaged 9.6 minutes. The offense used patient ball movement with backdoor cutters and slashers, which necessitated that defenses chase shooters and peel off picks. The offense resulted in a shot mix that employed three-pointers for about 48% of its shots.

On defense, the team was known for employing Beilein's trademark trapping 1–3–1 halfcourt zone defense, which required opponents to be skilled at perimeter passing. The zone defense was generally employed after made baskets and dead-ball situations. After offensive misses or turnovers, the Wolverines relied on man-to-man defense. Depending on the matchups the team also used a 2–3 zone defense because the team did not have the type of athletes necessary to play on the wings of his 1–3–1. It employed the 1–3–1 less later in the season, and about ten percent of opponent possessions altogether. In total, the team used some sort of zone defense about 40 percent of the time. The team was also among the top 35 (of over 300) in the nation in terms of three-point shot defense.

== Accomplishments ==
On December 13, 2008, the team tied Dartmouth's current national record for most different players to make a three-point field goal in game set in 1993 when 9 players made three-point shots against Eastern Michigan. The team also set the current Big Ten Conference single-game three-point field goals attempted record of 42 on December 22, 2008, against Florida Gulf Coast and the conference games record of 40 on January 7, 2009, against Indiana. Over the course of the season the team set the current Big Ten Conference single-season three-point field goals attempted record if 912 as well as the single-season conference games record of 471. The team led the Big Ten Conference with 151 three-point field goals made in conference games.

The team set several school records. Its single-season total of 305 three-point field goals made surpassed the 1998 school record total of 260. This record was surpassed by the 2013–14 team. The team's single-game total of 16 three-point field goals made against Eastern Michigan on December 13, 2008, surpassed the school record 15 made on February 22, 1998. The team also established the school's single-season free throw percentage record of 75.7% (412–544) surpassed the 75.4% set in 2002.

== Season ==
=== Preconference ===
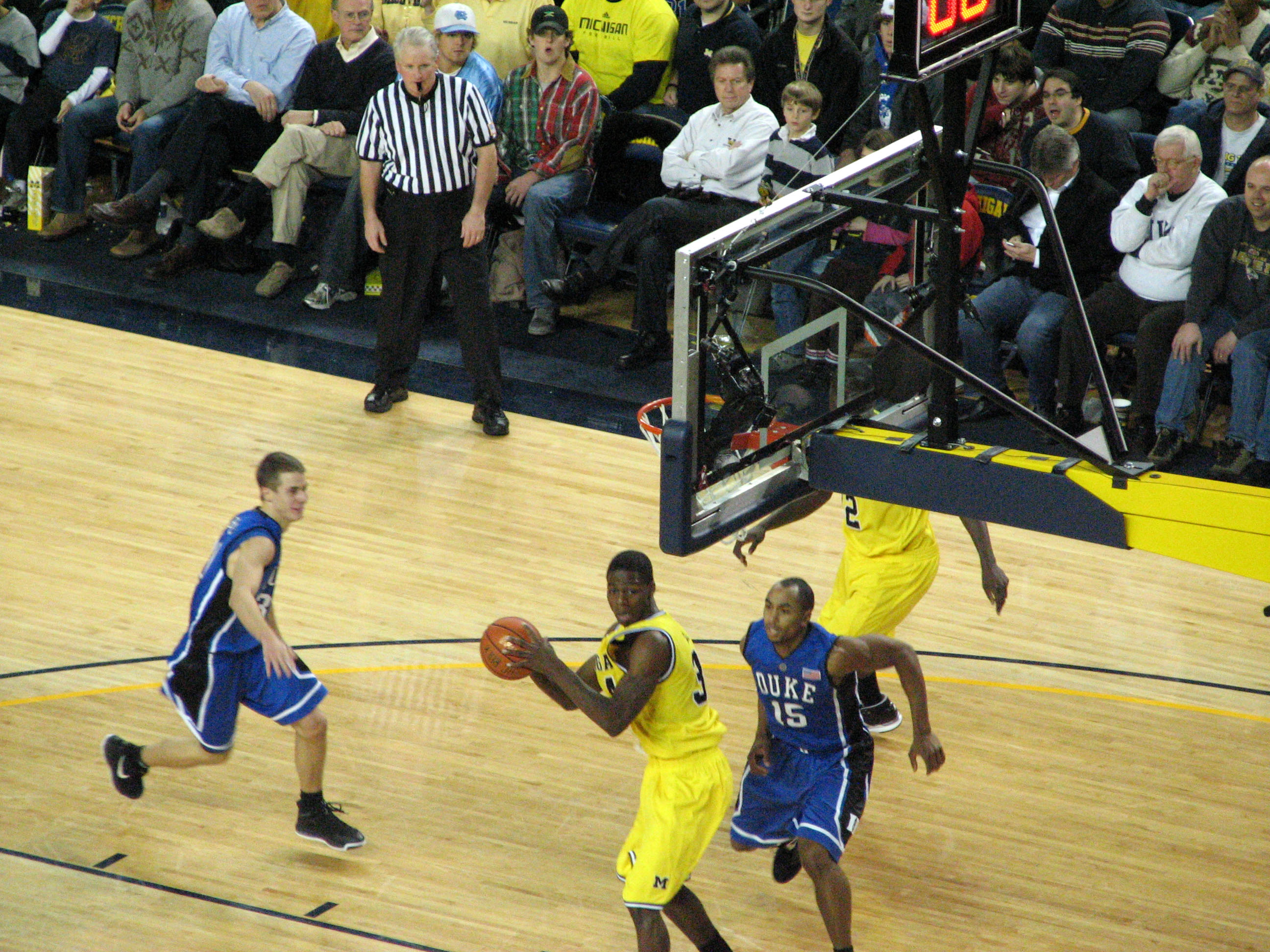
DeShawn Sims pivots against Gerald Henderson, Jr. in rematch victory against Duke

Although the Big Ten Network had a two and a half hour special that featured Midnight Madness events from several Big Ten campuses on October 17, 2008, the Michigan Wolverines were not a featured part of the show. Michigan began the season with Ben Cronin suffering from a torn acetabular labrum (hip joint) and considering redshirting. The team started its season as the host of a 2K Sports College Hoops Coaches Vs. Cancer Classic tournament regional in which they defeated the Michigan Tech Huskies and Northeastern Huskies at Crisler Arena. Manny Harris won the second Big Ten Player of the week award of his career for his performances during these games.

The first two victories qualified Michigan to appear in the tournament final four at the Madison Square Garden where the unranked Wolverines team upset the #4 ranked UCLA Bruins men's basketball team for its first win over a top-five team in eleven years on November 20, 2008. The 55–52 win also ended a twelve-game losing streak against ranked opponents. During the game, Michigan forced 17 UCLA turnovers with its 1–3–1 zone defense. Nonetheless, Michigan fell behind by as many as 10 points at one point in the game. In the first half, the Wolverines shot 31.3% from the field, and in the second half, they shot 61.9%, including 4 of 8 on three-point shots. Michigan trailed by two with 4 minutes and 16 seconds left before Stu Douglass made a three-point basket and Sims scored a few possessions later after a steal. In the final seconds UCLA's Nikola Dragovic hit a 3-point shot with five seconds left to reduce Michigan's four-point lead to one. Then UCLA sent Harris to the line where he made two free throws. In the final seconds Michigan defended an attack by Darren Collison who had his final shot blocked by Harris. At that point in the season, Michigan used DeShawn Sims as a sixth man. He played 28 minutes off the bench and led the team in scoring with 18 while being tied for the lead with 5 rebounds. Despite losing to #10 ranked (#5 in the Coaches' Poll) Duke the following night, the Wolverines began receiving votes in the 2008-09 NCAA Division I men's basketball rankings for the week of November 24.

The team earned a pair of non-conference victories against Norfolk State and Savannah State. In the Savannah St. game, Sims made a jump shot from the corner as time expired to win the game in overtime. Michigan had trailed by 20 at halftime, but scored the first 15 points of the second half. Next, the team was matched up against the Maryland in the ACC–Big Ten Challenge, where they lost on December 3. The Maryland game marked Sims' entry into the starting lineup.

On December 6, 2008, Michigan posted its second consecutive win over a top 5 opponent in a rematch against Duke with an 81–73 victory. The game included 11 lead changes and 16 ties. The close contest allowed the fans to play a part as they forced Duke to use a time out to quiet the noisy crowd late in the second half. The game, which had an attendance of 13,751, marked Michigan's 168th sellout and eighth consecutive as host to Duke. Sims, in his new starting role, led the way with 28 points (a career-high) and 12 rebounds. Novak contributed 14 off the bench including 4 for 7 on three-point shots. Gerald Henderson fouled out in only 19 minutes of play. Michigan trailed 53–50 with 8 minutes and 38 seconds remaining before Novak hit three-point shots on consecutive possessions to give Michigan the lead for good. Michigan built a 68–59 lead with 3 minutes and 7 seconds left. Then, Duke made four straight three-point shots while Michigan made 13 of its last 14 free throws to defend its lead. The fourth three-pointer cut the lead to 75–71 with 51.3 seconds remaining. The game was the first time Michigan had defeated multiple top five teams in the same season since 1986–87 when it upended fifth-ranked Syracuse, 91–88 (January 18, 1987), second-ranked Iowa, 100–92 (January 31, 1987), and third-ranked Purdue, 104–68 (March 7, 1987). At that point in the season, Michigan's two wins against top five teams were as many as the rest of the nation combined.

Then, after beating Eastern Michigan the following week, they welcomed Laval Lucas-Perry to the lineup as he contributed 14 points in 16 minutes of play in a victory over the Oakland Golden Grizzlies. Two days later on December 22, Michigan entered the Associated Press top 25 poll for the first time since February 6, 2006. Later that night in a victory over Florida-Gulf Coast, DeShawn Sims became the first Wolverine to score 20 points and add 20 rebounds since Phil Hubbard had 22 points and 26 rebounds in a victory over University of Detroit in the 1977 NCAA Division I men's basketball tournament. This performance earned him his second career Big Ten Player of the Week award. On December 29, the team entered the top 25 of the ESPN/USA Today Coaches Poll.

=== Big Ten season ===
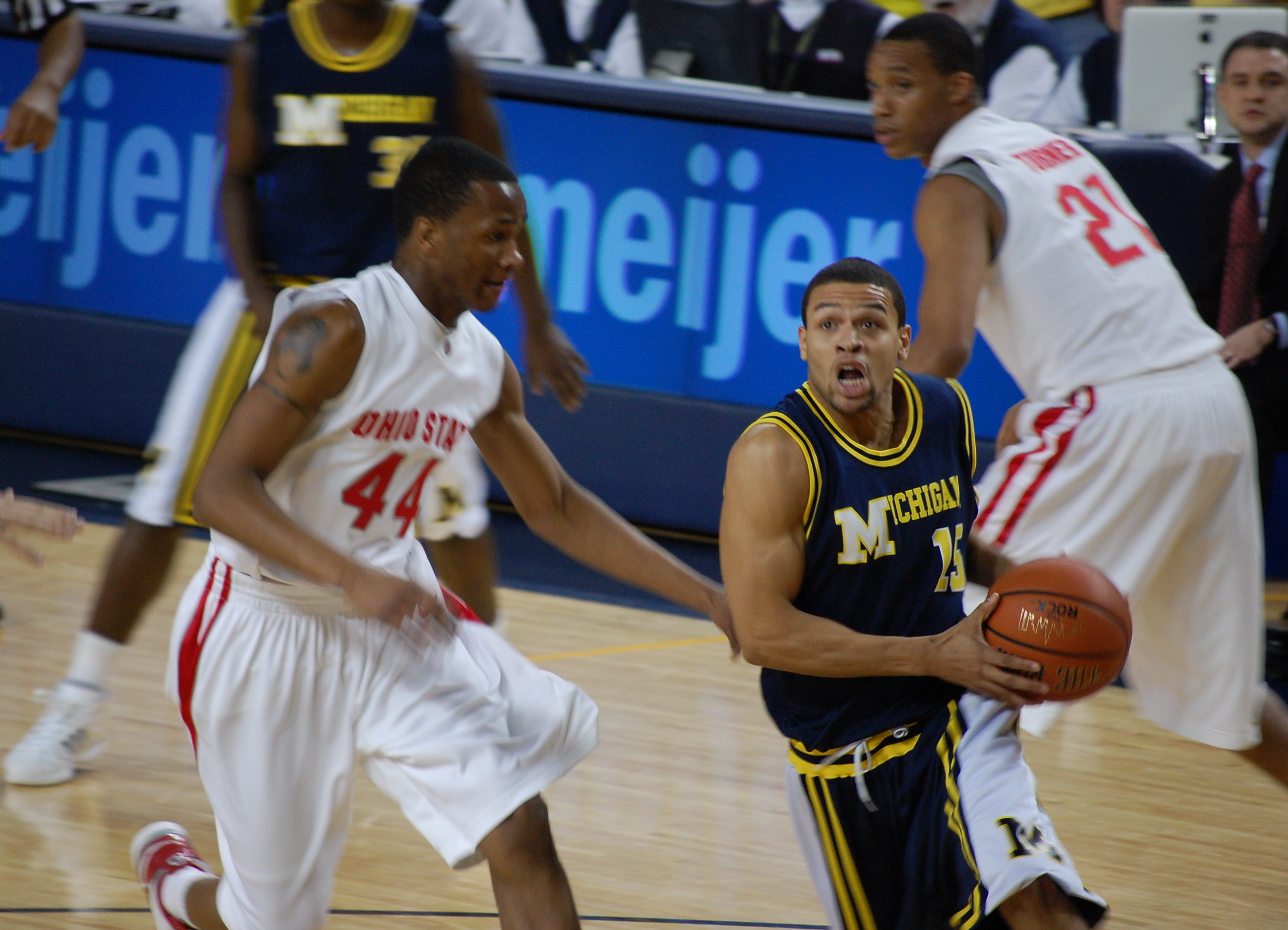
David Merritt drives against Ohio State in a 1989 Michigan Championship throwback uniform.

After a win over North Carolina Central, which gave the Wolverines ten wins to match its previous season's total, the team lost its Big Ten Conference opener against the Wisconsin Badgers on New Year's Eve. The win made Michigan the first ranked team that Wisconsin defeated during the season after three previous losses. During the game Zack Novak scored his season high 20 points, but Harris was held to 9 points and Wisconsin shot 58.7% from the field. On January 4, the team earned its first conference victory against the Illinois Fighting Illini when five player chipped in with double digit scoring efforts and the defense induced a low shooting percentage in the second half. The loss during the week caused Michigan to fall from the top 25 of both polls. Michigan rallied from a 20-point deficit against the Indiana Hoosiers to force overtime in which it prevailed on January 7. It was the team's first victory in Bloomington, Indiana since 1995. On January 11, defeated the Iowa Hawkeyes marking eight wins in nine games starting with the Duke upset. Michigan opened a 32–16 lead and was never challenged afterwards. Following the Indiana and Iowa victories, Michigan moved back into the top 25 in both polls (AP #25, ESPN/USAT #24).

Beilein stayed at 499 career wins at four-year academic institutions, as Michigan suffered its first consecutive losses of the season when its second conference loss, which came against Illinois on January 14, was followed by a loss to the Ohio State Buckeyes on January 17. The Illinois contest was a rematch from ten days earlier. After a 31–30 Michigan halftime lead resulting from 11 lead changes, Illinois shut down Michigan early in the second half to build a 57–45 lead with 5 minutes remaining. In the game, Michigan did not attempt a free throw until the last 1 minute and 45 seconds of the second half. Against Ohio State, Michigan struggled against a 1–2–2 zone early in the game and fell behind by 11 before closing to a 29–25 halftime deficit. Michigan took a 44–40 lead with eight minutes remaining, and the score was tied at 47 before Ohio State ran off 10 points in a row. The game was a twentieth year celebration of the last Wolverine national championship with all but two members of the 1989 NCAA Division I men's basketball tournament championship team in attendance as the team wore throwback uniforms. The consecutive losses caused the team to lose almost all of their support in the national rankings. On January 20, in a contest against Penn State that pitted the conferences two leading scorers (Harris and Talor Battle), Michigan shot 9 for 30 from the field in the first half including 2 for 16 on three-point shot attempts. They fell behind by as many as 23 points in the second half. The loss extended the losing streak to three games. Although Michigan rebounded with Beilein's 500th win in a January 24 victory over Northwestern in which they scored on their first five possessions and never looked back, they lost all support among the voters in the polls.

Michigan ended January with a pair of losses to Ohio State and Purdue. The Ohio State game was notable for Novak's flagrant foul and ejection for elbowing P.J. Hill in the face. Harris accumulated a triple double of sorts with 22 points, 12 rebounds and 10 turnovers. Against Purdue, Harris was held to single digit scoring for the third time in four games. During the game he was ejected for elbowing Purdue captain Chris Kramer in the nose, which spurred Purdue to a 40–20 run. Novak was ineligible due to an ejection in the prior game and Harris was ejected toward the beginning of the second half. On February 5, Harris was selected as a John R. Wooden Award 2008–09 Midseason Top 30 Candidate. After starting February play by snapping the two-game losing streak against Penn State on February 5, Michigan lost consecutive games to top ten opponents: Connecticut Huskies (#1) and Michigan State Spartans (#9). Harris posted a 28 points as Michigan rallied from a two-point halftime deficit to win by 20 against Penn State. Although Michigan confused Connecticut with a 2–3 zone defense instead of its normal 1–3–1 zone, which forced 10 first-half turnovers, Connecticut was victorious. The 11th double double of the season by Hasheem Thabeet helped Connecticut overcome only its second halftime deficit. Michigan stayed in the game in part due to six three-pointers by Stu Douglass. The loss against Michigan State marked 7 losses in 9 games for Michigan and gave Michigan State a 7–0 road record. On February 15, Michigan raised its record to 3–0 in overtime games in a victory over the Northwestern Wildcats on the road. Michigan took a 56–51 lead with 1 minute and 44 seconds left, but let it slip away. Michigan never trailed in the overtime. Then four days later, they posted their first consecutive win since a three-game streak from January 4 — 11 with a victory over the Minnesota Golden Gophers. In the game, Novak posted a career-best 6 three-pointers.

Michigan suffered an 80–70 overtime loss at the hands of ten-place Big Ten foe, Iowa, on February 22. Michigan had led 56–52 with 1 minute and 13 seconds remaining in regulation before allowing four straight free throws by Matt Gatens. The game was notable because Harris did not play during the overtime. At the time of the benching, Harris was in a battle with fellow sophomores Talor Battle and Evan Turner for the Big Ten Scoring leadership. Beilein commented on the benching: "That's what we had to do to make our team better now and in the future.". In the subsequent game against #16-ranked Purdue, Michigan won 87–78, raising its record to 3–4 against ranked opponents on the season. Harris was one of Michigan's leaders with 27 points and 8 rebounds, while Sims had a career-high 29 points. On March 1, Michigan lost to Wisconsin 60–55. After taking a 34–32 halftime lead, Michigan opened the second half shooting 1 for 12. Michigan closed the contest to a 52–50 game with 3 minutes and 55 seconds remaining. They stayed close as Wisconsin missed four of eight late free throws. Prior to the final game of the season, the Wolverines adopted the slogan "Queme los barcos," which means "burn the ships" and which had been used by 16th-century Spanish conquistador Hernando Cortez as a command to his troops to remind them that there was no turning back in their battle with the Aztec. The team traded in their traditional warmup jersey's for shirts with their adopted slogan. On March 7, they recovered from a 51–39 deficit to win their conference finale against Minnesota. Laval Lucas-Perry scored a career-high 19 points, including three straight three-pointers after Minnesota opened up the 12-point lead. Of the three teams that were ranked at the end of February and that Michigan had played twice (Duke, Illinois and Purdue), Michigan split the two games against each opponent, winning against each at home.

=== Postseason ===
Michigan concluded its regular season with a 19–12 (9–9 Big Ten) record. This earned the team a tie for seventh place in the conference standings with Minnesota. Since Michigan swept the season series with a February 19, 74–62 win at home and a March 7, 67–64 win at Minnesota, Michigan was seeded seventh in the 2009 Big Ten Conference men's basketball tournament held at the Conseco Fieldhouse in Indianapolis, Indiana while Minnesota was seeded eighth. During Championship Week, the Wolverines defeated the number ten seeded Iowa Hawkeyes on March 12 by a 73–45 margin. Sims helped Michigan open a 22–9 lead by scoring 16 of his 27 points in the first 10 minutes. Then the team lost to the number two seeded Illinois Fighting Illini on March 13. Sims scored 15 and Harris was held to 9.

Michigan continued to wear warmup shirts with the team slogan at the 2009 NCAA Division I men's basketball tournament. In the tournament, where Michigan earned the number 10 seed, the team defeated the Clemson Tigers 62–59 on March 19 in Kansas City. At one point, Michigan held a 16-point lead. After Harris gave Michigan a 58–43 lead with 5:51 remaining, Clemson had a 14–0 run to cut the deficit to 58–57 with 49 seconds left. Harris completed a three-point play on a driving layup with 37.4 second left. During the game, Clemson's top shooter Terrence Oglesby was ejected for a flagrant foul. The Wolverines lost in the second-round game played on March 21, 2009, to the 2-seeded Oklahoma in a 73–63. During the game four of Michigan's five starters who were trying to defend against Blake Griffin spent much of the game in foul trouble with Harris and Lee fouling out and Novak and Sims finishing with four fouls. Although Michigan tried a variety of defenders and various approaches such as doubling him, sagging in the lane, bumping him, Griffin still posted 33 points and 17 rebounds.

== Awards and honors ==
No Wolverines were drafted into the 2009 NBA draft after the season. Before, during and after the season, individual players earned the following awards and honors:

Manny Harris

- Preseason first-team All-Big Ten
- 11/17/09 Big Ten Player of the Week
- John R. Wooden Award 2008–09 Midseason Top 30 Candidate
- National Association of Basketball Coaches Division I All-District team
- U.S. Basketball Writers Association 2008–09 Men's District V All-District Team
- Postseason first-team All-Big Ten
- Big Ten Academic All-Conference

DeShawn Sims

- 12/22/08 Big Ten Player of the Week
- Postseason All-Big Ten second-team (media), third-team (coaches)

C. J. Lee

- Big Ten Sportsmanship Award (Michigan)
- Big Ten Academic All-Conference

David Merritt

- Big Ten Academic All-Conference

Laval Lucas-Perry

- Big Ten Academic All-Conference

=== Statistical leadership ===
Harris led the Big Ten in free throw percentage according to some sources who recognize a 2.5 free throws made per game minimum, but was considered second according to the conference website that uses a 2 FTM/game minimum. The NCAA recognizes a 2.5 attempts per game minimum. Thus, according to the Big Ten Gatens is the Conference Free Throw Champion and according to the NCAA Harris is the champion. Harris and Sims were both ranked among the leaders in the Conference in several statistics and divided the team leadership in most statistics. Harris led the Wolverines in points, minutes, assists, free throws made, free throw percentage and steals, while Sims led the team in field goal percentage, rebounds and blocked shots. Although Harris led the team in scoring for the season, Sims led the team in scoring in all its victories against ranked teams during the regular season and during the last five games before the NCAA tournament, while the team was on the bubble. However, Harris and Turner became the 4th and 5th players in conference history to finish in the top ten in the conference in average points, rebounds, and assists for a season since assists became a statistic in 1983–84, following Steve Smith, Jim Jackson, and Brian Evans. After, Harris was named team MVP, he requested that Sims be recognized as co-MVP. Sims was recognized as co-MVP.

The team posted the following statistics:

Name	GP	GS	Min	Avg	FG	FGA	FG%	3FG	3FGA	3FG%	FT	FTA	FT%	OR	DR	RB	Avg	Ast	Avg	PF	DQ	TO	Stl	Blk	Pts	Avg
Manny Harris	35	35	1133	32.4	181	436	0.415	52	159	0.327	176	204	0.863	62	175	237	6.8	154	4.4	72	1	110	43	18	590	16.9
DeShawn Sims	35	26	1079	30.8	224	444	0.504	26	82	0.317	66	93	0.710	86	152	238	6.8	26	0.7	76	3	46	40	27	540	15.4
Zack Novak	34	22	967	28.4	72	194	0.371	52	151	0.344	31	45	0.689	33	87	120	3.5	48	1.4	77	0	30	17	1	227	6.7
Stu Douglass	35	23	795	22.7	71	193	0.368	52	155	0.335	19	28	0.679	11	39	50	1.4	74	2.1	35	0	44	26	4	213	6.1
Laval Lucas-Perry	26	12	472	18.1	47	126	0.373	31	90	0.344	43	55	0.782	9	35	44	1.7	31	1.2	32	0	29	16	5	168	6.5
Zack Gibson	35	9	425	12.1	59	122	0.484	7	30	0.233	12	24	0.500	32	44	76	2.2	16	0.5	52	0	24	14	26	137	3.9
Kelvin Grady	32	8	582	18.2	44	118	0.373	30	83	0.361	17	24	0.708	7	36	43	1.3	60	1.9	26	0	24	15	1	135	4.2
C.J. Lee	35	14	572	16.3	32	77	0.416	19	52	0.365	17	26	0.654	16	51	67	1.9	58	1.7	65	1	24	19	0	100	2.9
Jevohn Shepherd	29	5	289	10.0	31	68	0.456	4	21	0.190	12	20	0.600	12	21	33	1.1	23	0.8	27	0	14	8	3	78	2.7
Anthony Wright	25	7	280	11.2	22	65	0.338	16	48	0.333	8	13	0.615	18	27	45	1.8	16	0.6	18	0	19	10	4	68	2.7
David Merritt	35	14	476	13.6	22	56	0.393	13	37	0.351	7	8	0.875	4	24	28	0.8	36	1.0	48	0	24	15	0	64	1.8
Eric Puls	11	0	20	1.8	5	7	0.714	3	4	0.750	0	0		2	0	2	0.2	0	0.0	4	0	1	0	2	13	1.2
Ben Cronin	2	0	10	5.0	2	4	0.500	0	0		4	4	1.000	1	4	5	2.5	0	0.0	1	0	0	0	1	8	4.0
TEAM	35													43	56	99	2.8			1		13				
Season Total	35				812	1910	0.425	305	912	0.334	412	544	0.757	336	751	1087	31.1	542	15.5	534	5	402	223	92	2341	66.9
Opponents	35				811	1864	0.435	196	631	0.311	395	545	0.725	374	828	1202	34.3	484	13.8	545		476	179	107	2213	63.2

== Schedule ==
2008–09 game log
November

Game	Date	Team	Score	High points	High rebounds	High assists	Location Attendance	Record
**Exhibition**
Ex.	November 6	Saginaw Valley State (exhibition)	81–55	DeShawn Sims – 19	**DeShawn Sims** – 9	**Stu Douglass** – 6	Crisler Arena, Ann Arbor, MI (6,701)	
**2008–09 NCAA Division I Regular Season**
1	November 11	Michigan Tech	77–55	**Manny Harris (1) – 30**	**Sims** (1) – 12	Stu Douglass (1) – 4	Crisler Arena, Ann Arbor, MI (6,328)	1–0
2	November 12	Northeastern	76–56	**Harris** (2) – 26	**Harris** (1) – 10	**Harris** (1) – 8	Crisler Arena, Ann Arbor, MI (6,246)	2–0
3	November 20	UCLA (#4)	55–52	**Sims** (1) – 18	Harris (2)/Sims (2) – 5	Douglass (2) – 4	Madison Square Garden, New York (9,440)	3–0
4	November 21	Duke (#10)	56–71	**Harris** (3) – 25	Zack Gibson (1) – 5	**Kelvin Grady** (1) – 6	Madison Square Garden, New York (12,543)	3–1
5	November 25	Norfolk State	83–49	**Harris** (4) – 16	**Harris** (3) – 15	**Grady** (2) – 5	Crisler Arena, Ann Arbor, MI (7,544)	4–1
6	November 29	Savannah State	66–64 (OT)	**Sims** (2) – 23	**Sims** (3) – 12	Harris (2) – 3	Crisler Arena, Ann Arbor, MI (8,190)	5–1

December

Game	Date	Team	Score	High points	High rebounds	High assists	Location Attendance	Record	7	December 3	@ Maryland	70–75	Manny Harris (5) – 15	DeShawn Sims (4) – 7	Harris (3)/Jevohn Shepherd (1) – 4	Comcast Center, College Park, MD (17,950)	5–2
8	December 6	Duke (#4)	81–73	**Sims** (3) – 28	**Sims** (5) – 12	Kelvin Grady (3) – 4	Crisler Arena, Ann Arbor, MI (13,751)	6–2									
9	December 13	Eastern Michigan	91–60	**Harris** (6) – 22	Harris (4) – 7	**Harris** (4) – 5	Crisler Arena, Ann Arbor, MI (9,768)	7–2									
10	December 20	@Oakland	89–76	Sims (4) – 20	Sims (6) – 9	**Harris** (5) – 13	The Palace of Auburn Hills, Auburn Hills, MI (10,113)	8–2									
11	December 22	Florida Gulf Coast	76–59	**Sims** (5) – 20	**Sims** (7) – 20	**Harris** (6) – 5	Crisler Arena, Ann Arbor, MI (8,279)	9–2									
12	December 29	North Carolina Central	77–57	**Harris** (7) – 29	Harris (5) – 16	**Harris** (7) – 7	Crisler Arena, Ann Arbor, MI (10,390)	10–2									
**2008–09 Big Ten Conference Season**
13	December 31	Wisconsin	61–73	**Zack Novak** (1) – 20	**Novak** (1) – 8	Harris (8) – 3	Crisler Arena, Ann Arbor, MI (11,046)	10–3 (0–1)									

January

Game	Date	Team	Score	High points	High rebounds	High assists	Location Attendance	Record	14	January 4	Illinois	74–64	**Manny Harris** (8) – 16	**DeShawn Sims** (8) – 9	Harris (9)/Laval Lucas-Perry (1) – 5	Crisler Arena, Ann Arbor, MI (12,912)	11–3 (1–1)
15	January 7	@Indiana	72–66 (OT)	**Lucas-Perry** (1) – 18	**Harris** (6) – 11	Kelvin Grady (4) – 4	Assembly Hall, Bloomington, IN (11,044)	12–3 (2–1)									
16	January 11	Iowa	64–49	**Harris** (9) – 18	**Harris** (7) – 8	**Harris** (10) – 5	Crisler Arena, Ann Arbor, MI (11,835)	13–3 (3–1)									
17	January 14	@Illinois	51–66	Harris (10) – 20	**Zack Novak** (2) – 9	Harris (11) – 3	Assembly Hall, Champaign, IL (15,535)	13–4 (3–2)									
18	January 17	Ohio State	58–65	**Harris** (11) – 21	Harris (8) – 7	**Harris** (12) – 6	Crisler Arena, Ann Arbor, MI (13,751)	13–5 (3–3)									
19	January 20	@Penn State	58–73	**Sims** (6) – 21	**Sims** (9) – 11	Douglass (3) – 3	Bryce Jordan Center, State College, PA (8,730)	13–6 (3–4)									
20	January 24	Northwestern	68–59	Sims (7) – 15	**Harris** (9) – 12	Harris (13)/C.J. Lee (1)/Lucas-Perry (2) – 4	Crisler Arena, Ann Arbor, MI (11,468)	14–6 (4–4)									
21	January 28	@Ohio State	54–72	Harris (12) – 22	**Harris** (10) – 12	Grady (5)/Harris (14)/Lee (2) – 3	Value City Arena Columbus, OH (16,363)	14–7 (4–5)									
22	January 31	@Purdue (#16)	49–67	Sims (8)/Jevohn Shepherd (1) – 10	Sims (10) – 5	**Grady (6)/Stu Douglass (4)** – 4	Mackey Arena, West Lafayette, IN ()	14–8 (4–6)									

February

Game	Date	Team	Score	High points	High rebounds	High assists	Location Attendance	Record	23	February 5	Penn State	71–51	**Manny Harris** (13) – 28	DeShawn Sims (11) – 7	**Harris** (15) – 7	Crisler Arena, Ann Arbor, MI (10,134)	15–8 (5–6)
24	February 7	@Connecticut (#1)	61–69	**Stu Douglass** (1) – 20	Zack Gibson (1)/Harris (11)/Sims (12) – 4	Harris (16) – 5	Harry A. Gampel Pavilion, Storrs, CT (10,167)	15–9 (5–6)									
25	February 10	Michigan State (#9)	42–54	**Sims** (9) – 18	Harris (12) – 7	Harris (17)/Zack Novak (1) – 3	Crisler Arena, Ann Arbor, MI (13,751)	15–10 (5–7)									
26	February 15	@ Northwestern	70–67 (OT)	**Harris** (14) – 26	Novak (3) – 7	**Stu Douglass** (5) – 4	Welsh-Ryan Arena, Evanston, IL (7,234)	16–10 (6–7)									
27	February 19	Minnesota	74–62	**Novak** (2) – 18	**Sims** (13) – 8	**C. J. Lee** (3) – 4	Crisler Arena, Ann Arbor, MI (10,520)	17–10 (7–7)									
28	February 22	@Iowa	60–70 (OT)	Stu Douglass (2) – 14	Sims (14) – 8	Harris (18) – 6	Carver-Hawkeye Arena, Iowa City, IA (14,462)	17–11 (7–8)									
29	February 26	Purdue (#16)	87–78	**Sims** (10) – 29	**Harris** (13) – 8	Stu Douglass (6)/Harris (19) – 4	Crisler Arena, Ann Arbor, MI (13,751)	18–11 (8–8)									

March

Game	Date	Team	Score	High points	High rebounds	High assists	Location Attendance	Record	30	March 1	@Wisconsin	55–60	DeShawn Sims (11) – 17	Manny Harris (14) – 8	C. J. Lee (4) – 4	Kohl Center, Madison, WI (17,230)	18–12 (8–9)
31	March 7	@Minnesota	67–64	**Sims** (12) – 24	Zack Gibson (2)/Harris (15)/Laval Lucas-Perry (1)/Sims (15) – 2	**Harris** (20) – 6	Williams Arena, Minneapolis, MN (14,625)	19–12 (9–9)									
**2009 Big Ten Conference men's basketball tournament**
32/BT1	March 12	Iowa	73–45	**Sims** (13) – 27	**Harris** (16) – 7	**Harris** (21) – 8	Conseco Fieldhouse, Indianapolis, IN	20–12 (9–9)									
33/BT2	March 13	Illinois	50–60	Sims (14) – 15	Sims (16) – 8	Harris (22) – 4	Conseco Fieldhouse, Indianapolis, IN	20–13 (9–9)									
**2009 NCAA Division I men's basketball tournament**
34/NCAA1	March 19	Clemson (#24)	62–59	**Harris** (15) – 23	Harris (17) – 7	**Harris** (23) – 6	Sprint Center, Kansas City, Missouri	21–13 (9–9)									
35/NCAA2	March 21	Oklahoma (#7)	63–73	Sims (15)/Anthony Wright (1) – 14	Sims (17) – 6	Harris (24) – 3	Sprint Center, Kansas City, Missouri	21–14 (9–9)									

2015–16 season schedule

Bold text indicates game high; (nth time player led stat)
