= 2007–08 Longwood Lancers men's basketball team =

American college basketball season

2007–08 Longwood Lancers men's basketball
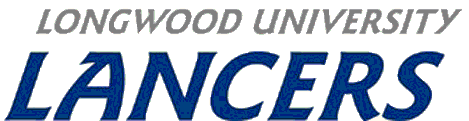
- Conference: Independent
- Record: 9–22
- Head coach: Mike Gillian (5th season)
- Assistant coaches: Bill Reinson (6th season); Doug Thibault (5th season); Tim Fudd (1st season)
- Home arena: Willett Hall

2007–08 NCAA Division I men's basketball independents standings
	Conf.				Overall
Team	W		L	PCT	W		L	PCT
Texas–Pan American		–		–	18	–	13	.581
Utah Valley State		–		–	15	–	14	.517
Savannah State		–		–	13	–	18	.419
Chicago State		–		–	11	–	17	.393
Longwood		–		–	9	–	22	.290
Cal State Bakersfield		–		–	8	–	21	.276
Presbyterian		–		–	5	–	25	.167
North Carolina Central		–		–	4	–	26	.133
NJIT		–		–	0	–	29	.000
Rankings from AP Poll

The 2007–08 Longwood Lancers men's basketball team represented Longwood University during the 2007–08 NCAA Division I men's basketball season. The team was led by fifth-year head coach Mike Gillian, and played their home games at Willett Hall as a Division I independent school.

== Last season ==
The Lancers had a record of 9–22 in their last season of reclassification from Division II to Division I.

== Roster ==
2007–08 Longwood Lancers men's basketball team
Players
Coaches

Pos.	#	Name	Height	Weight	Year	Previous school	Hometown
C	1	Beno Jaekel	6 ft 9 in (2.06 m)	245 lb (111 kg)	So	Universitario/Western Nebraska CC	Jussara, Brazil
F	2	Kirk Williams	6 ft 6 in (1.98 m)	200 lb (91 kg)	Jr	Woodlands HS	White Plains, New York
G	3	E.J. Dawson	6 ft 2 in (1.88 m)	180 lb (82 kg)	So	Mount Vernon HS	Alexandria, Virginia
G	10	Brandon Giles	5 ft 10 in (1.78 m)	155 lb (70 kg)	Sr	Magruder HS	Gaithersburg, Maryland
G	11	Earl Gee II	5 ft 10 in (1.78 m)	155 lb (70 kg)	Fr	Manchester HS	Chesterfield, Virginia
F	12	Billy Robinson, Jr.	6 ft 7 in (2.01 m)	195 lb (88 kg)	So	Hammond, HS	Columbia, Maryland
G/F	22	Dana Smith	6 ft 5 in (1.96 m)	230 lb (104 kg)	Jr	C. D. Hylton HS	Woodbridge, Virginia
G	23	Ryan Bogan	6 ft 1 in (1.85 m)	200 lb (91 kg)	Jr	Oxford Area HS/Harcum College	Oxford, Pennsylvania
G	24	Kevin Swecker	6 ft 1 in (1.85 m)	175 lb (79 kg)	So	Mount Saint Joseph HS	Manchester, Maryland
G	25	Durann Neil	6 ft 1 in (1.85 m)	195 lb (88 kg)	Fr	Leap Academy	Pleasantville, New Jersey
F	31	Jeffrey Ryan	6 ft 7 in (2.01 m)	175 lb (79 kg)	Fr	Newburgh	Beacon, New York
F	42	Brandon Evans	6 ft 9 in (2.06 m)	170 lb (77 kg)	Fr	Roanoke Catholic School	Roanoke, Virginia
C	44	Danny Wilson	6 ft 8 in (2.03 m)	230 lb (104 kg)	Sr	Northside HS/Louisburg	Pantego, North Carolina
F	50	Lamar Barrett	6 ft 6 in (1.98 m)	205 lb (93 kg)	Sr	St. Andrew's School	Providence, Rhode Island

Head coach

- Mike Gillian (North Adams State)

Assistant coach(es)

- Bill Reinson (Phoenix)
- Doug Thibault (Boise State)
- Tim Fudd (American)

Legend

- (C) Team captain
- (S) Suspended
- (I) Ineligible
- (W) Walk-on
- Injured
- Current redshirt

Roster
Last update: March 7, 2015

== Schedule ==
Date time, TV	Opponent	Result	Record	Site (attendance) city, state
Regular season
November 9*; 7:30 pm, no	Navy	L 72–88	0–1	Willett Hall (1,609); Farmville, VA
November 13*; 7:00 pm, no	Norfolk State	W 80–67	1–1	Willett Hall (1,113); Farmville, VA
November 15*; 7:00 pm, no	Virginia–Wise	W 89–67	2–1	Willett Hall (1,015); Farmville, VA
November 18*; 12:00 pm, no	at No. 8 Indiana; Chicago Invitational Challenge	L 49–100	2–2	Assembly Hall (17,275); Bloomington, IN
November 20*; 7:00 pm, no	at Kent State; Chicago Invitational Challenge	L 62–80	2–3	Memorial Athletic and Convocation Center (2,875); Kent, OH
November 23*; 1:00 pm, no	vs. UNC Wilmington; Chicago Invitational Challenge	L 65–80	2–4	Sears Centre; Hoffman Estates, IL
November 24*; 12:30 pm, no	vs. Southeast Missouri State; Chicago Invitational Challenge	L 78–82	2–5	Sears Centre; Hoffman Estates, IL
November 27*; 7:00 pm, no	at Liberty	L 67–91	2–6	Vines Center (1,630); Lynchburg, VA
December 1*; 2:00 pm, no	High Point	L 68–80	2–7	Willett Hall (801); Farmville, VA
December 5*; 7:00 pm, no	at James Madison	L 52–84	2–8	JMU Convocation Center (3,152); Harrisonburg, VA
December 7*; 7:00 pm, no	at Virginia	L 57–76	2–9	John Paul Jones Arena (11,366); Charlottesville, VA
December 15*; 7:30 pm, no	at VCU	L 45–78	2–10	Siegel Center (4,877); Richmond, VA
December 17*; 7:00 pm, no	Virginia Intermont	W 79–73 ^{OT}	3–10	Willett Hall (217); Farmville, VA
December 21*; 7:00 pm, no	at Morgan State	L 51–76	3–11	Talmadge L. Hill Field House (603); Baltimore, MD
December 23*; 2:00 pm, no	at George Washington	L 54–63	3–12	Charles E. Smith Center (2,505); Washington, DC
December 29*; 2:00 pm, no	Stetson	W 78–76	4–12	Willett Hall (229); Farmville, VA
January 2*; 7:00 pm, no	at Boston College	L 52–81	4–13	Conte Forum (3,107); Chestnut Hill, MA
January 5*; 7:00 pm, no	at Navy	L 55–73	4–14	Alumni Hall (1,450); Annapolis, MD
January 8*; 7:00 pm, no	Yale	L 73–78	4–15	Willett Hall (308); Farmville, VA
January 15*; 8:00 pm, no	Campbell	L 80–82	4–16	Willett Hall (1,015); Farmville, VA
January 19*; 2:00 pm, no	at Savannah State	L 67–79	4–17	Tiger Arena (513); Savannah, GA
January 21*; 7:00 pm, no	at Stetson	L 60–68	4–18	Edmunds Center (1,875); Deland, FL
January 24*; 7:00 pm, no	at High Point	L 54–68	4–19	Millis Athletic Convocation Center (1,089); High Point, NC
January 28*; 7:00 pm, no	at Hofstra	L 60–75	4–20	Hofstra Arena (2,037); Hempstead, NY
January 31*; 7:00 pm, no	Southern Virginia	W 102–73	5–20	Willett Hall (731); Farmville, VA
February 4*; 7:00 pm, no	at NJIT	W 78–68	6–20	Fleisher Center (130); Newark, NJ
February 9*; 2:00 pm, no	Savannah State	L 66–69 ^{OT}	6–21	Willett Hall (1,209); Farmville, VA
February 11*; 7:00 pm, no	at Florida Atlantic	L 69–93	6–22	FAU Arena (806); Boca Raton, FL
February 13*; 7:00 pm, no	at Campbell	W 83–80	7–22	Pope Convocation Center (888); Buies Creek, NC
February 18*; 7:00 pm, no	NJIT	W 96–78	8–22	Willett Hall (618); Farmville, VA
February 22*; 7:00 pm, no	Liberty	W 79–68	9–22	Willett Hall (1,622); Farmville, VA
*Non-conference game. (#) Tournament seedings in parentheses. All times are in Eastern Time.
