= Roanoke Catholic School =

Catholic school in Virginia, US

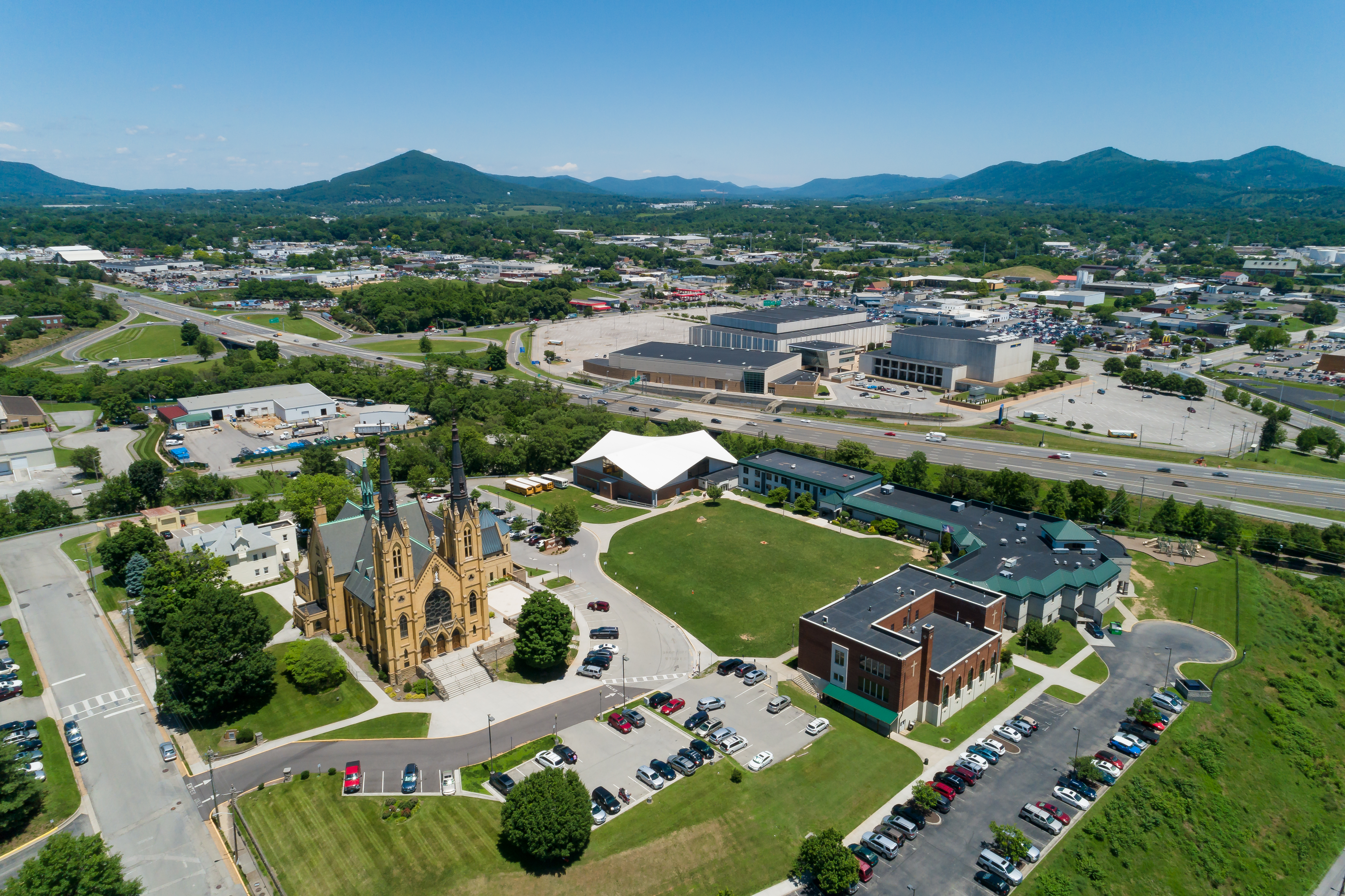

Location
- 621 North Jefferson Street; Roanoke, Virginia 24016; United States; 37°16′42″N 79°56′23″W

Information
- Type: Private, catholic, college preparatory
- Religious affiliation: Catholic Church
- Established: 1889
- Status: open
- Oversight: Diocese of Richmond
- Principal: Megan Potter
- Teaching staff: 47.4 (on an FTE basis)
- Grades: PK–12
- Gender: Co-educational
- Enrollment: 482 (2017-18)
- Student to teacher ratio: 9.6
- Campus type: Suburban
- Colors: Green, White, Gold
- Athletics: 26 Athletic teams
- Athletics conference: Virginia Independent Conference (VIC); Blue Ridge Conference (BRC)
- Sports: baseball, basketball, cheerleading, cross country, football, golf, lacrosse, soccer, softball, swimming, track, wrestling
- Nickname: Celtics
- Rivals: North Cross School
- Accreditation: Cognia
- Newspaper: The Friar Rambler
- School fees: $250 (application) $150 (technology) $50 (home & school association) $250 (athletic)
- Tuition: $10,725–$12,625 (2024–2025)
- Website: www.roanokecatholic.com

Roanoke Catholic School is a private, co-educational, Catholic college preparatory school located in Roanoke, Virginia, United States.

== Demographics ==
The demographic breakdown of the 456 K-12 students enrolled for 2017-18 was:

- Asian - 7.9%
- Black - 3.7%
- Hispanic - 13.6%
- White - 71.7%
- Multiracial - 3.1%

== Notable alumni ==
- James Carpenter, college football defensive tackle for the Indiana Hoosiers
