= 2008–09 NCAA Division I men's basketball season =

Basketball season

- Preseason AP No. 1: North Carolina Tar Heels
- Regular season: November 10, 2008– March 10, 2009
- NCAA Tournament: 2009
- Tournament dates: March 17 – April 6, 2009
- National Championship: Ford Field; Detroit, Michigan
- NCAA Champions: North Carolina Tar Heels
- Other champions: Penn State Nittany Lions (NIT), Oregon State Beavers (CBI), Old Dominion Monarchs (CIT)
- Player of the Year (Naismith, Wooden): Blake Griffin, Oklahoma Sooners

The 2008–09 NCAA Division I men's basketball season began on November 10, 2008, and ended with the 2009 NCAA Division I men's basketball tournament's championship game on April 6, 2009, at Ford Field in Detroit, Michigan. The season saw six different teams achieve the AP #1 ranking during the year (just one shy of the NCAA record). Oklahoma sophomore Blake Griffin was the dominant individual performer, sweeping National Player of the Year honors. The season began with North Carolina becoming the first unanimous preseason #1 team, and ended with the Tar Heels dominating the NCAA tournament en route to their fifth NCAA title. UNC won its six NCAA tournament games by double digits, and by an average of 19.8 points per game. Junior Wayne Ellington was named Final Four Most Outstanding Player.

== Season headlines ==
- The North Carolina Tar Heels became the first team in history to be the unanimous #1 team in the AP preseason poll. The ranking came based on UNC returning the majority of their Final Four squad from the year before, most notably Tyler Hansbrough, who became the first reigning National player of the year to return to school since Shaquille O'Neal in the 1991–92 season.
- Blake Griffin was named the Associated Press, the John Wooden Award, the Naismith Award and the Sporting News player of the year for the 2008–2009 college basketball season. When combined with Sam Bradford's Heisman Trophy, Oklahoma became the first school to have a top winner in both basketball and football in the same year.
- Pittsburgh achieved the #1 ranking for the first time in school history on January 5, 2009.
- On December 18, Tyler Hansbrough passed Phil Ford to become North Carolina's all-time leading scorer. On February 28, Hansbrough also broke Dickie Hemric's NCAA record for most free throws made in a career. And on March 19, Hansbrough passed JJ Redick as the leading scorer in Atlantic Coast Conference history.
- Jodie Meeks of Kentucky scored 54 points against Tennessee on January 13, 2009. Meeks was 10–15 from 3-pt range. The output broke Kentucky's single-game scoring record, set by Hall of Famer Dan Issel 39 years before.
- 2009 marked the first time in history that three #1 seeds in the NCAA tournament came from the same conference – as Louisville, Pittsburgh and Connecticut of the Big East achieved the feat.
- Two retired Hall of Fame coaches died during the season – UTEP's Don Haskins on September 7, 2008, and California's Pete Newell on November 17, 2008. Newell's Bears won the NCAA championship in 1959, while Haskins' Miners won the title in 1966 in a historic win over Kentucky.
- The preseason AP All-American team was named on November 3. Tyler Hansbrough of North Carolina was the unanimous leading vote-getter (72 of 72 votes). The rest of the team included Stephen Curry of Davidson (66 votes), Luke Harangody of Notre Dame (58), Darren Collison of UCLA (46) and Blake Griffin of Oklahoma (45).
- Kenny George of UNC Asheville, the tallest player in Division I (7'7") and the nation's leader in FG% for 2007–08, had part of his right foot amputated before the start of the season, threatening to end his career.
- The New Jersey Institute of Technology broke a 51-game losing streak that stretched back to February 19, 2007, by defeating Bryant 61–51 on January 21.
- Travis and Chavis Holmes of VMI became the highest-scoring twins in NCAA Division I history.
- Ryan Toolson of Utah Valley had the highest single-game scoring mark of the season, netting 63 points in a 123–121 quadruple-overtime win over Chicago State on January 29, 2009. Chicago State teammates David Holston and John Cantrell each scored over 40 points in the loss.
- On January 31, Texas's A. J. Abrams hit his 339th 3-point shot, breaking the previous Big 12 record of 338 held by Jeff Boschee of Kansas. In the same game, Kansas State's Denis Clemente tied his former teammate Michael Beasley's Big 12 single-game scoring record, netting 44 points in an 85–81 overtime win for the Wildcats.
- North Dakota State became the first men's team in Division I or its predecessors to reach the NCAA Tournament in its first year of postseason eligibility since 1972, when Southwestern Louisiana, now Louisiana-Lafayette, accomplished this feat. The Bison reached the "Big Dance" by defeating Oakland in the final of the 2009 Summit League tournament on March 10.
- Syracuse upset Connecticut, 127–117, in a six-overtime game in the Big East Conference tournament Quarterfinals that started on March 12 and ended after midnight on March 13. It was the longest game in Big East history, and second longest in NCAA Division I history, at 70 total playing minutes.
- Davidson guard Stephen Curry, Boston College guard Tyrese Rice, Miami (FL) guard Jack McClinton, Florida State guard Toney Douglas, Temple guard Dionte Christmas, UAB guard Robert Vaden, Wyoming guard Brandon Ewing, Chicago State guard David Holston, UTEP guard Stefon Jackson, Central Florida guard Jermaine Taylor, North Dakota State guard Ben Woodside, VMI guard Chavis Holmes, East Tennessee State guard Courtney Pigram and Coppin State guard Tywain McKee each eclipsed the career 2000-point mark during the season.
- Arkansas State changed its nickname from the "Indians" to the "Red Wolves", effective this season.
- Bryant University and Southern Illinois University Edwardsville competed at the Division I level for the first time, while Houston Baptist returned to Division I play after a 20-year absence and Seattle after 28 years.
- Conference realignments: Gardner-Webb moved from the Atlantic Sun Conference to the Big South Conference, while Presbyterian competes in the Big South as well after playing as an independent in 2007–08. Samford moved from the Ohio Valley Conference to the Southern Conference.
- Don Meyer passed Bob Knight as the winningest coach in NCAA history, breaking Knight's record of 902 victories.
- Syracuse coach Jim Boeheim led the Orange to 20 wins for the 31st time in his career, a new record. Boeheim had previously been tied with Dean Smith at 30 20-win seasons.
- Connecticut coach Jim Calhoun won his 800th career game, beating Marquette on February 25, 2009.
- After the season, Northeastern's basketball program was placed on probation until 2011 due to recruiting and extra-benefits violations.
- Centenary became the first men's basketball to receive a postseason ban due to their poor showing against Academic Progress Rate (APR) standards. The Gentlemen will not be eligible for postseason play for the 2009–10 season.
- 27,767,111 fans attended Division I games during the season, the second-highest all-time for the division.
- Larry Bird, Magic Johnson, Jud Heathcote, Wayman Tisdale, Gene Bartow, Travis Grant, Walter Byers and Bill Wall were inducted into the National Collegiate Basketball Hall of Fame.
- During the 2008–09 Big Ten season, Evan Turner and Manny Harris became the 4th and 5th players to finish in the top ten in the Big Ten Conference in average points rebounds and assists in the same season since assists became a statistic in 1983–84. Harris is the first to finish in the top six in each one. Turner would finish in the top two the following year.
- Harvard beats Boston College for its first-ever win against a ranked opponent. During the 2008–09 Ivy League season, Harvard's Jeremy Lin was the only NCAA Division I men's college basketball player who ranked in the top ten in his conference for scoring (17.8), rebounding (5.5), assists (4.3), steals (2.4), blocked shots (0.6), field goal percentage (0.502), free throw percentage (0.744), and 3-point shot percentage (0.400).
- Bradley played in the 2009 CollegeInsider.com Postseason Tournament, becoming the first school to play in four different postseaon tournaments in four consecutive years. The Braves previously had played in the 2006 NCAA tournament, the 2007 National Invitation Tournament, and the 2008 College Basketball Invitational.

== Major rule changes ==
Beginning in 2008–2009, the following rules changes were implemented:

- The three-point line moved from 19 feet, 9 inches to 20 feet, 9 inches.
- If the entire ball is above the rim when it comes into contact with the backboard and is subsequently touched by a player, it is goaltending. Previously only a ball moving downward after hitting the backboard could be subject to goaltending.

== Season outlook ==
=== Pre-season polls ===
The top 25 from the AP and ESPN/USA Today Coaches Polls, October 31, 2008.

'Associated Press'
Ranking	Team
1	North Carolina (72)
2	Connecticut
3	Louisville
4	UCLA
5	Pittsburgh
6	Michigan State
7	Texas
8	Duke
9	Notre Dame
10	Gonzaga
11	Purdue
12	Oklahoma
13	Memphis
14	Tennessee
15	Arizona State
16	Marquette
17	Miami (FL)
18	USC
19	Florida
20	Davidson
21	Wake Forest
22	Georgetown
23	Villanova
24	Kansas
25	Wisconsin

ESPN/USA Today Coaches
Ranking	Team
1	North Carolina (31)
2	Connecticut
3	Louisville
4	UCLA
5	Duke
6	Pittsburgh
7	Michigan State
8	Texas
9	Notre Dame
10	Purdue
11	Gonzaga
12	Memphis
13	Tennessee
14	Oklahoma
15	Arizona State
16	Miami (FL)
17	Marquette
18	Georgetown
19	Florida
20	Davidson
21	USC
22	Wisconsin
23	Kansas
24	Wake Forest
25	Villanova

== Conference membership changes ==
These schools joined new conferences for the 2008–09 season.

School	Former conference	New conference
Bryant Bulldogs	Northeast-10 Conference (D-II)	NCAA Division I Independent
Gardner–Webb Runnin' Bulldogs	Atlantic Sun Conference	Big South Conference
Houston Baptist Huskies	NAIA independent	NCAA Division I Independent
North Dakota Fighting Sioux	North Central Conference (D-II)	NCAA Division I Independent
Presbyterian Blue Hose	NCAA Division I independent	Big South Conference
Samford Bulldogs	Ohio Valley Conference	Southern Conference
Seattle Redhawks	Great Northwest Athletic Conference (D-II)	NCAA Division I Independent
Southern Illinois University (SIU) Edwardsville Cougars	Great Lakes Valley Conference (D-II)	NCAA Division I Independent
South Dakota Coyotes	North Central Conference (D-II)	NCAA Division I Independent

== Regular season ==
=== Early-season tournaments ===
Name	Dates	Num. teams	Championship
Coaches vs. Cancer Classic	Nov. 10–21	16	Duke 71 vs. Michigan 57
Charleston Classic	Nov. 14–16	8	Clemson 76 vs. Temple 72
CBE Classic	Nov. 14–25	4*	Syracuse 89 vs. Kansas 81
NIT Season Tip-Off	Nov. 17–28	16	Oklahoma 87 vs. Purdue 82
Puerto Rico Tip-Off	Nov. 20–23	8	Xavier 63 vs. Memphis 58
Paradise Jam Tournament	Nov. 21–24	8	Connecticut 76 vs. Wisconsin 57
Maui Invitational Tournament	Nov. 24–26	8	UNC 102 vs. Notre Dame 87
Great Alaska Shootout	Nov. 26–29	8	San Diego State 76 vs. Hampton 47
76 Classic	Nov. 27–30	8	Wake Forest 87 vs. Baylor 74
Old Spice Classic	Nov. 27–30	8	Gonzaga 83 vs. Tennessee 74
Las Vegas Invitational	Nov. 28–29	4*	Kentucky 54 vs. West Virginia 43
Legends Classic	Nov. 28–29	4*	Pittsburgh 57 vs. Washington State 43
Cancún Challenge	Nov. 29–30	4*	Vanderbilt 71 vs. VCU 66

- Although these tournaments technically had more teams involved, only four play for the championship.

=== Conferences ===
==== Conference winners and tournaments ====
Thirty conference seasons concluded with a single-elimination tournament. The teams in each conference that won their regular-season conference title received the number one seed in each tournament. Conference tournament winners received an automatic bid to the 2009 NCAA Division I men's basketball tournament. The Ivy League was the only NCAA Division I conference that did not hold a conference tournament, instead sending its regular-season champion, Cornell, to the NCAA tournament.

Conference	Regular season winner	Conference player of the year	Conference tournament	Tournament venue (City)	Tournament Winner
America East Conference	Binghamton & Vermont	Marqus Blakely, Vermont	2009 America East men's basketball tournament	SEFCU Arena (Albany, New York); Final at campus site	Binghamton
Atlantic 10 Conference	Xavier	Ahmad Nivins, St. Joseph's	2009 Atlantic 10 men's basketball tournament	Boardwalk Hall (Atlantic City, New Jersey)	Temple
Atlantic Coast Conference	North Carolina	Ty Lawson, North Carolina	2009 ACC men's basketball tournament	Georgia Dome (Atlanta)	Duke
Atlantic Sun Conference	Jacksonville	Alex Renfroe, Belmont	2009 Atlantic Sun men's basketball tournament	Allen Arena (Nashville, Tennessee)	East Tennessee State
Big 12 Conference	Kansas	Blake Griffin, Oklahoma	2009 Big 12 men's basketball tournament	Ford Center (Oklahoma City)	Missouri
Big East Conference	Louisville	Hasheem Thabeet, Connecticut & DeJuan Blair, Pittsburgh	2009 Big East men's basketball tournament	Madison Square Garden (New York City)	Louisville
Big Sky Conference	Weber State	Kellen McCoy, Weber State	2009 Big Sky men's basketball tournament	Campus Sites	Portland State
Big South Conference	Radford	Artsiom Parakhouski, Radford	2009 Big South Conference men's basketball tournament	Campus Sites	Radford
Big Ten Conference	Michigan State	Kalin Lucas, Michigan State	2009 Big Ten Conference men's basketball tournament	Conseco Fieldhouse (Indianapolis, Indiana)	Purdue
Big West Conference	Cal State Northridge	Josh Akognon, Cal State Fullerton	2009 Big West Conference men's basketball tournament	Anaheim Convention Center (Anaheim, California)	Cal State Northridge
Colonial Athletic Association	VCU	Eric Maynor, VCU	2009 CAA men's basketball tournament	Richmond Coliseum (Richmond, Virginia)	VCU
Conference USA	Memphis	Jermaine Taylor, Central Florida	2009 Conference USA men's basketball tournament	FedExForum (Memphis, Tennessee)	Memphis
Horizon League	Butler	Matt Howard, Butler	2009 Horizon League men's basketball tournament	Campus Sites	Cleveland State
Ivy League	Cornell	Alex Barnett, Dartmouth	No Tournament		
Metro Atlantic Athletic Conference	Siena	Kenny Hasbrouck, Siena	2009 MAAC men's basketball tournament	Times Union Center (Albany, New York)	Siena
Mid-American Conference	Buffalo & Bowling Green (East); Ball State, Central Michigan & Western Michigan (West)	Michael Bramos, Miami	2009 MAC men's basketball tournament	Quicken Loans Arena (Cleveland, Ohio)	Akron
Mid-Eastern Athletic Conference	Morgan State	Tywain McKee, Coppin State	2009 MEAC men's basketball tournament	Lawrence Joel Veterans Memorial Coliseum (Winston-Salem, North Carolina)	Morgan State
Missouri Valley Conference	Creighton & Northern Iowa	Booker Woodfox, Creighton	2009 Missouri Valley Conference men's basketball tournament	Scottrade Center (St. Louis, Missouri)	Northern Iowa
Mountain West Conference	BYU, Utah & New Mexico	Luke Nevill, Utah	2009 Mountain West Conference men's basketball tournament	Thomas & Mack Center (Las Vegas, Nevada)	Utah
Northeast Conference	Robert Morris	Jeremy Chappell, Robert Morris	2009 Northeast Conference men's basketball tournament	Campus Sites	Robert Morris
Ohio Valley Conference	Tennessee-Martin	Lester Hudson, Tennessee-Martin	2009 Ohio Valley Conference men's basketball tournament	First round at campus sites, Final Four at Sommet Center (Nashville, Tennessee)	Morehead State
Pacific-10 Conference	Washington	James Harden, Arizona State	2009 Pacific-10 Conference men's basketball tournament	Staples Center (Los Angeles)	USC
Patriot League	American	Derrick Mercer, American	2009 Patriot League men's basketball tournament	Campus Sites	American
Southeastern Conference	South Carolina & Tennessee (East) LSU (West)	Marcus Thornton, LSU	2009 SEC men's basketball tournament	St. Pete Times Forum (Tampa, Florida)	Mississippi State
Southern Conference	Western Carolina & Chattanooga (North); Davidson (South)	Stephen Curry, Davidson	2009 Southern Conference men's basketball tournament	McKenzie Arena (Chattanooga, Tennessee)	Chattanooga
Southland Conference	Stephen F. Austin (East) Sam Houston State (West)	Matt Kingsley, Stephen F. Austin	2009 Southland Conference men's basketball tournament	Leonard E. Merrell Center (Katy, Texas)	Stephen F. Austin
Southwestern Athletic Conference	Alabama State	Brandon Brooks, Alabama State	2009 SWAC men's basketball tournament	Fair Park Arena (Birmingham, Alabama)	Alabama State
The Summit League	North Dakota State	Ben Woodside, North Dakota State	2009 Summit League men's basketball tournament	Sioux Falls Arena (Sioux Falls, South Dakota)	North Dakota State
Sun Belt Conference	Western Kentucky (East); Arkansas–Little Rock (West)	Orlando Mendez-Valdez, Western Kentucky	2009 Sun Belt Conference men's basketball tournament	Summit Arena (Hot Springs, Arkansas) (Except First Round)	Western Kentucky
West Coast Conference	Gonzaga	John Bryant, Santa Clara	2009 West Coast Conference men's basketball tournament	Orleans Arena (Las Vegas, Nevada)	Gonzaga
Western Athletic Conference	Utah State	Gary Wilkinson, Utah State	2009 WAC men's basketball tournament	Lawlor Events Center (Reno, Nevada)	Utah State

==== Conference standings ====
2008–09 America East men's basketball standings
	Conf.				Overall
Team	W		L	PCT	W		L	PCT
Binghamton †	13	–	3	.813	23	–	9	.719
Vermont	13	–	3	.813	24	–	9	.727
Boston University	11	–	5	.688	17	–	13	.567
New Hampshire	8	–	8	.500	14	–	16	.467
Stony Brook	8	–	8	.500	16	–	14	.533
UMBC	7	–	9	.438	15	–	17	.469
Albany	6	–	10	.375	15	–	16	.484
Maine	4	–	12	.250	9	–	21	.300
Hartford	2	–	14	.125	7	–	26	.212
† America East tournament winner As of March 20, 2009; Rankings from AP Poll

2008–09 Atlantic 10 men's basketball standings
	Conf.				Overall
Team	W		L	PCT	W		L	PCT
No. 20 Xavier	12	–	4	.750	27	–	8	.771
Dayton	11	–	5	.688	27	–	8	.771
Rhode Island	11	–	5	.688	23	–	11	.676
Temple†	11	–	5	.688	22	–	12	.647
Duquesne	9	–	7	.563	21	–	13	.618
La Salle	9	–	7	.563	18	–	13	.581
Richmond	9	–	7	.563	20	–	16	.556
Saint Joseph's	9	–	7	.563	17	–	15	.531
Saint Louis	8	–	8	.500	18	–	14	.563
UMass	7	–	9	.438	12	–	18	.400
St. Bonaventure	6	–	10	.375	15	–	15	.500
Charlotte	5	–	11	.313	11	–	20	.355
George Washington	4	–	12	.250	10	–	18	.357
Fordham	1	–	15	.063	3	–	25	.107
† 2009 Atlantic 10 Tournament winner Rankings from AP Poll

2008–09 ACC men's basketball standings
	Conf.				Overall
Team	W		L	PCT	W		L	PCT
No. 2 North Carolina	13	–	3	.813	34	–	4	.895
No. 6 Duke†	11	–	5	.688	30	–	7	.811
No. 12 Wake Forest	11	–	5	.688	24	–	7	.774
No. 16 Florida State	10	–	6	.625	25	–	10	.714
No. 24 Clemson	9	–	7	.563	23	–	9	.719
Boston College	9	–	7	.563	22	–	12	.647
Maryland	7	–	9	.438	21	–	14	.600
Virginia Tech	7	–	9	.438	19	–	15	.559
Miami (FL)	7	–	9	.438	19	–	13	.594
NC State	6	–	10	.375	16	–	14	.533
Virginia	4	–	12	.250	10	–	18	.357
Georgia Tech	2	–	14	.125	12	–	19	.387
† 2009 ACC tournament winner Rankings from AP Poll

2008–09 Atlantic Sun men's basketball standings
	Conf.				Overall
Team	W		L	PCT	W		L	PCT
Jacksonville	15	–	5	.750	18	–	14	.563
East Tennessee State †	14	–	6	.700	23	–	11	.676
Belmont	14	–	6	.700	20	–	13	.606
Lipscomb	12	–	8	.600	17	–	14	.548
Mercer	11	–	9	.550	17	–	15	.531
Campbell	11	–	9	.550	14	–	16	.467
Stetson	9	–	11	.450	13	–	17	.433
USC Upstate	8	–	12	.400	9	–	21	.300
Florida Gulf Coast	7	–	13	.350	11	–	20	.355
North Florida	6	–	14	.300	8	–	22	.267
Kennesaw State	3	–	17	.150	7	–	22	.241
† 2009 Atlantic Sun Tournament winner As of March 2, 2009; Rankings from AP Poll

2008–09 Big East men's basketball standings
	Conf.				Overall
Team	W		L	PCT	W		L	PCT
No. 1 Louisville†	16	–	2	.889	31	–	6	.838
No. 4 Pittsburgh	15	–	3	.833	31	–	5	.861
No. 5 Connecticut	15	–	3	.833	31	–	5	.861
No. 11 Villanova	13	–	5	.722	30	–	8	.789
No. 23 Marquette	12	–	6	.667	25	–	10	.714
No. 13 Syracuse	11	–	7	.611	28	–	10	.737
West Virginia	10	–	8	.556	23	–	12	.657
Providence	10	–	8	.556	19	–	14	.576
Notre Dame	8	–	10	.444	21	–	15	.583
Cincinnati	8	–	10	.444	18	–	14	.563
Seton Hall	7	–	11	.389	17	–	15	.531
Georgetown	7	–	11	.389	16	–	15	.516
St. John's	6	–	12	.333	16	–	18	.471
South Florida	4	–	14	.222	9	–	22	.290
Rutgers	2	–	16	.111	11	–	21	.344
DePaul	0	–	18	.000	9	–	24	.273
† 2009 Big East tournament winner As of April 4, 2009; Rankings from AP Poll

2008–09 Big Sky men's basketball standings
	Conf.				Overall
Team	W		L	PCT	W		L	PCT
Weber State	15	–	1	.938	21	–	10	.677
Portland State †	11	–	5	.688	23	–	10	.697
Montana	11	–	5	.688	17	–	12	.586
Idaho State	9	–	7	.563	13	–	19	.406
Northern Colorado	8	–	8	.500	14	–	18	.438
Montana State	6	–	10	.375	14	–	17	.452
Eastern Washington	6	–	10	.375	12	–	18	.400
Northern Arizona	5	–	11	.313	8	–	19	.296
Sacramento State	1	–	15	.063	2	–	27	.069
† 2009 Big Sky tournament winner Rankings from AP Poll

2008–09 Big South men's basketball standings
	Conf.				Overall
Team	W		L	PCT	W		L	PCT
Radford †	15	–	3	.833	21	–	12	.636
VMI	13	–	5	.722	24	–	8	.750
Liberty	12	–	6	.667	23	–	12	.657
UNC Asheville	10	–	8	.556	15	–	16	.484
Winthrop	9	–	9	.500	11	–	19	.367
Gardner–Webb	9	–	9	.500	13	–	17	.433
Presbyterian	9	–	9	.500	12	–	17	.414
Coastal Carolina	5	–	13	.278	11	–	20	.355
High Point	4	–	14	.222	9	–	21	.300
Charleston Southern	4	–	14	.222	9	–	20	.310
† 2009 Big South tournament winner As of March 7, 2009; Rankings from AP Poll

2008–09 Big Ten Conference men's basketball standings
	Conf.				Overall
Team	W		L	PCT	W		L	PCT
No. 8 Michigan State	15	–	3	.833	31	–	7	.816
No. 17 Purdue†	11	–	7	.611	27	–	10	.730
Illinois	11	–	7	.611	24	–	10	.706
Penn State	10	–	8	.556	27	–	11	.711
Ohio State	10	–	8	.556	22	–	11	.667
Wisconsin	10	–	8	.556	20	–	13	.606
Minnesota	9	–	9	.500	22	–	11	.667
Michigan	9	–	9	.500	21	–	14	.600
Northwestern	8	–	10	.444	17	–	14	.548
Iowa	5	–	13	.278	15	–	17	.469
Indiana	1	–	17	.056	6	–	25	.194
† 2009 Big Ten tournament winner Rankings from AP poll

2008–09 Big 12 men's basketball standings
	Conf.				Overall
Team	W		L	PCT	W		L	PCT
No. 14 Kansas	14	–	2	.875	27	–	8	.771
No. 7 Oklahoma	13	–	3	.813	30	–	6	.833
No. 9 Missouri †	12	–	4	.750	31	–	7	.816
Kansas State	9	–	7	.563	22	–	12	.647
Texas	9	–	7	.563	23	–	12	.657
Texas A&M	9	–	7	.563	24	–	10	.706
Oklahoma State	9	–	7	.563	23	–	12	.657
Nebraska	8	–	8	.500	18	–	13	.581
Baylor	5	–	11	.313	24	–	15	.615
Iowa State	4	–	12	.250	15	–	17	.469
Texas Tech	3	–	13	.188	14	–	19	.424
Colorado	1	–	15	.063	9	–	22	.290
† 2009 Big 12 Tournament winner Rankings from AP poll

2008–09 Big West men's basketball standings
	Conf.				Overall
Team	W		L	PCT	W		L	PCT
Cal State Northridge †	11	–	5	.688	17	–	14	.548
Pacific	10	–	6	.625	21	–	13	.618
Long Beach State	10	–	6	.625	15	–	15	.500
UC Riverside	8	–	8	.500	17	–	13	.567
UC Santa Barbara	8	–	8	.500	16	–	15	.516
UC Irvine	8	–	8	.500	12	–	19	.387
Cal State Fullerton	7	–	9	.438	15	–	17	.469
UC Davis	7	–	9	.438	13	–	19	.406
Cal Poly	3	–	13	.188	7	–	21	.250
† 2009 Big West tournament winner As of April 10, 2009; Rankings from AP poll

2008–09 CAA men's basketball standings
	Conf.				Overall
Team	W		L	PCT	W		L	PCT
VCU †	14	–	4	.778	24	–	10	.706
George Mason	13	–	5	.722	22	–	11	.667
Old Dominion	12	–	6	.667	25	–	10	.714
Northeastern	12	–	6	.667	19	–	13	.594
Hofstra	11	–	7	.611	21	–	11	.656
Drexel	10	–	8	.556	15	–	14	.517
James Madison	9	–	9	.500	21	–	15	.583
Georgia State	8	–	10	.444	12	–	20	.375
Delaware	6	–	12	.333	13	–	19	.406
William & Mary	5	–	13	.278	10	–	20	.333
Towson	5	–	13	.278	12	–	22	.353
UNC Wilmington	3	–	15	.167	7	–	25	.219
† 2009 CAA tournament winner Rankings from AP poll

2008–09 Conference USA men's basketball standings
	Conf.				Overall
Team	W		L	PCT	W		L	PCT
No. 3 Memphis †	16	–	0	1.000	33	–	4	.892
Tulsa	12	–	4	.750	25	–	11	.694
UAB	11	–	5	.688	22	–	12	.647
Houston	10	–	6	.625	21	–	12	.636
UTEP	10	–	6	.625	23	–	14	.622
Marshall	7	–	9	.438	15	–	17	.469
Tulane	7	–	9	.438	14	–	17	.452
East Carolina	5	–	11	.313	13	–	17	.433
Southern Miss	4	–	12	.250	15	–	17	.469
Rice	4	–	12	.250	10	–	22	.313
SMU	3	–	13	.188	9	–	21	.300
UCF	0	–	9	.000	0	–	14	.000
† 2009 CUSA Tournament winner As of April 1, 2009; Rankings from AP Poll; *UCF vacated its wins from the 2008–09 season after it was discovered that there was an ineligible player on the team.

2008–09 Horizon League men's basketball standings
	Conf.				Overall
Team	W		L	PCT	W		L	PCT
No. 22 Butler	15	–	3	.833	26	–	6	.813
Green Bay	13	–	5	.722	22	–	11	.667
Cleveland State †	12	–	6	.667	26	–	11	.703
Wright State	12	–	6	.667	20	–	13	.606
Milwaukee	11	–	7	.611	17	–	14	.548
UIC	7	–	11	.389	16	–	15	.516
Youngstown State	7	–	11	.389	11	–	19	.367
Loyola Chicago	6	–	12	.333	14	–	18	.438
Valparaiso	5	–	13	.278	9	–	22	.290
Detroit	2	–	16	.111	7	–	23	.233
† Horizon League Tournament winner As of April 1, 2009; Rankings from AP Poll

2008–09 Ivy League men's basketball standings
	Conf.				Overall
Team	W		L	PCT	W		L	PCT
Cornell	11	–	3	.786	21	–	10	.677
Princeton	8	–	6	.571	13	–	14	.481
Yale	8	–	6	.571	13	–	15	.464
Columbia	7	–	7	.500	12	–	16	.429
Dartmouth	7	–	7	.500	9	–	19	.321
Harvard	6	–	8	.429	14	–	14	.500
Penn	6	–	8	.429	10	–	18	.357
Brown	3	–	11	.214	9	–	19	.321
Rankings from AP Poll

2008–09 MAAC men's basketball standings
	Conf.				Overall
Team	W		L	PCT	W		L	PCT
Siena †	16	–	2	.889	27	–	8	.771
Niagara	14	–	4	.778	26	–	9	.743
Rider	12	–	6	.667	19	–	13	.594
Manhattan	9	–	9	.500	16	–	14	.533
Fairfield	9	–	9	.500	17	–	15	.531
Saint Peter's	8	–	10	.444	11	–	19	.367
Iona	7	–	11	.389	12	–	19	.387
Loyola (MD)	7	–	11	.389	12	–	20	.375
Canisius	4	–	14	.222	11	–	20	.355
Marist	4	–	14	.222	10	–	23	.303
† 2009 MAAC tournament winner Rankings from AP Poll

2008–09 Mid-American Conference men's basketball standings
	Conf.				Overall
Team	W		L	PCT	W		L	PCT
East
Bowling Green	11	–	5	.688	19	–	14	.576
Buffalo	11	–	5	.688	21	–	12	.636
Miami	10	–	6	.625	17	–	13	.567
Akron †	10	–	6	.625	23	–	13	.639
Kent State	10	–	6	.625	19	–	15	.559
Ohio	7	–	9	.438	15	–	17	.469
West
Ball State	7	–	9	.438	14	–	17	.452
Central Michigan	7	–	9	.438	12	–	19	.387
Western Michigan	7	–	9	.438	10	–	21	.323
Eastern Michigan	6	–	10	.375	8	–	24	.250
Northern Illinois	5	–	11	.313	10	–	20	.333
Toledo	5	–	11	.313	7	–	25	.219
† Conference tournament winner Rankings from AP Poll

2008–09 MEAC men's basketball standings
	Conf.				Overall
Team	W		L	PCT	W		L	PCT
Morgan State †	13	–	3	.813	23	–	12	.657
South Carolina State	10	–	6	.625	17	–	14	.548
Bethune–Cookman	9	–	7	.563	17	–	16	.515
North Carolina A&T	9	–	7	.563	16	–	16	.500
Norfolk State	9	–	7	.563	13	–	18	.419
Coppin State	9	–	7	.563	13	–	19	.406
Hampton	8	–	8	.500	16	–	16	.500
Florida A&M	6	–	10	.375	10	–	21	.323
Howard	6	–	10	.375	8	–	23	.258
Delaware State	6	–	10	.375	8	–	24	.250
Maryland Eastern Shore	3	–	13	.188	7	–	23	.233
Winston-Salem State		–		–	8	–	22	.267
† 2009 MEAC tournament winner Rankings from AP Poll

2008–09 Missouri Valley Conference men's basketball standings
	Conf.				Overall
Team	W		L	PCT	W		L	PCT
Northern Iowa †	14	–	4	.778	23	–	11	.676
Creighton	14	–	4	.778	27	–	8	.771
Illinois State	11	–	7	.611	24	–	10	.706
Bradley	10	–	8	.556	21	–	15	.583
Southern Illinois	8	–	10	.444	13	–	18	.419
Evansville	8	–	10	.444	17	–	14	.548
Wichita State	8	–	10	.444	17	–	17	.500
Drake	7	–	11	.389	17	–	16	.515
Indiana State	7	–	11	.389	11	–	21	.344
Missouri State	3	–	15	.167	11	–	20	.355
† Missouri Valley Conference tournament winner As of April 1, 2009; Rankings from AP Poll

2008–09 Mountain West Conference men's basketball standings
	Conf.				Overall
Team	W		L	PCT	W		L	PCT
BYU	12	–	4	.750	25	–	8	.758
No. 25 Utah †	12	–	4	.750	25	–	10	.714
New Mexico	12	–	4	.750	22	–	12	.647
San Diego State	11	–	5	.688	26	–	10	.722
UNLV	9	–	7	.563	21	–	11	.656
Wyoming	7	–	9	.438	19	–	14	.576
TCU	5	–	11	.313	14	–	17	.452
Colorado State	4	–	12	.250	9	–	22	.290
Air Force	0	–	16	.000	10	–	21	.323
† Mountain West tournament winner As of April 1, 2009; Rankings from AP Poll

2008–09 Northeast Conference men's basketball standings
	Conf.				Overall
Team	W		L	PCT	W		L	PCT
Robert Morris †	15	–	3	.833	24	–	11	.686
Mount St. Mary's	12	–	6	.667	19	–	14	.576
Sacred Heart	12	–	6	.667	17	–	14	.548
Long Island	12	–	6	.667	16	–	14	.533
Quinnipiac	10	–	8	.556	15	–	16	.484
Central Connecticut	8	–	10	.444	13	–	17	.433
Wagner	8	–	10	.444	16	–	14	.533
St. Francis (NY)	7	–	11	.389	10	–	20	.333
Monmouth	6	–	12	.333	8	–	23	.258
Fairleigh Dickinson	6	–	12	.333	7	–	23	.233
Saint Francis (PA)	3	–	15	.167	6	–	23	.207
† 2009 NEC tournament winner

2008–09 Ohio Valley Conference men's basketball standings
	Conf.				Overall
Team	W		L	PCT	W		L	PCT
Tennessee–Martin	14	–	4	.778	22	–	10	.688
Murray State	13	–	5	.722	19	–	12	.613
Austin Peay	13	–	5	.722	19	–	14	.576
Morehead State †	12	–	6	.667	20	–	16	.556
Eastern Kentucky	10	–	8	.556	18	–	13	.581
Tennessee State	9	–	9	.500	12	–	18	.400
Eastern Illinois	8	–	10	.444	12	–	18	.400
Tennessee Tech	6	–	12	.333	12	–	18	.400
Jacksonville State	5	–	13	.278	11	–	17	.393
Southeast Missouri State	0	–	18	.000	3	–	27	.100
† Ohio Valley Conference tournament winner As of April 1, 2009; Rankings from AP Poll

2008–09 Pacific-10 Conference men's basketball standings
	Conf.				Overall
Team	W		L	PCT	W		L	PCT
No. 15 Washington	14	–	4	.778	26	–	9	.743
No. 18 UCLA	13	–	5	.722	26	–	9	.743
No. 19 Arizona State	11	–	7	.611	25	–	10	.714
California	11	–	7	.611	22	–	11	.667
USC†	9	–	9	.500	22	–	13	.629
Arizona	9	–	9	.500	21	–	14	.600
Washington State	8	–	10	.444	17	–	16	.515
Oregon State	7	–	11	.389	18	–	18	.500
Stanford	6	–	12	.333	20	–	14	.588
Oregon	2	–	16	.111	8	–	23	.258
† Conference tournament winner Rankings from AP Poll

2008–09 Patriot League men's basketball standings
	Conf.				Overall
Team	W		L	PCT	W		L	PCT
American †	13	–	1	.929	24	–	8	.750
Holy Cross	11	–	3	.786	18	–	14	.563
Navy	8	–	6	.571	19	–	11	.633
Army	6	–	8	.429	11	–	19	.367
Lehigh	5	–	9	.357	15	–	14	.517
Colgate	5	–	9	.357	10	–	20	.333
Bucknell	4	–	10	.286	7	–	23	.233
Lafayette	4	–	10	.286	8	–	22	.267
† 2009 Patriot League tournament winner

2008–09 Southeastern Conference men's basketball standings
	Conf.				Overall
Team	W		L	PCT	W		L	PCT
East
South Carolina	10	–	6	.625	21	–	10	.677
Tennessee	10	–	6	.625	21	–	13	.618
Florida	9	–	7	.563	25	–	11	.694
Vanderbilt	8	–	8	.500	19	–	12	.613
Kentucky	8	–	8	.500	22	–	14	.611
Georgia	3	–	13	.188	12	–	20	.375
West
No. 21 LSU	13	–	3	.813	27	–	8	.771
Auburn	10	–	6	.625	24	–	12	.667
Mississippi State†	9	–	7	.563	23	–	13	.639
Alabama	7	–	9	.438	18	–	14	.563
Ole Miss	7	–	9	.438	16	–	15	.516
Arkansas	2	–	14	.125	14	–	16	.467
† SEC Tournament winner Rankings from AP Poll

2008–09 Southern Conference men's basketball standings
	Conf.				Overall
Team	W		L	PCT	W		L	PCT
North
Western Carolina	11	–	9	.550	16	–	15	.516
Chattanooga †	11	–	9	.550	18	–	17	.514
Samford	9	–	11	.450	16	–	16	.500
Appalachian State	9	–	11	.450	13	–	18	.419
Elon	7	–	13	.350	11	–	20	.355
UNC Greensboro	4	–	16	.200	5	–	25	.167
South
Davidson	18	–	2	.900	27	–	8	.771
The Citadel	15	–	5	.750	20	–	13	.606
Charleston	15	–	5	.750	27	–	9	.750
Wofford	12	–	8	.600	16	–	14	.533
Georgia Southern	5	–	15	.250	8	–	22	.267
Furman	4	–	16	.200	6	–	24	.200
† SoCon Tournament winner As of April 30, 2009; Rankings from AP Poll

2008–09 Southland Conference men's basketball standings
	Conf.				Overall
Team	W		L	PCT	W		L	PCT
East
Stephen F. Austin †	13	–	3	.813	24	–	8	.750
Nicholls State	12	–	4	.750	20	–	11	.645
Southeastern Louisiana	7	–	9	.438	13	–	17	.433
McNeese State	5	–	11	.313	11	–	18	.379
Northwestern State	3	–	13	.188	11	–	20	.355
Central Arkansas	3	–	13	.188	10	–	19	.345
West
Sam Houston State	12	–	4	.750	18	–	12	.600
Texas A&M–Corpus Christi	11	–	5	.688	18	–	15	.545
Texas–Arlington	9	–	7	.563	16	–	14	.533
UTSA	8	–	8	.500	19	–	13	.594
Texas State	7	–	9	.438	14	–	16	.467
Lamar	6	–	10	.375	15	–	15	.500
† 2009 Southland tournament winner

2008–09 SWAC men's basketball standings
	Conf.				Overall
Team	W		L	PCT	W		L	PCT
Alabama State †	16	–	2	.889	22	–	10	.688
Jackson State	15	–	3	.833	18	–	15	.545
Prairie View A&M	12	–	6	.667	17	–	16	.515
Arkansas–Pine Bluff	11	–	7	.611	13	–	18	.419
Southern	8	–	10	.444	8	–	23	.258
Mississippi Valley State	7	–	11	.389	7	–	25	.219
Texas Southern	7	–	11	.389	7	–	25	.219
Alabama A&M	6	–	12	.333	8	–	19	.296
Grambling State	4	–	14	.222	6	–	23	.207
Alcorn State	4	–	14	.222	6	–	25	.194
† 2009 SWAC tournament winner As of March 12, 2009; Rankings from AP Poll

2008–09 Summit League men's basketball standings
	Conf.				Overall
Team	W		L	PCT	W		L	PCT
North Dakota State †	16	–	2	.889	26	–	7	.788
Oral Roberts	14	–	4	.778	16	–	15	.516
Oakland	13	–	5	.722	23	–	13	.639
IUPUI	9	–	9	.500	16	–	14	.533
Southern Utah	8	–	10	.444	11	–	20	.355
IPFW	8	–	10	.444	13	–	17	.433
South Dakota State	7	–	11	.389	13	–	20	.394
Centenary	6	–	12	.333	8	–	23	.258
Western Illinois	6	–	12	.333	9	–	20	.310
UMKC	3	–	15	.167	7	–	24	.226
† Summit League Tournament winner Rankings from AP Poll

2008–09 Sun Belt Conference men's basketball standings
	Conf.				Overall
Team	W		L	PCT	W		L	PCT
East
Western Kentucky †	15	–	3	.833	25	–	9	.735
Troy	14	–	4	.778	19	–	13	.594
Middle Tennessee	10	–	8	.556	18	–	14	.563
South Alabama	10	–	8	.556	20	–	13	.606
Florida International	7	–	11	.389	13	–	20	.394
Florida Atlantic	2	–	16	.111	6	–	26	.188
West
Arkansas-Little Rock	15	–	3	.833	23	–	8	.742
North Texas	11	–	7	.611	20	–	12	.625
Denver	9	–	9	.500	15	–	16	.484
Louisiana–Lafayette	7	–	11	.389	10	–	20	.333
Louisiana–Monroe	6	–	12	.333	10	–	20	.333
New Orleans	6	–	12	.333	11	–	19	.367
Arkansas State	5	–	13	.278	13	–	17	.433
† 2009 Sun Belt Conference tournament winner Rankings from AP Poll

2008–09 WAC men's basketball standings
	Conf.				Overall
Team	W		L	PCT	W		L	PCT
Utah State †	14	–	2	.875	30	–	5	.857
Nevada	11	–	5	.688	21	–	13	.618
Idaho	9	–	7	.563	17	–	16	.515
Boise State	9	–	7	.563	19	–	13	.594
New Mexico State	9	–	7	.563	17	–	15	.531
Louisiana Tech	6	–	10	.375	15	–	18	.455
San Jose State	6	–	10	.375	13	–	17	.433
Hawaii	5	–	11	.313	13	–	17	.433
Fresno State	3	–	13	.188	13	–	21	.382
† Conference tournament winner

2008–09 West Coast Conference men's basketball standings
	Conf.				Overall
Team	W		L	PCT	W		L	PCT
No. 10 Gonzaga†	14	–	0	1.000	28	–	6	.824
Saint Mary's	10	–	4	.714	28	–	7	.800
Portland	9	–	5	.643	19	–	13	.594
Santa Clara	7	–	7	.500	16	–	17	.485
San Diego	6	–	8	.429	16	–	16	.500
Pepperdine	5	–	9	.357	9	–	23	.281
San Francisco	3	–	11	.214	11	–	19	.367
Loyola Marymount	2	–	12	.143	3	–	28	.097
† Conference tournament winner Rankings from AP poll

=== Division I independents ===
Fourteen schools played as Division I independents. However, only Chicago State, Longwood, Savannah State, and Texas–Pan American were considered full NCAA Division I schools, as the rest were still in a transition phase from NCAA Division II. David Holston of Chicago State was named Independent Player of the Year.

2008–09 NCAA Division I men's basketball independents standings
	Conf.				Overall
Team	W		L	PCT	W		L	PCT
Seattle		–		–	21	–	8	.724
South Dakota		–		–	20	–	9	.690
Utah Valley		–		–	17	–	11	.607
Chicago State		–		–	19	–	13	.594
North Dakota		–		–	16	–	12	.571
Longwood		–		–	17	–	14	.548
Savannah State		–		–	15	–	14	.517
Texas–Pan American		–		–	10	–	17	.370
SIU Edwardsville		–		–	10	–	20	.333
Cal State Bakersfield		–		–	8	–	21	.276
Bryant		–		–	8	–	21	.276
Houston Baptist		–		–	5	–	25	.167
North Carolina Central		–		–	4	–	27	.129
NJIT		–		–	1	–	30	.032
Rankings from AP Poll

=== Informal championships ===
Conference	Regular season winner	Most Valuable Player
Philadelphia Big 5	Villanova	Ahmad Nivins, Saint Joseph's

Villanova finished with a 4–0 record in head-to-head competition among the Philadelphia Big 5.

=== Statistical leaders ===
Source for additional stats categories

Points per game			Rebounds per game			Assists per game			Steals per game		
Player	School	PPG	Player	School	RPG	Player	School	APG	Player	School	SPG
Stephen Curry	Davidson	28.6	Blake Griffin	Oklahoma	14.4	Johnathon Jones	Oakland	8.1	Chavis Holmes	VMI	3.4
Lester Hudson	Tenn.-Martin	27.5	John Bryant	Santa Clara	14.2	Brock Young	East Carolina	7.6	Travis Holmes	VMI	3.2
Jermaine Taylor	Central Florida	26.2	Kenneth Faried	Morehead St.	13.0	Levance Fields	Pittsburgh	7.5	Devin Gibson	TX-San Antonio	3.0
David Holston	Chicago St.	25.9	DeJuan Blair	Pittsburgh	12.3	DiJuan Harris	Charlotte	7.2	David Holston	Chicago St.	3.0
Stefon Jackson	UTEP	24.5	Ahmad Nivins	St. Joseph's	11.8	Ashton Mitchell	Sam Houston St.	6.8	Cedric Jackson	Cleveland St.	3.0

Blocked shots per game			Field-goal percentage			Three-Point FG percentage			Free-throw percentage		
Player	School	BPG	Player	School	FG%	Player	School	3FG%	Player	School	FT%
Jarvis Varnado	Miss. St.	4.7	Jeff Pendergraph	Arizona St.	66.0	Mike Rose	Eastern Kentucky	48.1	Brett Harvey	Loyola (MD)	91.0
Hasheem Thabeet	UConn	4.2	Blake Griffin	Oklahoma	65.4	Booker Woodfox	Creighton	47.6	Josh White	North Texas	90.6
Tony Gaffney	UMass	3.8	Joey Henley	Sacred Heart	62.6	Jared Stohl	Portland	45.6	Jodie Meeks	Kentucky	90.2
Kleon Penn	McNeese St.	3.5	Keith Benson	Oakland	62.2	Ryan Tillema	Green Bay	45.4	Darren Collison	UCLA	89.7
Taj Gibson	USC	2.9	Ahmad Nivins	St. Joseph's	61.2	Jimmy Baron	Rhode Island	45.4	Alan Voskuil	Texas Tech	89.6

== Post-season tournaments ==
=== NCAA tournament ===
The NCAA Tournament tipped off on March 18, 2009, with the opening round game in Dayton, Ohio, and concluded on April 6 at the Ford Field in Detroit, Michigan. Of the 65 teams that were invited to participate, 31 were automatic bids while 34 were at-large bids. The 34 at-large teams came from 8 conferences, with the Big East, ACC and Big Ten each receiving seven bids. The Big 12 and Pac-10 each received six bids. The SEC and Atlantic 10 each received three bids. This season also marked the first time that three teams from the same conference were selected as #1 seeds (Louisville, Pittsburgh and Connecticut). North Carolina tore through the tournament, winning each game by 12 or more points and beating Michigan State in the Final 89–72 behind an NCAA-record 55 first-half points to win its fifth National championship. Ty Lawson recorded a record 8 steals, while Wayne Ellington was named tournament Most Outstanding Player.

==== Final Four – Ford Field, Detroit, Michigan ====
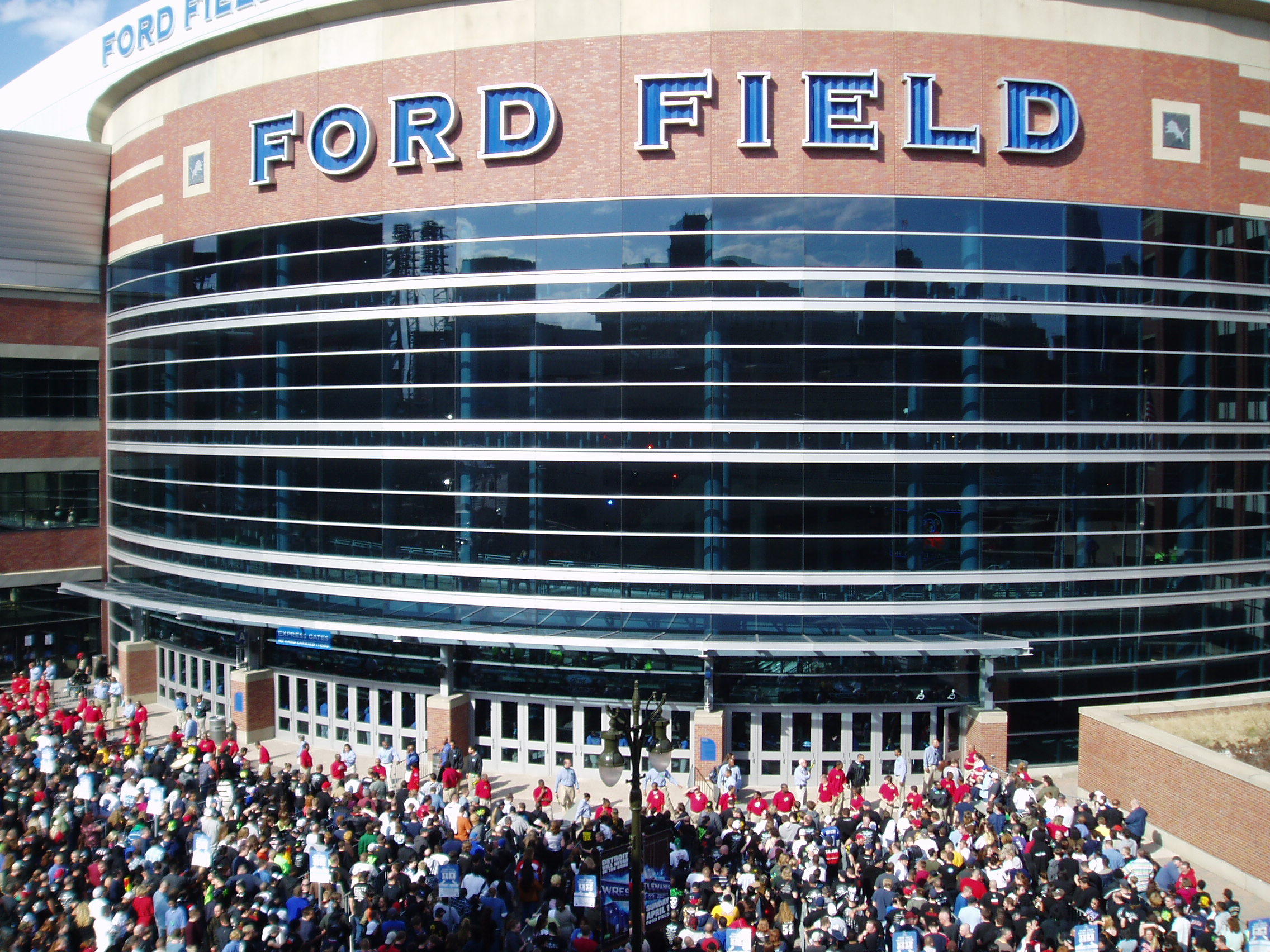
Ford Field in Detroit, Michigan, was the site of the season ending Final Four and Championship game for 2008-09.

National semifinals April 4; 6:07 p.m.; 40 min. after first game
M2	Michigan State	82
W1	Connecticut	73
S1	North Carolina	83
E3	Villanova	69

National championship game April 6; 9:21 p.m.
2	Michigan State	72
1	North Carolina	89

=== National Invitation tournament ===
After the NCAA Tournament field was announced, the National Invitation Tournament invited 32 teams to participate. Five teams were automatic qualifiers for winning their conference regular-season championships, while the remaining 27 bids were named from an at-large pool. Notable entrants included Kentucky, who broke a 17-year NCAA tournament appearance streak by missing the field, as well as preseason top ten team Notre Dame and 2008 Regional Finalist Davidson. Penn State defeated Baylor 69–63 in the Final on April 2. The Nittany Lions' Jamelle Cornley was named tournament Most Outstanding Player.

==== NIT Semifinals and Final ====
Played at Madison Square Garden in New York City on March 31 and April 2

Semifinals
1	San Diego State	62
3	Baylor	76
2	Notre Dame	59
2	Penn State	67

Final
3	Baylor	63
2	Penn State	69

=== College Basketball Invitational ===
The second College Basketball Invitational (CBI) Tournament was held beginning March 17 and ended with a best-of-three final, ending March 30. Oregon State defeated UTEP 2–1 in the final series to win the title. Oregon State's Roeland Schaftenaar was named tournament MVP.

Semifinals (Reseeded)
1	Richmond	69
4	UTEP	81
2	Oregon State	65^{OT}
3	Stanford	62

Finals (Best of three)
4	UTEP	69	70	73
2	Oregon State	75	63	81

=== CollegeInsider.com tournament ===
The inaugural CollegeInsider.com Postseason Tournament was held beginning March 17 and ended with a championship game on March 30. This tournament places an emphasis on selecting successful teams from "mid-major" conferences who were left out of the NCAA Tournament and NIT. Old Dominion defeated Bradley 66–62 to win the first CIT championship in Peoria, Illinois. The Monarchs' Frank Hassell was named tournament MVP.

Semi-Finals
James Madison	43
Old Dominion	81
Pacific	49
Bradley	59

Finals
Old Dominion	66
Bradley	62

== Award winners ==
=== Consensus All-American teams ===
Consensus First Team
Player	Position	Class	Team
DeJuan Blair	C	Sophomore	Pittsburgh
Stephen Curry	PG	Junior	Davidson
Blake Griffin	PF	Sophomore	Oklahoma
Tyler Hansbrough	C	Senior	North Carolina
James Harden	SG	Sophomore	Arizona State

Consensus Second Team
Player	Position	Class	Team
Sherron Collins	PG	Junior	Kansas
Luke Harangody	PF	Junior	Notre Dame
Ty Lawson	PG	Junior	North Carolina
Jodie Meeks	SG	Junior	Kentucky
Jeff Teague	PG	Sophomore	Wake Forest
Hasheem Thabeet	C	Junior	Connecticut

=== Major player of the year awards ===
- Wooden Award: Blake Griffin, Oklahoma
- Naismith Award: Blake Griffin, Oklahoma
- Associated Press Player of the Year: Blake Griffin, Oklahoma
- NABC Player of the Year: Blake Griffin, Oklahoma
- Oscar Robertson Trophy (USBWA): Blake Griffin, Oklahoma
- Adolph Rupp Trophy: Blake Griffin, Oklahoma
- CBS/Chevrolet Player of the Year: Blake Griffin, Oklahoma
- Sporting News Player of the Year: Blake Griffin, Oklahoma

=== Major freshman of the year awards ===
- USBWA Freshman of the Year: Tyreke Evans, Memphis
- Sporting News Freshman of the Year: Tyreke Evans, Memphis

=== Major coach of the year awards ===
- Associated Press Coach of the Year: Bill Self, Kansas
- Henry Iba Award (USBWA): Bill Self, Kansas
- NABC Coach of the Year: Mike Anderson, Missouri & John Calipari, Memphis
- Naismith College Coach of the Year: Jamie Dixon, Pittsburgh
- CBS/Chevrolet Coach of the Year: Bill Self, Kansas
- Adolph Rupp Cup: Rick Pitino, Louisville
- Sporting News Coach of the Year: Bill Self, Kansas

=== Other major awards ===
- Bob Cousy Award (Best point guard): Ty Lawson, North Carolina
- Pete Newell Big Man Award (Best big man): Blake Griffin, Oklahoma
- NABC Defensive Player of the Year: Hasheem Thabeet, Connecticut
- Frances Pomeroy Naismith Award (Best player 6'0"/1.83 m or shorter): Darren Collison, UCLA
- Lowe's Senior CLASS Award (top senior): Tyler Hansbrough, North Carolina
- Robert V. Geasey Trophy (Top player in Philadelphia Big 5): Ahmad Nivins, St. Joseph's
- NIT/Haggerty Award (Top player in New York City metro area): Charles Jenkins, Hofstra
- Chip Hilton Player of the Year Award (Strong personal character): Jon Brockman, Washington

== Coaching changes ==
A number of teams changed coaches throughout the season and after the season ended.

Team	Former Coach	Interim Coach	New Coach	Reason
Alabama	Mark Gottfried	Philip Pearson	Anthony Grant	Gottfried resigned mid-season and was replaced by VCU's Grant after the season
Appalachian State	Houston Fancher		Buzz Peterson	Fancher resigned, the Mountaineers re-hired former head coach Peterson.
Arizona	Lute Olson	Russ Pennell	Sean Miller	Olson retired after learning from his doctor that he had a stroke.
Army	Jim Crews		Zach Spiker	Crews was fired only weeks before the start of practice
Boston University	Dennis Wolff		Pat Chambers	Wolff was fired after 15 seasons at BU.
Cal Poly	Kevin Bromley		Joe Callero	Bromley was fired following a 3-win season.
Elon	Ernie Nestor		Matt Matheny	Nestor resigned, Davidson assistant Matt Matheny was hired as head coach after the season
Fairleigh Dickinson	Tom Green		Greg Vetrone	Green was fired after 26 years at the helm.
Florida International	Sergio Rouco		Isiah Thomas	Rouco was fired after five losing seasons in his five years at FIU.
Georgia	Dennis Felton	Pete Herrman	Mark Fox	Felton is fired after seven straight losses
Georgia Southern	Jeff Price		Charlton Young	Price resigned after an 8-win season
Grambling	Rick Duckett		Bobby Washington	Duckett left under uncertain circumstances following the death of Grambling player Henry White
Hampton	Kevin Nickelberry		Edward Joyner	Nickelberry resigned after three seasons.
High Point	Bart Lundy		Scott Cherry	Lundy was fired after a 21-loss season and last-place Big South finish
Holy Cross	Ralph Willard		Sean Kearney	Willard returns to Rick Pitino's Louisville staff as an assistant
Kentucky	Billy Gillispie		John Calipari	Gillispie was fired after two years and missing the NCAA tournament
Liberty	Ritchie McKay		Dale Layer	McKay left Liberty after the transfer of Seth Curry to become Associate head coach for new Virginia coach Tony Bennett.
Loyola Marymount	Bill Bayno		Max Good	Bayno resigned for medical reasons.
Memphis	John Calipari		Josh Pastner	Calipari left to take the Kentucky job.
Nevada	Mark Fox		David Carter	Fox left to take the Georgia job. Nevada elevated assistant Carter to replace him.
NC Central	Henry Dickerson		LeVelle Moton	
North Florida	Matt Kilcullen		Matthew Driscoll	
Portland State	Ken Bone		Tyler Geving	Portland State promoted assistant Geving after Bone left for Washington State
Seattle	Joe Callero		Cameron Dollar	Callero left for the Cal Poly job.
Southern California	Tim Floyd		Kevin O'Neill	Floyd resigned following allegations that player O. J. Mayo was paid during his time at USC.
Southeast Missouri State	Scott Edgar	Zac Roman	Dickey Nutt	Edgar was fired while on administrative leave over possible major NCAA violations.
Tennessee-Martin	Bret Campbell		Jason James	Campbell resigned after an audit turned up check-cashing irregularities. UTM then hired James, who became the second-youngest coach in Division I.
Tennessee State	Cy Alexander	Mark Pittman	John Cooper	Alexander was fired after starting 6–16, TSU hired Auburn associate head coach Cooper.
Texas-Pan American	Tom Schuberth		Ryan Marks	
Virginia	Dave Leitao		Tony Bennett	Leitao resigned just two years removed from an ACC regular-season title.
Virginia Commonwealth	Anthony Grant		Shaka Smart	Popular Grant left for Alabama. VCU hired Florida assistant Smart as his replacement.
Xavier	Sean Miller		Chris Mack	Miller left Xavier to fill the vacancy at Arizona. He had reportedly turned down the job only to change his mind less than 24 hours later.
Washington State	Tony Bennett		Ken Bone	Bennett left for the Virginia job.
