= 2008–09 Gonzaga Bulldogs men's basketball team =

American college basketball season

2008–09 Gonzaga Bulldogs men's basketball

WCC tournament champions WCC regular season champions

NCAA tournament, Sweet Sixteen
- Conference: West Coast Conference

Ranking
- Coaches: No. 13
- AP: No. 10
- Record: 28–6 (14–0 WCC)
- Head coach: Mark Few (10th season)
- Assistant coaches: Leon Rice (10th season); Tommy Lloyd (8th season); Ray Giacoletti (2nd season)
- Home arena: McCarthey Athletic Center

2008–09 West Coast Conference men's basketball standings
	Conf.				Overall
Team	W		L	PCT	W		L	PCT
No. 10 Gonzaga†	14	–	0	1.000	28	–	6	.824
Saint Mary's	10	–	4	.714	28	–	7	.800
Portland	9	–	5	.643	19	–	13	.594
Santa Clara	7	–	7	.500	16	–	17	.485
San Diego	6	–	8	.429	16	–	16	.500
Pepperdine	5	–	9	.357	9	–	23	.281
San Francisco	3	–	11	.214	11	–	19	.367
Loyola Marymount	2	–	12	.143	3	–	28	.097
† Conference tournament winner Rankings from AP poll

The 2008–09 Gonzaga Bulldogs men's basketball team represented Gonzaga University in the 2008-09 NCAA Division I men's basketball season. The Bulldogs were members of the West Coast Conference, were led by head coach Mark Few, and played their home games at the McCarthey Athletic Center on the Gonzaga campus in Spokane, Washington. The Zags finished the season 28–6, 14–0 in WCC play to claim the regular-season championship. They advanced to the championship game of the 2009 West Coast Conference men's basketball tournament, where they won the championship game against Saint Mary's.

They received an invitation to the 2009 NCAA Division I men's basketball tournament, earning 4 seed in the South Region. They defeated 13 seed Akron and 12 seed Western Kentucky before losing to the 1 seed and eventual champions North Carolina in the sweet sixteen.

== Preseason ==
=== Departures ===
Name	Number	Pos.	Height	Weight	Year	Hometown	Reason for departure
Abdullahi Kuso	31	F	6'9"	241	Senior (redshirt)	Kaduna, Nigeria	Graduated
David Pendergraft	25	G	6'6"	223	Senior	Brewster, WA	Graduated
Larry Gurganious	20	F	6'5"	199	Sophomore (redshirt)	Berkeley, CA	Transferred to UC Riverside
Theo Davis	34	F	6'9"	198	Freshman (redshirt)	Brampton, ON	Transferred to Binghamton

=== 2008 recruiting class ===
College recruiting
Name	Hometown	School	Height	Weight	Commit date
Andy Poling; PF	Portland, OR	Westview	6 ft 11 in (2.11 m)	232 lb (105 kg)	Aug 2, 2006
Andy Poling; PF	Recruit ratings: Scout: Rivals: (87)				
Grant Gibbs; PG	Marion, IA	Linn-Mar	6 ft 4 in (1.93 m)	204 lb (93 kg)	Jul 17, 2007
Grant Gibbs; PG	Recruit ratings: Scout: Rivals: (89)				
Demetri Goodson; PG	McKinney, TX	Klein Collins	5 ft 11 in (1.80 m)	164 lb (74 kg)	Oct 2, 2007
Demetri Goodson; PG	Recruit ratings: Scout: Rivals: (93)				
Michael Hart; SG	Portland, OR	Jesuit	6 ft 5 in (1.96 m)	201 lb (91 kg)	
Michael Hart; SG	Recruit ratings: Scout: Rivals: (NR)				
Overall recruit ranking: Scout: NR Rivals: NR 247Sports: NR ESPN: NR
Note: In many cases, Scout, Rivals, 247Sports, On3, and ESPN may conflict in their listings of height and weight.; In these cases, the average was taken. ESPN grades are on a 100-point scale.; Sources: "2008 Gonzaga Rivals Commits". Rivals.; "2008 Gonzaga Scout Commits". Scout.; "2008 Gonzaga ESPN Commits". ESPN.; "Scout.com Team Recruiting Rankings". Scout.; "2008 Team Ranking". Rivals.; "2008–09 Gonzaga Bulldogs men's basketball team". 247Sports.

== Roster ==
2008–09 Gonzaga Bulldogs men's basketball team
Players
Coaches

Pos.	#	Name	Height	Weight	Year	Previous school	Hometown
F	42	Josh Heytvelt	6 ft 11 in (2.11 m)	260 lb (118 kg)	RS Sr	Clarkston	Clarkston, WA
G	11	Andrew Sorenson	6 ft 2 in (1.88 m)	172 lb (78 kg)	RS Sr	Olympia	Olympia, WA
G	22	Micah Downs	6 ft 8 in (2.03 m)	194 lb (88 kg)	Sr	Juanita; Kansas	Kirkland, WA
G	2	Jeremy Pargo	6 ft 2 in (1.88 m)	220 lb (100 kg)	Sr	Robeson	Chicago, IL
F	50	Ira Brown	6 ft 4 in (1.93 m)	235 lb (107 kg)	Sr	Willis; Phoenix College	Conroe, TX
C	45	Will Foster	7 ft 5 in (2.26 m)	273 lb (124 kg)	Jr	White River	Bonney Lake, WA
G	15	Matt Bouldin	6 ft 5 in (1.96 m)	224 lb (102 kg)	Jr	ThunderRidge	Highlands Ranch, CO
G	4	Chris Pontarolo-Magg (W)	5 ft 11 in (1.8 m)	175 lb (79 kg)	Jr	Quincy	Quincy, WA
G	32	Steven Gray	6 ft 5 in (1.96 m)	208 lb (94 kg)	So	Bainbridge	Bainbridge Island, WA
F	5	Austin Daye	6 ft 11 in (2.11 m)	200 lb (91 kg)	So	Woodbridge	Irvine, CA
C	21	Robert Sacre (injured) (redshirt)	7 ft 0 in (2.13 m)	247 lb (112 kg)	So	Handsworth	North Vancouver, BC
G	3	Demetri Goodson	5 ft 11 in (1.8 m)	164 lb (74 kg)	Fr	Klein Collins	Spring, TX
F	14	Andy Poling (redshirt)	6 ft 11 in (2.11 m)	232 lb (105 kg)	Fr	Westview	Portland, OR
G	10	Grant Gibbs (redshirt)	6 ft 4 in (1.93 m)	204 lb (93 kg)	Fr	Linn-Mar	Marion, IA
G	30	Michael Hart (W) (redshirt)	6 ft 5 in (1.96 m)	201 lb (91 kg)	Fr	Jesuit	Portland, OR

Head coach

- Mark Few (Oregon)

Assistant coach(es)

- Leon Rice (Washington State)
- Tommy Lloyd (Whitman)
- Ray Giacoletti (Minot State)

Legend

- (C) Team captain
- (S) Suspended
- (I) Ineligible
- (W) Walk-on
- Injured
- Current redshirt

Roster

== Schedule ==
Date time, TV	Rank^{#}	Opponent^{#}	Result	Record	Site (attendance) city, state
Regular season
11/15/2008*; 4:00 pm, KHQ-TV	No. 10	Montana State Billings	W 83–52	1–0	McCarthey Athletic Center (6,000); Spokane, WA
11/18/2008*; 6:00 pm, KHQ-TV	No. 9	Idaho	W 80–46	2–0	McCarthey Athletic Center (6,000); Spokane, WA
11/27/2008*; 6:30 pm, ESPN2	No. 9	vs. Oklahoma State; Old Spice Classic	W 83–71	3–0	Disney's Wide World of Sports Complex (4,644); Lake Buena Vista, FL
11/28/2008*; 2:30 pm, ESPN	No. 9	vs. Maryland; Old Spice Classic	W 81–59	4–0	Disney's Wide World of Sports Complex; Lake Buena Vista, FL
11/30/2008*; 4:30 pm, ESPN2	No. 9	vs. No. 12 Tennessee; Old Spice Classic	W 73–64	5–0	Disney's Wide World of Sports Complex (3,914); Lake Buena Vista, FL
12/06/2008*; 10:30 am, Big Ten Network	No. 5	at Indiana; Basketball Hall of Fame Challenge	W 70–54	6–0	Lucas Oil Stadium; Indianapolis, IN
12/10/2008*; 7:00 pm, KHQ-TV	No. 4	at Washington State	W 74–52	7–0	Beasley Coliseum (10,984); Pullman, WA
12/14/2008*; 3:00 pm, FSN	No. 4	vs. Arizona; Duel in the Desert	L 64–69	7–1	US Airways Center (6,207); Phoenix, AZ
12/18/2008*; 6:00 pm, KHQ-TV	No. 8	Texas Southern	W 84–42	8–1	McCarthey Athletic Center (6,000); Spokane, WA
12/20/2008*; 1:00 pm, CBS	No. 8	vs. No. 2 Connecticut; Battle in Seattle	L 83–88 ^{OT}	8–2	KeyArena (16,763); Seattle, WA
12/23/2008*; 5:00 pm, KHQ-TV	No. 7	Portland State	L 70–77	8–3	McCarthey Athletic Center (6,000); Spokane, WA
12/31/2008*; 5:00 pm, CBS College Sports	No. 16	at Utah	L 65–66	8–4	Jon M. Huntsman Center (12,571); Salt Lake City, UT
1/7/2009*; 6:00 pm, ESPN2		at No. 15 Tennessee	W 89–79 ^{OT}	9–4	Thompson-Boling Arena (22,326); Knoxville, TN
1/10/2009; 5:00 pm, KHQ-TV		Portland	W 67–50	10–4 (1–0)	McCarthey Athletic Center (6,000); Spokane, WA
1/15/2009; 6:00 pm, KHQ-TV		Santa Clara	W 95–53	11–4 (2–0)	McCarthey Athletic Center (6,000); Spokane, WA
1/17/2009; 5:00 pm, KHQ-TV		San Francisco	W 85–51	12–4 (3–0)	McCarthey Athletic Center (6,000); Spokane, WA
1/22/2009; 6:00 pm, KHQ-TV	No. 23	at Pepperdine	W 83–69	13–4 (4–0)	Firestone Fieldhouse (2,342); Malibu, CA
1/24/2009; 5:00 pm, KHQ-TV	No. 23	at Loyola Marymount	W 93–60	14–4 (5–0)	Gersten Pavilion (3,796); Los Angeles, CA
1/29/2009; 8:00 pm, ESPN2	No. 20	No. 22 Saint Mary's	W 69–62	15–4 (6–0)	McCarthey Athletic Center (6,000); Spokane, WA
1/31/2009; 3:00 pm, ESPN	No. 20	San Diego	W 64–47	16–4 (7–0)	McCarthey Athletic Center (6,000); Spokane, WA
2/5/2009; 8:00 pm, ESPN2	No. 18	at Portland	W 93–78	17–4 (8–0)	Chiles Center (4,987); Portland, OR
2/7/2009*; 6:00 pm, ESPN	No. 18	vs. No. 14 Memphis; ESPN College GameDay & Ronald McDonald House Charities Classic	L 50–68	17–5	Spokane Arena (11,339); Spokane, WA
2/12/2009; 8:00 pm, ESPN2	No. 19	at Saint Mary's	W 72–70	18–5 (9–0)	McKeon Pavilion (3,500); Moraga, CA
2/14/2009; 8:00 pm, ESPNU	No. 19	at San Francisco	W 78–73	19–5 (10–0)	War Memorial Gymnasium (3,367); San Francisco, CA
2/19/2009; 6:00 pm, KHQ-TV	No. 17	Loyola Marymount	W 91–54	20–5 (11–0)	McCarthey Athletic Center (6,000); Spokane, WA
2/21/2009; 8:30 pm, ESPNU	No. 17	Pepperdine	W 92–58	21–5 (12–0)	McCarthey Athletic Center (6,000); Spokane, WA
2/26/2009; 8:00 pm, ESPN2	No. 17	at Santa Clara	W 81–73	22–5 (13–0)	Leavey Center (4,700); Santa Clara, CA
2/28/2009; 4:30 pm, ESPN2	No. 17	at San Diego	W 58–47	23–5 (14–0)	Jenny Craig Pavilion (5,100); San Diego, CA
3/3/2009*; 6:00 pm, KHQ-TV	No. 14	USC Upstate	W 90–40	24–5	McCarthey Athletic Center (6,000); Spokane, WA
WCC Tournament
03/8/2009; 6:30 pm, ESPN2	No. 14	vs. Santa Clara	W 94–59	25–5	Orleans Arena (7,845); Las Vegas, NV
03/9/2009; 6:00 pm, ESPN	No. 12	vs. Saint Mary's	W 83–58	26–5	Orleans Arena (7,845); Las Vegas, NV
NCAA tournament
3/19/09*; 4:25 pm, CBS	No. 10 (4)	vs. (13) Akron; First Round	W 77–64	27–5	Rose Garden; Portland, Oregon
3/21/09*; 5:30 pm, CBS	No. 10 (4)	vs. (12) Western Kentucky; Second Round	W 83–81	28–5	Rose Garden (18,794); Portland, Oregon
3/27/09*; 6:57 pm, CBS	No. 10 (4)	vs. No. 2 (1) North Carolina; Sweet Sixteen	L 77–98	28–6	FedExForum (17,103); Memphis, Tennessee
*Non-conference game. ^{#}Rankings from AP Poll. (#) Tournament seedings in parentheses. All times are in Pacific Time.
