= QHS =

QHS, qhs, or q.h.s. may refer to:

== Medicine ==
- q.h.s., qhs or qHS, Latin for "every night at bedtime", an abbreviation used in medical prescriptions
- A post-nominal used by the Queen's Honorary Surgeon, a member of the Medical Household, U.K.

== Other ==
- Qedemawi Haile Selassie (1892–1975), Emperor of Ethiopia
- Queens Historical Society, the historical society of Queens, New York City, United States
- Queensferry High School, a secondary school in Scotland
- Quincy High School (disambiguation), any of several high schools in the United States
- Quincy Historical Society, the historical society of Quincy, Massachusetts, United States
