= 2008–09 William & Mary Tribe men's basketball team =

American college basketball season

2008–09 William & Mary Tribe men's basketball
- Conference: Colonial Athletic Association
- Record: 10–20 (5–13 CAA)
- Head coach: Tony Shaver (6th season)
- Assistant coaches: Ben Wilkins; Jamion Christian; Jonathan Holmes; Kevin Snyder (director of basketball operations)
- Home arena: Kaplan Arena

2008–09 CAA men's basketball standings
	Conf.				Overall
Team	W		L	PCT	W		L	PCT
VCU †	14	–	4	.778	24	–	10	.706
George Mason	13	–	5	.722	22	–	11	.667
Old Dominion	12	–	6	.667	25	–	10	.714
Northeastern	12	–	6	.667	19	–	13	.594
Hofstra	11	–	7	.611	21	–	11	.656
Drexel	10	–	8	.556	15	–	14	.517
James Madison	9	–	9	.500	21	–	15	.583
Georgia State	8	–	10	.444	12	–	20	.375
Delaware	6	–	12	.333	13	–	19	.406
William & Mary	5	–	13	.278	10	–	20	.333
Towson	5	–	13	.278	12	–	22	.353
UNC Wilmington	3	–	15	.167	7	–	25	.219
† 2009 CAA tournament winner Rankings from AP poll

The 2008–09 William & Mary Tribe men's basketball team represented The College of William & Mary during the 2008–09 college basketball season. This was head coach Tony Shaver's sixth season at William & Mary. The Tribe competed in the Colonial Athletic Association and played their home games at Kaplan Arena. They finished the season 10–20, 5–13 in CAA play and lost in the preliminary round of the 2009 CAA men's basketball tournament to James Madison. They did not participate in any post-season tournaments.
