= Quincy High School =

Quincy High School may refer to one of several schools in the United States:

- Quincy High School (Massachusetts) in Quincy, Massachusetts
  - North Quincy High School in Quincy, Massachusetts
- Quincy High School (Michigan) in Quincy, Michigan
- Quincy High School (Washington) in Quincy, Washington
- Quincy Junior-Senior High School in Quincy, California
- Quincy Notre Dame High School in Quincy, Illinois
- Quincy Senior High School in Quincy, Illinois
