= 2009 West Coast Conference men's basketball tournament =

- Classification: Division I
- Season: 2008–09
- Teams: 8
- Site: Orleans Arena; Paradise, Nevada
- Champions: Gonzaga (10th title)
- Winning coach: Mark Few (8th title)
- MVP: Micah Downs (Gonzaga)
- Television: ESPN2, ESPN

2008–09 West Coast Conference men's basketball standings
	Conf.				Overall
Team	W		L	PCT	W		L	PCT
No. 10 Gonzaga†	14	–	0	1.000	28	–	6	.824
Saint Mary's	10	–	4	.714	28	–	7	.800
Portland	9	–	5	.643	19	–	13	.594
Santa Clara	7	–	7	.500	16	–	17	.485
San Diego	6	–	8	.429	16	–	16	.500
Pepperdine	5	–	9	.357	9	–	23	.281
San Francisco	3	–	11	.214	11	–	19	.367
Loyola Marymount	2	–	12	.143	3	–	28	.097
† Conference tournament winner Rankings from AP poll

The 2009 West Coast Conference men's basketball tournament took place March 6–9, 2009, at Orleans Arena in Paradise, Nevada, just outside Las Vegas. This was the first WCC tournament to have been held at a neutral site; it previously rotated between various campus sites. The semifinals were televised by ESPN2, and the championship game was televised by ESPN.

Gonzaga capped off a perfect season in conference play by winning the tournament. The Bulldogs' trip to the 2009 NCAA tournament was their 11th in a row.

== 2009 West Coast Conference tournament ==
First round Friday, March 6
5	San Diego	62
8	Loyola Marymount	58
6	Pepperdine	93
7	San Francisco	85

Quarter finals Saturday, March 7
4	Santa Clara	80
5	San Diego	69
3	Portland	69
6	Pepperdine	45

Semi-finals; Sunday, March 8
1	#14 Gonzaga	94
4	Santa Clara	59
2	Saint Mary's	71
3	Portland	61

Finals; Monday, March 9
1	#12 Gonzaga	83
2	Saint Mary's	58

Asterisk denotes game ended in overtime.
