= 2008–09 Drexel Dragons men's basketball team =

American college basketball season

2008–09 Drexel Dragons men's basketball
- Conference: Colonial Athletic Association
- Record: 15–14 (10–8 CAA)
- Head coach: Bruiser Flint (8th season)
- Assistant coach: Mike Connors (1st season)
- Home arena: Daskalakis Athletic Center

2008–09 CAA men's basketball standings
	Conf.				Overall
Team	W		L	PCT	W		L	PCT
VCU †	14	–	4	.778	24	–	10	.706
George Mason	13	–	5	.722	22	–	11	.667
Old Dominion	12	–	6	.667	25	–	10	.714
Northeastern	12	–	6	.667	19	–	13	.594
Hofstra	11	–	7	.611	21	–	11	.656
Drexel	10	–	8	.556	15	–	14	.517
James Madison	9	–	9	.500	21	–	15	.583
Georgia State	8	–	10	.444	12	–	20	.375
Delaware	6	–	12	.333	13	–	19	.406
William & Mary	5	–	13	.278	10	–	20	.333
Towson	5	–	13	.278	12	–	22	.353
UNC Wilmington	3	–	15	.167	7	–	25	.219
† 2009 CAA tournament winner Rankings from AP poll

The 2008–09 Drexel Dragons men's basketball team represented Drexel University during the 2008–09 NCAA Division I men's basketball season. The Dragons, led by 8th year head coach Bruiser Flint, played their home games at the Daskalakis Athletic Center and were members of the Colonial Athletic Association. They lost in the first round of the CAA tournament to Towson.

== Roster ==
2008–09 Drexel Dragons men's basketball team
Players
Coaches

Pos.	#	Name	Height	Weight	Year	Previous school	Hometown
G	0	Tramayne Hawthorne	6 ft 0 in (1.83 m)	180 lb (82 kg)	Sr	Steelton-Highspire)	Steelton, PA
G	1	Bobby Jordan	6 ft 0 in (1.83 m)	180 lb (82 kg)	Sr	Roman Catholic	Philadelphia, PA
G	3	Scott Rodgers	6 ft 3 in (1.91 m)	200 lb (91 kg)	Sr	Central	Philadelphia, PA
F	5	Leon Spencer	6 ft 8 in (2.03 m)	220 lb (100 kg)	Jr	Brunswick Community College	Charlotte, N.C.
G	11	Gerald Colds	5 ft 11 in (1.8 m)	160 lb (73 kg)	So	St. Raymond's	New York, NY
F	13	Yannick Formbor	6 ft 8 in (2.03 m)	255 lb (116 kg)	RS So	St. Patrick's	Roselle, NJ
G	14	Bill Lally	6 ft 0 in (1.83 m)	170 lb (77 kg)	Jr	Roman Catholic	Philadelphia, PA
G	15	Chris Fouch (injured) (redshirt)	6 ft 0 in (1.83 m)	165 lb (75 kg)	Fr	Rice	Bronx, NY
F	21	Kevin Phillip (W)	6 ft 6 in (1.98 m)	220 lb (100 kg)	Fr	Bishop Loughlin	Brooklyn, NY
G	23	Jamie Harris	5 ft 10 in (1.78 m)	165 lb (75 kg)	So	Wings Academy	New York, NY
G	30	Chris Mohl	6 ft 3 in (1.91 m)	180 lb (82 kg)	Sr	Bishop McDevitt	Philadelphia, PA
F	33	Evan Neisler	6 ft 8 in (2.03 m)	215 lb (98 kg)	RS Jr	Boston College	Raleigh, NC
F	42	Kenny Tribbett	6 ft 9 in (2.06 m)	250 lb (113 kg)	RS Jr	Chester (Pa.)	Berlin, NJ
F	44	Stuart Cameron	6 ft 8 in (2.03 m)	235 lb (107 kg)	Jr	Wilmington Charter	Wilmington, DE
F	45	Samme Givens	6 ft 5 in (1.96 m)	215 lb (98 kg)	Fr	Academy of the New Church	Philadelphia, PA

Head coach

- James "Bruiser" Flint (Saint Joseph's)

Assistant coach(es)

- Mike Connors (Ithaca)

Legend

- (C) Team captain
- (S) Suspended
- (I) Ineligible
- (W) Walk-on
- Injured
- Current redshirt

Roster
Last update: August 18, 2014

== Schedule ==
Date time, TV	Rank^{#}	Opponent^{#}	Result	Record	Site (attendance) city, state
Regular season
November 18, 2008*; 10:00 am, ESPN		Penn; Battle of 33rd Street, ESPN Hoops Marathon	W 66-64	1-0	Daskalakis Athletic Center (2,434); Philadelphia, PA
November 22, 2008*; 1:00 pm		at No. 22 Georgetown	L 53-81	1-1	Verizon Center (11,434); Washington, D.C.
December 1, 2008*; 7:00 pm		Cal State Northridge	W 55-47	2-1	Daskalakis Athletic Center (1,143); Philadelphia, PA
December 6, 2008; 4:30 pm, CN8		George Mason	L 55-56	2-2 (0-1)	Daskalakis Athletic Center (1,406); Philadelphia, PA
December 14, 2008*; 3:30 pm		at Fairfield	L 60-66	2-3	Webster Bank Arena (2,106); Fairfield, CT
December 18, 2008*; 7:00 pm, DUTV		Niagara	L 62-67	2-4	Daskalakis Athletic Center (1,436); Philadelphia, PA
December 20, 2008*; 5:00 pm		at Bucknell	L 75-81	2-5	Sojka Pavilion (2,148); Lewisburg, PA
December 22, 2008*; 1:00 pm		at No. 23 Memphis	L 49-87	2-6	FedExForum (16,715); Memphis, TN
December 27, 2008*; 3:00 pm, CN8		at Rider	W 76-70	3-6	Alumni Gymnasium (1,650); Lawrenceville, NJ
December 31, 2008*; 5:00 pm, CN8		vs. Saint Joseph's	W 64-52	4-6	Palestra (5,631); Philadelphia, PA
January 3, 2009; 2:00 pm, MSG TV		at Hofstra	W 63-56	5-6 (1-1)	Hofstra Arena (3,020); Hempstead, NY
January 5, 2009; 7:00 pm, CSN		at James Madison	L 60-66	5-7 (1-2)	JMU Convocation Center (2,648); Harrisonburg, VA
January 8, 2009; 7:00 pm, ESPNU		VCU	L 46-75	5-8 (1-3)	Daskalakis Athletic Center (2,149); Philadelphia, PA
January 10, 2009; 4:00 pm		at Georgia State	W 53-50	6-8 (2-3)	GSU Sports Arena (1,133); Atlanta, GA
January 14, 2009; 7:00 pm		Hofstra	W 70-52	7-8 (3-3)	Daskalakis Athletic Center (1,932); Philadelphia, PA
January 17, 2009; 7:00 pm		at UNC Wilmington	W 76-52	8-8 (4-3)	Trask Coliseum (4,320); Wilmington, NC
January 20, 2009; 7:00 pm, CSN		Delaware	W 79-69	9-8 (5-3)	Daskalakis Athletic Center (1,741); Philadelphia, PA
January 24, 2009; 4:00 pm		William and Mary	W 62-49	10-8 (6-3)	Daskalakis Athletic Center (2,432); Philadelphia, PA
January 28, 2009; 7:00 pm		Georgia State	W 64-47	11-8 (7-3)	Daskalakis Athletic Center (1,493); Philadelphia, PA
January 31, 2009; 4:00 pm, CSN		at Towson	W 60-53	12-8 (8-3)	Towson Center (2,954); Towson, MD
February 4, 2009; 8:00 pm, CNP		at Delaware	L 70-73 ^{OT}	12-9 (8-4)	Bob Carpenter Center (2,735); Newark, DE
February 7, 2009; 7:00 pm, CNP		Old Dominion	L 53-63	12-10 (8-5)	Daskalakis Athletic Center (2,294); Philadelphia, PA
February 11, 2009; 7:00 pm		at Northeastern	W 62-58	13-10 (9-5)	Matthews Arena (2,088); Boston, MA
February 15, 2009; 3:00 pm, CNP		Towson	W 78-65	14-10 (10-5)	Daskalakis Athletic Center (2,215); Philadelphia, PA
February 18, 2009; 7:00 pm		at George Mason	L 48-49	14-11 (10-6)	Patriot Center (5,579); Fairfax, VA
February 21, 2009*; 5:00 pm		Loyola (MD)	W 74-58	15-11	Daskalakis Athletic Center (2,132); Philadelphia, PA
February 25, 2009; 7:00 pm		Northeastern	L 46-47	15-12 (10-7)	Daskalakis Athletic Center (2,339); Philadelphia, PA
February 28, 2009; 7:00 pm		at William and Mary	L 47-48	15-13 (10-8)	Kaplan Arena (2,472); Williamsburg, VA
CAA tournament
March 6, 2009; 8:30 pm	(6)	vs. (11) Towson; CAA tournament first round	L 62-73	15-14	Richmond Coliseum (8,321); Richmond, VA
*Non-conference game. ^{#}Rankings from AP. (#) Tournament seedings in parentheses. All times are in Eastern Time.

== Awards ==
Bruiser Flint

- CAA Coach Of The Year

Samme Givens

- CAA All-Rookie Team
- CAA Rookie of the Week

Tramayne Hawthorne

- CAA Player of the Week

Scott Rodgers

- CAA All-Conference Second Team
- CAA All-Defensive Team
- CAA Player of the Week

Leon Spencer

- CAA Player of the Week
- CAA All-Academic Second Team
