= 2008–09 VCU Rams men's basketball team =

American college basketball season

2008–09 VCU Rams men's basketball

CAA regular season and tournament champions

NCAA Tournament South Region 11 Seed, first round
- Conference: Colonial Athletic Association
- Record: 24–10 (14–4 CAA)
- Head coach: Anthony Grant (3rd year)
- Assistant coaches: Tony Pujol; John Brannen; Allen Edwards
- Home arena: Stuart C. Siegel Center

2008–09 CAA men's basketball standings
	Conf.				Overall
Team	W		L	PCT	W		L	PCT
VCU †	14	–	4	.778	24	–	10	.706
George Mason	13	–	5	.722	22	–	11	.667
Old Dominion	12	–	6	.667	25	–	10	.714
Northeastern	12	–	6	.667	19	–	13	.594
Hofstra	11	–	7	.611	21	–	11	.656
Drexel	10	–	8	.556	15	–	14	.517
James Madison	9	–	9	.500	21	–	15	.583
Georgia State	8	–	10	.444	12	–	20	.375
Delaware	6	–	12	.333	13	–	19	.406
William & Mary	5	–	13	.278	10	–	20	.333
Towson	5	–	13	.278	12	–	22	.353
UNC Wilmington	3	–	15	.167	7	–	25	.219
† 2009 CAA tournament winner Rankings from AP poll

The 2008–09 VCU Rams men's basketball team represented Virginia Commonwealth University during the 2008–09 college basketball season. The Rams compete in the Colonial Athletic Association and played their home games at Stuart C. Siegel Center. They finished the season 24–10, 14–4 and won the 2009 CAA tournament against George Mason.

The Rams lost in the first round of the 2009 NCAA tournament to UCLA by one point.

== Schedule ==
Date time, TV	Rank^{#}	Opponent^{#}	Result	Record	Site city, state
Exhibition
11/07/2008*; 7:30pm		Virginia Union	W 91–63		Stuart C. Siegel Center; Richmond, VA
11/12/2008*; 7:30pm		Virginia State	W 79–64		Stuart C. Siegel Center; Richmond, VA
Regular season
11/16/2008*; 4:00pm		The Citadel	W 82–59	1–0	Stuart C. Siegel Center; Richmond, VA
11/19/2008*; 7:30pm		South Dakota State	W 72–56	2–0	Stuart C. Siegel Center; Richmond, VA
11/22/2008*; 7:00pm		at Rhode Island	L 86-92	2–1	Ryan Center; Kingston, RI
11/25/2008*; 7:00pm		at East Carolina	L 90–93 ^{OT}	2–2	Williams Arena; Greenville, NC
11/29/2008*; 11:00pm		vs. New Mexico; Cancún Challenge	W 67-55	3–2	Moon Palace; Cancún, MX
11/30/2008*; 10:30pm		vs. Vanderbilt; Cancún Challenge	L 66–71	3–3	Moon Palace; Cancún, MX
12/04/2008*; 7:30pm		Western Michigan	W 79-62	4–3	Stuart C. Siegel Center; Richmond, VA
12/06/2008; 7:00pm		at William & Mary	W 66-50	5-3 (1-0)	Kaplan Arena; Williamsburg, VA
12/13/2008*; 2:00pm, ESPNU		at Richmond; Farm Bureau Insurance Black & Blue Classic	W 77-76	6-3	Robins Center; Richmond, VA
12/17/2008*; 7:30pm		Akron	W 73-69	7-3	Stuart C. Siegel Center; Richmond, VA
12/20/2008*; 10:00pm, ESPN2		at No. 4 Oklahoma; All-College Basketball Classic	L 70-81	7-4	Ford Center; Oklahoma City, OK
12/27/2008*; 7:30pm		Hampton	W 59-54	8-4	Stuart C. Siegel Center; Richmond, VA
1/03/2009; 4:30pm		at Delaware	L 79-81	8-5 (1-1)	Bob Carpenter Center; Newark, DE
1/05/2009; 9:00pm		UNC Wilmington	W 88-59	9-5 (2-1)	Stuart C. Siegel Center; Richmond, VA
1/08/2009; 7:00pm		at Drexel	W 75-46	10-5 (3-1)	Daskalakis Athletic Center; Philadelphia, PA
1/10/2009; 12:00pm		Hofstra	W 68-60	11-5 (4-1)	Stuart C. Siegel Center; Richmond, VA
1/14/2009; 7:00pm		at Towson	W 78-71	12-5 (5-1)	Towson Center; Towson, MD
1/17/2009; 4:00pm		Old Dominion	W 61-44	13-5 (6-1)	Stuart C. Siegel Center; Richmond, VA
1/21/2009; 7:00pm		at Georgia State	W 65-50	14-5 (7-1)	GSU Sports Arena; Atlanta, GA
1/24/2009; 4:00pm		George Mason	W 76-71	15-5 (8-1)	Stuart C. Siegel Center; Richmond, VA
1/27/2009; 9:00pm		Northeastern	L 63-68	15-6 (8-2)	Stuart C. Siegel Center; Richmond, VA
1/31/2009; 12:00pm		at Hofstra	W 66-62	16-6 (9-2)	Hofstra Arena; Hempstead, NY
2/04/2009; 7:00pm		at UNC Wilmington	L 72-81	16-7 (9-3)	Trask Coliseum; Wilmington, NC
2/07/2009; 7:30pm		William & Mary	W 76-54	17-7 (10-3)	Stuart C. Siegel Center; Richmond, VA
2/11/2009; 7:30pm		James Madison	W 76-71	18-7 (11-3)	Stuart C. Siegel Center; Richmond, VA
2/14/2009; 2:00pm		at Old Dominion	L 65-69	18-8 (11-4)	Ted Constant Convocation Center; Norfolk, VA
2/18/2009; 7:00pm		Delaware	W 78-67	19-8 (12-4)	Stuart C. Siegel Center; Richmond, VA
2/20/2009; 9:00pm, ESPNU		at Nevada; ESPNU BracketBusters	L 70-71	19-9	Lawlor Events Center; Reno, NV
2/25/2009; 7:00pm		at James Madison	W 71-52	20-9 (13-4)	JMU Convocation Center; Harrisonburg, VA
2/28/2009; 4:00pm		Georgia State	W 69-41	21-9 (14-4)	Stuart C. Siegel Center; Richmond, VA
CAA tournament
Mar. 7; 12:00pm		vs. Georgia State; Quarterfinals	W 61–52	22–9	Richmond Coliseum; Richmond, VA
Mar. 8; 3:00pm, CSN		vs. Old Dominion; Semifinals	W 61–53	23–9	Richmond Coliseum; Richmond, VA
Mar. 9; 7:00pm, ESPN		vs. George Mason; Championship	W 71–50	24-9	Richmond Coliseum; Richmond, VA
NCAA tournament
Mar. 19; 9:50pm, CBS	No. (E 11)	vs. No. 18 (E 6) UCLA; First Round	L 64–65	24–10	Wachovia Center; Philadelphia, PA
*Non-conference game. ^{#}Rankings from AP Poll. (#) Tournament seedings in parentheses.
