= 2009 CAA men's basketball tournament =

- Classification: Division I
- Season: 2008–09
- Teams: 12
- Site: Richmond Coliseum; Richmond, VA
- Champions: VCU (4th title)
- Winning coach: Anthony Grant (2nd title)
- MVP: Eric Maynor (VCU)
- Television: ESPN

2008–09 CAA men's basketball standings
	Conf.				Overall
Team	W		L	PCT	W		L	PCT
VCU †	14	–	4	.778	24	–	10	.706
George Mason	13	–	5	.722	22	–	11	.667
Old Dominion	12	–	6	.667	25	–	10	.714
Northeastern	12	–	6	.667	19	–	13	.594
Hofstra	11	–	7	.611	21	–	11	.656
Drexel	10	–	8	.556	15	–	14	.517
James Madison	9	–	9	.500	21	–	15	.583
Georgia State	8	–	10	.444	12	–	20	.375
Delaware	6	–	12	.333	13	–	19	.406
William & Mary	5	–	13	.278	10	–	20	.333
Towson	5	–	13	.278	12	–	22	.353
UNC Wilmington	3	–	15	.167	7	–	25	.219
† 2009 CAA tournament winner Rankings from AP poll

The 2009 CAA men's basketball tournament was held from March 6–9, 2009. It was won by the VCU Rams.

== Bracket ==
First round
8	Georgia State	54
9	Delaware	41
5	Hofstra	79
12	UNC Wilmington	66
7	James Madison	70
10	William & Mary	48
6	Drexel	62
11	Towson	73

Quarterfinals
8	Georgia State	52
1	VCU	61
4	Old Dominion	52
5	Hofstra	51
7	James Madison	53
2	George Mason	61
3	Northeastern	54
11	Towson	58

Semifinals
1	VCU	61
4	Old Dominion	53
2	George Mason	56
11	Towson	48

Final
1	VCU	71
2	George Mason	50

== Honors ==
CAA All-Tournament Team	Player	School	Position	Year
CAA All-Tournament Team	Junior Hairston	Towson	Forward	Senior
CAA All-Tournament Team	Gerald Lee	Old Dominion	Forward	Junior
CAA All-Tournament Team	Cam Long	George Mason	Guard	Sophomore
CAA All-Tournament Team	Eric Maynor	Virginia Commonwealth	Guard	Senior
CAA All-Tournament Team	Larry Sanders	Virginia Commonwealth	Forward	Sophomore
CAA All-Tournament Team	Dre Smith	George Mason	Guard	Senior

== Notable games in the tournament ==
=== First round ===
- #5 Hofstra defeated #12 UNC-Wilmington, 79–66. The game was played on March 6; the last time these two teams met in the Coliseum, UNCW won the CAA Championship over Hofstra, 78–67, on March 6, 2006. The final scores were only 2 points off.

=== Quarterfinals ===
- #11 Towson defeated #3 Northeastern, 58–54, in one of the greatest upsets in CAA tournament history. Never had a #11 seed even won a game in the tournament, and now Towson had won two straight.

=== Semifinals ===
- #1 VCU defeated #4 Old Dominion 61–53 in the rubber match between the two in-state rivals.

=== Championship game ===
- VCU won its 3rd championship in 6 seasons, all of them coming against George Mason. VCU's victory marked the largest score gap in the championship's history. Thousands of people stormed the Richmond Coliseum court after the final buzzer.
