= CollegeInsider.com Postseason Tournament =

Fourth-tier postseason collegiate men's basketball tournament

- Current season, competition or edition: 2024 CollegeInsider.com Postseason Tournament
- CollegeInsider.com Postseason Tournament
- Sport: Basketball
- Founded: 2009
- Founder: CollegeInsider.com
- First season: 2009
- Folded: 2024
- No. of teams: varied between 9 and 32
- Country: United States
- Last champion: Norfolk State
- Most titles: No team has won more than one title
- Broadcasters: Fox College Sports (2009–2012); CBS Sports Network (2013–2019)
- Related competitions: National Invitation Tournament; College Basketball Crown; College Basketball Invitational; Vegas 16
- Website: www.collegeinsider.com/tournament

The CollegeInsider.com Postseason Tournament (CIT) was an American men's college basketball postseason tournament founded by CollegeInsider.com. The tournament was oriented toward teams that did not get selected for the NCAA Division I men's basketball tournament or National Invitation Tournament (NIT) that reside outside of the "major conferences". CollegeInsider.com originally defined majors as the Power Five conferences (Atlantic Coast Conference, Big Ten Conference, Big XII Conference, Pac-12 Conference, Southeastern Conference), American Athletic Conference, Atlantic 10 Conference, Big East Conference, Conference USA and Mountain West Conference.

The tournament was first contested in 2009. In 2012, it expanded to 32 participating teams, but contracted to 26 teams for the 2016, 2017, and 2019 editions, and 20 teams in 2018. The tournament was canceled in 2020 and 2021 due to the COVID-19 pandemic. In 2022, the tournament was re-launched and rebranded as The Basketball Classic. While neither The Basketball Classic nor the CIT were contested in 2023, CollegeInsider.com announced in early March that the CIT will be revived in a 16-team pod-based format for the 2023–24 postseason. Ultimately, only nine teams agreed to play in the 2024 edition.

In February 2025, CollegeInsider.com announced a 2025 edition of the CIT would be contested between March 18 and 25. However, no participating teams were ever announced, and the schedule that had previously appeared on the website was rendered blank. Expectedly, the tournament was not revived in 2026, and the official website remained defunct.

== Format ==
The tournament initially consisted of five rounds, single elimination-style, and leveraged the "use the old NIT model in which matchups in future rounds are determined by the results of the previous round". The revived CIT, starting in 2024, features an altered format. The plan was for four schools to each host a four-team pod with two semifinals and a final the next day. The winners were to advance to the CIT national semifinals to be played on campus sites, and the championship game played at the site of the highest remaining seed. The entire field was to be seeded 1 through 16. The format had to be revised, since only nine teams committed to play. A substantially similar format as the original planned for 2024 was announced in February 2025, for the 2025 edition of the tournament. However, no 2025 tournament was played.

Criteria for selection include, but are not limited to, win–loss record, strength of schedule, strength of conference, and final ten games. Teams from major conferences, i.e. conferences not included in the CollegeInsider.com mid-major poll, are generally ineligible. In the early years of the tournament, participating teams had to finish the regular season with a minimum .500 winning percentage to be considered. An exception to this rule was provided for the champion of the now-defunct Great West Conference tournament, who was given an automatic bid to play in the CIT, if they did not receive an at-large bid to participate in the NCAA or NIT tournaments. In 2013, Chicago State won the last Great West Conference tournament and became the first team to participate in the CIT with a losing record (11–21). The Great West Conference dissolved in 2013.

From 2016 to 2019, the Coach John McLendon Classic was played on the first day of the CIT. The classic was to feature at least one historically black college/university. The winner of the John McLendon Classic advanced to the second round of the CIT. This was the first time in NCAA Division I basketball history that a "classic" had been part of a postseason tournament. Previously the John McLendon Classic had been played during the regular season. Starting with the 2024 edition, multiple classics were contested during the tournament, and the team winning each classic earned a trophy. Only nine teams agreed to participate in 2024 CIT. In the cancelled 2025 tournament, the finals of each of the four pods were planned to be designated as classics.

As of 2017, teams were required to pay $30,000 to host a game.

== Broadcast ==
In 2013, CBS Sports Network partnered with the CIT, showing only the championship game, with the earlier rounds streamed live online. Free registration was required to view the games. Starting in 2014, CBSSN aired the semifinals along with the championship game. In 2017, the early rounds of the tournament were shown on Facebook Live. In 2018, Monday's four classics were broadcast by CBSSN. All remaining games until the semifinals were moved to CBS' Sports Live streaming service and watchcit.com. In 2024, games were broadcast or streamed in accordance with the television contracts of the host teams. Since Norfolk State hosted the 2024 final, it was streamed on Spartan Showcase.

The following summarizes the television networks and announcers that have broadcast the CIT:

Year	Network	Play-by-Play	Analyst	Sideline
2009	Fox College Sports	Dave Baker	Kyle Macy	
2010	Fox College Sports	Dave Baker	Kyle Macy	
2011	Fox College Sports	Dave Baker	Kyle Macy	
2012	Fox College Sports	Dave Baker	Kyle Macy	Dave Calloway
2013	CBSSN	Dave Baker	Kyle Macy	
2014	CBSSN	Dave Popkin	Dave Calloway	
2015	CBSSN	Dave Popkin	Kyle Macy	Kevaney Martin
2016	CBSSN	Dave Popkin	Kyle Macy	Kevaney Martin
2017	CBSSN	Dave Popkin	Kyle Macy	Kevaney Martin
2018	CBSSN	Dave Popkin	Kyle Macy	Kevaney Martin
2019	WatchCIT	Jake Griffith	Bob Bolen	
2020–2023	Not held			
2024	Spartan Showcase			
2025–2026	Not held			

== Champions ==
CIT champions
– 1 championship

Year	Champion	Runner-up	Most Valuable Player
2009	Old Dominion	Bradley	Frank Hassell
2010	Missouri State	Pacific	Will Creekmore
2011	Santa Clara	Iona	Kevin Foster
2012	Mercer	Utah State	Langston Hall
2013	East Carolina	Weber State	Maurice Kemp
2014	Murray State	Yale	Cameron Payne
2015	Evansville	Northern Arizona	D. J. Balentine
2016	Columbia	UC Irvine	Maodo Lo
2017	Saint Peter's	Texas A&M–Corpus Christi	Quadir Welton
2018	Northern Colorado	UIC	Andre Spight
2019	Marshall	Green Bay	C. J. Burks
2020–2023	Not held		
2024	Norfolk State	Purdue Fort Wayne	Christian Ings
2025–2026	Not held		
