= 2009 CollegeInsider.com Postseason Tournament =

- Teams: 16
- Finals site: Carver Arena; Peoria, Illinois
- Champions: Old Dominion (1st title)
- Runner-up: Bradley (1st title game)
- Semifinalists: James Madison (1st semifinal); Pacific (1st semifinal)
- Winning coach: Blaine Taylor (1st title)
- MVP: Frank Hassell (Old Dominion)

The 2009 CollegeInsider.com Postseason Tournament (CIT) was a single-elimination tournament of 16 National Collegiate Athletic Association (NCAA) Division I teams. Old Dominion defeated Bradley 66–62 in the tournament final.

The 16 selected teams were from a pool not invited to the 2009 NCAA Men's Division I Basketball Tournament or the 2009 National Invitation Tournament.

The tournament began with first round games on March 17, 2009 and concluded with the championship game on March 31.

== Bracket ==
Bracket is for visual purposes only. The CIT does not have a set bracket.

First round March 17, 18, 19
Mount St. Mary's	58
James Madison	69
Rider	64
Liberty	79
Belmont	92
Evansville	76
The Citadel	59
Old Dominion	67
Drake	67
Idaho	69
Portland	76
Pacific	82
Kent State	74
Oakland	80
Austin Peay	74
Bradley	81

Quarterfinals; March 23
James Madison	88
Liberty	65
Belmont	62
Old Dominion	70
Idaho	59
Pacific	69
Oakland	75
Bradley	76

Semifinals; March 25, 26
James Madison	43
Old Dominion	81
Pacific	49
Bradley	59

Championship; March 31
Old Dominion	66
Bradley	62

Home teams listed second.
