= 2008–09 Old Dominion Monarchs basketball team =

American college basketball season

2008–09 Old Dominion Monarchs basketball

CollegeInsider.com tournament champions
- Conference: Colonial Athletic Association
- Record: 25–10 (12–6 CAA)
- Head coach: Blaine Taylor (8th season)
- Assistant coaches: Jim Corrigan (15th season); Rob Wilkes (7th season); John Richardson (4th season); Joel Hines (1st season)
- Home arena: Ted Constant Convocation Center

2008–09 CAA men's basketball standings
	Conf.				Overall
Team	W		L	PCT	W		L	PCT
VCU †	14	–	4	.778	24	–	10	.706
George Mason	13	–	5	.722	22	–	11	.667
Old Dominion	12	–	6	.667	25	–	10	.714
Northeastern	12	–	6	.667	19	–	13	.594
Hofstra	11	–	7	.611	21	–	11	.656
Drexel	10	–	8	.556	15	–	14	.517
James Madison	9	–	9	.500	21	–	15	.583
Georgia State	8	–	10	.444	12	–	20	.375
Delaware	6	–	12	.333	13	–	19	.406
William & Mary	5	–	13	.278	10	–	20	.333
Towson	5	–	13	.278	12	–	22	.353
UNC Wilmington	3	–	15	.167	7	–	25	.219
† 2009 CAA tournament winner Rankings from AP poll

The 2008–09 Old Dominion Monarchs basketball team represented Old Dominion University in National Collegiate Athletic Association (NCAA) Division I men's basketball during the 2008–09 season. Playing in the Colonial Athletic Association (CAA) and led by eighth-year head coach Blaine Taylor, the Monarchs finished the season with a 25–10 overall record and won the 2009 CollegeInsider.com Postseason Tournament – the first year of the tournament's existence.

In CAA play, the Monarchs finished in third place with a 12–6 record. They advanced to the semi-finals of the 2009 CAA tournament, where they lost to eventual champion VCU, 61–53.

== Roster ==
2008–09 Old Dominion Monarchs men's basketball team
Players
Coaches

Pos.	#	Name	Height	Weight	Year	Previous school	Hometown
C	1	Nick Wright	6 ft 8 in (2.03 m)	215 lb (98 kg)	Fr	Nansemond River HS	Suffolk, Virginia
G/F	2/35	Ben Finney	6 ft 5 in (1.96 m)	220 lb (100 kg)	So	I. C. Norcom HS / Hargrave Military Academy	Portsmouth, Virginia
G	3	Darius James	6 ft 1 in (1.85 m)	170 lb (77 kg)	So	Tallwood HS	Virginia Beach, Virginia
G	10	Etoile Imama	6 ft 3 in (1.91 m)	195 lb (88 kg)	RS Fr	Champlain College Saint-Lambert	Montreal, Canada
F	12	Gerald Lee	6 ft 10 in (2.08 m)	250 lb (113 kg)	Jr	Korihait	Uusikaupunki, Finland
G	15	Trian Iliadis	6 ft 4 in (1.93 m)	185 lb (84 kg)	Fr	Gwelup School	Perth, Western Australia
F	20	Chris Cooper	6 ft 9 in (2.06 m)	230 lb (104 kg)	Fr	Forest Park HS	Woodbridge, Virginia
F	21	Frank Hassell	6 ft 8 in (2.03 m)	245 lb (111 kg)	RS So	Indiana River HS	Chesapeake, Virginia
G	22	Marquel DeLancey	6 ft 0 in (1.83 m)	180 lb (82 kg)	Fr	Mount Vernon HS	Alexandria, Virginia
G	23	Marsharee Neely	6 ft 2 in (1.88 m)	190 lb (86 kg)	Jr	Walter Hines Page HS	Greensboro, North Carolina
G/F	24	Kent Bazemore	6 ft 5 in (1.96 m)	195 lb (88 kg)	RS Fr	Bertie HS	Kelford, North Carolina
F	33	Keyon Carter	6 ft 8 in (2.03 m)	220 lb (100 kg)	RS So	William T. Dwyer HS	Riviera Beach, Florida
F	34	Jonathan Adams	6 ft 6 in (1.98 m)	215 lb (98 kg)	Sr	Baylor School (TN)	Ringgold, Georgia

Head coach

- Blaine Taylor (Montana '81)

Assistant coach(es)

- Jim Corrigan (Duke '80)
- Rob Wilkes (Stetson '93)
- John Richardson (Elizabeth City State '95)
- Joel Hines (Old Dominion '05)

Legend

- (C) Team captain
- (S) Suspended
- (I) Ineligible
- (W) Walk-on
- Injured
- Current redshirt

Roster
Last update: 9–7–2019

== Schedule and results ==
Date time, TV	Rank^{#}	Opponent^{#}	Result	Record	Site (attendance) city, state
Exhibition
Nov 4, 2008*; 7:00 p.m.		Chowan	W 69–51		Ted Constant Center (2,422); Norfolk, VA
Nov 8, 2008*; 7:00 p.m.		Virginia State	W 85–59		Ted Constant Center (3,702); Norfolk, VA
Non-conference regular season
Nov 16, 2008*; 8:00 p.m.		at Charlotte	W 69–38	1–0	Dale F. Halton Arena (5,849); Charlotte, NC
Nov 22, 2008*; 4:00 p.m., CSN+		UAB	L 62–77	1–1	Ted Constant Center (7,870); Norfolk, VA
Nov 25, 2008*; 7:00 p.m.		at Bucknell	L 82–83 ^{2OT}	1–2	Sojka Pavilion (2,249); Lewisburg, PA
Nov 29, 2008*; 11:30 a.m.		Marshall	L 64–68	1–3	Cam Henderson Center (5,130); Huntington, WV
12/3/2008*; 7:pm, CSN+		Richmond	W 65–62	2–3	Ted Constant Center (6,242); Norfolk, VA
12/6/2008; 4:00pm		Delaware	W 56–49	3–3 (1–0)	Ted Constant Center (6,122); Norfolk, VA
12/14/2008*; 4:00pm		NC Central	W 79–54	4–3	Ted Constant Center (5,655); Norfolk, VA
12/17/2008*; 7:00pm		at Duquesne	W 86–60	5–3	A.J. Palumbo Center (1,843); Pittsburgh, Pennsylvania
12/20/2008*; 7:00pm		Winthrop	W 66–54	6–3	Ted Constant Center (6,104); Norfolk, VA
12/22/2008*; 7:00pm		Maryland Eastern Shore	W 66–56	7–3	Ted Constant Center (5,448); Norfolk, VA
12/30/2008*; 7:00pm		Winston-Salem State	W 80–50	8–3	Ted Constant Center (5,952); Norfolk, VA
CAA regular season
1/3/2009; 4:00pm		at Georgia State	L 54–55	8–4 (1–1)	GSU Sports Arena (1,102); Atlanta, GA
1/5/2009; 7:00pm		at William & Mary; Rivalry	W 62–50	9–4 (2–1)	Kaplan Arena (2,077); Williamsburg, Virginia
1/7/2009; 7:00pm, WSKY		James Madison; Rivalry	L 62–70	9–5 (2–2)	Ted Constant Center (6,552); Norfolk, VA
1/10/2009; 2:00pm, Comcast		at George Mason	L 53–61	9–6 (2–3)	Patriot Center (6,626); Fairfax, Virginia
1/13/2009; 9:00pm, ESPNU		Georgia State	W 73–56	10–6 (3–3)	Ted Constant Center (6,432); Norfolk, VA
1/17/2009; 4:00pm, Comcast		at VCU; Rivalry	L 44–61	10–7 (3–4)	Stuart C. Siegel Center (7,567); Richmond, Virginia
1/21/2009; 7:00pm, WSKY		at UNC Wilmington	W 87–57	11–7 (4–4)	Ted Constant Center (6,552); Norfolk, VA
1/24/2009; 7:00pm, Comcast		Northeastern	L 42–58	11–8 (4–5)	Ted Constant Center (7,572); Norfolk, VA
1/28/2009; 7:00pm, WSKY		at James Madison; Rivalry	W 80–74	12–8 (5–5)	JMU Convocation Center (3,955); Harrisonburg, VA
1/31/2009; 4:00pm, Comcast		George Mason	W 73–71	13–8 (6–5)	Ted Constant Center (8,424); Norfolk, VA
2/3/2009; 7:00pm, WSKY		Towson	W 71–62	14–8 (7–5)	Ted Constant Center (6,332); Norfolk, VA
2/7/2009; 7:00pm, WSKY		Drexel	W 63–53	15–8 (8–5)	Daskalakis Athletic Center (2,294); Philadelphia, Pennsylvania
2/10/2009; 7:00pm		at Hofstra	L 51–60	15–9 (8–6)	Mack Sports Complex (2,241); Hempstead, New York
2/14/2009; 2:00pm, Comcast		VCU; Rivalry	W 69–65	16–9 (9–6)	Ted Constant Center (8,424); Norfolk, VA
2/18/2009; 7:00pm, WSKY		at UNC Wilmington	W 84–65	17–9 (10–6)	Trask Coliseum (3,620); Wilmington, North Carolina
2/21/2009*; 11:00am, ESPNU		Liberty; ESPN BracketBusters	W 80–56	18–9	Ted Constant Center (6,862); Norfolk, VA
2/25/2009; 7:00pm, WSKY		William & Mary; Rivalry	W 64–63	19–9 (11–6)	Ted Constant Center (7,142); Norfolk, VA
2/28/2009; 6:00pm, Comcast		at Northeastern	W 57–54 ^{OT}	20–9 (12–6)	Matthews Arena (2,157); Boston, Massachusetts
CAA tournament
Mar 7, 2009; 2:30 p.m., CSN-NE		vs. Hofstra; Quarterfinals	W 52–51	21–9	Richmond Coliseum (7,287); Richmond, VA
Mar 8, 2009; 3:00 p.m., CSN-NE		vs. VCU; Semifinals	L 53–61	21–10	Richmond Coliseum (7,925); Richmond, VA
CollegeInsider.com Postseason Tournament
Mar 19, 2009*; 7:00 p.m.		The Citadel; First round	W 67–59	22–10	Ted Constant Center (2,157); Norfolk, VA
Mar 23, 2009*; 7:00 p.m.		vs. Belmont; Quarterfinals	W 70–62	23–10	Ted Constant Center (2,137); Norfolk, VA
Mar 26, 2009; 7:00 p.m.		James Madison; Semifinals	W 81–43	24–10	Ted Constant Center (2,932); Norfolk, VA
Mar 31, 2009*; 8:00 p.m., FCS		at Bradley; Championship	W 66–62	25–10	Carver Arena (8,118); Peoria, IL
*Non-conference game. ^{#}Rankings from AP Poll. (#) Tournament seedings in parentheses. All times are in Eastern Time.
