= 2008–09 George Mason Patriots men's basketball team =

American college basketball season

2008–09 George Mason Patriots men's basketball

NIT 1st Round, vs. Penn State, L, 77–73 OT
- Conference: Colonial Athletic Association
- Record: 22–11 (13–5 CAA)
- Head coach: Jim Larranaga
- Assistant coaches: Eric Konkol; Chris Caputo; Michael Huger
- Home arena: Patriot Center

2008–09 CAA men's basketball standings
	Conf.				Overall
Team	W		L	PCT	W		L	PCT
VCU †	14	–	4	.778	24	–	10	.706
George Mason	13	–	5	.722	22	–	11	.667
Old Dominion	12	–	6	.667	25	–	10	.714
Northeastern	12	–	6	.667	19	–	13	.594
Hofstra	11	–	7	.611	21	–	11	.656
Drexel	10	–	8	.556	15	–	14	.517
James Madison	9	–	9	.500	21	–	15	.583
Georgia State	8	–	10	.444	12	–	20	.375
Delaware	6	–	12	.333	13	–	19	.406
William & Mary	5	–	13	.278	10	–	20	.333
Towson	5	–	13	.278	12	–	22	.353
UNC Wilmington	3	–	15	.167	7	–	25	.219
† 2009 CAA tournament winner Rankings from AP poll

The 2008–09 George Mason Patriots men's basketball team began its 43rd season of collegiate play on November 15, 2008, versus the University of Vermont. The players were looking to continue the success from their 2007–2008 season where they won the 2008 Colonial Athletic Association tournament championship game and advanced to the 2008 NCAA men's basketball tournament. The 2008–09 Patriots had a 13–5 regular season record and were runners-up in the 2009 Colonial Athletic Association tournament. The team reached the 2009 National Invitation Tournament, but they lost in overtime to eventual tournament champion Penn State.

== Season notes ==
- On February 2, 2009, it was announced that George Mason would play the Creighton Bluejays on February 21 as part of the annual ESPN Bracket Busters event.
- On January 21, 2009, during a game versus Northeastern University, senior guard John Vaughan suffered a concussion and was carted off the court. He was taken to a local hospital and released later that night. He missed at least 1 week of action.
- On December 27, 2008, it was announced that sophomore forward Vlad Moldoveanu will be released from his basketball commitment. He enrolled at American University.
- On December 22, 2008, the George Mason men's basketball team won their 600th game in the history of the program.

== Awards ==
Second Team All-CAA

- Darryl Monroe
- John Vaughan

Third Team All-CAA

- Cam Long

CAA All-Rookie Team

- Ryan Pearson

CAA All-Defensive Team

- John Vaughan

CAA Player of the Week

- Darryl Monroe – Jan. 12

CAA Rookie of the Week

- Ryan Pearson – Nov. 17
- Ryan Pearson – Dec. 1

== Roster ==
2008–09 George Mason Patriots men's basketball team
Players
Coaches

Pos.	#	Name	Height	Weight	Year	Previous school	Hometown
F	33	Louis Birdsong	6 ft 6 in (1.98 m)	230 lb (104 kg)	Jr	Mount Saint Joseph’s	Baltimore, MD
G	2	Andre Cornelius	5 ft 10 in (1.78 m)	172 lb (78 kg)	Fr	Victory Christian	Charlotte, NC
F	40	Chris Fleming	6 ft 7 in (2.01 m)	250 lb (113 kg)	Sr	Osbourn Park	Manassas, VA
F	3	Kevin Foster	6 ft 7 in (2.01 m)	211 lb (96 kg)	Fr	Kathleen	Lakeland, FL
G	5	Brian Henderson	6 ft 3 in (1.91 m)	195 lb (88 kg)	Fr	Magruder	Gaithersburg, Maryland
G	20	Cam Long	6 ft 4 in (1.93 m)	187 lb (85 kg)	So	Freedom	Palm Bay, FL
F	32	Darryl Monroe	6 ft 7 in (2.01 m)	275 lb (125 kg)	RS Sr	First Colonial	Virginia Beach, VA
F	22	Mike Morrison	6 ft 9 in (2.06 m)	222 lb (101 kg)	Fr	Lakewood	St. Petersburg, FL
G	10	Jimmy Nolan	6 ft 0 in (1.83 m)	170 lb (77 kg)	Fr	Archbishop McCarthy	Plantation, FL
F	24	Ryan Pearson	6 ft 6 in (1.98 m)	230 lb (104 kg)	Fr	Christ the King	Far Rockaway, NY
G	1	Dre Smith	6 ft 0 in (1.83 m)	185 lb (84 kg)	Sr	Lamar	Houston, TX
G	13	Isaiah Tate	6 ft 4 in (1.93 m)	214 lb (97 kg)	So	DeMatha	Upper Marlboro, MD
F	23	John Vaughn	6 ft 3 in (1.91 m)	179 lb (81 kg)	RS Sr	Laurel	Laurel, MD

Head coach

- Jim Larranaga (Providence)

Assistant coach(es)

- Eric Konkol (Wisconsin-Eau Claire)
- Michael Huger (Bowling Green)
- Chris Caputo (Westfield)

Legend

- (C) Team captain
- (S) Suspended
- (I) Ineligible
- (W) Walk-on
- Injured
- Current redshirt

Roster
Last update: 2010-07-27

== Stats ==
Player	GP	GS	MPG	FG%	3FG%	FT%	RPG	APG	SPG	BPG	PPG
Cam Long	33	33	32.7	.462	.404	.748	4.8	3.2	1.1	.1	11.7
John Vaughan	31	29	32.3	.418	.369	.747	4.5	1.6	.9	.5	10.8
Darryl Monroe	33	33	29.6	.573	.000	.574	7.7	2.1	1.1	.5	10.5
Dre Smith	33	32	28.4	.355	.265	.784	2.8	1.0	.8	.2	8.9
Ryan Pearson	32	1	17.1	.488	.000	.643	3.8	.7	.6	.8	7.0
Louis Birdsong	33	32	22.8	.488	.308	.702	3.5	.6	.8	1.1	6.4
Andre Cornelius	33	3	18.8	.399	.324	.545	1.8	1.3	.5	.1	5.5
Mike Morrison	31	0	10.8	.545	.000	.302	2.5	.3	.1	.7	4.0
Vlad Moldoveanu	7	0	9.9	.353	.375	.500	2.1	.6	.0	.0	2.3
Isaiah Tate	28	0	9.2	.333	.257	.375	1.6	.4	.2	.0	1.9
Jimmy Nolan	6	0	4.0	.375	.333	.000	.3	.5	.0	.0	1.3
Brian Henderson	5	0	2.6	.250	1.000	.000	.4	.2	.0	.0	0.6
Chris Fleming	10	1	6.0	.125	.000	1.000	1.8	.4	.1	.1	0.4

== Game log ==
Date time, TV	Rank^{#}	Opponent^{#}	Result	Record	High points	High rebounds	High assists	Site (attendance) city, state
Non-conference regular season
November 15, 2008*; 1:00 pm		at Vermont	W 80–79 ^{OT}	1–0	19 – Monroe	17 – Monroe	5 – Cornelius	Patrick Gymnasium (3,266); Burlington, VT
November 17, 2008*; 7:00 pm		Brown	W 89–52	2–0	15 – Morrison	8 – Moldoveanu	4 – Cornelius	Patriot Center (5,469); Fairfax, VA
November 20, 2008*; 7:00 pm		at Hampton	L 44–50	2–1	15 – Birdsong	11 – Monroe	1 – Tied (4)	Convocation Center (2,147); Hampton, VA
November 22, 2008*; 4:30 pm		at East Carolina	W 77–71	3–1	19 – Cornelius	9 – Monroe	6 – Long	Williams Arena at Minges Coliseum (4,781); Greenville, NC
November 25, 2008*; 7:00 pm, MASN		Mount St. Mary's	W 72–60	4–1	22 – Vaughan	8 – Birdsong, Monroe	3 – Birdsong, Monroe, Smith	Patriot Center (5,512); Fairfax, VA
November 29, 2008*; 4:00 pm		Ohio	W 74–65	5–1	15 – Long, Smith	9 – Monroe	5 – Long	Patriot Center (5,159); Fairfax, VA
December 1, 2008*; 7:00 pm, MASN		at Liberty	L 66–69 ^{OT}	5–2	18 – Long	13 – Monroe	6 – Vaughan	Vines Center (4,172); Lynchburg, VA
December 6, 2008; 4:30 pm, CN8		at Drexel	W 56–55	6–2 (1–0)	9 – Monroe	5 – Monroe	5 – Monroe	Daskalakis Athletic Center (1,406); Philadelphia, PA
December 19, 2008*; 7:00 pm, MASN		Radford	W 67–55	7–2	21 – Long	6 – Long	5 – Long	Patriot Center (5,164); Fairfax, VA
December 22, 2008*; 7:00 pm		Tulane	W 60–52	8–2	16 – Vaughan	13 – Pearson	5 – Long	Patriot Center (4,508); Fairfax, VA
December 30, 2008*; 7:00 pm, MASN		at Dayton	L 62–66	8–3	22 – Smith	7 – Smith	4 – Long	University of Dayton Arena (13,107); Dayton, OH
CAA regular season
January 3, 2009; 7:00 pm, MASN		UNC-Wilmington	W 101–60	9–3 (2–0)	20 – Vaughan	8 – Monroe	5 – Long, Vaughan	Patriot Center (8,010); Fairfax, VA
January 5, 2009; 5:00 pm, Fios 1		Georgia State	W 58–52	10–3 (3–0)	18 – Long	11 – Monroe	3 – Long	Patriot Center (3,841); Fairfax, VA
January 7, 2009; 7:00 pm		at Towson	W 71–59	11–3 (4–0)	16 – Monroe	10 – Monroe	5 – Smith	Towson Center (1,507); Towson, MD
January 10, 2009; 2:00 pm, Comcast Sportsnet		Old Dominion	W 61–53	12–3 (5–0)	14 – Monroe	14 – Monroe	5 – Vaughan	Patriot Center (6,626); Fairfax, VA
January 14, 2009; 7:00 pm		at William & Mary	W 61–57	13–3 (6–0)	14 – Smith	9 – Monroe	4 – Long	Kaplan Arena (2,283); Williamsburg, VA
January 17, 2009; 2:00 pm, CN8		James Madison	W 71–57	14–3 (7–0)	15 – Birdsong	11 – Monroe	4 – Monroe	Patriot Center (8,665); Fairfax, VA
January 21, 2009; 7:00 pm, MASN		at Northeastern	L 57–58	14–4 (7–1)	19 – Vaughan	4 – Birdsong, Long, Monroe	3 – Long	Matthews Arena (2,300); Boston
January 24, 2009; 4:00 pm, ESPN2		at VCU	L 71–76	14–5 (7–2)	24 – Long	7 – Pearson	4 – Long	Stuart C. Siegel Center (7,594); Richmond, VA
January 27, 2009; 7:00 pm, CN8		Delaware	W 78–55	15–5 (8–2)	14 – Morrison, Smith	10 – Long	6 – Long	Patriot Center (4,845); Fairfax, VA
January 31, 2009; 7:00 pm, Comcast		at Old Dominion	L 71–73	15–6 (8–3)	18 – Pearson	7 – Vaughan	7 – Monroe	Ted Constant Convocation Center (8,424); Norfolk, VA
February 3, 2009; 7:00 pm, ESPNU		Hofstra	W 78–54	16–6 (9–3)	16 – Pearson, Vaughan	7 – Long, Vaughan	4 – Cornelius	Patriot Center (5,067); Fairfax, VA
February 7, 2009; 2:00 pm, Comcast		at James Madison	L 66–68	16–7 (9–4)	19 – Vaughan	6 – Birdsong, Long	4 – Monroe	Convocation Center (5,470); Harrisonburg, VA
February 12, 2009; 7:00 pm, ESPNU		at Delaware	W 58–6	16–8 (9–5)	27 – Monroe	11 – Monroe	2 – Birdsong, Monroe	Patriot Center (3,062); Fairfax, VA
February 14, 2009; 12:00 pm, Comcast		Northeastern; Homecoming	W 64–53	17–8 (10–5)	16 – Vaughan	10 – Long	3 – Vaughan	Patriot Center (9,840); Fairfax, VA
February 18, 2009; 7:00 pm, Fios 1		Drexel	W 49–48	18–8 (11–5)	15 – Monroe	9 – Monroe	2 – Long	Patriot Center (5,579); Fairfax, VA
February 21, 2009*; 9:30 pm, ESPNU		at Creighton; ESPN Bracket Busters	L 63–76	18–9	23 – Long	10 – Monroe	6 – Monroe	Qwest Center Omaha (17,411); Omaha, NE
February 25, 2009; 7:00 pm, MASN		at UNC-Wilmington	W 53–52	19–9 (12–5)	13 – Smith	11 – Vaughan	4 – Long	Trask Coliseum (3,625); Wilmington, NC
February 28, 2009; 8:00 pm, MASN		Towson	W 71–59	20–9 (13–5)	13 – Monroe, Smith	9 – Monroe	2 – Long, Monroe, Vaughan	Patriot Center (9,840); Fairfax, VA
CAA tournament
March 7, 2009; 6:00 pm, Comcast	(2)	vs. (7) James Madison; Quarterfinals	W 61–53	21–9	12 – Monroe, Long	9 – Birdsong	3 – Vaughan	Richmond Coliseum (N/A); Richmond, VA
March 8, 2009; 5:30 pm, Comcast	(2)	vs. (11) Towson; Semifinals	W 56–48	22–9	15 – Monroe	9 – Birdsong	5 – Long	Richmond Coliseum (7,925); Richmond, VA
March 9, 2009; 7:00 pm, ESPN2	(2)	vs. (1) VCU; Championship	L 50–71	22–10	23 – Smith	6 – Long	3 – Long	Richmond Coliseum (11,200); Richmond, VA
National Invitation tournament
March 17, 2009; 8:00 pm, ESPNU	(7)	at (2) Penn State; First Round, No. 2 vs No. 7	L 73–77 ^{OT}	22–11	16 – Long	8 – Morrison	4 – Long	Bryce Jordan Center (5,549); State College, PA
*Non-conference game. ^{#}Rankings from AP Poll. (#) Tournament seedings in parentheses. All times are in Eastern Time.

== Recruiting ==
The following is a list of players signed for the 2009–10 season:

College recruiting information
Name	Hometown	School	Height	Weight	Commit date
Rashaad Whack; SG	Forestville, Maryland	Bishop McNamara	6 ft 2 in (1.88 m)	170 lb (77 kg)	Sep 6, 2008
Rashaad Whack; SG	Recruit ratings: Scout: Rivals: (86)				
Paris Bennett; SF	Elizabeth, New Jersey	St. Patrick's	6 ft 6 in (1.98 m)	190 lb (86 kg)	Sep 21, 2008
Paris Bennett; SF	Recruit ratings: Scout: Rivals: (85)				
Vertrail Vaughns; PG	Mesquite, Texas	Mesquite	6 ft 2 in (1.88 m)	185 lb (84 kg)	Sep 28, 2008
Vertrail Vaughns; PG	Recruit ratings: Scout: Rivals: (85)				
Johnnie Williams; PF	Memphis, Tennessee	Briarcrest Christian	6 ft 8 in (2.03 m)	205 lb (93 kg)	Oct 19, 2008
Johnnie Williams; PF	Recruit ratings: Scout: Rivals: (89)				
Luke Hancock; SF	Chatham, Virginia	Hargrove Military Academy	6 ft 5 in (1.96 m)	175 lb (79 kg)	Oct 19, 2008
Luke Hancock; SF	Recruit ratings: Scout: Rivals: (86)				
Sherrod Wright; SG	Mount Vernon, New York	Mount Vernon	6 ft 4 in (1.93 m)	190 lb (86 kg)	Apr 17, 2009
Sherrod Wright; SG	Recruit ratings: Scout: Rivals: (89)				
Overall recruit ranking:
Note: In many cases, Scout, Rivals, 247Sports, On3, and ESPN may conflict in their listings of height and weight.; In these cases, the average was taken. ESPN grades are on a 100-point scale.; Sources: "ESPN". ESPN.; "2009 Team Ranking". Rivals.
