= Quincy High School (Quincy, Washington) =

Location
- 16 Sixth Avenue S.E. Quincy, Washington; United States
- Coordinates: 47°14′12″N 119°50′29″W

Information
- Teaching staff: 47.12 (FTE)
- Enrollment: 860 (2024–2025)
- Student to teacher ratio: 18.25
- Campus type: open
- Color
- Mascot: Jackrabbit
- Website: Quincy H.S.

Quincy High School is a public high school serving 770 students in grades 9–12 located in Quincy, Washington, United States. The current principal is Dr. Marcus Pimpleton. It's athletics nickname is The Jacks. This is a reference to the black-tailed jackrabbits which once inhabited the area. Although they are now considered to be a highly endangered species in the Washington area, these hares were once so abundant, they were hunted for sport. The jackrabbits were hunted so frequently, they quickly became a scarcity. Now legally protected, the jackrabbit population is slowly returning. In homage of the creatures who were nearly hunted to extinction, Quincy High School has since made the black-tailed jackrabbit their official mascot.

Quincy High is known for its Career and Technical Education programs that include:

- Business and Marketing
- Culinary Arts
- Textile Arts
- American Sign Language
- Video Production
- Pre Engineering
- Construction
- Fire Science

Quincy High was recognized in 2012, by the Washington State Office of Superintendent of Public Instruction, for efforts that have significantly reduced the achievement gap in test scores for underserved populations.
