= March 2009 in sports =

<<	March 2009					>>
Su	Mo	Tu	We	Th	Fr	Sa
1	2	3	4	5	6	7
8	9	10	11	12	13	14
15	16	17	18	19	20	21
22	23	24	25	26	27	28
29	30	31
Sports

This list shows notable sports-related deaths, events, and notable outcomes that occurred in March of 2009.

== Current sporting seasons ==
=== Australian rules football 2009 ===
- Australian Football League

=== Auto racing 2009 ===
- Formula One
- Sprint Cup
- Nationwide Series
- Camping World Truck Series
- A1 Grand Prix
- GP2 Asia Series
- WTTC
- V8 Supercar
- Speedcar Series
- American Le Mans
- Rolex Sports Car Series
- Super GT

=== Basketball 2008–09 ===
- American competitions:
  - NBA
  - NCAA men tournament
  - NCAA women tournament
- Pan-European competitions:
  - Euroleague
  - Eurocup
  - EuroChallenge
- Greece
- Iran
- Israel
- Italy
- Philippines
  - Fiesta Conference
- Spain
- Turkey

=== Football (soccer) ===
- 2008–09
  - 2010 FIFA World Cup Qualifying
  - UEFA (Europe) Champions League
  - UEFA Cup
  - Copa Libertadores (South America)
  - CONCACAF (North & Central America) Champions League
  - OFC (Oceania) Champions League
  - AFC (Asia) Champions League
  - CAF (Africa) Champions League
  - England
  - Germany
  - Iran
  - Italy
  - Spain
  - France
  - Argentina
- 2009
  - USA
  - Japan

=== Golf 2009 ===
- European Tour
- PGA Tour
- LPGA Tour

=== Ice hockey 2008–09 ===
- National Hockey League
- Kontinental Hockey League

=== Motorcycle racing 2009 ===
- Superbike World championship
- Supersport racing

=== Rugby league 2009 ===
- Super League
- NRL

=== Rugby union 2008–09 ===
- Heineken Cup
- English Premiership
- Celtic League
- Top 14
- Super 14
- Sevens World Series

== Days of the month ==
=== March 31, 2009 (Tuesday) ===
==== Basketball ====
- Euroleague Quarterfinals:
  - Game 3 of best-of-5 series:
    - TAU Cerámica (Spain) 69–62 (Spain) Regal FC Barcelona. **TAU leads series 2–1.**
    - Real Madrid (Spain) 71–63 (Greece) Olympiacos Piraeus. **Olympiacos leads series 2–1.**
    - Montepaschi Siena (Italy) 53–72 (Greece) Panathinaikos Athens. **Panathinaikos leads series 2–1.**
    - Partizan Igokea (Serbia) 56–67 (Russia) CSKA Moscow. **CSKA wins series 3–0.**
      - CSKA advance to the Final Four for the seventh straight season.
- NCAA Division I Women's Tournament
  - Regional Finals (seeding in parentheses):
    - Trenton region in Trenton, New Jersey:
      - (1) Connecticut 83, (6) Arizona State 64
    - Oklahoma City region in Oklahoma City, Oklahoma:
      - (1) Oklahoma 74, (6) Purdue 68
- National Invitation Tournament:
  - Final Four in New York:
    - Semifinals:
      - Baylor 76, San Diego State 62
      - Penn State 67, Notre Dame 59
- CollegeInsider.com Tournament:
  - Championship game in Peoria, Illinois:
    - Old Dominion 66, Bradley 62
- NBA:
  - The Denver Nuggets clinch a playoff berth with 111–104 win over the New York Knicks.
  - The San Antonio Spurs also clinch a playoff berth despite losing 95–96 to the Oklahoma City Thunder.

==== Football (soccer) ====
- 2010 FIFA World Cup Qualifying:
  - CONMEBOL (South America), matchday 12:
    - Venezuela 2–0 Colombia
- Friendly internationals:
  - South Africa 0–2 Portugal in Lausanne, Switzerland
  - Angola 0–2 Morocco

=== March 30, 2009 (Monday) ===
==== Basketball ====
- NCAA Division I Women's Tournament
  - Regional Finals (seeding in parentheses, all times EDT):
    - Raleigh region in Raleigh, North Carolina:
      - (3) Louisville 77, (1) Maryland 60
    - Berkeley region in Berkeley, California:
      - (2) Stanford 74, (4) Iowa State 53
- College Basketball Invitational:
  - Championship best-of-3 series, game 1 in Corvallis, Oregon:
    - Oregon State 75, UTEP 69

==== Cricket ====
- India in New Zealand:
  - 2nd Test in Napier, day 5:
    - New Zealand 619/9d; India 305 and 476/4 (f/o, Gautam Gambhir 137, V.V.S. Laxman 124*). **Match drawn, India lead 3-match series 1–0**.

=== March 29, 2009 (Sunday) ===
==== Auto racing ====
- Formula One:
  - Australian Grand Prix in Melbourne, Australia:
    - (1) (United Kingdom) Jenson Button (2) (Brazil) Rubens Barrichello (3) (United Kingdom) Lewis Hamilton
      - Brawn GP take first and second in their first ever race, with Button becoming the first driver since Juan Manuel Fangio at the French Grand Prix in 1954 to win from pole in a first drive for a brand new team.
      - Jarno Trulli finished third in the race, but was given a 25-second penalty post-race for passing Hamilton under the stabilised safety car conditions, in which the race finished.
- Sprint Cup Series:
  - Goody's Cool Orange 500 in Ridgeway, Virginia:
    - (1) Jimmie Johnson (California) (2) Denny Hamlin (Virginia) (3) Tony Stewart (Indiana)
      - Drivers' standings (after 6 races): (1) Jeff Gordon (California) 959 points (2) Clint Bowyer (Kansas) −89 (3) Kurt Busch (Nevada) −132
- V8 Supercars:
  - Sprint Gas V8 Supercars Manufacturers Challenge in Melbourne:
    - (1) Craig Lowndes (Australia) (2) Mark Winterbottom (Australia) (3) Will Davison (Australia)

==== Basketball ====
- NCAA Division I Men's Tournament:
  - Regional Finals (seeding in parentheses):
    - Midwest region in Indianapolis, Indiana:
      - (2) Michigan State 64, (1) Louisville 52
    - South region in Memphis, Tennessee:
      - (1) North Carolina 72, (2) Oklahoma 60
    - Final Four matchups:
      - Michigan State vs. Connecticut
      - North Carolina vs. Villanova
- NCAA Division I Women's Tournament
  - Regional semifinals (seeding in parentheses):
    - Trenton region in Trenton, New Jersey:
      - (1) Connecticut 77, (4) California 53
      - (6) Arizona State 84, (2) Texas A&M 69
    - Oklahoma City region in Oklahoma City, Oklahoma:
      - (6) Purdue 67, (7) Rutgers 61
      - (1) Oklahoma 70, (4) Pittsburgh 59
        - Sooners center Courtney Paris becomes the first player in U.S. college basketball history—regardless of governing body, division or gender—with 2,500 points and 2,000 rebounds in her career.
- NBA:
  - The Los Angeles Lakers secure the #1 seed in the Western Conference and home advantage in the first three rounds of the playoffs despite losing 76–86 to the Atlanta Hawks, as their nearest rivals, the San Antonio Spurs, lose 86–90 to the New Orleans Hornets.

==== Cricket ====
- India in New Zealand:
  - 2nd Test in Napier, day 4:
    - New Zealand 619/9d; India 305 and 252/2 (f/o, Gautam Gambhir 102*). India trail by 62 runs with 8 wickets remaining.
- England in West Indies:
  - 4th ODI in Bridgetown, Barbados:
    - West Indies 239/9 (50 ov); England 136/1 (18.3/20 ov). **England win by 9 wickets (D/L method), 5-match series level 2–2**.
- Australia in South Africa:
  - 2nd Twenty20 in Centurion:
    - South Africa 156/5 (20/20 ov); Australia 139/8 (20/20 ov). **South Africa win by 17 runs and win 2-match series 2–0**.

==== Cycling ====
- Track World Championships in Pruszków, Poland:
  - Women's keirin: (gold) Guo Shuang (China) (silver) Clara Sanchez (France) (bronze) Willy Kanis (Netherlands)
  - Men's omnium: (gold) Leigh Howard (Australia) 19 pts (silver) Zachary Bell (Canada) 21 (bronze) Tim Veldt (Netherlands) 24
  - Women's points race 25 km: (gold) Giorgia Bronzini (Italy) 18 pts (silver) Yumari González (Cuba) 15 (bronze) Elizabeth Armitstead (United Kingdom) 13
  - Men's sprint:
    - Final: (gold) Grégory Baugé (France) beat (silver) Azizul Hasni Awang (Malaysia) 2–1
    - Bronze medal race: (bronze) Kévin Sireau (France) beat Shane Perkins (Australia) 2–0

==== Football (soccer) ====
- 2010 FIFA World Cup Qualifying:
  - COMNEBOL (South America), matchday 11:
    - Ecuador 1–1 Brazil
    - Peru 1–3 Chile
      - Standings after 11 of 18 rounds: Paraguay 23 pts, Argentina, Chile 19, Brazil 18, Uruguay 16, Colombia 14, Ecuador 13, Venezuela 10, Bolivia 9, Peru 7.
  - CAF (Africa) third round, matchday 1:
    - Group 2:
      - Mozambique 0–0 Nigeria
    - Group 3:
      - Egypt 1–1 Zambia
    - Group 4:
      - Ghana 1–0 Benin
    - Group 5:
      - Ivory Coast 5–0 Malawi
        - 22 spectators die and more than a hundred are injured in a stampede after a wall collapse in Félix Houphouët-Boigny Stadium shortly before the kick-off.

==== Golf ====
- PGA Tour:
  - Arnold Palmer Invitational in Orlando, Florida:
    - Winner: Tiger Woods (United States) 275 (−5)
      - Woods wins his first title since his comeback from injury and sixth title at this tournament.
- European Tour:
  - Open de Andalucia in Andalusia, Spain:
    - Winner: Søren Kjeldsen (Denmark) 274 (−14)
- LPGA Tour:
  - Phoenix LPGA International in Phoenix, Arizona:
    - Winner: Karrie Webb (Australia) 274 (−14)

==== Ice hockey ====
- NHL:
  - The Detroit Red Wings clinch the Central Division title as their nearest rivals, the Chicago Blackhawks, lose 0–4 to the Vancouver Canucks.

==== Rowing ====
- 155th University Boat Race on the River Thames, London:
  - **Oxford University Boat Club** (Michal Plotkowiak, Colin Smith, Alex Hearne, Ben Harrison, Sjoerd Hamburger, Tom Solesbury, George Bridgewater, Ante Kušurin, Colin Groshong) 17:00 beat Cambridge University Boat Club (Rob Weitemeyer, Henry Pelly, Ryan Monaghan, Peter Marsland, Deaglan McEachern, Hardy Cubasch, Tom Ransley, Silas Stafford, Rebecca Dowbiggin) by 12 secs (3½ lengths)
    - The Dark Blues' win reduces Cambridge's overall lead to 79 against 75, with one dead heat.

==== Rugby union ====
- Sevens World Series:
  - Hong Kong Sevens in Hong Kong
    - Final: South Africa 24–26 **Fiji**

==== Winter sports ====
===== Biathlon =====
- World Cup 9 in Khanty-Mansiysk, Russia:
  - 15 km mass start men: (1) Simon Eder (Austria) 37min 14.4sec (0 penalties) (2) Dominik Landertinger (Austria) at 12.1 (1) (3) Ole Einar Bjørndalen (Norway) 17.0 (3)
    - Final overall World Cup standings (after 26 events): (1) Bjørndalen 1080 points (2) Tomasz Sikora (Poland) 870 (3) Emil Hegle Svendsen (Norway) 844
    - Final World Cup mass-start standings (after five events): (1) Landertinger 208 points (2) Bjørndalen 199 (3) Christoph Sumann (Austria) 197
  - 12.5 km mass start women: (1) Simone Hauswald (Germany) 36:54.6 (1 penalty) (2) Helena Jonsson (Sweden) at 15.1 (0) (3) Andrea Henkel (Germany) 26.9 (3)... 6. Kati Wilhelm (Germany) 1:20.3 (2)
    - Final overall World Cup standings (after 26 events): (1) Jonsson 952 points (2) Wilhelm 952 (3) Tora Berger (Norway) 894
      - Jonsson wins the title because she won 4 races against 3 wins for Wilhelm.
    - Final World Cup mass-start standings (after five events): (1) Jonsson 210 points (2) Wilhelm 186 (3) Hauswald 174

===== Curling =====
- World Women's Championship in Gangneung, South Korea: (seeding in parentheses)
  - Final:
    - (gold) (1) China 8–6 (silver) (4) Sweden
  - Bronze medal game:
    - (bronze) (2) Denmark 7–6 (3) Canada

=== March 28, 2009 (Saturday) ===
==== Athletics ====
- World Cross Country Championships in Amman, Jordan:
  - Senior men – 12 km: (gold) Gebregziabher Gebremariam 35:02 (silver) Moses Kipsiro (Uganda) 35:04 (bronze) Zersenay Tadese 35:04
    - Teams: (gold) Kenya 28 (silver) Ethiopia 28 (bronze) Eritrea 50
  - Senior women – 8 km: (gold) Florence Jebet Kiplagat 26:13 (silver) Linet Chepkwemoi Masai 26:16 (bronze) Meselech Melkamu 26:19
    - Teams: (gold) Kenya 14 (silver) Ethiopia 28 (bronze) Portugal 72

==== Basketball ====
- NCAA Division I Men's Tournament:
  - Regional Finals (seeding in parentheses):
    - West region in Glendale, Arizona:
      - (1) Connecticut 82, (3) Missouri 75
    - East region in Boston, Massachusetts:
      - (3) Villanova 78, (1) Pittsburgh 76
- NCAA Division I Women's Tournament
  - Regional semifinals (seeding in parentheses):
    - Raleigh region in Raleigh, North Carolina:
      - (3) Louisville 56, (2) Baylor 39
      - (1) Maryland 78, (4) Vanderbilt 74
    - Berkeley region in Berkeley, California:
      - (4) Iowa State 69, (9) Michigan State 68
      - (2) Stanford 84, (3) Ohio State 66

==== Cricket ====
- India in New Zealand:
  - 2nd Test in Napier, day 3:
    - New Zealand 619/9d; India 305 and 47/1 (f/o). India trail by 267 runs with 9 wickets remaining.

==== Cycling ====
- Track World Championships in Pruszków, Poland:
  - Women's omnium: (gold) Josephine Tomic (Australia) 26 (silver) Tara Whitten (Canada) 27 (bronze) Yvonne Hijgenaar (Netherlands) 27
  - Women's Sprint:
    - Final: (gold) Victoria Pendleton (United Kingdom) bt (silver) Willy Kanis (Netherlands) 2–1
    - Bronze medal race: (bronze) Simona Krupeckaitė (Lithuania) bt Olga Panarina (Belarus) 2–0
  - Men's madison 50 km: (gold) Denmark (Michael Mørkøv, Alex Rasmussen) (silver) Australia (Leigh Howard, Cameron Meyer) (bronze) Czech Republic (Martin Bláha, Jiří Hochmann)

==== Football (soccer) ====
- 2010 FIFA World Cup Qualifying:
  - UEFA (Europe):
    - Group 1:
      - Malta 0–3 Denmark
      - Albania 0–1 Hungary
      - Portugal 0–0 Sweden
        - Denmark and Hungary lead the group on 10 points.
    - Group 2:
      - Luxembourg 0–4 Latvia
      - Moldova 0–2 Switzerland
      - Israel 1–1 Greece
        - Greece and Switzerland share the lead on 10 points, with Israel one point behind.
    - Group 3:
      - Northern Ireland 3–2 Poland
      - Slovenia 0–0 Czech Republic
        - Northern Ireland goes to the top of the group on 10 points from 6 games, followed by Slovakia on 9 points from 4 games.
    - Group 4:
      - Russia 2–0 Azerbaijan
      - Wales 0–2 Finland
      - Germany 4–0 Liechtenstein
        - Germany lead the group on 13 points, Russia second on 9 points and a game in hand.
    - Group 5:
      - Armenia 2–2 Estonia
      - Belgium 2–4 Bosnia and Herzegovina
      - Spain 1–0 Turkey
        - Spain lead the group with perfect record of 15 points from 5 games.
    - Group 7:
      - Romania 2–3 Serbia
      - Lithuania 0–1 France
        - Serbia on top with 12 points, followed by Lithuania on 9 points.
    - Group 8:
      - Cyprus 2–1 Georgia
      - Montenegro 0–2 Italy
      - Republic of Ireland 1–1 Bulgaria
        - Italy takes sole possession of first place on 13 points, 2 points ahead of Ireland.
    - Group 9:
      - Netherlands 3–0 Scotland
        - Netherlands maintains its perfect record with 12 points from 4 games.
  - COMNEBOL (South America), matchday 11:
    - Uruguay 2–0 Paraguay
    - Argentina 4–0 Venezuela
    - Colombia 2–0 Bolivia
      - Argentina win its first official match with Diego Maradona as coach, and leap over Brazil into second place on 19 points, 4 points befind leader Paraguay. Uruguay goes into fourth place on 16 pts. Colombia in sixth place on 14 pts.
  - CONCACAF (North-Central America) fourth round, matchday 2:
    - Trinidad and Tobago 1–1 Honduras
      - The Soca Warriors salvage a point at home courtesy of a Khaleem Hyland goal in the 90th minute.
    - Mexico 2–0 Costa Rica
      - Mexico gets level with Costa Rica in second place on 3 points.
    - El Salvador 2–2 United States
      - Team USA comes back from a 2–0 deficit in San Salvador behind goals from Jozy Altidore and Frankie Hejduk, and takes sole possession of first place in the hexagonal with 4 points from 2 matches.
  - AFC (Asia) fourth round, matchday 6:
    - Group A:
      - Japan 1–0 Bahrain
        - Japan goes to the top of the group, with 11 points from 5 games, ahead of Australia with 10 pts from 4 games.
      - Uzbekistan 4–0 Qatar
        - Uzbekistan gets level with Bahrain and Qatar on 5 points
    - Group B:
      - North Korea 2–0 United Arab Emirates
        - North Korea goes to the top of the group with 10 points from 5 games, ahead of South Korea with 8 points from 4 games.
      - Iran 1–2 Saudi Arabia
        - Saudi Arabia replace Iran in third place on 7 points.
  - CAF (Africa) third round, matchday 1:
    - Group 1:
      - Togo 1–0 Cameroon
      - Morocco 1–2 Gabon
    - Group 2:
      - Kenya 1–2 Tunisia
    - Group 3:
      - Rwanda 0–0 Algeria
    - Group 4:
      - Sudan 1–1 Mali
    - Group 5:
      - Burkina Faso 4–2 Guinea
- Friendly internationals:
  - England 4–0 Slovakia
    - David Beckham comes in as substitute for his 109th cap, a record for an English outfield player.
  - South Africa 2–1 Norway
  - South Korea 2–1 Iraq
- OFC Champions League Group stage, matchday 6:
  - Group B: Koloale FC Honiara (Solomon Islands) 1–0 (Fiji) Ba F.C.
    - Koloale advance to the final.

==== Winter sports ====
===== Biathlon =====
- World Cup 9 in Khanty-Mansiysk, Russia:
  - 12.5 km pursuit men: (1) Emil Hegle Svendsen (Norway) 33mins 03.3secs (2 penalties) (2) Ole Einar Bjørndalen (Norway) at 0.1 (2) (3) Christoph Sumann (Austria) 23.8 (2)
    - Overall World Cup standings (after 25 of 26 events): (1) Bjørndalen 1032 points (champion) (2) Tomasz Sikora (Poland) 863 (3) Svendsen 818
    - Final World Cup pursuit standings (after seven events): (1) Bjørndalen 342 (2) Svendsen 308 (3) Sikora 276
  - 10 km pursuit women: (1) Magdalena Neuner (Germany) 27min 53.0sec (2 penalties) (2) Michela Ponza (Italy) at 28.8 (0) (3) Marie Dorin (France) 30.5 (1)
    - Overall World Cup standings (after 25 of 26 events): (1) Helena Jonsson (Sweden) 915 points (2) Kati Wilhelm (Germany) 915 (3) Neuner 878
    - Final World Cup pursuit standings (after seven events): (1) Wilhelm 272 points (2) Tora Berger (Norway) 246 (3) Martina Beck (Germany) 244

===== Curling =====
- World Women's Championship in Gangneung, South Korea: (seeding in parentheses)
  - Playoffs:
    - (3) Canada 4–5 (4) Sweden (11 ends)
      - Sweden will play against Denmark in the semifinal, Canada will play for bronze medal.
  - Semifinal:
    - (2) Denmark 6–7 (4) Sweden
      - Sweden advance to the final against China, Denmark will play for bronze medal against Canada.

===== Figure skating =====
- World Championships in Los Angeles, United States:
  - Ladies: (gold) Kim Yuna (South Korea) 207.71 (silver) Joannie Rochette (Canada) 191.29 (bronze) Miki Ando (Japan) 190.38
    - Kim becomes the first ever World champion in figure skating from Korea, and the first woman to score over 200 points. Rochette is the first Canadian woman to win a medal in 21 years.

=== March 27, 2009 (Friday) ===
==== Basketball ====
- NCAA Division I Men's Tournament:
  - Regional semifinals (seeding in parentheses):
    - Midwest region in Indianapolis, Indiana:
      - (1) Louisville 103, (12) Arizona 64
      - (2) Michigan State 67, (3) Kansas 62
    - South region in Memphis, Tennessee:
      - (2) Oklahoma 84, (3) Syracuse 71
      - (1) North Carolina 98, (4) Gonzaga 77

==== Cricket ====
- India in New Zealand:
  - 2nd Test in Napier, day 2:
    - New Zealand 619/9d (Jesse Ryder 201, Brendon McCullum 115); India 79/3. India trail by 540 runs with 7 wickets remaining in the 1st innings.
- England in West Indies:
  - 3rd ODI in Bridgetown, Barbados:
    - England 117 (41.3/44 ov); West Indies 117/2 (14.4/44 ov, Chris Gayle 80). **West Indies win by 8 wickets (D/L method), lead 5-match series 2–1**.
- Australia in South Africa:
  - 1st Twenty20 in Johannesburg:
    - Australia 166/7 (20/20 ov, David Hussey 88*); South Africa 168/6 (19.2/20 ov). **South Africa win by 4 wickets with 4 balls remaining, lead 2-match series 1–0**.

==== Cycling ====
- Track World Championships in Pruszków, Poland:
  - Men's 1 km time trial: (gold) Stefan Nimke (Germany) 1:00.666 (silver) Taylor Phinney (United States) 1:01.611 (bronze) Mohd Rizal Tisin (Malaysia) 1:01.658
  - Women's scratch 10 km: (gold) Yumari González Valdinieso (Cuba) (silver) Lizzie Armitstead (United Kingdom) (bronze) Belinda Goss (Australia)
  - Men's team pursuit:
    - Final: (gold) Denmark (Casper Jørgensen, Jens-Erik Madsen, Michael Mørkøv, Alex Rasmussen) 3min 58.246 bt (silver) Australia (Jack Bobridge, Rohan Dennis, Leigh Howard, Cameron Meyer) 3:58.863
    - Bronze medal race: (bronze) New Zealand (Westley Gough, Peter Latham, Marc Ryan, Jesse Sergent) 4:00.248 bt Great Britain (Jonathan Bellis, Steven Burke, Ed Clancy, Peter Kennaugh) 4:01.838

==== Winter sports ====
===== Biathlon =====
- World Cup 9 in Khanty-Mansiysk, Russia:
  - 7.5 km sprint women: (1) Tina Bachmann (Germany) 20min 49.8sec (0 penalties) (2) Simone Hauswald (Germany) at 3.7s (0) (3) Anna Carin Olofsson-Zidek (Sweden) 19.3 (0)
    - Overall World Cup standings (after 24 of 26 events): (1) Helena Jonsson (Sweden) 904 points (2) Kati Wilhelm (Germany) 893 (3) Magdalena Neuner (Germany) 832
    - Final World Cup sprint standings (after 10 events): (1) Jonsson 372 points (2) Neuner 358 (3) Tora Berger (Norway) 352

===== Curling =====
- World Women's Championship in Gangneung, South Korea: (seeding in parentheses)
  - Playoffs:
    - (1) China 6–3 (2) Denmark
      - China advance to the final, Denmark will play against Canada/Sweden winner

===== Figure skating =====
- World Championships in Los Angeles, United States:
  - Ladies' short program: (1) Kim Yuna (South Korea) 76.12 (2) Joannie Rochette (Canada) 67.90 (3) Mao Asada (Japan) 66.06
  - Ice dance: (gold) Oksana Domnina / Maxim Shabalin (Russia) 206.30 (silver) Tanith Belbin / Benjamin Agosto (United States) 205.08 (bronze) Tessa Virtue / Scott Moir (Canada) 200.40

=== March 26, 2009 (Thursday) ===
==== Basketball ====
- Euroleague Quarterfinals:
  - Game 2 of best-of-5 series:
    - CSKA Moscow (Russia) 77–50 (Serbia) Partizan Igokea. **CSKA leads series 2–0.**
    - Olympiacos Piraeus (Greece) 79–73 (Spain) Real Madrid. **Olympiacos leads series 2–0.**
    - Regal FC Barcelona (Spain) 85–62 (Spain) TAU Cerámica. **Series tied 1–1.**
    - Panathinaikos Athens (Greece) 79–84 (Italy) Montepaschi Siena. **Series tied 1–1.**
- NCAA Division I Men's Tournament:
  - Regional semifinals (seeding in parentheses):
    - West region in Glendale, Arizona:
      - (1) Connecticut 72, (5) Purdue 60
      - (3) Missouri 102, (2) Memphis 91
    - East region in Boston, Massachusetts:
      - (1) Pittsburgh 60, (4) Xavier 55
      - (3) Villanova 77, (2) Duke 54

==== Cricket ====
- India in New Zealand:
  - 2nd Test in Napier, day 1:
    - New Zealand 351/4 (Ross Taylor 151, Jesse Ryder 137*)

==== Cycling ====
- Track World Championships in Pruszków, Poland:
  - Men's scratch 15 km: (gold) Morgan Kneisky (France) (silver) Angel Colla (Argentina) (bronze) Andreas Müller (Austria)
  - Women's team sprint:
    - Final: (gold) Australia (Anna Meares, Kaarle McCulloch) 33.149sec bt (silver) Great Britain (Shanaze Reade, Victoria Pendleton) 33.380
    - Bronze medal race: (bronze) Lithuania (Gintarė Gaivenytė, Simona Krupeckaitė) 33.495 bt France (Sandie Clair, Clara Sanchez) 33.638
  - Men's individual pursuit:
    - Final: (gold) Taylor Phinney (United States) 4min 15.160sec bt (silver) Jack Bobridge (Australia) 4:17.419
    - Bronze medal race: (bronze) Dominique Cornu (Belgium) 4:19.197 bt Volodymyr Dyudya (Ukraine) 4:19.786
  - Women's team pursuit:
    - Final: (gold) Great Britain (Wendy Houvenaghel, Joanna Rowsell, Lizzie Armitstead) 3:25.147 bt (silver) New Zealand (Lauren Ellis, Jaime Nielsen, Alison Shanks) 3:26.023
    - Bronze medal race: (bronze) Australia (Ashlee Ankudinoff, Sarah Kent, Josephine Tomic) 3:27.719 bt Netherlands (Vera Koedooder, Amy Pieters, Ellen van Dijk) 3:30.893
  - Men's keirin: (gold) Maximilian Levy (Germany) (silver) François Pervis (France) (bronze) Teun Mulder (Netherlands)

==== Winter sports ====
===== Biathlon =====
- World Cup 9 in Khanty-Mansiysk, Russia:
  - 10 km sprint men: (1) Arnd Peiffer (Germany) 25min 51.1sec (0 penalties) (2) Ole Einar Bjørndalen (Norway) at 23.1s (1) (3) Christoph Sumann (Austria) 27.3 (0)
    - World Cup overall standings (after 24 of 26 events): (1) Bjørndalen 978 points (2) Tomasz Sikora (Poland) 854 (3) Emil Hegle Svendsen (Norway) & Maxim Tchoudov (Russia) 758
      - Bjørndalen secure his sixth overall World Cup title.
    - Final World Cup sprint standings (after 10 events): (1) Bjørndalen 372 points (2) Sikora 337 (3) Svendsen 318

===== Curling =====
- World Women's Championship in Gangneung, South Korea:
  (teams in **bold** advance to the playoff, teams in italics play in tiebreaker)
  - Draw 15:
    - Sweden 7–8 **China**
    - Scotland 7–6 United States
    - Italy 5–8 **Canada**
      - Canada secure a playoff berth.
    - South Korea 8–10 Russia
      - Standings after 15 draws: China 9–1, Canada 8–2, Denmark 7–2, Sweden 6–4, Switzerland 5–4, Russia, Scotland 5–5, Germany 4–5.
  - Draw 16:
    - **Denmark** 6–2 Scotland
      - Denmark secure a playoff berth, while Scotland is eliminated
    - Norway 2–11 Sweden
      - Sweden secure at least a tiebreaker place.
    - Germany 9–6 South Korea
    - Switzerland 8–5 Italy
      - Switzerland remain in contention for a tiebreaker.
      - Standings after 16 draws: China 9–1, Canada, Denmark 8–2, Sweden 7–4, Switzerland 6–4.
  - Draw 17:
    - Russia 6–8 Germany
    - **Canada** 10–7 Switzerland
      - Switzerland's loss means **Sweden** advance to the playoff.
    - United States 3–9 **Denmark**
    - **China** 7–2 Norway
      - Final standings: China 10–1, Denmark, Canada 9–2, Sweden 7–4, Switzerland, Germany 6–5, Russia, Scotland 5–6, USA 4–7, Korea 3–8, Norway, Italy 1–10.

===== Figure skating =====
- World Championships in Los Angeles, United States:
  - Ice dance standings after original dance: (1) Oksana Domnina – Maxim Shabalin (Russia) 105.45 (2) Tanith Belbin – Benjamin Agosto (United States) 104.81 (3) Tessa Virtue – Scott Moir (Canada) 100.42
  - Men: (gold) Evan Lysacek (United States) 242.23 (silver) Patrick Chan (Canada) 237.58 (bronze) Brian Joubert (France) 235.97

=== March 25, 2009 (Wednesday) ===
==== Basketball ====
- NBA:
  - The Orlando Magic clinch the Southeast Division title and at least a #4 seed in the playoff with an 84–82 win over the Boston Celtics.
  - The Atlanta Hawks clinch a playoff berth despite a 92–102 loss to the San Antonio Spurs.

==== Cycling ====
- Track World Championships in Pruszków, Poland:
  - Women's 500 m time trial: (gold) Simona Krupeckaitė (Lithuania) 33.296 (WR) (silver) Anna Meares (Australia) 33.796 (bronze) Victoria Pendleton (United Kingdom) 34.102
  - Men's points race 40 km: (gold) Cameron Meyer (Australia) 24 points (silver) Daniel Kreutzfeldt (Denmark) 22 (bronze) Chris Newton (United Kingdom) 21
  - Women's individual pursuit:
    - Final: (gold) Alison Shanks (New Zealand) 3:29.807 def. (silver) Wendy Houvenaghel (United Kingdom) 3:32.174
    - Bronze medal race: (bronze) Vilija Sereikaitė (Lithuania) 3:33.583 def. Joanna Rowsell (United Kingdom) 3:35.209
  - Men's team sprint:
    - Final: (gold) France (Grégory Baugé, Mickaël Bourgain, Kévin Sireau) 43.512 def. (silver) Great Britain (Matthew Crampton, Jason Kenny, Jamie Staff) 43.869
    - Bronze medal race: (bronze) Germany (René Enders, Robert Förstemann, Stefan Nimke) 43.912 def. Australia (Daniel Ellis, Shane Perkins, Scott Sunderland) 43.986

==== Football (soccer) ====
- Copa Libertadores group stage:
  - Group 7:
    - Aurora (Bolivia) 1–2 (Brazil) Grêmio

==== Ice hockey ====
- NHL:
  - The New Jersey Devils and Washington Capitals clinch playoff berths as a result of Florida Panthers 3–5 loss to Buffalo Sabres.

==== Winter sports ====
===== Curling =====
- World Women's Championship in Gangneung, South Korea:
  - Draw 12:
    - South Korea 6–7 Canada
    - Italy 6–7 Russia (11 ends)
    - Scotland 3–4 China (11 ends)
    - Sweden 5–10 United States
  - Draw 13:
    - United States 2–8 Switzerland
    - China 8–2 Germany
    - Russia 7–2 Norway
    - Canada 5–7 Denmark
  - Draw 14:
    - Norway 8–6 Italy
    - Denmark 4–7 South Korea
    - Switzerland 6–8 Sweden
    - Germany 7–6 Scotland (11 ends)
  - Standings after 14 draws (teams in **bold** advance to the playoffs, teams in italics secure at least a tie breaker, teams in ~~strike~~ are eliminated): **China** 8–1, Canada, Denmark 7–2, Sweden 6–3, Switzerland 5–4, Germany, Russia, Scotland, USA 4–5, ~~Korea~~ 3–6, ~~Italy~~, ~~Norway~~ 1–8.

===== Figure skating =====
- World Championships in Los Angeles, United States:
  - Men's short program: (1) Brian Joubert (France) 84.40 (2) Evan Lysacek (United States) 82.70 (3) Patrick Chan (Canada) 82.55
  - Pairs: (gold) Aliona Savchenko/Robin Szolkowy (Germany) 203.48 (silver) Zhang Dan/Zhang Hao (China) 186.52 (bronze) Yuko Kavaguti/Alexander Smirnov (Russia) 186.39

=== March 24, 2009 (Tuesday) ===
==== Basketball ====
- Euroleague Quarterfinals:
  - Game 1 of best-of-5 series:
    - CSKA Moscow (Russia) 56–47 (Serbia) Partizan Igokea. **CSKA leads series 1–0.**
    - Panathinaikos Athens (Greece) 90–85 (Italy) Montepaschi Siena. **Panathinaikos leads series 1–0.**
    - Olympiacos Piraeus (Greece) 88–79 (Spain) Real Madrid. **Olympiacos leads series 1–0.**
    - Regal FC Barcelona (Spain) 75–84 (Spain) TAU Cerámica. **TAU leads series 1–0.**
- NCAA Division I Women's Tournament:
  - Second round (seeding in parentheses):
    - Trenton Region:
      - (1) Connecticut 87, (8) Florida 59
      - (2) Texas A&M 73, (10) Minnesota 42
    - Berkeley Region:
      - (9) Michigan State 63, (1) Duke 49
      - (4) Iowa State 71, (12) Ball State 57
    - Raleigh Region:
      - (1) Maryland 71, (9) Utah 56
      - (3) Louisville 62, (6) LSU 52
      - (2) Baylor 60, (7) South Dakota State 58
    - Oklahoma City Region:
      - (1) Oklahoma 69, (9) Georgia Tech 50

==== Cricket ====
- News:
  - The Board of Control for Cricket in India announces that the second season of the Indian Premier League will be moved to South Africa due to security concerns. (Cricinfo)

==== Winter sports ====
===== Curling =====
- World Women's Championship in Gangneung, South Korea:
  - Draw 9:
    - China 8–5 Denmark
    - United States 12–7 Norway
    - Canada 8–7 Germany
    - Russia 4–8 Switzerland
  - Draw 10:
    - Germany 10–1 Sweden
    - Switzerland 5–7 Scotland
    - Denmark 7–4 Italy
    - Norway 8–9 South Korea
  - Draw 11:
    - Scotland 4–6 Russia
    - South Korea 2–9 United States
    - Sweden 7–4 Canada
    - Italy 3–9 China
  - Standings after 11 draws: Canada, China, Denmark 6–1, Sweden 5–2, Scotland, Switzerland 4–3, Germany, USA 3–4, Korea, Russia 2–5, Italy 1–6, Norway 0–7.

===== Figure skating =====
- World Championships in Los Angeles, United States:
  - Compulsory Dance: (1) Oksana Domnina / Maxim Shabalin (Russia) 40.77 (2) Tanith Belbin / Benjamin Agosto (United States) 39.65 (3) Tessa Virtue / Scott Moir (Canada) 39.37
  - Pairs Short Program: (1) Aliona Savchenko / Robin Szolkowy (Germany) 72.30 (2) Yuko Kavaguti / Alexander Smirnov (Russia) 68.94 (3) Dan Zhang / Hao Zhang (China) 67.42

=== March 23, 2009 (Monday) ===
==== Baseball ====
- World Baseball Classic:
  - Final in Los Angeles, California, United States:
    - South Korea 3–5 **Japan** (10 innings)
      - Ichiro Suzuki hits a two-run single in the top of the 10th, and Yu Darvish closes the door on South Korea as Japan successfully defends its 2006 title. Japan's Daisuke Matsuzaka is named MVP for the second time in two Classics.

==== Basketball ====
- NCAA Division I Women's Tournament:
  - Second round (seeding in parentheses):
    - Trenton region:
      - (6) Arizona State 63, (3) Florida State 58
      - (4) California 99, (5) Virginia 73
    - Berkeley region:
      - (3) Ohio State 64, (11) Mississippi State 58
      - (2) Stanford 77, (10) San Diego State 49
    - Raleigh region:
      - (4) Vanderbilt 74, (5) Kansas State 61
    - Oklahoma City region:
      - (6) Purdue 85, (3) North Carolina 70
      - (7) Rutgers 80, (2) Auburn 52
      - (4) Pittsburgh 65, (12) Gonzaga 60

==== Winter sports ====
===== Curling =====
- World Women's Championship in Gangneung, South Korea:
  - Draw 6:
    - Switzerland 7–6 South Korea
    - Germany 8–1 Italy
    - Norway 7–8 Scotland (11 ends)
    - Denmark 7–6 Sweden (11 ends)
  - Draw 7:
    - Italy 9–6 United States
    - South Korea 6–7 China
    - Sweden 9–3 Russia
    - Scotland 3–9 Canada
  - Draw 8:
    - Canada 8–5 Norway
    - Russia 4–7 Denmark
    - China 8–7 Switzerland
    - United States 7–6 Germany
  - Standings after 8 draws: Canada, Denmark 5–0, China, Sweden 4–1, Scotland, Switzerland 3–2, Germany 2–3, Italy, South Korea, Russia, USA 1–4, Norway 0–5.

=== March 22, 2009 (Sunday) ===
==== Athletics ====
- Tokyo Marathon:
  - Men: (1) Salim Kipsang (Kenya) 2hr 10min 27sec (2) Kazuhiro Maeda (Japan) 2:11:01 (3) Kensuke Takahashi (Japan) 2:11:25
  - Women: (1) Mizuho Nasukawa (Japan) 2:25:38 (2) Yukari Sahaku (Japan) 2:28:55 (3) Reiko Tosa (Japan) 2:29:19

==== Auto racing ====
- Sprint Cup Series:
  - Food City 500 in Bristol, Tennessee
    - (1) Kyle Busch (Nevada) (2) Denny Hamlin (Virginia) (3) Jimmie Johnson (California)
      - Drivers' standings (after 5 races): (1) Jeff Gordon (California) 794 points (2) Kurt Busch (Nevada) −76 (3) Clint Bowyer (Kansas) −79
- V8 Supercars:
  - Clipsal 500 in Adelaide
    - Round 2: (1) Jamie Whincup (Australia) (2) Will Davison (Australia) (3) Garth Tander (Australia)
    - Standings (after 2 of 26 races): (1) Whincup 300 (2) W. Davison 267 (3) Lee Holdsworth 249
- WTCC:
  - HSBC Race of Mexico in Puebla, Mexico:
    - Round 3: (1) Rickard Rydell (Sweden) (2) Augusto Farfus (Brazil) (3) Andy Priaulx (United Kingdom)
    - Round 4: (1) Yvan Muller (France) (2) Priaulx (3) Rydell
      - Drivers' standings (after 4 of 24 events): (1) Muller & Rydell 30 points (3) Farfus 20

==== Baseball ====
- World Baseball Classic:
  - Semifinals in Los Angeles, California, United States:
    - United States 4–9 Japan

==== Basketball ====
- NCAA Division I Men's Tournament:
  - Second round (seeding in parentheses):
    - Midwest region:
      - (1) Louisville 79, (9) Siena 72 in Dayton, Ohio
      - (12) Arizona 71, (13) Cleveland State 57 in Miami, Florida
      - (3) Kansas 60, (11) Dayton 43 in Minneapolis, Minnesota
      - (2) Michigan State 74, (10) USC 69 in Minneapolis, Minnesota
    - West region:
      - (3) Missouri 83, (6) Marquette 79 in Boise, Idaho
    - East region:
      - (1) Pittsburgh 84, (8) Oklahoma State 76 in Dayton, Ohio
      - (4) Xavier 60, (5) Wisconsin 49 in Boise, Idaho
    - South region:
      - (3) Syracuse 78, (6) Arizona State 67 in Miami, Florida
- NCAA Division I Women's Tournament:
  - First round (seeding in parentheses):
    - Trenton Region:
      - (1) Connecticut 104, (16) Vermont 65
      - (8) Florida 70, (9) Temple 57
      - (10) Minnesota 79, (7) Notre Dame 71
      - (2) Texas A&M 80, (15) Evansville 45
    - Berkeley Region:
      - (1) Duke 83, (16) Austin Peay 42
      - (9) Michigan State 60, (8) Middle Tennessee 59
      - (4) Iowa State 85, (13) East Tennessee State 53
      - (12) Ball State 71, (5) Tennessee 55
        - The Cardinals inflict on the two-time defending champion Lady Vols their first loss in the first or second round in school history. Tennessee also becomes the first ever defending champion to lose in the first round.
    - Raleigh Region:
      - (1) Maryland 82, (16) Dartmouth 53
      - (9) Utah 60, (8) Villanova 30
      - (6) LSU 69, (11) UW-Green Bay 59
      - (3) Louisville 62, (14) Liberty 42
      - (7) South Dakota State 90, (10) TCU 55
      - (2) Baylor 87, (15) Texas-San Antonio 82 (OT)
    - Oklahoma City Region:
      - (1) Oklahoma 76, (16) Prairie View 47
      - (9) Georgia Tech 76, (8) Iowa 62

==== Cricket ====
- Australia in South Africa:
  - 3rd Test in Cape Town, day 4:
    - Australia 209 & 422 (Mitchell Johnson 123*); South Africa 651. **South Africa win by an innings and 20 runs; Australia win 3-match series 2–1**.
      - South Africa inflict an innings defeat on Australia for the first time since India inflicted an innings & 219 runs defeat in March 1998. However, Australia had already won the series.
- England in West Indies:
  - 2nd ODI in Providence, Guyana:
    - West Indies 264/8 (50 ov); England 243 (48.2 ov). **West Indies win by 21 runs, 5-match series level 1–1**.
- Women's World Cup in Australia:
  - Final:
    - New Zealand 166 (47.2 ov); England 167/6 (46.1 ov) in North Sydney. **England win by 4 wickets and wins the title for the third time**. Claire Taylor was named player of the tournament.

==== Golf ====
- PGA Tour:
  - Transitions Championship in Palm Harbor, Florida:
    - Winner: (South Africa) Retief Goosen 276 (−8)
- European Tour:
  - Madeira Island Open in Madeira, Portugal:
    - Winner: (Argentina) Estanislao Goya 278 (−6)
- LPGA Tour:
  - MasterCard Classic in Mexico City, Mexico:
    - Winner: (United States) Pat Hurst 206 (−10)

==== Ice hockey ====
- NHL:
  - The Boston Bruins clinch the Northeast Division title and the first playoff berth in the Eastern Conference with 4–1 win over the New Jersey Devils.

==== Tennis ====
- ATP Tour and WTA Tour:
  - BNP Paribas Open in Indian Wells, California, United States:
    - Men's final: (Spain) **Rafael Nadal** def. (United Kingdom) Andy Murray 6–1, 6–2
    - Women's final: (Russia) **Vera Zvonareva** def. (Serbia) Ana Ivanovic, 7–6(5), 6–2

==== Winter sports ====
===== Biathlon =====
- World Cup 8 in Trondheim, Norway:
  - 15 km mass start men: (1) Ole Einar Bjørndalen (Norway) 41mins 12.9secs (0 penalties) (2) Simon Eder (Austria) at 39.1 (1) (3) Emil Hegle Svendsen (Norway) 53.4 (2)
    - Overall World Cup standings (after 23 of the 26 races): (1) Bjørndalen 924 points (2) Tomasz Sikora (Poland) 853 (3) Maxim Tchoudov (Russia) 737
    - Mass start standings (after 4 of 5 races): (1) Bjørndalen 191 points (2) Christoph Sumann (Austria) 175 (3) Dominik Landertinger (Austria) 154
  - 12.5 km mass start women: (1) Tora Berger (Norway) 39:29.7 (1) (2) Simone Hauswald (Germany) 39:30.7 (2) (3) Sandrine Bailly (France) 39:31.8 (1)
    - Overall World Cup standings (after 23 of the 26 races): (1) Helena Jonsson (Sweden) 894 points (2) Kati Wilhelm (Germany) 872 (3) Berger 800
    - Mass start standings (after 4 of 5 races): (1) Jonsson 185 points (2) Wilhelm 159 (3) Olga Zaitseva (Russia) 154

===== Cross-country skiing =====
- World Cup in Falun, Sweden:
  - 15 km freestyle handicap men: (1) Dario Cologna (Switzerland) 1:40:45.3 (2) Vincent Vittoz (France) at 41.3 (3) Alexander Legkov (Russia) 1:05.4
    - Final overall World Cup rankings: (1) Cologna 1344 points (2) Petter Northug (Norway) 1217 (3) Ola Vigen Hattestad (Norway) 792
  - 10 km freestyle handicap women: (1) Justyna Kowalczyk (Poland) 1:06:06.8 (2) Therese Johaug (Norway) at 20.0 (3) Charlotte Kalla (Sweden) 23.4
    - Final overall World Cup rankings: (1) Kowalczyk 1810 points (2) Petra Majdič (Slovenia) 1710 (3) Aino-Kaisa Saarinen (Finland) 1463

===== Curling =====
- World Women's Championship in Gangneung, South Korea:
  - Draw 3:
    - Germany 5–3 Norway
    - Switzerland 8–9 Denmark
  - Draw 4:
    - China 9–3 Russia
    - Sweden 8–5 Scotland
    - Italy 4–6 South Korea
    - Canada 10–3 United States
  - Draw 5:
    - Denmark 7–6 Germany
    - Russia 5–8 Canada
    - United States 4–8 China
    - Norway 6–8 Switzerland
  - Standings after draw 5: Canada, Denmark, Sweden 3–0, China, Scotland, Switzerland 2–1, Germany, Korea, Russia 1–2, Italy, Norway, USA 0–3

===== Ski jumping =====
- World Cup in Planica, Slovenia:
  - HS215: (1) Harri Olli 424.6 points (211.0m, 219.5m) (2) Adam Małysz (Poland) 412.4 (210.0m, 209.5m) (3) Simon Ammann (Switzerland) 409.6 (210.0m, 208.0m) & Robert Kranjec (Slovenia) 409.6 (205.5m, 212.5m)
    - Final World Cup Overall standings: (1) Gregor Schlierenzauer (Austria) 2083 points (2) Ammann 1776 (3) Wolfgang Loitzl (Austria) 1396
    - Final World Cup Ski Flying standings: (1) Schlierenzauer 477 points (2) Olli 372 points (3) Ammann 370
    - Final Nations Cup standings: (1) Austria 7331 points (2) Finland 4270 (3) Norway 4175

===== Snowboarding =====
- World Cup in Valmalenco, Italy:
  - Parallel GS men: (1) Jasey-Jay Anderson (Canada) (2) Benjamin Karl (Austria) (3) Siegfried Grabner (Austria)
    - Grabner wins the overall and parallel World Cup titles.
  - Parallel GS women: (1) Amelie Kober (Germany) (2) Caroline Calve (Canada) (3) Doris Guenther (Austria)
    - Guenther wins the overall World Cup title, Kober wins the parallel title.

=== March 21, 2009 (Saturday) ===
==== Auto racing ====
- Nationwide Series:
  - Scotts Turf Builder 300 in Bristol, Tennessee:
    - (1) Kevin Harvick (California) (2) Carl Edwards (Missouri) (3) Clint Bowyer (Kansas)
- V8 Supercars:
  - Clipsal 500 in Adelaide
    - Round 1: (1) Jamie Whincup (Australia) (2) Lee Holdsworth (Australia) (3) Will Davison (Australia)
- American Le Mans Series:
  - 12 Hours of Sebring in Sebring, Florida, United States
    - (1) Allan McNish (United Kingdom) , Rinaldo Capello (Italy) & Tom Kristensen (Denmark) (2) Franck Montagny (France) , Stéphane Sarrazin (France) & Sébastien Bourdais (France) (3) Mike Rockenfeller (Germany) , Lucas Luhr (Germany) & Marco Werner (Germany)

==== Baseball ====
- World Baseball Classic:
  - Semifinals in Los Angeles, California, United States:
    - South Korea 10–2 Venezuela

==== Basketball ====
- NCAA Division I Men's Tournament:
  - Second round (seeding in parentheses):
    - West region:
      - (1) Connecticut 92, (9) Texas A&M 66
      - (5) Purdue 76, (4) Washington 74
      - (2) Memphis 89, (10) Maryland 70
    - East region:
      - (3) Villanova 89, (6) UCLA 69
      - (2) Duke 74, (7) Texas 69
    - South region:
      - (1) North Carolina 84, (8) LSU 70
      - (4) Gonzaga 83, (12) Western Kentucky 81
      - (2) Oklahoma 73, (10) Michigan 63
- NCAA Division I Women's Tournament:
  - First round (seeding in parentheses):
    - Trenton region:
      - (6) Arizona State 58, (11) Georgia 47
      - (3) Florida State 83, (14) North Carolina A&T 71
      - (4) California 70, (13) Fresno State 47
      - (5) Virginia 68, (12) Marist 61
    - Berkeley region:
      - (11) Mississippi State 71, (6) Texas 63
      - (3) Ohio State 77, (14) Sacred Heart 63
      - (10) San Diego State 76, (7) DePaul 70
      - (2) Stanford 74, (15) UC Santa Barbara 39
    - Raleigh region:
      - (4) Vanderbilt 73, (13) Western Carolina 44
      - (5) Kansas State 68, (12) Drexel 44
    - Oklahoma City region:
      - (3) North Carolina 85, (14) UCF 80
      - (6) Purdue 65, (11) Charlotte 52
      - (2) Auburn 85, (15) Lehigh 49
      - (7) Rutgers 56, (10) Virginia Commonwealth 49
      - (4) Pittsburgh 64, (13) Montana 35
      - (12) Gonzaga 74, (5) Xavier 59

==== Cricket ====
- India in New Zealand:
  - 1st Test in Hamilton, day 4:
    - New Zealand 279 and 279; India 520 and 39/0. **India win by 10 wickets, lead 3-match series 1–0**.
- Australia in South Africa:
  - 3rd Test in Cape Town, day 3:
    - Australia 209 and 102/2; South Africa 651 (Jacques Kallis 102, AB de Villiers 163). Australia trail by 340 runs with 8 wickets remaining.
- Women's World Cup in Australia:
  - 3rd place play-off:
    - Australia 142 (44.4/46 ov); India 145/7 (43.5/46 ov) in Bankstown. **India win by 3 wickets (D/L method)**.
  - 5th place play-off:
    - Pakistan 131 (46.3 ov); West Indies 135/7 (46.3 ov) in Drummoyne. **West Indies win by 3 wickets**.

==== Rugby union ====
- Six Nations Championship, week 5:
  - Italy 8–50 France in Rome
    - France win their third consecutive Giuseppe Garibaldi Trophy.
  - England 26–12 Scotland in London
    - England win the 121st Calcutta Cup.
  - Wales 15–17 Ireland in Cardiff
    - Ronan O'Gara scores a drop goal with three minutes remaining to give Ireland their first Six Nations title since 1985, and also their first Grand Slam since 1948 and fourth Triple Crown in the last six years.

==== Winter sports ====
===== Biathlon =====
- World Cup 8 in Trondheim, Norway:
  - 12.5 km pursuit men: (1) Ole Einar Bjørndalen (Norway) 33min 18.3sec (2) (2) Simon Eder (Austria) at 25.1sec (1) (3) Tomasz Sikora (Poland) 25.3 (2)
    - Overall World Cup standings (after 22 of 26 races): (1) Bjørndalen 864 points (2) Sikora 828 (3) Maxim Tchoudov (Russia) 709
    - World Cup pursuit standings (after 6 of 7 events): (1) Bjørndalen 288 points (2) Sikora 276 (3) Emil Hegle Svendsen (Norway) 248
  - 10 km pursuit women: (1) Andrea Henkel (Germany) 30:08.8 0 penalty (10th) (2) Olga Zaitseva (Russia) at 12.9 1 (1st) (3) Marie-Laure Brunet (France) 28.3 1 (6th)
    - Overall World Cup standings (after 22 of 26 races): (1) Helena Jonsson (Sweden) 865 points (2) Wilhelm 832 (3) Magdalena Neuner (Germany) 762
    - World Cup pursuit standings (after 6 of 7 races): (1) Wilhelm 272 points (2) Martina Beck (Germany) 235 (3) Tora Berger (Norway) 234

===== Cross-country skiing =====
- World Cup in Falun, Sweden:
  - 20 km pursuit men: (1) Dario Cologna (Switzerland) 54:59.5 (2) Marcus Hellner (Sweden) 55:01.2 (3) Tobias Angerer (Germany) 55:01.9
  - 10 km pursuit women: (1) Riitta-Liisa Roponen (Finland) 29mins 24.7secs (2) Therese Johaug (Norway) at 1.3 (3) Justyna Kowalczyk (Poland) 4.2

===== Curling =====
- World Women's Championship in Gangneung, South Korea:
  - Draw 1:
    - Norway 2–10 Denmark
    - Italy 2–7 Sweden
    - South Korea 4–6 Scotland
    - Switzerland 7–5 Germany
  - Draw 2:
    - Scotland 11–2 Italy
    - Canada 11–5 China
    - Russia 7–5 United States
    - South Korea 8–10 Sweden (12 ends)
  - Standings after 2 draws: Scotland, Sweden 2–0, Canada, Denmark, Russia, Switzerland 1–0, China, Germany, Norway, USA 0–1, Italy, Korea 0–2.

===== Ski jumping =====
- World Cup in Planica, Slovenia:
  - Team HS215: (1) Norway 793.4 points (Tom Hilde, Johan Remen Evensen, Anders Jacobsen, Anders Bardal) (2) Poland 761.9 (Kamil Stoch, Lukasz Rutkowski, Stefan Hula, Adam Małysz) (3) Russia 734.6 (Denis Kornilov, Pavel Karelin, Ilja Roslakov, Dimitry Vassiliev)
    - One-jump only because of bad weather

===== Snowboarding =====
- World Cup in Valmalenco, Italy:
  - Halfpipe men: (1) Gary Zebrowski (France) (2) Nathan Johnstone (Australia) (3) Zeng Xiaoye (China)
  - Halfpipe women: (1) Liu Jiayu (China) (2) Holly Crawford (Australia) (3) Sarah Conrad (Canada)

=== March 20, 2009 (Friday) ===
==== Basketball ====
- NCAA Division I Men's Tournament:
  - First round (seeding in parentheses):
    - Midwest region:
      - (1) Louisville 74, (16) Morehead State 54
      - (9) Siena 74, (8) Ohio State 72 (2 OT)
      - (12) Arizona 84, (5) Utah 71
      - (13) Cleveland State 84, (4) Wake Forest 69
      - (3) Kansas 84, (14) North Dakota State 74
      - (11) Dayton 68, (6) West Virginia 60
      - (10) USC 72, (7) Boston College 55
      - (2) Michigan State 77, (15) Robert Morris 62
    - West region:
      - (6) Marquette 58, (11) Utah State 57
      - (3) Missouri 78, (14) Cornell 59
    - East region:
      - (8) Oklahoma State 77, (9) Tennessee 75
      - (1) Pittsburgh 72, (16) East Tennessee State 62
      - (4) Xavier 77, (13) Portland State 59
      - (12) Wisconsin 61, (5) Florida State 59 (OT)
    - South region:
      - (3) Syracuse 59, (14) Stephen F. Austin 44
      - (6) Arizona State 66, (11) Temple 57

==== Cricket ====
- India in New Zealand:
  - 1st Test in Hamilton, day 3:
    - New Zealand 279 and 75/3; India 520 (Sachin Tendulkar 160). New Zealand trail by 166 runs with 7 wickets remaining.
- Australia in South Africa:
  - 3rd Test in Cape Town, day 2:
    - Australia 209; South Africa 404/3 (Ashwell Prince 150, Jacques Kallis 102*). South Africa lead by 195 runs with 7 wickets remaining in the 1st innings.
- England in West Indies:
  - 1st ODI in Providence, Guyana:
    - England 270/7 (50 ov); West Indies 244/7 (46.2 ov). **England win by 1 run (D/L method), lead 5-match series 1–0**.
      - After losing their seventh wicket, the West Indies batsmen are offered the light and take it, believing that they would win the match. However, this turned out to be wrong as the West Indies required a score of 246 after 46.2 overs under the Duckworth–Lewis method in order to win the match.

==== Winter sports ====
===== Cross-country skiing =====
- World Cup in Falun, Sweden:
  - 3.3 km freestyle sprint men: (1) Axel Teichmann (Germany) 8min 33.1sec (2) Dario Cologna (Switzerland) at 0.2sec (3) Martin Koukal (Czech Republic) 5.3
  - 2.5 km freestyle sprint women: (1) Claudia Nystad (Germany) 7min 12.5sec (2) Charlotte Kall (Sweden) at 2.7sec (3) Justyna Kowalczyk (Poland) 3.0

===== Freestyle skiing =====
- World Cup in La Plagne, France:
  - Skicross men:
  - Skicross women:

===== Ski jumping =====
- World Cup in Planica, Slovenia:
  - HS215: (1) Gregor Schlierenzauer (Austria) 196.1pts (203.0m), (2) Adam Małysz (Poland) 195.0 (202.5), (3) Dimitry Vassiliev (Russia) 193.6 (200.5)
    - The second round of the competition was cancelled due to unstable wind conditions.
    - Schlierenzauer win his 13th competition of the season, which is a new single-season record.
    - Overall World Cup standings (after 26 of 27 events): (1) Schlierenzauer 2038pts, (2) Simon Ammann (Switzerland) 1716, (3) Wolfgang Loitzl (Austria) 1378

===== Snowboarding =====
- World Cup in Valmalenco, Italy:
  - Snowboardcross men: (1) Michal Novotny (Czech Republic) (2) Nick Baumgartner (United States) (3) David Speiser (Germany)
  - Snowboardcross women: (1) Maëlle Ricker (Canada) (2) Dominique Maltais (Canada) (3) Zoe Gillings (United Kingdom)

=== March 19, 2009 (Thursday) ===
==== Baseball ====
- World Baseball Classic:
  - Pool 1 in: San Diego, California, United States:
    - Japan 6–2 South Korea
      - The semifinals are now set, with Japan facing Team USA and South Korea facing Venezuela.

==== Basketball ====
- NCAA Division I Men's Tournament:
  - First round (seeding in parentheses):
    - West region:
      - (9) Texas A&M 79, (8) Brigham Young 66
      - (1) Connecticut 103, (16) Chattanooga 47
      - (5) Purdue 61, (12) Northern Iowa 56
      - (4) Washington 71, (13) Mississippi State 58
      - (2) Memphis 81, (15) Cal State Northridge 70
      - (10) Maryland 84, (7) California 71
    - East region:
      - (3) Villanova 80, (14) American 67
      - (6) UCLA 65, (11) Virginia Commonwealth 64
      - (7) Texas 76, (10) Minnesota 62
      - (2) Duke 86, (15) Binghamton 62
    - South region:
      - (8) LSU 75, (9) Butler 71
      - (1) North Carolina 101, (16) Radford 58
      - (4) Gonzaga 77, (13) Akron 64
      - (12) Western Kentucky 76, (5) Illinois 72
      - (10) Michigan 62, (7) Clemson 59
      - (2) Oklahoma 82, (15) Morgan State 54

==== Cricket ====
- India in New Zealand:
  - 1st Test in Hamilton, day 2:
    - New Zealand 279; India 278/4. India trail by 1 run with 6 wickets remaining in the 1st innings.
- Australia in South Africa:
  - 3rd Test in Cape Town, day 1:
    - Australia 209; South Africa 57/0. South Africa trail by 152 runs with 10 wickets remaining in the 1st innings.
- Women's World Cup in Australia:
  - Super Six's:
    - England 161 (49.3 overs); Australia 163/2 (33.5 overs) in North Sydney. **Australia win by 8 wickets**.
    - West Indies 84 (44.4 overs); India 86/2 (17.5 overs) in Bankstown. **India win by 8 wickets**.
    - New Zealand 373/7 (50.0 overs); Pakistan 150 (48.1 overs) in Drummoyne. **New Zealand win by 223 runs**.
      - England and New Zealand will play in the final on Sunday. Australia and India will play for 3rd place.

==== Football (soccer) ====
- UEFA Cup round of 16, second leg:
  - Metalist Kharkiv (Ukraine) 3–2 (Ukraine) **Dynamo Kyiv**
    - 3–3 on aggregate, Kyiv win by away goals rule.
  - **Shakhtar Donetsk** (Ukraine) 2–0 (Russia) CSKA Moscow
    - Donetsk win 2–1 on aggregate.
  - Zenit St. Petersburg (Russia) 1–0 (Italy) **Udinese**
    - Udinese win 2–1 on aggregate.
  - Galatasaray (Turkey) 2–3 (Germany) **Hamburg**
    - Hamburg win 4–3 on aggregate.
  - Aalborg (Denmark) 2–0 (England) **Manchester City**
    - 2–2 on aggregate, Manchester City win 4–3 in penalty shootout.
  - Braga (Portugal) 0–1 (France) **Paris Saint-Germain**
    - PSG win 1–0 on aggregate.
- Copa Libertadores group stage:
  - Group 3:
    - Nacional (Uruguay) 3–0 (Argentina) River Plate
  - Group 5:
    - Estudiantes (Argentina) 4–0 (Ecuador) Deportivo Quito
- 2009 Major League Soccer season
  - Seattle Sounders FC (United States) 3-0 (United States) New York Red Bulls
    - Seattle win 3–0.

==== Winter sports ====
===== Biathlon =====
- World Cup 8 in Trondheim, Norway:
  - Men's 10 km sprint (penalty laps in brackets): (1) Michael Greis (Germany) 26:11.3 (0+0) (2) Ole Einar Bjørndalen (Norway) 26:29.6 (1+0) (3) Simon Eder (Austria) 26:43.1 (0+0)
    - Overall World Cup standings (after 21 of 26 rounds): (1) Bjørndalen 804 points (2) Tomasz Sikora (Poland) 780 (3) Maxim Tchoudov (Russia) 692
    - World Cup sprint standings (after nine of 10 rounds): (1) Sikora 337 points (2) Bjørndalen 318 (3) Alexander Os (Norway) 290
  - Women's 7.5 km sprint (penalty laps in brackets): (1) Olga Zaitseva (Russia) 22min 56.9sec (0), (2) Helena Jonsson (Sweden) at 5.5sec (0), (3) Sylvie Becaert (France) 11.1 (1)
    - Overall World Cup standings (after 21 of 26 rounds): (1) Jonsson 834 pts, (2) Kati Wilhelm (Germany) 792, (3) Magdalena Neuner (Germany) 739
    - World Cup sprint standings (after nine of 10 rounds): (1) Jonsson 362 pts, (2) Neuner 331, (3) Tora Berger (Norway) 326

===== Freestyle skiing =====
- World Cup in La Plagne, France:
  - Half-pipe men:
  - Half-pipe women:

=== March 18, 2009 (Wednesday) ===
==== Baseball ====
- World Baseball Classic (teams in **bold** advance to the semifinals, team in italics eliminated):
  - Pool 1 in: San Diego, California, United States:
    - **Japan** 5–0 Cuba
      - In an elimination match, Japan defeats their 2006 final opponent for the second time in this pool, and will now face South Korea for semifinal seeding.
  - Pool 2 in Miami, Florida, United States:
    - **Venezuela** 10–6 **United States**
      - Venezuela wins Pool 2 and will play the loser of Korea-Japan game in the semifinal.

==== Basketball ====
- NBA:
  - The Boston Celtics clinch the Atlantic Division title and at least a #4 seed in the playoff with a 112–108 overtime win over the Miami Heat. The Celtics trail Cleveland Cavaliers by 4 games in the race for the Eastern Conference top seed.

==== Cricket ====
- India in New Zealand:
  - 1st Test in Hamilton, day 1:
    - New Zealand 279 (Jesse Ryder 102, Daniel Vettori 118); India 29/0. India trail by 250 runs with 10 wickets remaining in the 1st innings.

==== Football (soccer) ====
- UEFA Cup round of 16, second leg:
  - Saint-Étienne (France) 2–2 (Germany) **Werder Bremen**
    - Bremen win 3–2 on aggregate.
  - Ajax (Netherlands) 2–2(AET) (France) **Marseille**
    - Marseille win 4–3 on aggregate.
- Copa Libertadores group stage:
  - Group 2:
    - Guaraní (Paraguay) 1–3 (Argentina) Boca Juniors
  - Group 4:
    - Defensor Sporting (Uruguay) 0–1 (Brazil) São Paulo
  - Group 5:
    - Cruzeiro (Brazil) 2–0 (Bolivia) Universitario de Sucre
  - Group 7:
    - Boyacá Chicó (Colombia) 3–0 Universidad de Chile
  - Group 8:
    - San Lorenzo (Argentina) 0–1 (Paraguay) Libertad
    - San Luis (Mexico) 2–2 (Peru) Universitario
      - Libertad advance to the last-16 round.
- CONCACAF Champions League semifinals, first leg:
  - Santos Laguna (Mexico) 2–1 (Mexico) Atlante
- AFC Champions League group stage, matchday 2:
  - Group C:
    - Esteghlal (Iran) 1–1 (United Arab Emirates) Al-Jazira
    - Umm-Salal (Qatar) 1–3 (Saudi Arabia) Al-Ittihad
  - Group D:
    - Al-Shabab Al-Arabi (United Arab Emirates) 2–0 (Uzbekistan) Bunyodkor
    - Al-Ettifaq (Saudi Arabia) 2–1 (Iran) Sepahan
  - Group G:
    - Kashima Antlers (Japan) 2–0 (China) Shanghai Shenhua
    - Singapore Armed Forces 0–2 (South Korea) Suwon Samsung Bluewings
  - Group H:
    - Pohang Steelers (South Korea) 1–1 (Japan) Kawasaki Frontale
    - Tianjin Teda (China) 2–2 (Australia) Central Coast Mariners

==== Winter sports ====
===== Cross-country skiing =====
- World Cup in Stockholm, Sweden:
  - Sprint classic men: (1) Johan Kjoestad (Norway) (2) John Kristian Dahl (Norway) (3) Eldar Roenning (Norway)
  - Sprint classic women: (1) Petra Majdič (Slovenia) (2) Aino-Kaisa Saarinen (Finland) (3) Anna Olsson (Sweden)

===== Freestyle skiing =====
- World Cup in La Plagne, France:
  - Dual moguls men:
  - Dual moguls women:

=== March 17, 2009 (Tuesday) ===
==== American football ====
- NFL news:
  - President Barack Obama has nominated Pittsburgh Steelers owner Dan Rooney to be the next U.S. Ambassador to Ireland. (AP/ESPN)

==== Baseball ====
- World Baseball Classic (teams in **bold** advance to the semifinals, team in italics is eliminated):
  - Pool 1 in: San Diego, California, United States:
    - Japan 1–4 **South Korea**
      - South Korea scores 3 runs in the first inning and cruises into the semifinals. Japan now faces Cuba, with the winner advancing to the semifinals and the loser going home.
  - Pool 2 in Miami, Florida, United States:
    - Puerto Rico 5–6 **United States**
      - David Wright hits a two-RBI single in the bottom of the ninth to put the US in the semifinals.

==== Basketball ====
- NCAA Division I Men's Tournament:
  - Opening round game in Dayton, Ohio: Morehead State 58, Alabama State 43

==== Cricket ====
- Women's World Cup in Australia:
  - Super Six's:
    - India 207 (49.4 overs); New Zealand 210/5 (47.4 overs) in North Sydney. **New Zealand win by 5 wickets**
    - England 236/8 (50.0 overs); West Indies 90 (38.2 overs) in Drummoyne. **England win by 146 runs**
      - England (8 pts from 4 matches) advance to the final. New Zealand (6 pts), Australia or India (both 4 pts) could be their opponent.

==== Football (soccer) ====
- Copa Libertadores group stage:
  - Group 2:
    - Deportivo Cuenca (Ecuador) 3–1 (Venezuela) Deportivo Táchira
  - Group 6:
    - Lanús (Argentina) 1–2 (Chile) Everton
  - Group 4:
    - Independiente Medellín (Colombia) 0–0 (Colombia) América de Cali
- CONCACAF Champions League semifinals, first leg:
  - Puerto Rico Islanders 2–0 (Mexico) Cruz Azul
- AFC Champions League group stage, matchday 2:
  - Group A:
    - Saba Battery (Iran) 0–0 (United Arab Emirates) Al-Ahli
    - Pakhtakor Tashkent (Uzbekistan) 1–1 (Saudi Arabia) Al-Hilal
  - Group B:
    - Al-Shabab (Saudi Arabia) 0–0 (Iran) Persepolis
    - Sharjah (United Arab Emirates) 0–2 (Qatar) Al-Gharafa
  - Group E:
    - Nagoya Grampus (Japan) 0–0 (China) Beijing Guoan
    - Newcastle United Jets (Australia) 2–0 (South Korea) Ulsan Hyundai Horang-i
  - Group F:
    - Seoul (South Korea) 2–4 (Japan) Gamba Osaka
    - Shandong Luneng Taishan (China) 5–0 (Indonesia) Sriwijaya

==== Ice hockey ====
- NHL:
  - The New Jersey Devils' Martin Brodeur takes sole possession of the record for most regular-season NHL wins by a goaltender, collecting his 552nd in a 3–2 Devils victory over the Chicago Blackhawks.
  - The San Jose Sharks secure the Pacific Division title, as their nearest rivals, the Dallas Stars, lose 2–4 to the Vancouver Canucks.

=== March 16, 2009 (Monday) ===
==== Baseball ====
- World Baseball Classic (team in **bold** advances to semifinals, team in italics eliminated):
  - Pool 1 in: San Diego, California, United States:
    - Cuba 7–4 Mexico
      - Cuba eliminates Mexico and will play the Japan–South Korea loser for a semifinal place.
  - Pool 2 in Miami, Florida, United States:
    - **Venezuela** 2–0 Puerto Rico
      - Venezuela advances to the semifinals as Félix Hernández and relievers combine on a shutout.

==== Basketball ====
- Women's NCAA tournament #1 seeds:
  - Trenton Region: Connecticut (overall #1 seed)
  - Berkeley Region: Duke
  - Raleigh Region: Maryland
  - Oklahoma City Region: Oklahoma

==== Cricket ====
- Women's World Cup in Australia:
  - Super Six's:
    - Australia 229/6 (50 ov); Pakistan 122 (45.1 ov) in Bankstown. **Australia win by 107 runs**.
      - Australia gets level with New Zealand and India in second place on 4 points, while Pakistan is out of contention for the final.

=== March 15, 2009 (Sunday) ===
==== Auto racing ====
- World Rally Championship:
  - Cyprus Rally:
    - (1) Sébastien Loeb (France) (2) Mikko Hirvonen (Finland) (3) Petter Solberg (Norway)
      - Drivers overall standings: (1) Loeb 30 pts (2) Hirvonen 22 (3) Dani Sordo (Spain) 17

==== Badminton ====
- BWF Super Series:
  - Swiss Open Super Series in Basel:
    - Men's singles: (Malaysia) Lee Chong Wei
    - Women's singles: (China) Wang Yihan
    - Men's doubles: (Malaysia) Koo Kien Keat & Tan Boon Heong
    - Women's doubles: (China) Du Jing & Yu Yang
    - Mixed doubles: (China) Zheng Bo & Ma Jin

==== Baseball ====
- World Baseball Classic (teams in italics eliminated):
  - Pool 1 in: San Diego, California, United States:
    - Japan 6–0 Cuba
    - Mexico 2–8 South Korea
  - Pool 2 in Miami, Florida, United States:
    - Netherlands 3–9 United States

==== Basketball ====
- US college basketball
  - Men's conference championship games — winners earn bids to the NCAA tournament
    - ACC in Atlanta: Duke 79, Florida State 69
    - Big Ten in Indianapolis: Purdue 65, Ohio State 61
    - SEC in Tampa: Mississippi State 64, Tennessee 61
    - Southland in Katy, Texas: Stephen F. Austin 68, Texas-San Antonio 57
  - Men's NCAA Tournament #1 seeds:
    - Midwest Region: Louisville (overall #1 seed)
    - West Region: Connecticut
    - East Region: Pittsburgh
    - South Region: North Carolina
    - For the first time ever, the same conference (the Big East) produces three #1 seeds.
  - Women's conference championship games — winners earn bids to the NCAA tournament
    - America East in West Hartford, Connecticut: Vermont 74, Boston University 66
    - Big South in High Point, North Carolina: Liberty 51, Gardner–Webb 50
    - Big 12 in Oklahoma City: Baylor 72, Texas A&M 63
    - CAA in Harrisonburg, Virginia: Drexel 64, James Madison 58
    - Horizon League in Green Bay, Wisconsin: UW-Green Bay 65, UW-Milwaukee 41
    - Mid-American in Cleveland: Ball State 55, Bowling Green 51
    - Missouri Valley in St. Charles, Missouri: Evansville 47, Creighton 45
    - NEC in Fairfield, Connecticut: Saint Francis 74. Sacred Heart 66
    - Pac-10 in Los Angeles: Stanford 89, USC 64
- Canadian Interuniversity Sport Final 8 at Ottawa, Ontario:
  - Consolation Final: (5) Ottawa Gee-Gees 83, (7) Concordia Stingers 76
  - Championship final: (1) Carleton Ravens 87, (3) UBC Thunderbirds 77
    - The Ravens win their sixth title in seven years, this time at home. The Ravens will host the Final 8 again next year. Stuart Turnbull was named game MVP in a 22-point outing.

==== Cricket ====
- England in West Indies:
  - Only T20I in Port of Spain, Trinidad:
    - England 121 (19.1/20 ov); West Indies 123/4 (18/20 ov). **West Indies win by 6 wickets**.

==== Football (soccer) ====
- Scottish League Cup Final in Glasgow:
  - Celtic 2–0 (AET) Rangers

==== Golf ====
- World Golf Championships:
  - WGC-CA Championship in Doral, Florida
    - Winner: (United States) Phil Mickelson 269 (−19)
- PGA Tour:
  - Puerto Rico Open in Río Grande, Puerto Rico
    - Winner: (United States) Michael Bradley 274 (−14)

==== Ice hockey ====
- NHL:
  - The Detroit Red Wings and San Jose Sharks are the first two teams to clinch playoff berths, with wins over the Columbus Blue Jackets and Anaheim Ducks respectively.

==== Rugby union ====
- Six Nations Championship, week 4:
  - England 34–10 France in London
    - England jumps out to a 29–0 halftime lead and cruises from there. France's loss ends their championship hopes and means that the title will be decided in next week's Wales–Ireland match in Cardiff.

==== Winter sports ====
===== Alpine skiing =====
- World Cup Final in Åre, Sweden:
  - Team event: (1) Italy (2) Austria (3) Switzerland

===== Biathlon =====
- World Cup 7 in Vancouver, British Columbia, Canada:
  - 4 x 7.5 km relay men: (1) Sweden (Vincent Ekholm, Mattias Nilsson, Fredrik Lindström, Carl Johan Bergman) 1hr 16min 18.6sec (0 penalty laps) (2) France (Vincent Jay, Vincent Defrasne, Martin Fourcade, Simon Fourcade) 6.3sec behind (0) (3) Germany (Simon Schempp, Daniel Böhm, Arnd Peiffer, Michael Rösch) 16.4sec behind (0)
    - Final overall relay standings (after 6 events): (1) Austria 276 points (2) Norway 254, (3) Germany 247

===== Freestyle skiing =====
- World Cup in Meiringen–Hasliberg, Switzerland:
  - Skicross men:
  - Skicross women:

===== Nordic combined =====
- World Cup in Vikersund, Norway:
  - Gundersen HS117/10 km: (1) Bill Demong (United States) 26mins 31.6secs (12th after ski jump) (2) Petter Tande (Norway) at 9.8 (17) (3) Mikko Kokslien (Norway) 10.3 (34)
    - Final World Cup standings: (1) Anssi Koivuranta (Finland) 1461 points (2) Magnus Moan (Norway) 1350 (3) Demong 1060

===== Short track speed skating =====
- World Team Championships in Heerenveen, Netherlands:

===== Ski jumping =====
- Nordic Tournament:
  - World Cup in Vikersund, Norway:
    - HS207: (1) Gregor Schlierenzauer (Austria) 386.4 points (207.5m/192.0m) (2) Simon Ammann (Switzerland) 379.7 (191.0m/202.5m) (3) Dimitry Vassiliev (RUS) 372.2 (184.5m/204.0m)
      - Overall World Cup standings (after 25 of the 27 jumps): (1) Schlierenzauer 1938 points (2) Ammann 1676 (3) Wolfgang Loitzl (Austria) 1356
      - Schlierenzauer secures the World Cup title, Amman will take the silver globe and Loitzl the bronze.

===== Snowboarding =====
- World Cup in La Molina, Spain:
  - Parallel GS men:
  - Parallel GS women:

===== Speed skating =====
- World Single Distances Championships in Richmond, British Columbia, Canada:

=== March 14, 2009 (Saturday) ===
==== Baseball ====
- World Baseball Classic:
  - Pool 2 in Miami, Florida, United States:
    - Netherlands 1–3 Venezuela
    - United States 1–11 Puerto Rico (7 innings, mercy rule)

==== Basketball ====
- US college basketball
  - Men's conference championship games — winners earn bids to the NCAA tournament
    - America East in Vestal, New York: Binghamton 61, UMBC 51
      - The Bearcats book their first-ever trip to "The Big Dance".
    - Atlantic 10 in Atlantic City, New Jersey: Temple 69, Duquesne 64
    - Big East in New York City: Louisville 76, Syracuse 66
    - Big 12 in Oklahoma City: Missouri 73, Baylor 60
    - Big West in Anaheim, California: Cal State Northridge 71, Pacific 65
    - Conference USA in Memphis: Memphis 64, Tulsa 39
      - The Tigers extend their winning streak in C-USA play to 61 and state their case for a #1 seed.
    - MEAC in Winston-Salem, North Carolina: Morgan State 83, Norfolk State 69
    - Mid-American in Cleveland: Akron 65, Buffalo 53
    - Mountain West in Las Vegas: Utah 52, San Diego State 50
    - Pac-10 in Los Angeles: USC 66, Arizona State 63
    - SWAC in Birmingham, Alabama: Alabama State 65, Jackson State 58
    - WAC in Reno, Nevada: Utah State 72, Nevada 62
  - Women's conference championship games — winners earn bids to the NCAA tournament
    - Big Sky in Missoula, Montana: Montana 69, Portland State 62
    - Big West in Anaheim, California: UC Santa Barbara 64, Cal Poly 57
    - MEAC in Winston-Salem, North Carolina: North Carolina A&T 76, Hampton 54
    - Mountain West in Las Vegas: Utah 63, San Diego State 58
    - Southland in Katy, Texas: UTSA 74, Texas–Arlington 63
    - SWAC in Birmingham, Alabama: Prairie View 74, Southern 49
    - WAC in Reno, Nevada: Fresno State 56, Nevada 49
  - In another women's game:
    - Old Dominion's 62–41 loss to Drexel in the semifinals of the CAA tournament ends the Lady Monarchs' NCAA Division I record of 17 consecutive conference tournament titles.
- Canadian Interuniversity Sport Final 8:
  - Consolation round:
    - (7) Concordia Stingers 72, (6) Dalhousie Tigers 61
    - (5) Ottawa Gee-Gees 85, (8) St.FX X-Men 63
  - Semifinals:
    - (3) UBC Thunderbirds 79, (2) Calgary Dinos 74
    - (1) Carleton Ravens 66, (4) Western Ontario Mustangs 65

==== Cricket ====
- India in New Zealand:
  - 5th ODI in Auckland:
    - India 149 (36.3/43 ov); New Zealand 151/2 (23.2/43 ov). **New Zealand win by 8 wickets. India win 5-match series 3–1**.
- Women's World Cup in Australia:
  - Super Six's:
    - India 234/5 (50 ov); Australia 218/7 (50 ov) in North Sydney. **India win by 16 runs**.
    - England 201/5 (50 ov); New Zealand 170 (48.4 ov) in Bankstown. **England win by 31 runs**.
    - West Indies 132/9 (50 ov); Pakistan 134/6 (47.5 ov) in Drummoyne. **Pakistan win by 4 wickets**.
      - Standings after 3 of 5 matches: England 6 points, India & New Zealand 4, Australia & Pakistan 2, West Indies 0.
  - 7th place playoff:
    - Sri Lanka 75 (39 ov); South Africa 76/1 (28.3 ov) in North Sydney. **South Africa win by 9 wickets**.

==== Ice hockey ====
- NHL:
  - New Jersey Devils goaltender Martin Brodeur collects his 551st regular-season NHL win in a 3–1 victory over the Montreal Canadiens, tying the record of Patrick Roy.

==== Motorcycle racing ====
- Superbike World championship:
  - Losail Superbike World Championship round in Doha, Qatar
  - Superbike:
    - Race 1: (1) Ben Spies (United States) (2) Noriyuki Haga (Japan) (3) Max Biaggi (Italy)
    - Race 2: (1) Spies (2) Haga (3) Biaggi
      - Riders' standings (after 2 of 14 events): (1) Haga 85 points (2) Spies 75 (3) Max Neukirchner (Germany) 40
  - Supersport:
    - (1) Eugene Laverty (Republic of Ireland) (2) Andrew Pitt (Australia) (3) Cal Crutchlow (United Kingdom)
      - Riders' standings (after 2 of 14 events): (1) Pitt 40 points (2) Kenan Sofuoğlu (Turkey) 38 (3) Laverty 36

==== Rugby union ====
- Six Nations Championship, week 4:
  - Italy 15–20 Wales in Rome
  - Scotland 15–22 Ireland in Edinburgh
    - Ireland remain on track for a potential Grand Slam. A win or draw against Wales next week in Cardiff will secure them the championship. Wales must win by at least 13 points to win the title. France could also be the winner, if they beat England in London on Sunday and Italy in Rome next week, and Wales beat Ireland.

==== Winter sports ====
===== Alpine skiing =====
- World Cup Final in Åre, Sweden
  - Slalom men: (1) Mario Matt (Austria) 1:45.71 (54.24 + 51.47) (2) Julien Lizeroux (France) 1:45.80 (54.06 + 51.74) (3) Jean-Baptiste Grange (France) 1:45.86 (54.72 + 51.14)
    - Final World Cup overall standings: (1) Aksel Lund Svindal (Norway) 1009 points (2) Benjamin Raich (Austria) 1007 (3) Didier Cuche (Switzerland) 919
    - Final World Cup slalom standings: (1) Grange 541 (2) Ivica Kostelic (Croatia) 454 (3) Lizeroux 419
  - Giant slalom women: (1) Tina Maze (Slovenia) 2:26.41 (1:13.74 + 1:12.67) (2) Tanja Poutiainen (Finland) 2:27.53 (1:14.32 + 1:13.21) (3) Manuela Moelgg (Italy) 2:27.80 (1:14.76 + 1:13.04)
    - Final World Cup overall standings: (1) Lindsey Vonn (United States) 1788 points (2) Maria Riesch (Germany) 1404 (3) Anja Paerson (Sweden) 1059
    - Final World Cup giant slalom standings: (1) Poutiainen 508 (2) Kathrin Zettel (Austria) 501 (3) Maze 368

===== Biathlon =====
- World Cup 7 in Vancouver, British Columbia, Canada:
  - 4 x 6 km relay women: (1) Germany (Kati Wilhelm, Magdalena Neuner, Martina Beck, Andrea Henkel) 1:11:49.8 (2) China (Wang Chunli, Liu Xianying, Dong Xue, Liu Yuan-Yuan) 1:13:05.0 (3) Russia (Svetlana Sleptsova, Anna Boulygina, Olga Medvedtseva, Olga Zaitseva) 1:13:40.3
    - Final World Cup relay standings: (1) Germany 288 points (2) France 242 (3) Ukraine 232

===== Cross-country skiing =====
- World Cup in Trondheim, Norway:
  - 50 km mass start classic men: (1) Sami Jauhojärvi (Finland) 2:02:39.0 (2) Tobias Angerer (Germany) at 21.8 (3) Alex Harvey (Canada) 33.2
    - Overall World Cup standings (after 28 of the 32 races): (1) Petter Northug (Norway) 1042 points (2) Dario Cologna (Switzerland) 1022 (3) Ola Vigen Hattestad (Norway) 760
  - 30 km mass start classic women: (1) Petra Majdič (Slovenia) 1:25:22.2 (2) Justyna Kowalczyk (Poland) at 11.7 (3) Masako Ishida (Japan) 12.0
    - Overall World Cup standings (after 28 out of 32 races): (1) Majdic 1567 points (2) Kowalczyk 1476 (3) Aino-Kaisa Saarinen (Finland) 1365

===== Nordic combined =====
- World Cup in Vikersund, Norway:
  - Gundersen HS117/10 km: (1) Anssi Koivuranta (Finland) (2) Bill Demong (United States) (3) Magnus Moan (Norway)
    - World Cup standings (after 22 of 23 events): (1) Koivuranta 1429 points (2) Moan 1330 (3) Demong 1060
      - Koivuranta need only to finish in 29th place in the last event on Sunday to win the World Cup title.

===== Ski jumping =====
- Nordic Tournament:
  - World Cup in Vikersund, Norway:
    - Team HS207: (1) Austria 1543.5 pts (Martin Koch, Wolfgang Loitzl, Thomas Morgenstern, Gregor Schlierenzauer) (2) Finland 1499.0 (Matti Hautamäki, Kalle Keituri, Ville Larinto, Harri Olli) (3) Norway 1485.0 (Johan Remen Evensen, Bjørn Einar Romøren, Anders Bardal, Anders Jacobsen)

===== Snowboarding =====
- World Cup in La Molina, Spain:
  - Halfpipe men:
  - Halfpipe women:

=== March 13, 2009 (Friday) ===
==== Basketball ====
- NBL Grand Final:
  - Game 5 in Melbourne, Australia:
    - South Dragons 102–81 Melbourne Tigers. **Dragons win series 3–2.**
- NBA:
  - The Cleveland Cavaliers clinch the Central Division title for the first time in 33 years, with 126–123 win in overtime over Sacramento Kings.
- US college basketball:
  - Men's conference championship game — winner earns a bid to the NCAA tournament
    - Patriot League in Washington, D.C.: American 73, Holy Cross 57
- Canadian Interuniversity Sport Final 8 quarterfinals at Ottawa, Ontario: (CIS ranking in parentheses)
  - (4) Western Ontario Mustangs 75, (5) Ottawa Gee-Gees 48
  - (1) Carleton Ravens 94, (8) St. FX X-Men 57
  - (2) Calgary Dinos 76, (7) Concordia Stingers 67
  - (3) UBC Thunderbirds 78, (6) Dalhousie Tigers 54

==== Winter sports ====
===== Alpine skiing =====
- World Cup Final in Åre, Sweden
  - Giant slalom men: (1) Benjamin Raich (Austria) 2:18.95 (1:09.94 + 1:09.01) (2) Ted Ligety (United States) 2:19.08 (1:10.65 + 1:08.43) (3) Didier Cuche (Switzerland) 2:19.66 (1:10.80 + 1:08.86)... 19. Aksel Lund Svindal (Norway) 2:20.96 (1:11.93 + 1:09.03)
    - World Cup overall standings (after 36 of 37 events): (1) Svindal 1009 points (2) Raich 1007 (3) Cuche 919
      - The overall title will be decided on the last race of the season, the slalom on Saturday.
    - World Cup giant slalom standings (after all eight events): (1) Cuche 474 points (champion) (2) Raich 462 (3) Ligety 421
  - Slalom women: (1) Sandrine Aubert (France) 1:49.23 (52.27+56.96) (2) Fanny Chmelar (Germany) 1:49.29 (52.89+56.40) (3) Therese Borssen (Sweden) 1:49.46 (52.77+56.69) & Šárka Záhrobská (Czech Republic) 1:49.46 (51.80+57.66)
    - World Cup overall standings (after 33 of 34 events): (1) Lindsey Vonn (United States) 1788 points (champion) (2) Maria Riesch (Germany) 1404 (3) Anja Pärson (Sweden) 1059
    - World Cup slalom standings (after all nine events): (1) Riesch 625 points (champion) (2) Záhrobská 459 (3) Vonn 440

===== Biathlon =====
- World Cup 7 in Vancouver, British Columbia, Canada:
  - 7.5 km sprint women: (1) Helena Jonsson (Sweden) 19:43.6 (0+0) (2) Magdalena Neuner (Germany) 19:44.3 (0+1) (3) Olga Zaitseva (Russia) 19:45.2 (0+0)
    - Sprint World Cup standings (after 8 of 10 events): (1) Neuner 315 points (2) Jonsson 308 (3) Kati Wilhelm (Germany) 298
    - Overall World Cup standings (after 20 of 26 events): (1) Jonsson 780 points (2) Wilhelm 764 (3) Neuner 723
  - 10 km sprint men: (1) Lars Berger (Norway) 24:06.5 (0) (2) Ole Einar Bjørndalen (Norway) at 14.1 (0) (3) Christoph Sumann (Austria) 39.5 (0)
    - Overall World Cup sprint standings (after eight of 10 rounds): (1) Tomasz Sikora (Poland) 309 points (2) Bjørndalen 264 (3) Emil Hegle Svendsen (Norway) 245
    - Overall World Cup standings (after 20 of 26 rounds): (1) Sikora 752 points (2) Bjørndalen 750 (3) Maxim Tchoudov (Russia) 649

===== Ski jumping =====
- Nordic Tournament:
  - World Cup in Lillehammer, Norway:
    - HS138: (1) Harri Olli (Finland) 288.7pts (135.5/142.0 m), (2) Dimitry Vassiliev (Russia) 275.2 (137.0/133.0), (3) Gregor Schlierenzauer (Austria) 268.9 (128.5/138.0)
      - Overall standings (after 24 of 27 rounds): (1) Schlierenzauer 1838 points, (2) Simon Ammann (Switzerland) 1596, (3) Wolfgang Loitzl (Austria) 1340
      - Schlierenzauer need just 59 more points to secure the World Cup title.

===== Snowboarding =====
- World Cup in La Molina, Spain:
  - Snowboardcross men:
  - Snowboardcross women:

=== March 12, 2009 (Thursday) ===
==== Baseball ====
- World Baseball Classic:
  (teams in **bold** advance to the second round)
  - Pool B in Mexico City, Mexico:
    - **Mexico** 4–16 **Cuba** (7 innings, via mercy rule)

==== Basketball ====
- Euroleague Top 16, week 6 (teams in **bold** advance to the quarterfinals):
  - Group E:
    - **TAU Cerámica** (Spain) 80–88 (Greece) **Olympiacos**
      - Olympiacos defeats TAU in Vitoria-Gasteiz to claim first place in the group.
    - AJ Milano (Italy) 72–96 (Poland) Asseco Prokom Sopot
      - Prokom win their only game in the Top 16 phase.
  - Group F:
    - Maccabi Tel Aviv (Israel) 74–90 (Spain) **Regal FC Barcelona**
      - Barça secures first place in the group with a win in Tel Aviv. Maccabi is 0–6 against Spanish opponents this season.
    - **Real Madrid** (Spain) 83–82 (Germany) ALBA Berlin
      - Real's win at the buzzer leaves ALBA the only winless team in the Top 16 phase.
  - Quarterfinal matchups (first named team has home advantage in best-of-five series):
    - Olympiacos vs. Real
    - Barça vs. TAU
- US college basketball:
  - Big East quarterfinals in New York City: Syracuse 127, Connecticut 117 (6OT)
    - This is the second-longest game in NCAA history, and the longest since the shot clock era.
- NBA:
  - The Los Angeles Lakers clinch the Pacific Division title and the first playoff berth in the Western Conference with a 102–95 win over the San Antonio Spurs.

==== Cricket ====
- Women's World Cup in Australia:
  (teams in **bold** advance to Super Six stage)
  - Group A:
    - **Australia** 211/7 (50 ov); **West Indies** 164/7 (50 ov) in Drummoyne. **Australia win by 47 runs**.
    - **New Zealand** 250/5 (50 ov); South Africa 51 (22.1 ov) in Bowral. **New Zealand win by 199 runs**.
  - Group B:
    - **Pakistan** 78 (39.5 ov); **England** 82/2 (23.1 ov) in North Sydney. **England win by 8 wickets**.
    - **India** 137/7 (50 ov); Sri Lanka 102 (44.2 ov) in Bankstown. **India win by 35 runs**.

==== Football (soccer) ====
- UEFA Cup round of 16, first leg:
  - Werder Bremen (Germany) 1–0 (France) Saint-Étienne
  - CSKA Moscow (Russia) 1–0 (Ukraine) Shakhtar Donetsk
  - Udinese (Italy) 2–0 (Russia) Zenit St. Petersburg
  - Paris Saint-Germain (France) 0–0 (Portugal) Braga
  - Dynamo Kyiv (Ukraine) 1–0 (Ukraine) Metalist Kharkiv
  - Manchester City (England) 2–0 (Denmark) Aalborg
  - Marseille (France) 2–1 (Netherlands) Ajax
  - Hamburg (Germany) 1–1 (Turkey) Galatasaray
- Copa Libertadores group stage:
  - Group 1:
    - Colo-Colo (Chile) 3–0 (Ecuador) LDU Quito
  - Group 3:
    - U. San Martín (Peru) 2–1 (Paraguay) Nacional

==== Winter sports ====
===== Alpine skiing =====
- World Cup Final in Åre, Sweden
  - Super giant slalom men: (1) Werner Heel (Italy) 1min 13.41sec (2) Aksel Lund Svindal (Norway) 1:13.48 (3) Christof Innerhofer (Italy) 1:13.61
    - World Cup overall standings (after 35 of 37 events): (1) Svindal 1009 points (2) Benjamin Raich (Austria) 907 (3) Didier Cuche (Switzerland) 859
    - Final World Cup Super-G standings (after all five events): (1) Svindal (NOR) 292 (winner) (2) Heel 256 (3) Didier Defago (Switzerland) 242
  - Super giant slalom women: (1) Lindsey Vonn (United States) 1min 20.63sec (2) Nadia Fanchini (Italy) 1:20.71 (3) Maria Riesch (Germany) 1:20.87
    - World Cup overall standings (after 32 of 34 events): (1) Vonn 1788 points (winner) (2) Riesch 1359 (3) Anja Paerson (Sweden) 1035
    - Final World Cup Super-G standings (after all seven events): (1) Vonn 461 pts (winner) (2) Fanchini 416 (3) Fabienne Suter (Switzerland) 408

===== Cross-country skiing =====
- World Cup in Trondheim, Norway:
  - Sprint classic men: (1) Ola Vigen Hattestad (Norway) (2) Petter Northug (Norway) (3) Jon Kristian Dahl (Norway)
    - World Cup sprint standings (after 11 of 12 events): (1) Hattestad 760 points (winner) (2) Tor Arne Hetland (Norway) 353 (3) Renato Pasini (Italy) 335
    - Overall World Cup standings (after 27 of 32 events): (1) Dario Cologna (Switzerland) 1006 points (2) Northug 952 (3) Hattestad 760
  - Sprint classic women: (1) Petra Majdič (Slovenia) (2) Alena Prochazkova (Slovakia) (3) Justyna Kowalczyk (Poland)
    - World Cup sprint standings (after 11 of 12 events): (1) Majdic 825 points (winner) (2) Arianna Follis (Italy) 454 (3) Pirjo Muranen (Finland) 421
    - Overall World Cup standings (after 27 of 32 events): (1) Majdic 1462 points (2) Kowalczyk 1351 (3) Aino-Kaisa Saarinen (Finland) 1321

===== Freestyle skiing =====
- World Cup in Grindelwald, Switzerland:
  - Skicross men:
  - Skicross women:

=== March 11, 2009 (Wednesday) ===
==== Baseball ====
- World Baseball Classic:
  (teams in **bold** advance to the second round, teams in italics are eliminated)
  - Pool B in Mexico City, Mexico:
    - **Mexico** 16–1 Australia (6 innings, via mercy rule)
  - Pool C in Toronto, Canada:
    - **Venezuela** 5–3 **United States**
  - Pool D in San Juan, Puerto Rico:
    - **Netherlands** 0–5 **Puerto Rico**

==== Basketball ====
- Euroleague Top 16, week 6 (teams in **bold** advance to the quarterfinals):
  - Group G:
    - **Panathinaikos** (Greece) 103–95 (OT) (Spain) Unicaja Málaga
    - Lottomatica Roma (Italy) 88–72 (Serbia) **Partizan Igokea**
      - Roma's only win in the Top 16 phase hands first place in the group to Panathinaikos, even before their overtime win.
  - Group H:
    - Cibona Zagreb (Croatia) 63–73 (Russia) **CSKA Moscow**
    - Fenerbahçe Ülker (Turkey) 68–73 (Italy) **Montepaschi Siena**
  - Quarterfinal matchups (first named team has home advantage in best-of-five series):
    - Panathinaikos vs. Montepaschi
    - CSKA vs. Partizan
- US college basketball:
  - Men's conference championship games — winners earn bids to the NCAA tournament
    - Big Sky in Ogden, Utah: Portland State 79, Montana State 77
    - Northeast Conference in Moon Township, Pennsylvania: Robert Morris 48, Mount St. Mary's 46
  - Women's conference championship game — winner earns a bid to the NCAA tournament
    - Patriot League in Bethlehem, Pennsylvania: Lehigh 64, Lafayette 56
- NBA:
  - The Orlando Magic become the third team to clinch a playoff berth with their 107–79 win over the Chicago Bulls, combined with the New Jersey Nets' 116–112 loss to the Golden State Warriors.

==== Cricket ====
- India in New Zealand:
  - 4th ODI in Hamilton:
    - New Zealand 270/5 (47/47 ov); India 201/0 (23.3/23.3 ov, Virender Sehwag 125*). **India win by 84 runs (D/L method), lead 5-match series 3–0**.

==== Football (soccer) ====
- UEFA Champions League First knockout round, second leg:
  - **Porto** (Portugal) 0–0 (Spain) Atlético Madrid
    - 2–2 on aggregate. Porto advance on away goals rule.
  - **Barcelona** (Spain) 5–2 (France) Lyon
    - Barcelona win 6–3 on aggregate.
  - Roma (Italy) 1–0 (England) **Arsenal**
    - 1–1 on aggregate. Arsenal win 7–6 on penalties after extra time.
  - **Manchester United** (England) 2–0 (Italy) Internazionale
    - Manchester United win 2–0 on aggregate.
      - All four English teams – Chelsea, Liverpool, Arsenal and Manchester United – are through to the quarterfinals, while all Italian teams are out of the competition.
- Copa Libertadores group stage:
  - Group 2:
    - Deportivo Táchira (Venezuela) 1–0 (Ecuador) Deportivo Cuenca
  - Group 6:
    - Everton (Chile) 1–1 (Argentina) Lanús
    - Guadalajara (Mexico) 1–0 (Venezuela) Caracas
  - Group 7:
    - Boyacá Chicó (Colombia) 0–1 (Brazil) Grêmio
- AFC Champions League group stage, matchday 1:
  - Group A:
    - Al-Hilal (Saudi Arabia) 1–1 (Iran) Saba Battery
  - Group C:
    - Al-Jazira (United Arab Emirates) 0–1 (Qatar) Umm-Salal
    - Al-Ittihad (Saudi Arabia) 2–1 (Iran) Esteghlal
  - Group D:
    - Sepahan (Iran) 2–0 (United Arab Emirates) Al-Shabab
    - Bunyodkor (Uzbekistan) 2–1 (Saudi Arabia) Al-Ettifaq
  - Group G:
    - Suwon Bluewings (South Korea) 4–1 (Japan) Kashima Antlers
    - Shanghai Shenhua (China) 4–1 (Singapore) SAFFC
  - Group H:
    - Central Coast Mariners (Australia) 0–0 (South Korea) Pohang Steelers
    - Kawasaki Frontale (Japan) 1–0 (China) Tianjin Teda

==== Winter sports ====
===== Alpine skiing =====
- World Cup Final in Åre, Sweden
  - Downhill men: (1) Aksel Lund Svindal (Norway) 1min 22.26sec (2) Didier Cuche (Switzerland) 1:22.46 (3) Hans Olsson (Sweden) 1:22.62
    - Overall World Cup standings (after 34 of 37 events) (1) Svindal 929 points (2) Benjamin Raich (Austria) 857 (3) Cuche 843
    - Final World Cup downhill standings (after all nine events): (1) Michael Walchhofer (Austria) 470 pts (champion) (2) Klaus Kroell (Austria) 424 (3) Didier Defago (Switzerland) 363
  - Downhill women: (1) Lindsey Vonn (United States) 1min 42.49sec (2) Maria Riesch (Germany) 1:42.89 (3) Renate Goetschl (Austria) 1:43.75
    - Overall World Cup standings (after 31 of 34 events): (1) Vonn 1688 points (champion) (2) Riesch 1299 (3) Anja Paerson (Sweden) 990
    - Final World Cup Downhill standings (after all seven events): (1) Vonn 502 pts (champion) (2) Andrea Fischbacher (Austria) 326 (3) Riesch 292

===== Biathlon =====
- World Cup 7 in Vancouver, British Columbia, Canada:
  - 15 km individual women: (1) Simone Hauswald (Germany) 42min 44.6sec (0) (2) Olga Zaitseva (Russia) 39.3sec (1) (3) Vita Semerenko (Ukraine) 1:05.8 (1)
    - Final World Cup 15 km standings (after 4 events): (1) Magdalena Neuner (Germany) 129 points (2) Éva Tófalvi (Romania) 123 (3) Tora Berger (Norway) 122
    - Overall World Cup standings (after 19 of 26 events): (1) Kati Wilhelm (Germany) 730 points (2) Helena Jonsson (Sweden) 720 (3) Neuner 669
  - 20 km individual men: (1) Vincent Jay (France) 49min 53.9sec 0 penalty (2) Daniel Boehm (Germany) at 19.0 1 (3) Jeremy Teela (United States) 23.3 1
    - Final World Cup 20 km standings (after all four events): (1) Michael Greis (Germany) 146 points (2) Ivan Tcherezov (Russia) 120 (3) Maxim Tchoudov (Russia) 119
    - World Cup overall standings (after 19 of 26 events): (1) Tomasz Sikora (Poland) 726 points (2) Ole Einar Bjørndalen (Norway) 696 (3) Tchoudov 635

=== March 10, 2009 (Tuesday) ===
==== Baseball ====
- World Baseball Classic:
  (teams in **bold** advance to the second round, teams in italics are eliminated)
  - Pool B in Mexico City, Mexico:
    - **Cuba** 5–4 Australia
      - Cuba advances, Australia plays Mexico to determine the other advancement slot.
  - Pool C in Toronto, Canada:
    - Italy 1–10 **Venezuela**
      - Venezuela advance to the second round, and will play USA on Wednesday to decide the group winner.
  - Pool D in San Juan, Puerto Rico:
    - Dominican Republic 1–2 **Netherlands**, 11 innings
      - The Dutch shock the Dominicans for the second time, scoring two runs off Carlos Mármol in the bottom of the 11th inning.

==== Basketball ====
- US college basketball
  - Men's conference championship games — winners earn bids to the NCAA tournament
    - Horizon League in Indianapolis: Cleveland State 57, Butler 54
    - The Summit in Sioux Falls, South Dakota: North Dakota State 66, Oakland 64
      - The Bison become the first men's team since Southwestern Louisiana, now Louisiana–Lafayette, in 1972 to make the "Big Dance" in their first year of postseason eligibility.
    - Sun Belt in Hot Springs, Arkansas: Western Kentucky 64, South Alabama 56
  - Women's conference championship games — winners earn bids to the NCAA tournament
    - Big East in Hartford, Connecticut: Connecticut 75, Louisville 36
    - The Summit in Sioux Falls, South Dakota: South Dakota State 79, Oakland 69
      - The Jackrabbits make the "Big Dance" in their first season of postseason eligibility.
    - Sun Belt in Hot Springs, Arkansas: Middle Tennessee 74, Arkansas-Little Rock 54
  - Other women's games:
    - Dartmouth claims the Ivy League regular-season crown and the league's automatic bid to the NCAA tournament with a 64–51 home win over Harvard.

==== Cricket ====
- England in West Indies:
  - 5th Test in Port of Spain, Trinidad, day 5:
    - England 546/6d and 237/6d (Kevin Pietersen 102); West Indies 544 and 114/8. **Match drawn. West Indies win series 1–0**.
- Australia in South Africa:
  - 2nd Test in Durban, day 5:
    - Australia 352 and 331/5d; South Africa 138 and 370. **Australia win by 175 runs, lead 3-match series 2–0**
- Women's World Cup in Australia:
  (teams in **bold** advance to the Super Six stage)
  - Group A:
    - **New Zealand** 192/8 (50 ov); West Indies 136/8 (50 ov) in Bankstown. **New Zealand win by 56 runs**.
    - Australia 258/4 (50 ov); South Africa 197 (49.3 ov) in Newcastle. **Australia win by 61 runs**.
  - Group B:
    - India 169 (48.4 ov); **England** 172/1 (38.4 ov) in North Sydney. **England win by 9 wickets**.

==== Football (soccer) ====
- UEFA Champions League First knockout round, second leg:
  - Panathinaikos (Greece) 1–2 (Spain) Villarreal
    - Villarreal win 4–3 on aggregate.
  - Liverpool (England) 4–0 (Spain) Real Madrid
    - Liverpool win 5–0 on aggregate.
  - Bayern (Germany) 7–1 (Portugal) Sporting CP
    - Bayern win 12–1 on aggregate, the biggest aggregate score in Champions League history.
  - Juventus (Italy) 2–2 (England) Chelsea
    - Chelsea win 3–2 on aggregate.
- Copa Libertadores group stage:
  - Group 4:
    - América de Cali (Colombia) 1–1 (Colombia) Independiente Medellín
  - Group 5:
    - Deportivo Quito (Ecuador) 1–0 (Argentina) Estudiantes
  - Group 8:
    - Universitario (Peru) 0–0 (Mexico) San Luis
- AFC Champions League group stage, matchday 1:
  - Group A:
    - Al-Hilal (Saudi Arabia) – (Iran) Saba Battery
      - postponed because of a sandstorm
    - Al-Ahli (United Arab Emirates) 1–2 (Uzbekistan) Pakhtakor
  - Group B:
    - Persepolis (Iran) 3–1 (United Arab Emirates) Sharjah
    - Al-Gharafa (Qatar) 1–3 (Saudi Arabia) Al-Shabab
  - Group E:
    - Ulsan Hyundai (South Korea) 1–3 (Japan) Nagoya Grampus
    - Beijing Guoan (China) 2–0 (Australia) Newcastle Jets
  - Group F:
    - Gamba Osaka (Japan) 3–0 (China) Shandong Luneng
    - Sriwijaya (Indonesia) 2–4 (South Korea) Seoul

==== Winter sports ====
===== Ski jumping =====
- Nordic Tournament:
  - World Cup in Kuopio, Finland:
    - HS127: (1) Takanobu Okabe (Japan) 241.7 points (123.5/123.0m) (2) Simon Ammann (Switzerland) 240.4 (119.5/126.0) (3) Adam Małysz (Poland) 239.3 (119.0/127.0)
      - Okabe wins his first World Cup in 11 years and becomes the oldest ever World Cup winner in ski jumping.
    - World Cup standings (after 23 of 27 events): (1) Gregor Schlierenzauer (Austria) 1778 points (2) Ammann 1578 (3) Wolfgang Loitzl (Austria) 1300

=== March 9, 2009 (Monday) ===
==== Baseball ====
- World Baseball Classic:
  (teams in **bold** advance to the second round, teams in italics are eliminated)
  - Pool A in Tokyo, Japan:
    - **South Korea** 1–0 **Japan**
      - South Korea win the rematch in the game between both Pool A qualifiers, which only determined seeding for the next round.
  - Pool B in Mexico City, Mexico:
    - South Africa 3–14 Mexico
      - South Africa is eliminated. Mexico will next play the loser of Cuba vs. Australia.
  - Pool C in Toronto, Canada:
    - Canada 2–6 Italy
      - Italy and Venezuela will play to determine which team joins the United States in advancing from Pool C.
  - Pool D in San Juan, Puerto Rico:
    - Netherlands 1–3 **Puerto Rico**
      - Netherlands next plays a rematch against the Dominican Republic, with the winner advancing and the loser eliminated.

==== Basketball ====
- US college basketball
  - Men's conference championship games — winners earn bids to the NCAA tournament
    - CAA in Richmond, Virginia: Virginia Commonwealth 71, George Mason 50
    - MAAC in Albany, New York: Siena 77, Niagara 70
    - Southern in Chattanooga, Tennessee: Chattanooga 80, College of Charleston 69
    - West Coast in Paradise, Nevada: Gonzaga 83, Saint Mary's 58
  - Women's conference championship games — winners earn bids to the NCAA tournament
    - Atlantic 10 in Charlotte: Charlotte 59, Richmond 54
    - Southern in Chattanooga, Tennessee: Western Carolina 101, College of Charleston 87 (3 OT)
    - West Coast in Paradise, Nevada: Gonzaga 66, San Diego 56

==== Cricket ====
- England in West Indies:
  - 5th Test in Port of Spain, Trinidad, day 4:
    - England 546/6d and 80/3; West Indies 544 (Brendan Nash 109, Chris Gayle 102, Shivnarine Chanderpaul 147*). England lead by 82 runs with 7 innings remaining.
- Australia in South Africa:
  - 2nd Test in Durban, day 4:
    - Australia 352 and 331/5d (Phillip Hughes 160); South Africa 138 and 244/2. South Africa trail by 301 runs with 8 wickets remaining.
- Women's World Cup in Australia:
  - Group B:
    - Pakistan 161/7 (50 ov); Sri Lanka 104 (39.4 ov) in Canberra. **Pakistan win by 57 runs**.

=== March 8, 2009 (Sunday) ===
==== Athletics ====
- European Indoor Championships in Turin, Italy, day 3:
  - Men:
    - Shot put: (gold) Tomasz Majewski (Poland) 21.02 metres (silver) Yves Niaré (France) 20.42 (bronze) Ralf Bartels (Germany) 20.39
    - Pole vault: (gold) Renaud Lavillenie (France) 5.81 metres (silver) Pavel Gerasimov (Russia) 5.76 (bronze) Alexander Straub (Germany) 5.76
    - Heptathlon: (gold) Mikk Pahapill (Estonia) 6362 points (silver) Oleksiy Kasyanov (Ukraine) 6205 (bronze) Roman Šebrle (Czech Republic) 6142
    - 800 m: (gold) Yuriy Borzakovskiy (Russia) 1:48.55 (silver) Luis Alberto Marco (Spain) 1:49.14 (bronze) Mattias Claesson (Sweden) 1:49.32
    - Long jump: (gold) Sebastian Bayer (Germany) 8.71 metres (silver) Nils Winter (Germany) 8.22 (bronze) Marcin Starzak (Poland) 8.18
    - 1500 m: (gold) Rui Silva (Portugal) 3:44.38 (silver) Diego Ruiz (Spain) 3:44.70 (bronze) Yoann Kowal (France) 3:44.75
    - 60 m: (gold) Dwain Chambers (United Kingdom) 6.46 seconds (silver) Fabio Cerutti (Italy) 6.56 (bronze) Emanuele di Gregorio (Italy) 6.56
  - Women:
    - Triple jump: (gold) Anastasiya Taranova-Potapova (Russia) 14.68 metres (silver) Marija Šestak (Slovenia) 14.60 (bronze) Dana Veldáková (Slovakia) 14.40
    - High jump: (gold) Ariane Friedrich (Germany) 2.01 metres (silver) Ruth Beitia (Spain) 1.99 (bronze) Viktoriya Klyugina (Russia) 1.96
    - 800 m: (gold) Mariya Savinova (Russia) 1:58.10 (silver) Oksana Zbrozhek (Russia) 1:59.20 (bronze) Elisa Cusma Piccione (Italy) 2:00.23
    - 3,000 m: (gold) Alemitu Bekele (Turkey) 8:46.50 (silver) Sara Moreira (Portugal) 8:48.18 (bronze) Mary Cullen (Republic of Ireland) 8:48.47
    - 60 m: (gold) Yevgeniya Polyakova (Russia) 7.18 seconds (silver) Ezinne Okparaebo (Norway) 7.21 (bronze) Verena Sailer (Germany) 7.22

==== Auto racing ====
- Sprint Cup Series:
  - Kobalt Tools 500 in Hampton, Georgia
    - (1) Kurt Busch (Nevada) (2) Jeff Gordon (California) (3) Carl Edwards (Missouri)
      - Drivers' standings (after 4 races): (1) Gordon 634 points (2) Clint Bowyer (Kansas) 591 (3) Kurt Busch 588
- WTCC:
  - HSBC Race of Brazil in Curitiba, Brazil:
    - Round 1: (1) Yvan Muller (France) (2) Jordi Gené (Spain) (3) Rickard Rydell (Sweden)
    - Round 2: (1) Gabriele Tarquini (Italy) (2) Rydell (3) Gené
      - Drivers' standings (after 2 of 24 events): (1) Muller & Tarquini 15 points (3) Rydell & Gené 14

==== Badminton ====
- BWF Super Series:
  - All England Super Series in Birmingham:
    (Seeding in parentheses)
    - Men's singles: Lin Dan (China) (2) bt Lee Chong Wei (Malaysia) (1) 21–19, 21–12
    - Women's singles: Wang Yihan (China) bt Tine Rasmussen (Denmark) (1) 21–19, 21–23, 21–11
    - Men's doubles: Cai Yun/Fu Haifeng (China) (7) bt Han Sang Hoon/Hwang Ji Man (South Korea) 21–17, 21–15
    - Women's doubles: Zhang Yawen/Zhao Tingting (China) (7) bt Cheng Sui/Zhao Yunlei (China) 21–13, 21–15
    - Mixed doubles: He Hanbin/Yu Yang (China) (3) bt Ko Sung Hyun/Ha Jung Eun (South Korea) 13–21, 21–15, 21–9

==== Baseball ====
- World Baseball Classic:
  (teams in **bold** advance to the second round, teams in italics are eliminated)
  - Pool A in Tokyo, Japan:
    - China 0–14 **South Korea** (via mercy rule)
      - Korea will play against Japan on Monday to decide the group winner.
  - Pool B in Mexico City, Mexico:
    - South Africa 1–8 Cuba
      - Cuba hit 6 home runs.
    - Australia 17–7 Mexico (mercy rule)
      - Australia score 13 unanswered runs from 4–7 down after 4 innings, and set a WBC record of 22 hits.
  - Pool C in Toronto, Canada:
    - **United States** 15–6 Venezuela
      - The U.S. scores 8 runs in the 6th inning and advances to the second round. Venezuela next plays the winner of Canada vs Italy on Tuesday.
  - Pool D in San Juan, Puerto Rico:
    - Dominican Republic 9–0 Panama
    - Panama is eliminated, while the Dominicans will next play the loser of Netherlands vs Puerto Rico on Tuesday.

==== Basketball ====
- US college basketball
  - Men's conference championship game — winner earns a bid to the NCAA tournament
    - Missouri Valley in St. Louis: Northern Iowa 60, Illinois State 57 (OT)
  - Women's conference championship games — winners earn bids to the NCAA tournament
    - ACC in Greensboro, North Carolina: Maryland 92, Duke 89 (OT)
    - Big Ten in Indianapolis: Ohio State 67, Purdue 66
    - Conference USA in New Orleans: UCF 65, Southern Miss 54 (OT)
    - MAAC in Albany, New York: Marist 78, Canisius 63
    - SEC in North Little Rock, Arkansas: Vanderbilt 61, Auburn 54

==== Cricket ====
- England in West Indies:
  - 5th Test in Port of Spain, Trinidad, day 3:
    - England 546/6d; West Indies 349/4 (Chris Gayle 100 retired hurt). West Indies trail by 197 runs with 6 wickets remaining in the 1st innings.
- Australia in South Africa:
  - 2nd Test in Durban, day 3:
    - Australia 352 and 292/3 (Phillip Hughes 136*); South Africa 138. Australia lead by 506 runs with 7 wickets remaining.
      - Hughes scores his second century of the match.
- India in New Zealand:
  - 3rd ODI in Christchurch:
    - India 392/4 (50/50 ov, Sachin Tendulkar 163); (New Zealand) 334 (45.1/50 ov, Jesse Ryder 105). **India win by 58 runs, lead 5-match series 2–0.**
      - The aggregate total of 726 runs is the second-highest in the history of One Day Internationals.
- Women's World Cup in Australia:
  - Group A:
    - New Zealand 205 (48/50 ov); Australia 132/6 (33/50 ov) in North Sydney. **New Zealand win by 13 runs (D/L).**
    - South Africa 116 (45.2/50 ov); West Indies 117/8 (48.4/50 ov) in Newcastle. **West Indies win by 2 wickets**.

==== Football (soccer) ====
- African Championship of Nations:
  - Final:
    - Ghana 0–2 DR Congo
      - DR Congo win the inaugural edition of the tournament.

==== Golf ====
- PGA Tour:
  - Honda Classic in Palm Beach Gardens, Florida
    - Winner: (South Korea) Yang Yong-eun 271 (−9)
- LPGA Tour:
  - HSBC Women's Champions in Singapore
    - Winner: (South Korea) Jiyai Shin 277 (−11)

==== Tennis ====
- Davis Cup:
  - World Group first round, day 3:
    (Teams in **bold** advance to the quarterfinals)
    - **Argentina** 5–0 Netherlands in Buenos Aires, Argentina
    - **Czech Republic** 3–2 France in Ostrava, Czech Republic
      - Radek Štěpánek beat Gilles Simon 7–6(2) 6–3 7–6(0) in the fourth rubber to put Czech Republic through to a quarterfinals tie at home against Argentina.
    - **United States** 4–1 Switzerland in Birmingham, Alabama, United States
      - Andy Roddick clinch the decisive point for USA for the 11th time in a Davis Cup tie, defeating Stanislas Wawrinka 6–4 6–4 6–2.
    - **Croatia** 5–0 Chile in Poreč, Croatia
      - Croatia will host USA in the quarterfinals.
    - Sweden 2–3 **Israel** in Malmö, Sweden
      - Israel advance to the quarterfinals for just the second time in its Davis Cup history, after wins for Dudi Sela over Thomas Johansson and Harel Levy over Andreas Vinciguerra, both in five sets. For Sweden it's the first defeat ever after leading 2–1.
    - Romania 1–4 **Russia** in Sibiu, Romania
      - Dmitry Tursunov come back from two sets down to beat Victor Hănescu and book Russia's trip to Israel in the quarterfinals.
    - **Germany** 3–2 Austria in Garmisch-Partenkirchen, Germany
      - Nicolas Kiefer clinch victory for Germany with 7–6(3) 6–4 6–4 win over Jürgen Melzer in the fourth rubber. Austria lose in the first round for the sixth successive year.
    - **Spain** 4–1 Serbia in Benidorm, Spain
      - World No. 1 Rafael Nadal defeat Novak Djokovic 6–4 6–4 6–1 and sends Spain, the defending champion, to a quarterfinals tie at home against Germany.
- WTA Tour:
  - Monterrey Open in Monterrey, Mexico
    - Final: (France) **Marion Bartoli** def. (China) Li Na 6–4, 6–3

==== Winter sports ====
===== Alpine skiing =====
- Men's World Cup in Kvitfjell, Norway:
  - Super giant slalom: Cancelled

===== Cross-country skiing =====
- World Cup in Lahti, Finland:
  - 15 km freestyle men: (1) Alexander Legkov (Russia) 33min 5.9sec (2) Pietro Piller Cottrer (Italy) at 7.5 (3) Christian Hoffmann (Austria) 20.7
    - World Cup standings (after 26 of 32 events): (1) Dario Cologna (Switzerland) 991 points (2) Petter Northug (Norway) 872 (3) Axel Teichmann (Germany) 663
  - 10 km freestyle women: (1) Justyna Kowalczyk (Poland) 24min 38.6sec (2) Charlotte Kalla (Sweden) at 22.4 (3) Marthe Kristoffersen (Norway) 27.1
    - World Cup standings (after 26 of 32 events): (1) Petra Majdič (Slovenia) 1362 points (2) Kowalczyk 1291 (3) Aino-Kaisa Saarinen (Finland) 1276

===== Freestyle skiing =====
- World Championships in Inawashiro, Japan:
  - Dual moguls men: (gold) Alexandre Bilodeau (Canada) (silver) Jesper Bjoernlund (Sweden) (bronze) Tapio Luusua (Finland)
  - Dual moguls women: (gold) Aiko Uemura (Japan) (gold) Miki Ito (Japan) (bronze) Hannah Kearney (United States)
    - Uemura wins her second title of the championships.

===== Short track speed skating =====
- World Championships in Vienna, Austria:

===== Ski jumping =====
- Nordic Tournament:
  - World Cup in Lahti, Finland:
    - HS97: (1) Gregor Schlierenzauer (Austria) 242.0 points (92.5/92.5m) (2) Simon Ammann (Switzerland) 236.0 (90.5/94.5) (3) Dimitry Vassiliev (Russia) 234.0 (94.5/90.0)
      - The competition was moved from the 130m hill due to poor wind conditions.
      - World Cup standings (after 22 of 27 events): (1) Schlierenzauer 1752 points (2) Ammann 1498 (3) Wolfgang Loitzl (Austria) 1268

=== March 7, 2009 (Saturday) ===
==== Athletics ====
- European Indoor Championships in Turin, Italy, day 2:
  - Men:
    - High jump: (gold) Ivan Ukhov (Russia) 2.32 metres (silver) Kyriakos Ioannou (Cyprus) 2.29 (silver) Aleksey Dmitrik (Russia) 2.29
    - Triple jump: (gold) Fabrizio Donato (Italy) 17.59 metres (silver) Viktor Yastrebov (Ukraine) 17.25 (bronze) Igor Spasovkhodskiy (Russia) 17.15
    - 3,000 m: (gold) Mo Farah (United Kingdom) 7:40.17 (silver) Bouabdellah Tahri (France) 7:42.14 (bronze) Jesús España (Spain) 7:43.29
    - 400 m: (gold) Johan Wissman (Sweden) 45.89 seconds (silver) Claudio Licciardello (Italy) 46.32 (bronze) Ioan Vieru (Romania) 46.54
  - Women:
    - Pole vault: (gold) Yuliya Golubchikova (Russia) 4.75 metres (silver) Silke Spiegelburg (Germany) 4.75 (bronze) Anna Battke (Germany) 4.65
    - Long jump: (gold) Ksenija Balta (Estonia) 6.87 metres (silver) Yelena Sokolova (Russia) 6.84 (bronze) Olga Kucherenko (Russia) 6.82
    - 1,500 m: (gold) Anna Alminova (Russia) 4:07.76 (silver) Natalia Rodríguez (Spain) 4:08.72 (bronze) Sonja Roman (Slovenia) 4:11.42
    - 400 m: (gold) Antonina Krivoshapka (Russia) 51.18 seconds (silver) Nataliya Pyhyda (Ukraine) 51.44 (bronze) Darya Safonova (Russia) 51.85

==== Baseball ====
- World Baseball Classic:
  (teams in **bold** advance to the second round, teams in italics are eliminated)
  - Pool A in Tokyo, Japan:
    - China 4–1 Chinese Taipei
      - Chinese Taipei is the first team eliminated from the competition.
    - **Japan** 14–2 South Korea (via mercy rule)
      - Japan advance to the second round, while Korea will play against China on Sunday for the second berth from this pool.
  - Pool C in Toronto, Canada:
    - Canada 5–6 United States
    - Italy 0–7 Venezuela
  - Pool D in San Juan, Puerto Rico:
    - Dominican Republic 2–3 Netherlands
    - Panama 0–7 Puerto Rico

==== Basketball ====
- US college basketball
  - Men's conference championship games — winners earn bids to the NCAA tournament
    - Atlantic Sun in Nashville: East Tennessee State 85, Jacksonville 68
    - Big South in Radford, Virginia: Radford 108, VMI 94
    - Ohio Valley in Nashville: Morehead State 67, Austin Peay 65 (2 OT)
  - Women's conference championship games — winners earn bids to the NCAA tournament
    - Atlantic Sun in Nashville: East Tennessee State 58, Jacksonville 52
    - Ohio Valley in Nashville: Austin Peay 69, Eastern Illinois 65 (2 OT)

==== Cricket ====
- England in West Indies:
  - 5th Test in Port of Spain, Trinidad, day 2:
    - England 546/6d (Andrew Strauss 142, Paul Collingwood 161, Matt Prior 131*); West Indies 92/1. West Indies trail by 454 runs with 9 wickets remaining in the 1st innings.
- Australia in South Africa:
  - 2nd Test in Durban, day 2:
    - Australia 352; South Africa 138/7. South Africa trail by 214 runs, with three wickets remaining in the 1st innings.
- Women's World Cup in Australia:
  - Group B:
    - Pakistan 57 (29 ov); India 58/0 (10 ov) in Bowral. **India win by 10 wickets**.
    - England 277/5 (Claire Taylor 101); Sri Lanka 177/7 in Canberra. **England win by 100 runs.**

==== Football (soccer) ====
- OFC Champions League Group stage, matchday 5:
  (teams in italics are eliminated)
  - Group A: Port Vila Sharks (Vanuatu) 2–3 (New Zealand) Waitakere United
    - Waitakere gets level with Auckland on 7 points, ahead of their match on April 5 in Waitakere.
  - Group B: PRK Hekari United (Papua New Guinea) 1–0 (Solomon Islands) Koloale FC Honiara
    - Hekari goes to the top of the group on 6 points, with Koloale and Ba, who meet in the last match, on 4 points.

==== Rugby union ====
- World Cup Sevens in Dubai:
  - Women's final: New Zealand 10–15 **Australia**
  - Men's final: **Wales** 19–12 Argentina

==== Tennis ====
- Davis Cup:
  (teams in **bold** advance to the quarterfinals)
  - World Group first round, day 2:
    - **Argentina** 3–0 Netherlands in Buenos Aires, Argentina
      - Lucas Arnold Ker and Martín Vassallo Argüello see Argentina through to the quarterfinals for the eighth straight year with a comfortable 6–4 7–5 6–3 victory against Jesse Huta Galung and Rogier Wassen.
    - Czech Republic 2–1 France in Ostrava, Czech Republic
      - Tomáš Berdych and Radek Štěpánek's four-set defeat of Richard Gasquet and Michaël Llodra give the Czechs the lead.
    - United States 2–1 Switzerland in Birmingham, Alabama, United States
      - Bob and Mike Bryan beat Yves Allegro and Stanislas Wawrinka 6–3, 6–4, 3–6, 7–6(2) for their 15th Davis Cup win and put USA ahead in the tie.
    - **Croatia** 3–0 Chile in Poreč, Croatia
      - Mario Ančić and Marin Čilić seal Croatia's place in the next round, defeating Paul Capdeville and Nicolás Massú 6–3 6–3 3–6 6–4.
    - Sweden 2–1 Israel in Malmö, Sweden
      - While Simon Aspelin and Robert Lindstedt beat Andy Ram and Amir Hadad 6–4 1–6 7–6(4) 6–4 in the near-empty arena to give Sweden the lead in the tie, a crowd of 7000 people hold a demonstration against Israel recent military operation in Gaza Strip near the stadium, and several demonstrators who throw rocks and fire crackers at the police force and try to break into the Baltic Hall are arrested.
    - Romania 1–2 Russia in Sibiu, Romania
      - Marius Copil and Horia Tecău come back from two sets down to produce a surprise victory over Marat Safin and Dmitry Tursunov and keep Romanian hopes alive.
    - Germany 2–1 Austria in Garmisch-Partenkirchen, Germany
      - Philipp Kohlschreiber and Nicolas Kiefer defeat Julian Knowle and Alexander Peya 6–3 7–6(6) 3–6 6–4 to give Germany the lead.
    - Spain 2–1 Serbia in Benidorm, Spain
      - David Ferrer and Rafael Nadal both win the singles matches postponed from day 1 in straight sets and put Spain 2–0 ahead. Victor Troicki and Nenad Zimonjić keep Serbia in contention by winning the doubles rubber 7–6(5) 6–4 7–6(7) over Feliciano López and Tommy Robredo.

==== Winter sports ====
===== Alpine skiing =====
- Women's World Cup in Ofterschwang, Germany:
  - Slalom: (1) Sandrine Aubert (France) 1:46.28 (53:54 + 52.74) (2) Frida Hansdotter (Sweden) 1:46.71 (53.87 + 52.84) (3) Nicole Hosp (Austria) 1:47.10 (54.67 + 52.43)
    - Overall World Cup standings (after 30 of 34 races): (1) Lindsey Vonn (United States) 1588 points (2) Maria Riesch (Germany) 1219 (3) Anja Pärson (Sweden) 990
      - Vonn need just 32 more points in the remaining 4 races to clinch the title.
    - Slalom standings (after 8 of 9 races): (1) Riesch 625 points (2) Vonn 440 (3) Šárka Záhrobská (Czech Republic) 399
      - Riesch secure the slalom World Cup title.
- Men's World Cup in Kvitfjell, Norway:
  - Downhill: (1) Klaus Kroll (Austria) 1min 32.12sec (2) Michael Walchhofer (Austria) 1:32.39 (3) Manuel Osborne-Paradis (Canada) 1:32.58
    - Overall World Cup standings (after 33 of 38 races): (1) Ivica Kostelic (Croatia) & Benjamin Raich (Austria) 837 points (3) Aksel Lund Svindal (Norway) 829
    - Downhill standings (after 8 of 9): (1) Walchhofer 470 pts (2) Kroll 395 (3) Didier Défago (Switzerland) 337
      - Walchhofer need 10th place in the last race to secure the downhill title if Kroll wins, or 25th place if Kroll is second.

===== Cross-country skiing =====
- World Cup in Lahti, Finland:
  - 1.5 km sprint freestyle men: (1) Petter Northug (Norway) (2) Ola Vigen Hattestad (Norway) (3) Nikolay Morilov (Russia)
    - Overall World Cup standings (after 25 of 32 events): (1) Dario Cologna (Switzerland) 939 points (2) Northug 836 (3) Axel Teichmann (Germany) 663
    - Sprint standings (after 10 of 12 events): (1) Hattestad (NOR) 660 points (secure sprint World Cup title) (2) Tor Arne Hetland (Norway) 335 (3) Renato Pasini (Italy) 321
  - 1.3 km sprint freestyle women: (1) Petra Majdič (Slovenia) (2) Arianna Follis (Italy) (3) Pirjo Muranen (Finland)
    - Overall World Cup standings (after 25 of 32 events): (1) Majdic 1350 points (2) Aino-Kaisa Saarinen (Finland) 1276 (3) Justyna Kowalczyk (Poland) 1191
    - Sprint standings (after 10 of 12 events): (1) Majdic 725 points (secure sprint World Cup title) (2) Muranen 421 (3) Follis 414

===== Freestyle skiing =====
- World Championships in Inawashiro, Japan:
  - Moguls men: (gold) Patrick Deneen (United States) 23.41 points (silver) Tapio Luusua (Finland) 21.89 (bronze) Vincent Marquis (Canada) 21.66
  - Moguls women: (gold) Aiko Uemura (Japan) 24.71 (silver) Jennifer Heil (Canada) 22.88 (bronze) Nikola Sudová (Czech Republic) 21.76

===== Nordic combined =====
- World Cup in Lahti, Finland:
  - Gundersen HS130/10 km: (1) Magnus Moan (Norway) 26:34.5 (2) Anssi Koivuranta (Finland) 26:34.5 (3) Bill Demong (United States) 26:37.0
    - World Cup standings (after 21 of 23 events): (1) Koivuranta 1329 points (2) Moan 1270 (3) Demong 980

===== Ski jumping =====
- Nordic Tournament:
  - World Cup in Lahti, Finland:
    - Team HS130: (1) Austria 1017.5 points (Wolfgang Loitzl, Martin Koch, Thomas Morgenstern, Gregor Schlierenzauer) (2) Finland 1013.8 (Ville Larinto, Kalle Keituri, Harri Olli, Matti Hautamäki) (3) Norway 996.8 Anders Bardal, Tom Hilde, Johan Remen, Anders Jacobsen

===== Snowboarding =====
- World Cup in Moscow, Russia:
  - Big Air men: (1) Stefan Gimpl (Austria) (2) Thomas Franc (Switzerland) (3) Marko Grilc (Slovenia)

===== Speed skating =====
- World Cup Final in Salt Lake City, United States:
  - 500 m women: (1) Wang Beixing (China) 37.25 (2) Jenny Wolf (Germany) +0.14 (3) Yu Jing (China) +0.37
  - 1000 m men: (1) Shani Davis (United States) 1:06.42 **WR** (2) Trevor Marsicano (United States) +0.46 (3) Denny Morrison (Canada) +0.69
  - 1500 m women: (1) Kristina Groves (Canada) 1:54.08 (2) Maki Tabata (Japan) +0.71 (3) Brittany Schussler (Canada) +0.83
  - 5000 m men: (1) Sven Kramer (Netherlands) 6:06.64 (2) Håvard Bøkko (Norway) +3.30 (3) Carl Verheijen (Netherlands) +6.53
  - 100 m women: (1) Jenny Wolf (Germany) 10.25 (2) Yu Jing (China) +0.19 (3) Shihomi Shinya (Japan) +0.20
  - 100 m men: (1) Yuya Oikawa (Japan) 9.49 (2) Lee Kang-seok (South Korea) +0.14 (3) Yu Fengtong (China) +0.31

=== March 6, 2009 (Friday) ===
==== Athletics ====
- European Indoor Championships in Turin, Italy, day 1:
  - Men:
    - 60 m hurdles: (gold) Ladji Doucouré (France) 7.55 seconds (silver) Gregory Sedoc (Netherlands) 7.55 (bronze) Petr Svoboda (Czech Republic) 7.61
  - Women:
    - Shot put: (gold) Petra Lammert (Germany) 19.66 metres (silver) Denise Hinrichs (Germany) 19.63 (bronze) Anca Heltne (Romania) 18.71
    - Pentathlon: (gold) Anna Bogdanova (Russia) 4761 points (silver) Jolanda Keizer (Netherlands) 4644 (bronze) Antoinette Nana Djimou Ida (France) 4618
    - 60 m hurdles: (gold) Eline Berings (Belgium) 7.92 seconds (silver) Lucie Škrobáková (Czech Republic) 7.94 (bronze) Derval O'Rourke (Republic of Ireland) 7.97

==== Baseball ====
- World Baseball Classic:
  - Pool A in Tokyo, Japan:
    - Chinese Taipei 0–9 South Korea
      - A six-run first inning including a grand slam from Lee Jin-Young lead to Korea's easy win.

==== Basketball ====
- U.S. college basketball:
  - Cornell clinches its second straight Ivy League title with an 83–59 home win over Penn, and becomes the first team to secure a bid to the NCAA tournament.

==== Cricket ====
- England in West Indies:
  - 5th Test in Port of Spain, Trinidad, day 1:
    - England 258/2 (Andrew Strauss 139*)
- Australia in South Africa:
  - 2nd Test in Durban, day 1:
    - Australia 303/4 (Phillip Hughes 115, Simon Katich 108)
- India in New Zealand:
  - 2nd ODI in Wellington:
    - India 188/4 (28.4/34 ov). **No result, India lead 5-match series 1–0**.

==== Tennis ====
- Davis Cup:
  - World Group first round, day 1:
    - Argentina 2–0 Netherlands in Buenos Aires, Argentina
    - Czech Republic 1–1 France in Ostrava, Czech Republic
    - United States 1–1 Switzerland in Birmingham, Alabama, United States
      - Andy Roddick beat Marco Chiudinelli for his 30th win in Davis Cup, which puts him level with Andre Agassi in 6th place on USA all-time list.
    - Croatia 2–0 Chile in Poreč, Croatia
    - Sweden 1–1 Israel in Malmö, Sweden
      - The tie is being played in crowd-less arena for fear of anti-Israeli disturbances.
    - Romania 0–2 Russia in Sibiu, Romania
    - Germany 1–1 Austria in Garmisch-Partenkirchen, Germany
    - Spain 0–0 Serbia in Benidorm, Spain
      - The first day singles matches were postponed to Saturday.

==== Winter sports ====
===== Alpine skiing =====
- Women's World Cup in Ofterschwang, Germany:
  - Giant slalom: (1) Kathrin Zettel (Austria) 2min 36:48sec (1:19.56 + 1:19.92) (2) Elisabeth Gorgl (Austria) 2:36.60 (1:20:05 + 1:16.55) (3) Tanja Poutiainen (Finland) 2:37:00 (1:20.09 + 1:16.91)
    - World Cup overall standings (after 29 of 34 events): (1) Lindsey Vonn (United States) 1588 points (2) Maria Riesch (Germany) 1174 (3) Anja Pärson (Sweden) 990
      - Vonn needs just 87 more points to secure the World Cup title.
- Men's World Cup in Kvitfjell, Norway:
  - Downhill: (1) Manuel Osborne-Paradis (Canada) 1min 47.09sec (2) Michael Walchhofer (Austria) 1:47.40 (3) Aksel Lund Svindal (Norway) 1:47.46
    - World Cup overall standings (after 32 of 38 events): (1) Ivica Kostelic (Croatia) & Benjamin Raich (Austria) 837 points (3) Svindal 811

===== Nordic combined =====
- World Cup in Lahti, Finland:
  - Gundersen HS130/10 km: (1) Bill Demong (United States) 26:10.8 (6th place after jump) (2) Anssi Koivuranta (Finland) at 7.2 (1) (3) Jason Lamy-Chappuis (France) 11.5 (2)
    - Overall World Cup standings (after 20 out 23 races): (1) Koivuranta 1249 points (2) Magnus Moan (Norway) 1170 (3) Demong 720

===== Speed skating =====
- World Cup Final in Salt Lake City, United States:
  - 500 m men: (1) Yu Fengtong (China) 34.37 (2) Lee Kyou-hyuk (South Korea) +0.01 (3) Tucker Fredricks (United States) +0.14
  - 1000 m women: (1) Anni Friesinger 1:13.86 (Germany) (2) Sayuri Yoshii (Japan) +0.19 (3) Christine Nesbitt (Canada) +0.55
  - 1500 m men: (1) Shani Davis (United States) 1:41.80 **WR** (2) Trevor Marsicano (United States) +0.51 (3) Denny Morrison (Canada) +0.76
  - 3000 m women: (1) Martina Sáblíková (Czech Republic) 3:58.62 (2) Daniela Anschütz-Thoms (Germany) +1.26 (3) Kristina Groves (Canada) +1.38

=== March 5, 2009 (Thursday) ===
==== Baseball ====
- World Baseball Classic:
  - Pool A in Tokyo, Japan:
    - China 0–4 Japan
      - Japan begin the defense of its title with a win, thanks to a two-run homer from Shuichi Murata in the third inning and a no-hitter through four innings by Yu Darvish.

==== Basketball ====
- Euroleague Top 16, week 5:
  (teams in **bold** advance to the quarterfinals, teams in italics are eliminated)
  - Group E:
    - **Olympiacos** (Greece) 84–81 (Italy) AJ Milano
      - Both Olympiacos and **TAU Cerámica** clinch quarterfinal berths. The winner of their showdown next week in Vitoria-Gasteiz will finish atop the group.
  - Group F:
    - ALBA Berlin (Germany) 70–76 (Israel) Maccabi Tel Aviv
      - Maccabi fail to advance to the quarterfinals after 8 successive seasons. ALBA remain winless in the Top 16 stage.
  - Group G:
    - **Partizan Igokea** (Serbia) 63–56 (Greece) **Panathinaikos**
      - In front of a Euroleague-record crowd of 22,567 at Belgrade Arena, Partizan draw level with Panathinaikos atop the group, although PAO holds the tiebreaker.
  - Group H:
    - **Montepaschi Siena** (Italy) 86–70 (Croatia) Cibona Zagreb
      - Montepaschi get the 7-point win they needed to punch their quarterfinal ticket. The result also assures that **CSKA Moscow** will finish atop the group.

==== Football (soccer) ====
- Copa Libertadores group stage:
  - Group 3:
    - U. San Martín (Peru) 2–1 (Argentina) River Plate
  - Group 4:
    - América de Cali (Colombia) 1–3 (Brazil) São Paulo
  - Group 8:
    - Libertad (Paraguay) 2–0 (Argentina) San Lorenzo
- CONCACAF Champions League Quarterfinals, second leg:
  - Santos Laguna (Mexico) 5–2 (Canada) Montreal Impact
    - 2 late goals by Carlos Quintero give Santos Laguna a 5–4 aggregate win and a semifinals match with Atlante.

==== Winter sports ====
===== Freestyle skiing =====
- World Championships in Inawashiro, Japan:
  - Half-pipe men: (gold) Kevin Rolland (France) 45.5 points (silver) Justin Dorey (Canada) 45.3 (bronze) Xavier Bertoni (France) 43.5
  - Half-pipe women: (gold) Virginie Faivre (Switzerland) 40.4 (silver) Megan Gunning (CAN) 40.2 (bronze) Jen Hudak (United States) 38.4

=== March 4, 2009 (Wednesday) ===
==== Basketball ====
- Euroleague Top 16, week 5:
  (teams in **bold** advance to the quarterfinals, teams in italics are eliminated)
  - Group E:
    - Asseco Prokom Sopot (Poland) 72–92 (Spain) TAU Cerámica
      - TAU all but mathematically qualify to the quarterfinals. They will definitely do so if Olympiacos beat Milano on Thursday.
  - Group F:
    - **Regal FC Barcelona** (Spain) 90–79 (Spain) **Real Madrid**
      - Barcelona's win gives them a quarterfinal berth and the tie-break advantage over their Spanish rivals.
  - Group G:
    - Unicaja Málaga (Spain) 99–64 (Italy) Lottomatica Roma
  - Group H:
    - **CSKA Moscow** (Russia) 77–60 (Turkey) Fenerbahçe Ülker
      - CSKA's win gives them a quarterfinal berth, while Fenerbahçe is eliminated.
- NBA:
  - The Cleveland Cavaliers and Boston Celtics clinch the first two playoff berths, with wins over the Milwaukee Bucks and New Jersey Nets respectively.

==== Football (soccer) ====
- Copa Libertadores group stage:
  - Group 1:
    - Sport Recife (Brazil) 2–0 (Ecuador) LDU Quito
  - Group 2:
    - Deportivo Táchira (Venezuela) 0–1 (Argentina) Boca Juniors
  - Group 5:
    - Universitario de Sucre (Bolivia) 0–1 (Brazil) Cruzeiro
  - Group 7:
    - Universidad de Chile 3–0 (Bolivia) Aurora
- CONCACAF Champions League Quarterfinals, second leg:
  (Aggregate score in parentheses)
  - Marathón (Honduras) 0–1 (1–3) **Puerto Rico Islanders**
  - UNAM (Mexico) 0–1 (0–2) (Mexico) **Cruz Azul**
    - Puerto Rico and Cruz Azul will meet in the semifinals.

==== Winter sports ====
===== Freestyle skiing =====
- World Championships in Inawashiro, Japan:
  - Aerials men: (gold) Ryan St Onge (United States) (silver) Steve Omischl (Canada) (bronze) Warren Shouldice (Canada)
  - Aerials women: (gold) Li Nina (China) (silver) Xu Mengtao (China) (bronze) Jacqui Cooper (Australia)

=== March 3, 2009 (Tuesday) ===
==== American football ====
- National Football League:
  - The United States Coast Guard ends the search for three missing people, including football players Marquis Cooper and Corey Smith.

==== Cricket ====
- Sri Lanka in Pakistan:
  - 2nd Test in Lahore, day 3:
    - Sri Lanka 606; Pakistan 110/1. **Match abandoned. 2-match series drawn 0–0**.
      - The Test match and the series are abandoned following a terrorist attack against the Sri Lankan team as they were on the way to the ground for the third day's play. Seven players and assistant coach Paul Farbrace are injured, but none seriously. (Cricinfo), (BBC)
- India in New Zealand:
  - 1st ODI in Napier:
    - India 273/4 (MS Dhoni 84*, Virender Sehwag 77, 38/38 ov); New Zealand 162/9 (Martin Guptill 64, 28/28 ov). **India win by 53 runs (D/L method) and lead the 5-match series 1–0.**

==== Football (soccer) ====
- Copa Libertadores group stage:
  - Group 1:
    - Palmeiras (Brazil) 1–3 (Chile) Colo-Colo
  - Group 6:
    - Caracas (Venezuela) 2–0 (Mexico) Guadalajara
- CONCACAF Champions League Quarterfinals, second leg:
  - **Atlante** (Mexico) 3–0 (United States) Houston Dynamo
    - Atlante wins 4–1 on aggregate.

=== March 2, 2009 (Monday) ===
==== Cricket ====
- England in West Indies:
  - 4th Test in Bridgetown, Barbados, day 5:
    - England 600/6d & 279/2 (Alastair Cook 139*); West Indies 749/9d. **Match drawn, West Indies lead 5-match series 1–0**.
- Australia in South Africa:
  - 1st Test in Johannesburg, day 5:
    - Australia 466 and 207; South Africa 220 and 291. **Australia win by 162 runs, lead 3-match series 1–0**.
- Sri Lanka in Pakistan:
  - 2nd Test in Lahore, day 2:
    - Sri Lanka 606 (Thilan Samaraweera 214, Tillakaratne Dilshan 145, Kumar Sangakkara 104); Pakistan 110/1. Pakistan trail by 496 runs with 9 wickets remaining in the 1st innings.

==== Winter sports ====
===== Freestyle skiing =====
- World Championships in Inawashiro, Japan:
  - Skicross men: (gold) Andreas Matt (Austria) (silver) Thomas Zangerl (Austria) (bronze) Davey Barr (Canada)
  - Skicross women: (gold) Ashleigh McIvor (Canada) (silver) Karin Huttary (Austria) (bronze) Meryl Boulangeat (France)

=== March 1, 2009 (Sunday) ===
==== Auto racing ====
- Sprint Cup Series:
  - Shelby 427 in Las Vegas, Nevada:
    - (1) Kyle Busch (Nevada) (2) Clint Bowyer (Kansas) (3) Jeff Burton (Virginia)
      - Drivers' standings (after 3 races): (1) Jeff Gordon (California) 459 points (2) Bowyer 441 (3) Matt Kenseth (Wisconsin) 419

==== Cricket ====
- England in West Indies:
  - 4th Test in Bridgetown, Barbados, day 4:
    - England 600/6d & 6/0; West Indies 749/9d (Ramnaresh Sarwan 291, Denesh Ramdin 166). England trail by 143 runs with 10 wickets remaining.
      - Sarwan and Ramdin put on 261 for the sixth wicket as West Indies post their third-highest score ever, and the ninth-highest total in history.
- Australia in South Africa:
  - 1st Test in Johannesburg, day 4:
    - Australia 466 & 207 (Phillip Hughes 75); South Africa 220 & 178/2 (Graeme Smith 69). South Africa require another 276 runs to win with 8 wickets remaining.
- Sri Lanka in Pakistan:
  - 2nd Test in Lahore, day 1:
    - Sri Lanka 317/4 (Thilan Samaraweera 133*)

==== Football (soccer) ====
- Football League Cup Final in London:
  - Tottenham Hotspur 0–0 (aet) **Manchester United**
    - Manchester United win 4–1 on penalties.

==== Motorcycle racing ====
- Phillip Island World Championship round in Phillip Island, Victoria, Australia:
  - Superbike:
    - Race 1: (1) Noriyuki Haga (Japan) (2) Max Neukirchner (Germany) (3) Yukio Kagayama (Japan)
    - Race 2: (1) Ben Spies (United States) (2) Haga (3) Leon Haslam (United Kingdom)
      - Riders standings (after 1 of 14 events): (1) Haga 45 points (2) Neukirchner 30 (3) Haslam 26
  - Supersport:
    - (1) Kenan Sofuoğlu (Turkey) (2) Andrew Pitt (Australia) (3) Anthony West (Australia)
      - Riders standings (after 1 of 14 events): (1) Sofuoğlu 25 points (2) Pitt 20 (3) West 16

==== Golf ====
- World Golf Championships:
  - WGC-Accenture Match Play Championship in Marana, Arizona:
    - Final: **Geoff Ogilvy** (Australia) def. (England) Paul Casey 4 & 3
    - Playoff for 3rd place: **Stewart Cink** (United States) def. (England) Ross Fisher 1 up
- PGA Tour:
  - Mayakoba Golf Classic at Riviera Maya in Cancún, Mexico:
    - Winner: (United States) Mark Wilson 267 (−13)
- European Tour:
  - Astro Indonesia Open in Bali, Indonesia:
    - Winner: (Thailand) Thongchai Jaidee 276 (−12)
- LPGA Tour:
  - Honda LPGA Thailand in Bangkok, Thailand:
    - Winner: (Mexico) Lorena Ochoa 274 (−14)

==== Rugby league ====
- World Club Challenge in Leeds, England:
  - Leeds Rhinos (England) 20–28 (Australia) **Manly-Warringah Sea Eagles**

==== Tennis ====
- ATP Tour:
  - Delray Beach International Tennis Championships in Delray Beach, Florida, United States:
    - Final: (United States) **Mardy Fish** def. (Russia) Evgeny Korolev 7–5, 6–3

==== Winter sports ====
===== Alpine skiing =====
- Women's World Cup in Bansko, Bulgaria:
  - Super giant slalom: (1) Lindsey Vonn (United States) 1min 14.49sec (2) Fabienne Suter (Switzerland) 1:15.07 (3) Tina Maze (Slovenia) 1:15.40
    - Overall World Cup standings (after 28 of 34 races): (1) Vonn 1556 points (2) Maria Riesch (Germany) 1165 (3) Anja Paerson (Sweden) 986
- Men's World Cup in Kranjska Gora, Slovenia:
  - Slalom: (1) Julien Lizeroux (France) 1:40.11 (48.91 + 51.20) (2) Giuliano Razzoli (Italy) 1:40.45 (48.74 + 51.71) (3) Felix Neureuther (Germany) 1:40.67 (49.27 + 51.40)
    - Overall World Cup standings (after 31 of 38 races): (1) Ivica Kostelic (Croatia) 837 points (2) Benjamin Raich (Austria) 835 (3) Jean-Baptiste Grange (France) 777

===== Bobsleigh =====
- World Championships at Lake Placid, New York, United States:
  - Four-man: (1) United States (Steven Holcomb, Justin Olsen, Steve Mesler, Curtis Tomasevicz) 3:36.61 (2) Germany (André Lange, Alexander Rödiger, Kevin Kuske, Martin Putze) + 0.97 (3) Latvia (Jānis Miņins, Daumants Dreiškens, Oskars Melbārdis, Intars Dambis) + 1.00
    - United States wins its first World Championships bobsleigh title in 50 years and Latvia wins its first ever medal.

===== Cross-country skiing =====
- Nordic World Ski Championships in Liberec, Czech Republic:
  - 50 km Freestyle Mass Start men: (1) Petter Northug (Norway) 1hr 59.38.1 (2) Maxim Vylegzhanin (Russia) at 0.7sec (3) Tobias Angerer (Germany) 2.0
    - Northug wins his third title of the championships, and the Norwegian men win five out of six cross country gold medals to finish on top of the medals standings. Angerer wins his third medal of the championships and sixth medal of his career, but none of them is gold.
