= Rebecca Dowbiggin =

British rower

Personal information
- Born: 11 April 1983 (age 43) St Albans

Sport
- Sport: Rowing
Medal record
Women's rowing
Representing Great Britain
European Championships
Silver medal – second place	2008 Marathon	Eight
Bronze medal – third place	2007 Poznań	Eight

Rebecca Dowbiggin (11 April 1983 in St Albans, England) was the 7th woman to cox Cambridge in The Boat Race, the annual race against Oxford.

Dowbiggin grew up in Cambridge, attending Chesterton Community College and Impington International 6th Form College. She studied for a BA in Anglo-Saxon, Norse and Celtic at Emmanuel College, Cambridge. She started coxing as an undergraduate, and went on to cox the 2004 Cambridge University Lightweight Men’s Boat race crew. After enrolling for a PhD in 2005, she coxed the 2006 Cambridge University Women's Blue Boat. Two weeks before the 2007 Boat Race she secured the cox's seat, with Cambridge going on to win. She also coxed Cambridge in 2008 Boat race, won by Oxford, and the 2009 Cambridge boat, which she stated will be the last major event she will cox at.

Dowbiggin also coxed the England Women's Eight to a gold medal at the Commonwealth Rowing Championships in 2006 and the Great Britain Women's Eight to a bronze medal at the 2007 European Rowing Championships.
