= List of Nebraska Cornhuskers women's basketball seasons =

This is a list of Nebraska Cornhuskers women's basketball seasons. Nebraska competes as part of NCAA Division I, representing the University of Nebraska–Lincoln in the Big Ten. The team has completed fifty seasons and played 1,548 games.

Nebraska has appeared in seventeen NCAA Division I tournaments and thirteen other national postseason tournaments. The program has won three combined conference regular season and tournament championships across the Big Eight, Big 12, and Big Ten.

== Seasons ==
| Regular season champion | Tournament champion |

| Year | Coach | Overall | Conference | Standing | Postseason |
|---|---|---|---|---|---|
Independent (Note: The Big Eight held a midseason tournament each season from 1975–76 to 1981–82, but did not sponsor a regular-season championship until 1982–83.) (1975–1982)
| 1975–76 | George Nicodemus | 21–9 | | | AIAW regional / NWIT 5th |
| 1976–77 | George Nicodemus | 21–16 | | | |
| 1977–78 | Marcia Walker | 11–18 | | | |
| 1978–79 | Lorrie Gallagher | 23–13 | | | AIAW regional |
| 1979–80 | Lorrie Gallagher | 23–17 | | | AIAW regional |
| 1980–81 | Colleen Matsuhara | 18–13 | | | AIAW regional |
| 1981–82 | Colleen Matsuhara | 14–17 | | | |
Big Eight Conference (1982–1996)
| 1982–83 | Colleen Matsuhara | 14–14 | 5–9 | 5th | |
| 1983–84 | Kelly Hill | 16–12 | 6–8 | 6th | |
| 1984–85 | Kelly Hill | 10–18 | 5–9 | 6th | |
| 1985–86 | Kelly Hill | 11–17 | 4–10 | 7th | |
| 1986–87 | Angela Beck | 16–13 | 8–6 | 4th | |
| 1987–88 | Angela Beck | 22–7 | 11–3 | 1st | NCAA Division I second round |
| 1988–89 | Angela Beck | 14–14 | 5–9 | 7th | |
| 1989–90 | Angela Beck | 10–18 | 2–12 | T–7th | |
| 1990–91 | Angela Beck | 17–11 | 8–6 | 3rd | |
| 1991–92 | Angela Beck | 21–11 | 9–5 | 3rd | NWIT 5th |
| 1992–93 | Angela Beck | 23–8 | 10–4 | 2nd | NCAA Division I second round |
| 1993–94 | Angela Beck | 17–13 | 7–7 | 4th | |
| 1994–95 | Angela Beck | 13–14 | 4–10 | 7th | |
| 1995–96 | Angela Beck | 19–10 | 8–6 | T–3rd | NCAA Division I first round |
Big 12 Conference (1996–2011)
| 1996–97 | Angela Beck | 19–9 | 8–8 | 6th | |
| 1997–98 | Paul Sanderford | 23–10 | 11–5 | T–3rd | NCAA Division I second round |
| 1998–99 | Paul Sanderford | 21–12 | 8–8 | T–5th | NCAA Division I first round |
| 1999–00 | Paul Sanderford | 18–13 | 10–6 | 5th | NCAA Division I first round |
| 2000–01 | Paul Sanderford | 12–18 | 4–12 | 10th | |
| 2001–02 | Paul Sanderford | 14–16 | 4–12 | 11th | |
| 2002–03 | Connie Yori | 8–20 | 1–15 | 12th | |
| 2003–04 | Connie Yori | 18–12 | 7–9 | T–7th | WNIT second round |
| 2004–05 | Connie Yori | 18–14 | 8–8 | T–6th | WNIT second round |
| 2005–06 | Connie Yori | 19–13 | 8–8 | T–6th | WNIT quarterfinal |
| 2006–07 | Connie Yori | 22–10 | 10–6 | T–4th | NCAA Division I first round |
| 2007–08 | Connie Yori | 21–12 | 9–7 | 6th | NCAA Division I second round |
| 2008–09 | Connie Yori | 15–16 | 6–10 | T–7th | WNIT first round |
| 2009–10 | Connie Yori | 32–2 | 16–0 | 1st | NCAA Division I Sweet Sixteen |
| 2010–11 | Connie Yori | 13–18 | 3–13 | 12th | |
Big Ten Conference (2011–present)
| 2011–12 | Connie Yori | 24–9 | 10–6 | 6th | NCAA Division I first round |
| 2012–13 | Connie Yori | 25–9 | 12–4 | 2nd | NCAA Division I Sweet Sixteen |
| 2013–14 | Connie Yori | 26–7 | 12–4 | 3rd | NCAA Division I second round |
| 2014–15 | Connie Yori | 21–11 | 10–8 | 7th | NCAA Division I first round |
| 2015–16 | Connie Yori | 18–13 | 9–9 | T–7th | WNIT first round |
| 2016–17 | Amy Williams | 7–22 | 3–13 | T–11th | |
| 2017–18 | Amy Williams | 21–11 | 11–5 | T–3rd | NCAA Division I first round |
| 2018–19 | Amy Williams | 14–16 | 9–9 | T–6th | |
| 2019–20 | Amy Williams | 17–13 | 7–11 | 10th | Canceled (Note: Canceled due to the COVID-19 pandemic.) |
| 2020–21 | Amy Williams | 13–13 | 9–10 | 9th | WNIT second round |
| 2021–22 | Amy Williams | 24–9 | 11–7 | 6th | NCAA Division I first round |
| 2022–23 | Amy Williams | 18–15 | 8–10 | 8th | WNIT Super 16 |
| 2023–24 | Amy Williams | 23–12 | 11–7 | 5th | NCAA Division I second round |
| 2024–25 | Amy Williams | 21–11 | 10–8 | T–8th | NCAA Division I first round |
| 2025–26 | Amy Williams | 19-13 | 7-11 | 12th | NCAA Division I first round |
