= 2008–09 Iowa State Cyclones women's basketball team =

Intercollegiate basketball season

2008–09 Iowa State Cyclones women's basketball

NCAA tournament, Elite Eight
- Conference: Big 12 Conference

Ranking
- Coaches: No. 11
- AP: No. 17
- Record: 27–9 (11–5 Big 12)
- Head coach: Bill Fennelly (14th season)
- Associate head coach: Jack Easley (4th as associate, 6th overall season)
- Assistant coaches: Latoja Schaben (12th season); Jodi Steyer (7th season)
- Home arena: Hilton Coliseum (Capacity: 14,082)

2008–09 Big 12 Conference women's basketball standings
	Conf.				Overall
Team	W		L	PCT	W		L	PCT
No. 4 Oklahoma	15	–	1	.938	32	–	5	.865
No. 5 Baylor †	12	–	4	.750	29	–	6	.829
No. 17 Iowa State	11	–	5	.688	27	–	9	.750
No. 9 Texas A&M	11	–	5	.688	27	–	8	.771
No. 21 Kansas State	10	–	6	.625	25	–	8	.758
No. 25 Texas	8	–	8	.500	21	–	12	.636
Texas Tech	6	–	10	.375	16	–	15	.516
Kansas	6	–	10	.375	22	–	14	.611
Nebraska	6	–	10	.375	15	–	16	.484
Oklahoma State	4	–	12	.250	17	–	16	.515
Missouri	4	–	12	.250	13	–	17	.433
Colorado	3	–	13	.188	11	–	18	.379
† 2009 Big 12 Tournament winner Rankings from AP poll

The 2008–09 Iowa State Cyclones women's basketball team represented Iowa State University in the 2008–09 NCAA Division I women's basketball season. A member of the Big 12 Conference in the North Division, Iowa State played home games at the Hilton Coliseum in Ames, Iowa. Under 14th year head coach Bill Fennelly, Iowa State finished the season 27–9, including an 11–5 record in Big 12 play for a third place tie in conference standings, with a no. 11 ranking in the final Coaches Poll. In the 2009 NCAA Division I women's basketball tournament, Iowa State advanced to the Elite Eight round for the second time in program history.

== Previous season ==
Iowa State finished the 2007–08 season 21–13, including 7–9 in Big 12 games for a seventh place tie in the Big 12 standings. In the 2008 Big 12 Tournament, Iowa State advanced to the semifinal round. Iowa State received an at-large bid to the 2008 NCAA tournament, in which they made the second round.

== Roster ==
2008–09 Iowa State Cyclones women's basketball team
Players
Coaches

Pos.	#	Name	Height	Year	Previous school	Hometown
G	2	Whitney Williams	5 ft 7 in (1.7 m)	Fr	Homeschooled	Fort Worth, TX
G	3	Alexis Yackley	5 ft 7 in (1.7 m)	Fr	Sully Buttes	Onida, SD
G	4	Alison Lacey	6 ft 0 in (1.83 m)	Jr	Ballard	Canberra, Australia
F	5	Nicky Wieben	6 ft 4 in (1.93 m)	Sr	Ankeny	Ankeny, Iowa
G	10	Denae Stuckey	5 ft 8 in (1.73 m)	Jr	Butler County CC	Kansas City, KS
G	11	Kelsey Bolte	6 ft 1 in (1.85 m)	So	Battle Creek–Ida Grove	Ida Grove, IA
G	13	Anna Florzak	5 ft 10 in (1.78 m)	Jr	Notre Dame de Sion	Kansas City, MO
G	15	Heather Ezell	5 ft 9 in (1.75 m)	Sr	Kickapoo	Springfield, MO
F	22	Genesis Lightbourne	6 ft 0 in (1.83 m)	Jr	Faith Lutheran	Las Vegas, NV
G	23	Claire Rockall	5 ft 10 in (1.78 m)	Fr	Calasanctius	Oranmore, Ireland
G	30	Shellie Mosman	5 ft 10 in (1.78 m)	Fr	Carroll	Carroll, IA
F	31	Ashley Arlen	6 ft 1 in (1.85 m)	Fr	Cascade	Cascade, IA
F	32	Amanda Nisleit	6 ft 0 in (1.83 m)	Sr	Woodbury	Woodbury, MN
F	41	Toccara Ross	5 ft 11 in (1.8 m)	Sr	Kirkwood CC	Davenport, IA
F	44	Jocelyn Anderson	6 ft 4 in (1.93 m)	Sr	Des Moines Area CC	Gowrie, IA

Head coach

- Bill Fennelly (William Penn)

Assistant coach(es)

- Jack Easley (Missouri Valley College)
- Latoja Schaben (Toledo)
- Jodi Steyer (Colorado State)

Legend

- (C) Team captain
- (S) Suspended
- (I) Ineligible
- (W) Walk-on
- Injured
- Current redshirt

Roster
Last update: March 26, 2021

== Schedule and results ==
Date time, TV	Rank^{#}	Opponent^{#}	Result	Record	Site (attendance) city, state
Exhibition
November 2, 2008*; 2 p.m.		Buena Vista	W 74–37	0–0	Hilton Coliseum (N/A); Ames, IA
November 9, 2008*; 2 p.m.		Missouri Western State	W 80–55	0–0	Hilton Coliseum (9,859); Ames, IA
Regular Season
November 16, 2008*; 1 p.m.		UMKC	W 77–45	1–0	Hilton Coliseum (10,103); Ames, IA
November 20, 2008*; 7:05 p.m.		at Northern Iowa	W 79–54	2–0	McLeod Center (2,320); Cedar Falls, IA
November 23, 2008*; 2:05 p.m.		at Creighton	W 63–54	3–0	Omaha Civic Auditorium (1,285); Omaha, NE
November 28, 2008*; 3 p.m.		vs. Prairie View A&M; Waikiki Beach Marriott Classic	W 75–59	4–0	Stan Sheriff Center (1,306); Honolulu, HI
November 29, 2008*; 7:20 p.m.		vs. No. 5 Stanford; Waikiki Beach Marriott Classic	L 65–83	4–1	Stan Sheriff Center (1,275); Honolulu, HI
November 30, 2008*; 3 p.m.		vs. San Diego State; Waikiki Beach Marriott Classic	W 87–71	5–1	Stan Sheriff Center (1,300); Honolulu, HI
December 7, 2008*; 1:05 p.m., BTN		at Iowa; Hy-Vee Cy-Hawk Series	L 46–66	5–2	Carver–Hawkeye Arena (5,560); Iowa City, IA
December 11, 2008*; 7:06 p.m., Mediacom		Drake	W 65–52	6–2	Hilton Coliseum (10,232); Ames, IA
December 14, 2008*; 2 p.m.		Detroit	W 75–39	7–2	Hilton Coliseum (9,876); Ames, IA
December 21, 2008*; 2:30 p.m., Mediacom		Minnesota	W 58–42	8–2	Hilton Coliseum (9,675); Ames, IA
December 29, 2008*; 7:30 p.m.		Niagara; Cyclone Challenge	W 89–39	9–2	Hilton Coliseum (7,691); Ames, IA
December 30, 2008*; 7:30 p.m.		North Dakota; Cyclone Challenge	W 76–46	10–2	Hilton Coliseum (7,549); Ames, IA
January 3, 2009*; 2:06 p.m., Mediacom		Vanderbilt	W 55–51	11–2	Hilton Coliseum (8,227); Ames, IA
January 7, 2009*; 7 p.m.		IPFW	W 84–57	12–2	Hilton Coliseum (7,157); Ames, IA
January 10, 2009; 3:05 p.m., FSNMW		No. 21 Oklahoma State	W 63–55	13–2 (1–0)	Hilton Coliseum (8,036); Ames, IA
January 14, 2009; 7 p.m.		at No. 5 Baylor	L 57–68	13–3 (1–1)	Ferrell Center (6,183); Waco, TX
January 17, 2009; 2 p.m.		at No. 17 Kansas State	L 52–59	13–4 (1–2)	Bramlage Coliseum (6,279); Manhattan, KS
January 21, 2009; 7 p.m.		Missouri	W 65–42	14–4 (2–2)	Hilton Coliseum (10,260); Ames, IA
January 24, 2009; 8:05 p.m.		at Nebraska	W 62–48	15–4 (3–2)	Bob Devaney Sports Center (3,439); Lincoln, NE
January 31, 2009; 7 p.m.	No. 22	No. 14 Kansas State	W 60–50	16–4 (4–2)	Hilton Coliseum (11,656); Ames, IA
February 4, 2009; 7 p.m.	No. 21	No. 10 Texas A&M	W 67–50	17–4 (5–2)	Hilton Coliseum (10,278); Ames, IA
February 7, 2009; 3 p.m., FSNRM	No. 21	at Colorado	W 53–47	18–4 (6–2)	Coors Events Center (2,753); Boulder, CO
February 11, 2009; 7:07 p.m.	No. 16	at No. 2 Oklahoma	L 49–58	18–5 (6–3)	Lloyd Noble Center (7,253); Norman, OK
February 15, 2009; 2:40 p.m., ESPN2	No. 16	No. 13 Texas	L 52–55	18–6 (6–4)	Hilton Coliseum (12,242); Ames, IA
February 18, 2009; 7:07 p.m., FSNMW	No. 21	Nebraska	W 61–38	19–6 (7–4)	Hilton Coliseum (10,225); Ames, IA
February 22, 2009; 7:07 p.m., FSNMW	No. 21	at Kansas	L 47–58	19–7 (7–5)	Allen Fieldhouse (7,069); Lawrence, KS
February 25, 2009; 7:07 p.m.	No. 25	Colorado	W 76–63	20–7 (8–5)	Hilton Coliseum (10,161); Ames, IA
February 28, 2009; 8 p.m.	No. 25	at Texas Tech	W 59–52	21–7 (9–5)	United Spirit Arena (7,412); Lubbock, TX
March 3, 2009; 6:30 p.m.	No. 23	at Missouri	W 62–47	22–7 (10–5)	Mizzou Arena (1,501); Columbia, MO
March 7, 2009; 7 p.m.	No. 23	Kansas	W 59–49	23–7 (11–5)	Hilton Coliseum (12,689); Ames, IA
Big 12 Tournament
March 13, 2009; 7:30 p.m., FSNMW	No. 17 (3)	vs. No. 25 (6) Texas; Quarterfinals	W 59–55	24–7 (11–5)	Cox Convention Center (5,659); Oklahoma City, OK
March 14, 2009; 2:30 p.m., FSNMW	No. 17 (3)	vs. No. 5 (2) Baylor; Semifinals	L 57–63	24–8 (11–5)	Cox Convention Center (5,659); Oklahoma City, OK
NCAA tournament
March 22, 2009; 6 p.m., ESPN2	No. 17 (4 B)	vs. No. (13 B) East Tennessee State; First Round	W 85–53	25–8 (11–5)	E.A. Diddle Arena (N/A); Bowling Green, KY
March 24, 2009; 8:30 p.m., ESPN2	No. 17 (4 B)	vs. No. (12 B) Ball State; Second Round	W 71–57	26–8 (11–5)	E.A. Diddle Arena (2,615); Bowling Green, KY
March 28, 2009; 8:30 p.m., ESPN	No. 17 (4 B)	vs. No. (9 B) Michigan State; Sweet 16	W 69–68	27–8 (11–5)	Haas Pavilion (N/A); Berkeley, CA
March 30, 2009; 8 p.m., ESPN	No. 17 (4 B)	vs. No. 2 (2 B) Stanford; Elite Eight	L 53–74	27–9 (11–5)	Haas Pavilion (5,022); Berkeley, CA
*Non-conference game. ^{#}Rankings from AP Poll. (#) Tournament seedings in parentheses. B=Berkeley Region. All times are in Central Time.

== Rankings ==
Ranking movements Legend: ██ Increase in ranking ██ Decrease in ranking — = Not ranked RV = Received votes т = Tied with team above or below
	Week																		
Poll	Pre	1	2	3	4	5	6	7	8	9	10	11	12	13	14	15	16	17	Final
AP	RV	RV	25^{T}	RV	RV	—	—	—	RV	20	RV	22	21	16	21	25	23	17	Not released
Coaches	RV	24^{T}	22^{T}	22	RV	RV	RV	RV	25^{T}	20	22	23	23	20	23	24	22	19	11

== Awards and honors ==
- Heather Ezell
  - All-Big 12 Second Team
- Alison Lacey
  - All-Big 12 Honorable Mention
