= List of Kent State Golden Flashes women's basketball seasons =

The following is a list of seasons completed by the Kent State Golden Flashes women's basketball program at Kent State University in Kent, Ohio, United States. The team was established in 1973 as a club team and in 1975 as a varsity team, playing their first official game in January 1976. The Flashes play at the Division I level of the National Collegiate Athletic Association (NCAA) as members of the Mid-American Conference (MAC) East Division. Kent State began play in the MAC in 1981, the first year the MAC started sponsoring women's athletics. Since 1977, the team has played home games at the Memorial Athletic and Convocation Center. Through the 2023–24 season, the Golden Flashes have won five Mid-American Conference regular-season championships, four MAC tournament titles, and eight MAC East Division titles. In post-season play, the program has made six appearances in the NCAA tournament along with seven appearances in the Women's National Invitation Tournament (WNIT).

Conference division champions	Conference champions	Conference tournament champions	Postseason berth

Season	Head coach	Season results							Conference tournament result	Postseason result	Final AP Poll
Season	Head coach	Overall			Conference				Conference tournament result	Postseason result	Final AP Poll
Season	Head coach	Wins	Losses	%	Wins	Losses	%	Finish	Conference tournament result	Postseason result	Final AP Poll
Ohio Association of Intercollegiate Sports for Women
1975–76	Judy Devine	5	6	.455	—	—	—	—	—	—	—
1976–77	Judy Devine	9	8	.529	—	—	—	—	1–1; 5th place	—	—
1977–78	Laurel Wartluft	15	6	.714	—	—	—	—	2–1; 3rd place	—	—
1978–79	Laurel Wartluft	23	8	.742	—	—	—	—	2–1; 3rd place	—	—
1979–80	Laurel Wartluft	21	8	.724	—	—	—	—	1–2; 4th place	—	—
1980–81	Laurel Wartluft	24	10	.706	—	—	—	—	2–1; 2nd place	—	—
Mid-American Conference
1981–82	Laurel Wartluft	17	14	.548	7	4	.636	T-3rd	2–1; lost in quarterfinals	0–1 in NCAA tournament	—
1982–83	Laurel Wartluft	9	18	.333	6	12	.333	8th	Did not qualify	—	—
1983–84	Laurel Wartluft	5	22	.185	4	14	.222	9th	Did not qualify	—	—
1984–85	Laurel Wartluft	10	17	.370	6	12	.333	T-7th	Did not qualify	—	—
1985–86	Laurel Wartluft	11	16	.407	5	13	.278	9th	Did not qualify	—	—
1986–87	Richard Keast	15	13	.536	8	8	.500	T-4th	0–1; Lost in semifinals	—	—
1987–88	Richard Keast	9	19	.321	5	11	.313	T-6th	0–1; Lost in quarterfinals	—	—
1988–89	Richard Keast	9	18	.333	5	11	.313	T-7th	Did not qualify	—	—
1989–90	Bob Lindsay	5	22	.185	3	12	.188	T-8th	Did not qualify	—	—
1990–91	Bob Lindsay	17	12	.586	9	7	.563	T-3rd	1–1; Lost in semifinals	—	—
1991–92	Bob Lindsay	18	12	.600	9	7	.563	3rd	2–1; Lost in final	—	—
1992–93	Bob Lindsay	20	9	.690	12	6	.667	T-3rd	1–1; Lost in final	—	—
1993–94	Bob Lindsay	20	8	.714	12	6	.667	4th	1–1; Lost in semifinals	—	—
1994–95	Bob Lindsay	17	10	.630	12	5	.706	T-3rd	0–1; Lost in quarterfinals	—	—
1995–96	Bob Lindsay	24	7	.774	16	2	.889	1st	2–1; Lost in final	1–1 in NCAA tournament	—
1996–97	Bob Lindsay	20	10	.667	14	2	.875	2nd	2–1; Lost in final	—	—
1997–98	Bob Lindsay	23	7	.767	18	0	1.000	1st-East	3–0; Won tournament	0–1 in NCAA tournament	—
1998–99	Bob Lindsay	22	7	.759	14	2	.875	1st-East	2–1; Lost in final	—	—
1999–2000	Bob Lindsay	25	6	.806	15	1	.938	1st-East	3–0; Won tournament	0–1 in NCAA tournament	—
2000–01	Bob Lindsay	21	8	.724	14	2	.875	1st-East	2–1; Lost in final	—	—
2001–02	Bob Lindsay	20	11	.645	13	3	.813	1st-East	3–0; Won tournament	0–1 in NCAA tournament	—
2002–03	Bob Lindsay	16	13	.552	10	6	.625	1st-East	1–1; Lost in quarterfinals	—	—
2003–04	Bob Lindsay	19	10	.655	12	4	.750	T-2nd-East	0–1; Lost in quarterfinals	0–1 in WNIT	—
2004–05	Bob Lindsay	21	9	.700	12	4	.750	T-1st-East	2–1; Lost in final	—	—
2005–06	Bob Lindsay	21	9	.700	12	4	.750	2nd-East	2–1; Lost in final	—	—
2006–07	Bob Lindsay	15	13	.536	11	5	.688	2nd-East	0–1; Lost in quarterfinals	—	—
2007–08	Bob Lindsay	9	21	.300	5	11	.313	3rd-East	1–1; Lost in quarterfinals	—	—
2008–09	Bob Lindsay	19	10	.655	8	8	.500	2nd-East	0–1; Lost in opening round	—	—
2009–10	Bob Lindsay	20	11	.645	12	4	.750	2nd-East	1–1; Lost in semifinals	0–1 in WNIT	—
2010–11	Bob Lindsay	20	10	.667	11	5	.688	2nd-East	0–1; Lost in quarterfinals	0–1 in WNIT	—
2011–12	Bob Lindsay	6	21	.222	5	11	.313	5th-East	0–1; Lost in first round	—	—
2012–13	Danielle O'Banion	3	27	.100	1	15	.063	T-5th-East	0–1; Lost in first round		—
2013–14	Danielle O'Banion	7	23	.233	4	14	.222	6th-East	0–1; Lost in first round	—	—
2014–15	Danielle O'Banion	5	25	.167	3	15	.167	5th-East	0–1; Lost in first round	—	—
2015–16	Danielle O'Banion	6	23	.207	3	15	.167	T-5th-East	0–1; Lost in first round	—	—
2016–17	Todd Starkey	19	13	.594	13	5	.722	1st-East	0–1; Lost in quarterfinals	0–1 in WNIT	—
2017–18	Todd Starkey	13	19	.406	5	13	.278	4th-East	1–1; Lost in quarterfinals	—	—
2018–19	Todd Starkey	20	13	.606	11	7	.611	4th-East	1–1; Lost in quarterfinals	1–1 in WNIT	—
2019–20	Todd Starkey	19	11	.633	10	6	.625	T-1st-East	1–0; Tournament canceled	Postseason canceled due to COVID-19	—
2020–21	Todd Starkey	11	9	.550	10	6	.625	5th	0–1; Lost in quarterfinals	—	—
2021–22	Todd Starkey	19	12	.613	10	10	.500	T-6th	Did not qualify	1–1 in WNIT	—
2022–23	Todd Starkey	21	11	.656	12	6	.667	3rd	1–1; Lost in semifinals	0–1 in WNIT	—
2023–24	Todd Starkey	21	11	.656	13	5	.722	3rd	3–0; Won tournament	0–1 in NCAA tournament	—
Totals	49 seasons	764	635	.546	400	321	.555	5 MAC Regular-season titles 9 MAC East Division titles	39–31 in MAC tournament 4 MAC Tournament titles	1–6 in NCAA tournament 2–7 in WNIT	

Conference division champions	Conference champions	Conference tournament champions	Postseason berth
