= 2009 Big 12 Conference women's basketball tournament =

- Classification: Division I
- Teams: 12
- Site: Cox Convention Center; Oklahoma City, Oklahoma
- Champions: Baylor (2nd title)
- Winning coach: Kim Mulkey (2nd title)
- MVP: Jessica Morrow (Baylor)
- Attendance: 35,515 (overall); 4,340 (championship)
- Television: Cox Cable, FSN

2008–09 Big 12 Conference women's basketball standings
	Conf.				Overall
Team	W		L	PCT	W		L	PCT
No. 4 Oklahoma	15	–	1	.938	32	–	5	.865
No. 5 Baylor †	12	–	4	.750	29	–	6	.829
No. 17 Iowa State	11	–	5	.688	27	–	9	.750
No. 9 Texas A&M	11	–	5	.688	27	–	8	.771
No. 21 Kansas State	10	–	6	.625	25	–	8	.758
No. 25 Texas	8	–	8	.500	21	–	12	.636
Texas Tech	6	–	10	.375	16	–	15	.516
Kansas	6	–	10	.375	22	–	14	.611
Nebraska	6	–	10	.375	15	–	16	.484
Oklahoma State	4	–	12	.250	17	–	16	.515
Missouri	4	–	12	.250	13	–	17	.433
Colorado	3	–	13	.188	11	–	18	.379
† 2009 Big 12 Tournament winner Rankings from AP poll

The 2009 Big 12 Conference women's basketball tournament was the 13th edition of the Big 12 Conference's annual championship tournament, held at the Cox Convention Center in Oklahoma City from March 12 until March 15, 2009. The Tournament Champion, Baylor's Lady Bears, received an automatic bid to the 2009 NCAA Women's Division I Basketball Tournament.

The single-elimination tournament had four rounds, with the top four seeds receiving byes in the first round. Seeding was based on regular season records. The Tournament has been held every year since 1997. It was run simultaneously with the 2009 Big 12 Conference men's basketball tournament.

== Seeding ==
2009 Big 12 Conference women's basketball tournament seeds
Seed	School	Conf.	Over.	Tiebreaker
1	Oklahoma ‡#	15–1	32–5	
2	Baylor #	12–4	29–6	
3	Iowa State #	11–5	27–9	
4	Texas A&M #	11–5	27–8	
5	Kansas State	10–6	25–8	
6	Texas	8–8	21–12	
7	Texas Tech	6–10	16–15	
8	Kansas	6–10	22–14	
9	Nebraska	6–10	15–16	
10	Oklahoma State	4–12	17–16	
11	Missouri	4–12	13–17	
12	Colorado	3–13	11–18	
‡ – Big 12 Conference regular season champions, and tournament No. 1 seed. # – Received a single-bye in the conference tournament. Overall records include all games played in the Big 12 Conference tournament.

== Schedule ==
Session	Game	Time	Matchup	Television	Attendance
First round – Thursday, March 12
1	1	11:00 am	#5 Kansas State 68 vs #12 Colorado 51	Cox Cable	4,513
1	2	1:30 pm	#8 Kansas 61 vs #9 Nebraska 56	Cox Cable	4,513
2	3	5:00 pm	#6 Texas 62 vs #11 Missouri 59	Cox Cable	4,166
2	4	7:30 pm	#10 Oklahoma State 63 vs #7 Texas Tech 57	Cox Cable	4,166
Quarterfinals – Friday, March 13
3	5	11:00 am	#1 Oklahoma 76 vs #8 Kansas 59	FSN	7,634
3	6	1:30 pm	#4 Texas A&M 65 vs #5 Kansas State 63	FSN	7,634
4	7	5:00 pm	#2 Baylor 67 vs #10 Oklahoma State 62	FSN	5,659
4	8	7:30 pm	#3 Iowa State 59 vs #6 Texas 55	FSN	5,659
Semifinals – Saturday, March 14
5	9	12:00 pm	#4 Texas A&M 74 vs #1 Oklahoma 62	FSN	9,203
5	10	2:30 pm	#2 Baylor 63 vs #3 Iowa State 57	FSN	9,203
Final – Sunday, March 15
6	11	12:30 pm	#2 Baylor 72 vs #4 Texas A&M 63	FSN	4,340
Game times in CT. #-Rankings denote tournament seed

== Tournament bracket ==
- Times listed are Central Standard Time zone.

First round (March 12)
8	Kansas	61
9	Nebraska	56
5	Kansas State	68
12	Colorado	51
7	Texas Tech	57
10	Oklahoma State	63
6	Texas	62
11	Missouri	59

Quarterfinals (March 13)
1	Oklahoma	76
8	Kansas	59
4	Texas A&M	65
5	Kansas State	63
2	Baylor	67
10	Oklahoma State	52
3	Iowa State	59
6	Texas	55

Semifinals (March 14)
1	Oklahoma	62
4	Texas A&M	74
2	Baylor	63
3	Iowa State	57

Championship (March 15)
4	Texas A&M	63
2	Baylor	72

== All-Tournament team ==
Most Outstanding Player – Jessica Morrow, Baylor

Player	Team
Jessica Morrow	Baylor
Morghan Medlock	Baylor
Jhasmin Player	Baylor
Courtney Paris	Oklahoma
Danielle Gant	Texas A&M

== See also ==
- 2009 Big 12 Conference men's basketball tournament
- 2009 NCAA Women's Division I Basketball Tournament
- 2008–09 NCAA Division I women's basketball rankings
