= 2008–09 Oklahoma Sooners women's basketball team =

Intercollegiate basketball season

2008–09 Oklahoma Sooners women's basketball

Big 12 Champions

NCAA women's Division I tournament, Final Four
- Conference: Big Twelve Conference
- South

Ranking
- Coaches: No. 4
- AP: No. 2
- Record: 32–4 (14–2 Big 12)
- Head coach: Sherri Coale
- Assistant coaches: Stacy Hansmeyer; Jan Ross; Chad Thrailkill
- Home arena: Lloyd Noble Center

The 2008–09 Oklahoma Sooners women's basketball team represented the University of Oklahoma in the 2008–09 NCAA Division I basketball season. The Sooners were coached by Sherri Coale. The Sooners are a member of the Big Twelve Conference and qualified for the Final Four.

2008–09 Big 12 Conference women's basketball standings
	Conf.				Overall
Team	W		L	PCT	W		L	PCT
No. 4 Oklahoma	15	–	1	.938	32	–	5	.865
No. 5 Baylor †	12	–	4	.750	29	–	6	.829
No. 17 Iowa State	11	–	5	.688	27	–	9	.750
No. 9 Texas A&M	11	–	5	.688	27	–	8	.771
No. 21 Kansas State	10	–	6	.625	25	–	8	.758
No. 25 Texas	8	–	8	.500	21	–	12	.636
Texas Tech	6	–	10	.375	16	–	15	.516
Kansas	6	–	10	.375	22	–	14	.611
Nebraska	6	–	10	.375	15	–	16	.484
Oklahoma State	4	–	12	.250	17	–	16	.515
Missouri	4	–	12	.250	13	–	17	.433
Colorado	3	–	13	.188	11	–	18	.379
† 2009 Big 12 Tournament winner Rankings from AP poll

== Preseason ==
=== Exhibition ===
Date	Location	Opponent	Sooners points	Opp. points	Record
Nov. 6/08		Western State			
Nov. 11/08		Oklahoma Christian			

=== Preseason WNIT ===
Date	Location	Opponent	Sooners points	Opp. points	Record
Nov. 15/08	Norman, OK	UC Riverside	88	57	1-0
Nov. 19/08	Norman, OK	Middle Tennessee	85	65	2-0
Nov. 21/08	Norman, OK	Arizona State	70	57	3-0
Nov. 23/08	Norman, OK	North Carolina	79	80	3-1

== Regular season ==
- Reserve Nyeshia Stevenson hit back-to-back 3-pointers and gave Oklahoma (ranked No. 6 in the ESPN/USA Today Poll, ranked No. 5 in the AP poll) its first lead of the game with 3:43 to play. The Sooners made an improbable comeback from a 26-point halftime deficit to shock the California Golden Bears (No. 7 ESPN/USA Today, No. 9 AP) 86-75 on Saturday night in the Basketball By The Bay Classic.

Cal led by 17 points, 69-52, before Oklahoma (8-2) closed the game with a 34-6 run. Stevenson finished with 21 points and Courtney Paris had 18 points and 13 rebounds to extend her consecutive streak of double-doubles dating to her freshman season to 102 games in Oklahoma's third straight victory since their loss to top-ranked Connecticut on Nov. 30. Cal had won the only other two meetings with Oklahoma but this marked the first matchup between the schools since Nov. 28, 1987, when the Bears won 81-66 in the Rainbow Wahine Classic in Honolulu.

- January 4: The Sooners set a new school record for fewest points allowed in an 89-25 drubbing of North Carolina Central on Saturday. Whitney Hand scored 16 of her game-high 18 points in the opening half and Oklahoma blew out to a 50-15 lead in the first half.

Five Sooners scored in double-figures, including Courtney Paris, who finished with 11 points and 12 rebounds in only 22 minutes to stretch her NCAA record streak of consecutive double-doubles to 105 games.

=== Roster ===
Number	Name	Height	Position	Class
1	Nyeshia Stevenson	5-9	Forward/Guard	Junior
3	Courtney Paris	6-4	Center	Senior
4	Abi Olajuwon	6-4	Center	Junior
5	Ashley Paris	6-3	Forward	Senior
10	Carlee Roethlisberger	6-1	Forward	Sophomore
13	Danielle Robinson	5-9	Guard	Sophomore
14	Lauren Willis	5-11	Guard	Sophomore
15	Carolyn Winchester	5-11	Forward	Senior
21	Amanda Thompson	6-0	Forward	Junior
25	Whitney Hand	6-1	Guard	Freshman
31	Rose Hammond	5-9	Guard	Junior
45	Jasmine Hartman	5-10	Guard	Freshman
53	Jenny Vining	5-9	Guard	Sophomore

=== Schedule ===
Date	Location	Opponent	Sooners points	Opp. points	Record
Nov. 26/08	Norman	Marist	83	57	1-0
Nov. 30/08	Storrs, CT	Connecticut	78	106	1-1
Dec. 3/08	Norman	Creighton	69	49	2-1
Dec. 7/08	Jonesboro, AR	Arkansas State	87	57	3-1
Dec. 12/08	San Jose, CA	Cal State Bakersfield	105	84	4-1
Dec. 13/08	San Jose, CA	California	86	75	5-1
Dec. 21/08	Norman	Tulsa	94	42	6-1
Dec. 30/08	St. Louis, MO	Saint Louis	87	61	7-1
Jan. 04/09	Norman	NC Central	89	25	8-1
Jan. 10/09	Lincoln, NE	Nebraska	77	56	9-1
Jan. 14/09	Norman	Kansas State	64	48	10-1
Jan. 18/09	Norman	Texas A&M	71	59	11-1
Jan. 21/09	Boulder, CO	Colorado	72	58	12-1
Jan. 25/09	Norman	Texas	89	69	13-1
Jan. 28/09	Waco, TX	Baylor	56	51	14-1
Jan. 31/09	Norman	Missouri	78	56	15-1
Feb. 2/09	Oklahoma City	Tennessee	80	70	16-1
Feb. 8/09	Stillwater, OK	Oklahoma State	93	75	17-1
Feb. 11/09	Norman	Iowa State	58	49	18-1
Feb. 14/09	Lawrence, KS	Kansas	69	54	19-1

==== Notes ====
- Abi Olajuwon scored season-high seven points in 12 minutes versus Cal State Bakersfield on December 12. She grabbed a season-high 12 rebounds against North Carolina Central on January 4.
- Carlee Roethlisberger scored a season-high 12 points versus Arizona State on November 21.
- Nyeshia Steveson shot 44.0 percent from the field, including a 36.4 percent (51-of-140) mark from 3-point range, and was 42-of-69 (.609) from the free throw line. She was named Big 12 Player of the Week following her remarkable play at the Basketball by the Bay Classic in San Jose, California on December 12 and 13. Stevenson scored a career-high 23 points and five assists in rout of Cal State Bakersfield on December 12. She led OU's NCAA-record comeback victory against California on December 13) with a 21-point performance. All the points were scored in the second half, including the game-tying, go-ahead and game-winning field goals

== Player stats ==
Player	Games Played	Minutes	Field goals	Three Pointers	Free Throws	Rebounds	Assists	Blocks	Steals	Points
Courtney Paris	37	1072	236	0	116	503	57	108	34	588
Danielle Robinson	37	1116	180	0	119	106	217	3	82	479
Ashley Paris	37	1125	196	1	73	355	61	32	28	466
Nyeshia Stevenson	37	755	124	51	42	64	45	6	41	341
Whitney Hand	33	953	106	62	29	97	54	17	40	303
Amanda Thompson	36	786	104	7	29	164	67	31	44	244
Carlee Roethlisberger	37	482	54	19	16	59	16	2	11	143
Jenny Vining	35	457	39	30	8	28	24	2	7	116
Jasmine Hartman	35	332	27	5	10	29	38	5	11	69
Abi Olajuwon	27	162	13	0	11	59	3	4	7	37
Lauren Willis	15	65	4	2	0	2	1	0	3	10
Rose Hammond	18	71	2	0	3	13	7	0	4	7
Carolyn Winchester	8	24	0	0	0	0	4	1	1	0

== Postseason ==
=== NCAA basketball tournament ===
- Oklahoma Cit Regional
  - Oklahoma 76, Prairie View 47
  - Oklahoma 69, Georgia Tech 50
  - Oklahoma 70, Pittsburgh 59
  - Oklahoma 74, Purdue 68
- Final Four
  - Louisville 61, Oklahoma 59

== Awards and honors ==
- Nyeshia Stevenson, Big 12 Sixth Man Award
- Nyeshia Stevenson, Big 12 Player of the Week (Dec. 15, 2009)
- Nyeshia Stevenson, Led Big 12 in 3-point percentage during conference play with .414 percentage.
- Nyeshia Stevenson, OU record streak of nine consecutive games making at least one 3-pointer (Dec. 3 vs. Creighton to Jan. 14 vs. Kansas State)

== Team players drafted into the WNBA ==
Round	Pick	Player	WNBA club
1	7	Courtney Paris	Sacramento Monarchs
2	22	Ashley Paris	Los Angeles Sparks

== See also ==
- 2008–09 Oklahoma Sooners men's basketball team
