= Jim Flanery =

American basketball coach (born 1965)

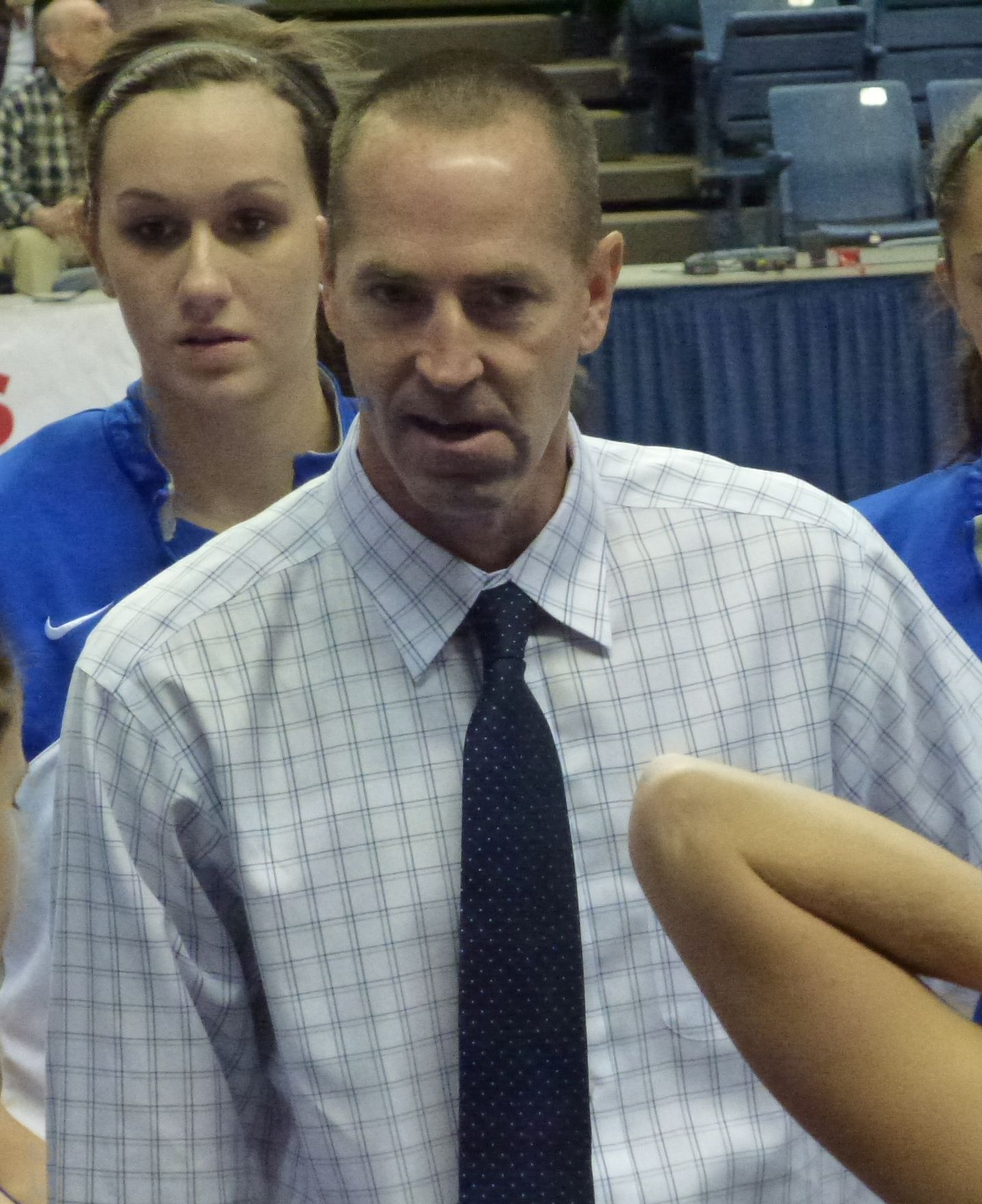
- Flanery speaking to his team during a timeout in a game in November 2014.

Current position
- Title: Head coach
- Team: Creighton
- Conference: Big East
- Record: 469–290 (.618)

Biographical details
- Born: February 8, 1965 (age 61); Guthrie Center, Iowa

Playing career
- 1985–1987: Creighton

Coaching career (HC unless noted)
- 1987–1990: Creighton (asst.)
- 1990–1992: Loras
- 1992–2002: Creighton (asst.)
- 2002–present: Creighton

Head coaching record
- Overall: 469–290 (.618)

James William Flanery II (born February 8, 1965) is the head women's basketball coach at Creighton University in Omaha, Nebraska, United States.

== Career ==
In his first five years coaching at Creighton, the team made the WNIT three times, and the NCAA Tournament in 2012. In 2004, Creighton won the 2004 WNIT Championship. In his first season, he won 24 games, the most ever by a Creighton rookie head coach. Flanery previously served as an assistant at Creighton for 11 years. He also served as an assistant basketball coach at Loras College.

== Head coaching record ==
Record table
Season	Team	Overall	Conference	Standing	Postseason
Creighton Bluejays (Missouri Valley Conference) (2002–2013)
2002–03	Creighton	24–9	13–5	T-1st	WNIT Round of 16
2003–04	Creighton	24–9	14–4	2nd	WNIT Champions
2004–05	Creighton	19–10	13–5	T-2nd	WNIT First Round
2005–06	Creighton	8–21	5–13	T-10th	
2006–07	Creighton	13–19	8–10	6th	
2007–08	Creighton	21–12	12–6	2nd	WNIT Second Round
2008–09	Creighton	22–12	14–4	2nd	WNIT Second Round
2009–10	Creighton	18–13	12–6	T-2nd	WNIT First Round
2010–11	Creighton	21–11	13–5	T-2nd	WNIT First Round
2011–12	Creighton	20–13	11–7	4th	NCAA First Round
2012–13	Creighton	25–8	15–3	T-1st	NCAA Second Round
Creighton (MVC):		215–137 (.611)	130–68 (.657)		
Creighton Bluejays (Big East Conference) (2013–present)
2013–14	Creighton	20–14	12–6	T-3rd	WNIT Second Round
2014–15	Creighton	17–14	10–8	T-5th	WNIT First Round
2015–16	Creighton	17–18	8–10	T-7th	WNIT First Round
2016–17	Creighton	24–8	16–2	T-1st	NCAA Second Round
2017–18	Creighton	19–13	11–7	4th	NCAA Second Round
2018–19	Creighton	15–16	8–10	T-6th	
2019–20	Creighton	19–11	11–7	T-3rd	
2020–21	Creighton	10–12	6–7	6th	
2021–22	Creighton	23–10	15–5	3rd	NCAA Elite Eight
2022–23	Creighton	22–9	15–5	3rd	NCAA Second Round
2023–24	Creighton	26–6	15–3	2nd	NCAA Second Round
2024–25	Creighton	26–7	16–2	2nd	NCAA First Round
2025–26	Creighton	16–15	11–9	T-5th	
2026–27	Creighton	0–0	0–0		
Creighton (Big East):		254–153 (.624)	152–81 (.652)		
Total:		469–290 (.618)			
National champion Postseason invitational champion Conference regular season champion Conference regular season and conference tournament champion Division regular season champion Division regular season and conference tournament champion Conference tournament champion
