= 2008–09 Texas A&M Aggies women's basketball team =

Intercollegiate basketball season

2008–09 Texas A&M Aggies women's basketball
- Conference: Big 12 Conference
- South

Ranking
- Coaches: No. 7
- AP: No. 10
- Record: 27–8 (11–5 Big 12)
- Head coach: Gary Blair
- Assistant coaches: Vic Schaefer; Kelly Bond; Johnnie Harris
- Home arena: Reed Arena

2008–09 Big 12 Conference women's basketball standings
	Conf.				Overall
Team	W		L	PCT	W		L	PCT
No. 4 Oklahoma	15	–	1	.938	32	–	5	.865
No. 5 Baylor †	12	–	4	.750	29	–	6	.829
No. 17 Iowa State	11	–	5	.688	27	–	9	.750
No. 9 Texas A&M	11	–	5	.688	27	–	8	.771
No. 21 Kansas State	10	–	6	.625	25	–	8	.758
No. 25 Texas	8	–	8	.500	21	–	12	.636
Texas Tech	6	–	10	.375	16	–	15	.516
Kansas	6	–	10	.375	22	–	14	.611
Nebraska	6	–	10	.375	15	–	16	.484
Oklahoma State	4	–	12	.250	17	–	16	.515
Missouri	4	–	12	.250	13	–	17	.433
Colorado	3	–	13	.188	11	–	18	.379
† 2009 Big 12 Tournament winner Rankings from AP poll

The 2008–09 Texas A&M Aggies women's basketball team represented Texas A&M University in NCAA Division I women's college basketball.

== Preseason outlook ==
The team placed 10th and 11th in the preseason Coaches Poll and AP Poll, respectively. The Big 12 coaches picked the squad to finish 5th in the conference, behind first-place favorite Oklahoma, followed by Texas, Iowa State, and Baylor. Athlon Sports ranked the Aggies 4th in their preseason poll, while Lindy's poll placed them 11th. A Sports Illustrated writer also ranked the team 11th in her power rankings.

== Recruiting ==
During the early signing period in November 2008, the Aggies signed Diamond Ashmore, Adrienne Pratcher, Kristi Bellock, and Cierra Windham. As of 20 November 2008, ESPN Hoopgurlz ranked the recruiting class 7th nationally.

== Players ==
=== Preseason honors ===
The Big 12 coaches selected Tanisha Smith as the Preseason Newcomer of the Year, and Tyra White as the Preseason co-Freshman of the Year. Takia Starks also made the preseason all-Big 12 team, and Danielle Gant received honorable mention.

Sporting News included Starks in its preseason All-American first team. She became the first player in school history to be named a preseason first-team All-American. She also made the 25-member Wade Trophy preseason watch list, and was one of the 30 John R. Wooden Award candidates.

In October 2008, Gant received the Academic Momentum Award, presented by the Scholar-Baller Program, a partner of National Consortium for Academics and Sports. The award is given to student-athletes who have "demonstrated significant academic improvement throughout their collegiate careers".

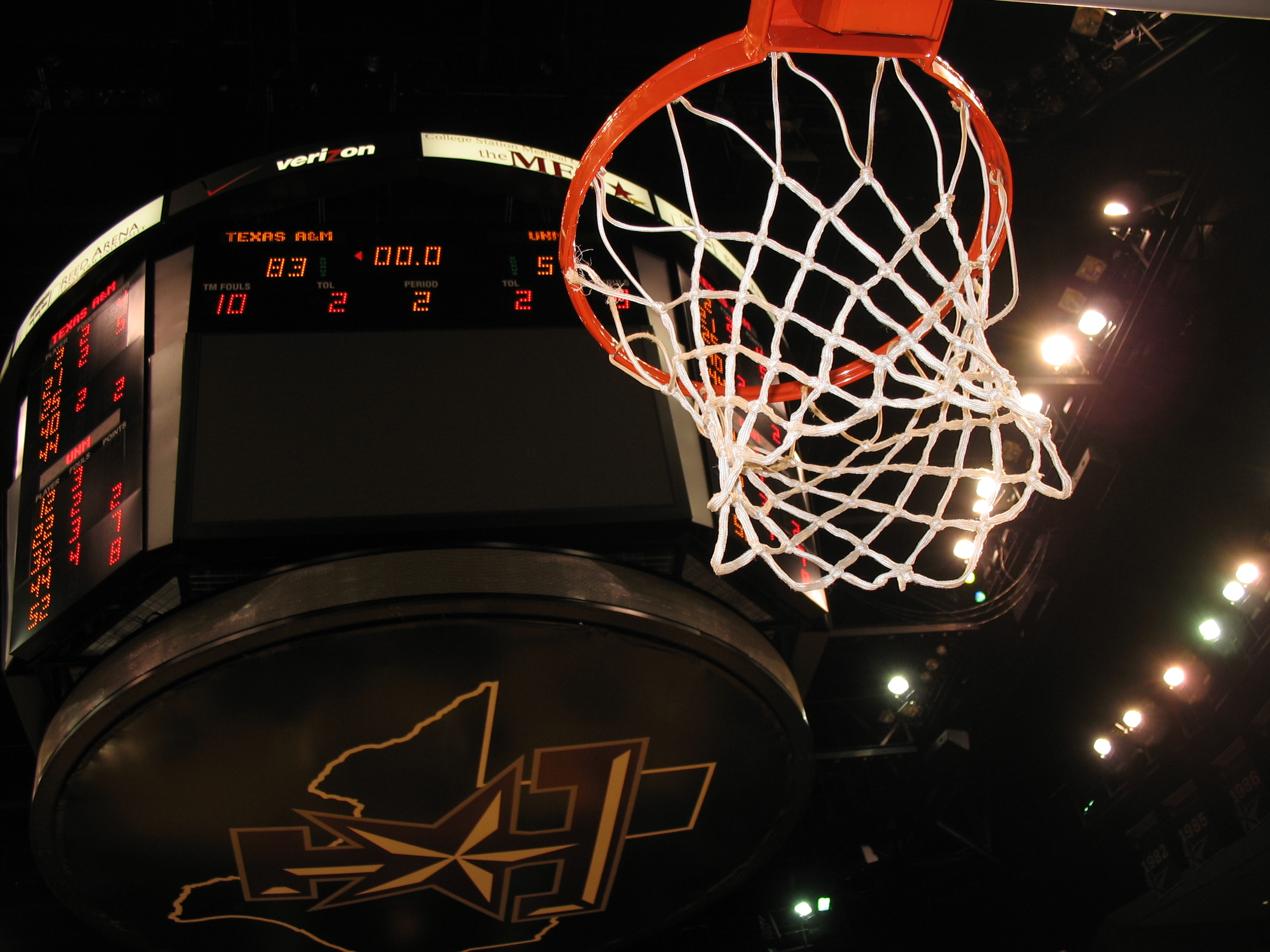
The scoreboard after the New Mexico game

=== Season accolades ===
Tyra White received the Big 12 Freshman of the Week honor for the week of 14–16 November. Adaora Elonu received the same honor for the week of 17–23 November, and Sydney Carter got the co-honor for the week of 24–30 November. Elonu picked up her second honor for the week of 1 December–7, and got another co-honor for the week of 15–21 December. Takia Starks received her first honor for the week of 22 December – 4 January. Danielle Gant got her first for the week of 5–11 January. After posting 11 points in a career-high 31 minutes of play against Oklahoma, and a game-high and career-high of 17 points at Kansas State, Sydney Carter grabbed the weekly honor for the week of 23 February – 1 March.

Upon defeating New Mexico 83–51, the Aggies set a school record for the largest margin of victory in a home game over a ranked opponent. The previous record was 19, which was compiled in the 2007–08 home matchup against Baylor.

Two players—Damitria Buchanan and Katrina Limbaha—made the 2008–09 Academic All-Big 12 women's basketball team. Both made the first team as they had a GPA greater than 3.20.

Starks became the all-time leading scorer of A&M after posting 19 points in the first round of the NCAA tournament.

== Schedule ==
Date time, TV	Rank^{#}	Opponent^{#}	Result	Record	Site (attendance) city, state
Exhibition
11/07/08*; 7:00 p.m.	No. 10	Houston Jaguars	W 86–43	0–0	Reed Arena (2,787); College Station, TX
Regular season
11/14/08*; 7:00 p.m.	No. 10	Mercer	W 73–45	1–0	Reed Arena (3,387); College Station, TX
11/16/08*; 4:00 p.m.	No. 10	vs. No. 23 Pittsburgh; State Farm Women's Tip-Off Classic	W 56–50	2–0	Pete Maravich Assembly Center (7,954); Baton Rouge, LA
11/20/08*; 6:00 p.m.	No. 7	at Michigan	W 59–56	3–0	Crisler Arena (1,125); Ann Arbor, MI
11/25/08*; 8:00 p.m.	No. 5	at Arizona	W 54–44	4–0	McKale Center (1,604); Tucson, Arizona
11/28/08*; 3:00 p.m.	No. 5	vs. Penn State; Timeout 4 HIV/AIDS Tournament	W 61–57	5–0	Firestone Fieldhouse (320); Malibu, CA
11/29/08*; 3/5:30 p.m.	No. 5	vs. Pepperdine; Timeout 4 HIV/AIDS Tournament	W 70–60	6–0	Firestone Fieldhouse (779); Malibu, CA
12/02/08*; 7:30 p.m.	No. 4	at Stephen F. Austin	W 77–36	7–0	William R. Johnson Coliseum (5,492); Nacogdoches, TX
12/07/08*; 1:00 p.m.	No. 4	SMU	W 80–48	8–0	Reed Arena (3,563); College Station, TX
12/13/08*; 7:30 p.m.	No. 3	Texas State	W 94–45	9–0	Reed Arena (3,602); College Station, TX
12/21/08*; 1:00 p.m., ESPNU	No. 3	TCU	W 64–50	10–0	Reed Arena (5,395); College Station, TX
12/30/08*; 7:00 p.m.	No. 3	No. 25 New Mexico	W 83–51	11–0	Reed Arena (5,543); College Station, TX
01/03/09*; 5:00 p.m.	No. 3	George Washington	W 78–59	12–0	Reed Arena (6,892); College Station, TX
01/05/09*; 6:00 p.m.	No. 3	at Florida State	L 53–60	12–1	Donald L. Tucker Center (2,373); Tallahassee, FL
01/10/09; 5:00 p.m., Mizzou SN	No. 6	at Missouri	W 62–56	13–1 (1–0)	Mizzou Arena (1,763); Columbia, MO
01/13/09; 7:00 p.m.	No. 6	Texas Tech	W 67–56	14–1 (2–0)	Reed Arena (3,860); College Station, TX
01/18/09; 3:00 p.m., FSN	No. 6	at No. 3 Oklahoma	L 59–71	14–2 (2–1)	Lloyd Noble Center (9,531); Norman, OK
01/21/09; 7:00 p.m.	No. 7	No. 4 Baylor; Battle of the Brazos	L 61–64	14–3 (2–2)	Reed Arena (5,234); College Station, TX
01/24/09; 6:00 p.m.	No. 7	at No. 25 Oklahoma State	W 60–50	15–3 (3–2)	Gallagher-Iba Arena (4,568); Stillwater, OK
01/28/09; 7:00 p.m.	No. 7	at No. 17 Texas; Lone Star Showdown	W 68–54	16–3 (4–2)	Frank Erwin Center (5,998); Austin, TX
01/31/09; 4:00 p.m.	No. 7	Kansas	W 73–60	17–3 (5–2)	Reed Arena (7,143); College Station, TX
02/04/09; 7:00 p.m.	No. 4	at No. 23 Iowa State	L 50–67	17–4 (5–3)	Hilton Coliseum (10,278); Ames, IA
02/08/09; 2:00 p.m.	No. 4	Nebraska	W 86–43	18–4 (6–3)	Reed Arena (4,468); College Station, TX
02/11/09; 7:00 p.m.	No. 8	at Texas Tech	L 53–60	18–5 (6–4)	United Spirit Arena (8,587); Lubbock, TX
02/14/09; 2:00 p.m.	No. 8	Colorado	W 79–50	19–5 (7–4)	Reed Arena (4,469); College Station, TX
02/21/09; 11:00 a.m., FSN	No. 11	No. 13 Texas; Lone Star Showdown	W 76–65	20–5 (8–4)	Reed Arena (5,840); College Station, TX
02/23/09; 6:30 p.m., ESPN2	No. 11	No. 2 Oklahoma	W 57–56	21–5 (9–4)	Reed Arena (7,035); College Station, TX
03/01/09; 2:00 p.m., FSN	No. 9	at No. 15 Kansas State	W 71–45	22–5 (10–4)	Bramlage Coliseum (6,089); Manhattan, KS
03/05/09; 7:00 p.m., FSN	No. 8	Oklahoma State	W 79–49	23–5 (11–4)	Reed Arena (7,075); College Station, TX
03/07/09; 7:30 p.m.	No. 8	at No. 6 Baylor; Battle of the Brazos	L 60–64	23–6 (11–5)	Ferrell Center (10,118); Waco, TX
Big 12 Tournament
03/13/09; 1:30 p.m., FSN	No. 9	vs. No. 16 Kansas State; Phillips 66 Big 12 Conference tournament	W 65–63	24–6	Cox Convention Center; Oklahoma City, OK
03/14/09; 12:00 p.m., FSN	No. 9	vs. No. 3 Oklahoma; Phillips 66 Big 12 Conference tournament	W 74–62	25–6	Cox Convention Center; Oklahoma City, OK
03/15/09; 12:30 p.m., FSN	No. 9	vs. No. 7 Baylor; Phillips 66 Big 12 Conference tournament	W 72–63	25–7	Cox Convention Center; Oklahoma City, OK
NCAA Tournament
03/22/09; 11:00 a.m., ESPN2	No. 9	vs. Evansville; 2009 NCAA Division I women's basketball tournament	W 80–45	26–7	Joyce Center; Notre Dame, IN
03/24/09; 6:00 p.m., ESPN2	No. 9	vs. Minnesota; 2009 NCAA Division I women's basketball tournament	W 73–42	27–7	Joyce Center; Notre Dame, IN
03/29/09; 1:30 p.m., ESPN2	No. 9	vs. Arizona State; 2009 NCAA Division I women's basketball tournament	W 84–69	27–8	Sovereign Bank Arena; Trenton, NJ
*Non-conference game. ^{#}Rankings from Coaches Poll. (#) Tournament seedings in parentheses. All times are in Central Standard Time.
