= Creighton Bluejays women's basketball =

2026–27 Creighton Bluejays women's basketball team
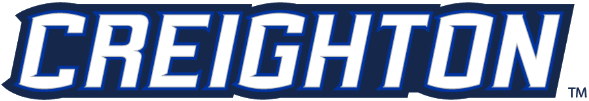
- University: Creighton University
- Head coach: Jim Flanery (25th season)
- Location: Omaha, Nebraska
- Arena: D. J. Sokol Arena (capacity: 2,950)
- Conference: Big East
- Nickname: Bluejays
- Colors: Blue, white, and navy blue

NCAA Division I tournament Elite Eight
- 2022
Other NCAA Division I tournament results
Sweet Sixteen	2022
Appearances	1992, 1994, 2002, 2012, 2013, 2017, 2018, 2022, 2023, 2024, 2025

Conference tournament champions
- Western Athletic Conference; 1992 Missouri Valley Conference; 2002, 2012

Conference regular-season champions
- Western Athletic Conference; 1991, 1992 Missouri Valley Conference; 2002, 2003, 2013 Big East Conference; 2017

The Creighton Bluejays women's basketball team represents Creighton University in Omaha, Nebraska, United States. The school's team currently competes in the Big East after moving from the Missouri Valley Conference following the 2012–13 season. The Bluejays had competed in the Missouri Valley since the 1992–1993 season. The women's basketball team began competing as an independent in 1973–1974 under coach Eddye McClure, which was their first winning season with an 11–6 record. The Bluejays are currently coached by Jim Flanery.

== Year by year results ==
Record table
Season	Coach	Overall	Conference	Standing	Postseason
Eddye McClure (Independent) (1973–1976)
1973–74	Eddye McClure	11–6			
1974–75	Eddye McClure	5–8			
1975–76	Eddye McClure	10–8			
Eddye McClure:		26–22 (.542)			
Gaye Kinnett (Independent) (1976–1979)
1976–77	Gaye Kinnett	10–10			
1977–78	Gaye Kinnett	12–8			
1978–79	Gaye Kinnett	11–9			
Gaye Kinnett:		33–27 (.550)			
Howard Faber (Independent) (1979–1980)
1979–80	Howard Faber	11–10			
Howard Faber:		11–10 (.524)			
Bruce Rasmussen (Independent) (1980–1992)
1980–81	Bruce Rasmussen	10–22			
1981–82	Bruce Rasmussen	6–21			
1982–83	Bruce Rasmussen	17–11			
1983–84	Bruce Rasmussen	18–10			
1984–85	Bruce Rasmussen	21–6			
1985–86	Russ Sarfaty	20–8			
1986–87	Bruce Rasmussen	23–7			NWIT 3rd Place
1987–88	Bruce Rasmussen	15–13			
1988–89	Bruce Rasmussen	6–21	2–8 (HCAC)	6th	
1989–90	Bruce Rasmussen	10–17	2–8 (HCAC)	T-5th	
Bruce Rasmussen (Western Athletic Conference) (1990–1992)
1990–91	Bruce Rasmussen	22–7	11–1 (WAC)	1st	
1991–92	Bruce Rasmussen	28–4	13–1 (WAC)	1st	NCAA Round of 32
Bruce Rasmussen:		196–147 (.571)	4–16 (.200) HCAC; 24–2 (.923) WAC		
Western Athletic Conference:			24–2 (.923)		
Connie Yori (Missouri Valley Conference) (1992–2002)
1992–93	Connie Yori	20–8	12–4	T-2nd	
1993–94	Connie Yori	24–7	14–2	2nd	NCAA Round of 32
1994–95	Connie Yori	18–9	12–6	4th	
1995–96	Connie Yori	15–13	10–8	T-4th	
1996–97	Connie Yori	8–19	7–11	8th	
1997–98	Connie Yori	16–12	11–7	3rd	
1998–99	Connie Yori	16–14	9–9	7th	WNIT 1st Round
1999-00	Connie Yori	12–15	7–11	6th	
2000-01	Connie Yori	17–11	11–7	4th	
2001-02	Connie Yori	24–7	16–2	1st	NCAA Round of 64
Connie Yori:		170–115 (.596)	109–67 (.619)		
Jim Flanery (Missouri Valley Conference) (2002–2013)
2002–03	Jim Flanery	24–9	13–5	T-1st	WNIT Semifinals
2003–04	Jim Flanery	24–9	15–3	2nd	WNIT Champions
2004–05	Jim Flanery	19–10	13–5	T-2nd	WNIT 1st Round
2005–06	Jim Flanery	8–21	5–13	T-9th	
2006–07	Jim Flanery	13–9	8–10	6th	
2007–08	Jim Flanery	21–12	12–6	4th	WNIT 2nd Round
2008–09	Jim Flanery	22–12	14–4	2nd	WNIT 2nd Round
2009–10	Jim Flanery	21–11	13–5	2nd	WNIT 2nd Round
2010–11	Jim Flanery	18–13	12–6	T-2nd	WNIT 1st Round
2011–12	Jim Flanery	20–13	11–7	4th	NCAA Round of 64
2012–13	Jim Flanery	25–8	15–3	T-1st	NCAA Round of 32
Missouri Valley:			240–134 (.642)		
Jim Flanery (Big East Conference) (2013–present)
2013–14	Jim Flanery	20–14	12–6	T-3rd	WNIT 2nd Round
2014–15	Jim Flanery	17–14	10–8	T-5th	WNIT First Round
2015–16	Jim Flanery	17–18	8–10	T-7th	WNIT First Round
2016–17	Jim Flanery	24–8	16–2	T-1st	NCAA second round
2017–18	Jim Flanery	19–13	11–7	4th	NCAA second round
2018–19	Jim Flanery	15–16	8–10	T–6th	
2019–20	Jim Flanery	19–11	11–7	T–3rd	
2020–21	Jim Flanery	10–12	6–7	6th	
2021–22	Jim Flanery	23–10	15–5	3rd	NCAA Elite Eight
2022–23	Jim Flanery	22–8	15–5	3rd	NCAA first round
2023–24	Jim Flanery	26–6	15–3	2nd	NCAA second round
Big East:			125–70 (.641)		
Jim Flanery:		427–268 (.614)	142–74 (.657) Missouri Valley; 125–70 (.641) Big East		
Total:		863–578 (.599)			
National champion Postseason invitational champion Conference regular season champion Conference regular season and conference tournament champion Division regular season champion Division regular season and conference tournament champion Conference tournament champion

== NCAA tournament results ==
The Bluejays have appeared in eleven NCAA Tournaments. Their record is 9–11.

Year	Seed	Round	Opponent	Result
1992	#7	First Round; Second Round	#10 Long Beach State #2 Stephen F. Austin	W 79–66; L 74–75
1994	#10	First Round; Second Round	#7 Bowling Green #2 Texas Tech	W 84–73; L 65–75
2002	#12	First Round	#5 Florida International	L 58–73
2012	#14	First Round	#3 St. John's	L 67–69
2013	#10	First Round; Second Round	#7 Syracuse #2 Tennessee	W 61–56; L 52–68
2017	#7	First Round; Second Round	#10 Toledo #2 Oregon State	W 76–49; L 52–64
2018	#11	First Round; Second Round	#6 Iowa #3 UCLA	W 76–70; L 86–64
2022	#10	First Round; Second Round; Sweet Sixteen; Elite Eight	#7 Colorado #2 Iowa #3 Iowa State #1 South Carolina	W 84–74; W 64–62; W 76–68; L 50–80
2023	#6	First Round	#11 Mississippi State	L 66–81
2024	#7	First Round; Second Round	#10 UNLV #2 UCLA	W 87–73; L 63–67
2025	#9	First Round	#8 Illinois	L 57–66

== WNIT and NWIT results ==
The Bluejays have appeared in eight Women's National Invitation Tournaments, and also appeared once in the WNIT's predecessor, the National Women's Invitational Tournament. Their combined record is 14–9. The Bluejays won the WNIT Championship in 2004.

Year	Round	Opponent	Result
1987	First Round; Semifinals; Third Place Game	Stephen F. Austin; California; Providence	W 76–68; L 82–86; W 91–89
1999	First Round	Kansas State	L 60–71
2003	First Round; Second Round; Third Round; Semifinals	Maine; Siena; Iowa; Auburn	W 74–67; W 96–86; W 70–64; L 62–73
2004	First Round; Second Round; Third Round; Semifinals; Championship	Colorado State; Washington; Oregon State; Richmond; UNLV	W 79–68; W 74–69; W 74–64; W 81–72; W 73–52
2005	First Round	Iowa	L 52–67
2008	First Round; Second Round	South Dakota State; Marquette	W 76–69; L 69–75 (OT)
2009	First Round; Second Round	UC Riverside; Kansas	W 64–51; L 64–79
2010	First Round; Second Round	Stephen F. Austin; Kansas	W 76–65; L 68–71
2011	First Round	Northwestern	L 63–89
2014	First Round; Second Round	Missouri; South Dakota State	W 77–51; L 51–62

== Retired numbers ==
Creighton Bluejays retired numbers
No.	Player	Position	Career	Year of Retirement
10	Tanya Warren	G	1984-88	1996
25	Connie Yori	G	1982-96	1992

== Roster ==
2026–27 Creighton Bluejays women's basketball team
Players
Coaches

Pos.	#	Name	Height	Year	Previous school	Hometown
G	1	Kendall McGee	6 ft 0 in (1.83 m)	So	Benilde-St. Margaret's	Brooklyn Park, MN
G	2	Jayla Williams	5 ft 10 in (1.78 m)	Fr	Ankeny	Ankeny, IA
G	3	Mya Moore	6 ft 0 in (1.83 m)	Fr	Orono	Independence, MN
G/F	5	Kate Amelotte	6 ft 1 in (1.85 m)	Fr	Wayzata	Plymouth, MN
F	9	Tara Dacic	6 ft 2 in (1.88 m)	So	Archbishop Riordan	Belgrade, Serbia
G	13	Allison Heathcock	6 ft 1 in (1.85 m)	Jr	Edmond North	Edmond, OK
F	22	Avery Cooper	6 ft 2 in (1.88 m)	RS Fr	Lake Zurich	Lake Zurich, IL
G	23	Neleigh Gessert	6 ft 1 in (1.85 m)	So	Millard West	Omaha, NE
G	24	Ava Zediker	5 ft 10 in (1.78 m)	So	Dowling Catholic	Des Moines, IA
G	30	Norah Gessert	6 ft 0 in (1.83 m)	So	Millard West	Omaha, NE
F	41	Nia Holloway	6 ft 0 in (1.83 m)	GS	Minnesota	Eden Prairie, MN

Head coach

- Jim Flanery (Creighton)

Assistant coach(es)

- Carli Berger (Creighton)
- Mike Jewett (Augustana (SD))
- Alexis Akin-Otiko (Creighton)
- Jessica January (DePaul)

Legend

- (C) Team captain
- (S) Suspended
- (I) Ineligible
- (W) Walk-on
- Injured
- Current redshirt

Roster
Last update: September 4, 2026
