= 2008–09 Nebraska Cornhuskers women's basketball team =

Intercollegiate basketball season

2008–09 Nebraska Cornhuskers women's basketball

2009 Women's National Invitation Tournament, Second round
- Conference: Big Twelve
- Record: 15–16 (6–10 Big-12)
- Head coach: Connie Yori
- Assistant coaches: Sunny Smallwood; Kellie Lewis-Jay; Tony Verdi
- Home arena: Devaney Center

2008–09 Big 12 Conference women's basketball standings
	Conf.				Overall
Team	W		L	PCT	W		L	PCT
No. 4 Oklahoma	15	–	1	.938	32	–	5	.865
No. 5 Baylor †	12	–	4	.750	29	–	6	.829
No. 17 Iowa State	11	–	5	.688	27	–	9	.750
No. 9 Texas A&M	11	–	5	.688	27	–	8	.771
No. 21 Kansas State	10	–	6	.625	25	–	8	.758
No. 25 Texas	8	–	8	.500	21	–	12	.636
Texas Tech	6	–	10	.375	16	–	15	.516
Kansas	6	–	10	.375	22	–	14	.611
Nebraska	6	–	10	.375	15	–	16	.484
Oklahoma State	4	–	12	.250	17	–	16	.515
Missouri	4	–	12	.250	13	–	17	.433
Colorado	3	–	13	.188	11	–	18	.379
† 2009 Big 12 Tournament winner Rankings from AP poll

The 2008–09 Nebraska Cornhuskers women's basketball team represented the University of Nebraska–Lincoln in the 2008–09 NCAA Division I women's basketball season. The Cornhuskers were coached by Connie Yori. The Cornhuskers are a member of the Big 12 Conference and did not qualify for the NCAA tournament. Those hopes were tempered with the loss of two-time first-team All-Big 12 forward Kelsey Griffin to a season-ending ankle injury in late-August. Despite playing without Griffin, the Huskers fought their way to a 9-3 record early in the season that included a dramatic come-from-behind win over No. 24 Arizona State on Dec. 28. Nebraska, which had received votes in the USA Today/ESPN Coaches Top 25 for five weeks, knocked off a Sun Devil squad that went on to advance to the 2009 NCAA Elite Eight. However, just days after defeating ASU, the Huskers took another hit inside with the loss of junior center Nikki Bober to a season-ending knee injury. Without two of their most experienced post players for a final non-conference game at five-time NCAA Final Four participant LSU, the Huskers closed non-conference play at 9-4 with all four setbacks coming to 2008 NCAA Tournament teams, including three on the road.

== Roster ==
Number	Name	Height	Position	Class
5	Kaitlyn Burke	1.7 m (5 ft 7 in)	Guard	Sophomore
11	Nicole Neals	1.68 m (5 ft 6 in)	Guard	Junior
13	Kala Kuhlmann	1.73 m (5 ft 8 in)	Guard	Junior
21	Harleen Sidhu	1.85 m (6 ft 1 in)	Forward	Freshman
22	Yvonne Turner	1.73 m (5 ft 8 in)	Guard	Junior
23	Kelsey Griffin	1.88 m (6 ft 2 in)	Forward	Junior
24	Dominique Kelley	1.7 m (5 ft 7 in)	Guard	Sophomore
35	Jessica Periago	1.93 m (6 ft 4 in)	Center	Sophomore
40	Cory Montgomery	1.88 m (6 ft 2 in)	Forward	Junior
42	Nikki Bober	1.93 m (6 ft 4 in)	Center	Junior
44	Catheryn Redmon	1.91 m (6 ft 3 in)	Center	Sophomore

== Schedule ==
=== Exhibitions ===
Date	Location	Opponent	Score	Record
Oct. 31	Devaney Center	Chadron State	102-30	1-0
Nov. 5	Nebraska-Kearney	Grand Island, NE (Heartland Events Center)	80-69	2-0

=== Regular season ===
- The Huskers participated in the Holiday Inn & Suites Express Midtown Thanksgiving Tournament from November 28–29.

Date	Location	Opponent	Score	Record
Nov. 14	Devaney Center	Weber State	96-47	1-0
Nov. 17	Omaha, NE	Creighton	72-67	2-0
Nov. 22	Devaney Center	Southern Utah	65-57	3-0
Nov. 24	Denver, CO	Denver	76-55	4-0
Nov. 28	Albuquerque, NM	Butler	67-54	5-0
Nov. 29	Albuquerque, NM	New Mexico	51-62	5-1
Dec. 2	Devaney Center	Oral Roberts	70-51	6-1
Dec. 6	Devaney Center	#18 Ohio State	65-69	6-2
Dec. 9	Devaney Center	Cal State Bakersfield	70-57	7-2
Dec. 12	Devaney Center	Long Beach State	76-44	8-2
Dec. 20	El Paso, TX	UTEP	53-63	8-3
Dec. 28	Devaney Center	#24 Arizona State	62-58	9-3
Jan. 1	Baton Rouge, LA	LSU	50-64	9-4
Big 12 Conference schedule
Jan. 10	Devaney Center	#4 Oklahoma	56-77	9-5 (0–1)
Jan. 14	Austin, TX	#16 Texas	60-74	9-6 (0–2)
Jan. 17	Columbia, MO	Missouri	66-67	9-7 (0–3)
Jan. 21	Devaney Center	Kansas	67-58	10-7 (1–3)
Jan. 24	Devaney Center	Iowa State	48-62	10-8 (1–4)
Jan. 27	Manhattan, KS	#14 Kansas State	40-51	10-9 (1–5)
Jan. 31	Boulder, CO	Colorado	73-75	10-10 (1–6)
Feb. 4	Devaney Center	#8 Baylor	71-76	10-11 (1–7)
Feb. 8	College Station, TX	#10 Texas A&M	43-86	10-12 (1–8)
Feb. 14	Devaney Center	Texas Tech	62-56	11-12 (2–8)
Feb. 18	Ames, IA	#21 Iowa State	38-61	11-13 (2–9)
Feb. 21	Devaney Center	Missouri	65-52	12-13 (3–9)
Feb. 25	Devaney Center	#20 Kansas State	52-47	13-13 (4–9)
Feb. 28	Lawrence, KS	Kansas	57-70	13-14 (4–10)
Mar. 3	Devaney Center	Colorado	75-64	14-14 (5–10)
Mar. 7	Stillwater, OK	Oklahoma State	82-74	15-14 (6–10)

=== Postseason ===
==== Big 12 Tournament ====
- March 12: Kansas 61, Nebraska 56

==== National Invitation Tournament ====
- March 25: New Mexico 54, Nebraska 43

== Player stats ==
Player	Games played	Minutes	Field goals	Three pointers	Free throws	Rebounds	Assists	Blocks	Steals	Points
Cory Montgomery	31	990	176	23	95	241	33	8	19	470
Yvonne Turner	31	869	119	57	69	106	57	8	67	364
Dominique Kelly	31	814	96	22	87	101	76	1	25	301
Tay Hester	31	627	70	1	37	129	40	3	23	178
Catheryn Redmon	31	719	70	0	38	172	9	67	20	178
Monique Whittaker	9	74	8	5	16	13	1	0	2	37
Kaitlyn Burke	31	638	48	23	4	39	45	0	16	123
Nicole Neals	31	467	35	25	3	28	42	0	10	98
Kala Kuhlmann	31	426	34	8	10	46	32	0	14	86
Jessica Periago	24	228	19	5	6	38	5	6	3	49
Nikki Bober	12	134	8	0	7	34	8	8	1	23
Harleen Sidhu	25	214	9	2	0	41	0	1	8	20

== Highlights ==
=== Team ===
- School-record sixth consecutive postseason tournament appearance
- One of five Big 12 Conference teams to post winning record in second half of Big 12 season
- One of nine Big 12 Conference teams to advance to postseason
- Top 25 Strength of Schedule according to CollegeRPI.com
- One of 16 postseason teams honored by NCAA for Academic Progress Rate (APR)

=== Individual ===
- Kaitlyn Burke scored in double figures three times during the season. She had a season-high 13 points on 6-of-11 shooting from the field versus Missouri on Jan. 17. She opened the season with 12 points, three rebounds, four assists and a career-high three steals in a win over Weber State in her first career start on Nov. 14. The last double digit game was on Dec. 28 against the Arizona State Sun Devils. She scored 12 points, three rebounds and a career-high matching three. Her career high in assists was set in the Huskers win over Long Beach State on Dec. 12.
- Cory Montgomery averaged 15.2 points and 7.8 rebounds per game. She ranked among the top-eight scorers and rebounders in the league in 2008-09. In sixteen Big 12 regular-season games, she averaged 16.2 points and 7.8 boards per game. In the final seven games of the year, Montgomery averaged 19.6 points and 9.0 rebounds per game.
- On January 10, All-American Courtney Paris led the Sooners with her 106th consecutive double-double, finishing with 18 points and 20 rebounds, including 10 points and 15 boards in the first half.
- Freshman Harleen Sidhu opened the season with four points, five rebounds, a blocked shot and a steal in NU's season-opening win over Weber State on Nov. 14.
- Yvonne Turner, led the Huskers with 67 steals on the season, which ranked among the top five players in the Big 12. She was also named to the Big 12 All-Defensive Team for the second straight season. Offensively, Turner ranked second on the team in scoring with 11.7 points per game.

== Awards and honors ==
Eight Nebraska women's basketball players claimed spots on the Big 12 Commissioner's Spring Academic Honor Roll. Nikki Bober, Kala Kuhlmann and Harleen Sidhu posted perfect 4.0 GPAs. Bober, Kuhlmann and Sidhu were joined on the spring honor roll by teammates Kaitlyn Burke, Kelsey Griffin, Cory Montgomery, Nicole Neals and Jessica Periago.

- Nikki Bober, Big 12 Commissioner's Spring Honor Roll
- Kaitlyn Burke, Big 12 Commissioner's Spring Honor Roll
- Kaitlyn Burke, Nebraska’s Husker Award
- Kelsey Griffin, Big 12 Commissioner's Spring Honor Roll
- Kala Kuhlmann, Big 12 Commissioner's Spring Honor Roll
- Kala Kuhlmann, Nebraska's Teammate Award
- Cory Montgomery, Big 12 Commissioner's Spring Honor Roll
- Cory Montgomery, honorable-mention All-Big 12 Conference selection
- Cory Montgomery, Nebraska's Offensive Player of the Year
- Nicole Neals, Big 12 Commissioner's Spring Honor Roll
- Jessica Periago, Big 12 Commissioner's Spring Honor Roll
- Harleen Sidhu, Two-Time Big 12 Commissioner's Honor Roll (Fall 2008, Spring 2009)
- Yvonne Turner, All Big-12 Honors
- Yvonne Turner, Big 12 All-Defensive Team (second straight season)
- Yvonne Turner, Nebraska's Defensive Player of the Year (Second straight season)

== Team players drafted into the WNBA ==
No one from the Huskers was selected in the 2009 WNBA draft.
