= Iowa Corn Cy-Hawk Series =

Annual intercollegiate athletic competition

- Teams: Iowa State; Iowa

Statistics
- Total meetings: 21
- Most wins: Iowa State
- All-time record: 11 Iowa State – 9 Iowa – 1 tie

Trophy

The Iowa Corn Cy-Hawk Series is an annual athletic competition between Iowa State University and the University of Iowa. On April 12, 2011, it was announced that the competition would be sponsored by the Iowa Corn Promotion Board and the Iowa Corn Growers Association. From 2004 to 2011, it was sponsored by Hy-Vee and called the Hy-Vee Cy-Hawk Series. The competition includes all head-to-head regular season competitions between the two archrival universities in all shared sports. Iowa State holds a two season lead after clinching the 2025-2026 title.

== Competition format ==
Each regular-season game, match, or meet between the Iowa State Cyclones and the Iowa Hawkeyes is counted toward the series championship. The winning team in each sport earns two points for their university (except for football, which is worth three points). In the event that a contest ends in a tie, the points are split. For academics, each school earns a single point if the graduation rate for student athletes exceeds the overall student body rate. The university with the most overall points at the end of the academic year is awarded the Iowa Corn Cy-Hawk Series Trophy (not to be confused with the Cy-Hawk Trophy, which is awarded to the winner of the schools' annual football game). If both schools tie on points at the end of the academic year (as in 2015–16), the school that won the trophy the previous year keeps the series trophy.

== History ==
The Cy-Hawk Series Trophy originated in 2004. Iowa State currently holds the lead in the series, with 11 titles to Iowa's 9. Due to the COVID pandemic, the Cy-Hawk Series was paused in 2020–2021.

=== Overall results ===
| Sport | Years | Total Series | Total Points |
|---|---|---|---|
| M Golf | (2007–08) | Iowa State 1–0 | Iowa State 2–0 |
| Volleyball | (2006–07)–present | Iowa State 16–4 | Iowa State 32–8 |
| Football | (2004–05)–present | Iowa 14–8 | Iowa 42–24 |
| W Soccer | (2004–05)–present | Iowa 15–6–1 | Iowa 31–13 |
| M Cross Country | (2007–08)–present | Iowa State 19–0 | Iowa State 38–0 |
| W Cross Country | (2007–08)–present | Iowa State 17–2 | Iowa State 34-4 |
| W Basketball | (2004–05)–present | Iowa 12–9 | Iowa 24–16 |
| W Gymnastics | (2004–05)–(2024-2025) | Iowa State 14–14 | Tie 28–28 |
| M Basketball | (2004–05)–present | Iowa State 13-8 | Iowa State 26–16 |
| W Tennis | (2009–10); (2011–12)–(2014–15); (2016-2017)–present | Iowa 9–4 | Iowa 18–8 |
| Wrestling | (2004–05)–present | Iowa 20–2 | Iowa 40–4 |
| W Swimming | (2004–05)–present | Iowa 17–4 | Iowa 34–8 |
| Softball | (2004–05)–present | Iowa State 8–8–3 | Tie 19–19 |
| Academics | (2010–11)–(2017-2018) | Iowa 4–2–2 | Iowa 6–4 |
| Total | (2004–05)–present | Iowa 127–123–6 | Iowa 270–256 |

=== 2004–05 Iowa (1-0) ===
Iowa victories are shaded ██ gold. Iowa State victories shaded in ██ cardinal.

| Date | Site | Sport | Winning team | Series |
|---|---|---|---|---|
| September 11, 2004 | Iowa City | Football | Iowa | Iowa 3–0 |
| October 31, 2004 | Ames | W Soccer | Iowa State | Iowa 3–2 |
| December 1, 2004 | Iowa City | W Basketball | Iowa | Iowa 5–2 |
| December 4, 2004 | Iowa City | W Swimming | Iowa | Iowa 7–2 |
| December 5, 2004 | Iowa City | Wrestling | Iowa State | Iowa 7–4 |
| December 10, 2004 | Iowa City | M Basketball | Iowa | Iowa 9–4 |
| January 28, 2005 | Ames | W Gymnastics | Iowa State | Iowa 9–6 |
| February 15, 2005 | Iowa City | W Gymnastics | Iowa State | Iowa 9–8 |
| April 19, 2005 | Iowa City | Softball | Iowa | Iowa 11–8 |

=== 2005–06 Tied (1-1) ===
Iowa victories are shaded ██ gold. Iowa State victories shaded in ██ cardinal.

| Date | Site | Sport | Winning team | Series |
|---|---|---|---|---|
| September 7, 2005 | Iowa City | W Soccer | Iowa State | Iowa State 2–0 |
| September 10, 2005 | Ames | Football | Iowa State | Iowa State 5–0 |
| December 2, 2005 | Ames | Wrestling | Iowa | Iowa State 5–2 |
| December 8, 2005 | Ames | W Basketball | Iowa State | Iowa State 7–2 |
| December 9, 2005 | Ames | M Basketball | Iowa State | Iowa State 9–2 |
| December 9, 2005 | Ames | W Swimming | Iowa | Iowa State 9–4 |
| January 28, 2006 | Iowa City | W Gymnastics | Iowa State | Iowa State 11–4 |
| March 17, 2006 | Ames | W Gymnastics | Iowa State | Iowa State 13–4 |
| March 17, 2006 | Ames | Softball | Iowa | Iowa State 13–6 |

=== 2006–07 Iowa (2-1) ===
Iowa victories are shaded ██ gold. Iowa State victories shaded in ██ cardinal.

| Date | Site | Sport | Winning team | Series |
|---|---|---|---|---|
| August 26, 2006 | Iowa City | Volleyball | Iowa State | Iowa State 2–0 |
| September 12, 2006 | Ames | W Soccer | Tie | Tied 2–2 |
| September 16, 2006 | Iowa City | Football | Iowa | Iowa 5–2 |
| November 30, 2006 | Iowa City | W Basketball | Iowa State | Iowa 5–4 |
| December 3, 2006 | Iowa City | Wrestling | Iowa | Iowa 7–4 |
| December 8, 2006 | Iowa City | M Basketball | Iowa | Iowa 9–4 |
| December 8, 2006 | Iowa City | W Swimming | Iowa | Iowa 11–4 |
| March 4, 2007 | Iowa City | W Gymnastics | Iowa State | Iowa 11–6 |
| March 23, 2007 | Ames | W Gymnastics | Iowa State | Iowa 11–8 |
| April 3, 2007 | Iowa City | Softball | Iowa | Iowa 13–8 |

=== 2007–08 Tied (2-2) ===
Iowa victories are shaded ██ gold. Iowa State victories shaded in ██ cardinal. Ties are white.

| Date | Site | Sport | Winning team | Series |
|---|---|---|---|---|
| September 4, 2007 | Cedar Rapids | M Golf | Iowa State | Iowa State 2–0 |
| September 8, 2007 | Des Moines | Volleyball | Iowa State | Iowa State 4–0 |
| September 9, 2007 | Iowa City | W Soccer | Iowa State | Iowa State 5–1 |
| September 15, 2007 | Ames | Football | Iowa State | Iowa State 8–1 |
| November 10, 2007 | Peoria | M Cross Country | Iowa State | Iowa State 10–1 |
| November 10, 2007 | Peoria | W Cross Country | Iowa | Iowa State 10–3 |
| December 5, 2007 | Ames | W Basketball | Iowa State | Iowa State 12–3 |
| December 7, 2007 | Ames | W Swimming | Iowa State | Iowa State 14–3 |
| December 8, 2007 | Ames | M Basketball | Iowa State | Iowa State 16–3 |
| December 9, 2007 | Ames | Wrestling | Iowa | Iowa State 16–5 |
| February 22, 2008 | Ames | W Gymnastics | Iowa State | Iowa State 18–5 |
| March 7, 2008 | Iowa City | W Gymnastics | Iowa | Iowa State 18–7 |
| April 1, 2008 | Ames | Softball | Iowa | Iowa State 18–9 |

=== 2008–09 Iowa (3-2) ===
Iowa victories are shaded ██ gold. Iowa State victories shaded in ██ cardinal.

| Date | Site | Sport | Winning team | Series |
|---|---|---|---|---|
| September 12, 2008 | Ames | Volleyball | Iowa State | Iowa State 2–0 |
| September 13, 2008 | Iowa City | Football | Iowa | Iowa 3–2 |
| September 21, 2008 | Ames | W Soccer | Iowa | Iowa 5–2 |
| November 15, 2008 | Stillwater | M Cross Country | Iowa State | Iowa 5–4 |
| November 15, 2008 | Stillwater | W Cross Country | Iowa | Iowa 7–4 |
| December 6, 2008 | Iowa City | Wrestling | Iowa | Iowa 9–4 |
| December 7, 2008 | Iowa City | W Basketball | Iowa | Iowa 11–4 |
| December 12, 2008 | Iowa City | M Basketball | Iowa | Iowa 13–4 |
| December 12, 2008 | Iowa City | W Swimming | Iowa | Iowa 15–4 |
| February 12, 2009 | Ames | W Gymnastics | Iowa | Iowa 17–4 |
| February 14, 2009 | Iowa City | W Gymnastics | Iowa | Iowa 19–4 |
| April 7, 2009 | Iowa City | Softball | Iowa | Iowa 21–4 |

=== 2009–10 Tied (3-3) ===
Iowa victories are shaded ██ gold. Iowa State victories shaded in ██ cardinal.

| Date | Site | Sport | Winning team | Series |
|---|---|---|---|---|
| September 11, 2009 | Iowa City | Volleyball | Iowa State | Iowa State 2–0 |
| September 12, 2009 | Ames | Football | Iowa | Iowa 3–2 |
| September 18, 2009 | Iowa City | W Soccer | Iowa | Iowa 5–2 |
| November 14, 2009 | Springfield | M Cross Country | Iowa State | Iowa 5–4 |
| November 14, 2009 | Springfield | W Cross Country | Iowa State | Iowa State 6–5 |
| December 6, 2009 | Ames | Wrestling | Iowa | Iowa 7–6 |
| December 10, 2009 | Ames | W Basketball | Iowa State | Iowa State 8–7 |
| December 11, 2009 | Ames | W Swimming | Iowa State | Iowa State 10–7 |
| December 11, 2009 | Ames | M Basketball | Iowa State | Iowa State 12–7 |
| February 21, 2010 | Iowa City | W Gymnastics | Iowa State | Iowa State 14–7 |
| February 21, 2010 | Iowa City | W Tennis | Iowa | Iowa State 14–9 |
| March 5, 2010 | Ames | W Gymnastics | Iowa | Iowa State 14–11 |
| March 31, 2010 | Ames | Softball | Iowa State | Iowa State 16–11 |

=== 2010–11 Iowa (4-3) ===
Iowa victories are shaded ██ gold. Iowa State victories shaded in ██ cardinal.

| Date | Site | Sport | Winning team | Series |
|---|---|---|---|---|
| September 10, 2010 | Iowa City | Volleyball | Iowa State | Iowa State 2–0 |
| September 11, 2010 | Iowa City | Football | Iowa | Iowa 3–2 |
| September 17, 2010 | Ames | W Soccer | Iowa | Iowa 5–2 |
| November 13, 2010 | Springfield | M Cross Country | Iowa State | Iowa 5–4 |
| November 13, 2010 | Springfield | W Cross Country | Iowa State | Iowa State 6–5 |
| December 3, 2010 | Iowa City | Wrestling | Iowa | Iowa 7–6 |
| December 9, 2010 | Iowa City | W Basketball | Iowa | Iowa 9–6 |
| December 10, 2010 | Iowa City | M Basketball | Iowa State | Iowa 9–8 |
| December 10, 2010 | Iowa City | W Swimming | Iowa | Iowa 11–8 |
| February 18, 2011 | Ames | W Gymnastics | Iowa State | Iowa 11–10 |
| February 25, 2011 | Iowa City | W Gymnastics | Iowa | Iowa 13–10 |
| April 20, 2011 | Iowa City | Softball | Iowa | Iowa 15–10 |
| May 5, 2011 | Iowa City | Academics | Iowa State | Iowa 15–11 |

=== 2011–12 Tied (4-4) ===
Iowa victories are shaded ██ gold. Iowa State victories shaded in ██ cardinal.

| Date | Site | Sport | Winning team | Series |
|---|---|---|---|---|
| September 3, 2011 | Ames | Volleyball | Iowa State | Iowa State 2–0 |
| September 9, 2011 | Iowa City | W Soccer | Iowa | Tied 2–2 |
| September 10, 2011 | Ames | Football | Iowa State | Iowa State 5–2 |
| November 12, 2011 | Dekalb | M Cross Country | Iowa State | Iowa State 7–2 |
| November 12, 2011 | Dekalb | W Cross Country | Iowa State | Iowa State 9–2 |
| December 4, 2011 | Ames | Wrestling | Iowa | Iowa State 9–4 |
| December 7, 2011 | Ames | W Basketball | Iowa State | Iowa State 11–4 |
| December 9, 2011 | Ames | W Swimming | Iowa | Iowa State 11–6 |
| December 9, 2011 | Ames | M Basketball | Iowa State | Iowa State 13–6 |
| January 27, 2012 | Ames | W Gymnastics | Iowa State | Iowa State 15–6 |
| February 12, 2012 | Iowa City | W Tennis | Iowa | Iowa State 15–8 |
| February 17, 2012 | Iowa City | W Gymnastics | Iowa | Iowa State 15–10 |
| April 18, 2012 | Ames | Softball | Iowa State | Iowa State 17–10 |
| May 5, 2012 | N/A | Academics | Iowa | Iowa State 17–11 |

=== 2012–13 Iowa (5-4) ===
Iowa victories are shaded ██ gold. Iowa State victories shaded in ██ cardinal.

| Date | Site | Sport | Winning team | Series |
|---|---|---|---|---|
| August 31, 2012 | Ames | W Soccer | Iowa | Iowa 2–0 |
| September 7, 2012 | Ames | Volleyball | Iowa State | Tied 2–2 |
| September 8, 2012 | Iowa City | Football | Iowa State | Iowa State 5–2 |
| November 9, 2012 | Springfield | M Cross Country | Iowa State | Iowa State 7–2 |
| November 9, 2012 | Springfield | W Cross Country | Iowa State | Iowa State 9–2 |
| December 1, 2012 | Iowa City | Wrestling | Iowa | Iowa State 9–4 |
| December 6, 2012 | Iowa City | W Basketball | Iowa | Iowa State 9–6 |
| December 7, 2012 | Iowa City | M Basketball | Iowa | Iowa State 9–8 |
| December 7, 2012 | Iowa City | W Swimming | Iowa | Iowa 10–9 |
| January 26, 2013 | Ames | W Tennis | Iowa | Iowa 12–9 |
| March 8, 2013 | Iowa City | W Gymnastics | Iowa | Iowa 14–9 |
| May 1, 2013 | Iowa City | Softball | Iowa | Iowa 16–9 |
| May 5, 2013 | N/A | Academics | Iowa | Iowa 17–9 |

=== 2013–14 Tied (5-5) ===
Iowa victories are shaded ██ gold. Iowa State victories shaded in ██ cardinal. Ties are white.

| Date | Site | Sport | Winning team | Series |
|---|---|---|---|---|
| September 8, 2013 | Iowa City | W Soccer | Iowa | Iowa 2–0 |
| September 14, 2013 | Ames | Football | Iowa | Iowa 5–0 |
| September 21, 2013 | Iowa City | Volleyball | Iowa State | Iowa 5–2 |
| November 15, 2013 | Ames | M Cross Country | Iowa State | Iowa 5–4 |
| November 15, 2013 | Ames | W Cross Country | Iowa State | Iowa State 6–5 |
| December 1, 2013 | Ames | Wrestling | Iowa | Iowa 7–6 |
| December 12, 2013 | Ames | W Basketball | Iowa State | Iowa State 8–7 |
| December 13, 2013 | Ames | W Swimming | Iowa | Iowa 9–8 |
| December 13, 2013 | Ames | M Basketball | Iowa State | Iowa State 10–9 |
| March 4, 2014 | N/A | Academics | Iowa | Tied 10–10 |
| March 4, 2014 | N/A | Academics | Iowa State | Iowa State 11–10 |
| March 7, 2014 | Ames | W Gymnastics | Iowa State | Iowa State 13–10 |
| April 23, 2014 | Ames | Softball | Tie | Iowa State 14–11 |

=== 2014–15 ISU (6-5) ===
Iowa victories are shaded ██ gold. Iowa State victories shaded in ██ cardinal.

| Date | Site | Sport | Winning team | Series |
|---|---|---|---|---|
| September 5, 2014 | Ames | W. Soccer | Iowa State | Iowa State 2–0 |
| September 13, 2014 | Iowa City | Football | Iowa State | Iowa State 5–0 |
| September 20, 2014 | Ames | Volleyball | Iowa State | Iowa State 7–0 |
| November 14, 2014 | Peoria, IL | W. Cross Country | Iowa State | Iowa State 9–0 |
| November 14, 2014 | Peoria, IL | M. Cross Country | Iowa State | Iowa State 11–0 |
| November 29, 2014 | Iowa City | Wrestling | Iowa | Iowa State 11–2 |
| December 1, 2014 | N/A | Academics | Iowa | Iowa State 11–3 |
| December 11, 2014 | Iowa City | W. Basketball | Iowa | Iowa State 11–5 |
| December 12, 2014 | Iowa City | W. Swimming | Iowa | Iowa State 11–7 |
| December 12, 2014 | Iowa City | M. Basketball | Iowa State | Iowa State 13–7 |
| February 6, 2015 | Iowa City | W. Tennis | Iowa | Iowa State 13–9 |
| March 6, 2015 | Iowa City | W. Gymnastics | Iowa | Iowa State 13–11 |
| April 15, 2015 | Iowa City | Softball | Iowa State | Iowa State 15–11 |

=== 2015–16 ISU (6-5-1) ===
Iowa victories are shaded ██ gold. Iowa State victories shaded in ██ cardinal.

| Date | Site | Sport | Winning team | Series |
|---|---|---|---|---|
| September 11, 2015 | Iowa City | W. Soccer | Iowa | Iowa 2–0 |
| September 11, 2015 | Iowa City | Volleyball | Iowa | Iowa 4–0 |
| September 12, 2015 | Ames | Football | Iowa | Iowa 7–0 |
| November 13, 2015 | N/A | Academics | Iowa | Iowa 8–0 |
| November 13, 2015 | Lawrence, KS | M. Cross Country | Iowa State | Iowa 8–2 |
| November 13, 2015 | Lawrence, KS | W. Cross Country | Iowa State | Iowa 8–4 |
| November 29, 2015 | Ames | Wrestling | Iowa | Iowa 10–4 |
| December 10, 2015 | Ames | M. Basketball | Iowa State | Iowa 10–6 |
| December 11, 2015 | Ames | W. Swimming | Iowa | Iowa 12–6 |
| December 11, 2015 | Ames | W. Basketball | Iowa State | Iowa 12–8 |
| March 4, 2016 | Ames | W. Gymnastics | Iowa State | Iowa 12–10 |
| May 3, 2016 | Ames | Softball | Iowa State | Tied 12–12 |

=== 2016–17 Tied (6-6-1) ===
Iowa victories are shaded ██ gold. Iowa State victories shaded in ██ cardinal. Ties are white.

| Date | Site | Sport | Winning team | Series |
|---|---|---|---|---|
| September 9, 2016 | Ames | W Soccer | Iowa | Iowa 2–0 |
| September 9, 2016 | Ames | Volleyball | Iowa State | Tied 2–2 |
| September 10, 2016 | Iowa City | Football | Iowa | Iowa 5–2 |
| November 11, 2016 | Iowa City | M Cross Country | Iowa State | Iowa 5–4 |
| November 11, 2016 | Iowa City | W Cross Country | Iowa State | Iowa State 6–5 |
| November 16, 2016 | N/A | Academics | Tied | Iowa State 7–6 |
| December 7, 2016 | Iowa City | W Basketball | Iowa | Iowa 8–7 |
| December 8, 2016 | Iowa City | M Basketball | Iowa | Iowa 10–7 |
| December 9, 2016 | Iowa City | W Swimming | Iowa | Iowa 12–7 |
| December 10, 2016 | Iowa City | Wrestling | Iowa | Iowa 14–7 |
| February 5, 2017 | Iowa City | W Tennis | Iowa | Iowa 16–7 |
| March 3, 2017 | Iowa City | W Gymnastics | Iowa | Iowa 18–7 |
| April 18, 2017 | Iowa City | Softball | Iowa | Iowa 20–7 |

=== 2017–18 ISU (7-6-1) ===
Iowa victories are shaded ██ gold. Iowa State victories shaded in ██ cardinal. Ties are white.

| Date | Site | Sport | Winning team | Series |
|---|---|---|---|---|
| August 25, 2017 | Iowa City | W Soccer | Iowa | Iowa 2–0 |
| September 8, 2017 | Iowa City | Volleyball | Iowa State | Tied 2–2 |
| September 9, 2017 | Ames | Football | Iowa | Iowa 5–2 |
| November 10, 2017 | Ames | W Cross Country | Iowa State | Iowa 5–4 |
| November 10, 2017 | Ames | M Cross Country | Iowa State | Iowa State 6–5 |
| December 6, 2017 | Ames | Women's Basketball | Iowa | Iowa 7–6 |
| December 7, 2017 | Ames | Men's Basketball | Iowa State | Iowa State 8–7 |
| December 8, 2017 | Ames | W Swimming | Iowa | Iowa 9–8 |
| February 18, 2018 | Ames | Wrestling | Iowa | Iowa 11-8 |
| March 7, 2018 | Ames | W Tennis | Iowa | Iowa 13-8 |
| March 9, 2018 | Ames | W Gymnastics | Iowa State | Iowa 13-10 |
| April 25, 2018 | Ames | Softball | Iowa State | Iowa 13-12 |
| May 16, 2018 | N/A | Academics | Iowa State | Iowa State 14-13 |

=== 2018–19 Tied (7-7-1) ===
Iowa victories are shaded ██ gold. Iowa State victories shaded in ██ cardinal. Ties are white.

| Date | Site | Sport | Winning team | Series |
|---|---|---|---|---|
| September 7, 2018 | Ames | W Soccer | Iowa State | Iowa State 2-0 |
| September 14, 2018 | Ames | Volleyball | Iowa | Tied 2-2 |
| September 8, 2018 | Iowa City | Football | Iowa | Iowa 5-2 |
| November 9, 2018 | Peoria, IL | W Cross Country | Iowa State | Iowa 5-4 |
| November 9, 2018 | Peoria, IL | M Cross Country | Iowa State | Iowa State 6-5 |
| December 1, 2018 | Iowa City | Wrestling | Iowa | Iowa 7-6 |
| December 5, 2018 | Iowa City | Women's Basketball | Iowa | Iowa 9-6 |
| December 6, 2018 | Iowa City | Men's Basketball | Iowa | Iowa 11-6 |
| December 7, 2018 | Iowa City | W Swimming | Iowa | Iowa 13-6 |
| February 8, 2019 | Iowa City | W Tennis | Iowa | Iowa 15-6 |
| March 1, 2019 | Iowa City | W Gymnastics | Iowa State | Iowa 15-8 |
| April 10, 2019 | Iowa City | Softball | Iowa State | Iowa 15-10 |

=== 2019–20 Iowa (8-7-1) ===
Iowa victories are shaded ██ gold. Iowa State victories shaded in ██ cardinal. Ties are white.

| Date | Site | Sport | Winning team | Series |
|---|---|---|---|---|
| August 29, 2019 | Iowa City | W Soccer | Iowa | Iowa 2-0 |
| September 14, 2019 | Ames (College GameDay) | Football | Iowa | Iowa 5-0 |
| September 21, 2019 | Iowa City | Volleyball | Iowa State | Iowa 5-2 |
| November 15, 2019 | Ames | W Cross Country | Iowa State | Iowa 5-4 |
| November 15, 2019 | Ames | M Cross Country | Iowa State | Iowa State 6-5 |
| November 24, 2019 | Ames | Wrestling | Iowa | Iowa 7-6 |
| December 11, 2019 | Ames | Women's Basketball | Iowa | Iowa 9-6 |
| December 12, 2019 | Ames | Men's Basketball | Iowa | Iowa 11-6 |
| December 13, 2019 | Ames | W Swimming | Iowa | Iowa 13-6 |
| February 28, 2020 | Des Moines | W Tennis | Iowa State | Iowa 13-8 |
| March 6, 2020 | Ames | W Gymnastics | Iowa | Iowa 15-8 |
| April 14, 2020 | Ames | Softball | Cancelled – COVID-19 pandemic | Iowa 15-8 |

=== 2020–21 (Cancelled COVID) ===
Series paused due to COVID pandemic.

=== 2021–22 Tied (8-8-1) ===
Iowa victories are shaded ██ gold. Iowa State victories shaded in ██ cardinal. Ties are white.

| Date | Site | Sport | Winning team | Series |
|---|---|---|---|---|
| August 26, 2021 | Iowa City | W Soccer | Iowa | Iowa 2-0 |
| September 11, 2021 | Ames (College GameDay) | Football | Iowa | Iowa 5-0 |
| September 11, 2021 | Coralville | Volleyball | Iowa | Iowa 7-0 |
| November 12, 2021 | Iowa City | W Cross Country | Iowa State | Iowa 7-2 |
| November 12, 2021 | Iowa City | M Cross Country | Iowa State | Iowa 7-4 |
| December 5, 2021 | Ames | Wrestling | Iowa | Iowa 9-4 |
| December 8, 2021 | Ames | Women's Basketball | Iowa State | Iowa 9-6 |
| December 9, 2021 | Ames | Men's Basketball | Iowa State | Iowa 9-8 |
| December 10, 2021 | Ames | W Swimming | Iowa State | Iowa State 10-9 |
| February 18, 2022 | Des Moines | W Tennis | Iowa State | Iowa State 12-9 |
| March 4, 2021 | Ames | W Gymnastics | Iowa | Iowa State 12-11 |
| April 26, 2021 | Ames | Softball | Iowa State | Iowa State 14-11 |

=== 2022–23 ISU (9-8-1) ===
Iowa victories are shaded ██ gold. Iowa State victories shaded in ██ cardinal. Ties are white.

| Date | Site | Sport | Winning team | Series |
|---|---|---|---|---|
| September 8, 2022 | Ames | W Soccer | Iowa State | Iowa State 2-0 |
| September 9, 2022 | Ames | Volleyball | Iowa State | Iowa State 4-0 |
| September 10, 2022 | Iowa City | Football | Iowa State | Iowa State 7-0 |
| November 11, 2022 | Columbia | W Cross Country | Iowa State | Iowa State 9-0 |
| November 11, 2022 | Columbia | M Cross Country | Iowa State | Iowa State 11-0 |
| December 4, 2022 | Iowa City | Wrestling | Iowa | Iowa State 11-2 |
| December 7, 2022 | Iowa City | Women's Basketball | Iowa | Iowa State 11-4 |
| December 8, 2022 | Iowa City | Men's Basketball | Iowa | Iowa State 11-6 |
| December 9, 2022 | Iowa City | Swimming | Iowa State | Iowa State 13-6 |
| February 24, 2023 | Iowa City | Tennis | Iowa State | Iowa State 15-6 |
| March 3, 2023 | Iowa City | Gymnastics | Iowa | Iowa State 15-8 |
| April 26, 2023 | Iowa City | Softball | Iowa State | Iowa State 17-8 |

=== 2023–24 Tied (9-9-1) ===
Iowa victories are shaded ██ gold. Iowa State victories shaded in ██ cardinal. Ties are white.

| Date | Site | Sport | Winning team | Series |
|---|---|---|---|---|
| August 24, 2023 | Iowa City | W Soccer | Iowa | Iowa 2-0 |
| September 6, 2023 | Iowa City | Volleyball | Iowa State | Tied 2-2 |
| September 9, 2023 | Ames | Football | Iowa | Iowa 5-2 |
| November 10, 2023 | Stillwater | W Cross Country | Iowa State | Iowa 5-4 |
| November 10, 2023 | Stillwater | M Cross Country | Iowa State | Iowa State 6-5 |
| November 26, 2023 | Ames | Wrestling | Iowa | Iowa 7-6 |
| December 6, 2023 | Ames | Women's Basketball | Iowa | Iowa 9-6 |
| December 7, 2023 | Ames | Men's Basketball | Iowa State | Iowa 9-8 |
| December 8, 2023 | Ames | Swimming | Iowa | Iowa 11-8 |
| February 16, 2024 | Ames | Tennis | Iowa | Iowa 13-8 |
| March 8, 2024 | Ames | Gymnastics | Iowa | Iowa 15-8 |
| April 16, 2024 | Ames | Softball | Cancelled – Inclement weather | Iowa 15-8 |

=== 2024–25 ISU (10-9-1) ===
Iowa victories are shaded ██ gold. Iowa State victories shaded in ██ cardinal. Ties are white.

| Date | Site | Sport | Winning team | Series |
|---|---|---|---|---|
| September 7, 2024 | Iowa City | Football | Iowa State | Iowa State 3-0 |
| September 11, 2024 | Ames | Volleyball | Iowa State | Iowa State 5-0 |
| September 15, 2024 | Iowa City | W Soccer | Iowa | Iowa State 5-2 |
| November 15, 2024 | Peoria | W Cross Country | Iowa State | Iowa State 7-2 |
| November 15, 2024 | Peoria | M Cross Country | Iowa State | Iowa State 9-2 |
| November 23, 2024 | Iowa City | Wrestling | Iowa | Iowa State 9-4 |
| December 11, 2024 | Iowa City | Women's Basketball | Iowa | Iowa State 9-6 |
| December 12, 2024 | Iowa City | Men's Basketball | Iowa State | Iowa State 11-6 |
| December 13, 2024 | Iowa City | Swimming | Iowa | Iowa State 11-8 |
| February 5, 2025 | Iowa City | Tennis | Iowa State | Iowa State 13-8 |
| March 7, 2025 | Iowa City | Gymnastics | Iowa | Iowa State 13-10 |
| April 15 / 29, 2025 | Ames | Softball | Tie | Iowa State 14-11 |

=== 2025–26 ISU (11-9-1) ===
Iowa victories are shaded ██ gold. Iowa State victories shaded in ██ cardinal. Ties are white.

| Date | Site | Sport | Winning team | Series |
|---|---|---|---|---|
| September 4, 2025 | Iowa City | Women's Soccer | Iowa | Iowa 2-0 |
| September 6, 2025 | Ames (Big Noon Kickoff) | Football | Iowa State | Iowa State 3-2 |
| September 17, 2025 | Coralville | Volleyball | Iowa State | Iowa State 5-2 |
| November 14, 2025 | Stillwater | W Cross Country | Iowa State | Iowa State 7-2 |
| November 14, 2025 | Stillwater | M Cross Country | Iowa State | Iowa State 9-2 |
| November 30, 2025 | Ames | Wrestling | Iowa State | Iowa State 11-2 |
| December 10, 2025 | Ames | Women's Basketball | Iowa State | Iowa State 13-2 |
| December 11, 2025 | Ames | Men's Basketball | Iowa State | Iowa State 15-2 |
| January 31, 2026 | Ames | Swimming | Iowa | Iowa State 15-4 |
| February 15, 2026 | Ames | Tennis | Iowa | Iowa State 15-6 |
| March 13, 2026 | Ames | Gymnastics | Cancelled – ISU program discontinued | Iowa State 15-6 |
| April 8 / 21, 2026 | Iowa City / Ames | Softball | Tie | Iowa State 16-7 |

=== 2026–27 ===
Iowa victories are shaded ██ gold. Iowa State victories shaded in ██ cardinal. Ties are white.

| Date | Site | Sport | Winning team | Series |
|---|---|---|---|---|
| August 27, 2026 | Ames | Women's Soccer | Iowa | Iowa 2-0 |
| September 8, 2026 | Ames | Volleyball | Iowa | Iowa 4-0 |
| September 12, 2026 | Iowa City | Football | Iowa | Iowa 7-0 |
| November 13, 2026 | Ames | W Cross Country | Iowa State | Iowa 7-2 |
| November 13, 2026 | Ames | M Cross Country | Iowa State | Iowa 7-4 |
| November 22, 2026 | Iowa City | Wrestling | Iowa | Iowa 9-4 |
| December 9, 2026 | Iowa City | Women's Basketball | | |
| December 10, 2026 | Iowa City | Men's Basketball | | |
| January 30, 2027 | Iowa City | Swimming | | |
| February 14, 2026 | Iowa City | Tennis | | |
| April 6 / 20, 2026 | Ames / Iowa City | Softball | | |

== See also ==
- Cy-Hawk Trophy, for the winner in football
