= 2004 Women's National Invitation Tournament =

College basketball postseason tournament

- Teams: 32
- Finals site: Omaha Civic Auditorium, Omaha, Nebraska
- Champions: Creighton (1st title)
- Runner-up: UNLV (1st title game)
- Semifinalists: Richmond; Iowa State
- Winning coach: Jim Flanery (1st title)
- MVP: Christy Neneman (Creighton)
- Attendance: 4,180 (championship game)

The 2004 Women's National Invitation Tournament was a single-elimination tournament of 32 NCAA Division I teams that were not selected to participate in the 2004 Women's NCAA tournament. It was the seventh edition of the postseason Women's National Invitation Tournament.

In one semifinal of the tournament, Creighton faced Richmond, played at Omaha Civic Auditorium. The other semifinal game featured UNLV against Iowa State. Creighton defeated Richmond 81–72 behind Dayna Finch's 24 points and a 16 point, 9 rebound and 8 assist performance by Christy Neneman, flirting with a triple double. Meanwhile, UNLV defeated Iowa State 65–59. UNLV was down by double digits 47–37 midway through the second half, but overcame the deficit to take a lead with just under a minute remaining, then hitting five of six free throws in the final 32 seconds to win the game.

The final pitted Creighton and UNLV against each other in Omaha, Nebraska at the Omaha Civic Auditorium. Creighton dominated the title game from the very beginning, outscoring the Lady Rebels early to take a 17–4 lead. UNLV briefly cut the lead to single digits early in the second half but the Blue Jays went on a 10–2 run to retake a commanding lead. They later had a 13–0 run to put the game out of reach and gave the coach the opportunity to play all the bench players.

== Bracket ==
=== Region 1 ===
*Host • Source

March 17–19
Pepperdine	59
Washington*	71
Colorado State*	68
Creighton	79
Drake	60
Nebraska*	73
Oregon State*	64
Gonzaga	69

March 19–22
Washington*	69
Creighton	74
Nebraska*	67
Oregon State	75

March 24–25
Creighton*	74
Oregon State	64

=== Region 2 ===
*Host • Source

March 17–19
Louisville*	61
Western Michigan	63
Charlotte	78
Clemson*	71
South Florida	55
Richmond*	63
Florida State	67
South Alabama*	61

March 19–22
Western Michigan*	85 OT
Charlotte	83
Richmond*	84
Florida State	77

March 24–25
Richmond	63
Western Michigan*	57

=== Region 3 ===
*Host • Source

March 17–19
Idaho State	59
Iowa State*	72
Miami (Ohio)*	77
Xavier	65
George Mason	56
Seton Hall*	61
Kent State	51
Saint Joseph's*	61

March 19–22
Iowa State*	71
Miami (Ohio)	57
Seton Hall	61
Saint Joseph's*	68 OT

March 24–25
Iowa State*	66
Saint Joseph's	58

=== Region 4 ===
*Host • Source

March 17–19
Cincinnati	78
Western Kentucky*	80 OT
Tulsa	64
Memphis*	66
Rice	59
Arkansas State*	52
Arizona State	47
UNLV*	50

March 19–22
Western Kentucky*	104
Memphis	87
Rice	66
UNLV*	68

March 24–25
Western Kentucky	75
UNLV*	78

=== Semifinals and championship game ===
WNIT Semifinals; March 26–28
Creighton*	81
Richmond	72
UNLV	65
Iowa State*	59

WNIT Championship Game; March 31, 2005
Creighton*	73
UNLV	52

== See also ==
- 2004 National Invitation Tournament
