= Bruce Rasmussen (basketball) =

Biographical details
- Born: September 29, 1950 (age 76); Webster City, Iowa, U.S.
- Education: Northern Iowa

Coaching career (HC unless noted)
- 1980–1992: Creighton (women's)

Administrative career (AD unless noted)
- 1994–2021: Creighton

Head coaching record
- Overall: 196–147 (.571)

Bruce Rasmussen (born September 29, 1950) was the director of athletics at Creighton University. He was the head coach of the Creighton Bluejays women's basketball team from 1980 to 1992. From 1992 to 1994, he served as the associate athletics director, before being named the athletics director in 1994. He presided over the NCAA Men’s Basketball Committee in 2018.

== Career ==
Rasmussen graduated from the University of Northern Iowa in 1971.

== Legacy ==
The Rasmussen Fitness and Sports Center, which opened in October 2012, is named after Bruce Rasmussen. Inducted in 2008, he is a member of the Omaha Sports Hall of Fame. In 2014, he was named Under Armour Athletic Director of the Year.
