= 2009 Women's National Invitation Tournament =

College basketball postseason tournament

- Teams: 48
- Finals site: Allen Fieldhouse, Lawrence, Kansas
- Champions: South Florida (1st title)
- Runner-up: Kansas (1st title game)
- Semifinalists: Illinois State; Boston College
- Winning coach: Jose Fernandez (1st title)
- MVP: Shantia Grace (South Florida)
- Attendance: 16,113 (championship game)
- Top scorer: Danielle McCray (Kansas) (147 points)

The 2009 Women's National Invitation Tournament (WNIT) was a single-elimination tournament of 48 National Collegiate Athletic Association (NCAA) Division I teams that did not participate in the 2009 NCAA Division I women's basketball tournament. It was won by South Florida. The 41st annual tournament was played from March 18, 2009 to April 4, 2009, entirely on campus sites. The highest ranked team in each conference that did not receive a bid to the NCAA Tournament received an automatic bid to this tournament. The remaining slots were filled by the WNIT Selection Committee.

The South Florida Bulls beat the Kansas Jayhawks, 75–71, in the championship game to win the WNIT. This was the first postseason championship of any kind for the Bulls women's basketball team. Danielle McCray of Kansas scored 147 points during the tournament, a WNIT record that still stands. Shantia Grace of South Florida was named tournament MVP.

== Seeding ==
Teams are not seeded in the WNIT. Rather, teams are placed into one of three tiers. Teams in the upper tier are spread around the bracket as best as possible, although not every upper tier team receives a first round bye. Lower tier and middle tier teams tend to meet in the first round, while upper tier teams will usually play winners of first-round games in the second round. The organizers attempt to bracket the first two rounds based on geography. The location of games is determined in part by seed, but also by facility availability and other factors.

== Participants ==
=== Sections ===
Section 1
School	Conference	Record	Berth type
Oregon State	Pac-10	19–11	Automatic
Nebraska	Big 12	15–15	At-Large
Arkansas	SEC	17–13	Automatic
Kansas	Big 12	18–13	Automatic
Portland	WCC	17–13	Automatic
Portland State	Big Sky	22–9	Automatic
Southern	SWAC	16–13	Automatic
New Mexico	MWC	22–10	Automatic
Texas-Arlington	Southland	22–10	Automatic
Oklahoma State	Big 12	16–15	At-Large
UC Riverside	Big West	19–11	Automatic
Creighton	MVC	21–11	At-Large

Section 3
School	Conference	Record	Berth type
Boston College	ACC	20–11	Automatic
Hartford	America East	20–11	At-Large
Wake Forest	ACC	19–11	At-Large
Richmond	A-10	23–9	Automatic
Central Connecticut	Northeast	18–13	Automatic
Boston	America East	24–7	Automatic
Harvard	Ivy League	19–9	Automatic
St. John's	Big East	17–14	At-Large
Winthrop	Big South	16–15	Automatic
Georgetown	Big East	17–13	At-Large
American	Patriot	19–11	Automatic
James Madison	CAA	23–9	Automatic

Section 2
School	Conference	Record	Berth type
Marquette	Big East	16–15	At-Large
Illinois State	MVC	24–7	Automatic
Indiana	Big Ten	19–10	Automatic
Bowling Green	MAC	28–4	Automatic
Butler	Horizon	19–11	Automatic
Duquesne	A-10	20–11	At-Large
Southern Methodist	C-USA	20–11	Automatic
Louisiana Tech	WAC	20–12	Automatic
Dayton	A-10	20–13	At-Large
Oakland	Summit	26–6	Automatic
Canisius	MAAC	24–8	Automatic
Syracuse	Big East	16–14	At-Large

Section 4
School	Conference	Record	Berth type
St. Bonaventure	A-10	21–10	At-Large
Wisconsin	Big Ten	18–14	At-Large
South Florida	Big East	22–10	Automatic
Mississippi	SEC	17–14	At-Large
Coppin State	MEAC	14–14	Automatic
West Virginia	Big East	17–14	At-Large
Chattanooga	SoCon	22–9	Automatic
Kentucky	SEC	15–15	At-Large
George Washington	A-10	17–13	At-Large
Florida Gulf Coast	A-Sun	25–4	Automatic
Murray State	OVC	22–8	Automatic
Arkansas-Little Rock	Sun Belt	26–6	Automatic

== Final Four ==
Kansas took on Illinois State in the first semifinal, held at Allen Fieldhouse. The first half was a back-and-forth battle, featuring three ties and nine lead changes. Kansas held a small six point lead at halftime. In the second half Kansas appeared to take charge, opening up a 17 point lead 48–31 with just over 13 minutes to go. The Redbirds did not go away, and chipped away at the lead, cutting it to single digits just after midway through the half, and down to a single point with three seconds to go in the game. With two seconds left, Danielle McCray was fouled and went to the line eating both free throws. Illinois State needed a three pointer to tie but turned it over with one second left in the game, leaving Kansas to take the win and head to the championship game. McCray led all scorers with 31 points.

South Florida took on Boston College in the other semifinal, held in Conte Forum in Chestnut Hill, Massachusetts. The game was very close for the first three quarters of the game with neither team holding more than a six point lead. Boston College hit a three-point jumper to make it a one point game midway through the second half, but did not score another field goal for over six minutes, allowing the Bulls to open up a 15 point lead. South Florida ended up with the win 82–65. Carolyn Swords led all scorers with 22 points in the losing effort, while Jasmine Wynne finished with 19 points for the Bulls.

South Florida faced Kansas in the championship game held at Allen Fieldhouse. The attendance was 16,113, representing not just a Kansas record but the largest home attendance for a women's game in Big 12 history. the Bulls opened up an early 10 point lead, but Kansas responded by taking back a small lead late in the first half. South Florida held Kansas scoreless for a four minute stretch allowing them to open up a 12 point lead early in the second half. Kansas cut the lead briefly to five points before the Bulls open the lead back up to double digits. The Jayhawks then held the Bulls scoreless for nearly three minutes and cut the lead to 67–66. The Bulls hit a bucket and a free throw to extend their lead to four, then Kansas turned it over when attempting to cut into the lead. South Florida ran out much of the remaining time and hit a shot from baseline to increase the margin to five points with less than 30 seconds to play. The Bulls ended up winning the championship 75–71. It was the first postseason championship for South Florida. Danielle McCray led all scorers with 24 points for Kansas.

== Bracket ==
All times US EDT † – Denotes overtime period

=== Section 1 ===
Round 1 March 18–20
Portland	51
Portland State*	57
Southern	44
New Mexico*	72
Texas-Arlington	72
Oklahoma State*	82
UC Riverside	51
Creighton*	64

Round 2 March 21–24
Oregon State*	59
Portland State	47
Nebraska*	43
New Mexico	54
Arkansas*	61†
Oklahoma State	60
Kansas*	79
Creighton	64

Round 3 March 25–27
Oregon State	56
New Mexico*	61
Arkansas	59
Kansas*	75

Quarterfinals; March 28–30
New Mexico*	69
Kansas	78

Note: Asterisk denotes home team. † denotes overtime.

=== Section 2 ===
Round 1 March 18–20
Butler	59
Duquesne*	58
Southern Methodist	54
Louisiana Tech*	77
Dayton	70
Oakland*	55
Canisius	65
Syracuse	90

Round 2 March 21–24
Marquette*	58
Butler	49
Illinois State*	73
Louisiana Tech	59
Indiana*	59
Dayton	57
Bowling Green*	72
Syracuse	69

Round 3 March 25–27
Marquette	50
Illinois State*	51
Indiana	75
Bowling Green*	67

Quarterfinals; March 28–30
Illinois State*	66
Indiana	55

Note: Asterisk denotes home team. † denotes overtime.

=== Section 3 ===
Round 1 March 18–20
Central Connecticut	60
Boston University*	79
Harvard	60
St. John's*	83
Winthrop	45
Georgetown*	73
American	59
James Madison*	61

Round 2 March 21–24
Boston College*	68
Boston University	53
Hartford*	59
St. John's	70
Wake Forest*	61
Georgetown	72
Richmond*	59
James Madison	57

Round 3 March 25–27
Boston College	68
St. John's*	64
Georgetown*	65
Richmond	49

Quarterfinals; March 28–30
Boston College*	65
Georgetown	56

Note: Asterisk denotes home team. † denotes overtime.

=== Section 4 ===
Round 1 March 18–20
Coppin State	40
West Virginia*	70
Chattanooga	76
Kentucky*	81†
George Washington	94
Florida Gulf Coast*	97†
Murray State	67
Arkansas-Little Rock*	65

Round 2 March 21–24
St. Bonaventure*	68
West Virginia	63
Wisconsin*	49
Kentucky	45
South Florida*	88 †
Florida Gulf Coast	81
Mississippi*	87
Murray State	49

Round 3 March 25–27
St. Bonaventure	56
Wisconsin*	51
South Florida*	74
Mississippi	57

Quarterfinals; March 28–30
St. Bonaventure*	66
South Florida	80

Note: Asterisk denotes home team. † denotes overtime

=== Semifinals and finals ===
Semifinals; April 1
Kansas*	75
Illinois State	72
Boston College*	65
South Florida	82

Finals; April 4
Kansas*	71
South Florida	75

Note: Asterisk denotes home team

== See also ==
- 2009 National Invitation Tournament
