= 2009 SEC women's basketball tournament =

American college basketball postseason tournament

- Classification: Division I
- Teams: 12
- Site: Alltel Arena; North Little Rock, Arkansas
- Champions: Vanderbilt (6th title)
- Winning coach: Melanie Balcomb (3rd title)
- MVP: Christina Wirth (Vanderbilt)
- Attendance: 24,777

2008–09 SEC women's basketball standings
	Conf.				Overall
Team	W		L	PCT	W		L	PCT
No. 8 Auburn	12	–	2	.857	30	–	4	.882
No. 14 Vanderbilt^{†}	10	–	4	.714	26	–	9	.743
LSU	10	–	4	.714	19	–	11	.633
No. 22 Florida	9	–	5	.643	24	–	8	.750
No. 18 Tennessee	9	–	5	.643	22	–	11	.667
Mississippi State	8	–	6	.571	23	–	10	.697
Georgia	7	–	7	.500	18	–	14	.563
Arkansas	6	–	8	.429	18	–	14	.563
Ole Miss	5	–	9	.357	18	–	15	.545
Kentucky	5	–	9	.357	16	–	16	.500
South Carolina	2	–	12	.143	10	–	18	.357
Alabama	1	–	13	.071	13	–	17	.433
† 2009 SEC tournament winner Rankings from AP poll

The 2009 SEC Women's Basketball Tournament took place on March 5–8, 2009 in North Little Rock, Arkansas at Alltel Arena.

Vanderbilt won the tournament and with it the SEC's automatic bid to the 2009 NCAA tournament. In the final, they upset top seed Auburn for the second time in three weeks; the Commodores were responsible for two of the Tigers' three losses going into the NCAA tournament.

== Tournament ==
First Round
9	Ole Miss	65
8	Arkansas	60
12	Alabama	49
5	Tennessee	68
11	South Carolina	39
6	Mississippi State	49
10	Kentucky	64
7	Georgia	82

Second Round
9	Ole Miss	65
1	Auburn	71
5	Tennessee	71
4	Florida	67
6	Mississippi State	58
3	LSU	63
7	Georgia	61
2	Vanderbilt	69

Semi-Finals
1	Auburn	80
5	Tennessee	58
3	LSU	47
2	Vanderbilt	61

Finals
1	Auburn	54
2	Vanderbilt	61

Asterisk denotes game ended in overtime.

== All-Tournament Team ==
- Christina Wirth, G-F, Vanderbilt (MVP)
- DeWanna Bonner, G-F, Auburn
- Whitney Boddie, G, Auburn
- Angie Bjorklund, G-F, Tennessee
- Jennifer Risper, G, Vanderbilt
