= 2008–09 Vanderbilt Commodores women's basketball team =

Intercollegiate basketball season

2008–09 Vanderbilt Commodores women's basketball

SEC Tournament Champions

NCAA women's Division I tournament, Sweet Sixteen
- Conference: Southeast Conference

Ranking
- Coaches: No. 8
- Record: 26-9 ( SEC)
- Head coach: Melanie Balcomb
- Assistant coaches: Vicky Picott; Kim Rosamond
- Home arena: Memorial Gymnasium

2008–09 SEC women's basketball standings
	Conf.				Overall
Team	W		L	PCT	W		L	PCT
No. 8 Auburn	12	–	2	.857	30	–	4	.882
No. 14 Vanderbilt^{†}	10	–	4	.714	26	–	9	.743
LSU	10	–	4	.714	19	–	11	.633
No. 22 Florida	9	–	5	.643	24	–	8	.750
No. 18 Tennessee	9	–	5	.643	22	–	11	.667
Mississippi State	8	–	6	.571	23	–	10	.697
Georgia	7	–	7	.500	18	–	14	.563
Arkansas	6	–	8	.429	18	–	14	.563
Ole Miss	5	–	9	.357	18	–	15	.545
Kentucky	5	–	9	.357	16	–	16	.500
South Carolina	2	–	12	.143	10	–	18	.357
Alabama	1	–	13	.071	13	–	17	.433
† 2009 SEC tournament winner Rankings from AP poll

The 2008–09 Vanderbilt Commodores women's basketball team represented Vanderbilt University in the 2008–09 NCAA Division I basketball season. The Commodores were a member of the Southeast Conference and competed in the Sweet Sixteen at the NCAA Tournament. This was the Commodores' 14th appearance in the NCAA Sweet 16 after earning their sixth Southeastern Conference Tournament championship.

== Exhibition ==
Date	Location	Opponent	Commodores points	Opp. points	Record
Nov. 2/08	Nashville	Tusculum	98	40	1-0
Nov. 7/08	Nashville	Love & Basketball	83	74	2-0

== Regular season ==
- February 15: The Commodores wore pink jerseys to commemorate North Carolina State head coach Kay Yow. Christina Wirth scored 21 points to lead five players in double figures as the Commodores defeated Georgia 80-64. The other players in double figures were Merideth Marsh, who had 18 points, while Jennifer Risper, Hannah Tuomi and Tia Gibbs each had 10. Danielle Taylor led Georgia with 20 points in 32 minutes off the bench. Angel Robinson added 17. Vanderbilt used a 17-3 second-half run to take the lead for good. The score was tied 47-47 when Wirth made a jump shot as Marsh was fouled away from the ball. Marsh made both free throws to complete the four-point sequence and then scored the final five points of the run with a layup and three free throws.

=== Roster ===
Number	Name	Height	Position	Class
11	Ashlee Bridge	5-11	Guard/forward	Junior
12	Jordan Coleman	5-11	Forward	Freshman
5	Lauren Lueders	5-8	Guard	Junior
23	Merideth Marsh	5-6	Guard	Junior
20	Jessica Mooney	5-8	Guard	Junior
4	Angela Puleo	5-9	Guard	Sophomore
22	Jence Rhoads	5-11	Guard	Sophomore
2	Jennifer Risper	5-9	Guard	Senior
33	Rebecca Silinski	6-3	Forward	Sophomore
15	Hannah Tuomi	6-1	Forward	Sophomore
34	Christina Wirth	6-1	Forward	Senior

=== Schedule ===
Date	Location	Opponent	Commodores points	Opp. points	Record
Nov. 14/08	Nashville	Texas A&M Corpus Christi	85	51	1-0
Nov. 16/08	Bowling Green, KY	Western Kentucky	90	72	2-0
Nov. 19/08	Nashville	Eastern Kentucky	80	38	3-0
Nov. 21/08	Johnson City, TN	East Tennessee State	66	55	4-0
Nov. 23/08	Ann Arbor, MI	Michigan	42	50	4-1
Nov. 28/08	Nashville	Davidson	82	50	5-1
Nov. 29/08	Nashville	Virginia Tech	72	43	6-1
Dec. 2/08	Nashville	Radford	78	41	7-1
Dec. 4/08	Fullerton, CA	Cal-State Fullerton	83	67	8-1
Dec. 6/08	Riverside, CA	UC Riverside	47	50	8-2
Dec. 19/08	Nashville	Tennessee State	98	82	9-2
Dec. 21/08	Nashville	Tennessee-Martin	86	29	10-2
Dec. 22/08	Nashville	Liberty	67	50	11-2
Dec. 30/08	Nashville	Notre Dame	57	59	12-2
Jan. 3/09	Ames, Iowa	Iowa State	51	55	11-3
Jan. 8/09	Tuscaloosa, AL	Alabama	85	76	12-3
Jan. 11/09	Nashville	Tennessee Lady Vols	74	58	13-3
Jan. 18/09	Nashville	LSU	75	67	14-3
Jan. 22/09	Athens, GA	Georgia	55	66	
Jan. 25/09	Columbia, SC	South Carolina	66	56	
Jan. 29/09	Nashville	Arkansas	72	61	
Feb. 1/09	Nashville	Alabama	88	64	
Feb. 5/09	Starkville, MS	Mississippi State	61	66	
Feb. 8/09	Lexington, KY	Kentucky	72	62	
Feb. 12/09	Nashville	Florida	84	68	
Feb. 15/09	Nashville	Georgia	80	64	

== Player stats ==
Player	Games played	Minutes	Field goals	Three pointers	Free throws	Rebounds	Assists	Blocks	Steals	Points
Christina Wirth	35	1176	212	80	78	198	74	8	52	582
Hannah Tuomi	28	682	143	0	34	166	27	5	25	320
Merideth Marsh	35	1122	124	81	45	86	62	0	30	374
Jennifer Risper	35	1031	117	0	92	199	99	4	81	326
Jessica Mooney	35	704	88	14	59	79	83	17	50	249
Jence Rhoads	35	1028	84	1	52	81	132	12	42	221
Tia Gibbs	29	372	52	24	19	71	17	3	23	147
Chanel Chisholm	34	387	64	0	43	100	14	8	35	171
Lauren Lueders	24	186	21	14	5	31	26	1	11	61
Jordan Coleman	19	108	10	0	9	32	1	0	2	29
Ashlee Bridge	14	92	4	0	9	16	3	3	2	17
Rebecca Silinski	8	30	3	0	1	5	0	0	1	7
Amy Malo	19	107	4	0	4	16	4	6	1	12

== Postseason ==
=== SEC Tournament ===
- Vanderbilt 69, Georgia 61
- Vanderbilt 61, LSU 47
- Vanderbilt 61, Auburn 54

March 8: The Commodores earned the SEC Tournament crown for the sixth time in school history. In the championship game, Christina Wirth scored 20 points, and the Commodores (No. 23 ESPN/USA Today, No. 22 AP) beat Auburn (No. 5 ESPN/USA Today, No. 6 AP) 61-54 to win the Southeastern Conference tournament.

Vanderbilt (24-8) defeated the Tigers (29-3) for the second time in three weeks to win the SEC tournament. Vanderbilt also extended its winning streak over Auburn to 15. Auburn star DeWanna Bonner was held to nine points after scoring a combined 58 in her first two games of the tournament. Whitney Boddie led the Tigers with 14 points and eight assists.

This was the 10th straight year in which the No. 1 seed failed to win the SEC tournament. Wirth was named the tournament's most valuable player, while Jennifer Risper also made the all-tournament squad. Vanderbilt had the second-most SEC tournament titles of any program, trailing only Tennessee's 13.

=== NCAA basketball tournament ===
Seeding in brackets

- Raleigh Regional - Raleigh, NC
  - Vanderbilt (4) 73, Western Carolina (13) 44
  - Vanderbilt 74, Kansas State (5) 61
  - Maryland (1) 78, Vanderbilt 74

== Awards and honors ==
- Christina Wirth, All-Senior All-America First Team by the Lowe's Senior CLASS Award committee
- Christina Wirth, All-SEC Honors
- Christina Wirth, SEC Tournament Most Valuable Player
- Christina Wirth, SEC All-Tournament Team
- Christina Wirth, 2008-09 Vanderbilt Women's Co-Athlete of the Year
- Christina Wirth received honorable mention on the 2009 State Farm Coaches' All-America Team.
- Jennifer Risper, SEC All-Tournament Team
- Jennifer Risper, 2008-09 Vanderbilt Women's Co-Athlete of the Year
- The Women's Basketball Coaches Association (WBCA) selected Vanderbilt's Jennifer Risper as the WBCA National Defensive Player of the Year.

== Team players drafted into the WNBA ==
Round	Pick	Player	WNBA club
2	19	Christina Wirth	Indiana Fever
3	29	Jennifer Risper	Chicago Sky

== See also ==
- 2008–09 Vanderbilt Commodores men's basketball team
