= 2008–09 Auburn Tigers women's basketball team =

American college basketball season

2008–09 Auburn Tigers women's basketball

Florida International Tournament champions Miami Christmas Tournament champions Regular season SEC Champions

2009 NCAA Division I women's basketball tournament, second round
- Conference: Southeast Conference

Ranking
- Coaches: No. 13
- Record: 30–4 (12–2 SEC)
- Head coach: Nell Fortner
- Assistant coaches: Kerry Cremeans; Mark Simons; Ayesha Whitfield

2008–09 SEC women's basketball standings
	Conf.				Overall
Team	W		L	PCT	W		L	PCT
No. 8 Auburn	12	–	2	.857	30	–	4	.882
No. 14 Vanderbilt^{†}	10	–	4	.714	26	–	9	.743
LSU	10	–	4	.714	19	–	11	.633
No. 22 Florida	9	–	5	.643	24	–	8	.750
No. 18 Tennessee	9	–	5	.643	22	–	11	.667
Mississippi State	8	–	6	.571	23	–	10	.697
Georgia	7	–	7	.500	18	–	14	.563
Arkansas	6	–	8	.429	18	–	14	.563
Ole Miss	5	–	9	.357	18	–	15	.545
Kentucky	5	–	9	.357	16	–	16	.500
South Carolina	2	–	12	.143	10	–	18	.357
Alabama	1	–	13	.071	13	–	17	.433
† 2009 SEC tournament winner Rankings from AP poll

The 2008–09 Auburn Tigers women's basketball team represented Auburn University in the 2008–09 NCAA Division I basketball season. The Tigers were coached by Nell Fortner. The Tigers were a member of the Southeast Conference and won the regular season SEC title.

== Exhibition ==
Date	Location	Opponent	Tigers points	Opp. points	Record
Nov. 9/08	Auburn, AL	Anderson, S.C.	103	37	1-0

== Regular season ==
- November 14: DeWanna Bonner tallied 25 points, eight rebounds and six steals as the Tigers defeated Alabama A&M 91-53 in its season opener in Huntsville, Alabama. The Tigers shot 50 percent from the field and forced 37 Bulldog turnovers in the win. Five Auburn players finished in double-digit scoring while also posting a 50-31 rebounding advantage.
- November 19: Auburn senior Sherell Hobbs scored the 1,000th point of her career as the Tigers cruised to a 71-45 win against Georgia Southern in Statesboro, Ga. Auburn improved to 3-0 on the season and the start is the third in a row for the Auburn women's basketball team under Nell Fortner.
- November 30: Alli Smalley scored 21 points as Auburn picked up a 63-52 win against Florida International to win the FIU Thanksgiving Classic tournament title. Averaging 15 points in the two tournament games, Smalley was named its MVP.
- December 30: The Tigers (14-0) downed Miami (9-4), 68-53, to win the Miami Holiday Tournament. The tournament win is the second of the season as Auburn also won the Florida International Thanksgiving Classic. Auburn trailed at the half for just the second time this season, going into the locker room at halftime down 32-30. The Tigers managed to put together a 38-21 second half en route to the 15-point win. Senior Whitney Boddie was named tournament MVP.
- January 25: DeWanna Bonner posted a career-high 35 points and nine rebounds as Auburn defeated defending national champion Tennessee 82-68. The crowd of 12,067 shattered the previous attendance record of 7,150 that dated back to Jan. 6, 1989. The Auburn win was the first over Tennessee since March 2, 1997, when the Tigers defeated the Lady Vols, 61-59, in the SEC Tournament semifinals. The victory is also the largest ever for Auburn over Tennessee with the previous high an eight-point win (67-59) on Jan. 7, 1989 in Auburn.

== Roster ==
2008–09 Auburn Tigers women's basketball team
Players
Coaches

Pos.	#	Name	Height	Year	Previous school	Hometown
F	1	Trevesha Jackson	6 ft 0 in (1.83 m)	Sr	Auburn HS; Gulf Coast CC	Auburn, AL (United States) (Alabama)
G	2	Morgan Jennings	5 ft 8 in (1.73 m)	Fr	Douglass HS	Atlanta, GA (United States) (Georgia (U.S. state))
G	4	Parrisha Simmons	6 ft 0 in (1.83 m)	Fr	Southwest-Macon HS	Macon, GA (United States) (Georgia (U.S. state))
G	5	Alli Smalley	5 ft 8 in (1.73 m)	So	Arab HS	Arab, AL (United States) (Alabama)
G	12	Sherell Hobbs	5 ft 11 in (1.8 m)	Sr	J.O. Johnson HS	Huntsville, AL (United States) (Alabama)
F	21	Jordan Greenleaf	6 ft 1 in (1.85 m)	Jr	Morrow HS	Morrow, GA (United States) (Georgia (U.S. state))
G	22	Reneisha Hobbs	5 ft 10 in (1.78 m)	RS So	J.O. Johnson HS	Huntsville, AL (United States) (Alabama)
F/C	23	Chantel Hilliard	6 ft 2 in (1.88 m)	Fr	St. Martin HS	Biloxi, MS (United States) (Mississippi)
G	24	DeWanna Bonner	6 ft 4 in (1.93 m)	Sr	Fairfield HS	Fairfield, AL (United States) (Alabama)
C	33	Keke Carrier	6 ft 7 in (2.01 m)	RS Jr	LaGrange HS	Lake Charles, LA (United States) (Louisiana)
G	44	Whitney Boddie	5 ft 9 in (1.75 m)	Sr	Florence HS	Florence, AL (United States) (Alabama)

Head coach

- Nell Fortner (Texas)

Assistant coach(es)

- Kelly Cremeans (Florida)
- Mark Simons (Aquinas (MI))
- Ayesha Whitfield (Minnesota)

Legend

- (C) Team captain
- (S) Suspended
- (I) Ineligible
- (W) Walk-on
- Injured
- Current redshirt

=== Schedule ===
Date	Location	Opponent	Tigers points	Opp. points	Record
Nov. 14/08	Huntsville, AL	Alabama A&M	91	53	1-0
Nov. 17/08	Auburn	Temple	95	76	2-0
Nov. 19/08	Statesboro, GA	Georgia Southern	71	45	3-0
Nov. 23/08	Auburn	Ohio State	87	80	4-0
Nov. 26/08	Birmingham, AL	UAB	91	62	5-0
Nov. 29/08	Miami, FL	North Carolina State	66	51	6-0
Nov. 30/08	Miami, FL	Florida International	63	52	7-0
Dec. 3/08	Auburn	North Carolina A&T	95	74	8-0
Dec. 5/08	Auburn	Sam Houston State	119	54	9-0
Dec. 7/08	Lynchburg, VA	Liberty	64	53	10-0
Dec. 19/08	Washington, DC	George Washington	65	51	11-0
Dec. 21/08	Baltimore, MD	Coppin State	74	46	12-0
Dec. 29/08	Miami, FL	Duquesne	87	67	13-0
Dec. 30/08	Miami, FL	Miami	68	53	14-0
Jan. 3/09	Auburn	Stephen F. Austin	79	56	15-0
Jan. 8/09	Columbia, SC	South Carolina	80	76	16-0
Jan. 11/09	Auburn	Florida	81	65	17-0
Jan. 18/09	Fayetteville, AR	Arkansas	70	61	18-0
Jan. 22/09	Auburn	Alabama	84	66	19-0
Jan. 25/09	Auburn	Tennessee	82	68	20-0
Jan. 29/09	Athens, GA	Georgia	58	67	20-1
Feb. 1/09	Baton Rouge, LA	LSU	66	55	21-1
Feb. 5/09	Auburn	Mississippi	72	65	22-1
Feb. 8/09	Tuscaloosa, AL	Alabama	81	54	23-1
Feb. 12/09	Auburn	Kentucky	81	69	24-1
Feb. 15/09	Starkville, MS	Mississippi	63	58	25-1
Feb. 19/09	Nashville	Vanderbilt	70	73	25-2
Feb. 22/09	Auburn	Georgia	65	59	
Mar. 1/09	Auburn	Arkansas	94	57	27-2

== Player stats ==
Player	Games played	Minutes	Field goals	Three pointers	Free throws	Rebounds	Assists	Blocks	Steals	Points
DeWanna Bonner	34	1123	239	20	218	289	51	55	58	716
Sherell Hobbs	34	1059	145	23	94	164	41	13	61	407
Whitney Boddie	33	1102	154	0	61	153	262	5	63	369
Alli Smalley	34	1047	141	68	28	91	71	7	45	378
Trevesha Jackson	34	781	96	0	41	174	14	20	26	233
KeKe Carrier	34	338	65	0	31	104	12	41	7	161
Chantel Hilliard	30	382	53	0	15	85	7	12	13	121
Reneisha Hobbs	33	348	33	0	23	55	17	4	16	89
Morgan Jennings	30	355	30	0	11	48	34	0	16	71
Jordan Greenleaf	5	125	14	0	7	26	3	4	4	35
Parrisha Simmons	21	165	9	0	4	56	12	4	6	22

== Postseason ==
=== SEC Tournament ===
Date	Location	Opponent	Tigers points	Opp. points	Record
March 6/09	North Little Rock, AR	Ole Miss	71	65	1-0
March 7/09	North Little Rock, AR	Tennessee	78	58	2-0
March 8/09	North Little Rock, AR	Vanderbilt	54	61	2-1

- March 8: Christina Wirth scored 20 points, as Vanderbilt beat Auburn 61-54 to win the Southeastern Conference tournament. The 24-8 Commodores upset the 29-3 Tigers for the second time in three weeks. Vanderbilt also extended its winning streak over Auburn to 15.

=== NCAA basketball tournament ===
- Auburn 85, Lehigh 49
- Rutgers 80, Auburn 52

== Awards and honors ==
- DeWanna Bonner, 2008 Alabama Amateur Athlete of the Year
- DeWanna Bonner, State Farm/WBCA First-Team All-American (she is the fifth Auburn player ever to earn the honor)
- Whitney Boddie, Most Valuable Player, Auburn Women's Basketball Team
- Whitney Boddie, Miami Holiday Tournament Most Valuable Player
- Alli Smalley, FIU Thanksgiving Classic tournament Most Valuable Player

== Team players drafted into the WNBA ==
Round	Pick	Player	WNBA club
DeWanna Bonner	1	5	Phoenix Mercury
