= Bartolotta =

Bartolotta is an Italian surname. Notable people with the surname include:

- Angel Bartolotta (born 1981), American drummer
- Camera Bartolotta (born 1963), American politician
- Daniel Bartolotta (born 1955), Uruguayan footballer and manager
- Jimmy Bartolotta (born 1986), American basketball player
- Paul Bartolotta (born 1961), American chef and restaurateur
