= 2008–09 Oregon State Beavers women's basketball team =

Intercollegiate basketball season

2008–09 Oregon State Beavers women's basketball

WNIT, Third round
- Conference: Pacific-10 Conference
- Record: 20–12 (9–9 PAC-10)
- Head coach: LaVonda Wagner
- Assistant coaches: Kellee Barney; Krista Reinking; Anthony Turner

2008–09 Pacific-10 Conference women's basketball standings
	Conf.				Overall
Team	W		L	PCT	W		L	PCT
No. 2 Stanford †	17	–	1	.944	33	–	5	.868
No. 13 California	15	–	3	.833	27	–	7	.794
No. 19 Arizona State	15	–	3	.833	26	–	9	.743
Oregon State	9	–	9	.500	20	–	12	.625
UCLA	9	–	9	.500	19	–	12	.613
USC	9	–	9	.500	17	–	15	.531
Oregon	5	–	13	.278	9	–	21	.300
Arizona	4	–	14	.222	12	–	19	.387
Washington State	4	–	14	.222	11	–	19	.367
Washington	3	–	15	.167	8	–	22	.267
† 2009 Pac-10 Tournament winner Rankings from AP Poll

The 2008–09 Oregon State Beavers women's basketball team represented Oregon State University in the 2008–09 NCAA Division I basketball season. The Beavers were coached by LaVonda Wagner. The Beavers are a member of the Pacific-10 Conference and competed in the Women's National Invitation Tournament. Oregon State finished the 2008-09 season with a 20-12, the team's most victories since the 1994-95 season.

== Regular season ==
Entering the year, OSU was selected to finish eighth by both the league's coaches and media. The Beavers were 9-9 in Pacific-10 Conference games, finishing in a tie for fourth place. The nine wins were their most wins in league since the 2001-02 season. Oregon State was 13-3 in home games, 6-6 in games played on the road and 1-3 in neutral site contests. Oregon State won 11 non-conference games, which is the most for a Beavers' team since the club joined the Pac-10 more than 20 years ago. Oregon State went 6-0 in the month of December, the first time the team ever accomplished that. It also marked the longest win streak for Oregon State since the 2000-01 season.

=== Roster ===
Number	Name	Height	Position	Class
42	Anita Burdick		Forward	Junior
20	Brttney Davis		Guard	Senior
3	Tiffany Ducker		Center	Senior
52	Brittany Eskridge		Forward	Sophomore
1	Mercedes Fox-Griffin		Guard	Senior
23	Julie Futch		Guard	Junior
24	Brittany Kennedy		Guard	Freshman
5	Kassandra McCallister		Guard	Redshirt Freshman
21	Alex Mitchell		Center	Sophomore
44	Stacey Nichols		Forward	Junior
11	Talisa Rhea		Guard	Sophomore
32	Kirsten Tilleman		Forward	Freshman

=== Schedule ===
Date	Location	Opponent	Beavers points	Opp. points	Record

== Player stats ==
Brittney Davis scored in double figures in the last 17 games straight. Of the Beavers' 32 games in 2008-09, she reached at least 10 points in 24. Talisa Rhea set the Pacific-10 Conference single-game record for three-pointers with 10 in the season opener against Sacramento State. She finished the game with 42 points, which is tied for fifth-most in school history. Rhea also had 64 three-pointers in 2008-09, the third-most in a single season. After just two seasons, she has made 131 three-pointers, which is second-most by an Oregon State player. As a team, the Beavers shot .744 from the free-throw line, a school record. That surpassed the previous best, set in 2004-05, of .734.

Player	Games played	Minutes	Field goals	Three pointers	Free throws	Rebounds	Assists	Blocks	Steals	Points

== Postseason ==
=== Women’s National Invitation Tournament ===
Oregon State made its second trip to the WNIT under head coach LaVonda Wagner and the sixth since the 2001 season. The Beavers opened the WNIT with a 59-47 victory over Portland State at legendary Gill Coliseum. Advancing to the third round, they lost to New Mexico, 61-56, in Rio Rancho. All-time, Oregon State is 12-6 (.667) in the WNIT, winning it in 1980 and 1982. Carol Menken holds the school record for points in a WNIT game with 33 against Drake in 1980.

- March 27:Brittney Davis scored 19 points, but Oregon State suffered a 61-56 loss at New Mexico. The Beavers reached the third round of the WNIT after defeating Portland State last week.

Davis scored her last collegiate three-pointer with 7.2 seconds remaining to pull the Beavers to within three points, making the score 59-56. The shot, a running jumper from way beyond the three-point line, came just seconds after New Mexico nailed two free throws.

== Awards and honors ==
April 25: The Oregon State women's basketball team held its annual banquet at the Club (level) at Reser. The event was sponsored by The Rebounders, the Oregon State women's basketball booster organization. There were more than 200 in attendance at the event, which served as an opportunity to honor the team's seniors: Tiffany Ducker, Brittney Davis and Mercedes Fox-Griffin, and to celebrate the team's accomplishments.

- The 2008-09 award winners included:
  - Birttney Davis (Offensive Player Of The Year)
  - Talisa Rhea (Academic Excellence Award),
  - Mercedes Fox-Griffin (Free-Throw Award and Defensive Player of the Year),
  - Tiffany Ducker (Most Outstanding Rebounder) and
  - Stacey Nichols (Carol Menken-Schaudt Leadership Award). Menken-Schaudt was in attendance to present the award named after herself as well as Aki Hill, Oregon State's former head coach.
- Brittney Davis: All-Pac-10 Third Team
- Mercedes Fox-Griffin: All-Pac-10 Defensive Team
- Mercedes Fox-Griffin:, All-Pac-10 Honorable Mention
- Mercedes Fox-Griffin:, Pac-10 All-Academic Team Honorable Mention
- Talisa Rhea, Pac-10 All-Academic Team
- Talisa Rhea:, All-Pac-10 Honorable Mention

== Team players drafted into the WNBA ==
Round	Pick	Player	WNBA club
