= 2008–09 NCAA Division I women's basketball rankings =

- Season: 2008–09
- NCAA Tournament: 2009
- Preseason No. 1: Connecticut
- NCAA Tournament Champions: Connecticut
NCAA Division I women's basketball rankings


Two human polls comprise the 2008–09 NCAA Division I women's basketball rankings, the AP Poll and the Coaches Poll, in addition to various publications' preseason polls. The AP poll is currently a poll of sportswriters, while the USA Today Coaches' Poll is a poll of college coaches. The AP conducts polls weekly through the end of the regular season and conference play, while the Coaches poll conducts a final, post-NCAA tournament poll as well.

== Legend ==
–	No votes
(#)	Ranking

== AP Poll ==
Team	Pre season	Nov-17	Nov-24	Dec-01	Dec-08	Dec-15	Dec-22	Dec-29	Jan-05	Jan-12	Jan-19	Jan-26	Feb-02	Feb-09	Feb-16	Feb-23	Mar-02	Mar-09
Connecticut	1	1	1	1	1	1	1	1	1	1	1	1	1	1	1	1	1	1
Stanford	2	8	5	4	3	3	11	11	11	9	11	9	7	6	4	3	2	2
Maryland	3	11	10	8	15	15	14	14	14	12	12	8	13	11	9	5	4	3
Oklahoma	4	2	4	6	5	6	5	5	4	3	3	2	2	2	2	2	3	4
Baylor	19	10	6	10	10	7	7	7	6	5	5	4	8	7	5	6	5	5
Duke	8	6	12	12	11	8	6	6	5	4	4	3	4	4	7	10	8	6
Louisville	10	9	7	13	12	9	10	10	10	7	7	6	5	10	8	8	7	7
Auburn	20	20	15	14	13	10	9	9	9	6	6	5	6	5	3	7	6	8
Texas A&M	11	12	8	5	4	4	3	3	3	8	9	11	10	12	14	12	10	9
Ohio State	18	17	20	18	18	18	17	17	16	15	19	15	14	18	20	14	13	10
North Carolina	6	4	2	2	2	2	2	2	2	2	2	10	9	8	10	9	11	11
Florida State	21	22	–	–	–	–	–	–	–	–	22	18	15	14	11	11	12	12
California	9	7	3	3	9	12	13	13	13	11	8	7	3	3	6	4	9	13
Vanderbilt	12	13	17	16	20	19	20	20	24	18	17	20	20	24	18	19	22	14
Pittsburgh	–	–	–	24	16	16	19	19	19	–	25	21	22	19	19	15	14	15
South Dakota St	–	–	–	–	–	–	25	24	23	–	–	24	25	23	22	21	17	16
Iowa State	–	–	25	–	–	–	–	–	–	20	–	22	21	16	21	25	23	17
Tennessee	7	5	9	7	7	11	8	8	7	13	10	13	12	15	13	18	19	18
Arizona State	17	18	21	25	22	21	24	–	–	–	–	–	–	–	25	24	18	19
Xavier	22	23	25	23	–	–	–	–	–	–	–	23	23	21	17	13	16	20
Kansas State	–	–	–	–	25	23	22	22	20	17	18	14	18	20	16	20	–	21
Florida	–	–	–	–	23	20	18	18	18	19	15	12	11	9	15	17	21	22
Notre Dame	16	15	14	11	8	13	12	12	12	10	13	17	19	22	24	23	20	23
Virginia	15	16	16	20	17	17	16	16	15	14	16	19	17	17	23	22	24	24
Texas	13	14	11	9	6	5	4	4	8	16	14	16	16	13	12	16	15	25
Georgia Tech	–	–	–	–	–	25	23	23	22	24	–	–	–	–	–	–	–	–
Boston College	–	–	–	–	–	–	–	–	–	–	–	–	–	–	–	–	25	–
DePaul	–	–	–	–	–	–	–	–	–	–	–	25	24	25	–	–	–	–
Marist	–	–	–	–	–	–	–	–	25	21	20	–	–	–	–	–	–	–
Rutgers	5	3	13	15	14	14	15	15	17	23	21	–	–	–	–	–	–	–
New Mexico	–	–	–	–	–	–	–	25	–	25	23	–	–	–	–	–	–	–
Oklahoma State	14	19	18	19	24	22	21	21	21	22	24	–	–	–	–	–	–	–
TCU	–	24	22	22	19	24	–	–	–	–	–	–	–	–	–	–	–	–
Purdue	23	21	19	17	21	–	–	–	–	–	–	–	–	–	–	–	–	–
Michigan State	–	–	24	21	–	–	–	–	–	–	–	–	–	–	–	–	–	–
Old Dominion	25	25	23	–	–	–	–	–	–	–	–	–	–	–	–	–	–	
LSU	24	–	–	–	–	–	–	–	–	–	–	–	–	–	–	–	–	–

== USA Today Coaches poll ==
Team	Pre season	Nov-17	Nov-24	Dec-01	Dec-08	Dec-15	Dec-22	Dec-29	Jan-05	Jan-12	Jan-19	Jan-26	Feb-02	Feb-09	Feb-16	Feb-23	Mar-02	Mar-09	Apr-07
Connecticut	1	1	1	1	1	1	1	1	1	1	1	1	1	1	1	1	1	1	1
Louisville	11	10	8	15	13	11	13	13	13	11	10	11	10	12	9	8	7	7	2
Stanford	2	8	6	5	4	4	8	8	7	7	11	8	6	5	4	2	2	2	3
Oklahoma	7	4	4	6	6	6	5	5	3	3	2	2	2	2	2	3	3	4	4
Maryland	5	16	14	11	16	16	16	16	15	16	13	9	11	9	7	5	4	3	5
Baylor	17	9	7	10	9	8	7	7	5	5	4	3	7	6	5	7	6	5	6
Texas A&M	10	7	5	4	3	3	3	3	6	6	7	7	4	8	11	9	8	9	7
Vanderbilt	12	12	17	16	19	20	19	19	24	18	18	22	22	24	20	21	23	13	8
Ohio State	19	18	21	18	17	17	17	17	17	13	17	14	12	13	17	14	12	10	9
California	9	6	3	3	7	9	9	9	9	9	6	5	3	3	6	4	9	14	10
Iowa State	–	24	22	22	–	–	–	–	25	20	22	23	23	20	23	24	22	19	11
Arizona State	18	17	19	25	21	21	22	–	–	–	–	–	–	–	–	–	–	–	12
Auburn	21	20	16	13	11	10	10	10	8	8	5	4	5	4	3	6	5	6	13
Duke	8	5	13	14	12	12	11	11	10	10	8	6	8	10	8	11	10	8	14
Pittsburgh	23	–	–	–	20	19	23	22	20	–	–	24	24	23	22	20	19	16	15
Purdue	–	–	23	20	23	–	–	–	–	–	–	–	–	–	–	–	–	–	16
North Carolina	4	3	2	2	2	2	2	2	2	2	3	10	9	7	10	10	11	11	17
Florida State	24	21	–	–	–	–	–	–	–	–	23	20	19	17	12	12	13	12	18
South Dakota St	–	–	–	–	–	22	21	21	23	21	20	19	20	21	18	16	14	15	19
Kansas State	–	–	–	23	18	18	18	18	18	14	15	12	14	16	14	15	21	17	20
Rutgers	3	2	11	12	13	14	14	14	16	23	24	–	–	–	–	–	–	–	21
Michigan State	–	–	–	24	–	–	–	–	–	–	–	–	–	–	–	–	–	–	22
Florida	–	–	–	–	–	24	20	20	19	19	19	16	13	11	15	17	18	21	23
Virginia	15	11	15	19	15	15	15	15	14	12	14	18	15	15	21	19	20	22	24
Xavier	–	22	25	21	–	–	–	–	–	24	21	21	21	19	16	13	15	18	25
Notre Dame	14	15	10	8	8	7	6	6	4	4	9	13	16	22	24	22	17	20	–
Tennessee	6	13	12	9	10	13	12	12	11	15	12	15	17	18	19	23	24	23	–
Texas	13	14	9	6	5	5	4	4	12	17	16	17	18	14	13	18	16	24	–
Middle Tennessee	–	–	–	–	–	–	–	–	–	–	–	–	–	–	–	25	–	–	25
Georgia Tech	–	–	–	–	–	–	25	24	22	25	–	–	–	–	–	–	–	–	–
Wake Forest	–	–	–	–	–	–	–	–	25	–	–	–	–	–	–	–	–	–	–
Bowling Green	–	–	–	–	–	–	–	–	–	–	–	–	–	–	–	–	25	25	–
DePaul	–	–	–	–	–	–	–	–	–	–	–	25	25	25	–	–	–	–	–
Oklahoma State	16	19	18	17	24	23	24	23	21	22	25	–	–	–	–	–	–	–	–
New Mexico	–	–	–	–	–	–	–	25	–	–	–	–	–	–	–	–	–	–	–
TCU	–	–	24	–	22	25	–	–	–	–	–	–	–	–	–	–	–	–	–
Middle Tennessee	–	–	–	–	25	–	–	–	–	–	–	–	–	–	–	–	–	–	–
Old Dominion	20	25	20	–	–	–	–	–	–	–	–	–	–	–	–	–	–	–	–
Georgia	25	23	–	–	–	–	–	–	–	–	–	–	–	–	–	–	–	–	–
LSU	22	–	–	–	–	–	–	–	–	–	–	–	–	–	–	–	–	–	–
