= List of people from Englewood, Colorado =

Coordinates: 39.6478°N 104.9878°W

Location of Englewood in Colorado

This is a list of some notable people who have lived in the City of Englewood, Colorado, United States.

== Academia ==
- Minor J. Coon (1921–2018), biochemist
- David Crockett Graham (1884–1961), missionary, archaeologist

== Arts and entertainment ==
- David Eugene Edwards (1968– ), musician
- Logan Miller (1992– ), actor
- Marshall Reed (1917–1980), actor

== Business ==
- Louis W. Menk (1918–1999), railroad executive

== Politics ==
- Carlotta Walls LaNier (1942– ), civil rights activist
- Ken Summers (1953– ), Colorado state legislator

== Sports ==
=== Ice hockey ===
- Callan Foote (1998– ), defenseman
- Nolan Foote (2000– ), forward

=== Soccer ===
- Jordan Angeli (1986– ), defender, forward
- Mark Lisi (1977– ), midfielder

=== Other ===
- Jimmy Bartolotta (1986– ), basketball guard
- Brad Lidge (1976– ), retired major league pitcher
- Jim Malloy (1932–1972), race car driver
- Chris Narveson (1981– ), baseball pitcher
- Grant Robison (1978– ), U.S. Olympic track and field distance runner
- Jeff Salzenstein (1973– ), tennis player
- Daniel Summerhill (1989– ), cyclist

== See also ==
- List of people from Colorado
- Bibliography of Colorado
- Geography of Colorado
- History of Colorado
- Index of Colorado-related articles
- List of Colorado-related lists
- Outline of Colorado
