= 2005 McDonald's All-American Girls Game =

West	East
80	64
	1st half	2nd half	Total
West	28	52	80
East	28	36	64
- Date: March 30, 2005
- Venue: Joyce Center, South Bend, Indiana
- MVP: Courtney Paris
- Referees: Jeffrey Krantz; Allan Austin; Barbara Eppley
- Attendance: 7,660
- Network: ESPN

McDonald's All-American

The 2005 McDonald's All-American Girls Game was an All-star basketball game played on Wednesday, March 30, 2005, at the Joyce Center in South Bend, Indiana, home of the Fighting Irish of Notre Dame. The game's rosters featured the best and most highly recruited high school girls graduating in 2005. The game was the 4th annual version of the McDonald's All-American Game first played in 2002.

The 48 players were selected from 2,500 nominees by a committee of basketball experts. They were chosen not only for their on-court skills, but for their performances off the court as well. Coach Morgan Wootten, who had more than 1,200 wins as head basketball coach at DeMatha High School, was chairman of the selection committee. Legendary UCLA coach John Wooden, who has been involved in the McDonald's All American Games since its inception, served as chairman of the Games and as an advisor to the selection committee.

Proceeds from the 2005 McDonald's All American High School Basketball Games went to Ronald McDonald House Charities (RMHC) of South Bend and Fort Wayne, Indiana and their Ronald McDonald House programs.

== 2005 Game ==
The fourth annual McDonald's All American Girls game showcased one of the best displays of teamwork over the past four years.

The West was led by stellar play from game MVP Courtney Paris (Chicago Sky) who contributed 16 points, 12 rebounds and four blocks. She helped set the pace when the West went on a 20–5 run to break the game open. The West shot a solid 56% from the floor in the second half and 50% from beyond the arc. Paris' brilliant play was matched by teammate Alexis Gray-Lawson (California) who poured in 12 points and dished out three assists and three steals. The Morgan Wootten National Player of the Year Abby Waner (Duke) added nine points, four rebounds and three assists for the West.

Other key contributors for the West were Lindsay Schrader (Notre Dame) and Ashley Paris (Los Angeles Sparks) who dropped in nine and eight points respectively.

The East received a game-high 19 points from Marissa Coleman (Washington Mystics) and 12 points from Carrem Gay (Connecticut Sun). Kia Vaughn (New York Liberty) ripped down seven boards to go along with her four points.

=== West Roster ===
Number	Name	Height	Weight	Position	Hometown	High school	College of Choice
00	Earnesia Williams	6-0	159	F	Sapulpa, OK, U.S.	Sapulpa	Texas
1	Abigail Waner	5-11	150	G	Highlands Ranch, CO, U.S.	ThunderRidge	Duke
3	Courtney Paris	6-4	245	C	Piedmont, CA, U.S.	Piedmont	Oklahoma
4	Erika Arriaran	5-10	155	G	Norco, CA, U.S.	Norco	Texas
5	Ashley Paris	6-2	190	F	Piedmont, CA, U.S.	Piedmont	Oklahoma
14	Devanei Hampton	6-2	190	F	Oakland, CA, U.S.	Oakland Tech	Cal
15	Juanita Ward	6-0	160	F	Jackson, MS, U.S.	Callaway	Mississippi
21	Alexis Gray-Lawson	5-8	150	G	Oakland, CA, U.S.	Oakland Tech	Cal
24	Lindsay Schrader	6-0	170	F	Bartlett, IL, U.S.	Bartlett	Notre Dame
33	Kirsten Thompson	6-6	200	C	Snohomish, WA, U.S.	Monroe	Arizona State
34	Crystal Boyd	5-11	135	F	North Little Rock, AR, U.S.	Parkview Arts & Science	Texas
35	Christina Wirth	6-1	175	G	Mesa, AZ, U.S.	Seton Catholic	Vanderbilt

=== East Roster ===
Number	Name	Height	Weight	Position	Hometown	High school	College of Choice
4	Kristi Toliver	5-8	125	G	Harrisonburg, VA, U.S.	Harrisonburg	Maryland
15	Kia Vaughn	6-4	205	C	Bronx, NY, U.S.	St. Michael Academy	Rutgers
21	Renee Montgomery	5-7	120	G	Saint Albans, WV, U.S.	South Charleston	Connecticut
22	Erica Brown	5-9	165	G	Lauderdale Lakes, FL, U.S.	Dillard	Georgia
24	DeWanna Bonner	6-4	130	G	Fairfield, AL, U.S.	Fairfield High Preparatory School	Auburn
25	Marissa Coleman	6-1	174	F	Cheltenham, MD, U.S.	St. John's College	Maryland
30	Carrem Gay	6-2	180	F	Valley Stream, NY, U.S.	Christ The King	Duke
31	Crystal Goring	6-3	185	C	Port of Spain, Trinidad	Peddie School	Richmond
32	Rashanda McCants	6-2	165	F	Asheville, NC, U.S.	Asheville	North Carolina
33	Katrina Wheeler	6-4	180	F	Washington, D.C., U.S.	Theodore Roosevelt High School	Undecided
34	Tiffanie Shives	5-10	165	G	Lansing, MI, U.S.	Lansing Christian School	Michigan State
35	Angel Robinson	6-5	183	C	Kennesaw, GA, U.S.	Marietta	Georgia

=== Coaches ===
The West team was coached by:

- Head coach Kelly Flynn of South Sioux City High School (South Sioux City, Nebraska)
- Asst Coach Russ Fuchser of South Sioux City High School (South Sioux City, Nebraska)

The East team was coached by:

- Head coach Anna Jackson of Murrah High School (Jackson, Mississippi)
- Asst Coach Arthur Brown of Murrah High School (Jackson, Mississippi)

=== Boxscore ===
==== Visitors: West ====
##	Player	FGM/A	3PM/A	FTM/A	Points	Off Reb	Def Reb	Tot Reb	PF	Ast	TO	BS	ST	Min
1	*Abigail Waner	4/11	1/ 5	0/ 0	9	3	1	4	3	3	1	0	3	
14	*Devanei Hampton	0/ 4	0/ 0	1/ 4	1	1	2	3	3	2	1	0	0	
21	*Alexis Gray-Lawson	5/ 8	2/ 3	0/ 0	12	0	0	0	3	3	3	0	3	
33	*Kirsten Thompson	2/ 4	0/ 0	1/ 2	5	2	6	8	1	0	0	0	0	
34	*Crystal Boyd	2/ 7	0/ 1	0/ 0	4	2	3	5	1	2	3	3	1	
00	Earnesia Williams	1/ 5	1/ 2	0/ 0	3	1	3	4	1	1	5	1	3	
3	Courtney Paris	7/10	0/ 1	2/ 4	16	4	8	12	2	1	1	4	1	
4	Erika Arriaran	3/ 6	0/ 2	1/ 1	7	1	1	2	0	4	5	0	2	
5	Ashley Paris	4/ 7	0/ 0	0/ 2	8	3	5	8	3	1	1	0	2	
15	Juanita Ward	2/ 9	0/ 0	0/ 0	4	0	1	1	1	2	3	0	0	
24	Lindsay Schrader	4/ 7	1/ 1	0/ 0	9	1	2	3	1	1	0	1	0	
35	Christina Wirth	1/ 3	0/ 0	0/ 0	2	0	2	2	0	0	0	2	0	
	Team					1	2	3						
	TOTALS	35/81	5/15	5/13	80	19	36	55	19	20	23	11	15	0

==== Home: East ====
##	Player	FGM/A	3PM/A	FTM/A	Points	Off Reb	Def Reb	Tot Reb	PF	Ast	TO	BS	ST	Min
21	*Renee Montgomery	0/ 7	0/ 3	0/ 0	0	0	1	1	0	3	2	0	1	
25	*Marissa Coleman	7/15	2/ 5	3/ 4	19	1	1	2	0	3	3	0	0	
30	*Carrem Gay	5/10	0/ 0	2/ 4	12	5	1	6	0	0	4	2	1	
33	*Katrina Wheeler	0/ 6	0/ 2	0/ 0	0	2	3	5	1	1	1	0	2	
35	*Angel Robinson	0/ 1	0/ 0	0/ 0	0	1	0	1	3	0	1	2	0	
4	Kristi Toliver	1/ 7	0/ 5	0/ 0	2	0	3	3	0	4	3	1	0	
15	Kia Vaughn	2/ 5	0/ 0	0/ 0	4	4	3	7	1	0	1	0	0	
22	Erica Brown	2/ 7	0/ 1	2/ 2	6	2	4	6	2	1	3	0	1	
24	DeWanna Bonner	1/ 6	0/ 1	4/ 4	6	3	3	6	1	2	1	0	4	
31	Crystal Goring	1/ 4	0/ 0	3/ 4	5	1	4	5	1	0	1	0	1	
32	Rashanda McCants	2/10	0/ 1	3/ 4	7	1	2	3	1	1	1	2	4	
34	Tiffanie Shives	1/ 4	1/ 3	0/ 0	3	1	3	4	1	0	3	0	0	
	Team					5	4	9						
	TOTALS	22/82	3/21	17/22	64	26	32	58	11	15	24	7	14	0

(* = Starting Line-up)

== All-American Week ==
=== Schedule ===
- Tuesday, March 29: Powerade Jamfest
  - Three-Point Shoot-out
  - Timed Basketball Skills Competition
- Wednesday, March 30: 4th Annual Girls All-American Game

The Powerade JamFest is a skills-competition evening featuring basketball players who demonstrate their skills in two crowd-entertaining ways. Since the first All-American game in 2002, players have competed in a 3-point shooting challenge and a timed basketball skills competition.

=== Contest Winners ===
- Erika Arriaran was winner of the 2005 3-point shoot-out.
- The skills competition was won by Christina Wirth

== See also ==
2005 McDonald's All-American Boys Game
