= 2008–09 Arizona State Sun Devils women's basketball team =

Intercollegiate basketball season

2008–09 Arizona State Sun Devils women's basketball

NCAA women's Division I tournament, second round
- Conference: Pacific-10 Conference

Ranking
- Coaches: No. 12
- Record: 26-9 ( Pac-10)
- Head coach: Charli Turner Thorne
- Assistant coaches: Joseph Anders; Meg Sanders; Laura Hughes
- Home arena: Wells Fargo Arena

2008–09 Pacific-10 Conference women's basketball standings
	Conf.				Overall
Team	W		L	PCT	W		L	PCT
No. 2 Stanford †	17	–	1	.944	33	–	5	.868
No. 13 California	15	–	3	.833	27	–	7	.794
No. 19 Arizona State	15	–	3	.833	26	–	9	.743
Oregon State	9	–	9	.500	20	–	12	.625
UCLA	9	–	9	.500	19	–	12	.613
USC	9	–	9	.500	17	–	15	.531
Oregon	5	–	13	.278	9	–	21	.300
Arizona	4	–	14	.222	12	–	19	.387
Washington State	4	–	14	.222	11	–	19	.367
Washington	3	–	15	.167	8	–	22	.267
† 2009 Pac-10 Tournament winner Rankings from AP Poll

The 2008–09 Arizona State Sun Devils women's basketball team represented Arizona State University in the 2008–09 NCAA Division I women's basketball season. The Sun Devils were coached by Charli Turner Thorne. The Sun Devils were a member of the Pacific-10 Conference.

== Exhibition ==
Date	Location	Opponent	Sun Devils points	Opp. points	Record
Nov. 5/08	Tempe, AZ	Houston Jaguars	83	61	1-0

== Preseason WNIT ==
Date	Location	Opponent	Sun Devils points	Opp. points	Record
Nov. 14/08	Tempe, Arizona	Cleveland State	76	59	1-0
Nov. 16/08	Tempe	Tulane	86	53	2-0
Nov. 21/08	Norman, OK	Oklahoma	57	70	2-1

== Regular season ==
=== Roster ===
Number	Name	Height	Position	Class
42	Kali Bennett	6-5	Center	Sophomore
25	Kimberly Brandon	6-2	Guard/Forward	Freshman
24	Jazlyn Davis	5-9	Guard	Junior
33	Sybil Dosty	6-3	Center	Senior
12	Alex Earl	5-10	Guard	Freshman
11	Kate Engelbrecht	5-10	Guard	Senior
30	Gabby Fage	5-11	Guard	Junior
10	Nia Fanaika	5-8	Guard	Senior
22	Janae Fulcher	6-3	Forward	Freshman
20	Briann January	5-8	Guard	Senior
34	Lauren Lacey	6-3	Forward/Center	Senior
21	Kayli Murphy	6-2	Forward/Center	Junior
13	Danielle Orsillo	5-9	Guard	Redshirt Junior
4	Haley Parsons	5-5	Guard	Freshman
1	Dymond Simon	5-5	Guard	Junior
23	Kirsten Thompson	6-6	Center	Senior
32	Becca Tobin	6-4	Forward	Sophomore

=== Schedule ===
Date	Location	Opponent	Sun Devils points	Opp. points	Record
Nov. 28/08	Freeport, Bahamas	Hofstra	80	54	1-0
Nov. 29/08	Freeport, Bahamas	Florida	60	65	1-1
Dec. 3/08	Davis, CA	UC Davis	73	59	2-1
Dec. 6/08	Tempe	UC Irvine	75	23	3-1
Dec. 7/08	Tempe	Northern Arizona	91	65	4-1
Dec. 14/08	Tempe	UC Riverside	68	45	5-1
Dec.18/08	Austin, TX	Texas	71	81	5-2
Dec. 21/08	Tempe	Xavier	75	57	6-2
Dec. 28/08	Lincoln, NE	Nebraska	58	62	6-3
Jan. 2/09	Tempe	Stanford	61	64	6-4
Jan. 4/09	Tempe	California	53	54	6-5
Jan. 8/09	Corvalis, OR	Oregon State	61	36	7-5
Jan. 10/09	Eugene, OR	Oregon	81	53	8-5
Jan. 15/09	Tempe	UCLA	68	44	9-5
Jan. 17/09	Tempe	USC	83	71	10-5
Jan. 24/09	Tempe	Arizona	75	38	11-5
Jan.29 /09	Pullman, WA	Washington State	66	47	12-5
Jan.29 /09	Seattle, WA	Washington	80	64	13-5
Feb. 5/09	Tempe	Oregon	68	56	14-5
Feb. 7/09	Tempe	Oregon State	65	54	15-5
Feb. 12/09	Los Angeles, CA	USC	72	69	16-5
Feb. 14/09	Los Angeles, CA	UCLA	69	66	17-5
Feb. 21/09	Tucson, AZ	Arizona	60	53	18-5
Feb. 26/09	Tempe	Washington	55	32	19-5
Feb. 28/09	Tempe	Washington State	76	35	20-5
Mar. 5/09	Berkeley, CA	California	63	41	21-5
Mar. 7/09	Palo Alto, CA	Stanford	68	77	21-6

=== Pacific-10 Tournament ===
- Quarterfinals
  - USC 70, Arizona State 65
- March 13: Heather Oliver scored 17 points, and Camille LeNoir had 18 as Southern California beat Arizona State 70-65 in the quarterfinals of the Pac-10 tournament. The Trojans shot 52.9 percent and made 10 3-pointers. It was only the second time a six seed had beaten a third seed in the tournament.

Lauren Lacey had 14 points and Danielle Orsillo 17 points and seven rebounds for the Sun Devils. With less than 4 minutes remaining, Arizona State was behind by three points but was unable to win the game.

== Player stats ==
Player	Games Played	Minutes	Field goals	Three Pointers	Free Throws	Rebounds	Assists	Blocks	Steals	Points

== Postseason ==
=== NCAA basketball tournament ===
- Arizona State 58, Georgia 47
- Arizona State 63, Florida State 58
- Arizona State 84, Texas A&M 69
- Connecticut 83, Arizona State 64

== Team players drafted into the WNBA ==
Round	Pick	Player	WNBA club
1	6	Briann January	Indiana Fever

== See also ==
- 2008-09 Arizona State Sun Devils men's basketball team
