= 2008–09 Tennessee Lady Volunteers basketball team =

Intercollegiate basketball season

2008–09 Tennessee Lady Volunteers basketball

NCAA tournament, first round
- Conference: Southeast Conference
- Record: 22–11 (9–5 SEC)
- Head coach: Pat Summitt
- Assistant coaches: Holly Warlick; Dean Lockwood; Daedra Charles-Furlow
- Home arena: Thompson-Boling Arena

2008–09 SEC women's basketball standings
| | Conf. | | | | Overall |
| Team | W | | L | PCT | W | | L | PCT |
|---|---|---|---|---|---|---|---|---|
| No. 8 Auburn | 12 | – | 2 | .857 | 30 | – | 4 | .882 |
| No. 14 Vanderbilt^{†} | 10 | – | 4 | .714 | 26 | – | 9 | .743 |
| LSU | 10 | – | 4 | .714 | 19 | – | 11 | .633 |
| No. 22 Florida | 9 | – | 5 | .643 | 24 | – | 8 | .750 |
| No. 18 Tennessee | 9 | – | 5 | .643 | 22 | – | 11 | .667 |
| Mississippi State | 8 | – | 6 | .571 | 23 | – | 10 | .697 |
| Georgia | 7 | – | 7 | .500 | 18 | – | 14 | .563 |
| Arkansas | 6 | – | 8 | .429 | 18 | – | 14 | .563 |
| Ole Miss | 5 | – | 9 | .357 | 18 | – | 15 | .545 |
| Kentucky | 5 | – | 9 | .357 | 16 | – | 16 | .500 |
| South Carolina | 2 | – | 12 | .143 | 10 | – | 18 | .357 |
| Alabama | 1 | – | 13 | .071 | 13 | – | 17 | .433 |
† 2009 SEC tournament winner Rankings from AP poll

The 2008–09 Tennessee Lady Volunteers basketball team represented the University of Tennessee. The team was coached by Pat Summitt and the team played their home games at Thompson-Boling Arena. The Lady Vols were a member of the Southeastern Conference.

== Offseason ==
=== Signees ===
- Six signees committed to the Lady Vols and will comprise the Lady Vol basketball class of 2012. Joining the back-to-back NCAA Champion Lady Vols will be Briana Bass (5–2, PG, North Central H.S., Indianapolis, Ind.), Alyssia Brewer (6–3, F, Sapulpa H.S., Sapulpa, Okla.), Amber Gray (6–1, F, Lakota West H.S., West Chester, Ohio), Glory Johnson (6–3, F/C, The Webb School, Knoxville, Tenn.), Alicia Manning (6–1, G/F, Etowah H.S., Woodstock, Ga.) and Shekinna Stricklen (6–2, G/F, Morrilton H.S., Morrilton, Ark.).

== Regular season ==
- On February 5, 2009, Pat Summitt won her 1,000 basketball game.
- The team had a rebuilding season, due to the departure of the first pick in the 2008 WNBA draft, Candace Parker. They finished the season at 22–11 and entered the NCAA tournament with the lowest seeding in the program's history at #5.

== NCAA basketball tournament ==
- Berkeley Regional
  - Ball State 71, Tennessee 55

In the opening round of the tournament they played a 26–8 Ball State Cardinals team that was making their NCAA tourney debut. Ball State would go on to win the game 71–55 making history. The Lady Volunteers had never lost in the first two rounds of the tournament, going 42–0 through the years. Tennessee also became the first defending champ to lose its opening game in the women's tourney.

== Awards and honors ==
- The U.S. Basketball Writers Association (USBWA) named Tennessee freshman cager Shekinna Stricklen its national Freshman of the Year on Wednesday. Stricklen becomes the first Lady Vol to earn the prestigious honor from the USBWA.

== Team players drafted into the WNBA ==
- No one from the Lady Volunteers was selected in the 2009 WNBA draft.

== See also ==
- UConn–Tennessee rivalry
- 2008–09 Tennessee Volunteers men's basketball team
