= 2008–09 Stanford Cardinal women's basketball team =

Intercollegiate basketball season

2008–09 Stanford Cardinal women's basketball

Waikiki Beach Marriott Classic Champions Pacific-10 Tournament Champions

NCAA women's Division I tournament, Final Four
- Conference: Pacific-10 Conference

Ranking
- Coaches: No. 3
- AP: No. 2
- Record: 33–5 (17–1 Pac-10)
- Head coach: Tara VanDerveer
- Assistant coaches: Amy Tucker; Bobbie Kelsey; Kate Paye
- Home arena: Maples Pavilion

2008–09 Pacific-10 Conference women's basketball standings
	Conf.				Overall
Team	W		L	PCT	W		L	PCT
No. 2 Stanford †	17	–	1	.944	33	–	5	.868
No. 13 California	15	–	3	.833	27	–	7	.794
No. 19 Arizona State	15	–	3	.833	26	–	9	.743
Oregon State	9	–	9	.500	20	–	12	.625
UCLA	9	–	9	.500	19	–	12	.613
USC	9	–	9	.500	17	–	15	.531
Oregon	5	–	13	.278	9	–	21	.300
Arizona	4	–	14	.222	12	–	19	.387
Washington State	4	–	14	.222	11	–	19	.367
Washington	3	–	15	.167	8	–	22	.267
† 2009 Pac-10 Tournament winner Rankings from AP Poll

The 2008–09 Stanford Cardinal women's basketball team represented Stanford University in the 2008–09 NCAA Division I women's basketball season. The Cardinal were coached by Tara VanDerveer. The Cardinal are a member of the Pacific-10 Conference, and attempted to win their third NCAA championship.

== Exhibition ==
Date	Location	Opponent	Cardinal points	Opp. points	Record
Nov. 1/08	Stanford	Chico State	123	39	1-0
Nov. 7/08	Stanford	Vanguard	87	41	2-0

== Regular season ==
- Nov. 30: Jillian Harmon scored 18 points in the first half as Stanford rolled to an 83-54 victory over Hawaii to finish 3-0 at the Waikiki Beach Marriott Classic. Jayne Appel added 16 points on 8-of-8 shooting and grabbed five rebounds. Sarah Boothe, a reserve, scored 14 points in the second half. With mostly backups in, Stanford went on a 28-9 run to start the second half with a 69-33 lead.
- Jan. 8: The Cardinal's 112-35 win over the Washington Huskies was the largest in school and conference history. Jayne Appel had 21 points, nine rebounds and two blocked shots in only 19 minutes, Jeanette Pohlen added 16 points and eight assists. The Cardinal made 14 3-pointers on the way to the largest margin of victory in Pac-10 and program history.

Jillian Harmon added 14 points in 16 minutes of action as the Cardinal bested a 73-point win over Long Beach State from December 8, 1993 (122-49) with their fourth straight victory. Sarah Morton scored seven points to lead Washington with its worst loss in school history. The points allowed were the most ever by the Huskies, who scored their fewest points since getting 30 against Portland State on February 13, 1976. It was Stanford's sixth consecutive win in the series, 10th in a row at home against the Huskies in Maples Pavilion and 10th in 11 overall dating to January 4, 2004.

=== Roster ===
Number	Name	Height	Position	Class
2	Jayne Appel	6-4	Forward/center	Junior
42	Sarah Boothe	6-5	Forward/center	Freshman
24	Ashley Cimino	6-3	Forward	Sophomore
31	Morgan Clyburn		Forward/center	Senior
20	Hannah Donaghe	5-11	Guard	Sophomore
21	Rosalyn Gold-Onwude	5-10	Guard	Redshirt junior
33	Jillian Harmon	6-1	Forward	Senior
5	Michelle Harrison	6-3	Forward	Redshirt sophomore
10	J.J. Hones	5-10	Guard	Junior
15	Lindy La Rocque	5-8	Guard	Freshman
1	Grace Mashore	5-10	Guard	Freshman
0	Melanie Murphy	5-9	Guard	Redshirt sophomore
30	Nneka Ogwumike	6-2	Forward	Freshman
14	Kayla Pedersen	6-4	Forward	Sophomore
23	Jeanette Pohlen	6-0	Guard	Sophomore

=== Schedule ===
Date	Location	Opponent	Cardinal points	Opp. points	Record
Nov. 14/08	Stanford	Minnesota	68	55	1-0
Nov. 16/08	Waco, TX	Baylor	65	81	1-1
Nov. 20/08	Stanford	New Mexico	84	46	2-1
Nov. 23/08	Stanford	Rutgers	81	47	3-1
Nov. 28/08	Honolulu	Purdue	78	70	4-1
Nov. 29/08	Honolulu	Iowa State	83	45	5-1
Nov. 30/08	Honolulu	Hawaii	83	54	6-1
Dec. 13/08	Stanford	Fresno State	100	62	7-1
Dec. 16/08	Durham, NC	Duke	52	56	7-2
Dec. 19/08	Columbia, SC	South Carolina	78	47	8-2
Dec. 21/08	Knoxville, TN	Tennessee	69	79	8-3
Dec. 28/08	Stanford	UC Davis	84	49	9-3
Jan. 2/09	Tempe, AZ	Arizona State	64	61	9-3
Jan. 4/09	Tucson, AZ	Arizona	70	61	10-3
Jan. 8/09	Stanford	Washington	112	35	11-3
Jan. 10/09	Stanford	Washington State	102	53	12-3
Jan. 18/09	Berkeley, CA	California	54	57	12-4
Jan. 22/09	Eugene, OR	Oregon	85	57	13-4
Jan. 24/09	Corvallis, OR	Oregon State	69	54	14-4
Jan. 29/09	Stanford	USC	81	53	15-4
Feb. 1/09	Stanford	UCLA	68	51	16-4
Feb. 6/09	Pullman, WA	Washington State	76	46	17-4
Feb. 8/09	Seattle, WA	Washington	76	54	18-4
Feb. 14/09	Stanford	California	58	41	19-4
Feb. 19/09	Stanford	Oregon State	72	43	20-4
Feb. 21/09	Stanford	Oregon	68	49	21-4
Feb. 27/09	Los Angeles	UCLA	69	58	22-4
Mar. 1/09	Los Angeles	USC	85	74	23-4
Mar. 5/09	Stanford	Arizona	70	67	24-4
Mar. 7/09	Stanford	Arizona State	77	68	25-4

== Player stats ==
Player	Games played	Minutes	Field goals	Three pointers	Free throws	Rebounds	Assists	Blocks	Steals	Points

== Postseason ==
=== Pacific-10 Tournament ===
- March 13: Stanford guards hit 10 three-point shots, including four each by sophomore starter Jeanette Pohlen and freshman reserve Lindy La Rocque, as the Cardinal defeated Arizona 77-46 in the first round. Nnemkadi Ogwumike added 15 points and Jillian Harmon 11.
- March 14: Stanford defeated UCLA 73-47 in the semifinals behind Nnemkadi Ogwumike's 15 points and 10 rebounds. Rosalyn Gold-Onwude and Sarah Boothe each scored 12 points off the bench, and Stanford opened the second half with a 20-3 run to put the game out of reach.
- March 15: Kayla Pedersen had a season-high 25 points and nine rebounds as Stanford defeated Southern California 89-64 to win its sixth overall and second consecutive Pac-10 title. Pedersen, a sophomore, finished 10-for-18 from the field and was chosen as the Outstanding Player of the Tournament. Nnemkadi Ogwumike, who along with senior Jillian Harmon was named to the All-Tournament team, had 14 points and Jeanette Pohlen added 10 points.

=== NCAA basketball tournament ===
Stanford reached the 2009 NCAA National semi-finals, losing to the eventual champion University of Connecticut (83-64). In the first two rounds in San Diego, they beat UC Santa Barbara 74-39 and San Diego State 77-49. In the Berkeley regionals, they defeated Ohio State 84-66 and Iowa State 74-53.

== Team players drafted into the WNBA ==
- No one from the Cardinal was selected in the 2009 WNBA draft.

== See also ==
- Stanford Cardinal
