= 2008–09 Duke Blue Devils women's basketball team =

Intercollegiate basketball season

2008–09 Duke Blue Devils women's basketball

2009 NCAA Division I women's basketball tournament, Lost Second Round
- Conference: Atlantic Coast Conference

Ranking
- Coaches: No. 14
- AP: No. 6
- Record: 27-6 ( ACC)
- Head coach: Joanne P. McCallie
- Assistant coaches: Al Brown; Samantha Williams; Shannon Perry
- Home arena: Cameron Indoor Stadium

The 2008–09 Duke Blue Devils women's basketball team represented Duke University in the 2008–09 NCAA Division I basketball season. The Blue Devils were coached by Joanne P. McCallie, (also known as Coach P) and the Blue Devils played their home games at Cameron Indoor Stadium in Durham, North Carolina. The Blue Devils are a member of the Atlantic Coast Conference. The Blue Devils reached the 25-win mark for the 11th straight season, collected their 12th straight 10-win ACC season. McCallie guided Duke to a 14-0 record at home in Cameron Indoor Stadium marking only the second time in school history the Blue Devils have gone undefeated at home. Duke was also a No. 1 seed in the NCAA Tournament for the seventh time in school history and the third time out of the last four years.

== Regular season ==
=== Roster ===
Number	Name	Height	Position	Class
11	Chante Black	6-5	Center	Senior
21	Joy Cheek	6-1	Forward	Junior
13	Karima Christmas	5-11	Forward/Guard	Sophomore
30	Carmen Gay	6-2	Forward	Senior
1	Chelsea Hopkins	5-8	Guard	Freshman
31	Keturah Jackson	6-0	Forward/Guard	Junior
15	Bridgette Mitchell	6-0	Forward/Guard	Junior
24	Kathleen Scheer	6-2	Forward/Guard	Freshman
3	Shay Selby	5-9	Guard	Freshman
5	Jasmine Thomas	5-9	Guard	Sophomore
34	Krystal Thomas	6-4	Center	Sophomore
4	Abby Waner	5-10	Guard	Senior

=== Schedule ===
Date	Location	Opponent	Blue Devils points	Opp. points	Record

== Player stats ==
Player	Games played	Minutes	Field goals	Three pointers	Free throws	Rebounds	Assists	Blocks	Steals	Points

== Postseason ==
=== NCAA basketball tournament ===
- Berkeley Regional
  - Duke 83, Austin Peay 42
  - 2008–09 Michigan State Spartans women's basketball team 63, Duke 49

== Awards and honors ==
- Chante Black, ACC Defensive Player of the Year
- Chante Black, John R. Wooden Award finalist
- Chante Black, State Farm All-America team
- Chante Black, USBWA All-America first team
- Chante Black, third team Associated Press All-America,
- Chante Black, All-ACC
- Chante Black, All-ACC Defensive team
- Chante Black, midseason candidate for the Naismith Award.
- Carrem Gay, All-ACC Tournament first team
- Abby Waner, 2009 Robin Roberts/WBCA Broadcasting Scholarship and was a finalist for the Lowe’s Senior Class Award in 2009.
- Jasmine Thomas, ESPN The Magazine Academic All-District III
- Jasmine Thomas, All-ACC Academic Team honors
- Abby Waner, All-ACC Tournament first team selection

=== Team awards ===
Team awards were voted on by team members and staff

- Chante Black, Best Rebounder
- Chante Black, Player of the Year awards
- Abby Waner, Assist Maker award
- Abby Waner, Best Free Throw Shooter award
- Carrem Gay, Meanest Mother on the Court Award (represents the Blue Devil that does the dirty work, including assists, steals and leads the team in floor burns).
- Keturah Jackson, Best Defender award
- Karima Christmas, Sixth Player of the Year
- Karima Christmas, Most Improved

== Team players drafted into the WNBA ==
Round	Pick	Player	WNBA club
1	10	Chante Black	Connecticut Sun
2	21	Abby Waner	New York Liberty

April 23: Carrem Gay has signed a training camp contract with the Connecticut Sun of the WNBA. Gay, who is from New York, N.Y., averaged 6.6 points, 5.1 rebounds and 1.7 steals for the Blue Devils in 2008-09.

== See also ==
- 2008–09 Duke Blue Devils men's basketball team
