= Abby Waner =

American basketball player (born 1986)

Personal information
- Born: October 31, 1986 (age 40) Englewood, Colorado, U.S.
- Listed height: 5 ft 11 in (1.80 m)
- Listed weight: 155 lb (70 kg)

Career information
- High school: ThunderRidge (Highlands Ranch, Colorado)
- College: Duke (2005–2009)
- WNBA draft: 2009: 2nd round, 21st overall pick
- Drafted by: New York Liberty
- Position: Shooting guard

Career highlights
- ACC All-Freshman Team (2006); Gatorade National Player of the Year (2005); Morgan Wootten Player of the Year (2005); McDonald's All-American (2005)
- Stats at Basketball Reference
Medals
Women's basketball
Representing the United States
FIBA Under-19 World Cup
Gold medal – first place	2005 Tunisia	Team
FIBA Under-18 Americas Championship
Gold medal – first place	2004 Puerto Rico	Team

Abigail Nellie Waner (born October 31, 1986) is an American basketball player who, after a collegiate career at Duke, was drafted by the New York Liberty in the 2009 WNBA draft, and was waived on May 29, 2009. In 2008, she became a college basketball analyst for ESPN and was named assistant coach of the University of Denver's women's basketball team in 2012. Born in Englewood, Colorado, Waner is married to fellow Colorado-born basketball player Jimmy Bartolotta.

== Playing career ==
=== High school ===
As a senior Waner won the Morgan Wootten award, given to the McDonald's All American player who exemplifies outstanding character, exhibits leadership and embodies the values of being a student-athlete in both schoolwork and community service activities. She led ThunderRidge high school to three Class 5A State Basketball Championships during her high school career. In 2004, Waner was named Colorado Miss Basketball and Colorado Player of the Year while leading the state in scoring. She also broke the Colorado girl's single game scoring record when she tossed in 61 points in her final regular season game. Waner finished her high school career with an impressive 92-8 record. Also, Waner played her high school ball and graduated alongside WNBA draftee and former sport stacking world record holder Emily Fox. Waner was named a WBCA All-American. She participated in the 2005 WBCA High School All-America Game, where she scored sixteen points.

=== USA Basketball ===
Waner suited up for USA Basketball on several occasions. In the summer of 2004, Waner competed at the Junior World Championship. She led the Junior World Championship Qualifying Team to a 5-0 record in Tunisia and started all five contests while averaging 12.0 points, 2.0 rebounds, 3.8 assists and 2.2 steals. Her next appearance for Team USA was in the summer of 2005 at the Under 19 World Championship. She started all eight games as the US went 8-0 record and won the second gold medal in six attempts for the U19 team. Statistically, she averaged 8.9 points, 3.0 assists, 2.0 rebounds and hit 40.6 percent of her three-pointers. At the Under 21 World Championship in the Summer of 2007, she led the team to an 8-0 record and the gold medal in Moscow, Russia. This time, she started two of eight contests, while averaging 5.9 points, 2.4 rebounds, 1.4 assists and 1.1 steals in 18.5 minutes a contest.

=== Duke University ===
Waner registered 222 career three-pointers over four years to rank 12th on the ACC all-time list and first all-time at Duke. She became the first Duke player and eighth ACC player to register 45 or more three-pointers in four consecutive years.

Her 691 career three-pointers attempted ranks seventh in ACC history and first at Duke. Not only did Waner hit three-pointers, but she was a great all-around student-athlete as she became the fifth player in ACC history to notch over 1,400 points, 400 rebounds, 400 assists and 300 steals. Waner owns the single-game Duke record for steals with 10 against Utah Valley on Dec. 18, 2007.

=== New York Liberty ===
Waner got her first taste of the WNBA preseason in a 77-71 victory over the Washington Mystics. Waner played for 15 minutes, scored 3 field goals, 1 three-pointer, 1 rebound and 1 steal. She was released prior to the start of the 2009 WNBA season.

== Duke statistics ==
Legend
GP	Games played	GS	Games started	MPG	Minutes per game
FG%	Field goal percentage	3P%	3-point field goal percentage	FT%	Free throw percentage
RPG	Rebounds per game	APG	Assists per game	SPG	Steals per game
BPG	Blocks per game	PPG	Points per game	**Bold**	Career high

Year	Team	GP	Points	FG%	3P%	FT%	RPG	APG	SPG	BPG	PPG
2005-06	Duke	**35**	310	45.1	**38.2**	69.1	2.5	3.2	1.9	0.2	8.9
2006-07	Duke	34	**478**	**46.1**	36.2	76.9	**4.4**	2.7	2.5	0.4	**14.1**
2007-08	Duke	31	319	32.7	26.1	73.5	3.6	**3.8**	2.6	0.2	10.3
2008-09	Duke	31	301	33.3	29.9	**78.0**	3.1	3.5	**2.7**	**0.5**	9.7
Career		131	1408	39.2	32.1	74.4	3.4	3.3	2.4	0.3	10.7

== Awards and honors ==
- 2009 Robin Roberts/WBCA Broadcasting Scholarship and was a finalist for the Lowe's Senior Class Award in 2009.
- Three-time All-ACC Tournament first team selection
- Gatorade National Player of the Year
- McDonald's National Player of the Year (Morgan Wootten award)

== Present-day ==
- Director of Marketing & Leasing at Health Connect Properties, Inc. (HCP) in Denver, CO.
