= Christina Wirth =

American basketball player (born 1987)

Personal information
- Born: April 18, 1987 (age 39) Mesa, Arizona, U.S.
- Listed height: 6 ft 1 in (1.85 m)
- Listed weight: 185 lb (84 kg)

Career information
- High school: Seton Catholic (Chandler, Arizona)
- College: Vanderbilt (2005–2009)
- WNBA draft: 2009: 2nd round, 19th overall pick
- Drafted by: Indiana Fever
- Position: Forward

Career history
- 2009: Indiana Fever

Career highlights
- SEC Tournament MVP (2009); 2× First-team All-SEC (2008, 2009); McDonald's All-American (2005); Gatorade Arizona Player of the Year (2005)
- Stats at WNBA.com
- Stats at Basketball Reference
Medals
Women's basketball
Representing the United States
FIBA Under-19 World Cup
Gold medal – first place	2005 Tunisia	Team
FIBA Under-18 Americas Championship
Gold medal – first place	2004 Puerto Rico	Team

Christina Wirth (born April 18, 1987) is an American basketball player who most recently played for the Indiana Fever of the WNBA. She is the daughter of Alan Wirth, a former major league baseball player with the San Francisco Giants and the Oakland Athletics.

== Playing career ==
=== High school ===
Wirth played her high school basketball at Seton Catholic in Arizona. While at Seton Catholic she compiled 2,550 points, 1,173 rebounds, 312 steals, 266 assists and 120 blocks. In competitive play, she led Seton Catholic to a state runner-up finish and a 28–7 record as a senior in 2004–05. Her statistics as a senior included an average 25.3 points per game, 11.2 rebounds per game, 2.2 steals per game, and 2.2 assists per game. She participated in the 2005 McDonald's All-American game and won the team ball competition.

=== USA Basketball ===
Wirth was a member of the USA Women's U18 team which won the gold medal at the FIBA Americas Championship in Mayaguez, Puerto Rico. The event was held in August 2004, when the USA team defeated Puerto Rico to win the championship. Wirth averaged 1.8 points per game.

Wirth continued with the team as it became the U19 team, and competed in the 2005 U19 World Championships in Tunis, Tunisia. The USA team won all eight games, winning the gold medal. Wirth averaged 3.6 points per game.

=== Vanderbilt ===
Wirth's rookie season with Vanderbilt was in 2005–06. She managed to be one of only four Commodores to appear in all 32 games. She played four positions on the floor as freshman. For the first 15 games of her collegiate career, she was in the starting lineup.

Her first two collegiate games were played just miles from her home, as Vanderbilt traveled to Tempe, Arizona for the WBCA/BTI Classic hosted by Arizona State. Statistically, she scored two points in her initial game, and had nine rebounds. In her second contest, she reached double figures in scoring by posting 13 points against Clemson. On two occasions, she would lead the Commodores in scoring (vs. North Carolina in Dec., and vs. Alabama in the SEC Tournament).

In her senior year, Wirth led the Commodores to their 14th appearance in the NCAA Sweet 16 after earning Most Valuable Player honors en route to Vanderbilt's sixth Southeastern Conference Tournament championship. Her last game for the Commodores was played on March 28, 2009, when Vanderbilt fell to Maryland by a score of 78–74 in the Sweet Sixteen of the 2009 NCAA Women's Division I Basketball Tournament. Wirth played 37 minutes and scored 28 points.

Academically, Wirth was a four-time honoree on Vanderbilt's Dean's List. She was named a Region IV Academic All-American by CoSIDA in 2007–08 and has earned Southeastern Conference Honor Roll status three times. At Vanderbilt's Peabody College of Education and Human Development, Wirth has carried a 3.55 GPA while majoring in human and organizational development and minoring in child development. She was also named the 2009 SEC Scholar-Athlete of the Year by league coaches, and was chosen to the ESPN The Magazine Academic All-America third team. Wirth has carried a 3.6 GPA and has begun pursuing a master's degree in nursing.

=== Indiana Fever ===
She was selected in the 2nd round, 19th overall in the 2009 WNBA draft. Wirth got her first taste of WNBA action in a 68–51 victory against the Minnesota Lynx on May 23. Wirth played for 18 minutes, scored 3 field goals, 1 three pointer, 2 free throws made, 3 rebounds and 1 assist. In her first season with the Fever, Wirth played in the 2009 WNBA Finals.

== Europe ==
In the fall of 2009, Wirth reunited with Vanderbilt teammate Jennifer Risper. Both signed for a Slovak team officially known as BK PU Bemaco Prešov. The season is scheduled to end in April 2010.

== Personal ==
Along with former Vanderbilt teammate Jen Risper, the two are adjusting to professional basketball. Wirth and Risper, now with the Indiana Fever and the Chicago Sky, helped one another move into their new respective homes. After four years together with the Commodores, separating from each other and the rest of their teammates has been an adjustment. Wirth and Risper will meet May 28 in Indianapolis for a preseason game. Wirth is currently married.

Four of her sisters have played college basketball, three in NCAA Division I—older sister Alana at Division II Barry, younger sister Theresa at Denver, and her youngest sisters, identical twins Jenn and LeeAnne, at Gonzaga.

== Career stats ==
Legend
GP	Games played	GS	Games started	MPG	Minutes per game	RPG	Rebounds per game
APG	Assists per game	SPG	Steals per game	BPG	Blocks per game	PPG	Points per game
TO	Turnovers per game	FG%	Field-goal percentage	3P%	3-point field-goal percentage	FT%	Free-throw percentage
**Bold**	Career best	°	League leader

=== College ===
Year	Games	Minutes	Field goals	Three pointers	Rebounds	Assists	Blocks	Steals	Points
2005-06	32	560	66	31	79	34	3	26	181
2006-07	34	989	140	53	148	80	3	27	387
2007-08	34	1097	165	71	170	89	9	48	446
2008-09	35	1176	212	80	198	74	8	52	582

=== WNBA ===
==== Regular season ====
Year	Team	GP	GS	MPG	FG%	3P%	FT%	RPG	APG	SPG	BPG	TO	PPG
2009	Indiana	21	0	5.8	.276	.357	1.000	.7	.6	.1	.0	.1	1.0

==== Playoffs ====
Year	Team	GP	GS	MPG	FG%	3P%	FT%	RPG	APG	SPG	BPG	TO	PPG
2009	Indiana	5	0	5.4	.429	.000	–	.6	.4	.0	.0	.4	1.2

== Awards and honors ==
- Named Arizona Republic All-City first team in 2003
- Two-time East Valley Tribune Player of the Year (2003, 2004)
- Named Arizona Republic Player of the Year (2004)
- Selected all-state and all-region (2004)
- Gold medalist with the 2004 USA Junior World Championship Team
- Gold medalist with the 2004 USA Youth Development Festival West Team
- Gold medalist with the 2005 USA U-19 Basketball Team
- Won the team ball competition in the 2005 McDonald's All-American game
- Arizona Player of the Year (2005)
- Gatorade Arizona Player of the Year (2005)
- Named USA Today All-America Top 25 (2005)
- Street & Smith's and McDonald's All-America (2005)
- Named WBCA All-America honorable mention (2005)
- Earned All-Tournament honors at the 2006 VU Holiday Classic
- All-tournament honors at the 2007 Contra Costa Times Classic in Berkeley, California
- Most Valuable Player of the 2007 Vanderbilt Thanksgiving Tournament
- Named a first-team All-Southeastern Conference honoree (2008)
- Second-team recognition from the Associated Press (2008)
- Named preseason All-SEC by league coaches (first team) and writers (second team) (2008)
- Named to the CoSIDA Academic All-District IV third team (2008)
- All-Senior All-America First Team by the Lowe's Senior CLASS Award committee
- All-SEC Honors
- SEC Tournament Most Valuable Player
- SEC All-Tournament Team
- Honorable mention on the 2009 State Farm Coaches' All-America Team
- 2008-09 Vanderbilt women's Co-Athlete of the Year
- Inducted into the Chandler Sports Hall of Fame, 2010
