= 2008–09 Michigan State Spartans women's basketball team =

Intercollegiate basketball season

2008–09 Michigan State Spartans women's basketball

2009 NCAA Division I women's basketball tournament, Sweet Sixteen
- Conference: Big Ten Conference

Ranking
- Coaches: No. 22
- Head coach: Suzy Merchant
- Assistant coaches: Shane Clipfell; Rick Albro; Evelyn Thompson -
- Home arena: Breslin Center

The 2008–09 Michigan State Spartans women's basketball team represented Michigan State University in the 2008–09 NCAA Division I basketball season. The Spartans were coached by Suzy Merchant and played their home games at the Breslin Center.

== Exhibition ==
Date	Location	Opponent	Spartans points	Opp. points	Record
Nov. 2/08	East Lansing, MI	Green vs White Game			
Nov. 6/08	East Lansing, MI	Saginaw Valley State	97	32	1-0
Nov. 9/08	East Lansing, MI	Grand Valley State	84	44	2-0

== Regular season ==
- The season debut was a record breaking one as the Spartans defeated Niagara, 116-50. MSU set new program records in points scored, also a Breslin Center record, and margin of victory. The Spartans had six players on their roster to score in double-figures. This also tied a program record that was last accomplished on Nov. 24, 1990 against Georgetown. Redshirt junior Lauren Aitch led the way with a career-high 25 points in 21 minutes, shooting 10-of-11 from the field and 5-of-6 from the line. She also tied for the team-lead with eight rebounds. Freshman Courtney Schiffauer began her Spartan career by pouring in 21 points and tying Aitch for the team lead with eight rebounds. Schiffauer, whose 21 points was the most in a Spartan debut since Lindsay Bowen scored 26 back in 2002, was 9-of-12 from the field and sank both of her free throws.
- Nov. 23, 2008: Michigan State won the 2008 TD Banknorth Classic title with an 81-48 win over Quinnipiac at Patrick Gymnasium on the campus of University of Vermont. Junior Allyssa DeHaan poured in a season-high 21 points, becoming the 19th player in MSU history to top the 1,000-point plateau. The Spartans begin 5-0 for only the fourth time in team history and for the first time since 1999-00. DeHaan, who was 8-of-11 from the field, scored the fourth 3-pointer of her career, and went 4-of-4 from the free throw line. She was the fifth fastest Spartan to 1,000 points, needing only 75 games.

=== Roster ===
Number	Name	Height	Position	Class
45	Lauren Aitch	6-1	Center	Redshirt Junior
33	Taylor Alton	5-11	Guard-Forward	Freshman
41	Allyssa DeHaan	6-9	Center	Junior
54	Jasmine Holmes	5-10	Guard	Junior
22	Aisha Jefferson	6-1	Forward	Redshirt Junior
30	Lykendra Johnson	6-1	Forward	Redshirt Freshman
21	Mia Johnson	5-9	Guard	Redshirt Senior
32	Kalisha Keane	6-1	Forward	Sophomore
2	Mandy Piechowski	5-9	Guard	Junior
3	Porsche Poole	5-8	Guard	Freshman
24	Courtney Schiffauer	6-1	Forward	Freshman
20	Brittney Thomas	5-10	Guard	Sophomore
15	Cetera Washington	6-0	Forward	Sophomore
25	Tafa Wilson	6-1	Forward	Sophomore

=== Schedule ===
Date	Location	Opponent	Spartans points	Opp. points	Record
Nov. 14/08	East Lansing, MI	Niagara	116	50	1-0
Nov. 16/08	East Lansing, MI	Stony Brook	73	42	2-0
Nov. 19/08	East Lansing, MI	Detroit Mercy	85	48	3-0
Nov. 22/08	Burlington, VT	Dartmouth	60	52	4-0
Nov. 23/08	Burlington, VT	Quinnipiac	81	48	5-0
Nov. 26/08	East Lansing, MI	Old Dominion	78	48	6-0
Nov. 29/08	Notre Dame, IN	Notre Dame	72	78	6-1
Dec. 3/08	Atlanta, GA	Georgia Tech	57	70	6-2
Dec. 7/08	St. Bonaventure	St. Bonaventure	52	63	6-3
Dec. 14/08	Cincinnati	Xavier	66	71	6-4

== NCAA basketball tournament ==
- Berkeley Regional
  - Michigan State 60, Middle Tennessee 59
  - Michigan State 63, Duke 49
  - Iowa State 69, Michigan State 68
