= Seton Catholic Preparatory =

High school in Chandler, Arizona, United States

Location
- Chandler, Maricopa County, Arizona 85224; United States
- Coordinates: 33°19′25″N 111°52′39″W

Information
- Type: Private, coeducational
- Religious affiliation: Catholic
- Established: 1954
- Oversight: Diocese of Phoenix
- Principal: Victor Serna
- Grades: 9–12
- Enrollment: 547 (July 1, 2021)
- Colors: Red and gold
- Mascot: Sentinel
- Accreditation: North Central Association of Colleges and Schools; Western Catholic Educational Association
- Yearbook: The Sentinel
- Website: setoncatholic.org

Seton Catholic Preparatory is a college preparatory, co-educational Catholic high school in Chandler, Arizona, United States. Named after St. Elizabeth Ann Seton, the school was established in 1954 and is staffed by the Sisters of Charity of Seton Hill.

== History ==
Originally known as "Seton High School" or later as "Seton Catholic High School", the school opened in 1954 in downtown Chandler. Initially founded as a parish school, Seton began to operate under the supervision of the Diocese of Phoenix as a diocesan school beginning in 1973.

On September 12, 1980, a fire begun by one of the students destroyed much of the old campus, including eight classrooms in two buildings; the school would temporarily operate from the remaining classroom building, administration building, and gym. The fire, which caused $800,000 in damage, was found to have been started by three minors—one a student—after the latter got into an argument with a teacher. At the time of the fire, the school had 130 students.

After the fire, the school opted to relocate from downtown Chandler to a site more centrally located to serve the growing cities of Tempe, Mesa, and Chandler, which would allow the school to increase its enrollment. The school moved into the so-called Tri-City Campus in 1983 (and was even known as "Seton Catholic Tri-City High School" for a time in the 1980s); the former site was converted into a Boys and Girls Club. That fall, the school reached a then-all-time high for enrollment, 259 students.

Though Seton entered the 1990s at enrollment levels lower than any seen since the new campus, it jumped to 343 students in 1994, when it broke ground on a new gymnasium, and to 493 students—the highest in its history—by 1999. In the 1990s, the school also built six new science classrooms.

The 1990s and 2000s were times of similarly prolific growth in the East Valley. As the only Catholic high school located centrally enough to serve the area, Seton continued to reap rewards in enrollment growth. At its height, in the fall of 2004, Seton had 604 students—a school record. In 2008, following a massive undertaking to secure funds for the construction, the school completed its new copper-domed chapel, located on land that had housed the school's football field.

In May 2009, the school was officially renamed Seton Catholic Preparatory High School; the name was shortened to Seton Catholic Preparatory in 2014.

In February 2010, the school broke ground on a new, two-story academic building and black box theater complex, which opened to students in 2011.

== Notable alumni ==
- Rachel Campos-Duffy, conservative activist, political commentator and author
- Katie Hobbs, 24th Governor of Arizona, former Secretary of State of Arizona
