= Jimmy Bartolotta =

American basketball player (born 1986)

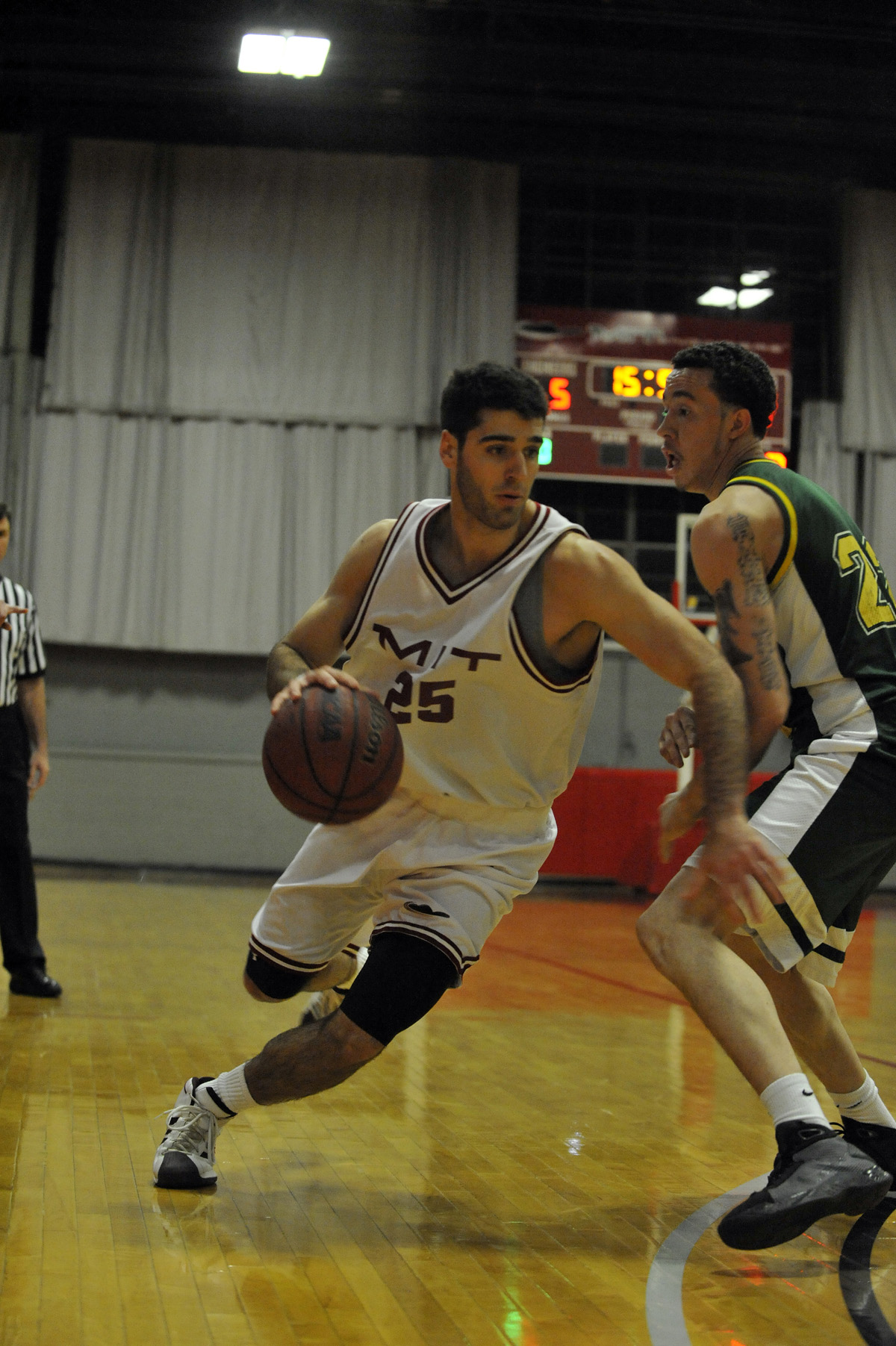

Personal information
- Born: October 27, 1986 (age 40) Englewood, Colorado, U.S.
- Listed height: 6 ft 4 in (1.93 m)
- Listed weight: 200 lb (91 kg)

Career information
- High school: Heritage (Littleton, Colorado)
- College: MIT (2005–2009)
- NBA draft: 2009: undrafted
- Position: Guard
- Number: 8, 25

Career history
- 2011–2012: ÍR Reykjavik

Career highlights
- NABC Division III Player of the Year (2009); Academic All-American of the Year (2009)

James Michael Bartolotta (born October 27, 1986) is an American former professional basketball player. He completed his collegiate career as the most decorated basketball player ever to play at MIT.

== High school ==
Bartolotta graduated in 2005 from Heritage High School (Littleton, Colorado). He earned Colorado All-State selections for basketball in both his junior and senior year. During his senior season Bartolotta led Heritage High to the big school Colorado 5A State Championship, a 27–1 record, and a 43rd ranking in the national high school poll. He also played doubles on the varsity tennis team where he and his partner finished 3rd in the state tournament.

Along with his athletic accolades, Bartolotta excelled in the classroom and was selected as the 2005 Denver Post/DAC Colorado Male Student-Athlete of the Year.

== College career ==
=== Freshman year ===
Bartolotta played and started in all 30 games during his freshman season. He was the second leading scorer for the 21–9 squad at 11.1 points per game. His 4.5 rebounds per game and 82% free throw mark helped the Engineers finish second in the New England Women's and Men's Athletic Conference (NEWMAC) regular and post season play. Bartolotta was part of an MIT sweep for post season conference awards as MIT coach Larry Anderson, senior Mike D'Auria, and Bartolotta were selected as the NEWMAC Coach, Player, and Rookie of the year respectively.

=== Sophomore year ===
In his second season, Bartolotta stepped into the lead role for the young Engineers as almost all of his statistics increased. He averaged 21.2 points, 8.7 rebounds, 4.2 assists, 1.9 steals, and 1.0 blocks per game as he split time at the point guard and shooting guard positions due to a season-ending injury of MIT's starting point guard, Bradley Gampel. Bartolotta's 86.6% free throw clip (162 for 187) was good enough for an MIT single season record and a national ranking of 25th. Bartolotta ranked in the top 15 of every NEWMAC statistical category during his second season of play.

Bartolotta finished tied for Player of the Year voting in the NEWMAC and was selected to the All-Conference first team and the Academic All-Conference team.

=== Junior year ===
During the 2007–2008 basketball campaign, Jimmy Bartolotta continued his stellar play in NEWMAC competition. From the shooting guard position, his 23.9 points per game scoring average was the 8th highest average in the country.

Bartolotta again finished tied for Player of the Year voting in the NEWMAC and was selected to the All-Conference first team and the Academic All-Conference Team. He also earned ESPN/CoSida First Team Academic All-American recognition and was one of 10 finalists for the prestigious Josten's Trophy which recognizes athletic, academic, and community service accomplishments.

=== Senior year ===
The 6'4" guard led the 2009 MIT Men's Basketball team to a 21–9 overall record, and 8–4 NEWMAC record. He had the nation's 2nd highest scoring average of 27.6 points per game his senior season.

Featured on ESPN as the "Cinderella Story" of the year, the team fought through an OT upset of nationally ranked Rhode Island College in the first round of NCAA play only to lose in a highly contested six point game to Farmingdale State in the second round of the tournament.

For being named the NABC National Player of the Year, Bartolotta was invited to play in the Hershey's/NABC Senior All-Star Game, at the site of the Division I Final Four at Ford Field in Detroit, MI. He is the only Division III player, and the only non-scholarship athlete, to compete in the event.

An outstanding student, as well as athlete, Bartolotta has seen much attention from the press during his career. He has been chronicled in the NY Times, the Boston Herald, the Boston Globe, ESPN, and the Denver Post, among others. He was also profiled and interviewed in the second half of the live broadcast of the 2009 NABC/Hershey's All-Star game on the CBS College Sports Channel on April 3, 2009.

Bartolotta completed his collegiate career as the most decorated basketball player ever to play at MIT. A four-year member of the Men's Basketball team, Bartolotta is the MIT and was the NEWMAC all-time leading scorer until 2017, finishing his career with 2,279 points.

=== MIT Statistics ===
| SEASON | GP | GS | MPG | FG% | 3P% | FT% | RPG | APG | SPG | BPG | PPG |
|---|---|---|---|---|---|---|---|---|---|---|---|
| 2005–06 | 30 | 30 | 22.7 | .474 | .389 | .821 | 4.5 | 1.2 | 0.63 | 0.27 | 11.1 |
| 2006–07 | 27 | 27 | 36.7 | .482 | .382 | .866 | 8.7 | 4.3 | 1.93 | 1.04 | 21.2 |
| 2007–08 | 24 | 24 | 35.0 | .533 | .415 | .805 | 5.8 | 4.0 | 2.33 | 0.96 | 23.9 |
| 2008–09 | 29 | 29 | 36.7 | .502 | .437 | .837 | 6.2 | 2.9 | 2.0 | 1.4 | 27.6 |
| Career | 110 | 110 | 32.5 | .501 | .413 | .837 | 6.2 | 3.0 | 1.6 | 0.91 | 20.7 |

=== College awards ===
- NEWMAC
  - Rookie of the Year, 2006.
  - All-Conference 1st Team, 2007, 2008, 2009.
  - Player of the Year, 2009.
  - Academic All-Conference Team, 2007, 2008, 2009.
- D3HOOPS
  - Northeast Region 1st Team, 2008, 2009.
  - Honorable Mention All-American, 2008.
  - All-American 1st Team, 2009.
  - National Player of the Year, 2009.
- ESPN
  - Academic All-District 1st Team, 2007, 2008, 2009.
  - Academic All-American 1st Team, 2008, 2009.
  - Academic All-American of the Year, 2009.
- NABC
  - Northeast Region 2nd Team, 2008.
  - Northeast Region 1st Team, 2009.
  - All-American 1st Team, 2009.
  - National Player of the Year, 2009.
- Josten's Trophy
  - Finalist, 2008, 2009.
  - Winner, 2009.

== Professional career ==
In June 2009, Bartolotta signed a 10-day contract with Serie A club Angelico Biella for the Italian Summer League. In October 2009, Bartolotta joined Air Avellino of the Serie A for a trial.

In December 2010, Bartolotta signed with ÍR of the Icelandic Úrvalsdeild karla, where he averaged 21.6 points and 3.6 assists in 14 regular season and playoff games. In the playoffs, ÍR was knocked out in the first round by Keflavík after losing the third and deciding game of the series in overtime. In September 2011 he resigned with ÍR for the 2011–2012 season. On October 30, Bartolotta broke his nose in a game against Grindavík after a collision with J'Nathan Bullock. In a midst of a disappointing season for ÍR, the club released him in end of January 2012. For the season he averaged 19.8 points and 2.8 assists and led the league in three-point accuracy by shooting 53.85% from three-point range.

== Personal life ==
Bartolotta is married to Abby Waner, who also played high school basketball in Colorado and then at Duke University.

== Sources ==
- ESPN
- Boston Herald
- NY Times
- Boston Globe
- Denver Post
- Icelandic statistics at kki.is
