= Jennifer Risper =

American professional basketball player (born 1987)

Personal information
- Born: March 11, 1987 (age 39) Moreno Valley, California, U.S.
- Listed height: 5 ft 9 in (1.75 m)
- Listed weight: 152 lb (69 kg)

Career information
- High school: Canyon Springs (Moreno Valley, California)
- College: Vanderbilt (2005–2009)
- WNBA draft: 2009: 3rd round, 29th overall pick
- Drafted by: Chicago Sky

Career highlights
- WBCA Defensive Player of the Year (2009); SEC Defensive Player of the Year (2009); 2× SEC All-Defensive Team (2008, 2009)
- Stats at Basketball Reference

Jennifer Risper (born March 11, 1987) is an American professional basketball player.

== Playing career ==
=== High school ===
Risper played high school basketball at Canyon Springs. As a senior, she averaged 15.3 points, 6.3 rebounds, 5.3 assists and 3.2 steals. She was named All-Ivy league and All-Riverside County First Team, along with the CIF Division 1A Co-Most Valuable Player. Other honors included Cal-Hi Sports All-State Third Team, and the L.A. Times All-Star Girls Basketball Team and the Press Enterprise First Team. In her junior year, she averaged 20.3 points, 6.7 rebounds, 3.9 assists and 3.6 steals per game. She was integral in leading Canyon Springs to CIF Div. 1A Southern Section Championship, Ivy League championship and runner-up finish in state championship. In her senior year, she led Canyon Springs to a 31–4 overall record including a school record 25-game winning streak and a perfect 10–0 record in the Ivy League. She lettered all four years in basketball and served as team captain for three years. When she was recruited, she selected Vanderbilt over Texas and Oregon State.

=== Vanderbilt ===
Risper was a two-time Second Team All-SEC Pick for the Commodores. In her sophomore year, she was Vanderbilt's representative on the 2007–08 SEC Women's Basketball Good Works Team. Her senior year, she was named the WBCA National Defensive Player of the Year.

=== Chicago Sky ===
Risper was selected in the third round, 29th overall, in the 2009 WNBA Draft, by the Chicago Sky. Jennifer Risper’s first WNBA preseason game was a May 22 Sky win over the defending WNBA champion Detroit Shock. Risper played 11 minutes and scored three points. On May 28, Risper and the Sky played against an Indiana Fever squad including her former teammate, Christina Wirth. In the 67–74 loss, Risper played 9 minutes, had 3 Free Throws, 5 Rebounds, 1 Steal, and 3 points. Before the end of training camp, Risper was cut by the Sky.

=== Europe ===
In the fall of 2009, Risper and her former teammate Wirth both signed with a Slovakian team officially known as BK PU Bemaco Prešov. The season is scheduled to end in April 2010.

=== Indiana Fever ===
Risper signed a 2010 training camp contract with the Indiana Fever.

== Vanderbilt statistics ==
Legend
GP	Games played	GS	Games started	MPG	Minutes per game
FG%	Field goal percentage	3P%	3-point field goal percentage	FT%	Free throw percentage
RPG	Rebounds per game	APG	Assists per game	SPG	Steals per game
BPG	Blocks per game	PPG	Points per game	**Bold**	Career high

Year	Team	GP	Points	FG%	3P%	FT%	RPG	APG	SPG	BPG	PPG
2005–06	Vanderbilt	20	54	41.5	**50.0**	56.5	1.6	1.3	0.7	–	2.7
2006–07	Vanderbilt	32	174	46.0	30.0	**79.2**	3.3	1.9	1.1	0.1	5.4
2007–08	Vanderbilt	34	322	48.9	20.0	76.4	**6.3**	2.7	**2.7**	0.1	**9.5**
2008–09	Vanderbilt	**35**	**326**	**50.4**	–	74.8	5.7	**2.8**	2.3	0.1	9.3
Career	Vanderbilt	121	876	48.4	31.0	75.1	4.5	2.3	1.8	0.1	7.2

== Awards and honors ==
- 2008–09 Vanderbilt women's Co-Athletes of the Year
- Women's Basketball Coaches Association (WBCA), National Defensive Player of the Year (2009)
- SEC All-Tournament Team (2009)
- SEC All-Defensive Team (2008)
- Second-team All-Southeastern Conference honoree (2008)
- Vanderbilt Thanksgiving All-Tournament Team (2008).
- All-tournament honors at the 2007 Contra Costa Times in Berkeley, California
- All-tournament selection (2007 Vanderbilt Thanksgiving Tournament.)
- Female Newcomer of the Year honors among all Vanderbilt student-athletes (2006)
