= 2009 NCAA Division I women's basketball tournament =

American college basketball tournament

- Teams: 64
- Finals site: Scottrade Center, St. Louis, Missouri
- Champions: Connecticut Huskies (6th title, 6th title game, 10th Final Four)
- Runner-up: Louisville Cardinals (1st title game, 1st Final Four)
- Semifinalists: Oklahoma Sooners (2nd Final Four); Stanford Cardinal (8th Final Four)
- Winning coach: Geno Auriemma (6th title)
- MOP: Tina Charles (Connecticut)

The 2009 NCAA Division I women's basketball tournament commenced 21 March 2009 and concluded 7 April 2009 when the University of Connecticut Huskies defeated the Louisville Cardinals 76–54.

Michigan State's upset over Duke in the second round would be the last time until 2023 that all four 1 seeds did not progress to at least the Sweet Sixteen.

== Subregionals ==
2009 NCAA subregionals

Once again, the system is the same as the Division I men's basketball tournament, with the exception that only 64 teams went and there was no play-in game. Automatic bids were secured by 31 conference champions and 33 at-large bids.

The subregionals, which used the "pod system", keeping most teams either at or close to the home cities, was held from 21 March to 24 at sixteen sites. The following were chosen in July 2006, prior to the re-expansion of the subregional sites from eight to sixteen:

- The Pit, Albuquerque, New Mexico (Host: University of New Mexico)
- Pete Maravich Assembly Center, Baton Rouge, Louisiana (Host: Louisiana State University)
- Nationwide Arena, Columbus, Ohio (Host: The Ohio State University)
- Comcast Center, College Park, Maryland (Host: University of Maryland, College Park)
- Arena at Gwinnett Center, Duluth, Georgia (Host: University of Georgia)
- United Spirit Arena, Lubbock, Texas (Host: Texas Tech University)
- Galen Center, Los Angeles (Host: University of Southern California)
- Louis Brown Athletic Center, Piscataway, New Jersey (Host: Rutgers University)

As per the return to the 16-site subregional format, the following sites were added in 2008:

- E. A. Diddle Arena, Bowling Green, Kentucky (Host: Western Kentucky University)
- Jack Breslin Student Events Center, East Lansing, Michigan (Host: Michigan State University)
- Carver–Hawkeye Arena, Iowa City, Iowa (Host: University of Iowa)
- Edmund P. Joyce Center, South Bend, Indiana (Host: University of Notre Dame)
- Bank of America Arena at Hec Edmundson Pavilion, Seattle (Host: University of Washington)
- Cox Arena, San Diego (Host: San Diego State University)
- Harry A. Gampel Pavilion, Storrs, Connecticut (Host: University of Connecticut)
- McKenzie Arena, Chattanooga, Tennessee (Host: University of Tennessee at Chattanooga)

== Regionals ==
2009 NCAA Regionals and Final Four

The regionals, held in the city rather than the geographic area as a practice that has been used since 2005, were held there from 28 March to 31 at these sites:

- Trenton Regional: Sovereign Bank Arena, Trenton, New Jersey (Hosts: Metro Atlantic Athletic Conference and Rider University).
- Raleigh Regional: RBC Center, Raleigh, North Carolina (Host: North Carolina State University).
- Oklahoma City Regional: Ford Center, Oklahoma City (Host: Big 12 Conference).
- Berkeley Regional: Haas Pavilion, Berkeley, California (Hosts: University of California, Berkeley and Pac-10 Conference).

The regional winners advanced to the Final Four, held 5 and 7 April 2009 at the Scottrade Center, in St. Louis, Missouri, hosted by the Missouri Valley Conference.

== Tournament records ==
- Three-pointers—Iowa State hit 16 three-point field goals in a first-round game against East Tennessee State, tied for the most number of three-point shots completed in an NCAA Tournament game.
- Three-pointers—South Dakota State hit 16 three-point field goals in a first-round game against TCU, tied for the most number of three-point shots completed in an NCAA Tournament game.
- Three-pointers—Connecticut hit 47 three-point field goals, tied for the most number of three-point shots completed in an NCAA Tournament.

== Qualifying teams – automatic ==
Sixty-four teams were selected to participate in the 2009 NCAA Tournament. Thirty-one conferences were eligible for an automatic bid to the 2009 NCAA tournament.

Automatic bids
		Record		
Qualifying School	Conference	Regular Season	Conference	Seed
Austin Peay State University	Ohio Valley Conference	17–15	10–8	16
Ball State University	MAC	25–8	14–2	12
Baylor University	Big 12 Conference	27–5	12–4	2
University of North Carolina at Charlotte	Atlantic 10	23–8	13–1	11
University of Connecticut	Big East	33–0	16–0	1
Dartmouth College	Ivy League	18–10	13–1	16
Drexel University	Colonial	24–8	16–2	12
East Tennessee State University	Atlantic Sun Conference	20–10	16–4	13
University of Evansville	Missouri Valley Conference	15–18	4–14	15
California State University, Fresno	WAC	24–8	12–4	13
Gonzaga University	West Coast Conference	26–6	12–2	12
University of Wisconsin–Green Bay	Horizon League	29–3	18–0	11
Lehigh University	Patriot League	26–6	12–2	15
Liberty University	Big South Conference	24–8	15–1	14
Marist College	MAAC	29–3	16–2	12
University of Maryland, College Park	ACC	28–4	12–2	1
Middle Tennessee State University	Sun Belt Conference	28–5	17–1	8
University of Montana	Big Sky Conference	28–4	15–1	13
North Carolina A&T	MEAC	26–6	15–1	14
Ohio State University	Big Ten	27–5	15–3	3
Prairie View A&M University	SWAC	23–10	17–1	16
Sacred Heart University	Northeast Conference	25–7	18–0	14
South Dakota State University	The Summit League	31–2	17–1	7
Stanford University	Pac-10	29–4	17–1	2
University of California, Santa Barbara	Big West Conference	22–9	15–1	15
University of Central Florida	Conference USA	17–16	11–5	14
University of Utah	Mountain West	22–9	13–3	9
University of Texas at San Antonio	Southland	24–8	14–2	15
Vanderbilt University	SEC	24–8	10–4	4
University of Vermont	America East	21–11	12–4	16
Western Carolina University	Southern Conference	21–11	14–6	13

== Qualifying teams – at-large ==
Thirty-three additional teams were selected to complete the sixty-four invitations.

At-large Bids
		Record		
Qualifying School	Conference	Regular Season	Conference	Seed
Arizona State University	Pacific-10	23–8	15–3	6
Auburn University	Southeastern	29–3	12–2	2
University of California, Berkeley	Pacific-10	25–6	15–3	4
DePaul University	Big East	23–9	10–6	7
Duke University	Atlantic Coast	26–5	11–3	1
University of Florida	Southeastern	23–7	9–5	8
Florida State University	Atlantic Coast	25–7	12–2	3
University of Georgia	Southeastern	18–13	7–7	11
Georgia Tech	Atlantic Coast	21–9	8–6	9
University of Iowa	Big Ten	21–10	13–5	8
Iowa State	Big 12	24–8	11–5	4
Kansas State	Big 12	24–7	10–6	5
Louisville	Big East	29–4	14–2	3
LSU	Southeastern	18–10	10–4	6
Michigan State University	Big Ten	20–10	13–5	9
Minnesota	Big Ten	19–11	11–7	10
Mississippi State University	Southeastern	22–9	8–6	11
University of North Carolina	Atlantic Coast	27–6	10–4	3
University of Notre Dame	Big East	22–8	10–6	7
University of Oklahoma	Big 12	28–4	15–1	1
University of Pittsburgh	Big East	23–7	12–4	4
Purdue University	Big Ten	22–10	13–5	6
Rutgers University	Big East	19–12	9–7	7
San Diego State University	Mountain West	23–7	13–3	10
TCU	Mountain West	20–10	12–4	10
Temple University	Atlantic 10	21–9	11–3	9
University of Tennessee	Southeastern	22–10	9–5	5
University of Texas at Austin	Big 12	21–11	8–8	6
Texas A&M University	Big 12	25–7	11–5	2
VCU	Colonial	26–6	15–3	10
Villanova University	Big East	19–13	10–6	8
University of Virginia	Atlantic Coast	23–9	8–6	5
Xavier University	Atlantic 10	25–6	13–1	5

== Tournament seeds ==
Trenton RegionalSovereign Bank Arena, Trenton, New Jersey
Seed	School	Conference	Record	Berth type
1	Connecticut	Big East	33–0	Automatic
2	Texas A&M	Big 12	25–7	At-large
3	Florida State	ACC	25–7	At-large
4	California	Pac-10	25–6	At-large
5	Virginia	ACC	23–9	At-large
6	Arizona State	Pac-10	23–8	At-large
7	Notre Dame	Big East	22–8	At-large
8	Florida	SEC	23–7	At-large
9	Temple	Atlantic 10	21–9	At-large
10	Minnesota	Big 10	19–11	At-large
11	Georgia	SEC	18–13	At-large
12	Marist	MAAC	29–3	Automatic
13	Fresno State	WAC	24–8	Automatic
14	North Carolina A&T	MEAC	26–6	Automatic
15	Evansville	Missouri Valley	15–18	Automatic
16	Vermont	America East	21–11	Automatic

Raleigh RegionalRBC Center, Raleigh, North Carolina
Seed	School	Conference	Record	Berth type
1	Maryland	ACC	28–4	Automatic
2	Baylor	Big 12	27–5	Automatic
3	Louisville	Big East	29–4	At-large
4	Vanderbilt	SEC	24–8	Automatic
5	Kansas State	Big 12	24–7	At-large
6	LSU	SEC	18–10	At-large
7	South Dakota State	Summit	31–2	Automatic
8	Villanova	Big East	19–13	At-large
9	Utah	Mountain West	22–9	Automatic
10	TCU	Mountain West	20–10	At-large
11	Green Bay	Horizon	29–3	Automatic
12	Drexel	CAA	24–8	Automatic
13	Western Carolina	Southern	21–11	Automatic
14	Liberty	Big South	24–8	Automatic
15	UTSA	Southland	24–8	Automatic
16	Dartmouth	Ivy	18–10	Automatic

Berkeley RegionalHaas Pavilion, Berkeley, California
Seed	School	Conference	Record	Berth type
1	Duke	ACC	26–5	At-large
2	Stanford	Pac-10	29–4	Automatic
3	Ohio State	Big 10	27–5	Automatic
4	Iowa State	Big 12	24–8	At-large
5	Tennessee	SEC	22–10	At-large
6	Texas	Big 12	21–11	At-large
7	DePaul	Big East	23–9	At-large
8	Middle Tennessee State	Sun Belt	28–5	Automatic
9	Michigan State	Big Ten	20–10	At-large
10	San Diego State	Mountain West	23–7	At-large
11	Mississippi State	SEC	22–9	At-large
12	Ball State	MAC	25–8	Automatic
13	East Tennessee State	Atlantic Sun	20–10	Automatic
14	Sacred Heart	Northeast	25–7	Automatic
15	UCSB	Big West	22–9	Automatic
16	Austin Peay	Ohio Valley	17–15	Automatic

Oklahoma City RegionalFord Center, Oklahoma City, Oklahoma
Seed	School	Conference	Record	Berth type
1	Oklahoma	Big 12	28–4	At-large
2	Auburn	SEC	29–3	At-large
3	North Carolina	ACC	27–6	At-large
4	Pittsburgh	Big East	23–7	At-large
5	Xavier	Atlantic 10	25–6	At-large
6	Purdue	Big 10	22–10	At-large
7	Rutgers	Big East	19–12	At-large
8	Iowa	Big 10	21–10	At-large
9	Georgia Tech	ACC	21–9	At-large
10	VCU	CAA	26–6	At-large
11	Charlotte	Atlantic 10	23–8	Automatic
12	Gonzaga	West Coast	26–6	Automatic
13	Montana	Big Sky	28–4	Automatic
14	UCF	Conference USA	17–16	Automatic
15	Lehigh	Patriot	26–6	Automatic
16	Prairie View A&M	SWAC	23–10	Automatic

== Bids by conference ==
Thirty-one conferences earned an automatic bid. In twenty-two cases, the automatic bid was the only representative from the conference. Thirty-three additional at-large teams were selected from nine of the conferences.

Bids	Conference	Teams
7	Big East	Connecticut, DePaul, Louisville, Notre Dame, Pittsburgh, Rutgers, Villanova
7	Southeastern	Vanderbilt, Auburn, Florida, Georgia, LSU, Mississippi St., Tennessee
6	Atlantic Coast	Maryland, Duke, Florida St., Georgia Tech, North Carolina, Virginia
6	Big 12	Baylor, Iowa State, Kansas State, Oklahoma, Texas, Texas A&M
5	Big Ten	Ohio State, Iowa, Michigan State, Minnesota, Purdue
3	Atlantic 10	Charlotte, Temple, Xavier
3	Mountain West	Utah, San Diego State, TCU
3	Pacific-10	Stanford, Arizona State, California
2	Colonial	Drexel, VCU
1	America East	Vermont
1	Atlantic Sun	East Tennessee State
1	Big Sky	Montana
1	Big South	Liberty
1	Big West	UC Santa Barbara
1	Conference USA	UCF
1	Horizon	Green Bay
1	Ivy	Dartmouth
1	Metro Atlantic	Marist
1	Mid-American	Ball State
1	Mid-Eastern	North Carolina A&T
1	Missouri Valley	Evansville
1	Northeast	Sacred Heart
1	Ohio Valley	Austin Peay
1	Patriot	Lehigh
1	Southern	Western Carolina
1	Southland	UTSA
1	Southwestern	Prairie View
1	Summit	South Dakota State
1	Sun Belt	Middle Tennessee State
1	West Coast	Gonzaga
1	Western Athletic	Fresno State

== Bids by state ==
The sixty-four teams came from thirty-two states. Texas had the most teams with six bids. Eighteen states did not have any teams receiving bids.

NCAA Women's basketball Tournament invitations by state 2009

Bids	State	Teams
6	Texas	Baylor, Prairie View, UTSA, TCU, Texas, Texas A&M
5	California	Fresno State, Stanford, UC Santa Barbara, California, San Diego State
5	North Carolina	Charlotte, North Carolina A&T, Western Carolina, Duke, North Carolina
5	Pennsylvania	Drexel, Lehigh, Pittsburgh, Temple, Villanova
5	Tennessee	Austin Peay, East Tennessee State, Middle Tennessee State, Vanderbilt, Tennessee
4	Indiana	Ball State, Evansville, Notre Dame, Purdue
3	Florida	UCF, Florida, Florida State
3	Virginia	Liberty, VCU, Virginia
2	Connecticut	Connecticut, Sacred Heart
2	Georgia	Georgia, Georgia Tech
2	Iowa	Iowa, Iowa State
2	Ohio	Ohio State, Xavier
1	Alabama	Auburn
1	Arizona	Arizona State
1	Illinois	DePaul
1	Kansas	Kansas State
1	Kentucky	Louisville
1	Louisiana	LSU
1	Maryland	Maryland
1	Michigan	Michigan State
1	Minnesota	Minnesota
1	Mississippi	Mississippi State
1	Montana	Montana
1	New Hampshire	Dartmouth
1	New Jersey	Rutgers
1	New York	Marist
1	Oklahoma	Oklahoma
1	South Dakota	South Dakota State
1	Utah	Utah
1	Vermont	Vermont
1	Washington	Gonzaga
1	Wisconsin	Green Bay

== Game summaries ==
=== Berkeley Region ===
==== First round ====
Second seeded Stanford easily beat the 15th seeded Gauchos of UC Santa Barbara behind a double-double by Jayne Appel. Third seeded Ohio State beat Sacred Heart by 14 points, but led by only two well into the second half. Freshman guard Samantha Prahalis scored 23 to help lead the Buckeyes to victory. Tenth seeded San Diego State upset seventh seeded DePaul behind Jene Morris's career tying 35 points. Eleventh seed Mississippi State used 21 of 22 free throw shooting to upset the sixth seeded Texas Longhorns. Middle Tennessee's Alysha Clark, the nations D1 scoring leader, scored 34 points, but it wasn't enough to defeat ninth seeded Michigan State, who broke a late tie and held on to win by one point. One seeded Duke easily disposed of sixteen seeded Austin Peay. Fourth seeded Iowa State tied an NCAA tournament record with 16 three-point goals in an easy win over thirteen seed East Tennessee State.

Twelfth seeded Ball State upset defending national champion Tennessee, which had never lost an opening game in the tournament before. Tennessee has been in every one of the 29 NCAA Tournaments, and prior to this year, had never failed to make the Sweet Sixteen.

==== Second round ====
Third seeded Ohio State narrowly defeated eleventh seeded Mississippi State 64–58. OSU held MSU scoreless for the last 6:43 of the game. Second seeded Stanford beat San Diego State by 28, but the game was tied 8 minutes into the game. Stanford's Nneka Ogwumike had career highs of 27 points and 13 rebounds.

Ninth seeded Michigan State upsets top-seeded Duke on the home floor of Michigan State, in a match up between Duke head coach Joanne P. McCallie and her former team. Michigan State shot under 40% from the floor, but held Duke to under 27%. Twelfth seeded Ball State stayed with Iowa State for 30 minutes, but couldn't maintain the pace. Iowa State extended a four-point lead to win 71–57.

==== Regional semifinals (Sweet Sixteen) ====
Fourth seeded Iowa State beat ninth seeded Michigan State by a single point. MSU had a seven-point lead with 1:26 to go, but the Cyclones scored the final eight points of the game. They took the lead on a three-point shot by Alison Lacey for three of her 29 points. The Spartans had a chance to retake the lead, but missed their last three shots.

Two seed Stanford beat Ohio State behind Jayne Appel's double-double. OSU freshman Samantha Prahalis scored 19, but it wasn't enough to overcome the Cardinal shooting.

==== Regional final (Elite Eight) ====
Two seed Stanford easily beat four seed Iowa State behind Jayne Appel's 46 points. Jayne's 46 points sets a new school record and places her in the NCAA Tournament record book with the third highest point total in NCAA tournament history. Appel's 27 first half points exceeded the first half total for Iowa State.

=== Oklahoma City Region ===
==== First round ====
Third seeded North Carolina beat Fourteenth seeded Central Florida. UNC had a 14-point lead with 30 seconds left in the game, but UCF scored the final nine points of the game to make the final margin five points. Second seeded Auburn easily beat fifteen seed Lehigh, behind DeWanna Bonner's 26 points. Sixth seeded Purdue beat eleventh seeded Charlotte to win their twelfth consecutive first-round game. Fourth seeded Pittsburgh beat thirteenth seeded Montana behind Shavonte Zellous's 31 points. Twelfth seeded Gonzaga upset fifth seed Xavier, giving the Bulldogs their first ever NCAA Tournament win. Seventh seeded Rutgers beat Virginia Commonwealth to spoil VCU's NCAA Tournament debut. Top seeded Oklahoma struggled early, but ended up winning easily over Prairie View A&M. Ninth seeded Georgia Tech, playing without leading scorer Alex Montgomery, beat eighth seeded Iowa.

==== Second round ====
Seventh seeded Rutgers upsets second seeded Auburn. Playing on their home court, the Scarlet Knights scored the first nine points and lead 13–2 at the first media timeout. Rutgers held Auburn to 29% shooting and ended the game with a 28-point margin.

Fourth seeded Pittsburgh and twelfth seeded Gonzaga were tied at halftime, and with three and a half minutes to go in the game, but the Panthers outscored the Bulldogs in the final minutes to win by five.

Sixth seeded Purdue upsets third seeded North Carolina. Purdue had lost its last three games to UNC, but hit 57% of the field goals to win by fifteen.

Top seeded Oklahoma held Georgia Tech to 27% shooting in a win that advanced the Sooners to a Sweet Sixteen game in Oklahoma City.

==== Regional semifinals (Sweet Sixteen) ====
Sixth seeded Purdue holds off a determined Rutgers team. The Scarlet Knights fell behind early but came back to within two with less than two minutes remaining. Purdue shot 55% in the first half, ending with over 52% shooting.

Top seeded Oklahoma beat fourth seed Pittsburgh. Whitney Hand had a career-high 22 points, which helped overcome foul trouble for Courtney Paris. All five Sooner starters scored in double digits.

==== Regional final (Elite Eight) ====
Oklahoma beat Purdue to advance to their second ever Final Four. Courtney Paris had 19 points, 13 rebounds and six blocks, while Danielle Robinson scored 23 points to lead the team over the Boilermakers. Purdue had three players in double-figures, led by Lindsay Wisdom-Hylton with 20, but it wasn't enough.

=== Raleigh Region ===
==== First round ====
Fourth seeded Vanderbilt beat Western Carolina. Fifth seeded Kansas State beat Drexel. Shalee Lehning tied a career high with 13 assists. Seventh seeded South Dakota State tied an NCAA record with 16 three-point goals to help beat the Horned Frogs of TCU. Ninth seed Utah overwhelmed Villanova, winning by 30. Top seeded Maryland easily beat Dartmouth. Kristi Toliver had as many points at halftime (23) as Dartmouth. Sixth-seeded LSU beats Wisconsin-Green Bay behind Allison Hightower's career-best 26 points.

Second seeded Baylor needed overtime to prevail against fifteen seed UTSA. Head coach Kim Mulkey was not at the game, having been hospitalized earlier in the day due to a reaction to medication. Third seeded Louisville forced 27 turnovers in a win over Liberty.

==== Second round ====
Fourth seeded Vanderbilt beat fifth seeded Kansas State behind a career-high 27 points by Jennifer Risper, and 24 points by Christina Wirth. Kansas State held a one-point lead at halftime, but Vanderbilt scored eleven consecutive points in a second half run to take a lead they would not relinquish.

Second seeded Baylor beats South Dakota State on a last second shot. Kelli Griffin scored with 0.5 seconds remaining in the game to break a 58–58 tie, and move the Bears into the regional semi-final.

Marissa Coleman has 18 points and 18 rebounds to lead top seeded Maryland over Utah on their home floor. Over ten thousand fans watched Maryland win its 35th consecutive game at home.

Third seeded Louisville beat LSU on LSU's home floor. LSU had won twelve consecutive victories on their home floor. LSU's will not advance to the Final Four, ending an NCAA record-tying streak of five consecutive appearances. The win was the 31st of the year for Louisville, a school record.

==== Regional semifinals (Sweet Sixteen) ====
Three seed Louisville holds two seed Baylor to 39 points, in a surprisingly easy upset. Both Angel McCoughtry and Candyce Bingham had double-doubles to help lead the Cardinals to the first regional championship game in school history.

Top seed Maryland survived a challenge from fourth seeded Vanderbilt. The Commodores started strong with an opening 12–2, which they extended to a 33–15 margin with six minutes left in the first half. Vanderbilt's Christina Wirth had a career-high 28 points, but it wasn't enough as Maryland's Marissa Coleman scored 42. Coleman scored the basket to give Maryland the lead with just under 30 seconds left in the game, and the clinching free throws.

==== Regional final (Elite Eight) ====
Third seeded Louisville knocks off top-seeded Maryland to head to their first ever Final Four. Angel McCoughtry had a double-double to lead the Cardinals to the win. Maryland hurt themselves with 21 turnovers. Louisville head coach Jeff Walz was a former assistant coach of Maryland.

=== Trenton Region ===
==== First round ====
Fifth seed Virginia trailed at halftime, but came back to beat Marist. Sixth seeded Arizona State beat Georgia, despite playing without injured Dymond Simon. Third seeded Florida State had five players in double figure, helping win over North Carolina A&T. Fourth seeded California beats Fresno State. Top seed Connecticut easily beat Vermont behind Tina Charles's 32 points on 13–14 from the field.

Eighth seeded Florida beats Temple for its 24th win of the year, tying a school record. Second seeded Texas A&M forces 30 turnovers in a win over Evansville. Tenth seeded Minnesota upsets Notre Dame.

==== Second round ====
Sixth seeded Arizona State's Danielle Orsillo hit a three-pointer with 32 seconds left to break a 54–54 tie. ASU hung on to upset third seeded Florida State.

Fourth seeded California won easily over fifth seeded Virginia. Ashley Walker tied a career high with 32 points, while Devanei Hampton and Alexis Gray-Lawson each added 22 points.

Second seeded Texas A&M beat tenth seeded Minnesota behind a season-high 20 steals. The Aggies forced 32 turnovers to beat the Gophers by 31.

Top seeded Connecticut beat eighth seeded Florida. Renee Montgomery, playing on her home court for the last time in her career, scored 25. The win moves Connecticut in the Sweet Sixteen for the 16th consecutive time, the longest active streak.

==== Regional semifinals (Sweet Sixteen) ====
Connecticut faced their largest deficit of the year (eight points) against California, and went into halftime with only a two-point margin. UConn outscored California by 40–12, starting at the time of the eight-point deficit, to take control of the game. UConn's Tiffany Hayes had a career-high 28 points, shooting 9–10 from the field, including 5–6 from beyond the three-point arc.

Sixth seeded Arizona State upsets two seed Texas A&M. Briann January and Danielle Orsillo were both perfect from the floor, helping the Sun Devils to a season-high 62 percent shooting percentage. The Texas &M team was also shooting well, hitting 55% of their first 29 shots. They were within three as late as 7:12 left in the game, but ASU outscored them and ended with a fifteen-point margin.

==== Regional final (Elite Eight) ====
Top-seeded Connecticut beat Arizona State to advance to their tenth Final Four. The game was close early – UConn led at one point 20–19, but UConn went on a 9–2 run to open up the margin. After a score by ASU, Maya Moore scored the next five points, which broke the single-season scoring record held by Kara Wolters. Kara was sitting courtside, doing commentary for a Connecticut radio station. The Sun Devils got to within eight at one point in the second half, but Moore and Montgomery combined for eight consecutive points to stretch the lead to 16. ASU would not get within double digits again.

=== Final Four ===
Two very different games in terms of Final Four experience. In the first game, Oklahoma is in only its second Final Four (the first in 2002) and Louisville is making its first ever Final Four.

Only four coaches in NCAA history have multiple NCAA championships, and two of them, Tara VanDerveer and Geno Auriemma, coach the second game.

==== Louisville versus Oklahoma ====
Louisville plays the role of newcomer to the Final Four by missing its first 13 shots. Over seven minutes into the game, Louisville has taken their second full timeout, has yet to hit a basket, and is losing 16–2. Louisville shook off the opening jitters and began scoring. Just after the final media timeout of the first half, two Angel McCoughtry free throws would cut the lead to six, but Oklahoma would outscore Louisville 10–4 to take a twelve-point lead into the half.

The second half would open up almost a mirror image of the first half. Louisville outscored Oklahoma 15–1 to take their first lead. Oklahoma did not get a basket until more than seven minutes had elapsed. The game would stay close from then on, with never more than a six-point margin by either team. With 18 seconds left in the game Courtney Paris would hit a basket to bring the margin to one. After Candyce Bingham hit one of two free throws, Nyeshia Stevenson took a three-point shot with two seconds left in the game. Her shot rimmed out, and Louisville hung on to win 61–59.

==== Stanford versus Connecticut ====
Connecticut entered the game having won its last 37 games, but their opponent Stanford was the last team to have beaten them. Just over nine minutes into the game, Stanford led 14–13. Jayne Appel scored ten of Stanford's 14 points, and assisted on one of the other two baskets. Then Renee Montgomery scored nine of UConn's next eleven points and assisted on the other basket in the stretch. Maya Moore added five points, part of an 18–4 run to bring the score to 31–18. Connecticut entered the halftime break with a 13-point lead, one more than they had had the last time they had played a Final Four game in St. Louis: a 2001 game in which, despite the large halftime lead, Notre Dame went to win the game and the Championship.

This time was different however. Connecticut scored the first eleven points of the second half, to double up Stanford 48–24. Connecticut led by at least 20 until the last five minutes and won 81–64. Jayne Appel matched Renee Montgomery for high scoring honors with 26, but Connecticut also got 24 from Maya Moore.

==== Championship game – Louisville versus Connecticut ====
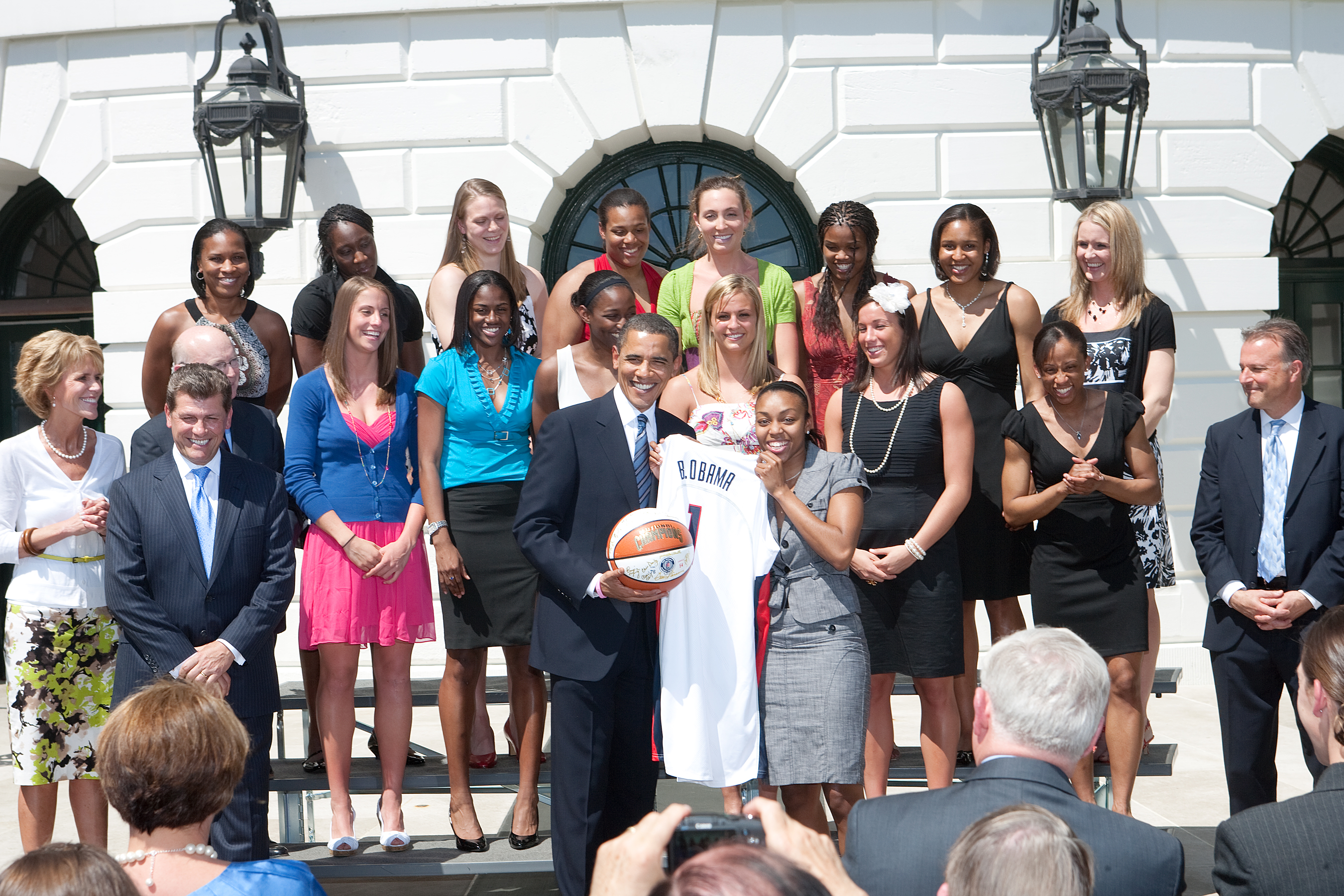
The players, coaches, and other staff of the 2008–2009 UConn Huskies, winners of the 2009 national championship, are honored at the White House by President Barack Obama on 27 April 2009.

Louisville would meet Connecticut for the third time in the season, but it would be the first ever all Big East Championship game. UConn prevailed in the first meeting by 28 points, and won by 39 in the Big East Tournament Championship game.

Angel McCoughtry tried to change the outcome this time, scoring eleven of Louisville's first 15 points, and assisting on two others, to take a 15–13 lead just over eight minutes into the game. UConn began feeding Tina Charles, who helped pull them to a 14-point lead 39–24, at halftime.

Tina would end the game with 25 points, 19 rebounds, and a trophy for the Most Outstanding Player of the Tournament. Connecticut hit 50% of their field goal tries, holding Louisville to just under 31%.

Connecticut won 76–54, winning its sixth National Championship, and completing its third perfect season. They would win every game by double digits for the first time in NCAA history.

== Brackets ==
Results to date

* – Denotes overtime period

=== Trenton Regional – Trenton, New Jersey ===
First round 21–22 March 2009
1	Connecticut	104
16	Vermont	65
Storrs, Connecticut
8	Florida	70
9	Temple	57
5	Virginia	68
12	Marist	61
Los Angeles, California
4	California	70
13	Fresno St.	47
6	Arizona St.	58
11	Georgia	47
Duluth, Georgia
3	Florida St.	83
14	North Carolina A&T	71
7	Notre Dame	71
10	Minnesota	79
South Bend, Indiana
2	Texas A&M	80
15	Evansville	45

Second round 23–24 March 2009
1	Connecticut	87
8	Florida	59
5	Virginia	73
4	California	99
6	Arizona St.	63
3	Florida St.	58
10	Minnesota	42
2	Texas A&M	73

Regional semifinals 29 March 2009
1	Connecticut	77
4	California	53
6	Arizona St.	84
2	Texas A&M	69

Regional finals 31 March 2009
1	Connecticut	83
6	Arizona St.	64

=== Berkeley Regional – Berkeley, California ===
First round 21–22 March 2009
1	Duke	83
16	Austin Peay	42
East Lansing, Michigan
8	Middle Tenn.	59
9	Michigan St.	60
5	Tennessee	55
12	Ball St.	71
Bowling Green, Kentucky
4	Iowa St.	85
13	East Tenn. St.	53
6	Texas	63
11	Mississippi St.	71
Columbus, Ohio
3	Ohio St.	77
14	Sacred Heart	63
7	DePaul	70
10	San Diego St.	76
San Diego, California
2	Stanford	74
15	UCSB	39

Second round 23–24 March 2009
1	Duke	49
9	Michigan St.	63
12	Ball St.	57
4	Iowa St.	71
11	Mississippi St.	58
3	Ohio St.	64
10	San Diego St.	49
2	Stanford	77

Regional semifinals 28 March 2009
9	Michigan St.	68
4	Iowa St.	69
3	Ohio St.	66
2	Stanford	84

Regional finals 30 March 2009
4	Iowa St.	53
2	Stanford	74

=== Raleigh Regional – Raleigh, North Carolina ===
First round 21–22 March 2009
1	Maryland	82
16	Dartmouth	53
College Park, Maryland
8	Villanova	30
9	Utah	60
5	Kansas St.	68
12	Drexel	44
Albuquerque, New Mexico
4	Vanderbilt	73
13	Western Carolina	44
6	LSU	69
11	Green Bay	59
Baton Rouge, Louisiana
3	Louisville	62
14	Liberty	42
7	South Dakota St.	90
10	TCU	55
Lubbock, Texas
2	Baylor	87*
15	UTSA	82

Second round 23–24 March 2009
1	Maryland	71
9	Utah	56
5	Kansas St.	61
4	Vanderbilt	74
6	LSU	52
3	Louisville	62
7	South Dakota St.	58
2	Baylor	60

Regional semifinals 28 March 2009
1	Maryland	78
4	Vanderbilt	74
3	Louisville	56
2	Baylor	39

Regional finals 30 March 2009
1	Maryland	60
3	Louisville	77

=== Oklahoma City Regional – Oklahoma City ===
First round 21–22 March 2009
1	Oklahoma	76
16	Prairie View A&M	47
Iowa City, Iowa
8	Iowa	62
9	Georgia Tech	76
5	Xavier	59
12	Gonzaga	74
Seattle, WA
4	Pittsburgh	64
13	Montana	35
6	Purdue	65
11	Charlotte	52
Chattanooga, Tennessee
3	North Carolina	85
14	UCF	80
7	Rutgers	57
10	VCU	51
Piscataway, New Jersey
2	Auburn	85
15	Lehigh	49

Second round 23–24 March 2009
1	Oklahoma	69
9	Georgia Tech	50
12	Gonzaga	60
4	Pittsburgh	65
6	Purdue	85
3	North Carolina	70
7	Rutgers	80
2	Auburn	52

Regional semifinals 29 March 2009
1	Oklahoma	70
4	Pittsburgh	59
6	Purdue	67
7	Rutgers	61

Regional finals 31 March 2009
1	Oklahoma	74
6	Purdue	68

=== Final Four – St. Louis, Missouri ===
National Semifinals; 5 April
T1	Connecticut	83
B2	Stanford	64
R3	Louisville	61
O1	Oklahoma	59

National Championship; 7 April
T1	Connecticut	76
R3	Louisville	54

== Record by conference ==
Conference	# of Bids	Record	Win %	Sweet Sixteen	Elite Eight	Final Four	Championship Game
Pac-10	3	9–3	.750	3	2	1	0
Big East	7	15–6	.714	4	2	2	2
Big 12	6	12–6	.667	4	2	1	0
Big Ten	5	8–5	.615	3	1	0	0
ACC	6	8–6	.571	1	1	0	0
MAC	1	1–1	.500	0	0	0	0
Summit League	1	1–1	.500	0	0	0	0
West Coast	1	1–1	.500	0	0	0	0
SEC	7	6–7	.462	1	0	0	0
Mountain West	3	2–3	.400	0	0	0	0
Atlantic 10	3	0–3	.000	0	0	0	0
Colonial	2	0–2	.000	0	0	0	0

Nineteen conferences went 0-1: America East, Atlantic Sun Conference, Big Sky Conference, Big South Conference, Big West Conference, Conference USA, Horizon League, Ivy League, MAAC, MEAC, Missouri Valley Conference, Northeast Conference, Ohio Valley Conference, Patriot League, Southern Conference, Southland, Sun Belt Conference, SWAC, and WAC

== All-Tournament Team ==
- Tina Charles, Connecticut
- Maya Moore, Connecticut
- Renee Montgomery, Connecticut
- Angel McCoughtry, Louisville
- Jayne Appel, Stanford

== Game officials ==
- Tina Napier(semifinal)
- Cameron Inouye (semifinal)
- Lisa Jones (semifinal)
- Eric Brewton (semifinal)
- Melissa Barlows (semifinal)
- Felicia Grinter (semifinal)
- Dee Kantner (final)
- Lisa Mattingly (final)
- Clarke Stevens (final)

== See also ==
- 2009 NCAA Division II women's basketball tournament
- 2009 NCAA Division III women's basketball tournament
- 2009 NAIA Division I women's basketball tournament
- 2009 NAIA Division II women's basketball tournament
- 2009 NCAA Division I men's basketball tournament
