= Basketball winning streaks =

This is a list of notable winning streaks in basketball. Oklahoma City University Men’s Basketball (NAIA) has the longest win streak in men’s college basketball in the past 50 years. The 1990-91 and 1991-92 OCU Chiefs won 56 straight games en route to consecutive NAIA National Championships. The 1991 Championship team had a record of 35-3 while the 1992 team had a perfect 38-0 record winning back to back national titles.

The NBA record is listed below, and for further information see List of NBA longest winning streaks.

== Early competitions ==
=== Edmonton Grads ===
The Grads were a semi-professional women's basketball team from Canada from 1915 to 1940. They had a lifetime winning percentage of 95% and had several winning streaks of dozens of games each including every game they played at the 1924 Paris Olympics (where basketball was a demonstration sport).

== FIBA ==
The United States men's national basketball team had a 58-game winning streak from the 1992 Olympic Games to the 2002 FIBA World Championship.

== NCAA streaks ==
On January 19, 1974, the UCLA Bruins lost a basketball game to the Notre Dame Fighting Irish, 71–70. It ended a streak of 88 consecutive victories, which coincidentally began after losing to Notre Dame exactly three years earlier on January 19, 1971. The streak encompassed 88 games, an NCAA division I basketball record eclipsing the 60 game streak of San Francisco in 1956. The streak is still an active Division I men's basketball streak, but the Division I basketball streak was matched when the University of Connecticut women's basketball team won a game against Ohio State on December 19, 2010, and the old record was eclipsed when the team won their 89th consecutive victory against Florida State on December 21, 2010. UConn's streak ended at 90 games, after losing to Stanford, who was the last team to beat UConn before the start of the streak. That was the longest winning streak in Division I College Basketball history for seven years, until UConn surpassed it after they won their 91st straight game. UConn's 2nd winning streak ended at 111 straight after losing to Mississippi State on March 31, 2017, in the semi-finals of the NCAA tournament 66–64 in overtime.

=== San Francisco – men's basketball – 60 games ===
In 1950, Phil Woolpert, a high school coach at the time, took over as head basketball coach of the San Francisco Dons when Pete Newell left to coach Michigan State University. The school had no gym, and arranged for practices at a nearby high school. The team went 44–48 in its first four seasons, and was not expected to be very good in the 1954–1955 season.

The team started off the season with three wins, then lost to UCLA 47–40. They would go on to win 60 consecutive games, including two national championships, and the first undefeated seasons in NCAA basketball history. Two of the players on the squad for the first 55 games of the streak, Bill Russell and K.C. Jones, became stars for the Boston Celtics.

After winning their second national championship in 1956, Russell and Jones graduated. The team then won five more games. Before the streak officially ended, they lost a game, when they took on the US Olympic team. Both Russell and Jones were on the Olympic team. The streak ended officially on December 17, 1956, when Illinois beat San Francisco 62–33.

=== UCLA streak – men's basketball – 88 games ===
When the 1970–71 basketball season started, the reigning national champion was UCLA, having won its sixth championship in the spring. They started the season with a five-game winning streak from the previous season, and would win their next thirteen games, reaching a winning streak of 18 games. In addition to the consecutive wins streak, the UCLA team had won 49 consecutive games against non-conference opponents.

However, on January 23, 1971, UCLA played Notre Dame at Notre Dame. Austin Carr scored 46 points, leading the Irish to an 89–82 victory. Six days later, UCLA would win their next game against Santa Barbara, the start of the new win streak. The following game was against their local rival USC, who was undefeated at the time, and ranked number two in polls, one position ahead of UCLA at number three. UCLA won the contest 64–60, and would go on to win the rest of the games that season, winning their fifth consecutive National Championship (seventh overall) and pushing their winning streak to 15 games. There was little attention to the streak at the time. The existing NCAA Division I basketball record was 60 games, and UCLA itself had had longer streaks in its history, winning 47 consecutive games during Lew Alcindor's time. In addition, the media attention was more focused on the NBA-ABA bidding wars, as the professional leagues were attempting to entice college players to join the professional ranks.

Interest in the streak grew late in the 1971–72 season, when it reached 40 games. The media reports of the games began including the streak count in the headline about this time. By the end of the season, the UCLA team had won another national championship and stretched the streak to 45 games. In the following season, Coach John Wooden acknowledged the streak, but tried to downplay it. According to Bruins guard Greg Lee, "Tonight, Coach Wooden did mention our long win streak, but told us not to think about it. Speaking for the team, I know I'm not thinking about it. I don't worry about losing when I go to bed."

San Francisco, the holders of the record at the time, had chances to end the streak, but they lost twice, accounting for wins 58 and 73. After UCLA tied the 60-game NCAA Division I record, the following game was against Notre Dame. The Irish lost by 19. Win number 75 was the National Championship of the 1972–73 season. Immediately after the game, rather than staying to celebrate, junior Bill Walton headed to a meeting with Sam Gilbert to discuss a possible offer from the Philadelphia 76ers for a reported $2 million. However, Walton returned for his senior year.

In the 1973–74 season, UCLA had a close call against Maryland, but ended up winning by a single point for win number 77. They won number 79 against North Carolina State by 18 points, although they would later lose to the eventual national champions in the NCAA semifinals, the first team other than UCLA to win the national title since 1966.

On January 19, 1974, UCLA played Notre Dame after beating Iowa 66–44 for its 88th consecutive victory. UCLA had beaten Notre Dame during the streak, although the streak started after a Notre Dame win in 1971. Digger Phelps, the 32-year-old coach of Notre Dame, decided to change his game plan from his previous strategy. The strategy largely worked. Although Walton hit 12 of 14 shots, the UCLA team was not often able to lob the ball into Walton. Even during the game, the eventual outcome was far from obvious. The Bruins outplayed the Irish in the opening minutes, building a 17-point lead. The Bruins held a 70–59 lead with under four minutes to go in the game, but the Irish ended the game on a 12–0 run, winning 71–70, and ending the longest NCAA Division I men's basketball streak at 88 games.

=== UConn streak – women's basketball – 70 games ===
In March 2001, UConn had won their second national championship a year earlier, and was headed to the NCAA tournament as a number 1 seed. They had only lost two games during the regular season, once to Tennessee, and once to Notre Dame, each of whom were number one seeds in the tournament. However, the UConn squad had lost Svetlana Abrosimova, an All-American who would be drafted seventh in the WNBA draft, to a season-ending foot injury. They also lost the 2000 Sports Illustrated Player of the Year, Shea Ralph, to a season-ending knee injury during the Big East tournament final. The depleted UConn squad won their first four games to advance to the Final Four in St. Louis. Their opening game was against Notre Dame, a team they had lost to in the regular season, but had beaten to win the Big East Championship game. The UConn team had a twelve-point lead going into halftime of the semi-final game, but fell behind in the second half, and lost to the eventual National Champion. That would be the last game they would lose until 2003.

UConn started the 2001–02 season with two relatively easy wins, beating Fairfield on November 9, 2001, 93–50, and two days, later, beating FIU 91–47. Next up was perennial power North Carolina, but the Huskies prevailed 94–74. In December, they beat Oklahoma 86–72, the closest game of the season to that point. The next challenge was Tennessee in January 2002, but UConn won 86–72. UConn continued to win throughout the season, ending the regular season with a record of 30–0.

They won the rest of the Big East Conference matches easily, and entered the NCAA tournament as a number 1 seed. The semi-final game was against a two seed, Tennessee, but the game was not close, with UConn winning 79–56. The national championship game was against Oklahoma. The game was close until the final seconds, with UConn winning its third national championship, completing its second undefeated season, and finishing the year with a 39–0 record.

The 2002–03 season opened with a win over Wright State 85–39. After beating North Carolina State, UConn traveled to Hawai'i, where they would meet their prior year National Championship opponent in the final of the Rainbow Wahine Classic. UConn would again prevail, winning 73–60 for their 44th consecutive win. The biggest challenge to the streak would come in the 51st game, a home game against Tennessee. The game would go into overtime, with UConn prevailing by a single point 63–62. The following game against Rutgers would also be close, but UConn won 67–62.

UConn played a strong Duke squad at Cameron Indoor Stadium on February 1, 2003, but managed to win 77–65. They finished up the regular season without a loss, and reached the Big East Tournament with a 68-game winning streak. They won their first two games in the Big East Tournament easily, then faced Villanova, a team they had beaten in January by twenty points, 58–38. This game would turn out much differently, with Villanova achieving an upset, knocking the UConn team out of the Big East Tournament, and ending the NCAA women's basketball win streak at 70 games.

=== UConn streak – women's basketball – 90 games ===
==== The loss before the streak begins ====
The 2007–08 season started with a lot of promise. UConn faced fourth-ranked Stanford in the Virgin Islands, but won 66–54. The team would reach the end of the regular season with only a single loss, at Rutgers 73–71, then won the rematch at home 66–46. However, the team lost two starters to injury, Kalana Greene and Mel Thomas. UConn won the first four games of the NCAA tournament, but then faced a rematch with Stanford, who won the semifinal game 82–73. That would prove to be the last loss for some time.

==== 2008–09 season (wins 39-0) ====
UConn opened the season against Georgia Tech, a team unranked in the pre-season. The game was tied at the half; UConn went on to win by eleven. The fifth game of the season was against Oklahoma, a team ranked number 4 in the polls. Characterized as a "significant test" by ESPN's Graham Hays, Connecticut would win easily by 28 points, 106–78.

After winning their first 17 games, Connecticut faced the number two ranked team in the nation North Carolina, also 17–0 for the season. UConn was ranked number one, but had just lost starter Caroline Doty to a season-ending knee injury in the prior game. Despite the loss of Doty, the game did not turn out to be the close game anticipated. UConn reached a double-digit lead early in the game, extended to a 46-30 halftime lead, and finished with a 30-point victory, 88–58. All five starters, including Lorin Dixon in her first start of the season, would each score in double digits, led by Renee Montgomery with 21.

During the rest of the regular season, only Notre Dame and Rutgers played UConn to within ten points, with each team losing by exactly 10. The team entered the Big East tournament with a 30–0 record.

Neither of the first two rounds of the Big East tournament were close, with UConn defeating South Florida by 37 points, and Villanova by 30 points. The final was expected to be a contest, because Louisville had a record of 29–4 and was ranked seventh in the nation. However, with eight minutes to go in the game, UConn's Maya Moore had scored 28 points, while the Cardinals had only 27. UConn went on to win 75–36.

Connecticut won the first four games of the NCAA tournament easily. That set up a rematch with Stanford, the last team to beat UConn. This time the UConn team prevailed, winning with a score of 83–64. The national championship game was between UConn and Louisville, a team UConn had beaten in both the regular season and the Big East Championship game. Connecticut won the third meeting as well, 76–54, winning their sixth national championship and completing their third undefeated season.

==== 2009–10 season (wins 39-0) ====
The Connecticut team opened the year ranked No. 1 in both the ESPN Coaches poll and the AP Top 25 Poll, following a 39–0 record leading to a national championship in the prior season. In both cases, the polling results were unanimous. UConn graduated three seniors, Renee Montgomery, Tahirah Williams and Cassie Kerns, but only Montgomery was a regular starter. The team added one freshman, Kelly Faris, and Caroline Doty returned to the line-up after missing most of the prior season due to injury.

Despite working toward their 40th consecutive win, the focus in the early part of the season was not on the streak, but on other accomplishments. In the opening game against Northeastern, Tina Charles scored her 1000th career rebound. In the same game, Kalana Greene scored her 1000th career point. After winning their ninth game of the season, and extending their streak to 48 games, UConn faced Stanford at home. Both teams were undefeated, and were ranked first and second in the polls. Stanford's last loss was to UConn in 2009, and UConn's last loss was to Stanford in 2008. For the first time this season, UConn trailed at halftime. However, in the second half, the Huskies moved out to a large lead and ended up winning by 12 points.

After winning its next six games, UConn faced Notre Dame on January 16. The game was notable because it was the first ever ESPN College GameDay held before a women's basketball game. Both teams were undefeated; UConn at 16–0, ranked number one in the country and Notre Dame had a record of 15–0, with a number three ranking. However, the game would not be close. UConn led at halftime 42–19, and won 70–46.

UConn went on to win the rest of their regular season games, ending the regular season with a record of 30–0, and extending their overall streak to 69, just one game shy of the NCAA Division I women's basketball record of 70, established by UConn in 2003. UConn won the regular season Big East title, so they had a double bye into the quarterfinals of the Big East tournament. Their first game would never be close, with UConn leading at the half 44–17, and ended with a 77–41 victory. UConn's Tina Charles would tie her career high with 34 points, while Maya Moore would score the 2000th point of her career, ending the game with 16 points, 14 rebounds and 7 assists. The win would be UConn's 70th consecutive win, tying the record for the longest winning streak in the history of NCAA Division I women's college basketball, set by the Huskies in 2003.

The Big East Tournament semi-final game was against Notre Dame, the third match up between the two teams this season. UConn won 59–44, to set a new NCAA women's basketball winning streak record at 71 games. However, the team was focused on upcoming games and "didn't even celebrate". UConn would go on to win the Big East title match against West Virginia 60–32.

UConn entered the NCAA tournament as a number one seed. Their first-round game was against Southern—UConn won 95–39. The second-round game was against Temple, coached by Tonya Cardoza, who had been an assistant at UConn for 14 years. This was the first meeting of the two teams since Cardoza took over the position. UConn limited the use of the starting team, but still won 90–36. UConn then beat Iowa State 74–36 and Florida State 90–50 to advance to the Final Four.

The national championship game was between Stanford and UConn. Stanford would go to halftime with a 20–12 lead. The 12 points scored by UConn was the lowest first-half total in the history of Connecticut basketball.

Maya Moore led the team after the half, scoring 11 of the team's first 17 points, including the basket that put Connecticut back into the lead, this time for good. Moore would end up with 23 points and 11 rebounds, and earned Most Outstanding Player honors for the Final Four. Connecticut would go on to win 53–47, ending their streak of double-digit victories, but winning their 78th consecutive game, resulting in their seventh National Championship, their second consecutive undefeated season and their fourth overall undefeated season.

==== 2010–11 season (wins 36-2) ====
UConn opened the 2010–11 season with a win over Holy Cross, 117–37. The next game was against Baylor, the number 2 ranked team in the country. Baylor jumped to an early lead 8–3, but UConn came back, and held an eight-point lead at the half 35–27. Although UConn hit a three pointer in the opening seconds of the second half to extend the lead to double digits, Baylor responded with a 29–10 run to take an eight-point lead 56–48 with about seven minutes to go. Bria Hartley scored eight of her nine points in the last four minutes of the game to help UConn hold on for a 65–64 victory.

UConn's next opponent was Georgia Tech, the team involved in the first game of the streak. The win by UConn was the 81st consecutive, tying Washington University, a Division III team, for the longest streak in NCAA women's basketball. UConn hosted the World Vision Classic over Thanksgiving. In the first of the three games, UConn easily beat Howard 86–25, to set the new record consecutive win streak for NCAA women's basketball at 82 games. UConn then went on to beat the other two opponents in the Classic, Lehigh and LSU and then extended the streak to 87 games with wins over South Florida, Sacred Heart and Marquette.

The following game was the Maggie Dixon Classic, held at Madison Square Garden. Two of the four teams playing in the double-header were top-ranked UConn and 10th-ranked Ohio State. UConn won the game 81–50 to tie the NCAA basketball consecutive wins streak held by UCLA.

On Tuesday, December 21, 2010, UConn hosted Florida State in Veterans Memorial Coliseum at the XL Center in Hartford, Connecticut. Maya Moore scored a career-high 41 points, but the emphasis was not on individual stats. The game represented the 89th consecutive victory, the longest winning streak in NCAA basketball history.

The streak reached 90 games with a win over Pacific, but ended in with a 71–59 loss to Stanford at Maples Pavilion on December 30, 2010.

==== UCLA and Notre Dame player reactions ====
Bill Walton – "They play with great sense of team, great purpose, phenomenal execution of fundamentals, relentless attack", he said. "It is what every team should aspire to, regardless of the sport."

Dwight Clay, the Notre Dame player who hit the winning shot to end the UCLA streak: "Well, I think it's great. It's great for women's basketball and it's great for sports in general ... But, you know, what Connecticut has done, you know, I don't believe you can separate that. Eight-eight games is 88 games. That's a hell of a treat."

=== UConn streak – women's basketball – 111 games (all games), 126 games (regular season) ===
Beginning after their loss to Stanford in the fall of 2014, the Huskies went on two winning streaks of over 100 games—one of 111 in all games, and the other of 126 in regular-season games only. The 111-game streak included two national championships. During this streak, UConn made history by being the first team in NCAA Division I women's basketball to win four consecutive championships.

Over the course of the 111-game streak, only three games were won by fewer than 10 points. The first was at No. 12 Florida State on November 14, 2016, where UConn won 78–76. The second game was at No. 4 Maryland in front of a sold-out crowd on December 29, 2016, where UConn won 87–81. The third was at conference foe Tulane on February 18, 2017, with UConn winning 63–60. Of their wins, 31 were against ranked teams. UConn defeated South Carolina 66–55 on February 13, 2017, at home, to record their 100th straight win.

The all-games streak ended at 111 wins on March 31, 2017, following a last-second 66–64 OT loss to Mississippi State in the semifinals of the 2017 NCAA women's tournament. The regular-season winning streak, however, was not affected, reaching 100 games on January 9, 2018, in an 80–44 Huskies blowout of UCF. That streak would not end until January 3, 2019, when UConn lost 68–57 at Baylor. This game not only ended UConn's 126-game regular-season winning streak, but was also the Huskies' first double-digit loss since a 13-point loss to Notre Dame in 2012.

=== Men's D-I conference champion streaks ===
Streak	Regular season champion	Years	Conference	Coach(es)
14**	Kansas	2005–2018	Big 12	Bill Self
13	UCLA	1967–1979	AAWU, Pacific-8, Pacific-10	John Wooden, Gene Bartow, Gary Cunningham
11	Gonzaga	2001–2011	West Coast Conference	Mark Few
11**	Gonzaga	2013–2023	West Coast Conference	Mark Few
10	Connecticut	1951–1960	Yankee	Hugh Greer
10	UNLV	1983–1992	PCAA, Big West	Jerry Tarkanian

* Active streak

If not for a 1-point loss to San Francisco in 2012, Gonzaga would have a streak of 23 consecutive WCC regular-season titles (including ties).

** Includes ties

Kansas' streak and one of Gonzaga's streaks include ties for first place. The Big 12 and West Coast Conference do not use tiebreakers to determine regular-season conference champions, only using them to determine the top seed in their conference tournaments.

=== Men's D-I home court streaks ===
The eight longest home court winning streaks in D-I men's basketball:

Streak	Team	Years	Ended by
129	Kentucky	1943–1955	Georgia Tech
99	St. Bonaventure	1948–1961	Niagara
98	UCLA	1970–1976	Oregon
84	Cincinnati	1957–1964	Kansas
81	Arizona	1945–1951	Kansas State
81	Marquette	1967–1973	Notre Dame
80	Lamar	1978–1984	Louisiana Tech
76	Gonzaga	2018–2023	Loyola Marymount

*Active streak

=== Women's D-I home court streaks ===
The seven longest home court winning streaks in D-I women's basketball have all involved the University of Connecticut (UConn), with three achieved by UConn and four others ended by a Huskies' win.

1. 99 games — Held by UConn, ended by St. John's
2. 98 games — Held by UConn, ended by Baylor.
3. 82 games — Held by Stanford, ended by UConn
4. 71 games — Held by South Carolina, ended by UConn
5. 69 games — Held by Baylor, ended by UConn
6. 69 games — Held by UConn, ended by Duke
7. 69 games — Held by Tennessee, ended by UConn

On December 29, 2003, UConn faced NC State with a chance to step into the history books. The Huskies had won 68 consecutive home games. The NCAA record for consecutive home victories was held by the Tennessee Lady Vols, set in 1996, and ended by the UConn Huskies. UConn beat the Wolfpack easily, 87–53, to tie the record at 69 games.

Five days later, UConn faced Duke, with a chance to take over sole possession of the home court win streak. However, Duke was ranked fourth in the nation, so the outcome was far from certain. UConn unveiled new silver uniforms for the game, and at the end of the first half, the record seemed in sight. UConn led the game 35–18, almost doubling the score of the Blue Devils. However, the Huskies hit on 56% of their free throws, and Alana Beard scored 21 to get Duke back into the game. Jessica Foley hit a three-pointer at the buzzer to win the game for Duke, 68–67, and end the quest to extend the longest homecourt winning streak.

In 2012, UConn had a home winning streak of its own. After eclipsing the prior records of 69 games, the Huskies had gone on to win 99 in a row. They attempted to extend the record to 100 consecutive games against unranked conference foe St. John's. UConn had not lost a game to an unranked team at home, a stretch covering 19 years and 261 games. However, the Red Storm won 57–56 to end the home court winning streak at 99. With that streak ended, the nation's longest active home court winning streak was held by Stanford, at 76 games.

On December 29, 2012, UConn defeated Stanford at the Cardinal's home court to end Stanford's 82-game winning streak at home.

In 2014, Baylor tied Tennessee and UConn for the third place for home consecutive victories with their 69th win. In the bid to win their 70th game, they faced UConn. The two senior starters on the Baylor team, Odyssey Sims, the nation's scoring leader, and Makenzie Robertson, daughter of head coach Kim Mulkey, had never lost a game at the Ferrell Center. The game was reasonably close late in the second half, but UConn went on to win by eleven points, 66–55 to end Baylor's home court win streak.

On February 16, 2025, UConn defeated South Carolina in Columbia to end the Gamecocks' 71 game home win streak, by a score of 87-58.

=== Men's D-I road game streaks ===
1. 35 Kansas (1924–28), ended by Oklahoma

=== Women's D-I road game streaks ===
1. 55 UConn (2014–19), ended by Baylor.
2. 34 UConn (2000–04), ended by Notre Dame
3. 30 UConn (2008–11), ended by Stanford

=== Men's D-II overall streak ===
1. 57 – Winona State, 2006–2007.

=== Men's D-II home court streak ===
1. 106 - Nova Southeastern (2020-).
2. 80 – Philadelphia (1991–1995). School now known as Jefferson.
3. 42 - West Texas A&M University Buffaloes (2022-2025)
4. 35 – Northwest Missouri State (2018–2020)

=== Men's D-II road game streak ===
The NCAA does not list a record for consecutive road wins in its Division II men's record book.

=== Women's D-II overall streak ===
1. 73 – Ashland, 2016–2018

=== Women's D-II home court streak ===
1. 113 - Lubbock Christian 2015-2023
2. 87 – Nebraska–Kearney (1995–2001), ended by Washburn.

=== Women's D-II road game streak ===
1. 32 – Saint Rose (1996–1999)

=== Men's D-III overall streak ===
1. 60 – SUNY Potsdam, 1985–1987
2. 50 – Yeshiva University, 2019–2021
3. 36 - UW-Platteville, 1997-1998
4. 32 - Hamilton, 1990-1991
5. 32 - Nebraska Wesleyan, 2018-2019
6. 32 - UW-Platteville, 1994-1995

=== Men's D-III home court streak ===
1. 81 - SUNY Potsdam (1982-88)
2. 64 - Randolph-Macon College (2018-2023)
3. 62 – North Park (1984–1988)
4. 32 – Yeshiva University (2018–2021)
5. 30 – Whitman College (2016–2018)

=== Men's D-III road game streak ===
The NCAA does not list a record for consecutive road wins in its Division III men's record book.

=== Women's D-III overall streak ===
1. 91 – NYU, 2023–2026
2. 81 – Washington (MO), 1998–2001

=== Women's D-III home court streaks ===
1. 121 Amherst (2009–2016), ended by Tufts

=== Women's D-III road game streaks ===
1. 41 Amherst (2016–19), ended by Bowdoin.

== U Sports ==
=== University of Winnipeg Wesmen streak – women's basketball – 88 games ===
- Streak started October 24, 1992 (University of Winnipeg Wesmen 75 – University of Alberta Golden Bears 53).
- Streak ended December 2, 1994 (University of Winnipeg Wesmen 62 – University of Manitoba Bisons 64).

The Lady Wesmen would go on to a record 118–1 in the span from 1992 to 1995, including 3 CIS (now U Sports) national basketball championships and beating several NCAA Women's Division I programs in North American tournaments.

== AAU basketball ==
=== Wayland Baptist – women's basketball – 131 games ===
The Wayland Baptist University Flying Queens women's basketball team was one of the predominant women's basketball team in the 1950s. In 1954, they began a winning streak that would reach 131 games, and included four consecutive AAU National Championships.

== High school basketball ==
=== Boys' basketball ===
The Fredericton High School (Fredericton, New Brunswick) junior boys' basketball team won 207 consecutive games between 2006 and 2012, including five Provincial championships. The team was coached by Gary Young.

Palmer High School, located in Palmer, a town of 270 in northwest Iowa, has the 5th longest winning streak in the country. Palmer's 103-game win streak from 1986 to 1989, is still the Iowa high school record, and ranks as the fifth-longest in the United States. All of the games were coached by Hall of Fame Coach Alden Skinner, who had a career record of 380 wins against 108 losses for a winning percentage of 77.9%. The streak included State Championships in 1986 (26–0), 1987 (26–0), and 1988 (27–0). It started with the beginning of 1985–86 season and ended in the State semifinals in 1989 with a 60–56 loss to eventual State Champion Keota. Palmer came back to win the consolation game. In those years, Palmer was one of the smallest high schools in the state of Iowa, with just 17 boys in the four grades of high school in 1988. Two members of that team, Troy Skinner and Brian Pearson, both 1988 graduates, are members of the IHSAA Basketball Players Hall of Fame, and played at the University of Iowa, and Iowa State University respectively. The North Central High School Jets, coached by Adam Mercer, in the small town of Powers in Michigan's Upper Peninsula, also had a long winning streak.

=== Girls' basketball ===
- The girls' basketball team from Strafford, Missouri had a 123-game winning streak from January 21, 2016, to December 27, 2019, which was broken by Republic High School. The streak included three straight MSHSAA Class 4 State Championships.
- The girls' basketball team from Pillow Academy (1972–1975) won exactly 100 straight games, and won 4 straight MPSA Overall State Championships, after the win streak was broken by a Memphis school, the Lady Mustangs went on to win 28 straight more games and had a record from 1972 to 1975 of 128–1.
- The Taylor County Vikings girls' basketball team from Butler, Georgia (1967–1972) won 132 consecutive games going undefeated for five years and winning five back-to-back state championships. The Vikings were coached by Norman Carter.
- The Roosevelt High School Rough Riders girls' basketball team from Sioux Falls, South Dakota won 111 consecutive games and six Class AA titles, including five in a row (1997–01).
- The Fairfield (Montana) Eagle girls, coached by Dustin Gordon, collected 120 consecutive wins. They had four straight Montana High School Association Class B titles and four straight undefeated seasons (2010–2015).
- The West Holmes High School girls' basketball team won 108 consecutive games between 1984 and 1987, including three consecutive state championships. The high school is located in Millersburg, Ohio, and was coached by Jack VanReeth, inducted into the Ohio Basketball Hall of Fame.
- Hanover High School in Hanover, Massachusetts won 154 consecutive games between 1965 and 1975 coached by Judy Schneider.
- Central Plains High School in Claflin, Kansas won 138 straight games from February 24, 2015, to December 11, 2020. The Oilers also won five of their six-straight state championships (five in 2A, one in 1A) during the streak. The streak was snapped with a 49–44 loss to Phillipsburg High School.

The Baskin High School women's basketball team holds the record for longest winning streak in organized sports. The Lady Rams won 218 consecutive games from 1948 to 1953—a span of six years. Once the streak was broken, another 71 game streak continued. In the span of ten years, the Lady Rams led by Hall of Fame coach, Edna "Tiny" Tarbutton, would go 315 and 2 with 9 state titles and an average winning margin of more than 30 points. In 1993, Tarbutton was inducted into the Louisiana Sports Hall of Fame located in Natchitoches.

== NBA streaks ==
=== Los Angeles Lakers – 33 games ===
The 1971–72 Los Angeles Lakers won 33 consecutive games without a loss, the longest undefeated streak in NBA history.

This streak was challenged by the 2012–2013 Miami Heat, who won 27 games in a row before losing to the Chicago Bulls, and by the 2015–2016 Golden State Warriors' 28-game win streak (including 4 from the previous season), which ended with a loss to the Milwaukee Bucks.

=== NBA G League – 18 games ===
During the 2007–08 season, the Idaho Stampede set an NBA G League record (then branded as the NBA D-League) with 18 consecutive wins between December 18, 2007 & February 7, 2008.

== European Competitions ==
=== EuroLeague (2001–Present) ===
- 18 games: CSKA Moscow (2006–07 season)
- 17 games: CSKA Moscow (2004–05 season)
- 16 games: Virtus Bologna (2000–01 season)
- 15 games: CSKA Moscow (2014–15 season)
- 13 games: CSKA Moscow (2011–12 season)
- 13 games: FC Barcelona (2012–13 season)
- 13 games: FC Barcelona (2013–14 season)
- 13 games: Real Madrid (2013–14 season)
- 13 games: Real Madrid (2019–20 season)
- 12 games: Fenerbahçe (2018-19 season)
- 12 games: CSKA Moscow (2020–21 season)
- 12 games: Paris Basketball (2024-25 season)
- 11 games: Baloncesto Málaga (2005–06 season)
- 11 games: Panathinaikos (2006–07 season)
- 11 games: FC Barcelona (2009–10 season)
- 11 games: Olympiacos (2013–14 season)
- 11 games: Anadolu Efes (2019–20 season)
