= Jefferson County Airport =

Jefferson County Airport may refer to:

- Jefferson County International Airport in Jefferson County, Washington, United States (FAA: 0S9)
- Jefferson County Airpark in Jefferson County, Ohio, United States (FAA: 2G2)
- Jefferson County Airport in Jefferson County, Ohio, United States (FAA: ~~44D~~)
- DuBois Regional Airport, formerly DuBois-Jefferson County Airport, in Pennsylvania, United States (FAA: DUJ)
- Rocky Mountain Metropolitan Airport, formerly Jefferson County Airport, in Colorado, United States (FAA: BJC)
- Southeast Texas Regional Airport, formerly Jefferson County Airport, in Texas, United States (FAA: BPT)
