= Holmes County Airport =

Public use airport in Millersburg, Holmes County, Ohio

- IATA: none; ICAO: none; FAA LID: 10G

Summary
- Airport type: Public
- Owner: Holmes County Airport Authority
- Location: Millersburg, Ohio
- Time zone: UTC−05:00 (-5)
  - Summer (DST): UTC−04:00 (-4)
- Elevation AMSL: 1,226.5 ft (373.8 m)
- Coordinates: 40°32′14″N 081°57′16″W

Map
- Location of airport in Ohio 10G (the United States)

Runways
Direction	Length		Surface
Direction	ft	m	Surface
09/27	4,400	1,341	Asphalt

Statistics (2022)
- Aircraft operations: 21,535
- Based aircraft: 18
- Source: Federal Aviation Administration

Holmes County Airport (FAA LID: 10G) is a public airport located two miles southwest of Millersburg, Ohio, United States. It is owned and operated by the Holmes County Airport Authority.

The airport is home to Airport Ridge Sporting Clays, a shooting range and banquet gallery.

== History ==
Land for the airport came from the previous Crown Hill Airport, which was owned by the Domestic Film Corporation, as well as from at least one local farm. (Note: The land was donated in exchange for a license for the corporation to run a fixed-base operator on the airport and construction of a gravel access road.) An engineering company was hired to design the airport in January 1967, land from the corporation was donated in February, and a $100,000 state grant was received in early March. The airport authority filed to condemn 4 acres (1.6 ha) of land necessary to build the runway in early April, a similar case for approximately 76 acres (31 ha) was settled in late May and the about 23 acres (9.3 ha) of land was transferred by the Domestic Film Corporation in July. The airport and its 4,000-foot (1,200 m) runway were dedicated on 8 October 1967. However, less than a year later it was suffering financial difficulties due to legal technicalities that would not allow the county to provide funding. The issue was resolved with an amendment to the airport authority charter in December.

The runway was moved 140 feet (43 m) south and extended to 4,400 feet (1,300 m) in 2014. By 2025, planning was underway to build a new hangar and terminal.

== Facilities and aircraft ==
Holmes County Airport covers an area of 200 acres (81 ha) which contains one runway designated 09/27 with a 4,400 ft × 65 ft (1,341 m × 20 m) asphalt pavement.

The airport has a fixed-base operator that sells fuel.

For the 12-month period ending September 7, 2022, the airport had 21,535 aircraft operations, an average of 59 per day: 93% general aviation, 5% military, and 2% air taxi. For the same time period, 18 aircraft were based at the airport: 16 single-engine airplanes, 1 multi-engine airplane, and 1 jet airplane.

== Accidents and incidents ==
- On March 14, 2005, a Piper PA-32 was substantially damaged while executing a forced landing to runway 27 at the Holmes County Airport. The aircraft was en route from the Port Columbus International Airport to the Gatineau Airport in Ottawa, Canada. The pilot had flown to Columbus 10 days prior but drove back to Ottawa because of weather. The airplane was parked outside until the pilot returned on the 14th to return it to Ottawa. No anomalies were found in the fuel system during the preflight inspection, and the pilot departed normally. The engine lost all power approximately 20 to 25 minutes into the flight. The pilot changed tanks and selected each magneto independently but was unsuccessful at restarting the engine. The pilot then observed Holmes County Airport, and attempted a forced landing to runway 27. However, the airplane impacted trees short of the runway approximately 100 feet short of the runway, and then impacted the ground. The probable cause of the accident was found to be the pilot's inadequate preflight which resulted in a loss of engine power due to fuel contamination.
- On August 9, 2011, a Piper PA-23 Apache airplane crashed short of the runway at Holmes County Airport while en route from Terre Haute, Indiana to Steubenville. The aircraft was reported to be diverted to Holmes due to poor weather.
- On August 8, 2011, a Piper PA-23 Apache collided with trees and terrain while maneuvering to land at the Holmes County Airport. The airport was en route from the Sullivan County Airport to the Jefferson County Airpark in Steubenville. The aircraft entered instrument meteorological conditions en route and performed multiple climbs and descents. Though the pilot attempted to land at Steubenville, he never got it in sight, so he planned to return to the departure airport. The pilot initially proceeded to the Carrollton County Airport but changed his destination to Holmes after learning the airport lighting was inoperative at Carrollton. The pilot could equally not see Holms but began an approach to the airport anyways, eventually crashing. The probable cause of the accident was found to be the pilot’s failure to maintain clearance with terrain during the landing approach in night conditions and fog. Contributing to the accident was the pilot’s inadequate preflight planning.
- On May 13, 2016, a Waco YKS-7 was damaged while landing at the Holmes County Airport. The pilot attempted a wheel landing in gusting crosswind conditions. The pilot reported that the airplane swerved left, he applied right rudder and right brake to no avail, and then he applied both brakes to prevent a runway excursion. The airplane nosed over and exited the runway. The probable cause of the accident was found to be the pilot's loss of directional control during landing in gusting wind conditions resulting in excessive brake application, and airplane nose over.
- On December 21, 2016, a Cessna 175C impacted a fence post and terrain during a forced landing following a loss of engine power on approach to the Holmes County Airport. The pilot reported he had taken fuel samples from the aircraft's fuel system and concluded there was no contamination. After takeoff, the pilot switched to the left fuel tank for the cruise portion of the flight. About 5 miles from 10G, he completed the before landing checklist, but he failed to switch the fuel selector back to the "Both" setting. After the engine lost power while on short final to land, the pilot changed the fuel selector to the right tank, but he still subsequently executed a forced landing to an open area at the base of a hill. The pilot stated that no mechanical malfunctions or failures preceded the accident. The probable cause of the accident was found to be the pilot's improper in-flight fuel management and his failure to switch the fuel selector to the “both” position in accordance with the Before Landing checklist, which resulted in a loss of engine power due to fuel starvation.

== See also ==
- List of airports in Ohio
