= 2009 Big East Tournament =

2009 Big East Tournament may refer to:

- 2009 Big East men's basketball tournament
- 2009 Big East women's basketball tournament
