= Holmes County Courthouse =

Holmes County Courthouse may refer to:

- Holmes County Courthouse (Ohio), Millersburg, Ohio
- Holmes County Courthouse (Mississippi), Lexington, Mississippi, listed on the National Register of Historic Places
