= 2008–09 Pittsburgh Panthers women's basketball team =

Intercollegiate basketball season

2008–09 Pittsburgh Panthers women's basketball

NCAA, Sweet Sixteen
- Conference: Big East Conference (1979–2013)|Big East

Ranking
- Coaches: No. 15
- AP: No. 15
- Record: 25-8 (12-4 Big East)
- Head coach: Agnus Berenato
- Assistant coaches: Jeff Williams; Caroline McCombs; Yolett McPhee-McCuin
- Home arena: Petersen Events Center

2008–09 Big East Conference women's basketball standings
| | Conf. | | | | Overall |
| Team | W | | L | PCT | W | | L | PCT |
|---|---|---|---|---|---|---|---|---|
| No. 1 Connecticut† | 16 | – | 0 | 1.000 | 39 | – | 0 | 1.000 |
| No. 7 Louisville | 14 | – | 2 | .875 | 34 | – | 5 | .872 |
| No. 15 Pittsburgh | 12 | – | 4 | .750 | 25 | – | 8 | .758 |
| No. 23 Notre Dame | 10 | – | 6 | .625 | 22 | – | 9 | .710 |
| DePaul | 10 | – | 6 | .625 | 23 | – | 10 | .697 |
| Villanova | 10 | – | 6 | .625 | 19 | – | 14 | .576 |
| Rutgers | 9 | – | 7 | .563 | 21 | – | 13 | .618 |
| South Florida | 8 | – | 8 | .500 | 27 | – | 10 | .730 |
| Georgetown | 7 | – | 9 | .438 | 20 | – | 14 | .588 |
| Marquette | 7 | – | 9 | .438 | 17 | – | 16 | .515 |
| Syracuse | 5 | – | 11 | .313 | 17 | – | 15 | .531 |
| West Virginia | 5 | – | 11 | .313 | 18 | – | 15 | .545 |
| St. John's | 4 | – | 12 | .250 | 19 | – | 15 | .559 |
| Seton Hall | 4 | – | 12 | .250 | 17 | – | 14 | .548 |
| Providence | 4 | – | 12 | .250 | 10 | – | 20 | .333 |
| Cincinnati | 3 | – | 13 | .188 | 14 | – | 17 | .452 |
† 2009 Big East tournament winner As of April 4, 2009; Rankings from AP Poll

The 2008–09 Pittsburgh Panthers women's basketball team represented the University of Pittsburgh in the 2008–09 NCAA Division I women's basketball season and advanced to the NCAA Tournament "Sweet 16". The Panthers were coached by Agnus Berenato. The Panthers were a member of the Big East Conference and played their home games at the Petersen Events Center in Pittsburgh, Pennsylvania.

== Previous season ==
The 2007-08 Pitt women's basketball team went 24-10, tying a program record number of wins set the previous season. Pitt earned their first ever bid to the NCAA women's basketball tournament, advancing to the second round, where they lost to eventual national champion Tennessee. Pitt finished the season ranked #16 in the Coaches' Poll, their highest finish in the polls for the women up until that point. Center Marcedes Walker and guards Karlyle Lim and Mallorie Winn finished up their eligibility.

== Offseason ==
- Agnus Berenato was honored as the Dapper Dan Sportswoman of the Year for 2008-09.
- Marcedes Walker earned a spot on the WNBA's Houston Comets's roster.
- Pitt hired assistant coach Yolett McPhee-McCuin from the University of Portland to replace departed assistant coach Shea Ralph, who took a position at her alma mater Connecticut.
- The Pitt women's team took a preseason trip to Europe to play three exhibition games.
- Shavonte Zellous was named to the State Farm Wade Trophy "Watch List".
- Seven of the women's team's games were picked up for television, including two appearances on ESPN2.
- Former center Marcedes Walker's jersey was selected to hang in the "Ring of Honor" at the Women's Basketball Hall of Fame.
- Shavonte Zellous was named to the preseason All-American teams of Lindy's. and the Sporting News.
- Agnus Berenato's contract was extended to coach the University of Pittsburgh through the 2015-16 season.
- Shavonte Zellous was a unanimous selection to the pre-season All-Big East team.
- Shavonte Zellous was named as one of 30 candidates for the John R. Wooden Award.
- Shavonte Zellous, alongside DeJuan Blair of the Pitt men's team, appeared on one of six covers of the Sports Illustrated College Basketball Preview Issue.

== Roster ==
| Number | Name | Height | Position | Class | Hometown |
|---|---|---|---|---|---|
| 22 | Chelsea Cole | 6-3 | Forward | Sophomore | Lumberton, NJ |
| 10 | Taneisha Harrison | 6-0 | Guard | Sophomore | Bowie, MD |
| 32 | Selena Nwude | 6-5 | Center | Sophomore (RS) | Riverdale, MD |
| 24 | Sarah Ogoke | 5-8 | Guard | Freshman | Sugar Land, TX |
| 50 | Kate Popovec | 6-3 | Center | Freshman | Canfield, OH |
| 2 | Sophronia Sallard | 5-10 | Guard/forward | Junior (RS) | Syracuse, NY |
| 25 | Shayla Scott | 6-1 | Guard | Sophomore | Monroeville, PA |
| 14 | Jania Sims* | 5-7 | Guard | Junior | Newark, NJ |
| 33 | Xenia Stewart | 6-0 | Guard | Senior | Bowie, MD |
| 12 | Brittaney Thomas | 5-8 | Guard | Junior (RS) | Montgomery, AL |
| 40 | Shawnice "Pepper" Wilson | 6-6 | Center | Freshman | Pittsburgh, PA |
| 1 | Shavonte Zellous | 5-10 | Guard | Senior (RS) | Orlando, FL |

*Injured during the first regular season game against Texas A&M and was redshirted.

== Schedule and results ==
| Date | Opponent | Location | Television | Result | Score | Record (conference) |
Exhibition
| 11/05/08 | vs. Ohio Legends | Petersen Events Center | | W | 73-58 | |
| 11/11/08 | Premier Players | Petersen Events Center | | W | 76-65 | |
Regular season
| 11/16/08 | vs. Texas A&M | Baton Rouge, La. State Farm Tipoff Classic | ESPN2 | L | 56-50 | 0-1 |
| 11/20/08 | at Western Michigan | Kalamazoo, Mich. | | W | 88-60 | 1-1 |
| 11/24/08 | vs. Penn State | Petersen Events Center; Pitt–Penn State rivalry | | W | 80-59 | 2-1 |
| 11/28/08 | vs. Elon | Petersen Events Center; Pitt Thanksgiving Tournament | | W | 84-49 | 3-1 |
| 11/29/08 | vs. Youngstown State | Petersen Events Center; Pitt Thanksgiving Tournament | | W | 99-42 | 4-1 |
| 12/03/08 | at Duquesne | Pittsburgh, Pa. City Game | | W | 66-47 | 5-1 |
| 12/07/08 | vs. Maryland | Petersen Events Center | | W | 86-57 | 6-1 |
| 12/13/08 | vs. West Virginia State | Petersen Events Center | | W | 85-37 | 7-1 |
| 12/16/08 | vs. Wagner | Petersen Events Center | | W | 98-41 | 8-1 |
| 12/19/08 | at Florida A&M | Tallahassee, Fla. | | W | 89-59 | 9-1 |
| 12/21/08 | at Florida | Gainesville, Fla. | | L | 90-83 | 9-2 |
| 12/30/08 | vs. Western Kentucky | Petersen Events Center | | W | 93-50 | 10-2 |
| 01/04/09 | vs. West Virginia | Petersen Events Center; Backyard Brawl | ESPNU | W | 72-63 | 11-2 (1-0) |
| 01/07/09 | at Providence | Providence, R.I. | | L | 77-69 | 11-3 (1-1) |
| 01/10/09 | vs. DePaul | Petersen Events Center | Big East TV | L | 69-62 | 11-4 (1-2) |
| 01/17/09 | vs. USF | Petersen Events Center | | W | 79-47 | 12-4 (2-2) |
| 01/20/09 | at Seton Hall | South Orange, N.J. | | W | 76-40 | 13-4 (3-2) |
| 01/24/09 | at Syracuse | Syracuse, N.Y. | | W | 77-75 | 14-4 (4-2) |
| 01/27/09 | at Georgetown | Washington, D.C. | | W | 50-39 | 15-4 (5-2) |
| 01/30/09 | vs. Marquette | Petersen Events Center | | W | 86-54 | 16-4 (6-2) |
| 02/03/09 | vs. Notre Dame | Petersen Events Center | | W | 82-70 | 17-4 (7-2) |
| 02/10/09 | at Rutgers | Piscataway, N.J. | CBS College Sports | W | 61-53 (OT) | 18-4 (8-2) |
| 02/15/09 | at Connecticut | Storrs, Conn. | ESPN2 | L | 95-42 | 18-5 (8-3) |
| 02/18/09 | vs. Villanova | Petersen Events Center | | W | 70-54 | 19-5 (9-3) |
| 02/21/09 | vs. Cincinnati | Petersen Events Center | | W | 68-53 | 20-5 (10-3) |
| 02/24/09 | at West Virginia | Morgantown, W.Va. Backyard Brawl | CBS College Sports | W | 72-60 | 21-5 (11-3) |
| 02/28/09 | at Louisville | Louisville, Ky. | Big East TV | L | 75-51 | 21-6 (11-4) |
| 03/02/09 | vs. St. John's | Petersen Events Center | | W | 79-60 | 22-6 (12-4) |
Big East Women's Basketball Championship
| 03/08/09 | vs. DePaul | Hartford, Conn. (Big East Quarterfinals) | ESPNU | W | 62-59 | 23-6 |
| 03/09/09 | vs. Louisville | Hartford, Conn. (Big East Semifinals) | ESPNU | L | 69-63 | 23-7 |
NCAA Division I women's basketball tournament
| 03/21/09 | vs. Montana | Seattle, Wash. (NCAA First Round) | ESPN2 | W | 64-35 | 24-7 |
| 03/23/09 | vs. Gonzaga | Seattle, Wash. (NCAA Second Round) | ESPN2 | W | 65-60 | 25-7 |
| 03/29/09 | vs. Oklahoma | Oklahoma City, Okla. (NCAA Regional Quarterfinals) | ESPN2 | L | 70-59 | 25-8 |

== Rankings ==
Ranking movement Legend: ██ Improvement in ranking. ██ Decrease in ranking. ██ Not ranked the previous week. rv=Others receiving votes.
| Poll | Pre | Wk 1 | Wk 2 | Wk 3 | Wk 4 | Wk 5 | Wk 6 | Wk 7 | Wk 8 | Wk 9 | Wk 10 | Wk 11 | Wk 12 | Wk 13 | Wk 14 | Wk 15 | Wk 16 | WK 17 | Final |
|---|---|---|---|---|---|---|---|---|---|---|---|---|---|---|---|---|---|---|---|
| AP | rv | rv | rv | 24 | 16 | 16 | 19 | 19 | 19 | rv | 25 | 21 | 22 | 19 | 19 | 15 | 14 | 15 | n/a |
| Coaches | 23 | rv | rv | rv | 20 | 19 | 23 | 22 | 20 | rv | rv | 24 | 24 | 23 | 22 | 20 | 19 | 16 | 15 |

== Team players drafted into the WNBA ==
| Round | Pick | Player | WNBA club |
|---|---|---|---|
| 1 | 11 | Shavonte Zellous | Detroit Shock |

== See also ==
- Pittsburgh Panthers women's basketball
- Pittsburgh Panthers men's basketball
- 2008–09 Pittsburgh Panthers men's basketball team
- Pittsburgh Panthers
- University of Pittsburgh
- Big East Conference
