= 2008–09 Louisville Cardinals women's basketball team =

Intercollegiate basketball season

2008–09 Louisville Cardinals women's basketball

NCAA Division I women's tournament, Runner up
- Conference: Big East Conference (1979–2013)

Ranking
- Coaches: No. 2
- Record: 34–5 (14–2 Big East)
- Head coach: Jeff Walz
- Assistant coaches: Stephanie Norman; Michelle Clark-Heard; Bethann Shapiro Ord
- Home arena: Freedom Hall (18,865)

2008–09 Big East Conference women's basketball standings
	Conf.				Overall
Team	W		L	PCT	W		L	PCT
No. 1 Connecticut†	16	–	0	1.000	39	–	0	1.000
No. 7 Louisville	14	–	2	.875	34	–	5	.872
No. 15 Pittsburgh	12	–	4	.750	25	–	8	.758
No. 23 Notre Dame	10	–	6	.625	22	–	9	.710
DePaul	10	–	6	.625	23	–	10	.697
Villanova	10	–	6	.625	19	–	14	.576
Rutgers	9	–	7	.563	21	–	13	.618
South Florida	8	–	8	.500	27	–	10	.730
Georgetown	7	–	9	.438	20	–	14	.588
Marquette	7	–	9	.438	17	–	16	.515
Syracuse	5	–	11	.313	17	–	15	.531
West Virginia	5	–	11	.313	18	–	15	.545
St. John's	4	–	12	.250	19	–	15	.559
Seton Hall	4	–	12	.250	17	–	14	.548
Providence	4	–	12	.250	10	–	20	.333
Cincinnati	3	–	13	.188	14	–	17	.452
† 2009 Big East tournament winner As of April 4, 2009; Rankings from AP Poll

The 2008–09 Louisville Cardinals women's basketball team represented the University of Louisville in the 2008–09 NCAA Division I basketball season. The Cardinals were coached by Jeff Walz, and the Cardinals played their home games at Freedom Hall in Louisville, Kentucky. The Lady Cardinals are a member of the Big East Conference and advanced to the NCAA championship match.

== Regular season ==
=== Roster ===
Number	Name	Height	Position	Class
4	Gwen Rucker	6-1	Forward	Freshman
11	Becky Burke	5-11	Guard	Freshman
13	Candyce Bingham	6-1	Forward	Senior
14	Janae Howard	6-1	Forward	Freshman
24	Laura Terry	6-1	Forward	Sophomore
33	Monique Reid	6-1	Forward	Freshman
35	Angel McCoughtry	6-1	Forward	Senior
42	Chauntise Wright	6-3	Center	Senior
45	Keshia Hines	6-2	Forward-Center	Sophomore
50	Deseree Byrd	5-9	Guard	Sophomore

=== Schedule ===
Date	Location	Opponent	Cards points	Opp. points	Record
Nov. 15/08	Cookeville, Tennessee	Tennessee Tech	82	49	1–0
Nov. 17/08	KICC	Austin Peay	72	42	2–0
Nov. 22/08	Cintas Center	Xavier	65	55	3–0
Nov. 25/08	Huntsman Center (Salt Lake City)	Utah	59	48	4–0
Nov. 28/08	Lawlor Events Ctr. (Reno)	Alabama	73	56	5–0
Nov. 29/08	Lawlor Events Ctr. (Reno)	Nevada	82	85	5–1
Dec. 4/08	Murfreesboro, Tennessee	Middle Tennessee	67	44	6–1
Dec. 7/08	Freedom Hall	Ball State	82	51	7–1
Dec. 10/08	Freedom Hall	Hartford	70	42	8–1
Dec. 14/08	Freedom Hall	Kentucky	75	59	9–1
Dec. 21/08	Freedom Hall	Vermont	67	56	10–1
Dec. 28/08	Freedom Hall	Morehead State	66	38	11–1
Dec. 29/08	Freedom Hall	Central Michigan	95	72	12–1
Dec. 30/09	Freedom Hall	New Hampshire	82	40	13–1
Jan. 3/09	Freedom Hall	DePaul	78	60	14–1
Jan. 6/09	Freedom Hall	Seton Hall	76	47	15–1
Jan. 11/09	Freedom Hall	Rutgers	64	59	16–1
Jan. 14/09	USF Sun Dome (Tampa)	South Florida	76	60	17–1
Jan. 17/09	Washington, D.C.	Georgetown	74	58	18–1
Jan. 20/09	Freedom Hall	Cincinnati	66	50	19–1
Jan. 26/09	Gempel Pavilion	Connecticut	65	93	19–2
Jan. 31/09	Alumni Hall (Providence)	Providence	81	49	19–2

== Big East tournament ==
- The Cardinals qualified for the finals of the Big East Women's Basketball Tournament. The Cardinals fell to Connecticut 75–36. The game was played at the XL Center in Hartford.

== Player stats ==
Player	Games played	Minutes	Field goals	Three pointers	Free throws	Rebounds	Assists	Blocks	Steals	Points
Angel McCoughtry	39	1252	329	43	200	362	73	42	164	901
Candyce Bingham	39	1196	170	10	138	284	66	13	63	488
Desiree Byrd	38	1221	105	21	58	105	191	2	35	289
Keshia Hines	39	820	104	0	40	188	25	25	54	248
Monique Reid	36	616	83	5	42	137	9	5	15	213
Becky Burke	38	770	58	37	38	67	30	1	24	191
Brandie Reed	21	398	29	19	2	39	18	1	7	79
Janae Howard	33	262	38	20	12	47	7	8	9	108
Gwen Rucker	32	354	23	2	32	68	4	14	10	80
Laura Terry	21	167	19	2	9	20	6	1	6	49
Mary Jackson	38	416	23	2	39	94	13	1	10	87
Tiera Stephen	37	378	9	2	14	30	51	5	28	34

== Postseason ==
=== NCAA basketball tournament ===
- Raleigh Regional
  - Louisville 62, Liberty 42
  - Louisville 62, Louisiana State 52
  - Louisville 56, Baylor 39
  - Louisville 77, Maryland 60
- Final Four
  - Louisville 61, Oklahoma 59
  - Connecticut 76, Louisville 54

== Team players drafted into the WNBA ==
Round	Pick	Player	NBA club
1	1	Angel McCoughtry	Atlanta Dream
3	39	Candyce Bingham	San Antonio Silver Stars

== See also ==
- Kentucky–Louisville rivalry
