= 2008–09 Connecticut Huskies women's basketball team =

Intercollegiate basketball season

2008–09 Connecticut Huskies women's basketball

NCAA tournament National Champions Big East tournament champions Big East regular season champions Maggie Dixon Classic champions Caribbean Classic champions
- Conference: Big East Conference

Ranking
- Coaches: No. 1
- AP: No. 1
- Record: 39–0 (16–0 Big East)
- Head coach: Geno Auriemma
- Associate head coach: Chris Dailey
- Assistant coaches: Jamelle Elliott; Shea Ralph
- Home arena: Harry A. Gampel Pavilion

2008–09 Big East Conference women's basketball standings
	Conf.				Overall
Team	W		L	PCT	W		L	PCT
No. 1 Connecticut†	16	–	0	1.000	39	–	0	1.000
No. 7 Louisville	14	–	2	.875	34	–	5	.872
No. 15 Pittsburgh	12	–	4	.750	25	–	8	.758
No. 23 Notre Dame	10	–	6	.625	22	–	9	.710
DePaul	10	–	6	.625	23	–	10	.697
Villanova	10	–	6	.625	19	–	14	.576
Rutgers	9	–	7	.563	21	–	13	.618
South Florida	8	–	8	.500	27	–	10	.730
Georgetown	7	–	9	.438	20	–	14	.588
Marquette	7	–	9	.438	17	–	16	.515
Syracuse	5	–	11	.313	17	–	15	.531
West Virginia	5	–	11	.313	18	–	15	.545
St. John's	4	–	12	.250	19	–	15	.559
Seton Hall	4	–	12	.250	17	–	14	.548
Providence	4	–	12	.250	10	–	20	.333
Cincinnati	3	–	13	.188	14	–	17	.452
† 2009 Big East tournament winner As of April 4, 2009; Rankings from AP Poll

The 2008–09 Connecticut Huskies women's basketball team represented the University of Connecticut in the 2008–09 NCAA Division I women's basketball season. Coached by Geno Auriemma, the Huskies played their home games at the Hartford Civic Center in Hartford, Connecticut, and on campus at the Harry A. Gampel Pavilion in Storrs, Connecticut, and are a member of the Big East Conference. They enjoyed an undefeated season and won their sixth NCAA championship by defeating the Louisville Cardinals, 76–54.

== Regular season ==
=== Pre-season ===
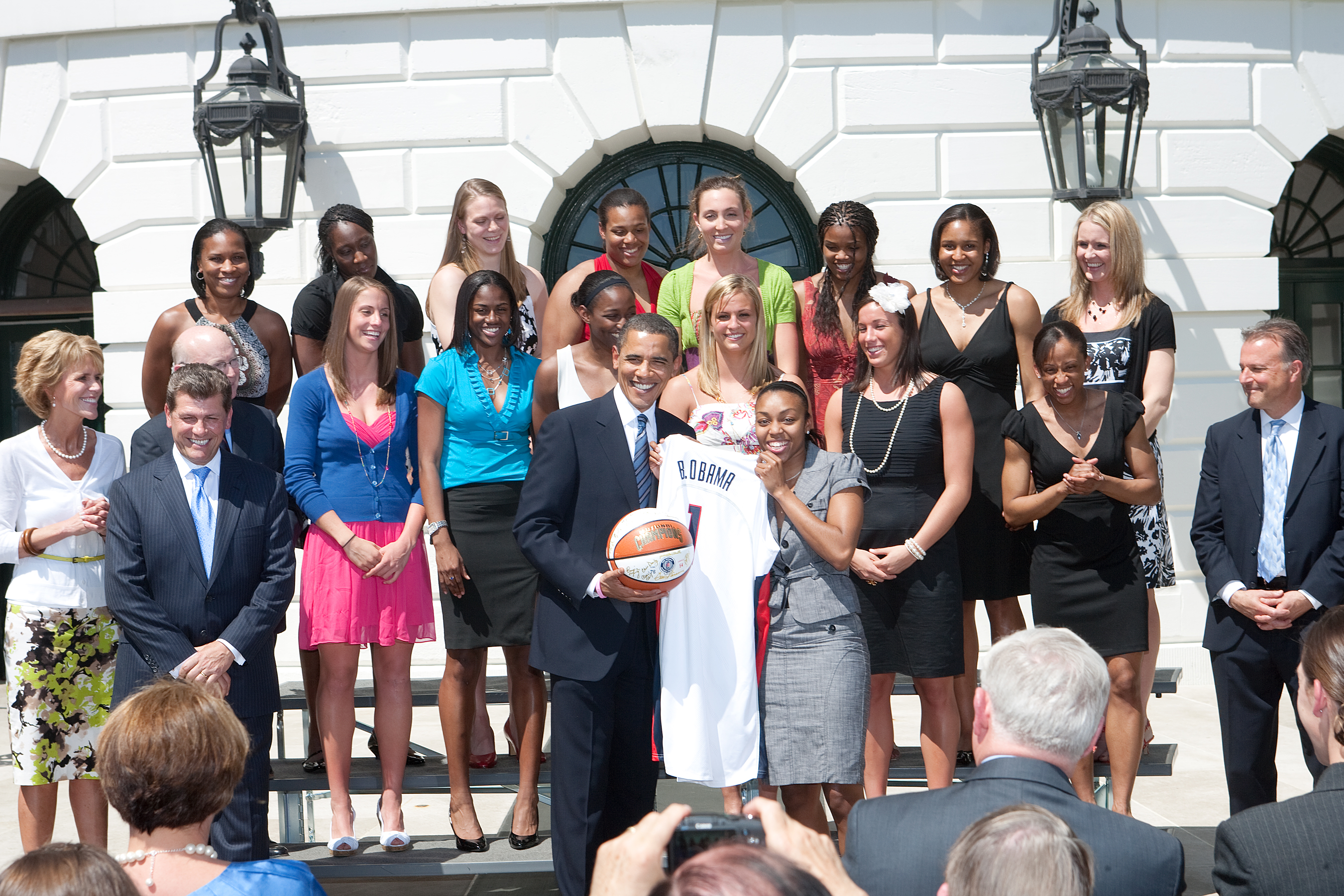
The players, coaches, and other staff of the 2008–2009 UConn Huskies, winners of the 2009 national championship, are honored at the White House by President Barack Obama on April 27, 2009.

Both major pre-season polls ranked the Huskies number 1, each just one vote shy of unanimous. The AP Top 25 poll included all but one vote for Connecticut, with a single vote for Stanford, and the ESPN/USA Today Poll had all but one vote for Connecticut, with a single vote for Tennessee. The team returned much of the previous year's team. Of the departing seniors, only Brittany Hunter started more than half the team's game, although Mel Thomas failed to reach that mark due to a career-ending injury.

The Huskies started with a pair of triple digit scoring pre-season games. The first game was against Division II Stonehill College in nearby North Easton, Massachusetts. It was the first chance for fans to see freshman Caroline Doty, Tiffany Hayes, and Heather Buck in action. Caroline and Tiffany both scored in double digits, and Heather had three rebounds and a blocked shot. The final score was in favor of UConn, 100–49. The second pre-season game was even more lopsided, with UConn prevailing over Team SRP 103–37.

=== Non conference opener ===
The regular season opening game was against Georgia Tech, a team unranked in the pre-season. The game would be tied at halftime, with Connecticut pulling ahead late to win by eleven points 82–71. Connecticut would win their next three games easily, beating San Diego State and Rhode Island at home, and BYU in Utah, each win by at least 45 points.

The following game would bring #4 ranked Oklahoma to Connecticut. Characterized as a "significant test" by ESPN's Graham Hays, Connecticut would win easily by 32 points, 106–72. UConn would then play nearby Holy Cross, winning easily 96–37. In this game Caroline Doty would hit her tenth consecutive three-point goal, a UConn school record, and four off the national record.

On December 14, the Huskies competed in the Maggie Dixon Classic at Madison Square Garden and defeated Penn State by a score of 77–63. From December 18 to the 21, the Huskies competed in the Caribbean Classic held in Cancún, Mexico. The Huskies were undefeated at the tournament. After returning from Mexico, the Huskies traveled to South Carolina for their fifth consecutive road game. The team shot 57% from the field, and held their opponents to under 40%. Tina Charles has 21 points and 14 rebounds, helping lead the Huskies to their eleventh victory of the season.

Connecticut hosted Hartford on New year's Eve. The Hartford Hawks, coached by former UConn star Jen Rizzotti, were no match, falling behind by 33 at halftime. Renee Montgomery hit 9 of 11 in the first half, and did not return in the second half after taking an elbow to the mouth. LSU came to Connecticut for the first game of the new year. Both teams had been to the prior Final Four, each losing in the semi-final round. However, LSU had graduated five seniors, so the Lady Tigers were not expected to be as strong as the previous year's team. The pollsters concurred, not giving LSU a single vote for a top 25 position in either of the two major polls. LSU played stronger than their ranking, losing by 13 for the third closest match of the season to that date. Renee Montgomery's six assists, brought her to 1500 points and 500 assists for her career, a mark reach by only two other UConn players, Diana Taurasi and Jen Rizzotti.

=== Beginning of conference play ===
The Big East opening game would be against South Florida USF would go on to win the WNIT this season, but UConn was far too strong on this day. USF was one of the nation's best scoring team, scoring over 100 on five occasions, including 126 against Grambling State. UConn decided to work on defense, and held USF to just over 25% from the field. USF scored only 11 points in the second half.

The next game would be against West Virginia, in West Virginia, the home of UConn senior Renee Montgomery. In her first game in West Virginia, two years prior, she scored seven points. This time she would lead the team in points (28), assists(5), and steals(2) to lead UConn to a 30-point victory in front of her home town crowd. Three days later, UConn would play at home against DePaul. UConn built a 15-point lead by halftime against the unranked team, but despite falling another ten points behind, DePaul would play them even in the second half. The final score was 77–62, in favor of UConn.

Maya Moore entered the game on 17 January 2009 against Syracuse 29 points shy of 1,000 for her career. She would score 40 to easily surpass that mark, reaching the plateau faster than any other female in UConn history. However, the game would also be notable for a season-ending injury to starter Caroline Doty, reported at the time to be a knee injury. Doty would score 17 points before halftime, but just before halftime, she injured her knee during a fast break. It was the same knee she injured in 2007. Moore's forty points is only the second forty-point performance in UConn women's history; the other is Nykesha Sales' 46 against Stamford in 1997. UConn would win the game 107–53.

The following game was a highly anticipated showdown between the #1- and #2-ranked teams in the nation. Both Connecticut and North Carolina entered the game 17–0 on the season. Connecticut had the higher ranking, but would need to replace starter Carolyn Doty. Her knee injury in the prior game would turn out to be a season-ending ACL tear. The result would be anticlimactic, as UConn reached a double-digit lead early in the game, extended to a 46–30 halftime lead, and finished with a 30-point victory, 88–58. The five starters, including Lorin Dixon in her first start of the season, would each score in double digits, led by Renee Montgomery with 21.

The next game against Cincinnati would be even more lopsided. UConn outscored the Bearcats in the first half 39–7. The seven points allowed in the first half were only one point off the school record of six in a half. While Cincinnati would outscore the Huskies in the second half 27–26, the outcome was not in doubt.

The 26 January game against Louisville would pit UConn against the team they beat by only six in the previous year's Big East tournament title game. Louisville was ranked 10th in the nation, and still had Angel McCoughtry, winner of the Big East Conference Women's Basketball Player of the Year in 2007. Angle would live up to her reputation with 24 points and 14 rebounds, but it wasn't enough, as Maye Moore scored 27 to lead UConn to a 93–65 win.

The next game was against unranked Georgetown. UConn would win by 19, with five players scoring in double digits, but the game was surprisingly close, given that the average margin of victory for UConn was 34 at that point. The following game was against Rutgers, a team that has often given UConn a strong challenge, winning half of the last ten meetings. Rutgers would stay close in the first half, entering the half down only six 34–28, but UConn would pull away in the second half behind a double-double by Moore (24 points, 10 rebounds).

Marquette would endure another double-double by Moore (22 points, 10 rebounds), in their 83–49 loss to UConn on 7 February. The following game against unranked St. John's on 11 February, started as if it would be another rout. UConn led by 15 at halftime, and increased the lead to 20. The St. John's team responded and cut the lead to seven, before UConn regrouped and finished with a 13-point victory, 77–64. Maya would contribute another double-double (20 points, 10 rebounds), while Renee Montgomery and Tina Charles each scored 21 points.

The next game would be the last game of the season at Gampel Arena. The game itself would be anticlimactic, as UConn easily beat Pittsburgh 95–42. The highlight of the evening would be the induction into the Huskies of Honor for Renee Montgomery, kept a secret from her until the announcement. One of her first reactions, after the shock of the announcement, was the regret that her parents wouldn't see it, but seconds later, her parents would walk onto the floor. They had been in town, but shared the secret. Renee is the first active player at UConn to be so honored. She would go on to score a team high 20 points.

On the 18th of February, Connecticut played Providence in Providence. The Huskies scored the first eleven points, and never trailed. The Huskies started the second half in even more impressive fashion, scoring the first 25 points of the half. UConn would win easily 75–39.

The following game was against Notre Dame, ranked 24th at the time. The Notre Dame Irish would give Connecticut their toughest match of the year. The Irish lead most of the first half. Although UConn would go to the half with a three-point lead, Notre Dame outscored UConn in the initial minutes of the second half, with a lead of 43–41 at one time. Prior to this game the Huskies had trailed for only a combined 27 minutes all season. Connecticut would retake the lead, and finished the game with a ten-point margin, the closest game of the season to that date.

On the 24th of February, UConn hosted Villanova. Tina Charles had a double-double with 19 points and 10 rebounds to lead UConn to the win 74–47. Four days later, Seton Hall came to Hartford, for the last regular season game of the year. As a surprise for the departing seniors, Maya Moore and Kaili McLaren sang the national anthem. Moore then went on to score 18 points, to help lead UConn to an 81–50 win, and guarantee a share of the Big East regular-season title.

On 2 March 2009, UConn played its last regular season game against rival Rutgers. UConn moved out to a 16-point halftime lead 36–20, but Rutgers outscored UConn in the second half to make the final score ten points, tied for closest result of the season. The win leaves the Huskies still undefeated on the season, now 30–0.

=== Big East tournament ===
Connecticut opened the Big East tournament against South Florida, a team it had beaten by 46 points earlier in the season. This game would be closer, but not by much. Kalana Greene led the Huskies with a season-high 20 points, scoring 18 points before halftime, and leading the Huskies to a 47–10 halftime lead. USF would match the UConn production in the second half, but the 37 point margin held. The final score was 79–42.

The second tournament game was against Villanova, a team UConn had beaten by 27 points less than two weeks earlier. However, the game was tied at 25 apiece, with under six minutes to go in the first half. Maya Moore then helped lead the team on a 23–2 run to put the game out of reach. The Huskies won 72–42.

The final game, on 10 March, for the Big East tournament championship, was against Louisville, ranked #7 in the country. The Cardinals who would go on to play in the Finals of the NCAA tournament, were no match for UConn on this day. Maya Moore left the game with eight minutes to go, having scored 28 points. At that time the Louisville team had scored 27. UConn would win the game in convincing fashion, 75–36.

== Roster ==
2008–09 Connecticut Huskies women's basketball team
Players
Coaches

Pos.	#	Name	Height	Year	Previous school	Hometown
F/C	21	Heather Buck	6 ft 3 in (1.91 m)	Fr	Stonington	Stonington, Conn.
C	31	Tina Charles	6 ft 4 in (1.93 m)	Jr	Christ the King	Jamaica, N.Y.
G	30	Lorin Dixon	5 ft 4 in (1.63 m)	So	Christ the King	Springfield Gardens, N.Y.
G	5	Caroline Doty	5 ft 10 in (1.78 m)	Fr	Germantown Academy	Doylestown, Pa.
G	13	Jacquie Fernandes	5 ft 9 in (1.75 m)	Jr	Heritage Christian	Pawcatuck, Conn.
F	22	Meghan Gardler	6 ft 0 in (1.83 m)	Jr	Cardinal O'Hara	Springfield, Pa.
G	32	Kalana Greene	5 ft 10 in (1.78 m)	Jr	Timberland	Saint Stephen, South Carolina
G	3	Tiffany Hayes	5 ft 10 in (1.78 m)	Fr	Winter Haven	Lakeland, Florida
F/C	51	Cassie Kerns	6 ft 3 in (1.91 m)	Sr	Valparaiso	Valparaiso, Ind.
C	12	Jessica McCormack (redshirt)	6 ft 5 in (1.96 m)	RS So	Northcote College/UW	Auckland, New Zealand
F	41	Kaili McLaren	6 ft 2 in (1.88 m)	Jr	Our Lady of Good Counsel	Washington, D.C.
G	20	Renee Montgomery (C)	5 ft 7 in (1.7 m)	Sr	South Charleston	St. Albans, West Virginia
F	23	Maya Moore (C)	6 ft 0 in (1.83 m)	So	Collins Hill	Lawrenceville, Georgia
G	2	Tahirah Williams	6 ft 0 in (1.83 m)	Sr	Immaculate Heart Academy	Montclair, New Jersey

Head coach

Geno Auriemma

Assistant coach(es)

Chris Dailey
Jamelle Elliott
Shea Ralph

Legend

- (C) Team captain
- (S) Suspended
- (I) Ineligible
- (W) Walk-on
- Injured
- Current redshirt

Roster
Last update: 2013-08-23

== Player stats ==
Player	Games played	Minutes	Field goals	Three pointers	Free throws	Rebounds	Assists	Blocks	Steals	Points
Maya Moore	39	1209	284	90	96	348	127	59	76	754
Renee Montgomery	39	1237	226	99	93	82	199	9	61	644
Tina Charles	39	982	259	0	124	348	41	62	35	642
Kalana Greene	39	990	141	6	50	181	68	11	37	338
Caroline Doty	17	406	52	30	13	57	33	4	16	147
Tiffany Hayes	39	1002	109	46	63	156	102	15	44	327
Kaili McLaren	38	581	61	0	37	130	73	22	19	159
Tahirah Williams	33	245	33	0	22	62	22	4	9	88
Lorin Dixon	39	604	28	2	31	63	71	2	17	89
Meghan Gardler	32	335	19	5	15	62	21	3	12	58
Jacquie Fernandes	30	141	8	3	4	17	2	0	3	23
Cassie Kerns	18	68	2	0	1	5	3	2	2	5

== Schedule ==
Date time, TV	Rank^{#}	Opponent^{#}	Result	Record	Site (attendance) city, state
Regular season
November 16*; 2:00PM, CPTV	No. 1	GEORGIA TECH	W 82-71	1–0	Harry A. Gampel Pavilion (8871); Storrs, Connecticut
November 20*; 7:00PM, CPTV	No. 1	SAN DIEGO STATE	W 99-55	2–0	XL Center (10313); Hartford, Connecticut
November 22*; 1:05 p.m., CPTV	No. 1	RHODE ISLAND	W 91-43	3–0	XL Center (10516); Hartford, Connecticut
November 25*; 7:00 pm, CPTV	No. 1	at BYU Cougars	W 96-47	4–0	Marriott Center BYU (3109); Provo, Utah
November 30*; 8:15 pm, ESPN	No. 1	OKLAHOMA	W 106-78	5–0	Harry A. Gampel Pavilion (9688); Storrs, Connecticut
December 03*; 7:30 p.m., CPTV	No. 1	HOLY CROSS	W 96-37	6–0	Harry A. Gampel Pavilion (8312); Storrs, Connecticut
December 14*; 2:30 p.m., ESPNU	No. 1	vs Penn State	W 77-63	7–0	Madison Square Garden (9417); New York
December 18*; 4:30 p.m., –	No. 1	vs Washington	W 109-51	8–0	Moon Palace Resort (350); Cancún, Mexico
December 19*; 6:00 p.m., CPTV	No. 1	vs Northern Colorado	W 85-40	9–0	Moon Palace Resort (350); Cancún, Mexico
December 21*; 3:30 p.m., CPTV	No. 1	vs Florida State	W 83-71	10–0	Moon Palace Resort (350); Cancún, Mexico
December 28*; 3 p.m., –	No. 1	at South Carolina	W 77-48	11–0	Colonial Life Arena (5113); Columbia, South Carolina
December 31*; 12:00PM, CPTV	No. 1	HARTFORD	W 78-41	12–0	XL Center (12803); Hartford, Connecticut
January 03*; 12:00PM, CBS	No. 1	LSU	W 76-63	13–0	XL Center (13922); Hartford, Connecticut
January 06; 7:00 p.m., CPTV	No. 1	at USF	W 83-37	14–0 (1-0)	USF Sun Dome (4290); Tampa, Florida
January 10; 7 p.m., CPTV	No. 1	at West Virginia	W 85-55	15–0 (2-0)	WVU Coliseum (3167); Morgantown, West Virginia
January 13; 7:30 pm, CPTV	No. 1	DEPAUL	W 77-62	16–0 (3-0)	Harry A. Gampel Pavilion (8424); Storrs, Connecticut
January 17; 2:00 pm, CPTV	No. 1	SYRACUSE	W 107-53	17–0 (4-0)	XL Center (13086); Hartford, Connecticut
January 19; 7:00 pm, ESPN2	No. 1	at North Carolina	W 88-58	18–0	Smith Center (12722); Chapel Hill, North Carolina
January 24; 7:00 p.m., CPTV	No. 1	at Cincinnati	W 65-34	19–0 (5-0)	Fifth Third Arena (2346); Cincinnati, Ohio
January 26; 7:30PM, ESPN2	No. 1	LOUISVILLE	W 93-65	20–0 (6-0)	Harry A. Gampel Pavilion (9428); Storrs, Connecticut
January 31; 3 p.m., CPTV	No. 1	at Georgetown	W 80-61	21–0 (7-0)	McDonogh Arena (2413); Washington, D.C.
February 03; 8:00 pm, CBSCS	No. 1	RUTGERS	W 75-56	22–0 (8-0)	XL Center (12910); Hartford, Connecticut
February 07; 7 p.m., CPTV	No. 1	at Marquette	W 83-49	23–0 (9-0)	Al McGuire Center (4000); Milwaukee, Wisconsin
February 11; 7 p.m., CPTV	No. 1	at St. John's	W 77-64	24–0 (10-0)	Carnesecca Arena (2189); Queens, New York
February 15; 3:45 pm, ESPN2	No. 1	PITTSBURGH	W 95-42	25–0 (11-0)	Harry A. Gampel Pavilion (9987); Storrs, Connecticut
February 18; 7:00 pm, CPTV	No. 1	at Providence	W 75-39	26–0 (12-0)	Alumni Hall (2000); Providence, Rhode Island
February 22; 2:00 pm, ESPNU	No. 1	NOTRE DAME	W 76-66	27–0 (13-0)	XL Center (14533); Hartford, Connecticut
February 24; 7:30 pm, CPTV	No. 1	VILLANOVA	W 74-47	28–0 (14-0)	Harry A. Gampel Pavilion (8746); Storrs, Connecticut
February 28; 7:30 pm, CPTV	No. 1	SETON HALL	W 81-50	29–0 (15-0)	XL Center (13372); Hartford, Connecticut
March 02; 7:30 p.m., ESPN2	No. 1	at Rutgers	W 69-59	30–0 (16-0)	Louis Brown Athletic Center (7151); Piscataway, New Jersey
2009 Big East Women's Basketball Tournament
March 08; 2:00 p.m., ESPNU	No. 1	vs USF	W 79-42	31–0	XL Center (9270); Hartford, Connecticut
March 09; 6:00 p.m., ESPNU	No. 1	vs Villanova	W 72-42	32–0	XL Center (–); Hartford, Connecticut
March 10; 7:00 p.m., ESPN	No. 1	vs Louisville	W 75-36	33–0	XL Center (10030); Hartford, Connecticut
2009 NCAA Division I women's basketball tournament
March 22*; 12:00 pm, ESPN2	No. 1	vs Vermont	W 104-65	34–0	Harry A. Gampel Pavilion (8548); Storrs, Connecticut
March 24*; 7:00 pm, ESPN2	No. 1	vs Florida	W 87-59	35–0	Harry A. Gampel Pavilion (8237); Storrs, Connecticut
March 29*; 12:05pm, ESPN	No. 1	vs California	W 77-53	36–0	Sovereign Bank Arena (6,461); Trenton, New Jersey
March 31*; 7:00pm, ESPN	No. 1	vs Arizona State University	W 83-64	37–0	Sovereign Bank Arena (4758); Trenton, New Jersey
April 05*; 8:37 pm CT, ESPN	No. 1	vs Stanford	W 83-64	38–0	Scottrade Center (18621); St. Louis, Missouri
April 07*; 7:42 pm CT, ESPN	No. 1	vs Louisville	W 76-54	39–0	Scottrade Center (18478); St. Louis, Missouri
*Non-conference game. ^{#}Rankings from AP Poll. (#) Tournament seedings in parentheses.

- On April 27, the Huskies visited the White House and met President Barack Obama. The President took the University of Connecticut's women's basketball team over to the outdoor half-court at the White House to shoot hoops.

== Awards and honors ==
- Geno Auriemma, Winged Foot Award
- Tina Charles, Tournament Most Outstanding Player
- Renee Montgomery, Wooden All-American selection
- Maya Moore, AP All-America first team
- Maya Moore, Big East Player of the Year
- Maya Moore, Big East tournament Most Outstanding Performer
- Maya Moore, CoSIDA/ESPN Academic All-America First Team
- Maya Moore, Naismith Award
- Maya Moore, National Collegiate Athletic Association (NCAA) Division I State Farm Coaches' All-America Basketball Team
- Maya Moore, State Farm Wade Trophy Player of the Year (2009 Division 1)
- Maya Moore, USBWA National Player of the Year by the United States Basketball Writers Association
- Maya Moore, Women's NCAA Final Four All-Tournament Team
- Maya Moore, Wooden All-American selection
- Maya Moore, Wooden Award

== Team players drafted into the WNBA ==
Round	Pick	Player	NBA club
1	4	Renee Montgomery	Minnesota Lynx

== See also ==
- 2008–09 Connecticut Huskies men's basketball team
