= Meghan Gardler =

American basketball player

Amicale Steesel
- Position: Power forward / center
- League: Luxembourg Basketball

Personal information
- Born: April 11, 1988 (age 38) Springfield, Pennsylvania, U.S.
- Listed height: 5 ft 11 in (1.80 m)

Career information
- High school: Cardinal O'Hara (Marple, Pennsylvania)
- College: UConn (2006–2010)

Career highlights
- 2× NCAA champion (2009, 2010)

Meghan Elizabeth Gardler (born April 11, 1988) is an American women's basketball player who played professional basketball in Europe. She won two National Championships with the UConn Huskies, then continued to play basketball in Sweden and Luxembourg. She won Diekirch League MVP in the 2012–2013 season and averaged 26.7 ppg. She graduated from Cardinal O'Hara High School and was named Philadelphia Catholic MVP. From 2006 to 2010 Gardler played for Connecticut Huskies. In 2010, she started her pro career in Sweden (KFUM Umea Comets).

== Connecticut statistics ==
Legend
GP	Games played	GS	Games started	MPG	Minutes per game
FG%	Field goal percentage	3P%	3-point field goal percentage	FT%	Free throw percentage
RPG	Rebounds per game	APG	Assists per game	SPG	Steals per game
BPG	Blocks per game	PPG	Points per game	**Bold**	Career high

Year	Team	GP	Points	FG%	3P%	FT%	RPG	APG	SPG	BPG	PPG
2006–07	Connecticut	29	38	23.5	18.9	53.8	1.4	0.3	0.1	0.2	1.3
2007–08	Connecticut	32	80	34.7	21.9	65.6	2.0	**0.8**	0.5	**0.3**	2.5
2008–09	Connecticut	32	58	40.4	31.3	55.6	1.9	0.7	0.4	0.1	1.8
2009–10	Connecticut	**37**	**163**	**48.1**	**34.7**	**75.4**	**2.8**	0.6	**0.5**	0.2	**4.4**
Career	Connecticut	130	339	38.6	26.9	66.9	2.1	0.6	0.4	0.2	2.6
