= 2008–09 South Florida Bulls women's basketball team =

Intercollegiate basketball season

2008–09 South Florida Bulls women's basketball

USF Shootout

WNIT Champions
- Conference: Big East Conference (1979–2013)
- Record: 27–10 (8–8 Big East)
- Head coach: Jose Fernandez
- Assistant coaches: Jeff Osterman; Andrea Williams; Michele Woods-Baxter
- Home arena: USF Sun Dome

2008–09 Big East Conference women's basketball standings
	Conf.				Overall
Team	W		L	PCT	W		L	PCT
No. 1 Connecticut†	16	–	0	1.000	39	–	0	1.000
No. 7 Louisville	14	–	2	.875	34	–	5	.872
No. 15 Pittsburgh	12	–	4	.750	25	–	8	.758
No. 23 Notre Dame	10	–	6	.625	22	–	9	.710
DePaul	10	–	6	.625	23	–	10	.697
Villanova	10	–	6	.625	19	–	14	.576
Rutgers	9	–	7	.563	21	–	13	.618
South Florida	8	–	8	.500	27	–	10	.730
Georgetown	7	–	9	.438	20	–	14	.588
Marquette	7	–	9	.438	17	–	16	.515
Syracuse	5	–	11	.313	17	–	15	.531
West Virginia	5	–	11	.313	18	–	15	.545
St. John's	4	–	12	.250	19	–	15	.559
Seton Hall	4	–	12	.250	17	–	14	.548
Providence	4	–	12	.250	10	–	20	.333
Cincinnati	3	–	13	.188	14	–	17	.452
† 2009 Big East tournament winner As of April 4, 2009; Rankings from AP Poll

The 2008–09 South Florida Bulls women's basketball team represented the University of South Florida in the 2008–09 NCAA Division I women's basketball season. The Bulls ended the season with 27 wins. The 27th win of the season for the Bulls was the best in USF history - for men or women - and the highest win total by any Division I team in the state of Florida. USF capped their sixth postseason appearance by winning the 2009 WNIT Tournament.

== Exhibition ==
Date	Opponent	Location	Bulls points	Opp. points	Record
Nov. 1/08	Miami Sun	Tampa, FL	91	67	1-0
Nov. 5/08	DT3	Tampa, FL	81	55	2-0

== Regular season ==
=== Roster ===
Number	Name	Height	Position	Class
1	Jasmine Wynne	1.7 m (5 ft 7 in)	Guard	Freshman
2	Leondra Doomes-Stephens	1.78 m (5 ft 10 in)	Guard/forward	Sophomore
5	Dominique English	1.68 m (5 ft 6 in)	Guard	Sophomore
10	Sequoyah Griffin	1.75 m (5 ft 9 in)	Forward	Sophomore
11	Porche Grant	1.88 m (6 ft 2 in)	Forward	Junior
15	Allyson Speed	1.75 m (5 ft 9 in)	Guard	Junior
21	Janae Stokes	1.7 m (5 ft 7 in)	Guard	Junior
23	Jessica Lawson	1.91 m (6 ft 3 in)	Center	Junior
33	Daleisha Carn	1.83 m (6 ft 0 in)	Guard	Sophomore
42	Melissa Dalembert	1.91 m (6 ft 3 in)	Forward	Junior

=== Schedule ===
- The Bulls participated in the USF Shootout on November 15 and 16.
- The Bulls participated in the Paradise Jam from November 27 to 29. The Bulls finished second in the Reef Division.

Date	Opponent	Location	Bulls points	Opp. points	Record
Nov. 15/08	Central Connecticut	Tampa, FL	100	41	1-0
Nov. 16/08	Loyola, MD	Tampa, FL	94	46	2-0
Nov. 18/08	Stetson	Tampa, FL	103	55	3-0
Nov. 23/08	Coppin State	Tampa, FL	97	43	4-0
Nov. 27/08	California	St. Thomas, US Virgin Islands	55	85	4-1
Nov. 28/08	Iowa	St. Thomas, US Virgin Islands	82	79	5-1
Nov. 29/08	Texas Tech	St. Thomas, US Virgin Islands	71	61	6-1
Dec. 5/08	Florida International	Tampa, FL	99	71	7-1
Dec. 14/08	North Florida	Tampa, FL	90	44	8-1
Dec. 18/08	Grambling	Tampa, FL	126	62	9-1
Dec. 20/08	Northern Arizona	Tampa, FL	82	43	10-1
Dec. 21/08	Southern	Tampa, FL	100	47	11-1
Dec. 28/08	Jackson State	Tampa, FL	110	51	12-1
Dec. 30/08	Tulane	New Orleans, LA	80	66	13-1
Jan. 3/09	Marquette	Milwaukee, WI	60	68	13-2
Jan. 6/09	Connecticut	Tampa, FL	37	83	13-3
Jan. 10/09	St. John’s	Tampa, FL	81	71	14-3
Jan. 14/09	Louisville	Tampa, FL	60	76	14-4
Jan. 17/09	Pittsburgh	Pittsburgh, PA	47	79	14-5
Jan. 20/09	Providence	Providence, RI	86	62	15-5
Jan. 24/09	Georgetown	Tampa, FL	68	86	15-6
Jan. 31/09	Rutgers	New Brunswick, NJ	59	58	16-6
Feb. 3/09	Marquette	Tampa, FL	56	71	16-7
Feb. 8/09	Syracuse	Syracuse, NY	88	79	17-7
Feb. 14/09	Seton Hall	Tampa, FL	80	51	18-7
Feb. 17/09	Notre Dame	Tampa, FL	79	86	18-8
Feb. 21/09	West Virginia	Morgantown, WV	75	90	18-9

== Player stats ==
Player	Games played	Minutes	Field goals	Three pointers	Free throws	Rebounds	Assists	Blocks	Steals	Points
Shantia Grace	37	1165	163	64	160	117	175	7	58	550
Janae Stokes	36	878	153	116	30	91	53	2	25	452
Jazmin Sepulveda	37	1143	150	68	71	125	136	11	96	439
Jessica Lawson	36	797	151	0	79	240	9	44	31	381
Brittany Denson	37	966	105	0	68	248	45	100	33	278
Alexis Givands	12	258	38	3	4	37	24	1	20	83
Jasmine Wynne	36	694	92	13	46	65	83	5	57	243
Porche Grant	37	765	93	0	42	284	20	30	33	228
Melissa Dalembert	31	287	46	0	25	87	1	9	5	117
Allyson Speed	27	223	17	10	5	24	19	1	7	49
Ashley Sanders	34	257	19	0	19	59	16	5	16	57
Crystal Ayers	6	24	2	1	0	3	1	0	2	5
Erin Moody	5	14	2	0	0	2	0	0	0	4
Kelsey Varney	2	5	0	0	0	1	1	0	0	0

== Postseason ==
=== WNIT Tournament ===
- Quarterfinal (Sunday, March 29)
  - South Florida 80, St. Bonaventure 66
- Semifinal (Wednesday, April 1)
  - South Florida 82, Boston College 65
- Championship (Saturday, April 4)
  - South Florida 75, Kansas 71

==== WNIT player stats ====
Player	Games played	Minutes	Field goals	Three pointers	Free throws	Rebounds	Assists	Blocks	Steals	Points
Shantia Grace	5	181	21	7	29	14	29	2	7	78
Jasmine Wynne	5	151	21	3	16	10	12	0	4	61
Jessica Lawson	5	128	26	0	9	54	1	6	5	61
Janae Stokes	5	116	21	12	3	5	5	1	0	57
Brittany Denson	5	162	21	0	13	41	7	14	4	55
Jazmin Sepulveda	5	167	18	10	6	12	9	2	10	52
Porche Grant	5	105	13	0	3	39	2	6	3	29
Melissa Dalembert	4	7	2	0	0	3	0	0	1	4
Allyson Speed	2	2	1	0	0	0	1	0	0	2
Ashley Sanders	4	6	0	0	0	0	0	0	0	0

- In the WNIT championship, the stat leaders were as follows:

Player	Category
Sepulveda	Points (18)
Grant	Rebounds (10)
Grace	Assists (5)
Sepulveda	Steals (2)
Denson	Blocks (4)

== Awards and honors ==
- Alexis Givands, USF Shootout All-Tournament Team
- Shantia Grace, All-Big East point guard
- Janae Stokes, USF Shootout Most Valuable Player
- Jasmine Wynne, USF Shootout All-Tournament Team

== Team players drafted into the WNBA ==
No one from the Bulls was selected in the 2009 WNBA draft.
