= Jefferson County Airpark =

Airport near Steubenville, Ohio, US

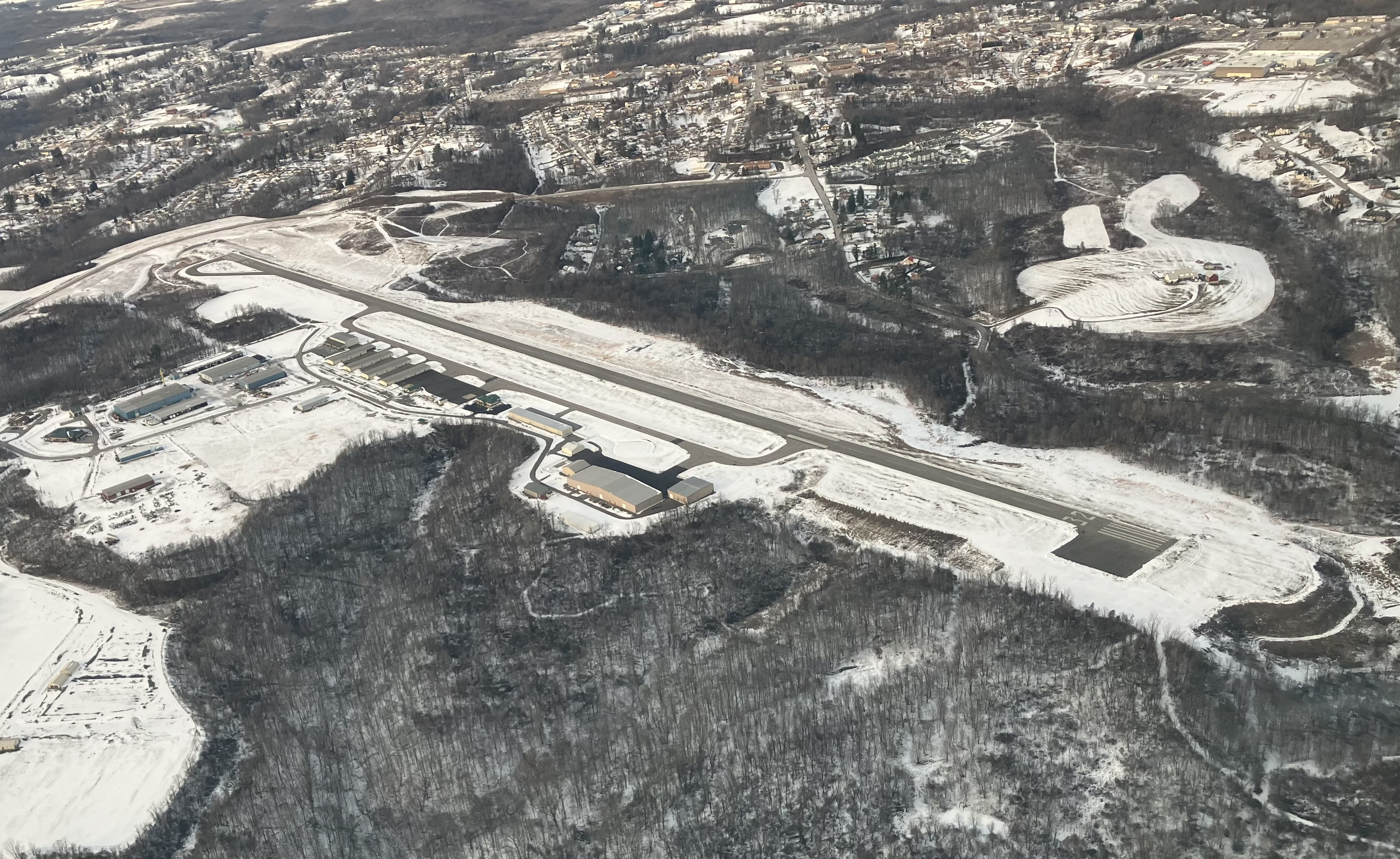
- IATA: none; ICAO: none; FAA LID: 2G2

Summary
- Airport type: Public
- Owner: Jefferson County Commissioners
- Operator: Jefferson County Regional Airport Authority
- Serves: Steubenville, Ohio
- Location: Cross Creek Township, Ohio
- Elevation AMSL: 1,030 ft (310 m)
- Coordinates: 40°21′36.8″N 080°42′03.2″W
- Website: JeffersonCountyAirpark.org

Maps
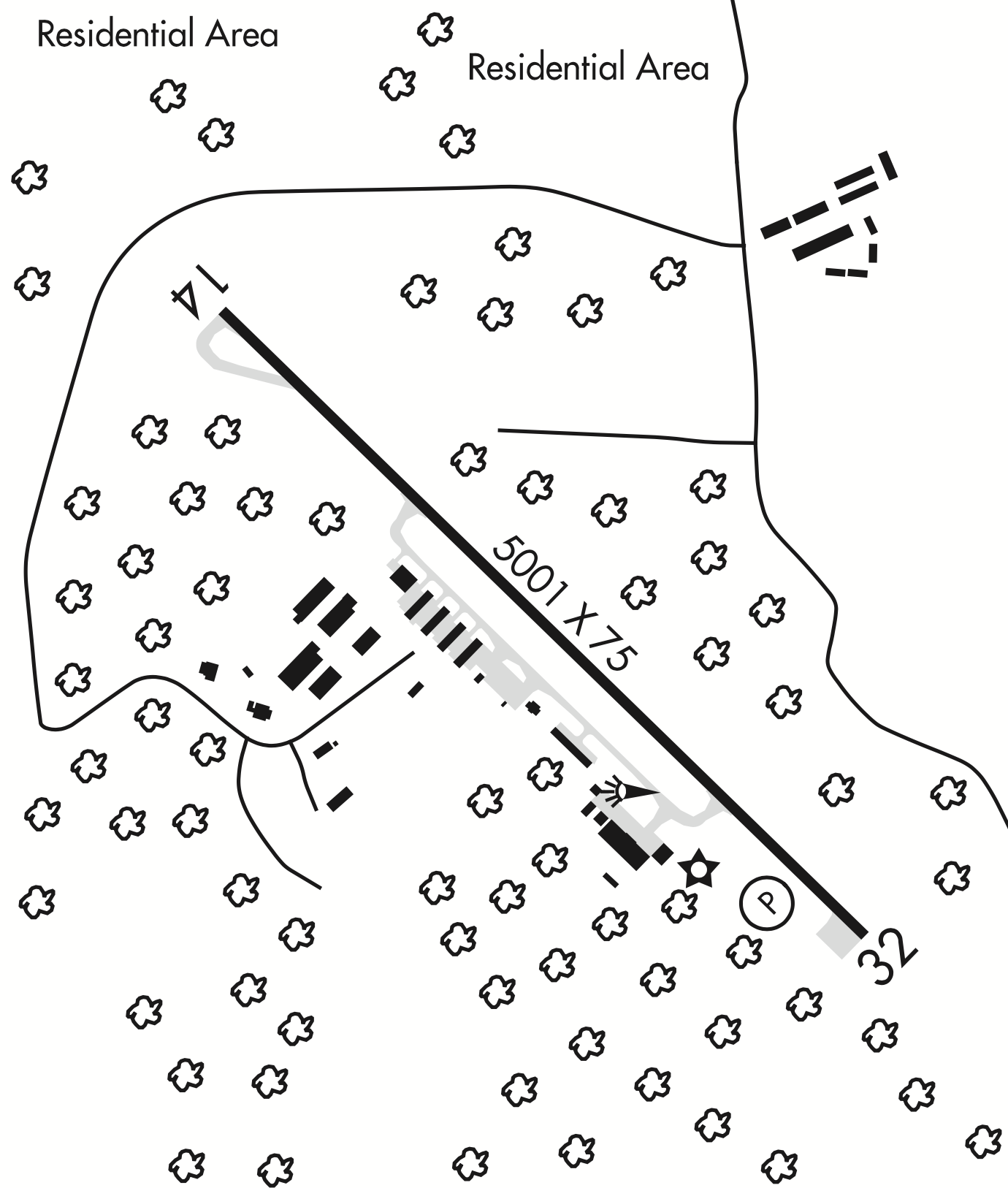

- Location in Ohio Location in United States

Runways
Direction	Length		Surface
Direction	ft	m	Surface
14/32	5,001	1,341	Paved

Statistics (2022)
- Aircraft operations: 10,585
- Based aircraft: 34
- Source: Federal Aviation Administration

The Jefferson County Airpark (FAA LID: 2G2), also known as Geary A. Bates Airport, is a full-service general aviation public airport near Steubenville, Ohio, U.S., part of the Pittsburgh Combined Statistical Area that serves small and mid-sized private, corporate and commercial traffic. The airport serves transients traveling to and from Eastern Ohio, the Northern Panhandle of West Virginia, and Western Pennsylvania (Pittsburgh).

== History ==
The airport was founded in 1946 by R. G. Pier, an aerial gunner in World War I. At various points throughout the following decades, the field was known as the Steubenville-Pier Airport, the Wintersville-Pier Airport or the Steubenville-Wintersville-Pier Airport.

The airport was leased to Glenn W. Dye in September 1953. The airport was again leased to Miller Air Lines in early July 1959 with plans to offer airline service.

The county obtained an option to purchase the airport in late March 1965. Approximately three months later, the site was tentatively approved by the FAA pending a finding that access roads and other facilities could be built. However, by December the owners had grown frustrated as the county commissioners had yet to render a decision. Despite ongoing attempts to acquire the field, the county failed to secure a $100,000 state grant. However, it was deemed the only appropriate site for an airport and so discussions for its purchase were suggested to continue. (Note: The county eventually selected a different site for its airport.) Less than three months after the rededication of the airport on 4 July 1968, Pier died. By 1974, the airport had a 3,275-foot (998 m) paved runway and a 3,100-foot (940 m) gravel runway.

It was purchased from Pier's widow and daughter by Dominic J. Teramana, Sr. in early June 1984. Nine months later, his son, Dominic Teramana, Jr., approached the county with an offer to sell the airport. After announcing plans to sell a number of properties to raise money, the county purchased the 375-acre (152 ha) Cross Creek Air Park on 16 May 1985. (Note: Teramana, Jr. was one of fifteen directors of a savings and loan sued by the state a few months later as part of a nationwide crisis.) By late June it was known as the Jefferson County Airpark. A 20,000-square-foot (1,900 m^{2}) "spec" building was constructed next to the airport in 1991. This building was leased by Bates Brothers Amusement the following year. An EAA chapter announced it was building a learning center in February 1992. The Jefferson County Regional Airport Authority was established in July.

By mid August 1994, work had started to repave the main runway. To help pay for the construction of at least one hangar, any coal found during the project was to be sold. Two months later, a 1,600-square-foot (150 m^{2}) terminal was under construction. By early April 1995, the airport had been in negotiations with a local resident for nearly two years over obtaining 1.5 to 3.5 acres (0.61 to 1.42 ha) of her land needed for an obstruction free area. An October proposal to build t-hangars was criticized by pilots as requiring rental fees that were too expensive. An expansion of the runway to 3,500 by 60 feet (1,067 m × 18 m) was dedicated on 26 July 1996.

The county purchased 63 acres (25 ha) of land in late May 1998 to add to the industrial park. This was followed by another 167 acres (68 ha) purchase in August to permit the removal of a hill that presented both an obstruction to aircraft and prevented an extension of the runway. However, after the bids for the project were received, the second lowest bidder alleged that the lowest bidder was a non-union business and not qualified for the job. The county then awarded the contract to the former. This meant it had to wait for FAA approval as to whether they would make up the difference. At the end of March, a preliminary injunction was issued to halt work as a result of a lawsuit by the lowest bidder. Approximately a week later, a judge reversed the county's decision. By early July, 35 feet (11 m) of the hill had been excavated, but a decision had yet to be made on moving a road in the way of the extension. The improvements enticed an aircraft painting business that had been located at the Harrison County Airport to move to and remodel a 16,000-square-foot (1,500 m^{2}) hangar at Jefferson the following month. The airport received a federal grant to relocate the road in March 2001. By the end of July 2003, a 7,200-square-foot (670 m^{2}) corporate jet hangar was under construction. A week after a nearby property was purchased in early August, the airpark received a federal grant to build access roads. The presence of an adjacent wetland required the airport to come up with a plan to mitigate its affects before the runway extension project could proceed. By early August 2005, a project to extend the runway to 4,400 feet (1,300 m) was nearing completion.

The new Ralph Freshwater Terminal, named for a former member of the airport authority, was dedicated in June 2009. A new 3,600-square-foot (330 m^{2}) hangar for transient aircraft was almost finished by early October. However, two hangars dating to World War II were destroyed by strong winds a year later. An extension of the runway to 5,000 by 75 feet (1,524 m × 23 m) was dedicated on 9 October 2014.

By late February 2016, the airport authority was attempting to obtain an instrument landing system for the facility.

== Facilities and aircraft ==
The Geary A Bates/Jefferson County Airpark has one runway, designated as runway 14/32. It measures 5001 x 75 ft (1524 x 23 m) and is paved with asphalt.

The airport has a fixed-base operator that sells fuel, both avgas and jet fuel. It offers services such as catering, courtesy cars, and more in addition to amenities such as internet, conference rooms, a crew lounge, showers, and more.

For the 12-month period ending September 27, 2022, the airport had 10,585 aircraft operations, an average of 29 per day. This was 96% general aviation, 2% air taxi, and 1% military. For the same time period, there were 34 aircraft based at the airport: 31 single-engine airplanes, 1 multi-engine airplane, 1 jet, and 1 helicopter.

== Accidents and incidents ==
- On 27 June 1957, a Taylorcraft airplane crashed and burned after striking powerlines while landing at the airport.
- On 31 July 1957, Globe Swift crashed due to engine failure while taking off from the airport, seriously damaging the airplane.
- On October 14, 2000, a Cessna 172 was damaged while landing at the Jefferson County Airport. During the roundout, as the airplane entered ground effect, the left wing suddenly lifted skyward, and the airplane touched down hard on the right main landing gear. The plane was pushed off the runway, and the propeller impacted runway lights. The pilot attempted a go-around, but the plane stalled. The pilot attempted to retract the flaps, and the plane impacted trees. The probable cause of the accident was found to be the pilot's failure to maintain directional control while landing with a crosswind.

== See also ==
- List of airports in Ohio
