= Holmes County Courthouse (Ohio) =

Local government building in the United States

- Holmes County Courthouse And Jail
- U.S. National Register of Historic Places
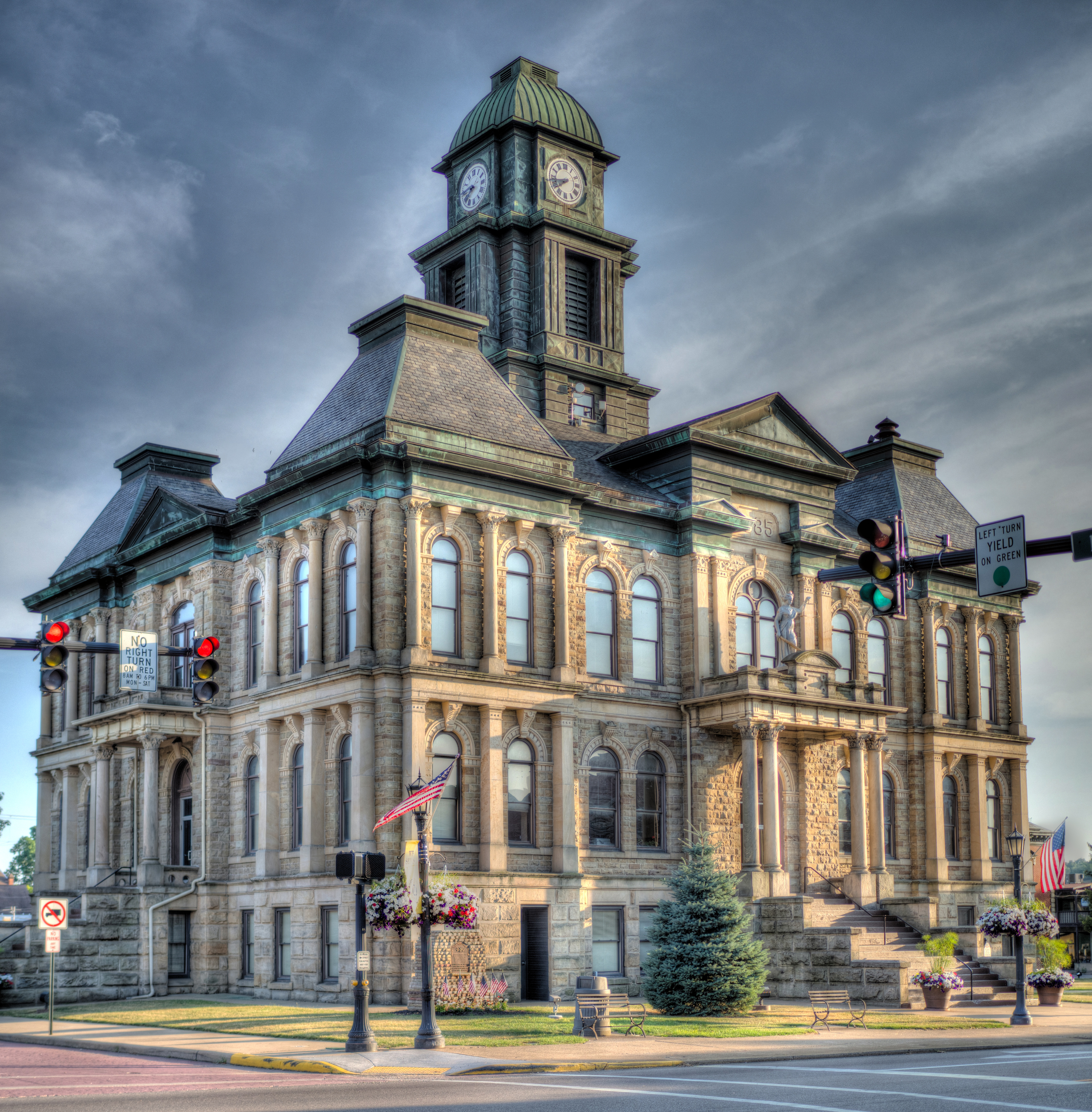
- Courthouse viewed from corner of Monroe and Jackson

- Location within Ohio Location within the United States
- Interactive map showing the location of Holmes County Courthouse
- Location: Courthouse Sq., Millersburg, Ohio
- Coordinates: 40°33′14″N 81°55′2″W
- Area: 2 acres (0.81 ha)
- Built: 1880
- Architect: J.W. Yost; Hibbert and Schaus
- NRHP reference No.: 74001529
- Added to NRHP: July 25, 1974

The Holmes County Courthouse is a historic government building in Millersburg, Ohio, United States. Built in the late nineteenth century, it has been designated a historic site because of its architectural importance.

== Previous courthouses ==
Established by an 1824 law and organized in the following year, Holmes County has possessed three courthouses, all of which have been located at the same site in Millersburg. The first courthouse, built in 1825, lasted only nine years before its destruction by fire. Its replacement lasted approximately fifty years until being destroyed circa 1884 to provide room for the construction of the current building, which began in that year and was completed in 1886.

== Architecture ==
Constructed by Newark builders Hibbert and Schaus according to a design by J.W. Yost, this three-story courthouse comprises such elements as rough stone walls with smooth trim, a colonnaded porch with Ionic columns surrounding the main entrance, and a prominent pediment on the northern side. From its completion until the 1950s, the courthouse featured a statue of Lady Justice located atop the northern pediment, but its deterioration led local officials to place it in storage for many years until area lawyers paid for its restoration. Lesser elements of the building's architecture include steel details, ornamental columns and pilasters closer to the mansard roof, plastered ceilings, a state of Lady Justice in the center of the tiled floor in the building's lobby, and towers on the courthouse's corners. A prominent clock is located in the tower of the courthouse. Today, the Holmes County Courthouse remains the county's center of government. Courtrooms in the building serve as meeting places for the Holmes County Court of Common Pleas, along with other courts. Because of the county's exceptionally large Amish population, the courthouse features a parking area with use restricted to horses and buggies.

== Historic designation ==
Closely related to the courthouse is a jail, located on the lawn next to the courthouse. This Italianate structure is a rectangular brick building with a complex roofline. It predates the current courthouse, having been erected circa 1880. In 1974, the courthouse and jail were together listed on the National Register of Historic Places, qualifying for inclusion because of their historically significant architecture. Ten years later, much of downtown Millersburg was designated a historic district, the Millersburg Historic District, and listed on the National Register; at the core of the district is the area around the courthouse at the junction of Clay and Jackson Streets.

== Historic Events ==
In the spring of 1892, a Black man from Mt. Vernon or Wooster, Ohio, whose name remains unknown, was walking in Holmes County, at the time an all-white county. After he had been in town for a few days, a group of white people decided to lynch him because he “lingered about people’s doorsteps and angered them in various ways.” On April 1, 1892, a mob gathered after nightfall, abducted the man, and hanged him from a tree in the public square in front of the county courthouse.
