= Millersburg, Ohio =

- Village
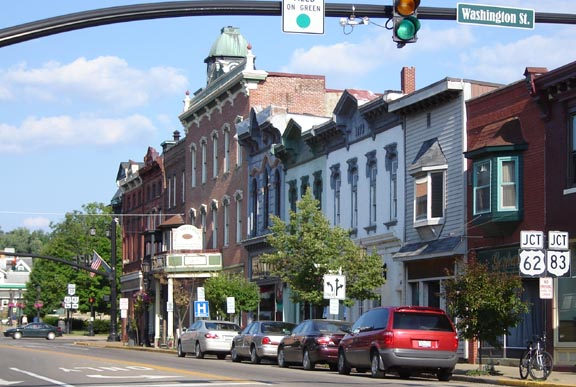
- Downtown Millersburg
- Interactive map of Millersburg, Ohio
- Location within Ohio Location within the United States
- Coordinates: 40°33′18″N 81°55′5″W
- Country: United States
- State: Ohio
- County: Holmes
- Township: Hardy

Government
  - Mayor: Kelly Hoffee
  - Administrator: Nate Troyer

Area
  - Total: 2.54 sq mi (6.59 km^{2})
  - Land: 2.54 sq mi (6.57 km^{2})
  - Water: 0.0077 sq mi (0.02 km^{2})
- Elevation: 899 ft (274 m)

Population (2020)
  - Total: 3,151
  - Density: 1,242.6/sq mi (479.78/km^{2})
- Time zone: UTC-5 (Eastern (EST))
  - Summer (DST): UTC-4 (EDT)
- ZIP code: 44654
- Area code: 330
- FIPS code: 39-50372
- GNIS feature ID: 1057849
- Website: http://www.millersburgohio.com/

Millersburg is a village in Holmes County, Ohio, United States, and its county seat. Located 66 miles (106 km) south of Cleveland, it is in the heart of Ohio's Amish Country and is part of a large regional tourism industry. The population was 3,151 at the 2020 census. Holmes County Airport, located two miles southwest of Millersburg, serves the county.

== History ==
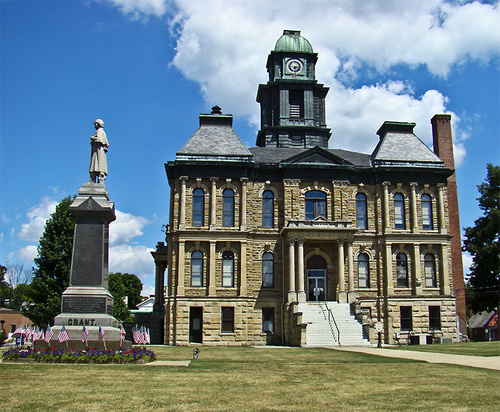
Holmes County Courthouse

The Old Town of Millersburg was laid out by Adam Johnson and Charles Miller of Coshocton County in November 1815. It was located at the north side of the northwest quarter of Section 12, township 9, range 7 adjoining the School Lands, and very near the northwest corner of said quarter section. The Northwest corner, lot 1, was a little over the hill towards the present mill dam and the northeast corner, lot 9, was about 100 steps west of the present Wooster Road. The center of the town was very nearly the center of Walkups Addition. The principal streets were Bridge, High and Market, each four rods wide. The direction of the former was east and west, and ll rods south of the school land; and was located on the State Road east and west through the county, that crosses the Killbuck near the present mill dam.

Thomas Haskins was the first settler on the town plat, settling there in the spring of 1819, on lot 21, corner of Bridge and High streets. In the spring of 1820, James Withrow erected a one-and-a-half-story building on Lot 33 cornering on Bridge and High streets and diagonally across them from the Haskins tavern.

In late 1820 a cabin was erected in the northeast corner of the town for a school house. Joseph Edger of Berlin taught at the school that winter, and it was the first school in the town. During that winter the Rev. Harper, a Presbyterian minister, preached in the school house which was the first sermon delivered in Millersburg. On April 8, 1824, Andrew Johnston and Charles Miller filed a plan for the present town of Millersburg. "New Town" as it was referred to, was situated southeast of the original town of Millersburg (Old Town). The new plan laid out 194 lots. The center of this plan consisted of a block for public use. The main east–west street was named Jackson. To the north of this was Clinton and to the south, Adams. The north–south streets were Mad Anthony, Washington, Clay, Monroe and Crawford with the main intersection being Clay and Jackson. The first two residences in the town were built by James French and William Painter. When Millersburg was accepted as the county seat of the newly formed Holmes County it began to prosper.

In 1833, Millersburg contained ten stores, four taverns, four practicing physicians, three attorneys, one printing office, one meeting house, one apothecary's shop, and 73 dwelling houses.

On April 1, 1892, an unidentified black male was lynched in Millersburg. Papers reported that he was the only black man in the county and had been "annoying people in various ways". The man was found hanged on the courthouse lawn one morning after several people heard noises during the night.

== Geography ==
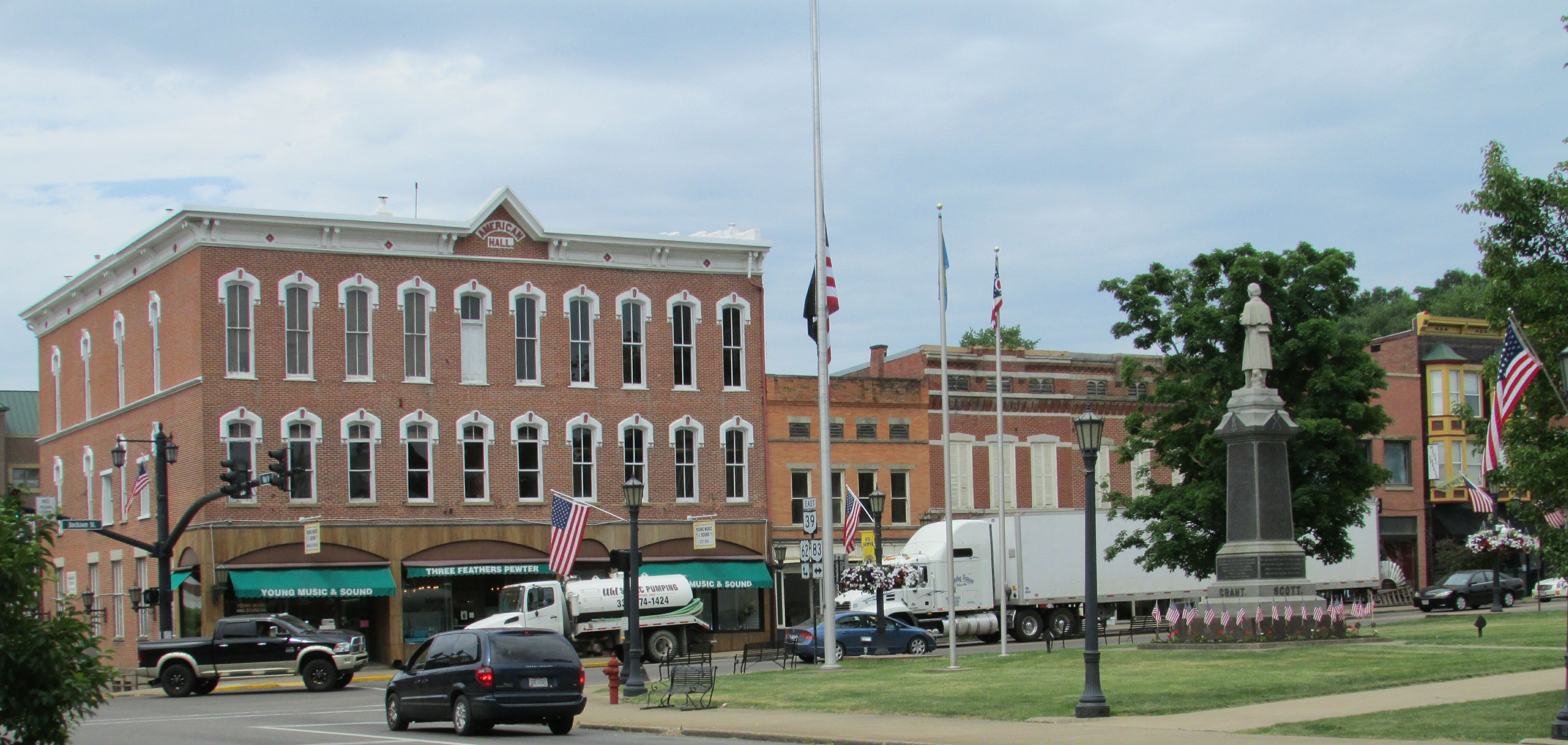
American Hall and Jackson Street

According to the United States Census Bureau, the village has a total area of 2.23 square miles (5.78 km^{2}), of which 2.22 square miles (5.75 km^{2}) is land and 0.01 square miles (0.03 km^{2}) is water.

=== Climate ===
According to the Köppen Climate Classification system, Millersburg has a hot-summer humid continental climate, abbreviated "Dfa" on climate maps. The hottest temperature recorded in Millersburg was 104 °F (40.0 °C) on July 20, 1930, while the coldest temperature recorded was −35 °F (−37.2 °C) on January 20, 1994.

Climate data for Millersburg, Ohio, 1991–2020 normals, extremes 1919–present
| Month | Jan | Feb | Mar | Apr | May | Jun | Jul | Aug | Sep | Oct | Nov | Dec | Year |
|---|---|---|---|---|---|---|---|---|---|---|---|---|---|
| Record high °F (°C) | 70 (21) | 77 (25) | 85 (29) | 92 (33) | 98 (37) | 100 (38) | 104 (40) | 100 (38) | 101 (38) | 90 (32) | 81 (27) | 76 (24) | 104 (40) |
| Mean maximum °F (°C) | 59.8 (15.4) | 62.9 (17.2) | 72.5 (22.5) | 81.6 (27.6) | 87.2 (30.7) | 91.7 (33.2) | 92.1 (33.4) | 91.0 (32.8) | 88.8 (31.6) | 81.5 (27.5) | 71.1 (21.7) | 62.0 (16.7) | 93.2 (34.0) |
| Mean daily maximum °F (°C) | 35.5 (1.9) | 39.0 (3.9) | 48.9 (9.4) | 62.1 (16.7) | 72.0 (22.2) | 80.3 (26.8) | 83.7 (28.7) | 82.3 (27.9) | 76.2 (24.6) | 64.6 (18.1) | 51.6 (10.9) | 40.4 (4.7) | 61.4 (16.3) |
| Daily mean °F (°C) | 26.8 (−2.9) | 29.1 (−1.6) | 37.9 (3.3) | 49.3 (9.6) | 59.5 (15.3) | 68.3 (20.2) | 72.0 (22.2) | 70.4 (21.3) | 63.5 (17.5) | 52.1 (11.2) | 41.1 (5.1) | 32.0 (0.0) | 50.2 (10.1) |
| Mean daily minimum °F (°C) | 18.0 (−7.8) | 19.1 (−7.2) | 26.9 (−2.8) | 36.4 (2.4) | 47.0 (8.3) | 56.3 (13.5) | 60.3 (15.7) | 58.4 (14.7) | 50.7 (10.4) | 39.5 (4.2) | 30.5 (−0.8) | 23.7 (−4.6) | 38.9 (3.8) |
| Mean minimum °F (°C) | −4.7 (−20.4) | 0.7 (−17.4) | 9.1 (−12.7) | 23.0 (−5.0) | 32.0 (0.0) | 42.4 (5.8) | 49.3 (9.6) | 47.9 (8.8) | 38.0 (3.3) | 26.1 (−3.3) | 16.5 (−8.6) | 5.9 (−14.5) | −8.2 (−22.3) |
| Record low °F (°C) | −35 (−37) | −20 (−29) | −11 (−24) | 7 (−14) | 20 (−7) | 28 (−2) | 37 (3) | 35 (2) | 25 (−4) | 14 (−10) | −3 (−19) | −24 (−31) | −35 (−37) |
| Average precipitation inches (mm) | 2.86 (73) | 2.08 (53) | 3.14 (80) | 3.87 (98) | 4.23 (107) | 4.88 (124) | 4.23 (107) | 3.37 (86) | 3.29 (84) | 3.08 (78) | 2.83 (72) | 2.87 (73) | 40.73 (1,035) |
| Average snowfall inches (cm) | 7.3 (19) | 4.8 (12) | 2.9 (7.4) | 0.2 (0.51) | 0.0 (0.0) | 0.0 (0.0) | 0.0 (0.0) | 0.0 (0.0) | 0.0 (0.0) | 0.0 (0.0) | 0.7 (1.8) | 4.2 (11) | 20.1 (51.71) |
| Average precipitation days (≥ 0.01 in) | 11.0 | 9.0 | 10.3 | 11.7 | 13.0 | 11.5 | 10.6 | 8.8 | 8.4 | 10.3 | 9.3 | 10.4 | 124.3 |
| Average snowy days (≥ 0.1 in) | 4.5 | 3.3 | 1.5 | 0.1 | 0.0 | 0.0 | 0.0 | 0.0 | 0.0 | 0.0 | 0.6 | 3.0 | 13.0 |
Source 1: NOAA
Source 2: National Weather Service

== Demographics ==
Historical population
| Census | Pop. | Note | %± |
|---|---|---|---|
| 1830 | 320 | | — |
| 1850 | 837 | | — |
| 1860 | 1,156 | | 38.1% |
| 1870 | 1,457 | | 26.0% |
| 1880 | 1,814 | | 24.5% |
| 1890 | 1,923 | | 6.0% |
| 1900 | 1,998 | | 3.9% |
| 1910 | 2,020 | | 1.1% |
| 1920 | 2,098 | | 3.9% |
| 1930 | 3,114 | | 48.4% |
| 1940 | 3,152 | | 1.2% |
| 1950 | 3,397 | | 7.8% |
| 1960 | 3,101 | | −8.7% |
| 1970 | 2,979 | | −3.9% |
| 1980 | 3,247 | | 9.0% |
| 1990 | 3,051 | | −6.0% |
| 2000 | 3,326 | | 9.0% |
| 2010 | 3,025 | | −9.0% |
| 2020 | 3,151 | | 4.2% |

=== 2020 census ===
As of the 2020 census, Millersburg had a population of 3,151. The median age was 40.5 years. 20.5% of residents were under the age of 18 and 19.9% of residents were 65 years of age or older. For every 100 females there were 87.8 males, and for every 100 females age 18 and over there were 86.8 males age 18 and over.

0.0% of residents lived in urban areas, while 100.0% lived in rural areas.

There were 1,392 households in Millersburg, of which 25.4% had children under the age of 18 living in them. Of all households, 37.3% were married-couple households, 20.0% were households with a male householder and no spouse or partner present, and 35.5% were households with a female householder and no spouse or partner present. About 36.9% of all households were made up of individuals and 15.9% had someone living alone who was 65 years of age or older.

There were 1,494 housing units, of which 6.8% were vacant. The homeowner vacancy rate was 0.3% and the rental vacancy rate was 6.9%.

Racial composition as of the 2020 census
| Race | Number | Percent |
|---|---|---|
| White | 2,949 | 93.6% |
| Black or African American | 18 | 0.6% |
| American Indian and Alaska Native | 8 | 0.3% |
| Asian | 24 | 0.8% |
| Native Hawaiian and Other Pacific Islander | 0 | 0.0% |
| Some other race | 33 | 1.0% |
| Two or more races | 119 | 3.8% |
| Hispanic or Latino (of any race) | 85 | 2.7% |

=== 2010 census ===
As of the census of 2010, there were 3,025 people, 1,228 households, and 759 families living in the village. The population density was 1,362.6 inhabitants per square mile (526.1/km^{2}). There were 1,360 housing units at an average density of 612.6 per square mile (236.5/km^{2}). The racial makeup of the village was 96.3% White, 0.6% African American, 0.2% Native American, 0.3% Asian, 0.1% Pacific Islander, 1.3% from other races, and 1.3% from two or more races. Hispanic or Latino of any race were 2.6% of the population.

There were 1,228 households, of which 32.7% had children under the age of 18 living with them, 42.5% were married couples living together, 14.5% had a female householder with no husband present, 4.8% had a male householder with no wife present, and 38.2% were non-families. 32.4% of all households were made up of individuals, and 11.8% had someone living alone who was 65 years of age or older. The average household size was 2.38 and the average family size was 3.00.

The median age in the village was 37.7 years. 24% of residents were under the age of 18; 10% were between the ages of 18 and 24; 24.9% were from 25 to 44; 25.9% were from 45 to 64; and 15.1% were 65 years of age or older. The gender makeup of the village was 46.3% male and 53.7% female.

=== 2000 census ===
As of the census of 2000, there were 3,326 people, 1,213 households, and 771 families living in the village. The population density was 1,649.0 inhabitants per square mile (636.7/km^{2}). There were 1,360 housing units at an average density of 674.3 per square mile (260.3/km^{2}). The racial makeup of the village was 96.87% White, 1.47% African American, 0.09% Asian, 0.03% Pacific Islander, 0.54% from other races, and 0.99% from two or more races. Hispanic or Latino of any race were 2.01% of the population.

There were 1,213 households, out of which 32.6% had children under the age of 18 living with them, 47.1% were married couples living together, 12.5% had a female householder with no husband present, and 36.4% were non-families. 30.8% of all households were made up of individuals, and 13.1% had someone living alone who was 65 years of age or older. The average household size was 2.43 and the average family size was 3.05.

In the village, the population was spread out, with 24.8% under the age of 18, 9.6% from 18 to 24, 26.9% from 25 to 44, 20.0% from 45 to 64, and 18.8% who were 65 years of age or older. The median age was 37 years. For every 100 females there were 93.8 males. For every 100 females age 18 and over, there were 90.8 males.

The median income for a household in the village was $33,809, and the median income for a family was $39,333. Males had a median income of $26,852 versus $20,472 for females. The per capita income for the village was $15,021. About 9.6% of families and 12.2% of the population were below the poverty line, including 17.9% of those under age 18 and 4.1% of those age 65 or over.

== Education ==
West Holmes Local School District operates West Holmes High School in the village.

Millersburg has a public library, a branch of the Holmes County District Public Library.

== Infrastructure ==
=== Transportation ===
The Holmes County Airport is located two nautical miles (2.3 mi; 3.7 km) west-southwest of Millersburg's central business district.

== See also ==
- Holmes County Courthouse
- National Register of Historic Places listings in Holmes County, Ohio
