= Friendship Park (Ohio) =

Public park near Smithfield, Ohio

- Location within Ohio
- Nearest city: Smithfield, Ohio
- Coordinates: 40.290°N 80.778°W
- Area: 1,320 acres (530 ha)
- Website: friendship.jeffersoncountyoh.com

Friendship Park is a public park near Smithfield, Ohio.

== History ==
The park authority was disbanded in early October 1970 due to criticism that it was being insufficiently proactive. The park was established on land donated by the Consolidated Coal Company in August 1972. An earthen dam was completed the same month.

=== Former airport ===
The Jefferson County Airport (FAA LID: ~~44D~~) was a public use airport located near Smithfield, Ohio.

The county initially attempted to obtain one of the $100,000 airport grants from the state, but failed when it did not secure a site before funds ran out in late June 1967. Nevertheless, by the middle of the next month a bill was introduced in the Ohio General Assembly to reinitiate the grant.

The site, 12th on a list of possible locations, was selected in late August 1968 due to an impending deadline for the grant. An approximately 113-acre (46 ha) deed for an airstrip was given to the county in mid September 1968. By one month later, the grant had been awarded. However, in mid October 1969, the FAA threatened to cancel funding for the airport due the county going ahead with site selection and planning. Relations improved after the county commissioners explained that they were forced to move ahead with the project due to a deadline for the state grant. The majority of grading for the 3,500-by-65-foot (1,067 m × 20 m) runway had been completed by mid September 1970. A strike by coal miners in October 1971 prevented supplies necessary for work on the runway base from being transported to the site. Paving of the runway was ready to begin in late September 1972 and completed the following week. The airport was opened in October 1972. The county received two checks totaling approximately $35,000 in mid January 1973.

The airport was dedicated on 14 September 1975. The bids for the construction of a terminal building were at least twice rejected and re-advertised before a contract was awarded in late October 1976. The facility was officially named the Jefferson County Airport in early May 1977. In mid April 1978, after a year of trying, the airport was finally able to obtain fuel. At the same time, a flight school had expressed interest in using the airport.

By 1985, the airport was severely underutilized due to its remote location. A few months after a proposal in late February, guardrails had been installed and the airport converted into a dragstrip.

== Facilities ==
The Jefferson County Fairgrounds are located at the park.

The park has two RV campgrounds.
