= 2009 Big East women's basketball tournament =

The 2009 Big East women's basketball tournament took place in March 2009 at the XL Center in Hartford, Connecticut. The Connecticut Huskies defeated the Louisville Cardinals 75–36 in the tournament finals to receive the Big East Conference's automatic bid to the 2009 NCAA tournament. This was the first Big East tournament to include all 16 of the conference's teams. The teams finishing 9 through 16 in the regular season standings played first-round games, while teams 5 through 8 received byes to the second round. The top 4 teams during the regular season received double-byes to the quarterfinals.

== Bracket ==
First round Friday, March 6
12	Syracuse	61
13	St. John's	63
9	Marquette	54
16	Cincinnati	60^{OT}

Second round Saturday, March 7
13	St. John's	45
5	Notre Dame	62
16	Cincinnati	58
8	South Florida	68

Quarterfinals; Sunday, March 8
5	Notre Dame	47
4	Villanova	58
8	South Florida	42
1	Connecticut	79

Semifinals; Monday, March 9
4	Villanova	42
1	Connecticut	72

First round Friday, March 6
10	Georgetown	45
15	Seton Hall	70
11	West Virginia	53
14	Providence	48

Second round Saturday, March 7
15	Seton Hall	45
7	Rutgers	79
11	West Virginia	72
6	DePaul	75^{OT}

Quarterfinals; Sunday, March 8
7	Rutgers	82
2	Louisville	87
6	DePaul	59
3	Pittsburgh	62

Semifinals; Monday, March 9
2	Louisville	69
3	Pittsburgh	63

=== Championship Game ===
Big East tournament Final; Saturday, March 14
1	Connecticut	75
2	Louisville	36
