= South Florida Bulls men's basketball statistical leaders =

The South Florida Bulls men's basketball statistical leaders are individual statistical leaders of the South Florida Bulls men's basketball program in various categories, including points, assists, blocks, rebounds, and steals. Within those areas, the lists identify single-game, single-season, and career leaders. The Bulls represent the University of South Florida in the NCAA's American Athletic Conference.

South Florida began competing in intercollegiate basketball in 1971. The NCAA did not officially record assists as a stat until the 1983–84 season, and blocks and steals until the 1985–86 season, but South Florida's record books includes players in these stats before these seasons. These lists are updated through the end of the 2020–21 season.

== Scoring ==
Career
Rk	Player	Points	Seasons
1	Charlie Bradley	2,319	1981–82 1982–83 1983–84 1984–85
2	Altron Jackson	2,017	1998–99 1999–00 2000–01 2001–02
3	Radenko Dobras	1,935	1988–89 1989–90 1990–91 1991–92
4	B.B. Waldon	1,869	1998–99 1999–00 2000–01 2001–02
5	Dominique Jones	1,797	2007–08 2008–09 2009–10
6	Chucky Atkins	1,619	1992–93 1993–94 1994–95 1995–96
7	David Collins	1,540	2017–18 2018–19 2019–20 2020–21
8	Tony Grier	1,475	1979–80 1980–81 1981–82
9	Gary Alexander	1,272	1988–89 1989–90 1990–91 1991–92
10	Hakim Shahid	1,252	1986–87 1987–88 1988–89 1989–90

Season
Rk	Player	Points	Season
1	Charlie Bradley	901	1982–83
2	Dominique Jones	705	2009–10
3	Charlie Bradley	652	1984–85
4	Charlie Bradley	625	1983–84
5	Altron Jackson	616	2001–02
6	David Collins	587	2018–19
	Altron Jackson	587	2000–01
8	Altron Jackson	565	1999–00
9	Dominique Jones	561	2008–09
10	Tony Grier	558	1980–81

Single game
Rk	Player	Points	Season	Opponent
1	Dominique Jones	46	2009–10	Providence
2	Charlie Bradley	42	1982–83	Florida State
3	Charlie Bradley	38	1983–84	Florida
4	Dominique Jones	37	2009–10	Pittsburgh
	B.B. Waldon	37	2001–02	TCU
	Charlie Bradley	37	1982–83	Penn State
7	Wes Enis	36	2025–26	UAB
	Dominique Jones	36	2008–09	Iona
	Chucky Atkins	36	1995–96	UCF
	Charlie Bradley	36	1983–84	Monmouth
	Charlie Bradley	36	1982–83	WKU
	Charlie Bradley	36	1982–83	Samford
	Doug Aplin	36	1974–75	UCF

== Rebounds ==
Career
Rk	Player	Rebounds	Seasons
1	B.B. Waldon	928	1998–99 1999–00 2000–01 2001–02
2	Hakim Shahid	893	1986–87 1987–88 1988–89 1989–90
3	Gary Alexander	862	1988–89 1989–90 1990–91 1991–92
4	Curtis Kitchen	816	1982–83 1983–84 1984–85 1985–86
5	Donzel Rush	724	1992–93 1993–94 1994–95 1995–96
6	Willie Redden	720	1978–79 1979–80 1980–81 1981–82
7	Terrence Leather	695	2000–01 2001–02 2002–03 2003–04 2004–05
8	Jim Grandholm	678	1981–82 1982–83 1983–84
9	Toarlyn Fitzpatrick	672	2009–10 2010–11 2011–12 2012–13
10	Jesse Salters	668	1992–93 1993–94 1994–95

Season
Rk	Player	Rebounds	Season
1	Hakim Shahid	383	1989–90
2	Alexis Yetna	346	2018–19
3	Izaiyah Nelson	326	2025–26
4	Kentrell Gransberry	325	2007–08
5	Gary Alexander	315	1991–92
6	Gary Alexander	307	1990–91
7	Darrell Coleman	302	1987–88
	Hakim Shahid	302	1988–89
9	Jim Grandholm	295	1982–83
10	James Harper	291	1995–96
	B.B. Waldon	291	2001–02

Single game
Rk	Player	Rebounds	Season	Opponent
1	Fred Gibbs	26	1972–73	West Florida
2	Hakim Shahid	25	1989–90	Jacksonville
3	Darrell Coleman	24	1987–88	Miami
4	Gary Alexander	23	1991–92	Northeastern Illinois
	Kentrell Gransberry	23	2006–07	DePaul
6	Fred Lewis	22	1991–92	Stetson
7	Hugh Robertson	21	2011–12	Florida A&M
	Fred Gibbs	21	1971–72	UCF
9	Ike Robinson	20	1971–72	Alabama
	Fred Gibbs	20	1971–72	Baldwin-Wallace
	Kenny Brantley	20	1987–88	VCU
	Gary Alexander	20	1991–92	Charlotte

== Assists ==
Career
Rk	Player	Assists	Seasons
1	Reggie Kohn	632	1999–00 2000–01 2001–02 2002–03
2	Anthony Collins	569	2011–12 2012–13 2013–14 2014–15
3	Radenko Dobras	534	1988–89 1989–90 1990–91 1991–92
4	Chucky Atkins	519	1992–93 1993–94 1994–95 1995–96
5	Chris Howard	487	2006–07 2007–08 2008–09 2009–10
6	Tommy Tonelli	480	1982–83 1983–84 1984–85 1985–86
7	Brian Swift	389	2001–02 2002–03 2003–04 2004–05
8	Cedric Smith	384	1997–98 1998–99 1999–00 2000–01
9	Arthur Caldwell	368	1984–85 1985–86 1986–87 1987–88
10	Penny Greene	364	1974–75 1975–76 1976–77 1978–79

Season
Rk	Player	Assists	Season
1	Reggie Kohn	220	2001–02
2	Chucky Atkins	196	1994–95
	Arthur Caldwell	196	1986–87
4	Anthony Collins	194	2012–13
5	Laquincy Rideau	189	2018–19
6	Reggie Kohn	180	2002–03
7	Tommy Tonelli	179	1984–85
8	Lewis Card	170	1982–83
9	Anthony Collins	167	2014–15
10	Anthony Collins	161	2011–12
	Brian Swift	161	2004–05

Single game
Rk	Player	Assists	Season	Opponent
1	Joe Coffey	18	1977–78	Bowling Green
2	Leon Smith	15	1974–75	Florida Southern
	Penny Greene	15	1975–76	South Carolina
	Vince Reynolds	15	1980–81	Georgia State
5	Reggie Kohn	14	2001–02	TCU
6	Bill Lear	13	1971–72	Florida A&M
	Joe Coffey	13	1977–78	Charlotte

== Steals ==
Career
Rk	Player	Steals	Seasons
1	Cedric Smith	231	1997–98 1998–99 1999–00 2000–01
2	B.B. Waldon	215	1998–99 1999–00 2000–01 2001–02
3	Reggie Kohn	193	1999–00 2000–01 2001–02 2002–03
4	David Collins	186	2017–18 2018–19 2019–20 2020–21
5	Altron Jackson	181	1998–99 1999–00 2000–01 2001–02
6	Laquincy Rideau	178	2018–19 2019–20
7	Brian Lamb	158	1994–95 1995–96 1996–97 1997–98
8	Radenko Dobras	152	1988–89 1989–90 1990–91 1991–92
9	Dominique Jones	144	2007–08 2008–09 2009–10
10	Fred Lewis	139	1989–90 1990–91 1991–92

Season
Rk	Player	Steals	Season
1	Laquincy Rideau	101	2018–19
2	Laquincy Rideau	77	2019–20
3	David Collins	76	2018–19
4	Leon Smith	68	1973–74
5	B.B. Waldon	64	2001–02
6	Cedric Smith	61	1998–99
7	Cedric Smith	60	2000–01
	Reggie Kohn	60	2002–03
9	Joseph Pinion	59	2025–26
10	Shaddrick Jenkins	58	1997–98
	Doug Aplin	58	1975–76

Single game
Rk	Player	Steals	Season	Opponent
1	Laquincy Rideau	10	2018–19	Temple
	Altron Jackson	10	2001–02	Florida State
3	Leon Smith	8	1973–74	Florida A&M
	Radenko Dobras	8	1988–89	DePaul
5	Laquincy Rideau	7	2019–20	IUPUI
	David Collins	7	2019–20	Boston College
	David Collins	7	2018–19	Stony Brook
	Izaiyah Nelson	7	2025–26	Wichita State
	Derrick Sharp	7	1992–93	Nicholls State
	Sam Sanders	7	1999–00	Florida Atlantic
	B.B. Waldon	7	1999–00	Houston
	B.B. Waldon	7	2001–02	Illinois-Chicago

== Blocks ==
Career
Rk	Player	Blocks	Seasons
1	Gerrick Morris	263	2000–01 2001–02 2002–03 2003–04
2	Curtis Kitchen	257	1982–83 1983–84 1984–85 1985–86
3	McHugh Mattis	171	2005–06 2006–07
4	Willie Redden	155	1978–79 1979–80 1980–81 1981–82
5	Solomon Jones	154	2004–05 2005–06
6	Ruben Guerrero	121	2014–15 2015–16 2016–17
7	Toarlyn Fitzpatrick	112	2009–10 2010–11 2011–12 2012–13
8	Augustus Gilchrist	102	2008–09 2009–10 2010–11 2011–12
9	Doug Wallace	96	1983–84 1984–85 1985–86 1986–87

Season
Rk	Player	Blocks	Season
1	McHugh Mattis	109	2006–07
2	Gerrick Morris	108	2003–04
3	Solomon Jones	90	2005–06
4	Curtis Kitchen	89	1985–86
5	Gerrick Morris	75	2000–01
6	Curtis Kitchen	72	1984–85
7	Solomon Jones	64	2004–05
8	McHugh Mattis	62	2005–06
9	Jaleel Cousins	52	2015–16
10	Willie Redden	50	1978–79

Single game
Rk	Player	Blocks	Season	Opponent
1	Gerrick Morris	11	2000–01	George Washington
2	Curtis Kitchen	10	1985–86	Charlotte
	Gerrick Morris	10	2003–04	Wright State
	Gerrick Morris	10	2003–04	Houston
	McHugh Mattis	10	2006–07	Winston-Salem State
6	Gerrick Morris	9	2002–03	TCU
	Gerrick Morris	9	2003–04	Southern Miss
8	Curtis Kitchen	8	1984–85	Wake Forest
	Gerrick Morris	8	2001–02	Pittsburgh
	Gerrick Morris	8	2001–02	Prairie View A&M
