= 2019–20 South Florida Bulls men's basketball team =

American college basketball season

2019–20 South Florida Bulls men's basketball
- Conference: American Athletic Conference
- Record: 14–17 (7–11 AAC)
- Head coach: Brian Gregory (3rd season)
- Assistant coaches: Tom Herrion; Scott Wagers; Larry Dixon
- Home arena: Yuengling Center

2019–20 American Athletic Conference men's basketball standings
	Conf.				Overall
Team	W		L	PCT	W		L	PCT
Cincinnati	13	–	5	.722	20	–	10	.667
No. 22 Houston	13	–	5	.722	23	–	8	.742
Tulsa	13	–	5	.722	21	–	10	.677
Wichita State	11	–	7	.611	23	–	8	.742
UConn	10	–	8	.556	19	–	12	.613
Memphis	10	–	8	.556	21	–	10	.677
SMU	9	–	9	.500	19	–	11	.633
UCF	7	–	11	.389	16	–	14	.533
South Florida	7	–	11	.389	14	–	17	.452
Temple	6	–	12	.333	14	–	17	.452
East Carolina	5	–	13	.278	11	–	20	.355
Tulane	4	–	14	.222	12	–	18	.400
Note: The 2020 AAC tournament was canceled due to the COVID-19 pandemic. Rankings from AP poll

The 2019–20 South Florida Bulls men's basketball team represented the University of South Florida during the 2019–20 NCAA Division I men's basketball season. The season marked the 48th basketball season for USF, the seventh as a member of the American Athletic Conference, and the third season under head coach Brian Gregory. The Bulls played their home games at Yuengling Center on the university's Tampa, Florida campus.

== Previous season ==
The Bulls finished the 2018–19 season 24–14, 8–10 in AAC play to finish in a tie for seventh place. As the No. 8 seed in the AAC tournament, they lost in the first round to Connecticut. They were invited to participate in the College Basketball Invitational where they defeated Stony Brook, Utah Valley, and Loyola Marymount to advance to the best-of-three finals series against DePaul. After losing in game 1, they won games 2 and 3 to become CBI champions.

== Offseason ==
=== Departures ===
Name	Number	Pos.	Height	Weight	Year	Hometown	Reason for departure
Ron Lubin	14	G	5'10"	165	Senior	Fort Lauderdale, FL	Walk-on; graduated
Mayan Kiir	20	F	6'9"	228	RS Sophomore	Bradenton, FL	Left team; transferred to New Mexico State.
T. J. Lang	23	G	6'7'	208	RS Senior	Mobile, AL	Graduated
Nikola Scekic	41	C	7'2"	255	Senior	Belgrade, Serbia	Graduated

=== 2019 recruiting class ===
College recruiting information
Name	Hometown	School	Height	Weight	Commit date
B.J. Mack; C	Charlotte, NC	Oak Hill Academy	6 ft 8 in (2.03 m)	250 lb (110 kg)	Sep 11, 2018
B.J. Mack; C	Recruit ratings: Scout: Rivals: 247Sports: (78)				
Jamir Chaplin; SG	Stone Mountain, GA	Meadowcreek High School	6 ft 4 in (1.93 m)	190 lb (86 kg)	
Jamir Chaplin; SG	Recruit ratings: Scout: Rivals: 247Sports: (NR)				
Overall recruit ranking:
Note: In many cases, Scout, Rivals, 247Sports, On3, and ESPN may conflict in their listings of height and weight.; In these cases, the average was taken. ESPN grades are on a 100-point scale.; Sources: "2019 Team Ranking". Rivals.

=== 2020 recruiting class ===
College recruiting information (2020)
Name	Hometown	School	Height	Weight	Commit date
Caleb Murphy; SG	Loganville, GA	Grayson High School	6 ft 8 in (2.03 m)	250 lb (110 kg)	Sep 1, 2019
Caleb Murphy; SG	Recruit ratings: Scout: Rivals: 247Sports: (80)				
Overall recruit ranking:
Note: In many cases, Scout, Rivals, 247Sports, On3, and ESPN may conflict in their listings of height and weight.; In these cases, the average was taken. ESPN grades are on a 100-point scale.; Sources: "2020 Team Ranking". Rivals.

== Roster ==
2019–20 South Florida Bulls men's basketball team
Players
Coaches

Pos.	#	Name	Height	Weight	Year	Previous school	Hometown
G	0	David Collins	6 ft 4 in (1.93 m)	218 lb (99 kg)	Jr	First Love Christian Academy	Youngstown, Ohio
G	1	Xavier Castaneda	6 ft 1 in (1.85 m)	188 lb (85 kg)	So	Whitney High School	Chicago, Illinois
G	2	Zack Dawson	6 ft 3 in (1.91 m)	200 lb (91 kg)	RS So	Oklahoma State	Miami, Florida
G	3	Laquincy Rideau	6 ft 1 in (1.85 m)	205 lb (93 kg)	RS Sr	Gardner–Webb	West Palm Beach, Florida
F	4	Michael Durr	7 ft 0 in (2.13 m)	250 lb (113 kg)	So	Victory Rock Prep	Bradenton, Florida
F	5	Rashun Williams	6 ft 6 in (1.98 m)	222 lb (101 kg)	So	Calhoun County High School	Edison, Georgia
F	10	Alexis Yetna (injured)	6 ft 8 in (2.03 m)	234 lb (106 kg)	RS So	Putnam Science Academy	Paris, France
G	11	Mark Calleja (W)	6 ft 2 in (1.88 m)	190 lb (86 kg)	So	Hudson High School	Hudson, Florida
G/F	13	Justin Brown	6 ft 6 in (1.98 m)	218 lb (99 kg)	Jr	Hargrave Military Academy	Birmingham, Alabama
F	22	Madut Akec	6 ft 6 in (1.98 m)	208 lb (94 kg)	RS Fr	Victory Rock Prep	Bradenton, Florida
G	24	Jamir Chaplin	6 ft 5 in (1.96 m)	197 lb (89 kg)	Fr	Meadowcreek High School	Norcross, Georgia
F	33	B. J. Mack	6 ft 8 in (2.03 m)	261 lb (118 kg)	Fr	Oak Hill Academy	Charlotte, North Carolina
F	34	Antun Maricevic	6 ft 10 in (2.08 m)	260 lb (118 kg)	Sr	Casper College	Zagreb, Croatia

Head coach

- Brian Gregory (Oakland)

Assistant coach(es)

- Tom Herrion (Merrimack)
- Scott Wagers (Tennessee Wesleyan)
- Larry Dixon (Johnson C. Smith)

Legend

- (C) Team captain
- (S) Suspended
- (I) Ineligible
- (W) Walk-on
- Injured
- Current redshirt

Roster

- Nov 4, 2019 - Alexis Yetna suffered a knee injury, leading him to sit out for the entire season.

== Schedule and results ==
Date time, TV	Rank^{#}	Opponent^{#}	Result	Record	Site (attendance) city, state
Exhibition
October 29, 2019*; 7:00 pm		Saint Leo	W 76–62		Yuengling Center (2,198); Tampa, FL
Non-Conference regular season
November 5, 2019*; 8:00 pm, ESPN3		Arkansas–Pine Bluff	W 70–41	1–0	Yuengling Center (4,495); Tampa, FL
November 10, 2019*; 12:00 pm, CBSSN		Boston College	L 60–74	1–1	Yuengling Center (3,191); Tampa, FL
November 13, 2019*; 7:00 pm, ESPN3		IUPUI; Cayman Islands Classic campus site game	L 53–70	1–2	Yuengling Center (2,474); Tampa, FL
November 21, 2019*; 7:00 pm, ESPN3		Wofford	W 69–55	2–2	Yuengling Center (2,912); Tampa, FL
November 25, 2019*; 1:30 pm, FloSports		vs. Loyola–Chicago; Cayman Islands Classic quarterfinals	W 66–55	3–2	John Gray Gymnasium (1,214); George Town, Cayman Islands
November 26, 2019*; 3:30 pm, FloSports		vs. New Mexico State; Cayman Islands Classic semifinals	L 45–65	3–3	John Gray Gymnasium (755); George Town, Cayman Islands
November 27, 2019*; 6:00 pm, FloSports		vs. Nebraska; Cayman Islands Classic 3rd place game	L 67–74	3–4	John Gray Gymnasium (512); George Town, Cayman Islands
December 2, 2019*; 7:00 pm, ESPN3		Furman	W 65–55	4–4	Yuengling Center (2,444); Tampa, FL
December 6, 2019*; 8:00 pm, ESPN3		Dartmouth	W 63–44	5–4	Yuengling Center (4,732); Tampa, FL
December 15, 2019*; 4:00 pm, ESPN3		Drexel	W 81–61	6–4	Yuengling Center (4,480); Tampa, FL
December 18, 2019*; 7:45 pm, ESPN3		vs. Utah State; Battleground 2K19	L 74–76 ^{OT}	6–5	Toyota Center; Houston, TX
December 21, 2019*; 12:00 pm, FS2		vs. No. 19 Florida State; Orange Bowl Basketball Classic	L 60–66	6–6	BB&T Center (8,927); Sunrise, FL
December 29, 2019*; 5:00 pm, ESPN3		Florida Atlantic	W 60–58	7–6	Yuengling Center (2,707); Tampa, FL
AAC Regular Season
January 1, 2020; 5:00 pm, ESPNU		at SMU	L 64–82	7–7 (0–1)	Moody Coliseum (3,980); Dallas, TX
January 4, 2020; 2:00 pm, ESPNU		Connecticut	W 75–60	8–7 (1–1)	Yuengling Center (4,694); Tampa, FL
January 7, 2020; 7:00 pm, ESPN3		at East Carolina	L 59–62	8–8 (1–2)	Williams Arena (3,389); Greenville, NC
January 12, 2020; 4:00 pm, ESPN2		No. 21 Memphis	L 64–68	8–9 (1–3)	Yuengling Center (5,209); Tampa, FL
January 18, 2020; 6:00 pm, ESPNU		at UCF; War on I-4	L 54–55	8–10 (1–4)	Addition Financial Arena (6,433); Orlando, FL
January 21, 2020; 7:00 pm, ESPNews		Wichita State	L 43–56	8–11 (1–5)	Yuengling Center (3,304); Tampa, FL
January 26, 2020; 2:00 pm, CBSSN		at No. 25 Houston	L 49–68	8–12 (1–6)	Fertitta Center (6,364); Houston, TX
January 29, 2020; 8:00 pm, ESPN3		at Tulane	W 66–52	9–12 (2–6)	Devlin Fieldhouse (1,945); New Orleans, LA
February 1, 2020; 4:00 pm, ESPNU		UCF; War on I-4	W 64–48	10–12 (3–6)	Yuengling Center (6,254); Tampa, FL
February 8, 2020; 4:00 pm, CBSSN		at Memphis	W 75–73	11–12 (4–6)	FedExForum (17,314); Memphis, TN
February 12, 2020; 9:00 pm, ESPNU		No. 20 Houston	L 58–62	11–13 (4–7)	Yuengling Center (4,548); Tampa, FL
February 15, 2020; 12:00 pm, ESPNU		Tulsa	L 48–56	11–14 (4–8)	Yuengling Center (3,095); Tampa, FL
January 20, 2020; 7:00 pm, CBSSN		at Wichita State	L 55–65	11–15 (4–9)	Charles Koch Arena (10,098); Wichita, KS
February 23, 2020; 2:00 pm, CBSSN		at Connecticut	L 71–78	11–16 (4–10)	Harry A. Gampel Pavilion (9,524); Storrs, CT
February 26, 2020; 7:00 pm, ESPN3		East Carolina	W 73–68 ^{OT}	12–16 (5–10)	Yuengling Center (2,692); Tampa, FL
March 1, 2020; 12:00 pm, CBSSN		at Temple	W 64–58	13–16 (6–10)	Liacouras Center (6,656); Philadelphia, PA
March 3, 2020; 7:00 pm, ESPNU		Cincinnati	L 67–79	13–17 (6–11)	Yuengling Center (3,008); Tampa, FL
March 7, 2020; 7:00 pm, ESPN3		SMU	W 61–60	14–17 (7–11)	Yuengling Center (3,587); Tampa, FL
AAC tournament
March 12, 2020; 1:00 pm, ESPNU	(9)	vs. (8) UCF; First Round	Cancelled		Dickies Arena; Fort Worth, TX
*Non-conference game. ^{#}Rankings from AP Poll. (#) Tournament seedings in parentheses. All times are in Eastern Time.

1. Cancelled due to the Coronavirus Pandemic
