= South Florida Bulls men's basketball =

American college basketball team

2026–27 South Florida Bulls men's basketball team
- University: University of South Florida
- First season: 1971–72; 55 years ago
- Athletic director: Rob Higgins
- Head coach: Chris Mack (1st season)
- Location: Tampa, Florida
- Arena: Yuengling Center (capacity: 10,411)
- Conference: The American
- Nickname: Bulls
- Colors: Green and gold
- Student section: So Flo Rodeo
- All-time record: 753–898 (.456)

NCAA Division I tournament round of 32
- 2012

NCAA Division I tournament appearances
- 1990, 1992, 2012, 2026

Conference tournament champions
- Sun Belt: 1990; American: 2026

Conference regular-season champions
- American: 2024, 2026

Uniforms
Home	Away	Alternate

The South Florida Bulls men's basketball team represents the University of South Florida in NCAA Division I basketball competition, where they are currently a member of the American Conference. Chris Mack is the current head coach in his first season leading the program. The Bulls play their home games at the 10,500 seat Yuengling Center on USF's campus in Tampa, Florida. The Bulls have appeared four times in the NCAA Division I men's basketball tournament, most recently in 2026, and won four combined regular season and tournament conference championships.

== History ==
=== Testing (1970–71) ===
Before men's basketball became an official sport at USF, Athletic Director Dick Bowers and President John S. Allen approved of a freshman only squad to test the feasibility of bringing men's basketball to the University of South Florida. They played against freshman teams from other universities in the state as well as junior colleges. The team was a roaring success and won in their first game on December 4, 1970, against the University of Florida. The 1970–71 team finished with a 19–4 record and their popularity led to the approval of the varsity team. The 1970 USF basketball team is not listed the team media guide and 1971 is listed as the official founding of USF basketball, but this team was an integral part in helping the team that exists today come to be.

=== Early years (1971–1980) ===
The University of South Florida's official basketball team first tipped off as the Golden Brahmans on December 1, 1971, with a 74–73 win at Stetson University. The Brahmans played their first season as a member of the NCAA College Division (now NCAA Division II). Their first home game was marked by a 98–77 loss to Florida at Curtis Hixon Hall in downtown Tampa, which would serve as USF's primary arena of the seven courts the team would call home before the opening of the on campus Sun Dome for the 1980–81 season, and was the only arena USF used every season through 1980. South Florida's first home win would come on December 18 against Baldwin Wallace. The Brahmans topped 100 points for the first time in just their tenth game, beating Florida A&M 103–102. USF only played one game at their other home for the 1971–72 season, beating Missouri-St. Louis 85–82 at Fort Homer W. Hesterly Armory in West Tampa. The Golden Brahmans would finish their inaugural season with a record of 8–17, but recorded their first winning season the next year going 14–11.

For the 1973–74 season USF made the jump to NCAA Division I, where they remain today. That year would see the Brahmans split time in 3 arenas, the aforementioned Curtis Hixon Hall and Fort Homer W. Hesterly Armory, as well as the Bayfront Center in St. Petersburg, Florida. The Bayfront Center was nearly 40 miles from USF's main campus in Tampa, but sat across the street from the USF St. Petersburg campus. Games were played there in the coming years to give the students at the St. Petersburg campus the rare opportunity to watch their school play a few times per year. They posted a 10–3 combined record at their 3 home courts, but were only 1–13 in road and neutral site games, and for that reason USF fired their first coach Don Williams. The Golden Brahmans recorded their first 15 win season in 1974–75 under first year coach Bill Gibson. Gibson died of a heart attack in the summer of 1975 at the age of 47.

Under new coach Chip Conner, USF finally recorded their first win at the Bayfront Center on senior night of their 1975–76 campaign. That season also brought the Brahmans their fourth home in the Lakeland Civic Center (now known as the RP Funding Center) in Lakeland, Florida, and gave South Florida its best win percentage for a men's basketball season until 2023–24 at .704 with a 19–8 record.

The next year, the Golden Brahmans joined the Sun Belt Conference, but took a big step backwards compared to the previous year going just 9–18 overall and 2–4 in conference games. The Brahmans found yet another building to call home in 1977–78, playing 2 games at Hillsborough Community College. They played their first game on their own campus on opening night of the 1978–79 season, beating Eckerd College 90–70 at the USF Gymnasium, which still stands today adjacent to the Yuengling Center as the Campus Recreation Center. USF went undefeated in their 3 on campus games that season, much to the delight of the students who could now attend games more easily. However, USF decided not to play any games on campus for the 1979–80 season, instead opting to play home games at their seventh and final arena before moving on campus full time with Expo Hall at the Florida State Fairgrounds in Tampa. South Florida fittingly closed out this era with an 81–72 victory at Curtis Hixon Hall against Stetson, the team the Brahmans defeated in their first game.

=== Lee Rose era (1980–1986) ===
USF opened the 1980–81 season with three new things: a new nickname, changing from the Golden Brahmans to the Bulls; a new on-campus arena called the Sun Dome; and a new head coach in Lee Rose. Rose was a close personal friend of USF Athletic Director Dick Bowers and was coming fresh off a Final Four appearance with Purdue the year prior, as well as having another Final Four appearance with USF's fellow Sun Belt member Charlotte in 1977. Rose's Bulls recorded their first win in the Sun Dome on December 6, 1980, against UNC Greensboro after dropping their first two games to Florida A&M and Duke. Led by All-American candidate and all-time leading scorer to that point Tony Grier, the Bulls would not lose another regular season home game for over a year, with the next loss coming after a school record 21 game home winning streak that stands to this day. South Florida ended the regular season 17–9, including their first win against a ranked opponent when they beat No. 18 South Alabama on February 12. The Bulls also made their first postseason tournament, going to the 1981 National Invitation Tournament. Home attendance jumped 256% in the 80–81 season with the new on campus arena, which was soon nicknamed the "Rose Garden" after coach Rose. The Sun Dome also brought another thing: better recruiting. The university's former gym situation was described as "disastrous for recruiting", but the 1981–82 season saw the arrival of highly touted freshman and Tampa native Charlie Bradley. Bradley is widely regarded as the greatest player in USF history and is the school's all-time leading scorer with 2,319 points, despite playing only 1 season with the adoption of the 3 point line. USF finished the 81–82 season with a solid 17–11 showing and a 14–2 record at home. South Florida also won the inaugural Florida Four tournament in December 1981 over Florida, Florida State, and conference foe Jacksonville.

1982–83 was by far the young program's most successful season at the time. The Bulls won the second Florida Four, which was discontinued after the season. The 82–83 squad recorded the first 20 win season in team history, going 22–10. Rose's 82–83 team also finished as runners up in the Sun Belt Conference tournament and won the program's first postseason game, defeating Fordham in the first round of the 1983 National Invitation Tournament. Finally, Charlie Bradley was named Sun Belt Player of the Year for the 1982–83 season. USF followed up their historic season with another 17–11 record in 1983–84, then went 18–12 in 1984–85 with another second round exit in the NIT after upsetting Wake Forest in the first round.

1985–86 was the final year with Lee Rose at the helm for the Bulls, who posted a 14–14 record. Rose would leave the Bulls to become an assistant coach for the San Antonio Spurs. South Florida would finish the 6 season Rose era with an overall record of 106–69.

=== Bobby Paschal era (1986–96) ===
The Bulls first three years under new head coach Bobby Paschal were not good, going an overall 21–63 and all 3 seasons coming with at least 20 losses. Many Bulls fans were calling for Paschal to be fired prior to the 1989–90 season. But the Bulls turned it around, becoming one of the only teams in NCAA men's basketball history to go from 20 losses to 20 wins in a single season. USF made its first NCAA tournament, claiming the Sun Belt's autobid to the Big Dance after winning the conference tournament behind future USF Athletic Hall of Fame inductee Radenko Dobraš's Sun Belt Tournament MVP showing. USF's dream season ended with a hard-fought 79–67 loss to 2nd seed Arizona. South Florida nearly eclipsed the 20 win mark again the next season, winning 19 games and securing their fourth NIT berth in 11 years.

In 1991–92, the Bulls left the Sun Belt for the Metro Conference and won 19 games for the second straight year, securing an at-large berth in the 1992 NCAA tournament. This stretch is the only time in program history where the Bulls have made a postseason tournament in three consecutive years. The departure of Radenko Dobraš after 1992 brought the arrival of another USF Hall of Fame member in freshman Chucky Atkins, but the Bulls struggled in 1992–93 and 93–94, going 8–19 and 10–17 respectively. USF turned it around in 1994–95, going 18–12 and making the quarterfinals of the 1995 NIT.

USF had another new conference for the 1995–96 season after the Metro Conference merged with the Great Midwest Conference to form Conference USA. The Bulls finished just 2–12 in their new conference and 12–16 overall in what would be Bobby Paschal's last year as head coach. Paschal retired from his position, but stayed with the team in an advisory role for another 8 years, and would later be inducted into the USF Athletic Hall of Fame. In Paschal's 10 years as head coach, South Florida went 127–159, the most wins all time by any USF men's basketball coach.

=== Seth Greenberg era (1996–2003) ===
After Paschal stepped down, the Bulls poached Long Beach State head coach Seth Greenberg. Greenberg had made two NCAA tournaments in the previous four years with LBSU and was coming off a Big West Conference regular season title. It was believed Greenberg would keep both his and the program's momentum going with USF. In Greenberg's first year as coach however, the Bulls finished just 8–19. 1997–98 was a turnaround though, and South Florida picked up a 17–13 record. After an even 14–14 campaign in 1998–99, USF won another 17 games and a regular season Conference USA Red Division title at the turn of the millennium, and qualified for the NIT for the first time in five years. The Bulls were ousted in the first round at New Mexico. USF improved even further the next two years, going 18–13 and 19–13 respectively. Greenberg's squad would only see one postseason game out of these seasons though, a loss to Ball State in the first round of the 2002 NIT.

After a 15–14 season in 2002–03 with two starters out due to injuries, Greenberg left Tampa to become the head coach at Virginia Tech, citing his desire to coach in the Big East. His teams had a total record of 108–100, making him one of three USF head coaches to eclipse 100 wins (Rose and Paschall) and one of three to post an overall winning record at the school (Gibson and Rose).

=== Big East years ===
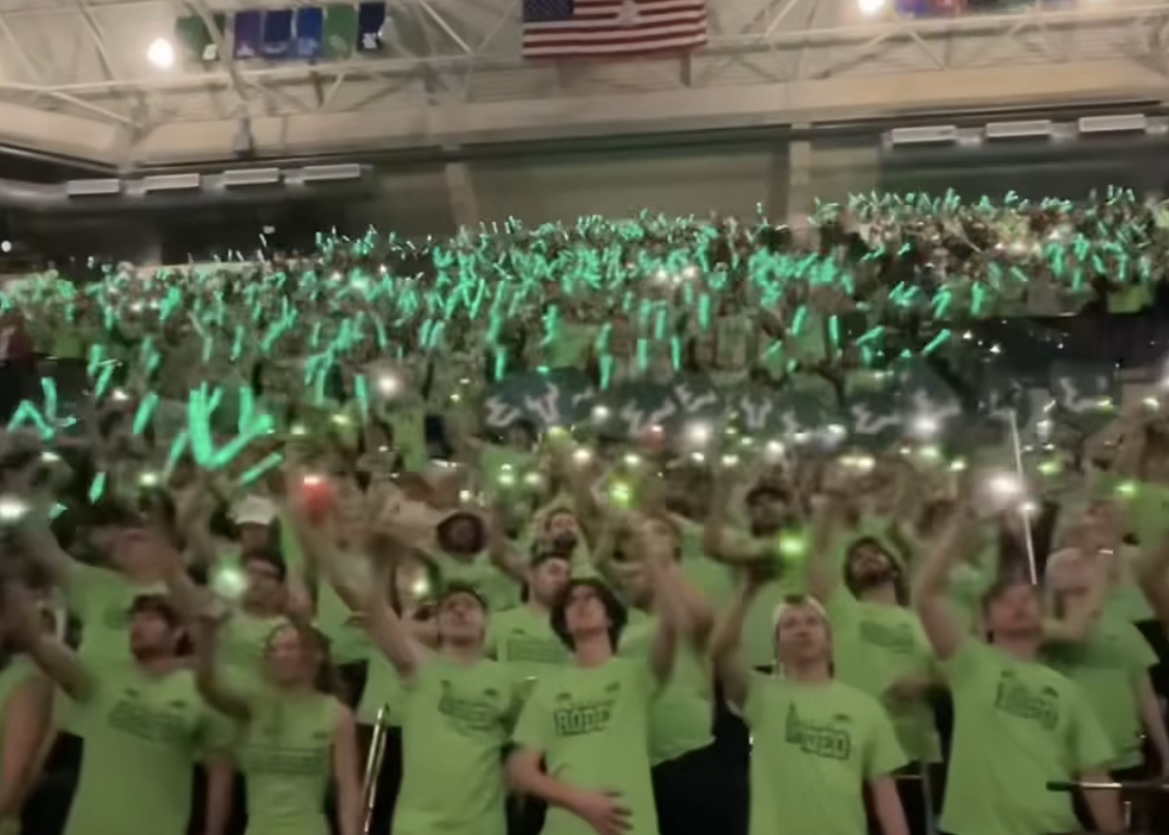
The So Flo Rodeo, USF's student section, along with part of the Rumble pep band.

USF's second to last year in Conference USA and first under new coach Robert McCullum would give them 20 losses for the first time since 1988–89, a streak that lasted 15 years. Their last year before joining the Big East was somewhat better at 14–16.

The University of South Florida received an invitation to join the Big East to counteract Boston College, Miami, and ironically for former Bulls coach Seth Greenberg, Virginia Tech leaving for the Atlantic Coast Conference. The basketball team's first season in the new conference was marked by their second 20 loss season in three years, going 7–22. They went an abysmal 1–15 against Big East foes, last place in the conference. In what would be McCullum's last year as head coach, the Bulls went 12–18 in 2006–07 and nearly finished last in the conference again. Athletic Director Lee Roy Selmon fired McCullum, whose four teams went a total of 40–76 and 10–54 in conference games. In 2007, former player Tony Grier authored "A Raging Bull" Chasing the Big Time, the only comprehensive overview of the rapid rise of the basketball program and sports in general at USF.

The Bulls would go on to hire former Arkansas coach Stan Heath, and yet again came dangerously close to losing 20 games in 2007–08. The next year USF picked up a third 20 loss season in six years with a 9–22 record. The lone bright spot of the year was their first win against a top 10 opponent, defeating No. 8 Marquette by one point on February 6, 2009. Coach Heath shined on the hot seat the next season, bringing the school its first 20 win season in 20 years, receiving votes in the AP Poll for the first time in team history, and making the 2010 NIT, though they lost in the first round of their first postseason appearance since 2002 to NC State. It was the second time the Bulls had gone from 20 losses to 20 wins in a single season, and they would do it again two years later.

After a 10–23 showing in their 2010–11 campaign, the Bulls turned it around yet again in 2011–12, playing without their usual home court as the Sun Dome was undergoing renovations. The Tampa Bay Times Forum proved to be good luck for the Bulls as their main home, going 10–2 in those games. They also played some home games at the Bob Martinez Sports Center on the University of Tampa's campus (where they went 3–0) and at one at their former home Lakeland Civic Center, which was now called the Lakeland Center (1–0). Despite being selected on media day to finish 14th in the Big East, the Bulls had a winning record in conference games for the first time since leaving Conference USA, going 12–6 which put them tied for 4th. After a 20-year drought, their 20–13 record on Selection Sunday earned USF their third ever bid to the NCAA tournament. As a No. 12 seed, they would have to face California in the First Four play in game. There, South Florida won their first NCAA tournament game in school history 65–54 and advanced to play No. 5 seed Temple. The Bulls shocked the world again by upsetting the Owls 58–44 to move on to the round of 32 for the first time ever. This win tied the school record for wins in a season at 22. The Cinderella story would end in the next round though, as the Bulls fell to the Ohio Bobcats 62–56. The Bulls received one vote in the final Coaches Poll of the season, their first in team history. After the season, Stan Heath was named Big East Coach of the Year.

Looking to show that 2011–12 was not a fluke, USF started the 2012–13 season at a respectable 10–3. But it would only go downhill from there, as the Bulls went just 3–15 against Big East opponents for a final record of 12–19. This would be the Bulls last season in the Big East as the conference would split prior to the 2013–14 season, where South Florida went 12–20 overall and 3–15 in the new American Athletic Conference (now the American Conference). After the season, Stan Heath was fired by USF. His teams went a total of 97–130.

=== Orlando Antigua era (2014–2017) ===
Dominican National Team Head Coach and Kentucky Wildcats assistant Orlando Antigua was hired to replace Heath and turn the program around. Antigua was an assistant at Kentucky for five years with two Final Fours under his belt and had won a national championship with the Wildcats in 2012. Antigua went 9–23 and 7–24 in his first two seasons respectively, and was fired midway through the 2016–17 season. Assistant Coach Murry Bartow served as interim coach for the remainder of the year.

=== Brian Gregory era (2017–2023) ===
The Bulls then hired Brian Gregory, a consultant at Michigan State under Tom Izzo to become the tenth coach in program history. After a fifth straight 20 loss season in 2017–18, South Florida bounced back more than many Bulls fans could have ever hoped in 2018–19. The Bulls won 24 games for the first time in school history, and won the College Basketball Invitational against former Big East rival DePaulWith the help of freshman Scott Moore Jr. Coming in red hot off a senior night comeback victory after being down by 7 with 24 seconds to play, capped off by a buzzer beater from senior Laquincy Rideau, the Bulls 2019–20 season was cut short less than an hour before they were set to play rival Central Florida in round one of the conference tournament due to the COVID-19 pandemic, ending their season at 14–17. After disappointing campaigns in his following three seasons, Gregory was fired by the Bulls.

=== Amir Abdur-Rahim era (2023–2024) ===
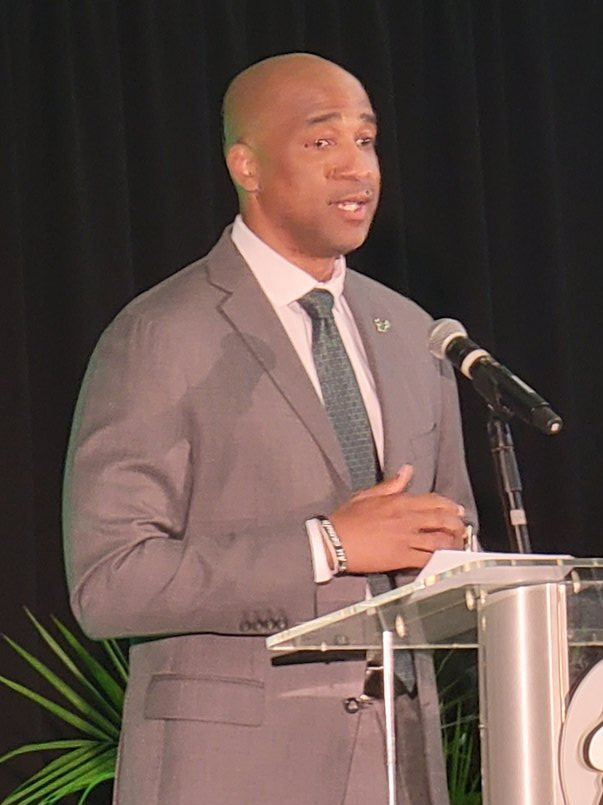
Amir Abdur-Rahim 2024

USF hired former Kennesaw State head coach Amir Abdur-Rahim as Gregory's replacement. Abdur-Rahim had just led Kennesaw State to their first Division I NCAA Tournament the prior season. During the 2023–24 season, USF defeated a top-10 opponent for the second time in team history, erasing a 20-point deficit on the road against No. 10 Memphis. On February 12, the Bulls received votes in both the AP Poll and Coaches Poll, their second time receiving votes in each poll, and first time receiving votes in both polls in the same week. The Bulls clinched a share of their first regular season conference title in team history on February 25, the same day they set a new team record with 13 consecutive wins. On February 26, 2024, USF was ranked No. 25 in both the AP and Coaches polls, marking the first time in school history that the team was officially ranked in either poll. The Bulls clinched the conference title outright after defeating Charlotte away on March 2. Amir Abdur-Rahim was unanimously named the American Athletic Conference Coach of the Year and Chris Youngblood was named the AAC Player of the Year. The Bulls reached the NIT and defeated rival Central Florida in the first round before losing to VCU in the second round. Their 25–8 record was the best in program history.

Abdur-Rahim passed away unexpectedly on October 24, 2024 at the age of 43 from complications related to a medical procedure. Following Abdur-Rahim's death, the student section in the Yuengling Center was renamed in his honor and all of USF's sports teams wore green and gold patches with the initials "AAR" for the remainder of the school year. The conference also introduced the Amir Abdur-Rahim Sportsmanship Award, which is presented to the men’s basketball student-athlete who, as determined by the league's head coaches, "best exemplifies the qualities of sportsmanship, fair play and leadership". Ben Fletcher was named USF's interim coach for the 2024–25 season.

=== Brian Hodgson era (2025–2026) ===
On March 24, 2025, USF announced their hiring of Arkansas State head coach Bryan Hodgson as their new head coach to replace Amir Abdur-Rahim. The following year, the Bulls won both the regular and postseason American Conference titles, and qualified for the NCAA Tournament for the first time in 14 years.

== Season-by-season results ==
Year	Conference	Games played	Record	Win percentage	Conference record	Head coach	Postseason
1971–72	Independent (College Division)	25	8–17	.320	N/A	Don Williams	
1972–73	Independent (College Division)	25	14–11	.560	N/A	Don Williams	
1973–74	Independent (Division I)	25	11–14	.440	N/A	Don Williams	
1974–75	Independent (Division I)	25	15–10	.600	N/A	Bill Gibson	
1975–76	Independent (Division I)	27	19–8	.704	N/A	Chip Conner	
1976–77	Sun Belt Conference	27	9–18	.333	2–4	Chip Conner	
1977–78	Sun Belt Conference	27	13–14	.481	2–8	Chip Conner	
1978–79	Sun Belt Conference	28	14–14	.500	6–4	Chip Conner	
1979–80	Sun Belt Conference	27	6–21	.222	1–13	Chip Conner/Gordon Gibbons (interim)	
1980–81	Sun Belt Conference	29	18–11	.621	7–5	Lee Rose	NIT (first round)
1981–82	Sun Belt Conference	28	17–11	.607	4–6	Lee Rose	
1982–83	Sun Belt Conference	32	22–10	.688	8–6	Lee Rose	NIT (second round)
1983–84	Sun Belt Conference	28	17–11	.607	9–5	Lee Rose	
1984–85	Sun Belt Conference	30	18–12	.600	6–8	Lee Rose	NIT (second round)
1985–86	Sun Belt Conference	28	14–14	.500	5–9	Lee Rose	
1986–87	Sun Belt Conference	28	8–20	.286	3–11	Bobby Paschal	
1987–88	Sun Belt Conference	28	6–22	.214	3–11	Bobby Paschal	
1988–89	Sun Belt Conference	28	7–21	.250	2–12	Bobby Paschal	
1989–90	Sun Belt Conference	31	20–11	.645	**9–5 (Won conference tournament)**	Bobby Paschal	NCAA (round of 64)
1990–91	Sun Belt Conference	30	19–11	.633	8–6	Bobby Paschal	NIT (first round)
1991–92	Metro Conference	29	19–10	.655	7–5	Bobby Paschal	NCAA (round of 64)
1992–93	Metro Conference	27	8–19	.296	2–10	Bobby Paschal	
1993–94	Metro Conference	27	10–17	.370	2–10	Bobby Paschal	
1994–95	Metro Conference	30	18–12	.600	5–7	Bobby Paschal	NIT (quarterfinals)
1995–96	Conference USA	28	12–16	.429	2–12	Bobby Paschal	
1996–97	Conference USA	27	8–19	.296	2–12	Seth Greenberg	
1997–98	Conference USA	30	17–13	.567	7–9	Seth Greenberg	
1998–99	Conference USA	28	14–14	.500	6–10	Seth Greenberg	
1999–00	Conference USA	31	17–14	.548	8–8	Seth Greenberg	NIT (first round)
2000–01	Conference USA	31	18–13	.581	9–7	Seth Greenberg	
2001–02	Conference USA	32	19–13	.594	8–8	Seth Greenberg	NIT (first round)
2002–03	Conference USA	29	15–14	.517	7–9	Seth Greenberg	
2003–04	Conference USA	27	7–20	.259	1–15	Robert McCullum	
2004–05	Conference USA	30	14–16	.467	5–11	Robert McCullum	
2005–06	Big East	29	7–22	.241	1–15	Robert McCullum	
2006–07	Big East	30	12–18	.400	3–13	Robert McCullum	
2007–08	Big East	31	12–19	.387	3–15	Stan Heath	
2008–09	Big East	31	9–22	.290	4–14	Stan Heath	
2009–10	Big East	33	20–13	.606	9–9	Stan Heath	NIT (first round)
2010–11	Big East	33	10–23	.303	3–15	Stan Heath	
2011–12	Big East	36	22–14	.611	12–6	Stan Heath	NCAA (round of 32)
2012–13	Big East	31	12–19	.387	3–15	Stan Heath	
2013–14	American Conference	32	12–20	.375	3–15	Stan Heath	
2014–15	American Conference	32	9–23	.281	3–15	Orlando Antigua	
2015–16	American Conference	31	7–24	.226	4–14	Orlando Antigua	
2016–17	American Conference	30	7–23	.233	1–17	Orlando Antigua/Murry Bartow (interim)	
2017–18	American Conference	32	10–22	.313	3–15	Brian Gregory	
2018–19	American Conference	38	24–14	.631	8–10	Brian Gregory	**CBI (champions)**
2019–20	American Conference	31	14–17	.452	7–11	Brian Gregory	Postseason not played due to COVID-19 pandemic
2020–21	American Conference	22	9–13	.409	4–10	Brian Gregory	
2021–22	American Conference	31	8–23	.258	3–15	Brian Gregory	
2022–23	American Conference	32	14–18	.438	7–11	Brian Gregory	
2023–24	American Conference	33	25–8	.758	16–2	Amir Abdur-Rahim	NIT (second round)
2024–25	American Conference	32	13–19	.406	6–12	Ben Fletcher (interim)	
2025–26	American Conference	34	25–9	.735	**15–3 (Won conference tournament)**	Bryan Hodgson	NCAA (round of 64)
Total		1651	753–898	.450	265–488		14 Appearances (12–14 record)
Bold indicates tournament won Italics indicate Conference Championship

== Postseason ==
=== NCAA tournament results ===
The Bulls have appeared in the NCAA tournament four times. Their combined record is 2–4.

Year	Seed	Round	Opponent	Result
1990	#15	First Round	#2 Arizona	L 67–79
1992	#11	First Round	#6 Georgetown	L 60–75
2012	#12	First Four	#12 California	W 65–54
2012	#12	First Round	#5 Temple	W 58–44
2012	#12	Second Round	#13 Ohio	L 56–62
2026	#11	First Round	#6 Louisville	L 79–83

=== NIT results ===
The Bulls have appeared in the National Invitation Tournament 9 times. Their combined record is 5–9.

Year	Round	Opponent	Result
1981	First Round	Connecticut	L 55–65
1983	First Round	Fordham	W 81–69
1983	Second Round	Ole Miss	L 57–65
1985	First Round	Wake Forest	W 77–66
1985	Second Round	Louisville	L 61–68
1991	First Round	Fordham	L 66–76
1995	First Round	St. John's	W 74–68
1995	Second Round	Coppin State	W 75–59
1995	Quarterfinal	Marquette	L 60–67
2000	First Round	New Mexico	L 58–64
2002	First Round	Ball State	L 92–98
2010	First Round	NC State	L 57–58
2024	First Round	UCF	W 83–77
2024	Second Round	VCU	L 65–70

=== CBI Results ===
The Bulls have appeared in the College Basketball Invitational (CBI) tournament one time. Their record is 5–1 and were champions in 2019.

Year	Round	Opponent	Result
2019	First Round	Stony Brook	W 82–79^{OT}
2019	Quarterfinal	Utah Valley	W 66–57
2019	Semifinal	Loyola-Marymount	W 56–47
2019	Finals Game 1	DePaul	W 63–61
2019	Finals Game 2	DePaul	L 96–100^{OT}
2019	Finals Game 3	DePaul	W 77–65

== Awards and recognition ==
=== Retired numbers and Athletic Hall of Fame ===
USF has retired three jerseys in program history.

South Florida Bulls retired numbers
No.	Player	Pos.	Career
12	Chucky Atkins	PG	1992–1996
30	Charlie Bradley	SF	1981–1985
31	Radenko Dobraš	G	1988–1992

All 3, along with former coach Bobby Paschal are members of the USF Athletic Hall of Fame.

=== Bulls in the NBA ===
- Gary Alexander
- Chucky Atkins
- Jim Grandholm
- Dominique Jones
- Solomon Jones
- Curtis Kitchen

=== Bulls in the Euroleague and international leagues ===
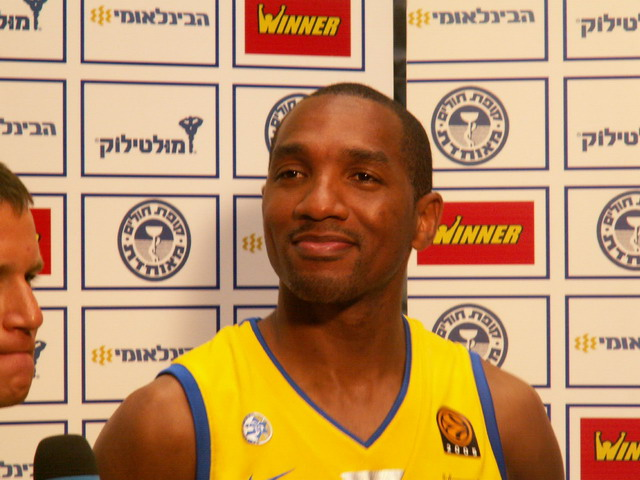
Derrick Sharp

- Jimmy Baxter, professional basketball player for Toros de Aragua
- Charlie Bradley, played in Argentina, Spain and Venezuela.
- Radenko Dobraš, professional player for Hapoel Tel Aviv and Hapoel Jerusalem
- John Egbunu (born 1994), Nigerian-born American basketball player for Hapoel Jerusalem of the Israeli Basketball Premier League
- Javontae Hawkins (born 1993), basketball player for Hapoel Ironi Eilat in the Israeli Basketball Premier League
- Zach LeDay (born 1994), power forward for Hapoel Tel Aviv in the Israeli Basketball Premier League
- Victor Rudd, professional basketball player for Maccabi Tel Aviv of the Israeli Basketball Premier League and the Euroleague
- Derrick Sharp, American-Israeli professional basketball point guard and shooting guard for Maccabi Tel Aviv
- Tomer Steinhauer, Israeli basketball coach and former center

== Media ==
Under the current American Conference TV deal, all home and in-conference away men's basketball games are shown on one of the various ESPN networks or streamed live on ESPN+. Live radio broadcasts of games are featured on WRBQ 104.7 FM in the Tampa Bay and Southwest Florida media markets and are also available worldwide for free on the Bulls Unlimited digital radio station on TuneIn.

== See also ==
- South Florida Bulls
- South Florida Bulls men's basketball statistical leaders
- South Florida Bulls women's basketball
