= 2008–09 Georgetown Hoyas men's basketball team =

American college basketball season

2008–2009 Georgetown Hoyas men's basketball

National Invitation Tournament, first round
- Conference: Big East Conference
- Record: 16–15 (7–11 Big East)
- Head coach: John Thompson III (5th season)
- Assistant coaches: Robert Burke (5th season); Kenya Hunter (2nd season); David Cox (2nd season)
- Captain: Jessie Sapp
- Home arena: Verizon Center

2008–09 Big East men's basketball standings
	Conf.				Overall
Team	W		L	PCT	W		L	PCT
No. 1 Louisville†	16	–	2	.889	31	–	6	.838
No. 4 Pittsburgh	15	–	3	.833	31	–	5	.861
No. 5 Connecticut	15	–	3	.833	31	–	5	.861
No. 11 Villanova	13	–	5	.722	30	–	8	.789
No. 23 Marquette	12	–	6	.667	25	–	10	.714
No. 13 Syracuse	11	–	7	.611	28	–	10	.737
West Virginia	10	–	8	.556	23	–	12	.657
Providence	10	–	8	.556	19	–	14	.576
Notre Dame	8	–	10	.444	21	–	15	.583
Cincinnati	8	–	10	.444	18	–	14	.563
Seton Hall	7	–	11	.389	17	–	15	.531
Georgetown	7	–	11	.389	16	–	15	.516
St. John's	6	–	12	.333	16	–	18	.471
South Florida	4	–	14	.222	9	–	22	.290
Rutgers	2	–	16	.111	11	–	21	.344
DePaul	0	–	18	.000	9	–	24	.273
† 2009 Big East tournament winner As of April 4, 2009; Rankings from AP Poll

The 2008–09 Georgetown Hoyas men's basketball team represented Georgetown University in the 2008–2009 NCAA Division I basketball season. The Hoyas were coached by John Thompson III and played their home games at the Verizon Center in Washington, DC. The Hoyas were members of the original Big East Conference. They finished the season 16–15, 7–11 in Big East play. They lost to St. John's in the first round of the 2009 Big East men's basketball tournament. They received an at-large bid to the 2009 National Invitation Tournament, earning a 6 seed in one of the NIT's regions, and lost to Baylor in the first round.

== Season recap ==
=== Regular season ===
Coming off a 2007–08 season which saw a second consecutive Big East Conference regular-season championship, a second straight appearance in the Big East tournament final, a third straight NCAA tournament appearance, and a postseason No. 12 national ranking for Georgetown, the Hoyas were expected to have another impressive season even though only one scholarship senior, Jessie Sapp, returned for 2008–09. Although four-year starter and point guard Jonathan Wallace had graduated in 2008, sophomore guard Chris Wright, recovered from a broken foot that caused him to miss much of the 2007–08 campaign, was expected to fill in ably as his successor, and the Hoyas placed great confidence in freshman center Greg Monroe as the next "big man" who could replace center Roy Hibbert, who also had graduated in 2008. Although guard Jeremiah Rivers had transferred to Indiana during the offseason, sophomore guard Austin Freeman returned after a very promising first year. At forward, Patrick Ewing Jr., had departed through graduation, but junior DaJuan Summers returned and, although forward Vernon Macklin had transferred to Florida after the previous season in search of greater playing time, sophomore forward Julian Vaughn joined the Hoyas after playing for a season at Florida State. Freshman center Henry Sims also joined the team to come off the bench behind Monroe. The Hoyas entered the season with a No. 22 ranking in the preseason Associated Press Poll.

==== Non-conference schedule ====
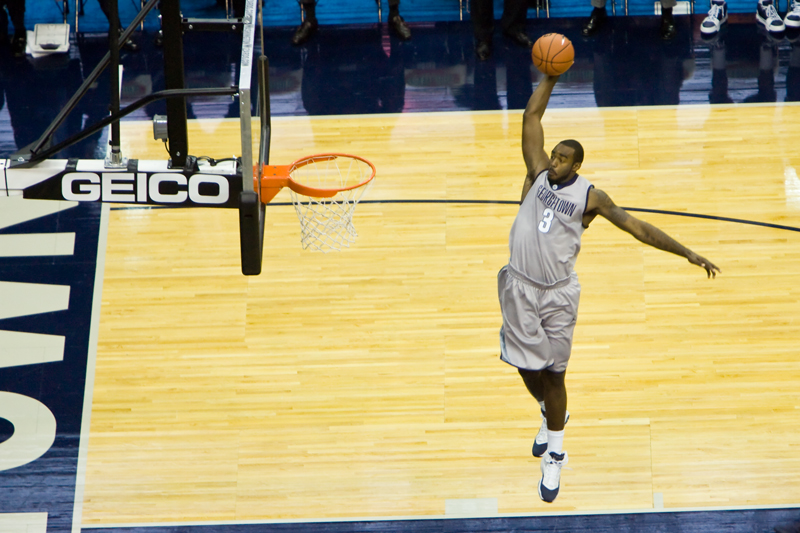
DaJuan Summers comes in for a dunk against Drexel at the Verizon Center on November 22, 2008. He scored 10 points against the Dragons.

The season began well enough with Georgetown displaying a strong defense in wins over Jacksonville and Drexel and Monroe showing his expected defensive prowess and making the first Georgetown score, rebound, and blocked shot of the year. He scored 14 points, grabbed seven rebounds, and blocked three shots against Jacksonville and contributed 20 points, eight rebounds, four assists, three steals, and three blocked shots against Drexel, a game in which he shot 7-for-9 (77.8 percent) from the field. Chris Wright had 16 points, five rebounds, and four assists against Jacksonville and 11 points, seven assists, and five rebounds in the Drexel game, while Summers and Sapp each scored 13 points against Jacksonville. Summers finished with 10 against Drexel.

Moving up to No. 21 in the AP Poll, the Hoyas next traveled to Lake Buena Vista, Florida, to play in the Old Spice Classic. They met Wichita State in the first round in a game in which the Shockers outrebounded the Hoyas 17–6 but shot only 27.9 percent from the field, and Georgetown went 8-for-8 in free throws in the final minute to preserve a 58–50 victory, with Austin Freeman scoring a game-high 18 points, DaJuan Summers 14, and Greg Monroe 11. In the semi-final the following day, the Hoyas faced No. 12 Tennessee, their first ranked opponent of the season. Four Hoyas – Chris Wright with 18 points, DaJuan Summers with 17, Greg Monroe with 15, and Austin Freeman with 12 – scored in double figures as Georgetown shot 53 percent from the field. But Georgetown also committed 20 turnovers, including 10 in the first 15 minutes, and had an uncharacteristically porous defense, allowing the Volunteers also to shoot 53 percent from the field, and Tennessee had a 39–37 advantage at halftime. Early in the second half, the Hoyas went on a 23–10 run to pull ahead, 65–57, but the Volunteers then responded with a 10–1 run of their own to take a 67–66 lead, followed by an 8–3 run to give Tennessee a 75–69 advantage. With some starters in early foul trouble on both sides, both teams′ benches saw significant playing time, and that worked to Tennessee's advantage, with the Volunteers′ bench outscoring the Hoyas′ bench 37–12. Tennessee handed the Hoyas their first defeat, 90–78. Georgetown thus met Maryland two days later in the fifth-place game, only the third meeting between the cross-town rivals since 1980, the first since the 2001 NCAA tournament, and the first during the regular season since 1993. Freeman scored 18 points, Summers contributed 14, Monroe had 12, and Jessie Sapp scored 10 as the Hoyas made 10 of their first 14 shots, shot 53.1 percent from the field, and held the Terrapins to 36.1 percent shooting. Georgetown led by as many as 21 points in the first half, by 38–20 at halftime, by 61–33 with 13 minutes left in the second half, and by 73–38 with 7½ minutes to play on the way to an easy 75–48 victory to secure fifth place.

With a record of 4–1 and ranked No. 20, the Hoyas returned to the Verizon Center for a five-game homestand. In the first two, they easily defeated American and Savannah State, the latter coached by former Georgetown player Horace Broadnax. Chris Wright scored a career-high 22 points and DaJuan Summers and Jessie Sapp had 14 points each against American in a game in which American scored only 12 points in the first half, the lowest score by a Georgetown opponent in the first half since John Thompson III took over as the Hoyas′ head coach in 2004. In the Savannah State game two days later, Georgetown, by then ranked No. 19, scored 100 points for the second time in John Thompson III's tenure and had a 62-point margin of victory that was its biggest since a 112–39 defeat of the University of the District of Columbia on December 16, 1989. Freeman, Sapp, and Summers had 14 points each, Monroe had 13, and freshman guard Jason Clark came off the bench to score 10 against Savannah State.

In the third game of the homestand, Georgetown faced No. 17 Memphis. Summers led the team with 21 points, Austin Freeman scored 18, Chris Wright added 14 points and played an excellent defensive game against Tigers point guard Tyreke Evans, and Greg Monroe had 13 points and six rebounds. It was a tight game, with Memphis leading 38–37 at the half, and for six of the last 6½ minutes of the second half neither team led by more than one point, Freeman finally putting the Hoyas ahead 66–64 with a free throw with 31 seconds left in regulation. The Tigers scored to tie the game at 66–66 and force overtime, but thereafter shot 1-for-9 from the field while the Hoyas outscored Memphis 13–4 during overtime for a 79–70 upset victory. Although Memphis outrebounded Georgetown 53–36, the Tigers shot only 35 percent from the field. The win stretched Georgetown's home winning streak to 26 games, which the Hoyas then extended to 28 straight as the homestand concluded with victories over Mount St. Mary's – the first meeting of the schools since January 1962, with Chris Wright scoring a game-high 19 points, DaJuan Summers adding 13, and Jessie Sapp grabbing a career-high nine rebounds – and Florida International. In the Florida International game, the first game between the schools since December 1989, the Hoyas held the Golden Panthers to a total of 38 points, the lowest scoring total in Florida International's history. On the Georgetown side, Austin Freeman scored 17 points, Chris Wright had 14, and DaJuan Summers added 13, while Greg Monroe had 10 points, six rebounds, and five steals.

==== Conference schedule ====
Ranked No. 11, with a record of 9–1 and the winners of six straight games, the Hoyas closed out 2008 by opening their Big East Conference schedule with a visit to No. 2 Connecticut, which had won seven straight games against ranked opponents. Georgetown began the game with an 18–3 run against the veteran Huskies, and led 36–27 at halftime. Thirteen seconds into the second half, Greg Monroe hit a three-pointer to stretch the lead to 39–27, but Connecticut then went on a 13–1 run to close to a 40–37 deficit. With Georgetown clinging to a 42–39 lead with 13:19 left to play, Austin Freeman sparked Georgetown's offense, scoring seven of the first nine points of a 14–6 Georgetown run that gave the Hoyas a 56–45 advantage with 9:46 remaining. Connecticut never got closer than nine points the rest of the way, and Georgetown led by as many as 17 points in pulling off a 74–63 upset victory. In the second half, the Hoyas made 18 straight free throws and finished 18-for-21 (85.7 percent) from the free-throw line. DaJuan Summers had 18 points, Chris Wright and Greg Monroe scored 16 points each, and Freeman added 13. It was Georgetown's eighth straight win in a Big East season opener, five of them under John Thompson III. The Hoyas′ winning streak grew to seven, and their record improved to 10–1.

At the time Georgetown upset Connecticut, the Big East boasted seven ranked teams, and the relatively young and inexperienced Hoyas faced a challenging conference schedule as a result. Connecticut was the first of three ranked teams the Hoyas faced to open their conference schedule, leading John Thompson III to note in a postgame interview, "The commissioner isn't handing out trophies tonight and it doesn't get easier." With that in mind, the Hoyas began 2009 by hosting No. 3 Pittsburgh in their next game. Although DaJuan Summers scored 22 points and Greg Monroe added 15, the undefeated Panthers used their depth to dominate Georgetown, outrebounding the Hoyas 46–21 and outscoring them from the paint 48–22, while Pittsburgh's bench outscored Georgetown's 14–2. Leading 33–30 at halftime, the Panthers shot 53 percent from the field in the second half and pulled out to a 55–44 lead with 7:47 left in the game. Pittsburgh sophomore forward DeJuan Blair had a double-double (20 points and 17 rebounds), and Pittsburgh won 70–54. The loss ended Georgetown's 29-game home winning streak.

The following day, the Hoyas left for South Bend, Indiana, for a January 5 game at No. 13 Notre Dame – winners of 43 straight home games – by which time Georgetown had climbed to No. 9 in the AP Poll. Greg Monroe led the Hoyas with a double-double (21 points and 10 rebounds) and Chris Wright scored 13, while DaJuan Summers contributed 11, his second-lowest scoring performance of the season. Notre Dame junior forward Luke Harangody, meanwhile, led the Fighting Irish, scoring the last 13 Notre Dame points of the first half to give Notre Dame a 39–28 lead at halftime and, despite sitting with four fouls with 15:17 left to play and Notre Dame leading by six, reentered the game less than four minutes later and scored 10 points and grabbed five rebounds before time expired. Georgetown battled back to a 71–67 deficit with 13 seconds left, but the Fighting Irish upset the Hoyas 73–67 to extend their home winning streak to 44 and hand Georgetown consecutive losses for the first time since January 2007. Harangody finished with a double-double (31 points and 11 rebounds).

Georgetown returned to the Verizon Center for a two-game homestand that began with a come-from-behind win over Providence in which Greg Monroe had a double-double (13 points and 10 rebounds) along with eight assists and five steals, Austin Freeman scored 18 points, Chris Wright had 16, and Jason Clark contributed 10. The Hoyas dropped to No. 13 in the AP Poll by the time they met another ranked opponent, No. 8 Syracuse, winners of seven straight, in their next game. The underdog Hoyas rose to the occasion with their best three-point-shooting performance of the season, scoring on 12 out of 21 shots (57.1 percent) from three-point range. Opening with a 10–2 lead, Georgetown scored 14 straight points halfway through the first half as part of a 21–4 run that saw the Hoyas make 11 straight shots over nine minutes and stake themselves to a 37–18 lead with 4:25 left. With a four-point play, Austin Freeman gave the Hoyas a 47–26 lead with two minutes left, and Georgetown went into the locker room at halftime with a 50–32 advantage. The Orange rallied to begin the second half with eight unanswered points, and closed to a 53–45 deficit with 15:43 left to play, but DaJuan Summers hit a three-pointer 11 seconds later to stretch the lead to 56–45. Georgetown led by double digits for the rest of the game on the way to an 88–74 upset victory, dealing Syracuse its first conference loss of the season. DaJuan Summers had a game-high 21 points, while Austin Freeman shot 4-for-5 in three-pointers and scored 19 and Greg Monroe had 10 points and six rebounds. The 88 points were the most a Georgetown team had scored against a Big East opponent since John Thompson III's arrival in 2004, and the Hoya bench played a major role, scoring 29 points, including a career-high 12 points by Jason Clark.

Three days later, Georgetown played its last nonconference game of the season, taking on yet another ranked opponent, no less than No. 2 Duke, in a visit to Durham, North Carolina. Duke entered the game having won seven straight games and riding a 67-game winning streak on its home court against non-Atlantic Coast Conference opponents. The game was tied 29–29 with 4:39 remaining in the first half, but Duke reeled off 11 straight points while holding Georgetown scoreless and led 40–29 at halftime; the Hoyas went into the locker room without having scored a field goal in the last 7½ minutes of the half. The Blue Devils pulled ahead to a 15-point lead early in the second half, but Georgetown responded with a 13–2 run and closed to 46–42 with 15:33 left to play. But when Henry Sims was called for a blocking foul with 15:08 left, Greg Monroe objected so strongly from the bench that he was called for a technical foul, his fourth foul of the game. The momentum shifted back in Duke's favor, and the Blue Devils went on a 15–3 run to take a 61–45 lead with 10:43 left in the game. The Hoyas battled back to a 72–67 deficit with 38 seconds remaining, but Duke hit four free throws in the game's last 30 seconds to clinch a 76–67 victory. In a losing cause, DaJuan Summers led the Hoyas with 21 points and seven rebounds, while Austin Freeman scored 15 and Monroe contributed 12 points and six rebounds.

Georgetown emerged from the Duke game with a respectable 12–4 record against a tough schedule, including 3–2 in the Big East and 3–4 against ranked opponents, and even climbed to No. 12 in the AP Poll. But then the Hoyas′ season took a marked downturn, as the Duke setback was only the beginning of what turned out to be a five-game losing streak. Returning to conference play in their next game, against West Virginia, the Hoyas suffered a surprisingly one-sided loss in which the Mountaineers outshot, outrebounded, and out-defended Georgetown, especially in the second half: The Hoyas shot only 39.2 percent from the field overall – 2-for-16 (12.5 percent) from three-point range – and only 33 percent after halftime. The Hoyas′ shooting woes continued as they were upset again three days later at Seton Hall, which broke a six-game losing streak and won its first conference game of the season despite failing to make a single three-point shot for the first time since December 1991; Georgetown meanwhile shot a season-low 32.7 percent against the Pirates overall and went 3-for-22 (13.6 percent) in three-pointers, meaning the Hoyas had gone a combined 5-for-38 (13.2 percent) in three-pointers against West Virginia and Seton Hall. A fourth loss in a row ensued at Cincinnati in a game in which Georgetown shot 40 percent from the field but only 5-for-17 (29.4 percent) from three-point range while allowing the Bearcats to shoot 45.8 percent from the field. DaJuan Summers had 12 points each against West Virginia and Seton Hall, but sat out the second half of the game against the Bearcats with seven points after twisting his ankle, although he remained Georgetown's leading scorer for the season with 16.1 points per game through the end of the Cincinnati game. Chris Wright scored 13 points against West Virginia, 11 against Seton Hall, and 15 against Cincinnati. Greg Monroe contributed 11 points against West Virginia and 17 against Seton Hall, and 10 points and eight rebounds against Cincinnati, while Austin Freeman had 14 points and six rebounds against Cincinnati.

The fifth consecutive loss came on January 31 in a visit to No. 8 Marquette, a team undefeated in its seven conference games entering the Georgetown game. DaJuan Summers returned to action despite injuring his ankle in the Cincinnati game and tied his season high with 22 points, also pulling down seven rebounds, and Georgetown led by as many as seven points early in the first half. Marquette closed the gap, and the game was tied at 42–42 at halftime and 52–52 with 14:31 left to play. But then the Golden Eagles, led by senior guard Jerel McNeal, who scored 26 points, junior forward Lazar Hayward, who had 23, and senior guard/forward Wesley Matthews, who scored 19 of his 23 points in the second half, went on a decisive 12–2 run and took a 10-point lead with 11:03 remaining. Trailing by as many as 16 points after that, the Hoyas managed to close to an eight-point deficit with 1:03 remaining. However, Marquette went 6-for-8 from the free-throw line in the final minute – part of a 30-for-38 (78.9 percent) free-throw effort for the Golden Eagles during the game, compared to 8-for-13 (61.5 percent) for the Hoyas – to close out a 94–82 victory and drop Georgetown to 12–8 for the season and 3–6 in the conference, despite 19 points from Chris Wright, 13 from Greg Monroe, and 12 from Austin Freeman to go along with Summers′ performance. Plunging from No. 12 to No. 25 in the AP Poll after the loss to Seton Hall, Georgetown dropped out of the Top 25 entirely after losing to Marquette, not to return until the following season.

After enduring their longest losing streak since 2005, the Hoyas staggered back to the Verizon Center to beat Rutgers in a game in which Jessie Sapp came out of his month-and-a-half-long slump to score 11 points, while Greg Monroe contributed 10 and Georgetown preserved a home winning streak against the Scarlet Knights that dated back to January 2000. But an overtime home loss to Cincinnati ensued despite 13 points, six rebounds, and five steals by Greg Monroe and 10 points from Austin Freeman. Georgetown traveled to the Carrier Dome a week later for a rematch with No. 22 Syracuse, which had lost five of its last seven games. The Orange led 33–32 at halftime but scored the first nine points after the intermission and pulled ahead to 66–50 with 8:11 left in the second half before the Hoyas rallied to tie the game at 83–83 at the end of regulation. In overtime, the Hoyas pulled ahead 89–88 with 2:13 remaining, but Syracuse then scored a three-pointer and two free throws to take a 93–89 lead and ultimately prevailed, 98–94. Before fouling out in overtime, Chris Wright scored 25 points, while Austin Freeman had 19 points, DaJuan Summers added 17, and Greg Monroe had a double-double (16 points and 11 rebounds). Sophomore guard/forward Nikita Mescheriakov started at guard in this game – and for the rest of the season – in place of the slumping Jessie Sapp, who was relegated to the bench.

Losers of seven of their last eight games, the Hoyas had an easy win at South Florida, with Chris Wright scoring 17 points, Jessie Sapp adding 10, and Greg Monroe getting another double-double (12 points and 10 rebounds), before three straight games against ranked opponents. The first two – a rematch with No. 11 Marquette and a meeting with No. 6 Louisville – were at the Verizon Center. Against Marquette, on a day when Georgetown celebrated the 25th anniversary of its 1984 national championship, the Hoyas shot 51 percent from the field, with Chris Wright scoring 17 points, Austin Freeman 16, and Greg Monroe 13, while DaJuan Summers, the team's leading scorer for the season, scored 12 before fouling out with 2:47 left in the game. With both teams shooting 60 percent from the field during the game's first 12 minutes, Marquette pulled out to a six-point lead and later to a seven-point lead, but each time the Hoyas closed the gap, and Georgetown twice led by three points in the half's final three minutes before the teams went into the locker room at halftime with the game tied 44–44. In the second half, however, the Golden Eagles committed only one turnover, allowed Georgetown only one three-pointer, and gave up only two offensive rebounds, and Marquette took the lead for good with 7:58 to play on the way to a 78–72 victory. Two days later against Louisville, Georgetown forced the veteran Cardinals to commit 16 turnovers, but Louisville opened by shooting 9-for-9 from the field – not missing for the first 10:59 of the game, by which time the Cardinals led 26–13 – and hit its first seven three-pointers, not missing one until the second half. After their 9-for-9 start, the Cardinals shot only 15-for-35 (42.9 percent) the rest of the game, but they nonetheless led 41–24 with three minutes to play in the first half and 41–31 at halftime, and in the second half they forced Georgetown to commit 14 turnovers and held the Hoyas to only 31 percent shooting from the field to preserve a 76–58 victory. Although Chris Wright scored 12 points and Greg Monroe 10 during the game, the Hoyas never got closer than eight points during the second half.

Six weeks earlier, Georgetown had been ranked No. 9 in the country, but the Louisville loss gave them their ninth defeat in 11 games and dropped them to 12th place in the 16-team Big East. Their demanding schedule continued with a visit to No. 12 Villanova on February 28. Both teams had strong defensive efforts, but Georgetown's defense was the better of the two: The Hoyas held the Wildcats to season lows in points (54), field goals (15), and shooting percentage from the field (33.3), as well as to 3-for-16 (18.8 percent) three-point shooting, and forced Villanova to commit a season-high 20 turnovers. For its part, Villanova forced Georgetown into a season-high 25 turnovers. The game stayed close until Georgetown finally pulled ahead over a 6:52 stretch late in the first half and early in the second during which the Hoyas made nine straight field goals and took a 40–32 lead with 17:21 left to play. Villanova closed to a two-point deficit three times, the last time at 52–50 with 5:02 remaining. Then both teams slumped on offense, with Villanova failing to score a field goal on eight straight possessions and committing three turnovers and Georgetown missing five straight shots from the field and committing two turnovers. The Wildcats closed to 52–51 on a free throw by sophomore guard Corey Stokes with 1:15 left to play, but Chris Wright scored on a layup and two free throws to give Georgetown a decisive 56–51 lead with 10 seconds remaining. DaJuan Summers scored 16 points, Wright had 13, and sophomore guard/forward Nikita Mescheriakov, starting in place of Jessie Sapp, contributed a career-high 11 points as Georgetown upset Villanova 56–54, the Hoyas' fifth straight win over the Wildcats.

Georgetown finished its regular season with an overtime loss at St. John's – the first overtime game in the 91 meetings between the schools – in which the Hoyas blew a 45–30 lead, breaking a five-game Hoya winning streak against the Red Storm, and a low-scoring win at the Verizon Center against DePaul that dealt the Blue Demons their 18th straight defeat and gave them a winless Big East season. Greg Monroe had 18 points against St. John's, while DaJuan Summers scored 10 points against St. John's and 15 in the DePaul game. Austin Freeman sat out the St. John's game with a hip injury, but started the DePaul game and scored two points.

The Hoyas finished the regular season with a record of 16–13 overall and 7–11 in the Big East, tied with Seton Hall for 11th place. It was their first losing record in the conference since the 2003–04 season.

=== Big East tournament ===
Seeded 12th in the 2009 Big East tournament, Georgetown needed to win the tournament championship to make the 2009 NCAA tournament. In the first round, the Hoyas faced the No. 13 seed, St. John's, which had not won a Big East tournament game since 2003 and had only qualified for the tournament once in the previous five years. St. John's led 30–28 at halftime and extended its lead to 46–37 in the second half before the Hoyas went on a 12–0 run to take the lead, 49–46, with 6:05 left to play. The Red Storm took back the lead for good at 53–52 with 3:42 remaining, shooting 6-for-7 from the free-throw line the rest of the way – part of a 24-for-29 (82.8 percent) St. John's free-throw-shooting effort – to secure a 64–59 win and advance to the next round. Chris Wright scored 14 points and Greg Monroe 13, but the Hoyas exited the tournament in the first round for the first time since 2004.

=== National Invitation tournament ===
With a 16–14 record, Georgetown missed the NCAA Tournament for the first time since the 2004–05 season and accepted an invitation to the 2009 National Invitation Tournament, its first NIT appearance since 2005. Seeded sixth in one of the NIT's four regions, the Hoyas faced the region's No. 3 seed, Baylor, in the first round on Baylor's home court. The Hoyas shot 16-for-21 (76.2 percent) from the field in the first half to take a 44–34 lead at halftime, but the Bears opened the second half with a 13–2 run that gave them a 47–46 lead with 16:24 left to play. Georgetown retook the lead and stretched it to as many as five points, but Baylor junior guard Tweety Carter hit a three-pointer with 4:29 to play that gave the Bears the lead for good at 70–67. The Bears were clinging to a 72–69 lead with 11 seconds left when Chris Wright missed a three-pointer and Baylor sophomore guard LaceDarius Dunn grabbed the rebound, took a foul, and made two free throws to give Baylor a 74–69 advantage. DaJuan Summers sank a three-pointer with four seconds remaining to close to 74–72, and, after Carter missed the front half of a one-and-one, attempted his final shot as a Hoya, a long-distance heave that missed. Baylor won a postseason game for the first time since 1950, and Georgetown's disappointing season ended with a 16–15 record and the Hoyas exiting the NIT in the first round for the first time since 1999.

=== Wrap-up ===
For the season, DaJuan Summers led the Hoyas in scoring, shooting 47.4 percent from the field and finishing with 13.6 points per game, while Greg Monroe finished the year with the team's highest field goal percentage (57.2 percent) and averaged 12.7 points per game. Chris Wright and Austin Freeman both shot 48.2 percent, with Wright averaging 12.5 points per game and Freeman 11.4 points. Jessie Sapp slumped during the season, shooting only 34.7 percent from the field and averaging only 6.5 points per game. Freeman missed one game, while the rest of them appeared in all 31 games during the season. Monroe was selected as the Big East Rookie of the Year.

Sapp graduated in 2009, completing a 135-game collegiate career in which he had started 92 times, averaging 7.1 points per game on 41.6 percent shooting from the field. Reserve forward Bryon Jansen also graduated. Summers announced in March that he would leave the team, choosing to forego his senior year of college to enter the 2009 National Basketball Association draft; the Detroit Pistons selected him as the 35th pick overall. Sophomore reserve guard/forward Omar Wattad announced in April that he would not return to Georgetown for his junior year, and decided at the beginning of May to transfer to the University of Tennessee at Chattanooga. Wattad became the eighth Hoya in four seasons to leave Georgetown before his college eligibility expired, the others being Summers, Jeff Green, who also entered the NBA draft after his junior year, and Vernon Macklin, Jeremiah Rivers, Octavius Spann, Marc Egerson, and Josh Thornton, all of whom transferred.

The 2008–2009 Hoyas were a relatively young and inexperienced team with only one scholarship senior that played in a conference that boasted as many as seven ranked teams, and they had 12 games against ranked opponents during the season, winning only four of them. Georgetown fell precipitously from the Top Ten early in January to a 16–15 record by the end of the season, with losses in 12 of their final 16 games and first-round exits from both the Big East tournament and the NIT. After the Hoyas defeated DePaul in the last game of the regular season and reporters asked Blue Demons head coach Jerry Wainwright about his thoughts on why the 2008–2009 Georgetown team had fallen so far so fast, he replied that the Hoyas "started with a bang and, I think, youth caught up with them."

== Roster ==
#	Name	Height	Weight (lbs.)	Position	Class	Hometown	Previous team(s)
3	DaJuan Summers	6'8"	236	F	Jr.	Baltimore, MD, US	McDonogh School
4	Chris Wright	6'1"	201	G	So.	Bowie, MD, US	St. John's College HS
5	Nikita Mescheriakov	6'8"	214	G/F	So.	Minsk, Belarus	St. John's College HS
10	Greg Monroe	6'11"	250	C	Fr.	New Orleans, LA, US	Helen Cox HS
11	Bryon Jansen	6'6"	211	F	Sr.	Kent, WA, US	Seattle Christian Schools
15	Austin Freeman	6'4"	239	G	So.	Mitchellville, MD, US	DeMatha HS
20	Jason Clark	6'2"	176	G	Fr.	Arlington, VA, US	Bishop O'Connell HS
21	Jessie Sapp	6'3"	212	G	Sr.	New York City, US	National Christian Academy (Md.)
22	Julian Vaughn	6'9"	246	F	So.	Vienna, VA, US	Oak Hill Academy; Florida State
30	Henry Sims	6'10"	226	C	Fr.	Baltimore, MD, US	Mount St. Joseph HS
31	Omar Wattad	6'4"	225	G/F	So.	Johnson City, TN, US	Science Hill HS

== 2008–09 schedule and results ==
- All times are Eastern

Date time, TV	Rank^{#}	Opponent^{#}	Result	Record	Site (attendance) city, state
Regular season
November 17, 2008*; 7:30 p.m., MASN	No. 22	Jacksonville	W 71–62	1–0	Verizon Center (10,253); Washington, DC
November 22, 2008*; 1:00 pm, none	No. 22	Drexel	W 81–53	2–0	Verizon Center (11,434); Washington, DC
November 27, 2008*; 2:00 pm, ESPN2	No. 21	vs. Wichita State; Old Spice Classic First Round	W 58–50	3–0	The Milk House (3,357); Lake Buena Vista, FL
November 28, 2008*; 1:00 pm, ESPN	No. 21	vs. No. 12 Tennessee; Old Spice Classic Semi-final	L 78–90	3–1	The Milk House (3,926); Lake Buena Vista, FL
November 30, 2008*; 5:30 pm, ESPN2	No. 21	vs. Maryland; Old Spice Classic 5th place	W 75–48	4–1	The Milk House (3,914); Lake Buena Vista, FL
December 6, 2008*; 1:00 pm, MASN	No. 20	American	W 73–49	5–1	Verizon Center (11,196); Washington, DC
December 8, 2008*; 7:30 pm, none	No. 19	Savannah State	W 100–38	6–1	Verizon Center (8,013); Washington, DC
December 13, 2008*; 2:00 pm, CBS	No. 19	No. 17 Memphis	W 79–70 ^{OT}	7–1	Verizon Center (15,238); Washington, D.C.
December 20, 2008*; 1:00 pm, MASN	No. 15	Mount St. Mary's	W 69–58	8–1	Verizon Center (10,364); Washington, DC
December 23, 2008*; 7:30 pm, none	No. 12	Florida International	W 76–38	9–1	Verizon Center (7,964); Washington, DC
December 29, 2008; 7:00 pm, ESPN2	No. 11	at No. 2 Connecticut; Rivalry	W 74–63	10–1 (1–0)	XL Center (16,294); Hartford, CT
January 3, 2009; 12:00 noon, ESPN	No. 11	No. 3 Pittsburgh	L 54–70	10–2 (1–1)	Verizon Center (19,397); Washington, DC
January 5, 2009; 7:00 pm, ESPN	No. 9	at No. 13 Notre Dame	L 67–73	10–3 (1–2)	Edmund P. Joyce Center (11,418); Notre Dame, IN
January 10, 2009; 1:00 pm, ESPNU	No. 9	Providence	W 82–75	11–3 (2–2)	Verizon Center (12,764); Washington, DC
January 14, 2009; 7:30 pm, ESPN2	No. 13	No. 8 Syracuse; Rivalry	W 88–74	12–3 (3–2)	Verizon Center (19,227); Washington, DC
January 17, 2009*; 1:30 pm, CBS	No. 13	at No. 2 Duke	L 67–76	12–4	Cameron Indoor Stadium (9,314); Durham, NC
January 22, 2009; 7:00 pm, ESPN	No. 12	West Virginia	L 58–75	12–5 (3–3)	Verizon Center (12,875); Washington, DC
January 25, 2009; 2:00 pm, MASN	No. 12	at Seton Hall	L 60–65	12–6 (3–4)	Prudential Center (9,800); Newark, NJ
January 28, 2009; 7:30 pm, ESPN360	No. 25	at Cincinnati	L 57–65	12–7 (3–5)	Fifth Third Arena (7,265); Cincinnati, OH
January 31, 2009; 2:00 pm, MASN	No. 25	at No. 8 Marquette	L 82–94	12–8 (3–6)	Bradley Center (19,041); Milwaukee, WI
February 3, 2009; 7:00 pm, MASN		Rutgers	W 57–47	13–8 (4–6)	Verizon Center (8,473); Washington, DC
February 7, 2009; 12:00 noon, MASN		Cincinnati	L 62–64 ^{OT}	13–9 (4–7)	Verizon Center (15,349); Washington, DC
February 14, 2009; 12:00 noon, ESPN		at No. 22 Syracuse; Rivalry	L 94–98 ^{OT}	13–10 (4–8)	Carrier Dome (31,841); Syracuse, NY
February 18, 2009; 7:00 pm, MASN		at South Florida	W 65–40	14–10 (5–8)	USF Sun Dome (7,015); Tampa, FL
February 21, 2009; 2:00 pm, ESPN		No. 11 Marquette	L 72–78	14–11 (5–9)	Verizon Center (17,686); Washington, DC
February 23, 2009; 7:00 pm, ESPN		No. 6 Louisville	L 58–76	14–12 (5–10)	Verizon Center (12,653); Washington, DC
February 28, 2009; 12:00 pm, ESPN		at No. 12 Villanova	W 56–54	15–12 (6–10)	Wachovia Center (20,378); Philadelphia, PA
March 3, 2009; 7:30 pm, MASN		at St. John's	L 56–59 ^{OT}	15–13 (6–11)	Madison Square Garden (9,959); New York City
March 7, 2009; 5:00 pm, ESPNU		DePaul	W 48–40	16–13 (7–11)	Verizon Center (12,338); Washington, DC
Big East tournament
March 10, 2009; 2:00 pm, BigEast.tv		vs. St. John's; First round	L 59–64	16–14	Madison Square Garden (19,375); New York, NY
National Invitation Tournament
March 18, 2009; 9:00 pm, ESPN2		at Baylor; First round	L 72–74	16–15	Ferrell Center (8,424); Waco, TX
*Non-conference game. ^{#}Rankings from AP Poll. (#) Tournament seedings in parentheses.

== Rankings ==
Ranking movements Legend: ██ Increase in ranking ██ Decrease in ranking — = Not ranked
	Week																			
Poll	Pre	1	2	3	4	5	6	7	8	9	10	11	12	13	14	15	16	17	18	Final
AP	22	22	21	20	19	15	12	11	9	13	12	25	—							Not released
Coaches	18	18	16	18	19	13	9	8	10	12	14	23	—							

== Awards and honors ==
=== Big East Conference honors ===
Postseason honors
Honors	Player	Position	Date awarded	Ref.
Big East Rookie of the Year	Greg Monroe	C	March 10, 2009	
All-Big East Rookie Team	Greg Monroe	C	March 8, 2009	
