= 2008–09 Pittsburgh Panthers men's basketball team =

American college basketball season

2008–09 Pittsburgh Panthers men's basketball

Legends Classic Champions

NCAA tournament, Elite Eight
- Conference: Big East Conference

Ranking
- Coaches: No. 6
- AP: No. 4
- Record: 31–5 (15–3 Big East)
- Head coach: Jamie Dixon (6th season)
- Assistant coaches: Tom Herrion (2nd season); Pat Sandle (8th season); Brandin Knight (1st season)
- Home arena: Petersen Events Center (Capacity: 12,508)

2008–09 Big East men's basketball standings
	Conf.				Overall
Team	W		L	PCT	W		L	PCT
No. 1 Louisville†	16	–	2	.889	31	–	6	.838
No. 4 Pittsburgh	15	–	3	.833	31	–	5	.861
No. 5 Connecticut	15	–	3	.833	31	–	5	.861
No. 11 Villanova	13	–	5	.722	30	–	8	.789
No. 23 Marquette	12	–	6	.667	25	–	10	.714
No. 13 Syracuse	11	–	7	.611	28	–	10	.737
West Virginia	10	–	8	.556	23	–	12	.657
Providence	10	–	8	.556	19	–	14	.576
Notre Dame	8	–	10	.444	21	–	15	.583
Cincinnati	8	–	10	.444	18	–	14	.563
Seton Hall	7	–	11	.389	17	–	15	.531
Georgetown	7	–	11	.389	16	–	15	.516
St. John's	6	–	12	.333	16	–	18	.471
South Florida	4	–	14	.222	9	–	22	.290
Rutgers	2	–	16	.111	11	–	21	.344
DePaul	0	–	18	.000	9	–	24	.273
† 2009 Big East tournament winner As of April 4, 2009; Rankings from AP Poll

The 2008–09 Pittsburgh Panthers men's basketball team represented the University of Pittsburgh in the 2008–09 NCAA Division I men's basketball season. The head coach was Jamie Dixon, who was serving for his 6th year as head coach at Pittsburgh and 10th overall at the university. The team played its home games in the Petersen Events Center in Pittsburgh, Pennsylvania.

== Outlook ==
The Pittsburgh Panthers, defending Big East Conference tournament champions, came off a 27–10 (10–8) record in the 2007–08 season which included their seventh straight 20-win season, seventh straight season with 10 league wins in the Big East Conference, and a seventh straight NCAA tournament appearance. Pitt advanced to the second round of the 2008 NCAA Tournament, where they lost to Michigan State. That season also marked the seventh time in the last eight seasons that Pitt advanced to the Big East tournament Championship title game, which tied for the most appearances in league history. Pitt began the season returning three starters, each of its top three scorers, and seven of its top 10 players from the previous year. Pitt found itself ranked among the top 10 teams nationally in most preseason polls and publications. Five newcomers, including one junior college transfer and four freshman, joined Pitt for the 2008–09 season.

== Coaching staff ==
Name	Position	Year at Pittsburgh	Alma Mater (Year)
Jamie Dixon	Head coach	10th (6th as head coach)	TCU (1987)
Tom Herrion	Associate head coach	2nd	Merrimack (1989)
Pat Sandle	Assistant coach	8th	San Francisco State (1987)
Brandin Knight	Assistant coach	3rd	University of Pittsburgh (2005)
Brian Regan	Director of operations	2nd	Saint Vincent (1988)

== Roster ==
Name	#	Position	Height	Weight (lb.)	Year	Hometown	Previous school
Tyrell Biggs	5	Forward	6 ft 8 in (2.03 m)	250	Senior	Nanuet, NY	Don Bosco Prep HS
DeJuan Blair	45	Forward	6 ft 7 in (2.01 m)	265	Sophomore	Pittsburgh, PA	Schenley HS
Gilbert Brown	11	Guard/Forward	6 ft 6 in (1.98 m)	200	Sophomore (RS)	Harrisburg, PA	South Kent School
Sean Brown	14	Forward	6 ft 4 in (1.93 m)	215	Senior	Pittsburgh, PA	Canon McMillan HS
Jermaine Dixon	3	Guard	6 ft 3 in (1.91 m)	195	Junior, Transfer	Baltimore, MD	Tallahassee CC
Levance Fields	2	Guard	5 ft 10 in (1.78 m)	190	Senior	Brooklyn, NY	Xaverian HS
Tim Frye	24	Guard	6 ft 4 in (1.93 m)	200	Sophomore	Mars, PA	Mars Area HS
Ashton Gibbs	12	Guard	6 ft 2 in (1.88 m)	190	Freshman	Scotch Plains, NJ	Seton Hall Prep
Gary McGhee	52	Center	6 ft 10 in (2.08 m)	250	Sophomore	Anderson, IN	Highland H.S.
Dwight Miller	25	Forward	6 ft 8 in (2.03 m)	230	Freshman	Nassau, Bahamas	St. Pius X HS
Nasir Robinson	35	Forward	6 ft 5 in (1.96 m)	220	Freshman	Chester, PA	Chester HS
Ryan Tiesi	21	Guard	6 ft 2 in (1.88 m)	185	Sophomore	Pittsburgh, PA	North Allegheny HS
Brad Wanamaker	22	Guard	6 ft 4 in (1.93 m)	205	Sophomore	Philadelphia, PA	Roman Catholic HS
Travon Woodall	1	Guard	5 ft 11 in (1.80 m)	190	Freshman	Brooklyn, NY	St. Anthony HS
Sam Young	23	Forward	6 ft 6 in (1.98 m)	220	Senior	Clinton, MD	Hargrave Military Academy

== Schedule ==
Pitt's 2008–09 schedule included, in addition to their Big East slate, nine non-conference opponents that were ranked the previous season in the nation's top-100 Ratings Percentage Index, nine opponents that advanced to post-season play, and five that advanced to the NCAA Tournament.

Date time, TV	Rank^{#}	Opponent^{#}	Result	Record	Site (attendance) city, state
Scrimmage
Sun. Oct. 26*; 2:30 pm		Blue/Gold (Scrimmage)			Petersen Events Center (N/A); Pittsburgh, PA
Exhibition
Sun. Nov. 2*; 4:00 pm		Seton Hill	W 102–51		Petersen Events Center (6,020); Pittsburgh, PA
Sun. Nov. 9*; 1:00 pm		La Roche	W 82–30		Petersen Events Center (6,008); Pittsburgh, PA
Regular season
Fri. Nov. 14*; 7:00 pm	No. 5	Fairleigh Dickinson	W 86–63	1–0	Petersen Events Center (10,043); Pittsburgh, PA
Mon. Nov. 17*; 7:00 pm, ESPN Regional/FSN Pittsburgh	No. 6	Miami (OH)	W 82–53	2–0	Petersen Events Center (10,072); Pittsburgh, PA
Fri. Nov. 21*; 7:00 pm, ESPN Regional/FSN Pittsburgh	No. 6	Akron; Legends Classic Regional	W 86–67	3–0	Petersen Events Center (10,133); Pittsburgh, PA
Sat. Nov. 22*; 4:00 pm	No. 6	Indiana (PA); Legends Classic Regional	W 86–60	4–0	Petersen Events Center (9,003); Pittsburgh, PA
Tue. Nov. 25*; 7:00 pm, PantherVision	No. 4	Belmont	W 74–60	5–0	Petersen Events Center (9,595); Pittsburgh, PA
Fri. Nov. 28*; 7:30 pm, HDNet	No. 4	vs. Texas Tech; Legends Classic Championship Round	W 80–67	6–0	Prudential Center (3,510); Newark, NJ
Sat. Nov. 29*; 7:30 pm, HDNet	No. 4	vs. Washington State; Legends Classic Championship Game	W 57–43	7–0	Prudential Center (2,991); Newark, NJ
Wed. Dec. 3*; 7:00 pm, PantherVision	No. 3	Duquesne; The City Game	W 78–51	8–0	Petersen Events Center (10,387); Pittsburgh, PA
Sat. Dec. 6*; 7:00 pm, PantherVision	No. 3	Vermont	W 80–51	9–0	Petersen Events Center (10,122); Pittsburgh, PA
Sat. Dec. 13*; 7:00 pm, ESPN Regional/FSN Pittsburgh	No. 3	UMBC	W 91–56	10–0	Petersen Events Center (10,188); Pittsburgh, PA
Wed. Dec. 17*; 9:30 pm, ESPN2	No. 3	Siena	W 79–66	11–0	Petersen Events Center (10,045); Pittsburgh, PA
Sun. Dec. 21*; 5:30 pm, FSN National	No. 3	at Florida State	W 56–48	12–0	Donald L. Tucker Center (6,522); Tallahassee, FL
Wed. Dec. 31; 2:00 pm, ESPN Regional/FSN Pittsburgh	No. 3	at Rutgers	W 78–72	13–0 (1–0)	Louis Brown Athletic Center (6,308); Piscataway, NJ
Sat. Jan. 3; 12:00 pm, ESPN	No. 3	at No. 11 Georgetown	W 70–54	14–0 (2–0)	Verizon Center (19,397); Washington, D.C.
Sun. Jan. 11; 12:00 pm, ESPN Regional/WTAE-TV	No. 1	St. John's	W 90–67	15–0 (3–0)	Petersen Events Center (12,508); Pittsburgh, PA
Wed. Jan. 14; 7:00 pm, ESPN-U	No. 1	South Florida	W 75–62	16–0 (4–0)	Petersen Events Center (12,508); Pittsburgh, PA
Sat. Jan. 17; 6:00 pm, ESPN	No. 1	at No. 20 Louisville	L 63–69	16–1 (4–1)	Freedom Hall (20,082); Louisville, KY
Mon. Jan. 19; 7:00 pm, ESPN Big Monday	No. 4	No. 8 Syracuse	W 78–60	17–1 (5–1)	Petersen Events Center (12,508); Pittsburgh, PA
Sun. Jan. 25; 4:00 pm, ESPN Regional/FSN Pittsburgh	No. 4	at West Virginia; Backyard Brawl	W 79–67	18–1 (6–1)	WVU Coliseum (14,329); Morgantown, WV
Wed. Jan. 28; 7:00 pm, ESPN-U	No. 3	at No. 21 Villanova	L 57–67	18–2 (6–2)	Wachovia Spectrum (17,491); Philadelphia, PA
Sat. Jan. 31; 12:00 pm, ESPN	No. 3	Notre Dame	W 93–80	19–2 (7–2)	Petersen Events Center (12,508); Pittsburgh, PA
Mon. Feb. 2*; 7:00 pm, PantherVision	No. 6	Robert Morris	W 92–72	20–2	Petersen Events Center (10,122); Pittsburgh, PA
Sat. Feb. 7; 2:00 pm, ESPN Regional/FSN Pittsburgh	No. 6	at DePaul	W 92–69	21–2 (8–2)	Allstate Arena (9,814); Rosemont, IL
Mon. Feb. 9; 7:00 pm, ESPN Big Monday	No. 4	West Virginia; Backyard Brawl	W 70–59	22–2 (9–2)	Petersen Events Center (12,508); Pittsburgh, PA
Sat. Feb. 14; 4:00 pm, ESPN	No. 4	Cincinnati	W 85–69	23–2 (10–2)	Petersen Events Center (12,508); Pittsburgh, PA
Mon. Feb. 16; 7:00 pm, ESPN Big Monday	No. 4	at No. 1 Connecticut	W 76–68	24–2 (11–2)	XL Center (16,294); Hartford, CT
Sat. Feb. 21; 7:00 pm, ESPN Regional/FSN Pittsburgh	No. 4	DePaul	W 80–61	25–2 (12–2)	Petersen Events Center (12,508); Pittsburgh, PA
Tue. Feb. 24; 7:00 pm, ESPN Regional/FSN Pittsburgh	No. 1	at Providence	L 73–81	25–3 (12–3)	Dunkin Donuts Center (11,887); Providence, RI
Sat. Feb. 28; 8:30 pm, ESPN Regional/FSN Pittsburgh	No. 1	at Seton Hall	W 89–78	26–3 (13–3)	Prudential Center (9,800); Newark, NJ
Wed. Mar. 4; 7:30 pm, ESPN2	No. 3	No. 13 Marquette	W 90–75	27–3 (14–3)	Petersen Events Center (12,508); Pittsburgh, PA
Sat. Mar. 7; 12:00 pm, CBS	No. 3	No. 1 Connecticut	W 70–60	28–3 (15–3)	Petersen Events Center (12,908); Pittsburgh, PA
Postseason^{†} Big East Men's Basketball Championship
Thu. Mar. 12; 7:00 pm, ESPN	No. 2 (2)	vs. No. (7) West Virginia; Big East Championship Quarterfinals, Backyard Brawl	L 60–74	28–4	Madison Square Garden (19,375); New York City, New York
NCAA tournament
Fri. Mar. 20; 2:55 pm, CBS	No. 4 (1)	vs. No. (16) East Tennessee State; First Round	W 72–62	29–4	University of Dayton Arena (12,499); Dayton, Ohio
Sun. Mar. 22; 2:50 pm, CBS	No. 4 (1)	vs. No. (8) Oklahoma State; Second Round	W 84–76	30–4	University of Dayton Arena (12,596); Dayton, Ohio
Thu. Mar. 26; 7:27 pm, CBS	No. 4 (1)	vs. No. 20 (4) Xavier; Sweet Sixteen	W 60–55	31–4	TD Banknorth Garden (N/A); Boston, Massachusetts
Sat. Mar. 28; 7:05 pm, CBS	No. 4 (1)	vs. No. 11 (3) Villanova; Elite Eight	L 76–78	31–5	TD Banknorth Garden (18,871); Boston, Massachusetts
*Non-conference game. ^{#}Rankings from AP Poll. ^{†}Postseason ranks represent seeds in the applicable tournament. (#) Tournament seedings in parentheses. All times are in Eastern Standard Time.

== Rankings ==
Ranking movement Legend: ██ Improvement in ranking. ██ Decrease in ranking.
Poll	Pre	Wk 1	Wk 2	Wk 3	Wk 4	Wk 5	Wk 6	Wk 7	Wk 8	Wk 9	Wk 10	Wk 11	Wk 12	Wk 13	Wk 14	Wk 15	Wk 16	WK 17	Wk 18	Final
AP	5	6	4	3	3	3	3	3	1	1	4	3	6	4	4	1	3	2	4	n/a
Coaches	6	6	4	3	3	3	3	3	1	1	4	3	5	4	4	1	4	2	4	6

== Accomplishments ==
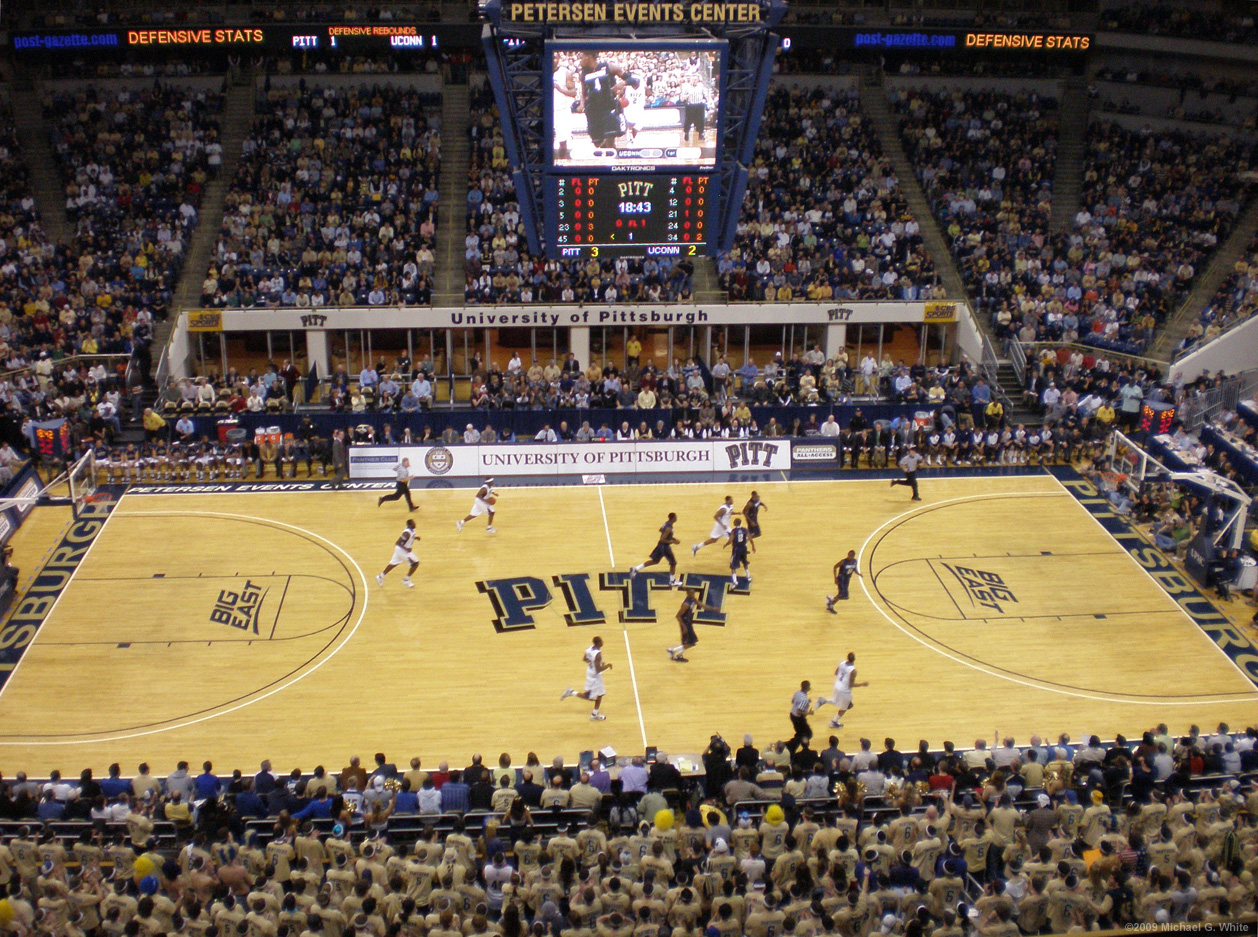
The early minutes of a game against number-one-ranked UConn on March 7, 2009, at the Petersen Events Center. A portion of the Oakland Zoo can be seen at the bottom. Pitt won the nationally televised game 70–60.

- During the 8th week of the season, the Panthers were ranked No. 1 in both the AP and Coaches poll. This was the first time in program history that the basketball team held the top ranking in either poll.
- The Panthers were named the champion of the 2nd Annual Legends Classic Tournament. Sam Young was named the tournament MVP.
- Pitt won their first and second game in their history over a team ranked No. 1 in the AP or Coaches poll when they defeated number one ranked Connecticut 76–68 in Hartford on February 16, 2009, and again defeated the top-ranked Huskies 70–60 at home on March 7, 2009.
- Pitt won the most regular-season conference games in school history (15) and achieved their best-ever regular-season record in Big East Conference play (15–3, 0.833).
- Panther center DeJuan Blair was named Big East Player of the Year, an award he shared with UConn center Hasheem Thabeet.
- Pitt received its record eighth straight bid to the NCAA tournament and its record ninth straight post-season national tournament bid.
- Pitt received its first-ever number-one seed in the NCAA tournament.
- Pitt coach Jamie Dixon, with his 162nd win coming in the NCAA Tournament over Oklahoma State, broke the NCAA Division I record for most victories in the first six seasons as a head coach formerly held by North Carolina State coach Everett Case.
- Pitt reached the NCAA Sweet Sixteen for the second time in three years and the fifth time in the last eight seasons.
- Pitt tied a school record set in 2003–04 for the most wins in a season, with 31 victories, and won 30 games for only the second time in school history.
- Pitt's senior class of Sam Young, Levance Fields, and Tyrell Biggs won 112 games during their four-year Pitt careers, giving them the most wins of any senior class in school history.
- Pitt reached the NCAA Elite Eight for the first time since 1974. In doing so, it defeated the highest-seeded NCAA Tournament in school history (seeding began in 1979) and won three NCAA Tournament games for the first time.
- Jamie Dixon won the Naismith Men's College Basketball Coach of the Year as well as the Jim Phelan Mid-season Coach of the Year award.
