= Brian Gregory =

American basketball coach (born 1966)

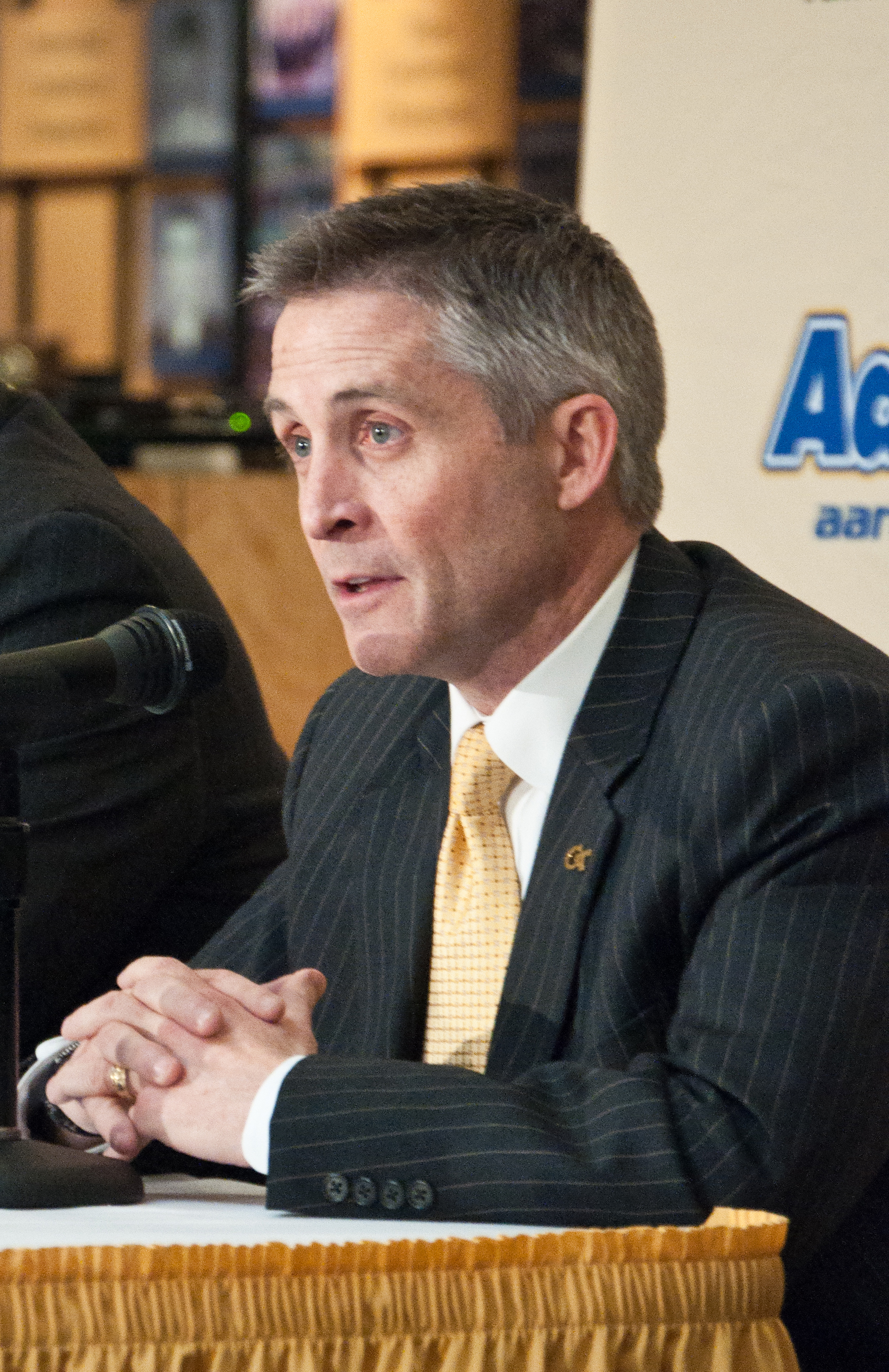
- Gregory in 2011

Phoenix Suns
- Title: General manager
- League: NBA

Personal information
- Born: December 15, 1966 (age 59) Mount Prospect, Illinois, U.S.
- Listed height: 5 ft 9 in (1.75 m)

Career information
- College: Navy (1985–1986); Oakland (1987–1990)
- Position: Point guard

Career history

Coaching
- 1990–1996: Michigan State (assistant)
- 1996–1997: Toledo (assistant)
- 1997–1999: Northwestern (assistant)
- 1999–2003: Michigan State (assistant)
- 2003–2011: Dayton
- 2011–2016: Georgia Tech
- 2017–2023: South Florida

Career highlights
- As head coach: NIT champion (2010); CBI champion (2019)

Brian Francis Gregory (born December 15, 1966) is an American basketball executive and former coach and player who is the general manager of the Phoenix Suns. He was vice president of player programming for the Phoenix Suns, and a former college basketball coach who was most recently the head men's basketball coach at South Florida. He was previously serving as a consultant to Tom Izzo at Michigan State after being let go as head coach with Georgia Tech. Prior to coaching at Georgia Tech, he was the head coach at Dayton and an assistant coach under Izzo at Michigan State.

== Early life and education ==
From 1985 to 1986, Gregory attended the U.S. Naval Academy where he played on the Navy team that featured David Robinson and advanced to the Elite Eight of the NCAA tournament. He then went to Oakland University where he was a three-time all conference selection and in 1990 was named an Academic All-American. In 1990, Gregory graduated from Oakland University with a Bachelor of Arts in secondary education. He went on to earn a Master of Arts in athletic administration at Michigan State, graduating in 1992.

== Coaching career ==
=== Michigan State ===
Gregory was an assistant at Michigan State for five years, from 1999 to 2003, under head coach Tom Izzo. During that time, the Spartans reached the Final Four three times and won the 2000 national title.

=== Dayton ===
On April 9, 2003, Gregory was named the head basketball coach of the Dayton Flyers. As Flyers head coach, he led the team to the 2004 and the 2009 NCAA tournaments as well as the 2008 National Invitation Tournament. On January 14, 2008, Gregory led the Dayton Flyers to a top-14 ranking in the AP poll. This was the highest ranking for Dayton in 40 years.

He capped off the 2009–10 season by leading the Flyers to the 2010 NIT championship over North Carolina. Gregory had a 172–94 record with the Flyers over eight seasons and NCAA Tournament appearances.

=== Georgia Tech ===
On March 28, 2011, it was announced that Gregory would become the 13th head coach at Georgia Tech replacing Paul Hewitt. Gregory struggled at Georgia Tech, only finishing above .500 two times.

He failed to make a postseason appearance in his first four years at Georgia Tech. On March 16, 2015, Georgia Tech announced that Gregory would continue as head basketball coach for another year, despite the fact he never had a conference finish higher than ninth. In the 2015–16 season, Georgia Tech improved, finishing the season 21–15 and did receive a bid to the National Invitation Tournament, their first postseason trip under Gregory. The Yellow Jackets won two games before losing in the quarterfinals.

After a 5th consecutive losing record in the ACC, Georgia Tech Athletic Director Mike Bobinski announced on March 25, 2016, that Gregory would not return for the 2016–17 season. His record was 76–86 overall and 27–61 in ACC play.

=== Michigan State ===
Gregory served as a consultant to his old head coach Tom Izzo at Michigan State during the 2016–17 season.

=== South Florida ===
On March 14, 2017, Gregory was hired as head coach at South Florida to replace Orlando Antigua.

USF went 10–22 in Gregory's first season, which was the first time the program posted ten wins since the 2014–15 season—the first of the Antigua era. It posted a 7–11 record at the Yuengling Center (formerly the USF Sun Dome), but struggled away from home, collecting just three wins away from Tampa. The Bulls finished 3–15 in AAC play, last in the conference and was a first-round exit in the 2018 conference tournament.

Gregory welcomed nine new players to the program for the 2018–19 season. USF also was benefitted by Gardner–Webb transfer Laquincy Rideau, who came off a redshirt season in 2017–18 and Alexis Yetna's addition to the hardwood. It started the season 10–2 through non-conference play before going 8–10 in AAC play. Under Gregory's eye, Rideau earned an AAC Defensive Player of the Year honor, while Yetna was named the league's Freshman of the Year for their efforts during the regular season.

Although it was bounced in the first round of the conference tournament yet again, this time by UConn, USF received a bid to play in the College Basketball Invitational, the third tier postseason college basketball tournament.

The Bulls came back from a 25-point deficit to defeat Stony Brook in the first round before defeating Utah Valley and Loyola Marymount to reach the CBI finals.

In a three-game series against DePaul, the Bulls took two-of-three (63–61, 96–100 OT, 77–65) to win the tournament. Sophomore guard David Collins was named as the tournament's MVP. In the process, USF finished 24–14 and had the largest improvement among NCAA Division I teams.

Three Bulls—Rideau, Collins and Yetna—were named preseason all-conference selections before the 2019–20 season. Yetna, who had battled a leg injury and rehabbed over the previous summer, suffered a devastating knee injury in practice prior to the team's season opening game against Arkansas–Pine Bluff and was ruled out for the season. Former LSU transfer Mayan Kiir left the team as well, turning the Bulls into one of the largest teams in the AAC to one of the smallest teams in the conference. As a result, the Bulls struggled offensively and failed to reach 70 points in 24 in 31 of their games. However, USF was extremely strong on the defensive side of the court, ranking 20th in the NCAA in scoring defense (62.7 PPG), while holding 27 of its 31 opponents under their season scoring average at the time of play.

USF failed to put together a second straight winning season under Gregory, going 14–17 and 7–11 in AAC play. The Bulls were slated to play War on I-4 rival UCF in the first round of the conference tournament before the conference announced the cancelation of the game due to the COVID-19 pandemic, just 65 minutes before tipoff between the Bulls and Knights.

Over the extended break caused by the coronavirus, the Bulls added length and saw the return of Yetna to the starting rotation. Former Mississippi State power forward Prince Oduro and Texas Tech center Russel Tchewa joined the squad and the Bulls brought in consensus four-star combo guard Caleb Murphy to bolster a team that just lost two seniors and one outgoing transfer. USF was picked to finish 5th in the AAC in the 2020–21 season.

Gregory won his 300th career game as a head coach on December 12, 2020, against Wofford.

It was announced, on January 4, 2022, that Gregory's contract would be extended until the 2025–26 season, as a part of 14 overall head coach extensions executed by USF Vice President of Athletics Michael Kelly.

After enduring a fourth straight losing season, on March 10, 2023, Gregory was relieved of his duties as South Florida head coach.

== Executive career ==
On June 10, 2024, Gregory was hired as the Phoenix Suns' vice president of player programming, joining former Long Island Nets general manager and Brooklyn Nets vice president of strategy Matt Tellem as the newest front office hirings. He would join the team that's currently owned by Mat Ishbia, a player he had previously worked with while as an assistant coach for Michigan State University during their 1999–2000 NCAA championship season run. On May 1, 2025, Gregory was named the general manager of the Suns.

== Head coaching record ==
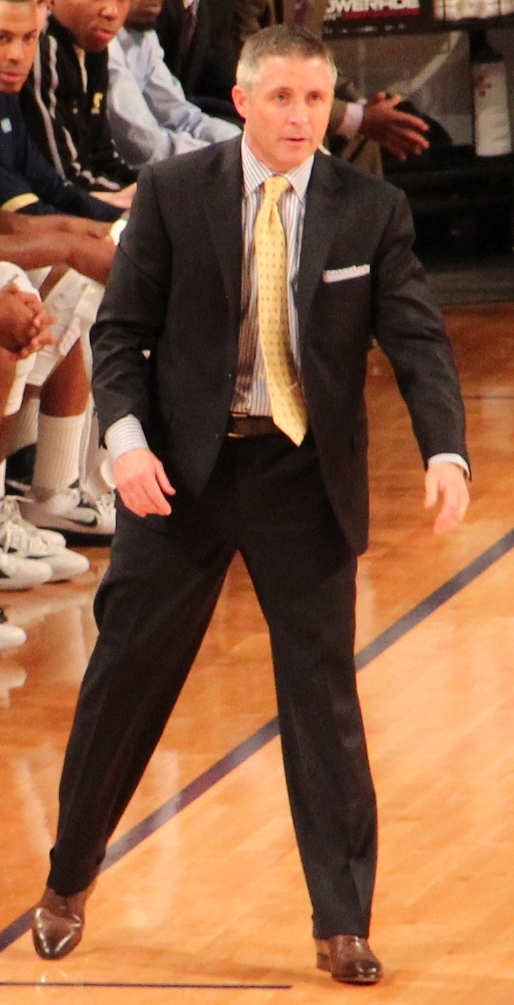
Gregory coaching at Georgia Tech, 2012

Record table
Season	Team	Overall	Conference	Standing	Postseason
Dayton Flyers (Atlantic 10 Conference) (2003–2011)
2003–04	Dayton	24–9	12–4	1st (West)	NCAA Division I First Round
2004–05	Dayton	18–11	10–6	T–2nd (West)	
2005–06	Dayton	14–17	6–10	T–11th	
2006–07	Dayton	19–12	8–8	T–7th	
2007–08	Dayton	23–11	8–8	T–7th	NIT Quarterfinal
2008–09	Dayton	27–8	11–5	T–2nd	NCAA Division I Second Round
2009–10	Dayton	25–12	8–8	7th	NIT Champions
2010–11	Dayton	22–14	7–9	T–8th	NIT First Round
Dayton:		172–94 (.647)	70–58 (.547)		
Georgia Tech Yellow Jackets (Atlantic Coast Conference) (2011–2016)
2011–12	Georgia Tech	11–20	4–12	11th	
2012–13	Georgia Tech	16–15	6–12	9th	
2013–14	Georgia Tech	16–17	6–12	11th	
2014–15	Georgia Tech	12–19	3–15	14th	
2015–16	Georgia Tech	21–15	8–10	T–11th	NIT Quarterfinal
Georgia Tech:		76–86 (.469)	27–61 (.307)		
South Florida Bulls (American Athletic Conference) (2017–2023)
2017–18	South Florida	10–22	3–15	12th	
2018–19	South Florida	24–14	8–10	T–7th	CBI Champions
2019–20	South Florida	14–17	7–11	T–7th	
2020–21	South Florida	9–13	4–10	T–8th	
2021–22	South Florida	8–23	3–15	11th	
2022–23	South Florida	14–18	7–11	8th	
South Florida:		79–107 (.425)	33–72 (.314)		
Total:		327–287 (.533)			
National champion Postseason invitational champion Conference regular season champion Conference regular season and conference tournament champion Division regular season champion Division regular season and conference tournament champion Conference tournament champion
