= 2008–09 South Florida Bulls men's basketball team =

American college basketball season

2008–09 South Florida Bulls men's basketball
- Conference: Big East
- Record: 9–22 (4–14 Big East)
- Head coach: Stan Heath
- Home arena: USF Sun Dome

2008–09 Big East men's basketball standings
	Conf.				Overall
Team	W		L	PCT	W		L	PCT
No. 1 Louisville†	16	–	2	.889	31	–	6	.838
No. 4 Pittsburgh	15	–	3	.833	31	–	5	.861
No. 5 Connecticut	15	–	3	.833	31	–	5	.861
No. 11 Villanova	13	–	5	.722	30	–	8	.789
No. 23 Marquette	12	–	6	.667	25	–	10	.714
No. 13 Syracuse	11	–	7	.611	28	–	10	.737
West Virginia	10	–	8	.556	23	–	12	.657
Providence	10	–	8	.556	19	–	14	.576
Notre Dame	8	–	10	.444	21	–	15	.583
Cincinnati	8	–	10	.444	18	–	14	.563
Seton Hall	7	–	11	.389	17	–	15	.531
Georgetown	7	–	11	.389	16	–	15	.516
St. John's	6	–	12	.333	16	–	18	.471
South Florida	4	–	14	.222	9	–	22	.290
Rutgers	2	–	16	.111	11	–	21	.344
DePaul	0	–	18	.000	9	–	24	.273
† 2009 Big East tournament winner As of April 4, 2009; Rankings from AP Poll

The 2008–09 South Florida Bulls men's basketball team represented the University of South Florida Bulls in the 2008–09 NCAA Division I men's basketball season. This was the 4th season in the Big East Conference and was the 38th season in school history. The team is coached by Stan Heath in his second year at the school. USF played its home games in the USF Sun Dome. The Bulls finished the season 9–22, 4–14 in Big East play, and lost in the first round of the 2009 Big East men's basketball tournament in their first ever appearance.

== Schedule and results ==
Date time, TV	Rank^{#}	Opponent^{#}	Result	Record	Site city, state
Exhibition
November 04, 2008*; 7:00pm		West Florida (DII)	W 80–41	1–0	USF Sun Dome; Tampa, FL
November 10*; 7:00pm		Tampa (DII)	W 79–64	2–0	USF Sun Dome; Tampa, FL
Regular Season
November 14*; 7:00pm		SMU	W 60–46	1–0	USF Sun Dome; Tampa, FL
November 19*; 7:00pm		at Virginia	L 75–77	1–1	John Paul Jones Arena; Charlottesville, VA
November 25*; 7:00pm		High Point	W 59–46	2–1	USF Sun Dome; Tampa, FL
November 29*; 7:00pm, BHSN		Northeastern	W 55–37	3–1	USF Sun Dome; Tampa, FL
December 03*; 9:00pm		at UAB	L 77–78 ^{OT}	3–2	Bartow Arena; Birmingham, AL
December 06*; 7:00pm, BHSN		at UCF; War on I-4	L 63–71	3–3	UCF Arena; Orlando, FL
December 14*; 1:00pm, BHSN		Niagara	L 55–70	3–4	USF Sun Dome; Tampa, FL
December 16*; 7:00pm, ESPN2		at Vanderbilt; SEC/Big East Invitational	L 52–71	3–5	Sommet Center; Nashville, TN
December 20*; 3:00pm		vs. Murray State; San Juan Shootout	W 73–64	4–5	Coliseo Deportivo; Toa Baja, Puerto Rico
December 21*; 5:15pm		vs. Wright State; San Juan Shootout	L 43–60	4–6	Coliseo Deportivo; Toa Baja, Puerto Rico
December 22*; 5:15pm		vs. Oral Roberts; San Juan Shootout	L 63–86	4–7	Coliseo Deportivo; Toa Baja, Puerto Rico
December 27*; 7:00pm, BHSN		Iona	W 68–55	5–7	USF Sun Dome; Tampa, FL
January 2, 2009; 8:30pm, ESPN		No. 13 Syracuse	L 54–59	5–8 (0–1)	USF Sun Dome; Tampa, FL
January 07; 7:00pm, ESPN2		No. 23 Louisville	L 57–71	5–9 (0–2)	USF Sun Dome; Tampa, FL
January 10; 2:00pm, ESPN360		at DePaul	W 80–58	6–9 (1–2)	Allstate Arena; Rosemont, IL
January 14; 7:00pm, ESPNU		at No. 1 Pittsburgh	L 62–75	6–10 (1–3)	Petersen Events Center; Pittsburgh, PA
January 17; 12:00pm, WFTS-ABC		at West Virginia	L 59–62	6–11 (1–4)	WVU Coliseum; Morgantown, WV
January 20; 9:00pm, ESPNU		DePaul	W 70–61	7–11 (2–4)	USF Sun Dome; Tampa, FL
January 24; 12:00pm, WFTS-ABC		No. 20 Villanova	L 61–70	7–12 (2–5)	USF Sun Dome; Tampa, FL
January 28; 7:00pm, BHSN		at No. 7 Louisville	L 54–80	7–13 (2–6)	Freedom Hall; Louisville, KY
February 1; 2:00pm, ESPNU		at St. John's	L 48–65	7–14 (2–7)	Carnesecca Arena; Queens, NY
February 6; 7:00pm, BHSN		No. 8 Marquette	W 57–56	8–14 (3–7)	USF Sun Dome; Tampa, FL
February 10; 7:00pm, ESPN360		Providence	L 62–77	8–15 (3–8)	USF Sun Dome; Tampa, FL
February 15; 2:00pm, WFTS-ABC		at Notre Dame	L 57–67	8–16 (3–9)	Edmund P. Joyce Center; Notre Dame, IN
February 18; 7:00pm, BHSN		Georgetown	L 40–65	8–17 (3–10)	USF Sun Dome; Tampa, FL
February 21; 2:00pm, BHSN		at No. 1 Connecticut	L 50–64	8–18 (3–11)	XL Center; Hartford, CT
February 25; 7:00pm, BHSN		at Seton Hall	L 60–75	8–19 (3–12)	Prudential Center; Newark, NJ
March 1; 4:00pm, BHSN		West Virginia	L 50–64	8–20 (3–13)	USF Sun Dome; Tampa, FL
March 3; 7:00pm, ESPNU		Cincinnati	W 70–59	9–20 (4–13)	USF Sun Dome; Tampa, FL
March 7; 2:00pm, ESPN360		at Rutgers	L 42–45	9–21 (4–14)	Louis Brown Athletic Center; Piscataway, NJ
2009 Big East men's basketball tournament
March 10; BigEast.org	(14)	vs. (11) Seton Hall; First Round	L 54–68	9–22	Madison Square Garden; New York, NY
*Non-conference game. ^{#}Rankings from AP Poll. (#) Tournament seedings in parentheses.
