= Jim Grandholm =

American basketball player (born 1960)

Personal information
- Born: October 4, 1960 (age 66) Elkhart, Indiana, U.S.
- Listed height: 7 ft 1 in (2.16 m)
- Listed weight: 235 lb (107 kg)

Career information
- High school: Elkhart Central (Elkhart, Indiana)
- College: Florida (1979–1980); South Florida (1981–1984)
- NBA draft: 1984: 4th round, 76th overall pick
- Drafted by: Washington Bullets
- Playing career: 1985–1992
- Position: Power forward
- Number: 50

Career history
- 1984–1985: Sarasota Stingers
- 1985–1986: Saint-Étienne Basket
- 1986–1987: Vevey-Riviera Basket
- 1987–1988: Dentigomma Rieti
- 1990: Corona Cremona
- 1990–1991: Dallas Mavericks
- 1991–1992: JDA Dijon
- Stats at NBA.com
- Stats at Basketball Reference

James Thomas Grandholm (born October 4, 1960) is an American former professional basketball player who played in the National Basketball Association (NBA) and other leagues.

Grandholm, a 7'0" center, played college basketball for the University of Florida from 1979 to 1980, and at the University of South Florida from 1981 to 1984. He was selected in the 1984 NBA draft by the Washington Bullets with the 76th overall pick (fourth round), but did not play in the NBA until he was 30 years old, when he joined the Dallas Mavericks in 1990–91 for one season. He played 168 minutes over 26 games, averaging three points, 1.9 rebounds per game, and made 9 of his 17 three-point shot attempts (52.9%). He signed briefly with the Orlando Magic but was waived prior to the start of the 1989–90 season.

During the late 1980s and early 1990s, Grandholm played professionally in Italy.
