= Gary Alexander (basketball) =

American basketball player (born 1969)

Personal information
- Born: November 1, 1969 (age 57) Jacksonville, Florida, U.S.
- Listed height: 6 ft 7 in (2.01 m)
- Listed weight: 240 lb (109 kg)

Career information
- High school: William M. Raines (Jacksonville, Florida)
- College: South Florida (1988–1992)
- NBA draft: 1992: undrafted
- Playing career: 1992–2006
- Position: Forward
- Number: 35, 16

Career history
- 1992: Gaiteros del Zulia
- 1992–1993: Maccabi Haifa
- 1993: Miami Heat
- 1994: Elecon Desio
- 1994: Cleveland Cavaliers
- 1994–1995: Strasbourg IG
- 1995: Estudiantes
- 1995–1996: Dragons Rhöndorf
- 1996–1997: Beşiktaş
- 1997: Breogán
- 1997–1998: Prokom Trefl Sopot
- 1998–2001: BCM Gravelines
- 2001: Cáceres
- 2001–2002: Gran Canaria
- 2002: Prokom Trefl Sopot
- 2003–2004: STB Le Havre
- 2004–2006: Chorale Roanne

Career highlights
- Israeli League Rebounding Leader (1993); First-team All-Metro Conference (1992)
- Stats at NBA.com
- Stats at Basketball Reference

Gary R. Alexander (born November 1, 1969) is an American former professional basketball player.

A 6' 7" forward born in Jacksonville, Florida, Alexander played at William M. Raines High School and the University of South Florida before having an 11-game stint in the National Basketball Association. He played for the Miami Heat and Cleveland Cavaliers during the 1993–94 season.

In 1992–93 he was the top rebounder in the Israel Basketball Premier League.

Alexander retired from basketball. He stated that basketball had served its purpose for him.
