= Curtis Kitchen =

American basketball player (born 1964)

Personal information
- Born: January 30, 1964 (age 62) Cape Coral, Florida, U.S.
- Listed height: 6 ft 9 in (2.06 m)
- Listed weight: 235 lb (107 kg)

Career information
- High school: Cape Coral (Cape Coral, Florida)
- College: South Florida (1982–1986)
- NBA draft: 1986: 6th round, 122nd overall pick
- Drafted by: Seattle SuperSonics
- Position: Power forward
- Number: 42, 12

Career history
- 1986–1987: Albany Patroons
- 1987: Seattle SuperSonics
- 1987–1992: Mulhouse
- 1992–1993: Cholet
- 1994–1996: Yakima Sun Kings

Career highlights
- LNB All-Star (1992); CBA champion (1995); CBA All-Defensive First Team (1987)
- Stats at NBA.com
- Stats at Basketball Reference
Medals
Men's basketball
Representing United States
Summer Universiade
Silver medal – second place	1985 Kobe	National team

Curtis Kitchen (born January 30, 1964) is an American former professional basketball player. He was a 6-foot-9-inch (2.06 m), 235-pound (107 kg) power forward. Born in Cape Coral, Florida, he played collegiately at the University of South Florida for four seasons (1982–1986).

Kitchen was selected with the 6th pick of the sixth round (122nd pick overall) in the 1986 NBA draft by the Seattle SuperSonics. He played for the Sonics for altogether 14 games in 1986–87 (6 games in the regular season and 8 games in playoffs), averaging 1.5 points and 1.5 rebounds per contest in the regular season.

Kitchen also played in the Continental Basketball Association (CBA) for three seasons. He played the 1986–87 season for the Albany Patroons and was selected to the CBA All-Defensive First Team. He was signed by the Sonics, then played the 1994–95 and 1995–96 seasons with the Yakima Sun Kings. He won a CBA championship with the Sun Kings in 1995. In 134 CBA games, Kitchen averaged 5.5 points and 7.7 rebounds per game.

== Career statistics ==
Legend
GP	Games played	GS	Games started	MPG	Minutes per game
FG%	Field goal percentage	3P%	3-point field goal percentage	FT%	Free throw percentage
RPG	Rebounds per game	APG	Assists per game	SPG	Steals per game
BPG	Blocks per game	PPG	Points per game	**Bold**	Career high

=== NBA ===
==== Regular season ====
Year	Team	GP	GS	MPG	FG%	3P%	FT%	RPG	APG	SPG	BPG	PPG
1986–87	Seattle	6	0	5.2	.500	.000	.750	1.5	.2	.3	.5	1.5

==== Playoffs ====
Year	Team	GP	GS	MPG	FG%	3P%	FT%	RPG	APG	SPG	BPG	PPG
1987	Seattle	8	0	2.9	.500	–	.000	.8	.0	.0	.3	.3
