= Charlie Bradley (basketball) =

American basketball player (born 1963)

Personal information
- Born: October 12, 1963 (age 62) Tampa, Florida, U.S.
- Listed height: 6 ft 6 in (1.98 m)
- Listed weight: 210 lb (95 kg)

Career information
- High school: Robinson (Tampa, Florida)
- College: South Florida (1981–1985)
- NBA draft: 1985: 3rd round, 51st overall pick
- Drafted by: Sacramento Kings
- Playing career: 1985–1994
- Position: Small forward

Career history
- 1985–1987: Granollers
- 1990–1991: Tulsa Fast Breakers
- 1991: Marinos

Career highlights
- LPB MVP (1991); Sun Belt co-Player of the Year (1983); 3× First-team All-Sun Belt (1983–1985); 3× AP Honorable mention All-American (1983–1985); No. 30 jersey retired by South Florida Bulls
- Stats at Basketball Reference

Charles Maurice Bradley (born October 12, 1963) is an American former professional basketball player who played professionally in several countries, including Spain's Liga ACB. He was a standout college player for the University of South Florida (USF), where he was the 1983 Sun Belt Conference co-Player of the Year and left as the school's all-time leading scorer and is considered the best player in school history.

== College career ==
Born and raised in Tampa, Florida, Bradley starred at Thomas Richard Robinson High School before choosing hometown South Florida over several higher-profile suitors, including Florida, his other finalist. He joined the starting lineup midway through his freshman season, and as a sophomore became one of the top scorers in the country. Over the 1982–83 season, Bradley averaged 26.7 points per game to lead the Sun Belt Conference and rank fourth in the nation. He led the nation for 11 weeks his sophomore year. At the close of the year, he was named the Sun Belt co-Player of the Year (with Calvin Duncan of VCU) as well as an honorable mention All-American by the Associated Press (AP).

Bradley's scoring numbers dipped in his junior and senior seasons, though he still averaged 22.3 and 21.7 per game respectively. He was named first-team All-Sun Belt both years and repeated as an AP honorable mention All-American as a senior. Bradley left USF holding most of the school's scoring records, including the career points mark (2,319). He became the first player in USF history to have his jersey retired on February 14, 1987 and was an inaugural member of the USF Athletic Hall of Fame in 2009. He was named to the Sun Belt All-Decade team in 1986.

== Professional career ==
Following the close of his college career, Bradley was selected by the Sacramento Kings in the third round (51st pick overall) of the 1985 NBA draft, but did not play in the National Basketball Association. He played internationally in Argentina, Spain and Venezuela before retiring from basketball in 1994. Bradley played the 1990–91 season for the Tulsa Fast Breakers of the Continental Basketball Association (CBA), averaging 9.6 points and 3.9 rebounds over 40 games.
