= 2018–19 South Florida Bulls men's basketball team =

American college basketball season

2018–19 South Florida Bulls men's basketball

CBI, Champions
- Conference: American Athletic Conference
- Record: 24–14 (8–10 AAC)
- Head coach: Brian Gregory (2nd season)
- Assistant coaches: Tom Herrion; Scott Wagers; Larry Dixon
- Home arena: Yuengling Center

2018–19 American Athletic Conference men's basketball standings
	Conf.				Overall
Team	W		L	PCT	W		L	PCT
No. 11 Houston	16	–	2	.889	33	–	4	.892
No. 22 Cincinnati †	14	–	4	.778	28	–	7	.800
Temple	13	–	5	.722	23	–	10	.697
UCF	13	–	5	.722	24	–	9	.727
Memphis	11	–	7	.611	22	–	14	.611
Wichita State	10	–	8	.556	22	–	15	.595
Tulsa	8	–	10	.444	18	–	14	.563
South Florida	8	–	10	.444	24	–	14	.632
UConn	6	–	12	.333	16	–	17	.485
SMU	6	–	12	.333	15	–	17	.469
East Carolina	3	–	15	.167	10	–	21	.323
Tulane	0	–	18	.000	4	–	27	.129
† 2019 AAC tournament winner Rankings from AP poll

The 2018–19 South Florida Bulls men's basketball team represented the University of South Florida during the 2018–19 NCAA Division I men's basketball season. The season marked the 47th basketball season for USF, the sixth as a member of the American Athletic Conference (AAC), and the second season under head coach Brian Gregory. The Bulls played home games at Yuengling Center on the university's Tampa, Florida campus. They finished the season 24–14, 8–10 in AAC play, to finish in a tie for seventh place. They lost in the first round of the AAC tournament to UConn. They were invited to the College Basketball Invitational where they defeated Stony Brook, Utah Valley, and Loyola Marymount to advance to the best-of-three finals vs DePaul. They defeated DePaul 2 games to 1 to become CBI champions.

== Previous season ==
The Bulls finished the 2017–18 season 10–22, 3–15 in AAC play, to finish in last place. As the No. 12 seed in the AAC tournament, they lost in the first round to Memphis.

== Offseason ==
=== Departures ===
Name	Number	Pos.	Height	Weight	Year	Hometown	Reason for departure
Stephan Jiggetts	0	G	6'1"	195	RS Senior	Forestville, MD	Graduated
Isaiah Manderson	1	F	6'10"	247	Senior	The Bronx, NY	Graduated
Terrence Samuel	2	G	6'3"	208	RS Senior	Brooklyn, NY	Graduated
Payton Banks	4	G/F	6'6"	223	RS Senior	Orange, CA	Graduated
Malik Martin	5	F	6'11"	214	RS Junior	Miami, FL	Transferred to Tennessee Tech
Henry Beard	14	G	6'0"	177	Sophomore	Seminole, FL	Transferred
Yito Alvarado	15	F	6'7"	206	RS Sophomore	San Juan, PR	Left team
Tulio Da Silva	21	F	6'7"	206	RS Sophomore	Formiga, Brazil	Transferred to Missouri State
Joey Coffaro	22	G	5'11"	170	Freshman	Arlington Heights, IL	Left team
Troy Holston	25	G	6'4"	200	RS Junior	Queens, NY	Transferred to Saint Joseph's

=== Incoming transfers ===
Name	Number	Pos.	Height	Weight	Year	Hometown	Previous School
Zach Dawson	2	G	6'3"	185	Sophomore	Miami, FL	Oklahoma State
Mayan Kiir	20	F	6'9"	201	Sophomore	Bradenton, FL	LSU
Antun Maricevic	34	C	6'10"	240	Junior	Zagreb, Croatia	Casper College

=== 2018 recruiting class ===
College recruiting information
Name	Hometown	School	Height	Weight	Commit date
Rashun Williams; SF	Edison, GA	Calhoun County High School	6 ft 6 in (1.98 m)	180 lb (82 kg)	Sep 4, 2017
Rashun Williams; SF	Recruit ratings: Scout: Rivals: 247Sports: (79)				
Michael Durr; C	Atlanta, GA	Oldsmar Christian School	6 ft 11 in (2.11 m)	210 lb (95 kg)	Sep 11, 2017
Michael Durr; C	Recruit ratings: Scout: Rivals: 247Sports: (79)				
Xavier Castaneda; PG	Chicago, IL	Whitney Young High School	6 ft 0 in (1.83 m)	185 lb (84 kg)	Sep 12, 2017
Xavier Castaneda; PG	Recruit ratings: Scout: Rivals: 247Sports: (78)				
Madut Akec; PF	Bradenton, FL	Victory Rock Prep	6 ft 6 in (1.98 m)	195 lb (88 kg)	Jun 4, 2018
Madut Akec; PF	Recruit ratings: Scout: Rivals: 247Sports: (NR)				
Overall recruit ranking:
Note: In many cases, Scout, Rivals, 247Sports, On3, and ESPN may conflict in their listings of height and weight.; In these cases, the average was taken. ESPN grades are on a 100-point scale.; Sources: "2018 Team Ranking". Rivals.

== Roster ==
2018–19 South Florida Bulls men's basketball team
Players
Coaches

Pos.	#	Name	Height	Weight	Year	Previous school	Hometown
G	0	David Collins	6 ft 3 in (1.91 m)	212 lb (96 kg)	So	First Love Christian Academy	Youngstown, OH
G	1	Xavier Castaneda	6 ft 0 in (1.83 m)	186 lb (84 kg)	Fr	Whitney High School	Chicago, IL
G	2	Zack Dawson (redshirt)	6 ft 3 in (1.91 m)	194 lb (88 kg)	So	Oklahoma State	Miami, FL
G	3	Laquincy Rideau	6 ft 1 in (1.85 m)	208 lb (94 kg)	RS Jr	Gardner–Webb	West Palm Beach, FL
F	4	Michael Durr	6 ft 11 in (2.11 m)	240 lb (109 kg)	Fr	Victory Rock Prep	Bradenton, FL
F	5	Rashun Williams	6 ft 6 in (1.98 m)	215 lb (98 kg)	Fr	Calhoun County High School	Edison, GA
F	10	Alexis Yetna	6 ft 8 in (2.03 m)	228 lb (103 kg)	So	Putnam Science Academy	Paris, France
G	11	Mark Calleja (W)	6 ft 2 in (1.88 m)	185 lb (84 kg)	Fr	Hudson High School	Hudson, FL
G/F	13	Justin Brown	6 ft 6 in (1.98 m)	214 lb (97 kg)	So	Hargrave Military Academy	Birmingham, AL
G	14	Ron Lubin (W)	5 ft 10 in (1.78 m)	165 lb (75 kg)	Sr	Poinciana High School	Fort Lauderdale, FL
F	20	Mayan Kiir (redshirt)	6 ft 9 in (2.06 m)	228 lb (103 kg)	So	LSU	Bradenton, FL
F	22	Madut Akec	6 ft 6 in (1.98 m)	210 lb (95 kg)	Fr	Victory Rock Prep	Bradenton, FL
G	23	T. J. Lang	6 ft 7 in (2.01 m)	208 lb (94 kg)	RS Sr	Auburn	Mobile, AL
F	34	Antun Maricevic	6 ft 10 in (2.08 m)	247 lb (112 kg)	Jr	Casper College	Zagreb, Croatia
C	41	Nikola Scekic	7 ft 2 in (2.18 m)	255 lb (116 kg)	Sr	Hutchinson CC	Belgrade, Serbia

Head coach

- Brian Gregory (Oakland)

Assistant coach(es)

- Tom Herrion (Merrimack)
- Scott Wagers (Tennessee Wesleyan)
- Larry Dixon (Johnson C. Smith)

Legend

- (C) Team captain
- (S) Suspended
- (I) Ineligible
- (W) Walk-on
- Injured
- Current redshirt

Roster
Last update: July 15, 2024

== Schedule and results ==
Date time, TV	Rank^{#}	Opponent^{#}	Result	Record	Site (attendance) city, state
Exhibition
October 30, 2018*; 7:00 p.m.		Tampa	W 80–52		Yuengling Center (1,412); Tampa, FL
Regular season
November 6, 2018*; 7:00 p.m., BullsVision		Alabama A&M	W 80–63	1–0	Yuengling Center (2,213); Tampa, FL
November 12, 2018*; 7:00 p.m., BullsVision		Austin Peay; Jamaica Classic	W 74–70 ^{OT}	2–0	Yuengling Center (2,474); Tampa, FL
November 16, 2018*; 4:30 p.m., CBSSN		vs. Ohio; Jamaica Classic	W 73–46	3–0	Montego Bay Convention Centre (1,169); Montego Bay, Jamaica
November 18, 2018*; 12:10 p.m., CBSSN		vs. Georgetown; Jamaica Classic	L 73–76 ^{OT}	3–1	Montego Bay Convention Centre (1,425); Montego Bay, Jamaica
November 21, 2018*; 7:00 p.m.		Florida A&M; Jamaica Classic	W 69–59	4–1	Yuengling Center (2,595); Tampa, FL
November 24, 2018*; 2:00 p.m., ESPN3		The Citadel	L 81–84	4–2	Yuengling Center (2,626); Tampa, FL
November 28, 2018*; 7:00 p.m., ESPN3		Stetson	W 75–71	5–2	Yuengling Center (2,415); Tampa, FL
November 30, 2018*; 8:30 p.m., ESPN3		Colgate	W 76–63	6–2	Yuengling Center (4,992); Tampa, FL
December 9, 2018*; 2:00 p.m.		at Charlotte; Canceled (winter storm)	Postponed		Dale F. Halton Arena; Charlotte, NC
December 15, 2018*; 1:00 p.m., ESPN3		Appalachian State	W 76–69	7–2	Yuengling Center (5,117); Tampa, FL
December 18, 2018*; 7:00 p.m.		at FIU	W 82–73	8–2	Ocean Bank Convocation Center (706); Miami, FL
December 21, 2018*; 7:00 p.m.		Alcorn State	W 83–44	9–2	Yuengling Center (2,329); Tampa, FL
December 29, 2018*; 1:00 p.m.		Fairleigh Dickinson	W 60–54	10–2	Yuengling Center (2,945); Tampa, FL
January 2, 2019; 8:30 p.m., CBSSN		UConn	W 76–68	11–2 (1–0)	Yuengling Center (3,429); Tampa, FL
January 5, 2019; 6:00 p.m., ESPNU		at Tulsa	L 75–78	11–3 (1–1)	Reynolds Center (4,025); Tulsa, OK
January 9, 2019; 7:00 p.m., ESPN3		Tulane	W 66–48	12–3 (2–1)	Yuengling Center (3,115); Tampa, FL
January 12, 2019; 2:00 p.m., ESPNU		at Temple; Saturday Showcase	L 80–82 ^{OT}	12–4 (2–2)	Liacouras Center (6,826); Philadelphia, PA
January 15, 2019; 7:00 p.m., ESPNews		at Cincinnati	L 74–82	12–5 (2–3)	Fifth Third Arena (10,347); Cincinnati, OH
January 19, 2019; 8:00 p.m., ESPNU		No. 21 Houston; Saturday Showcase	L 60–69	12–6 (2–4)	Yuengling Center (5,563); Tampa, FL
January 22, 2019; 8:00 p.m., CBSSN		Wichita State	W 54–41	13–6 (3–4)	Yuengling Center (3,153); Tampa, FL
January 26, 2019; 4:00 p.m., ESPNU		at East Carolina; Saturday Showcase	W 77–57	14–6 (4–4)	Williams Arena (4,610); Greenville, NC
February 2, 2019; 12:00 p.m., ESPNU		Memphis	W 84–78	15–6 (5–4)	Yuengling Center (4,573); Tampa, FL
February 7, 2019; 9:00 p.m., ESPNU		at SMU	W 67–66	16–6 (6–4)	Moody Coliseum (5,677); Dallas, TX
February 10, 2019; 5:30 p.m., ESPN3		East Carolina	W 72–68	17–6 (7–4)	Yuengling Center (5,707); Tampa, FL
February 13, 2019; 7:00 p.m., ESPNews		at UCF; War on I-4	L 65–78	17–7 (7–5)	CFE Arena (4,719); Orlando, FL
February 16, 2019; 6:00 p.m., ESPNU		Temple	L 69–70 ^{OT}	17–8 (7–6)	Yuengling Center (4,898); Tampa, FL
February 19, 2019*; 6:00 p.m.		Florida College	W 95–54	18–8	Yuengling Center (1,060); Tampa, FL
February 23, 2019; 7:00 p.m., ESPN2		at No. 9 Houston	L 59–71	18–9 (7–7)	Fertitta Center (7,039); Houston, TX
February 27, 2019; 7:00 p.m., ESPNews		UCF; War on I-4	L 63–75	18–10 (7–8)	Yuengling Center (7,231); Tampa, FL
March 3, 2019; 12:00 p.m., CBSSN		at UConn	L 58–60	18–11 (7–9)	Harry A. Gampel Pavilion (9,034); Storrs, CT
March 6, 2019; 8:00 p.m., ESPN3		at Tulane	W 75–70	19–11 (8–9)	Devlin Fieldhouse (1,020); New Orleans, LA
March 10, 2019; 4:00 p.m., ESPNU		SMU	L 71–77	19–12 (8–10)	Yuengling Center (3,548); Tampa, FL
AAC tournament
March 14, 2019; 1:00 p.m., ESPNU	(8)	vs. (9) UConn; First round	L 73–80	19–13	FedEx Forum (8,046); Memphis, TN
College Basketball Invitational
March 20, 2019*; 7:00 p.m., Bullvision		Stony Brook; First round	W 82–79 ^{OT}	20–13	Yuengling Center (1,705); Tampa, FL
March 25, 2019*; 7:00 pm, Bullvision		Utah Valley; Quarterfinals	W 66–57	21–13	Yuengling Center (1,679); Tampa, FL
March 28, 2019*; 7:00 pm		Loyola Marymount; Semifinals	W 56–47	22–13	Yuengling Center (1,658); Tampa, FL
April 1, 2019*; 7:00 pm, ESPNU		DePaul; Finals – game 1	W 63–61	23–13	Yuengling Center (2,375); Tampa, FL
April 3, 2019*; 8:00 pm, ESPNU		at DePaul; Finals – game 2	L 96–100 ^{OT}	23–14	McGrath–Phillips Arena (1,704); Chicago, IL
April 5, 2019*; 7:00 pm, ESPNU		at DePaul; Finals – game 3	W 77–65	24–14	McGrath–Phillips Arena (1,876); Chicago, IL
*Non-conference game. ^{#}Rankings from AP poll. (#) Tournament seedings in parentheses. All times are in Eastern.
