= 2008–09 Notre Dame Fighting Irish men's basketball team =

American college basketball season

2008–09 Notre Dame Fighting Irish men's basketball

2009 NIT, Semifinals L, 59–67
- Conference: Big East Conference (1979–2013)
- Record: 21–15 (8–10 Big East)
- Head coach: Mike Brey
- Assistant coaches: Sean Kearney; Rod Balanis; Anthony Solomon
- Home arena: Edmund P. Joyce Center

2008–09 Big East men's basketball standings
	Conf.				Overall
Team	W		L	PCT	W		L	PCT
No. 1 Louisville†	16	–	2	.889	31	–	6	.838
No. 4 Pittsburgh	15	–	3	.833	31	–	5	.861
No. 5 Connecticut	15	–	3	.833	31	–	5	.861
No. 11 Villanova	13	–	5	.722	30	–	8	.789
No. 23 Marquette	12	–	6	.667	25	–	10	.714
No. 13 Syracuse	11	–	7	.611	28	–	10	.737
West Virginia	10	–	8	.556	23	–	12	.657
Providence	10	–	8	.556	19	–	14	.576
Notre Dame	8	–	10	.444	21	–	15	.583
Cincinnati	8	–	10	.444	18	–	14	.563
Seton Hall	7	–	11	.389	17	–	15	.531
Georgetown	7	–	11	.389	16	–	15	.516
St. John's	6	–	12	.333	16	–	18	.471
South Florida	4	–	14	.222	9	–	22	.290
Rutgers	2	–	16	.111	11	–	21	.344
DePaul	0	–	18	.000	9	–	24	.273
† 2009 Big East tournament winner As of April 4, 2009; Rankings from AP Poll

The 2008–09 Notre Dame Fighting Irish men's basketball team represented the University of Notre Dame in the 2008–09 college basketball season, competing in the Big East Conference. The team was led by ninth year head coach, Mike Brey, and played their home games in the Edmund P. Joyce Center in Notre Dame, Indiana.

== Preseason ==
=== Roster changes and recruiting ===
Notre Dame lost senior forward and team captain Rob Kurz to graduation. Freshman guard Ty Proffit left Notre Dame and transferred to another school Notre Dame had two players transfer in and they will sit out this season per NCAA rules for transfer students.

- Scott Martin, a 6'8'' swingman, transferred after his freshman season at Purdue. Playing mainly off the bench, he averaged 8.5 points and 3.8 rebounds. He has three years of eligibility remaining.
- Ben Hansbrough, a 6'3'' guard, transferred after his sophomore season at Mississippi State, and will have two years of eligibility remaining. The younger brother of North Carolina superstar Tyler Hansbrough, he comes off a sophomore season in which he averaged 10.5 points, 3.8 rebounds, and 2.6 assists as a regular starter.

Notre Dame did not sign any recruits from high school for the 2008–09 class.

=== Preseason outlook ===
With returning Big East Player of The Year Luke Harangody, the Irish were picked to finish fourth in the Big East conference by the Big East coach's poll. Harangody was also a unanimous first-team all-Big East selection and was picked to repeat as player of the year. Senior point guard Kyle McAlarney also made first-team all-Big East selection. Notre Dame is also looking to keep its 37 consecutive home game win streak alive.

Notre Dame was selected as the preseason No. 9 team in the country in the USA Today/ESPN preseason coaches poll, the program's highest ever preseason ranking in that poll. The Irish also debuted at No. 9 in the AP preseason poll, the fifth time Notre Dame has been ranked in the top 10 of that poll and its first top 10 ranking since the 1980–81 season.

== Regular season ==
=== Roster ===
Name	Number	Position	Year	Home Town
Tim Abromaitis	21	F	Sophomore	Farmington, CT
Tim Andree	41	F	Junior	Colts Neck, NJ
Ryan Ayers	42	F/G	Senior	Blue Bell, PA
Ben Hansbrough	22	G	Junior	Poplar Bluff, MO
Luke Harangody	44	F	Junior	Schererville, IN
Zach Hillesland	33	F	Senior	Toledo, OH
Tory Jackson	2	G	Junior	Saginaw, MI
Tom Kopko	5	G	Sophomore	Chicago, IL
Scott Martin	14	G	Sophomore	Valparaiso, IN
Kyle McAlarney	23	G	Senior	Staten Island, NY
Tyrone Nash	1	G/F	Sophomore	Queens, NY
Jonathan Peoples	20	G	Junior	Bellwood, IL
Carleton Scott	34	F	Sophomore	San Antonio, TX
Luke Zeller	40	F/C	Senior	Washington, IN

Hansbrough and Martin are not eligible to play due to NCAA transfer rules.

=== Coaches ===
Name	Position	Year at Notre Dame	Alma Mater (Year)
Mike Brey	Head coach	9th	George Washington (1982)
Sean Kearney	Assistant head coach	9th	Scranton (1981)
Rod Balanis	Assistant coach	9th	Georgia Tech (1993)
Anthony Solomon	Assistant coach	4th *	Virginia (1987)
Martin Ingelsby	Coordinator of basketball operations	4th	Notre Dame (2001)

*Solomon returns to the staff for his fourth year after a previous stint from 2000 to 2003.

== Schedule and results ==
Date time, TV	Rank^{#}	Opponent^{#}	Result	Record	Site (attendance) city, state
Regular season
November 16, 2008*; 7:30 pm	No. 9	USC Upstate	W 94–58	1–0	Edmund P. Joyce Center (9,282); Notre Dame, IN
November 21, 2008*; 10:00 pm, FSN	No. 8	at Loyola Marymount	W 65–54	2–0	Gersten Pavilion (4,534); Los Angeles, CA
November 24, 2008*; 5:30 pm, ESPN2	No. 8	vs. Indiana; Maui Invitational First Round	W 88–50	3–0	Lahaina Civic Center (2,500); Lahaina, HI
November 25, 2008*; 7:00 pm, ESPN	No. 8	vs. No. 6 Texas; Maui Invitational Semi-Final	W 81–80	4–0	Lahaina Civic Center (2,500); Lahaina, HI
November 26, 2008*; 10:00 pm, ESPN	No. 8	vs. No. 1 North Carolina; Maui Invitational Final	L 87–102	4–1	Lahaina Civic Center (2,500); Lahaina, HI
November 30, 2008*; 2:00 pm	No. 8	Furman	W 93–61	5–1	Edmund P. Joyce Center (10,037); Notre Dame, IN
December 2, 2008*; 7:30 pm	No. 7	South Dakota	W 102–76	6–1	Edmund P. Joyce Center (9,753); Notre Dame, IN
December 6, 2008*; 4:00 pm, ESPNU	No. 7	vs. Ohio State; The Hartford Hall of Fame Showcase	L 62–67	6–2	Lucas Oil Stadium (17,007); Indianapolis, IN
December 13, 2008*; 7:00 pm	No. 12	Boston University	W 74–67	7–2	Edmund P. Joyce Center (10,515); Notre Dame, IN
December 20, 2008*; 7:00 pm	No. 12	Delaware State	W 88–50	8–2	Edmund P. Joyce Center (8,350); Notre Dame, IN
December 22, 2008*; 7:00 pm	No. 8	Savannah State	W 81–49	9–2	Edmund P. Joyce Center (8,260); Notre Dame, IN
December 31, 2008; 8:00 pm, ESPN2	No. 7	at DePaul	W 92–82	10–2 (1–0)	Allstate Arena (9,881); Rosemont, IL
January 3, 2009; 2:00 pm, ESPNU	No. 7	at St. John's	L 65–71	10–3 (1–1)	Madison Square Garden (9,807); New York, NY
January 5, 2009; 7:00 pm, ESPN	No. 13	No. 10 Georgetown	W 73–67	11–3 (2–1)	Edmund P. Joyce Center (11,418); Notre Dame, IN
January 10, 2009; 2:00 pm, Big East Network	No. 13	Seton Hall	W 88–79	12–3 (3–1)	Edmund P. Joyce Center (11,079); Notre Dame, IN
January 12, 2009; 7:00 pm, ESPN	No. 12	at No. 20 Louisville	L 87–73	12–4 (3–2)	Freedom Hall (19,865); Louisville, KY
January 17, 2009; 12:00 pm, ESPN	No. 12	at No. 8 Syracuse	L 93–74	12–5 (3–3)	Carrier Dome (30,021); Syracuse, NY
January 24, 2009; 7:00 pm, ESPN	No. 19	No. 3 Connecticut; ESPN College GameDay	L 69–61	12–6 (3–4)	Edmund P. Joyce Center (11,418); Notre Dame, IN
January 26, 2009; 7:00 pm, ESPN		No. 8 Marquette	L 71–64	12–7 (3–5)	Edmund P. Joyce Center (11,418); Notre Dame, IN
January 31, 2009; 12:00 pm, ESPN		at No. 3 Pittsburgh	L 93–80	12–8 (3–6)	Petersen Events Center (12,508); Pittsburgh, PA
February 4, 2009; 12:00 pm, Big East Network		at Cincinnati	L 93–83	12–9 (3–7)	US Bank Arena (7,692); Cincinnati, OH
February 7, 2009*; 1:00 pm, CBS		at No. 15 UCLA	L 89–63	12–10 (3–7)	Pauley Pavilion (11,492); Los Angeles, CA
February 12, 2009; 7:00 pm, ESPN		No. 5 Louisville	W 90–57	13–10 (4–7)	Edmund P. Joyce Center (11,418); Notre Dame, IN
February 15, 2009; 2:00 pm, Big East Network		South Florida	W 67–57	14–10 (5–7)	Edmund P. Joyce Center (11,418); Notre Dame, IN
February 18, 2009; 7:00 pm, ESPN2		at West Virginia	L 79–68	14–11 (5–8)	WVU Coliseum (13,126); Morgantown, WV
February 21, 2009; 12:00 pm, Big East Network		at Providence	W 103–84	15–11 (6–8)	Dunkin' Donuts Center (12,600); Providence, RI
February 25, 2009; 7:00 pm, ESPNU		Rutgers	W 70–65	16–11 (7–8)	Edmund P. Joyce Center (10,203); Notre Dame, IN
February 28, 2009; 4:00 pm, CBS		at No. 2 Connecticut	L 72–65	16–12 (7–9)	Harry A. Gampel Pavilion (10,167); Storrs, CT
March 2, 2009; 7:00 pm, ESPN		No. 11 Villanova	W 77–60	16–13 (7–10)	Edmund P. Joyce Center (11,418); Notre Dame, IN
March 6, 2009; 7:00 pm, Big East Network		St. John's	W 74–55	17–13 (8–10)	Edmund P. Joyce Center (11,028); Notre Dame, IN
Big East tournament
March 10, 2009; 7:00 pm, ESPN		vs. Rutgers	W 61–50	18–13	Madison Square Garden (19,375); New York, NY
March 11, 2009; 7:00 pm, ESPN		vs. West Virginia	L 74–62	18–14	Madison Square Garden (19,375); New York, NY
National Invitational Tournament
March 17, 2009*; 9:00 pm, ESPN		UAB	W 70–64	19–14	Edmund P. Joyce Center (2,039); Notre Dame, IN
March 19, 2009*; 7:00 pm, ESPN		New Mexico	W 70–68	20–14	Edmund P. Joyce Center (3,013); Notre Dame, IN
March 25, 2009*; 7:00 pm, ESPN		Kentucky	W 77–67	21–14	Edmund P. Joyce Center (7,636); Notre Dame, IN
March 31, 2009*; 9:00 pm, ESPN		vs. Penn State; NIT Final Four	L 59–67	21–15	Madison Square Garden (11,352); New York City
*Non-conference game. ^{#}Rankings from AP Poll. (#) Tournament seedings in parentheses.

== Rankings ==
Poll	Pre	Wk 1	Wk 2	Wk 3	Wk 4	Wk 5	Wk 6	Wk 7	Wk 8	Wk 9	Wk 10	Wk 11	Wk 12	Wk 13	Wk 14	Wk 15	Wk 16	Wk 17	Wk 18	Wk 19	Final
AP	9	8	8	7	12	12	8	7	13	NR											
Coaches	9	9	8	7	13	14	11	10	13	NR											
