= 2008–09 Syracuse Orange men's basketball team =

American college basketball season

2008–09 Syracuse Orange men's basketball

Big East tournament Runners-up

NCAA tournament, Sweet Sixteen
- Conference: Big East Conference (1979–2013)

Ranking
- Coaches: No. 12
- AP: No. 13
- Record: 28–10 (11–7 Big East)
- Head coach: Jim Boeheim
- Assistant coaches: Bernie Fine; Mike Hopkins; Rob Murphy
- Home arena: Carrier Dome

2008–09 Big East men's basketball standings
	Conf.				Overall
Team	W		L	PCT	W		L	PCT
No. 1 Louisville†	16	–	2	.889	31	–	6	.838
No. 4 Pittsburgh	15	–	3	.833	31	–	5	.861
No. 5 Connecticut	15	–	3	.833	31	–	5	.861
No. 11 Villanova	13	–	5	.722	30	–	8	.789
No. 23 Marquette	12	–	6	.667	25	–	10	.714
No. 13 Syracuse	11	–	7	.611	28	–	10	.737
West Virginia	10	–	8	.556	23	–	12	.657
Providence	10	–	8	.556	19	–	14	.576
Notre Dame	8	–	10	.444	21	–	15	.583
Cincinnati	8	–	10	.444	18	–	14	.563
Seton Hall	7	–	11	.389	17	–	15	.531
Georgetown	7	–	11	.389	16	–	15	.516
St. John's	6	–	12	.333	16	–	18	.471
South Florida	4	–	14	.222	9	–	22	.290
Rutgers	2	–	16	.111	11	–	21	.344
DePaul	0	–	18	.000	9	–	24	.273
† 2009 Big East tournament winner As of April 4, 2009; Rankings from AP Poll

The 2008–09 Syracuse Orange men's basketball team represented Syracuse University in the 2008–09 NCAA Division I men's basketball season. The head coach was Jim Boeheim, serving for his 33rd year. The team played its home games at the Carrier Dome in Syracuse, New York. Key contributors included senior Kristof Ongenaet, juniors Eric Devendorf, Arinze Onuaku, Andy Rautins and Paul Harris, sophomores Rick Jackson and Jonny Flynn and freshman Kris Joseph.

== Preseason ==
=== Roster changes ===
Syracuse lost its leading scorer from the previous season, forward Donté Greene, who declared for the 2008 NBA draft and was taken with the 28th overall pick by the Memphis Grizzlies. Greene was then traded to the Houston Rockets and again to the Sacramento Kings.

Syracuse used Greene's scholarship to add Iowa State transfer Wesley Johnson. Johnson averaged 12.4 points per game during his sophomore season with the Cyclones, but must sit out the 2008–09 season. Syracuse will also have lacrosse recruit Kevin Drew, a walk-on.

On the injury front, Syracuse returned juniors Eric Devendorf and Andy Rautins. Both had suffered season ending knee injuries in the 2007–08 season and were granted medical redshirts. However, the Orange also learned before the season started that sophomore Scoop Jardine would be out for entire season after suffering a stress fracture in his left leg.

=== Recruiting ===
Coach Boeheim was able to sign three recruits for the 2008–09 season: Kris Joseph, Mookie Jones and James Southerland. However, Southerland did not qualify with his SAT score to attend Syracuse, and returned to Notre Dame Preparatory Academy for an additional season of play.

College recruiting
Name	Hometown	School	Height	Weight	Commit date
Mookie Jones; Forward	Peekskill (NY)	Peekskill High School	6 ft 6 in (1.98 m)	190 lb (86 kg)	Oct 26, 2007
Mookie Jones; Forward	Recruit ratings: Scout: Rivals: (95)				
Kris Joseph; Forward	Washington, D.C.	Archbishop Carroll HS	6 ft 7 in (2.01 m)	190 lb (86 kg)	Oct 16, 2007
Kris Joseph; Forward	Recruit ratings: Scout: Rivals: (96)				
James Southerland; Forward	Bayside, New York	Notre Dame Preparatory School	6 ft 7 in (2.01 m)	200 lb (91 kg)	Apr 20, 2007
James Southerland; Forward	Recruit ratings: Scout: Rivals: (87)				
Overall recruit ranking:
Note: In many cases, Scout, Rivals, 247Sports, On3, and ESPN may conflict in their listings of height and weight.; In these cases, the average was taken. ESPN grades are on a 100-point scale.; Sources: "Syracuse 2008 Basketball Commitments". Rivals.; "2008 Syracuse Basketball Commits". Scout.; "ESPN". ESPN.; "Scout.com Team Recruiting Rankings". Scout.; "2008 Team Ranking". Rivals.

=== Preseason outlook ===
With returning co-Big East Rookie of The Year Jonny Flynn, the Orange was picked to finish eighth in the Big East conference by the Big East coach's poll. Flynn was also a first-team all-Big East selection. Syracuse began the season ranked No. 30 in the Associated Press poll and No. 31 in the ESPN/USA Today poll.

Although Syracuse was coming off two-straight NIT-bound seasons, and despite not having won an NCAA tournament game in four seasons, many experts picked Syracuse as a solid choice for the NCAA Tournament.

== Roster ==
=== Players ===
Syracuse Basketball; 2008–09 Roster
F/C	0	Rick Jackson	SO	Philadelphia (Neumann-Goretti)
G	1	Andy Rautins	JR	Jamesville, New York (Jamesville-Dewitt)
G	2	Justin Thomas	SR	Los Angeles, California (Loyola)
F	3	Mookie Jones	FR	Peekskill, New York (Peekskill)
F	4	Wesley Johnson	JR	Corsicana, Texas Corsicana/(Patterson School (NC)/Eldon Acad.)
G	5	Jake Presutti	SR	Belmont, New York (Genesee Valley)
G	10	Jonny Flynn	SO	Niagara, New York (Niagara Falls)
G/F	11	Paul Harris	JR	Niagara Falls, New York (Notre Dame Prep)
F	12	Kristof Ongenaet	SR	Ghent, Belgium (College Melle/Cuesta C.C.)
C	21	Arinze Onuaku	JR	Lanham, Maryland (Episcopal)
G	23	Eric Devendorf	JR	Bay City, Michigan (Oak Hill Academy)
G	24	Brandon Reese	FR	Davie, Florida (Pinehurst)
G	25	Kevin Drew	FR	South Salem, New York (John Jay Cross River)
F	32	Kris Joseph	FR	Washington, D.C. (Archbishop Carroll)
G	33	Scoop Jardine	SO	Philadelphia (Neumann-Goretti)
C	45	Sean Williams	FR	Villa Park, California (Notre Dame Prep)

=== Coaches ===
Name	Position	Year at Syracuse	Alma Mater (Year)
Jim Boeheim	Head coach	33rd	Syracuse (1966)
Bernie Fine	Associate head coach	33rd	Syracuse (1967)
Mike Hopkins	Assistant coach	13th	Syracuse (1993)
Rob Murphy	Assistant coach	5th	Central State (1996)

== Season ==
=== Season Recap ===
Syracuse plays Rutgers at the Rutgers Athletic Center in January

Syracuse started the season strong, winning the CBE Classic. In the semifinals on November 24, 2008, the Orange topped No. 17/18 Florida, 89–83. Jonny Flynn and Paul Harris led five SU players in double figures with 18 points each. In the finals on November 25, 2008, Syracuse defeated the defending champions, the No. 22/23 Kansas Jayhawks, 89–81 in overtime, to capture the CBE Classic. Jonny Flynn had 25 points, including a 3-pointer with 6.4 seconds left in regulation to send the game to overtime. Flynn was named MVP of the tournament.

But the season would hit a low point on December 15, 2008 when then-No. 11 Syracuse lost to unranked Cleveland State University 72–69 as a result of a 60-foot, buzzer-beating shot by Cleveland State's Cedric Jackson.

Syracuse would add another key non-conference win on December 20, 2008, when then-No. 11 Syracuse won a key away game against national runner-up Memphis as Syracuse's stifling zone held Memphis to just 7-for-33 shooting from 3-point land. Flynn paced the Orange with 24 points and six assists, as Syracuse was able to deal with the loss of Eric Devendorf to a suspension after he was accused of hitting a female student on Nov. 1.

Perhaps the biggest game of the season happened on March 12–13, 2009, when then-No. 18 Syracuse and No. 4 Connecticut played the longest game in Big East history, and second longest in NCAA Division I history, as Syracuse won 127–117 in six overtimes. Flynn set a new Syracuse record by playing 67 minutes.

Syracuse would be named a No. 3 seed for the NCAA Tournament and win games over Stephen F. Austin (59–44) and Arizona State (78–67) to advance to the Sweet 16. But the Orange would be halted by Blake Griffin and Oklahoma in an 84–71 loss. The loss would mark the final game for Devendorf, Flynn and Harris, who all left the team following the season for the professional ranks.

=== Big East tournament ===
Syracuse was seeded sixth and received a bye in the first round. They reached the finals of the 2009 tournament, where they were defeated by the first-seeded Louisville Cardinals, 76–66. It was their fourteenth time making the Big East tournament finals, the most for any team in the conference.

Prior to making the finals, Syracuse's performance featured a conference record six-overtime quarterfinals game (the second longest game in NCAA history) in which they defeated third-seeded Connecticut 127–117. A day later, in the semifinals, the Orange were forced into overtime again, where they defeated West Virginia 74–69 in a single extra session.

Jonny Flynn was named the tournament's most outstanding player, becoming just the fourth player in Big East tournament history to win the award as a member of the second-place team.

=== NCAA tournament ===
The Orange were seeded third in the South Region, and played fourteenth-seeded Stephen F. Austin on Friday, March 20 at American Airlines Arena in Miami, Florida. The Orange won, 59–44. They faced sixth-seeded Arizona State in the second round, winning 78–67. Their season ended in the South regional semifinals when they lost 84–71 to Oklahoma.

== Schedule ==
Date time, TV	Rank^{#}	Opponent^{#}	Result	Record	Site (attendance) city, state
Exhibition
November 3, 2008*; 7:00 pm, Time Warner		Cal State Los Angeles	W 77–56		Carrier Dome (10,257); Syracuse, New York
November 9, 2008*; 2:00 pm, Time Warner		Indiana PA	W 103–58		Carrier Dome (8,655); Syracuse, New York
Regular Season
November 16, 2008*; 6:30 pm, ESPNU		Le Moyne; CBE Classic First Round	W 85–51	1–0	Carrier Dome (16,755); Syracuse, New York
November 18, 2008*; 6:00 pm, ESPNU		Richmond; CBE Classic Second Round	W 76–71	2–0	Carrier Dome (16,260); Syracuse, New York
November 21, 2008*; 7:00 pm, Time Warner		Oakland	W 86–66	3–0	Carrier Dome (18,932); Syracuse, New York
November 24, 2008*; 6:30 pm, ESPN2		No. 17 Florida; CBE Classic Semifinal	W 89–83	4–0	Sprint Center (14,720); Kansas City, Missouri
November 25, 2008*; 9:15 pm, ESPN2		No. 22 Kansas; CBE Classic Final	W 89–81 ^{OT}	5–0	Sprint Center (16,988); Kansas City, Missouri
November 28, 2008*; 7:00 pm, Time Warner		Virginia	W 73–70	6–0	Carrier Dome (22,096); Syracuse, New York
December 1, 2008*; 7:00 pm, Time Warner	No. 16	Colgate	W 86–51	7–0	Carrier Dome (18,422); Syracuse, New York
December 3, 2008*; 7:00 pm, Time Warner	No. 16	Cornell	W 88–78	8–0	Carrier Dome (18,859); Syracuse, New York
December 13, 2008*; 12:00 pm, ESPNU	No. 13	Long Beach State	W 79–55	9–0	Carrier Dome (17,224); Syracuse, New York
December 15, 2008*; 7:00 pm, Time Warner	No. 11	Cleveland State	L 69–72	9–1	Carrier Dome (15,416); Syracuse, New York
December 17, 2008*; 7:00 pm, ESPNU	No. 11	Canisius	W 82–60	10–1	Carrier Dome (16,262); Syracuse, New York
December 20, 2008*; 6:00 pm, ESPN	No. 11	No. 23 Memphis	W 72–65	11–1	FedExForum (17,091); Memphis, Tennessee
December 22, 2008*; 7:00 pm, Time Warner	No. 17	Coppin State	W 82–71	12–1	Carrier Dome (17,214); Syracuse, New York
December 30, 2008; 7:00 pm, Big East Network	No. 13	Seton Hall	W 100–76	13–1 (1–0)	Carrier Dome (23,152); Syracuse, New York
January 2, 2009; 8:30 pm, ESPN	No. 13	at South Florida	W 59–54	14–1 (2–0)	USF Sun Dome (8,350); Tampa, Florida
January 7, 2009; 7:00 pm, Big East Network	No. 11	DePaul	W 85–68	15–1 (3–0)	Carrier Dome (17,296); Syracuse, New York
January 10, 2009; 7:30 pm, Big East Network	No. 11	at Rutgers	W 82–66	16–1 (4–0)	Louis Brown Athletic Center (8,079); Piscataway, New Jersey
January 14, 2009; 7:30 pm, ESPN2	No. 8	at No. 13 Georgetown; Rivalry	L 74–88	16–2 (4–1)	Verizon Center (19,227); Washington, D.C.
January 17, 2009; 12:00 pm, ESPN	No. 8	No. 12 Notre Dame	W 93–74	17–2 (5–1)	Carrier Dome (30,021); Syracuse, New York
January 19, 2009; 7:00 pm, ESPN	No. 8	at No. 4 Pittsburgh	L 60–78	17–3 (5–2)	Petersen Events Center (12,508); Pittsburgh
January 25, 2009; 12:00 pm, Big East Network	No. 8	No. 9 Louisville	L 57–67	17–4 (5–3)	Carrier Dome (25,721); Syracuse, New York
January 28, 2009; 7:00 pm, Big East Network	No. 15	at Providence	L 94–100	17–5 (5–4)	Dunkin' Donuts Center (10,873); Providence, Rhode Island
February 4, 2009; 7:00 pm, ESPN	No. 20	West Virginia	W 74–61	18–5 (6–4)	Carrier Dome (21,069); Syracuse, New York
February 7, 2009; 12:00 pm, ESPN	No. 20	at No. 17 Villanova	L 85–102	18–6 (6–5)	Wachovia Center (20,390); Philadelphia
February 11, 2009; 7:00 pm, ESPN	No. 23	at No. 1 Connecticut; Rivalry	L 49–63	18–7 (6–6)	Harry A. Gampel Pavilion (10,167); Storrs, Connecticut
February 14, 2009; 12:00 pm, ESPN	No. 23	Georgetown; Rivalry	W 98–94 ^{OT}	19–7 (7–6)	Carrier Dome (31,841); Syracuse, New York
February 22, 2009; 1:00 pm, CBS	No. 24	No. 12 Villanova	L 86–89	19–8 (7–7)	Carrier Dome (26,879); Syracuse, New York
February 24, 2009; 7:30 pm, Big East Network		at St. John's	W 87–58	20–8 (8–7)	Madison Square Garden (11,148); New York City
March 1, 2009; 2:00 pm, Big East Network		Cincinnati	W 87–63	21–8 (9–7)	Carrier Dome (25,139); Syracuse, New York
March 3, 2009; 9:00 pm, ESPNU	No. 25	Rutgers	W 70–40	22–8 (10–7)	Carrier Dome (21,233); Syracuse, New York
March 7, 2009; 2:00 pm, Big East Network	No. 25	at No. 13 Marquette	W 86–79 ^{OT}	23–8 (11–7)	Bradley Center (19,144); Milwaukee
Big East tournament
March 11, 2009; 9:30 pm, ESPN	No. 18	vs. Seton Hall; Second Round	W 89–74	24–8	Madison Square Garden (19,375); New York
March 12, 2009; 9:30 pm, ESPN	No. 18	vs. No. 4 Connecticut; Quarterfinals/Rivalry	W 127–117 ^{6OT}	25–8	Madison Square Garden (19,375); New York
March 13, 2009; 9:30 pm, ESPN	No. 18	vs. West Virginia; Semifinals	W 74–69 ^{OT}	26–8	Madison Square Garden (19,375); New York
March 14, 2009; 9:00 pm, ESPN	No. 18	vs. No. 5 Louisville; Finals	L 66–76	26–9	Madison Square Garden (19,375); New York
NCAA Tournament†
March 20, 2009*; 12:15 pm, CBS	No. 3-S	vs. No. 14-S Stephen F. Austin; First Round	W 59–44	27–9	American Airlines Arena (10,163); Miami
March 22, 2009*; 12:10 pm, CBS	No. 3-S	vs. No. 6-S Arizona State; Second Round	W 78–67	28–9	American Airlines Arena (10,204); Miami
March 27, 2009*; 7:30 pm, CBS	No. 3-S	vs. No. 2-S Oklahoma; Sweet Sixteen	L 71–84	28–10	FedExForum; Memphis, Tennessee
*Non-conference game. ^{#}Rankings from AP poll. †NCAA Tournament ranks are seeds in the region (E=East, M=Midwest, S=South, W=West). (#) Tournament seedings in parentheses. All times are in Eastern Standard Time.

== Rankings ==
Poll	Pre	Wk 1	Wk 2	Wk 3	Wk 4	Wk 5	Wk 6	Wk 7	Wk 8	Wk 9	Wk 10	Wk 11	Wk 12	Wk 13	Wk 14	Wk 15	Wk 16	Wk 17	Wk 18	Final
AP	30	30	27	16	13	11	17	13	11	8	8	15	20	23	24	28	25	18	13	13
Coaches	31	31	32	20	16	11	14	11	9	8	8	15	20	22	25	29	25	20	15	12
