= 2009 Big East men's basketball tournament =

- Classification: Division I
- Season: 2008–09
- Teams: 16
- Site: Madison Square Garden; New York City
- Champions: Louisville (1st title)
- Winning coach: Rick Pitino (1st title)
- MVP: Jonny Flynn (Syracuse)
- Top scorer: Eric Devendorf (Syracuse) (84 points)
- Television: ESPN

2008–09 Big East men's basketball standings
	Conf.				Overall
Team	W		L	PCT	W		L	PCT
No. 1 Louisville†	16	–	2	.889	31	–	6	.838
No. 4 Pittsburgh	15	–	3	.833	31	–	5	.861
No. 5 Connecticut	15	–	3	.833	31	–	5	.861
No. 11 Villanova	13	–	5	.722	30	–	8	.789
No. 23 Marquette	12	–	6	.667	25	–	10	.714
No. 13 Syracuse	11	–	7	.611	28	–	10	.737
West Virginia	10	–	8	.556	23	–	12	.657
Providence	10	–	8	.556	19	–	14	.576
Notre Dame	8	–	10	.444	21	–	15	.583
Cincinnati	8	–	10	.444	18	–	14	.563
Seton Hall	7	–	11	.389	17	–	15	.531
Georgetown	7	–	11	.389	16	–	15	.516
St. John's	6	–	12	.333	16	–	18	.471
South Florida	4	–	14	.222	9	–	22	.290
Rutgers	2	–	16	.111	11	–	21	.344
DePaul	0	–	18	.000	9	–	24	.273
† 2009 Big East tournament winner As of April 4, 2009; Rankings from AP Poll

The 2009 Big East men's basketball tournament, a part of the 2008–09 NCAA Division I men's basketball season, took place in March 2009 at Madison Square Garden in New York City. The Louisville Cardinals defeated the Syracuse Orange 76–66 in the tournament finals to earn the Big East tournament championship for the first time, and received the Big East Conference's automatic bid to the 2009 NCAA tournament.

This was the first Big East tournament to include all 16 of the conference's teams. The teams finishing 9 through 16 in the regular season standings played first-round games, while teams 5 through 8 received byes to the second round. The top 4 teams during the regular season received double-byes to the quarterfinals. The tournament featured a conference record six-overtime quarterfinals game (the second longest game in NCAA history) in which Syracuse defeated UConn 127–117.

== Announcers ==
=== Television ===
Network	Play-by-play announcer	Color analyst(s)
ESPN	Sean McDonough	Jay Bilas and Bill Raftery

=== Local Radio ===
Seed	Teams	Flagship station	Play-by-play announcer	Color analyst(s)
2	Pittsburgh	WBGG–AM 970	Bill Hillgrove	Dick Groat
7	West Virginia			

== Bracket ==
All times Eastern. Rankings from AP Poll.

First round Tuesday, March 10
9	Cincinnati	57
16	DePaul	67
12	Georgetown	59
13	St. John's	64
10	Notre Dame	61
15	Rutgers	50
11	Seton Hall	68
14	South Florida	54

Second round Wednesday, March 11
8	Providence	83
16	DePaul	74
5	#21 Marquette	74
13	St. John's	45
7	West Virginia	74
10	Notre Dame	62
6	#18 Syracuse	89
11	Seton Hall	74

Quarterfinals; Thursday, March 12
1	#5 Louisville	73
8	Providence	55
4	#10 Villanova	76
5	#21 Marquette	75
2	#2 Pittsburgh	60
7	West Virginia	74
3	#3 Connecticut	117
6	#18 Syracuse	127^{6OT}

Semifinals; Friday, March 13
1	#5 Louisville	69
4	#10 Villanova	55
7	West Virginia	69
6	#18 Syracuse	74^{OT}

Final; Saturday, March 14
1	#5 Louisville	76
6	#18 Syracuse	66

== Results ==
=== Quarterfinals ===
ESPN

Thursday, March 12
7:00 pm

#7 West Virginia Mountaineers 74, #2 Pittsburgh Panthers 60
Pts: – 20; Rebs: – 7 Asts: – 4	Pts: S. Young – 15; Rebs: L. Fields – 6 Asts: L. Fields – 7 Halftime Score: West Virginia, 36–34

Madison Square Garden, New York City, New York
Attendance: 19,375
Referees: Jim Burr, Wally Rutecki, Michael Stephens

==== Syracuse vs. Connecticut ====
The quarterfinal game on Thursday, March 12 between Syracuse and Connecticut lasted for six overtime periods, the second-longest game in NCAA Division I Men's Basketball history. The record is a seven overtime game from December 21, 1981, in which Cincinnati outlasted Bradley 75–73, in a game that took place before the implementation of the shot clock. Syracuse beat Connecticut 127–117 without having the lead in any of the first five overtimes. The game tipped off at 9:36 PM ET and ended at 1:22 AM ET on Friday March 13; in the 3 hours and 46 minutes it took to play the game, a combined total of 244 points were scored (102 of which were scored in overtime), 211 field-goals attempted (103 in overtime), 93 free throws attempted, 66 fouls committed with four players on each team fouling out.

== See also ==
- 2009 Big East women's basketball tournament
