= 2008–09 Providence Friars men's basketball team =

American college basketball season

2008–09 Providence Friars men's basketball
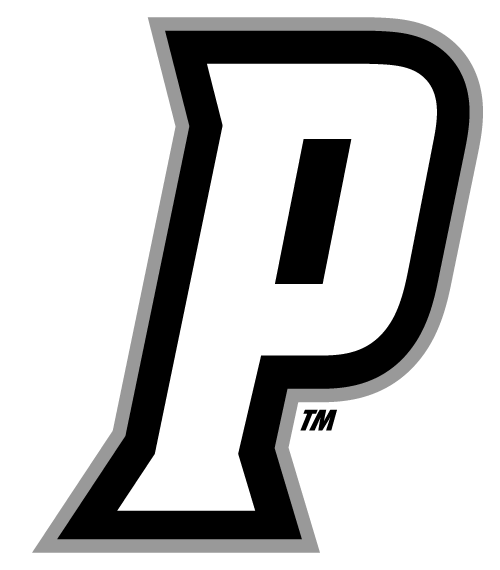

NIT, #5, 1st Round
- Conference: Big East Conference (1979–2013)
- Record: 19–14 (10–8 Big East)
- Head coach: Keno Davis
- Assistant coaches: Chris Davis; Rodell Davis; Pat Skerry
- MVP: Weyinmi Efejuku
- Home arena: Dunkin' Donuts Center

2008–09 Big East men's basketball standings
| | Conf. | | | | Overall |
| Team | W | | L | PCT | W | | L | PCT |
|---|---|---|---|---|---|---|---|---|
| No. 1 Louisville† | 16 | – | 2 | .889 | 31 | – | 6 | .838 |
| No. 4 Pittsburgh | 15 | – | 3 | .833 | 31 | – | 5 | .861 |
| No. 5 Connecticut | 15 | – | 3 | .833 | 31 | – | 5 | .861 |
| No. 11 Villanova | 13 | – | 5 | .722 | 30 | – | 8 | .789 |
| No. 23 Marquette | 12 | – | 6 | .667 | 25 | – | 10 | .714 |
| No. 13 Syracuse | 11 | – | 7 | .611 | 28 | – | 10 | .737 |
| West Virginia | 10 | – | 8 | .556 | 23 | – | 12 | .657 |
| Providence | 10 | – | 8 | .556 | 19 | – | 14 | .576 |
| Notre Dame | 8 | – | 10 | .444 | 21 | – | 15 | .583 |
| Cincinnati | 8 | – | 10 | .444 | 18 | – | 14 | .563 |
| Seton Hall | 7 | – | 11 | .389 | 17 | – | 15 | .531 |
| Georgetown | 7 | – | 11 | .389 | 16 | – | 15 | .516 |
| St. John's | 6 | – | 12 | .333 | 16 | – | 18 | .471 |
| South Florida | 4 | – | 14 | .222 | 9 | – | 22 | .290 |
| Rutgers | 2 | – | 16 | .111 | 11 | – | 21 | .344 |
| DePaul | 0 | – | 18 | .000 | 9 | – | 24 | .273 |
† 2009 Big East tournament winner As of April 4, 2009; Rankings from AP Poll

The 2008–09 Providence Friars men's basketball team represented Providence College in the Big East Conference. The team finished with a 10–8 conference record and a 19–14 record overall.

In March 2008, head coach Tim Welsh was fired by the school after finishing with a losing record for the third time in four seasons. In April, Drake University head coach Keno Davis replaced him; Davis was named the 2008 Associated Press National Coach of the Year in his first and only season as a head coach at Drake. The Friars had previously been turned down by Louisville head coach Rick Pitino, who coached Providence to the 1987 Final Four, George Mason University head coach Jim Larranaga, a Providence alumnus, and University of Massachusetts head coach Travis Ford.

Davis inherited all five starters from Welsh's final season with the Friars. However, prior to the season junior guard Dwain Williams transferred to Oregon State, while reserve forward Charles Burch was the team's lone departing senior.

At home, the Friars twice defeated ranked opponents; on January 28 they defeated #15 Syracuse, and on February 24, the Friars knocked off #1 Pittsburgh, the first time the school had accomplished the feat since 1976. The Friars received votes in the AP Poll after each win, but were not ranked at any point in the season.

Finishing with a 10-8 record in the Big East, the Friars began the 2009 Big East men's basketball tournament as an eighth seed, defeating DePaul in the first round before falling to top-seeded Louisville in the quarterfinals. They missed the NCAA tournament for a fifth straight season and lost in the first round of the NIT to Miami.

== Roster ==
2008–09 Providence Friars men's basketball team
Players
Coaches

| Pos. | # | Name | Height | Weight | Year | Previous school | Hometown |
|---|---|---|---|---|---|---|---|
| F | 0 | Alex Kellogg | 6 ft 7 in (2.01 m) | 225 lb (102 kg) | So | St. Francis DeSales High School | Columbus, Ohio |
| G | 1 | Jeff Xavier | 6 ft 1 in (1.85 m) | 185 lb (84 kg) | Sr | St. Raphael Academy | Pawtucket, Rhode Island |
| G/F | 2 | Marshon Brooks | 6 ft 5 in (1.96 m) | 190 lb (86 kg) | So | Tucker High School | Stone Mountain, Georgia |
| G | 4 | Sharaud Curry | 5 ft 10 in (1.78 m) | 170 lb (77 kg) | RS Jr | Joseph Wheeler High School | Gainesville, Georgia |
| F | 11 | Geoff McDermott | 6 ft 8 in (2.03 m) | 235 lb (107 kg) | Sr | New Rochelle High School | New Rochelle, New York |
| G | 12 | Luke Burchett (W) | 6 ft 0 in (1.83 m) | 185 lb (84 kg) | Jr | Fenwick High School | Western Springs, Illinois |
| G/F | 13 | Weyinmi Efejuku | 6 ft 5 in (1.96 m) | 210 lb (95 kg) | Sr | Brewster Academy | Fresh Meadows, New York |
| F | 15 | Jamine Peterson (redshirt) | 6 ft 6 in (1.98 m) | 225 lb (102 kg) | So | Notre Dame Prep | Brooklyn, New York |
| F | 21 | Chris Baudinet (W) | 6 ft 5 in (1.96 m) | 210 lb (95 kg) | Sr | Taft School | Watertown, Connecticut |
| G | 23 | Brian McKenzie | 6 ft 4 in (1.93 m) | 205 lb (93 kg) | Jr | Xaverian High School | Brooklyn, New York |
| F | 25 | Brian Beloin (W) | 6 ft 5 in (1.96 m) | 200 lb (91 kg) | Sr | Avon High School | Avon, Connecticut |
| F | 31 | Connor Heine (W) | 6 ft 4 in (1.93 m) | 185 lb (84 kg) | Sr | Fairfield Prep | Fairfield, Connecticut |
| F/C | 32 | Randall Hanke | 6 ft 11 in (2.11 m) | 240 lb (109 kg) | RS Sr | Trinity-Pawling School | New York, New York |
| F/C | 34 | Jonathan Kale | 6 ft 8 in (2.03 m) | 245 lb (111 kg) | Sr | St. Andrew's School | Mattapan, Massachusetts |
| F/C | 42 | Bilal Dixon (redshirt) | 6 ft 8 in (2.03 m) | 228 lb (103 kg) | Fr | Queen of Peace High School | Jersey City, New Jersey |
| C | 55 | Ray Hall (injured) | 6 ft 11 in (2.11 m) | 265 lb (120 kg) | Jr | J. K. Mullen High School | Denver, Colorado |

Head coach

Keno Davis

Assistant coach(es)

Chris Davis
Rodell Davis
Pat Skerry

Legend

- (C) Team captain
- (S) Suspended
- (I) Ineligible
- (W) Walk-on
- Injured
- Current redshirt

Roster
Last update: 2010-02-06

=== Depth chart ===
| Pos. | Starting 5 | Bench 1 | Bench 2 | Bench 3 |
|---|---|---|---|---|
| C | Jonathan Kale | Randall Hanke | Bilal Dixon (redshirt) | Ray Hall (injured) |
| PF | Geoff McDermott | Alex Kellogg | Chris Baudinet (W) | Jamine Peterson (redshirt) |
| SF | Weyinmi Efejuku | Marshon Brooks | Brian Beloin (W) | Connor Heine (W) |
| SG | Jeff Xavier | Brian McKenzie |
| PG | Sharaud Curry | Luke Burchett (W) |

=== Incoming recruits ===
College recruiting information
| Name | Hometown | School | Height | Weight | Commit date |
|---|---|---|---|---|---|
| Bilal Dixon; PF | Jersey City, NJ | Queen of Peace HS | 6 ft 9 in (2.06 m) | 229 lb (104 kg) | Sep 25, 2007 |
| Bilal Dixon; PF | Recruit ratings: Scout: Rivals: | | | | |
Overall recruit ranking:
Note: In many cases, Scout, Rivals, 247Sports, On3, and ESPN may conflict in their listings of height and weight.; In these cases, the average was taken. ESPN grades are on a 100-point scale.; Sources: "2008 Providence Signees". Rivals.; "2008 Providence Signees". Scout.; "2008 Providence Signees". ESPN.; "Scout.com Team Recruiting Rankings". Scout.; "2008 Team Ranking". Rivals.

== Schedule ==
| Date time, TV | Rank^{#} | Opponent^{#} | Result | Record | Site (attendance) city, state |
Exhibition games
| November 1*; 7:00 pm | | University of Ottawa (CIS) | W 85–57 | | Dunkin' Donuts Center; Providence, RI |
| November 8*; 7:00 pm | | Slippery Rock (D-II) | W 105–84 | | Dunkin' Donuts Center; Providence, RI |
Non-conference games
| November 15*; 7:00 pm | | Northeastern | L 66–70 | 0–1 | Dunkin' Donuts Center (8,086); Providence, RI |
| November 18*; 7:00 pm | | Dartmouth | W 100–82 | 1–1 | Dunkin' Donuts Center (4,762); Providence, RI |
| November 20*; 7:00 pm | | Sacred Heart | W 111-87 | 2–1 | Dunkin' Donuts Center (5,108); Providence, RI |
| November 22*; 2:00 pm | | Maine | W 83–62 | 3–1 | Dunkin' Donuts Center (7,060); Providence, RI |
| November 27*; 11:30 pm, ESPN2 | | vs. Baylor; 76 Classic | L 56–72 | 3–2 | Anaheim Convention Center (1,157); Anaheim, CA |
| November 28*; 10:00 pm, ESPNU | | vs. Charlotte; 76 Classic | W 67–62 | 4–2 | Anaheim Convention Center (1,417); Anaheim, CA |
| November 30*; 5:30 pm, ESPNU | | vs. St. Mary's (CA); 76 Classic | L 75–81 | 4–3 | Anaheim Convention Center (1,077); Anaheim, CA |
| December 3*; 7:00 pm | | Brown | W 86–62 | 5–3 | Dunkin' Donuts Center (6,155); Providence, RI |
| December 6*; 2:00 pm, Cox Sports | | Rhode Island | W 66–65 | 6–3 | Dunkin' Donuts Center (12,600); Providence, RI |
| December 17*; 7:00 pm | | Jackson State | W 85–71 | 7–3 | Dunkin' Donuts Center (7,158); Providence, RI |
| December 20*; 4:00 pm, NESN | | at Boston College | L 76–81 | 7–4 | Conte Forum (6,880); Chestnut Hill, MA |
| December 22*; 7:00 pm | | Bryant | W 91–64 | 8–4 | Dunkin' Donuts Center (6,103); Providence, RI |
Big East regular season
| December 31; 4:00 pm, Cox Sports | | St. John's | W 75–54 | 9–4 (1–0) | Dunkin' Donuts Center (3,037); Providence, RI |
| January 3; 7:00 pm, Cox Sports | | DePaul | W 62–54 | 10–4 (2–0) | Dunkin' Donuts Center (8,547); Providence, RI |
| January 7; 7:00 pm, ESPNU | | at Cincinnati | W 87–79 | 11–4 (3–0) | Fifth Third Arena (6,612); Cincinnati, OH |
| January 10; 1:00 pm, ESPNU | | at No. 9 Georgetown | L 75–82 | 11–5 (3–1) | Verizon Center (12,764); Washington, D.C. |
| January 17; 9:00 pm, ESPN2 | | No. 14 Marquette | L 82–91 | 11–6 (3–2) | Dunkin' Donuts Center (10,221); Providence, RI |
| January 19; 8:00 pm, Cox Sports | | Cincinnati | W 72–63 | 12–6 (4–2) | Dunkin' Donuts Center (7,285); Providence, RI |
| January 22; 7:00 pm, ESPNU | | at Seton Hall | W 98–93 ^{OT} | 13–6 (5–2) | Prudential Center (7,165); Newark, NJ |
| January 28; 7:00 pm, Cox Sports | | No. 15 Syracuse | W 100–94 | 14–6 (6–2) | Dunkin' Donuts Center (10,873); Providence, RI |
| January 31; 4:00 pm, Cox Sports | | at No. 2 Connecticut | L 61–94 | 14–7 (6–3) | Harry A. Gampel Pavilion (10,167); Storrs, CT |
| February 4; 8:00 pm, Cox Sports | | No. 17 Villanova | L 91–94 | 14–8 (6–4) | Dunkin' Donuts Center (11,212); Providence, RI |
| February 7; 4:00 pm, Cox Sports | | at West Virginia | L 59–86 | 14–9 (6–5) | WVU Coliseum (11,091); Morgantown, WV |
| February 10; 7:00 pm, ESPN360 | | at South Florida | W 77–62 | 15–9 (7–5) | USF Sun Dome (3,340); Tampa, FL |
| February 14; 7:00 pm, Cox Sports | | Rutgers | W 78–68 | 16–9 (8–5) | Dunkin' Donuts Center (11,246); Providence, RI |
| February 18; 7:30 pm, ESPN2 | | at No. 7 Louisville | L 76–94 | 16–10 (8–6) | Freedom Hall (19,484); Louisville, KY |
| February 21; 12:00 pm, Cox Sports | | Notre Dame | L 84–103 | 16–11 (8–7) | Dunkin' Donuts Center (12,600); Providence, RI |
| February 24; 7:00 pm, Cox Sports | | No. 1 Pittsburgh | W 81–73 | 17–11 (9–7) | Dunkin' Donuts Center (11,887); Providence, RI |
| March 1; 2:00 pm, ESPNU | | at Rutgers | W 73–66 | 18–11 (10–7) | Louis Brown Athletic Center (5,122); Piscataway, NJ |
| March 5; 7:00 pm, ESPN2 | | at No. 11 Villanova | L 80–97 | 18–12 (10–8) | The Pavilion (6,500); Villanova, PA |
Big East tournament
| March 11; 12:00 pm, ESPN | | vs. DePaul; First Round | W 83–74 | 19–12 (10–8) | Madison Square Garden (19,375); New York, NY |
| March 12; 12:00 pm, ESPN | | vs. No. 5 Louisville; Quarterfinals | L 55–73 | 19–13 (10–8) | Madison Square Garden (19,375); New York, NY |
NIT
| March 18*; 7:00 pm, ESPN2 | No. 5 | No. 4 Miami; First Round | L 66–78 | 19–14 (10–8) | Dunkin' Donuts Center (5,645); Providence, RI |
*Non-conference game. ^{#}Rankings from AP Poll. (#) Tournament seedings in parentheses. All times are in Eastern Time.

== Rankings ==
Ranking movement Legend: ██ Improvement in ranking. ██ Decrease in ranking.
| Poll | Pre | Wk 1 | Wk 2 | Wk 3 | Wk 4 | Wk 5 | Wk 6 | Wk 7 | Wk 8 | Wk 9 | Wk 10 | Wk 11 | Wk 12 | Wk 13 | Wk 14 | Wk 15 | Wk 16 | WK 17 | Wk 18 | Final |
|---|---|---|---|---|---|---|---|---|---|---|---|---|---|---|---|---|---|---|---|---|
| AP | | | | | | | | | | | | | RV | | | | RV | | | n/a |
| Coaches | | | | | | | | | | | | | | | | | RV | | | |

== Awards and honors ==
| Recipient | Award(s) |
|---|---|
| Marshon Brooks | 2009 Co-Coca-Cola Most Promising Prospect Award |
| Sharaud Curry | 2009 Ernie D Team Leader Award |
| Weyinmi Efejuku | 2009 All-Big East Honorable Mention; 2009 USBWA All-District 1; 2009 Jimmy Walker Most Valuable Player Award; March 2: Big East Player of the Week |
| Ray Hall | 2009 Thomas Ramos Academic Award |
| Randall Hanke | 2009 John Zannini Coaches' Award |
| Jonathan Kale | 2009 Ryan Gomes Most Improved Player Award |
| Geoff McDermott | 2009 Marvin Barnes Defensive Player Award |
| Brian McKenzie | 2009 Co-Coca-Cola Most Promising Prospect Award |
| Jeff Xavier | 2009 Lenny Wilkens Hustle Award |
