= 2008–09 Rutgers Scarlet Knights men's basketball team =

American college basketball season

2008–09 Rutgers Scarlet Knights men's basketball
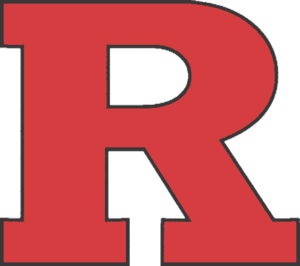
- Conference: Big East
- Record: 11–21 (2–16 Big East)
- Head coach: Fred Hill
- Assistant coaches: Craig Carter; Darren Savino
- Home arena: Louis Brown Athletic Center

2008–09 Big East men's basketball standings
	Conf.				Overall
Team	W		L	PCT	W		L	PCT
No. 1 Louisville†	16	–	2	.889	31	–	6	.838
No. 4 Pittsburgh	15	–	3	.833	31	–	5	.861
No. 5 Connecticut	15	–	3	.833	31	–	5	.861
No. 11 Villanova	13	–	5	.722	30	–	8	.789
No. 23 Marquette	12	–	6	.667	25	–	10	.714
No. 13 Syracuse	11	–	7	.611	28	–	10	.737
West Virginia	10	–	8	.556	23	–	12	.657
Providence	10	–	8	.556	19	–	14	.576
Notre Dame	8	–	10	.444	21	–	15	.583
Cincinnati	8	–	10	.444	18	–	14	.563
Seton Hall	7	–	11	.389	17	–	15	.531
Georgetown	7	–	11	.389	16	–	15	.516
St. John's	6	–	12	.333	16	–	18	.471
South Florida	4	–	14	.222	9	–	22	.290
Rutgers	2	–	16	.111	11	–	21	.344
DePaul	0	–	18	.000	9	–	24	.273
† 2009 Big East tournament winner As of April 4, 2009; Rankings from AP Poll

The 2008–09 Rutgers Scarlet Knights men's basketball team represented Rutgers University in the 2008–09 NCAA Division I men's basketball season. The head coach was Fred Hill, then in his 3rd season with the Scarlet Knights. The team played its home games in Louis Brown Athletic Center in Piscataway Township, New Jersey, and is a member of the Big East Conference. The Scarlet Knights finished 15th in the conference's regular season, and were defeated in the first round in the Big East tournament, falling to Notre Dame 61–50.

== Preseason ==
=== Recruiting ===
College recruiting information
Name	Hometown	School	Height	Weight	Commit date
Gregory Echenique; C	Guatire	St. Benedict's Prep	6 ft 8 in (2.03 m)	263 lb (119 kg)	Mar 24, 2008
Gregory Echenique; C	Recruit ratings: Scout: Rivals: (89)				
Patrick Jackson; SF	New York City, New York	Boys & Girls HS	6 ft 6 in (1.98 m)	185 lb (84 kg)	Oct 20, 2007
Patrick Jackson; SF	Recruit ratings: Scout: Rivals: (87)				
Christian Morris; C	South Kent, Connecticut	South Kent School	6 ft 9 in (2.06 m)	270 lb (120 kg)	Jul 16, 2007
Christian Morris; C	Recruit ratings: Scout: Rivals: (76)				
Mike Rosario; SG	Jersey City, New Jersey	St. Anthony HS	6 ft 2 in (1.88 m)	170 lb (77 kg)	Apr 6, 2007
Mike Rosario; SG	Recruit ratings: Scout: Rivals: (96)				
Overall recruit ranking: Scout: 19 Rivals: 30
Note: In many cases, Scout, Rivals, 247Sports, On3, and ESPN may conflict in their listings of height and weight.; In these cases, the average was taken. ESPN grades are on a 100-point scale.; Sources: "Rutgers 2008 Basketball Commitments". Rivals.; "2008 Rutgers Basketball Commits". Scout.; "Rutgers Basketball Recruiting 2008". ESPN.; "Scout.com Team Recruiting Rankings". Scout.; "2008 Team Ranking". Rivals.

== Roster ==
2008–09 Rutgers Scarlet Knights men's basketball team
Players
Coaches

Pos.	#	Name	Height	Weight	Year	Hometown
G	1	Corey Chandler	6 ft 2 in (1.88 m)	190 lb (86 kg)	So	Newark, New Jersey
G	31	Mike Coburn	6 ft 0 in (1.83 m)	195 lb (88 kg)	So	Mount Vernon, New York
F	0	Gregory Echenique	6 ft 9 in (2.06 m)	260 lb (118 kg)	Fr	Guatire Venezuela

Head coach

- Fred Hill (Montclair State)

Assistant coach(es)

- Craig Carter (Rutgers)
- Darren Savino (NJCU)

Strength and conditioning coach(es)

- Phil Dyer (UMass Boston)

Athletic trainer(s)

- Eric Bridenbaugh (Rutgers)

Legend

- (C) Team captain
- (S) Suspended
- (I) Ineligible
- (W) Walk-on
- Injured
- Current redshirt

== Schedule and results ==
Date time, TV	Rank^{#}	Opponent^{#}	Result	Record	Site (attendance) city, state
Exhibition
November 14*; 7:30 pm		Caldwell	W 91–56		RAC (2,264); Piscataway, New Jersey
Regular season
November 14*; 8:00 pm		Marist; Garden State Challenge	W 63–61	1–0	RAC (4,822); Piscataway, New Jersey
November 16*; 4:00 pm		at Delaware; Garden State Challenge	W 85–77	2–0	Bob Carpenter Center (3,381); Newark, Delaware
November 21*; 8:00 pm		Robert Morris; Garden State Challenge	W 69–55	3-0	RAC (4,752); Piscataway, New Jersey
November 23*; 2:00 pm, SNY		St. Bonaventure; Garden State Challenge	L 63–64 ^{OT}	3–1	RAC (4,018); Piscataway, New Jersey
November 26*; 7:30 pm		Lehigh	L 71–76	3–2	RAC (4,399); Piscataway, New Jersey
November 30*; 2:00 pm		Saint Peter's	W 68–47	4–2	RAC (3,864); Piscataway, New Jersey
December 3*; 7:00 pm		at Rider	W 66–62	5–2	Sovereign Bank Arena (3,126); Trenton, New Jersey
December 6*; 2:00 pm		Binghamton	L 56–66	5–3	RAC (4,076); Piscataway, New Jersey
December 10*; 7:00 pm		at Princeton; Rivalry	W 49–47	6–3	Jadwin Gymnasium (2,912); Princeton, New Jersey
December 14*; 2:00 pm		Delaware State	W 60–55	7–3	RAC (2,967); Piscataway, New Jersey
December 20*; 2:00 pm		Bryant	W 67–37	8–3	RAC (3,077); Piscataway, New Jersey
December 23*; 7:30 pm		NJIT	W 78–52	9–3	RAC (2,319); Piscataway, New Jersey
December 28*; 7:45 pm, FSN/MSG+		at No. 1 North Carolina	L 75–97	9–4	Dean Smith Center (21,750); Chapel Hill, North Carolina
December 31; 2:00 pm, MSG+/ESPN360		No. 3 Pittsburgh	L 72–78	9–5 (0–1)	RAC (6,308); Piscataway, New Jersey
January 3; 7:00 pm, SNY		at No. 2 Connecticut	L 49–80	9–6 (0–2)	Harry A. Gampel Pavilion (10,167); Storrs, Connecticut
January 7; 7:30 pm, MSG+		No. 15 Marquette	L 76–81	9–7 (0–3)	RAC (4,112); Piscataway, New Jersey
January 10; 7:30 pm, SNY		No. 11 Syracuse	L 66–82	9–8 (0–4)	RAC (8,079); Piscataway, New Jersey
January 14; 7:30 pm, SNY		at Cincinnati	L 59–71	9–9 (0–5)	Fifth Third Arena (6,723); Cincinnati
January 21; 7:00 pm, ESPNU		No. 9 Louisville	L 59–78	9–10 (0–6)	RAC (5,178); Piscataway, New Jersey
January 24; 7:00 pm, MSG+/ESPN360		at St. John's	L 59–70	9–11 (0–7)	Madison Square Garden (7,890); New York City
January 29; 9:00 pm, ESPN2/ESPN360		at Seton Hall	L 67–70	9–12 (0–8)	Prudential Center (8,390); Newark, New Jersey
January 31; 8:00 pm, ESPNU		DePaul	W 75–56	10–12 (1–8)	RAC (5,020); Piscataway, New Jersey
February 3; 7:00 pm, SNY		at Georgetown	L 47–57	10–13 (1–9)	Verizon Center (8,473); Washington, D.C.
February 8; 12:00 pm, ESPNU		Seton Hall	L 60–65	10–14 (1–10)	RAC (6,504); Piscataway, New Jersey
February 14; 7:00 pm, SNY		at Providence	L 68–78	10–15 (1–11)	Dunkin' Donuts Center (11,246); Providence, Rhode Island
February 19; 9:00 pm, ESPN2		at No. 12 Villanova	L 72–82	10–16 (1–12)	The Pavilion (6,500); Villanova, Pennsylvania
February 22; 3:00 pm, SNY		West Virginia	L 56–74	10–17 (1–13)	RAC (5,281); Piscataway, New Jersey
February 25; 7:00 pm, ESPNU		at Notre Dame	L 65–70	10–18 (1–14)	Edmund P. Joyce Center (10,203); Notre Dame, Indiana
March 1; 2:00 pm, ESPNU		Providence	L 66–73	10–19 (1–15)	RAC (5,122); Piscataway, New Jersey
March 3; 9:00 pm, ESPNU		at No. 25 Syracuse	L 40–70	10–20 (1–16)	Carrier Dome (21,233); Syracuse, New York
March 7; 2:00 pm, ESPN360		South Florida	W 45–42	11–20 (2–16)	RAC (4,114); Piscataway, New Jersey
Big East tournament
March 10; 7:00 pm, MSG		vs. Notre Dame; First Round	L 61–50	11–21	Madison Square Garden (19,375); New York City, New York
*Non-conference game. ^{#}Rankings from Coaches' Poll. (#) Tournament seedings in parentheses.
