= Weyinmi Efejuku =

Jamaican professional basketball player

Weyinmi Efejuku Rose
Mets de Guaynabo
- Position: Point guard
- League: FIBA Americas League

Personal information
- Born: September 15, 1986 (age 40) New York City, New York, U.S.
- Listed height: 1.96 m (6 ft 5 in)
- Listed weight: 95 kg (209 lb)

Career information
- High school: Brewster Academy (Wolfeboro, New Hampshire)
- College: Providence (2005–2009)
- NBA draft: 2009: undrafted
- Playing career: 2009–present

Career history
- 2009: Tenerife CB
- 2009–2010: BK Barons
- 2010: ČEZ Nymburk
- 2010–2011: Ferro-ZNTU
- 2011: Ventspils
- 2011–2012: Juvecaserta Basket
- 2012: Indios de Mayagüez
- 2012: Fuerza Regia
- 2013: Indios de Mayagüez
- 2013: Hebraica y Macabi
- 2014: Leones de Ponce
- 2015: Atenienses de Manatí
- 2016: Fuerza Guinda de Nogales
- 2020–present: Mets de Guaynabo
Medals
Men's basketball
Representing Jamaica
FIBA CBC Championship
Gold medal – first place	2009 Tortola

Weyinmi Efejuku Rose (born September 15, 1986) is a Jamaican professional basketball player who currently plays for Mets de Guaynabo of the FIBA Americas League.

He was born in New York, New York. He has played for Providence Friars men's basketball and attended Brewster Academy. Led by coach Eddie Casiano, he helped the Indios de Mayagüez win the Baloncesto Superior Nacional championship in 2012.

He was married to Taniah Baker in 2017 and they have three children.

== Awards and honors ==
2008–09 season

- 2009 All-Big East Honorable Mention
- 2009 USBWA All-District 1
- 2009 Jimmy Walker Most Valuable Player Award
- March 2: Big East Player of the Week
