= 2008–09 Marquette Golden Eagles men's basketball team =

American college basketball season

2008–09 Marquette Golden Eagles men's basketball
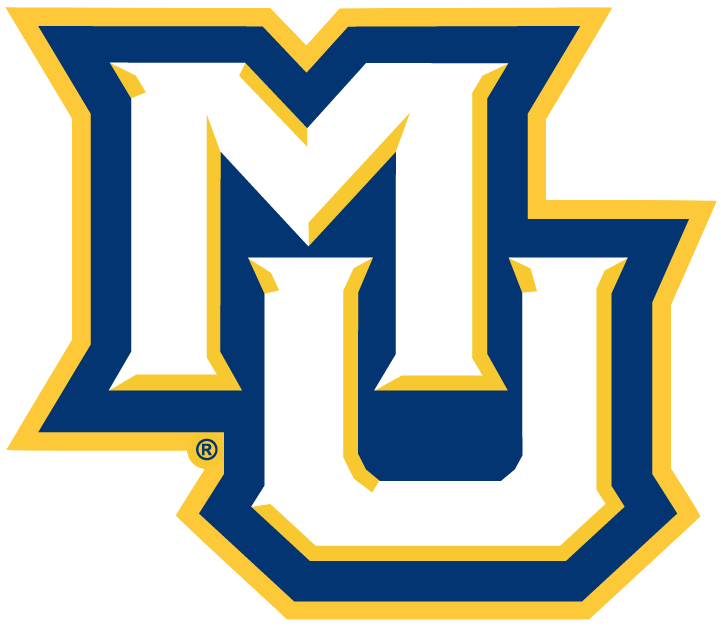

NCAA tournament, second round
- Conference: Big East Conference (1979–2013)

Ranking
- Coaches: No. 21
- AP: No. 23
- Record: 25–10 (12–6 Big East)
- Head coach: Buzz Williams (1st season)
- Assistant coaches: Tony Benford; Dale Layer; Aki Collins
- Home arena: Bradley Center

2008–09 Big East men's basketball standings
	Conf.				Overall
Team	W		L	PCT	W		L	PCT
No. 1 Louisville†	16	–	2	.889	31	–	6	.838
No. 4 Pittsburgh	15	–	3	.833	31	–	5	.861
No. 5 Connecticut	15	–	3	.833	31	–	5	.861
No. 11 Villanova	13	–	5	.722	30	–	8	.789
No. 23 Marquette	12	–	6	.667	25	–	10	.714
No. 13 Syracuse	11	–	7	.611	28	–	10	.737
West Virginia	10	–	8	.556	23	–	12	.657
Providence	10	–	8	.556	19	–	14	.576
Notre Dame	8	–	10	.444	21	–	15	.583
Cincinnati	8	–	10	.444	18	–	14	.563
Seton Hall	7	–	11	.389	17	–	15	.531
Georgetown	7	–	11	.389	16	–	15	.516
St. John's	6	–	12	.333	16	–	18	.471
South Florida	4	–	14	.222	9	–	22	.290
Rutgers	2	–	16	.111	11	–	21	.344
DePaul	0	–	18	.000	9	–	24	.273
† 2009 Big East tournament winner As of April 4, 2009; Rankings from AP Poll

The 2008–09 Marquette Golden Eagles men's basketball team represented Marquette University in the 2008–09 NCAA Division I men's basketball season. The head coach was Buzz Williams, who served his first season as head coach, and second with Marquette. The team played its home games at the Bradley Center in Milwaukee, Wisconsin. Key contributors included seniors Dominic James, Jerel McNeal, and Wesley Matthews, and juniors Lazar Hayward, Maurice Acker and Jimmy Butler.

== Roster ==
	#	Position	Height	Weight	Year	Home Town
Dominic James	1	Guard	5–11	175	Senior	Richmond, Indiana
Maurice Acker	2	Guard	5–8	165	Junior	Hazel Crest, Illinois
Patrick Hazel	4	Forward	6–7	220	Sophomore	Queens, New York
David Cubillan	10	Guard	6–0	175	Junior	Maricaibo, Venezuela
Dwight Burke	12	Forward	6–8	250	Junior	Brooklyn, New York
Joseph Fulce	21	Forward	6–7	205	Sophomore	Plano, Texas
Jerel McNeal	22	Guard	6–3	200	Senior	Chicago, Illinois
Wesley Matthews	23	Guard/Forward	6–5	215	Senior	Madison, Wisconsin
Lazar Hayward	32	Forward	6–6	225	Junior	Buffalo, New York
Jimmy Butler	33	Guard	6–6	215	Sophomore	Tomball, Texas
Chris Otule	42	Center	6–10	245	Freshman	Richmond, Texas
Robert Frozena	45	Guard	6–1	180	Sophomore	Sherwood, Wisconsin
Liam McMorrow	55	Center	7–0	260	Sophomore	Toronto, Ontario, Canada

== 2008–2009 Statistics ==
Updated as of February 19, 2009.

Player	GP	GS	MPG	FG%	3FG%	FT%	RPG	APG	SPG	BPG	PPG
Jerel McNeal	26	26	33.9	.480	.438	.727	4.7	4.0	2.2	0.7	19.9
Wesley Matthews	26	26	32.5	.529	.391	.816	5.4	2.5	1.3	0.5	18.6
Lazar Hayward	26	26	30.8	.468	.346	.821	8.5	1.3	1.0	0.3	15.9
Dominic James	26	26	32.7	.430	.283	.459	3.7	5.4	2.2	0.3	11.9
Jimmy Butler	26	1	17.0	.500	.000	.732	3.3	0.6	0.3	0.4	4.5
Dwight Burke	26	25	19.4	.657	.000	.500	3.7	0.2	0.2	0.3	2.8
Patrick Hazel	21	0	12.0	.704	.000	.588	2.1	0.0	0.3	0.4	2.3
Maurice Acker	25	0	11.7	.246	.216	.714	1.1	1.5	0.7	0.0	2.0
Joseph Fulce	8	0	6.0	.500	.000	.750	1.3	0.4	0.3	0.1	1.9
Chris Otule	7	0	7.9	.364	.000	.400	1.4	0.0	0.0	0.7	1.7
David Cubillan	23	0	9.2	.267	.300	.556	0.7	0.8	0.2	0.0	1.7
Robert Frozena	10	0	1.8	.250	.000	.500	0.7	0.0	0.0	0.0	-

== Schedule and results ==
Date time, TV	Rank^{#}	Opponent^{#}	Result	Record	Site (attendance) city, state
Non-conference games
November 14, 2008*; 7:00 pm	No. 17	Houston Baptist	W 95–64	1–0	Bradley Center (13,668); Milwaukee, WI
November 17, 2008*; 7:00 pm	No. 17	Chicago State	W 106–87	2–0	Bradley Center (12,966); Milwaukee, WI
November 22, 2008*; 7:00 pm	No. 17	Milwaukee	W 100–80	3–0	Bradley Center (15,168); Milwaukee, WI
November 25, 2008*; 7:00 pm	No. 15	Texas Southern	W 85–68	4–0	Bradley Center (12,993); Milwaukee, WI
November 28, 2008*; 7:00 pm	No. 15	vs. Northern Iowa; Chicago Invitational Challenge	W 73–43	5–0	Sears Centre (3,087); Hoffman Estates, IL
November 29, 2008*; 7:00 pm	No. 15	vs. Dayton; Chicago Invitational Challenge	L 75–89	5–1	Sears Centre (4,780); Hoffman Estates, IL
December 2, 2008*; 7:00 pm		Central Michigan	W 81–67	6–1	Bradley Center (13,158); Milwaukee, WI
December 5, 2008*; 8:30 pm		No. 21 Wisconsin	W 61–58	7–1	Bradley Center (18,895); Milwaukee, WI
December 13, 2008*; 7:30 pm	No. 24	IPFW	W 69–50	8–1	Bradley Center (13,470); Milwaukee, WI
December 16, 2008*; 7:30 pm	No. 23	at No. 19 Tennessee	L 68–80	8–2	Sommet Center (9,498); Nashville, TN
December 19, 2008*; 7:00 pm	No. 23	Western Carolina	W 94–77	9–2	Bradley Center (13,653); Milwaukee, WI
December 22, 2008*; 8:00 pm	No. 25	at North Carolina State	W 68–65	10–2	RBC Center (16,819); Raleigh, NC
December 28, 2008*; 6:00 pm	No. 25	Presbyterian	W 84–45	11–2	Bradley Center (13,879); Milwaukee, WI
Conference games
January 1, 2009; 11:00 am	No. 25	No. 13 Villanova	W 79–72	12–2 (1–0)	Bradley Center (16,446); Milwaukee, WI
January 4, 2009; 1:00 pm	No. 25	Cincinnati	W 84–50	13–2 (2–0)	Bradley Center (16,667); Milwaukee, WI
January 7, 2009; 8:00 pm	No. 15	at Rutgers	W 81–76	14–2 (3–0)	Louis Brown Athletic Center (4,112); Piscataway, NJ
January 10, 2009; 1:00 pm	No. 15	No. 22 West Virginia	W 75–53	15–2 (4–0)	Bradley Center (17,085); Milwaukee, WI
January 17, 2009; 8:00 pm	No. 14	at Providence	W 91–82	16–2 (5–0)	Dunkin' Donuts Center (10,221); Providence, RI
January 24, 2009; 1:00 pm	No. 10	DePaul	W 79–70	17–2 (6–0)	Bradley Center (18,949); Milwaukee, WI
January 26, 2009; 8:00 pm	No. 8	at No. 22 Notre Dame	W 71–64	18–2 (7–0)	Edmund P. Joyce Center (11,418); Notre Dame, IN
January 31, 2009; 1:00 pm	No. 8	No. 22 Georgetown	W 94–82	19–2 (8–0)	Bradley Center (19,041); Milwaukee, WI
February 3, 2009; 8:00 pm	No. 8	at DePaul	W 76–61	20–2 (9–0)	Allstate Arena (11,230); Rosemont, IL
February 6, 2009; 6:00 pm	No. 8	at South Florida	L 57–58	20–3 (9–1)	USF Sun Dome (5,316); Tampa, FL
February 10, 2009; 6:30 pm	No. 11	at No. 13 Villanova	L 84–102	20–4 (9–2)	The Pavilion (6,500); Villanova, PA
February 14, 2009; 8:00 pm	No. 11	St. John's	W 73–59	21–4 (10–2)	Bradley Center (18,614); Milwaukee, WI
February 17, 2009; 7:00 pm	No. 10	Seton Hall	W 79–67	22–4 (11–2)	Bradley Center (18,709); Milwaukee, WI
February 21, 2009; 1:00 pm	No. 10	at Georgetown	W 78–72	23–4 (12–2)	Verizon Center (17,686); Washington, D.C.
February 25, 2009; 6:00 pm	No. 8	No. 2 Connecticut	L 82–93	23–5 (12–3)	Bradley Center (19,091); Milwaukee, WI
March 1, 2009; 11:00 am	No. 8	at No. 6 Louisville	L 58–62	23–6 (12–4)	Freedom Hall (20,079); Louisville, Kentucky
March 4, 2009; 6:30 pm	No. 13	at No. 3 Pittsburgh	L 75–90	23–7 (12–5)	Petersen Events Center (12,508); Pittsburgh, PA
March 7, 2009; 1:00 pm, ESPN360	No. 13	No. 25 Syracuse	L 79–86 ^{OT}	23–8 (12–6)	Bradley Center (19,144); Milwaukee, Wisconsin
Big East tournament
March 11, 2009; 2:30 pm, ESPN	No. 21	vs. St. John's; Second Round	W 74–45	24–8	Madison Square Garden (19,375); New York, NY
March 12, 2009; 2:30 pm, ESPN	No. 21	vs. No. 10 Villanova; Quarterfinals	L 75–76	24–9	Madison Square Garden (19,375); New York, NY
NCAA tournament
March 20, 2009; 12:30 pm, CBS	No. 23	vs. Utah State; First Round	W 58–57	25–9	Taco Bell Arena (N/A); Boise, ID
March 22, 2009; 3:50 pm, CBS	No. 23	vs. Missouri; Second Round	L 79–83	25–10	Taco Bell Arena (12,184); Boise, ID
*Non-conference game. ^{#}Rankings from AP Poll. (#) Tournament seedings in parentheses.

== Rankings ==
Ranking movements Legend: ██ Increase in ranking ██ Decrease in ranking — = Not ranked т = Tied with team above or below
	Week																			
Poll	Pre	1	2	3	4	5	6	7	8	9	10	11	12	13	14	15	16	17	18	Final
AP	16	15 т	15	25	24	24	—		18	14	11	8	8	10	10	8	13	21	23	Not released
Coaches	17	17	15	—	24	23	25	25	15	14	10	8	8	12	11 т	10	15	21	24	21
