= 2008–09 Villanova Wildcats men's basketball team =

American college basketball season

2008–09 Villanova Wildcats men's basketball

NCAA tournament, Final Four
- Conference: Big East Conference

Ranking
- Coaches: No. 4
- AP: No. 11
- Record: 30–8 (13–5 Big East)
- Head coach: Jay Wright
- Assistant coaches: Pat Chambers; Doug West; Jason Donnelly
- Home arena: The Pavilion

2008–09 Big East men's basketball standings
	Conf.				Overall
Team	W		L	PCT	W		L	PCT
No. 1 Louisville†	16	–	2	.889	31	–	6	.838
No. 4 Pittsburgh	15	–	3	.833	31	–	5	.861
No. 5 Connecticut	15	–	3	.833	31	–	5	.861
No. 11 Villanova	13	–	5	.722	30	–	8	.789
No. 23 Marquette	12	–	6	.667	25	–	10	.714
No. 13 Syracuse	11	–	7	.611	28	–	10	.737
West Virginia	10	–	8	.556	23	–	12	.657
Providence	10	–	8	.556	19	–	14	.576
Notre Dame	8	–	10	.444	21	–	15	.583
Cincinnati	8	–	10	.444	18	–	14	.563
Seton Hall	7	–	11	.389	17	–	15	.531
Georgetown	7	–	11	.389	16	–	15	.516
St. John's	6	–	12	.333	16	–	18	.471
South Florida	4	–	14	.222	9	–	22	.290
Rutgers	2	–	16	.111	11	–	21	.344
DePaul	0	–	18	.000	9	–	24	.273
† 2009 Big East tournament winner As of April 4, 2009; Rankings from AP Poll

The 2008–09 Villanova Wildcats men's basketball team represented Villanova University in the 2008–09 NCAA Division I men's basketball season. They were led by Jay Wright in his eighth year as head coach of the Wildcats. The Wildcats played their home games at The Pavilion on the school's campus as members of the Big East Conference. They finished the season 30–8, 13–5 in Big East play to finish in fourth place. They lost in the semifinals of the Big East tournament to Louisville. The Wildcats received an at-large bid to the NCAA tournament as the No. 3 seed in the East region. They defeated American, UCLA, Duke, and Pittsburgh to advance to the Final Four. In the Final Four they were defeated by the eventual national champion for the second straight year, North Carolina.

== Previous season ==
The Wildcats finished the 2007–08 season 22–13, 9–9 in Big East play to finish in a tie for eighth place. The Wildcats lost in the quarterfinals of the Big East tournament to Georgetown. They received an at-large bid to the NCAA tournament where they defeated Clemson and Siena to advance to the Sweet Sixteen. There they lost to the eventual national champions, Kansas.

== Offseason ==
=== Recruiting class of 2008 ===
College recruiting
Name	Hometown	School	Height	Weight	Commit date
Maurice Sutton; C	Upper Marlboro, MD	Largo HS	6 ft 10 in (2.08 m)	190 lb (86 kg)	May 21, 2008
Maurice Sutton; C	Recruit ratings: Scout: Rivals: (87)				
Overall Recruiting Rankings: Scout – NR Rivals – NR ESPN – NR

== Roster ==
Villanova Basketball; 2008–09 Roster
G/F	22	Dwayne Anderson	SR	Washington, D.C. (St. Thomas More)
F	20	Shane Clark	SR	Philadelphia, PA (Hargrave Military Academy)
G	4	Jason Colenda	SO	Fairfax, VA (Bishop O'Connell)
F	33	Dante Cunningham	SR	Silver Spring, MD (Potomac)
G	10	Corey Fisher	SO	The Bronx, New York City (St. Patrick's, NJ)
C	3	Maurice Sutton	FR	Upper Marlboro, MD (Largo HS, MD)
F	0	Antonio Pena	SO	Brooklyn, New York City (St. Thomas More)
G	15	Reggie Redding	JR	Philadelphia, PA (St. Joseph's Prep)
G	1	Scottie Reynolds	JR	Herndon, VA (Herndon)
G	24	Corey Stokes	SO	Bayonne, NJ (St. Benedict's)
F	42	Frank Tchuisi	SR	Douala, Cameroon (St. Benedict's)
F	23	Russell Wooten	JR	Chula Vista, CA (St. Augustine)

== Season ==
Before the season began, on October 22, 2008, the Wildcats were selected to finish fifth among the 16 Big East Conference teams in the annual preseason coaches' poll at Madison Square Garden. As part of recent tradition, the 2008 Hoopsmania (an on-campus kickoff of the Villanova Basketball season), included a performance by hip-hop artist T-Pain. Previous artists have included 50 Cent, Tony Yayo and MIMS.

The Villanova-Pitt game on January 28, 2009 was the last game to be held at the Wachovia Spectrum which drew a crowd of 17,449. The Wildcats finished perfect the year at the Pavilion. Villanova's 25 regular-season wins tied a school record. It had been done three times before, but not since 1950–51.

During the 2009 Big East Awards Ceremony, head coach Jay Wright was named the 2009 Big East Coach of the Year. He won the award twice in the previous four years. Villanova senior forward Dante Cunningham was named the Big East's Most Improved Player, and sophomore guard Corey Fisher won the Sixth Man Award. Cunningham, a senior forward, won second-team honors on the all-Big East team, while junior guard Scottie Reynolds took honorable mention.

== Schedule and results ==
Date time, TV	Rank^{#}	Opponent^{#}	Result	Record	Site (attendance) city, state
Exhibition
Nov 6, 2008*	No. 25	Northwood	W 75–37		Wachovia Spectrum; Philadelphia, PA
Non-conference regular season
Nov 14, 2008*	No. 25	Albany	W 78–60	1–0	The Pavilion; Villanova, PA
Nov 17, 2008*	No. 23	Fordham	W 107–68	2–0	The Pavilion; Villanova, PA
Nov 19, 2008*; ESPNU	No. 23	Niagara	W 77–62	3–0	The Pavilion; Villanova, PA
Nov 25, 2008*	No. 22	Monmouth; Philly Hoop Group Classic	W 71–48	4–0	The Pavilion; Villanova, PA
Nov 28, 2008*	No. 22	Towson; Philly Hoop Group Classic	W 64–47	5–0	The Palestra; Philadelphia, PA
Nov 29, 2008*	No. 22	Rhode Island; Philly Hoop Group Classic	W 78–65	6–0	The Palestra; Philadelphia, PA
Dec 2, 2008*	No. 16	at Penn; Big 5	W 69–47	7–0	The Palestra; Philadelphia, PA
Dec 4, 2008*	No. 16	Houston Baptist	W 93–57	8–0	The Pavilion; Villanova, PA
Dec 9, 2008*; ESPN	No. 12	vs. No. 6 Texas; Jimmy V Classic	L 58–67	8–1	Madison Square Garden; New York, NY
Dec 11, 2008*	No. 12	Saint Joseph's; Big 5	W 59–56	9–1	The Pavilion; Vilanova, PA
Dec 11, 2008*	No. 12	at La Salle; Big 5	W 70–59	10–1	Tom Gola Arena; Philadelphia, PA
Dec 22, 2008*	No. 16	Navy	W 78–68	11–1	The Pavilion; Vilanova, PA
Dec 29, 2008*; ESPNU	No. 13	Temple; Big 5	W 62–45	12–1	The Pavilion; Vilanova, PA
Big East regular season
Jan 1, 2009; ESPN	No. 13	at No. 13 Marquette	L 72–79	12–2 (0–1)	Bradley Center; Milwaukee, WI
Jan 6, 2009; WPHL	No. 17	at Seton Hall	W 89–85 ^{OT}	13–2 (1–1)	Prudential Center; Newark, NJ
Jan 10, 2009; ESPN	No. 17	No. 21 Louisville	L 60–61	13–3 (1–2)	Wachovia Center; Philadelphia, PA
Jan 18; WPHL	No. 22	St. John's	W 76–57	14–3 (2–2)	The Pavilion; Villanova, PA
Jan 21, 2009; ESPN	No. 21	at No. 3 Connecticut	L 83–89	14–4 (2–3)	Harry A. Gampel Pavilion; Hartford, CT
Jan 24; WPHL	No. 21	at South Florida	W 70–61	15–4 (3–3)	USF Sun Dome; Tampa, FL
Jan 28, 2009; ESPNU	No. 21	at No. 3 Pittsburgh	W 67–57	16–4 (4–3)	Wachovia Spectrum; Philadelphia, PA
Feb 1, 2009; WPHL	No. 21	Cincinnati	W 71–50	17–4 (5–3)	The Pavilion; Vilanova, PA
Feb 4, 2009; WPHL	No. 16	at Providence	W 94–91	18–4 (6–3)	Dunkin' Donuts Center; Providence, RI
Feb 7, 2009; ESPN	No. 16	No. 20 Syracuse	W 102–85	19–4 (7–3)	The Pavilion; Vilanova, PA
Feb 10, 2009; ESPN2	No. 13	No. 12 Marquette	W 102–84	20–4 (8–3)	The Pavilion; Vilanova, PA
Feb 13, 2009; ESPN	No. 13	at West Virginia	L 72–93	20–5 (8–4)	WVU Coliseum; Morgantown, WV
Feb 19; ESPN2	No. 14	Rutgers	W 82–72	21–5 (9–4)	The Pavilion; Vilanova, PA
Feb 22; CBS	No. 14	at No. 25 Syracuse	W 89–86	22–5 (10–4)	Carrier Dome; Syracuse, NY
Feb 25, 2009; WPHL	No. 12	at DePaul	W 74–72	23–5 (11–4)	Allstate Arena; Rosemont, IL
Feb 28, 2009; ESPN	No. 12	Georgetown	L 54–56	23–6 (11–5)	Wachovia Center; Philadelphia, PA
Mar 2, 2009; ESPN	No. 16	at Notre Dame	W 77–60	24–6 (12–5)	Joyce Center; South Bend, IN
Mar 5, 2009; ESPN2	No. 16	Providence	W 97–80	25–6 (13–5)	The Pavilion; Vilanova, PA
Big East tournament
Mar 12, 2009	(4) No. 13	vs. (5) No. 21 Marquette; Quarterfinals	W 76–75	26–6	Madison Square Garden; New York, NY
Mar 13, 2009	(4) No. 13	vs. (1) No. 5 Louisville; Semifinals	L 63–82	26–7	Madison Square Garden; New York, NY
NCAA tournament
Mar 19, 2008*	(3E) No. 12	vs. (14E) American; First Round	W 80–67	27–7	Wachovia Center; Philadelphia, PA
Mar 21, 2009*	(3E) No. 12	vs. (6E) No. 17 UCLA; Second Round	W 89–69	28–7	Wachovia Center; Philadelphia, PA
Mar 26, 2009*	(3E) No. 12	vs. (2E) No. 5 Duke; Sweet Sixteen	W 77–54	29–7	TD Banknorth Garden; Boston, MA
Mar 28, 2009*	(3E) No. 12	vs. (1E) No. 4 Pittsburgh; Elite Eight	W 78–76	30–7	TD Banknorth Garden; Boston, MA
Apr 4, 2009*	(3E) No. 12	vs. (1W) No. 2 North Carolina; Final Four	L 69–83	30–8	Ford Field; Detroit, MI
*Non-conference game. ^{#}Rankings from AP Poll. (#) Tournament seedings in parentheses. All times are in Eastern Time.

== Rankings ==
Ranking movements Legend: ██ Increase in ranking ██ Decrease in ranking
	Week																		
Poll	Pre	1	2	3	4	5	6	7	8	9	10	11	12	13	14	15	16	17	Final
AP	23	23	20	17	15	18	18	15	18	23	20	21	17	13	12	10	11	10	Not released
Coaches	25	23	22	16	12	15	16	13	17	22	21	21	16	13	14	12	16	13	4

*AP does not release post-NCAA tournament rankings.
