= 2008–09 West Virginia Mountaineers men's basketball team =

American college basketball season

2008–09 West Virginia Mountaineers men's basketball

NCAA tournament, Round of 64
- Conference: Big East Conference|Big East
- Record: 23–12 (10–8 Big East)
- Head coach: Bob Huggins (2nd season)
- Assistant coaches: Billy Hahn; Larry Harrison; Erik Martin
- Home arena: WVU Coliseum

2008–09 Big East men's basketball standings
	Conf.				Overall
Team	W		L	PCT	W		L	PCT
No. 1 Louisville†	16	–	2	.889	31	–	6	.838
No. 4 Pittsburgh	15	–	3	.833	31	–	5	.861
No. 5 Connecticut	15	–	3	.833	31	–	5	.861
No. 11 Villanova	13	–	5	.722	30	–	8	.789
No. 23 Marquette	12	–	6	.667	25	–	10	.714
No. 13 Syracuse	11	–	7	.611	28	–	10	.737
West Virginia	10	–	8	.556	23	–	12	.657
Providence	10	–	8	.556	19	–	14	.576
Notre Dame	8	–	10	.444	21	–	15	.583
Cincinnati	8	–	10	.444	18	–	14	.563
Seton Hall	7	–	11	.389	17	–	15	.531
Georgetown	7	–	11	.389	16	–	15	.516
St. John's	6	–	12	.333	16	–	18	.471
South Florida	4	–	14	.222	9	–	22	.290
Rutgers	2	–	16	.111	11	–	21	.344
DePaul	0	–	18	.000	9	–	24	.273
† 2009 Big East tournament winner As of April 4, 2009; Rankings from AP Poll

The 2008–09 West Virginia Mountaineers men's basketball team represented West Virginia University in the 2008-09 NCAA Division I men's basketball season. The team was coached by Bob Huggins and played their home games in the WVU Coliseum in Morgantown, West Virginia.

== Pre-season ==
During the offseason, the Mountaineers picked up four recruits who look to make an immediate impact in Morgantown. Devin Ebanks a 6–9, 205 pound forward from Oakdale, CT seems to be the Mountaineers #1 recruit, being ranked #11 on the Rivals.com Top 150 recruits. The Mountaineers also added Darryl "Truck" Bryant, a 6-2 190 pound guard from Brooklyn, NY, Kevin Jones, a 6-7 210 pound forward from Mount Vernon, NY, and Dee Proby a 6-9 250 pound forward from Angelina College in Lufkin, TX. West Virginia was picked to finish 9th in the Big East Pre-Season Coaches Poll.

== Roster ==
Name	Number	Position	Height	Weight	Year	Hometown
Darryl Bryant	25	G	6-2	200	Freshman	Brooklyn, New York
Da'Sean Butler	1	F	6-7	225	Junior	Newark, New Jersey
Devin Ebanks	3	F	6-9	205	Freshman	Long Island City, New York
John Flowers	41	F	6-7	203	Sophomore	Waldorf, Maryland
Kevin Jones	5	F	6-8	230	Freshman	Mount Vernon, New York
Joe Mazzulla	21	G	6-2	205	Junior	Johnston, Rhode Island
Cameron Payne	33	G	6-4	215	Redshirt-Freshman	Charleston, West Virginia
Dee Proby	45	F	6-10	240	Junior	Round Rock, Texas
Alex Ruoff	22	G	6-6	220	Senior	Spring Hill, Florida
Wellington Smith	35	F	6-7	230	Junior	Summit, New Jersey
Josh Sowards	20	F	6-7	215	Redshirt-Junior	Scott Depot, West Virginia
Will Thomas	24	G	6-5	215	Sophomore	East Cleveland, Ohio
Cam Thoroughman	2	F	6-7	225	Redshirt-Sophomore	Portsmouth, Ohio
Jonnie West	4	G	6-3	187	Redshirt-Sophomore	Memphis, Tennessee

== Schedule and results ==
Date time, TV	Rank^{#}	Opponent^{#}	Result	Record	Site (attendance) city, state
Regular Season
November 15, 2008*; 7:00 pm		Elon	W 92–47	1–0	WVU Coliseum (10,250); Morgantown, WV
November 20, 2008*; 7:00 pm		Longwood	W 86–54	2–0	WVU Coliseum (6,917); Morgantown, WV
November 25, 2008*; 7:00 pm		vs. Delaware State; Las Vegas Invitational	W 76–42	3–0	Charleston Civic Center (10,434); Charleston, WV
November 28, 2008*; 9:00 pm, ESPN360		vs. Iowa; Las Vegas Invitational	W 87–68	4–0	Orleans Arena (5,000); Las Vegas, NV
November 29, 2008*; 10:30 pm, ESPN2		vs. Kentucky; Las Vegas Invitational Championship Game	L 43–54	4–1	Orleans Arena (5,500); Las Vegas, NV
December 3, 2008*; 9:00 pm, ESPN360		at Mississippi	W 80–78	5–1	Tad Smith Coliseum (6,787); Oxford, MS
December 6, 2008*; 1:00 pm		Cleveland State	W 53–43	6–1	WVU Coliseum (8,765); Morgantown, WV
December 9, 2008*; 7:00 pm, ESPN		vs. No. 23 Davidson; Jimmy V Classic	L 65–68	6–2	Madison Square Garden (14,675); New York, NY
December 13, 2008*; 7:00 pm		Duquesne	W 68–63	7–2	A.J. Palumbo Center (3,487); Pittsburgh, PA
December 20, 2008*; 12:00 pm, ESPNU		Miami (OH)	W 82–46	8–2	WVU Coliseum (8,980); Morgantown, WV
December 23, 2008*; 7:00 pm		Radford	W 89–54	9–2	WVU Coliseum (7,064); Morgantown, WV
December 27, 2008*; 4:00 pm, CBS		at No. 15 Ohio State	W 76–48	10–2	Value City Arena (19,049); Columbus, OH
January 3, 2009; 4:00 pm, ESPN360		at Seton Hall	W 92–66	11–2 (1–0)	Prudential Center (8,127); Newark, NJ
January 6, 2009; 7:00 pm, ESPNU	No. 25	No. 5 Connecticut	L 55–61	11–3 (1–1)	WVU Coliseum (13,920); Morgantown, WV
January 10, 2009; 12:00 pm, ESPN360	No. 25	at No. 18 Marquette	L 53–75	11–4 (1–2)	Bradley Center (17,085); Milwaukee, WI
January 14, 2009*; 1:00 pm		vs. Marshall; Chesapeake Energy Capital Classic	W 87–76	12–4	Charleston Civic Center (12,580); Charleston, WV
January 17, 2009; 12:00 pm, ESPN360		South Florida	W 62–59	13–4 (2–2)	WVU Coliseum (11,037); Morgantown, WV
January 22, 2009; 7:00 pm, ESPN		at No. 12 Georgetown	W 75–58	14–4 (3–2)	Verizon Center (12,875); Washington, D.C.
January 25, 2009; 4:00 pm, ESPN360		No. 4 Pittsburgh; Backyard Brawl	L 67–79	14–5 (3–3)	WVU Coliseum (14,329); Morgantown, WV
January 28, 2009; 7:00 pm, ESPN360		St. John's	W 75–52	15–5 (4–3)	WVU Coliseum (6,583); Morgantown, WV
January 31, 2009; 12:00 pm, ESPN360		at No. 7 Louisville	L 63–69	15–6 (4–4)	Freedom Hall (19,416); Louisville, KY
February 4, 2009; 7:00 pm, ESPN		at No. 20 Syracuse	L 61–74	15–7 (4–5)	Carrier Dome (21,069); Syracuse, NY
February 7, 2009; 4:00 pm, ESPN360		Providence	W 86–59	16–7 (5–5)	WVU Coliseum (11,091); Morgantown, WV
February 9, 2009; 7:00 pm, ESPN		at No. 4 Pittsburgh; Backyard Brawl	L 59–70	16–8 (5–6)	Petersen Events Center (12,508); Pittsburgh, PA
February 13, 2009; 9:00 pm, ESPN		No. 13 Villanova	W 93–72	17–8 (6–6)	WVU Coliseum (12,513); Morgantown, WV
February 18, 2009; 7:00 pm, ESPN360		Notre Dame	W 79–68	18–8 (7–6)	WVU Coliseum (13,126); Morgantown, WV
February 22, 2009; 3:00 pm, ESPN360		at Rutgers	W 74–56	19–8 (8–6)	Louis Brown Athletic Center (5,281); Piscataway, NJ
February 26, 2009; 7:00 pm, ESPN		at Cincinnati	L 61–65	19–9 (8–7)	Fifth Third Arena (11,332); Cincinnati, OH
March 1, 2008; 4:00 pm, ESPN360		at South Florida	W 64–50	20–9 (9–7)	USF Sun Dome (5,082); Tampa, FL
March 4, 2009; 7:00 pm, ESPN360		DePaul	W 82–63	21–9 (10–7)	WVU Coliseum (10,070); Morgantown, WV
March 7, 2009; 9:00 pm, ESPN		No. 6 Louisville; ESPN College GameDay	L 59–62	21–10 (10–8)	WVU Coliseum (13,089); Morgantown, WV
Big East tournament
March 11, 2009; 7:00 pm, ESPN		vs. Notre Dame; Second Round	W 74–62	22–10	Madison Square Garden (19,375); New York, NY
March 12, 2009; 7:00 pm, ESPN		vs. No. 2 Pittsburgh; Quarterfinals (Backyard Brawl)	W 74–60	23–10	Madison Square Garden (19,375); New York, NY
March 13, 2009; 9:30 pm, ESPN		vs. No. 18 Syracuse; Semifinals	L 69–74 ^{OT}	23–11	Madison Square Garden (19,375); New York, NY
NCAA Tournament
March 20, 2009*; 3:00 pm, CBS		vs. Dayton; 1st Round	L 60–68	23–12	Hubert H. Humphrey Metrodome (15,794); Minneapolis, MN
*Non-conference game. ^{#}Rankings from AP poll. (#) Tournament seedings in parentheses.

== Rankings ==
Ranking movements Legend: ██ Increase in ranking ██ Decrease in ranking — = Not ranked
	Week																			
Poll	Pre	1	2	3	4	5	6	7	8	9	10	11	12	13	14	15	16	17	18	Final
AP									25	—										Not released
Coaches									22	—										
