= 2008–09 Connecticut Huskies men's basketball team =

American college basketball season

2008–09 Connecticut Huskies men's basketball

Paradise Jam tournament champions

NCAA tournament, Final Four
- Conference: Big East Conference

Ranking
- Coaches: No. 3
- AP: No. 5
- Record: 31–5 (15–3 Big East)
- Head coach: Jim Calhoun (23rd season)
- Assistant coaches: George Blaney; Andre LaFleur; Patrick Sellers
- Home arena: Harry A. Gampel Pavilion

2008–09 Big East men's basketball standings
	Conf.				Overall
Team	W		L	PCT	W		L	PCT
No. 1 Louisville†	16	–	2	.889	31	–	6	.838
No. 4 Pittsburgh	15	–	3	.833	31	–	5	.861
No. 5 Connecticut	15	–	3	.833	31	–	5	.861
No. 11 Villanova	13	–	5	.722	30	–	8	.789
No. 23 Marquette	12	–	6	.667	25	–	10	.714
No. 13 Syracuse	11	–	7	.611	28	–	10	.737
West Virginia	10	–	8	.556	23	–	12	.657
Providence	10	–	8	.556	19	–	14	.576
Notre Dame	8	–	10	.444	21	–	15	.583
Cincinnati	8	–	10	.444	18	–	14	.563
Seton Hall	7	–	11	.389	17	–	15	.531
Georgetown	7	–	11	.389	16	–	15	.516
St. John's	6	–	12	.333	16	–	18	.471
South Florida	4	–	14	.222	9	–	22	.290
Rutgers	2	–	16	.111	11	–	21	.344
DePaul	0	–	18	.000	9	–	24	.273
† 2009 Big East tournament winner As of April 4, 2009; Rankings from AP Poll

The 2008–2009 Connecticut Huskies men's basketball team represented the University of Connecticut in the 2008–2009 NCAA Division I basketball season. Coached by Jim Calhoun, the Huskies played their home games at the XL Center in Hartford, Connecticut, and on campus at the Harry A. Gampel Pavilion in Storrs, Connecticut. The Huskies were members of the Big East Conference.

The Huskies finished the season 31–5, 15–3 in Big East play to finish in a tie for second place. UConn lost to Syracuse in the quarterfinals of the Big East tournament 127–117 in six overtimes. In the NCAA tournament, the Huskies received a No. 1 seed in the West Region and advanced to their third Final Four with wins over Chattanooga, Texas A&M, No. 17 Purdue, and No. 9 Missouri. In the Final Four at Ford Field, UConn lost to No. 8 Michigan State 82–73

== Roster ==
Listed are the student athletes who are members of the 2008–2009 team.

#	Name	Position	Year
4	Jeff Adrien	Forward	Sr
24	Craig Austrie	Guard	Sr
55	Kyle Bailey	Guard	So
2	Donnell Beverly	Guard	So
10	Johnnie Bird	Guard	Sr
11	Jerome Dyson	Guard	Jr
33	Gavin Edwards	Forward/Center	Jr
30	Scottie Haralson	Guard	Fr
13	Alex Hornat	Forward	Jr
45	John Linder	Forward	Sr
32	Jonathan Mandeldove	Center	Jr
35	Charles Okwandu	Center	So
12	A. J. Price	Guard	Sr
21	Stanley Robinson	Forward	So
34	Hasheem Thabeet	Center	Jr
40	Jim Veronick	Forward	Sr
15	Kemba Walker	Guard	Fr

== 2008 recruiting class ==
College recruiting information
Name	Hometown	School	Height	Weight	Commit date
Scottie Haralson; SG	Jackson, MS	Provine HS	6 ft 4 in (1.93 m)	190 lb (86 kg)	Jan 25, 2008
Scottie Haralson; SG	Recruit ratings: Scout: Rivals: (40)				
Nate Miles; SG	Patterson, NC	The Patterson School	6 ft 6 in (1.98 m)	170 lb (77 kg)	Nov 20, 2006
Nate Miles; SG	Recruit ratings: Scout: Rivals: (88)				
Kemba Walker; PG	New York, NY	Rice HS	6 ft 1 in (1.85 m)	172 lb (78 kg)	Jun 9, 2007
Kemba Walker; PG	Recruit ratings: Scout: Rivals: (96)				
Overall recruit ranking: Scout: 7 Rivals: 8
Note: In many cases, Scout, Rivals, 247Sports, On3, and ESPN may conflict in their listings of height and weight.; In these cases, the average was taken. ESPN grades are on a 100-point scale.; Sources: "Connecticut Basketball Commitments". Rivals.; "2008 Connecticut Basketball Commits". Scout.; "ESPN". ESPN.; "Scout.com Team Recruiting Rankings". Scout.; "2008 Team Ranking". Rivals.

== Regular season ==
The Huskies' season began with the team ranked No. 2 in the AP Poll. behind the University of North Carolina. Off to a quick start, UConn opened with a string of eleven straight victories over non-conference opponents, including a sweep of the Paradise Jam tournament in the U.S. Virgin Islands. During this stretch, the Huskies faced three teams that were ranked in the Top 25, including No. 8 Gonzaga in an overtime thriller in Seattle.

The first Big East Conference game of the season came at home against Georgetown, which the Huskies lost 74–63. This was the start of a 19-game stretch where 18 of the games were against conference opponents, and where their opponents were ranked in nine of the games. After this first loss, the Huskies went on to win 13 straight, staying comfortably atop the Big East Conference standings. Among these was a 68–51 victory at No. 7 Louisville— the eventual outright Big East Champions.

The Huskies reached No. 1 in the rankings on February 2, 2009, and held it for three weeks. During this span junior guard Jerome Dyson, one of the team's biggest scoring threats and its best guard defender, injured his knee. He would not be able to play for the rest of the season. The team spent the final few weeks of the regular season adjusting to their smaller rotation. A 76–68 loss at home to No. 4 Pittsburgh knocked them from the top spot. They would win their next three games, including at No. 8 Marquette, which was Coach Jim Calhoun's 800th career victory in Division I basketball. After one week at No. 2, UConn was again No. 1 in the polls, until a loss at No. 3 Pittsburgh to finish the regular season once again bumped the Huskies from the top.

The Huskies finished the regular season with 27 wins and 3 losses, with a conference record of 15–3. The team was not ranked out of the top 5 in the AP Poll at any point in the season.

== Post-season ==
In the quarterfinals of the Big East tournament, UConn took on Syracuse. The game would prove to be a historic event, as it took a Big East record six overtimes before Syracuse ultimately triumphed, 127–117. The contest is tied as the second longest in NCAA Division I history.

The Huskies earned the No. 1 seed in the West Regional of the NCAA tournament. They began play in Philadelphia, Pennsylvania, where they had two blowout victories against Chattanooga and Texas A&M. They moved on to Glendale, AZ for the West regionals, first defeating Purdue 72–60, then outlasting a pressing Missouri squad in the Elite Eight, 82–75.

The following weekend the Huskies were in Detroit, MI for a Final Four matchup against the Midwest's No. 2 seed, Michigan State. The game was close throughout, until the Spartans began to take control near the ten-minute mark of the second half. UConn would make one last run and cut the deficit to three late in the game, but Michigan State made key free throws and held on to win, 82–73. UConn's final record was 31 wins and 5 losses.

== Schedule and results ==
Date time, TV	Rank^{#}	Opponent^{#}	Result	Record	Site (attendance) city, state
Exhibition
November 5, 2008*	No. 2	American International	W 83–58		Harry A. Gampel Pavilion; Storrs, CT
November 9, 2008*	No. 2	UMass Lowell	W 82–63		XL Center; Hartford, CT
Regular season
November 14, 2008*	No. 2	Western Carolina	W 81–55	1–0	Harry A. Gampel Pavilion (9,820); Storrs, CT
November 17, 2008*; WCTX	No. 2	Hartford	W 99–56	2–0	XL Center (11,849); Hartford, CT
November 21, 2008*; WCTX	No. 2	vs. La Salle; US Virgin Islands Paradise Jam	W 89–81	3–0	University of the Virgin Islands (3,095); US Virgin Islands
November 23, 2008*; FCS	No. 2	vs. No. 17 Miami; US Virgin Islands Paradise Jam	W 76–63	4–0	University of the Virgin Islands (3,271); US Virgin Islands
November 24, 2008*; FSN	No. 2	vs. No. 25 Wisconsin; US Virgin Islands Paradise Jam	W 76–57	5–0	University of the Virgin Islands (3,691); US Virgin Islands
November 29, 2008*; WCTX	No. 2	Bryant	W 88–58	6–0	XL Center (12,558); Hartford, CT
December 1, 2008*; WCTX	No. 2	Delaware State	W 79–49	7–0	Harry A. Gampel Pavilion (9,734); Storrs, CT
December 4, 2008*; WCTX	No. 2	at Buffalo	W 68–64	8–0	Alumni Arena (4,899); Buffalo, NY
December 15, 2008*; WCTX	No. 2	Stony Brook	W 91–57	9–0	XL Center (12,721); Hartford, CT
December 20, 2008*; CBS	No. 2	at No. 8 Gonzaga; Battle in Seattle	W 88–83	10–0	KeyArena (16,763); Seattle, WA
December 26, 2008*; ESPNU	No. 2	Fairfield	W 75–55	11–0	XL Center (13,771); Hartford, CT
December 29, 2008; ESPN	No. 2	No. 11 Georgetown; Rivalry	L 63–74	11–1 (0–1)	XL Center (16,294); Hartford, CT
January 3, 2009; WCTX	No. 2	Rutgers	W 80–49	12–1 (1–1)	Harry A. Gampel Pavilion (10,167); Storrs, CT
January 6, 2009; ESPNU	No. 5	at No. 25 West Virginia	W 61–55	13–1 (2–1)	WVU Coliseum (13,920); Morgantown, WV
January 10, 2009; WCTX	No. 5	at Cincinnati	W 81–72	14–1 (3–1)	Fifth Third Arena (9,029); Cincinnati, OH
January 15, 2009; ESPN	No. 4	at St. John's	W 67–55	15–1 (4–1)	Madison Square Garden (7,545); New York, NY
January 18, 2009; WCTX	No. 4	Seton Hall	W 76–61	16–1 (5–1)	XL Center (15,572); Hartford, CT
January 21, 2009; ESPN	No. 3	No. 20 Villanova	W 89–83	17–1 (6–1)	XL Center (15,385); Hartford, CT
January 24, 2009; ESPN	No. 3	at No. 19 Notre Dame; ESPN College GameDay	W 69–61	18–1 (7–1)	Edmund P. Joyce Center (11,418); South Bend, IN
January 28, 2009; WCTX	No. 2	at DePaul	W 71–49	19–1 (8–1)	Allstate Arena (9,502); Chicago, IL
January 31, 2009; WCTX	No. 2	Providence	W 94–61	20–1 (9–1)	Harry A. Gampel Pavilion (10,167); Storrs, CT
February 2, 2009; ESPN	No. 1	at No. 5 Louisville	W 68–51	21–1 (10–1)	Freedom Hall (20,069); Louisville, KY
February 7, 2009*; ESPN	No. 1	Michigan	W 69–61	22–1	Harry A. Gampel Pavilion (10,167); Storrs, CT
February 11, 2009; ESPN	No. 1	No. 23 Syracuse; Rivalry	W 63–49	23–1 (11–1)	Harry A. Gampel Pavilion (10,167); Storrs, CT
February 14, 2009; WCTX	No. 1	at Seton Hall	W 62–54	24–1 (12–1)	Prudential Center (9,800); Newark, NJ
February 16, 2009; ESPN	No. 1	No. 4 Pittsburgh	L 68–76	24–2 (12–2)	XL Center (16,294); Hartford, CT
February 21, 2009; WCTX	No. 1	South Florida	W 64–50	25–2 (13–2)	XL Center (15,451); Hartford, CT
February 25, 2009; ESPN	No. 2	at No. 8 Marquette	W 93–82	26–2 (14–2)	Bradley Center (19,091); Milwaukee, WI
February 28, 2009; CBS	No. 2	Notre Dame	W 72–65	27–2 (15–2)	Harry A. Gampel Pavilion (10,167); Storrs, CT
March 7, 2009; CBS	No. 1	at No. 3 Pittsburgh	L 60–70	27–3 (15–3)	Petersen Events Center (12,908); Pittsburgh, PA
Big East tournament
March 12, 2009; ESPN	(3) No. 3	(6) No. 18 Syracuse; Quarterfinal/Rivalry	L 117–127 ^{6OT}	27–4	Madison Square Garden (19,375); New York, NY
NCAA tournament
March 19, 2009; CBS	(1 W) No. 5	vs. (16 W) Chattanooga; First Round	W 103–47	28–4	Wachovia Center (18,322); Philadelphia, PA
March 21, 2009; CBS	(1 W) No. 5	vs. (9 W) Texas A&M; Second Round	W 92–66	29–4	Wachovia Center (19,894); Philadelphia, PA
March 26, 2009; CBS	(1 W) No. 5	vs. (5 W) No. 17 Purdue; Sweet Sixteen	W 72–60	30–4	University of Phoenix Stadium (20,101); Glendale, AZ
March 28, 2009; CBS	(1 W) No. 5	vs. (3 W) No. 9 Missouri; Elite Eight	W 82–75	31–4	University of Phoenix Stadium (18,886); Glendale, AZ
April 4, 2009; CBS	(1 W) No. 5	vs. (2 MW) No. 8 Michigan State; Final Four	L 73–82	31–5	Ford Field (72,456); Detroit, MI
*Non-conference game. ^{#}Rankings from AP Poll. (#) Tournament seedings in parentheses.

== Rankings ==
Ranking movements Legend: ██ Increase in ranking ██ Decrease in ranking ( ) = First-place votes
	Week																			
Poll	Pre	1	2	3	4	5	6	7	8	9	10	11	12	13	14	15	16	17	18	Final
AP	2	2	2	2	2	2	2	2	5	4	3	2 (6)	1 (64)	1 (67)	1 (66)	2 (1)	1 (67)	3	5 (1)	Not released
Coaches	2	2 (1)	2	2	2	2	2	2	5	4	3	2 (1)	1 (28)	1 (30)	1 (30)	2 (1)	1 (27)	4	6	3

== Postseason awards ==
Second Team All-America:
Hasheem Thabeet, Center, Jr.

National Defensive Player of the Year
Hasheem Thabeet

Big East Co-Players of the Year:
Hasheem Thabeet with DeJuan Blair, Pittsburgh, Center, So.

Big East Defensive Player of the Year:
Hasheem Thabeet

All-Big East First Team:
Hasheem Thabeet

All-Big East Second Team:
A.J. Price, Guard, Sr.

All-Big East Third Team:
Jeff Adrien, Forward, Sr.

Big East All-Rookie Team:
Kemba Walker, Guard, Fr.

== Team players drafted into the NBA ==
Round	Pick	Player	NBA Club
1	2	Hasheem Thabeet	Memphis Grizzlies
2	52	A.J. Price	Indiana Pacers
