= 2008–09 Louisville Cardinals men's basketball team =

American college basketball season

2008–09 Louisville Cardinals men's basketball

Big East Regular Season Champions Big East tournament champions

NCAA tournament, Elite Eight
- Conference: Big East

Ranking
- Coaches: No. 5
- AP: No. 1
- Record: 31–6 (16–2 Big East)
- Head coach: Rick Pitino (8th season)
- Assistant coaches: Steve Masiello; Walter McCarty; Richard Pitino
- Home arena: Freedom Hall

2008–09 Big East men's basketball standings
	Conf.				Overall
Team	W		L	PCT	W		L	PCT
No. 1 Louisville†	16	–	2	.889	31	–	6	.838
No. 4 Pittsburgh	15	–	3	.833	31	–	5	.861
No. 5 Connecticut	15	–	3	.833	31	–	5	.861
No. 11 Villanova	13	–	5	.722	30	–	8	.789
No. 23 Marquette	12	–	6	.667	25	–	10	.714
No. 13 Syracuse	11	–	7	.611	28	–	10	.737
West Virginia	10	–	8	.556	23	–	12	.657
Providence	10	–	8	.556	19	–	14	.576
Notre Dame	8	–	10	.444	21	–	15	.583
Cincinnati	8	–	10	.444	18	–	14	.563
Seton Hall	7	–	11	.389	17	–	15	.531
Georgetown	7	–	11	.389	16	–	15	.516
St. John's	6	–	12	.333	16	–	18	.471
South Florida	4	–	14	.222	9	–	22	.290
Rutgers	2	–	16	.111	11	–	21	.344
DePaul	0	–	18	.000	9	–	24	.273
† 2009 Big East tournament winner As of April 4, 2009; Rankings from AP Poll

The 2008–09 Louisville Cardinals men's basketball team represented the University of Louisville during the 2008–09 NCAA Division I men's basketball season, Louisville's 95th season of intercollegiate competition. The Cardinals competed in the Big East Conference and were coached by Rick Pitino, who was in his eighth season. The team played its home games at Freedom Hall.

The Cardinals finished the season 31–6, 16–2 and were regular season Big East Champions (their 1st). They defeated Syracuse 76–66 to win the 2009 Big East men's basketball tournament (their 1st). They received an automatic bid to the 2009 NCAA Division I men's basketball tournament, earning the overall #1 seed and were placed in the Midwest Region. They were upset by #2 seed Michigan State in the Midwest Regional final, 64–52.

== Preseason ==
After an elite eight appearance in the 2008 tournament, Louisville entered the 2008–09 season ranked third in both the AP and Coaches polls in part due to a strong recruiting class. The incoming freshman class is ranked fifth overall by Scouts.com, led by number one ranked center Samardo Samuels. Louisville has been picked by many analysts to be a potential Final Four contender, including Sports Illustrated and Dick Vitale.

== Regular season ==
Despite the #3 preseason ranking, Louisville struggled in the non-conference losing to three unranked opponents. After beating Kentucky on an Edgar Sosa buzzer-beating three pointer, Louisville entered Big East play ranked #21. After beating South Florida easily, Louisville beat three straight ranked teams in close games: #17 Villanova, #12 Notre Dame in overtime, and previously unbeaten #1 Pittsburgh. Louisville would continue strong play, going undefeated in January and winning its first eight conference games before losing to #1 Connecticut on February 2. After beating St. John's, Louisville lost by their most lopsided margin since joining the Big East, a 33-point drubbing by Notre Dame. After that game, Louisville won its final seven regular season games to win the school's first ever regular season Big East championship.

== Big East tournament ==
By virtue of their outright regular-season title, Louisville received a double-bye in the Big East tournament and played their first game in the tournament quarterfinals. In the tournament, Louisville beat Providence 73–55 in the quarterfinals and #10 Villanova 69–55 in the semifinals to advance to the school's first ever Big East tournament championship game in four seasons in the conference. In the finals, Louisville won its first Big East tournament Championship, defeating #18 Syracuse 76–66. Due to losses in the early conference tournament rounds by several teams above them, the Cardinals finished #1 in the final regular season AP and coaches' polls—the first time in school history they have been ranked #1 in either poll.

== NCAA tournament ==
Louisville was awarded the top seed in the NCAA tournament Midwest Region, as well as the overall #1 seed in the tournament. This is Louisville's second ever 1-seed. The Cardinals beat Morehead St. and Siena in the first two tournament rounds, advancing to face Arizona in the Sweet 16 on March 27. After beating Arizona by 39 points, Louisville faced Michigan St. in the Elite Eight and lost 64–52.

== Roster ==
Name	#	Position	Height	Weight	Year	Home Town
Chris Brickley	11	Guard	6–4	175	Junior	Manchester, NH
Earl Clark	5	Forward	6–9	220	Junior	Plainfield, NJ
Reginald Delk	12	Guard	6–4	175	Junior	Jackson, TN
George Goode	22	Guard	6–8	205	Freshman	Raytown, MO
Terrence Jennings	23	Forward	6–10	225	Freshman	Sacramento, CA
Preston Knowles	2	Guard	6–1	170	Sophomore	Winchester, KY
Kyle Kuric	14	Guard	6–4	175	Freshman	Evansville, IN
Andre McGee	33	Guard	5–10	180	Senior	Moreno Valley, CA
Samardo Samuels	24	Forward	6–9	240	Freshman	Trelawny, Jamaica
Will Scott	20	Guard	6–3	185	Senior	New York, NY
Jerry Smith	34	Guard	6–1	200	Junior	Wauwatosa, WI
Edgar Sosa	10	Guard	6–1	200	Junior	New York, NY
Lee Steiden	25	Forward	6–4	185	Sophomore	Louisville, KY
Jared Swopshire	21	Forward	6–7	215	Freshman	St. Louis, MO
Terrence Williams	1	Forward	6–6	215	Senior	Seattle, WA

== Schedule ==
Date time, TV	Rank^{#}	Opponent^{#}	Result	Record	Site (attendance) city, state
Exhibition games
November 1*; 5:30 pm, WHAS	No. 3	Georgetown (KY) exhibition	W 74–67	0–0	Freedom Hall (17,521); Louisville, KY
November 8*; 8:00 pm, WHAS	No. 3	at Northern Kentucky exhibition	W 84–69	0–0	The Bank of Kentucky Center (8,408); Highland Heights, KY
Non-conference games
November 22*; 5:30 pm, ESPN360/WHAS	No. 3	Morehead State; Billy Minardi Classic	W 102–32	1–0	Freedom Hall (19,493); Louisville, KY
November 23*; 4:00 pm, ESPN360	No. 3	South Alabama; Billy Minardi Classic	W 81–54	2–0	Freedom Hall (19,241); Louisville, KY
November 30*; 3:00 pm, FCS/WHAS	No. 3	vs. Western Kentucky	L 54–68	2–1	Sommet Center (8,193); Nashville, TN
December 6*; 2:00 pm, WHAS	No. 11	Indiana State; Marques Maybin Classic	W 83–43	3–1	Freedom Hall (18,924); Louisville, KY
December 7*; 4:00 pm, ESPN Full Court/WHAS	No. 11	Ohio; Marques Maybin Classic	W 91–56	4–1	Freedom Hall (19,083); Louisville, KY
December 8*; 7:00 pm, ESPN Full Court/WHAS	No. 9	Lamar; Marques Maybin Classic	W 78–56	5–1	Freedom Hall (19,058); Louisville, KY
December 13*; 1:00 pm, ESPN Full Court/WHAS	No. 9	Austin Peay	W 94–75	6–1	Freedom Hall (19,288); Louisville, KY
December 18*; 9:00 pm, ESPN	No. 9	vs. Mississippi; SEC/Big East Invitational	W 77–68	7–1	US Bank Arena (5,922); Cincinnati, OH
December 20*; 2:00 pm, FSN	No. 9	vs. Minnesota; 2008 Stadium Shootout	L 64–70	7–2	University of Phoenix Stadium (10,431); Glendale, AZ
December 27*; 4:00 pm, ESPN2	No. 19	UAB	W 82–62	8–2	Freedom Hall (19,627); Louisville, KY
December 31*; 6:00 pm, ESPN2	No. 18	UNLV	L 55–56	8–3	Freedom Hall (19,314); Louisville, KY
January 4*; 4:30 pm, CBS	No. 18	Kentucky; Battle for the Bluegrass	W 74–71	9–3	Freedom Hall (20,078); Louisville, KY
Big East regular season
January 7; 7:00 pm, ESPN2	No. 23	at South Florida	W 71–57	10–3 (1–0)	USF Sun Dome (4,827); Tampa, FL
January 10; 12:00 pm, ESPN	No. 23	at No. 17 Villanova	W 61–60	11–3 (2–0)	Wachovia Center (17,117); Philadelphia, PA
January 12; 7:00 pm, ESPN	No. 20	No. 12 Notre Dame	W 87–73 ^{OT}	12–3 (3–0)	Freedom Hall (19,865); Louisville, KY
January 17; 6:00 pm, ESPN	No. 20	No. 1 Pittsburgh	W 69–63	13–3 (4–0)	Freedom Hall (20,082); Louisville, KY
January 21; 7:00 pm, ESPNU	No. 9	at Rutgers	W 78–59	14–3 (5–0)	Rutgers Athletic Center (5,178); Piscataway, NJ
January 25; 12:00 pm, Big East Network/ESPN Full Court/WHAS	No. 9	at No. 8 Syracuse	W 67–57	15–3 (6–0)	Carrier Dome (25,721); Syracuse, NY
January 28; 7:00 pm, Big East Network/ESPN Full Court/WHAS	No. 7	South Florida	W 80–54	16–3 (7–0)	Freedom Hall (17,184); Louisville, KY
January 31; 12:00 pm, Big East Network/ESPN Full Court/WHAS	No. 7	West Virginia	W 69–63	17–3 (8–0)	Freedom Hall (19,416); Louisville, KY
February 2; 7:00 pm, ESPN	No. 5	No. 1 Connecticut	L 51–68	17–4 (8–1)	Freedom Hall (20,069); Louisville, KY
February 8; 1:30 pm, Big East Network/ESPN Full Court/WHAS	No. 5	at St. John's	W 60–47	18–4 (9–1)	Madison Square Garden (6,128); New York, NY
February 12; 7:00 pm, ESPN	No. 5	at Notre Dame	L 57–90	18–5 (9–2)	Edmund P. Joyce Center (11,418); Notre Dame, IN
February 15; 4:00 pm, ESPNU	No. 5	DePaul	W 99–54	19–5 (10–2)	Freedom Hall (19,332); Louisville, KY
February 18; 7:30 pm, ESPN2	No. 7	Providence	W 94–76	20–5 (11–2)	Freedom Hall (19,484); Louisville, KY
February 21; 2:00 pm, Big East Network/ESPN Full Court/WHAS	No. 7	at Cincinnati	W 72–63	21–5 (12–2)	Fifth Third Arena (12,350); Cincinnati, OH
February 23; 7:00 pm, ESPN	No. 6	at Georgetown	W 76–58	22–5 (13–2)	Verizon Center (12,653); Washington, DC
March 1; 12:00 pm, CBS	No. 6	No. 8 Marquette	W 62–58	23–5 (14–2)	Freedom Hall (20,079); Louisville, KY
March 4; 7:00 pm, Big East Network/ESPN Full Court/WHAS	No. 6	Seton Hall	W 95–78	24–5 (15–2)	Freedom Hall (19,535); Louisville, KY
March 7; 9:00 pm, ESPN	No. 6	at West Virginia; ESPN College GameDay	W 62–59	25–5 (16–2)	WVU Coliseum (13,089); Morgantown, WV
Big East tournament
March 12; 12:00 pm, ESPN	No. 5	vs. Providence; Quarterfinals	W 73–55	26–5	Madison Square Garden (19,375); New York, NY
March 13; 7:00 pm, ESPN	No. 5	vs. No. 10 Villanova; Semifinals	W 69–55	27–5	Madison Square Garden (19,375); New York, NY
March 14; 9:00 pm, ESPN	No. 5	vs. No. 18 Syracuse; Final	W 76–66	28–5	Madison Square Garden (19,375); New York, NY
NCAA tournament
March 20*; 7:10 pm, CBS	No. 1-M	vs. No. 16-M Morehead State; First Round	W 74–54	29–5	University of Dayton Arena (12,499); Dayton, OH
March 22*; 5:20 pm, CBS	No. 1-M	vs. No. 9-M Siena; Second Round	W 79–72	30–5	University of Dayton Arena (12,596); Dayton, OH
March 27*; 7:07 pm, CBS	No. 1-M	vs. No. 12-M Arizona; Sweet Sixteen	W 103–64	31–5	Lucas Oil Stadium (33,780); Indianapolis, IN
March 29*; 2:20 pm, CBS	No. 1-M	vs. No. 2-M Michigan State; Elite Eight	L 52–64	31–6	Lucas Oil Stadium (36,084); Indianapolis, IN
*Non-conference game. ^{#}Rankings from AP Poll. (#) Tournament seedings in parentheses. All times are in Eastern Time † NCAA Tournament ranks are seeds in the region (E=East, M=Midwest, S=South, W=West).

== Rankings ==
Ranking movements Legend: ██ Increase in ranking ██ Decrease in ranking т = Tied with team above or below ( ) = First-place votes
	Week																			
Poll	Pre	1	2	3	4	5	6	7	8	9	10	11	12	13	14	15	16	17	18	Final
AP	3	3	3	11	9	9	19	18	24	20	9	7	5	5	7	6	6	5 (1)	1 (45)	Not released
Coaches	3	3	3	11	10	9	19	18 т	21	20	12	7	7	7	7	6	6	5	1 (14)	5
