= 2008–09 St. John's Red Storm men's basketball team =

American college basketball season

2008–09 St. John's Red Storm men's basketball

CBI First Round vs. Richmond, L 69–75
- Conference: Big East Conference
- Record: 16–18 (6–12 Big East)
- Head coach: Norm Roberts (5th year)
- Assistant coaches: Glenn Braica; Chris Casey; Fred Quartlebaum
- Home arena: Carnesecca Arena; Madison Square Garden

2008–09 Big East men's basketball standings
	Conf.				Overall
Team	W		L	PCT	W		L	PCT
No. 1 Louisville†	16	–	2	.889	31	–	6	.838
No. 4 Pittsburgh	15	–	3	.833	31	–	5	.861
No. 5 Connecticut	15	–	3	.833	31	–	5	.861
No. 11 Villanova	13	–	5	.722	30	–	8	.789
No. 23 Marquette	12	–	6	.667	25	–	10	.714
No. 13 Syracuse	11	–	7	.611	28	–	10	.737
West Virginia	10	–	8	.556	23	–	12	.657
Providence	10	–	8	.556	19	–	14	.576
Notre Dame	8	–	10	.444	21	–	15	.583
Cincinnati	8	–	10	.444	18	–	14	.563
Seton Hall	7	–	11	.389	17	–	15	.531
Georgetown	7	–	11	.389	16	–	15	.516
St. John's	6	–	12	.333	16	–	18	.471
South Florida	4	–	14	.222	9	–	22	.290
Rutgers	2	–	16	.111	11	–	21	.344
DePaul	0	–	18	.000	9	–	24	.273
† 2009 Big East tournament winner As of April 4, 2009; Rankings from AP Poll

The 2008–09 St. John's Red Storm men's basketball team represented St. John's University during the 2008–09 NCAA Division I men's basketball season. The team was coached by Norm Roberts in his fifth year at the school. St. John's home games are played at Carnesecca Arena and Madison Square Garden and the team is a member of the Big East Conference.

== Off season ==
=== Departures ===
Name	Number	Pos.	Height	Weight	Year	Hometown	Notes
Eugene Lawrence	4	PG	6'1"	210	Senior	Brooklyn, New York	Graduated
Larry Wright	5	SG	6'2"	172	Sophomore	Saginaw, Michigan	Transferred to Oakland
Liam Biesty	30	G	6'0"	185	Senior	Brooklyn, New York	Graduated
Mike Cavataio	32	SG	6'4"	190	Freshman	Forest Hills, New York	Transferred to Holy Cross
Otoja Abit	33	F	6'6"	195	Senior	Woodside, New York	Graduated

=== Class of 2008 signees ===
College recruiting information
Name	Hometown	School	Height	Weight	Commit date
Quincy Roberts; SG	Harrisburg, PA	Harrisburg High School	6 ft 5 in (1.96 m)	185 lb (84 kg)	Apr 29, 2008
Quincy Roberts; SG	Recruit ratings: Scout: Rivals: 247Sports: (78)				
TyShwan Edmondson; PG	Hopkinsville, KY	University Heights Academy	6 ft 4 in (1.93 m)	180 lb (82 kg)	Apr 30, 2008
TyShwan Edmondson; PG	Recruit ratings: Scout: Rivals: 247Sports: (NR)				
Phil Wait; C	Manchester, ENG	Proctor Academy	7 ft 1 in (2.16 m)	265 lb (120 kg)	Jun 5, 2008
Phil Wait; C	Recruit ratings: Scout: 247Sports: (NR)				
Overall recruit ranking:
Note: In many cases, Scout, Rivals, 247Sports, On3, and ESPN may conflict in their listings of height and weight.; In these cases, the average was taken. ESPN grades are on a 100-point scale.; Sources: "2008 Team Ranking". Rivals.

== Roster ==
2008–09 St. John's Red Storm men's basketball team
Players
Coaches

Pos.	#	Name	Height	Weight	Year	Previous school	Hometown
G/F	1	D.J. Kennedy	6 ft 5 in (1.96 m)	214 lb (97 kg)	So	Schenley	Pittsburgh, PA
F	2	Anthony Mason Jr. (redshirt)	6 ft 7 in (2.01 m)	213 lb (97 kg)	Sr	Failey	Memphis, TN
G	3	Malik Boothe	5 ft 9 in (1.75 m)	184 lb (83 kg)	So	Christ the King	Queens, NY
G	4	John Taubeneck (W)	5 ft 11 in (1.8 m)	165 lb (75 kg)	Jr	Roger Williams	Salem, MA
F	5	Sean Evans	6 ft 8 in (2.03 m)	259 lb (117 kg)	So	Northeast	Philadelphia, PA
G	10	Quincy Roberts	6 ft 5 in (1.96 m)	196 lb (89 kg)	Fr	Harrisburg	Harrisburg, PA
C	11	Tomas Jasiulionis	6 ft 11 in (2.11 m)	249 lb (113 kg)	Sr	Trinity Episcopal	Utena, Lithuania
G	12	TyShwan Edmondson	6 ft 4 in (1.93 m)	175 lb (79 kg)	Fr	University Heights	Hopkinsville, KY
F/C	15	Dele Coker	6 ft 10 in (2.08 m)	257 lb (117 kg)	So	South Kent	Lagos, Nigeria
G	23	Paris Horne	6 ft 3 in (1.91 m)	189 lb (86 kg)	So	Bridgton Academy	Middletown, DE
F	24	Justin Burrell	6 ft 8 in (2.03 m)	244 lb (111 kg)	So	Bridgton Academy	Bronx, NY
G	35	Matt Duell (W)	5 ft 9 in (1.75 m)	155 lb (70 kg)	Jr	Greenport	Orient, NY
G	42	Kevin Clark (W)	6 ft 2 in (1.88 m)	204 lb (93 kg)	So	Dunmore	Dunmore, PA
C	50	Phil Wait	7 ft 1 in (2.16 m)	245 lb (111 kg)	Fr	Proctor Academy	Manchester, England
F	55	Rob Thomas	6 ft 6 in (1.98 m)	247 lb (112 kg)	RS So	South Kent	Harlem, NY

Head coach

- Norm Roberts (Queens College)

Assistant coach(es)

- Glenn Braica
- Chris Casey
- Fred Quartlebaum

Legend

- (C) Team captain
- (S) Suspended
- (I) Ineligible
- (W) Walk-on
- Injured
- Current redshirt

== Schedule and results ==
Date time, TV	Rank^{#}	Opponent^{#}	Result	Record	Site (attendance) city, state
Regular Season
11/14/08*; 9:00pm, SNY		LIU Brooklyn	W 73–63	1–0	Carnesecca Arena (4,914); Queens, NY
11/17/08*; 9:30pm		vs. Cornell; NIT Season Tip-Off First Round	W 86–75	2–0	Conte Forum (4,283); Chestnut Hill, MA
11/18/08*; 7:30pm		vs. Boston College; NIT Season Tip-Off Quarterfinals	L 70–82	2–1	Conte Forum (4,462); Chestnut Hill, MA
11/22/08*; 2:00pm		Howard	W 79–44	3–1	Carnesecca Arena (3,153); Queens, NY
11/24/08*; 8:00pm		Eastern Michigan; NIT Season Tip-Off Consolation	W 73–61	4–1	Carnesecca Arena (893); Queens, NY
11/25/08*; 8:00pm		Loyola (IL); NIT Season Tip-Off Consolation	W 73–54	5–1	Carnesecca Arena (959); Queens, NY
12/01/08*; 7:30pm		St. Francis (NY)	W 69–61	6–1	Carnesecca Arena (2,960); Queens, NY
12/08/08*; 7:30pm		NJIT	W 82–54	7–1	Carnesecca Arena (808); Queens, NY
12/14/08*; 4:00pm		Bethune-Cookman	W 77–59	8–1	Carnesecca Arena (3,053); Queens, NY
12/20/08*; 4:30pm, MSG		Marist; Aeropostale Holiday Festival Opening Round	W 65–44	9–1	Madison Square Garden (4.713); New York, NY
12/21/08*; 2:30pm, MSG		Virginia Tech; Aeropostale Holiday Festival Championship	L 67–81	9–2	Madison Square Garden (N/A); New York, NY
12/27/08*; 12:00pm, ESPNU		Miami (FL)	L 56–70	9–3	Madison Square Garden (4,998); New York, NY
12/31/08; 4:00pm, SNY		at Providence	L 54–75	9–4 (0–1)	Dunkin' Donuts Center (3,087); Providence, RI
01/03/09; 2:00pm, ESPNU		No. 7 Notre Dame	W 71–65	10–4 (1–1)	Madison Square Garden (9,807); New York, NY
01/11/09; 12:00pm, ESPNU		at No. 1 Pittsburgh	L 67–90	10–5 (1–2)	Petersen Events Center (12,508); Pittsburgh, PA
01/15/09; 7:00pm, ESPN		No. 4 Connecticut	L 55–67	10–6 (1–3)	Madison Square Garden (7,545); New York, NY
01/18/09; 12:00pm, SNY		at No. 23 Villanova	L 57–76	10–7 (1–4)	The Pavilion (6,500); Villanova, PA
01/22/09; 9:00pm, ESPNU		Cincinnati	L 60–71	10–8 (1–5)	Carnesecca Arena (4,123); Queens, NY
01/24/09; 7:00pm, MSG+		Rutgers	W 70–59	11–8 (2–5)	Carnesecca Arena (7,890); Queens, NY
01/28/09; 7:00pm, SNY		at West Virginia	L 52–75	11–9 (2–6)	WVU Coliseum (6,583); Morgantown, WV
02/01/09; 2:00pm, ESPNU		South Florida	W 65–48	12–9 (3–6)	Carnesecca Arena (3,872); Queens, NY
02/05/09; 9:00pm, ESPN		at Seton Hall	L 81–91	12–10 (3–7)	Prudential Center (7,314); Newark, NJ
02/08/09; 1:30pm, MSG		No. 5 Louisville	L 47–60	12–11 (3–8)	Madison Square Garden (6,128); New York, NY
02/11/09; 7:30pm, ESPN 360		at Cincinnati	L 61–71	12–12 (3–9)	Fifth Third Arena (8,159); Cincinnati, OH
02/14/09; 9:00pm, SNY		at No. 10 Marquette	L 59–73	12–13 (3–10)	Bradley Center (18,614); Milwaukee, WI
02/19/09*; 7:00pm, SNY		No. 9 Duke; Aeropostale Classic	L 69–76	12–14 (3–10)	Madison Square Garden (13,800); New York, NY
02/22/09; 5:00pm, SNY		Seton Hall	W 70–65	13–14 (4–10)	Carnesecca Arena (5,602); Queens, NY
02/24/09; 7:30pm, MSG		Syracuse	L 58–87	13–15 (4–11)	Madison Square Garden (11,148); New York, NY
02/28/09; 12:00pm, SNY		at DePaul	W 84–63	14–15 (5–11)	Allstate Arena (9,814); Rosemont, IL
03/03/09; 7:30pm, MSG		Georgetown	W 59–56 ^{OT}	15–15 (6–11)	Madison Square Garden (N/A); New York, NY
03/06/09; 7:00pm, MSG		at Notre Dame	L 55–74	15–16 (6–12)	Joyce Convocation Center (11,028); Notre Dame, IN
Big East tournament
03/10/09; 2:00pm		Georgetown	W 64–59	16–16 (6–12)	Madison Square Garden (19,375); New York, NY
03/11/09; 2:00pm		No. 21 Marquette	L 45–74	16–17 (6–12)	Madison Square Garden (19,375); New York, NY
CBI Tournament
03/18/09*; 7:00pm		at Richmond; First Round	L 69–75	16–18 (6–12)	Robins Center (2,171); Richmond, VA
*Non-conference game. ^{#}Rankings from AP Poll. (#) Tournament seedings in parentheses.
