= Fred Hill (basketball) =

American basketball player

Biographical details
- Born: March 26, 1959 (age 67); Verona, New Jersey, U.S.

Playing career
- 1977–1981: Montclair State
- Position: Guard

Coaching career (HC unless noted)
- 1981–1982: Montclair State (asst.)
- 1982–1983: Lehigh (asst.)
- 1983–1986: Rider (asst.)
- 1986–1988: Marquette (asst.)
- 1988–1991: Maine (asst.)
- 1991–1998: Fairleigh Dickinson (asst.)
- 1998–2001: Seton Hall (asst.)
- 2001–2005: Villanova (asst.)
- 2005–2006: Rutgers (asst.)
- 2006–2010: Rutgers
- 2011–2013: Northwestern (asst.)
- 2013–2018: Seton Hall (asst.)

Head coaching record
- Overall: 47–77 (.379)

Fred Hill Jr. (born March 26, 1959) is an American college basketball coach, most recently an assistant coach for the Seton Hall Pirates men's basketball team. He had previously served as the head men's basketball coach at Rutgers University. His father is Rutgers baseball coach Fred Hill Sr. and his uncle, Brian Hill is a former NBA coach.

Raised in Verona, New Jersey, Hill graduated from Verona High School in 1977.

Hill had a 47–77 record in four years at Rutgers. He recruited and lost 12 players including Mike Rosario, the first McDonald's All American in Rutgers history.

Despite a losing record, Hill had been told after the 2009–10 season that he would return for a fifth season. However, on April 1, Hill got into a shouting match with Pittsburgh baseball coaches after a game between the Panthers and Scarlet Knights. When athletic director Tim Pernetti learned about it, he ordered Hill to stay away from the remaining games of the Panthers-Scarlet Knights series. Hill showed up for the next day's game, prompting an investigation by Pernetti. After the investigation, Pernetti told Hill he would not be allowed to return. After protracted negotiations, Hill was allowed to resign in return for an $850,000 settlement.

== Head coaching record ==
Record table
Season	Team	Overall	Conference	Standing	Postseason
Rutgers Scarlet Knights (Big East Conference) (2006–2010)
2006–07	Rutgers	10–19	3–13	T–14th	
2007–08	Rutgers	11–20	3–15	T–15th	
2008–09	Rutgers	11–21	2–16	15th	
2009–10	Rutgers	15–17	5–13	14th	
Rutgers:		47–77 (.379)	13–57 (.186)		
Total:		47–77 (.379)			
