= 2008–09 Cincinnati Bearcats men's basketball team =

American college basketball season

2008–09 Cincinnati Bearcats men's basketball
- Conference: Big East Conference (1979–2013)
- Record: 18–14 (8–10 Big East)
- Head coach: Mick Cronin (3rd season)
- Assistant coaches: Larry Davis (3rd season); Chris Goggin (3rd season); Tony Stubblefield (3rd season)
- Home arena: Fifth Third Arena

2008–09 Big East men's basketball standings
	Conf.				Overall
Team	W		L	PCT	W		L	PCT
No. 1 Louisville†	16	–	2	.889	31	–	6	.838
No. 4 Pittsburgh	15	–	3	.833	31	–	5	.861
No. 5 Connecticut	15	–	3	.833	31	–	5	.861
No. 11 Villanova	13	–	5	.722	30	–	8	.789
No. 23 Marquette	12	–	6	.667	25	–	10	.714
No. 13 Syracuse	11	–	7	.611	28	–	10	.737
West Virginia	10	–	8	.556	23	–	12	.657
Providence	10	–	8	.556	19	–	14	.576
Notre Dame	8	–	10	.444	21	–	15	.583
Cincinnati	8	–	10	.444	18	–	14	.563
Seton Hall	7	–	11	.389	17	–	15	.531
Georgetown	7	–	11	.389	16	–	15	.516
St. John's	6	–	12	.333	16	–	18	.471
South Florida	4	–	14	.222	9	–	22	.290
Rutgers	2	–	16	.111	11	–	21	.344
DePaul	0	–	18	.000	9	–	24	.273
† 2009 Big East tournament winner As of April 4, 2009; Rankings from AP Poll

The 2008–09 Cincinnati Bearcats men's basketball team represented the University of Cincinnati during the 2008–09 NCAA Division I men's basketball season. The team played its home games in Cincinnati, Ohio at the Fifth Third Arena, which has a capacity of 13,176. They are members of the Big East Conference. The Bearcats finished the season 18–14, 8–10 in Big East play and were upset in the first round of the 2009 Big East men's basketball tournament by the 16th seed DePaul.

== Offseason ==
=== Departing players ===
Name	Number	Pos.	Height	Weight	Year	Hometown	Notes
Marvin Gentry	1	G	6'3"	180	Senior	Fort Worth, Texas	Graduated
Marcus Sikes	10	F	6'8"	230	Senior	Richmond, Virginia	Graduated
Jamual Warren	32	G	6'2"	195	Senior	Springfield, Massachusetts	Graduated
Adam Hrycaniuk	34	C	6'10"	230	Senior	Mysliborz, Poland	Graduated
John Williamson	45	F	6'6"	225	Senior	Columbus, Ohio	Graduated

=== Incoming transfers ===
Name	Pos.	Height	Weight	Year	Hometown	Notes
Steven Toyloy	F	6'3"	255	Junior	West Palm Beach, FL	Junior college transferred from Miami Dade College

=== Recruiting class of 2008 ===
College recruiting information
Name	Hometown	School	Height	Weight	Commit date
Yancy Gates; PF	Cincinnati, Ohio	Withrow High School	6 ft 8 in (2.03 m)	250 lb (110 kg)	Apr 15, 2007
Yancy Gates; PF	Recruit ratings: Rivals: 247Sports: (96)				
Cashmere Wright; PG	Savannah, Georgia	Urban Christian Academy	6 ft 0 in (1.83 m)	170 lb (77 kg)	Aug 16, 2007
Cashmere Wright; PG	Recruit ratings: Rivals: 247Sports: (93)				
Dion Dixon; SG	Chicago, Illinois	Crane High School	6 ft 3 in (1.91 m)	180 lb (82 kg)	Mar 2, 2008
Dion Dixon; SG	Recruit ratings: Rivals: 247Sports: (NR)				
Overall recruit ranking: 247Sports: 38
Note: In many cases, Scout, Rivals, 247Sports, On3, and ESPN may conflict in their listings of height and weight.; In these cases, the average was taken. ESPN grades are on a 100-point scale.; Sources: "2008 Cincinnati Basketball Commits". ESPN.; "2008 Team Ranking". Rivals.

=== Recruiting class of 2009 ===
College recruiting information (2009)
Name	Hometown	School	Height	Weight	Commit date
Sean Kilpatrick; SG	White Plains, New York	Notre Dame Prep	6 ft 4 in (1.93 m)	210 lb (95 kg)	
Sean Kilpatrick; SG	Recruit ratings: Scout: Rivals: 247Sports: (87)				
JaQuon Parker; PG	Suffolk, Virginia	King's Fork High School	6 ft 4 in (1.93 m)	200 lb (91 kg)	Jun 2, 2009
JaQuon Parker; PG	Recruit ratings: Scout: Rivals: 247Sports: (89)				
Lance Stephenson; G	Brooklyn, New York	Abraham Lincoln High School	6 ft 6 in (1.98 m)	195 lb (88 kg)	Jun 30, 2009
Lance Stephenson; G	Recruit ratings: Scout: Rivals: 247Sports: (97)				
Overall recruit ranking: 247Sports: 45
Note: In many cases, Scout, Rivals, 247Sports, On3, and ESPN may conflict in their listings of height and weight.; In these cases, the average was taken. ESPN grades are on a 100-point scale.; Sources: "Cincinnati 2009 Player Commits". ESPN.; "2009 Team Ranking". Rivals.

== Roster ==
2008–09 Cincinnati Bearcats men's basketball team
Players
Coaches

Pos.	#	Name	Height	Weight	Year	Previous school	Hometown
G	1	Cashmere Wright (redshirt)	6 ft 0 in (1.83 m)	175 lb (79 kg)	Fr	Urban Christian Academy	Savannah, Georgia
G	2	Eddie Tyree (W)	5 ft 10 in (1.78 m)	180 lb (82 kg)	Jr	Thomas More	Columbus, Ohio
G	3	Dion Dixon	6 ft 3 in (1.91 m)	195 lb (88 kg)	Fr	Crane High School	Chicago, Illinois
G	5	Deonta Vaughn (C)	6 ft 1 in (1.85 m)	190 lb (86 kg)	Jr	Harmony Community School	Indianapolis, Indiana
G	11	Larry Davis	6 ft 3 in (1.91 m)	185 lb (84 kg)	So	Alief Hastings High School	Houston, Texas
F	15	Darnell Wilks	6 ft 7 in (2.01 m)	205 lb (93 kg)	So	Pioneer Christian Academy	Nashville, Tennessee
G	20	Branden Miller (W)	6 ft 4 in (1.93 m)	210 lb (95 kg)	Sr	Indian Hill High School	Cincinnati, Ohio
F	21	Mike Williams	6 ft 7 in (2.01 m)	240 lb (109 kg)	RS Sr	Texas	Camden, Alabama
F	22	Rashad Bishop	6 ft 6 in (1.98 m)	220 lb (100 kg)	So	Kennedy High School	Paterson, New Jersey
F	23	Alvin Mitchell	6 ft 5 in (1.96 m)	215 lb (98 kg)	So	Cardinal Gibbons High School	Ft. Lauderdale, Florida
C	30	Anthony McClain	7 ft 0 in (2.13 m)	290 lb (132 kg)	So	National Christian Academy	Trenton, New Jersey
F	32	Kenny Belton (injured)	6 ft 8 in (2.03 m)	255 lb (116 kg)	So	Dudley High School	Salem, Virginia
F	34	Yancy Gates	6 ft 9 in (2.06 m)	260 lb (118 kg)	Fr	Withrow High School	Cincinnati, Ohio
C	42	Steve Toyloy	6 ft 8 in (2.03 m)	255 lb (116 kg)	Jr	Miami Dade College	West Palm Beach, Florida

Head coach

- Mick Cronin (Cincinnati)

Assistant coach(es)

- Chris Goggin (Cincinnati)
- Larry Davis (Asbury)
- Tony Stubblefield (Omaha)

Legend

- (C) Team captain
- (S) Suspended
- (I) Ineligible
- (W) Walk-on
- Injured
- Current redshirt

Roster
Last update: 15 May 2020

=== Depth chart ===
Pos.	Starting 5	Bench 1	Bench 2
C	Yancy Gates	Steve Toyloy	Anthony McClain
PF	Mike Williams	Alvin Mitchell
SF	Rashad Bishop	Darnell Wilks
SG	Larry Davis	Branden Miller
PG	Deonta Vaughn	Dion Dixon

== Schedule and results ==
Date time, TV	Rank^{#}	Opponent^{#}	Result	Record	Site (attendance) city, state
Exhibition
November 1, 2008*; 1:00pm		Carleton	W 64–54		Fifth Third Arena; Cincinnati, OH
November 11, 2008*; 7:30pm		Northern Kentucky	W 73–61		Fifth Third Arena; Cincinnati, OH
Non-Conference Regular Season
November 16, 2008*; 6:00pm		South Dakota	W 69–62	1–0	Fifth Third Arena (6,199); Cincinnati, OH
November 18, 2008*; 7:30pm		Texas Southern	W 82–51	2–0	Fifth Third Arena (6,180); Cincinnati, OH
November 22, 2008*; 12:00pm		Western Illinois; Global Sports Classic	W 74–46	3–0	Fifth Third Arena; Cincinnati, OH
November 24, 2008*; 7:30pm		Coastal Carolina; Global Sports Classic	W 82–56	4–0	Fifth Third Arena; Cincinnati, OH
November 28, 2008*; 10:30pm		vs. Florida State; Global Sports Classic	L 47–58 ^{OT}	4–1	Thomas & Mack Center; Las Vegas, NV
November 29, 2008*; 8:00pm		vs. UNLV; Global Sports Classic	W 67–65	5–1	Thomas & Mack Center; Las Vegas, NV
December 6, 2008*; 12:00pm		UAB	W 87–80	6–1	Fifth Third Arena; Cincinnati, OH
December 13, 2008*; 7:00pm		No. 10 Xavier; Crosstown Shootout	L 66–76	6–2	Fifth Third Arena; Cincinnati, OH
December 15, 2008*; 7:20pm		Charleston Southern	W 74–55	7–2	Fifth Third Arena; Cincinnati, OH
December 18, 2008*; 6:30pm, ESPN		vs. Mississippi State; SEC–Big East Challenge	W 75–63	8–2	U.S. Bank Arena; Cincinnati, OH
December 20, 2008*; 6:30pm		Eastern Kentucky	W 85–77 ^{OT}	9–2	Fifth Third Arena; Cincinnati, OH
December 22, 2008; 7:30pm		Arkansas–Pine Bluff	W 79–49	10–2	Fifth Third Arena; Cincinnati, OH
December 29, 2008*; 9:00pm		at Memphis; Rivalry	L 45–60	10–3	FedEx Forum; Memphis, TN
Big East Regular Season
January 4, 2009; 2:00pm		at Marquette	L 50–84	10–4 (0–1)	Bradley Center; Milwaukee, WI
January 7, 2009; 7:00pm		Providence	L 79–87	10–5 (0–2)	Fifth Third Arena; Cincinnati, OH
January 10, 2009; 4:30pm		No. 5 Connecticut	L 72–81	10–6 (0–3)	Fifth Third Arena; Cincinnati, OH
January 14, 2009; 7:30pm		Rutgers	W 71–59	11–6 (1–3)	Fifth Third Arena; Cincinnati, OH
January 17, 2009; 2:00pm		at DePaul	W 59–55	12–6 (2–3)	Allstate Arena; Rosemont, IL
January 19, 2009; 8:00pm		at Providence	L 63–72	12–7 (2–4)	Dunkin Donuts Center; Providence, RI
January 22, 2009; 9:00pm		at St. John's	W 71–60	13–7 (3–4)	Madison Square Garden; New York, NY
January 28, 2009; 7:30pm		No. 25 Georgetown	W 65–57	14–7 (4–4)	Fifth Third Arena; Cincinnati, OH
February 1, 2009; 12:00pm		at No. 21 Villanova	L 50–71	14–8 (4–5)	The Pavilion; Villanova, PA
February 4, 2009; 7:30pm		Notre Dame	W 93–83	15–8 (5–5)	US Bank Arena; Cincinnati, OH
February 7, 2009; 12:00pm		at Georgetown	W 64–62	16–8 (6–5)	Verizon Center; Washington, D.C.
February 11, 2009; 7:30pm		St. John's	W 71–61	17–8 (7–5)	Fifth Third Arena; Cincinnati, OH
February 14, 2009; 4:00pm		at No. 4 Pittsburgh	L 69–85	17–9 (7–6)	Petersen Events Center; Pittsburgh, PA
February 21, 2009; 2:00pm		No. 7 Louisville; Rivalry	L 63–72	17–10 (7–7)	Fifth Third Arena; Cincinnati, OH
February 26, 2009; 7:00pm		West Virginia	W 65–61	18–10 (8–7)	Fifth Third Arena; Cincinnati, OH
March 1, 2009; 2:00pm		at Syracuse	L 63–87	18–11 (8–8)	Carrier Dome; Syracuse, NY
March 3, 2009; 7:00pm		at South Florida	L 59–70	18–12 (8–9)	USF Sun Dome; Tampa, FL
March 7, 2009; 12:00pm		Seton Hall	L 63–67 ^{OT}	18–13 (8–10)	Fifth Third Arena; Cincinnati, OH
Big East tournament
March 10, 2009; 12:00pm	(9)	vs. (16) DePaul; First Round	L 57–67	18–14	Madison Square Garden; New York, NY
*Non-conference game. ^{#}Rankings from AP Poll. (#) Tournament seedings in parentheses.

== Awards and milestones ==
=== Big East Conference honors ===
==== All-Big East Third Team ====
- Deonta Vaughn

==== Big East All-Rookie Team ====
- Yancy Gates

== Rankings ==
Ranking movements Legend: — = Not ranked
	Week																			
Poll	Pre	1	2	3	4	5	6	7	8	9	10	11	12	13	14	15	16	17	18	Final
AP	—	—	—	—	—	—	—	—	—	—	—	—	—	—	—	—	—	—	—	—
Coaches Poll	—	—	—	—	—	—	—	—	—	—	—	—	—	—	—	—	—	—	—	—
