= Gabriel Bernon =

French Huguenot merchant and refugee

Gabriel Bernon (April 6, 1644 – February 1, 1736) was a French Huguenot merchant and refugee who attempted to found a settlement in Oxford, Massachusetts for fellow refugees.

Bernon was born in La Rochelle, France at a time when the city was the site of religious civil war. After the revocation of the Edict of Nantes in 1685, Bernon fled to Amsterdam, and then London with the idea of founding an American settlement of Huguenot refugees. In 1688 he arrived in Boston and began establishing the fort settlement along what is now known as the French River to locals. After confrontations with Native tribes, Bernon was forced to abandon the settlement and relocate to Rhode Island, where he went on to take an interest in both shipbuilding and the church. A devout church member, he was active in establishing churches across Rhode Island, including Trinity Church and St. John's Church.
