= Clara Barton Homestead =

Historic house museum in Massachusetts, US

- U.S. National Register of Historic Places
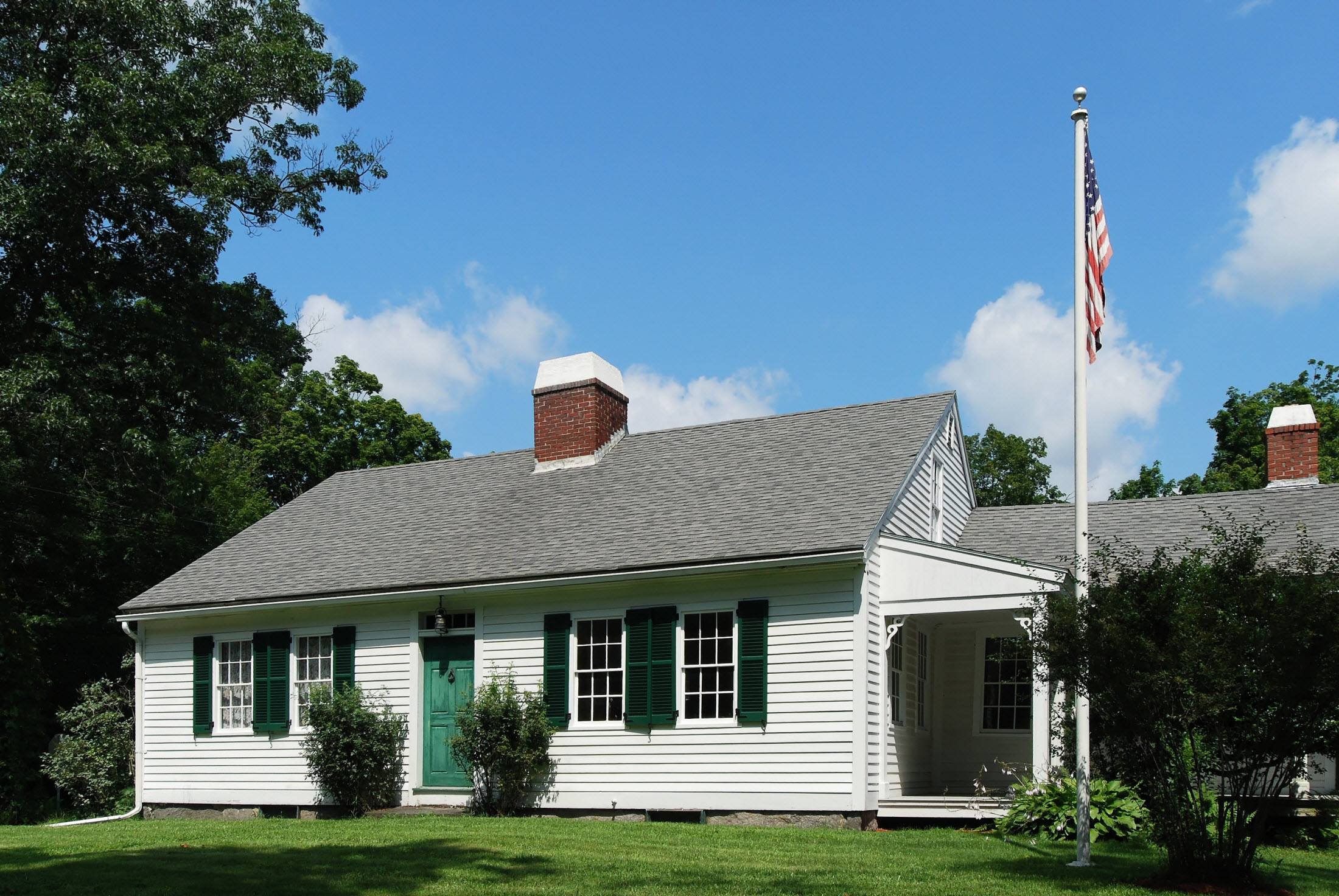

- Location within Massachusetts Location within the United States
- Location: 60 Clara Barton Rd., Oxford, Massachusetts
- Coordinates: 42°9′12″N 71°53′45″W
- Area: 0.8 acres (0.32 ha)
- Built: 1818
- NRHP reference No.: 77000202
- Added to NRHP: September 22, 1977

The Clara Barton Homestead, also known as the Clara Barton Birthplace Museum, is a historic house museum at 60 Clara Barton Road in Oxford, Massachusetts. The museum celebrates the life and activities of Clara Barton (1821–1912), founder of the American Red Cross. The property was listed on the National Register of Historic Places in 1977. The museum is open seasonally, or by appointment. It has been restored to the period when Barton lived there.

== Description and history ==
The Clara Barton Homestead is located in northern Oxford, on the grounds of the Barton Center for Diabetes Education at the northeast corner of Clara Barton and Ennis Roads. It is a 1 1/2-story Cape style wood-frame structure, with a gabled roof, central chimney, and clapboarded exterior. Its main facade is five bays wide, with sash windows arranged symmetrically around the center entrance. The entrance is simply framed, with a transom window above. A single-story ell extends to the right at a setback, with a porch at the joining corner. A 19th-century barn stands to the right of the house.

The house was built in 1818 by Stephen Barton, and was where Clara Barton was born in 1821. Barton lived here until 1853. In 1921, it was purchased by the Unitarian-Universalist Federation of Women, who established it as a museum in her honor. The surrounding property has since been developed as part of the Barton Center, which provides a summer camp environment for children with diabetes.

== See also ==
- National Register of Historic Places listings in Worcester County, Massachusetts
