= Oxford High School (Massachusetts) =

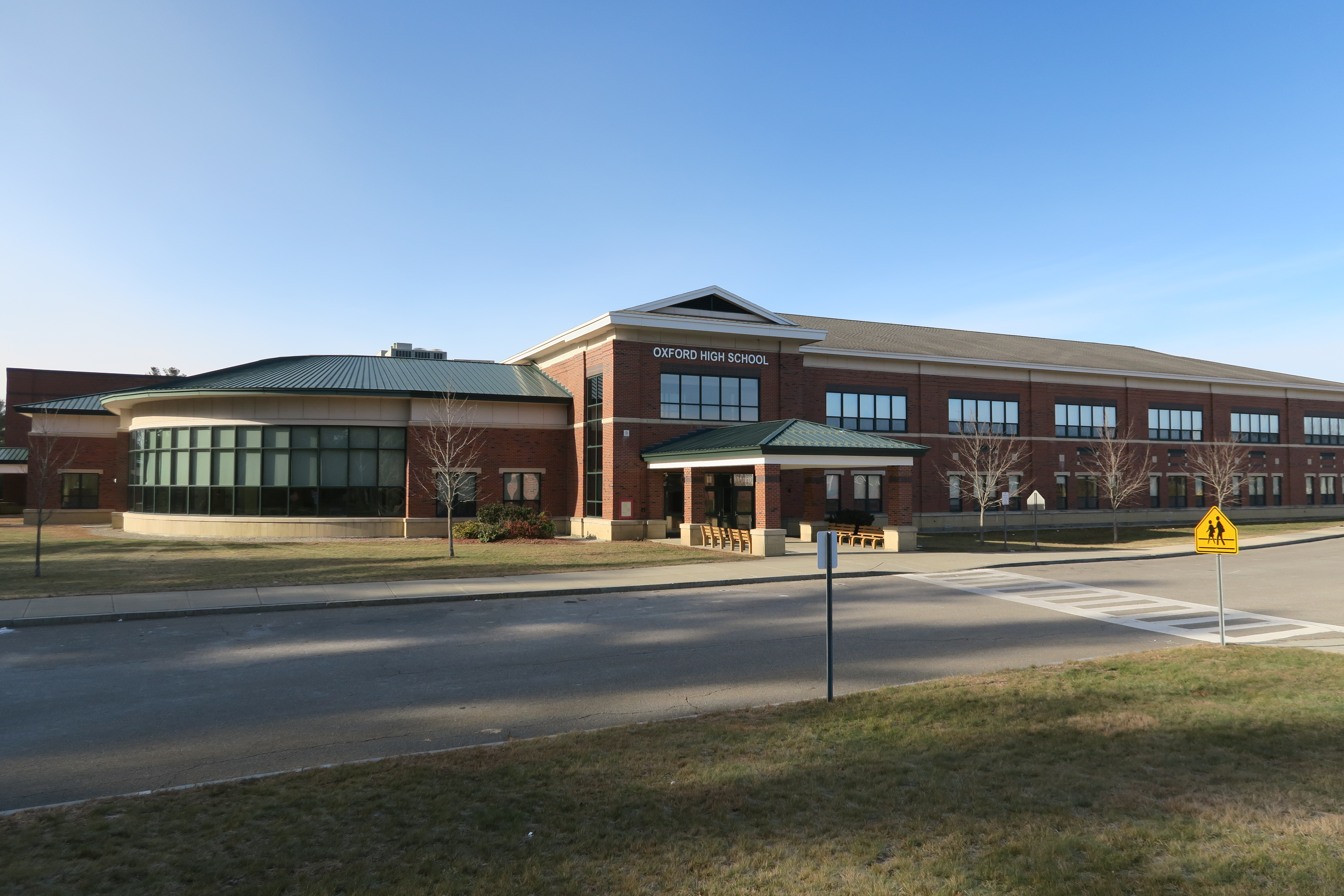
- View of Oxford High School in 2016.

Location
- 100 Carbuncle Drive; Oxford, Massachusetts 01540; United States; 42°08′12.69″N 71°52′20.52″W

Information
- Type: Public
- Established: 1906 (Old Building) 2002 (New Building)
- School district: Oxford Public Schools
- Superintendent: Michael Lucas
- Principal: Rebecca Czernicki
- Teaching staff: 43.86 (FTE)
- Grades: 9–12
- Enrollment: 453 (2024–2025)
- Student to teacher ratio: 10.33
- Colours: Orange and Black
- Athletics conference: Central Massachusetts Athletic Conference
- Team name: Pirates
- Website: ohs.oxps.org

Oxford High School is a public high school in Oxford, Massachusetts. The school is operated by the Oxford Public Schools district. Before the new building on Carbuncle Drive, the original Oxford High on Main Street was designed in 1906 by the architecture firm Cutting, Carleton & Cutting.

== Curriculum ==
Oxford High offers three levels of courses for its students: college and career prep (CCSP), honors (H), and Advanced Placement (AP). For the latter, the school offers AP courses in biology, calculus, English literature, and United States history. All students are required to complete four years of English, mathematics, and physical education, as well as three years of social studies and science and two years of either Spanish or French.

The school offers extracurricular activities such as skiing, band, theater, and chorus, as well as a Gay-Straight Alliance, which focuses on the acceptance of all community members. Additionally, there is a Junior Reserve Officers' Training Corps program that is affiliated with the United States Navy.

== Athletics ==
Athletic teams at Oxford High are named the Pirates. The school offers sports including: baseball, basketball, cheerleading, cross country, field hockey, football, golf, soccer, softball, track and field, and volleyball.

== Notable alumni ==
- Carla Berube (1993), college basketball player and coach
- Tom Herrion (1985), college basketball coach
- Corey Hetherman (2003), college football coach
- Tony Reno (1993), college football coach
- Etta Riel (1932), disappeared person

== See also ==
- List of high schools in Massachusetts
