= National First Aid Society =

National First Aid Society was founded in 1905 by Clara Barton after her resignation from the American Red Cross. Its mission was to promote local first aid programs. It later became part of the American Red Cross.
