= Clara Barton =

American Civil War nurse and founder of the American Red Cross (1821–1912)

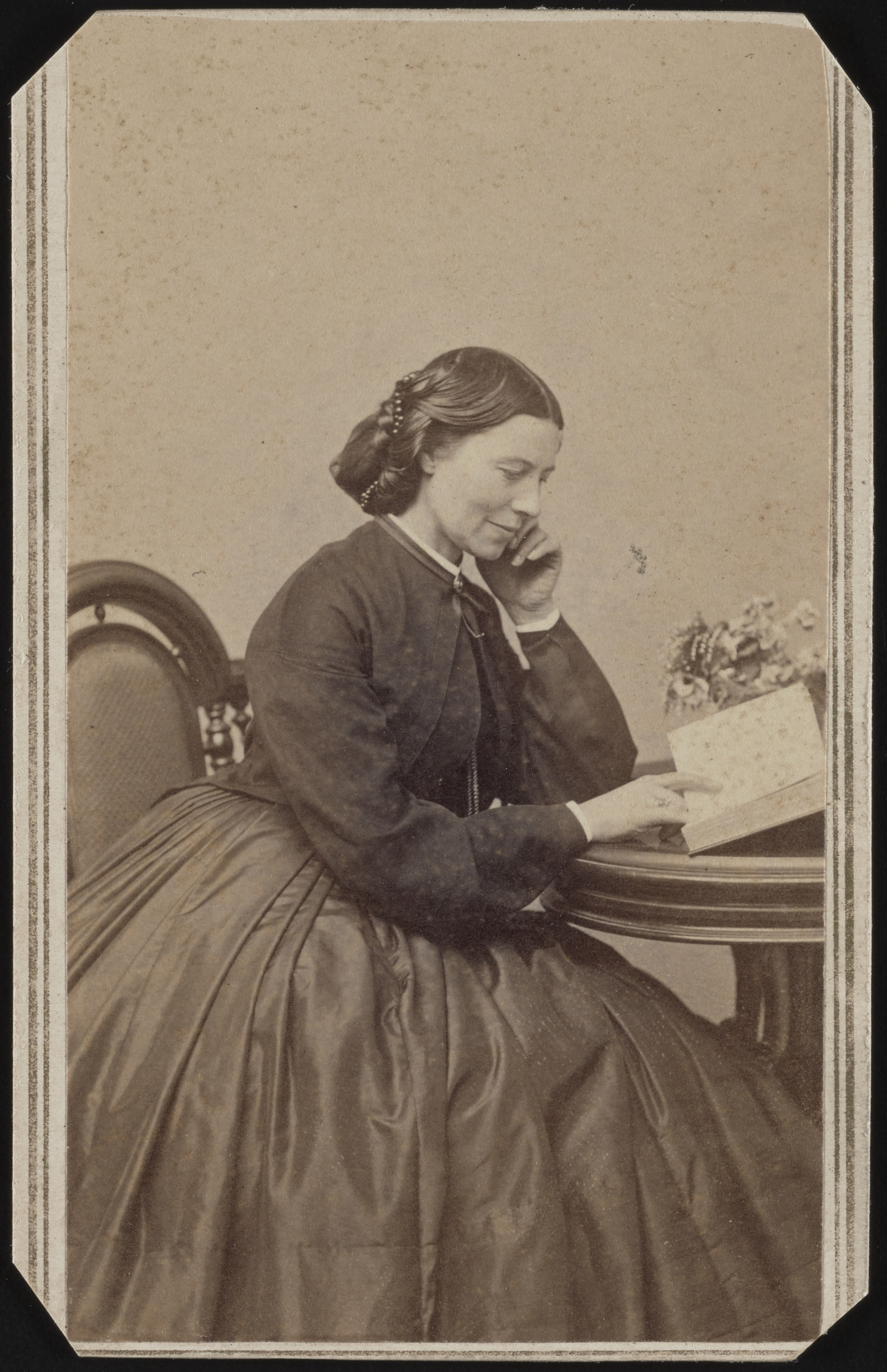
- Barton in 1865
- Born: Clarissa Harlowe Barton; December 25, 1821; Oxford, Massachusetts, U.S.
- Died: April 12, 1912 (aged 90); Glen Echo, Maryland, U.S.
- Resting place: North Cemetery in Oxford, Massachusetts, U.S.
- Occupations: Nurse, humanitarian, founder and first president of the American Red Cross
- Relatives: Elvira Stone (cousin)

Clarissa Harlowe Barton (December 25, 1821 – April 12, 1912) was an American nurse who founded the American Red Cross. She was a hospital nurse in the American Civil War, a teacher, and a patent clerk. Since nursing education was not very formalized, and she did not attend nursing school, she provided self-taught nursing care. Barton is noteworthy for doing humanitarian work and civil rights advocacy at a time before women had the right to vote. She was inducted into the National Women's Hall of Fame in 1973.

== Early life ==
Barton was born in Oxford, Massachusetts, a small farming community. She was named after her father's sister, Clarissa Harlow Barton. Her father was Captain Stephen Barton, a member of the local militia and a selectman who influenced his daughter's patriotism and humanitarianism. He was a soldier under the command of General Anthony Wayne in his violent removal of Indigenous peoples in the Northwest Territory. He was also the leader of progressive thought in the Oxford village area. Barton's mother was Sarah Stone Barton. Through her grandmother Dorothy Moore Barton, Barton was the great niece of Martha Moore Ballard, midwife, nurse and diarist.

In 1825, when she was three years old, Barton was sent to school with her brother Stephen, where she reportedly excelled in reading and spelling. At school, she became close friends with Nancy Fitts. Barton was very timid as a child, and Fitts was her only known childhood friend.

Beginning in 1833, when Barton was eleven years old, she acted as a nurse to her brother David for two years after he fell from the roof of a barn and suffered a severe head injury. In nursing her brother, she learned how to deliver prescription medications and perform the practice of bloodletting, in which blood was removed from the patient by leeches attached to the skin. David eventually made a full recovery.

Clara Barton's parents tried to encourage her to be more outgoing by enrolling her in Colonel Stones High School, but Barton became more timid and depressed and would not eat. She was brought back home to regain her health.

When she returned, Barton's family moved to help the widow of Barton's cousin, who had been left to manage four children and a farm after the death of her husband. Barton helped to perform maintenance and repair work on the home her family was going to live in. After the work was done, she was very concerned about being a burden to her family. Therefore, she began to play with her male cousins, participating in their activities, such as horseback riding. When Barton injured herself, her mother decided that she should focus on developing more traditionally feminine skills and invited a female cousin to help develop Barton's femininity.

To assist Barton in overcoming her shyness, her parents persuaded her to become a schoolteacher. She studied at the Clinton Liberal Institute in Clinton, New York. She achieved her first teacher's certificate in 1839, at 17 years old. Barton led an effective redistricting campaign that allowed the children of workers to receive an education.

== Early professional life ==
Barton became an educator in 1838 and served for 11 years in schools in and around Oxford, Massachusetts. Barton fared well as a teacher; she knew how to handle children, particularly the boys since as a child she enjoyed her boy cousins' and brothers' company. She learned how to act like them, making it easier for her to relate to and control the boys in her care. After her mother's death in 1851, the family home closed down. Barton decided to further her education by pursuing writing and languages at the Clinton Liberal Institute in New York. In this college, she developed many friendships that broadened her point of view on many issues concurring at the time. The principal of the institute recognized her tremendous abilities and admired her work. This friendship lasted for many years, eventually turning into a romance. As a writer, her terminology was pristine and easy to understand. Her writings and bodies of work could instruct the local statesmen.

While teaching in Hightstown, Barton learned about the lack of public schools in Bordentown, the neighboring city. In 1852, she was contracted to open a free school in Bordentown, which was the first ever free school in New Jersey. She was successful, and after a year she had hired another woman to help teach over 600 people. Both women were making $250 a year. This accomplishment compelled the town to raise nearly $4,000 for a new school building. Once it was completed, Barton was replaced as principal by a man elected by the school board. They saw the position as head of a large institution to be unfitting for a woman. She was demoted to "female assistant" and worked in a harsh environment until she had a nervous breakdown along with other health ailments, and quit.

In 1855, she moved to Washington, D.C., and began work as a clerk in the U.S. Patent Office; this was the first time a woman had received a substantial clerkship in the federal government and at a salary equal to a man's salary. For three years, she received much abuse and slander from male clerks. Subsequently, under political opposition to women working in government offices, her position was reduced to that of copyist, and in 1858, under the administration of James Buchanan, she was fired because of her "Black Republicanism". After the election of Abraham Lincoln, having lived with relatives and friends in Massachusetts for three years, she returned to the patent office in the autumn of 1860, now as temporary copyist, in the hope she could make way for more women in government service.

== American Civil War ==
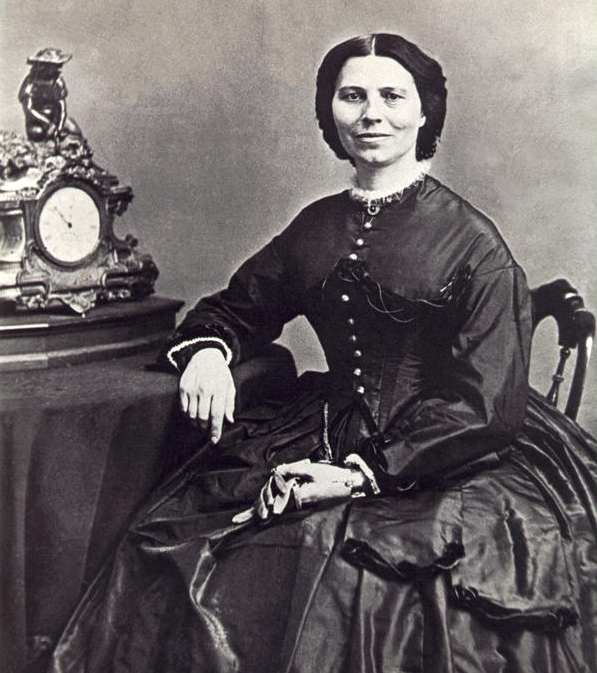
Barton c. 1866

On April 19, 1861, the Baltimore Riot resulted in the first bloodshed of the American Civil War. The victims, members of the 6th Massachusetts Militia, were transported after the violence to the unfinished Capitol Building in Washington, D.C., where Barton lived at the time. Wanting to serve her country, Barton went to the railroad station when the victims arrived and nursed 40 men. Barton provided crucial, personal assistance to the men in uniform, many of whom were wounded, hungry and without supplies other than what they carried on their backs. She personally took supplies to the building to help the soldiers.

Barton quickly recognized them, as she had grown up with some of them and even taught some. Barton, along with several other women, personally provided clothing, food, and supplies for the sick and wounded soldiers. She learned how to store and distribute medical supplies and offered emotional support to the soldiers by keeping their spirits high. She would read books to them, write letters to their families for them, talk to them, and support them.

It was on that day that she identified herself with army work and began her efforts towards collecting medical supplies for the Union soldiers. Prior to distributing provisions directly onto the battlefield and gaining further support, Barton used her own living quarters as a storeroom and distributed supplies with the help of a few friends in early 1862, despite opposition in the War Department and among field surgeons. Ladies' Aid Society helped in sending bandages, food, and clothing that would later be distributed during the Civil War. In August 1862, Barton finally gained permission from Quartermaster Daniel Rucker to work on the front lines. She gained support from other people who believed in her cause. These people became her patrons, her most supportive being Senator Henry Wilson of Massachusetts.

After the First Battle of Bull Run, Barton placed an ad in a Massachusetts newspaper for supplies; the response was a profound influx of supplies. She worked to distribute stores, clean field hospitals, apply dressings, and serve food to wounded soldiers in close proximity to several battles, including Cedar Mountain, Second Bull Run, Antietam, and Fredericksburg. Barton helped both Union and Confederate soldiers. Supplies were not always readily available though. At the battle of Antietam, for example, Barton used corn-husks in place of bandages. Speaking of her commitment to being a nurse in the war after experiencing battle, Clara would say, "I shall remain here while anyone remains, and do whatever comes to my hand. I may be compelled to face danger, but never fear it, and while our soldiers can stand and fight, I can stand and feed and nurse them."

In April 1863, Barton accompanied her brother David to Port Royal, South Carolina, in the Union-occupied Sea Islands after he was appointed as a quartermaster within the Union Navy. Clara Barton resided in the Sea Islands until early 1864. While in South Carolina, she became friends with prominent abolitionist and feminist Frances Dana Barker Gage, who had traveled south to educate formerly enslaved people (see Port Royal Experiment). Barton also became acquainted with Jean Margaret Davenport, an actress from England, who was then residing on the Sea Islands with her husband, Union General Frederick W. Lander. Barton provided medical care to the Black soldiers of the 54th Massachusetts Regiment following their attack on Fort Wagner. Additionally, she traveled to Morris Island to nurse Union soldiers there, accompanied by a Black woman named Betsey who worked under Barton during her time in the Sea Islands. She quarreled with General Quincy Adams Gillmore after he suddenly ordered her to evacuate her post at Morris Island. Also in the Sea Islands, she became acquainted with a Union officer, Colonel John J. Elwell. Historian Stephen B. Oates claims that Barton and Elwell had a romantic and sexual relationship.

In 1864, she was appointed by Union General Benjamin Butler as the "lady in charge" of the hospitals at the front of the Army of the James. Among her more harrowing experiences was an incident in which a bullet tore through the sleeve of her dress without striking her and killed a man to whom she was tending. She was known as the "Florence Nightingale of America". She was also known as the "Angel of the Battlefield" after she came to the aid of the overwhelmed surgeon on duty following the battle of Cedar Mountain in Northern Virginia in August 1862. She arrived at a field hospital at midnight with a large number of supplies to help the severely wounded soldiers. This naming came from her frequent timely assistance as she served troops at the battles of Fairfax Station, Chantilly, Harpers Ferry, South Mountain, Antietam, Fredericksburg, Charleston, Petersburg and Cold Harbor.

== Post-war ==
After the end of the American Civil War, Barton discovered that thousands of letters from distraught relatives to the War Department were going unanswered because the soldiers they were asking about were buried in unmarked graves. Many of the soldiers were labeled as "missing." Motivated to do more about the situation, Barton contacted President Lincoln in hopes that she would be allowed to respond officially to the unanswered inquiries. She was given permission, and "The Search for the Missing Men" commenced.

After the war, she ran the Office of Missing Soldiers, at 437 ½ Seventh Street, Northwest Washington, D.C., in the Gallery Place neighborhood. The office's purpose was to find or identify soldiers killed or missing in action. Barton and her assistants wrote 41,855 replies to inquiries and helped locate more than 22,000 missing men. Barton spent the summer of 1865 helping find, identify, and properly bury 13,000 individuals who died in Andersonville prison camp, a Confederate prisoner-of-war camp in Georgia. She continued this task over the next four years, burying 20,000 more Union soldiers and marking their graves. Congress eventually appropriated $15,000 toward her project.

== The American Red Cross ==
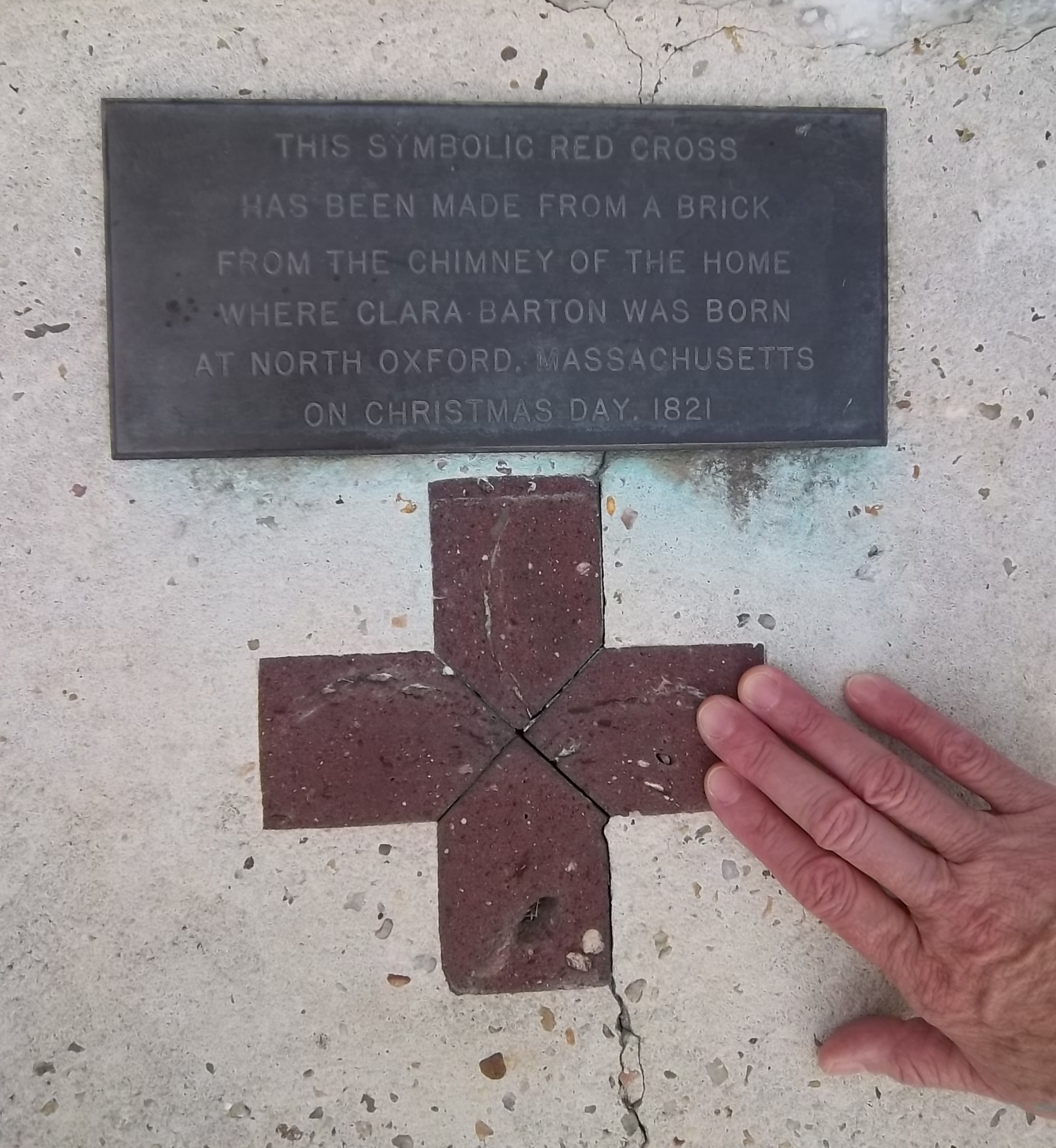
Detail of Clara Barton monument at Antietam National Battlefield, with red cross formed of a brick from the home where she was born

Clara Barton achieved widespread recognition by delivering lectures around the country about her war experiences from 1865 to 1868. During this time she met Susan B. Anthony and began an association with the woman's suffrage movement. She also became acquainted with Frederick Douglass and became an activist for civil rights. After her countrywide tour she was both mentally and physically exhausted and under doctor's orders to go somewhere that would take her far from her current work. She closed the Missing Soldiers Office in 1868 and traveled to Europe. In 1869, during her trip to Geneva, Switzerland, Barton was introduced to the Red Cross and Dr. Appia; he later would invite her to be the representative for the American branch of the Red Cross and help her find financial benefactors for the start of the American Red Cross. She was also introduced to Henry Dunant's book A Memory of Solferino, which called for the formation of national societies to provide relief voluntarily on a neutral basis.

In the beginning of the Franco-Prussian War, in 1870, she assisted the Grand Duchess of Baden in the preparation of military hospitals and gave the Red Cross society much aid during the war. At the joint request of the German authorities and the Strasbourg Comité de Secours, she superintended the supplying of work to the poor of Strasbourg in 1871, after the Siege of Paris, and in 1871 had charge of the public distribution of supplies to the destitute people of Paris. At the close of the war, she received honorable decorations of the Golden Cross of Baden and the Prussian Iron Cross.

When Barton returned to the United States, she inaugurated a movement to gain recognition for the International Committee of the Red Cross (ICRC) by the US government. In 1873, she began work on this project. In 1878, she met with President Rutherford B. Hayes, who expressed the opinion of most Americans at that time which was the US would never again face a calamity like the Civil War. Barton finally succeeded during the administration of President Chester Arthur, using the argument that the new American Red Cross could respond to crises other than war such as natural disasters like earthquakes, forest fires, and hurricanes.

Barton became President of the American branch of the society, which held its first official meeting at her apartment in Washington, DC, May 21, 1881. The first local society was founded August 22, 1881 in Dansville, Livingston County, New York, where she maintained a country home.

The society's role changed with the advent of the Spanish–American War during which it aided refugees and prisoners of the civil war. Once the Spanish–American War was over the grateful people of Santiago built a statue in honor of Barton in the town square, which still stands there today. In the United States, Barton was praised in numerous newspapers and reported about Red Cross operations in person.

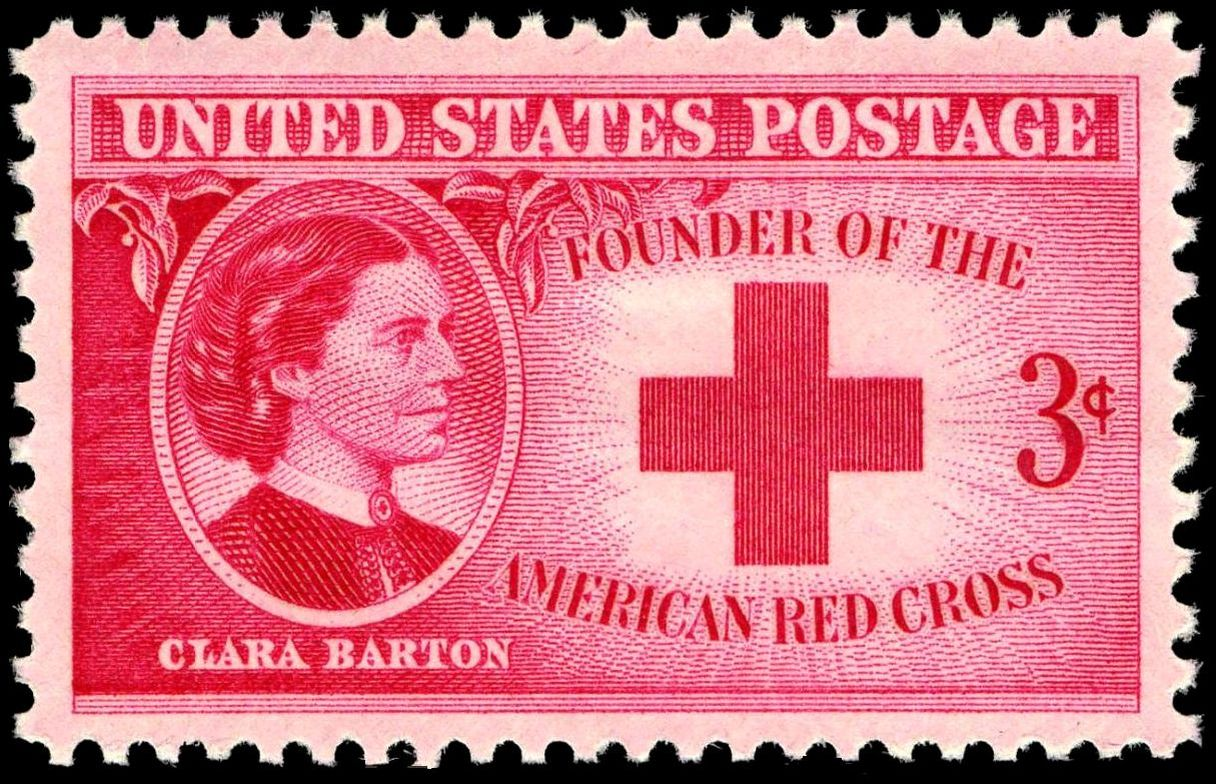
Clara Barton honored on a 1948 US commemorative stamp

Domestically in 1884 she helped in the floods on the Ohio river, provided Texas with food and supplies during the famine of 1887, took workers to Illinois in 1888 after a tornado, and that same year took workers to Florida for the yellow fever epidemic. The first major disaster for the Red Cross was the Johnstown Flood of 1889 in Pennsylvania, which killed more than 2,200 people. Within days of the flood, Barton led her delegation of 50 doctors and nurses in response. She stayed in Johnstown for five months, never once leaving the scene even for a day. The effort eventually founded what would become Conemaugh Health System.

In 1896, responding to the humanitarian crisis in the Ottoman Empire of the Hamidian massacres, Barton arrived in Constantinople February 15. Barton along with Minister Terrell spoke with Tewfik Pasha, the Turkish Minister of Foreign Affairs, to procure the right to enter the interior. Barton herself stayed in Constantinople to conduct the business of the expedition. Her General Field Agent, J. B. Hubbell, M.D.; two Special Field Agents, E. M. Wistar and C. K. Wood; and Ira Harris M. D., Physician in Charge of Medical Relief in Zeitoun and Marash, traveled to the Armenian provinces in the spring of 1896, providing relief and humanitarian aid to the Armenian population who were victims of the massacres done in 1894–1896 by Ottoman Empire. Barton also worked in hospitals in Cuba in 1898 at the age of 77. Barton's last field operation as President of the American Red Cross was helping victims of the Galveston hurricane in 1900. The operation established an orphanage for children.

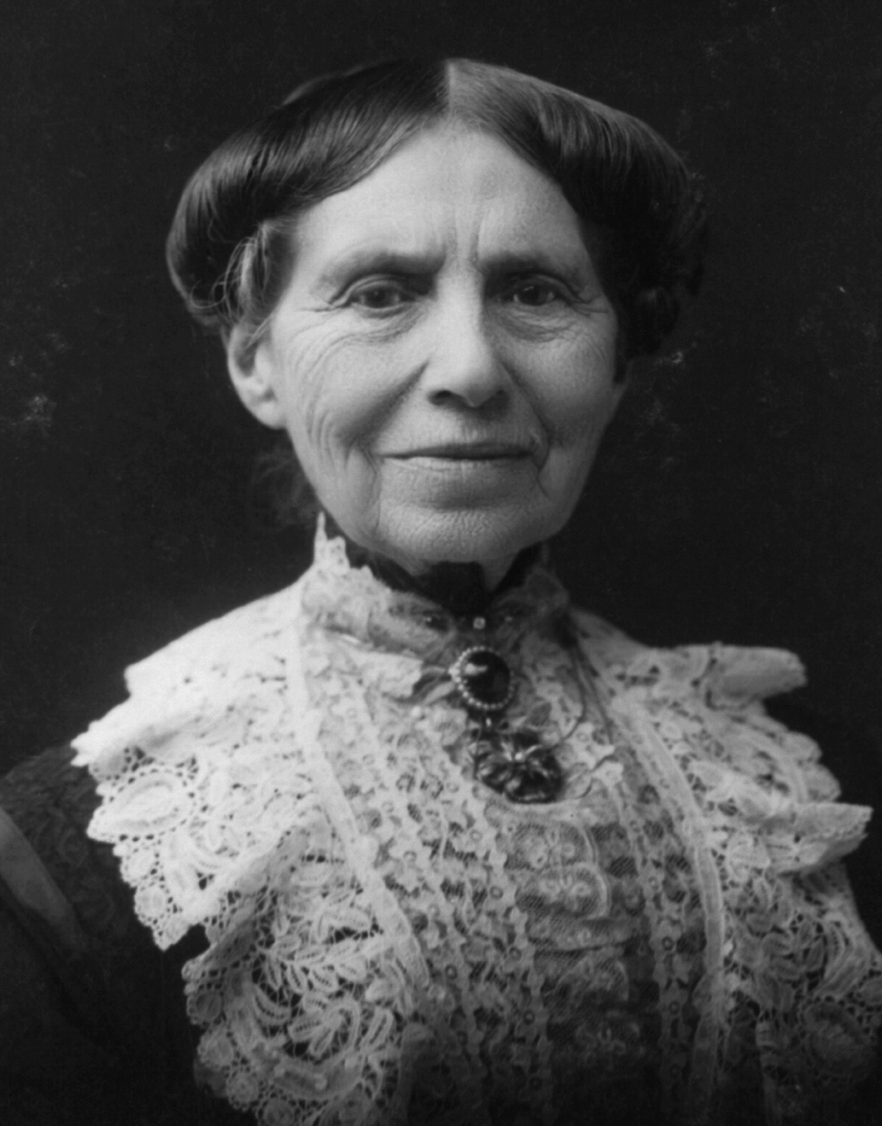
Photo by James E. Purdy (1904)

As criticism arose of her mixing professional and personal resources, Barton was forced to resign as president of the American Red Cross in 1904 at the age of 83 because her egocentric leadership style fit poorly into the formal structure of an organizational charity. She had been forced out of office by a new generation of all-male scientific experts who reflected the realistic efficiency of the Progressive Era rather than her idealistic humanitarianism. In memory of the courageous women of the civil war, the Red Cross Headquarters was founded. During the dedication, not one person said a word. This was done in order to honor the women and their services. After resigning, Barton founded the National First Aid Society.

== Final years ==
She continued to live in her Glen Echo, Maryland home which also served as the Red Cross Headquarters upon her arrival at the house in 1897. Barton published her autobiography in 1908, titled The Story of My Childhood. On April 12, 1912, she died in her home at the age of 90 due to pneumonia.

== Personal life and beliefs ==
Barton's wartime diary entries show she was a devout Christian. She specifically had a strong belief in divine providence, writing for instance that she "believed that Providence had ordained Lincoln's election." Upon hearing of the death of an acquaintance's child, she wrote, "God is great; and fearfully just, truly it is a fearful thing to fall into his hands. [H]is ways are past finding out." Furthermore, while reflecting on whether or not to return home early from her visit to the Sea Islands in 1863, she wrote, "Gods [sic] will not mine be done – I am content, how I wish I could always keep in full view the fact and feeling that God orders all things precisely as they should be – all is best as it is."

Although not formally a member of the Universalist Church of America, in a 1905 letter to the widow of Carl Norman Thrasher, she identified herself with her parents' church as a "Universalist".

My dear friend and sister:

Your belief that I am a Universalist is as correct as your greater belief that you are one yourself, a belief in which all who are privileged to possess it rejoice. In my case, it was a great gift, like St. Paul, I "was born free", and saved the pain of reaching it through years of struggle and doubt.

My father was a leader in the building of the church in which Hosea Ballow preached his first dedication sermon. Your historic records will show that the old Huguenot town of Oxford, Mass. erected one of, if not the first Universalist Church in America. In this town I was born; in this church I was reared. In all its reconstructions and remodelings I have taken a part, and I look anxiously for a time in the near future when the busy world will let me once more become a living part of its people, praising God for the advance in the liberal faith of the religions of the world today, so largely due to the teachings of this belief.

Give, I pray you, dear sister, my warmest congratulations to the members of your society. My best wishes for the success of your annual meeting, and accept my thanks most sincerely for having written me.

Fraternally yours, (Signed) Clara Barton.

While she was not an active member of her parents' church, Barton wrote about how well known her family was in her hometown and how many relationships her father formed with others in their town through their church and religion.

With regards to politics, Barton firmly supported President Lincoln and the Republican Party during the war. In 1863, she rebuffed a request from a Copperhead Democrat, T.W. Meighan, to denounce the Republican Party. In her letter to Meighan, Barton also stated, "I am a U.S. soldier you know [...] and, as I am a soldier, and not a statesman, I shall make no attempt at discussing political points with you." Further, she wrote that with regards to politics, "I am supposed to be profoundly ignorant." While the historian Stephen B. Oates reads these statements as ironic, this is disputed by Nina Silber (a historian of women in the Civil War era). Silber claims that "Clara Barton came to believe her job had very little to do with politics" and "emerged from the war more aware than ever of women's political weaknesses." While Oates labels Barton a "committed feminist", Silber compares her to other nurses such as Mary Ann Bickerdyke and Cornelia Hancock, who clung to patriarchal ideas of male hierarchical authority and the arrangement of "separate spheres" during the Civil War. Barton became a proponent of women's suffrage after conversing with her friend, Gage, on the topic.

Although Barton never married, she may have had romantic relationships with males at least during the Civil War years.

Barton was an admirer of the poetry of Lord Tennyson and Walter Scott.

== Clara Barton National Historic Site ==
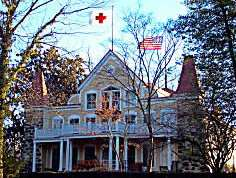
Clara Barton's home and site of American Red Cross.

In 1975, the Clara Barton National Historic Site, located at 5801 Oxford Road, Glen Echo, Maryland, was established as a unit of the National Park Service at Barton's home, where she spent the last 15 years of her life. As the first National Historic Site dedicated to the accomplishments of a woman, it preserves the early history of the American Red Cross, since the home also served as an early headquarters of the organization.

The National Park Service restored eleven rooms, including the Red Cross offices, the parlors, and Barton's bedroom. Visitors to the house were able to gain a sense of how Barton lived and worked. Guides led tourists through the three levels, emphasizing Barton's use of her unusual home. In October 2015 the site was closed for repairs and remained closed, due to the COVID-19 pandemic, through 2021. The house reopened to the public in 2022, although the second and third floors of the house remain closed, due to "structural concerns".

== Clara Barton's Missing Soldiers Office ==
In 1869, Barton closed the Missing Soldiers Office and headed to Europe. The third floor of her old boardinghouse was boarded up in 1913, and the site forgotten. The site was "lost" in part because Washington, DC realigned its addressing system in the 1870s. The boardinghouse became 437 ½ Seventh Street Northwest (formerly 488-1/2 Seventh Street West).

In 1997, General Services Administration carpenter Richard Lyons was hired to check out the building for its demolition. He found a treasure trove of Barton items in the attic, including signs, clothing, Civil War soldier's socks, an army tent, Civil War-era newspapers, and many documents relating to the Office of Missing Soldiers. This discovery led to the National Park Service saving the building from demolition. It took years, however, for the site to be restored. The Clara Barton's Missing Soldiers Office Museum, run by the National Museum of Civil War Medicine, opened in 2015.

== Fictional depictions ==
- Numbering All the Bones by Ann Rinaldi features Barton and Andersonville Prison, a Civil War prison with terrible conditions.
- Angel of Mercy (MGM, 1939) is a biographical short film directed by Edward L. Cahn, starring Sara Haden as Barton and Ann Rutherford as a woman whose brother's death in a Civil War battle inspires her to join Barton in her work.
- In the NBC TV series Voyagers! (1982–1983), Phineas Bogg and Jeffrey Jones travel through time to make sure history proceeds correctly. In the episode "The Travels of Marco ... and Friends", season 1, episode 9, original airdate December 3, 1982, Phineas and Jeffrey rescue Barton (Patricia Donahue) from a burning wagon, but she is on the verge of succumbing to smoke inhalation. Jeffrey (a young boy from 1982) applies mouth-to-mouth resuscitation (a technique unknown in Barton's time) and saves her life, thus enabling her to go on to found the American Red Cross.
- Mandy Moore plays Barton in an episode of Drunk History which features a summary of Barton's accomplishments during and after the Civil War as narrated by Amber Ruffin.
- America: The Motion Picture features a highly fictionalized version of Clara Barton as voiced by Megan Leahy.
- In the HBO series The Gilded Age (2022), Barton is played by Linda Emond.
- In Civil War on Sunday, the 21st book in the Magic Tree House series, main characters Jack and Annie meet and help Clara Barton in her work. Barton imparts some of her wisdom to them regarding how to help the wounded soldiers.

== Places named for Clara Barton ==
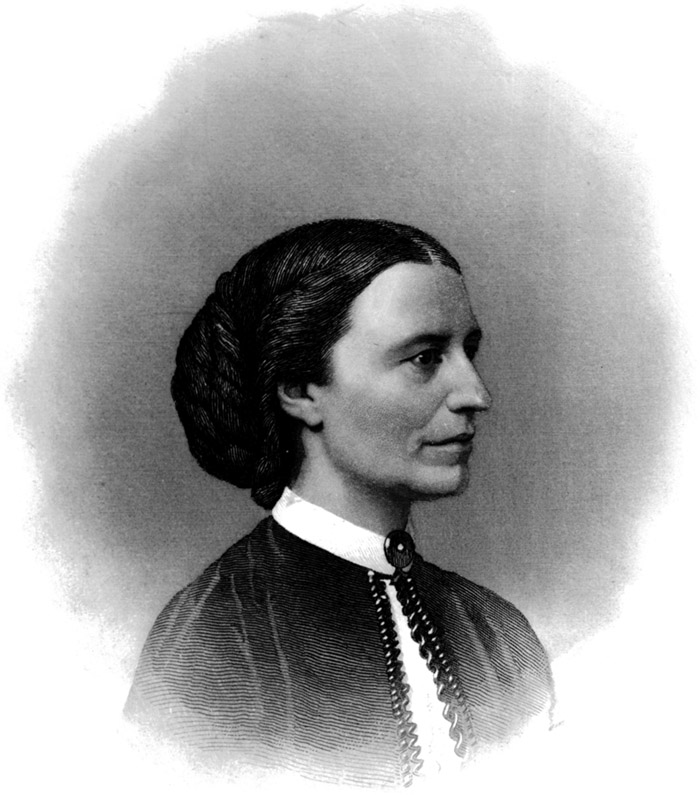
Clara Barton – steel engraving by John Sartain

=== Schools ===
There are 25 schools named after Clara Barton

- Clara Barton Elementary School in Fargo, North Dakota
- Clara Barton Elementary School in Levittown, Pennsylvania
- Barton Hall at Montclair State University in Upper Montclair, New Jersey
- Clara Barton Elementary on Del Amo Boulevard in Long Beach, California
- Clara Barton Elementary School in Alton, Illinois
- Clara Barton Elementary School in Redmond, Washington
- Clara Barton Elementary School in Milwaukee, Wisconsin
- Clara Barton Elementary School in Anaheim, California
- Barton County Community College in Great Bend, Kansas
- Clara Barton Elementary School in The Bronx
- Clara Barton Elementary School in Cherry Hill, New Jersey
- Clara Barton Elementary School in Chicago, Illinois
- Clara Barton Elementary School in Corona, California
- Clara Barton Elementary School in Oxford, Massachusetts
- Clara Barton Elementary School in San Diego (now San Diego Cooperative Charter School)
- Clara Barton Elementary School in Rochester, New York
- Clara Barton Elementary School in West Mifflin, Pennsylvania
- Clara Barton Junior High School in Royal Oak, Michigan
- Clara Barton High School for Health Professions in Brooklyn
- Clara Barton House, a residence hall at Towson University, Towson, Maryland
- Clara Barton Open School in Minneapolis
- Clara Barton School in Cabin John, Maryland (now Clara Barton Community Center)
- Clara Barton School in Bordentown, New Jersey
- Clara Barton School in Fargo, North Dakota
- Clara Barton School in Philadelphia
- Clara Barton School in Irvine, California

=== Streets ===
- Clara Barton Road in Oxford, Massachusetts
- Clara Barton Lane in Galveston, Texas
- Barton Boulevard in Rockledge, Florida
- Clara Barton Drive in Albany, New York
- Clara Barton Drive in Fairfax Station, Virginia
- Clara Barton Parkway in Maryland
- Clara Barton Street in Dansville, New York
- Clara Barton Boulevard in Garland, Texas
- Clara Barton Circle in Sylacauga, Alabama
- Clara Bartonstraat in Amsterdam
- Barton Road in Windsor, Maine
- Clara Barton Road in Douglas County, Wisconsin
- Clara Barton Street in Sagua la Grande, Cuba

=== Other ===
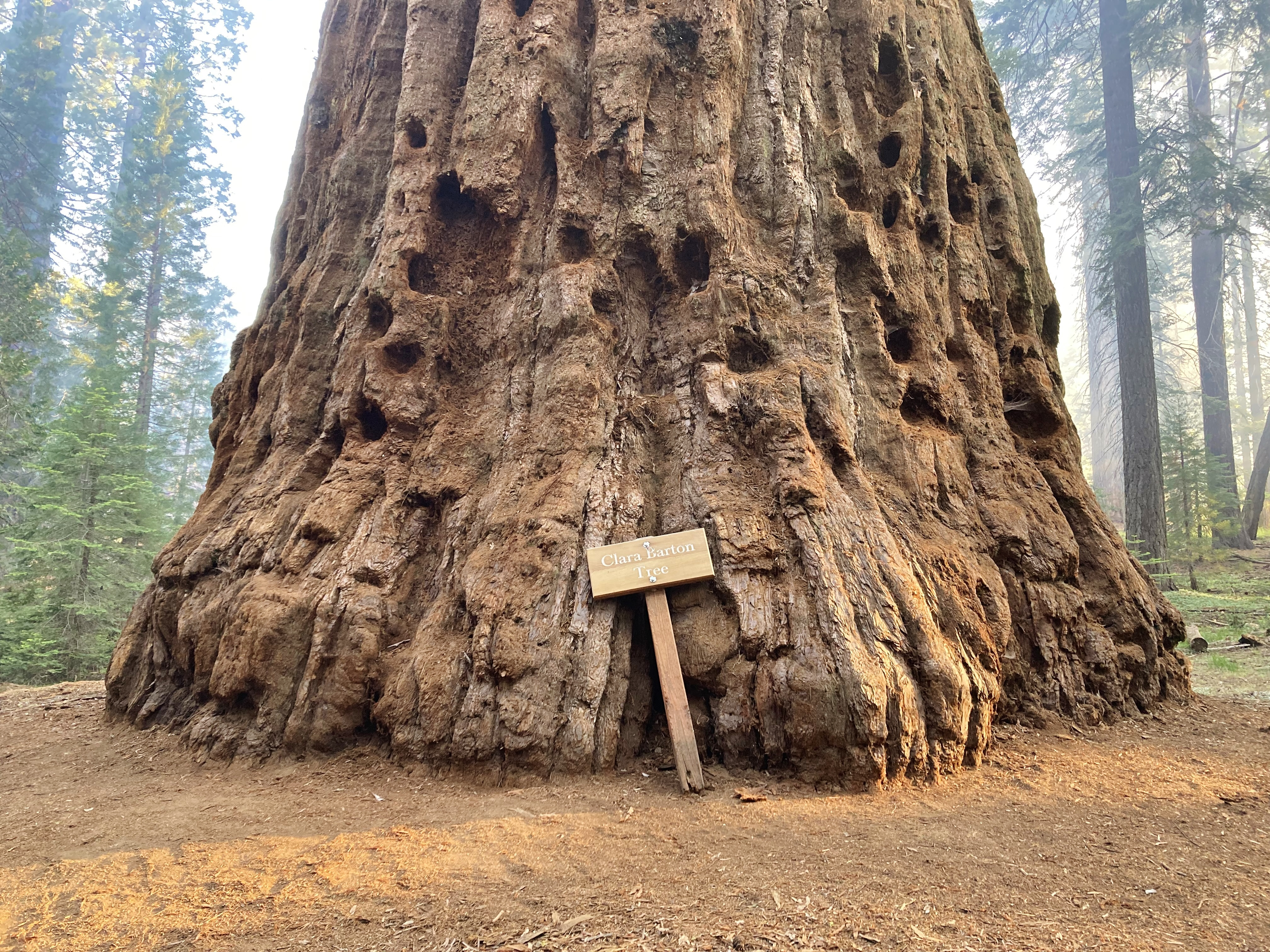
Clara Barton Tree, Sequoia National Park (June 2022)

- Barton, a crater on Venus
- Barton Associates, Peabody, Massachusetts
- Barton Center for Diabetes Education, North Oxford, Massachusetts
- Barton County, Kansas
- Barton Hall, Iowa State University
- Barton House in Towson University
- Barton Towers, in Royal Oak, Michigan, on the former site of Clara Barton Junior High School
- Barton's Crossing, Pittsfield, Massachusetts, a homeless shelter
- Clara Barton, a Norwegian Air Boeing 737-8MAX (part of Norwegian's "Tailfin Heroes" series)
- Clara Barton, New Jersey, an unincorporated community located within Edison Township
- Clara Barton Auditorium, United States Patent and Trademark Office, Alexandria, Virginia
- Clara Barton Community Center, Cabin John, Maryland
- Clara Barton District, a regional association of Unitarian Universalist Association member congregations
- Clara Barton First Aid Squad, Edison, New Jersey
- Clara Barton Library Branch, Edison, New Jersey
- Clara Barton Home and Gardens, Johnstown, Pennsylvania
- Clara Barton Hospital and Clinics, Hoisington, Kansas
- Clara Barton Memorial Forest in Lake Clear, New York, planted in 1925
- Clara Barton Post Office Building, at 14 Walnut Street in Bordentown, New Jersey
- Clara Barton Schoolhouse, in Bordentown, New Jersey
- Clara Barton Service Area, on the New Jersey Turnpike in Oldmans Township, New Jersey
- Clara Barton Shelter, Stony Brook State Park, Dansville, New York
- Clara Barton Tree, a giant sequoia tree in the Giant Forest, Sequoia National Park
- Heritage of Clara Barton, Edison, New Jersey, an Assisted Living Community
- Lake Barton in Burke, Virginia
- The House of Clara Barton at The King's College (New York City)

== Other remembrances ==
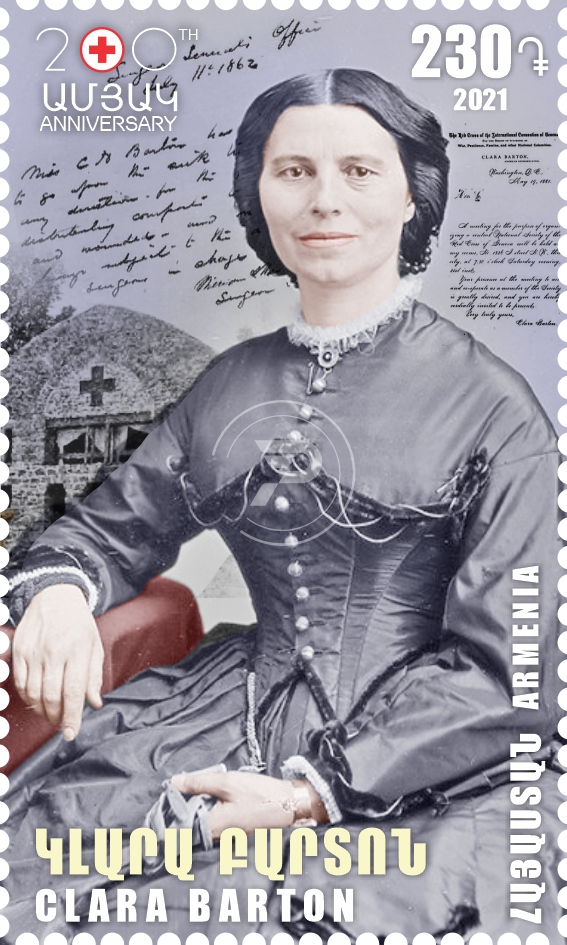
Barton on a 2021 stamp of Armenia

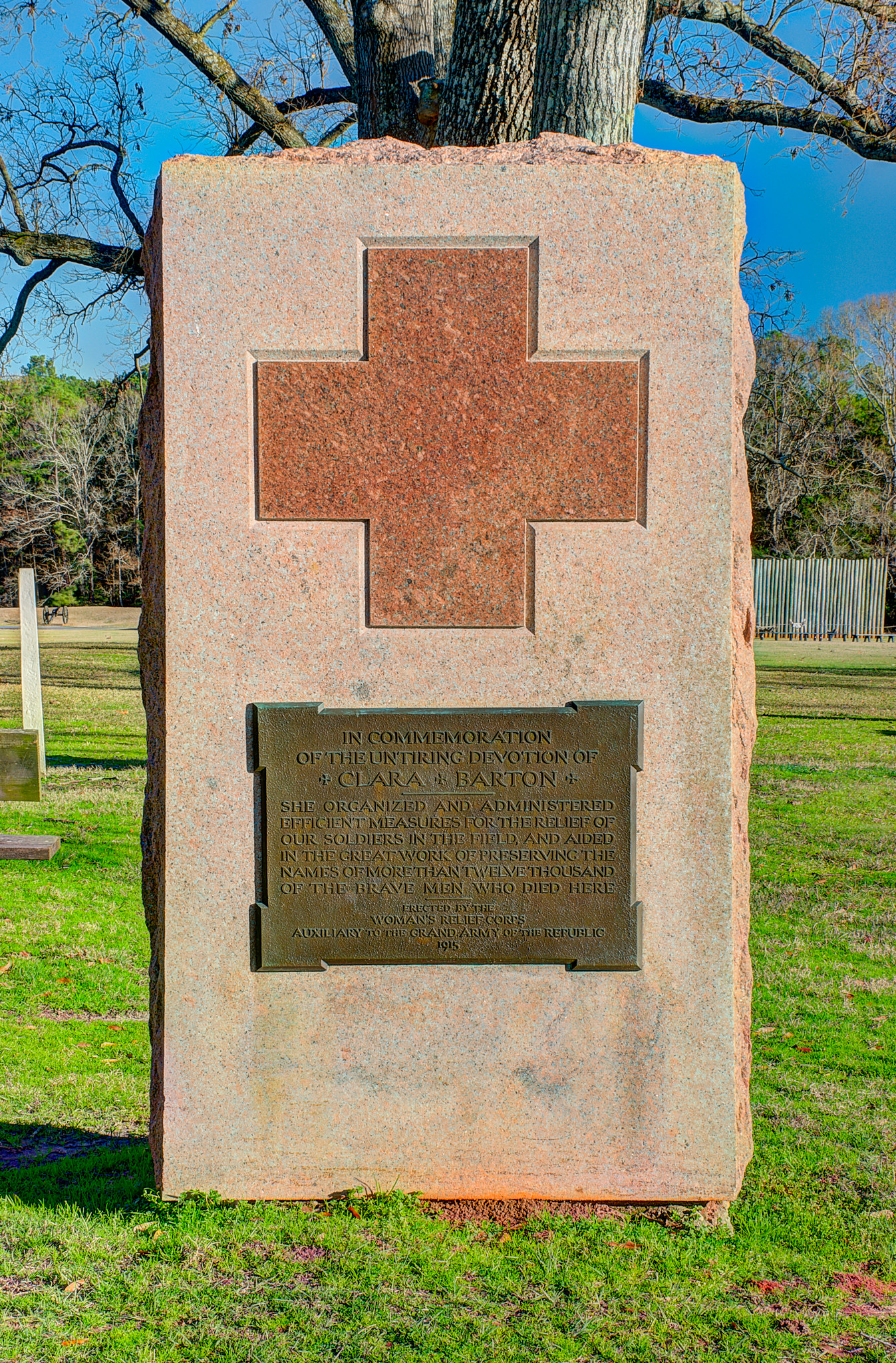
Memorial at Andersonville National Historic Site

The Clara Barton Homestead, where Barton was born in Massachusetts is open to the public as a museum.

A stamp with a portrait of Barton and an image of the American Red Cross symbol was issued in 1948

Barton was inducted into the National Women's Hall of Fame in 1973.

Barton was featured in 1995 in a set of US stamps commemorating the Civil War.

Country Joe McDonald wrote a song called Clara Barton about her work during the American Civil War and her involvement in the founding of the American Red Cross. It was released on his album Superstitious Blues with Jerry Garcia playing guitar accompaniment.

In 2019, Barton was announced as one of the members of the inaugural class of the Government Executive magazine's Government Hall of Fame.

Exhibits in the east wing of the third floor, 3 East, of the National Museum of American History are focused on the United States at war. The Clara Barton Red Cross ambulance is one of the signature artifacts within the exhibit.

The school in the Disney show Sydney to the Max is named Clara Barton Middle School.

Clara Barton was inducted into the New Jersey Hall of Fame in 2008.

== Published works ==
- Barton, Clara H. The Red Cross: In Peace and War. Washington, D.C.: American Historical Press, 1898. OCLC 1187508.
- Barton, Clara H. Story of the Red Cross: Glimpses of Field Work. New York: D. Appleton and Company, 1904. OCLC 5807882.
- Barton, Clara H. The Story of My Childhood. New York: Baker & Taylor Company, 1907. Reprinted by Arno Press in 1980. OCLC 6015444.

== See also ==
- Emily Bissell — Founder of US Red Cross Christmas Seals program
