= Cathedral of St. John (Providence, Rhode Island) =

Cathedral of Saint John
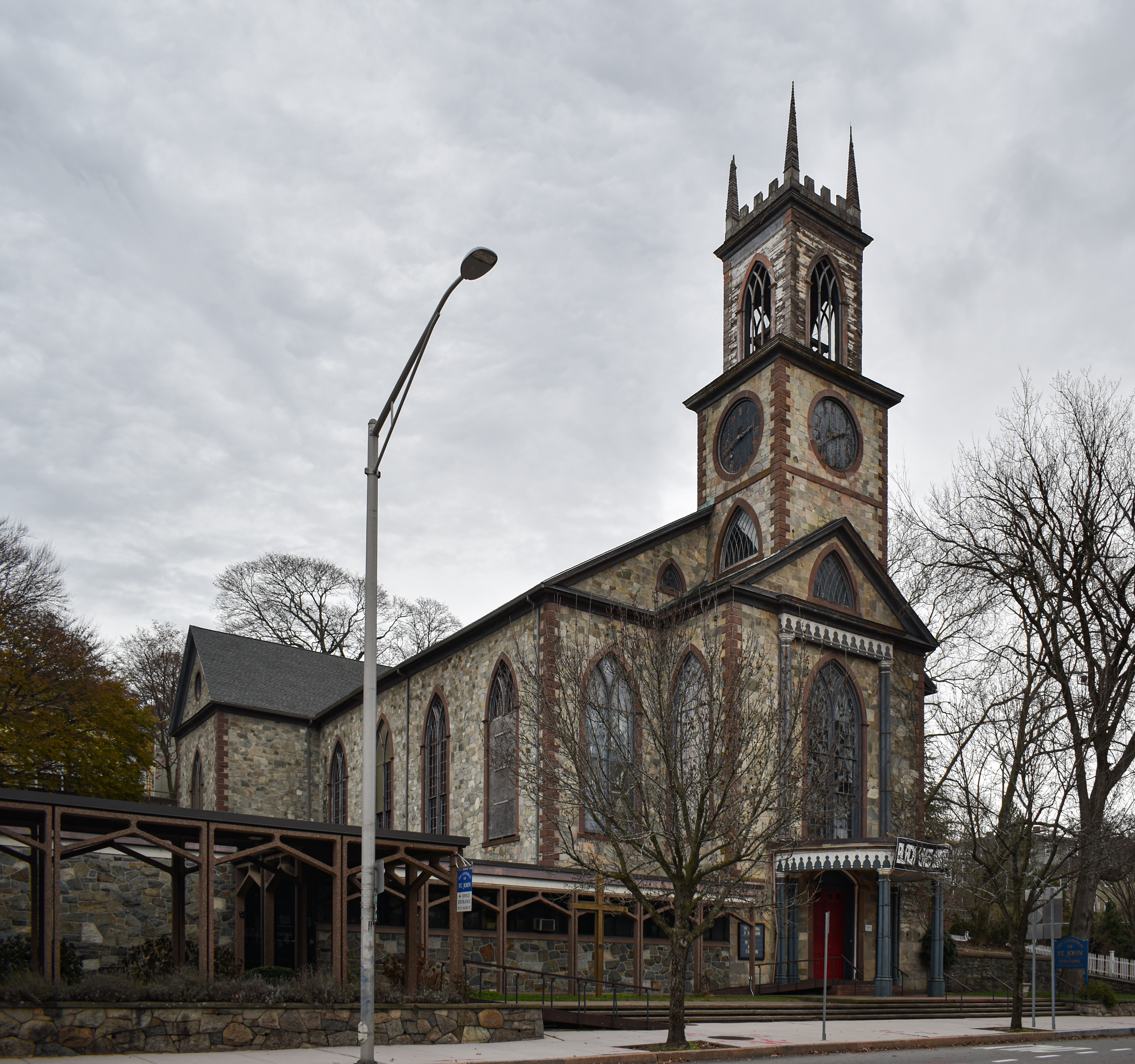

Religion
- Affiliation: Episcopal Church in the United States of America
- District: Episcopal Diocese of Rhode Island
- Status: Closed

Location
- Location: Providence, Rhode Island
- State: Rhode Island
- Interactive map of Cathedral of Saint John
- Coordinates: 41.831056°N 71.410167°W

Architecture
- Architect: John Holden Greene
- Type: Cathedral
- Style: Gothic Revival
- Founder: Gabriel Bernon
- Established: 1722
- Completed: 1810
- Materials: Stone

The Episcopal Cathedral of St. John, located at 271 North Main Street in Providence, Rhode Island was built in 1810 and was designed and built by John Holden Greene in the early Gothic Revival style, replacing a smaller wooden 1722 church on the same site. A chapel by Richard Upjohn was added in 1856, and the south transept by Clifton A. Hall in 1866. The interior was remodeled by Cram, Goodhue & Ferguson in the Baroque style in 1905, and further changes were made in 1967. The Diocesan Offices next door was designed by Milman & Sturges in 1967, and changes were made to it in 1972. The church was made a seat of the Episcopal Diocese of Rhode Island in 1929.

The church closed in 2012 due to declining membership and the need for extensive renovations. Currently, the church is being repaired and renovated to become an "exhibition and reconciliation center" focusing on the trans-Atlantic slave trade. It was partially reopened in 2018.

== History ==
=== Early history ===
The parish was originally organized in 1722 as King's Church, in honor of George I of Great Britain. The church's first building was built the same year on land donated by ship builder Nathaniel Brown. Colonel Joseph Whipple and French Huguenot Gabriel Bernon were major figures in the establishment of the church and contributed financially the cost of its construction.

The first church building was constructed of wood; this building is described as standing 62 feet long, 41 feet wide, and 26 feet high. Around 1771, a pointed steeple was built at the front of the church.

In December of 1772, an organ was installed in the church.

The church was renamed "St John's Church" in 1794.

The church's original building served Providence until 1810 when work began on what would become the Cathedral of St. John. The Episcopal Diocese of Rhode Island was formed in 1790, but it was not until 1929 that St John's Church was designated the Episcopal seat and was renamed the "Cathedral of St. John".

=== Current building ===
The cornerstone for St. John's Church was laid in 1810 and the church was dedicated in 1811. The building was designed by Federal-era architect John Holden Greene, who designed many buildings in Providence. A Cathedral corporation was formed in 1909 and in 1929, the church was designated the Episcopal seat. The building was renovated in 1855, 1866, 1906, and 1967, and retains its architectural integrity but is deteriorating. It was listed on the Providence Preservation Society 10 Most Endangered Properties List in 2007, 2008 and 2010. Citing dwindling membership and costs associated with upkeep, the diocese closed the church in 2012.

== Museum ==
In November 2014, the Episcopal Diocese of Rhode Island announced it was interested in using part of the cathedral for a museum that would examine the state's role in the trans-Atlantic slave trade, both those who profited from it and those who opposed it. The "museum and reconciliation center" is expected be the first museum in the United States to focus on the history of slavery in New England. It will also document the role of the Episcopal Church in the trans-Atlantic slave trade. It is scheduled to open in 2018.

== Gallery ==
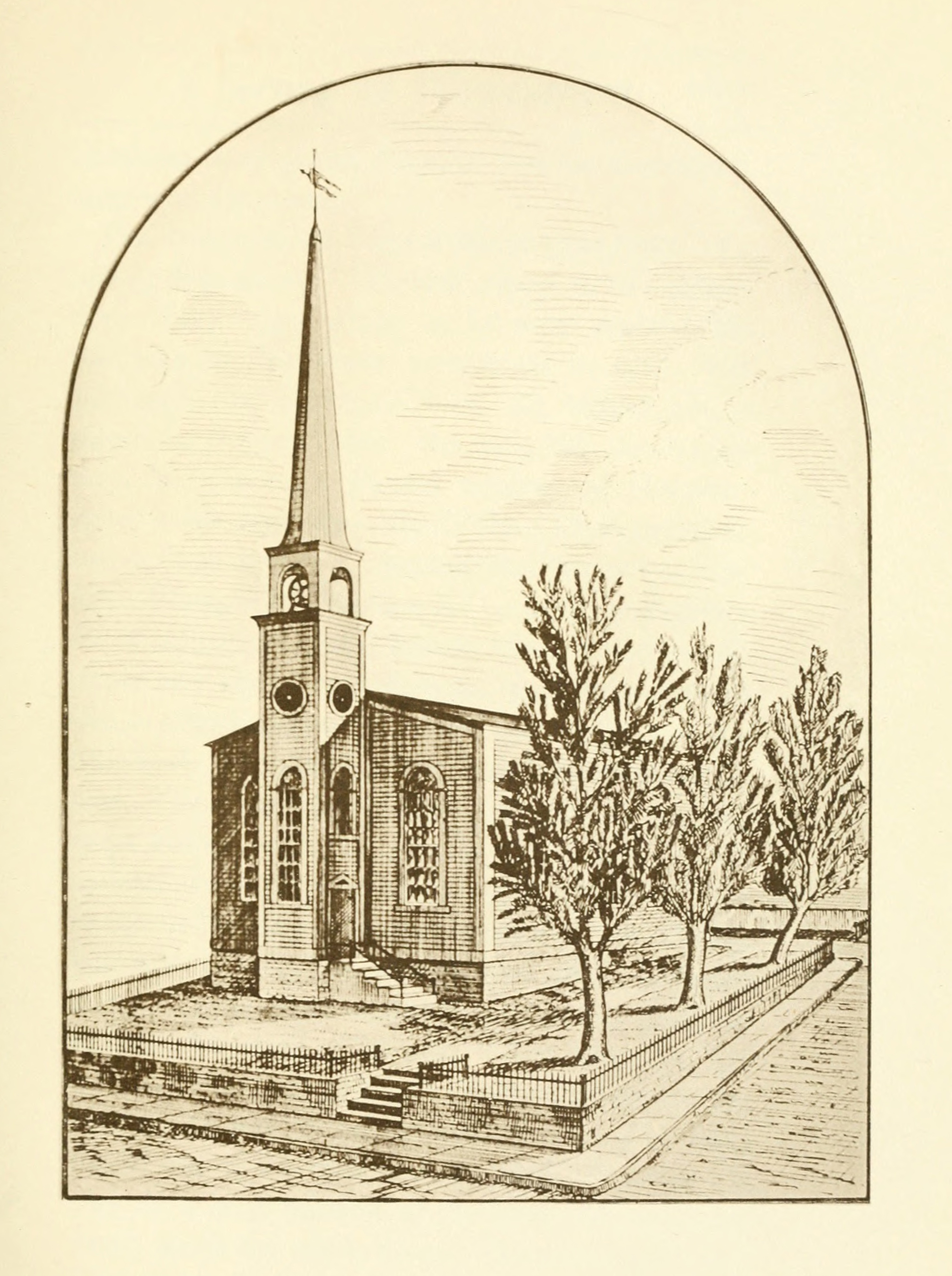
The original King's Church—a wood building constructed in 1722

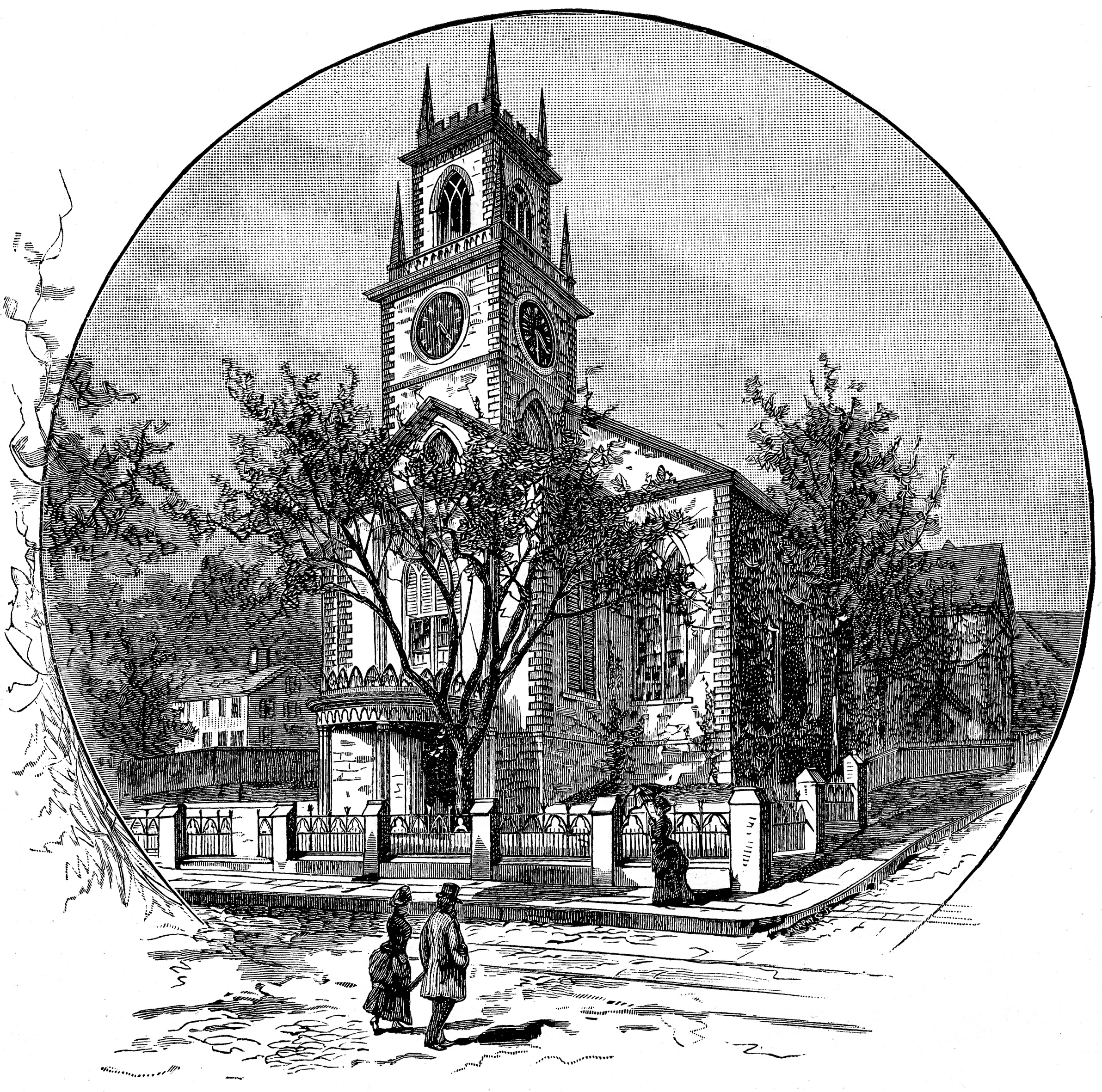
1886 engraving of the structure

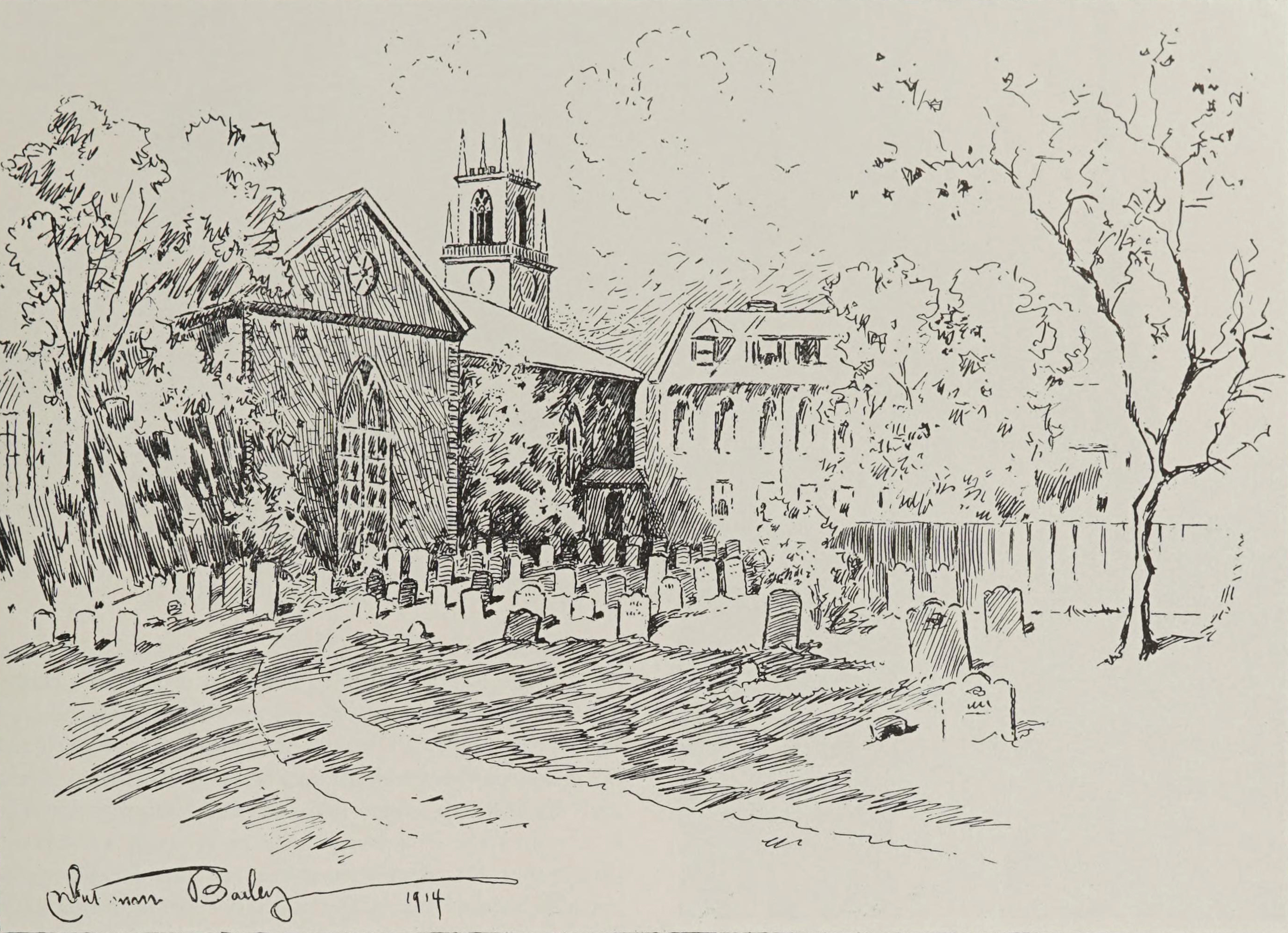
A 1914 illustration of the church from its graveyard

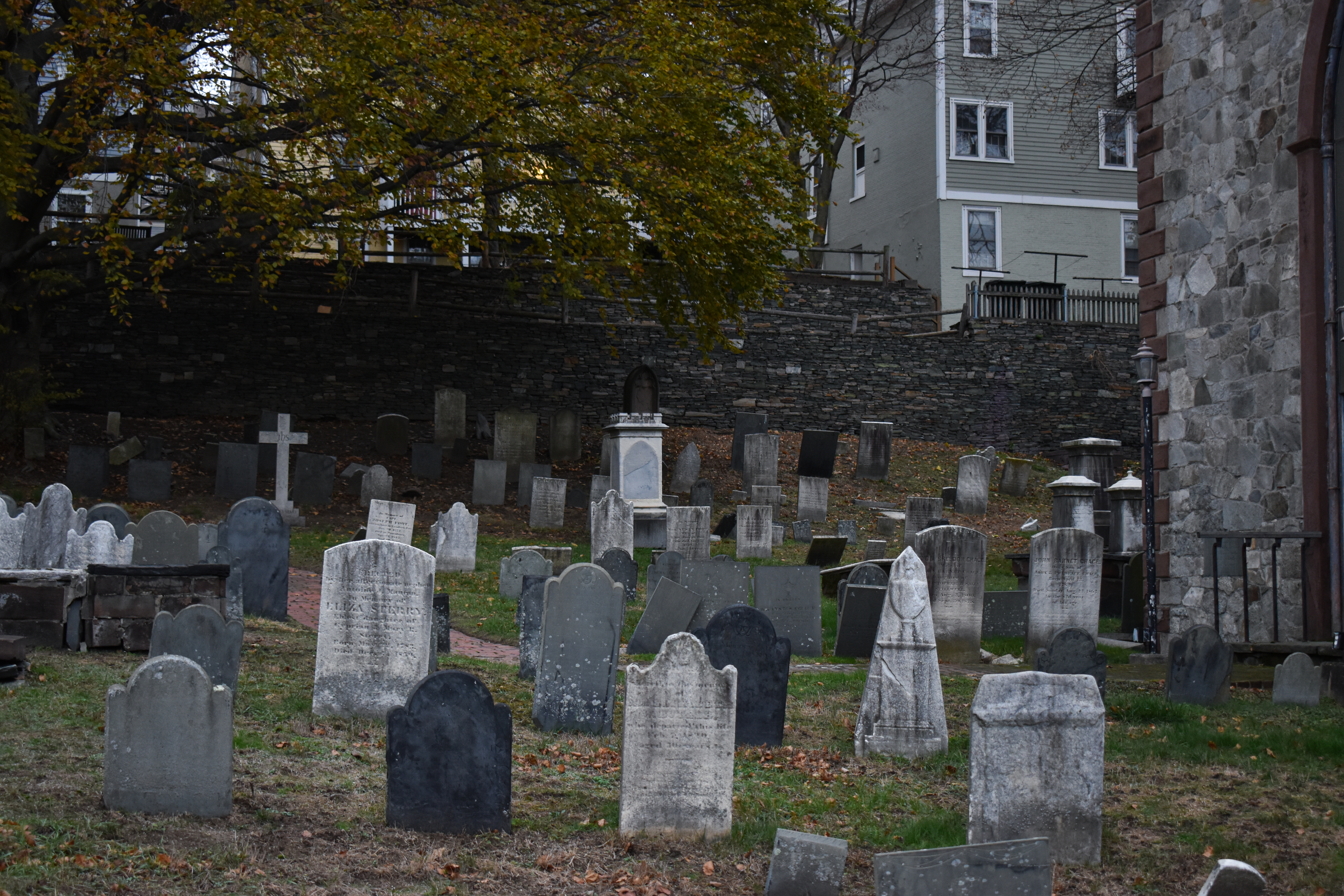
The cathedral's cemetery

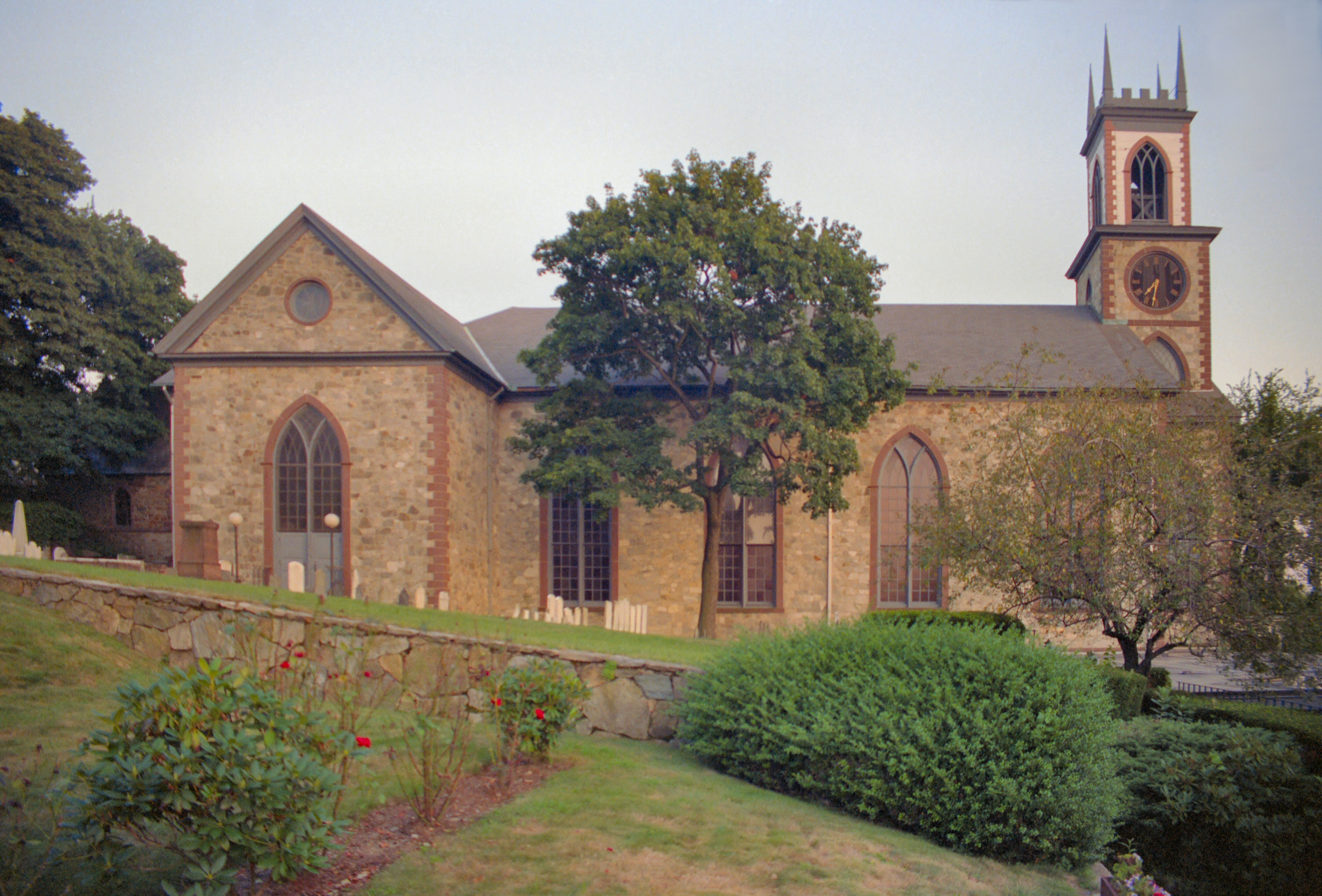
The cathedral from the north
