= Elvira Stone =

American postmaster and genealogist (1816–1900)

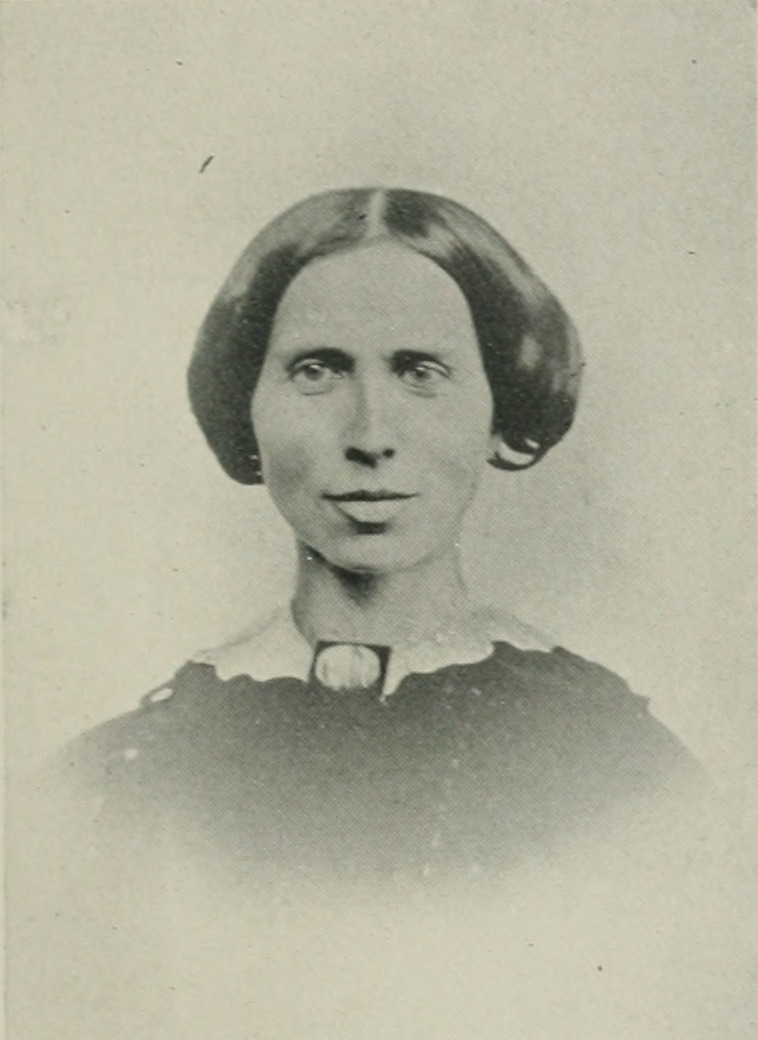
Elvira, "Vira" Stone, "A Woman of the Century" (c. 1865)

Elvira Stone (September 13, 1816 – January 9, 1900) was an American postmaster, genealogist, and teacher. She served as postmaster at North Oxford, Massachusetts from 1857 and as a member of the school board, 1870–73. Interested in genealogical researches, she traced out the descendants of Gen. Ebenezer Learned and much of that part of this work which deals with the Oxford families, was supplied by her.

== Biography ==
Martha Elvira (nickname, "Vira") Stone was born in North Oxford, Massachusetts, September 13, 1816, where she always lived. She was the only daughter of the Lieutenant Joseph Stone (d. 1862). Her mother, Martha Learned (d. 1835), was a descendant of General Ebenezer Learned who fought in the American Revolutionary War. In October 1864, Elvira's brother died, leaving a family of young children, the oldest of whom, Byron Stone, she educated.

Clara Barton was a cousin and they attended school together. Stone's early education was in the district school in her native village. She was graduated from the Oxford Classical School. Later, she took a course of study in the academy in Leicester, Massachusetts.

Stone taught in public and private schools for nineteen years, until, on petitions of the citizens, she was appointed postmaster at North Oxford, Massachusetts. The date of her commission was April 27, 1857, under the administration of Hon. Horatio King, First Assistant Postmaster-General. That position was held for more than forty years. During all that time, the office was kept in her sitting-room. In 1892, when preparations were being made for the United States Post Office Department at the Columbian Exposition in Chicago, the post office authorities at Washington, D.C. sent to Stone for her photograph, informing her she was the oldest postmistress in years of service in the U.S. Her photograph was placed on exhibition, and the same year, was published in the official post office guide.

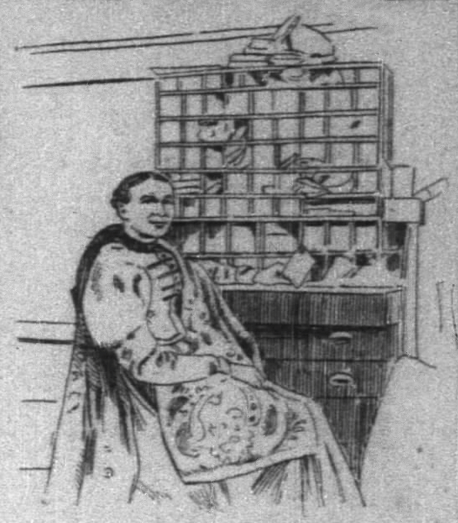
Martha Elvira Stone (1896)

By vote of the town of Oxford, Stone was elected a member of the examining school board in the spring of 1870, which office she held until 1873. Her time and talent outside of her public duties was given to literary pursuits. She was for eight years a co-laborer with Senator George L. Davis, of North Andover, Massachusetts, in his compilation of the Davis Genealogy. She was at the same time associated with Supreme Court Judge William L. Learned, of Albany, New York, in his compilation of the Learned Genealogy. The Learned and Davis families were intimately connected by frequent intermarriages. From the former, Stone traces her descent. She is the great-granddaughter of Colonel Ebenezer Learned, one of the first permanent settlers of Oxford, in 1713. During the American Civil War, she entered into it with zeal and personal aid to the extent of her ability, in all that contributed to the comfort and welfare of the soldiers. Her room was the depot for army and hospital supplies.

Stone died January 9, 1900, at her home in North Oxford, at the age of eighty-three years.
