= Disappearance of Etta Riel =

1934 American missing person case

Etta Riel
- Riel's photograph as published in The Boston Globe in February 1935
- Born: Etta H. Riel; May 4, 1914; Providence, Rhode Island, U.S.
- Disappeared: November 22, 1934; Worcester, Massachusetts, U.S.
- Status: Missing for 91 years, 11 months and 7 days
- Children: 1
- Parents: Joseph Riel (father); Rose Riel (mother)
- Family: Alma (daughter)

Etta H. Riel (May 4, 1914 – disappeared November 22, 1934) was an American woman who disappeared from Worcester, Massachusetts, in 1934. Her missing person case remains unsolved.

== Case ==
=== Disappearance ===
In early 1934, Etta Riel was living with her family in Oxford, Massachusetts, and attending nearby Worcester State Teachers College. In May, she filed a paternity suit against a local man, Henry Sawin, whom she named as the father of her unborn baby. She and Sawin had dated in high school and had stayed in touch after Sawin moved to Maine to attend Bates College. In September, Riel gave birth to a baby girl.

On the evening of November 21, Riel and Sawin met at the home of a mutual friend before driving together to Riel's family home where an Oxford police officer observed them parked around midnight. Shortly after midnight, Riel informed her sister that she and Sawin had decided to marry and were traveling to New York City that night. She packed a small travel bag and said she would return later in the week to retrieve her baby. She left in Sawin's car.

On November 22, the day of the scheduled paternity hearing, Riel's sister encountered Sawin, who denied making any marriage or travel plans with Riel and stated that he dropped her off at Worcester's Union Station hours before. When questioned by police, he stated that Riel had admitted to falsely accusing him of paternity and had expressed apprehension about the day's court proceedings. He said he was unaware of where she intended to travel that night and that she may have been suicidal. Sawin's claims seemed supported by letters Riel wrote to friends in October in which she expressed a desire to commit suicide.

On December 2, Riel's attorney received a telegram ostensibly signed by Riel directing him to withdraw the paternity case against Sawin. Police later discovered the telegram was ordered from a pay telephone in New York City by a caller who provided a false address. The identity of the sender was never determined. In 1935, several witnesses claimed they had seen or spoken to Riel in the weeks and months following her disappearance, but police were unable to confirm any sightings of Riel subsequent to November 22.

=== Investigation ===
Between 2 a.m. and 4 a.m. on the day of Riel's disappearance, the Worcester train dispatcher and station master received three telephone calls to the station's unlisted number. The callers, one of whom claimed to be the Oxford switchboard operator, requested that Riel be located and prevented from boarding the train though searches of the station failed to locate her. Police later determined that no such calls were placed from the Oxford telephone exchange and the callers were never identified.

Although Riel went missing in late November, the first newspaper reports of her disappearance were published on February 7, 1935.

While Sawin remained a person of interest throughout the investigation, police also questioned several other people whom they believed were connected to Riel's disappearance. Early in 1935, police investigated a Putnam, Connecticut, man who claimed to have corresponded with Riel and had traveled to Florida with an unidentified companion around the time of her disappearance, but they later ruled out any further connection with the case. In August, police questioned a woman who claimed to have shared an apartment with Riel in Boston, but that witness was later committed to a psychiatric hospital.

The Massachusetts State Police conducted extensive searches for Riel's body for years after her disappearance. In the belief that Riel may have been clandestinely buried in an Oxford cemetery, police exhumed several graves in 1935 and 1937. In April 1935, investigators carried out a ground search in locations across Worcester County, including numerous ponds and areas in the nearby Purgatory Chasm. Also in 1935, police interviewed a local mystic who claimed that Riel was being held captive in the area by an unknown woman. Three years after her disappearance, a detective assigned to the case stated that he believed Riel was alive.

== Publicity ==
Riel's case received wide publicity in the eastern United States in the 1930s and was covered by national wire services. In March 1937, "The Disappearance of Etta Riel" was the subject of New York's WOR radio Mystery Stories program. In May of that year, Liberty magazine published a feature-length article on the case. A 1948 article about the disappearance of Paula Jean Welden from Bennington College cited the Riel case, along with the 1925 disappearance of Alice Corbett from Smith College, as examples of other mysterious disappearances of New England college women.

== Lawsuit ==
In 1990, Riel's daughter, Alma Conlon, filed a paternity suit against Sawin, reviving the police investigation into her mother's disappearance after nearly 60 years. Conlon asked a probate judge to declare Sawin as her legal father, but her case was thrown out in 1993. Sawin died in May 1998.

== See also ==
- List of people who disappeared mysteriously: 1910–1990
