= Hudson House (Oxford, Massachusetts) =

Historic house in Massachusetts, United States

- U.S. National Register of Historic Places
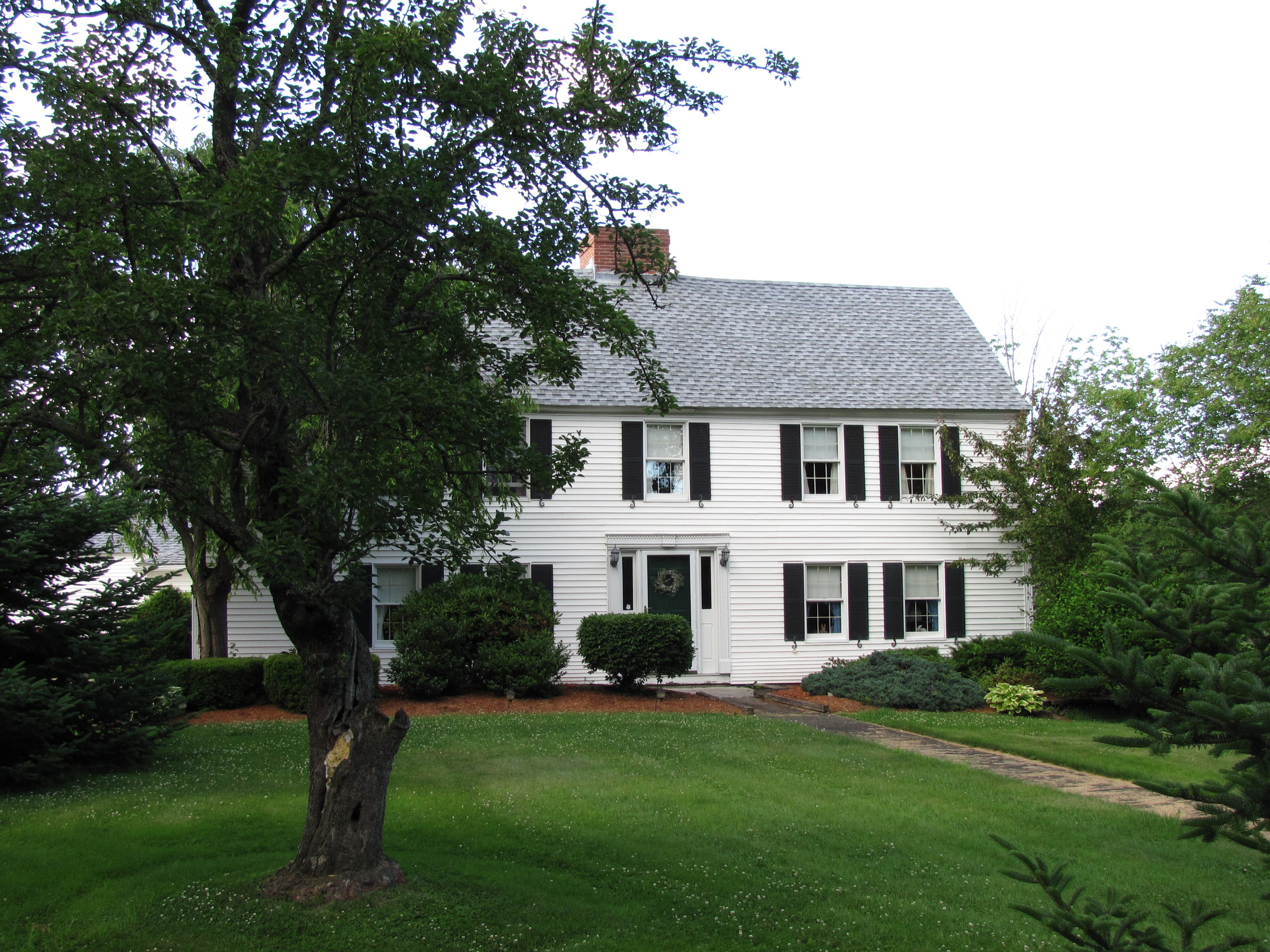
- Hudson House

- Location within Massachusetts Location within the United States
- Nearest city: Oxford, Massachusetts
- Coordinates: 42°8′32″N 71°50′12″W
- Built: 1720
- NRHP reference No.: 78000480
- Added to NRHP: February 8, 1978

The Hudson House is a historic First Period house in Oxford, Massachusetts. It is a 2 1/2-story timber-frame house, five bays wide, with a side gable roof, central chimney, and clapboard siding. The main facade is symmetrical. with a modern central entrance in the Georgian Revival style, with sidelights and pilasters at the sides, and an entablature above. The house has a section that was probably built c. 1720 by William Hudson, one of the first English settlers of Oxford. It was probably extended from three bays to five later in the 18th century. It remained in Hudson family hands until about 1960. It is believed to be Oxford's oldest standing building.

The house was listed on the National Register of Historic Places in 1978.

== See also ==
- National Register of Historic Places listings in Worcester County, Massachusetts
