= Tom Herrion =

American basketball coach

Biographical details
- Born: November 13, 1967 (age 58); Oxford, Massachusetts, U.S.

Playing career
- 1985–1986: Merrimack

Coaching career (HC unless noted)
- 1986–1987: Merrimack (asst.)
- 1987–1989: Cambridge RLS (asst.)
- 1989–1994: Merrimack (asst.)
- 1994–1998: Providence (asst.)
- 1998–2002: Virginia (asst.)
- 2002–2006: College of Charleston
- 2007–2010: Pittsburgh (asst./assoc. HC)
- 2010–2014: Marshall
- 2014–2016: Georgia Tech (asst.)
- 2016–2017: TCU (asst.)
- 2017–2021: South Florida (asst.)

Head coaching record
- Overall: 147–105 (.583)

Accomplishments and honors

Championships
- SoCon regular season (2003)

Tom Herrion (born November 13, 1967) is an American college basketball assistant coach for South Florida. He also previously served as head basketball coach at Marshall University and at the College of Charleston.

== Personal life ==
Born in Oxford, Massachusetts, Herrion was a three-year letterwinner in both basketball and baseball at Oxford High School. He graduated in 1985.

Herrion received his bachelor's degree in psychology from Merrimack College in 1989. As an undergrad at Merrimack, he competed in both basketball and baseball and worked as a student assistant coach in 1986–87. He also served two seasons as the junior varsity coach at Cambridge Ridge and Latin High School in Cambridge, Massachusetts.

Herrion hails from a coaching family. His father, the late Jim Herrion, was a successful high school coach in the New York City Catholic League before becoming an assistant coach at Holy Cross and later the head coach at Worcester Polytechnic Institute. His older brother Bill Herrion is currently the head basketball coach at the University of New Hampshire (2005–present). Bill has also served head coaching stints at both East Carolina (1999–2005) and Drexel University (1991–99).

== Coaching career ==
Herrion's collegiate coaching experience includes assistant stints at the University of Virginia (1999–2002), Providence College (1994–98) and NCAA Division II Merrimack College (1989–94). He spent eight seasons under Pete Gillen at both Virginia and Providence. In his four seasons at Virginia, Herrion helped Gillen orchestrate a 70–50 (58%) record and three postseason appearances. His main responsibilities included recruitment of student-athletes, scheduling and scouting of opponents and assisting with practice planning and game preparation. Additionally, the Cavaliers' recruiting classes were ranked among the nation's top-10 in three of his four seasons with the program. At Providence under Gillen, the Friars put together a 72–53 (58%) four-year record including a berth in the NCAA Tournament's Elite Eight and two NIT appearances.

Herrion also served as an assistant coach at his alma mater, Merrimack College, from 1989 to 1994. During that time, he helped guide Merrimack to two NCAA Division II tournament appearances.

=== College of Charleston ===
As a head coach, Herrion spent four seasons at the College of Charleston. From 2002 to 2006, he compiled an 80–38 (68%) four-year record, earned a national top-25 ranking, guided his team to the 2003 National Invitation Tournament and achieved the best winning percentage in the Southern Conference during that period. His first Cougar team in 2002–03 finished 25–8, captured the Great Alaska Shootout title and advanced to the NIT. His 25 victories marked the highest total of any first-year NCAA Division I head coach during the 2002–03 season. Herrion also guided the Cougars to a 20–9 finish in 2003–04, an 18–10 performance in 2004–05, and a 17–11 record in 2005–06.

=== University of Pittsburgh ===
In the spring of 2007, Herrion arrived at the University of Pittsburgh as an assistant to head coach Jamie Dixon. He was later promoted to the position of associate head coach at Pittsburgh, where his main responsibilities included recruiting student-athletes, game preparation and on-floor coaching. Herrion assisted head coach Dixon in leading Pitt to the NCAA tournament during his three-year stint at the school that included a run to the "Elite Eight" in 2009, a year that saw the Panthers earn their first-ever #1 rankings in the AP Poll and Coaches' Poll, their first-ever victories over a #1 ranked team (UConn, twice), and their first-ever #1 seed in the NCAA Tournament (East Region). During the 2007–08 season, Pitt also won the Big East tournament. In the 2009–10 season, Herrion's final year as an assistant at Pitt, they lost to Notre Dame in their first Big East tournament game, and concluded the season in the NCAA Tournament with a second-round loss to Xavier.

=== Marshall University ===
Herrion was announced on April 10, 2010 as the 28th head coach of men's basketball at Marshall University.

In 2012, Herrion coached the Thundering Herd to the National Invitational Tournament for the first time since 1988.

On March 14, 2014, Marshall announced it had bought out the remaining two years of Herrion's contract. Herrion went 67–67 in four seasons, but just 24–41 in his final two years. Marshall Athletic Director Mike Hamrick said "We just didn't win enough games." Herrion's buyout was around $550,000.

=== Georgia Tech ===
On September 18, 2014, Herrion was hired by Georgia Tech head coach Brian Gregory as an assistant coach.

=== TCU ===
On July 21, 2016, Herrion was hired by TCU head coach Jamie Dixon as a special assistant.

=== South Florida ===
On April 5, 2017, Herrion was once again hired by Gregory as an assistant coach, this time for South Florida.

== Broadcasting career ==
Herrion spent the 2006–07 year working as a television commentator for both ESPN Regional and Comcast, providing analysis for Conference USA games. He also worked as a collegiate player development consultant at the Nike All-American Camp and Michael Jordan Flight School before becoming the assistant head coach at Pittsburgh.

== Head coaching record ==
Record table
Season	Team	Overall	Conference	Standing	Postseason
College of Charleston Cougars (Southern Conference) (2002–2006)
2002–03	Charleston	25–8	13–3	1st (south)	NIT Second Round
2003–04	Charleston	20–9	11–5	T–1st (south)	
2004–05	Charleston	18–10	10–6	2nd (south)	
2005–06	Charleston	17–11	9–6	3rd (south)	
College of Charleston:		80–38 (.678)	43–20 (.683)		
Marshall Thundering Herd (Conference USA) (2010–2014)
2010–11	Marshall	22–12	9–7	6th	CIT First Round
2011–12	Marshall	21–14	9–7	6th	NIT First Round
2012–13	Marshall	13–19	6–10	9th	
2013–14	Marshall	11–22	4–12	15th	
Marshall:		67–67 (.500)	28–36 (.438)		
Total:		147–105 (.583)			
National champion Postseason invitational champion Conference regular season champion Conference regular season and conference tournament champion Division regular season champion Division regular season and conference tournament champion Conference tournament champion
