= Huguenot Fort =

Historic fortification in Oxford, Massachusetts, US

- U.S. National Register of Historic Places
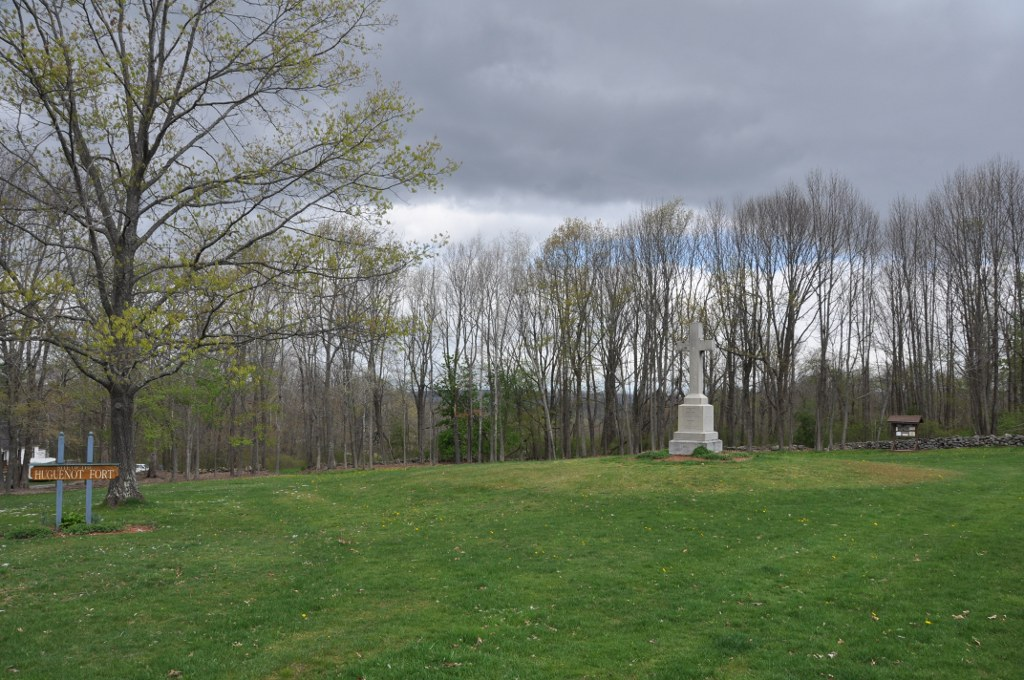

- Location within Massachusetts Location within the United States
- Location: Oxford, Massachusetts
- Coordinates: 42°5′55″N 71°50′50″W
- Built: 1694
- NRHP reference No.: 88000424
- Added to NRHP: April 27, 1988

The Huguenot Fort is a historic fortification site on Fort Hill Road in Oxford, Massachusetts.

== History ==
The original fort was built in 1694 by Huguenots, Protestant immigrants who were fleeing state church persecution in France. Oxford was originally settled by Huguenots in two waves, the original settlement having been abandoned after four residents (John Johnson and his three children, Peter, Andrew and Mary) were killed in a violent confrontation with local Native Americans. This event, the Johnson Massacre, is commemorated near the center of town. The remains of the Huguenots' Fort (built in 1686–1694) to protect from Indian attack still exist off of Huguenot Road commemorated by a nineteenth-century monument. The site was added to the National Register of Historic Places in 1988.

== In Literature ==
This is the subject of Lydia Sigourney's poem Huguenot Fort, published in her Scenes in my Native Land, 1845.

== See also ==
- National Register of Historic Places listings in Worcester County, Massachusetts
