= Barton Center for Diabetes Education =

Coordinates: 42.154361°N 71.894612°W

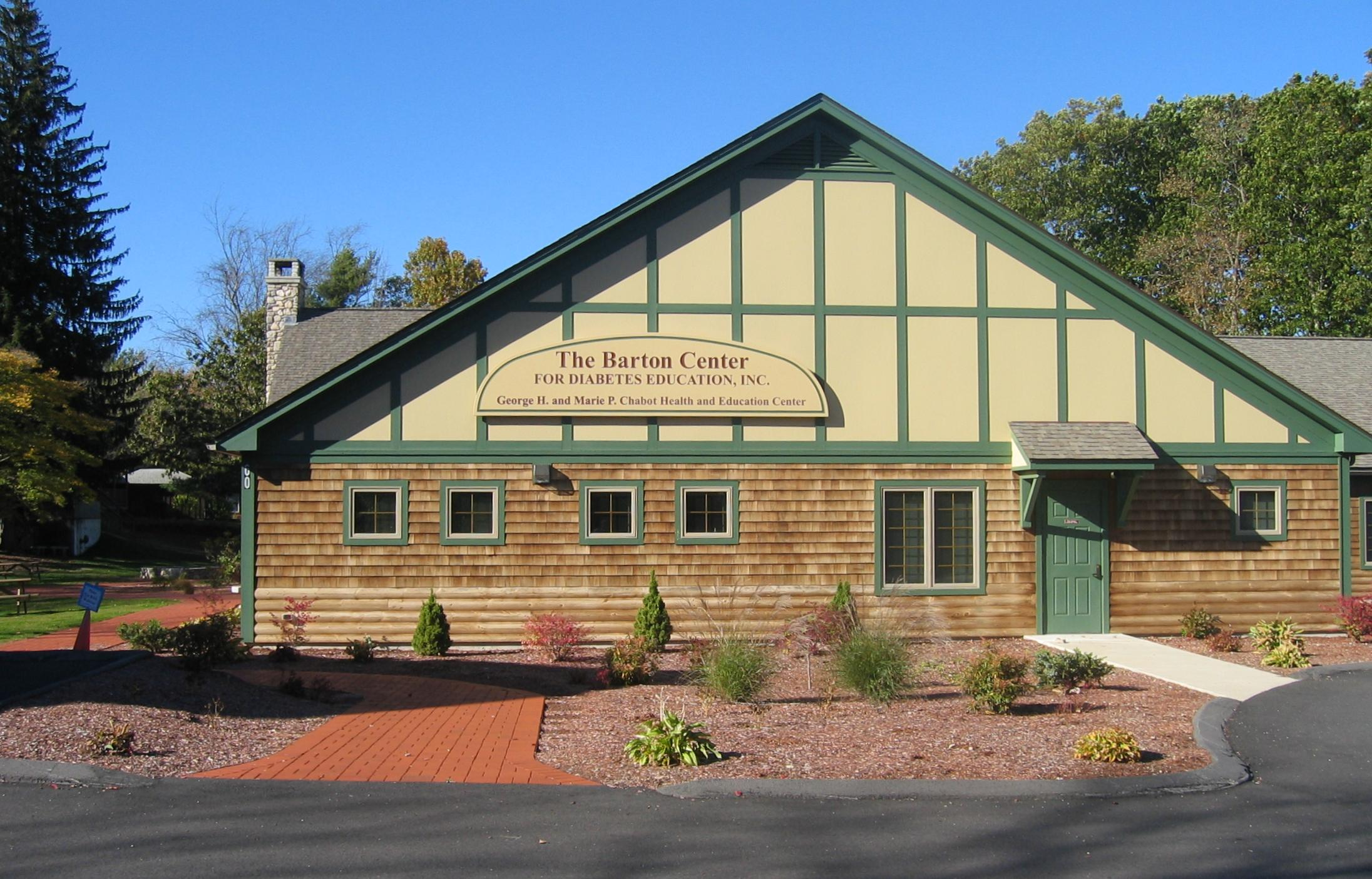
The Barton Center for Diabetes Education

The Barton Center for Diabetes Education is an independent, non-profit 501(c)(3) organization, located in North Oxford, Massachusetts, dedicated to the education of children living with diabetes and their families and caregivers through year-round programs. The mission is to improve the lives of children with insulin-dependent diabetes through education, recreation, and support programs which inspire and empower.

== History ==
In 1921, the Women's National Missionary Association of the Universalist Church purchased the home of Clara Barton, founder of the American Red Cross, on what would have been her 100th anniversary. The property included a farmhouse, a barn, and 96 acres (390,000 m^{2}) of land. The home was restored as a museum, and in 1925, a "fresh air camp" for inner-city youths was opened. This humanitarian endeavor was designed to honor Clara Barton, herself a Universalist.

Concurrently, in 1921, insulin was discovered in Canada by Frederick Banting and Charles Best. While the Universalist Women were building the "camp", Dr. Elliott P. Joslin became one of the first physicians to use insulin to save the lives of children with diabetes. Children from across the country came to Boston to be treated by Dr. Joslin. Care for children with diabetes became his passion.

In 1932, Dr. Joslin and the Universalist women joined forces to create The Clara Barton Birthplace Camp, an "island of safety" for children with diabetes. The women provided property and funding, while Dr. Joslin became the first medical director of the camp, serving eight girls during the first year. The Clara Barton Birthplace Camp was revered around the world as the first "hospital in the woods" and many smaller programs were modeled after it.

In 1948, the enormous success of the "camp experiment" at the Barton homestead inspired Dr. Joslin to ask the Universalist Women to open another camp for boys on property purchased by Dr. Joslin in Charlton, MA. The Universalist Women agreed to administer both programs while Dr. Joslin and his staff provided the medical coverage. The "Barton" camp for girls and "Joslin" camp for boys became among the largest and most recognized programs of their kind in the world.

Ultimately, the financial burden of operating the boys and girls camps became too difficult, and the women’s organization began divesting itself of the responsibility of the boys' camp, relinquishing control to the Joslin Diabetes Center of Boston in 1976.

In early 2008, in a move that brought the girls' and boys' camps back together after 31 years apart, The Barton Center entered into an agreement with Joslin Diabetes Center to assume the management and operation of Camp Joslin. While Joslin Diabetes Center retained ownership of Camp Joslin, The Barton Center was thrilled to combine Camp Joslin's services to its already thriving programs, thereby expanding the opportunities for girls and boys alike.

The North Oxford site was dedicated in 1932 to educating children with diabetes and has been in continuous operation ever since. The Barton Center for Diabetes Education, Inc. has grown as an independent organization, from serving eight girls in 1932 to serving 2,000 children and their families today.

== Summer programs ==
=== Residential camp ===
Clara Barton Camp, a residential summer camp for girls ages 6–16, located in North Oxford, MA.

Camp Joslin, a residential summer camp for boys ages 6–16, located in Charlton, MA. The Camp Joslin program is operated by The Barton Center.

=== Day camp ===
Day camp programs for boys and girls, ages 6–12, are offered in Greenwich, CT; Worcester, MA; Long Island, NY; Boston, MA; and New York, NY.

=== Family camp ===
Residential summer camp in North Oxford, MA for entire families (parents and siblings) with at least one child, ages 6–16, who has insulin-dependent diabetes.

=== Adventure/Wilderness Leadership programs ===
Nature-oriented outdoor camping program for children with diabetes, including coed adventure programs for children ages 13–17, and coed Wilderness Leadership programs for children ages 15–18.

== Fall, winter, and spring programs ==
Family Programs are offered for the entire family.

Weekend Programs are offered for children with insulin-dependent diabetes.

WACkY Sessions are offered twice a year, and allow campers to bring a sibling or a friend who does not have diabetes with them to camp during these sessions.

== Rentals ==
The Barton Center features woodlands and fields, ponds for swimming and boating, and log cabins. The North Oxford, MA site features a new health and education center, and the Charlton, MA site features a large new dining hall. The facilities are available for rental to outside groups in the fall, winter, and spring.

== Staff ==
The Barton Center camp staff is made up of endocrinologists, mental health professionals, nurse educators, dieticians, and trained counselors, many of whom also have diabetes.
