= Oxford, Massachusetts =

- Town
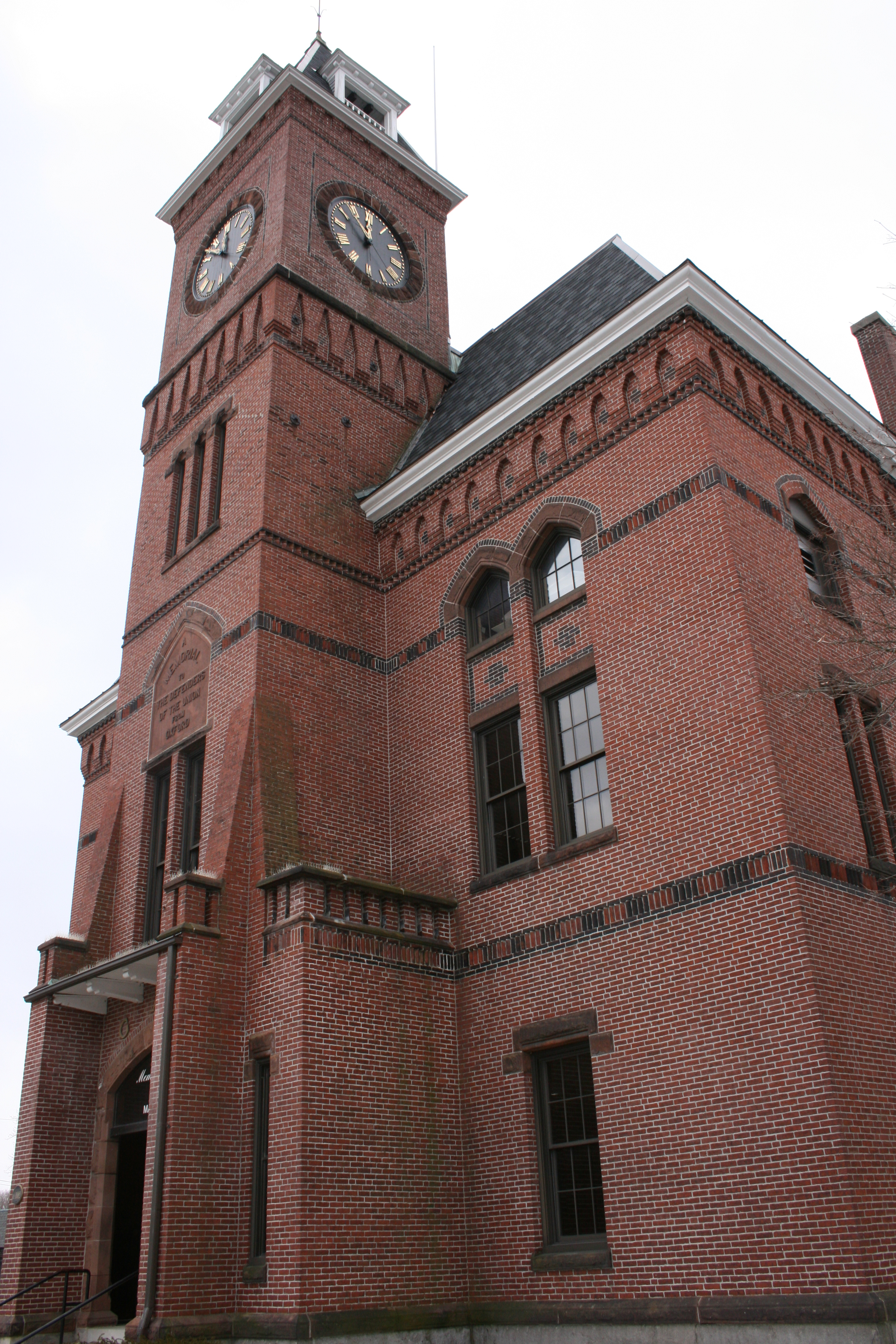
- Oxford Town Hall

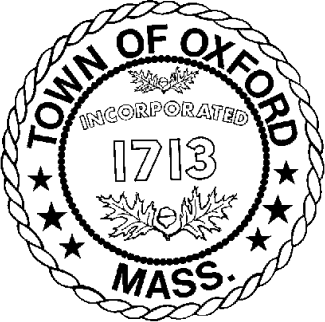
- Seal

- Location in Worcester County and the state of Massachusetts.
- Coordinates: 42°07′43″N 71°51′59″W
- Country: United States
- State: Massachusetts
- County: Worcester
- Settled: 1687
- Incorporated: 1713

Government
  - Type: Open town meeting
  - Town Manager: Jennifer Callahan

Area
  - Total: 27.5 sq mi (71.3 km^{2})
  - Land: 26.6 sq mi (69.0 km^{2})
  - Water: 0.89 sq mi (2.3 km^{2})
- Elevation: 509 ft (155 m)

Population (2020)
  - Total: 13,347
  - Density: 501/sq mi (193/km^{2})
- Time zone: UTC−5 (Eastern)
  - Summer (DST): UTC−4 (Eastern)
- ZIP Codes: 01537 (North Oxford); 01540 (Oxford); 01542 (Rochdale)
- Area code: 508/ 774
- FIPS code: 25-51825
- GNIS feature ID: 618379
- Website: www.oxfordma.us

Oxford is a town in Worcester County, Massachusetts, United States. The population was 13,347 as of the 2020 United States census. The town contains the census-designated place of the same name. It was the birthplace of Clara Barton, the first president and founder of the American Red Cross.

== History ==
=== Pre-Colonial Era ===
Present day Oxford and the areas surrounding it were inhabited for thousands of years before European colonization. Although archaeological sites exist in Central Massachusetts dating back to the Paleoindian period (12,000–9000 years before present) there are much more abundant archaeological remains starting in the period from 6500 to 3000 years before present, including an arrowhead identified in Oxford Massachusetts. An arrowhead collected at an archaeological site in Oxford has been radiocarbon dated to 2990 ± 155 years before present.

=== Contact Era ===
At the time of English colonization in the early and mid-1600s, the area was inhabited by the Pegan subgroup of the Nipmuc people, whom the English attempted to convert to Christianity. To this end, out of unceded Nipmuc lands, the Society for the Propagation of the Gospel in New England created the praying town of Manchaug in the early 1670s, which included present day Oxford in its bounds. In 1674 around 60 native people lived in Manchaug, however residents fled the town during King Phillip's War when praying towns were targeted by both colonial and Wampanoag war parties: for example, despite their neutrality in the conflict, in 1676 the neighboring Nipmuc praying town of Chaubunagungamaug was attacked by the colonial militia and 52 people were killed or captured.

After King Philip's War, neighboring Chaubunagungamaug was the only inhabited Nipmuc praying town, and in 1681-1682 the constable of Chaubunagungamaug, known as Black James, acting on behalf of the Nipmuc Praying Indians (though not their non-Christianized counterparts), signed a deed selling large tracts of land in the Chaubunagungamaug and Manchaug to investors including Joseph Dudley in Roxbury and Robert Thompson in London. This sale included the present day town of Oxford.

=== Colonial Era ===
Oxford was first colonized intermittently by Europeans in 1687, with several breaks during the French and Indian Wars, and was officially incorporated in 1713. In 1687, Robert Thompson arranged for a group of 52 French Huguenots he had connected with in London to colonize the land recently purchased from Black James. During this early period the Huguenot settlement grew to about 70 individuals, while Native settlements remained in the area numbering around 40 families.

In 1694, the Huguenot colonists built the Huguenot Fort out of concern for conflict with local Native Americans after the outbreak of hostilities between the Massachusetts colony and the Wabanaki Confederacy in King William's War. The original settlement was abandoned after four residents (John Johnson and his three children, Peter, Andrew and Mary) were killed in a violent confrontation with local Native Americans. This event, the "Johnson Massacre," is commemorated near the south end of town on Main Street. The remains of the Huguenot Fort still exist near Huguenot Road.

The English investors who received the deed from Black James in 1682 continued to try to recruit settlers to the Oxford area, and by 1720, a group of around 30 English families had founded a new church there with a new minister. From 1699 to 1704, Huguenot settlers attempted to return to the settlement but it was abandoned again during Queen Anne's War. The first town clerk of Oxford was John Town, who also served as selectman and as a church deacon.

== Geography ==
According to the United States Census Bureau, the town has a total area of 27.5 square miles (71 km^{2}), of which 26.6 square miles (69 km^{2}) is land and 0.9 square miles (2.3 km^{2}), or 3.20%, is water. The town sits in a valley, and much of its area lies in the flood plain of the French River, which runs through the town. A substantial parcel north and west of Oxford Center is held, for flood control purposes, by the U.S. Army Corps of Engineers. The land, known as Greenbriar, also serves as a nature preserve.

It also serves to cut off east–west travel on former roads through the site. Route 20 runs east–west through North Oxford, running north–south Route 12, locally called Main Street; less than a mile from Route 56, connecting North Oxford with points north; and Interstate 395, linking Oxford to Worcester and eastern Connecticut with three local exits: Depot Road in North Oxford; Sutton Avenue, the main east–west street in Oxford Center; and Cudworth Road, near the Webster town line.

The town used to include much of what is now Webster, on its southern border, but Oxford and neighboring Dudley both gave portions of their land to allow the creation of that town. Other towns bordering Oxford are Charlton to the west, Leicester and Auburn to the north, Millbury and Sutton to the east, and Douglas to the southeast.

== Demographics ==
Historical population
Year	Pop.	±%
1790	1,000	—
1800	1,273	+27.3%
1810	1,277	+0.3%
1820	1,562	+22.3%
1830	2,034	+30.2%
1840	1,742	−14.4%
1850	2,380	+36.6%
1860	3,034	+27.5%
1870	2,713	−10.6%
1880	2,604	−4.0%
1890	2,616	+0.5%
1900	2,677	+2.3%
1910	3,361	+25.6%
1920	3,820	+13.7%
1930	3,943	+3.2%
1940	4,623	+17.2%
1950	5,851	+26.6%
1960	9,282	+58.6%
1970	10,345	+11.5%
1980	11,680	+12.9%
1990	12,588	+7.8%
2000	13,352	+6.1%
2010	13,709	+2.7%
2020	13,347	−2.6%
2022*	13,287	−0.4%
* = population estimate Source: United States census records and Population Estimates Program data.

As of the 2000 census there were 13,352 people, 5,058 households, and 3,596 families residing in the town. The population density was 501.5 inhabitants per square mile (193.6/km^{2}). There were 5,228 housing units at an average density of 196.4 per square mile (75.8/km^{2}). The racial makeup of the town was 96.62% White, 0.87% Black or African American, 0.25% Native American, 0.84% Asian, 0.02% Pacific Islander, 0.32% from other races, and 1.07% from two or more races. Of the population, 1.97% were Hispanic or Latino of any race.

There were 5,058 households, out of which 34.6% had children under the age of 18 living with them, 56.0% were married couples living together, 11.6% had a female householder with no husband present, and 28.9% were non-families. Of all households, 23.6% were made up of individuals, and 8.6% had someone living alone who was 65 years of age or older. The average household size was 2.62 and the average family size was 3.12.

In the town, the population was spread out, with 26.1% under the age of 18, 7.5% from 18 to 24, 32.4% from 25 to 44, 22.8% from 45 to 64, and 11.2% who were 65 years of age or older. The median age was 37 years. For every 100 females, there were 93.5 males. For every 100 females age 18 and over, there were 89.6 males.

The median income for a household in the town was $52,233, and the median income for a family was $58,973. Males had a median income of $41,727 versus $30,828 for females. The per capita income for the town was $21,828. Of the population, 7.8% and 5.5% of families were below the poverty line. Of those, 12.5% under the age of 18 and 7.6% of those 65 and older were living below the poverty line.

=== Oxford (CDP) ===
Oxford Census Designated Place
- CDP
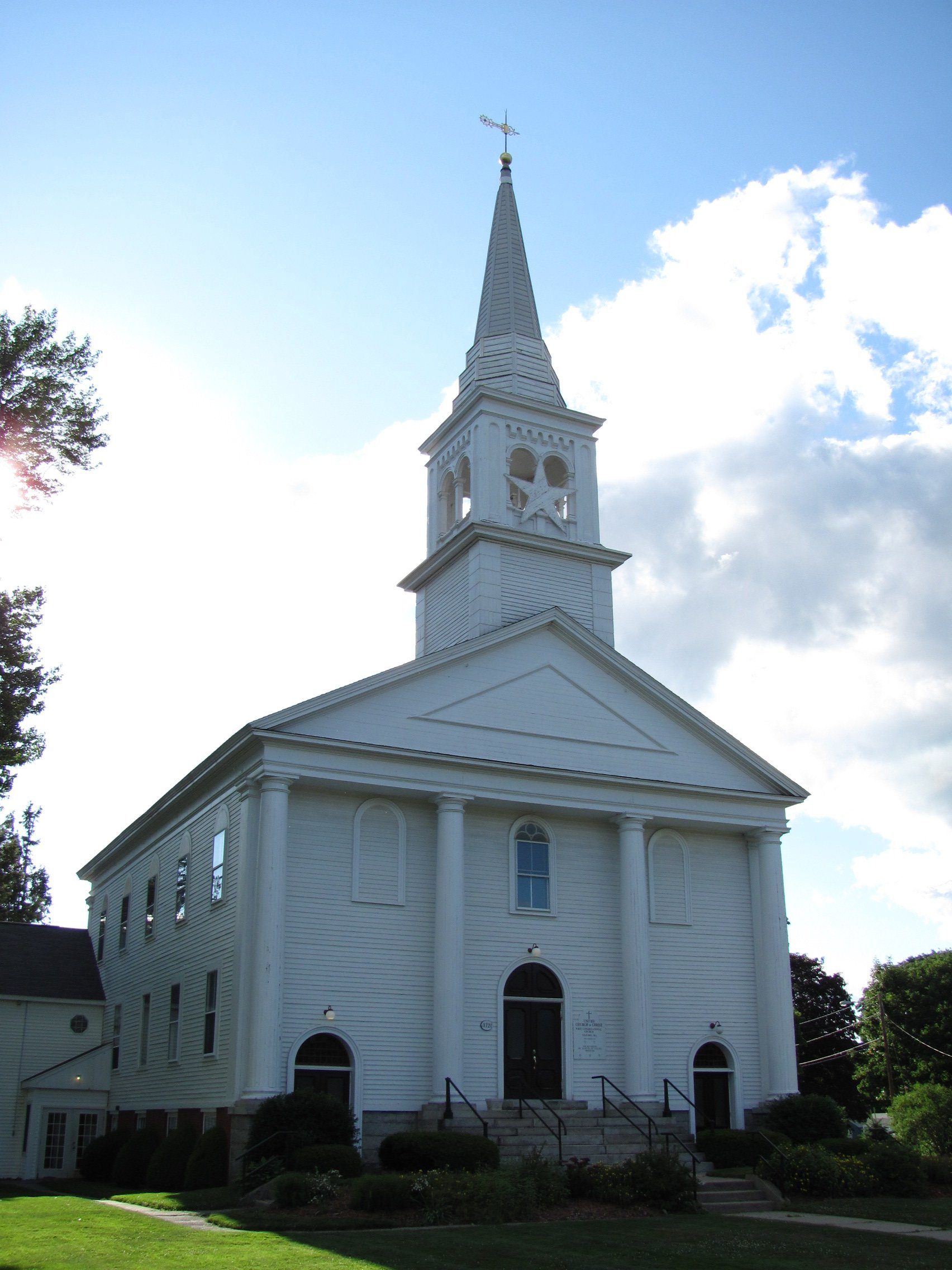
- First Congregational Church

- Location in Worcester County and the state of Massachusetts.
- Coordinates: 42°06′58″N 71°52′14″W
- Country: United States
- State: Massachusetts
- County: Worcester

Area
  - Total: 3.69 sq mi (9.55 km^{2})
  - Land: 3.46 sq mi (8.97 km^{2})
  - Water: 0.22 sq mi (0.58 km^{2})
- Elevation: 505 ft (154 m)

Population (2020)
  - Total: 5,928
  - Density: 1,711.2/sq mi (660.71/km^{2})
- Time zone: UTC-5 (Eastern (EST))
  - Summer (DST): UTC-4 (EDT)
- ZIP code: 01540
- Area code: 508
- FIPS code: 25-51790
- GNIS feature ID: 2378199

The geographic and demographic information on the census-designated place Oxford is different in that the CDP has a total area of 9.6 km^{2} (3.7 mi^{2}), of which 9.1 km^{2} (3.5 mi^{2}) is land and 0.6 km^{2} (0.2 mi^{2}) (5.91%) is water.

As of the census of 2000, in the CDP specifically there were 5,899 people, 2,282 households, and 1,567 families residing in the CDP. The population density was 650.7/km^{2} (1,683.9/mi^{2}). There were 2,370 housing units at an average density of 261.4/km^{2} (676.5/mi^{2}). The racial makeup of the CDP was 97.36% White, 0.51% Black or African American, 0.29% Native American, 0.46% Asian, 0.20% from other races, and 1.19% from two or more races. Hispanic or Latino of any race were 0.64% of the population.

There were 2,282 households, out of which 31.1% had children under the age of 18 living with them, 54.3% were married couples living together, 11.4% had a female householder with no husband present, and 31.3% were non-families. 26.7% of all households were made up of individuals, and 12.7% had someone living alone who was 65 years of age or older. The average household size was 2.55 and the average family size was 3.11.

In the CDP, the population was spread out, with 23.6% under the age of 18, 8.0% from 18 to 24, 30.2% from 25 to 44, 23.5% from 45 to 64, and 14.7% who were 65 years of age or older. The median age was 38 years. For every 100 females, there were 91.0 males. For every 100 females age 18 and over, there were 87.3 males.

The median income for a household in the CDP was $50,866, and the median income for a family was $58,030. Males had a median income of $42,306 versus $28,611 for females. The per capita income for the CDP was $21,149. About 5.8% of families and 9.8% of the population were below the poverty line, including 17.7% of those under age 18 and 5.5% of those age 65 or over.

== Local government ==
State government
State Representative(s):	Peter Durant (R), Paul K. Frost (R)
State Senator(s):	Ryan Fattman (R)
Governor's Councilor(s):	Paul DePalo (D)
Federal government
U.S. Representative(s):	James P. McGovern (D-2nd District),
U.S. Senators:	Elizabeth Warren (D), Ed Markey (D)

== Library ==
The Oxford public library was established in 1869. In fiscal year 2008, the town of Oxford spent 1.5% ($468,609) of its budget on its public library—approximately $34 per person, per year ($41.64 adjusted for inflation to 2021).

== Education ==
Oxford has a public school system with two elementary schools, one middle school, and one high school. The first elementary school is the Alfred M. Chaffee School, which offers kindergarten- 2nd grade education. The second elementary school is the Clara Barton School, which offers 3rd–5th grade education. The Oxford Middle School offers 6th–8th grade courses, and Oxford High School offers grades 9th –12th with preschool in the basement.

Oxford High School has a number of sports activities throughout the fall, winter and spring seasons. Some of these sports include, field hockey, cross country, football, soccer, indoor track, basketball, outdoor track, baseball, softball, golf, and ultimate frisbee.

== Points of interest ==
- Bartlett's Bridge
- Barton Center for Diabetes Education, site of the Clara Barton Camp for Diabetic Children and the Clara Barton National Historic Site
- Hodges Village Dam
- Hudson House
- Huguenot Fort
- Oxford High School

== Notable people ==
- Agnes Ballard, educator, early woman architect and first woman elected to office in Florida was born here
- Martha Ballard, midwife, healer, and diarist
- Michael Bartlett, internationally renowned tenor, star of Broadway, films, radio, opera, theatre and concert stage
- Clara Barton, teacher, nurse, humanitarian best remembered for organizing American Red Cross during the Civil War
- Carla Berube, college basketball player and coach
- Nelson H. Davis, brigadier general during American Civil War
- Tom Herrion, college basketball coach
- Elliott P. Joslin, doctor, pioneer in diabetes research
- Ebenezer Learned, general in American Revolution
- Tony Reno, college football coach
- Matthew Sands, educator
- Aron Stevens, wrestler and actor
- Elvira Stone, postmaster and genealogist
