= 2009 NCAA Division I men's basketball championship game =

American college basketball final

2009 NCAA Tournament Championship Game
National championship game
Michigan State Spartans	North Carolina Tar Heels
Big Ten	ACC
(31–6)	(33–4)
72	89
Head coach: Tom Izzo	Head coach: Roy Williams
- AP: 7
- Coaches: 7
- AP: 2
- Coaches: 3
	1st half	2nd half	Total
Michigan State Spartans	34	38	72
North Carolina Tar Heels	55	34	89
- Date: April 6, 2009
- Venue: Ford Field, Detroit, Michigan
- MVP: Wayne Ellington, North Carolina
- Favorite: North Carolina by 7.5
- Referees: Tom O'Neill, Curtis Shaw, Tony Greene
- Attendance: 72,922

United States TV coverage
- Network: CBS
- Announcers: Jim Nantz (play-by-play); Clark Kellogg (color); Tracy Wolfson (sideline)
- Nielsen Ratings: 10.8

The 2009 NCAA Division I men's basketball championship game was the final game of the 2009 NCAA Division I men's basketball tournament and determined the National Champion for the 2008-09 NCAA Division I men's basketball season. The game was played on April 6, 2009, at Ford Field in Detroit, Michigan as the final game of the Final Four. The game was played between the South Regional Champions, No. 1-seeded North Carolina, and the Midwest Regional Champions, No. 2-seeded Michigan State. The Tar Heels defeated the Spartans 89–72.

This game was a rematch of Basketbowl II of the 2008 ACC-Big Ten Challenge which was also played at Ford Field in which North Carolina also dominated Michigan State with a 98–63 victory.

== Participants ==
=== Michigan State Spartans ===
In their first game of the Tournament, Raymar Morgan scored 16 points to help the Spartans defeat Robert Morris 77–62. In the Second round of the Tournament, Travis Walton scored a career-high 18 points to help beat USC 74–69 and advance to the Sweet Sixteen. In the Sweet Sixteen, Michigan State came back from a 36–29 deficit at halftime and Kalin Lucas scored seven points during the final 49 seconds including making five straight free throws to beat Kansas 67–62 and advance to the Elite Eight. In the Elite Eight, the Spartans dominated No. 1-seeded Louisville, holding them to their second lowest point total of the season (52), only one shot in the final 5:18, and just 38.3 percent shooting in a 64–52 win. In the Final Four, Kalin Lucas scored 21 points and Raymar Morgan scored 18 points as Michigan State controlled the tempo of play with solid all-around play holding Connecticut to only 18 mid-range shots or 3-pointers only making three of those as Michigan State beat Connecticut 82–73.

Michigan State was the first team since Duke in 1994 to play the national championship game in their home state.

=== North Carolina Tar Heels ===
North Carolina got off to a hot start in the Tournament as Tyler Hansbrough scored 22 points to become the leading scorer in ACC history and Wayne Ellington scored 25 points to lead North Carolina to a 101–58 dominating win over Radford. In the Second round, Ty Lawson scored 23 points (21 of them coming in the second half) and once the game was tied at 63–63, North Carolina finished off with a 21–7 run to beat LSU 84–70. In the Sweet Sixteen, North Carolina went 11–19 on three-pointers while Tyler Hansbrough had a double-double with 24 points and 10 rebounds and Ty Lawson scored 19 points (17 in the first half) and had nine assists and one turnover as North Carolina defeated Gonzaga 98–77. In the Elite Eight, Ty Lawson led North Carolina with 19 points to beat Oklahoma 72–60 and advance to the Final Four. In the Final Four, Tyler Hansbrough had a double-double with 18 points and 11 rebounds which made him the sixth leading scorer in NCAA Tournament history and in addition, Ty Lawson scored 22 points and Wayne Ellington scored 20 points to beat Villanova 83–69 to advance to the national championship game.

North Carolina was the third team since 1985 to advance to the national championship game having won their previous five tournament games by 10 points or more. The other two teams were Duke in 2001 as they beat Arizona by 10 in the 2001 national championship game and Michigan State in 2000 as they beat Florida by 13 in the 2000 national championship game.

=== Team rosters ===
2008-09 Michigan State Spartans men's basketball roster
No.	Name	Position	Height	Weight	Class
00	Idong Ibok	C	6-11	260	Redshirt Sr.
1	Kalin Lucas	G	6-0	180	So.
2	Raymar Morgan	F	6-8	225	Jr.
3	Chris Allen	G	6-3	205	So.
5	Travis Walton	G	6-2	190	Sr.
10	Delvon Roe	F	6-8	225	Fr.
13	Austin Thornton	F	6-5	210	Redshirt Fr.
14	Goran Suton	F	6-10	245	Redshirt Sr.
15	Durrell Summers	G	6-4	195	So.
20	Mike Kebler	G	6-4	200	So.
22	Isaiah Dahlman	G	6-6	200	Jr.
23	Draymond Green	F	6-6	235	Fr.
25	Jon Crandell	F	6-8	225	Jr.
34	Korie Lucious	G	5-11	170	Fr.
40	Shaun Pruitt	C	7-0	240	Redshirt So.
41	Shaun Pruitt	F	6-8	235	Redshirt Sr.

2008-09 North Carolina Tar Heels roster
No.	Name	Position	Height	Weight	Class
1	Marcus Ginyard	G/F	6-5	220	Sr.
2	Marc Campbell	G	5-11	175	Jr.
4	Bobby Frasor	G	6-3	210	Sr.
5	Ty Lawson	G	5-11	195	Jr.
11	Larry Drew II	G	6-1	180	Fr.
13	Will Graves	G/F	6-6	245	So.
14	Danny Green	G/F	6-6	210	Sr.
15	J.B. Tanner	G	6-0	185	Sr.
21	Deon Thompson	F	6-8	245	Jr.
22	Wayne Ellington	G	6-4	200	Jr.
24	Justin Watts	G	6-4	205	Fr.
30	Jack Wooten	G	6-2	190	Sr.
32	Ed Davis	F	6-10	215	Fr.
35	Patrick Moody	F	6-4	195	Sr.
40	Mike Copeland	F	6-7	235	Sr.
44	Tyler Zeller	F	7-0	220	Fr.
50	Tyler Hansbrough	F	6-9	250	Sr.

== Starting lineups ==
Michigan State	Position		North Carolina
Kalin Lucas	G		† Ty Lawson
Travis Walton	G		Wayne Ellington
Delvon Roe	F		Danny Green
Raymar Morgan	F		Deon Thompson
Goran Suton	C	F	† Tyler Hansbrough
† 2009 Consensus First Team All-American

== Game summary ==
CBS

April 6, 2009
9:21 EDT

Box score

#S1 North Carolina Tar Heels 89, #MW2 Michigan State Spartans 72
Pts: Ty Lawson 21; Rebs: Ed Davis – 8 Asts: Ty Lawson – 6	Pts: Goran Suton – 17; Rebs: Goran Suton – 11; Asts: Kalin Lucas – 7 Halftime Score: North Carolina, 55–34

Ford Field, Detroit, Michigan
Attendance: 72,922
Referees: Tom O'Neill, Curtis Shaw, Tony Greene

North Carolina got hot early during the 2009 National Championship Game, as they got off to a 34–11 lead with 9:46 remaining in the 1st half. North Carolina kept their dominance going as they had a 55–34 lead at halftime, which marks the largest halftime lead in NCAA Tournament History and the most points scored in the 1st half in NCAA Tournament History. The game was over before it began as North Carolina had a 17–7 lead with 15:35 remaining in the 1st half, and the game never got closer. North Carolina won the game 89–72, as Tyler Hansbrough's 18 points, Wayne Ellington's 19 points, and Ty Lawson's 21 points all led to the rout of Michigan State to win the national championship.

By beating Michigan State by 17, North Carolina became the 1st team since Duke in 2001 to win all their NCAA Tournament games by double digits. Also, their +121 point differential during the 2009 NCAA Tournament was the 2nd highest since the tournament expanded to 64 teams in 1985, trailing Kentucky who had a +129 point differential during the 1996 NCAA tournament.
