= Michigan State Spartans men's basketball statistical leaders =

The Michigan State Spartans men's basketball statistical leaders are individual statistical leaders of the Michigan State Spartans men's basketball program in various categories, including points, rebounds, assists, steals, and blocks. Within those areas, the lists identify single-game, single-season, and career leaders. The Spartans represent Michigan State University in the NCAA's Big Ten Conference.

Michigan State began competing in intercollegiate basketball in 1898. However, the school's record book does not generally list records from before the 1950s, as records from before this period are often incomplete and inconsistent. Since scoring was much lower in this era, and teams played much fewer games during a typical season, it is likely that few or no players from this era would appear on these lists anyway.

The NCAA did not officially record assists as a stat until the 1983–84 season, and blocks and steals until the 1985–86 season, but Michigan State's record books includes players in these stats before these seasons. These lists are updated through the end of the 2020–21 season.

== Scoring ==
Career
Rk	Player	Points	Seasons
1	Shawn Respert	2,531	1990–91 1991–92 1992–93 1993–94 1994–95
2	Steve Smith	2,263	1987–88 1988–89 1989–90 1990–91
3	Scott Skiles	2,145	1982–83 1983–84 1984–85 1985–86
4	Greg Kelser	2,014	1975–76 1976–77 1977–78 1978–79
5	Kalin Lucas	1,996	2007–08 2008–09 2009–10 2010–11
6	Cassius Winston	1,969	2016–17 2017–18 2018–19 2019–20
7	Jay Vincent	1,914	1977–78 1978–79 1979–80 1980–81
8	Sam Vincent	1,851	1981–82 1982–83 1983–84 1984–85
9	Terry Furlow	1,777	1972–73 1973–74 1974–75 1975–76
10	Paul Davis	1,718	2002–03 2003–04 2004–05 2005–06

Season
Rk	Player	Points	Season
1	Scott Skiles	850	1985–86
2	Terry Furlow	793	1975–76
3	Shawn Respert	778	1993–94
4	Steve Smith	752	1990–91
5	Cassius Winston	733	2018–19
6	Shawn Respert	716	1994–95
7	Ralph Simpson	667	1969–70
8	Sam Vincent	666	1984–85
9	Morris Peterson	657	1999-00
10	Maurice Ager	656	2005–06

Single game
Rk	Player	Points	Season	Opponent
1	Terry Furlow	50	1975–76	Iowa
2	Terry Furlow	48	1975–76	Northwestern
3	Scott Skiles	45	1985–86	Minnesota
	Julius McCoy	45	1955–56	Notre Dame
5	Shawn Respert	43	1993–94	Minnesota
	Scott Skiles	43	1985–86	Ohio State
7	Darryl Johnson	42	1986–87	BYU
	Terry Furlow	42	1975–76	Ohio State
	Ralph Simpson	42	1969–70	Western Michigan
10	Adreian Payne	41	2013–14	Delaware
	Terry Furlow	41	1975–76	Detroit
	Rudy Benjamin	41	1970–71	Butler
	Julius McCoy	41	1955–56	Michigan

== Rebounds ==
Career
Rk	Player	Rebounds	Seasons
1	Draymond Green	1,096	2008–09 2009–10 2010–11 2011–12
2	Greg Kelser	1,092	1975–76 1976–77 1977–78 1978–79
3	Johnny Green	1,036	1956–57 1957–58 1958–59
4	Antonio Smith	1,016	1995–96 1996–97 1997–98 1998–99
5	Paul Davis	910	2002–03 2003–04 2004–05 2005–06
6	Mike Peplowski	906	1989–90 1990–91 1991–92 1992–93
7	Branden Dawson	902	2011–12 2012–13 2013–14 2014–15
8	Goran Suton	887	2005–06 2006–07 2007–08 2008–09
9	Denzel Valentine	856	2012–13 2013–14 2014–15 2015–16
10	Andre Hutson	835	1997–98 1998–99 1999-00 2000–01

Season
Rk	Player	Rebounds	Season
1	Draymond Green	394	2011–12
2	Johnny Green	392	1957–58
3	Johnny Green	382	1958–59
4	Horace Walker	373	1959–60
5	Lindsay Hairston	326	1973–74
6	Xavier Tillman	320	2019–20
7	Antonio Smith	319	1998–99
8	Branden Dawson	318	2014–15
9	Horace Walker	312	1958–59
	Jaxon Kohler	312	2025–26

Single game
Rk	Player	Rebounds	Season	Opponent
1	Horace Walker	29	1959–60	Butler
	Johnny Green	29	1957–58	Washington
3	Horace Walker	28	1959–60	Iowa
	Johnny Green	28	1957–58	USC
5	Greg Kelser	27	1975–76	Wisconsin
6	Horace Walker	26	1959–60	Indiana
	Keith Stackhouse	26	1951–52	Minnesota
8	Ted Williams	25	1960–61	Michigan
	Johnny Green	25	1958–59	Purdue
10	Horace Walker	24	1959–60	Michigan
	Horace Walker	24	1958–59	Northwestern
	Johnny Green	24	1958–59	Iowa
	Johnny Green	24	1957–58	Indiana
	Horace Walker	24	1958–59	Notre Dame

== Assists ==
Career
Rk	Player	Assists	Seasons
1	Cassius Winston	890	2016–17 2017–18 2018–19 2019–20
2	Mateen Cleaves	816	1996–97 1997–98 1998–99 1999-00
3	Scott Skiles	645	1982–83 1983–84 1984–85 1985–86
4	Denzel Valentine	639	2012–13 2013–14 2014–15 2015–16
5	Jeremy Fears Jr.	620	2023–24 2024–25 2025–26 2026–27
6	A.J. Hoggard	609	2020–21 2021–22 2022–23 2023–24
7	Eric Snow	599	1991–92 1992–93 1993–94 1994–95
8	Drew Neitzel	582	2004–05 2005–06 2006–07 2007–08
9	Mark Montgomery	561	1988–89 1989–90 1990–91 1991–92
10	Kalin Lucas	558	2007–08 2008–09 2009–10 2010–11

Season
Rk	Player	Assists	Season
1	Jeremy Fears Jr.	328	2025–26
2	Cassius Winston	291	2018–19
3	Mateen Cleaves	274	1998–99
4	Earvin Johnson	269	1978–79
5	Cassius Winston	241	2017–18
	Denzel Valentine	241	2015–16
7	Earvin Johnson	222	1977–78
8	Mateen Cleaves	217	1997–98
	Eric Snow	217	1994–95
10	Eric Snow	213	1993–94

Single game
Rk	Player	Assists	Season	Opponent
1	Mateen Cleaves	20	1999-00	Michigan
2	Gary Ganakas	17	1972–73	Rochester
	Jeremy Fears Jr.	17	2025–26	Maryland
4	Jeremy Fears Jr.	16	2025–26	Louisville
5	Jeremy Fears Jr.	15	2025–26	Illinois
6	Earvin Johnson	14	1978–79	Wisconsin
	Earvin Johnson	14	1978–79	Western Michigan
	Earvin Johnson	14	1977–78	Western Kentucky
	A.J. Hoggard	14	2022–23	Nebraska
	Jeremy Fears Jr.	14	2025–26	UCLA

== Steals ==
Career
Rk	Player	Steals	Seasons
1	Mateen Cleaves	195	1996–97 1997–98 1998–99 1999-00
2	Draymond Green	180	2008–09 2009–10 2010–11 2011–12
3	Scott Skiles	175	1982–83 1983–84 1984–85 1985–86
4	Mark Montgomery	168	1988–89 1989–90 1990–91 1991–92
5	Travis Walton	167	2005–06 2006–07 2007–08 2008–09
6	Branden Dawson	163	2011–12 2012–13 2013–14 2014–15
7	Chris Hill	162	2001–02 2002–03 2003–04 2004–05
8	Sam Vincent	159	1981–82 1982–83 1983–84 1984–85
9	Keith Appling	151	2010–11 2011–12 2012–13 2013–14
10	Ken Redfield	150	1986–87 1987–88 1988–89 1989–90

Season
Rk	Player	Steals	Season
1	Earvin Johnson	75	1978–79
2	Mateen Cleaves	73	1997–98
3	Earvin Johnson	71	1977–78
4	Mateen Cleaves	69	1998–99
5	Tyson Walker	64	2023–24
6	Gary Harris	63	2013–14
7	Draymond Green	60	2010–11
	Darryl Johnson	60	1986–87
9	Branden Dawson	57	2012–13
	Eric Snow	57	1993–94

Single game
Rk	Player	Steals	Season	Opponent
1	Mateen Cleaves	9	1997–98	Minnesota
2	Darryl Johnson	8	1986–87	Ohio State
	Greg Kelser	8	1975–76	Northwestern
4	Jason Richardson	7	2000–01	Purdue
	Greg Kelser	7	1977–78	Indiana
	Earvin Johnson	7	1977–78	Michigan

== Blocks ==
Career
Rk	Player	Blocks	Seasons
1	Marcus Bingham Jr.	168	2018–19 2019–20 2020–21 2021–22
2	Xavier Tillman	153	2017–18 2018–19 2019–20
3	Matt Costello	146	2012–13 2013–14 2014–15 2015–16
4	Nick Ward	143	2016–17 2017–18 2018–19
5	Branden Dawson	142	2011–12 2012–13 2013–14 2014–15
6	Adreian Payne	141	2010–11 2011–12 2012–13 2013–14
7	Drew Naymick	134	2004–05 2005–06 2006–07 2007–08
8	Draymond Green	117	2008–09 2009–10 2010–11 2011–12
9	Delvon Roe	106	2007–08 2008–09 2009–10
	Jaren Jackson Jr.	106	2017–18

Season
Rk	Player	Blocks	Season
1	Jaren Jackson Jr.	106	2017–18
2	Marcus Bingham Jr.	77	2021–22
3	Ken Johnson	72	1984–85
4	Xavier Tillman	65	2018–19
	Xavier Tillman	65	2019–20
6	Deyonta Davis	64	2015–16
7	Drew Naymick	60	2007–08
8	Branden Dawson	58	2014–15
9	Drew Naymick	55	2006–07
10	Nick Ward	54	2016–17

Single game
Rk	Player	Blocks	Season	Opponent
1	Jaren Jackson Jr.	8	2017–18	Rutgers
	Kenny Goins	8	2018–19	Indiana
	Ken Johnson	8	1984–85	San Diego State
4	Jaren Jackson Jr.	7	2017–18	Indiana
	Marcus Bingham Jr.	7	2021–22	Loyola (IL)
6	Marcus Bingham Jr.	6	2021–22	Butler
	Marcus Bingham Jr.	6	2021–22	Eastern Michigan
	Xavier Tillman	6	2019–20	Michigan
	Deyonta Davis	6	2015–16	Northwestern
	Matt Costello	6	2013–14	Illinois
	Draymond Green	6	2012–13	Lehigh
	Drew Naymick	6	2007–08	Northwestern
	Ken Johnson	6	1984–85	Purdue
