= 2008–09 Michigan State Spartans men's basketball team =

American college basketball season

2008–09 Michigan State Spartans men's basketball

NCAA tournament, Runner-up Big Ten regular season champions

National Championship Game, L 72-89 vs. North Carolina
- Conference: Big Ten Conference

Ranking
- Coaches: No. 2
- AP: No. 8
- Record: 31–7 (15–3 Big Ten)
- Head coach: Tom Izzo (14th season)
- Associate head coach: Mark Montgomery (8th season)
- Assistant coaches: Dwayne Stephens (6th season); Mike Garland (2nd season)
- Captains: Kalin Lucas; Travis Walton
- Home arena: Breslin Center

2008–09 Big Ten Conference men's basketball standings
| | Conf. | | | | Overall |
| Team | W | | L | PCT | W | | L | PCT |
|---|---|---|---|---|---|---|---|---|
| No. 8 Michigan State | 15 | – | 3 | .833 | 31 | – | 7 | .816 |
| No. 17 Purdue† | 11 | – | 7 | .611 | 27 | – | 10 | .730 |
| Illinois | 11 | – | 7 | .611 | 24 | – | 10 | .706 |
| Penn State | 10 | – | 8 | .556 | 27 | – | 11 | .711 |
| Ohio State | 10 | – | 8 | .556 | 22 | – | 11 | .667 |
| Wisconsin | 10 | – | 8 | .556 | 20 | – | 13 | .606 |
| Minnesota | 9 | – | 9 | .500 | 22 | – | 11 | .667 |
| Michigan | 9 | – | 9 | .500 | 21 | – | 14 | .600 |
| Northwestern | 8 | – | 10 | .444 | 17 | – | 14 | .548 |
| Iowa | 5 | – | 13 | .278 | 15 | – | 17 | .469 |
| Indiana | 1 | – | 17 | .056 | 6 | – | 25 | .194 |
† 2009 Big Ten tournament winner Rankings from AP poll

The 2008–09 Michigan State Spartans men's basketball team represented Michigan State University in the 2008–09 NCAA Division I men's basketball season. They were led by head coach Tom Izzo who was in his 14th year as head coach. The team played their home games at the Breslin Center in East Lansing, Michigan and were member of the Big Ten Conference. MSU finished the season 31–7, 15–3 in Big Ten play to win the Big Ten regular season championship by four games. They defeated Minnesota in the quarterfinals of the Big Ten tournament before losing to Ohio State in the semifinals. The Spartans received their 12th-straight NCAA tournament bid, an at-large bid as the No. 2 seed in the Midwest region. They defeated Robert Morris, USC, Kansas, and Louisville to advance to the Final Four for the fifth time under Izzo. In the Final Four, they defeated UConn to advance to the National Championship game where they lost to North Carolina.

== Previous season ==
The Spartans finished the 2007–08 season 27–9, 12–6 in Big Ten play to finish in fourth place. Michigan State received a No. 5 seed in the NCAA tournament, their 11th straight trip to the Tournament, and advanced to the Sweet Sixteen, their seventh trip under Tom Izzo, before losing to Memphis.

The Spartans lost Drew Neitzel (13.9 points and 4 assists per game) to graduation following the season.

== 2008 recruiting class ==
College recruiting
| Name | Hometown | School | Height | Weight | Commit date |
|---|---|---|---|---|---|
| Delvon Roe #5 PF | Lakewood, Ohio | St. Edward High School | 6 ft 8 in (2.03 m) | 220 lb (100 kg) | Apr 17, 2007 |
| Delvon Roe #5 PF | Recruit ratings: Scout: Rivals: (96) | | | | |
| Draymond Green #13 PF | Saginaw, Michigan | Saginaw HS | 6 ft 6 in (1.98 m) | 225 lb (102 kg) | Jun 28, 2007 |
| Draymond Green #13 PF | Recruit ratings: Scout: Rivals: (96) | | | | |
| Korie Lucious #10 PG | Milwaukee | Pius XI HS | 5 ft 10 in (1.78 m) | 165 lb (75 kg) | Sep 24, 2006 |
| Korie Lucious #10 PG | Recruit ratings: Scout: Rivals: (93) | | | | |
Overall recruit ranking: Scout: 17 Rivals: 22
Note: In many cases, Scout, Rivals, 247Sports, On3, and ESPN may conflict in their listings of height and weight.; In these cases, the average was taken. ESPN grades are on a 100-point scale.; Sources: "Michigan State Commit List for 2008". Rivals.; "Men's Basketball Recruiting". Scout.; "ESPN – Michigan State Spartans Basketball Recruiting 2008". ESPN.; "Scout.com Team Recruiting Rankings". Scout.; "2008 Team Ranking". Rivals.

== Season summary ==
Michigan State was led by sophomore Kalin Lucas (14.7 points and 4.6 assists per game), junior Raymar Morgan (10.2 points and 5.3 rebounds per game), and senior Goran Suton (10.4 points and 8.4 rebounds per game).

=== Regular season ===
The team began the season ranked No. 6 in the country and began the season well with home wins against Idaho and IPFW (coached by future MSU assistant coach Dane Fife).

The Spartans next traveled to Florida to participate in the Old Spice Classic. In the first round, they faced unranked Maryland who controlled the game, defeating MSU 80–62. The Spartans rebounded from the loss to Maryland by beating Oklahoma State 94–79 in the consolation bracket. In the consolation championship, MSU defeated Wichita State 65–57 behind 12 points from Marquise Gray.

The Spartans then faced No. 1 North Carolina in the Big Ten-ACC Challenge at the site of the upcoming Final Four, Ford Field. There, MSU was blown out, 98–63. Izzo took the blame for the loss, "The blame goes on me for the scheduling. We were dead."

Michigan State returned home after playing five straight games away from the Breslin Center. Following easy wins over Bradley, Alcorn State, and The Citadel, MSU then went on the road again to face No. 5-ranked Texas at the Toyota Center in Houston, Texas. MSU, ranked 19th in the AP poll, were led by Goran Suton's 18 points, but still trailed as time wound down in the game. Durrell Summers hit a three-pointer with 18.6 second remaining to help pull out a 67–63 win.

The Spartans next defeated Oakland at the Palace of Auburn Hills in Detroit, 82–66, to move to 9–2 and were ranked No. 10 in the country to finish the non-conference schedule.

MSU opened conference play on New Year's Eve with a win over No. 21 Minnesota behind a career-high 24 points from Kalin Lucas. Wins over Northwestern and Ohio State followed before the Spartans stepped back out of conference to welcome defending national champion Kansas to the Breslin Center on January 11. MSU fell behind early 7–1 and 11–6, but fought back before taking control of the game at the half with a 37–18 lead. Lucas again led the Spartans, scoring 22 points as the Spartans won 75–62 for their ninth straight win, pushing their record to 13–2 on the season.

Wins over Penn State and No. 20 Illinois pushed the win streak to 11. Prior to the win over Illinois, the Spartans retired Morris Peterson's jersey. The win over Illinois also gave MSU a 5–0 record in Big Ten play, their best start in conference since 1978. Looking to extend their win streak to 12 games, MSU welcomed Northwestern to the Breslin Centeron January 21. The Spartans, hampered by Raymar Morgan's sickness, were stunned by Northwestern, losing 70–63. The loss ended the Spartans 28-game home winning streak as well and left them at 5–1 in conference, 15–3 overall.

MSU returned to their winning ways defeating Ohio State and Iowa on the road to mark five straight Big Ten road wins. Another surprising loss at home, this time to Penn State, preceded a second win over No. 21-ranked Minnesota. At 18–4 and 8–2 on the season, the Spartans returned to the top ten rankings, moving to No. 9 in the AP poll. The Spartans then welcomed former Izzo assistant Tom Crean, coach of Indiana, to the Breslin Center on February 7. MSU, led by freshman Draymond Green's 15 points and 12 rebounds, blew out the Hoosiers, 75–47.

The Spartans then took their perfect road record to Michigan. MSU led the majority of the game, but Michigan rallied to within four with under five minutes remaining. But Kalin Lucas, who scored 13 of his 15 points after half time, made a three to extend the lead and Delvon Roe scored a season-high 14 points as MSU won 54–42.

The win over Michigan moved MSU to No. 6 in the AP poll (No. 5 in the Coaches Poll) and set up an important road game against No. 19 Purdue. The Boilermakers forced 22 Spartan turnovers, blocked eight shots and held MSU to 33% from the field. Lucas scored 13 for MSU, but it wasn't enough as they were blown out 72–54. The Purdue loss broke the road-winning streak, but still left MSU at 20–5 and 10–3 in conference.

The Purdue loss would also mark the last regular season loss by the Spartans. Wins over Wisconsin and Iowa preceded the No. 9-ranked Spartans trip to No. 20 Illinois. Lucas led the Spartans again with 18 points as they defeated Illinois 74–66 clinching a share of the Big Ten regular season championship. With a 64–59 win at Indiana on March 3, the Spartans won their first Big Ten regular season title since 2001 and first outright title since 1999. In the final game of the season, a 62–51 win over No. 19 Purdue, Lucas scored 21 points to lead MSU to the Big Ten championship by four games with a 15–3 record, 25–5 overall, and ranked No. 7 in the country.

Following the conclusion of the regular season, Kalin Lucas was named Big Ten Player of the Year and Tom Izzo was voted Big Ten Coach of the Year. Travis Walton was named Defensive Player of the Year, while Goran Suton was a second team All-Big Ten selection. Delvon Roe was named to the Big Ten freshmen team.

=== Big Ten tournament ===
As the No. 1 seed in the Big Ten tournament, MSU had a bye into the quarterfinals. Looking to make their case for a No. 1 seed in the NCAA Tournament, MSU defeated No. 8-seeded Minnesota 64–56 led by Chris Allen's 17 points. The win moved the Spartans to the Big Ten semifinals to face Ohio State. However, Michigan State's hopes for a No. 1 seed in the NCAA Tournament vanished as they were defeated by Ohio State, 82–70. Evan Turner had 18 points to lead the Buckeyes to win the over the Spartans, who shot just 38 percent from the field.

=== NCAA Tournament ===
Michigan State received an at-large bid as the No. 2 seed in the Midwest Region of the NCAA tournament, their 12th straight appearance in the Tournament. Though they only received a No. 2 seed, the path to the Final Four looked good for the Spartans with games in Minneapolis, Minnesota and Indianapolis, Indiana before the Final Four in Detroit.

In the First Round, the Spartans defeated No. 15-seed Robert Morris 77–62 behind Raymar Morgan's 16 points and Goran Suton's 11 points and 17 rebounds. Draymond Green added 16 points in the easy win. In the Second Round, MSU faced No. 10-seed USC for the right to advance to the Sweet Sixteen. With a surprising offensive output by Travis Walton, scoring a career-high 18 points, the Spartans were able to hold off USC to advance to the Sweet Sixteen.

In the Sweet Sixteen, MSU faced No. 14-ranked and No. 3-seeded Kansas, marking MSU's eighth trip to the Sweet Sixteen in the previous 12 years. The game was held in Indianapolis where MSU was 5–0 all-time in NCAA Tournament games. Michigan State trailed by as many as 13 in the first half as Lucas struggled from the field. MSU trailed 36–29 at the half, but started strong in the second half as Draymond Green cut the Kansas lead to just one point just three minutes into the half. Lucas sealed the win by scoring seven points in the final 49 seconds of the game (going five for five from the free throw line) as MSU advanced to the Elite Eight with a 67–62 win.

In the Elite Eight, the Spartans faced overall No. 1 seed Louisville with a chance to go to the Final Four in nearby Detroit, only 90 miles from MSU's campus. Led by MSU's rugged defense, Louisville, who had scored 103 points in their win over Arizona in the Sweet Sixteen, was held to 52 points and lost for the first time in 14 games. The Spartans, who slowed the game down, were led by Suton's 19 points and 10 rebounds and won 64–52. The win sent MSU to the Final Four for the fifth time in 11 seasons. "Detroit, here we come," said coach Tom Izzo, a Michigan native. "I can't tell you how much I'm looking forward to that." Durrell Summers contributed 10 second-half points in the win.

In Detroit for the Final Four, the Spartans practiced before a crowd of over 30,000 fans as they were clearly the hometown favorites. In the national semifinals, Michigan State faced Connecticut, another No. 1 seed, for the right to play for the national championship. Kalin Lucas led the Spartans with 21 points and Raymar Morgan added 18 as the smaller Spartans took it to the much bigger Huskies, led by Hasheem Thabeet. MSU led by two at the half and pulled away in the second to win 82–73 to advance to the national championship game. In contrast to the slowed down play against Louisville in the Elite Eight, MSU pushed the ball and wore out Thabeet and the Huskies.

In the National Championship game, the Spartans were rematched with North Carolina, whom they had also lost to earlier in the season at Ford Field. Michigan State was appearing in only its third national championship game, going 2–0 in prior trips while winning the 1979 and 2000 Tournaments. Further, under Tom Izzo, MSU was 14–2 in the second game of a weekend in NCAA Tournament play. However, the game started horribly for MSU as North Carolina jumped out to a lead of 17–7 in the first five minutes and extend the lead to 24–7 with 14 minutes remaining in the half. North Carolina scored more points than any team had ever scored in the first half of an NCAA championship game, scoring 55 and blowing out the Spartans 55–34 at the half. MSU's 14 turnovers in the first half aided the Tar Heels 52.9% shooting. The Spartans only made 12 baskets in the first half. The Spartans held UNC in check more in the second half, outscoring the Tar Heels 38–34, but it was too little too late. The Spartans were defeated by North Carolina 89–72, marking the Spartans' first ever loss in the national championship game.

The Spartans faced three No. 1 seeds (Louisville, UConn, and North Carolina) in the Tournament, only losing to North Carolina.

== Roster ==
2008–09 Michigan State Spartans men's basketball team
Players
Coaches

| Pos. | # | Name | Height | Weight | Year | Previous school | Hometown |
|---|---|---|---|---|---|---|---|
| C | 00 | Idong Ibok | 6 ft 11 in (2.11 m) | 265 lb (120 kg) | RS Sr | Montverde Academy | Montverde, Florida |
| PG | 1 | Kalin Lucas | 6 ft 0 in (1.83 m) | 180 lb (82 kg) | So | St. Mary Preparatory School | Orchard Lake, Michigan |
| PF | 2 | Raymar Morgan | 6 ft 7 in (2.01 m) | 225 lb (102 kg) | Jr | McKinley H.S. | Canton, Ohio |
| SG | 3 | Chris Allen | 6 ft 3 in (1.91 m) | 200 lb (91 kg) | So | Meadowcreek H.S. | Norcross, Georgia |
| PG | 5 | Travis Walton | 6 ft 2 in (1.88 m) | 195 lb (88 kg) | Sr | Lima H.S. | Lima, Ohio |
| F | 10 | Delvon Roe | 6 ft 8 in (2.03 m) | 220 lb (100 kg) | Fr | St. Edward H.S. | Lakewood, Ohio |
| SG | 13 | Austin Thornton | 6 ft 5 in (1.96 m) | 190 lb (86 kg) | RS Fr | Cedar Springs H.S. | Cedar Springs, Michigan |
| C | 14 | Goran Suton | 6 ft 10 in (2.08 m) | 245 lb (111 kg) | RS Sr | Everett H.S. | Lansing, Michigan |
| SF | 15 | Durrell Summers | 6 ft 4.5 in (1.94 m) | 175 lb (79 kg) | So | Covenant H.S. | Redford, Michigan |
| | 20 | Mike Kebler | — | — | So |
| SF | 22 | Isaiah Dahlman | 6 ft 6 in (1.98 m) | 185 lb (84 kg) | Jr | Braham Area Sec. | Braham, Minnesota |
| F | 23 | Draymond Green | 6 ft 7 in (2.01 m) | 240 lb (109 kg) | Fr | Saginaw H.S. | Saginaw, Michigan |
| | 25 | Jon Crandell | — | — | Jr | Rochester Adams H.S. | Rochester Hills, Michigan |
| PG | 34 | Korie Lucious | 5 ft 11 in (1.8 m) | 170 lb (77 kg) | Fr | Pius XI H.S. | Milwaukee, Wisconsin |
| C | 40 | Tom Herzog | 7 ft 0 in (2.13 m) | 230 lb (104 kg) | RS So | Luke M. Powers Catholic H.S. | Flint, Michigan |
| PF | 41 | Marquise Gray | 6 ft 8 in (2.03 m) | 235 lb (107 kg) | RS Sr | Beecher H.S. | Flint, Michigan |

Head coach

- Tom Izzo (Northern Michigan)

Assistant coach(es)

- Mark Montgomery (Michigan State)
- Dwayne Stephens (Michigan State)
- Mike Garland (Northern Michigan)

Legend

- (C) Team captain
- (S) Suspended
- (I) Ineligible
- (W) Walk-on
- Injured
- Current redshirt

Roster
Last update: 2010-11-07

== Schedule and results ==
| Date time, TV | Rank^{#} | Opponent^{#} | Result | Record | Site (attendance) city, state |
Regular season
| Nov 6, 2008*; 6:00 pm, BTN | No. 6 | Idaho | W 100–62 | 1–0 | Breslin Center (14,759); East Lansing, MI |
| Nov 19, 2008*; 7:00 pm | No. 5 | at IPFW | W 70–59 | 2–0 | Allen County War Memorial Coliseum (6,704); Fort Wayne, IN |
| Nov 27, 2008*; 7:00 pm, ESPN2 | No. 5 | vs. Maryland; Old Spice Classic | L 62–80 | 2–1 | The Milk House (4,464); Kissimmee, FL |
| Nov 28, 2008*; 8:00 pm, ESPNU | No. 5 | vs. Oklahoma State; Old Spice Classic | W 94–79 | 3–1 | Milk House (4,658); Kissimmee, FL |
| Nov 30, 2008*; 1:00 pm, ESPNU | No. 5 | vs. Wichita State; Old Spice Classic | W 65–57 | 4–1 | Milk House (3,768); Kissimmee, FL |
| Dec 3, 2008*; 9:00 pm, ESPN | No. 13 | vs. No. 1 North Carolina; ACC–Big Ten Challenge | L 63–98 | 4–2 | Ford Field (25,267); Detroit, MI |
| Dec 7, 2008*; 4:00 pm, BTN | No. 13 | Bradley | W 75–59 | 5–2 | Breslin Center (14,759); East Lansing, MI |
| Dec 13, 2008*; 6:00 pm, BTN | No. 18 | Alcorn State | W 118–60 | 6–2 | Breslin Center (14,759); East Lansing, MI |
| Dec 17, 2008*; 8:00 pm, BTN | No. 19 | The Citadel | W 79–65 | 7–2 | Breslin Center (14,759); East Lansing, MI |
| Dec 20, 2008*; 2:00 pm, CBS | No. 19 | at No. 5 Texas | W 67–63 | 8–2 | Toyota Center (17,074); Houston, TX |
| Dec 27, 2008*; 5:00 pm, FSD | No. 11 | vs. Oakland | W 82–66 | 9–2 | Palace of Auburn Hills (15,361); Auburn Hills, MI |
| Dec 31, 2008; 12:00 pm, BTN | No. 10 | at No. 21 Minnesota | W 70–58 | 10–2 (1–0) | Williams Arena (14,625); Minneapolis, MN |
| Jan 3, 2009; 7:00 pm, BTN | No. 10 | at Northwestern | W 77–66 | 11–2 (2–0) | Welsh-Ryan Arena (8,117); Evanston, IL |
| Jan 6, 2009; 7:00 pm, ESPN2 | No. 8 | Ohio State | W 67–58 | 12–2 (3–0) | Breslin Center (14,759); East Lansing, MI |
| Jan 10, 2009*; 1:00 pm, CBS | No. 8 | Kansas | W 75–62 | 13–2 | Breslin Center (14,759); East Lansing, MI |
| Jan 14, 2009; 6:30 pm, BTN | No. 7 | at Penn State | W 78–73 | 14–2 (4–0) | Bryce Jordan Center (10,270); University Park, PA |
| Jan 17, 2009; 4:00 pm, ESPN | No. 7 | Illinois | W 63–57 | 15–2 (5–0) | Breslin Center (14,759); East Lansing, MI |
| Jan 21, 2009; 6:30 pm, BTN | No. 7 | Northwestern | L 63–70 | 15–3 (5–1) | Breslin Center (14,759); East Lansing, MI |
| Jan 25, 2009; 3:45 pm, CBS | No. 7 | at Ohio State | W 78–67 | 16–3 (6–1) | Value City Arena (18,767); Columbus, OH |
| Jan 29, 2009; 7:00 pm, ESPN | No. 9 | at Iowa | W 71–56 | 17–3 (7–1) | Carver–Hawkeye Arena (13,640); Iowa City, IA |
| Feb 1, 2009; 12:00 pm, BTN | No. 9 | Penn State | L 68–72 | 17–4 (7–2) | Breslin Center (14,759); East Lansing, MI |
| Feb 4, 2009; 8:30 pm, BTN | No. 13 | No. 19 Minnesota | W 76–47 | 18–4 (8–2) | Breslin Center (14,759); East Lansing, MI |
| Feb 7, 2009; 4:00 pm, ESPN | No. 13 | Indiana | W 75–47 | 19–4 (9–2) | Breslin Center (14,759); East Lansing, MI |
| Feb 10, 2009; 7:00 pm, ESPN | No. 9 | at Michigan; Rivalry | W 54–42 | 20–4 (10–2) | Crisler Arena (13,751); Ann Arbor, MI |
| Feb 17, 2009; 7:00 pm, ESPN | No. 6 | at No. 21 Purdue | L 54–73 | 20–5 (10–3) | Mackey Arena (14,123); West Lafayette, IN |
| Feb 22, 2009; 3:00 pm, ESPN | No. 6 | Wisconsin | W 61–50 | 21–5 (11–3) | Breslin Center (14,759); East Lansing, MI |
| Feb 25, 2009; 8:30 pm, BTN | No. 9 | Iowa | W 62–54 | 22–5 (12–3) | Breslin Center (14,759); East Lansing, MI |
| Mar 1, 2009; 4:00 pm, CBS | No. 9 | at No. 20 Illinois | W 74–66 | 23–5 (13–3) | Assembly Hall (16,618); Champaign, IL |
| Mar 3, 2009; 7:00 pm, ESPN | No. 8 | at Indiana | W 64–59 | 24–5 (14–3) | Assembly Hall (15,006); Bloomington, IN |
| Mar 8, 2009; 12:00 pm, CBS | No. 8 | No. 20 Purdue | W 62–51 | 25–5 (15–3) | Breslin Center (14,759); East Lansing, MI |
Big Ten tournament
| Mar 13, 2009; 12:00 pm, ESPN | (1) No. 7 | vs. (8) Minnesota; Quarterfinals | W 64–56 | 26–5 | Conseco Fieldhouse (13,023); Indianapolis, IN |
| Mar 14, 2009; 1:40 pm, CBS | (1) No. 7 | vs. (5) Ohio State; Semifinals | L 70–82 | 26–6 | Conseco Fieldhouse (15,728); Indianapolis, IN |
NCAA tournament
| Mar 20, 2009; 9:50 pm, CBS | (2 MW) No. 8 | vs. (15 MW) Robert Morris; First Round | W 77–62 | 27–6 | Hubert H. Humphrey Metrodome (12,814); Minneapolis, MN |
| Mar 22, 2009; 4:55 pm, CBS | (2 MW) No. 8 | vs. (10 MW) USC; Second Round | W 74–69 | 28–6 | Hubert H. Humphrey Metrodome (14,279); Minneapolis, MN |
| March 27, 2009*; 9:37 pm, CBS | (2 MW) No. 8 | vs. (3 MW) No. 13 Kansas; Sweet Sixteen | W 67–62 | 29–6 | Lucas Oil Stadium (33,780); Indianapolis, IN |
| March 29, 2009*; 2:20 pm, CBS | (2 MW) No. 8 | vs. (1 MW) No. 1 Louisville; Elite Eight | W 64–52 | 30–6 | Lucas Oil Stadium (36,084); Indianapolis, IN |
| April 4, 2009*; 6:07 pm, CBS | (2 MW) No. 8 | vs. (1 W) No. 6 Connecticut; Final Four | W 82–73 | 31–6 | Ford Field (72,456); Detroit, MI |
| April 6, 2009*; 9:21 pm, CBS | (2 MW) No. 8 | vs. (1 S) No. 3 North Carolina; National Championship | L 72–89 | 31–7 | Ford Field (72,922); Detroit, MI |
*Non-conference game. ^{#}Rankings from AP Poll; Source. (#) Tournament seedings in parentheses.

== Player statistics ==
Individual player statistics (Final)
| | | Scoring | | Total FGs | | | 3-point FGs | | | Free-Throws | | | Rebounds | | | | | |
| Player | GP | Pts | Avg | FG | FGA | Pct | 3FG | 3FA | Pct | FT | FTA | Pct | Tot | Avg | A | Stl | Blk | Tov |
|---|---|---|---|---|---|---|---|---|---|---|---|---|---|---|---|---|---|---|
| Allen, Chris | 38 | 319 | 8.4 | 104 | 288 | .361 | 52 | 167 | .311 | 59 | 75 | .787 | 85 | 2.2 | 48 | 14 | 0 | 50 |
| Crandell, Jon | 10 | 4 | 0.4 | 1 | 1 | 1.000 | 0 | 0 | | 2 | 2 | 1.000 | 0 | 0.0 | 0 | 0 | 0 | 0 |
| Dahlman, Isaiah | 16 | 12 | 0.8 | 5 | 9 | .556 | 1 | 3 | .333 | 1 | 4 | .250 | 10 | 0.6 | 0 | 0 | 0 | 0 |
| Gray, Marquise | 38 | 119 | 3.1 | 45 | 78 | .577 | 0 | 0 | | 29 | 43 | .674 | 108 | 2.8 | 12 | 4 | 12 | 35 |
| Green, Draymond | 37 | 122 | 3.3 | 45 | 81 | .556 | 0 | 1 | .000 | 32 | 52 | .615 | 122 | 3.3 | 31 | 21 | 9 | 24 |
| Herzog, Tom | 16 | 10 | 0.6 | 3 | 5 | .600 | 0 | 0 | | 4 | 7 | .571 | 11 | 0.7 | 1 | 0 | 5 | 0 |
| Ibok, Idong | 28 | 10 | 0.4 | 3 | 8 | .375 | 0 | 0 | | 4 | 6 | .667 | 25 | 0.9 | 5 | 0 | 7 | 13 |
| Kebler, Mike | 8 | 4 | 0.5 | 1 | 2 | .500 | 0 | 1 | .000 | 2 | 2 | 1.000 | 2 | 0.3 | 1 | 0 | 0 | 0 |
| Lucas, Kalin | 38 | 559 | 14.7 | 173 | 438 | .395 | 41 | 105 | .390 | 172 | 213 | .671 | 80 | 2.1 | 176 | 39 | 6 | 84 |
| Lucious, Korie | 38 | 121 | 3.2 | 40 | 106 | .377 | 29 | 82 | .354 | 12 | 18 | .664 | 32 | 0.8 | 47 | 10 | 2 | 42 |
| Morgan, Raymar | 35 | 358 | 10.2 | 132 | 254 | .526 | 5 | 21 | .238 | 89 | 135 | .659 | 184 | 5.3 | 41 | 23 | 7 | 62 |
| Roe, Delvon | 38 | 213 | 5.6 | 81 | 143 | .566 | 0 | 0 | | 21 | 112 | .455 | 197 | 5.2 | 35 | 16 | 29 | 42 |
| Summers, Durrell | 38 | 326 | 8.6 | 116 | 267 | .551 | 45 | 117 | .385 | 49 | 68 | .721 | 129 | 3.4 | 30 | 25 | 13 | 55 |
| Suton, Goran | 32 | 334 | 10.4 | 123 | 234 | .521 | 21 | 48 | .438 | 67 | 79 | .848 | 269 | 8.4 | 50 | 36 | 16 | 58 |
| Thornton, Austin | 27 | 33 | 1.2 | 9 | 25 | .360 | 4 | 17 | .235 | 11 | 14 | .786 | 21 | 0.8 | 7 | 4 | 0 | 6 |
| Walton, Travis | 38 | 193 | 5.1 | 81 | 197 | .411 | 3 | 5 | .600 | 28 | 47 | .596 | 85 | 2.2 | 127 | 56 | 1 | 52 |

Legend
| GP | Games played | Avg | Average per game |
| FG | Field-goals made | FGA | Field-goal attempts | Tov | Turnovers |
| Blk | Blocks | Stl | Steals | A | Assists |

== Rankings ==
Ranking movements Legend: ██ Increase in ranking ██ Decrease in ranking
| | Week | | | | | | | | | | | | | | | | | | | |
| Poll | Pre | 1 | 2 | 3 | 4 | 5 | 6 | 7 | 8 | 9 | 10 | 11 | 12 | 13 | 14 | 15 | 16 | 17 | 18 | Final |
|---|---|---|---|---|---|---|---|---|---|---|---|---|---|---|---|---|---|---|---|---|
| AP | 6 | 5 | 5 | 13 | 18 | 19 | 11 | 10 | 8 | 7 | 7 | 9 | 13 | 9 | 6 | 9 | 8 | 7 | 8 | Not released |
| Coaches | 7 | 7 | 6 | 12 | 20 | 22 | 18 | 15 | 12 | 10 | 7 | 9 | 14 | 9 | 5 | 9 | 8 | 6 | 7 | 2 |

*AP does not release post-NCAA tournament rankings

== Awards and honors ==
- Kalin Lucas – Big Ten Player of the Year
- Kalin Lucas – NABC All District First Team
- Kalin Lucas – USBWA All-District Team
- Kalin Lucas – AP All-American honorable mention
- Tom Izzo – Big Ten Coach of the Year (Coaches)
- Travis Walton – Big Ten Defensive Player of the Year
- Goran Suton – All Big Ten Second Team
- Goran Suton – NABC All District Second Team
- Raymar Morgan – All Big Ten Honorable Mention
- Delvon Roe – Big Ten All-Freshman Team
