= Travis Walton =

Travis Walton may refer to:

- Travis Walton (basketball) (born 1987), American professional basketball player and coach
- Travis Walton incident, 1975 incident in which an American logger claimed to have been abducted by a UFO
