= 2009 Northeast Conference men's basketball tournament =

- Classification: Division I
- Season: 2008–09
- Teams: 8
- Site: campus sites
- Finals site: Charles L. Sewall Center; Moon Township, Pennsylvania
- Champions: Robert Morris (6th title)
- Winning coach: Mike Rice (1st title)
- MVP: Jeremy Chappell (Robert Morris)

2008–09 Northeast Conference men's basketball standings
	Conf.				Overall
Team	W		L	PCT	W		L	PCT
Robert Morris †	15	–	3	.833	24	–	11	.686
Mount St. Mary's	12	–	6	.667	19	–	14	.576
Sacred Heart	12	–	6	.667	17	–	14	.548
Long Island	12	–	6	.667	16	–	14	.533
Quinnipiac	10	–	8	.556	15	–	16	.484
Central Connecticut	8	–	10	.444	13	–	17	.433
Wagner	8	–	10	.444	16	–	14	.533
St. Francis (NY)	7	–	11	.389	10	–	20	.333
Monmouth	6	–	12	.333	8	–	23	.258
Fairleigh Dickinson	6	–	12	.333	7	–	23	.233
Saint Francis (PA)	3	–	15	.167	6	–	23	.207
† 2009 NEC tournament winner

The 2009 Northeast Conference men's basketball tournament was held on March 5, 8th, and 11th. The tournament featured the league's top eight seeds. The tourney opened on March 5 with the quarterfinals, followed by the semifinals on March 8 and the finals on March 11. The champion, Robert Morris, earned a trip to the 2009 NCAA Tournament.

== Format ==
The top eight eligible men's basketball teams in the Northeast Conference receive a berth in the conference tournament. After the conference season, teams are seeded by conference record. The semifinals matchups will be the highest and lowest remaining seeds in one game and the other two seeds in the other game. All games are held at the home court of the higher-seeded team.

== Bracket ==
Quarterfinals; March 5
1	Robert Morris	73
8	St. Francis (NY)	60
4	Long Island	78^{OT}
5	Quinnipiac	86
(Pairings are reseeded after the first round)
3	Sacred Heart	76
6	Central Connecticut	64
2	Mount St. Mary's	72
7	Wagner	62

Semifinals; March 8
1	Robert Morris	75
5	Quinnipiac	48
3	Sacred Heart	63
2	Mount St. Mary's	68

Finals; March 11; ESPN2
1	Robert Morris	48
2	Mount St. Mary's	46

== All-tournament team ==
Tournament MVP in bold.

**2009 NEC All-Tournament Team**

**Jeremy Chappell**, RMU
Kelly Beidler, MSM
Joey Henley, SHU
Rob Robinson, RMU
Justin Rutty, QU

== Sources ==
- Tournament Bracket
- Tournament Home Page
