= Jeremy Chappell =

American basketball player (born 1987)

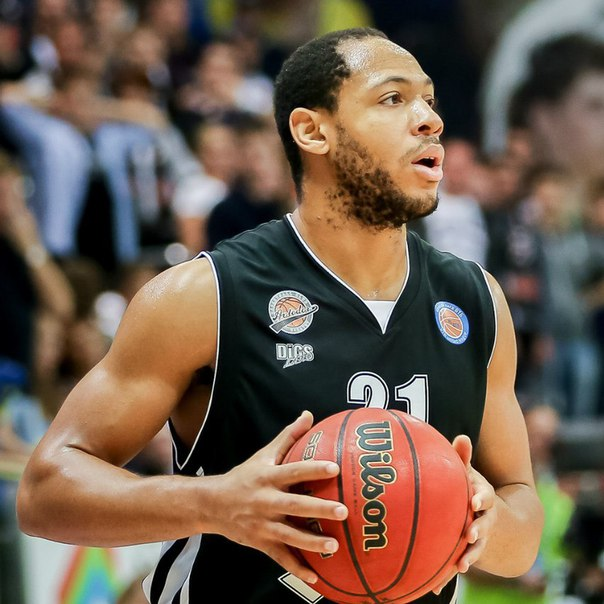
- Chappell playing for Avtodor Saratov in 2016

Free agent
- Position: Shooting guard

Personal information
- Born: June 10, 1987 (age 39) Cincinnati, Ohio, U.S.
- Listed height: 1.91 m (6 ft 3 in)
- Listed weight: 91 kg (201 lb)

Career information
- High school: Northwest (Cincinnati, Ohio)
- College: Robert Morris (2005–2009)
- NBA draft: 2009: undrafted
- Playing career: 2009–present

Career history
- 2009–2010: Znicz Jarosław
- 2010–2011: Goverla
- 2011–2013: Ferro-ZNTU
- 2013–2014: Triumph Lyubertsy
- 2014–2016: Avtodor Saratov
- 2016–2017: Banvit
- 2017–2018: Cantù
- 2018–2019: Brindisi
- 2019–2021: Reyer Venezia
- 2021–2022: Brindisi

Career highlights
- Turkish Cup winner (2017); AP Honorable mention All-American (2009); NEC Player of the Year (2009); First-team All-NEC (2009); NEC tournament MVP (2009)

Jeremy Lamar Chappell (born June 10, 1987) is an American professional basketball player who last played for New Basket Brindisi of the Lega Basket Serie A (LBA) and FIBA Basketball Champions League. He played college basketball at Robert Morris University in Pittsburgh, Pennsylvania.

== College career ==
A 6'3" swingman from Cincinnati, Ohio, Chappell played college basketball at Robert Morris under coaches Mark Schmidt and Mike Rice. A four-year starter for the Colonials, Chappell led the team to a 24–11 overall record and both regular-season and tournament Northeast Conference (NEC) titles. Chappell emerged as one of the brightest stars in the NEC, averaging 16.7 points and 6.3 rebounds per game on the year and was named the Northeast Conference Player of the Year at the close of the season. In the 2009 NEC tournament, Chappell scored 15 points in the final, earning tournament MVP honors and sending Robert Morris to the NCAA tournament for the first time in 17 years.

== Professional career ==
Chappell was not selected in the 2009 NBA draft, instead heading to Poland to play for Znicz Jarosław. He spent the next three seasons playing in Ukraine for Hoverla and Ferro-ZNTU before moving to Russia to play for Triumph Lyubertsy. After averaging 10.8 points and 4.2 points per game in VTB United League play in the 2013–14 season, he signed with Avtodor Saratov for 2014–15.

On August 28, 2018, Chappell signed a deal with Italian club New Basket Brindisi.

On July 22, 2019, he has signed with Reyer Venezia of the Italian Lega Basket Serie A (LBA). Chappell signed a one-year contract extension on June 29, 2020.

After two season with Venezia, on July 12, 2021, Chappel returns to Brindisi signing a 2-years contract.
