= 2008–09 St. Francis Terriers men's basketball team =

American college basketball season

2008–09 St. Francis Terriers men's basketball
- Conference: Northeast Conference
- Record: 10–20 (7–11 NEC)
- Head coach: Brian Nash (4th season)
- Assistant coaches: Clive Bentick (2nd season); Allen Griffin (3rd season); Andy Johnston (1st season)
- Home arena: Generoso Pope Athletic Complex

2008–09 Northeast Conference men's basketball standings
	Conf.				Overall
Team	W		L	PCT	W		L	PCT
Robert Morris †	15	–	3	.833	24	–	11	.686
Mount St. Mary's	12	–	6	.667	19	–	14	.576
Sacred Heart	12	–	6	.667	17	–	14	.548
Long Island	12	–	6	.667	16	–	14	.533
Quinnipiac	10	–	8	.556	15	–	16	.484
Central Connecticut	8	–	10	.444	13	–	17	.433
Wagner	8	–	10	.444	16	–	14	.533
St. Francis (NY)	7	–	11	.389	10	–	20	.333
Monmouth	6	–	12	.333	8	–	23	.258
Fairleigh Dickinson	6	–	12	.333	7	–	23	.233
Saint Francis (PA)	3	–	15	.167	6	–	23	.207
† 2009 NEC tournament winner

The 2008–09 St. Francis Terriers men's basketball team represented St. Francis College during the 2008–09 NCAA Division I men's basketball season. The team was coached by Brian Nash, who was in his fourth year at the helm of the St. Francis Terriers. The Terrier's home games were played at the Generoso Pope Athletic Complex. The team has been a member of the Northeast Conference since 1981.

Nash's team finished at 10–20 overall and 7–11 in conference play for an 8th-place finish.

== Roster ==
2008–09 St. Francis Brooklyn Terriers men's basketball team
Players
Coaches

Pos.	#	Name	Height	Weight	Year	Hometown
G	3	Jamaal Womack (C)	5 ft 8 in (1.73 m)	170 lb (77 kg)	Sr	Bronx, NY
F	44	John Gooden	6 ft 6 in (1.98 m)	220 lb (100 kg)	Sr	Bronx, NY
G	45	Rocco Rubino	6 ft 2 in (1.88 m)	165 lb (75 kg)	So	Brooklyn, NY
G/F	32	Kayode Ayeni	6 ft 5 in (1.96 m)	180 lb (82 kg)	Jr	Brooklyn, NY
F	23	Herman Wrice	6 ft 7 in (2.01 m)	210 lb (95 kg)	Jr	Philadelphia, PA
F	1	Rainier Rickards	6 ft 5 in (1.96 m)	195 lb (88 kg)	Jr	Queens, NY
F	21	Nigel Byam	6 ft 7 in (2.01 m)	210 lb (95 kg)	Jr	Brooklyn, NY
F	50	Nigel Lee	6 ft 7 in (2.01 m)	260 lb (118 kg)	Jr	Glenndale, MD
G	11	Ricky Cadell	6 ft 2 in (1.88 m)	180 lb (82 kg)	So	Bronx, NY
G/F	2	Stefan Perunicic	6 ft 6 in (1.98 m)	195 lb (88 kg)	Fr	Belgrade, Serbia
G	15	Justin Newton	6 ft 0 in (1.83 m)	190 lb (86 kg)	Fr	Brooklyn, NY
C	20	Richard Clark	6 ft 9 in (2.06 m)	215 lb (98 kg)	Fr	Berkshire, England
G	5	Tom Ward	6 ft 4 in (1.93 m)	185 lb (84 kg)	Fr	Brighton, England

Head coach

- Brian Nash (Keene State '92)

Assistant coach(es)

- Clive Bentick (Canisius '01)
- Andy Johnston (New Hampshire)
- Allen Griffin (Syracuse '01)

Legend

- (C) Team captain
- (S) Suspended
- (I) Ineligible
- (W) Walk-on
- Injured
- Current redshirt

== Schedule and results ==
Date time, TV	Opponent	Result	Record	Site (attendance) city, state
Regular season
November 14, 2008*; 8:00 pm	at Seton Hall	L 61–88	0–1	Prudential Center (4,312); Newark, NJ
November 18, 2008*; 7:00 pm	at Navy	L 63–75	0–2	Alumni Hall (1,005); Annapolis, MD
November 22, 2008*; 2:00 pm	at Hartford	L 82–91	0–3	Chase Arena at Reich Family Pavilion (1,185); Hartford, CT
November 26, 2008*; 7:30 pm	Manhattan	W 70–68	1–3	Generoso Pope Athletic Complex (673); Brooklyn, NY
December 1, 2008*; 7:30 pm	at St. John's (NY)	L 61–69	1–4	Carnesecca Arena (2,960); Queens, NY
December 4, 2008; 7:00 pm	at Robert Morris	W 87–79	2–4 (1–0)	Charles L. Sewall Center (658); Moon Township, PA
December 6, 2008; 12:00 pm	at Saint Francis (PA)	L 65–69	2–5 (1–1)	DeGol Arena; Loretto, PA
December 9, 2008*; 7:00 pm	Columbia	W 59–57	3–5	Generoso Pope Athletic Complex (493); Brooklyn, NY
December 13, 2008*; 4:00 pm	at Hofstra	L 52–68	3–6	Mack Sports Complex (3,030); Hempstead, NY
December 22, 2008*; 7:00 pm	Albany	L 59–68	3–7	Generoso Pope Athletic Complex (407); Brooklyn, NY
December 28, 2008*; 7:00 pm	at Akron	L 70–77	3–8	James A. Rhodes Arena (2,663); Akron, OH
December 30, 2008*; 7:00 pm	at Ohio	L 53–70	3–9	Convocation Center (2,928); Athens, OH
January 3, 2009; 7:00 pm	at Wagner	L 78–80	3–10 (1–2)	Spiro Sports Center (1,205); Staten Island, NY
January 8, 2009; 7:00 pm	Monmouth	W 73–62	4–10 (2–2)	Generoso Pope Athletic Complex (289); Brooklyn, NY
January 10, 2009; 4:30 pm	Mount St. Mary's	L 62–74	4–11 (2–3)	Generoso Pope Athletic Complex (305); Brooklyn, NY
January 15, 2009; 7:00 pm	Quinnipiac	L 44–70	4–12 (2–4)	Generoso Pope Athletic Complex (227); Brooklyn, NY
January 19, 2009; 8:00 pm	at Long Island	L 70–74	4–13 (2–5)	Wellness, Recreation & Athletics Center (984); Brooklyn, NY
January 22, 2009; 7:00 pm	Wagner	W 65–62	5–13 (3–5)	Generoso Pope Athletic Complex (307); Brooklyn, NY
January 24, 2009; 4:00 pm	Saint Francis (PA)	W 58–57	6–13 (4–5)	Generoso Pope Athletic Complex (702); Brooklyn, NY
January 29, 2009; 7:00 pm	at Sacred Heart	L 51–71	6–14 (4–6)	William H. Pitt Center (609); Fairfield, CT
January 31, 2009; 7:00 pm	at Fairleigh Dickinson	W 73–62	7–14 (5–6)	Rothman Center (658); Hackensack, NJ
February 5, 2009; 7:00 pm	Robert Morris	L 54–61	7–15 (5–7)	Generoso Pope Athletic Complex (507); Brooklyn, NY
February 7, 2009; 7:00 pm	at Monmouth	W 82–77	8–15 (6–7)	William T. Boylan Gymnasium (1,692); West Long Branch, NJ
February 12, 2009; 7:00 pm	at Mount St. Mary's	L 57–68	8–16 (6–8)	Knott Arena (1,136); Emmitsburg, MD
February 14, 2009; 4:30 pm	Fairleigh Dickinson	W 82–72	9–16 (7–8)	Generoso Pope Athletic Complex (683); Brooklyn, NY
February 19, 2009*; 7:00 pm	at Bryant	W 82–66	10–16	Chace Athletic Center (971); Smithfield, RI
February 21, 2009; 2:00 pm	at Central Connecticut State	L 73–78	10–17 (7–9)	William H. Detrick Gymnasium (2,106); New Britain, CT
February 26, 2009; 7:00 pm	Sacred Heart	L 73–76	10–18 (7–10)	Generoso Pope Athletic Complex (407); Brooklyn, NY
February 28, 2009; 4:30 pm	Long Island; Battle of Brooklyn	L 54–66	10–19 (7–11)	Generoso Pope Athletic Complex (726); Brooklyn, NY
2009 NEC tournament
March 5, 2009; 7:00 pm	at Robert Morris; Quarterfinals	L 60–73	10–20	Charles L. Sewall Center (1,173); Moon Township, PA
*Non-conference game. ^{#}Rankings from AP Poll. (#) Tournament seedings in parentheses.
