= Jeremy Fears Jr. =

American basketball player (born 2005)

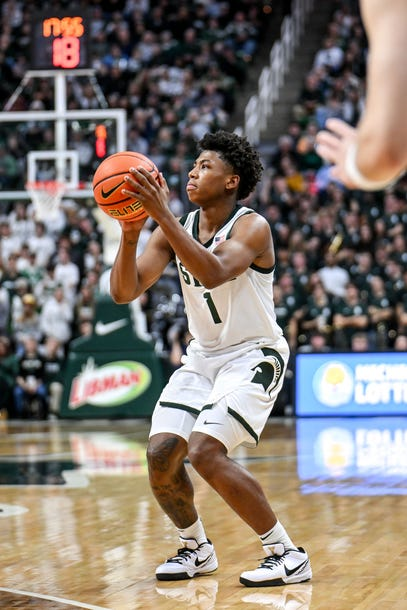
- Jeremy Fears, Jr. in 2024.

No. 1 – Michigan State Spartans
- Position: Point guard
- League: Big Ten Conference

Personal information
- Born: April 19, 2005 (age 21) Chicago, Illinois, U.S.
- Listed height: 6 ft 2 in (1.88 m)
- Listed weight: 190 lb (86 kg)

Career information
- High school: Joliet West (Joliet, Illinois); La Lumiere School (La Porte, Indiana)
- College: Michigan State (2023–present)

Career highlights
- Second-team All-American – AP (2026); Third-team All-American – NABC, TSN, USBWA (2026); First-team All-Big Ten (2026); NCAA assists leader (2026); McDonald's All-American (2023); Jordan Brand Classic (2023)
Medals
Men's basketball
Representing United States
FIBA Under-17 Basketball World Cup
| Gold medal – first place | 2022 Spain | Team |
FIBA Americas Under-16 Championship
| Gold medal – first place | 2021 Mexico | Team |

Jeremy Vann Fears Jr. (born April 19, 2005) is an American college basketball player for the Michigan State Spartans of the Big Ten Conference. He was a consensus four-star recruit and one of the top players in the 2023 class.

== Early life and high school career ==
Fears grew up in Joliet, Illinois and initially attended Joliet West High School. He transferred to the La Lumiere School in La Porte, Indiana after his freshman year. Prior to the start of his senior year, Fears transferred back to Joliet West. He averaged 18.8 points, 5.6 rebounds, and 5.3 assists per game and was named the Illinois Gatorade Player of the Year.

=== Recruiting ===
Fears was a consensus four-star recruit and one of the top players in the 2023 class, according to major recruiting services. On January 6, 2022, he committed to playing college basketball for Michigan State after also considering an offer from Illinois.

College recruiting
| Name | Hometown | School | Height | Weight | Commit date |
|---|---|---|---|---|---|
| Jeremy Fears Jr. PG | Joliet, IL | Joliet West (IL) | 6 ft 2 in (1.88 m) | 180 lb (82 kg) | Jan 6, 2022 |
| Jeremy Fears Jr. PG | Recruit ratings: Rivals: 247Sports: ESPN: (88) | | | | |
Overall recruit ranking: Rivals: 38 247Sports: 32 ESPN: 27
Note: In many cases, Scout, Rivals, 247Sports, On3, and ESPN may conflict in their listings of height and weight.; In these cases, the average was taken. ESPN grades are on a 100-point scale.; Sources: "Michigan 2023 Basketball Commitments". Rivals.; "2023 Michigan State Spartans Recruiting Class". ESPN.; "2023 Team Ranking". Rivals.

== College career ==
Fears enrolled at Michigan State University in June 2023 in order to take part in summer practices. He averaged 3.5 points and 3.3 assists per game as a freshman.

== National team career ==
Fears played for the United States national under-16 team at the 2021 FIBA Under-16 Americas Championship. The following summer, he played for the United States under-17 basketball team at the 2022 FIBA Under-17 Basketball World Cup.

== Career statistics ==
Legend
| GP | Games played | GS | Games started | MPG | Minutes per game |
| FG% | Field goal percentage | 3P% | 3-point field goal percentage | FT% | Free throw percentage |
| RPG | Rebounds per game | APG | Assists per game | SPG | Steals per game |
| BPG | Blocks per game | PPG | Points per game | **Bold** | Career high |
| * | Led the league |

=== College ===
| Year | Team | GP | GS | MPG | FG% | 3P% | FT% | RPG | APG | SPG | BPG | PPG |
|---|---|---|---|---|---|---|---|---|---|---|---|---|
| 2023–24 | Michigan State | 12 | 0 | 15.3 | **.500** | .167 | .647 | 1.9 | 3.3 | .8 | **.2** | 3.5 |
| 2024–25 | Michigan State | **36** | **36** | 23.7 | .397 | **.342** | .730 | 2.1 | 5.4 | 1.1 | **.2** | 7.2 |
| 2025–26 | Michigan State | 35 | 35 | **32.4** | .431 | .321 | **.885** | **2.4** | **9.4*** | **1.3** | .0 | **15.2** |
| Career | | 83 | 71 | 26.2 | .424 | .320 | .814 | 2.2 | 6.8 | 1.1 | .1 | 10.0 |

== Personal life ==
Fears' father, Jeremy Fears Sr., played college basketball at Ohio University and Bradley.

During Fears' freshman season, AJ Hoggard and Tyson Walker were the starting guards for the 2023–24 Michigan State Spartans men's basketball team. Fears backed up Hoggard at point guard. On December 21, 2023, Fears posted a career-high 10 assists in a 99–55 win against Stony Brook. On December 23, Fears was shot while on holiday break in his hometown and endured a three-hour surgery to remove the bullet from his left thigh. He returned for Michigan State’s 2024 season opener on November 4. He posted his first double-double on January 9, 2025 against Washington with 12 points and 10 assists.

Fears’ younger brother Jeremiah Fears is a guard for the New Orleans Pelicans.

== See also ==
- Michigan State Spartans men's basketball statistical leaders
- List of NCAA Division I men's basketball season assists leaders
