= Tom Izzo =

American basketball player and coach (born 1955)

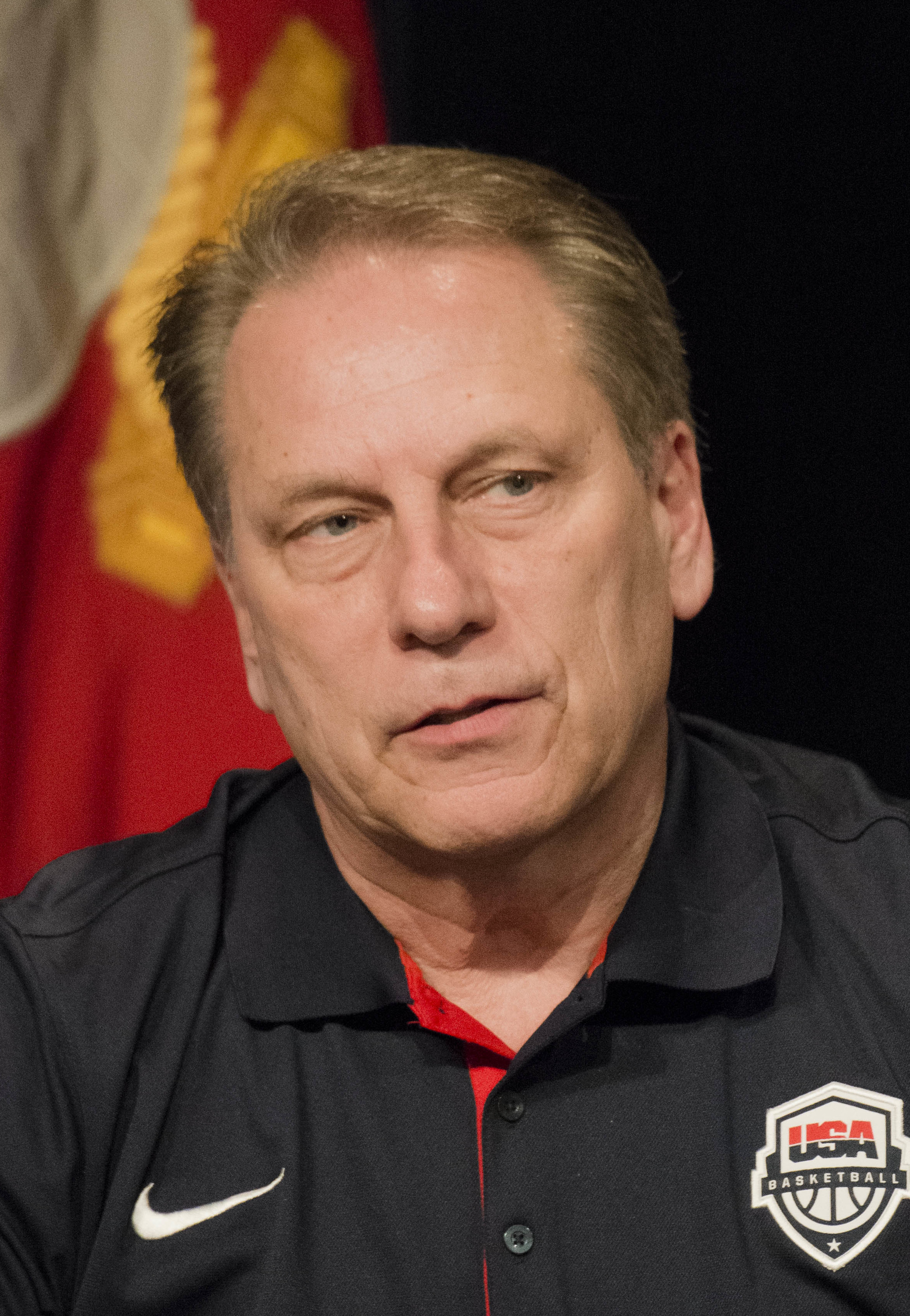
- Izzo in 2014

Current position
- Title: Head coach
- Team: Michigan State
- Conference: Big Ten
- Record: 768–309 (.713)
- Annual salary: $6,200,000

Biographical details
- Born: January 30, 1955 (age 71); Iron Mountain, Michigan, U.S.

Playing career
- 1973–1977: Northern Michigan

Coaching career (HC unless noted)
- 1977–1979: Ishpeming HS
- 1979–1983: Northern Michigan (assistant)
- 1983–1995: Michigan State (assistant)
- 1995–present: Michigan State

Head coaching record
- Overall: 768–309 (.713) (college)
- Tournaments: 61–27 (NCAA Division I); 2–2 (NIT)

Accomplishments and honors

Championships
- NCAA Division I tournament (2000); 8 NCAA Division I regional – Final Four (1999, 2000, 2001, 2005, 2009, 2010, 2015, 2019); 6 Big Ten tournament (1999, 2000, 2012, 2014, 2016, 2019); 11 Big Ten regular season (1998–2001, 2009, 2010, 2012, 2018–2020, 2025)

Awards
- 2× NABC Coach of the Year (2001, 2012); Clair Bee Coach of the Year Award (2005); AP College Coach of the Year (1998); Henry Iba Award (1998); 4× Big Ten Coach of the Year (1998, 2009, 2012, 2025); John R. Wooden Legends of Coaching Award (2011)
- Basketball Hall of Fame; Inducted in 2016 (profile)

Thomas Michael Izzo (/ˈɪzoʊ/, Italian pronunciation: [ˈittso]; born January 30, 1955) is an American college basketball coach who has been the head coach at Michigan State University since 1995. On April 4, 2016, Izzo was elected to the Naismith Basketball Hall of Fame.

Izzo has led the Spartans to eight Final Fours in the NCAA Tournament, which include the NCAA National Championship in 2000 and a Runner-Up finish in 2009. His teams have won 11 Big Ten regular season titles and six Big Ten tournament titles in his 31 years at Michigan State. Izzo has the most wins in school history and has appeared in 28 consecutive NCAA tournaments, the longest streak of tournament appearances ever by a coach at one school. He has never had a losing season as a head coach. In addition, MSU set the Big Ten record for the longest home court winning streak between 1998 and 2002. Several of these accomplishments led former ESPN analyst Andy Katz to deem Michigan State the top college basketball program for the decade of 1998 to 2007.

Izzo is the longest-tenured coach in the Big Ten Conference and his teams are often recognized for their rebounding prowess and defensive tenacity. He has won four national coach of the year awards and maintains a considerable coaching tree—several of his former assistants are head coaches at other Division I schools. Izzo has won 11 regular-season conference titles, tied with Ward Lambert and Bob Knight for the most in conference history. He has also won the most Big Ten tourney titles (six) in conference history.

On March 8, 2022, Izzo surpassed Bob Knight for the most wins by a men's basketball coach at a Big Ten school with 663. On January 30, 2024, Izzo earned his 700th career win. On February 15, 2025, Izzo again passed Knight, this time for the most Big Ten conference wins in history with 354. On January 5, 2026, Izzo earned his 750th career victory.

== Biography ==
=== Playing career ===
Izzo, who is of Italian and Finnish descent, was born and raised in Iron Mountain in the Upper Peninsula of Michigan, near the border of Wisconsin. In his hometown he met best friend and former NFL head coach Steve Mariucci. Both he and Mariucci attended Iron Mountain High where they were teammates on the football, basketball and track teams. At Northern Michigan University in Marquette, where they were roommates, Izzo played guard for the men's basketball team from 1973 to 1977. In his senior season, he set a school record for minutes played and was named a Division II All-American.

=== Early coaching career ===
After graduating from Northern Michigan, Izzo was head coach at Ishpeming High School for one season. He then took an assistant coaching job at Northern Michigan University from 1979 to 1983. Izzo was then named a part-time assistant at Michigan State in September 1983. After a short two-month stay in 1986 as an assistant coach at University of Tulsa, Izzo returned to Michigan State when assistant Mike Deane left to become head coach at Siena College. Prior to the 1990–91 season, then-coach Jud Heathcote elevated Izzo to associate head coach. After Heathcote's retirement following the 1994–95 season and upon both Heathcote and the Michigan State Athletic Director's recommendation, Izzo was named the new head coach of men's basketball for MSU.

=== Head coach at Michigan State ===
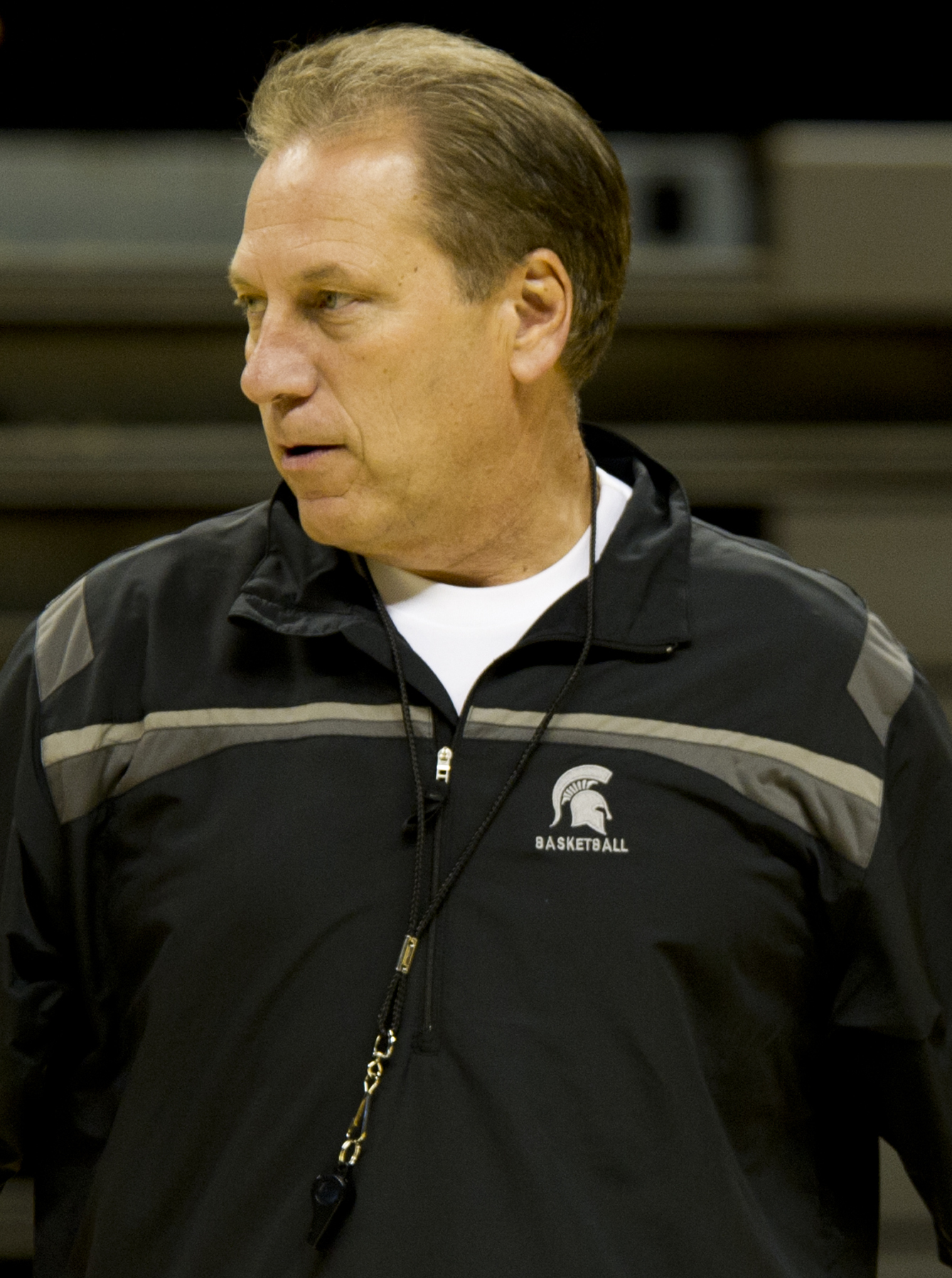
Izzo in 2011

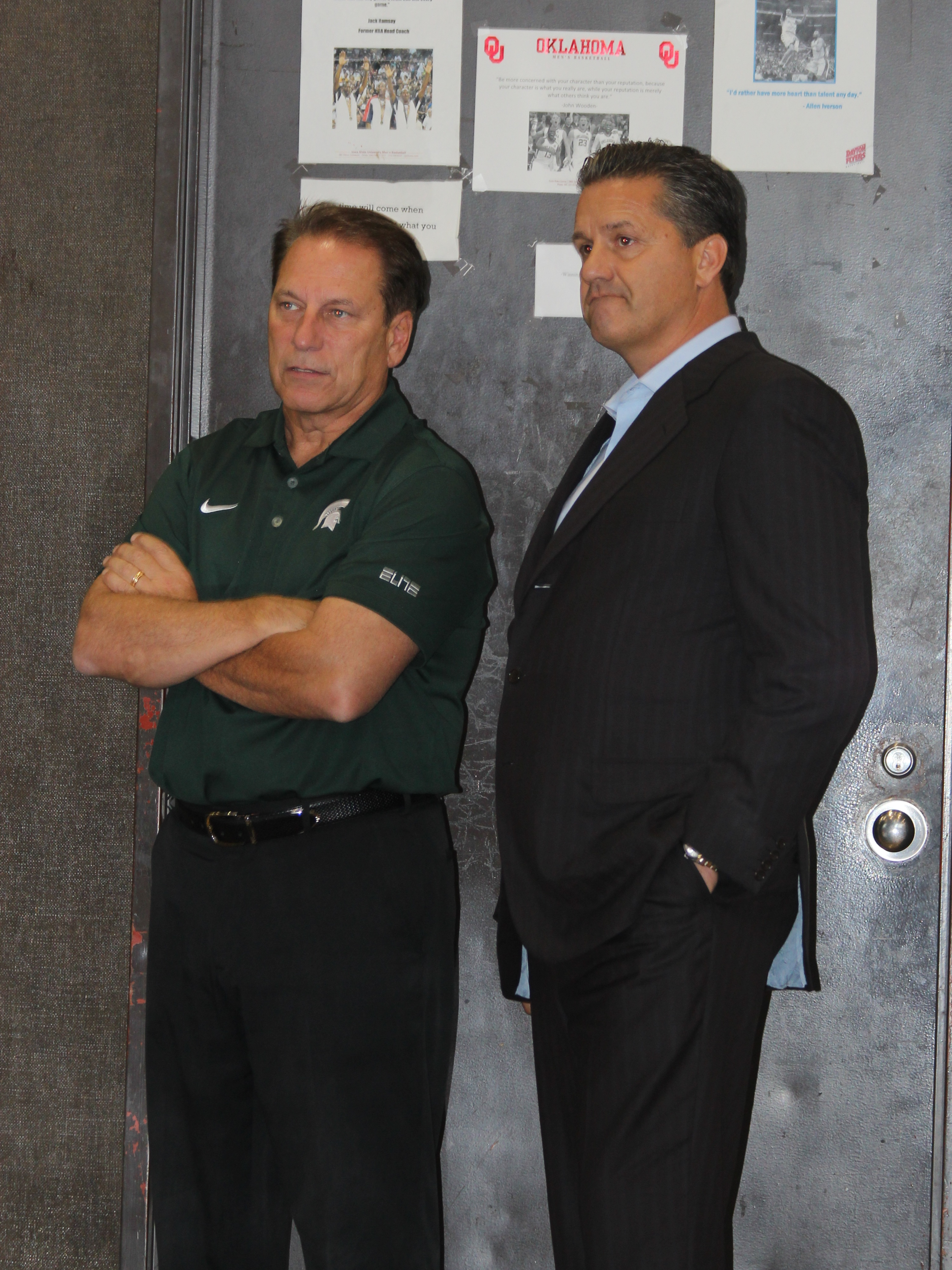
Izzo and John Calipari of Kentucky, the two highest paid college coaches in 2012

Hired as head coach at Michigan State in 1995, Izzo is currently the longest-tenured basketball coach in the Big Ten Conference. He became the coach with the most wins in school history after winning his 341st game on November 29, 2009, to surpass Heathcote. In his first two seasons as head coach, Izzo went 9–9 in conference play, finishing sixth and seventh in the conference and failed to make the NCAA tournament. In 1998, MSU's record in conference improved to 13–3 and Izzo won the first of his 11 regular-season Big Ten championships. 1998 also saw Michigan State begin a streak of 27 straight NCAA tournament appearances, which is the second longest current streak among Division I teams. Izzo has a record of 54–23 in the NCAA tournament. In 1999, Izzo won his first of six Big Ten tournament titles, and went to his first Final Four, the first of three straight Final Four appearances, joining Krzyzewski and Ben Howland as the only three coaches who have made three consecutive Final Fours since the NCAA tournament bracket expanded to 64 teams in 1985. In the instate rivalry with Michigan, Izzo's official record against the Wolverines is 36-16, although Michigan vacated five of their wins in the series at the start of his head coaching career.

In 2000, Izzo led MSU to its second NCAA national championship with an 89–76 win over Florida. Eighty-two percent of his players who completed their eligibility left MSU with a degree. Over the years, Izzo has been pursued by the Atlanta Hawks, Chicago Bulls, Cleveland Cavaliers, and New Jersey Nets for head coaching jobs. After a brief flirtation with Cleveland, on June 15, 2010, Izzo reported to the Michigan State University's board of trustees that he would remain head coach of Michigan State, in which he stated he was "a Spartan for life."

Izzo fell short of obtaining his second national championship in 2009 with a loss to North Carolina 89–72 in Detroit. His streak of three straight Final Four appearances from 1999 to 2001 is the third-longest of all time, and his six Final Four appearances in the years 1999–2010 were matched by no other team in college basketball.

In 2013, Izzo was voted as the fifth angriest coach in college basketball by USA Today Sports, an honor that he cherishes.

On November 26, 2015, Izzo won his 500th career game, all with Michigan State, with a win over Boston College in the Wooden Legacy. On January 28, 2016, Izzo won his 513th career game moving him into second place past Gene Keady all time for wins by a coach in the Big Ten, at the time trailing only Bob Knight.

On March 18, 2016, MSU suffered what was, at the time, perhaps the single greatest upset in NCAA Tournament history when No. 15-seeded Middle Tennessee defeated the No. 2-seeded Spartans 90–81. It was believed that MSU was the equivalent of a No. 1 seed and Vegas odds had them pegged the favorite to win the title. Middle Tennessee led from start to finish and held off repeated Michigan State threats to take the lead. Despite that, Izzo stated that the team "resurrected me".

On October 13, 2016, Izzo won the Dean Smith Award which is awarded to "an individual in college basketball who embodies the spirit and values of the late North Carolina coaching great".

Izzo led the 2018–19 Spartans to a 32–7 overall record, his fifth 30-win season, and 19th season with 20+ wins, nearly triple his predecessor's seven 20-win campaigns; the team reached the Final Four for the eighth time under Izzo. On October 21, 2019, at the outset of Izzo's 25th season leading the Spartans, Michigan State was named the preseason No. 1 team in The Associated Press Top 25 men's college basketball preseason poll for the first time in program history, dating to the beginning of the AP poll in 1948.

On February 26, 2022, with a win over the No. 4-ranked Purdue, Izzo tied former Indiana coach Bob Knight for the most wins all-time at a Big Ten school. On March 8, 2022, he passed Knight for the most wins. On January 30, 2024, also his 69th birthday, he earned his 700th career win.

On August 11, 2022, Izzo signed a five-year contract extension, worth $6.2 million annually, with the Spartans. The contract solidifies that Izzo will be a "Spartan for life".

On October 13, 2024, Izzo brought the Spartans to his alma mater for an exhibition game against Northern Michigan for a 70–53 win over the Wildcats. During the game, Izzo was honored by NMU with his number 10 jersey being officially retired by the school.

=== Hall of Fame ===
On April 4, 2016, Izzo was named to the Naismith Memorial Basketball Hall of Fame. Izzo chose former Maryland head coach Gary Williams to introduce him at the Hall of Fame ceremony. He was inducted into the Hall of Fame on September 9, 2016.

In the Fall of 2016, Izzo was named to the Basketball Coaches Association of Michigan (BCAM) Hall of Fame.

=== Coaching philosophy ===
"We'll play anybody, anyplace, anytime. It doesn't matter, morning, noon or night, and it doesn't matter who it is."

— Tom Izzo

Izzo's teams are known for strong guard play, toughness and rebounding. Izzo is famed for his "war" rebounding drill, in which the players wear football helmets and shoulder pads. His motto is "Players Play – Tough Players Win". His other coaching philosophies include, "he doesn't determine playing time, players do", "A player-coached team is better than a coach-coached team" and "Typically, it's on the players." Izzo is also known for scheduling extremely tough non-conference schedules as preparation for the NCAA Tournament in March.

== Coaching tree ==
One of Izzo's former assistants are currently head coaches at other schools:

- Mark Montgomery – Detroit Mercy (formerly coach at Northern Illinois)

One of Izzo's former assistants was a head coach in the NBA:

- Jim Boylen – Chicago Bulls and Utah (college)

Several former Izzo assistants were college head coaches:

- Tom Crean – Georgia, Indiana, and Marquette
- Stan Heath – Eastern Michigan, Kent State, Arkansas, and South Florida
- Dane Fife – IPFW
- Mike Garland – Cleveland State
- Brian Gregory – South Florida, Georgia Tech and Dayton
- Stan Joplin – Toledo
- Dwayne Stephens – Western Michigan

Current Izzo assistants who were previously college head coaches:

- Doug Wojcik – Tulsa and Charleston

== Other basketball endeavors ==
=== USA basketball ===
Izzo was head coach of the USA Basketball men's team that took fourth place at the 2003 Pan American Games. Prior to that, he was assistant coach of the team that had a 5–0 record and won the gold medal at the 2001 Goodwill Games. Izzo served on the Collegiate Committee of USA Basketball's 2005–2008 Quadrennium Committees.

=== Operation Hardwood ===
In 2005 and 2006, Izzo participated in Operation Hardwood, in which college coaches went to Kuwait military camps to coach basketball teams of American service members. Among the other coaches were Tubby Smith, Gary Williams, and Rick Barnes. In 2005, Izzo's team won the tournament championship.

== Marriage and family ==
Tom Izzo has been married to his wife, Lupe Marinez Izzo, since 1992. They have a daughter, an adopted son, Steven, who played under Izzo from 2019–24 at Michigan State, and two granddaughters.

== Head coaching record ==
Record table
Season	Team	Overall	Conference	Standing	Postseason
Michigan State Spartans (Big Ten Conference) (1995–present)
1995–96	Michigan State	16–16	9–9	7th	NIT second round
1996–97	Michigan State	17–12	9–9	T–6th	NIT second round
1997–98	Michigan State	22–8	13–3	T–1st	NCAA Division I Sweet 16
1998–99	Michigan State	33–5	15–1	1st	NCAA Division I Final Four
1999–00	Michigan State	32–7	13–3	T–1st	NCAA Division I Champion
2000–01	Michigan State	28–5	13–3	T–1st	NCAA Division I Final Four
2001–02	Michigan State	19–12	10–6	5th	NCAA Division I Round of 64
2002–03	Michigan State	22–13	10–6	T–3rd	NCAA Division I Elite Eight
2003–04	Michigan State	18–12	12–4	T–2nd	NCAA Division I Round of 64
2004–05	Michigan State	26–7	13–3	2nd	NCAA Division I Final Four
2005–06	Michigan State	22–12	8–8	T–6th	NCAA Division I Round of 64
2006–07	Michigan State	23–12	8–8	T–7th	NCAA Division I Round of 32
2007–08	Michigan State	27–9	12–6	4th	NCAA Division I Sweet 16
2008–09	Michigan State	31–7	15–3	1st	NCAA Division I Runner-Up
2009–10	Michigan State	28–9	14–4	T–1st	NCAA Division I Final Four
2010–11	Michigan State	19–15	9–9	T–4th	NCAA Division I Round of 64
2011–12	Michigan State	29–8	13–5	T–1st	NCAA Division I Sweet 16
2012–13	Michigan State	27–9	13–5	T–2nd	NCAA Division I Sweet 16
2013–14	Michigan State	29–9	12–6	T–2nd	NCAA Division I Elite Eight
2014–15	Michigan State	27–12	12–6	T–3rd	NCAA Division I Final Four
2015–16	Michigan State	29–6	13–5	2nd	NCAA Division I Round of 64
2016–17	Michigan State	20–15	10–8	T–5th	NCAA Division I Round of 32
2017–18	Michigan State	30–5	16–2	1st	NCAA Division I Round of 32
2018–19	Michigan State	32–7	16–4	T–1st	NCAA Division I Final Four
2019–20	Michigan State	22–9	14–6	T–1st	Postseason cancelled
2020–21	Michigan State	15–13	9–11	T–8th	NCAA Division I First Four
2021–22	Michigan State	23–13	11–9	T–7th	NCAA Division I Round of 32
2022–23	Michigan State	21–13	11–8	4th	NCAA Division I Sweet 16
2023–24	Michigan State	20–15	10–10	T–6th	NCAA Division I Round of 32
2024–25	Michigan State	30–7	17–3	1st	NCAA Division I Elite Eight
2025–26	Michigan State	27–8	15–5	T–2nd	NCAA Division I Sweet 16
2026–27	Michigan State	4–0	0–0		
Michigan State:		768–309 (.713)	375–177 (.679)		
Total:		768–309 (.713)			
National champion Postseason invitational champion Conference regular season champion Conference regular season and conference tournament champion Division regular season champion Division regular season and conference tournament champion Conference tournament champion

Current through November 13, 2026

== See also ==
- List of NCAA Division I Men's Final Four appearances by coach
- NCAA Division I men's basketball tournament consecutive appearances
- List of college men's basketball career coaching wins leaders
