= 2008–09 Robert Morris Colonials men's basketball team =

American college basketball season

2008–09 Robert Morris Colonials men's basketball

NEC tournament champions NEC Regular Season Champions

NCAA tournament, first round
- Conference: Northeast Conference
- Record: 24–11 (15–3 NEC)
- Head coach: Mike Rice Jr. (2nd season)
- Assistant coaches: Andrew Toole; Jimmy Martelli; Robby Pridgen
- Home arena: Charles L. Sewall Center

2008–09 Northeast Conference men's basketball standings
	Conf.				Overall
Team	W		L	PCT	W		L	PCT
Robert Morris †	15	–	3	.833	24	–	11	.686
Mount St. Mary's	12	–	6	.667	19	–	14	.576
Sacred Heart	12	–	6	.667	17	–	14	.548
Long Island	12	–	6	.667	16	–	14	.533
Quinnipiac	10	–	8	.556	15	–	16	.484
Central Connecticut	8	–	10	.444	13	–	17	.433
Wagner	8	–	10	.444	16	–	14	.533
St. Francis (NY)	7	–	11	.389	10	–	20	.333
Monmouth	6	–	12	.333	8	–	23	.258
Fairleigh Dickinson	6	–	12	.333	7	–	23	.233
Saint Francis (PA)	3	–	15	.167	6	–	23	.207
† 2009 NEC tournament winner

The 2008–09 Robert Morris Colonials men's basketball team represented Robert Morris University in the 2008–09 NCAA Division I basketball season. Robert Morris was coached by Mike Rice Jr. and played their home games at the Charles L. Sewall Center in Moon Township, Pennsylvania. The Colonials were members of the Northeast Conference. They finished the season 24–11, 15–3 in NEC play. They won the 2009 Northeast Conference men's basketball tournament to earn the conference's automatic bid to the 2009 NCAA Division I men's basketball tournament. They received the No. 15 seed in the Midwest Region and played No. 2 seed Michigan State in the first round, losing by a score of 77–62.

== Roster ==
2008–09 Robert Morris Colonials men's basketball team
Players
Coaches

Pos.	#	Name	Height	Weight	Year	Hometown
F	1	Rob Robinson	6 ft 8 in (2.03 m)	215 lb (98 kg)	Jr	Waldorf, Maryland
G	2	Mezie Nwigwe	6 ft 4 in (1.93 m)	195 lb (88 kg)	Jr	Hyattsville, Maryland
G	5	Bateko Francisco	6 ft 1 in (1.85 m)	185 lb (84 kg)	Jr
G	12	Jimmy Langhurst	5 ft 11 in (1.8 m)	185 lb (84 kg)	Jr	Willard, Ohio
G	21	Jeremy Chappell	6 ft 3 in (1.91 m)	210 lb (95 kg)	Sr	Cincinnati, Ohio

Head coach

- Mike Rice Jr.

Assistant coach(es)

- Andrew Toole
- Jimmy Martelli
- Robby Pridgen

Legend

- (C) Team captain
- (S) Suspended
- (I) Ineligible
- (W) Walk-on
- Injured
- Current redshirt

== Schedule and results ==
Date time, TV	Rank^{#}	Opponent^{#}	Result	Record	Site (attendance) city, state
Regular season
Nov 14, 2008*		at St. Bonaventure	L 62–72	0–1	Reilly Center (4,855); St. Bonaventure, New York
Nov 18, 2008*		Delaware	W 86–75	1–1	Charles L. Sewall Center (638); Moon Township, Pennsylvania
Nov 21, 2008*		at Rutgers	L 55–69	1–2	Louis Brown Athletic Center (4,752); Piscataway, New Jersey
Nov 22, 2008*		Marist	L 55–72	1–3	Charles L. Sewall Center (438); Moon Township, Pennsylvania
Nov 25, 2008*		Youngstown State	W 74–72	2–3	Charles L. Sewall Center (323); Moon Township, Pennsylvania
Nov 29, 2008*		at Iona	W 70–62	3–3	Hynes Athletic Center (1,837); New Rochelle, New York
Dec 4, 2008		St. Francis (NY)	L 79–87	3–4 (0–1)	Charles L. Sewall Center (658); Moon Township, Pennsylvania
Dec 6, 2008*		Long Island	W 81–70	4–4 (1–1)	Charles L. Sewall Center (944); Moon Township, Pennsylvania
Dec 14, 2008*		at Miami (FL)	L 62–70	4–5	BankUnited Center (1,812); Miami, Florida
Dec 17, 2008*		at Lafayette	W 83–70	5–5	Kirby Sports Center (1,011); Easton, Pennsylvania
Dec 20, 2008*		vs. Central Michigan	W 73–60	6–5	Palace of Auburn Hills (856); Auburn Hills, Michigan
Dec 28, 2008*		Duquesne	L 62–88	6–6	Charles L. Sewall Center (1,479); Moon Township, Pennsylvania
Dec 31, 2008*		at No. 22 Xavier	L 57–78	6–7	Cintas Center (9,343); Cincinnati, Ohio
Jan 3, 2009		Saint Francis (PA)	W 78–60	7–7 (2–1)	Charles L. Sewall Center (569); Moon Township, Pennsylvania
Jan 5, 2009		at Mount St. Mary's	W 77–70	8–7 (3–1)	Knott Arena (812); Emmitsburg, Maryland
Jan 8, 2009		at Quinnipiac	W 75–63	9–7 (4–1)	TD Bank Sports Center (1,030); Hamden, Connecticut
Jan 10, 2009		at Sacred Heart	W 72–70 ^{OT}	10–7 (5–1)	William H. Pitt Center (492); Fairfield, Connecticut
Jan 15, 2009		Central Connecticut	W 76–64	11–7 (6–1)	Charles L. Sewall Center (834); Moon Township, Pennsylvania
Jan 17, 2009		Wagner	W 104–56	12–7 (7–1)	Charles L. Sewall Center (1,033); Moon Township, Pennsylvania
Jan 24, 2009		at Fairleigh Dickinson	W 74–40	13–7 (8–1)	Rothman Center (364); Hackensack, New Jersey
Jan 29, 2009*		Bryant	W 72–47	14–7	Charles L. Sewall Center (644); Moon Township, Pennsylvania
Jan 31, 2009		Monmouth	W 75–62	15–7 (9–1)	Charles L. Sewall Center (837); Moon Township, Pennsylvania
Feb 2, 2009*		at No. 6 Pittsburgh	L 72–92	15–8	Petersen Events Center (10,122); Pittsburgh, Pennsylvania
Feb 5, 2009		at St. Francis (NY)	W 61–54	16–8 (10–1)	Pope Physical Education Center (507); Brooklyn, New York
Feb 7, 2009		at Central Connecticut	W 64–44	17–8 (11–1)	Detrick Gymnasium (2,314); New Britain, Connecticut
Feb 12, 2009		Sacred Heart	W 85–79	18–8 (12–1)	Charles L. Sewall Center (1,158); Moon Township, Pennsylvania
Feb 14, 2009		Quinnipiac	W 69–64	19–8 (13–1)	Charles L. Sewall Center (779); Moon Township, Pennsylvania
Feb 19, 2009		at Monmouth	L 57–60	19–9 (13–2)	Boylan Gymnasium (1,106); West Long Branch, New Jersey
Feb 21, 2009		at Wagner	L 59–62	19–10 (13–3)	Spiro Sports Center (1,635); Staten Island, New York
Feb 26, 2009		at Saint Francis (PA)	W 74–62	20–10 (14–3)	DeGol Arena (1,021); Loretto, Pennsylvania
Feb 28, 2009		Mount St. Mary's	W 66–63	21–10 (15–3)	Charles L. Sewall Center (1,344); Moon Township, Pennsylvania
NEC tournament
Mar 5, 2009*		St. Francis (NY); Quarterfinals	W 73–60	22–10	Charles L. Sewall Center (1,173); Moon Township, Pennsylvania
Mar 8, 2009*		Quinnipiac; Semifinals	W 75–48	23–10	Charles L. Sewall Center (1,024); Moon Township, Pennsylvania
Mar 11, 2009*		Mount St. Mary's; Championship Game	W 48–46	24–10	Charles L. Sewall Center (3,227); Moon Township, Pennsylvania
NCAA tournament
Mar 20, 2009*	(15 MW)	vs. (2 MW) No. 8 Michigan State; First Round	L 62–77	24–11	Hubert H. Humphrey Metrodome (12,814); Minneapolis, Minnesota
*Non-conference game. ^{#}Rankings from AP poll. (#) Tournament seedings in parentheses. MW=Midwest. All times are in Eastern.

== Awards and honors ==
- Jeremy Chappell – NEC Player of the Year
