= Korie Lucious =

American professional basketball player (born 1989)

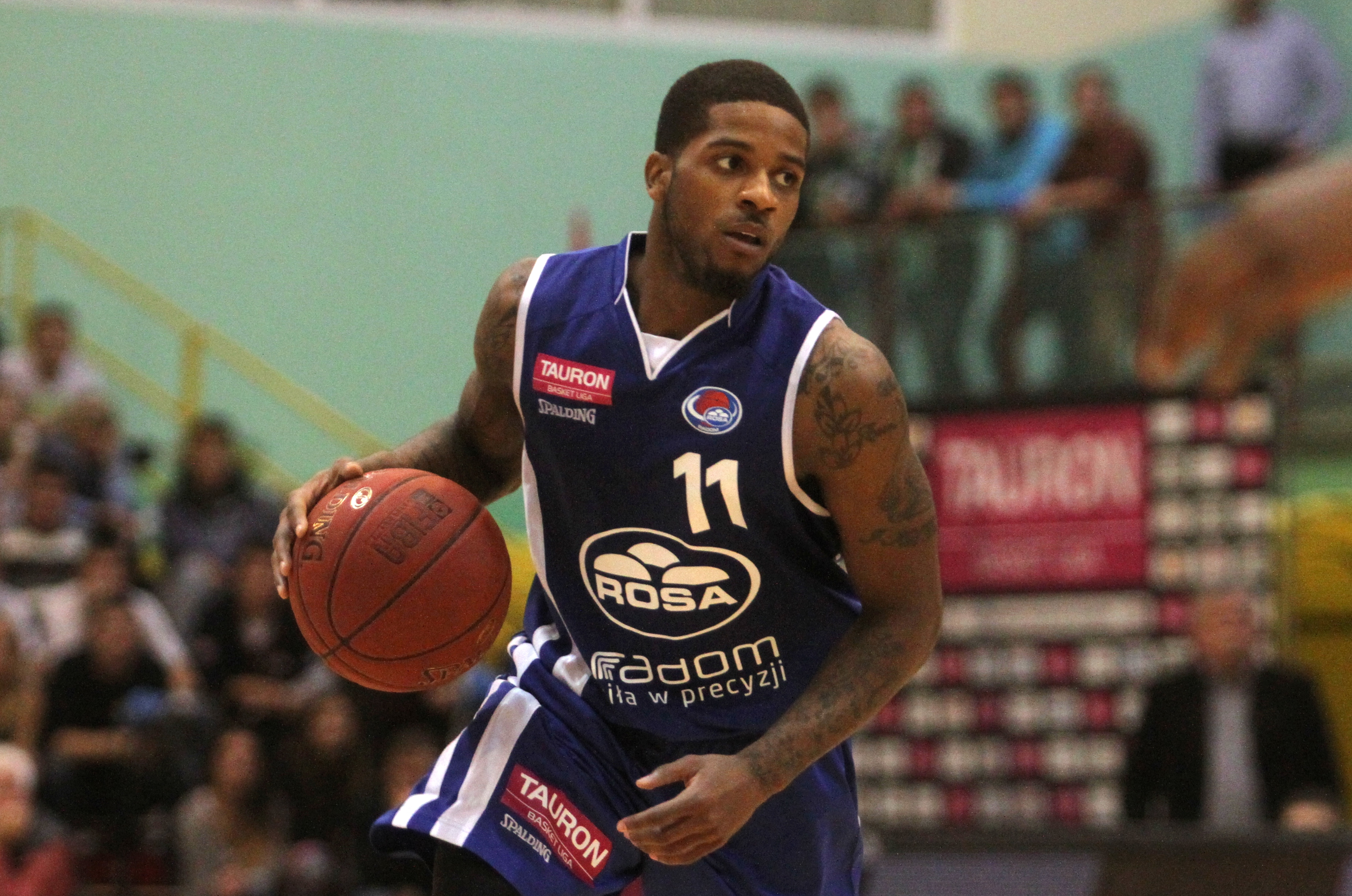

Personal information
- Born: November 5, 1989 (age 37) Gary, Indiana, U.S.
- Listed height: 5 ft 11 in (1.80 m)
- Listed weight: 187 lb (85 kg)

Career information
- High school: Rufus King (Milwaukee, Wisconsin); Pius XI (Milwaukee, Wisconsin)
- College: Michigan State (2008–2011); Iowa State (2012–2013)
- NBA draft: 2013: undrafted
- Playing career: 2017–2019
- Position: Point guard

Career history
- 2013–2014: Rosa Radom
- 2014: Keravnos
- 2015–2016: Wilki Morskie Szczecin
- 2016: Henan Shedianlaojiu
- 2017: Moncton Miracles
- 2017: Rabotnički

Korian "Korie" Lucious (born November 5, 1989) is an American former professional basketball player. He played college basketball for the Iowa State University Cyclones men's basketball team. Upon transferring from the Michigan State University Spartans men's basketball team in 2011, he redshirted the 2011–12 season and began playing for the Cyclones in 2012–13.

== Early life ==
On March 30, 2004, the 15-year-old Lucious was featured and described as a phenom in the sports section of the Milwaukee Journal Sentinel. After playing two years at perennial basketball powerhouse Rufus King High School, Lucious made a highly publicized transfer to the private Pius XI High School.

== College career ==
As a sophomore during the 2009–2010 season for Michigan State, Lucious saw his playing time more than double as he averaged 22.9 minutes per game, up from 9.1 as a freshman. He averaged 5.6 points, 3.3 assists, and 1.7 rebounds per game during his sophomore campaign. He hit a buzzer-beating three against the University of Maryland in the second round of 2010 NCAA Men's Division I Basketball Tournament to give the Spartans an 85–83 win over the Terrapins. The 5th-seeded Spartans eventually made it all the way to the Final Four, falling to Butler.

In January 2011, Lucious was suspended from the Michigan State program for the remainder of the 2010–2011 season for "conduct detrimental to the team." "I didn't live up to the standards of the program," Lucious said in the statement. "Unfortunately, I let my teammates, my coaches, and myself down, and wish them the best for the rest of the season."

Lucious then transferred to Iowa State University where, due to transfer rules, he would have to sit for the 2011–2012 season. In the 2012–2013 season he would go on to start all 35 games he would play at Iowa State. The Cyclones would make the 2013 NCAA Men's Division I Basketball Tournament beating Notre Dame before falling to Ohio State.

=== College statistics ===
Year	Team	GP	GS	MPG	FG%	3P%	FT%	RPG	APG	SPG	BPG	PPG
2008–09	Michigan State	38	1	9.1	.377	.354	.667	.8	1.2	.3	.1	3.2
2009–10	Michigan State	36	6	22.9	.341	.317	.739	1.7	3.3	.8	.1	5.6
2010–11	Michigan State	18	0	24.4	.312	.284	.762	1.7	4.1	.8	.2	6.5
2012–13	Iowa State	35	35	31.1	.377	.366	'.803	1.9	5.6	.8	0	10.1
Career		127	42	21.2	.356	.336	.766	1.5	3.4	.6	.1	6.2

== Professional career ==
In August 2013, Lucious announced he has signed with Polish team Rosa Radom.

On August 26, 2017, he signed with Macedonian basketball club Rabotnički.

== Personal life ==
Lucious is the son of Latonia Guider and Antone Brazil.
