= Mike Rice Jr. =

American college basketball coach (born 1969)

Biographical details
- Born: February 13, 1969 (age 57); Pittsburgh, Pennsylvania, U.S.

Playing career
- 1987–1991: Fordham

Coaching career (HC unless noted)
- 1991–1994: Fordham (assistant)
- 1994–1997: Marquette (assistant)
- 1997–1998: Niagara (assistant)
- 1998–2001: Chicago State (assistant)
- 2004–2006: Saint Joseph's (assistant)
- 2006–2007: Pittsburgh (assistant)
- 2007–2010: Robert Morris
- 2010–2013: Rutgers
- 2015–2017: The Patrick School

Head coaching record
- Overall: 117–82 (college)
- Tournaments: 0–2 (NCAA Division I); 0–1 (NIT)

Accomplishments and honors

Championships
- 3 NEC regular season (2008–2010); 2 NEC tournament (2009, 2010)

Awards
- 2× NEC Coach of the Year (2008, 2009)

Michael Thomas Rice Jr. (born February 13, 1969) is an American college basketball coach, formerly the head men's basketball coach at Robert Morris University and later Rutgers University. He is the son of former college basketball coach and Portland Trail Blazers announcer Mike Rice. In 2009, he helped lead Robert Morris to its first NCAA tournament since 1992. Rice gained national attention in 2013, when ESPN aired Rutgers practice videos showing the coach verbally and physically abusing players. Rice was fired the next day. He resides in Little Silver, New Jersey.

== Overview ==
Rice was born in Pittsburgh, Pennsylvania, to Kathy and Mike Rice. He attended Boardman High School in Boardman, Ohio where he was a three-year starter as a basketball guard. He was a three-year starter for the Fordham University basketball team from 1988 to 1991 and was captain of the team his senior year when Fordham went to the National Invitation Tournament. He received a bachelor's degree in communication. After graduation he was an assistant coach at several programs including Fordham 1991–1994; Marquette University 1994–1997; Niagara University 1997–1998; Chicago State University 1998–2001; St. Joseph's University 2004–2006; and University of Pittsburgh 2006–2007. In addition he was associated with the Hoop Group in Neptune, New Jersey from 2001 to 2004 where he was director of the Eastern Invitational Basketball Camp.

In 2007, he became head coach at Robert Morris University, and in 2010 he became head coach of Rutgers University.

== Rutgers University suspension and firing ==
On December 13, 2012, Rice was suspended three games without pay and fined $50,000 for abusive behavior toward his players. The suspension came after athletic director Tim Pernetti obtained video footage from a practice during either Rice's first or second season at Rutgers, at which Rice was seen throwing basketballs at players' heads and cursing at them. Assistant coach David Cox led the team during Rice's suspension. As part of the suspension, Rice was not only banned from any contact with his players or going on recruiting visits, but was banned from coming onto campus altogether. Pernetti characterized the suspension as "a complete removal from the program," but stated that Rice would return to Rutgers for the 2013–14 season pending a review of his behavior.

The situation changed dramatically on April 2, 2013, when ESPN's Outside the Lines aired several hours of video from Rice's practices. According to ESPN, the video, provided to Pernetti by then-assistant coach Eric Murdock, showed Rice berating, pushing, kicking, cursing, using homophobic slurs, and throwing basketballs at players during practices. Murdock said that he first told Pernetti about the abuse in the summer of 2012, but Pernetti took no action until he and other Rutgers officials saw the video in December. Murdock claims he was fired in July for reporting the abuse, and sued Rutgers for wrongful termination. An independent investigation found that there was insufficient evidence to support Murdock's claims that Rice created a hostile work environment. It also found the video was not in context, since it depicted practices from Rice's first year at Rutgers. However, it did find that Rice's actions brought "shame and disgrace" to Rutgers–on paper, grounds to fire Rice for cause regardless of the merits of Murdock's claims. Pernetti later said that his gut feeling had been to fire Rice on the spot, but ultimately concluded that Rutgers policy would not justify a firing.

The video touched off a nationwide outcry, with New Jersey Governor Chris Christie condemning Rice's behavior, and State Assembly Speaker Sheila Oliver among many demanding that Rice be fired. The next day, Rutgers fired Rice as head coach. According to The (Newark) Star-Ledger, the move came after school president Robert Barchi saw the video for the first time, although he had signed off on Pernetti's decision to suspend Rice in December. When Barchi saw the video, he called in Pernetti and told him that Rice had to leave immediately. Barchi held Pernetti responsible for the debacle, and decided on the night he watched the DVD that Pernetti had to go as well. According to The Record, on the same day Rice's firing was announced, Barchi told Pernetti to resign or be fired. Pernetti resigned two days later.

In a post-mortem of the circumstances leading to Rice's firing, The New York Times reported that Rutgers officials were so focused on whether Rice created a hostile work environment for his assistants that they ignored "the larger question" of whether Rice's behavior toward his players in and of itself demanded his firing.

== Head coaching record ==
=== College ===
Record table
| Season | Team | Overall | Conference | Standing | Postseason |
|---|---|---|---|---|---|
Robert Morris Colonials (Northeast Conference) (2007–2010)
| 2007–08 | Robert Morris | 26–8 | 16–2 | 1st | NIT first round |
| 2008–09 | Robert Morris | 24–11 | 15–3 | 1st | NCAA Division I Round of 64 |
| 2009–10 | Robert Morris | 23–12 | 15–3 | T–1st | NCAA Division I Round of 64 |
| Robert Morris: | | 73–31 (.702) | 46–8 (.852) | | |
Rutgers Scarlet Knights (Big East Conference) (2010–2013)
| 2010–11 | Rutgers | 15–17 | 5–13 | 13th | |
| 2011–12 | Rutgers | 14–18 | 6–12 | T–11th | |
| 2012–13 | Rutgers | 15–16* | 5–13 | 12th | |
| Rutgers: | | 44–51 (.463) | 16–38 (.296) | | |
| Total: | | 117–82 (.588) | | | |
National champion Postseason invitational champion Conference regular season champion Conference regular season and conference tournament champion Division regular season champion Division regular season and conference tournament champion Conference tournament champion

* Rice was suspended by Rutgers for three games in December 2012. Assistant coach David Cox served as interim coach during Rice's suspension, but Rutgers credits the entire 2012–13 season to Rice.
