= Horace Walker (basketball) =

American basketball player (1937–2001)

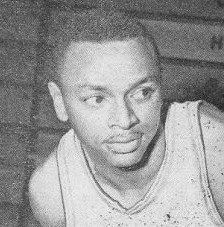

Personal information
- Born: April 17, 1937 Chester, Pennsylvania, U.S.
- Died: June 7, 2001 (aged 64)
- Listed height: 6 ft 3 in (1.91 m)
- Listed weight: 210 lb (95 kg)

Career information
- High school: Chester (Chester, Pennsylvania)
- College: Michigan State (1957–1960)
- NBA draft: 1960: 4th round, 30th overall pick
- Drafted by: St. Louis Hawks
- Position: Small forward
- Number: 15

Career history
- 1961: Denver-Chicago Trucking
- 1961–1962: Chicago Packers
- 1962–1963: Trenton Colonials

Career highlights
- Third-team All-American – AP, UPI (1960)
- Stats at NBA.com
- Stats at Basketball Reference

Horace L. Walker (April 17, 1937 – June 7, 2001) was an American National Basketball Association (NBA) player. As a senior at Michigan State University, he was named to the AP All-America third team. Walker was then drafted with the sixth pick in the fourth round of the 1960 NBA draft by the St. Louis Hawks. On June 24, 1961, he was traded to the Chicago Packers for a fourth-round pick in the 1962 NBA draft. In his one season with the Packers, Walker averaged 6.7 points and 7.2 rebounds per game.

== Career statistics ==
Legend
GP	Games played	GS	Games started	MPG	Minutes per game
FG%	Field goal percentage	3P%	3-point field goal percentage	FT%	Free throw percentage
RPG	Rebounds per game	APG	Assists per game	SPG	Steals per game
BPG	Blocks per game	PPG	Points per game	**Bold**	Career high

=== NBA ===
==== Regular season ====
Year	Team	GP	MPG	FG%	FT%	RPG	APG	PPG
1961–62	Chicago	65	20.5	.339	.725	7.2	1.1	6.7
