= Ken Johnson (basketball, born 1962) =

American basketball player

Personal information
- Born: November 7, 1962 (age 64) Tuskegee, Alabama, U.S.
- Listed height: 6 ft 8 in (2.03 m)
- Listed weight: 240 lb (109 kg)

Career information
- High school: La Jolla (La Jolla, California)
- College: USC (1981–1983); Michigan State (1983–1985)
- NBA draft: 1985: 2nd round, 28th overall pick
- Drafted by: Chicago Bulls
- Position: Power forward
- Number: 00

Career history
- 1985–1986: Portland Trail Blazers
- 1987: Albany Patroons
- 1988: Charleston Gunners
- 1988–1989: Albany Patroons
- 1993: Tri-City Chinook

Career highlights
- Second-team Parade All-American (1981)
- Stats at NBA.com
- Stats at Basketball Reference

Kenneth H. Johnson (born November 7, 1962) is an American former basketball player. He played for the Portland Trail Blazers of the National Basketball Association (NBA).

Johnson played college basketball for the University of Southern California and Michigan State University. After the close of his college career, Johnson was drafted by the Chicago Bulls of the NBA in the second round of the 1985 NBA draft (28th pick overall). He was subsequently traded to the Portland Trail Blazers and appeared in 64 games in the 1985–86 season, averaging 4.1 points and 3.8 rebounds per game. In addition to his stint in the NBA, Johnson played three seasons in the Continental Basketball Association (CBA). He averaged 6.1 points and 8.7 rebounds in 53 games for the Charleston Gunners, Albany Patroons and Tri-City Chinook.

== Career statistics ==
Legend
| GP | Games played | GS | Games started | MPG | Minutes per game |
| FG% | Field goal percentage | 3P% | 3-point field goal percentage | FT% | Free throw percentage |
| RPG | Rebounds per game | APG | Assists per game | SPG | Steals per game |
| BPG | Blocks per game | PPG | Points per game | **Bold** | Career high |

=== NBA ===
==== Regular season ====
| Year | Team | GP | GS | MPG | FG% | 3P% | FT% | RPG | APG | SPG | BPG | PPG |
|---|---|---|---|---|---|---|---|---|---|---|---|---|
| 1985–86 | Portland | 64 | 0 | 12.7 | .528 | – | .435 | 3.8 | .3 | .2 | .3 | 4.1 |

==== Playoffs ====
| Year | Team | GP | GS | MPG | FG% | 3P% | FT% | RPG | APG | SPG | BPG | PPG |
|---|---|---|---|---|---|---|---|---|---|---|---|---|
| 1986 | Portland | 2 | 0 | 5.5 | – | – | – | 1.0 | .0 | 1.0 | .0 | .0 |
