= Idong Ibok =

Nigerian basketball player

Idongesit William Ibok
Personal information
- Born: 17 February 1985 (age 41) Lagos, Nigeria
- Listed height: 6 ft 11 in (2.11 m)
- Listed weight: 260 lb (118 kg)

Career information
- High school: Montverde Academy (Montverde, Florida)
- College: Michigan State (2005–2009)
- NBA draft: 2009: undrafted
- Playing career: 2009–2011
- Position: Center

Career history
- 2009–2010: KD Hopsi Polzela
- 2010: Solna Vikings
- 2010–2011: New Mexico Thunderbirds

Idongesit William Ibok (born 17 February 1985) is a Nigerian former professional basketball player, formerly a center with the Michigan State University Spartans in the United States. Ibok, a graduate of Montverde Academy in Florida, began attending Michigan State in 2005. He is a three-time all-academic Big Ten Conference. He is 6'11" and 260 lbs, with a 7'5" wingspan.
