= Delvon Roe =

American basketball player and actor

Personal information
- Born: October 3, 1989 (age 37)
- Listed height: 6 ft 8 in (2.03 m)
- Listed weight: 235 lb (107 kg)

Career information
- High school: St. Edward (Lakewood, Ohio)
- College: Michigan State (2007–2010)
- Position: Forward

Career highlights
- Fourth-team Parade All-American (2007)

Delvon Roe (born October 3, 1989) is an American actor and former basketball player who played at Michigan State University. He was listed as a 6 ft 8 in (2.03 m) forward. He ended his career in September 2011 after three years at Michigan State due to degenerative knee pain.

== High school basketball career ==
Roe played basketball at St. Edward High School in Lakewood, Ohio. During his senior season, his team was ranked in the USA Today Super 25 (national rankings) and rated as a top-5 team in the Midwest. Roe would miss the rest of his high school career with a knee injury. He was one of the top recruits for the class of 2008, rated as a 5-star, 24th overall best player in the nation by Rivals.

== College basketball career ==
Roe started and contributed often for the 2008-2009 Michigan State basketball team, averaging 18 minutes a game on the national runner-up Spartans. He was the only freshman to start in the National Championship Game. Increasingly effective as his knee healed, Roe was eventually named to the Big-Ten All Freshman Team.

During the Big Ten Conference season, Roe had an offensive rebounding percentage of 14.0%, a defensive rebounding percentage of 22.3% and an effective field goal percentage of 57.6%. Going back to the 1996-1997 season, the only freshman from a BCS conference to do better than Roe in all three of those categories in conference play was Kevin Love of UCLA in the 2007-2008 season. In his sophomore season, Roe averaged 6.4 points per game and 5 rebounds per game. During Roe's junior year, 2010–2011, he averaged 6.1 points, 5.0 rebounds, and 1.2 blocks per game.

On September 29, 2011, Roe announced he was ending his basketball career due to degenerative knee pain, and would miss his senior year.

== Acting career ==
Roe earned his BFA in acting from Michigan State in two years.

Roe played the role of Isaac in the film Love and Honor, which was sold at the Marché du Film at the 2012 Cannes Film Festival. It premiered in the United States in 2013.

Roe was under contract for the film "Race to Judgement", a story covering the real-life 1973 murder of a young black woman in Howell, Michigan, that centers on the involvement of the Ku Klux Klan and Rev. Robert Miles, who was once a grand dragon of the Ku Klux Klan. Delvon is to play the role of Tre, the older brother of the murder victim.

In 2019, he began a recurring role on the new BET TV series Games People Play.
