= Travis Walton (basketball) =

American basketball player

Agua Caliente Clippers
- Title: Assistant coach
- League: NBA G League

Personal information
- Born: August 24, 1987 (age 39) Lima, Ohio
- Listed height: 6 ft 2 in (1.88 m)
- Listed weight: 189.2 lb (86 kg)

Career information
- High school: Lima Senior (Lima, Ohio)
- College: Michigan State (2005–2009)
- NBA draft: 2009: undrafted
- Playing career: 2009–2012
- Position: Guard
- Coaching career: 2014–present

Career history

Playing
- 2009: Lugano Tigers
- 2010–2011: Ratiopharm Ulm
- 2011: Dakota Wizards
- 2012: Fort Wayne Mad Ants
- 2012: Canton Charge

Coaching
- 2014–2017: Idaho Stampede / Salt Lake City Stars (assistant)
- 2017–present: Agua Caliente Clippers (assistant)

Career highlights
- Big Ten Defensive Player of the Year (2009)

Travis Walton (born August 24, 1987) is an American former professional basketball player, and assistant coach with the Agua Caliente Clippers. Previously, he was an assistant coach with the Salt Lake City Stars of the NBA G League. He played college basketball at Michigan State University. In 2009, he was selected as the Big Ten Defensive Player of the Year. Travis was born in Lima, Ohio, to Lakita and Nathaniel Walton. Walton played four consecutive years in Lima for Lima Senior. He was also recruited by Marquette.

Walton played for the Detroit Pistons in the 2009 NBA Summer League. He then played in Europe in Switzerland and Germany. Walton played in the NBA D-League for the Dakota Wizards in 2011. In 2012, he played for the Fort Wayne Mad Ants and the Canton Charge.

According to a report from ESPN's "Outside the Lines," in 2010 Walton allegedly struck a female bar patron twice on the face, with the force of the blow knocking her off her barstool. Walton was charged with assault and battery, but the case was dismissed on April 10, 2010.
